= Midlothian and Peebles Northern by-election =

Midlothian and Peebles Northern by-election may refer to:

- 1929 Midlothian and Peebles Northern by-election
- 1943 Midlothian and Peebles Northern by-election

== See also ==
- Midlothian and Peebles Northern (UK Parliament constituency)
