= Aileen McCorkell =

Aileen Allen McCorkell, Lady McCorkell OBE (née Booth; 18 September 1921 – 25 December 2010) was the founder and first President of the British Red Cross branch in Derry. In 1972, she and her husband, Colonel Sir Michael McCorkell, hosted secret peace talks between the British Government and the Provisional IRA, whose delegation included Gerry Adams.

== Early life ==
McCorkell was born on 18 September 1921 in the Indian hill station of Ootacamund, the younger daughter of Lt-Col Ernest Brabazon Booth DSO, RAMC, and his wife Marguerita Agnes, daughter of John Currie, of London. Her obituary noted that "Aileen had no memories of India, but a lifelong fear of snakes was reliably attributed to an incident in her infancy when a cobra came up through the bath’s plughole, only to be quickly dispatched by a capable ayah with a meat cleaver."

When she was two years old, the family returned to Ireland to live at Darver Castle, Dundalk, County Louth. She was taught by a Governess before being educated at Dundalk Grammar School and Westonbirt. She was at a finishing school in Paris in 1939 at the outbreak of war.

== War Experiences ==
"In an Anglo-Irish society in which those "who did not go" to the war were long remembered, it never occurred to her that she should not do her bit, but ironically her early attempts to join the Wrens in Belfast were rebuffed precisely because she came from southern Ireland. She was eventually accepted for the Women's Auxiliary Air Force (the WAAF) in 1941", hiding her privileged upbringing in a castle from the other girls in the ranks.

She signed the Official Secrets Act and was trained, on the then highly Hush-Hush Radar, as a Filter Plotter at Leighton Buzzard and was eventually stationed near Nottingham, and later in Belfast. "She was commissioned after four years in the ranks – an experience which left her with a lifelong distrust of women in authority – and posted to North of England Coastal Command". She stayed in service until the end of 1946. After a brief spell as a school matron at Cheltenham she returned to Ireland.

== The Troubles ==
"Brought up in the Irish Republic before World War II, she had never imbibed the political and religious intolerance of the North, realising instead that, by its principles of humanity, neutrality and impartiality, the Red Cross could play a vital role in Northern Ireland. Accordingly she steered the Derry branch down a middle way of absolute neutrality between two warring communities."

Having broken her back hunting, she turned to voluntary work in 1961. She founded the Derry City Red Cross group in 1962, which became a fully-fledged branch in 1965, with her as its first President. She also became a member of the Northern Ireland Council of the British Red Cross.

Her obituary noted that her early work focussed on establishing welfare services across the city of a kind now taken for granted but then notably absent; in areas of considerable poverty and dilapidation such as Catholic Bogside. In particular, the physically handicapped who were confined to homes wholly ill-suited to their needs and Lady McCorkell began a "Thursday Club" to bring together the disabled from across the city. These early beginnings were to result, after victory in battles financial and political, in the building of the Glenbrook Day Centre. It was established on land accessible to all parts of the city, but originally denied them because it had been designated for Protestant housing. Additionally, the Red Cross established services, such as Meals on Wheels, this put Lady McCorkell into contact with other voluntary organisations working in Derry, notably the Order of Malta, "a connection which was to be vital when serious trouble began to engulf the city from October 1968 onwards".

It was to the Order of Malta First Aid Post, in Westland Street near the Bogside Inn, that she and her deputy made their way amid the ferocious fighting which followed the Apprentice Boys' parade of 12 August 1969. Here she learnt quickly to lose her identity and to help treat, without judgement, the seriously injured casualties who were unwilling to go to hospital.

"She did not share the temporary euphoria that greeted the arrival of the British Army to protect the Catholic communities, and her foreboding was soon vindicated. As the Bogside and Creggan areas became 'no go' areas to the security forces she developed a lifelong admiration and respect for the strength of character and unfailing good humour of the Derry people in the face of continual adversity."

She would not take sides and "she was as prepared to take an army commander to task for exhibiting a red cross on an armoured vehicle which was clearly being used to block the advance of rioters, as she was to telephone the Bogside Committee to ask them to send someone down to stop looting of relief clothing and food from the Red Cross aid store." In response, a "cheerful ruffian with a club was sent to stand guard".

By the end of 1970, bombings took violence in Derry in a sinister new direction, and Lady McCorkell "found herself dealing with everything from finding accommodation for those made homeless by bombs to finding a wig for a girl shaved, tarred and feathered for going to the pub with soldiers. She was in the Bogside on Bloody Sunday and never forgot ferrying a distraught young priest back through the dark, fearful streets to the Creggan. She would never be drawn on that terrible day, not being prepared to see beyond the stark tragedy of so many young people losing their lives."

Following an explosion of violence, in June 1972, in which hundreds had been killed, Colonel Sir Michael and Lady McCorkell agreed to host, at the family home near the Londonderry/Donegal border, clandestine peace talks between the British government and the Provisional IRA, whose delegation included a young Gerry Adams. It was their clear-sighted impartiality and pragmatism, which led to the McCorkells agreeing to host the secret peace talks. Beyond "greeting the parties, and providing a chocolate cake, the McCorkells left the negotiators alone to get on with it".

In September 2019, BBCNI's Spotlight On The Troubles (Episode 2), covered these historic talks and visited Ballyarnett to film, which had by now been sold by the McCorkell family. The episode also included an interview with their son David, who disclosed extracts from Lady McCorkell's private journal about the event for the very first time.

"The truce which followed was short-lived and within a month members of the North Derry Pony Club, who were having their annual camp on the McCorkell farm, woke to find soldiers had arrived secretly in the night and were shaving out of their horses' feed buckets". This was the build-up to Operation Motorman and the "re-occupation" of the no-go areas. Thus, she embarked on further tortuous negotiations, this time with soldiers, about the free movement of Meals on Wheels and the return of the temporarily impounded Order of Malta ambulance. "Long years of violence and bitterness were to follow, during which the Derry City Red Cross, led by its indefatigable president, gave unstinting and impartial service. Lady McCorkell was fond of saying that the Red Cross is neutral 'even in Northern Ireland'".

Her experiences during the Troubles were recorded in a short memoir, A Red Cross in My Pocket, published in 1992, and parts of it were made into an anthology in 1995 in I Owe My Life: A Celebration of 125 Years of the British Red Cross.

== Honours ==
For her work during the Troubles she was awarded, in 1972, the Red Cross Badge of Honour for Distinguished Service. In 1975, she was appointed OBE.

She always recalled having her hair done for Buckingham Palace next to a girl who was having hers done "to visit her man in the H Blocks in Long Kesh".

Lady McCorkell represented Northern Ireland on the London Council of the British Red Cross and when she was subsequently awarded the coveted Queen's Badge of Honour of the Red Cross in 1986, Sylvia, Countess of Limerick, reminded the audience of Lady McCorkell's invariable habit of urging the council to stop worrying whether there should be two or three buttons on the sleeve of their uniform, and get on with doing something useful. There are only 30 holders of the Badge at any one time, the last Northern Ireland recipient, before her, being the Duchess of Abercorn.

== Family ==
After the war, when back in Ireland, she met, and, in 1950, married, Michael McCorkell, from a Londonderry family which had run a sailing fleet in the 18th and 19th century; the McCorkell Line. In 1975, he became Lord Lieutenant of County Londonderry, serving in this capacity for 25 years. In 1994, he was appointed KCVO. Another notable member of the McCorkell family was Sir Dudley McCorkell. Aileen's elder sister, Joan Booth, married Ronald Colville, 2nd Baron Clydesmuir.

== Death ==
Lady McCorkell's husband predeceased her in 2006 and she was survived by three sons, a daughter, grandchildren and great grandchildren. She died on 25 December 2010 at the age of 89.

Her son, David, was appointed Lord Lieutenant of County Antrim in June 2019.
