= David McCorkell =

British businessman and Lord Lieutenant

David William McCorkell KStJ DL
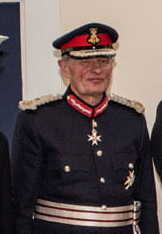
- McCorkell in 2022

Lord Lieutenant of Antrim
- Incumbent
- Assumed office 29 June 2019
- Preceded by: Joan Christie

Personal details
- Born: 26 February 1955 (age 71) Derry, Northern Ireland
- Spouse(s): Susan, née Goodbody
- Children: 1 daughter, 1 son
- Education: Charterhouse
- Occupation: Company Director
- Profession: Investment Management
- Awards: KStJ
- Website: https://www.antrimlieutenancy.org.uk/

Military service
- Allegiance: British
- Branch/service: Army
- Years of service: 1970s, 2020-
- Rank: Hon Colonel
- Unit: North Irish Horse (TA), 1st (NI) Bn ACF

David William McCorkell KStJ DL (born 26 February 1955) is a British businessman and Lord Lieutenant of County Antrim, the third successive generation of the McCorkell family to be appointed as one of Her Majesty’s Lord Lieutenants.

== Early life ==
McCorkell is the second son of Colonel Sir Michael McCorkell KCVO OBE CStJ TD JP and Lady McCorkell OBE, daughter of Lieut Colonel E. B. Booth, DSO, of Darver Castle, Dundalk, County Louth. McCorkell was born in Derry before being educated in England at Charterhouse.

== Career ==
Having previously farmed and worked for the family business, Wm McCorkell & Co Ltd, who operated the McCorkell Line from 1778. McCorkell changed career and moved into investment management, joining Bell Lawrie White, which was bought by Brewin Dolphin in 1993. He joined the plc board of Brewin Dolphin in 2006 and in 2007 became head of investment management, retiring in 2012. He is a Fellow of the Chartered Institute for Securities & Investment.

He served on the Committee of Down Royal Racecourse from 2014–19 and is now a Committee Member of the Down Royal Corporation of Horse Breeders. He was elected to the Turf Club (Ireland), the regulatory body for horse racing in Ireland in 2016. On 1 January 2020, David was appointed as a Board Member of the Irish Horseracing Regulatory Board (IHRB) and as a Steward of the Irish National Hunt Steeplechase Committee (INHS).

He is a Trustee and Member of the SSAFA Council in London and the Regional Representative for Northern Ireland and the Republic of Ireland.

He was appointed Deputy Lieutenant for the County of Antrim in 2014, and appointed Lord Lieutenant of County Antrim in June 2019. He is the third successive generation of the McCorkell family to be appointed as one of Her Majesty’s Lord Lieutenants. His late father, Colonel Sir Michael, and his great uncle, Sir Dudley McCorkell, both served as Lord Lieutenant of County Londonderry, the neighbouring Lieutenancy. His father served as Lord Lieutenant for 25 years, and was knighted with the KCVO for his service, in 1994. David was appointed chair of the Northern Irish Lord-Lieutenants in 2022, representing Northern Ireland on the Association of Lord-Lieutenant's Committee in London.

Whilst working in Northern Ireland, McCorkell also served in the Territorial Army in North Irish Horse in the 1970s. His father had commanded the regiment in the 1960s and became Honorary Colonel of the North Irish Horse in 1975. He was appointed Honorary Colonel of 1st (NI) Battalion ACF in August 2020

He was appointed as a Knight of the Order of St John and Knight Commander of the Commandery of Ards in 2021. The Commandery of Ards overseas the work of the Order of St John in Northern Ireland.

== Family ==
McCorkell married Susan Mary, daughter of Desmond Goodbody, a prominent family of Clara County Offaly. Desmond was Managing Director and later Chairman of J & L F Goodbody Ltd. They have two children; Camilla McCorkell born in 1986 and Christopher McCorkell born in 1988. Christopher is married to Gemma McCorkell, an ENT surgeon.

His mother Lady McCorkell OBE founded the Derry Red Cross during The Troubles. Ronald Colville, 2nd Baron Clydesmuir KT CB MBE TD was his uncle and also served as a Lord Lieutenant (of Lanarkshire). The McCorkells, who are originally from Scotland, are from the Clan McCorquodale and share similar armorial bearings. They are also a sept of Clan Gunn. McCorkell is a descendant of The Earls and Countesses of Longford and King Edward III. His ancestor William McCorkell set up the McCorkell Line in 1778, the family shipping business.

Honorary titles
Preceded by Mrs Joan Christie CVO OBE	Lord Lieutenant of County Antrim; 2019–	Succeeded by
