= High Sheriff of County Londonderry =

Judicial representative in County Londonderry

The High Sheriff of County Londonderry is the high sheriff (the British monarch's personal representative) for an area corresponding to the former administrative county of Londonderry in Northern Ireland. The office was created along with the county in 1613 as the Sheriff of the City and County of Londonderry, and renamed in 1900 when the separate High Sheriff of Londonderry City came into being for the city (commonly called Derry).

== History ==
During the Plantation of Ulster, the London livery companies were made responsible for the area that became County Londonderry based on the earlier County Coleraine. A single 1613 charter established Londonderry city and county and the Irish Society as the livery companies' body for overseeing the plantation. The charter did not make the city a separate county corporate from the county-at-large, but did refer to the county as "the City and County of Londonderry" and gave the common council of the city corporation the privilege of electing two sheriffs annually for the county. Although the charter required the sheriffs to reside in the city or its liberties, occasionally the corporation included one of the rural gentry among the sheriffs in a vain attempt to lessen their resentment against this privilege. The Municipal Corporations (Ireland) Act 1840 abolished this corporate privilege; henceforth the county had a single sheriff appointed, as in other Irish counties, by the Lord Lieutenant of Ireland. The Local Government (Ireland) Act 1898 separated "the City and County of Londonderry" into the county borough of Londonderry (comprising the city) and the administrative county of Londonderry (the remainder), with separate sheriffs for each.

== Sheriffs of the City and County of Londonderry ==
- 1613: William Glynne and Robert Griffith
- 1613: Edward Doddington
- 1623: Thomas Keyes and Hugh Thompson
- 1624: Tobias Smyth and George Handcock
- 1642–1647: Robert Lawson
- 1662: Gervais Squire and Richard Graham
- 1670: William Noble and William Kyle
- 1671: Edward Edwards and William Miller
- 1672: William Rogers and Francis Newton
- 1673: Samuel Hobson and Andrew Coningham
- 1674: Henry Thompson and John Buchanan
- 1675: Robert Houston and Henry Long
- 1676: James Coningham and John Ash
- 1677: William Squire and Alexander Lecky
- 1678: Charles Newton and James Morrison
- 1679: Andrew Coningham and Matthew Bridges
- 1680: Robert Shannon and John Ewing
- 1681: Henry Farbasco and James Gordon
- 1682: James Strong and Henry Cochran
- 1683: William Hemsworth and James Sympson
- 1684–1685: Andrew Coningham and Matthew Cocken
- 1686: John Campsie and William Newton
- 1687: William Newton and Henry Ash
- 1688–1689: Edward Brookes and Horace Kennedy
- 1690: Thomas Moncrieff and Henry Ash
- 1691: Henry Ash and Samuel Leeson
- 1692–1693: William Crookshank (died May 1693, replaced by John Crookshank) and John Harvey
- 1694: William Mackie and Thomas Ash
- 1695: John Cowan and Hugh Davey
- 1696: John (or Robert) Harvey and Alexander Coningham
- 1697: Joseph Morrison and John Dixon
- 1698: Albert Hall and Robert Gamble
- 1699–1700: John Denning and Samuel Harvey

=== 18th century ===
- 1701: John Denning and George Tomkins
- 1702: Archibald Coningham and Joseph Ewing
- 1703: Thomas Lecky and James Anderson
- 1704: Alexander Skipton and Joseph Davey
- 1705: William Edgar and John Ridell
- 1706: George Ash and John Moore
- 1707–1708: Robert Norman and Frederick Coningham
- 1709: Henry McManus and John Duckett (died 1705 and replaced by Matthew Squire)
- 1710: Robert Houston and Peter Stanley
- 1711–1712: Giles Gifford and Francis Jennings
- 1713: Frederick Coningham and Edward Skipton
- 1714: Alexander Squire and Thomas Moncrieff
- 1715: Robert Taylor and Frederick Gordon
- 1716: George Gonne and Robert Graham
- 1717: John Darcus and Francis Jennings
- 1718: Phillip Sullivan and Henry Hart
- 1719: Henry McManus and Edward Carter
- 1720: Frederick Coningham and Henry White
- 1721: John Darcus and Andrew McIlwaine
- 1722: George Ash and Frederick Gordon
- 1723: William Stewart and William Ash
- 1724: Richard Coningham and Matthew Leeson
- 1725: Edward Skipton and George Crookshank
- 1726: Henry Dixon and William Montgomery
- 1727: Andrew McIlwaine and William Ash
- 1728: George Hart and John Davis
- 1729: Robert Houston (died July 1729 and replaced by James Every) and Ullysses Burgh
- 1730: Edward Houston and Ezekiel Coningham
- 1731: Charles McManus and Jeremiah Gardner
- 1732: Richard Coningham and George Ewart
- 1733: John Darcus and Joseph Hill
- 1734: Andrew McIlwaine and William Foliott
- 1735: William Gamble and George Ash
- 1736: Francis Knox and Alexander Lecky
- 1737–1739: Francis Knox and Henry Darcus
- 1740: Andrew McIlwaine and Mossom Gamble
- 1741: Charles Richardson and William Foliott
- 1742: Charles Richardson and John Hamilton
- 1743: John Hamilton and George Gordon
- 1744: George Gordon and William Boyd
- 1745–1746: William Hamilton and John Fairly
- 1747: John Fairly and Thomas Lecky
- 1748–1749: Thomas Lecky and William Kennedy
- 1750: William Hamilton and Robert Fairly
- 1751–1753: William Hamilton and Hugh Hill
- 1754–1755: Samuel Montgomery and J. Mauleverer
- 1756: William Hamilton and Robert Houston
- 1757–1758: Frederick Hamilton and James Ramage
- 1759–1761: James Ramage and Thomas James
- 1762: Thomas James and William Reynolds
- 1763: William Reynolds and Adam Schoales
- 1764–1772: Stephen Bennett and John Nicolls
- 1773–1774: John Nicolls and James Ramage
- 1775: John Darcus and Matthew Rutherford
- 1776: John Coningham and Hol. Lecky
- 1777: Squire Lecky and James Patterson
- 1778: Daniel Patterson and Samuel Curry
- 1779: David Ross and William Swettenham
- 1780: Eneas Murray and Mossom Boyd
- 1781: George Lenox and William McLintock
- 1782: Michael Ross and William Lenox
- 1783: John Hart and Joseph Curry
- 1784: Dick Coningham and George C Kennedy
- 1785: William Walker and Roger Murray
- 1786: Andrew Ferguson, jnr and R. Harrison
- 1787: Alexander Lecky and Alexander Fletcher
- 1788: David Ross and H. Mitchell
- 1789: Adam Schoales, jnr and George Hart
- 1790: George Schoales and James Galbraith
- 1791: William Alexander and George Curry
- 1792: William Lenox and George Hart
- 1793: Marcus Hill and Alexander Young
- 1794: R. Murray and James Murray
- 1795: R. G. Hill and William Law
- 1796: J. Murray and William Patterson
- 1797: J. Murray and John Bond
- 1798: Thomas Lecky and William H. Ash
- 1799: Thomas Patterson and John Ferguson

=== 19th century ===
- 1800: Maurice Knox and A. Major
- 1801: Thomas P. Kennedy and T. Moffett
- 1802: David Ross and Thomas Murray
- 1803: Thomas Patterson and William D. Lecky
- 1804: David Ross and James Gregg
- 1805: James Moody and J. Moffett
- 1806: Thomas Young and P. McDonagh
- 1807: J. Chambers and William Marshall
- 1808: Henry Barré Beresford and Thomas Woore
- 1809: Thomas Shepherd and C. Rea
- 1810: J. Dysart and William Ball
- 1811: J. Coningham and D. Ross
- 1812: Thomas Kennedy and James Gregg
- 1813: James Gregg and John Rea
- 1814: Conolly Skipton and M. M'Causland
- 1815: Samuel Curry and Tristram Carcy
- 1816: J.Murray and Thomas P. Kennedy
- 1817: James Major and Richard Harvey
- 1818: John Thompson and Richard Babington
- 1819: Thomas Kennedy and E. Leslie
- 1820: D. Knox and W. M'Clintock
- 1821: Joshua Gillespie and Marcus Gage
- 1822: Thomas P. Kennedy and James S. Gage
- 1823: Dominick Knox and Andrew Bond
- 1824: Thomas P. Kennedy and Sir William Williams
- 1825: Marcus M'Causland and Thomas D. Bateson
- 1826: Adam Schoales and George Hill
- 1827: Sir James Robertson Bruce, 2nd Baronet and Pitt Skipton
- 1828: William Lenox-Conyngham and Tristram kennedy
- 1829: John Hart and George H. Boggs
- 1830: Conolly Gage and William Gregg
- 1831: John Murray and Joshua Gillespie
- 1832: Adam Schoales and Samuel J. Crookshank
- 1833: Henry Darcus and Anthony Babington of Creevagh
- 1834: John Murray and Frederick Hamilton
- 1835: Stewart Crawford Bruce and Anthony Babington of Creevagh
- 1836: Henry Darcus and Archibald McCorkell of Glengalliagh
- 1842: Henry Richardson
- 1846: Henry Hervey Bruce
- 1846: John Barré Beresford, of Learmount
- 1848: John Stephenson of Fort William, Tobermore
- 1849: James Johnston Clark, of Lugantogher Maghera
- 1850: Robert Peel Dawson
- 1854: Robert Leslie Ogilby of Ardnargle
- 1856: Robert Houston
- 1857: William Edward Scott of Willsboro
- 1858: Samuel Maxwell Alexander of Newtownlimavady
- 1870: Robert Jackson Alexander of Portglenone
- 1859: William Fitzwilliam Lenox-Conyngham of Springhill House
- 1860: James Thomas Macky of Castlefin
- 1861: Rowley Miller of Moneymore
- 1862: John Adams of Ballydevitt
- 1863: George Skipton
- 1866: Conolly Thomas McCausland of Drenagh
- 1867: James R. Montgomery
- 1868: Henry Kyle of Laurel Hill
- 1869: Sir John Hill, 4th Baronet, of St. Colombs
- 1873: Alexander Shuldham of Flowerfield
- 1875: James Jackson Clark of Largantogher
- 1877: Robert Lyon Moore
- 1878: Bartholomew McCorkell of Richmond
- 1880: George Cather of Carrickhugh, Limavady
- 1882: Adolphus John Spencer Churchill Chichester
- 1883:
- 1886: Andrew Alexander Watt of Thorn Hill
- 1887: Robert Alexander Ogilby of Pellipar, Dungiven
- 1888: Conolly William Lecky Browne-Lecky of Derry
- 1889:
- 1894: Bartholomew H. McCorkell of Richmond
- 1895: John Cooke
- 1898: John Arthur Wellesley O'Niell Torrens of Somerset, Co Londonderry

== High Sheriff of County Londonderry ==
=== 20th century ===
- 1901: Arthur David Ash Gaussen of Ballyronan
- 1902: Major Henry John McCorkell of Glengallaugh
- 1903: Hervey Juckes Lloyd Bruce
- 1905: John McFarland later Sir John McFarland, 1st Baronet
- 1906: Cecil Hamilton Browne-Lecky of Comber House
- 1907: Robert Peel Dawson Spencer Chichester of Moyola Park
- 1908: Maurice Marcus McCausland of Drenagh
- 1909: William Arbuthnot Lenox-Conyngham of Springhill House
- 1910: Mervyn Challoner Tynte of Tynte Park
- 1911: Robert James Leslie Ogilby of Ardnargle, Limavady and Pellipar House, Dungiven
- 1912: William Randal Hamilton Beresford-Ash
- 1912: Henry Joseph Cooke
- 1913:
- 1916: Robert Lee Hogg
- 1917:
- 1922: Alexander Wallis Clark
- 1923: John Russell Scott of Willsboro
- 1924: Ralph Henry Barre de la Poer Beresford of Learmount Castle, Park
- 1925: Sir Dudley Evelyn Bruce McCorkell of Ballyarnett, Londonderry.
- 1926: Lieutenant George Francis Gilliland of Brook Hall, Londonderry
- 1927: William Maxwell Scott Moore of Molenan
- 1928: Henry Jackson Clark of Ardtara, Upperlands
- 1929: Commander James Lenox Chichester-Clark of Moyola Park, Castledawson
- 1930: Hiram Parkes Wilkinson of Moneyshanere and Drumballyhagan, Tobermore
- 1931: Major George Dominic Heyland of Ballintemple, Garvagh
- 1932: Samuel Hanna, Barrister-at-Law of Drumachose, Limavady
- 1933: John Alexander Clark of Gravesend, Castledawson
- 1934: Sir Charles Norman Lockhart Stronge, 8th Baronet
- 1935: William Lowry Lenox-Conyngham of Springhill House, Moneymore
- 1936: Alexander William Maxwell Clark
- 1937: Conolly Robert McCausland of Cumber House, Claudy
- 1938: William Moore Wallis Clark
- 1939: Hugh Ranken Morrison of Wigmore, Aghadowey
- 1940: Sir Henry Hewey Francis Macdonald-Tyler of The Umbra, Magilligan
- 1941: Captain Hugh Lecky of Beardeville, Cloyfin, County Antrim.
- 1942: John Michael Cromie Montague of Cromore, Portstewart
- 1943: Daniel Hall Christie
- 1944: John Cherry Drennan of Carse Hall, Limavady
- 1945: Arthur Harold Noble of Rossett, Denbighshire, Wales and Victoria Road, Londonderry
- 1946: Captain Cyril Anthony de Lacy Nicholson, K.C. of Beech Hill, Co. Londonderry
- 1947: Major-General Robert Knox Hezlet of, Bovagh, Agliadowey, Co. Londonderry.
- 1948: Robert Maxwell Lyon Moore of Molenan, Londonderry
- 1949: Thomas Fitzpatrick Cooke
- 1950: Major Douglas Beresford-Ash of Ashbrook
- 1951: Thomas Jackson Clark
- 1952: Colonel Sir Basil Alexander Talbot McFarland, 2nd Baronet of Aberfoyle, (also High Sheriff of Londonderry City)
- 1953: Major Daniel Jackson Christie of Bannfield, Coleraine
- 1954: Lieut.-Colonel Kenneth Bulstrode Lloyd Davidson of The Manor House, Eglinton.
- 1955: Major James Fitzgerald Desmond of Ballyarton House, Killaloo
- 1956: Colonel John Andrew Crawford of Ardmore House, Drumahoe
- 1957: Major Henry Francis Clark of Rockwood, Upperlands, Londonderry
- 1958: John Talbot McFarland, Drumleery, Shantallow, Culmore Road, Londonderry
- 1959: Lieut.-Colonel Richard Gowland Gaskell Harvey of Milltown House, Londonderry
- 1960: Major John Loewenthan Kinnaird of The Old Rectory, Culmore
- 1961: Colonel Sir Michael McCorkell of Ballyarnett
- 1962: Air Marshal Sir George Robert Beamish of Rocklea, Castlerock
- 1963: John Bullick, Esq., Farmhill, Coleraine
- 1964: Brigadier Leonard Ferguson Heard of The Ferns, Magilligan
- 1965: Charles Brian Clark of Clonmore, Upperlands
- 1966: Captain John Averell Lecky of Castleroe, Coleraine
- 1967: Marcus Edgecumbe McCausland of Shell Hill, Strieve, Limavady
- 1968: Vice-Admiral Sir Arthur Richard Hezlet of Bovagh House, Aghadowey.
- 1969: Henry Wallace Stuart Clark of Gorteade Cottage, Upperlands.
- 1970: Major Patrick Evelyn McCorkell of Drumlerry, Shantallow,
- 1971: W. Bristow Stevenson of Knockan, Feeny.
- 1972: J. Michael A. Nicholson of Beech Hill, Ardmore
- 1973: William John Moore Clarke of Gorteade House, Upperlands,
- 1974: Dennis F. Desmond of Claudy,
- 1975: Dr. Robert Wilbur Temple of Holme Lea, Castlerock Road, Coleraine,
- 1976: John Randal Beresford-Ash of Ashbrook,
- 1977: Daniel Monro Christie of Ballybogey House, Ballybogey, Ballymoney,
- 1978: Edward Arthur Harry Boyle of Ardnargle, Limavady.
- 1979: William Aubrey Craig of Bridge House, Kilrea, Colerame.
- 1980: Dr. Ian Robert Oscar Gordon of Old Rectory, Banagher, Denychrier, Dungiven
- 1981: Robert Gordon Clark of Upperlands
- 1982: James T. Eaton of Londonderry
- 1983: A.B. Johnston of Culmore Point
- 1984: G.A. McIlwrath of Coleraine
- 1985: R.M. Harvey of Drumahoe
- 1986: John Barry Ernest McCorkell of Dromore
- 1991: R.S. McCullough of Coleraine
- 1992: W.R.L. Moore of Londonderry
- 1993: K.H. Cheevers of Coleraine
- 1994: William Stephen Patrick Clark
- 1995: John W. Moore of Portstewart
- 1996: Terence C. Boyd of Portrush
- 1997: Thomas McMullan Mcllwaine of Cloughmills
- 1998: Peter Miles Welsh of Limavady
- 1999: Doris Hutchieson of Ballymoney, Co. Antrim

=== 21st century ===
- 2000: William Francis Graham Hunter of Bond's Glen Road, Killaloo
- 2001: Florence M. M. Sloan, of Feeny Road, Feeny
- 2002: Professor James Scott Brown of Mountsandel Road, Coleraine
- 2003: Patrick Joseph Heron, Edenreagh Road, Eglinton
- 2004: Lorna Anne Moore Dane, Mountsandel Road, Coleraine
- 2005: Rosemary O'Donnell of Eglinton
- 2006: William Hugh McKeown
- 2007: Sharyn Gail Griffith, Mountsandel Road, Coleraine,
- 2008: Patrick Thaddeus McGinnis, Clooney Road, Gortgare, Greysteel
- 2009: David George Henderson of Magherafelt Road, Tobermore
- 2010: Trevor Kenneth Alastair Magee
- 2011: John Burns
- 2012: Jean Davidson of Eglington
- 2013: Philip Gilliland
- 2014: John O'Niell of Coleraine
- 2015: Helen Mark of Limavady
- 2016: Damian John Heron of Magherafelt
- 2017: Jean Thompson Caulfield of Coleraine
- 2018: Anna Mary Clyde of Garvagh
- 2019: Samuel David Graham Mawhinney of Magherafelt
- 2020: Ross Wilson
- 2023: Peter Arnold Wilson, of Coleraine

== Sources ==
- Moody, James; Pigott, David R. "Report on the City of Londonderry". Appendix to the first report of the Commissioners appointed to inquire into the Municipal Corporations in Ireland; Part III. Parliamentary papers. Vol. HC 1836 xxiv (29) 1.
