= Charles de Bois Murray =

Scottish judge, politician and writer

Captain Charles de Bois Murray (1891 – 19 March 1974), was a Scottish judge, politician and writer. He served as Sheriff in Renfrewshire and Berwickshire, and as a Liberal Party candidate.

== Background ==
Murray was born the eldest son of C.R. Murray. He was educated at The Glasgow Academy and Glasgow University. In 1929 he married Hope Cruickshank Smith. They had one son and one daughter.

== Political career ==
Murray was Liberal candidate for the Tradeston division of Glasgow at the 1922 General Election. He was then Liberal candidate for the Midlothian and Peebles Northern division at the 1923 General Election. He did not stand for parliament again.

=== Electoral record ===
General Election 1922: Glasgow Tradeston
Party	Candidate	Votes	%	±%
Labour Co-op	Thomas Henderson	14,190	55.7	n/a
Unionist	Vivian Leonard Henderson	9,977	39.2	−24.2
Liberal	Charles de Bois Murray	1,310	5.1	−12.3
Majority		4,213	16.5	n/a
Turnout		25,477	75.4	+21.5
Labour Co-op gain from Unionist		Swing	n/a	

General Election 1923: Midlothian and Peebles Northern
Party	Candidate	Votes	%	±%
Labour	Andrew Bathgate Clarke	8,570	45.3	+7.0
Unionist	George Aitken Clark Hutchison	6,731	35.7	−5.2
Liberal	Charles de Bois Murray	3,578	19.0	−1.8
Majority		1,839	9.6	n/a
Turnout		18,879	74.7	+2.0
Labour gain from Unionist		Swing	+6.1	

== Publications ==
- Forbes of Culloden, 1936
- How Scotland is Governed, 1938 (second ed. revised, 1947)
- Rebuilding Europe, 1944
- The Law of Wills in Scotland, 1945
- The Future of Scots Law, 1961
