= 1933 East Fife by-election =

UK Parliamentary by-election

Henderson-Stewart

The 1933 East Fife by-election was held on Thursday, 2 February 1933. The by-election was held due to the death of the sitting Liberal National MP, Sir James Duncan Millar. It was won by the Liberal National candidate James Henderson-Stewart.

== Candidates ==
27 year-old David Edwin Keir stood as an Independent Liberal candidate. Keir had stood for the Liberals at the 1929 Midlothian and Peebles Northern by-election and also contested the same seat at the 1929 general election. He was the Liberal candidate for Roxburgh and Selkirk at the 1931 general election, and was the son of the Rev. T. Keir of Dumfries, and was educated at Dumfries Academy and the University of Edinburgh. He was a journalist.

== Result ==
East Fife by-election, 1933
Party	Candidate	Votes	%	±%
Liberal National	James Henderson-Stewart	15,770	52.2	N/A
Labour	Joseph Westwood	6,635	22.0	New
Agricultural Party	J. L. Anderson	4,404	14.6	New
Independent Liberal	David Edwin Keir	2,296	7.6	New
National (Scotland)	Eric Linklater	1,083	3.6	New
Majority		9,135	30.2	N/A
Turnout		30,188	65.6	N/A
Liberal National hold		Swing		

Anderson, running under the Agricultural Party, attracted many of his votes from Unionists who regretted not being able to field a candidate of their own due to the political pact with the Liberal Nationals.
