= Michael McCorkell =

British Army officer (1925–2006)

Colonel Sir Michael William McCorkell KCVO, OBE, CStJ, TD, JP

Lord Lieutenant of County Londonderry
- In office 13 June 1975 – 3 May 2000
- Preceded by: John Cherry Drennan CBE, JP
- Succeeded by: Sir Denis Desmond KCVO, CBE

Personal details
- Born: 3 May 1925 Buncrana, County Donegal, Ireland
- Died: 13 November 2006 Derry
- Spouse(s): Aileen A., Lady McCorkell, OBE née Booth
- Children: 1 daughter, 3 sons
- Occupation: Landowner and Soldier
- Profession: Army officer
- Awards: KCVO OBE CStJ TD

Military service
- Allegiance: British
- Branch/service: Army
- Years of service: 1944 to 1980s
- Rank: Colonel
- Unit: 16th/5th The Queen's Royal Lancers and North Irish Horse (TA)

Colonel Sir Michael William McCorkell KCVO OBE CStJ TD JP DL (3 May 1925 – 13 November 2006) was an Irish born soldier and British public servant, serving as Lord Lieutenant of County Londonderry for 25 years.

== Early life ==
McCorkell was the son of Capt. B. F. McCorkell DL, of Templeard, Culmore, County Londonderry. His uncle, Sir Dudley McCorkell, had also been Lord Lieutenant of County Londonderry. He was born in Buncrana, Inishowen, County Donegal in 1925 and was educated at Rockport School in Holywood, County Down, and at Aldenham School. The outbreak of World War II and the subsequent curtailment of travel caused him to finish his education at Campbell College.

== Military career ==
During the war, he joined the Royal Artillery as a gunner before being commissioned into the Royal Armoured Corps (RAC) Officer Cadet Training Unit (OCTU) at Sandhurst. The Royal Military College had closed on the outbreak of war. He served with the 16th/5th Lancers, choosing that regiment because of its Irish heritage; the 5th had been the Royal Irish Lancers until 1922. In December 1944, he joined the regiment in the Apennine Mountains where it was serving in an infantry role. As he was only 19 his father had had to sign a certificate to allow him to be posted overseas.

Commanding a tank troop, he fought in the final phase of the Italian campaign with the 6th Armoured Division which broke through the Argenta Gap and broke the German line in the plain of the Po. His unit was among the first into Austria where the British Army had to deal with a complex array of problems that would have taxed Solomon. As Austria became more settled, life for a soldier eased. These were heady times for a young soldier. Michael shot chamois on Hermann Göring's mountain estate in Austria (the heads of the chamois were fine ones because the Luftwaffe had dropped hay to the beasts on the hill) and he kept the Mess in trout with regular forays to the Alpine streams and lakes; and cavalrymen were in their element here, with the pick of the liberated Austrian and German horse flesh at the allies' disposal. McCorkell was involved in two enormous tattoos at the Schönbrunn Palace in Vienna and at the Olympiastadion (Olympic Stadium) in Berlin, where he and others performed cavalry trick rides.

He was a Major in the Territorial Army and North Irish Horse (1951). His long involvement with the North Irish Horse, which he joined on the formation of the TA in Northern Ireland in 1947, had already seen him commanding it in the 1960s and, without hesitation, he became T & AVR Colonel, Northern Ireland, in 1971–1974, Aide-de-camp to Queen Elizabeth II (1972), Aide-de-camp to Governor of Northern Ireland (1956–1968), Brevet Colonel (1974), Honorary Colonel of the North Irish Horse in 1975 and President of the T & AVR, Northern Ireland in 1977.

== Honours ==
As a devout Christian, and a wholly ecumenical one, McCorkell served all sides of the community, during some of the county's toughest times, without prejudice or favour, offering support or sympathy, but never doctrine: he was genuinely and wholly non-political as Lord-Lieutenant of County Londonderry from 1975 to 2000. He was made High Sheriff of County Londonderry from 1961 and, like many of his ancestors before him, Deputy Lieutenant for the County of Londonderry from 1962; Justice of the Peace from 1980. He was awarded the TD in 1954 and bar in 1963; OBE (military) in 1964, Commander of the Order of St John of Jerusalem (CStJ; 1991), and knighted with the KCVO in 1994.

Like his uncle, Sir Dudley McCorkell, he served on the Londonderry Port and Harbour Commissioners and as Chairman of Wm McCorkell, who operated the McCorkell Line from 1778. Again, following in his uncle’s footsteps, McCorkell served as a Member of the Ulster Transport Authority from 1962-1966.

== Secret IRA Meeting at the family home ==
In extreme secrecy, what is now believed to have been the first meeting between the Provisional Irish Republican Army (IRA) and senior officials of the British Government took place at Ballyarnett, Colonel Sir Michael's family home, on 20 June 1972. The IRA was represented at that meeting by Dáithí Ó Conaill and Gerry Adams, and the British government was represented by Frank Steele, believed to be an MI6 agent, and Philip Woodfield.

The meeting lasted four hours and the British side informed the IRA representatives that while William Whitelaw refused to offer political status, he was prepared to suspend arrests of republicans and searches of homes. Both sides then agreed to call a ten-day ceasefire.

In September 2019, BBCNI's 'Spotlight On The Troubles', Episode 2, covered these historic talks and visited Ballyarnett to film, which had by now been sold by the McCorkell family. The episode also included an interview with their son David McCorkell, who disclosed extracts from Lady McCorkell's private journal about the event for the very first time. Further extracts from the journal were later released by the media

== Family ==
In 1950 he married Aileen Allen, OBE, daughter of Lieut Colonel E. B. Booth, DSO, of Darver Castle, Dundalk, County Louth, by whom he had three sons (John Barry Ernest, David, and Barry Michael) and one daughter (Mary Aileen).

Lady McCorkell founded the Derry Red Cross during The Troubles. Sir Ronald Colville, 2nd Baron Clydesmuir was his brother-in-law. Sir Michael's cousin Moyra, married James Chichester-Clark (later Lord Moyola, former Prime Minister of Northern Ireland).

The McCorkells, who are originally from Scotland, are from the Clan McCorquodale and are a sept of Clan Gunn. He was also a descendant of The Earls of Longford and King Edward III. His ancestor, William McCorkell, set up the McCorkell Line in 1778; the family shipping business.

Upon his death at age 81, a Thanksgiving Service was held in St Columb's Cathedral, Derry for Sir Michael.

Honorary titles
Preceded by Major John Loewenthan Kinnaird	High Sheriff of County Londonderry; 1961	Succeeded by Air Marshal Sir George Robert Beamish
Preceded by John Cherry Drennan	Lord Lieutenant of County Londonderry; 1975–2000	Succeeded by Denis Desmond
