= CR Davis =

CR Davis may refer to:

- Chester R. Davis (1896–1966), American businessman
- Carl Raymond Davis (1911–1940), British/American fighter pilot
