= Sir John Hope, 16th Baronet =

British soldier and politician

Sir John Hope OBE
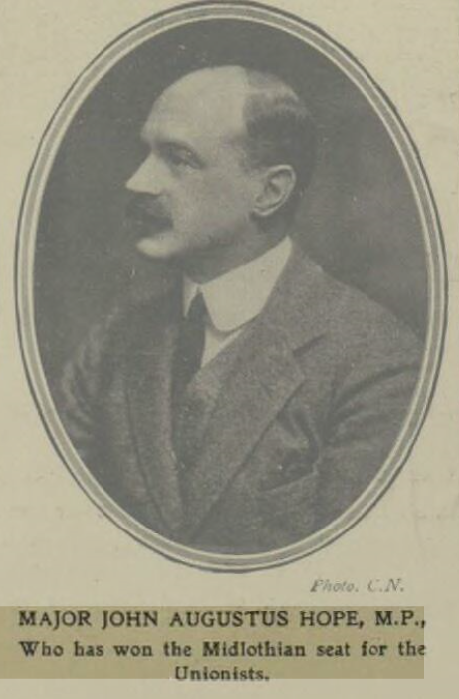
- Major John Augustus Hope, 16th Baronet Hope of Craighall, London Illustrated News, 14 September 1912

Member of Parliament for Midlothian and Peebles Northern Midlothian (1912–18)
- In office 10 September 1912 – 15 November 1922
- Preceded by: Alexander Murray
- Succeeded by: George Hutchison

Personal details
- Born: John Augustus Hope; 7 July 1869
- Died: 17 April 1924 (aged 54)
- Party: Unionist
- Parent: Charles Hope (father)

Lieutenant-Colonel Sir John Augustus Hope, 16th Baronet, OBE (7 July 1869 – 17 April 1924) was a British soldier and politician.

== Early life and career ==
Hope was son of Rev. Charles Augustus Hope, Rector of Barwick in Elmet, Yorkshire,

== Army career ==
He entered the British Army when he was commissioned a second lieutenant in the King's Royal Rifle Corps (KRRC) on 22 May 1889, and was promoted to the rank of lieutenant on 1 July 1891 and to captain on 22 August 1897. Major in 1905. He served in the Second Boer War in South Africa in 1901-1902 and was awarded the Queen's medal with 4 clasps. He was back as a regular officer in the 3rd battalion of his regiment in early September 1902, and was promoted to major in 1905. He later served in World War I with the 9th Battalion King's Royal Rifle Corps, was wounded and awarded the OBE in 1919.

== Political career ==
Hope was an unsuccessful Unionist candidate for Midlothian at the December 1910 General Election, but was elected for the seat at a by-election in 1912.

In 1918 when the constituency was split, he was elected as Conservative member for Midlothian North and Peebles, which he held until 1922.

== Personal life and death ==
In 1910 Hope married the Hon. Mary Bruce, OBE, eldest daughter of Alexander Bruce, 6th Lord Balfour of Burleigh. The couple had the following children:

- Sir Archibald Philip Hope (1912–1987), 17th Baronet Hope of Craighall, commanded No. 601 Squadron RAF during the Battle of Britain
- Lt.-Col. John Cecil Hope, DSO MC, (1913-1945), 1st Battalion, King's Royal Rifle Corps died on 24 April 1945 on active duty in Italy
- Lt.-Col. Hugh Alexander Hope, OBE MC, (1914-1982), fought in WWII with the King's Royal Rifle Corps
- Katharine Anne Hope (1916-1987), married Carl Raymond Davis

He succeeded his uncle, Sir Alexander Hope, 15th Baronet (1824–1918), on 7 March 1918 as the 16th Baronet Hope of Craighall.

Hope probated his will, in Musselburgh, on 6 March 1924. He died on 17 April 1924, aged 54.

Parliament of the United Kingdom
Preceded by Alexander Murray	Member of Parliament for Midlothian; 1912 – 1918	Constituency abolished
New constituency	Member of Parliament for Midlothian North and Peebles; 1918 – 1922	Succeeded by George Hutchison
Baronetage of Nova Scotia
Preceded by Alexander Hope	Baronet (of Craighall); 1918–1924	Succeeded by Archibald Philip Hope
