= Maurice McCausland =

Maurice Marcus McCausland (1872–14 January 1938) was a landowner and political figure in Ireland.

McCausland was born in Drenagh, County Londonderry, the grandson of St Andrew St John, 15th Baron St John of Bletso. He studied at Eton College and Trinity Hall, Cambridge, before becoming a magistrate. He was High Sheriff of County Londonderry in 1908, and in 1926, he was appointed as Lord Lieutenant of County Londonderry, serving until his death. In 1934, he was appointed to the Privy Council of Northern Ireland.
