= Peebles and Selkirk =

Parliamentary constituency in the United Kingdom, 1868–1918

- Former county constituency for the House of Commons

1868–1918
- Seats: One
- Created from: Peeblesshire; Selkirkshire
- Replaced by: Peebles and Southern Midlothian; Roxburgh and Selkirk

Peebles and Selkirk was a county constituency of the House of Commons of the Parliament of the United Kingdom (Westminster) from 1868 to 1918. It elected one Member of Parliament (MP) by the first past the post voting system.

== Boundaries ==
The name relates the constituency to the counties of Peebles and Selkirk.

From 1708 to 1868, the counties had been covered, at least nominally, by the Peeblesshire and Selkirkshire constituencies.

When the Peebles and Selkirk constituency was abolished in 1918, the Peebles and Southern Midlothian and Roxburgh and Selkirk constituencies were created.

== Members of Parliament ==
Election	Member	Party	Notes
1868	Sir Graham Graham-Montgomery, Bt	Conservative	Previously MP for Peeblesshire
1880	Charles Tennant	Liberal	
1886	Sir Walter Thorburn	Liberal Unionist	
1906	Alexander Murray, Master of Elibank	Liberal	
Jan. 1910	William Younger	Liberal	
Dec. 1910	Sir Donald Maclean	Liberal	Subsequently, MP for Peebles and Southern Midlothian
1918	constituency abolished		

== Elections ==
=== Elections in the 1860s ===
General election 1868: Peebles and Selkirk
Party	Candidate	Votes	%	±%
Conservative	Graham Graham-Montgomery	361	50.2	
Liberal	John Murray	358	49.8	
Majority		3	0.4	
Turnout		719	80.9	
Registered electors		889		
Conservative win (new seat)				

=== Elections in the 1870s ===
General election 1874: Peebles and Selkirk
Party	Candidate	Votes	%	±%
Conservative	Graham Graham-Montgomery	Unopposed		
Registered electors		1,026		
Conservative hold				

=== Elections in the 1880s ===
General election 1880: Peebles and Selkirk
Party	Candidate	Votes	%	±%
Liberal	Charles Tennant	516	51.6	New
Conservative	Graham Graham-Montgomery	484	48.4	N/A
Majority		32	3.2	N/A
Turnout		1,000	88.0	N/A
Registered electors		1,136		
Liberal gain from Conservative		Swing	N/A	

General election 1885: Peebles and Selkirk
Party	Candidate	Votes	%	±%
Liberal	Charles Tennant	1,746	62.7	+11.1
Conservative	Graham Graham-Montgomery	1,038	37.3	−11.1
Majority		708	25.4	+22.2
Turnout		2,784	85.7	−2.3
Registered electors		3,250		
Liberal hold		Swing	+11.1	

General election 1886: Peebles and Selkirk
Party	Candidate	Votes	%	±%
Liberal Unionist	Walter Thorburn	1,375	50.9	+13.6
Liberal	Charles Tennant	1,325	49.1	−13.6
Majority		50	1.8	N/A
Turnout		2,700	83.1	−2.6
Registered electors		3,250		
Liberal Unionist gain from Liberal		Swing	+13.6	

=== Elections in the 1890s ===
Carmichael

General election 1892: Peebles and Selkirk
Party	Candidate	Votes	%	±%
Liberal Unionist	Walter Thorburn	1,603	54.0	+3.1
Liberal	Thomas Gibson-Carmichael	1,367	46.0	−3.1
Majority		236	8.0	+6.2
Turnout		2,970	87.4	+4.3
Registered electors		3,400		
Liberal Unionist hold		Swing	+3.1	

General election 1895: Peebles and Selkirk
Party	Candidate	Votes	%	±%
Liberal Unionist	Walter Thorburn	1,563	50.9	−3.1
Liberal	Alexander Murray	1,509	49.1	+3.1
Majority		54	1.8	−6.2
Turnout		3,072	87.7	+0.3
Registered electors		3,504		
Liberal Unionist hold		Swing	-3.1	

=== Elections in the 1900s ===
Edward Tennant

General election 1900: Peebles and Selkirk
Party	Candidate	Votes	%	±%
Liberal Unionist	Walter Thorburn	1,598	53.5	+2.6
Liberal	Edward Tennant	1,387	46.5	−2.6
Majority		211	7.0	+5.2
Turnout		2,985	82.8	−4.9
Registered electors		3,603		
Liberal Unionist hold		Swing	+2.6	

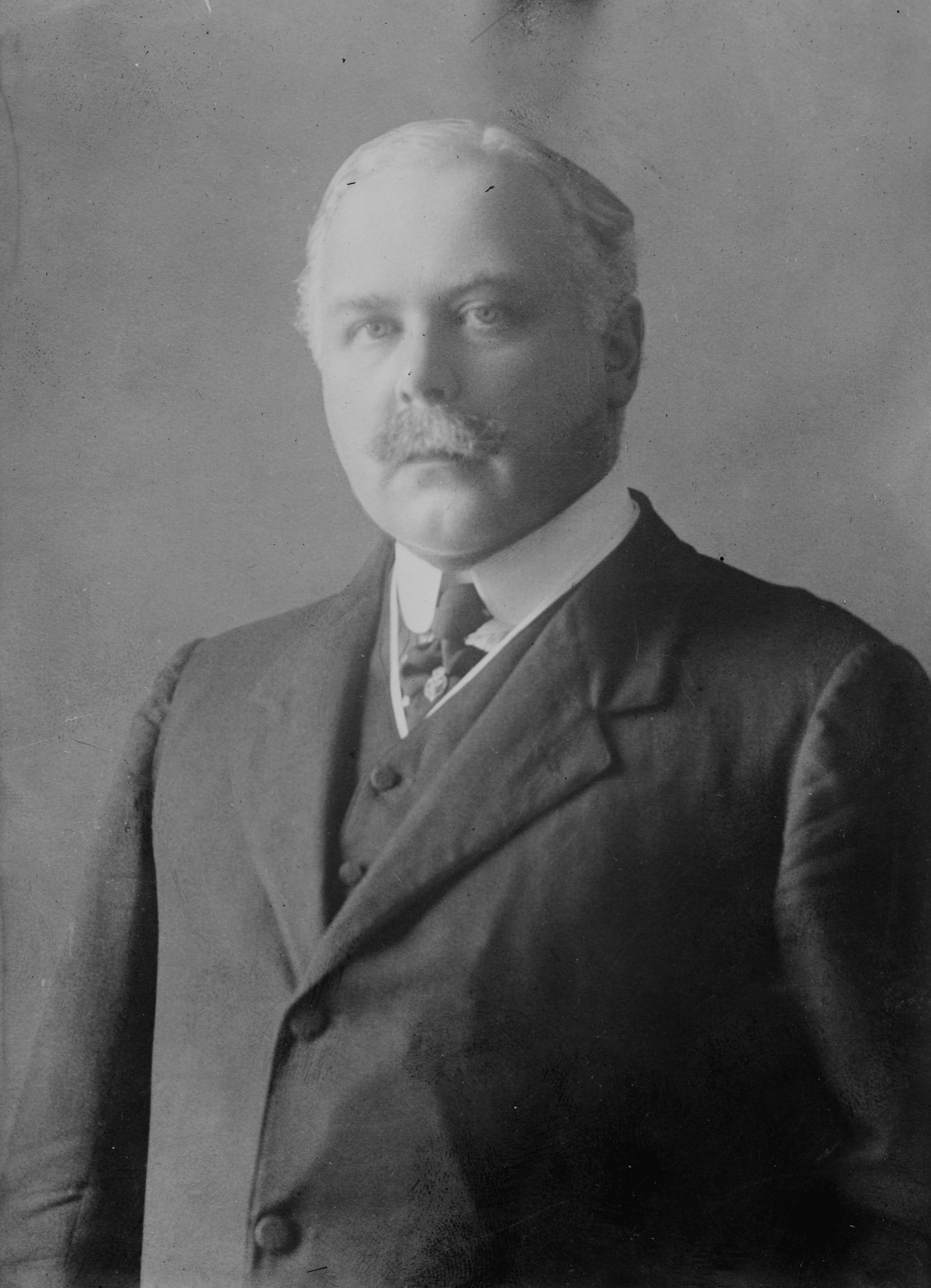
Alexander Murray

General election 1906: Peebles and Selkirk
Party	Candidate	Votes	%	±%
Liberal	Alexander Murray	1,955	55.8	+9.3
Liberal Unionist	Walter Thorburn	1,549	44.2	−9.3
Majority		406	11.6	N/A
Turnout		3,504	91.5	+8.7
Registered electors		3,830		
Liberal gain from Liberal Unionist		Swing	+9.3	

=== Elections in the 1910s ===
William Younger

General election January 1910: Peebles and Selkirk
Party	Candidate	Votes	%	±%
Liberal	William Younger	1,941	52.8	−3.0
Liberal Unionist	Samuel Strang Steel	1,735	47.2	+3.0
Majority		206	5.6	−6.0
Turnout		3,676	91.2	−0.3
Liberal hold		Swing	-3.0	

Donald Maclean

General election December 1910: Peebles and Selkirk
Party	Candidate	Votes	%	±%
Liberal	Donald Maclean	1,965	52.7	−0.1
Liberal Unionist	Samuel Strang Steel	1,764	47.3	+0.1
Majority		201	5.4	−0.2
Turnout		3,729	90.8	−0.4
Liberal hold		Swing	-0.1	

General Election 1914–15:

Another General Election was required to take place before the end of 1915. The political parties had been making preparations for an election to take place and by July 1914, the following candidates had been selected;

- Liberal: Donald Maclean
- Unionist: John Buchan
