= James Lean =

James Lean (1888 – 1975) was a Scottish politician.

Born in Dalkeith, Lean left school to work as a draper, then became a house painter. He joined the Independent Labour Party in about 1908. During World War I, Lean served in the Royal Flying Corps.

Returning to Dalkeith after the war, Lean continued his involvement in socialist politics, and in 1925 was a founder member of the Dalkeith Labour Party. In 1928, he was the first Labour Party member elected to the town council. He served on the council for thirty years, including spells as provost from 1935 to 1938, and 1941 to 1957. He refused the £100 annual payment usually made to provosts.

Lean stood in the 1935 UK general election in Midlothian and Peebles Northern, taking second place with 37.1% of the vote, and at the 1945 UK general election increased this to 45.7%, but was still not elected.
