= Sir Archibald Hope, 17th Baronet =

Scottish aristocrat and aviator

Sir Archibald Philip Hope, 17th Baronet
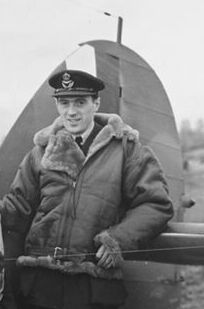
- Hope at RAF Exeter, November 1940
- Born: 27 March 1912
- Died: 12 July 1987 (aged 75); Cirencester, United Kingdom
- Burial place: Inveresk Parish Kirkyard
- Relatives: Sir John Augustus Hope, 16th Baronet (father); Carl Raymond Davis (brother-in-law)
- Military career
- Allegiance: United Kingdom
- Branch: Royal Air Force Volunteer Reserve
- Service years: 1931–1945
- Rank: Group Captain
- Nickname: Archie
- Service number: 90127
- Unit: No. 601 Squadron RAF
- Conflicts: Second World War: Battle of Britain
- Awards: Officer of the Order of the British Empire; Distinguished Flying Cross; Air Efficiency Award; Mentioned in Despatches (2)

Group Captain Sir Archibald Philip Hope, 17th Baronet, OBE, DFC, AE (27 March 1912 – 12 July 1987) was a Scottish aristocrat and aviator who flew with the Royal Air Force during the Second World War.

== Early life and education ==
Archibald Philip Hope, known familiarly as Archie, was the son of Sir John Augustus Hope, 16th Baronet Hope of Craighall and his wife, Hon. Mary Bruce, eldest daughter of Alexander Bruce, 6th Lord Balfour of Burleigh. The Hope Baronetcy of Craighall in the County of Fife, was created in the Baronetage of Nova Scotia on 19 February 1628 for Thomas Hope, a Scottish lawyer and advisor to Charles I. Archibald succeeded to the baronetcy at the age of 12 upon the death of his father in 1924.

Hope attended Eton College and Balliol College, Oxford. He graduated from Balliol in 1934 with a Bachelor of Arts, where he read Modern History. He qualified as a Chartered Accountant. While at Balliol, Hope appeared annually in dramatic productions with the Balliol Players. Hope learned to fly at Balliol College with the Oxford University Air Squadron.

== RAF career ==
Hope served with the Royal Air Force Volunteer Reserve until moving to the No. 601 Squadron, Auxiliary Air Force at Hendon in 1934. He was called to full-time service in the Royal Air Force (RAF) on 24 August 1939, From 19 August 1940 to 10 October 1940, he led the No. 601 Squadron. He left No. 601 Squadron in December 1940, moving on to command RAF Drem during 1943 and RAF Peterhead in 1945.

Hope is credited with five aerial victories during his military tenure. In recognition of his war service, he was decorated with the award of the Distinguished Flying Cross (DFC) in 1940, invested as an Officer of the Order of the British Empire (OBE) in 1945, and admitted to the Royal Company of Archers.

== Later life ==
After the war Hope had business ties to English Electric Company Ltd., Napier Aero Engines Ltd., and Airwork Ltd.

== Family ==
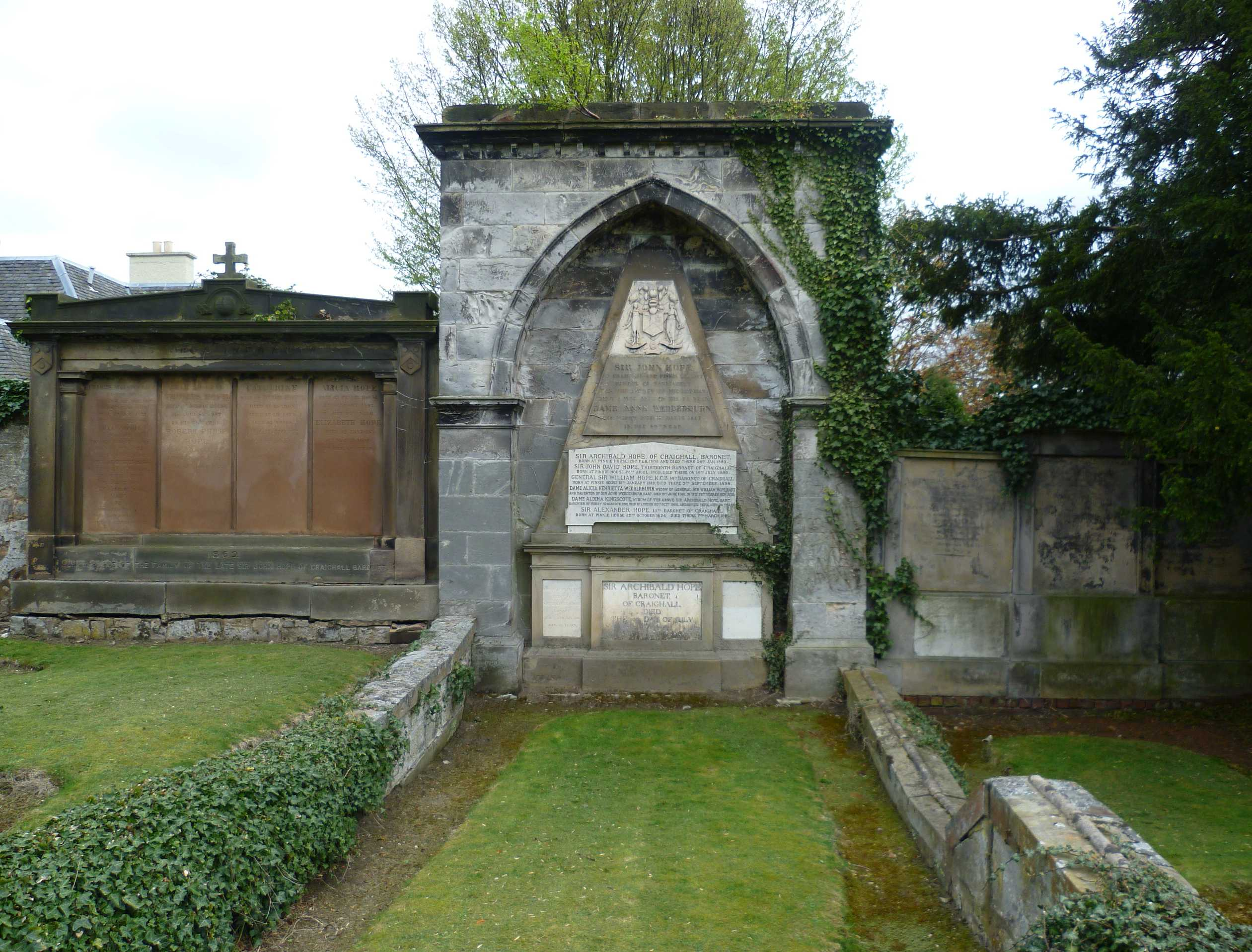
General Sir Archibald Hope's Grave, Inveresk Parish Kirkyard

In 1938, Hope married Ruth Chamberlain Davis, the daughter of Carl R. Davis of Fryern, Storrington, Sussex. The couple had two sons: Sir John Carl Alexander Hope, 18th Baronet (1939–2007) and Charles Archibald Hope (born 1945).

Hope's mother, Lady Hope, was appointed an OBE in 1920, and served as a Justice of the Peace for Midlothian. Lady Hope made her home at Pinkie House.

Hope's sister, Katharine Anne Hope (1916–1987) was married to Hope's No. 601 Squadron mate, Carl Raymond Davis.

A brother, Lieutenant Colonel John Cecil Hope (1913–1945), served with the 1st Battalion, King's Royal Rifle Corps and was awarded the Distinguished Service Order and Military Cross, before he died on 24 April 1945 on active duty in Italy. A second brother, Lieutenant Colonel Hugh Alexander Hope (1914–1982), also fought in the Second World War with the King's Royal Rifle Corps, being appointed an OBE and awarded the Military Cross, but survived the war.

Hope died on 27 July 1987 in Cirencester, Gloucestershire. He and his wife are buried in the Hope Baronets' plot at St. Michael's Parish Church, Inveresk, Scotland.

Baronetage of Nova Scotia
| Preceded by John Augustus Hope | Baronet (of Craighall); 1924–1987 | Succeeded by John Carl Alexander Hope |
