= David King Murray, Lord Birnam =

Scottish advocate and judge

The Honourable Lord Birnam FRSE

Senator of the College of Justice in Scotland
- In office 3 July 1945 – 1955
- Monarchs: George VI; Elizabeth II

Member of Parliament for Midlothian & Peebles Northern
- In office 11 February 1943 – 15 June 1945
- Preceded by: John Colville
- Succeeded by: Lord John Hope

Solicitor General for Scotland
- In office 10 June 1941 – 3 July 1945
- Preceded by: James Reid
- Succeeded by: Daniel Blades

Chairman of the Scottish Land Court
- In office 10 May 1938 – 10 June 1941
- Preceded by: Lord MacGregor Mitchell
- Succeeded by: Lord Gibson

Personal details
- Born: Thomas David King Murray; 29 March 1884 Bothwell, Lanarkshire
- Died: 5 June 1955 (aged 71)
- Spouse: Edith Lilian Archer
- Relations: James Murray (father)
- Education: University of Glasgow
- Profession: Advocate

Thomas David King Murray, Lord Birnam, FRSE (29 March 1884 – 5 June 1955), known as Lord Murray between 1938 and 1941 and Sir David King Murray between 1941 and 1945, was a Scottish advocate and judge who served for two years as Unionist Member of Parliament (MP).

== Early life ==
King Murray was born on 29 March 1884, the son of James Murray of Greenknowe, Bothwell, Lanarkshire who was a merchant in Glasgow. He was educated at Hamilton Academy and the Glasgow High School.

He graduated from the University of Glasgow with an MA in 1904, a BSc in 1905 and an LLB in 1908.

== Career ==
King Murray was trained as a solicitor in Glasgow with the company of Russell & Duncan, WS. He was admitted as an advocate on 18 March 1910, the same day as the future Lord President Wilfrid Normand.

In World War I, King Murray served as a Lieutenant in the RNVR. After the war, he resumed his legal practice and was Junior Counsel to the Treasury in Scotland from 1927 to 1928. He was then Sheriff-Substitute of Lanarkshire at Airdrie from 1928 until he became a King's Counsel in August 1933. He then resigned as sheriff to return to practice in the Court of Session.

Having taken silk, King Murray was a Senior Advocate Depute (prosecutor) from 1936 to 1938. He was regarded as one of the leading King's Counsels of his day.

In May 1938, he appointed as Chairman of the Scottish Land Court, succeeding the late Lord MacGregor Mitchell. On his appointment, The Scotsman newspaper noted that the new judge had "taken a prominent part in political work for the Unionist Party". He took the judicial title Lord Murray, and chaired the court until June 1941, when he joined the wartime coalition government as Solicitor General for Scotland. He dropped the judicial title Lord Murray, and was knighted in the King's Birthday Honours. Murray was succeeded at the Land Court by Robert Gibson, another former pupil of the Hamilton Academy.

He was knighted by King George VI in 1941. In the same year he was elected a Fellow of the Royal Society of Edinburgh. His proposers were Thomas Graham Robertson, Lord Robertson, James Pickering Kendall, Thomas James Jehu and George Freeland Barbour Simpson.

He was Chairman of the Scottish Coalfields Committee from 1942 to 1944.

He was Solicitor General for Scotland from 1941 to 1945, and was elected at a closely fought by-election in 1943 as the Unionist Member of Parliament (MP) for Midlothian and Peebles North. He was knighted in 1941. Murray retired from the House of Commons at the 1945 general election and was appointed a Senator of the College of Justice in Scotland and Lord of Session in 1945, with the judicial title Lord Birnam.

== Family ==
In 1946 he married Edith Lillian Archer.

His nephew was Ronald King Murray, Lord Murray.

== Sources ==
- Who Was Who

Parliament of the United Kingdom
Preceded by John Colville	Member of Parliament for Midlothian and Peebles North; 1943–1945	Succeeded by Lord John Hope
Legal offices
Preceded by James Reid	Solicitor General for Scotland; 1941–1945	Succeeded by Daniel Blades
