= Alexander Murray, 1st Baron Murray of Elibank =

British politician

The Right Honourable The Lord Murray of Elibank PC
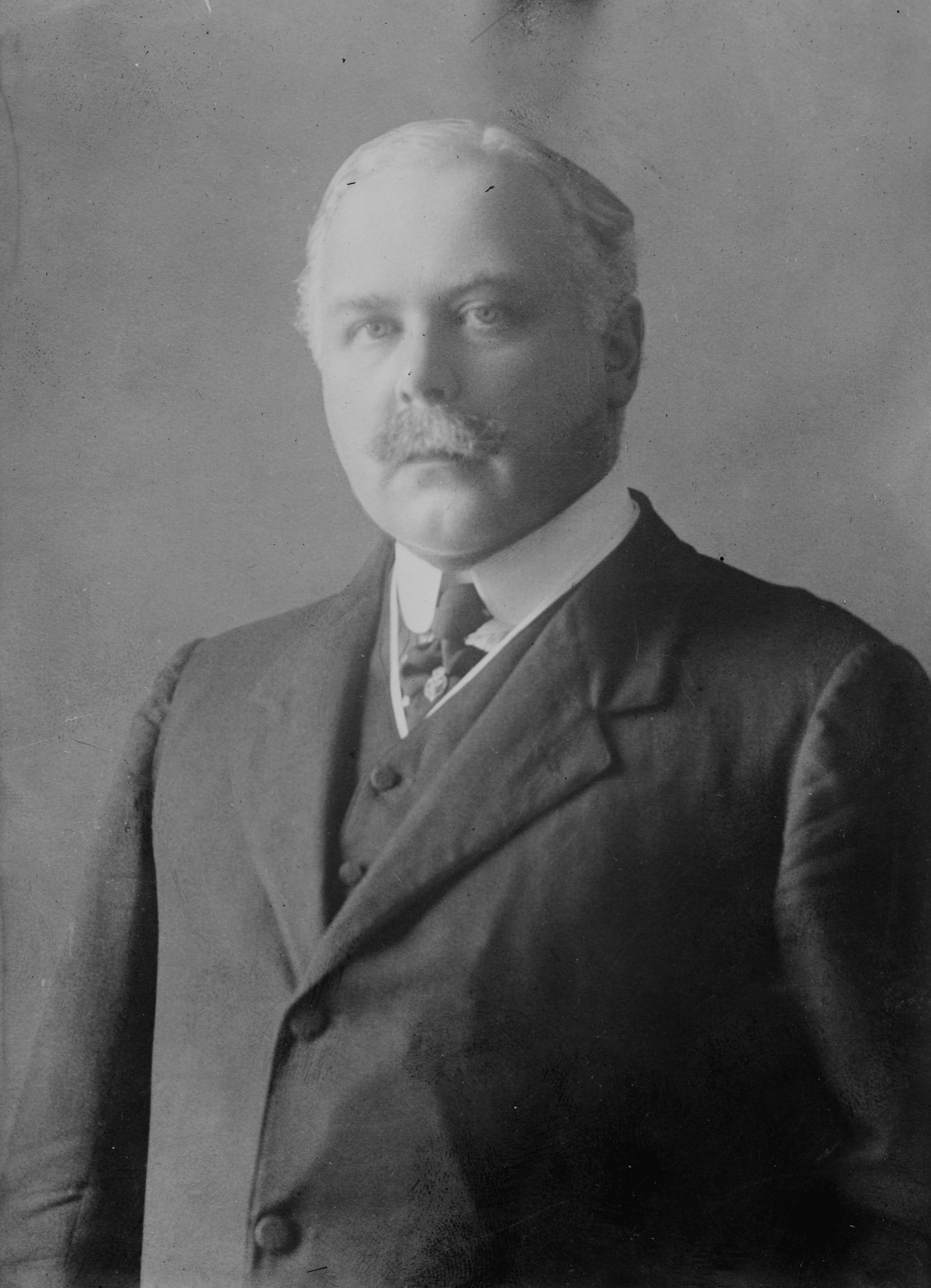

Government Chief Whip in the House of Commons; Parliamentary Secretary to the Treasury
- In office 14 February 1910 – 7 August 1912
- Monarchs: Edward VII; George V
- Prime Minister: H. H. Asquith
- Preceded by: Jack Pease
- Succeeded by: Percy Illingworth

Under-Secretary of State for India
- In office 5 June 1909 – 14 February 1910
- Prime Minister: H. H. Asquith
- Preceded by: Thomas Buchanan
- Succeeded by: Edwin Montagu

Comptroller of the Household
- In office 18 December 1905 – 5 June 1909
- Prime Minister: Henry Campbell-Bannerman; H. H. Asquith
- Preceded by: Arthur Annesley
- Succeeded by: Arthur Foljambe
Parliamentary offices
Member of Parliament for Midlothian
In office 15 January 1910 – 16 August 1912
Preceded by	Harry Primrose
Succeeded by	John Hope
In office 24 October 1900 – 8 February 1906
Preceded by	Thomas Gibson-Carmichael
Succeeded by	Harry Primrose
Member of Parliament for Peebles and Selkirk
In office 8 February 1906 – 15 January 1910
Preceded by	Walter Thorburn
Succeeded by	William Younger
Member of the House of Lords Lord Temporal
In office 16 August 1912 – 13 September 1920; Hereditary peerage
Preceded by	Peerage created
Succeeded by	Peerage extinct

Personal details
- Born: Alexander William Charles Oliphant Murray; 12 April 1870
- Died: 13 September 1920 (aged 50)
- Party: Liberal
- Spouse: Hilda Murray (d. 1929)
- Parents: Montolieu Oliphant-Murray (father); Blanche Alice (mother)
- Education: Cheltenham College

Alexander William Charles Oliphant Murray, 1st Baron Murray of Elibank PC (12 April 1870 – 13 September 1920), called The Master of Elibank between 1871 and 1912, was a Scottish nobleman and Liberal politician. He served as Parliamentary Secretary to the Treasury (Chief Government Whip) under H. H. Asquith between 1910 and 1912, when he was forced to resign after being implicated in the Marconi scandal.

== Background and education ==
Elibank was the eldest son of Montolieu Oliphant-Murray, 1st Viscount Elibank, and Blanche Alice, daughter of Edward John Scott. He was educated at Cheltenham.

== Political career ==
Elibank unsuccessfully contested Edinburgh West in May 1895, Peebles and Selkirk in July 1895 and the City of York by-election of 1900. However, in October 1900 he was successfully returned to parliament for Midlothian, a seat he held until 1906 and again from 1910 to 1912. From 1906 to 1910 he represented Peebles and Selkirk.

In the aftermath of the Second Boer War (1899-1902), Elibank travelled to South Africa visiting the Bechuanaland Protectorate, Johannesburg, Pretoria and Delagoa Bay.

When the Liberals came to power in December 1905 under Sir Henry Campbell-Bannerman, Elibank was appointed Comptroller of the Household, a post he retained when H. H. Asquith became Prime Minister in April 1908, and then served as Under-Secretary of State for India between 1909 and 1910. The latter year he was made Parliamentary Secretary to the Treasury (Chief Government Whip). In 1911 he was sworn of the Privy Council. However, he was forced to resign in August 1912 after being accused of insider trading in the Marconi scandal. Later the same month he was raised to the peerage as Baron Murray of Elibank, of Elibank in the County of Selkirk.

Apart from his political career Elibank was a partner in S. Pearson and Son Ltd.

== Personal life ==
Lord Murray of Elibank married Hilda Louisa Janey, daughter of Lieutenant-General Sir James Wolfe Murray, in 1894. They had no children. He died in September 1920, aged 50, predeceasing his father by seven years. The barony of Murray of Elibank became extinct on his death while his younger brother Gideon eventually succeeded in the viscountcy of Elibank. Lady Murray of Elibank died in September 1929.

Parliament of the United Kingdom
Preceded by Sir Thomas Gibson-Carmichael, Bt	Member of Parliament for Midlothian; 1900–1906	Succeeded by Lord Dalmeny
Preceded by Sir Walter Thorburn	Member of Parliament for Peebles and Selkirk; 1906–January 1910	Succeeded by William Younger
Preceded by Lord Dalmeny	Member of Parliament for Midlothian; January 1910–1912	Succeeded by John Augustus Hope
Political offices
Preceded by The Viscount Valentia	Comptroller of the Household; 1905–1909	Succeeded by The Earl of Liverpool
Preceded by Thomas Buchanan	Under-Secretary of State for India; 1909–1910	Succeeded by Hon. Edwin Samuel Montagu
Preceded by Jack Pease	Government Chief Whip in the House of Commons; Parliamentary Secretary to the Treasury; 1910–1912	Succeeded by Percy Illingworth
Party political offices
Preceded by Jack Pease	Liberal Chief Whip; 1910–1912	Succeeded by Percy Illingworth
Peerage of the United Kingdom
New creation	Baron Murray of Elibank; 1912–1920	Extinct
