= Walter Thorburn =

Scottish politician (1842–1908)

Sir Walter Thorburn
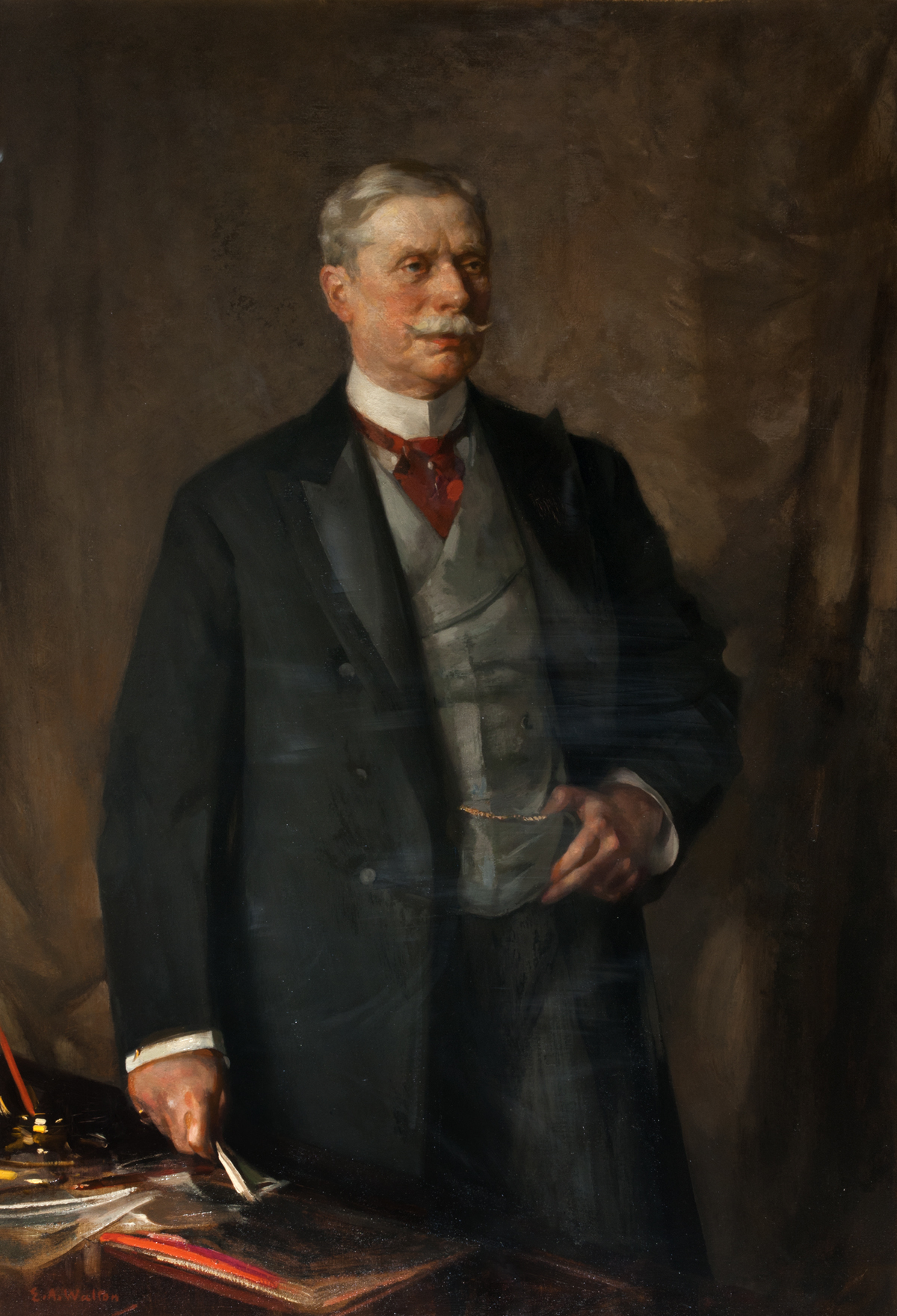
- Sir Walter Thorburn, 1907 portrait

Member of Parliament for Peebles and Selkirk
- In office 1 July 1886 – 12 January 1906
- Preceded by: Charles Tennant
- Succeeded by: Alexander Murray

Personal details
- Born: 1842
- Died: 10 November 1908 (aged 65–66)
- Party: Liberal Unionist Party

Sir Walter Thorburn (1842–1908) was a Scottish industrialist and Liberal Unionist Party politician who served as Member of Parliament for Peebles and Selkirk in the House of Commons of the United Kingdom from 1886 to 1906.

== Life ==
He was the third son of Walter Thorburn, a banker of Springwood, Peebles, and his wife Jane Grieve, born 22 November 1842. He became a director of Walter Thorburn Bros, Ltd., manufacturers of woollens, and a landowner. He was knighted in the 1900 New Years Honours List and awarded the insignia of a Knight Bachelor at an Investiture on 9 February 1900 at Osborne House by Queen Victoria.

Thorburn died on 10 November 1908.

== Family ==
Thorburn married in 1871 Elizabeth Jackson Scott, daughter of David Scott of Meadowfield, Duddingston. They had a family of four sons and six daughters.
