= Sir William Younger, 1st Baronet, of Auchen Castle =

British politician

William Younger

Sir William Younger, 1st Baronet (28 June 1862 – 28 July 1937) was a Scottish politician who served as a member of parliament (MP) for a total of 11 years between 1895 and 1910.

== Family ==
Younger was the son of William Younger, of Auchen Castle, Moffat, and his wife Margaret (née Brown), from Sydney, Australia. He was educated at Worcester College, Oxford.

He joined the British Army in 1884, taking up a commission with the 16th Lancers, but left in 1888 and married Helen Caroline Gunter, the daughter of Sir Robert Gunter, 1st Baronet, the Conservative MP for Barkston Ash in Yorkshire.

His residences were listed in 1901 as Auchen Castle, Moffat and 45 Prince's Gardens, London SW.

== Political career ==
He first stood for Parliament at the 1892 general election, when he was an unsuccessful Liberal Unionist candidate in Scotland for Orkney and Shetland.

Standing as a Conservative Party candidate, he was elected at the 1895 general election as the MP for the Stamford (or Kesteven) division of Lincolnshire in England. He was re-elected in 1900, but indicated by late 1902 that he would retire at the next election, and thus did not contest Stamford again at the 1906 election.

His next electoral contest was as a Liberal Party candidate at the January 1910 general election, when he returned to Scotland to be elected as the MP for Peebles and Selkirk, beating a Liberal Unionist candidate. He stood down from the House of Commons in December 1910 election.

He was made a baronet in July 1911, of Auchen Castle.

Parliament of the United Kingdom
Preceded by Henry Cust	Member of Parliament for Stamford; 1895–1906	Succeeded by Lord John Joicey-Cecil
Preceded by Alexander Murray, Master of Elibank	Member of Parliament for Peebles and Selkirk; January 1910 – December 1910	Succeeded by Sir Donald Maclean
Baronetage of the United Kingdom
New title	Baronet of Auchen Castle; 1911–1937	Succeeded by William Robert Younger
