= David Edwin Keir =

David Edwin Keir MBE (12 March 1906 – 9 June 1969), was a Scottish journalist and Liberal Party politician.

== Background ==
Keir was born the son of Rev. Thomas Keir of Dumfries and Edinburgh and Lily Jane Cross, of Bath. He was educated at Dumfries Academy and Edinburgh University where he obtained a Master of Arts. In 1939 he married Conservative politician Thelma Cazalet. They had no children. He was awarded the MBE in the 1946 Birthday Honours.

== Professional career ==
Keir was a journalist with the News Chronicle, and their parliamentary correspondent. He was Chairman of the Parliamentary Press Gallery and Lobby Correspondents from 1938 to 1939. During the Second World War he joined the Royal Navy Volunteer Reserve and reached the rank of Lieutenant-Commander.

== Political career ==
Keir was also a politician, his allegiance to the Liberal Party. He was President of Edinburgh University Union and Liberal Association in 1928. He unsuccessfully stood as a Liberal parliamentary candidate on four occasions. The first occasion was at the unpromising Midlothian and Peebles Northern by-election in early 1929 at the age of 23. He came third polling 16.6%. The second occasion was again at Midlothian and Peebles Northern at the 1929 General Election a few months later. He again came third polling 23.4%. The third occasion was at the 1931 General Election. He was Liberal candidate for winnable Roxburgh and Selkirk. He was hoping to oust the sitting Conservative MP, who in 1929 had a majority of 1,278 over the previous Liberal candidate. He lost to the Conservative this time by 3,974 in an election that was difficult for Liberal candidates challenging sitting members who also supported the National Government. The fourth occasion was at the East Fife by-election in 1933. On this occasion his candidacy was complicated by him not being the adopted candidate of the local Liberal Association. They had adopted another candidate who was a supporter of the National Government, who stood as a 'Liberal National'. Keir received public support from David Lloyd George as well as some leading figures within the Liberal Party. However he was not formally supported by the Liberal Party nationally because the party were still partners in the National Government. Unfortunately Keir, standing as an Independent Liberal, did not get sufficient local Liberal support to mount a decent campaign. He finished fourth with 7.6%. He did not stand for parliament again.
