= McCorkell Line =

Former shipping company

The McCorkell Line was a shipping line operated by Wm. McCorkell & Co. Ltd. from 1778, principally carrying passengers from Ireland, Scotland and England to the Americas. Notably, the McCorkell Line carried many immigrants who were fleeing the Great Irish Famine and sailed some of the most famous ships of the Western Ocean Ticket.

== Family background ==
It is said three brothers named McCorquodale, part of the Clan Gunn, arrived in Ireland after the defeat of Bonnie Prince Charlie following the rebellion in 1745, having escaped in an open boat from the west coast of Scotland and landed on the County Antrim Coast. Wishing to cover their tracks on arriving in Ireland they dropped the 'dale' and assumed the name McCorkell. However, recent discoveries show that the McCorkells have been in Ireland since the mid 16th century. One of the three brothers, William, who was born in 1728, established the shipping line in 1778. Descendants of William McCorkell include Sir Dudley, Colonel Sir Michael and David McCorkell.

== Shipping ==
Emigrant ship Mohongo

Londonderry Port was one of the main points for emigration to Canada and America with passengers traveling from Scotland, England and Ireland. From 1778, the company operated as Agents for ships sailing to and from County Londonderry. In 1800 William and Archibald McCorkell, sons of the founder started to expand the firm by using American owned ships, with voyages ranging from Canada to the West Indies. Their first ship was Marcus Hill, bought in 1815, at the conclusion of the American War; she continued to traverse the Atlantic until 1827. She was followed in 1824 by President. With the purchase of Caroline in 1834 and Erin in 1836, the McCorkell's began to collect oil paintings of each of their ships; these are still in family ownership. In 1851 the Mohongo, built in Canada, commenced her work in Atlantic trade, in her twenty years in the McCorkell Line, she completed more than 100 crossings with emigrants without any serious fault.

== Great Irish Famine ==
McCorkell ships carried passengers to Quebec, St. John's, Newfoundland and Labrador, Philadelphia, New York and New Orleans. Therefore, records show they were responsible for many of those fleeing the Great Irish Famine between 1845 and 1850.

== Minnehaha ==
By 1860, as speed became more important, Bartholomew McCorkell JP, who also served as Mayor of Derry in 1859–1862 and as High Sheriff of County Londonderry in 1878, commissioned a new ship to be built in New Brunswick, Canada. For twelve years, the Minnehaha, which cost $72,000, was able to cross the Atlantic in all weathers and even during the winter months whilst carrying passengers. Until this time all emigrants were only carried in spring and summer when conditions allowed. She was the most famous ship owned by the McCorkell's and was known as the "Green Yacht from Derry". The Minnehaha was named after the poem "The Song of Hiawatha" by Henry Wadsworth Longfellow.

Over the next thirty years, six more ships were to join the fleet named after the same poem. The Minnehaha was one of the few ships to trade in New York to the Federal side during the American Civil War. She carried many emigrants during the war as well as much needed supplies. After the war, Philadelphia became a regular port of call along with New York. Records in Philadelphia show, that 5,164 passengers were carried whose passage had been paid by relations in America to Robert Taylor & Co., the McCorkell agent at the port. Original tickets for these crossings still exist today as part of the family archive.

From 1873, steam liners were overtaking the famous sailing ships and although the McCorkell Line continued to carry passengers until 1897, the main activity now became cargo. The advert Minnehaha was converted to a barque in 1880 to reduce the number of crew by the removal of one set of mainsails. She served thirty-five years with the company until she was sold in 1895. Other famous ships were the Village Belle with twenty-five years service, the Oweenee, the Osseo and the Hiawatha. The latter completed twenty-one years and was the last vessel owned when sold in 1897. She was later sunk by enemy action in 1916.

== Recent years ==
The family have continued to serve Derry throughout the twentieth century, Sir Dudley McCorkell was the Mayor of Derry from 1930 to 1934 and attended the Ottawa Conference on Trade in 1933. Sir Dudley, along with his nephew Colonel Sir Michael, who succeeded him, served as Harbour Board Commissioners and as Chairmen of Wm. McCorkell. Michael's son John was a driving force for the relocation of the port of Derry from the city to Lisahally in 1990. In January 2008, a set of prints of the McCorkell ships were donated to Altnagelvin Hospital, in memory of the late Colonel Sir Michael and to mark the contributions, over the generations, of the McCorkell family to Derry.

A quote from a January 2010 BBC web article reads, "Ask anybody in Derry, and they'll say it's no secret the north west played a central role in history. Now that knowledge is to be shared with the rest of the globe, as part of a BBC project to tell the history of the world through a digital museum. Twenty-five objects have been selected to form the basis of Northern Ireland's cyber-exhibit." One of these objects is the Figurehead of the Minnehaha, which is in the Harbour Museum, Derry.

In 2020, the BBC NI Ulster Scots programme 'The Lang Hame', Episode 1, featured Bartholomew McCorkell's grave and covered his contribution to Derry life. It also featured Lady (Aileen) McCorkell.
