= John Colville, 1st Baron Clydesmuir =

Scottish Unionist politician and industrialist

Colonel The Right Honourable The Lord Clydesmuir GCIE PC
- Colville in 1931

Governor of Bombay
- In office 24 March 1943 – 5 January 1948
- Preceded by: Roger Lumley
- Succeeded by: Raja Maharaj Singh

Secretary of State for Scotland
- In office 6 May 1938 – 10 May 1940
- Prime Minister: Neville Chamberlain
- Preceded by: Walter Elliot
- Succeeded by: Ernest Brown

Financial Secretary to the Treasury
- In office 29 October 1936 – 6 May 1938
- Prime Minister: Stanley Baldwin; Neville Chamberlain
- Preceded by: William Morrison
- Succeeded by: Euan Wallace

Under-Secretary of State for Scotland
- In office 28 November 1935 – 29 October 1936
- Prime Minister: Stanley Baldwin
- Preceded by: Noel Skelton
- Succeeded by: Henry Scrymgeour-Wedderburn

Member of Parliament for Midlothian and Peebles Northern
- In office 30 May 1929 – January 1943
- Preceded by: Andrew Clarke
- Succeeded by: Sir David King Murray

Personal details
- Born: 13 February 1894 Cleland, Lanarkshire, Scotland
- Died: 31 October 1954 (aged 60)
- Party: Unionist
- Spouse: Agnes Anne Bilsland
- Children: 3, including Ronald Colville, 2nd Baron Clydesmuir
- Education: Charterhouse, Trinity College, Cambridge

David John Colville, 1st Baron Clydesmuir, GCIE, PC (13 February 1894 – 31 October 1954), was a Scottish Unionist politician, colonial administrator, and industrialist. He was director of his family's steel and iron business, David Colville & Sons as well as the final Governor of Bombay.

== Early life and education ==
The only son of John Colville MP, of Cleland, Lanarkshire, and Christina Marshall Colville, he was educated at Charterhouse and at Trinity College, Cambridge.

He served in World War I with the 6th Battalion of the Cameronians (Scottish Rifles), and was wounded.

== Political career ==
He was unsuccessful National Liberal candidate for Motherwell at the 1922 general election. Switching to the Conservative Party, Colville was unsuccessful again at a by-election in January 1929 for Midlothian and Peebles Northern, but won the seat the general election in May 1929, remaining as the constituency's Member of Parliament (MP) until 1943. He served in the National Government as Parliamentary Secretary to the Department of Overseas Trade from 1931 to 1935, as Under-Secretary of State for Scotland from 1935 to 1936, as Financial Secretary to the Treasury from 1936 to 1938 and as Secretary of State for Scotland from 1938 until 1940.

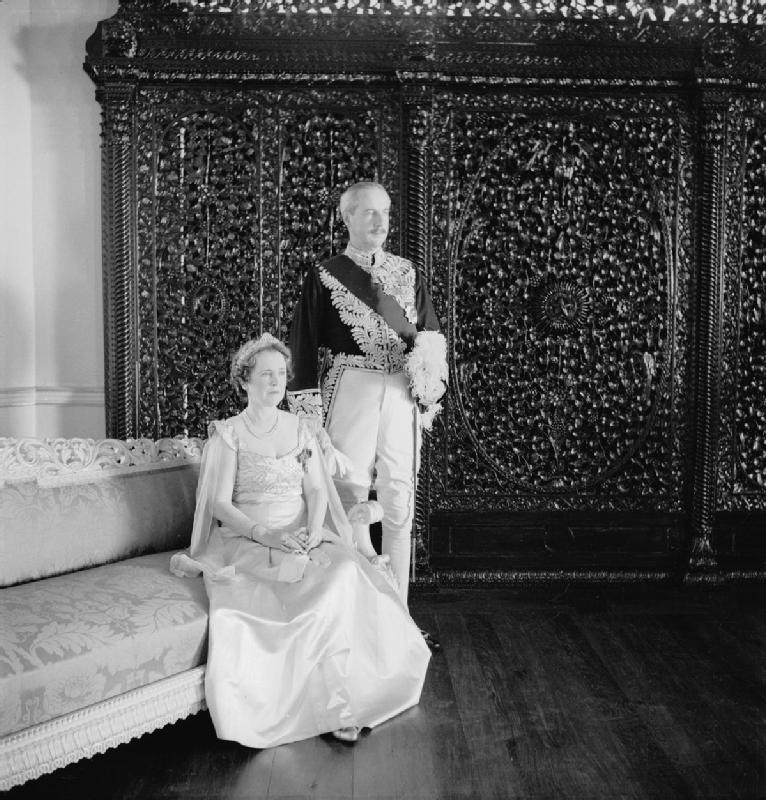
The Baron and his wife as governor and vice-regal consort of Bombay (now Mumbai)

== Diplomatic career and peerage ==
Colville left Parliament in 1943 to become Governor of Bombay, a post he held until January 1948. He acted as Viceroy and Governor-General of India, in 1945, 1946 and 1947. On his return from India he was raised to the peerage as Baron Clydesmuir, of Braidwood in the County of Lanarkshire. From 1950 to 1954 Lord Clydesmuir served as a Governor of the BBC.

Colville was appointed a Privy Counsellor in 1936 and was a Brigadier in the Royal Company of Archers. He was Lord Lieutenant of Lanarkshire from 1952 until his death.

== Marriage and children ==
He married Agnes Anne Bilsland, daughter of Sir William Bilsland, in 1915. They had a son. Later he married Helen Markillie born in California. They had two daughters Mary Helen and Ann.

His son, Ronald Colville, 2nd Baron Clydesmuir, served as Governor of the Bank of Scotland.

== Arms ==
Coat of arms of John Colville, 1st Baron Clydesmuir
Crest A Hind's Head erased proper Escutcheon Argent a Cross Moline Sable on a Chief of the last a Thistle slipped proper between two Bulls' Heads also Argent Supporters Dexter: a Roebuck; Sinister: a Doe, both proper Motto Oublier Ne Puis (I cannot forget)

Parliament of the United Kingdom
Preceded by Andrew Bathgate Clarke	Member of Parliament for Midlothian and Peebles Northern; 1929–1943	Succeeded by Sir David King Murray
Political offices
Preceded by William Morrison	Financial Secretary to the Treasury; 1936–1938	Succeeded by Euan Wallace
Preceded by Walter Elliot	Secretary of State for Scotland; 1938–1940	Succeeded by Ernest Brown
Preceded by Sir Lawrence Lumley	Governor of Bombay; 1943–1947	Succeeded by Raja Sir Maharaj Singh
Honorary titles
Preceded by The Lord Hamilton of Dalzell	Lord Lieutenant of Lanarkshire; 1952–1954	Succeeded by Sir Alexander Murray Stephen
Peerage of the United Kingdom
New creation	Baron Clydesmuir; 1948–1954	Succeeded by Ronald John Bilsland Colville
