= Andrew Clarke (British politician) =

British Labour Party politician

Andrew Bathgate Clarke (5 February 1868 – 1 February 1940) was a British Labour Party politician who served as the member of parliament (MP) for Midlothian and Peebles Northern for two short periods in the 1920s.

He first contested the seat at 1922 general election, and won it in 1923, with a 9.6% majority over the sitting Conservative Party MP Sir George Hutchison. At the 1924 general election, Hutchison retook the seat, but died in office in December 1928. Clarke won the seat back at the resulting by-election in January 1929, but only held it for 121 days until the general election in May 1929. He unsuccessfully contested the seat one more time, at the 1931 election.

Parliament of the United Kingdom
Preceded by Sir George Hutchison	Member of Parliament for Midlothian & Peebles Northern; 1923 – 1924	Succeeded by Sir George Hutchison
Preceded by Sir George Hutchison	Member of Parliament for Midlothian & Peebles Northern; January 1929 – May 1929	Succeeded by John Colville
Trade union offices
Preceded by Joseph Young	Secretary of the Mid and East Lothian Miners' Association; 1919–1940	Succeeded by Alexander Cameron
Preceded by James Doonan	President of the National Union of Scottish Mine Workers; 1932–1940	Succeeded by Abe Moffat
