= Denis Desmond =

British company director and public administrator

Sir Denis Fitzgerald Desmond KCVO, CBE

Lord Lieutenant of County Londonderry
- In office 2000–2018
- Succeeded by: Mrs Alison Millar

Personal details
- Born: 1943 (age 82–83) United Kingdom
- Education: Trinity College, Glenalmond, Perthshire
- Occupation: Company director, public administrator
- Awards: Commander of the Order of the British Empire (1989); Knight Commander of the Royal Victorian Order (2018); Freedom of the Borough of Causeway Coast and Glens (2018)

Military service
- Service: Territorial Army (1964–1969)
- Rank: Officer

Sir Denis Fitzgerald Desmond, KCVO, CBE (born 1943) is a retired British company director and public administrator, who was Lord Lieutenant of County Londonderry from 2000 to 2018.

Desmond was born in 1943, the son of an army officer. He served as an officer in the Territorial Army from 1964 to 1969, for the two years as aide-de-camp to Governor of Northern Ireland. In 1970, he became chairman of Desmond and Sons Ltd, his family's clothing business; he stepped down as chairman in 2005. He also sat on the board of Ulster Bank in the 1990s and was council member for The Prince's Trust Northern Ireland between 2008 and 2012.

In the public sphere, Desmond was High Sheriff of County Londonderry in 1974, and appointed a deputy lieutenant in 1992, eight years before he became lord lieutenant.

He was appointed a Commander of the Order of the British Empire in 1989 and a Knight Commander of the Royal Victorian Order in 2018 (on his retirement as lord lieutenant). He has received honorary doctorates from the Queen's University Belfast and the Ulster University, and in 2018 received the Freedom of the Borough of Causeway Coast and Glens.
