= 1929 Midlothian and Peebles Northern by-election =

UK parliamentary by-election

The 1929 Midlothian and Peebles Northern by-election was a parliamentary by-election held in Scotland on 29 January 1929 to elect a new Member of Parliament (MP) for the UK House of Commons constituency of Midlothian and Peebles Northern.

It is notable as the first election to the Parliament of the United Kingdom to be contested by a candidate for a Scottish nationalist party.

== Vacancy ==
The vacancy was caused by the death in December 1928 of the constituency's Unionist MP, Sir George Hutchison. He had held the seat from 1922 to 1923 and from 1924 until his death.

== Previous result ==
General election 1924: Midlothian and Peebles Northern
Party	Candidate	Votes	%	±%
Conservative	George Hutchison	11,320	55.2	+19.5
Labour	Andrew Clarke	9,173	44.8	−0.5
Majority		2,147	10.4	N/A
Turnout		20,493	79.2	+4.5
Conservative hold		Swing	+10.0	

== Candidates ==
Four candidates were nominated.

The Labour Party nominated Andrew Clarke, who had held the seat from 1923 to 1924. The Conservatives nominated the industrialist John Colville, who had been the National Liberal candidate for Motherwell in 1922.

The local Liberal association selected 23-year-old David Edwin Keir as their candidate. He was the son of the Rev. T. Keir of Dumfries. He was educated at Dumfries Academy and the University of Edinburgh.

The fourth candidate was the journalist and folklorist Lewis Spence of the National Party of Scotland, who was the first nationalist to contest a parliamentary seat in Scotland.

== Result ==
The result was a victory for the Labour Party candidate, Andrew Clarke, who took the seat with a slightly lower share of the vote than in his defeat in 1924, when there had been only two candidates.

With only 4.5% of the votes, Spence lost his £150 deposit.

By-election Jan 1929: Midlothian and Peebles Northern
Party	Candidate	Votes	%	±%
Labour	Andrew Clarke	7,917	42.0	+2.8
Conservative	John Colville	6,965	36.9	−18.3
Liberal	David Edwin Keir	3,130	16.6	New
National (Scotland)	Lewis Spence	842	4.5	New
Majority		952	5.1	N/A
Turnout		18,854	66.0	−13.2
Labour gain from Conservative		Swing	+7.8	

== Aftermath ==
Clarke's victory was short-lived. At the general election on 30 May 1929, Colville won the seat, and although Clarke stood again in 1931, the by-election victory was his last electoral success.

Colville held the seat for fourteen years, holding a variety of ministerial posts, and left Parliament in 1943 to become Governor of Bombay, triggering another by-election. He was ennobled in 1948 as Baron Clydesmuir.

== See also ==
- List of United Kingdom by-elections
- 1943 Midlothian and Peebles Northern by-election
