= McCorkell =

McCorkell is a surname. Notable people with the surname include:

- Aileen McCorkell, founder of the Derry Branch of the Red Cross
- David McCorkell (born 1955), Lord Lieutenant of County Antrim (from 2019)
- Sir Dudley McCorkell (1883–1960), Mayor of Londonderry (1929–1935), and ex officio member of the Senate of Northern Ireland and former Lord Lieutenant of County Londonderry
- Gordon McCorkell (born 1983), Scottish actor
- Jenna McCorkell (born 1986)) is a British figure skater from Coleraine
- Jock McCorkell (born 1918), former Australian rules footballer in the Victorian Football League
- Lisa McCorkell, American public health researcher
- Colonel Sir Michael McCorkell (1925–2006), former Lord Lieutenant of County Londonderry, Northern Irish soldier and public servant
- Neil McCorkell, wicketkeeper for Hampshire County Cricket Club
- Ross McCorkell, Scottish-American drag queen

== See also ==
- McCorkell Line, operated by Wm. McCorkell & Co. Ltd. from 1778, carrying passengers from Ireland, Scotland and England to the Americas
