= Ronald Colville, 2nd Baron Clydesmuir =

Scottish soldier and businessman

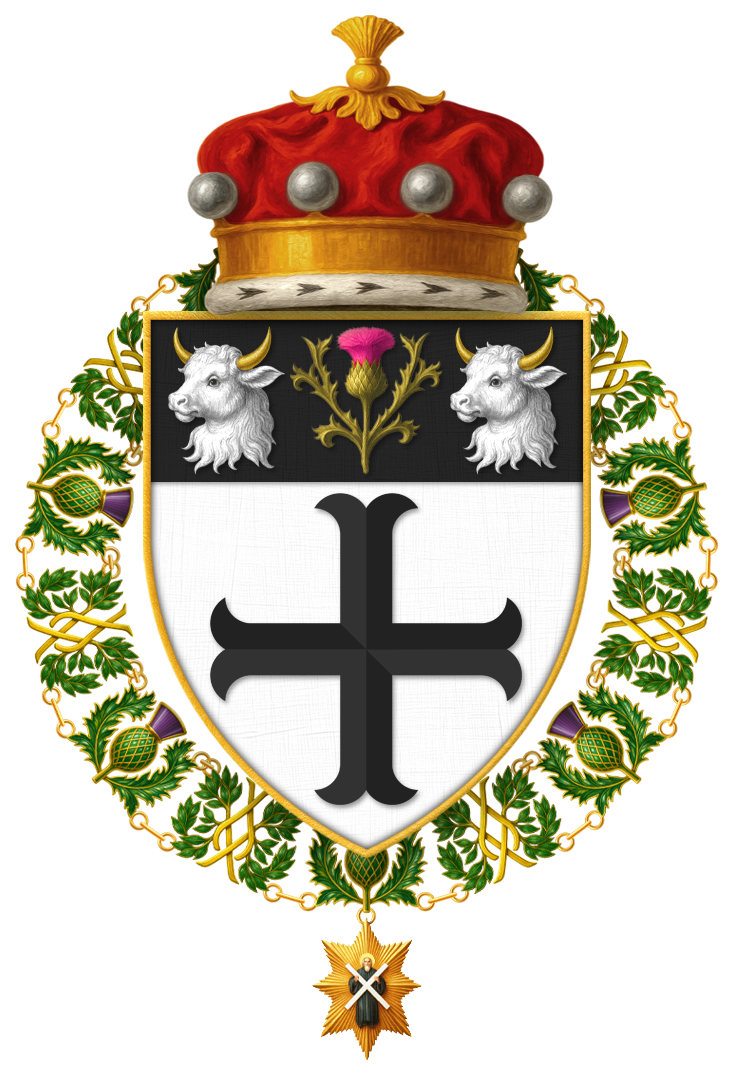
Shield of Arms of Ronald John Bilsland Colville, 2nd Baron Clydesmuir, KT, CB, MBE, TD

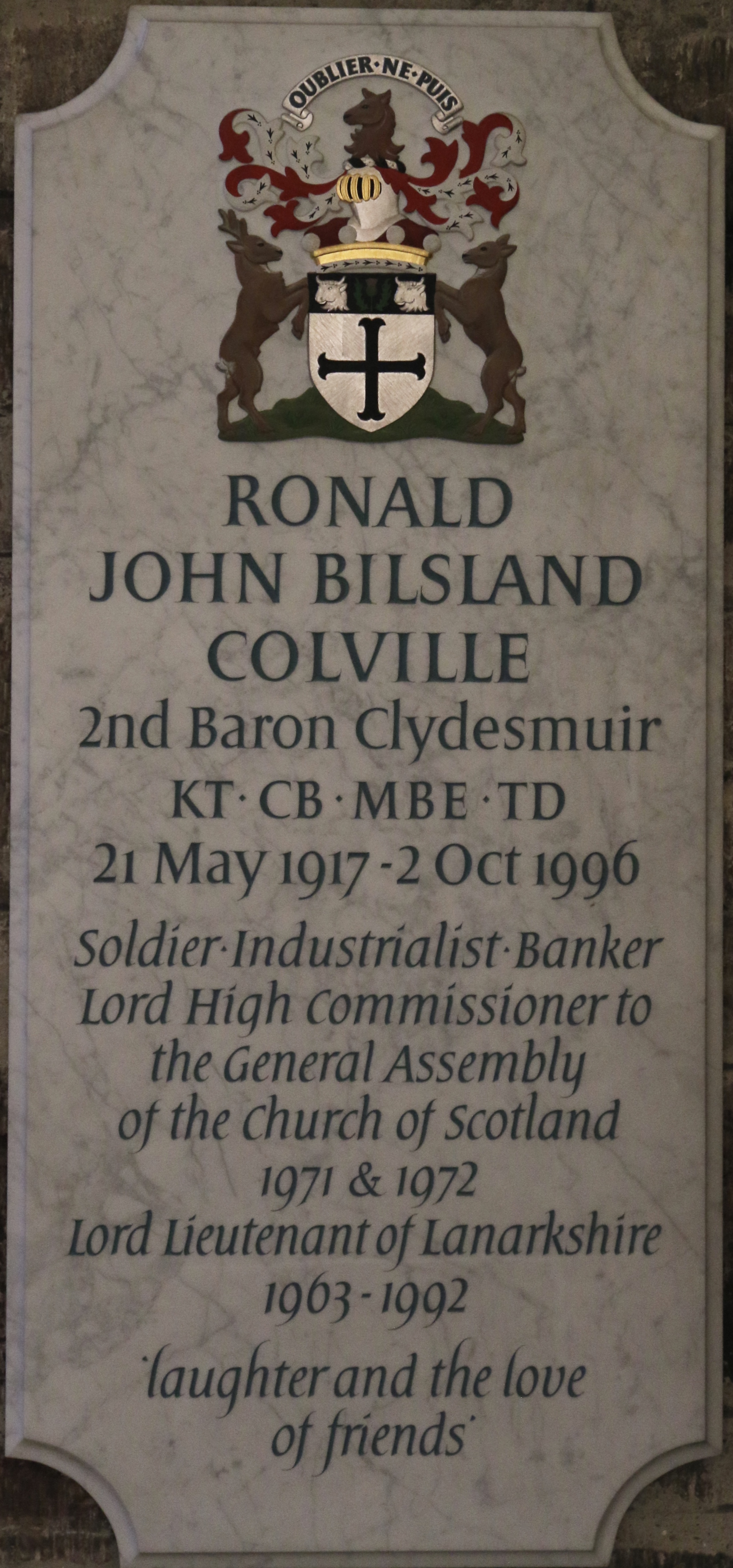
Memorial in St. Giles' Cathedral

Ronald John Bilsland Colville, 2nd Baron Clydesmuir, KT, CB, MBE, TD (21 May 1917 – 2 October 1996), was a Scottish soldier and businessman. He notably served as Governor of the Bank of Scotland, Lord Lieutenant of Lanarkshire, and Captain General of the Queen's Bodyguard in Scotland. According to his obituary, he was described as "an outstanding and dedicated servant of Scotland. He was a gentleman of the old school with a genial wit and great generosity of spirit".

== Early life ==
Colville was born in Glasgow in 1917, the only son of John Colville, Secretary of State for Scotland (1938–1940), who became Governor of Bombay (1943–1948) and acted as Viceroy and Governor-General of India on three occasions. John Colville was raised to the peerage in 1948 as Baron Clydesmuir. Like his father, Ronald was educated at Charterhouse and at Trinity College, Cambridge.

== Military career ==
After graduating from Cambridge in 1939 at the age of 22, Colville was drawn into World War II. The tradition of service being already ingrained, he joined a Scottish regiment, the Cameronians (Scottish Rifles), in which his father had served in World War I. Clydesmuir was in action with the regiment at Dunkirk, in Italy, and in the Normandy landings, was awarded the MBE and mentioned in dispatches, serving throughout World War II and for a short time thereafter. The Cameronians were famously recruited from Glasgow and the Lanarkshire area, the industrial heart of Scotland. Clydesmuir's obituary noted that "he always remained a West of Scotland man respecting and sharing the down-to-earth qualities of the men with whom he had fought. It was typical of him and of them that some of his merriest and most affectionate anecdotes, (and he was a master story-teller), had to do with the lighter off-duty events of these dangerous days and with the lifelong friends he made among his comrades in arms".

His military experiences poignantly influenced his later life, and after the war, he continued his connections with the Army. Among his other appointments, he became Chairman of the Council of the Territorial, Auxiliary and Volunteer Associations (1969–1973), and later President, (1974–1981); commanded the 6/7th (Territorial) battalion of the Cameronians, and later became Honorary Colonel (1967–1971); he was also Honorary Colonel of the 52nd Lowland Volunteers, TA&VR (1970–1975). His obituary also noted that "he never lost the upright and alert bearing, the directness of speech and method, and the disciplined self-control he had acquired in his army days. Nor did he forget the debts owed to the men who had served with him and, in many cases, suffered and died".

== Business career ==
in 1958, he became a director of Colvilles Limited. He would also find success in the Scottish Council (Development & Industry), a body established in the thirties under the leadership of his uncle, Lord Bilsland, to encourage the introduction of new, lighter industries to reduce the over-dependence of central Scotland on declining heavy industry and to develop export markets. After the war, the efforts to this effect continued with considerable success. Clydesmuir joined the Executive Committee in 1954, became its chairman in 1966, and President of the Council in 1972, an appointment he held until 1986. In these roles, he worked in productive association with successive chief executives, and he led trade missions to the Soviet Union and China.

Despite dedicating his time to various voluntary organizations, Colville became increasingly preoccupied with business interests, particularly in the field of banking and finance and in the developing Scottish oil and gas industry. Since his appearance on the scene after the war, he had been in demand as a non-executive director. Among his early appointments was as a director of the British Linen Bank, then a wholly owned subsidiary of Barclays Bank. He was appointed Governor of that bank in 1966, and on its merger with the Bank of Scotland in 1971, he became Deputy Governor of the merged bank. In 1972, on the resignation of Lord Polwarth to take up a political appointment, he was elected Governor of the Bank of Scotland, an office he held until his retirement in 1981. During his time as governor of the bank, he was also a director of Barclays Bank. His period as Governor of the Bank of Scotland saw many changes, such as the completion of the integration of the two banks and thereafter in the use of new technology and in the expansion of the bank's business domestically within Scotland, England, and internationally.

== Honours ==
His obituary noted "the distinctions and honors bestowed upon Lord Clydesmuir are indicative of the high regard in which he was held. In addition to his war-time awards, he was appointed CB in 1965 and became a Knight of the Thistle in 1972. He was Lord High Commissioner to the General Assembly of the Church of Scotland, in 1971 and 1972. He held office as Lord Lieutenant of Lanarkshire from 1963 to 1992, having been Deputy Lieutenant (1955–1959) and Vice-Lieutenant (1959–1963). He was a long-serving member of the Royal Company of Archers, Queen's Body Guard for Scotland, and from 1986 until shortly before his death he held the office of Captain General. He also held honorary degrees awarded by Strathclyde and Heriot-Watt Universities."

In 1978, he was elected an Honorary Fellow of the Royal Society of Edinburgh.

== Family ==
Clydesmuir, whose family name was Colville, was from a long-established Scottish family. He was a great-grandson of David Colville, founder of the large iron and steel enterprise Colvilles Limited, which would become a powerful force in the industrial development of the United Kingdom; and son of John Colville, a former Secretary of State for Scotland (1938–40), who became Governor of Bombay (1943–1948) and acted as Viceroy and Governor-General of India on three occasions. He was raised to the peerage in 1948 as the first Baron Clydesmuir of Braidwood. He succeeded to the title in 1954 on the death of his father. Lord Bilsland, another Scottish Industrialist, was his uncle. He married Joan Booth, daughter of Lieutenant-Colonel E.B. Booth. Joan's younger sister was Lady McCorkell OBE who married Colonel Sir Michael McCorkell.

Peerage of the United Kingdom
Preceded by John Colville	Baron Clydesmuir; 1954–1996	Succeeded by David Colville
