= Baron Clydesmuir =

Title in the Peerage of the United Kingdom

Baron Clydesmuir, of Braidwood in the County of Lanark, Scotland, is a title in the Peerage of the United Kingdom. It was created in 1948 for the Unionist politician John Colville. He served as Secretary of State for Scotland from 1938 to 1940. His son, the second Baron, was Governor of the Bank of Scotland and Lord Lieutenant of Lanarkshire. As of 2010 the title is held by the latter's son, the third Baron, who succeeded in 1996.

John Colville, father of the first Baron, represented North East Lanarkshire in the House of Commons as a Liberal.

== Barons Clydesmuir (1948) ==
- (David) John Colville, 1st Baron Clydesmuir (1894–1954)
- Ronald John Bilsland Colville, 2nd Baron Clydesmuir (1917–1996)
- David Ronald Colville, 3rd Baron Clydesmuir (born 1949)

The heir apparent is the present holder's son, the Hon. Richard David Ronald Colville (born 1980).

=== Line of succession ===
- David John Colville, 1st Baron Clydesmuir (1894–1954)
  - Lt.-Col. Ronald John Bilsland Colville, 2nd Baron Clydesmuir (1917–1996)
    - David Ronald Colville, 3rd Baron Clydesmuir (born 1949)
      - (1) Hon. Richard David Ronald Colville (born 1980)
      - (2) Hon. Hamish Colville (born 1989)
    - (3) Hon. Andrew John Colville (born 1953)
      - (4) Patrick Edwin Ronald Colville (born 1988)
