= John Cherry Drennan =

UNION POLITICIAN

John Cherry Drennan CBE JP DL (1899 – 28 December 1982) was a unionist politician in Northern Ireland.

Born in Limavady, Drennan studied at Foyle College before working as a farmer. He became active in the Ulster Unionist Party, and served for it in the Senate of Northern Ireland from 1961 until it was prorogued in 1972. From 1965 to 1974, he served as Lord Lieutenant of County Londonderry.

Honorary titles
| Preceded by Henry Mulholland | Lord Lieutenant of County Londonderry; 1965–1974 | Succeeded by Michael McCorkell |
