= 1943 Midlothian and Peebles Northern by-election =

UK by-election

The 1943 Midlothian and Peebles Northern by-election was a parliamentary by-election held in Scotland on 11 February 1943 to elect a new Member of Parliament (MP) for the UK House of Commons constituency of Midlothian and Peebles Northern.

It was notable for the strong showing of the Common Wealth Party candidate.

== Vacancy ==
The vacancy was caused by the resignation in January 1943 of the constituency's Unionist MP, John Colville, to take up the post of Governor of Bombay. He had held the seat since the 1929 general election.

== Candidates ==
During the Second World War, the parties in the Coalition Government had agreed not to contest by-elections in seats held by other coalition parties, and many wartime by-elections were therefore unopposed.

The Unionist Party nominated Sir David King Murray, the Solicitor General for Scotland, who may have expected to be returned unopposed. The Labour, Liberal and Liberal National parties upheld the agreement, but other parties who disagreed with the truce could not be prevented from standing as independent candidates, and nor could other minor parties. In this case, the newly formed Common Wealth Party nominated its candidate Tom Wintringham, one of the party's founders.

== Result ==
The result was a victory for the Unionist candidate, Sir David King Murray, but with a massively-reduced majority. At the 1935 general election, the Unionist majority over the Labour Party candidate had been 25.8% of the votes, but Wintringham cut that to 3.8%.

By-election 1943: Midlothian and Peebles Northern
Party	Candidate	Votes	%	±%
Unionist	David King Murray	11,620	51.9	−11.0
Common Wealth	Tom Wintringham	10,751	48.1	New
Majority		869	3.8	−22.0
Turnout		22,371	34.6	−39.7
Unionist hold		Swing	−11.0	

== Aftermath ==
A week after the by-election, Nazi propaganda minister Josef Goebbels cited Common Wealth's strong showing as evidence of a communist resurgence in Britain. Making his famous total war speech to an audience of Nazi loyalists in Berlin's Sportpalast, Goebbels said: "In a recent by-election for the House of Commons, the independent, that is communist, candidate got 10,741 of the 22,371 votes cast. This was in a district that had formerly been a conservative stronghold. Within a short time, 10,000 voters, nearly half, had been lost to the communists. That is proof that the Bolshevist danger exists in England [sic] too, and that it will not go away simply because it is ignored."

King Murray held the seat only until the post-war general election in July 1945, when he stood down to be a Senator of the College of Justice and a Lord of Session.

Wintringham stood in Aldershot at the 1945 general election, but without success. His wife Kitty contested Midlothian and Peebles Northern in 1945, but won only 6.4% of the votes and lost her deposit.

== See also ==
- List of United Kingdom by-elections
- 1929 Midlothian and Peebles Northern by-election
