= British Red Cross Badge of Honour =

Award badge

The British Red Cross Badge of Honour, instituted in 1958, is an award badge given to people who show exceptional service to the British Red Cross.

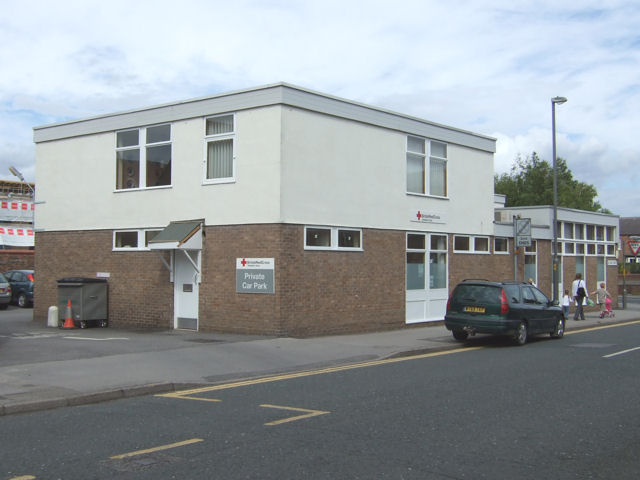
Northallerton - British Red Cross Centre The British Red Cross Centre in Northallerton at the junction of East Road and Zetland Street

The Badge has 3 classes:

Class 1 "Badge of Honour for Devoted Service"
Class 2 "Badge of Honour for Distinguished Service"
Class 3 "Queens Badge of Honour"

Up until at least 2013 the Badge of Honour was awarded in one of 4 classes as follows with associated post nominal letters:

Badge of Honour for Devoted Service BH(D)

Badge of Honour for Distinguished Service BH(DS)

Badge of Honour for Outstanding Service BH(OS)

The Kings/Queens Badge of Honour BH(K/Q)

== Badge of Honour for Devoted Service ==
This award is given to volunteers and staff who have given devoted service to the Society. The badge is accompanied by a certificate, which is signed by the chairman of the board. The criteria for this award will include the demonstration of service above and beyond the call of duty and actions showing the nominee’s personal involvement and commitment over a longer period of time, furthermore the recipient's actions should include devoted and consistent service, showing loyalty and dependability, as well as a certain amount of self-sacrifice and determination. As a general rule, a minimum period of five years of service should have been completed before receiving this award. Exceptional circumstances may arise when it would be acceptable to make the award sooner.

== Badge of Honour for Distinguished Service ==
The award is given to volunteers and staff for distinguished or exceptional service to the Society. The badge is accompanied by a certificate, which is signed by the chairman of the board. The recipient should have shown an element of self-sacrifice in time and effort, and should also have demonstrated the ability to initiate innovative ideas, maintain enthusiasm and expand training and service to the community.

== Queen's Badge of Honour ==
This award may be awarded to any person by the trustees, with the approval of the president of the society, His Royal Highness The Prince of Wales, for exceptional service of the highest order to the Society or to the International Red Cross and Red Crescent Movement. The award is accompanied by a certificate, which is signed by the president. The award is limited to thirty holders at any one time.
