= George Hutchison (British politician) =

British politician

Sir George Aitken Clark Hutchison KC JP (6 July 1873 – 22 December 1928) was an advocate mainly remembered in his role as a politician as a Scottish Unionist who served as the Member of Parliament for Midlothian and Peebles Northern from 1922 to 1923, and from 1924 until his death.

== Life ==
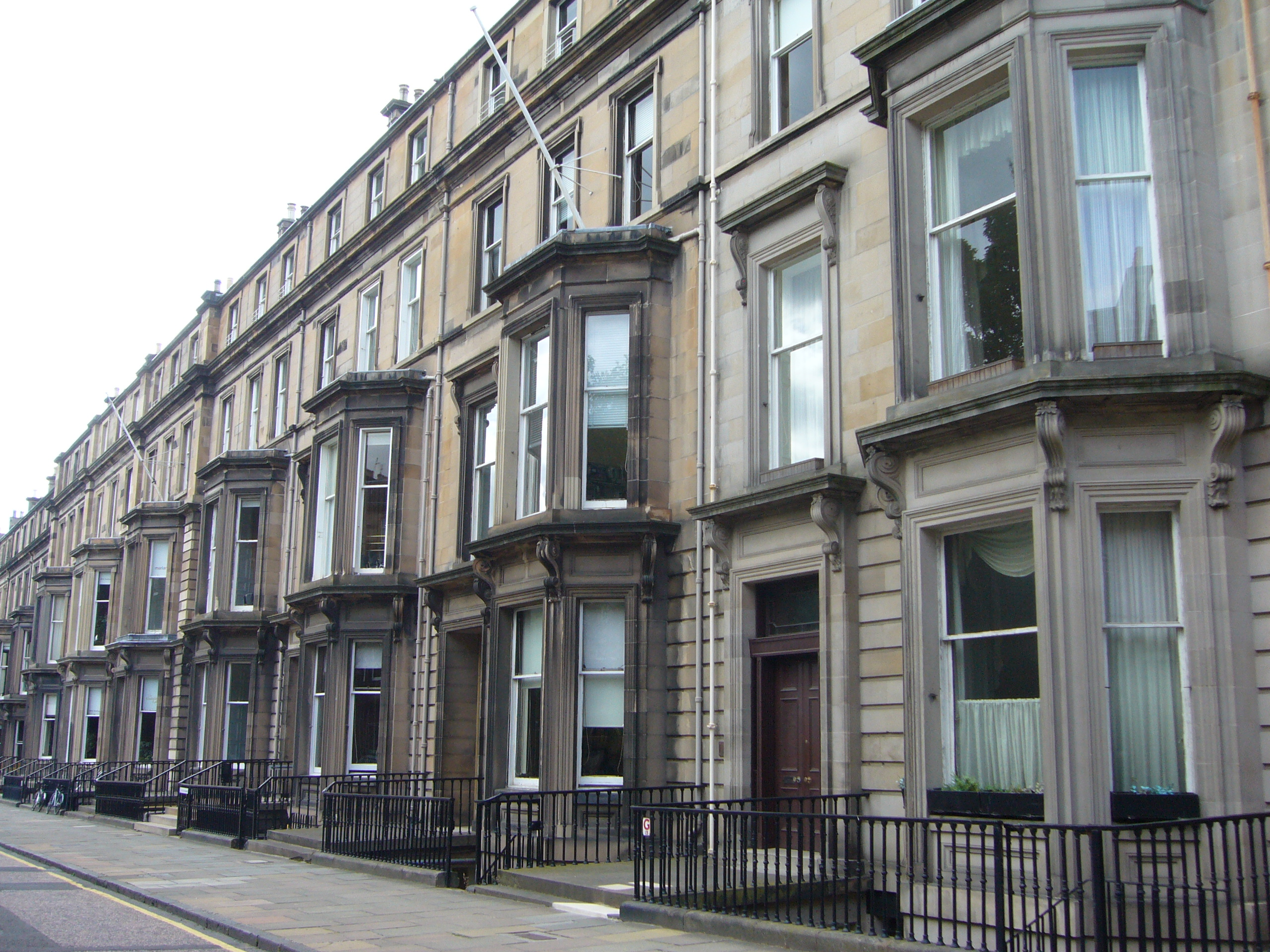
Drumsheugh Gardens, Edinburgh

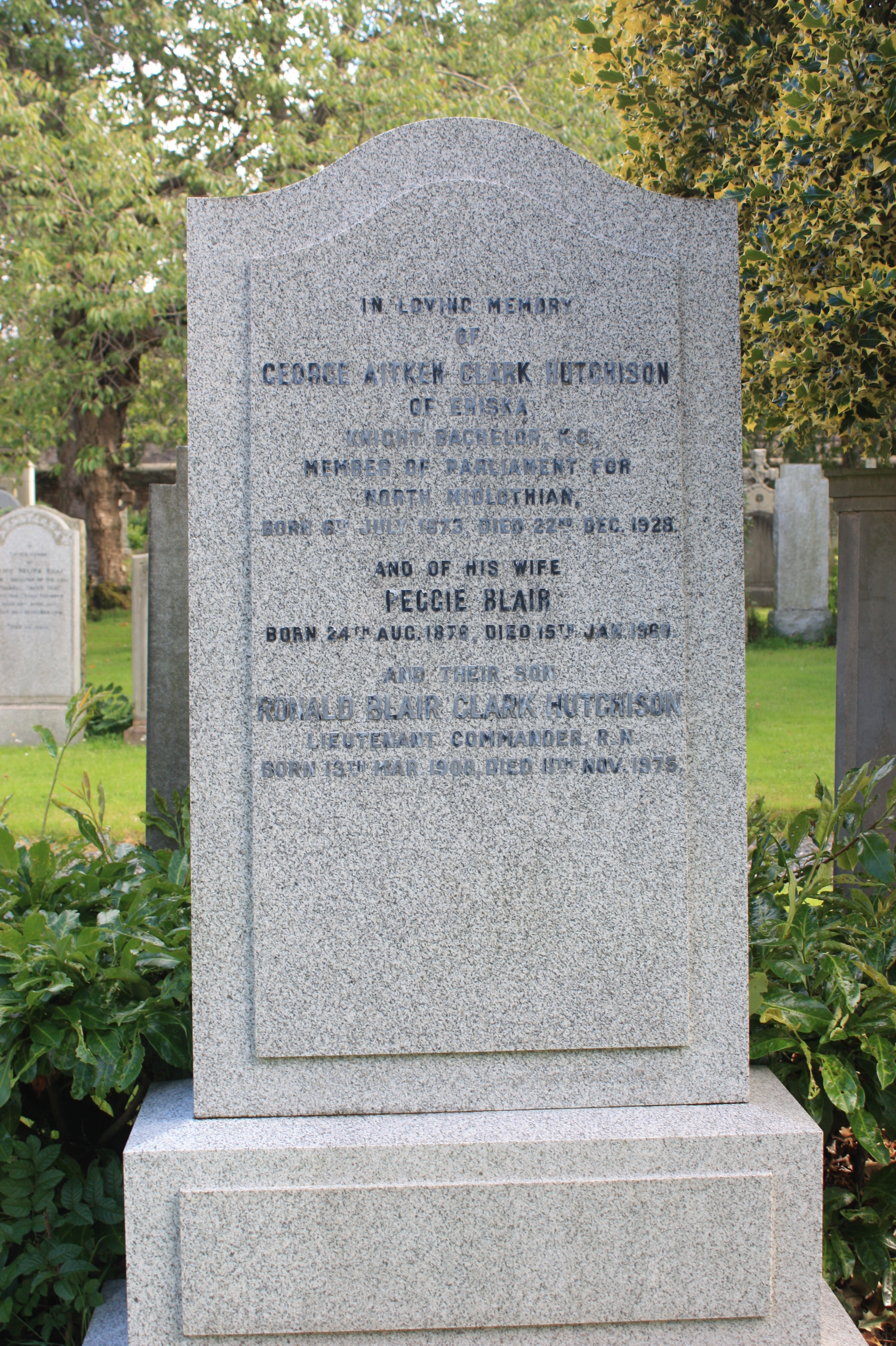
The grave of George Hutchison MP, Dean Cemetery, Edinburgh

Hutchinson was born in Renfrew, the son of Rev. John B. A. Hutchinson (d.1926) of the United Presbyterian Church of Scotland on Paisley Road in Renfrew. In 1877 the family moved to Leith on the east coast of Scotland where he was minister of the Bonnington United Free Church.

George was educated at Edinburgh Academy and the University of Edinburgh, and was called to the Scottish bar in 1896. He first stood for Parliament at the December 1910 general election in Argyll, a marginal seat where he lost by 257 votes (3.0%).

In 1906 he sold his house, Afton Lodge, to the church and it was demolished to create Holy Cross Academy (a training school for Roman Catholic teachers) then demolished in turn to create Holy Cross RC Primary School. Hutchison moved to a large West End townhouse at 34 Drumsheugh Gardens.

He did not stand again until the 1922 general election, when he held the Midlothian and Peebles Northern seat after the sitting Unionist MP had retired. He was defeated at the 1923 general election by the Labour Party candidate Andrew Clarke, but won again at the 1924 general election.

He was knighted in the 1928 Birthday Honours, for political and public services, but because of declining health did not stand in the 1929 general election.

He died on 22 December 1928 in Edinburgh, aged 55. He is buried in the northern (independent) extension to Dean Cemetery on Queensferry Road. The grave lies on one of the central east–west paths, towards the eastern side.

== Family ==
He was married to Peggie Blair (1876–1960). Their son Ronald Blair Clark Hutchison was a Commander in the Royal Navy. Their sons Ian Clark Hutchison and Michael Clark Hutchison were also MPs.

Parliament of the United Kingdom
Preceded by Sir John Hope	Member of Parliament for Midlothian & Peebles Northern; 1922 – 1923	Succeeded by Andrew Clarke
Preceded by Andrew Clarke	Member of Parliament for Midlothian & Peebles Northern; 1924 – 1928	Succeeded by Andrew Clarke
