= Carl Raymond Davis =

South African-born American-British pilot and flying ace

- Carl Raymond Davis c. 1939
- Born: 30 July 1911; Krugersdorp, Transvaal, South Africa
- Died: 6 September 1940 (aged 29) near Tunbridge Wells, England
- Burial place: St Mary's churchyard, Storrington, Sussex
- Relatives: Carl Raymond Davis Sr (father); Clara May Davis (mother)
- Military career
- Allegiance: United Kingdom
- Branch: Royal Air Force
- Service years: 1936–1940
- Rank: Flight Lieutenant
- Service number: 90131
- Unit: No. 601 Squadron RAF
- Conflicts: Second World War: Battle of Britain
- Awards: Distinguished Flying Cross

Carl Raymond Davis, DFC (30 July 1911 – 6 September 1940) was a South African-born American-British pilot and flying ace of the Battle of Britain. He claimed nine enemy aircraft (and one shared) destroyed, four (and one shared) probably destroyed, and four damaged, before he was himself shot down and killed in action.

Davis was one of 11 American pilots who flew with RAF Fighter Command between 10 July and 31 October 1940, thereby qualifying for the Battle of Britain clasp to the 1939–45 campaign star.

== Early years ==
Born in Krugersdorp, Transvaal in South Africa to American parents, Davis was educated in England at Sherborne School, and Trinity College, Cambridge (Bachelor of Arts) and at McGill University, Montreal (Bachelor of Arts qualifying as a mining engineer). He became a British citizen in 1932. His wife was Katharine Anne Hope, sister of Sir Archibald Philip Hope, 17th Baronet, of No. 601 Squadron (Hope was in turn married to Carl's sister Ruth.) After obtaining his mining degree, Davis took flying lessons in New Jersey while living with his sister.

Returning to the United Kingdom in 1935, Davis then lived in London and joined No. 601 Squadron, Auxiliary Air Force at Hendon, being commissioned in August 1936.

== Second World War ==
Davis was called to full-time service on 27 August 1939 and, on 27 November, flew one of the six No. 601 Squadron Blenheims that attacked the German seaplane base at Borkum. On 11 July 1940, he shot down a Messerschmitt Bf 110, and he added two more Bf 110s on 11 August 1940 and three more Bf 110s on the 13th. Davis was awarded the Distinguished Flying Cross on 30 August. His citation read:

Flying Officer Carl Raymond Davis (90131), Auxiliary Air Force. Flying Officer Davis has been engaged on operational flying since 3rd September, 1939. He has taken part in nearly all patrols and interceptions carried out by his squadron. He has been a section leader for the last two months, and on several occasions has led his flight. Flying Officer Davis has personally destroyed six enemy aircraft, and severely damaged several others. He has shown great keenness and courage.

=== Death ===
Davis downed five more aircraft before being killed in action when a Messerschmitt Bf 109 shot down his Hawker Hurricane I (P3363) in combat over Tunbridge Wells at 09:30 hrs, 6 September 1940. Davis crashed, inverted, with his aircraft burned out in the back garden of Canterbury Cottage at Matfield, Brenchley, near Tunbridge Wells. He was 29 years old.

== Remembrance ==
2464 (Storrington) Squadron of the Air Training Corps observe an annual act of Remembrance to Flt Lt Davis along with the laying of a wreath at his grave in the churchyard at St Mary's, Storrington.

This service is held immediately following the Church's Battle of Britain service each year.

== See also ==
- List of RAF aircrew in the Battle of Britain
- Non-British personnel in the RAF during the Battle of Britain § United States
- The Few § Leading aces – List of flying aces in the Battle of Britain
