= Dudley McCorkell =

Northern Irish mayor (1883–1960)

Sir Dudley Evelyn Bruce McCorkell, MBE, KStJ, JP, DL, (22 February 1883 – 30 May 1960) was a Mayor of Derry (1929–35), Lord Lieutenant of County Londonderry (1957–60) and ex officio member of the Senate of Northern Ireland.

== Career ==
McCorkell was educated at Shrewsbury School and Pembroke College, Cambridge, where he won a blue for hockey; playing for two seasons. At the outbreak of World War I, McCorkell offered himself for active service but his offer was declined on medical grounds. He devoted his time to the British Red Cross Society and the Order of St. John where he served as Director for Derry and County Donegal during the war. In 1918, he was invested as an MBE for his work during the war. He was a Knight of Justice of the Order of St. John. In 1917 he was made a Justice of the Peace of the County, he was High Sheriff of County Londonderry from 1925–26 and was appointed a Deputy Lieutenant for County Londonderry in 1926.

Like his grandfather, Bartholomew McCorkell JP, he was elected as Mayor of Derry from 1929 and served in that capacity until 1934. He also served as an ex officio member of the Senate of Northern Ireland and in that capacity he attended the Ottawa Conference on Trade in 1932. He was Knighted in 1933. McCorkell, along with his nephew Colonel Sir Michael McCorkell who succeeded him, served as Harbour Board Commissioners and as Chairmen of Wm. McCorkell, who operated the McCorkell Line.

He was appointed Vice Lieutenant of County Londonderry in 1953 and from 1957, until his death, McCorkell served as Her Majesty's Lord Lieutenant of County Londonderry. Sir Dudley was also the first President of the Derry Horticultural Society.

== Derry City F.C. ==
He was chairman of Derry City F.C.

== Amelia Earhart ==
While McCorkell was Mayor of Derry, Amelia Earhart completed her first solo transatlantic flight when she landed in Ballyarnett, County Londonderry. As Mayor and the landowner, McCorkell welcomed Earhart after her successful flight.

== Family ==
The McCorkell family, originally from Scotland, are from the Clan McCorquodale and are a sept of Clan Gunn. McCorkell's great grandfather William McCorkell set up the McCorkell Line in 1778; the family shipping business. McCorkell was a descendant of The Earls of Longford and King Edward III. McCorkell, who was knighted in 1933, was married to Helen Elizabeth Usher; the couple had one son and three daughters.

His son Lt. Francis Dudley Pakenham McCorkell served in the 2nd Battalion Irish Guards during World War II and was killed in action on the 6 August 1944 at the age of 21. He is buried in the St. Charles de Percy War Cemetery in Normandy. Colonel Sir Michael McCorkell was his nephew. McCorkell lived in the family home at Ballyarnett, County Londonderry.

Civic offices
Preceded by James Hamilton	Mayor of Derry; 1929–1935	Succeeded by James McElmunn Wilton
Honorary titles
Preceded by Ralph Beresford	High Sheriff of County Londonderry; 1925	Succeeded by George Gilliland
Preceded by William Lowry Lenox-Conyngham	Lord Lieutenant of County Londonderry; 1957–1960	Succeeded by Sir Henry Mulholland, Bt
