= Lord Lieutenant of County Londonderry =

Ceremonial officer in Londonderry, Northern Ireland

There were lieutenants of counties in Ireland until the reign of James II, when they were renamed governors. The office of Lord Lieutenant was recreated on 23 August 1831.

People who have been Lord Lieutenant of County Londonderry include:

== Governors ==
- John Skeffington, Viscount Massareene: 1678-
- Henry Conyngham, 1st Earl Conyngham: –1781
- Thomas Conolly: 1761–1795
- Edward Cary: 1789–1794
- Robert Stewart, Viscount Castlereagh: 1805–1822
- Charles Vane, 3rd Marquess of Londonderry:1822–1831

== Lord Lieutenants ==
- George Canning, 1st Baron Garvagh: 7 October 1831 – 20 August 1840
- Sir Robert Ferguson, 2nd Baronet: 1840 – 13 March 1860
- Acheson Lyle: 10 April 1860 – 22 April 1870
- Robert Peel Dawson: 25 June 1870 – 2 September 1877
- Sir Henry Bruce, 3rd Baronet: 1877 – 8 December 1907
- John Cooke: 24 January 1908 – December 1910
- David Cleghorn Hogg: 7 January 1911 – 22 August 1914
- James Jackson Clark: 31 March 1915 – 1926
- Maurice Marcus McCausland: 30 October 1926 – 14 January 1938
- Sir Charles Stronge, 7th Baronet: 28 June 1938 – 5 December 1939
- William Lowry Lenox-Conyngham: 2 February 1940 – 5 June 1957
- Sir Dudley McCorkell: 10 October 1957 – 30 May 1960
- Sir Henry Mulholland, 1st Baronet: 17 October 1960 – 1965
- John Cherry Drennan: 1965 - 1974
- Colonel Sir Michael McCorkell: 13 June 1975 – 2000
- Sir Denis Desmond: 14 June 2000 – 11 May 2018
- Helen Rosemary Alison Millar: 12 June 2018 – present

== Deputy lieutenants ==
A deputy lieutenant of County Londonderry is commissioned by the Lord Lieutenant of County Londonderry. Deputy lieutenants support the work of the lord-lieutenant. There can be several deputy lieutenants at any time, depending on the population of the county. Their appointment does not terminate with the changing of the lord-lieutenant, but they usually retire at age 75.

=== 21st Century ===
- 29 October 2015: Helen Mark

== See also ==
- Lord Lieutenant of the City of Londonderry
