= Midlothian and Peebles Northern =

Parliamentary constituency in the United Kingdom, 1918–1950

- Former county constituency for the House of Commons

1918–1950
- Seats: one
- Created from: Midlothian
- Replaced by: Midlothian and Peebles and Edinburgh Pentlands

Midlothian and Peebles Northern was a county constituency represented in the House of Commons of the Parliament of the United Kingdom from 1918 until 1950. Along with Peebles and Southern, it was formed by dividing the old Midlothian constituency.

== Boundaries ==
From 1918 the constituency consisted of "The Calder and Suburban County Districts, the burgh of Dalkeith, and that part of the Lasswade County District which is included in the extra-burghal portions of the parishes of Dalkeith and Inveresk."

== Members of Parliament ==
Election	Member	Party
1918	Sir John Hope	Unionist
1922	George Hutchison	Unionist
1923	Andrew Clarke	Labour
1924	Sir George Hutchison	Unionist
1929 by-election	Andrew Clarke	Labour
1929	John Colville	Unionist
1943 by-election	Sir David King Murray	Unionist
1945	Lord John Hope	Conservative
1950	constituency abolished	

== Election results ==
=== Elections in the 1910s ===
General election 1918: Midlothian and Peebles Northern
Party		Candidate	Votes	%	±%
C	Unionist	John Hope	7,762	62.1	
	Independent	John Brownlie Cadzow	4,737	37.9	
Majority			3,025	24.2	
Turnout			12,499	49.4	
Registered electors			25,291		
	Unionist win (new seat)				
C indicates candidate endorsed by the coalition government.

=== Elections in the 1920s ===
General election 1922: Midlothian and Peebles Northern
Party	Candidate	Votes	%	±%
Unionist	George Hutchison	7,416	40.9	−21.2
Labour	Andrew Clarke	6,942	38.3	New
Liberal	Edward Rolland McNab	3,770	20.8	New
Majority		474	2.6	−21.6
Turnout		18,128	72.7	+23.3
Registered electors		24,939		
Unionist hold		Swing		

General election 1923: Midlothian and Peebles Northern
Party	Candidate	Votes	%	±%
Labour	Andrew Clarke	8,570	45.3	+7.0
Unionist	George Hutchison	6,731	35.7	−5.2
Liberal	Charles de Bois Murray	3,578	19.0	−1.8
Majority		1,839	9.6	N/A
Turnout		18,879	74.7	+2.0
Registered electors		25,278		
Labour gain from Unionist		Swing	+6.1	

General election 1924: Midlothian and Peebles Northern
Party	Candidate	Votes	%	±%
Unionist	George Hutchison	11,320	55.2	+19.5
Labour	Andrew Clarke	9,173	44.8	−0.5
Majority		2,147	10.4	N/A
Turnout		20,493	79.2	+4.5
Registered electors		25,889		
Unionist gain from Labour		Swing	+10.0	

1929 Midlothian and Peebles Northern by-election
Party	Candidate	Votes	%	±%
Labour	Andrew Clarke	7,917	42.0	−2.8
Unionist	John Colville	6,965	36.9	−18.3
Liberal	David Edwin Keir	3,130	16.6	New
National (Scotland)	Lewis Spence	842	4.5	New
Majority		952	5.1	N/A
Turnout		18,854	66.0	−13.2
Registered electors		28,586		
Labour gain from Unionist		Swing	+7.8	

General election 1929: Midlothian and Peebles Northern
Party	Candidate	Votes	%	±%
Unionist	John Colville	11,219	39.1	−16.1
Labour	Andrew Clarke	10,779	37.5	−7.3
Liberal	David Edwin Keir	6,726	23.4	N/A
Majority		440	1.6	−8.8
Turnout		28,724	78.8	−0.4
Registered electors		36,471		
Unionist hold		Swing	−4.4	

=== Elections in the 1930s ===
General election 1931: Midlothian and Peebles Northern
Party	Candidate	Votes	%	±%
Unionist	John Colville	22,211	72.3	+33.2
Labour	Andrew Clarke	8,501	27.7	−9.8
Majority		13,710	44.6	+43.0
Turnout		30,712	78.2	−0.6
Unionist hold		Swing		

General election 1935: Midlothian and Peebles Northern
Party	Candidate	Votes	%	±%
Unionist	John Colville	23,711	62.9	−9.4
Labour	James Lean	13,970	37.1	+9.4
Majority		9,741	25.85	−18.8
Turnout		37,681	74.3	−3.9
Unionist hold		Swing		

=== Elections in the 1940s ===
1943 Midlothian and Peebles Northern by-election
Party	Candidate	Votes	%	±%
Unionist	David Murray	11,620	51.9	−11.0
Common Wealth	Tom Wintringham	10,751	48.1	New
Majority		869	3.8	−22.0
Turnout		22,371	34.6	−39.7
Unionist hold		Swing	−11.0	

General election 1945: Midlothian and Peebles Northern
Party	Candidate	Votes	%	±%
Unionist	John Hope	24,834	47.95	
Labour	James Lean	23,657	45.68	
Common Wealth	Kitty Wintringham	3,299	6.37	N/A
Majority		1,177	2.27	
Turnout		51,790	70.33	
Unionist hold		Swing		
