= List of Great Britain and UK Parliament constituencies in Scotland from 1707 =

Scotland became part of the Kingdom of Great Britain under the Acts of Union 1707 from 1 May 1707. It became part of the United Kingdom from 1 January 1801.

Under the terms of the Act of Union 1707, Scotland was entitled to 45 members of the House of Commons of the Westminster Parliament.

A Scottish law passed before the Union defined the constituencies for elections to the Parliament of Great Britain. There was a special provision for the selection of Members of Parliament for the 1st Parliament of Great Britain.

In 1707, members of the former Parliament of Scotland were co-opted to serve in the 1st Parliament of Great Britain. See Scottish representatives to the 1st Parliament of Great Britain, for details.

== Summary of constituencies and Members of Parliament ==
Key to categories: BC – Burgh constituencies, CC – County constituencies, UC – University constituencies, Total C – Total constituencies, BMP – Burgh Members of Parliament, CMP – County Members of Parliament, UMP – University Members of Parliament.

Period	BC	CC	UC	Total C	BMP	CMP	UMP	Total MPs
1707–1708	0	0	0	1	0	0	0	45
1708–1832	15	30	0	45	15	30	0	45
1832–1868	21	30	0	51	23	30	0	53
1868–1885	22	32	2	56	26	32	2	60
1885–1918	30	39	2	71	31	39	2	72
1918–1950	32	38	1	71	33	38	3	74
1950–1974	32	39	0	71	32	39	0	71
1974–1983	29	42	0	71	29	42	0	71
1983–1997	29	43	0	72	29	43	0	72
1997–2005	28	44	0	72	28	44	0	72
2005–current	19	40	0	59	19	40	0	59

== Constituencies in Scotland from 1707 ==
Notes:

1. Compass point and similar names for Divisions of counties often officially precede the name of the county (Central Aberdeenshire). This list uses the Burgh equivalent form (Aberdeenshire Central), for the first area included in the constituency name. This does not apply to areas where the county name is e.g. East Lothian, or the town name is e.g. East Kilbride.
2. The County etc. column includes the historic/administrative county or local government region in which a constituency was included when it was created. Local government boundaries used for a redistribution were sometimes obsolete by the time the new constituencies were first used. Official names of counties did sometimes change (e.g. Edinburghshire and Midlothian). Constituencies created in 2005 have no local area mentioned. A constituency covering more than one such area has the predominant area (or for Districts of Burghs the county of the first named Burgh) recorded.

Constituency	County etc.	Created	Abolished	Notes
Aberdeen BC	Aberdeenshire	1832	1885	
Aberdeen Burghs BC	Aberdeenshire	1708	1832	District
Aberdeen Central BC	Grampian	1997	2005	
Aberdeen North BC	Aberdeenshire	1885	Current	
Aberdeen South BC	Aberdeenshire	1885	Current	
Aberdeenshire CC	Aberdeenshire	1708	1868	
Aberdeenshire Central CC	Aberdeenshire	1918	1950	
Aberdeenshire East CC	Aberdeenshire	1950	1983	
Aberdeenshire Eastern CC	Aberdeenshire	1868	1950	
Aberdeenshire West CC	Aberdeenshire	1950	1983	
Aberdeenshire West & Kincardine CC	Grampian	1997	Current	
Aberdeenshire Western CC	Aberdeenshire	1868	1918	
Airdrie & Shotts BC	Central S.	1997	Current	
Angus CC	North East S.	1997	Current	
Angus East CC	Tayside	1983	1997	
Angus North & Mearns CC	Angus	1950	1983	
Angus South CC	Angus	1950	1983	
Anstruther Easter Burghs BC	Fife	1708	1832	District
Argyll CC	Argyllshire	1950	1983	
Argyll & Bute CC	Strathclyde	1983	Current	
Argyllshire CC	Argyllshire	1708	1950	
Ayr CC	Ayrshire	1974	2005	
Ayr Burghs BC	Ayrshire	1708	1950	District
Ayr Carrick & Cumnock CC	Scotland	2005	Current	
Ayrshire CC	Ayrshire	1708	1868	
Ayrshire Ayr CC	Ayrshire	1950	1974	
Ayrshire Central (1) CC	Ayrshire	1950	1983	
Ayrshire Central (2) CC	Scotland	2005	Current	
Ayrshire Kilmarnock CC	Ayrshire	1918	1974	
Ayrshire North & Arran (2) CC	Scotland	2005	Current	
Ayrshire Northern CC	Ayrshire	1868	1918	
Ayrshire South CC	Ayrshire	1918	1983	
Ayrshire Southern CC	Ayrshire	1868	1918	
Banff CC	Banffshire	1885	1983	
Banff & Buchan CC	Grampian	1983	Current	
Banffshire CC	Banffshire	1708	1885	
Berwick CC	Berwickshire	1885	1918	
Berwick & East Lothian CC	Berwickshire	1950	1983	
Berwick & Haddington CC	Berwickshire	1918	1950	
Berwickshire CC	Berwickshire	1708	1885	
Berwickshire Roxburgh & SelkirkCC	Scotland	2005	Current	
Bothwell CC	Lanarkshire	1974	1983	
Bute CC	Buteshire	1708	1918	Alternated with Caithness until 1832
Bute & North Ayrshire CC	Buteshire	1950	1983	
Bute & Northern Ayrshire CC	Buteshire	1918	1950	
Caithness CC	Caithness	1708	1918	Alternated with Buteshire until 1832
Caithness and Sutherland CC	Caithness	1918	1997	
Caithness Sutherland & Easter Ross CC	Highland	1997	Current	
Carrick Cumnock & Doon Valley CC	Strathclyde	1983	2005	
Clackmannan CC	Central	1983	1997	
Clackmannan & Kinross CC	Clackmannanshire	1885	1918	
Clackmannan & East Stirlingshire CC	Stirlingshire	1950	1983	
Clackmannan & Eastern Stirlingshire CC	Stirlingshire	1918	1950	
Clackmannanshire CC	Clackmannanshire	1708	1832	Alternated with Kinross-shire
Clackmannanshire & Kinross-shire CC	Clackmannanshire	1832	1885	
Clydebank & Milngavie CC	Strathclyde	1983	2005	
Clydesdale CC	Strathclyde	1983	2005	
Coatbridge & Airdrie BC	Lanarkshire	1950	1983	
Coatbridge & Chryston BC	Strathclyde	1997	2005	
Coatbridge Chryston & Bellshill BC	Scotland	2005	Current	
Combined Scottish Universities UC	Universities	1918	1950	3 MPs
Cromartyshire CC	Cromartyshire	1708	1832	Alternated with Nairnshire
Cumbernauld & Kilsyth CC	Strathclyde	1983	2005	
Cumbernauld Kilsyth & Kirkintilloch East CC	Scotland	2005	Current	
Cunninghame North CC	Strathclyde	1983	2005	
Cunninghame South CC	Strathclyde	1983	2005	
Dumbarton CC	Strathclyde	1983	2005	
Dumbarton Burghs BC	Dunbartonshire	1918	1950	District
Dumfries & Galloway CC	Scotland	2005	Current	
Dumfries Burghs BC	Dumfriesshire	1708	1918	District
Dumfries County CC	Dumfriesshire	1885	2005	
Dumfriesshire CC	Dumfriesshire	1708	1885	
Dumfriesshire Clydesdale & Tweeddale CC	Scotland	2005	Current	
Dunbarton CC	Dunbartonshire	1885	1950	
Dunbartonshire CC	Dunbartonshire	1708	1885	
Dunbartonshire Central CC	Dunbartonshire	1974	1983	
Dunbartonshire East (1) CC	Dunbartonshire	1950	1983	
Dunbartonshire East (2) CC	Scotland	2005	Current	
Dunbartonshire West (1) CC	Dunbartonshire	1950	1983	
Dunbartonshire West (2) CC	Scotland	2005	Current	
Dundee BC	Forfarshire	1832	1950	2 MPs 1868–1950
Dundee East BC	Forfarshire	1950	Current	
Dundee West BC	Forfarshire	1950	Current	
Dunfermline CC	Fife	1974	1983	
Dunfermline & West Fife CC	Scotland	2005	Current	
Dunfermline Burghs BC	Fife	1918	1950	District
Dunfermline East CC	Fife	1983	2005	
Dunfermline West CC	Fife	1983	2005	
Dysart Burghs BC	Fife	1708	1832	District
East Kilbride CC	Lanarkshire	1974	2005	
East Kilbride Strathaven & Lesmahagow CC	Scotland	2005	Current	
East Lothian CC	Lothian	1974	Current	
Eastwood CC	Strathclyde	1983	2005	
Edinburgh BC	Edinburghshire	1708	1885	2 MPs 1832–1885
Edinburgh and St Andrews Universities UC	Universities	1868	1918	
Edinburgh Central BC	Edinburghshire	1885	2005	
Edinburgh East (1) BC	Edinburghshire	1885	1997	
Edinburgh East (2) BC	Scotland	2005	Current	
Edinburgh East & Musselburgh BC	Lothian	1997	2005	
Edinburgh Leith BC	Midlothian	1950	1997	
Edinburgh North BC	Midlothian	1918	1983	
Edinburgh North & Leith BC	Lothian	1997	Current	
Edinburgh Pentlands BC	Midlothian	1950	2005	
Edinburgh South BC	Edinburghshire	1885	Current	
Edinburgh South West BC	Scotland	2005	Current	
Edinburgh West BC	Edinburghshire	1885	Current	
Edinburghshire CC	Edinburghshire	1708	1918	
Elgin & Nairn CC	Elginshire	1885	1918	
Elgin Burghs BC	Elginshire	1708	1918	District
Elginshire CC	Elginshire	1708	1832	
Elginshire & Nairnshire CC	Elginshire	1832	1885	
Falkirk CC	Scotland	2005	Current	
Falkirk Burghs BC	Stirlingshire	1832	1918	District
Falkirk East CC	Central	1983	2005	
Falkirk West CC	Central	1983	2005	
Fife CC	Fife	1708	1885	
Fife Central CC	Fife	1974	2005	
Fife East CC	Fife	1950	1983	
Fife Eastern CC	Fife	1885	1950	
Fife North East CC	Fife	1983	Current	
Fife West CC	Fife	1950	1974	
Fife Western CC	Fife	1885	1950	
Forfar CC	Forfarshire	1885	1950	
Forfarshire CC	Forfarshire	1708	1885	
Galloway CC	Kirkcudbrightshire	1918	1983	
Galloway & Upper Nithsdale CC	Kirkcudbrightshire	1983	2005	
Glasgow BC	Lanarkshire	1832	1885	2 MPs 1832–1868, 3 MPs 1868–85
Glasgow & Aberdeen Universities UC	Universities	1868	1918	
Glasgow Burghs BC	Lanarkshire	1708	1832	District
Glasgow Anniesland BC	Strathclyde	1997	2005	
Glasgow Baillieston BC	Strathclyde	1997	2005	
Glasgow Blackfriars & Hutchesontown BC	Lanarkshire	1885	1918	
Glasgow Bridgeton BC	Lanarkshire	1885	1974	
Glasgow Camlachie BC	Lanarkshire	1885	1955	
Glasgow Cathcart BC	Lanarkshire	1918	2005	
Glasgow Central (1) BC	Lanarkshire	1885	1997	
Glasgow Central (2) BC	Scotland	2005	Current	
Glasgow College BC	Lanarkshire	1885	1918	
Glasgow Craigton BC	Lanarkshire	1955	1983	
Glasgow East BC	Scotland	2005	Current	
Glasgow Garscadden BC	Lanarkshire	1974	1997	
Glasgow Gorbals BC	Lanarkshire	1918	1974	
Glasgow Govan BC	Lanarkshire	1918	2005	
Glasgow Hillhead BC	Lanarkshire	1918	1997	
Glasgow Kelvingrove BC	Lanarkshire	1918	1983	
Glasgow Maryhill BC	Lanarkshire	1918	2005	
Glasgow North BC	Scotland	2005	Current	
Glasgow North East BC	Scotland	2005	Current	
Glasgow North West BC	Scotland	2005	Current	
Glasgow Partick BC	Lanarkshire	1918	1950	
Glasgow Pollok BC	Lanarkshire	1918	2005	
Glasgow Provan BC	Lanarkshire	1955	1997	
Glasgow Queen's Park BC	Lanarkshire	1974	1983	
Glasgow Rutherglen BC	Strathclyde	1983	2005	
Glasgow Scotstoun BC	Lanarkshire	1950	1974	
Glasgow Shettleston BC	Lanarkshire	1918	2005	
Glasgow South West BC	Scotland	2005	Current	
Glasgow Springburn BC	Lanarkshire	1918	2005	
Glasgow St Rollox BC	Lanarkshire	1885	1950	
Glasgow Tradeston BC	Lanarkshire	1885	1955	
Glasgow Woodside BC	Lanarkshire	1950	1974	
Glenrothes CC	Scotland	2005	Current	
Gordon CC	Grampian	1983	Current	
Greenock BC	Renfrewshire	1832	1974	
Greenock & Inverclyde CC	Strathclyde	1997	2005	
Greenock & Port Glasgow CC	Renfrewshire	1974	1997	
Haddington CC	Haddingtonshire	1885	1918	
Haddington Burghs BC	Haddingtonshire	1708	1885	District
Haddingtonshire CC	Haddingtonshire	1708	1885	
Hamilton CC	Lanarkshire	1974	1997	
Hamilton North & Bellshill CC	Strathclyde	1997	2005	
Hamilton South CC	Strathclyde	1997	2005	
Hawick Burghs BC	Roxburghshire	1868	1918	District
Inverclyde CC	Scotland	2005	Current	
Inverness CC	Inverness-shire	1918	1983	
Inverness Burghs BC	Inverness-shire	1708	1918	District
Inverness County CC	Inverness-shire	1885	1918	
Inverness East Nairn & Lochaber CC	Highland	1997	2005	
Inverness Nairn & Lochaber CC	Highland	1983	1997	
Inverness Nairn Badenoch & Strathspey CC	Scotland	2005	Current	
Inverness-shire CC	Inverness-shire	1708	1885	
Kilmarnock CC	Ayrshire	1974	1983	
Kilmarnock & Loudoun CC	Strathclyde	1983	Current	
Kilmarnock Burghs BC	Ayrshire	1832	1918	District
Kincardine CC	Kincardineshire	1885	1918	
Kincardine & Deeside CC	Grampian	1983	1997	
Kincardine & Western Aberdeenshire CC	Aberdeenshire	1918	1950	
Kincardineshire CC	Kincardineshire	1708	1885	
Kinross & Western Perthshire CC	Perthshire	1918	1950	
Kinross & West Perthshire CC	Perthshire	1950	1983	
Kinross-shire CC	Kinross-shire	1708	1832	Alternated with Clackmannanshire
Kirkcaldy CC	Fife	1974	2005	
Kirkcaldy & Cowdenbeath CC	Scotland	2005	Current	
Kirkcaldy Burghs BC	Fife	1832	1950	District
Kirkcudbright CC	Kirkcudbrightshire	1885	1918	
Kirkcudbrightshire CC	Kirkcudbrightshire	1708	1885	
Lanark CC	Lanarkshire	1974	1983	
Lanark & Hamilton East CC	Scotland	2005	Current	
Lanarkshire CC	Lanarkshire	1708	1868	
Lanarkshire Bothwell CC	Lanarkshire	1918	1974	
Lanarkshire Coatbridge CC	Lanarkshire	1918	1950	
Lanarkshire Govan CC	Lanarkshire	1885	1918	
Lanarkshire Hamilton CC	Lanarkshire	1918	1974	
Lanarkshire Lanark CC	Lanarkshire	1918	1974	
Lanarkshire Mid CC	Lanarkshire	1885	1918	
Lanarkshire Motherwell CC	Lanarkshire	1918	1974	
Lanarkshire North CC	Lanarkshire	1950	1983	
Lanarkshire North-Eastern CC	Lanarkshire	1885	1918	
Lanarkshire North-Western CC	Lanarkshire	1885	1918	
Lanarkshire Northern (1) CC	Lanarkshire	1868	1885	
Lanarkshire Northern (2) CC	Lanarkshire	1918	1950	
Lanarkshire Partick CC	Lanarkshire	1885	1918	
Lanarkshire Rutherglen CC	Lanarkshire	1918	1974	
Lanarkshire Southern CC	Lanarkshire	1868	1918	
Leith BC	Midlothian	1918	1950	
Leith Burghs BC	Edinburghshire	1832	1918	District
Linlithgow (1) CC	Linlithgowshire	1885	1950	
Linlithgow (2) CC	Lothian	1983	2005	
Linlithgow & East Falkirk CC	Scotland	2005	Current	
Linlithgow Burghs BC	Linlithgowshire	1708	1832	District
Linlithgowshire CC	Linlithgowshire	1708	1885	
Livingston CC	Lothian	1983	Current	
Midlothian CC	Midlothian	1955	Current	
Midlothian & Peebles CC	Midlothian	1950	1955	
Midlothian Northern CC	Midlothian	1918	1950	
Monklands East BC	Strathclyde	1983	1997	
Monklands West BC	Strathclyde	1983	1997	
Montrose Burghs BC	Forfarshire	1832	1950	District
Moray CC	Grampian	1983	Current	
Moray & Nairn CC	Elginshire	1918	1983	
Motherwell & Wishaw (1) BC	Lanarkshire	1974	1983	
Motherwell & Wishaw (2) BC	Strathclyde	1997	Current	
Motherwell North BC	Strathclyde	1983	1997	
Motherwell South BC	Strathclyde	1983	1997	
Na h-Eileanan An Iar CC	Scotland	2005	Current	
Nairnshire CC	Nairnshire	1708	1832	Alternated with Cromartyshire
Ochil CC	Central	1997	2005	
Ochil & South Perthshire CC	Scotland	2005	Current	
Orkney & Shetland CC	Orkney	1708	Current	
Paisley BC	Renfrewshire	1832	1983	
Paisley & Renfrewshire North CC	Scotland	2005	Current	
Paisley & Renfrewshire South CC	Scotland	2005	Current	
Paisley North BC	Strathclyde	1983	2005	
Paisley South BC	Strathclyde	1983	2005	
Peebles & Southern Midlothian CC	Midlothian	1918	1950	
Peebles & Selkirk CC	Peeblesshire	1885	1918	
Peeblesshire CC	Peeblesshire	1708	1868	
Peeblesshire & Selkirkshire CC	Peeblesshire	1868	1885	
Perth (1) BC	Perthshire	1832	1918	
Perth (2) CC	Central	1997	2005	
Perth & Kinross CC	Tayside	1983	1997	
Perth & East Perthshire CC	Perthshire	1950	1979	
Perth & North Perthshire CC	Scotland	2005	Current	
Perth Burghs BC	Perthshire	1708	1832	District
Perthshire CC	Perthshire	1708	1885	
Perthshire Eastern CC	Perthshire	1885	1918	
Perthshire Perth CC	Perthshire	1918	1950	
Perthshire Western CC	Perthshire	1885	1918	
Renfrew West & Inverclyde CC	Strathclyde	1983	1997	
Renfrewshire CC	Renfrewshire	1708	1885	
Renfrewshire East (1) CC	Renfrewshire	1950	1983	
Renfrewshire East (2) CC	Scotland	2005	Current	
Renfrewshire Eastern CC	Renfrewshire	1885	1950	
Renfrewshire West (1) CC	Renfrewshire	1950	1983	
Renfrewshire West (2) CC	Strathclyde	1997	2005	
Renfrewshire Western CC	Renfrewshire	1885	1950	
Ross & Cromarty CC	Ross-shire	1832	1983	
Ross Cromarty & Skye CC	Highland	1983	1997	
Ross Skye & Lochaber CC	Scotland	2005	Current	
Ross Skye & Inverness West CC	Highland	1997	2005	
Ross-shire CC	Ross-shire	1708	1832	
Roxburgh CC	Roxburghshire	1885	1918	
Roxburgh & Berwickshire CC	Borders	1983	2005	
Roxburgh & Selkirk CC	Roxburghshire	1918	1955	
Roxburgh Selkirk & Peebles CC	Roxburghshire	1955	1983	
Roxburghshire CC	Roxburghshire	1708	1885	
Rutherglen CC	Lanarkshire	1974	1983	
Rutherglen and Hamilton West CC	Scotland	2005	Current	
Selkirkshire CC	Selkirkshire	1708	1868	
St Andrews Burghs BC	Fife	1832	1918	District
Stirling CC	Central	1983	Current	
Stirling & Falkirk Burghs BC	Stirlingshire	1918	1950	District
Stirling Burghs BC	Stirlingshire	1708	1918	District
Stirling Falkirk & Grangemouth BC	Stirlingshire	1974	1983	
Stirlingshire CC	Stirlingshire	1708	1918	
Stirlingshire West CC	Stirlingshire	1950	1983	
Stirlingshire Western CC	Stirlingshire	1918	1950	
Strathkelvin & Bearsden CC	Strathclyde	1983	2005	
Sutherland CC	Sutherland	1708	1918	
Tain Burghs BC	Ross-shire	1708	1832	District
Tayside North CC	Tayside	1983	2005	
Tweeddale Ettrick & Lauderdale CC	Borders	1983	2005	
West Lothian CC	Linlithgowshire	1950	1983	
Western Isles CC	Inverness-shire	1918	2005	
Wick Burghs BC	Caithness	1832	1918	District
Wigtown CC	Wigtownshire	1885	1918	
Wigtown Burghs BC	Wigtownshire	1708	1885	District
Wigtownshire CC	Wigtownshire	1708	1885	

== Historical representation by party ==
A cell marked → (with a different colour background to the preceding cell) indicates that the previous MP continued to sit under a new party name.

=== Highland ===
Before 1974 comprising the counties of Orkney, Shetland, Caithness, Sutherland, Ross-shire, Cromartyshire and Inverness-shire.

After 1996 comprising the unitary authorities of Highland, Na h-Eileanan Siar (Western Isles), Shetland Islands and Orkney Islands.

==== 1708 to 1832 ====
- Orkney & Shetland
- Caithness (alternated with Bute)
- Sutherland
- Ross-shire
- Tain Burghs
- Cromartyshire (alternated with Nairnshire)
- Inverness-shire
- Inverness Burghs

==== 1832 to 1885 ====
Conservative Tories Whig

Constituency	1832	33	34	1835	35	1837	38	40	1841	1847	1852	1857
Caithness	G. Sinclair								Traill			
Inverness Burghs	J. Baillie	Cumming Bruce	→			Macleod		Morrison		A. Matheson		
Inverness-shire	C. Grant				Chisholm		F. Grant	Baillie				
Orkney & Shetland	Traill			Balfour		Dundas				Anderson	F. Dundas	
Ross & Cromarty	Stewart-Mackenzie					Mackenzie				J. Matheson		
Sutherland	Macleod					Howard		D. Dundas			G. Sutherland-Leveson-Gower	
Wick Burghs	J. Loch										Laing	Hay

==== 1859 to 1885 ====
Conservative Liberal

Constituency	1859	60	61	1865	67	1868	69	72	73	1874	1880	84
Caithness	Traill						J. Sinclair					
Inverness Burghs	A. Matheson					Mackintosh				Fraser-Mackintosh		
Inverness-shire	Baillie					Cameron						
Orkney & Shetland	F. Dundas								Laing			
Ross & Cromarty	J. Matheson					A. Matheson						Munro-Ferguson
Sutherland	G. Sutherland-Leveson-Gower		D. Dundas		Gower					C. Sutherland-Leveson-Gower		
Wick Burghs	Laing	Keppel		Laing		G. Loch		Pender				

==== 1885 to 1918 ====
Conservative Independent Liberal Liberal Liberal Unionist

Constituency	1885	86	1886	1892	94	95	1895	96	1900	02	06	Jan 10	Dec 10	11	17
Caithness	Clark*		→*						Harmsworth						
Inverness Burghs	Finlay	→		Beith			Finlay				Bryce				
Inverness-shire	Fraser-Mackintosh*	→*		MacGregor*		Baillie			Dewar						Morison
Orkney & Shetland	Lyell								Wason	→	→				
Ross & Cromarty	Macdonald*		→*	Weir										Macpherson	
Sutherland	Sutherland-Leveson-Gower		Sutherland		MacLeod*				Leveson-Gower		Morton				
Wick Burghs	Cameron		→	Pender				Hedderwick	Bignold			Munro			

*also the candidate of the Crofters' Party

==== 1918 to 1950 ====
Coalition Liberal (1918–22) / National Liberal (1922–23) Conservative Independent Conservative Independent Liberal Labour Liberal National Labour National Liberal (1931–68)

Constituency	1918	21	22	1922	1923	1924	1929	31	1931	1935	36	42	1945	48
Caithness and Sutherland	Harmsworth			Sinclair	→								Dower	→
Inverness	Morison		Macdonald		→			→				→		
Orkney and Shetland	Wason	Smith		Hamilton						Neven-Spence				
Ross and Cromarty	Macpherson				→			→			MacDonald		MacLeod	
Western Isles	Murray			Cotts	Livingstone		Ramsay	→		Macmillan				

==== 1950 to 1983 ====
Conservative Independent Conservative Independent Liberal (MacLeod, 1950) Labour Liberal National Liberal (1931–68) Scottish National Party (Stewart, 1970) Social Democratic

Constituency	1950	1951	54	1955	1959	1964	1966	1970	Feb 74	Oct 74	1979	81
Caithness and Sutherland	Robertson				→	Mackie	Maclennan					→
Inverness	Douglas-Hamilton		McLean			Johnston						
Orkney and Shetland	Grimond											
Ross and Cromarty	MacLeod	→				Mackenzie		Gray				
Western Isles	Macmillan							Stewart				

==== 1983 to 2005 ====
Labour Liberal Liberal Democrats Scottish National Party Social Democratic

Constituency	1983	1987	88	1992	1997	2001
Caithness & Sutherland / Caithness, Sutherland & Easter Ross ('97)	Maclennan		→			Thurso
Inverness, Nairn & Lochaber / Inverness E, Nairn & Lochaber (1997)	Johnston		→		Stewart	
Orkney and Shetland	Wallace		→			Carmichael
Ross, Cromarty and Skye / Ross, Skye & Inverness W (1997)	Kennedy		→			
Western Isles	Stewart	MacDonald				

==== 2005 to present ====
Independent Labour Liberal Democrats Scottish National Party

Constituency	2005	2010	2015	2017	2019	23	2024
Caithness, Sutherland & Easter Ross	Thurso		Monaghan	Stone			
Inverness, Nairn, Badenoch & Strathspey / Inverness, Skye & W Ross-shire ('24)	Alexander		Hendry				MacDonald
Na h-Eileanan an Iar	MacNeil					→	Crichton
Orkney and Shetland	Carmichael						
Ross, Skye and Lochaber	→		Blackford				N/A

=== Grampian ===
Before 1974 comprising the counties of Elginshire, Nairnshire, Banffshire, Aberdeenshire and Kincardineshire.

After 1996 comprising the unitary authorities of Aberdeenshire, City of Aberdeen and Moray.

==== 1708 to 1832 ====
- Banffshire
- Elginshire
- Elgin Burghs
- Nairnshire (alternated with Cromartyshire)
- Aberdeenshire
- Aberdeen Burghs
- Kincardineshire

==== 1832 to 1885 ====
Conservative Party Independent Liberal Party Tories Whig Party

Constituency	1832	1835	1837	1841	1847	1852	1857	1859	1865	1868	1874	1880
Banffshire	Tory	Conservative	Whig	Whig	Whig	Whig	Whig	Liberal	Liberal	Liberal	Liberal	Liberal
Elgin Burghs	Whig	Whig	Whig	Whig	Whig	Whig	Whig	Liberal	Liberal	Liberal	Liberal	Liberal
Elginshire and Nairnshire	Tory	Conservative	Conservative	Conservative	Conservative	Conservative	Conservative	Conservative	Conservative	Conservative	Liberal	Liberal
Aberdeen	Whig	Whig	Whig	Whig	Whig	Whig	Whig	Liberal	Liberal	Liberal	Liberal	Liberal
Aberdeenshire / East Aberdeenshire (1868)	Tory	Conservative	Conservative	Conservative	Conservative	Conservative	Whig	Liberal	Conservative	Liberal	Liberal	Liberal
West Aberdeenshire										Liberal	Liberal	Liberal
Kincardineshire	Independent	Independent	Independent	Independent	Independent	Independent	Independent	Independent	Liberal	Liberal	Liberal	Liberal

==== 1885 to 1918 ====
Conservative Liberal Liberal Unionist

Constituency	1885	1886	89	92	92	93	95	96	1900	05	1906	06	07	08	Jan 10	Dec 10	17	18
Aberdeen North	Hunter							Pirie										
Aberdeen South	Bryce												Esslemont				Fleming	
Aberdeenshire East	Esslemont				Buchanan				Maconochie		Annand	J. Murray			Cowan			
Aberdeenshire West	Farquharson										Henderson							
Banffshire	Duff					Wedderburn			Black				Waring					
Elgin Burghs	Asher									Sutherland								Barrie
Elginshire & Nairnshire	Macpherson-Grant	Anderson	Keay				Gordon				Williamson							
Kincardineshire	Balfour			Crombie										A. Murray				

==== 1918 to 1983 ====
Coalition Liberal (1918–22) / National Liberal (1922–23) Conservative Labour Liberal

Constituency	1918	19	22	1922	1923	1924	28	1929	1931	35	1935	39	1945	46
Aberdeen North	Rose						Benn		Burnett		Garro-Jones		H. Hughes	
Aberdeen South	F. Thomson									D. Thomson				Buchan
Aberdeen & Kincardine Central	Gordon	Wood				Smith							Spence	
Aberdeen & Kincardine East	Cowan			Martin		Boothby								
Banff	Barrie				→	Templeton		Wood			Findlay		Duthie	
Kincardine & Aberdeenshire West	Murray			→	Barclay-Harvey			Scott	Barclay-Harvey			Thornton-Kemsley		
Moray and Nairn	Williamson		Guthrie		Stuart									

==== 1950 to 1983 ====
Conservative Labour Liberal Scottish National Party

Constituency	1950	1951	1955	58	1959	1964	1966	1970	Feb 74	Oct 74	1979
Aberdeen North	H. Hughes							R. Hughes			
Aberdeen South	Buchan						Dewar	Sproat			
Aberdeenshire East	Boothby			Wolrige-Gordon					Henderson		McQuarrie
Aberdeenshire West	Spence				Hendry		Davidson	Mitchell	Fairgrieve		
Banff	Duthie					Baker			Watt		Myles
Moray and Nairn	Stuart				Campbell				W. Ewing		Pollock

==== 1983 to 2005 ====
Conservative Labour Liberal Liberal Democrats Scottish National Party

Constituency	1983	1987	88	91	1992	1997	2001
Aberdeen Central						Doran	
Aberdeen North	R. Hughes					Savidge	
Aberdeen South	Malone	Doran			Robertson	Begg	
Banff and Buchan	McQuarrie	Salmond					
Gordon	Bruce		→				
Kincardine & Deeside / W Aberdeenshire & Kincardine ('97)	Buchanan-Smith			Stephen	Kynoch	Smith	
Moray	Pollock	M. Ewing					Robertson

==== 2005 to present ====
Conservative Labour Liberal Liberal Democrats Scottish National Party

Constituency	2005	2010	2015	2017	2019	2024	26
Aberdeen North	Doran		Blackman				
Aberdeen South	Begg		McCaig	R. Thomson	Flynn		Lumsden
Aberdeenshire West & Kincardine	Smith		Donaldson	Bowie			
Banff & Buchan / Aberdeenshire N & Moray E ('24)	Salmond	Whiteford		Duguid		Logan	
Gordon / Gordon & Buchan (2024)	Bruce		Salmond	Clark	R. G. Thomson	Cross	
Moray / Moray West, Nairn & Strathspey (2024)	Robertson			Ross		Leadbitter	

=== Central and Tayside ===
Before 1974 comprising the counties of Forfarshire, Perthshire, Clackmannanshire, Kinross-shire and Stirlingshire.

After 1996 comprising the unitary authorities of Falkirk, Perth and Kinross, City of Dundee, Angus, Stirling and Clackmannanshire.

==== 1708 to 1832 ====
- Forfarshire
- Perthshire
- Perth Burghs
- Clackmannanshire and Kinross-shire (alternated)
- Stirlingshire
- Stirling Burghs

==== 1832 to 1885 ====
Conservative Party Independent Liberal Party Peelite Radicals Whig Party

Constituency	1832	1835	1837	1841	1847	1852	1857	1859	1865	1868	1874	1880
Forfarshire	Independent	Independent	Independent	Independent	Independent	Independent	Independent	Independent	Liberal	Liberal	Liberal	Liberal
Montrose Burghs	Independent	Independent	Independent	Independent	Radical	Radical	Whig	Liberal	Liberal	Liberal	Liberal	Liberal
Dundee	Whig	Whig	Whig	Whig	Whig	Whig	Whig	Liberal	Liberal	Liberal	Liberal	Liberal
Dundee										Liberal	Liberal	Liberal
Perth	Whig	Whig	Whig	Whig	Whig	Whig	Whig	Liberal	Liberal	Liberal	Liberal	Liberal
Perthshire	Whig	Whig	Conservative	Peelite	Peelite	Conservative	Conservative	Conservative	Conservative	Liberal	Conservative	Liberal
Clackmannanshire and Kinross-shire	Whig	Whig	Whig	Whig	Whig	Whig	Whig	Liberal	Liberal	Liberal	Liberal	Liberal
Falkirk Burghs	Whig	Whig	Whig	Conservative	Conservative	Conservative	Whig	Liberal	Liberal	Liberal	Liberal	Liberal
Stirling Burghs	Whig	Whig	Whig	Whig	Whig	Independent	Independent	Independent	Independent	Liberal	Liberal	Liberal
Stirlingshire	Independent	Independent	Independent	Independent	Independent	Independent	Independent	Independent	Independent	Independent	Conservative	Liberal

==== 1885 to 1918 ====
Conservative Labour Liberal Liberal Unionist

Constituency	1885	86	1886	88	89	1892	94	1895	96	97	99	1900	03	1906	07	08	09	Jan 1910	Dec 1910	17
Dundee	Lacaita			Firth	Leng									Wilkie						
Dundee	Robertson															Churchill				
Forfarshire	Barclay	→				Rigby	Ramsay	White		Sinclair							Falconer			
Montrose Burghs	Will								Morley							Harcourt				
Perth	Parker					Whitelaw		Wallace							Pullar			Whyte		
Perthshire Eastern	Menzies				Kinloch								Buchanan					Young		
Perthshire Western	Currie	→										Stroyan		Erskine				Stewart-Murray		Stirling
Clackmannanshire & Kinross-shire	Balfour										Wason									
Falkirk Burghs	Ramsay		Sinclair			Smith		Wilson						Macdonald						
Stirling Burghs	Campbell-Bannerman															Ponsonby				
Stirlingshire	Bolton					Jacks		McKillop						Smeaton				Chapple		

==== 1918 to 1950 ====
Coalition Liberal (1918–22) / National Liberal (1922–23) Conservative Independent Independent Liberal Labour Liberal National Liberal (1931–68) Scottish Prohibition

Constituency	1918	1922	1923	1924	24	1929	30	31	1931	32	35	1935	38	38	39	40	1945	48
Dundee	Wilkie	Morel			T. Johnston	Marcus			Foot								Cook	
Dundee	Churchill	Scrymgeour							Horsbrugh								Strachey	
Forfarshire	Shaw	Falconer		Hope					Shaw								Ramsay	
Montrose Burghs	Sturrock		→	Hutchison			→	→		Kerr						Maclay		
Perth	Young	Skelton	Mitchell	Skelton					Murray		Norie-Miller	Hunter					Gomme-Duncan	
Kinross and West Perthshire	Gardiner	→	Stewart-Murray										→	Snadden				
Stirling and Falkirk Burghs	Macdonald	Murnin	McCrae	Murnin					Reid			Westwood						MacPherson
Clackmannan and Eastern Stirlingshire	Glyn	MacNeill Weir							J. Johnston			MacNeill Weir			Woodburn			
Stirlingshire West	Hope	T. Johnston		Fanshawe		T. Johnston			Ker			T. Johnston					Balfour	

==== 1950 to 1983 ====
Conservative Labour National Liberal (1931–68) Scottish National Party

Constituency	1950	1951	52	1955	1959	63	1964	1966	1970	71	73	Feb 1974	Oct 1974	1979
Angus North and Mearns	Thornton-Kemsley						Buchanan-Smith							
Angus South	Duncan						Bruce-Gardyne						Welsh	Fraser
Dundee East	Cook		Thomson								Machin	Wilson		
Dundee West	Strachey					Doig								Ross
Kinross and Perthshire West	Snadden			Leburn		Douglas-Home							Fairbairn	
Perth and Perthshire East	Gomme-Duncan				MacArthur								Crawford	Walker
Stirling & Falkirk / S., F. & Grangemouth ('74)	MacPherson									Ewing				
Stirlingshire East and Clackmannan	Woodburn								Douglas			Reid		O'Neill
Stirlingshire West	Balfour				Baxter								Canavan	

==== 1983 to 2005 ====
Conservative Labour Scottish National Party

Constituency	1983	1987	1992	95	1997	00	2001
Angus East / Angus (1997)	Fraser	Welsh					Weir
Clackmannan / Ochil (1997)	O'Neill						
Dundee East	Wilson	McAllion					Luke
Dundee West	Ross						
Falkirk East	Ewing		Connarty				
Falkirk West	Canavan					Joyce	
Perth and Kinross / Perth (1997)	Fairbairn			Cunningham			Ewing
Stirling	Forsyth				McGuire		
Tayside North	Walker				Swinney		Wishart

==== 2005 to present ====
Conservative Independent Labour Scottish National Party

Constituency	2005	2010	12	2015	2017	2019	2024	26
Angus / Angus & Perthshire Glens (2024)	Weir				Hair	Doogan		
Dundee East / Arbroath & Broughty Ferry (2024)	Hosie						Gethins	Bird
Dundee West / Dundee Central (2024)	McGovern			Law				
Falkirk	Joyce		→	McNally			Stainbank	
Ochil & South Perthshire / Alloa & Grangemouth (2024)	Banks			Ahmed-Sheikh	Graham	Nicolson	Leishman	
Perth & North Perthshire / Perth & Kinross-shire (2024)	Wishart							
Stirling / Stirling & Strathallan (2024)	McGuire			Paterson	Kerr	Smith	Kane	

=== Fife ===
==== 1708 to 1832 ====
- Fife
- Anstruther Easter Burghs
- Dysart Burghs

==== 1832 to 1885 ====
Independent Liberal Whig

Constituency	1832	1835	1837	1841	1847	1852	1857	1859	1865	1868	1874	1880
Fife	Whig	Whig	Whig	Whig	Whig	Whig	Whig	Liberal	Liberal	Liberal	Liberal	Liberal
Kirkcaldy District of Burghs	Independent	Independent	Independent	Independent	Independent	Independent	Independent	Independent	Independent	Independent	Independent	Liberal
St Andrews Burghs	Whig	Whig	Whig	Whig	Whig	Whig	Whig	Liberal	Liberal	Liberal	Liberal	Liberal

==== 1885 to 1918 ====
Conservative Independent Liberal Labour Liberal Liberal Unionist

Constituency	1885	86	1886	89	92	1892	1895	1900	03	1906	Jan 1910	Dec 1910	12
Fife East	Kinnear	→	Asquith										
Fife West	Bruce			Birrell				Hope				Adamson	
Kirkcaldy Burghs	Campbell				Dalziel								
St Andrews Burghs	R. Anstruther		H. Anstruther						Ellice	Anstruther-Gray	Millar	Anstruther-Gray	→

==== 1918 to 1974 ====
Coalition Liberal (1918–22) / National Liberal (1922–23) Communist Conservative Labour Liberal National Liberal (1931–68)

Constituency	1918	21	1922	23	1924	1929	31	31	33	1935	44	45	50	51	55	59	61	64	66	70
Dunfermline Burghs	Wallace		Watson					Wallace		Watson			Clunie			Thompson		Hunter		
Fife East	Sprot		Millar		Cochrane	Millar	→		Henderson-Stewart								Gilmour			
Fife West	Adamson							Milne		Gallacher			Hamilton							
Kirkcaldy Burghs	Dalziel	Kennedy	Hutchison	Kennedy				Russell		Kennedy	Hubbard					Gourlay				

==== 1974 to 2005 ====
Conservative Labour Liberal Democrats Liberal Scottish National Party

Constituency	Feb 1974	Oct 1974	1979	1983	1987	88	90	1992	1997	2001
Dunfermline East				Brown						
Dunfermline / Dunfermline W (1983)	Hunter		Douglas				→	Squire		
Fife Central	Hamilton				McLeish					MacDougall
Kirkcaldy	Gourlay				Moonie					
Fife East / North East Fife (1983)	Gilmour		Henderson		Campbell	→				

==== 2005 to present ====
Alba Independent Labour Liberal Democrats Scottish National Party

Constituency	2005	06	08	2010	2015	2017	2019	19	20	21	2024
Dunfermline & W Fife / Dunfermline & Dollar (2024)	Squire	Rennie		Docherty	Chapman						Downie
Glenrothes / Glenrothes & Mid Fife (2024)	MacDougall		Roy		Grant						Baker
Kirkcaldy & Cowdenbeath / Cowdenbeath & Kirkcaldy ('24)	Brown				Mullin	Laird	Hanvey	→	→	→	Ward
North East Fife	Campbell				Gethins		Chamberlain				

=== Strathclyde ===
Before 1974 comprising the counties of Argyllshire, Buteshire, Dunbartonshire, Renfrewshire, Ayrshire and Lanarkshire.

After 1996 comprising the unitary authorities of City of Glasgow, North Lanarkshire, South Lanarkshire, Renfrewshire, North Ayrshire, East Ayrshire, South Ayrshire, East Dunbartonshire, East Renfrewshire, West Dunbartonshire, Argyll and Bute and Inverclyde.

==== 1708 to 1832 ====
- Argyllshire
- Bute (alternated with Caithness)
- Dunbartonshire
- Renfrewshire
- Ayrshire
- Ayr Burghs
- Lanarkshire
- Glasgow Burghs

==== 1832 to 1885 ====
Constituency	1832	1835	1837	1841	1847	1852	1857	1859	1865	1868	1874	1880
Argyllshire	Whig	Whig	Whig	Conservative	Conservative	Conservative	Whig	Liberal	Liberal	Liberal	Liberal	Liberal
Buteshire	Tory	Conservative	Conservative	Conservative	Conservative	Conservative	Whig	Conservative	Liberal	Conservative	Conservative	Liberal
Dunbartonshire	Whig	Whig	Whig	Conservative	Conservative	Conservative	Conservative	Conservative	Conservative	Conservative	Conservative	Conservative
Greenock	Whig	Whig	Whig	Whig	Whig	Whig	Whig	Liberal	Liberal	Liberal	Liberal	Liberal
Paisley	Independent	Radical	Radical	Radical	Radical	Radical	Radical	Liberal	Liberal	Liberal	Liberal	Liberal
Renfrewshire	Independent	Independent	Conservative	Whig	Conservative	Conservative	Conservative	Conservative	Liberal	Liberal	Liberal	Liberal
Ayr Burghs	Whig	Whig	Whig	Whig	Whig	Radical	Radical	Liberal	Liberal	Liberal	Conservative	Liberal
Kilmarnock Burghs	Whig	Radical	Conservative	Whig	Whig	Whig	Whig	Liberal	Liberal	Liberal	Liberal	Liberal
Ayrshire / North Ayrshire (1868)	Whig	Whig	Whig	Conservative	Conservative	Conservative	Whig	Liberal	Conservative	Liberal	Conservative	Conservative
South Ayrshire										Liberal	Conservative	Conservative
Glasgow 1	Whig	Whig	Whig	Whig	Whig	Whig	Whig	Liberal	Liberal	Liberal	Liberal	Liberal
Glasgow 2	Whig	Whig	Whig	Whig	Whig	Whig	Whig	Liberal	Liberal	Liberal	Conservative	Liberal
Glasgow 3										Liberal	Liberal	Liberal
Lanarkshire / North Lanarkshire (1868)	Whig	Whig	Conservative	Conservative	Conservative	Conservative	Conservative	Liberal	Liberal	Liberal	Liberal	Liberal
South Lanarkshire										Liberal	Conservative	Liberal

==== 1885 to 1918 ====
Conservative Independent Liberal Labour Liberal Liberal Unionist National Democratic & Labour

Constituency	1885	86	1886	87	88	89	90	91	1892	94	1895	97	99	1900	01	03	04	05	1906	08	09	Jan 10	Dec 10	11	13	15	16	18
Paisley	Barbour							Dunn											McCallum									
Lanarkshire Mid	Mason				Philipps					Caldwell												Whitehouse						
Lanarkshire North East	Crawford										Colville				Rattigan		Findlay					Wilson		Millar				
Glasgow Blackfriars and Hutchesontown	Henry	→	Provand											Bonar Law					Barnes									→
Glasgow Bridgeton	Russell			Trevelyan								Cameron		Dickson					Cleland				MacCallum Scott					
Glasgow College	Cameron										Stirling-Maxwell								Watt									
Govan	Pearce					Wilson								Craig					Duncan			Hunter		Holmes				
Lanarkshire North West	Baird		Cunninghame-Graham						Whitelaw		Holburn		Douglas						Mitchell-Thompson			Pringle						
Ayrshire South	Wason		Vernon						Wason		Arrol								Beale									
Kilmarnock Burghs	Sturrock		Williamson								Denny								Rainy					Gladstone		Shaw		
Glasgow St. Rollox	McCulloch		Caldwell						Carmichael		Begg			Wilson					Wood									
Argyllshire	Macfarlane*		Malcolm						Macfarlane		Nicol					Ainsworth												
Greenock	Sutherland	→												Reid					Stewart			Collins						
Dunbartonshire	A. Orr-Ewing								Sinclair		Wylie								White				Allen					
Lanarkshire South	Hamilton		Hozier																Menzies						Watson			
Partick	Sellar	→					Smith												Balfour									
Renfrewshire West	Campbell								Renshaw										Glen-Coats			Greig						
Glasgow Tradeston	Corbett	→																		→		→	→	White				
Ayr Burghs	Campbell				Sinclair		Somervell		Birkmyre		C. Orr-Ewing						Dobbie		Younger									
Ayrshire North	Elliot	→							Cochrane													Anderson		Campbell			Hunter-Weston	
Glasgow Camlachie	Watt								Cross											→		Mackinder						
Renfrewshire East	Finlayson		Shaw-Stewart																Laidlaw			Gilmour						
Glasgow Central	Beith		Baird																Torrance		Dickson					McLeod		
Buteshire	Robertson							Murray										Lamont				Hope						

==== 1918 to 1950 ====
Coalition Labour Coalition Liberal (1918–22) / National Liberal (1922–23) Communist Conservative Independent Labour Independent Labour Party Labour Liberal National Independent National Labour National Liberal (1931–68) New Party Scottish National Party

Constituency	1918	19	20	1922	1923	24	1924	25	26	29	1929	29	30	31	1931	32	33	1935	36	37	39	40	41	42	43	45	1945	46	47	48
Ayr Burghs	Younger			Baird				Moore																						
Ayrshire N & Bute	Hunter-Weston																	MacAndrew												
Glasgow Central	Bonar Law				Alexander																						Hutchison			
Glasgow Hillhead	Horne																			Reid										Galbraith
Glasgow Pollok	Gilmour																					Galbraith								
Glasgow Kelvingrove	MacLeod			Hutchison		Elliot																					Williams			
Glasgow Cathcart	Pratt			Hay	MacDonald						Train													Beattie				Henderson		
Argyll	Sutherland				→		Macquisten															McCallum								
Renfrewshire E	Johnstone			Nichol			MacRobert						Douglas-Hamilton									Lloyd								
Dunbartonshire	Raeburn				Martin		Fleming		Thom		Brooke				Thom	Cochrane			Cassells				McKinlay							
Lanark	Elliot				Dickson		Mitchell				Dickson				Douglas-Home												Steele			
Glasgow Partick	Balfour			Collie	Young		Broun-Lindsay				McKinlay				MacAndrew			Young												
Lanarkshire N	McLaren			Sullivan			Sprot			Lee					Anstruther-Gray												Herbison			
Renfrewshire W	Greig			Murray			Shaw				Forgan			→	Scrymgeour-Wedderburn												Scollan			
Glasgow Maryhill	Mitchell-Thomson			Muir			Couper				Clarke				Jamieson			Davidson									Hannan			
Motherwell	Nelson			Newbold	Ferguson		Barr								Ormiston			Walker								McIntyre	Anderson			
Greenock	Collins	→		→										→					Gibson				McNeil							
Glasgow Camlachie	Mackinder			Stephen?											Stevenson			Stephen											→	McFarlane
Bothwell	MacDonald	Robertson							Sullivan						Shaw			Welsh									Timmons			
Coatbridge	Buchanan			Welsh											Templeton			Barr									Mann			
Glasgow Springburn	Macquisten			G. Hardie											Emmott			G. Hardie		A. Hardie							Forman			
Kilmarnock	Shaw				Climie		MacAndrew				Climie	Aitchison		→			Lindsay								→		Shaw	Ross		
Rutherglen	Rodger			Wright										Hardie	Moss			Chapman									McAllister			
Glasgow Tradeston	V. Henderson			T. Henderson											McLean			Henderson									Rankin			
Ayrshire South	Brown														MacAndrew			Brown			Sloan							Hughes		
Glasgow St. Rollox	Oliphant-Murray			Stewart										Leonard																
Glasgow Shettleston	Adair			Wheatley									McGovern		→														→	
Paisley	McCallum		Asquith				Mitchell				Welsh				Maclay												Baldwin			Johnston
Dumbarton Burghs	Taylor			Kirkwood											→	→														
Glasgow Bridgeton	Scott			Maxton											→													Carmichael	→	
Glasgow Gorbals	Barnes			Buchanan											→						→									Cullen
Glasgow Govan	Maclean										→				→															
Hamilton	Graham																								Fraser					
Constituency	1918	19	20	1922	1923	24	1924	25	26	29	1929	29	30	31	1931	32	33	1935	36	37	39	40	41	42	43	45	1945	46	47	48

==== 1950 to 1974 (35 constituencies) ====
Conservative Labour National Liberal (1931–68) Scottish National Party

Constituency	1950	50	1951	54	1955	55	58	1959	61	62	64	1964	1966	67	69	70	1970	73
Glasgow Craigton					Browne			Millan										
Argyll	McCallum						Noble											
Ayr	Moore											Younger						
Ayrshire Central	Manuel				Spencer-Nairn			Manuel									Lambie	
Ayrshire North and Bute	MacAndrew							Maclean										
Ayrshire South	Hughes															Sillars		
Bothwell	Timmons											Hamilton						
Coatbridge and Airdrie	Mann							Dempsey										
Dunbartonshire East	Kirkwood		Bence														McCartney	
Dunbartonshire West	McKinlay	Steele															Campbell	
Glasgow Bridgeton	Carmichael								Bennett									
G. Camlachie / G. Provan ('55)	Reid											Brown						
Glasgow Cathcart	Henderson											Taylor						
Glasgow Central	McInnes												McMillan					
Glasgow Gorbals	Cullen														F. McElhone			
Glasgow Govan	Browne				Rankin													MacDonald
Glasgow Hillhead	Galbraith																	
Glasgow Kelvingrove	Elliot						McAlister	Lilley				Miller						
Glasgow Maryhill	Hannan																	
Glasgow Pollok	Galbraith				George							Garrow		Wright			White	
Glasgow Scotstoun	Young	Hutchison						Small										
Glasgow Shettleston	McGovern							Galpern										
Glasgow Springburn	Forman											Buchanan						
Glasgow Woodside	Bennett				Grant					Carmichael								
Greenock	McNeil					Mabon												
Hamilton	Fraser													Ewing			Wilson	
Kilmarnock	Ross																	
Lanark	Douglas-Home		Maitland					Hart										
Lanarkshire North	Herbison																Smith	
Motherwell	Anderson			Lawson														
Paisley	Johnston								J. Robertson									
Renfrewshire East	Lloyd							Anderson										
Renfrewshire West	Maclay											Buchan						
Rutherglen	McAllister		Brooman-White								Mackenzie							
Glasgow Tradeston	Rankin																	
Constituency	1950	50	1951	54	1955	55	58	1959	61	62	64	1964	1966	67	69	70	1970	73

==== 1974 to 1983 (34 constituencies) ====
Conservative Labour Scottish Labour Scottish National Party Social Democratic

Constituency	Feb 74	Oct 74	76	78	1979	80	81	82
Argyll	Maccormick				Mackay			
Ayr	Younger							
Ayrshire Central	Lambie							
Ayrshire North and Bute	Corrie							
Ayrshire South	Sillars		→		Foulkes			
Bothwell	Hamilton							
Coatbridge and Airdrie	Dempsey							Clarke
Dunbartonshire Central	McCartney							
Dunbartonshire East	Henderson	Bain			Hogg			
Dunbartonshire West	Campbell							
East Kilbride	Miller							
Glasgow Cathcart	Taylor				Maxton			
Glasgow Central	McMillan					McTaggart		
Glasgow Craigton	Millan							
Glasgow Garscadden	Small			Dewar				
Glasgow Govan	Selby				McMahon			
Glasgow Hillhead	Galbraith							Jenkins
Glasgow Kelvingrove	Carmichael							
Glasgow Maryhill	Craigen							
Glasgow Pollok	White							
Glasgow Provan	Brown							
Glasgow Queen's Park	F. McElhone							H. McElhone
Glasgow Shettleston	Galpern				Marshall			
Glasgow Springburn	Buchanan				Martin			
Greenock & Port Glasgow	Mabon						→	
Hamilton	Wilson			G. Robertson				
Kilmarnock	Ross				McKelvey			
Lanark	Hart							
Lanarkshire North	Smith							
Motherwell & Wishaw	Lawson	Bray						
Paisley	J. Robertson		→		Adams			
Renfrewshire East	Anderson				Stewart			
Renfrewshire West	Buchan							
Rutherglen	Mackenzie							
Constituency	Feb 74	Oct 74	76	78	1979	80	81	82

==== 1983 to 2005 (33 constituencies) ====
Conservative Independent Labour Liberal Liberal Democrats Respect Scottish National Party Social Democratic Speaker

Constituency	1983	1987	88	89	90	1992	94	1997	97	98	99	00	2001	03	04
Argyll and Bute	MacKay	Michie	→										A. Reid		
Ayr	Younger					Gallie		Osborne							
Carrick, Cumnock & Doon Valley	Foulkes														
Clydebank and Milngavie	McCartney	Worthington													
Clydesdale	Hart	Hood													
Cumbernauld and Kilsyth	Hogg							McKenna							
Cunninghame North	Corrie	Wilson													
Cunninghame South	Lambie					Donohoe									
Dumbarton	Campbell	McFall													
East Kilbride	Miller	Ingram													
Eastwood	Stewart							Murphy							
Glasgow Cathcart	Maxton												Harris		
Glasgow Central	McTaggart			Watson				Abolished							
Glasgow Garscadden / Glasgow Anniesland (1997)	Dewar											J. Robertson			
Glasgow Govan	Millan		Sillars			Davidson		M. Sarwar	→		→				
Glasgow Hillhead / Glasgow Kelvin (1997)	Jenkins	Galloway												→	→
Glasgow Maryhill	Craigen	Fyfe											McKechin		
Glasgow Pollok	White	Dunnachie						Davidson							
Glasgow Provan / Glasgow Baillieston (1997)	H. Brown	Wray													
Glasgow Rutherglen	Mackenzie	McAvoy													
Glasgow Shettleston	Marshall														
Glasgow Springburn	Martin											→			
Greenock & Port Glasgow / Greenock & Inverclyde (1997)	Godman												Cairns		
Hamilton / Hamilton South (1997)	G. Robertson										Tynan				
Kilmarnock and Loudoun	McKelvey							Browne							
Monklands East / Airdrie and Shotts (1997)	Smith						Liddell								
Monklands West / Coatbridge & Chryston (1997)	Clarke														
Motherwell North / Hamilton North and Bellshill (1997)	Hamilton	J. Reid													
Motherwell South / Motherwell and Wishaw (1997)	Bray							Roy							
Paisley North	A. Adams				I. Adams										
Paisley South	Buchan				McMaster				Alexander						
Renfrew West and Inverclyde / West Renfrewshire (1997)	McCurley	Graham								→			Sheridan		
Strathkelvin and Bearsden	Hirst	Galbraith											Lyons		
Constituency	1983	1987	88	89	90	1992	94	1997	97	98	99	00	2001	03	04

==== 2005 to 2024 (25 constituencies) ====
Conservative Independent Labour Liberal Democrats Scottish National Party Speaker

Constituency	2005	08	09	2010	11	2015	15	2017	2019	20	21	22	23
Airdrie and Shotts	J. Reid			Nash		Gray					Qaisar		
Argyll and Bute	A. Reid					O'Hara							
Ayr, Carrick and Cumnock	Osborne					Wilson		Grant	Dorans				
Central Ayrshire	Donohoe					Whitford							
Coatbridge, Chryston & Bellshill	Clarke					Boswell		Gaffney	Bonnar				
Cumbernauld, Kilsyth & Kirkintilloch East	McKenna			McClymont		S. C. McDonald							
East Dunbartonshire	Swinson					Nicolson		Swinson	Callaghan				
East Kilbride, Strathaven & Lesmahagow	Ingram			McCann		Cameron							→
East Renfrewshire	Murphy					Oswald		Masterton	Oswald				
Glasgow Central	M. Sarwar			A. Sarwar		Thewliss							
Glasgow East	Marshall	Mason		Curran		McGarry	→	Linden					
Glasgow North	McKechin					Grady						→	→
Glasgow North East	Martin		Bain			McLaughlin		Sweeney	McLaughlin				
Glasgow North West	J. Robertson					Monaghan							
Glasgow South	Harris					S. M. McDonald							
Glasgow South West	Davidson					Stephens							
Inverclyde	Cairns				McKenzie	Cowan							
Kilmarnock and Loudoun	Browne			Jamieson		A. Brown							
Lanark & Hamilton East	Hood					Crawley							
Motherwell and Wishaw	Roy					Fellows							
North Ayrshire and Arran	Clark					Gibson							
Paisley and Renfrewshire North	Sheridan					Newlands							
Paisley and Renfrewshire South	Alexander					Black							
Rutherglen & Hamilton West	McAvoy			Greatrex		Ferrier		Killen	Ferrier	→			Shanks
West Dunbartonshire	McFall			Doyle		Docherty							
Constituency	2005	08	09	2010	11	2015	15	17	2019	20	21	22	23

==== 2024 to present (24 constituencies) ====
Labour Liberal Democrats Scottish National Party

Constituency	2024
Airdrie and Shotts	Stevenson
Argyll, Bute and South Lochaber	O'Hara
Ayr, Carrick & Cumnock	Stewart
Central Ayrshire	Gemmell
Coatbridge & Bellshill	McNally
Cumbernauld & Kirkintilloch	K. Murray
East Kilbride & Strathaven	Reid
East Renfrewshire	McDougall
Glasgow East	Grady
Glasgow North	Rhodes
Glasgow North East	Burke
Glasgow South	McKee
Glasgow South West	Ahmed
Glasgow West	Ferguson
Hamilton & Clyde Valley	Walker
Inverclyde & Renfrewshire West	McCluskey
Kilmarnock and Loudoun	Jones
Mid Dunbartonshire	S. Murray
Motherwell, Wishaw & Carluke	Nash
North Ayrshire and Arran	Campbell
Paisley and Renfrewshire North	Taylor
Paisley and Renfrewshire South	Baxter
Rutherglen	Shanks
West Dunbartonshire	McAllister

=== Lothian ===
Before 1974 comprising the counties of Linlithgowshire, Edinburghshire and Haddingtonshire.

After 1996 comprising the unitary authorities of City of Edinburgh, West Lothian, East Lothian and Midlothian.

==== 1708 to 1832 ====
- Linlithgowshire
- Linlithgow Burghs
- Edinburghshire
- Edinburgh
- Haddingtonshire
- Haddington Burghs

==== 1832 to 1885 ====
Constituency	1832	1835	1837	1841	1847	1852	1857	1859	1865	1868	1874	1880
Linlithgowshire	Independent	Independent	Independent	Independent	Independent	Independent	Independent	Independent	Liberal	Liberal	Liberal	Liberal
Edinburgh	Whig	Whig	Whig	Whig	Whig	Whig	Whig	Liberal	Liberal	Liberal	Liberal	Liberal
Edinburgh	Whig	Whig	Whig	Whig	Radical	Radical	Whig	Liberal	Liberal	Liberal	Liberal	Liberal
Leith Burghs	Whig	Whig	Whig	Whig	Whig	Whig	Whig	Liberal	Liberal	Liberal	Liberal	Liberal
Midlothian	Whig	Conservative	Whig	Conservative	Conservative	Conservative	Conservative	Conservative	Conservative	Liberal	Conservative	Liberal
Haddington Burghs	Whig	Whig	Whig	Conservative	Conservative	Conservative	Conservative	Conservative	Conservative	Conservative	Conservative	Liberal
Haddingtonshire	Conservative	Whig	Conservative	Conservative	Conservative	Conservative	Conservative	Conservative	Conservative	Conservative	Conservative	Conservative

==== 1885 to 1918 ====
Conservative Independent Liberal Liberal Liberal Unionist

Constituency	1885	86	1886	86	88	1892	93	95	1895	99	1900	1906	09	Jan 1910	10	Dec 1910	11	12	13	14	17
Linlithgowshire	McLagan						Hope		Ure										Pratt		
Edinburgh Central	Wilson		McEwan								Brown	Price									
Edinburgh East	Goschen	→	Wallace							McCrae			Gibson					Hogge			
Edinburgh South	Harrison	Childers				Paul			Cox	Dewar	Agnew	Dewar			Lyell						Parrott
Edinburgh West	Buchanan	→			→	Palmer		McIver					Clyde					→			
Leith Burghs	Jacks	→	Gladstone	Ferguson																Currie	
Midlothian	Gladstone								Gibson-Carmichael		Murray	Primrose		Murray				J. A. Hope			
Haddingtonshire	Haldane																J. D. Hope				

==== 1918 to 1950 ====
Conservative Labour Liberal National Liberal (1931–68)

Constituency	1918	20	1922	1923	1924	27	28	29	1929	31	1931	35	1935	41	43	1945	45	47
Edinburgh South	Murray		Chapman													Darling		
Midlothian and Peebles North	Hope		Hutchison	Clarke	Hutchison			Clarke	Colville						Murray	Hope		
Edinburgh West	Jameson		Phillipps		MacIntyre				Mathers		Normand	Cooper		Hutchison				
Edinburgh North	Clyde	Ford		Raffan	Ford								Erskine-Hill			Willis		
Edinburgh Central	Graham										Guy			Watt		Gilzean		
Leith	Benn					Brown				→						Hoy		
Peebles and South Midlothian	Maclean		Westwood								Ramsay					Pryde		
Linlithgow	Kidd		Shinwell		Kidd		Shinwell				Baillie		Mathers					
Edinburgh East	Hogge				Shiels						Mason		Pethick-Lawrence				Thomson	Wheatley

==== 1950 to 1983 ====
Conservative Labour

Constituency	1950	1951	54	55	1955	57	1959	60	62	1964	1966	1970	73	Feb 1974	Oct 1974	1979
Edinburgh South	Darling					Hutchison										Ancram
Edinburgh Pentlands	Hope									Wylie				Rifkind		
Edinburgh West	Hutchison						Stodart								Douglas-Hamilton	
Edinburgh North	Clyde			Milligan				Scott					Fletcher			
Edinburgh Central	Gilzean	Oswald												Cook		
Edinburgh Leith	Hoy											Murray				Brown
Midlothian & Peebles / Midlothian ('55)	Pryde						Hill				Eadie					
West Lothian	Mathers	Taylor							Dalyell							
Edinburgh East	Wheatley		Willis									Strang				

==== 1983 to 2005 ====
Conservative Labour Liberal Democrats

Constituency	1983	1987	1992	1997	2001
East Lothian	Robertson				Picking
Edinburgh Central	Fletcher	Darling			
Edinburgh East / Edinburgh E & Musselburgh (1997)	Strang				
Edinburgh Leith / Edinburgh North and Leith (1997)	Brown		Chisholm		Lazarowicz
Edinburgh Pentlands	Rifkind			Clark	
Edinburgh South	Ancram	Griffiths			
Edinburgh West	Douglas-Hamilton			Gorrie	Barrett
Linlithgow	Dalyell				
Livingston	Cook				
Midlothian	Eadie		Clarke		Hamilton

==== 2005 to present ====
Alba Independent Labour Liberal Democrats Scottish National Party

Constituency	2005	05	2010	2015	15	2017	2019	21	2024
East Lothian	Picking		O'Donnell	Kerevan		Whitfield	MacAskill	→	Alexander
Edinburgh East / Edinburgh E & Musselburgh (2024)	Strang		Gilmore	Sheppard					C. Murray
Edinburgh North and Leith	Lazarowicz			Brock					Gilbert
Edinburgh South	Griffiths		I. Murray						
Edinburgh South West	Darling			Cherry					Arthur
Edinburgh West	Barrett		Crockart	Thomson	→	Jardine			
Linlithgow & E Falkirk / Bathgate & Linlithgow (2024)	Connarty			Day					Sullivan
Livingston	Cook	Devine	Morrice	Bardell					Poynton
Midlothian	Hamilton			Thompson		Rowley	Thompson		McNeill

=== Dumfries and Galloway and Borders ===
Before 1974 comprising the counties of Dumfriesshire, Kirkcudbrightshire, Wigtownshire, Peeblesshire, Selkirkshire, Roxburghshire and Berwickshire.

After 1996 comprising the unitary authorities of Dumfries and Galloway and Scottish Borders.

==== 1708 to 1832 ====
- Dumfriesshire
- Dumfries Burghs
- Wigtownshire
- Wigtown Burghs
- Kirkcudbrightshire
- Peeblesshire
- Selkirkshire
- Roxburghshire
- Berwickshire

==== 1832 to 1885 ====
Constituency	1832	1835	1837	1841	1847	1852	1857	1859	1865	1868	1874	1880
Dumfries Burghs	Whig	Whig	Whig	Whig	Whig	Whig	Whig	Liberal	Liberal	Liberal	Liberal	Liberal
Dumfriesshire	Conservative	Conservative	Conservative	Conservative	Conservative	Conservative	Conservative	Conservative	Conservative	Liberal	Conservative	Liberal
Wigtown Burghs	Whig	Whig	Whig	Whig	Whig	Whig	Whig	Liberal	Liberal	Liberal	Conservative	Liberal
Wigtownshire	Whig	Whig	Conservative	Whig	Whig	Whig	Whig	Liberal	Liberal	Conservative	Conservative	Conservative
Kirkcudbright Stewartry	Whig	Independent	Independent	Independent	Whig	Independent	Independent	Independent	Independent	Independent	Independent	Independent
Peeblesshire / Peebles and Selkirk (1868)	Conservative	Independent	Independent	Independent	Independent	Independent	Independent	Independent	Independent	Independent	Independent	Liberal
Selkirkshire	Whig	Conservative	Conservative	Conservative	Conservative	Conservative	Conservative	Conservative	Conservative			
Hawick Burghs										Liberal	Liberal	Liberal
Roxburghshire	Whig	Independent	Independent	Independent	Independent	Independent	Independent	Independent	Independent	Independent	Independent	Liberal
Berwickshire	Whig	Independent	Independent	Independent	Conservative	Conservative	Conservative	Liberal	Liberal	Liberal	Conservative	Liberal

==== 1885 to 1918 ====
Conservative Liberal Liberal Unionist

Constituency	1885	86	1886	1892	94	1895	1900	1906	09	Jan 1910	Dec 1910	15
Berwickshire	Marjoribanks				Tennant							
Dumfries Burghs	Noel		Reid					Gulland				
Dumfriesshire	Jardine	→		Maxwell		Souttar	Maxwell	Molteno				
Hawick Burghs	Trevelyan	→	Brown	Shaw					Barran			
Kirkcudbright Stewartry	McTaggart-Stewart							McMicking		McTaggart-Stewart	McMicking	
Peeblesshire & Selkirkshire	Tennant		Thorburn					Murray		Younger	Maclean	
Roxburghshire	Elliot	→		Napier		Montagu-Douglas-Scott		Jardine				
Wigtownshire	Maxwell							J. Dalrymple				H. Dalrymple

==== 1918 to 1950 ====
Coalition Liberal (1918–22) / National Liberal (1922–23) Conservative Independent Conservative Labour Liberal National Liberal (1931–68) New Party

Constituency	1918	1922	1923	1924	25	1929	31	1931	31	35	1935	1945	48
Berwick & Haddington	Hope	Waring	Spence	Crookshank		Sinkinson		McEwen				Robertson	
Dumfriesshire	Murray	Chapple		Charteris		Hunter			→	Fildes		Macpherson	
Galloway	McMicking	Dudgeon		Henniker-Hughan	Streatfeild	Dudgeon	→	Mackie				→	→
Roxburgh & Selkirk	Munro	Henderson	Montagu Douglas Scott								Montagu Douglas Scott		

==== 1950 to 1983 ====
Conservative Labour Liberal National Liberal (1931–68) Scottish National Party

Constituency	1950	1951	55	59	59	63	1964	65	1966	1970	Feb 74	Oct 74	78	1979
Berwick & East Lothian	Robertson	Anstruther-Gray							Mackintosh		Ancram	Mackintosh	Robertson	
Dumfries	Macpherson					Anderson	Monro							
Galloway	Mackie			Brewis								Thompson		Lang
Roxburgh & Selkirk / R., S. & Peebles ('55)	Macdonald	Donaldson						Steel						

==== 1983 to present ====
Conservative Labour Liberal Liberal Democrats Scottish National Party

Constituency	1983	1987	88	1992	1997	2001	2005	2010	2015	2017	2019	2024
Dumfriesshire / D'shire, Clydesdale & Tweeddale (2005)	Monro				Brown		Mundell					
Galloway & Upper Nithsdale / Dumfries & Galloway (2005)	Lang				Morgan	Duncan	Brown		Arkless	Jack		Cooper
Roxburgh & Berwickshire / B'shire, Roxburgh & Selkirk ('05)	Kirkwood		→				Moore		Kerr	Lamont		
Tweeddale, Ettrick and Lauderdale	Steel		→		Moore							

=== Non-geographic ===
==== 1832 to 1885 ====
Constituency	1832	1835	1837	1841	1847	1852	1857	1859	1865	1868	1869	1874	1874	1876	1880
Edinburgh and St Andrews Universities										Playfair					
Glasgow and Aberdeen Universities										Moncreiff	Gordon			Watson	Campbell

==== 1885 to 1918 ====
Constituency	1885	1986	1886	1888	1890	1892	1895	1896	1900	1900	1906	1910	1910	1912	1916	1917
Edinburgh and St Andrews Universities	Macdonald			Stormonth-Darling	Pearson			Priestley	Tuke			Finlay		→	Johnston	Cheyne
Glasgow and Aberdeen Universities	Campbell										Craik					

==== 1918 to 1950 ====
Constituency	1918	1922	1923	1924	1927	1929	1931	1934	1935	1935	1936	1938	1945	1945	1946
Combined Scottish Universities	Cheyne	Berry					Skelton			Ramsay MacDonald	Anderson				
Combined Scottish Universities	Cowan	→						Morrison	→					Boyd-Orr	Elliot
Combined Scottish Universities	Craik	→			Buchan				Kerr						

== Sources ==
- British Historical Facts 1760–1830 by Chris Cook and John Stevenson
- British Parliamentary Election Results 1832–1983, (5 volumes) edited by F.W.S. Craig

== See also ==
- List of constituencies in the Parliament of Scotland at the time of the Union
