= 1912 Glasgow St Rollox by-election =

UK parliamentary by-election

- 26 February 1912
- Registered: 20,079
- Turnout: 82.63% (▼1.04%)
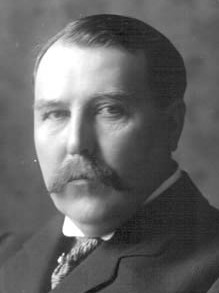
	First party	Second party
		LUP
Candidate	McKinnon Wood	Frederick Alexander Macquisten
Party	Liberal	Liberal Unionist
Alliance	Labour	British Socialist
Popular vote	8,530	8,061
Percentage	51.41%	48.59%
Swing	▼4.34%	▲4.34%
MP before election
McKinnon Wood
Liberal
Subsequent MP
McKinnon Wood
Liberal

The 1912 Glasgow St Rollox by-election was a Parliamentary by-election held on 26 February 1912. The constituency returned one Member of Parliament (MP) to the House of Commons of the United Kingdom, elected by the first past the post voting system.

== Previous result ==
General election December 1910: Glasgow St Rollox Electorate 19,918
Party	Candidate	Votes	%	±%
Liberal	McKinnon Wood	9,291	55.7	−3.7
Liberal Unionist	Arthur Robert Chamberlayne	7,374	44.2	+3.7
Majority		1,917	11.5	−7.5
Turnout		16,665	82.6	−2.3
Liberal hold		Swing	-3.7	

== Campaign ==
The British Socialist Party who were unable to organise themselves a candidate to contest the election, decided nevertheless to campaign in the constituency. They issued a leaflet and toured the various works, lecturing the voters. They were critical of the electoral alliance between the Liberal and Labour parties and called on the electors to vote for the Unionist Party candidate.

== Result ==
The Liberal Party held the seat.

1912 Glasgow St Rollox by-election
Party	Candidate	Votes	%	±%
Liberal	Thomas Wood	8,530	51.41	−4.34
Liberal Unionist	Frederick Alexander Macquisten	8,061	48.59	+4.34
Majority		469	2.82	−8.68
Turnout		16,591	82.63	−1.04
Registered electors		20,079		
Liberal hold		Swing	−4.34	

== Aftermath ==
A General Election was due to take place by the end of 1915. By the autumn of 1914, the following candidates had been adopted to contest that election. Due to the outbreak of war, the election never took place

General Election 1914/15: Glasgow St Rollox Electorate 24,387
Party	Candidate	Votes	%	±%
Liberal	McKinnon Wood			
Unionist				

General election 1918: St Rollox
Party		Candidate	Votes	%	±%
C	Unionist	Gideon Oliphant-Murray	10,844	58.58	+14.33
	Labour	James Stewart	6,147	33.21	New
	Liberal	Thomas McKinnon Wood	1,521	8.22	−47.53
Majority			4,697	25.37	N/A
Turnout			18,512	48.16	−35.51
Registered electors			38,439		
	Unionist gain from Liberal		Swing		
C indicates candidate endorsed by the coalition government.
