= Financial Secretary to the Treasury =

Junior minister in the British Treasury

United Kingdom Financial Secretary to the Treasury
- Royal Arms of His Majesty's Government

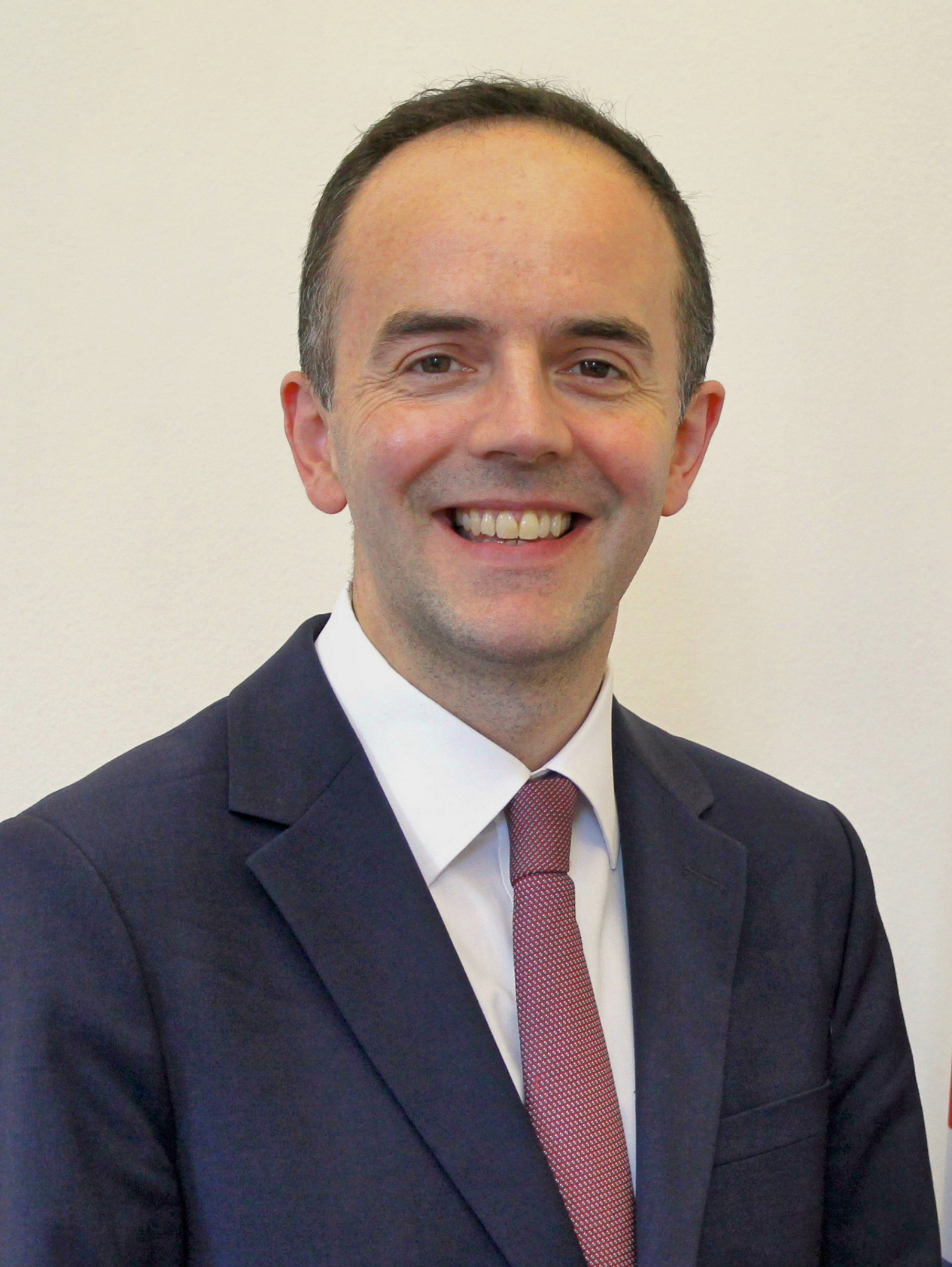
- Incumbent; James Murray since 21 July 2026
- His Majesty's Treasury
- Reports to: First Lord of the Treasury (Prime Minister); Second Lord of the Treasury (Chancellor)
- Nominator: Prime Minister
- Appointer: The King (on the advice of the Prime Minister)
- Term length: At His Majesty's pleasure
- Inaugural holder: Thomas Harley
- Formation: 11 June 1711
- Website: Official website

The financial secretary to the Treasury is a mid-level ministerial post in HM Treasury. It is nominally the fifth–most significant ministerial role within the Treasury after the first lord of the Treasury, the chancellor of the Exchequer, the chief secretary to the Treasury, and the paymaster general. However, the role of First Lord of the Treasury is always held by the prime minister who is not a Treasury minister, and the position of Paymaster General is a sinecure often held by the Minister for the Cabinet Office to allow the holder of that office to draw a government salary. In practice, the Financial Secretary to the Treasury is, therefore, the third–most senior Treasury ministerial position, and in the past its holder has been known to attend Cabinet.

The current holder of the position is James Murray, who was appointed by Prime Minister Andy Burnham following the establishment of the Burnham ministry. The position is shadowed by the shadow financial secretary to the treasury.

== History ==
The role of Financial Secretary to the Treasury was created in 1711 and was known as the Junior Secretary to the Treasury to help deal with the increasing workload of the Senior Secretary to the Treasury. The first Junior Secretary to the Treasury is recorded as Thomas Harley who was appointed on 11 June 1711. The position has continued without any major interruption to the present day. Initially when the position of Senior Secretary to the Treasury became vacant not as the result of an election of change of government the Junior Secretary was usually automatically promoted to the senior role. Over time however, the roles of the Senior and Junior Secretaries began to diverge with the Senior Secretary post being used as a sinecure post for the Chief Whip, with no formal responsibilities to the Treasury. The Junior Secretary, however, remained a substantive position working in the Treasury. As such, the Senior Secretary became known as the 'Parliamentary Secretary to the Treasury' while the Junior Secretary became known as the 'Financial Secretary to the Treasury' and the 'automatic' promotion from Junior to Senior ceased. The exact date when this change occurred is disputed, but it is agreed that by 1830 the distinction was complete.

In 1923, Sir William Joynson-Hicks became – to date – the only financial secretary to concurrently serve in the Cabinet; this was owing to the Prime Minister, Stanley Baldwin, simultaneously holding the office of Chancellor of the Exchequer.

In May 2010, as part of the ministerial reorganisation by the First Cameron ministry, the financial secretary was given the additional semi-official title of City Minister. This position was retained until April 2014, when – following the promotion of Sajid Javid to Secretary of State for Culture, Media and Sport – the portfolio of City Minister was moved from the financial secretary to the Treasury to the economic secretary of the Treasury.

Appointment to the position of Financial Secretary to the Treasury is often considered an important stepping stone in a politician's career; six of the ten most recent holders of the office have gone on to hold Cabinet-level positions.

Notable former financial secretaries to the Treasury include Lord Frederick Cavendish, Austen Chamberlain, Stanley Baldwin, Enoch Powell, Nigel Lawson and Norman Lamont.

== Current role ==
The current duties of the financial secretary to the Treasury include departmental responsibility for the Office for National Statistics and the Royal Mint. The financial secretary to the Treasury had departmental responsibility for HM Customs & Excise until the merger with the Inland Revenue to form HM Revenue & Customs.

== List of financial secretaries to the Treasury since 1830 ==
see Secretary to the Treasury for earlier incumbents

Colour key (for political parties):
Conservative Liberal Peelite Tories Whig Labour Liberal National Liberal Unionist National Labour None Unionist

Financial Secretary	Term of office		Political party	Prime Minister	Chancellor
Thomas Spring Rice; MP for Limerick until 1832 then Cambridge from 1832	26 November 1830	6 June 1834	Whig	Earl Grey	Viscount Althorp
Francis Baring; MP for Portsmouth	6 June 1834	14 November 1834	Whig	Earl Grey	Viscount Althorp
Francis Baring; MP for Portsmouth	6 June 1834	14 November 1834	Whig	Viscount Melbourne	Viscount Althorp
Office not in use	15 November 1834 – 19 December 1834			Duke of Wellington (Caretaker)	Lord Denman; LCJ (interim)
Thomas Fremantle; MP for Buckingham	20 December 1834	April 1835	Conservative or Tory	Peel	Peel
Francis Baring; MP for Portsmouth	21 April 1835	26 August 1839	Whig	Viscount Melbourne	Spring Rice
Robert Gordon; MP for New Windsor	6 September 1839	1841	Whig	Viscount Melbourne	Baring
Richard More O'Ferrall; MP for County Kildare	9 June 1841	30 August 1841	Whig	Viscount Melbourne	Baring
George Clerk; MP for Stamford	8 September 1841	1845	Conservative	Peel	Goulburn
Edward Cardwell; MP for Clitheroe	4 February 1845	29 June 1846	Conservative	Peel	Goulburn
John Parker; MP for Sheffield	7 July 1846	1849	Whig	Lord John Russell	Wood
William Goodenough Hayter; MP for Wells	22 May 1849	1850	Whig	Lord John Russell	Wood
George Cornewall Lewis; MP for Herefordshire	9 July 1850	1852	Whig	Lord John Russell	Wood
George Alexander Hamilton; MP for Dublin City	2 March 1852	1852	Conservative	Earl of Derby	Disraeli
James Wilson; MP for Westbury until 1957 then Devonport	5 January 1853	19 February 1858	Whig	Earl of Aberdeen (Coalition)	Gladstone
James Wilson; MP for Westbury until 1957 then Devonport	5 January 1853	19 February 1858	Whig	Viscount Palmerston	Lewis
George Alexander Hamilton; MP for Dublin University	2 March 1858	1859	Conservative	Earl of Derby	Disraeli
Stafford Northcote; MP for Stamford	21 January 1859	1859	Conservative	Earl of Derby	Disraeli
Samuel Laing; MP for Wick Burghs	24 June 1859	1860	Liberal	Viscount Palmerston	Gladstone
Frederick Peel; MP for Bury	2 November 1860	1865	Liberal	Viscount Palmerston	Gladstone
Hugh Childers; MP for Pontefract	19 August 1865	26 June 1866	Liberal	Viscount Palmerston	Gladstone
Hugh Childers; MP for Pontefract	19 August 1865	26 June 1866	Liberal	Earl Russell	Gladstone
George Ward Hunt; MP for North Northamptonshire	14 July 1866	29 February 1868	Conservative	Earl of Derby	Disraeli
George Sclater-Booth; MP for North Hampshire	4 March 1868	1 December 1868	Conservative	Disraeli	Hunt
Acton Smee Ayrton; MP for Tower Hamlets	9 December 1868	1869	Liberal	Gladstone	Lowe
James Stansfeld; MP for Halifax	2 November 1869	1871	Liberal	Gladstone	Lowe
William Edward Baxter; MP for Montrose Burghs	17 March 1871	11 August 1873	Liberal	Gladstone	Lowe
John Dodson; MP for East Sussex	11 August 1873	1874	Liberal	Gladstone	Gladstone
William Henry Smith; MP for Westminster	21 February 1874	1877	Conservative	Disraeli	Northcote
Frederick Stanley; MP for North Lancashire	14 August 1877	1878	Conservative	Disraeli	Northcote
Henry Selwin-Ibbetson; MP for West Essex	2 April 1878	21 April 1880	Conservative	Disraeli	Northcote
Lord Frederick Cavendish; MP for West Riding of Yorkshire North	28 April 1880	1882	Liberal	Gladstone	Gladstone
Leonard Courtney; MP for Liskeard	6 May 1882	12 December 1884	Liberal	Gladstone	Gladstone
Leonard Courtney; MP for Liskeard	6 May 1882	12 December 1884	Liberal	Gladstone	Childers
J. T. Hibbert; MP for Oldham	12 December 1884	9 June 1885	Liberal	Gladstone	Childers
Henry Holland; MP for Midhurst	24 June 1885	1885	Conservative	Marquess of Salisbury	Hicks Beach
Matthew White Ridley; MP for North Northumberland until 1985 then Blackpool from 1986	1885	1886	Conservative	Marquess of Salisbury	Hicks Beach
William Jackson; MP for Leeds North	1886	28 January 1886	Conservative	Marquess of Salisbury	Hicks Beach
Henry Fowler; MP for Wolverhampton East	6 February 1886	20 July 1886	Liberal	Gladstone	Harcourt
William Jackson; MP for Leeds North	3 August 1886	1891	Conservative	Marquess of Salisbury	Lord Randolph Churchill
William Jackson; MP for Leeds North	3 August 1886	1891	Conservative	Marquess of Salisbury	Viscount Goschen
John Eldon Gorst; MP for Chatham	9 November 1891	11 August 1892	Conservative	Marquess of Salisbury	Viscount Goschen
J. T. Hibbert; MP for Oldham	18 August 1892	22 June 1895	Liberal	Gladstone	Harcourt
J. T. Hibbert; MP for Oldham	18 August 1892	22 June 1895	Liberal	Earl of Rosebery	Harcourt
Robert William Hanbury; MP for Preston	29 June 1895	1900	Conservative	Marquess of Salisbury (Unionist Coalition)	Hicks Beach
Austen Chamberlain; MP for East Worcestershire	7 November 1900	11 August 1902	Liberal Unionist	Marquess of Salisbury (Unionist Coalition)	Hicks Beach
Austen Chamberlain; MP for East Worcestershire	7 November 1900	11 August 1902	Liberal Unionist	Balfour (Unionist Coalition)	Hicks Beach
William Fisher; MP for Fulham	11 August 1902	April 1903	Conservative	Balfour (Unionist Coalition)	Ritchie
Arthur Elliot; MP for Durham	10 April 1903	9 October 1903	Conservative	Balfour (Unionist Coalition)	Ritchie
Victor Cavendish; MP for West Derbyshire	9 October 1903	5 December 1905	Liberal Unionist	Balfour (Unionist Coalition)	A. Chamberlain
Reginald McKenna; MP for North Monmouthshire	12 December 1905	23 January 1907	Liberal	Campbell-Bannerman	Asquith
Walter Runciman; MP for Dewsbury	29 January 1907	1908	Liberal	Campbell-Bannerman	Asquith
Charles Hobhouse; MP for Bristol East	12 April 1908	1911	Liberal	Asquith (I)	Lloyd George
Thomas McKinnon Wood; MP for Glasgow St Rollox	23 October 1911	13 February 1912	Liberal	Asquith (I)	Lloyd George
Charles Masterman; MP for Bethnal Green South West	13 February 1912	11 February 1914	Liberal	Asquith (I)	Lloyd George
Edwin Montagu; MP for Chesterton	11 February 1914	3 February 1915	Liberal	Asquith (I)	Lloyd George
Francis Dyke Acland; MP for Camborne	3 February 1915	25 May 1915	Liberal	Asquith (I)	Lloyd George
Edwin Montagu; MP for Chesterton	26 May 1915	9 July 1916	Liberal	Asquith (Coalition)	McKenna
Thomas McKinnon Wood; MP for Glasgow St Rollox	9 July 1916	5 December 1916	Liberal	Asquith (Coalition)	McKenna
Hardman Lever; Baronet	15 December 1916	19 May 1919^{[Note 1]}	None; Civil servant	Lloyd George (Coalition)	Law (December 1916 – January 1919); A. Chamberlain (January 1919 – April 1921)
Stanley Baldwin; MP for Bewdley	18 June 1917^{[Note 1]}	1 April 1921	Conservative	Lloyd George (Coalition)	Law (December 1916 – January 1919); A. Chamberlain (January 1919 – April 1921)
Hilton Young; MP for Norwich	21 April 1921	19 October 1922	Liberal	Lloyd George (Coalition)	Horne
John Hills; MP for City of Durham	6 November 1922	1923	Conservative	Law	Baldwin
Archibald Boyd-Carpenter; MP for Bradford North	12 March 1923	May 1923	Conservative	Law	Baldwin
William Joynson-Hicks; MP for Twickenham	25 May 1923	27 August 1923^{[Note 2]}	Conservative	Baldwin	Baldwin
Walter Guinness; MP for Bury St Edmunds	5 October 1923	1923	Conservative	Baldwin	N. Chamberlain
William Graham; MP for Edinburgh Central	23 January 1924	4 November 1924	Labour	MacDonald	Snowden
Walter Guinness; MP for Bury St Edmunds	11 November 1924	5 November 1925	Conservative	Baldwin	Churchill
Ronald McNeill; MP for Canterbury	5 November 1925	1 November 1927	Conservative	Baldwin	Churchill
Arthur Samuel; MP for Farnham	1 November 1927	5 June 1929	Conservative	Baldwin	Churchill
Frederick Pethick-Lawrence; MP for Leicester West	11 June 1929	August 1931	Labour	MacDonald (II)	Snowden
Walter Elliot; MP for Glasgow Kelvingrove	24 August 1931	29 September 1932	Unionist	MacDonald (First National ministry)	Snowden
Walter Elliot; MP for Glasgow Kelvingrove	24 August 1931	29 September 1932	Unionist	MacDonald (Second National ministry)	N. Chamberlain
Leslie Hore-Belisha; MP for Plymouth Devonport	29 September 1932	29 June 1934	Liberal National	MacDonald (Second National ministry)	N. Chamberlain
Duff Cooper; MP for Westminster St George's	29 June 1934	22 November 1935	Conservative	MacDonald (Second National ministry)	N. Chamberlain
Duff Cooper; MP for Westminster St George's	29 June 1934	22 November 1935	Conservative	Baldwin (Third National ministry)	N. Chamberlain
William Morrison; MP for Cirencester and Tewkesbury	22 November 1935	29 October 1936	Conservative	Baldwin (Third National ministry)	N. Chamberlain
John Colville; MP for Midlothian and Peebles Northern	29 October 1936	1938	Unionist	Baldwin (Third National ministry)	N. Chamberlain
John Colville; MP for Midlothian and Peebles Northern	29 October 1936	1938	Unionist	N. Chamberlain (Fourth National ministry)	Simon
Euan Wallace; MP for Hornsey	16 May 1938	21 April 1939	Conservative	N. Chamberlain (Fourth National ministry)	Simon
Harry Crookshank; MP for Gainsborough	21 April 1939	7 February 1943	Conservative	N. Chamberlain (Fourth National ministry)	Simon
Harry Crookshank; MP for Gainsborough	21 April 1939	7 February 1943	Conservative	N. Chamberlain (War)	Simon
Harry Crookshank; MP for Gainsborough	21 April 1939	7 February 1943	Conservative	Churchill (War)	Wood
Ralph Assheton; MP for Rushcliffe	7 February 1943	29 October 1944	Conservative	Churchill (War)	Wood
Ralph Assheton; MP for Rushcliffe	7 February 1943	29 October 1944	Conservative	Churchill (War)	Anderson
Osbert Peake; MP for Leeds North	29 October 1944	26 July 1945	Conservative	Churchill (War)	Anderson
Osbert Peake; MP for Leeds North	29 October 1944	26 July 1945	Conservative	Churchill (Caretaker)	Anderson
William Glenvil Hall; MP for Colne Valley	4 August 1945	2 March 1950	Labour	Attlee	Dalton
William Glenvil Hall; MP for Colne Valley	4 August 1945	2 March 1950	Labour	Attlee	Cripps
Douglas Jay; MP for Battersea North	2 March 1950	26 October 1951	Labour	Attlee	Cripps
Douglas Jay; MP for Battersea North	2 March 1950	26 October 1951	Labour	Attlee	Gaitskell
John Boyd-Carpenter; MP for Kingston-upon-Thames	30 October 1951	28 July 1954	Conservative	Churchill	Butler
Henry Brooke; MP for Hampstead	28 July 1954	January 1957	Conservative	Churchill	Butler
Henry Brooke; MP for Hampstead	28 July 1954	January 1957	Conservative	Eden	Butler
Henry Brooke; MP for Hampstead	28 July 1954	January 1957	Conservative	Eden	Macmillan
Enoch Powell; MP for Wolverhampton South West	14 January 1957	15 January 1958	Conservative	Macmillan	Thorneycroft
Jack Simon; MP for Middlesbrough West	15 January 1958	22 October 1959	Conservative	Macmillan	Heathcoat-Amory
Edward Boyle; MP for Birmingham Handsworth	22 October 1959	16 July 1962	Conservative	Macmillan	Heathcoat-Amory
Edward Boyle; MP for Birmingham Handsworth	22 October 1959	16 July 1962	Conservative	Macmillan	Lloyd
Anthony Barber; MP for Doncaster	16 July 1962	20 October 1963	Conservative	Macmillan	Maudling
Alan Green; MP for Preston South	23 October 1963	16 October 1964	Conservative	Douglas-Home	Maudling
Niall MacDermot; MP for Derby North	21 October 1964	29 August 1967	Labour	Wilson	Callaghan
Harold Lever; MP for Manchester Cheetham	29 August 1967	13 October 1969	Labour	Wilson	Callaghan
Harold Lever; MP for Manchester Cheetham	29 August 1967	13 October 1969	Labour	Wilson	Jenkins
Dick Taverne; MP for Lincoln	13 October 1969	19 June 1970	Labour	Wilson	Jenkins
Patrick Jenkin; MP for Wanstead and Woodford	19 June 1970	7 April 1972	Conservative	Heath	Macleod
Patrick Jenkin; MP for Wanstead and Woodford	19 June 1970	7 April 1972	Conservative	Heath	Barber
Terrence Higgins; MP for Worthing	7 April 1972	4 March 1974	Conservative	Heath	Barber
John Gilbert; MP for Dudley East	8 March 1974	17 June 1975	Labour	Wilson	Healey
Robert Sheldon; MP for Ashton under Lyne	17 June 1975	4 May 1979	Labour	Wilson	Healey
Robert Sheldon; MP for Ashton under Lyne	17 June 1975	4 May 1979	Labour	Callaghan	Healey
Nigel Lawson; MP for Blaby	4 May 1979	14 September 1981	Conservative	Thatcher	Howe
Nicholas Ridley; MP for Cirencester and Tewkesbury	September 1981	11 June 1983	Conservative	Thatcher	Howe
John Moore; MP for Croydon Central	19 October 1983	21 May 1986	Conservative	Thatcher	Lawson
Norman Lamont; MP for Kingston-upon-Thames	21 May 1986	24 July 1989	Conservative	Thatcher	Lawson
Peter Lilley; MP for St Albans	24 July 1989	14 July 1990	Conservative	Thatcher	Lawson
Peter Lilley; MP for St Albans	24 July 1989	14 July 1990	Conservative	Thatcher	Major
Francis Maude; MP for North Warwickshire	14 July 1990	9 April 1992	Conservative	Major	Lamont
Stephen Dorrell; MP for Loughborough	11 April 1992	11 July 1994	Conservative	Major	Lamont
Stephen Dorrell; MP for Loughborough	11 April 1992	11 July 1994	Conservative	Major	Clarke
George Young; MP for Ealing Acton	11 July 1994	5 July 1995	Conservative	Major	Clarke
Michael Jack; MP for Fylde	5 July 1995	2 May 1997	Conservative	Major	Clarke
Dawn Primarolo; MP for Bristol South	2 May 1997	4 January 1999	Labour	Blair	Brown
Barbara Roche; MP for Hornsey and Wood Green	4 January 1999	29 July 1999	Labour	Blair	Brown
Stephen Timms; MP for East Ham	29 July 1999	8 June 2001	Labour	Blair	Brown
Paul Boateng; MP for Brent South	8 June 2001	May 2002	Labour	Blair	Brown
Ruth Kelly; MP for Bolton West	May 2002	9 September 2004	Labour	Blair	Brown
Stephen Timms; MP for East Ham	12 September 2004	6 May 2005	Labour	Blair	Brown
John Healey; MP for Wentworth	6 May 2005	28 June 2007	Labour	Blair	Brown
Jane Kennedy; MP for Liverpool Wavertree	28 June 2007	5 October 2008	Labour	Brown	Darling
Stephen Timms; MP for East Ham	5 October 2008	11 May 2010	Labour	Brown	Darling
Mark Hoban; MP for Fareham	13 May 2010	4 September 2012	Conservative	Cameron (Coalition)	Osborne
Greg Clark; MP for Tunbridge Wells	4 September 2012	7 October 2013	Conservative	Cameron (Coalition)	Osborne
Sajid Javid; MP for Bromsgrove	7 October 2013	9 April 2014	Conservative	Cameron (Coalition)	Osborne
Nicky Morgan; MP for Loughborough	9 April 2014	15 July 2014	Conservative	Cameron (Coalition)	Osborne
David Gauke; MP for South West Hertfordshire	15 July 2014	14 July 2016	Conservative	Cameron (Coalition)	Osborne
David Gauke; MP for South West Hertfordshire	15 July 2014	14 July 2016	Conservative	Cameron (II)	Osborne
Jane Ellison; MP for Battersea	15 July 2016	9 June 2017	Conservative	May (I)	Hammond
Mel Stride; MP for Central Devon	12 June 2017	23 May 2019	Conservative	May (II)	Hammond
Jesse Norman; MP for Hereford and South Herefordshire	23 May 2019	16 September 2021	Conservative	May (II)	Hammond
Jesse Norman; MP for Hereford and South Herefordshire	23 May 2019	16 September 2021	Conservative	Johnson	Javid
Jesse Norman; MP for Hereford and South Herefordshire	23 May 2019	16 September 2021	Conservative	Johnson	Sunak
Lucy Frazer; MP for South East Cambridgeshire	16 September 2021	7 September 2022	Conservative	Johnson	Sunak
Lucy Frazer; MP for South East Cambridgeshire	16 September 2021	7 September 2022	Conservative	Johnson	Zahawi
Andrew Griffith; MP for Arundel and South Downs	8 September 2022	27 October 2022	Conservative	Truss	Kwarteng
Andrew Griffith; MP for Arundel and South Downs	8 September 2022	27 October 2022	Conservative	Truss	Hunt
Victoria Atkins; MP for Louth and Horncastle	27 October 2022	13 November 2023	Conservative	Sunak	Hunt
Nigel Huddleston; MP for Mid Worcestershire	13 November 2023	5 July 2024	Conservative	Sunak	Hunt
Spencer Livermore, Baron Livermore	8 July 2024	20 July 2026	Labour	Starmer	Reeves
James Murray; MP for Ealing North	21 July 2026	Incumbent	Labour	Burnham	Healey

Note 1. Between June 1917 and May 1919 Lever and Baldwin jointly held the position of Financial Secretary.
Note 2. As Baldwin was both Prime Minister and Chancellor of the Exchequer Joynson-Hicks was a member of the Cabinet.

== See also ==
- Secretary to the Treasury
- Chief Secretary to the Treasury
