= Hardman Lever =

English accountant and civil servant

Sir Hardman Lever Bt KCB
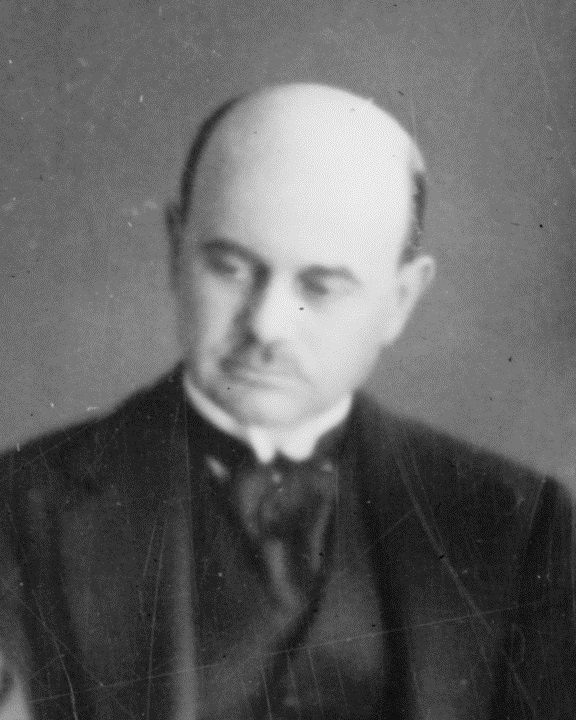
- Lever in 1917

Financial Secretary to the Treasury
- In office 15 December 1916 – 19 May 1919
- Monarch: George V
- Prime Minister: David Lloyd George
- Preceded by: Thomas McKinnon Wood
- Succeeded by: Stanley Baldwin

Personal details
- Born: 18 April 1869
- Died: 1 July 1947 (aged 78)

Sir Samuel Hardman Lever, 1st Baronet, KCB (18 April 1869 – 1 July 1947), generally known as Sir Hardman Lever, and as "Sammie" to his friends, was an English accountant and civil servant.

Lever was born in Bootle, Lancashire, and was educated at Merchant Taylors' School. He qualified as a chartered accountant in 1890. He worked as an accountant in Liverpool, New York City and London.

In August 1915, he was appointed Assistant Financial Secretary at the Ministry of Munitions, where he was in charge of contracts and finance. At the end of 1916, he was appointed Financial Secretary to the Treasury, usually a political office, and nominally held the post until 1921. From 1917 he held the post jointly with Stanley Baldwin and after 1919 left most of the duties to the latter.

He also served as an Assistant Commissioner for Finance in the United States, 1917–1918, Treasury Representative at the Ministry of Transport, 1919–1921, a member of Weir Committee on Electricity which led to the establishment of the National Grid, and Chairman of the Telegraph Committee of Enquiry. He also headed Air Missions to Canada in 1938, and to Australia and New Zealand in 1939.

He was knighted as Knight Commander of the Order of the Bath (KCB) in 1917 and created a baronet in the 1920 New Year Honours. He was also awarded the Legion of Honour and the Order of the Crown of Italy.

He is buried with his wife, Edythe, in the churchyard of St Mary's, Kings Worthy, Winchester, Hampshire.

== Footnotes ==
Government offices
Preceded by Thomas McKinnon Wood	Financial Secretary to the Treasury; 1916–1919	Succeeded by Stanley Baldwin
Baronetage of the United Kingdom
New creation	Baronet (of Allerton); 1920–1947	Extinct
