= Montolieu Oliphant-Murray, 1st Viscount Elibank =

British nobleman

Commander Montolieu Fox Oliphant Murray, 1st Viscount Elibank, DL, JP (27 April 1840 – 20 February 1927) was a British nobleman.

The eldest son of Alexander Oliphant-Murray, 9th Lord Elibank and Emily Montgomery, he was educated privately and entered the Royal Navy in 1854. In 1860 he served in the Second Opium War aboard HMS Cambrian (receiving the 2nd China War Medal and Taku clasp). He later served in the corvette HMS Wolverine during the Jamaica Rebellion of 1865. He retired in 1870 with the rank of Commander.

He succeeded his father as 10th Lord Elibank in 1871. He was Deputy Lord Lieutenant of Peeblesshire in the 1880s, before becoming Lord Lieutenant of Peeblesshire from 1896 to 1908. In 1911 he was created 1st Viscount Elibank. He also served as a Justice of the Peace. He was described by his younger son as a "staunch Conservative".

== Family ==
In 1868 he married Blanche Alice Scott, daughter of Dr. Edward John Scott. The couple had four sons – including Alexander William Charles Oliphant Murray (1870–1920), Gideon Oliphant-Murray (1877–1951), who succeeded his father as 2nd Viscount Elibank, and Arthur Cecil Murray (1879–1962), who succeeded his brother as 3rd Viscount Elibank – and five daughters. His eldest son, Alexander was created Baron Murray of Elibank in 1912, but predeceased his father with no children. The Viscountcy and other titles passed to his younger son.

Honorary titles
Preceded by Colin James Mackenzie	Lord Lieutenant of Peeblesshire; 1896–1908	Succeeded by The Lord Glenconnor
Peerage of the United Kingdom
New creation	Viscount Elibank; 1911–1927	Succeeded by Gideon Oliphant-Murray
Peerage of Scotland
Preceded by Alexander Oliphant-Murray	Lord Elibank; 1871–1927	Succeeded by Gideon Oliphant-Murray
