= John Wilson (Glasgow St Rollox MP) =

Scottish politician

John Wilson, DL (1837 – 5 January 1928) was a Liberal Unionist Party politician in Scotland. He was Member of Parliament (MP) for Glasgow St. Rollox from 1900 to 1906.

He was a deputy lieutenant of Stirlingshire from 17 March 1902.

Parliament of the United Kingdom
Preceded by Ferdinand Faithfull Begg	Member of Parliament for Glasgow St. Rollox; 1900–1906	Succeeded by Thomas McKinnon Wood
