= Arthur Murray, 3rd Viscount Elibank =

British politician

- Born: Arthur Cecil Murray; 27 March 1879
- Died: 5 December 1962 (aged 83)
- Military career
- Rank: Lieutenant-Colonel

Lieutenant-Colonel Arthur Cecil Murray, 3rd Viscount Elibank, CMG, DSO (27 March 1879 – 5 December 1962) was a British army officer and politician.

== Early life and education ==
Murray was the fourth son of (1st) Viscount Elibank of Selkirkshire and his wife Blanche Alice née Scott of Portsea, Portsmouth, Hampshire. The family moved to Dresden in Germany in 1886, and he received his early education in the city. He was a student for at least some time at Sunningdale School in Berkshire.

== Career ==
He entered the Royal Military College Sandhurst and was commissioned as a second lieutenant in the Indian Staff Corps on 20 July 1898. In the same year he became Aide-de-Camp to the Lieutenant Governor of Bengal, Sir John Woodburn. He served as part of the international force that intervened to suppress the Boxer Rebellion in China in 1900 and commanded a Mounted Infantry Company, protecting the Sinho-Shanhaikwan Railway. He subsequently served on the North-West Frontier and in Chitral. In 1907 he was promoted to captain in the 5th Gurkha Rifles (Frontier Force).

In March 1908 John William Crombie the member of parliament for Kincardineshire died, and Murray was selected by the Liberal Party to contest the resulting by-election. He won the seat, and remained MP for Kincardineshire and its successor constituency, Kincardine and Aberdeenshire West, until 1923. From 1910 until the outbreak of war in 1914 he was Parliamentary Private Secretary to Sir Edward Grey, Secretary of State for Foreign Affairs.

He served in World War I in France and Belgium from 1914 to 1916 with the 2nd King Edward's Horse, was mentioned in despatches and awarded the Distinguished Service Order in 1916. He was Assistant Military Attaché in Washington from 1917 to 1918, and was awarded the CMG in 1919. Although a member of the Liberal Party which formed part of the coalition government, Murray became a stern critic of the policies pursued by the Prime Minister, David Lloyd George. He lost his seat at the 1923 general election.

Following the loss of his Commons seat he continued to take an active interest in politics, in particular foreign policy, and wrote a number of books and pamphlets on the subject. He became a director of the London and North Eastern Railway from 1923 to 1948 and of Wembley Stadium. When the Liberal Party split over support for the National Government in 1931, Murray initially remained with the main section of the party in opposition, but joined the National Liberals in 1936.

== Later life and death ==
In 1945 Murray published a political memoir, Master and Brother: Murrays of Elibank.

In 1951 he succeeded to two titles: the Viscountcy of Elibank and the Lordship Elibank of Ettrick Forest, following the death of his elder brothers. He was a Member of the Royal Company of Archers. In 1931 he married the actress Faith Celli. The couple had no children, and she died in 1942.

He died in December 1962. On his death, the title of Lord Elibank and the baronetcy passed to his kinsman James A. F. C. Erskine-Murray (great grandson of the seventh Lord Elibank), the Viscountcy becoming extinct.

Parliament of the United Kingdom
Preceded by John William Crombie	Member of Parliament for Kincardineshire; 1908–1918	Constituency abolished
New constituency	Member of Parliament for Kincardine & Western Aberdeenshire; 1918–1923	Succeeded by Malcolm Barclay-Harvey
Peerage of Scotland
Preceded by Gideon Oliphant-Murray	Lord Elibank; 1951–1962	Succeeded by James Erskine-Murray
Peerage of the United Kingdom
Preceded by Gideon Oliphant-Murray	Viscount Elibank; 1951–1962	Extinct
