= James Stewart (Labour politician) =

James Stewart (1863 – 17 March 1931) was a Scottish Labour Party politician.

He was elected at the 1922 general election as member of parliament (MP) for Glasgow St. Rollox constituency, having contested the seat unsuccessfully at the 1918 general election. He held the seat until his death in 1931 at the age of 67, having served as Parliamentary Under-Secretary for Health for Scotland in the 1924 Labour government.

On his election in 1923, The Times described him as having started life as a hairdresser at the age of 14, now having two businesses in Glasgow, having been associated with municipal life in Glasgow for a number of years, and being a member of the Town Council.

Parliament of the United Kingdom
| Preceded by Master of Elibank | Member of Parliament for Glasgow St. Rollox; 1922–1931 | Succeeded by William Leonard |
