= William Leonard (Scottish politician) =

British politician (1887–1969)

William Leonard (14 February 1887 – 14 October 1969) was a Labour and Co-operative politician in Scotland. He served as the member of parliament for Glasgow St. Rollox from 1931 to 1950.

The St. Rollox constituency was abolished for the 1950 general election. He contested the new Glasgow Woodside constituency, where he lost by 1,109 votes to the Unionist Party candidate. He did not stand in 1951.

Trade union offices
Preceded by Tom Wilson	President of the Scottish Trades Union Congress; 1925	Succeeded by Joseph Forbes Duncan
Preceded by Charles Gallie	President of the Scottish Trades Union Congress; 1932	Succeeded by James Crawford
Parliament of the United Kingdom
Preceded by James Stewart	Member of Parliament for Glasgow St. Rollox; 1931–1950	Constituency abolished
