= John McCulloch (MP) =

John McCulloch (1842–1912) was a Scottish land valuer and a Liberal politician.

McCulloch was the son of John McCulloch, of Killiamore, Wigtownshire and his wife Margaret Mitchell of Carsphairn, Kirkcudbright. He was educated at a parochial school and became a land valuer. He was an inspector for Dundee mortgage and land companies in America and then director of Peter Lawson & Son (Limited). He was a medallist of the Highland Society and a vice-president of Scottish Chamber of Agriculture.

At the 1885 general election, McCulloch was elected as the member of parliament (MP) for Glasgow St. Rollox, but he did not stand for the seat in 1886.

Parliament of the United Kingdom
New constituency (see Glasgow	Member of Parliament for Glasgow St. Rollox; 1885 – 1886	Succeeded by James Caldwell
