= 1931 Glasgow St Rollox by-election =

UK parliamentary by-election

The 1931 Glasgow St Rollox by-election was held on 7 May 1931 due to the death of the incumbent Labour MP, James Stewart. It was retained by the Labour candidate William Leonard.

By-election, May 1931: Glasgow St Rollox
Party	Candidate	Votes	%	±%
Labour Co-op	William Leonard	10,044	45.2	−16.6
Unionist	J.A. Kennedy	8,662	39.0	+2.7
National (Scotland)	Elma Campbell	3,521	15.8	New
Majority		1,382	6.2	−19.2
Turnout		22,227	54.1	−17.9
Labour Co-op hold		Swing	-9.6	
