= Ferdinand Begg =

Scottish stockbroker and politician (1847-1926)

Ferdinand Faithfull Begg FRSE (middle name sometimes spelt Faithful; 27 December 1847 in Edinburgh – 4 December 1926 in Hove, Sussex) was a Scottish stockbroker and Unionist politician. He served as Chairman of the Edinburgh Stock Exchange (1885–87) and Chairman of the London Chamber of Commerce (1912–15).

He was Senior Partner of Faithfull Begg & Co Stockbrokers in London (1887–1913).

He was Member of Parliament for Glasgow St Rollox from 17 July 1895, to 4 October 1900.

== Private life ==
He was born in Edinburgh the son of Rev James Begg DD and Maria Faithful. He was privately educated.

In 1873 he married Jessie Maria Cargill (d.1925). They had several children, including Francis Cargill Begg, Maria Faithfull Palmer, Jessie Begg, Elizabeth Begg and James Begg.

He died in Hove, Sussex.

Parliament of the United Kingdom
Preceded by Sir James Carmichael, 3rd Baronet	Member of Parliament for Glasgow St Rollox; 1895–1900	Succeeded by John Wilson
