= James Caldwell (British politician) =

Scottish businessman and politician (1839–1925)

James Caldwell PC
- James Caldwell

Personal details
- Born: 1839
- Died: 1925 (aged 85–86)
- Party: Liberal Unionist (1886–c.1890s), later Liberal
- Education: University of Glasgow
- Occupation: Lawyer, businessman (calico printing)

James Caldwell, PC (1839–1925) was a Scottish businessman and politician. He served as an MP for two constituencies, both in Glasgow.

The son of Findley Caldwell, a "working man", James Caldwell worked in a lawyer's office before attending law classes at Glasgow University and began business as a lawyer. He then joined a firm of calico printers, where he remained for nearly 20 years. He was a member of the Royal Faculty of Procurators in Glasgow.

He was first elected for Glasgow St Rollox in 1886 as a Liberal Unionist. During his term he went over to the Liberals, and in 1892 he stood for re-election not in his own constituency but in Glasgow Tradeston, where he was narrowly defeated.

He was then elected as Liberal MP for Mid-Lanarkshire at a by-election in 1894, where he served until January 1910, when he stood down. An acknowledged expert in parliamentary procedure, he was Deputy Chairman Ways and Means and Deputy Speaker of the House of Commons from 1906 until 1910. He was sworn of the Privy Council in 1910.

Caldwell took an interest in development issues in the Highlands and Islands. In the spring of 1889, he undertook a trip to mainland Ross-shire and Lewis to gather information on obstacles to the development of the West Coast fishing industry. On the journey from Inverness to Ullapool, he was accompanied by Murdoch Paterson, chief engineer of the Highland Railway Company.

Parliament of the United Kingdom
Preceded by John McCulloch	Member of Parliament for Glasgow St Rollox; 1886–1892	Succeeded by Sir James Carmichael, Bt
Preceded by John Philipps	Member of Parliament for Mid Lanarkshire; 1894–January 1910	Succeeded by John Howard Whitehouse
