= Sir James Carmichael, 3rd Baronet =

Sir James Morse Carmichael, 3rd Baronet (20 July 1844 – 31 May 1902) was a Scottish civil servant and Liberal politician.

== Background ==
He was the only son of Sir James Carmichael, 2nd Baronet and his wife Louisa Charlotte Butler, daughter of Sir Thomas Butler, 8th Baronet. Carmichael was educated at Radley College. In 1883, he succeeded his father as baronet and 26th Chief of the Name and Arms of Carmichael. He claimed the dormant title Earl of Hyndford, however was rejected.

== Career ==
Carmichael was appointed a Clerk in Admiralty in 1862, a post he held until 1880. He was attached to Sir William Hutt in 1864 and became private secretary to John Bright in 1873. Between 1882 and 1885 he served in same capacity to the Chancellor of the Exchequer Hugh Childers and subsequently to the prime minister William Ewart Gladstone until 1886.

Carmichael contested Northamptonshire North unsuccessfully in 1885, and Northamptonshire South one year later. He entered the British House of Commons in 1892, sitting as Member of Parliament (MP) for Glasgow St Rollox until 1895.

He died at his residence in Westminster on 31 May 1902 aged 57 and unmarried. With his death the baronetcy became extinct.

Parliament of the United Kingdom
Preceded by James Caldwell	Member of Parliament for Glasgow St Rollox; 1892 – 1895	Succeeded by Ferdinand Faithfull Begg
Baronetage of the United Kingdom
Preceded by James Carmichael	Baronet (of Nutwood); 1883–1902	Extinct
