= Thomas McKinnon Wood =

British Liberal politician (1855–1927)

The Right Honourable Thomas McKinnon Wood
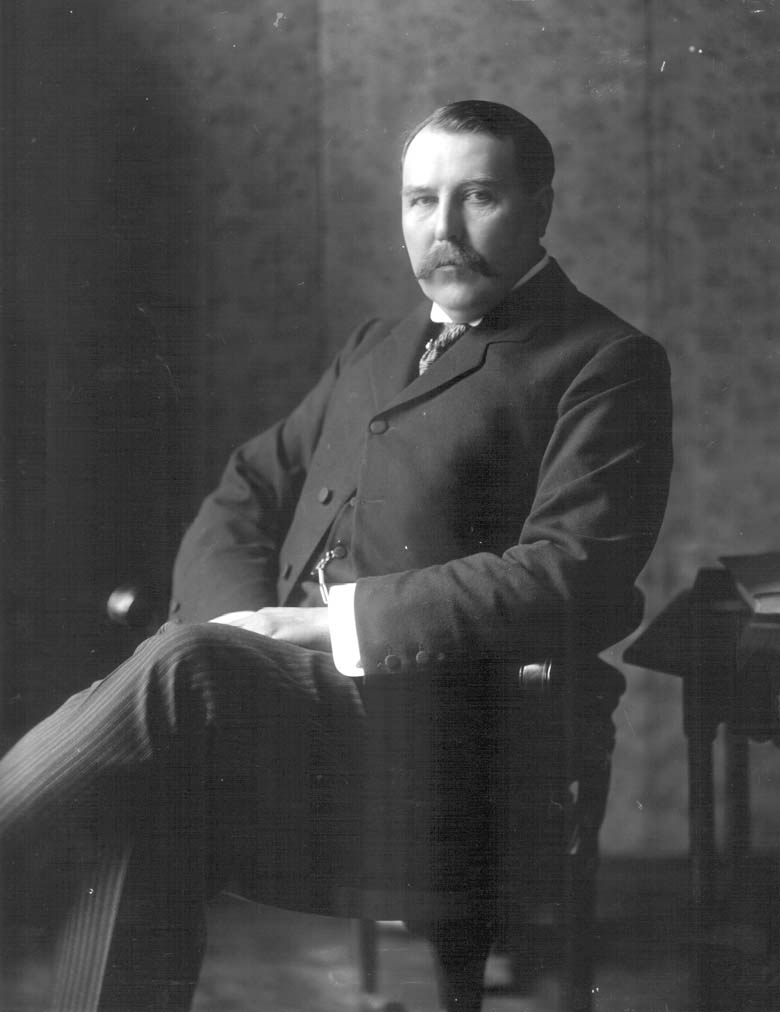

Financial Secretary to the Treasury
- In office 23 October 1911 – 13 February 1912
- Monarch: George V
- Prime Minister: H. H. Asquith
- Preceded by: Charles Hobhouse
- Succeeded by: Charles Masterman
- In office 9 July 1916 – 5 December 1916
- Monarch: George V
- Prime Minister: H. H. Asquith
- Preceded by: Edwin Montagu
- Succeeded by: Sir Hardman Lever, Bt

Secretary for Scotland
- In office 13 February 1912 – 9 July 1916
- Monarch: George V
- Prime Minister: H. H. Asquith
- Preceded by: The Lord Pentland
- Succeeded by: Harold Tennant

Chancellor of the Duchy of Lancaster
- In office 9 July 1916 – 5 December 1916
- Monarch: George V
- Prime Minister: H. H. Asquith
- Preceded by: Edwin Montagu
- Succeeded by: Sir Frederick Cawley, Bt

Personal details
- Born: 26 January 1855 London
- Died: 26 March 1927 (aged 72)
- Party: Liberal
- Spouse: Isabella Sandison
- Education: University College, London

Thomas McKinnon Wood PC (26 January 1855 – 26 March 1927) was a British Liberal politician. A supporter of social reform who was regarded as having "sound Progressive credentials," he served as a member of H. H. Asquith's cabinet as Secretary of State for Scotland between 1912 and 1916 and as Financial Secretary to the Treasury and Chancellor of the Duchy of Lancaster between July and December 1916. He was also involved in London politics and served as Chairman of the London County Council between 1898 and 1899.

== Background and education ==
Born in Stepney, Wood was the only son of Hugh Wood, a merchant and shipowner, by his second wife Jessie McKinnon, daughter of Reverend Thomas McKinnon. His father had been born in Orkney, where his father was a farmer, but had later settled in London. Wood was educated at the Brewers' Company School, Aldenham, Hertfordshire, Mill Hill School, and University College, London. He graduated in 1875 with honours in logic and moral philosophy. After graduating, he worked briefly on the 9th edition of the Encyclopædia Britannica, before joining the family business in 1878, after his father lost his sight. Although "McKinnon" was officially his middle name, as an adult he generally used "McKinnon Wood" as a double-barrelled surname.

== Political career ==
McKinnon Wood was a member of the London County Council for Central Hackney from 1892 to 1909. From 1897 to 1908 he was leader of the Progressive Party and also served as chairman of the council from 1898 to 1899. In 1907 he was appointed alderman, a post he held until 1909. He was appointed a Deputy Lieutenant for the County of London in 1899.

McKinnon Wood stood unsuccessfully as a parliamentary candidate for East Islington in 1895, Glasgow St. Rollox in 1900 and Orkney and Shetland in 1902. However, in 1906 he was elected for Glasgow St Rollox as a Liberal, a seat he held until 1918. In April 1908 McKinnon Wood was appointed Parliamentary Secretary to the Board of Education in the administration of H. H. Asquith, a post he held until October of the same year, when he became Under-Secretary of State for Foreign Affairs.

In 1911 he was made Financial Secretary to the Treasury and admitted to the Privy Council. The following year he was promoted to Secretary for Scotland with a seat in the cabinet. He continued in this post also when the war-time coalition was formed in May 1915. His integrity was called into question over the 1908 -1919 Oscar Slater case and inquiries into his false conviction for murder. In July 1916 he was appointed Chancellor of the Duchy of Lancaster and Financial Secretary to the Treasury. The latter post was considered very important in the war-time situation, and was not seen as a demotion.

However, when Lloyd George became prime minister in December 1916, McKinnon Wood was not offered a post in the government. By the time the general election of December 1918 was held, McKinnon Wood was an anti-coalition Asquith Liberal. In common with most of the Liberals who did not receive the "Coalition Coupon" he lost his seat, which was gained by Gideon Oliphant-Murray of the Conservative Party. He made one attempt to re-enter the Commons when he stood unsuccessfully for Hackney Central in 1922.

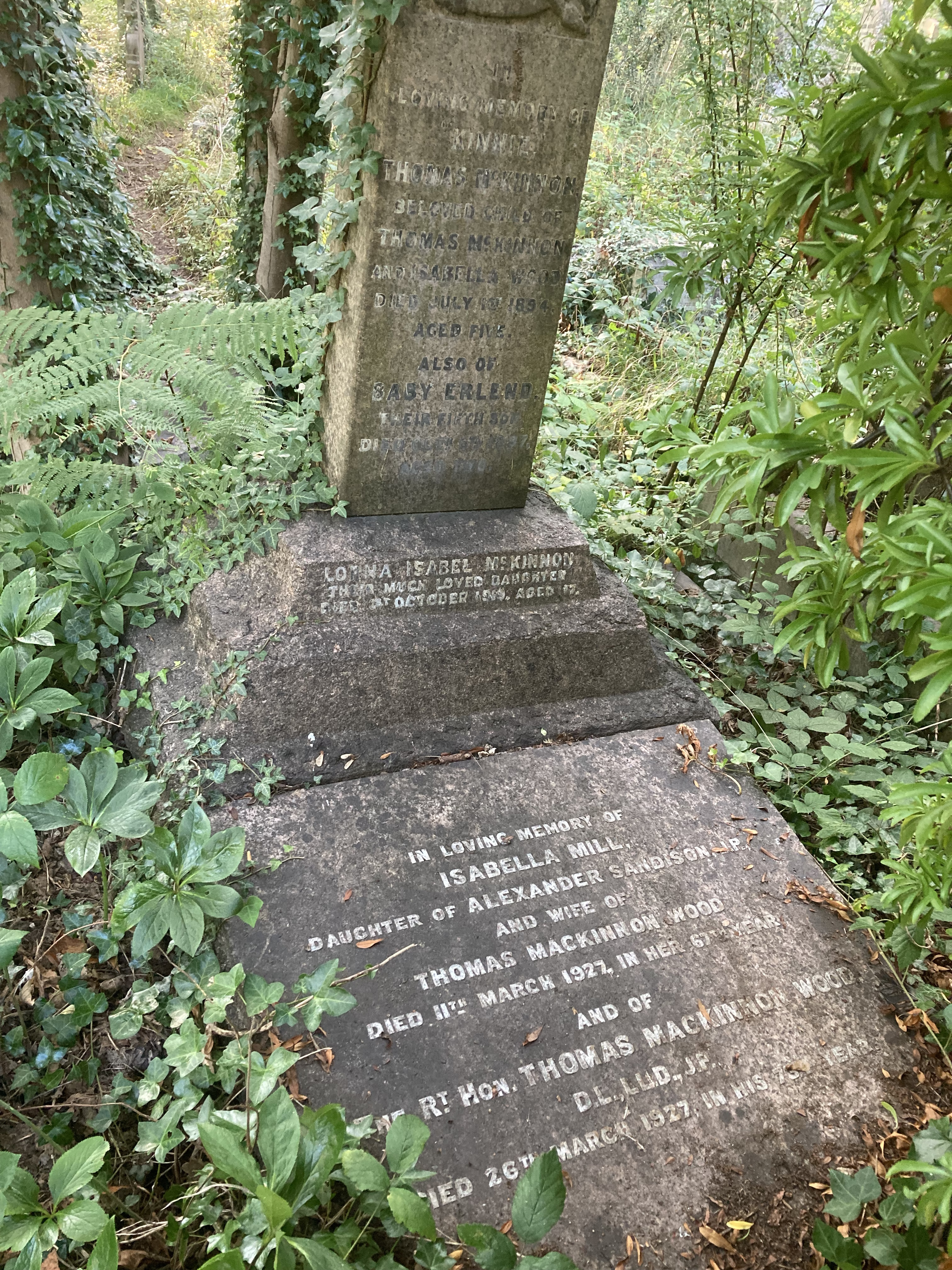
Family vault of Thomas MacKinnon Wood in Highgate Cemetery

== Family ==
McKinnon Wood married Isabella Sandison, daughter of Alexander Sandison, in 1883. They had eight children, six sons and two daughters. Two sons and one daughter predeceased him. McKinnon Wood died in South Kensington two weeks after his wife in March 1927, aged 72. Following a funeral service at Whitefield's Tabernacle, Tottenham Court Road, McKinnon Wood was buried in a family vault on the eastern side of Highgate Cemetery (plot no.31039), opposite the grave of George Eliot. He left an estate valued at £130,372.

Parliament of the United Kingdom
Preceded by John Wilson	Member of Parliament for Glasgow St Rollox; 1906–1918	Succeeded by Gideon Oliphant-Murray
Political offices
Preceded by William Job Collins	Chairman of the London County Council; 1898–1899	Succeeded by The Lord Welby
Preceded by Thomas Lough	Parliamentary Secretary to the Board of Education; 1908	Succeeded by Charles Trevelyan
Preceded by Lord Edmond FitzMaurice	Under-Secretary of State for Foreign Affairs; 1908–1911	Succeeded by Francis Dyke Acland
Preceded by Charles Hobhouse	Financial Secretary to the Treasury; 1911–1912	Succeeded by Charles Masterman
Preceded by The Lord Pentland	Secretary for Scotland; 1912–1916	Succeeded by Harold Tennant
Preceded by Edwin Montagu	Chancellor of the Duchy of Lancaster; July–December 1916	Succeeded by Frederick Cawley
Preceded by Edwin Montagu	Financial Secretary to the Treasury; July–December 1916	Succeeded by Hardman Lever
Party political offices
Preceded by Charles Harrison	Leader of the Progressive Party; 1898–1908	Succeeded by John Benn
