= Gideon Oliphant-Murray, 2nd Viscount Elibank =

Scottish colonial administrator

Gideon Oliphant-Murray, 2nd Viscount Elibank (7 August 1877 – 12 March 1951) was a Scottish colonial administrator, politician and nobleman.

He was the third son of 1st Viscount Elibank of Selkirkshire and his wife Blanche Alice née Scott of Portsea, Portsmouth, Hampshire. The family moved to Dresden in Germany in 1886, and he received his early education in the city, before attending Blairbridge School in Scotland. On completing his education he took a job in a London bank, from which he resigned in 1897.

== Colonial administration ==
In 1898 he left the United Kingdom to begin a career as a colonial administrator when he became private secretary to George Le Hunte, Lieutenant-Governor of British New Guinea. Two years later he was created a resident magistrate in the Western Division of the colony, and in 1901 was appointed acting commandant of the Armed Native Constabulary.

Later that year he moved to South Africa where the Second Boer War was entering its closing stages. He initially acted as private secretary to the Commissioner for Native Affairs, Transvaal. In 1902 he became Assistant Native Commissioner, Zoutpansberg in the Northern Transvaal. He resigned his post in 1906, returning to Britain. In the following year he was appointed assistant private secretary to Francis Hopwood, Under-Secretary of State for the Colonies. In that capacity he attended the 1907 Colonial Conference.

In 1909 he was appointed administrator of St Vincent, becoming Commissioner of Saint Lucia in 1915 and Acting Governor of the Windward Islands in 1916. He retired in 1917.

== Politics ==
Oliphant-Murray returned to Scotland at the height of the First World War taking up the post of Food Commissioner for Glasgow and the Western Counties of Scotland. When a general election was held at the end of 1918, he was elected as Unionist Member of Parliament for Glasgow St Rollox. A staunch supporter of Ulster Unionism, he broke with the coalition government led by David Lloyd George in February 1922 over its Irish policy, and did not defend his seat at the general election in November of that year.

As the oldest surviving son, he succeeded his father as Viscount Elibank and Lord Elibank in 1927. He was an active member of the House of Lords, and an enthusiastic supporter of the United Empire Party established by Lord Beaverbrook. He was also a frequent speaker on colonial matters in the house, criticising the governments of Canada and New Zealand and opposing the increased autonomy granted under the Government of India Act 1935. He was also a severe critic of the Labour Government that came to power in 1945.

In 1934 he was appointed Lord Lieutenant of Peeblesshire, holding the position until 1945. He was also Honorary Colonel of the 8th Battalion The Royal Scots from 1939 to 1945. He held a number of business appointments, and was an Honorary Member of the Royal Company of Archers. He wrote his autobiography, A Man's Life in 1934.

== Marriage to Ermine Aspinwall ==
In 1908 he married Ermine M. K. Aspinwall of Denbighshire. It was her second marriage, having been widowed by Colonel James Aspinall some ten years earlier. Her maternal grandfather was Robert Napier, 1st Baron Napier of Magdala. In 1925 Gideon commissioned a portrait of Ermine by Philip de László which hung in their London house in Pelham Place. The couple had no children. Ermine was heavily involved in 'good causes', supporting her husband with his colonial and business interests. A tireless worker on committees and social gatherings, much of which is recorded in the biography of her friend Dorothy Dalrymple. The couple moved to South Africa in August 1950, and he died in Cape Town in March 1951, aged 73. Ermine returned to England and took up residence in Mayfair at the Lansdowne Club close to Berkeley Square where she died in 1955 aged 76. He was succeeded in the viscountcy by his younger brother, Arthur Cecil Murray.

== Family homes ==
The Elbanks spent their time between London and Scotland. Black Barony in the Scottish Borders, had passed to the family in 1771, and extended in the 18th century, resulting in the present facade. The Murrays of Elibank, retained ownership until 1930. In London they had an apartment in St James' Court in Buckingham Gate (now St James' Court, a hotel), then a town house at 23 Pelham Place Kensington, before moving to Sloane Gardens, and finally taking an apartment in Arlington Street after the war, before moving to South Africa in 1950. After Gideon's death some six months later at the Belmond Mount Nelson Hotel in Cape Town South Africa she returned to England and took residency in the Lansdowne Club.

== Images ==
- (Charles) Gideon Murray, 2nd Viscount Elibank
- Ermine Mary Katherine Murray (née Madocks), Viscountess Elibank, 1921 & 1930, by Bassano Ltd, National Portrait Gallery, 1925 Portrait by Philip de László

Government offices
Preceded by William Douglas Young	Commissioner of Saint Lucia; 1915–1918	Succeeded by Wilfred Bennett Davidson-Houston
Parliament of the United Kingdom
Preceded by Thomas McKinnon Wood	Member of Parliament for Glasgow St. Rollox; 1918–1922	Succeeded by James Stewart
Peerage of the United Kingdom
Preceded by Montolieu Fox Oliphant-Murray	Viscount Elibank; 1927–1951	Succeeded by Arthur Cecil Murray
