= Glasgow St Rollox =

Parliamentary constituency in the United Kingdom, 1885–1950

- Former burgh constituency for the House of Commons
- Subdivisions of Scotland: City and royal burgh of Glasgow; County of city of Glasgow

1885–1950
- Seats: One
- Created from: Glasgow
- Replaced by: Glasgow Springburn and Glasgow Woodside

Glasgow St. Rollox was a burgh constituency represented in the House of Commons of the Parliament of the United Kingdom from 1885 until 1950. It elected one Member of Parliament (MP) using the first-past-the-post voting system.

The constituency covered Glasgow's Cowcaddens and Woodside wards. In 1950, the constituency was extended to include North Kelvin ward, and the name was changed to Glasgow Woodside.

It is referenced in Franz Ferdinand's song "The Fallen" as an area where the protagonist of the story spends much of his time.

== Boundaries ==
The Redistribution of Seats Act 1885 provided that the constituency was to consist of the Fifth Municipal Ward, and the Third Municipal Ward, except so much as is comprised in the Camlachie Division.

In 1918 the constituency consisted of "That portion of the city which is bounded by a line commencing at a point at the intersection of Springburn Road and Parliamentary Road, thence south-westward along the centre line of Parliamentary Road to the centre line of Buchanan Street, thence northward along the centre line of Buchanan Street to the centre line of Cowcaddens, thence northwestward along the centre line of Cowcaddens, New City Road and Great Western Road to the centre line of the River Kelvin, thence northward along the centre line of the River Kelvin to the centre line of Belmont Street, thence northeastward along the centre line of Belmont Street to the centre line of Carlton Gardens, thence eastward along the centre line of Carlton Gardens and Raeberry Street to the centre line of New City Road, thence north-eastward along the centre line of Well Road and continuation thereof to the centre line of the Forth and Clyde Canal, thence south-eastward along the centre line of the Forth and Clyde Canal to the centre line of Possil Road, thence north-eastward along the centre line of Possil Road to the centre line of Saracen Street, thence eastward and north-eastward along the centre line of Keppochhill Road to the centre of the North British Railway (Edinburgh and Glasgow Line), thence south-westward along the centre line of the said North British Railway to the centre line of Fountainwell Road, thence south-eastward along the centre line of Fountainwell Road to the centre line of Springburn Road, thence southward along the centre line of Springburn Road to the point of commencement."

== Members of Parliament ==
Election	Member	Party
1885	John McCulloch	Liberal
1886	James Caldwell	Liberal Unionist Party
1892	Sir James Morse Carmichael	Liberal
1895	Ferdinand Faithfull Begg	Conservative
1900	John Wilson	Liberal Unionist Party
1906	Thomas McKinnon Wood	Liberal
1918	Master of Elibank	Coalition Unionist
1922	James Stewart	Labour
1931	William Leonard	Labour Co-operative
1950	constituency abolished	

== Election results ==
=== Elections in the 1880s ===
General election 1885: St Rollox
Party	Candidate	Votes	%	±%
Liberal	John McCulloch	4,950	50.64	
Conservative	John Neilson Cuthbertson	4,824	49.36	
Majority		126	1.28	
Turnout		9,774	81.96	
Registered electors		11,926		
Liberal win (new seat)				

James Caldwell

General election 1886: St Rollox
Party	Candidate	Votes	%	±%
Liberal Unionist	James Caldwell	4,788	50.62	+1.26
Liberal	Peter Stuart MacLiver	4,669	49.37	−1.27
Majority		119	1.25	N/A
Turnout		9,457	79.30	−2.66
Registered electors		11,926		
Liberal Unionist gain from Liberal		Swing	+1.27	

=== Elections in the 1890s ===
General election 1892: St Rollox
Party	Candidate	Votes	%	±%
Liberal	James Carmichael	6,247	56.09	+6.72
Liberal Unionist	Hugh Elliot	4,891	43.91	−6.71
Majority		1,356	12.18	N/A
Turnout		11,138	80.80	+1.50
Registered electors		13,785		
Liberal gain from Liberal Unionist		Swing	+6.71	

General election 1895: St Rollox
Party	Candidate	Votes	%	±%
Conservative	Ferdinand Begg	4,561	49.76	+5.85
Liberal	James Carmichael	4,200	45.82	−10.27
Ind. Labour Party	John Evans Woolacott	405	4.42	New
Majority		361	3.94	N/A
Turnout		9,166	62.25	−18.55
Registered electors		14,724		
Conservative gain from Liberal		Swing	+8.06	

=== Elections in the 1900s ===
General election 1900: St Rollox
Party	Candidate	Votes	%	±%
Liberal Unionist	John Wilson	6,232	50.75	+0.99
Liberal	Thomas McKinnon Wood	6,049	49.25	+3.43
Majority		183	1.50	−2.44
Turnout		12,281	72.69	+10.44
Registered electors		16,896		
Liberal Unionist hold		Swing	−1.22	

McKinnon Wood

General election 1906: St Rollox
Party	Candidate	Votes	%	±%
Liberal	Thomas McKinnon Wood	9,453	60.98	+11.73
Liberal Unionist	John Wilson	6,048	39.02	−11.73
Majority		3,405	21.96	N/A
Turnout		15,501	80.28	+7.59
Registered electors		19,309		
Liberal gain from Liberal Unionist		Swing	+11.73	

=== Elections in the 1910s ===
General election January 1910: St Rollox
Party	Candidate	Votes	%	±%
Liberal	Thomas McKinnon Wood	10,019	59.50	−1.48
Liberal Unionist	Arthur Robert Chamberlayne	6,821	40.50	+1.48
Majority		3,198	19.00	−2.96
Turnout		16,840	86.00	+5.72
Registered electors		19,581		
Liberal hold		Swing	−1.48	

General election December 1910: St Rollox
Party	Candidate	Votes	%	±%
Liberal	Thomas McKinnon Wood	9,291	55.75	−3.75
Liberal Unionist	Arthur Robert Chamberlayne	7,374	44.25	+3.75
Majority		1,917	11.50	−7.50
Turnout		16,665	83.67	−2.33
Registered electors		19,918		
Liberal hold		Swing	−3.75	

1912 Glasgow St Rollox by-election
Party	Candidate	Votes	%	±%
Liberal	Thomas McKinnon Wood	8,530	51.41	−4.34
Liberal Unionist	Frederick Alexander Macquisten	8,061	48.59	+4.34
Majority		469	2.82	−8.68
Turnout		16,591	82.63	−1.04
Registered electors		20,079		
Liberal hold		Swing	−4.34	

General election 1918: St Rollox
Party		Candidate	Votes	%	±%
C	Unionist	Gideon Oliphant-Murray	10,844	58.58	+14.33
	Labour	James Stewart	6,147	33.21	New
	Liberal	Thomas McKinnon Wood	1,521	8.22	−47.53
Majority			4,697	25.37	N/A
Turnout			18,512	48.16	−35.51
Registered electors			38,439		
	Unionist gain from Liberal		Swing		
C indicates candidate endorsed by the coalition government.

=== Elections in the 1920s ===
General election 1922: Glasgow St Rollox
Party	Candidate	Votes	%	±%
Labour	James Stewart	16,114	56.58	+23.37
Unionist	James Brown Couper	10,343	36.31	−22.27
Liberal	John Arnold Fleming	2,025	7.11	−1.11
Majority		5,771	20.27	N/A
Turnout		28,482	76.68	+28.52
Registered electors		37,145		
Labour gain from Unionist		Swing	+22.82	

General election 1923: Glasgow St Rollox
Party	Candidate	Votes	%	±%
Labour	James Stewart	15,240	62.35	+5.77
Unionist	Violet Mary Craig Roberton	9,204	37.65	+1.34
Majority		6,036	24.70	+4.43
Turnout		24,444	65.64	−11.04
Registered electors		37,238		
Labour hold		Swing	+6.45	

General election 1924: Glasgow St Rollox
Party	Candidate	Votes	%	±%
Labour	James Stewart	16,299	59.19	−3.16
Liberal	James Johnston	11,238	40.81	+3.16
Majority		5,061	18.38	−6.32
Turnout		27,537	74.31	+8.67
Registered electors		37,059		
Labour hold		Swing	−3.16	

General election 1929: Glasgow St. Rollox
Party	Candidate	Votes	%	±%
Labour	James Stewart	19,445	61.75	+2.56
Unionist	A.N. Forman	11,430	36.30	New
Communist	George Middleton	613	1.95	New
Majority		8,015	25.45	+7.07
Turnout		31,488	71.99	−2.32
Registered electors		43,742		
Labour hold		Swing		

=== Elections in the 1930s ===
1931 Glasgow St Rollox by-election
Party	Candidate	Votes	%	±%
Labour Co-op	William Leonard	10,044	45.19	−16.56
Unionist	J.A. Kennedy	8,662	38.97	+2.67
National (Scotland)	Elma Campbell	3,521	15.84	New
Majority		1,382	6.22	−19.23
Turnout		22,227	54.06	−17.93
Registered electors		41,112		
Labour Co-op hold		Swing	−9.62	

General election 1931: Glasgow St Rollox
Party	Candidate	Votes	%	±%
Labour Co-op	William Leonard	13,545	44.70	−17.05
Unionist	Fred Shoesmith	12,734	42.03	+5.73
National (Scotland)	Elma Campbell	4,021	13.27	N/A
Majority		811	2.67	−22.78
Turnout		30,300	74.16	+2.17
Registered electors		40,858		
Labour Co-op hold		Swing	−11.39	

General election 1935: Glasgow St Rollox
Party	Candidate	Votes	%	±%
Labour Co-op	William Leonard	16,708	61.61	+16.91
Unionist	H Black	10,411	38.39	−3.64
Majority		6,297	23.22	+20.55
Turnout		27,119	67.82	−6.34
Registered electors		39,986		
Labour Co-op hold		Swing	−10.28	

=== Elections in the 1940s ===
General election 1945: Glasgow St Rollox
Party	Candidate	Votes	%	±%
Labour Co-op	William Leonard	14,520	62.93	+1.32
Unionist	William Milligan	8,553	37.07	−1.32
Majority		5,967	25.86	+2.64
Turnout		23,073	61.13	−6.69
Registered electors		37,745		
Labour Co-op hold		Swing	+1.32	
