= 1919 Bothwell by-election =

UK Parliamentary by-election

- 16 July 1919 (Polling); 29 July 1919 (Declaration)
- Registered: 26,572
- Turnout: 71.9%
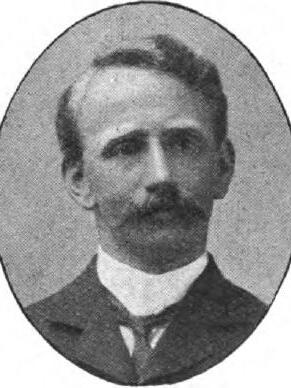
		Nat
Candidate	John Robertson	James Moffat
Party	Labour	National Liberal
Alliance		Coalition
Popular vote	13,135	5,967
Percentage	68.8%	31.2%
Swing	▲19.7%	New
MP before election
David MacDonald
Unionist
Subsequent MP
John Robertson
Labour

The 1919 Bothwell by-election was held on 16 July 1919. The by-election was held due to the death of the incumbent Unionist MP, David Macdonald. It was won by the Labour candidate John Robertson.

== Background ==
The seat of Bothwell had been contested for the first time at the December 1918 general election with the Unionist candidate Macdonald defeating the Labour candidate John Robertson by just 332 (1.8%) to win the seat as part of the Coalition Government's landside.

On 22 June, MacDonald died of a seizure at his residence in Uddingston, after a holiday to the Highlands.

== Candidates ==
=== Coalition Liberal ===
On 1 July, the Bothwell Division Unionist Association and the Local Liberal agreed to unanimously nominate Coalition Liberal James Moffat as the Coalition candidate.

- James Moffat, managing director of the Wemyss Coal Company, Provost of Hamilton since 1913.

=== Labour ===
- John Robertson, coal miner, candidate for North East Lanarkshire in 1904, 1906 & 1911 and for Bothwell in 1918

=== Irish Nationalists ===
Despite speculation of an Irish Nationalist candidate contesting the seat, none did so.

== Campaign ==
In the later stages of the campaign, the increasing price of coal was a primary issue discussed by the candidates.

== Result ==
Bothwell by-election, 1919
Party		Candidate	Votes	%	±%
	Labour	John Robertson	13,135	68.8	+19.7
C	National Liberal	James Moffat	5,967	31.2	New
Majority			7,168	37.6	N/A
Turnout			19,102	71.9	+2.7
Registered electors			26,572		
	Labour gain from Unionist		Swing		
C indicates candidate endorsed by the coalition government.

== Aftermath ==
Robertson successfully maintained his gain at the next general election.
