= Rattigan =

Origin
- Meaning: Deriving from the Old High German reht, meaning "justice"

Rattigan is a surname. It is an anglicised form of the Irish patronym Ó Reachtagáin, meaning "descendant of Reachtagán", whose name derives from the Old High German reht, meaning "justice". The name may vary as O'Raghtaghan, Raghtigan, Rhatigan, Ratigan, Rhategan, Ractigan, and Ratican.

== People with the surname ==
- Alf Rattigan (1911–2000), Australian public servant
- Benedict Rattigan (born 1965), British writer and philosopher
- Billie Rattigan (1932–2019), Irish footballer
- Colin Rattigan (born 1961), British Olympian
- Cyril Rattigan (1884–1916), British Army officer and cricketer
- Errol Rattigan (born 1956), Jamaican cricketer
- Sir Henry Adolphus Rattigan (1864–1920), British Chief Justice
- Joseph A. Rattigan (1920–2007), American politician and judge
- Leon Rattigan (born 1987), British wrestler
- Nick Rattigan (born 1992), American musician
- Sir Terence Rattigan (1911–1977), British playwright and screenwriter
- Thomas Rattigan (born 1937), American businessman
- Sir William Henry Rattigan (1842–1904), British politician and judge
- Yana Rattigan (born 1987), British wrestler

== See also ==
- Ratigan
