= 1911 North East Lanarkshire by-election =

UK parliamentary by-election

The 1911 North East Lanarkshire by-election was a Parliamentary by-election held on 9 March 1911. It returned one Member of Parliament (MP) to the House of Commons of the Parliament of the United Kingdom, elected by the first past the post voting system.

== Electoral history ==
General election Jan 1910: North East Lanarkshire
Party	Candidate	Votes	%	±%
Liberal	Thomas Fleming Wilson	9,105	49.8	+9.4
Conservative	James Robertson Wilson	7,012	38.4	+8.0
Labour	Joseph Sullivan	2,160	11.8	−17.4
Majority		2,093	11.4	+1.4
Turnout		18,277	83.8	+3.0
Liberal hold		Swing	+0.7	

General election December 1910: Electorate 22,554
Party	Candidate	Votes	%	±%
Liberal	Thomas Fleming Wilson	9,848	58.0	+8.2
Conservative	John Peers Boyd-Carpenter	7,142	42.0	+3.6
Majority		2,706	16.0	+4.6
Turnout		16,990	75.3	−8.5
Liberal hold		Swing	+2.3	

== Candidates ==
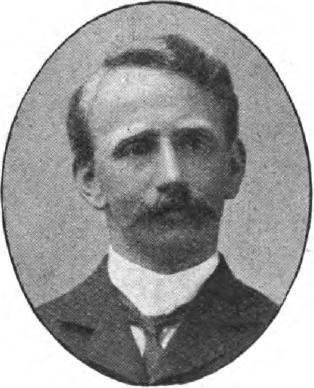
John Robertson

Although there had been no Labour candidate at the last election, there had been a Labour candidate in January 1910, who finished bottom of the poll. For this by-election, John Robertson was selected as the Labour candidate and was sponsored by the Scottish Miners' Federation. This was the first instance in the 1910-18 parliament in which Liberal and Labour candidates had opposed each other. Labour's intervention to contest this Liberal seat gave the Unionists a real hope of winning.

== Result ==
Duncan Millar

By-Election 9 March 1911: Electorate 28,759
Party	Candidate	Votes	%	±%
Liberal	James Duncan Millar	7,976	45.3	−12.7
Conservative	Park Goff	6,776	38.4	−3.6
Labour	John Robertson	2,879	16.3	New
Majority		1,200	6.9	−9.1
Turnout		17,631	78.2	+2.9
Liberal hold		Swing	-4.6	

Labour's share of the vote was well down on the share they achieved in this seat in both 1901 and 1904.

== Aftermath ==
A General Election was due to take place by the end of 1915. By the autumn of 1914, the following candidates had been adopted to contest that election. Due to the outbreak of war, the election never took place.

General Election 1914/15: Electorate
Party	Candidate	Votes	%	±%
Liberal	James Duncan Millar			
Labour	John Robertson			

Following boundary changes, most of the seat made up Bothwell for the 1918 general election. Millar moved on to contest neighbouring Motherwell where he was defeated. Goff went off to contest Cleveland where he was elected. Robertson remained to contest Bothwell:

General election 14 December 1918: Bothwell Electorate 26,572
Party	Candidate	Votes	%	±%
Unionist	David Macdonald	9,359	50.9	
Labour	John Robertson	9,027	49.1	
Majority		332	1.8	
Turnout		18,386		
Unionist win (new seat)				
