= Scottish Workers' Representation Committee =

- General Secretary: Robert Allan (1900–1902); George Carson (1902–1909)
- Founded: 1899
- Dissolved: 1909
- Merged into: Labour Party
- Trade Union Wing: Scottish Trades Union Congress
- Ideology: Big Tent Socialism
- Political position: Left-wing

Scottish Workers' Representation Committee was the parliamentary outfit of the Scottish Trades Union Congress from 1899 until 1909. It was known as the Scottish Workers Parliamentary Elections Committee until 1903. In contrast to the Labour Representation Committee (LRC) in England, SWRC was able to maintain organisational unity between different strands of ideological tendencies in Scotland, ranging from Marxist, Catholic and Fabian socialists.

== History ==
The SWPEC's first contest was the 1900 UK general election. It sponsored radical journalist A. E. Fletcher in Glasgow Camlachie. He received 3,107 votes and did not win the seat. It then stood Robert Smillie, a leader of the miners' trade union, at the 1901 North East Lanarkshire by-election, and was also defeated. When another by-election arose in North East Lanarkshire, in 1904, another miners' leader was selected, John Robertson, who again failed to win the seat.

At the 1906 general election, The SWRC stood five candidates: John Robertson in North East Lanarkshire, Joseph Sullivan in North West Lanarkshire, David Gilmour in Falkirk Burghs, James Brown in North Ayrshire, and Robert Smillie in Paisley. The candidates altogether won a total of 14,877 votes, but all failed to win a single seat.

Following this failure, the party decided to align itself more closely with the successor of the LRC, the Labour Party, and it took the name Labour Party (Scottish Section). In 1909, it merged fully with the Labour Party. In 1915, a Scottish Council was formed within the Labour Party.

== Election results ==
=== 1900 UK general election ===
Constituency	Candidate	Votes	Percentage	Position	Sponsor
Glasgow Camlachie	Alfred Ewen Fletcher	3,107	41.7	2	ILP

=== By-election, 1900 - 1906 ===
Election	Candidate	Votes	Percentage	Position	Sponsor
1901 North East Lanarkshire by-election	Robert Smillie	2,900	21.7	3	Miners
1904 North East Lanarkshire by-election	John Robertson	3,984	27.9	3	Miners

=== 1906 UK general election ===
Constituency	Candidate	Votes	Percentage	Position	Sponsor
Falkirk Burghs	David Gilmour	1,763	17.5	3	Miners
North Ayrshire	James Brown	2,684	20.8	3	Miners
North East Lanarkshire	John Robertson	4,658	29.2	3	Miners
North West Lanarkshire	Joseph Sullivan	3,291	23.9	3	Miners
Paisley	Robert Smillie	2,482	23.1	3	Miners
