= Ratigan =

Origin
- Meaning: Deriving from the Old High German reht, meaning "justice"

Ratigan is a surname. It is an anglicised form of the Irish patronym Ó Reachtagáin, meaning "descendant of Reachtagán", whose name derives from the Old High German reht, meaning "justice". The name may vary as O'Raghtaghan, Raghtigan, Rhatigan, Rattigan, Rhategan, Ractigan and Ratican.

== People with the surname ==
- William Ratigan (1910–1984), American author
- Dylan Ratigan (1972–present), American broadcaster and host of The Dylan Ratigan Show on MSNBC

=== Fictional characters with the surname ===
- Professor Ratigan, a character from the children's book Basil of Baker Street who appears as the main antagonist in the animated Disney film The Great Mouse Detective

== See also ==
- Rattigan
