= 1904 North East Lanarkshire by-election =

UK parliamentary by-election

- 10 August 1904

Candidate	Findlay	Touche	Robertson
Party	Liberal	Conservative	Scottish Workers
Popular vote	5,619	4,677	3,984
Percentage	39.3%	32.8%	27.9%
MP before election
William Henry Rattigan
Liberal Unionist
Subsequent MP
Alexander Findlay
Liberal

The 1904 North East Lanarkshire by-election was a Parliamentary by-election held on 10 August 1904. The constituency returned one Member of Parliament (MP) to the House of Commons of the United Kingdom, elected by the first past the post voting system.

== Vacancy ==
Sir William Henry Rattigan had been Liberal Unionist MP for the seat of North East Lanarkshire since the 1901 North East Lanarkshire by-election. He died on 4 July 1904 at the age of 62.

== Electoral history ==
The seat had been Liberal Unionist since they gained it in 1901;

1901 North East Lanarkshire by-election
Party	Candidate	Votes	%	±%
Liberal Unionist	William Henry Rattigan	5,673	42.6	−1.3
Liberal	Cecil Harmsworth	4,769	35.7	−20.4
Scottish Workers	Robert Smillie	2,900	21.7	New
Majority		904	6.9	N/A
Turnout		13,342	79.0	−0.3
Liberal Unionist gain from Liberal		Swing	+9.6	

== Candidates ==
- The Conservatives selected 43-year-old George Touche to defend the seat. In 1883 he was admitted to the Society of Accountants in Edinburgh. In 1889 he was appointed first secretary of the Industrial and General Trust, later becoming manager, director in 1898. In 1899 he founded his own practice, George A. Touch & Co.
- The local Liberal Association selected 60-year-old Alexander Findlay as their candidate.
- Thirty-seven-year-old John Robertson stood as candidate for the Scottish Workers' Representation Committee. He was Chairman of the Scottish Miners' Union.

== Campaign ==
Polling Day was fixed for 10 August 1904.

== Result ==
The Liberals gained the seat from the Conservatives;

North East Lanarkshire by-election, 1904
Party	Candidate	Votes	%	±%
Liberal	Alexander Findlay	5,619	39.3	+3.6
Conservative	George Touche	4,677	32.8	−9.8
Scottish Workers	John Robertson	3,984	27.9	+6.2
Majority		942	6.5	N/A
Turnout		14,280	75.5	−3.5
Liberal gain from Liberal Unionist		Swing		

== Aftermath ==
At the following General Election the result was;

General election January 1906
Party	Candidate	Votes	%	±%
Liberal	Alexander Findlay	6,436	40.4	+1.1
Conservative	Hugh Elliot	4,838	30.4	−2.4
Scottish Workers	John Robertson	4,658	29.2	+1.3
Majority		1,598	10.0	+3.5
Turnout		15,932	80.8	+5.3
Liberal hold		Swing		
