= North East Lanarkshire (UK Parliament constituency) =

Parliamentary constituency in the United Kingdom, 1885–1918

Coordinates: 55.829°N 3.760°W

- Former county constituency for the House of Commons

1885–1918
- Seats: One
- Created from: North Lanarkshire
- Replaced by: North Lanarkshire, Motherwell, Bothwell, and Coatbridge

North East Lanarkshire was a county constituency of the House of Commons of the Parliament of the United Kingdom (Westminster) from 1885 to 1918. It elected one Member of Parliament (MP) by the first past the post voting system.

== Boundaries ==
The name relates the constituency to the county of Lanark. The Redistribution of Seats Act 1885 provided that the North-East division was to consist of "the parishes of New Monkland, Shotts, Dalziel, Bothwell, and so much of the parish of Hamilton as lies north and east of the River Clyde".

== Members of Parliament ==
Election	Member	Party
1885	Donald Crawford	Liberal
1895	John Colville	Liberal
1901 by-election	Sir William Henry Rattigan	Liberal Unionist
1904 by-election	Alexander Findlay	Liberal
January 1910	Thomas Fleming Wilson	Liberal
1911 by-election	James Duncan Millar	Liberal
1918	constituency abolished	

== Election results ==
=== Elections in the 1880s ===
General election 1885: North East Lanarkshire
Party	Candidate	Votes	%	±%
Liberal	Donald Crawford	4,564	50.9	
Conservative	John Charles Cunninghame	4,405	49.1	
Majority		159	1.8	
Turnout		8,969	82.9	
Registered electors		10,814		
Liberal win (new seat)				

General election 1886: North East Lanarkshire
Party	Candidate	Votes	%	±%
Liberal	Donald Crawford	4,269	51.7	+0.8
Liberal Unionist	Edward Colebrooke	3,990	48.3	−0.8
Majority		279	3.4	+1.6
Turnout		8,259	76.4	−6.5
Registered electors		10,814		
Liberal hold		Swing	+0.8	

=== Elections in the 1890s ===
General election 1892: North East Lanarkshire
Party	Candidate	Votes	%	±%
Liberal	Donald Crawford	5,281	50.5	−1.2
Conservative	Alexander Whitelaw	5,184	49.5	+1.2
Majority		97	1.0	−2.4
Turnout		10,465	82.8	+6.4
Registered electors		12,645		
Liberal hold		Swing	−1.2	

General election 1895: North East Lanarkshire
Party	Candidate	Votes	%	±%
Liberal	John Colville	6,288	52.2	+1.7
Conservative	Alexander Whitelaw	5,751	47.8	−1.7
Majority		537	4.4	+3.4
Turnout		12,039	85.5	+2.7
Registered electors		14,083		
Liberal hold		Swing	+1.7	

=== Elections in the 1900s ===
General election 1900: North East Lanarkshire
Party	Candidate	Votes	%	±%
Liberal	John Colville	7,120	56.1	+3.9
Liberal Unionist	William Henry Rattigan	5,567	43.9	−3.9
Majority		1,553	12.2	+7.8
Turnout		12,687	79.3	−6.2
Registered electors		16,001		
Liberal hold		Swing	+3.9	

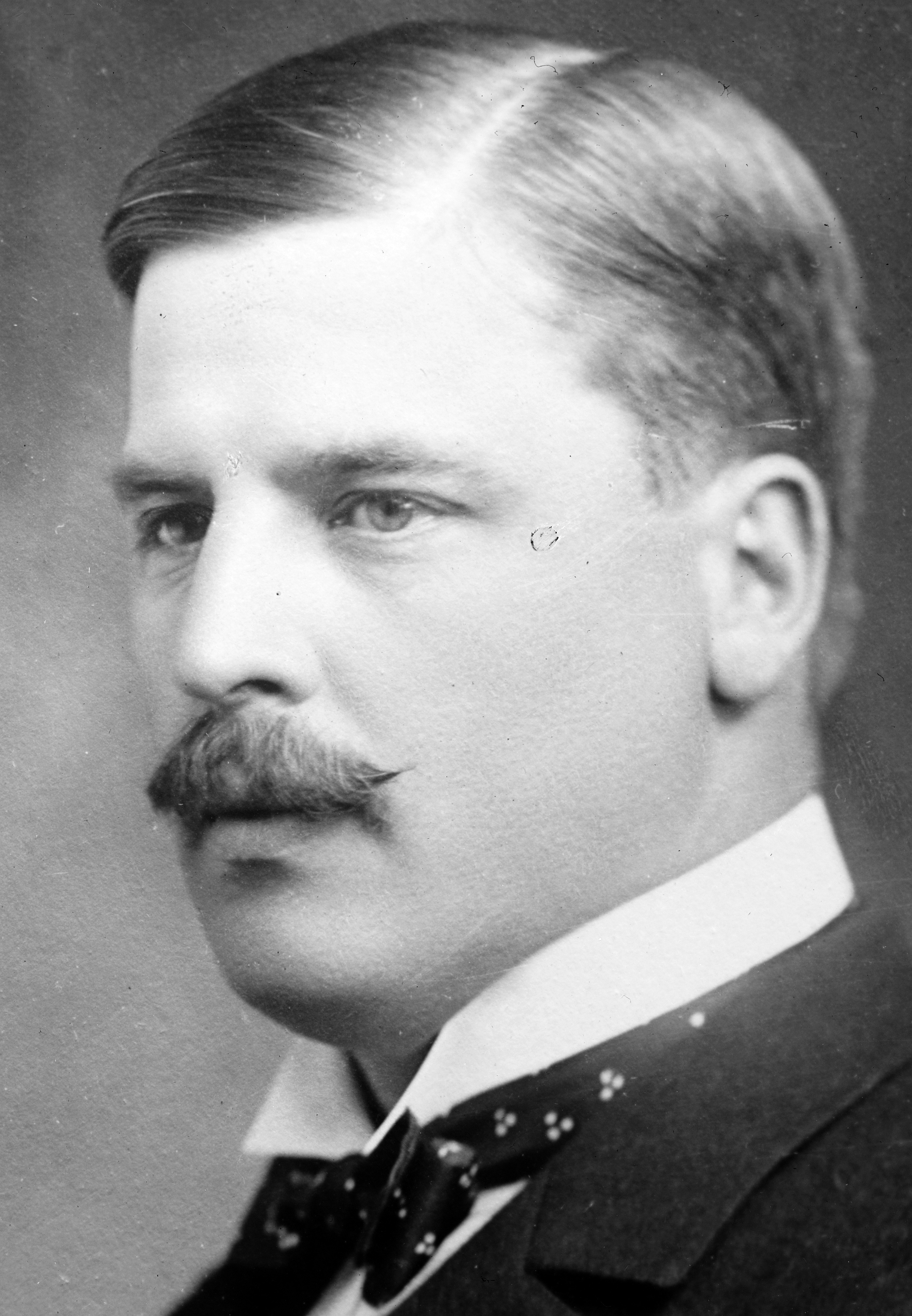
C.B. Harmsworth

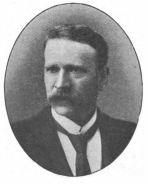
Robert Smillie

1901 North East Lanarkshire by-election
Party	Candidate	Votes	%	±%
Liberal Unionist	William Henry Rattigan	5,673	42.6	−1.3
Liberal	Cecil Harmsworth	4,769	35.7	−20.4
Scottish Workers	Robert Smillie	2,900	21.7	New
Majority		904	6.9	N/A
Turnout		13,342	79.0	−0.3
Registered electors		16,894		
Liberal Unionist gain from Liberal		Swing	+9.6	

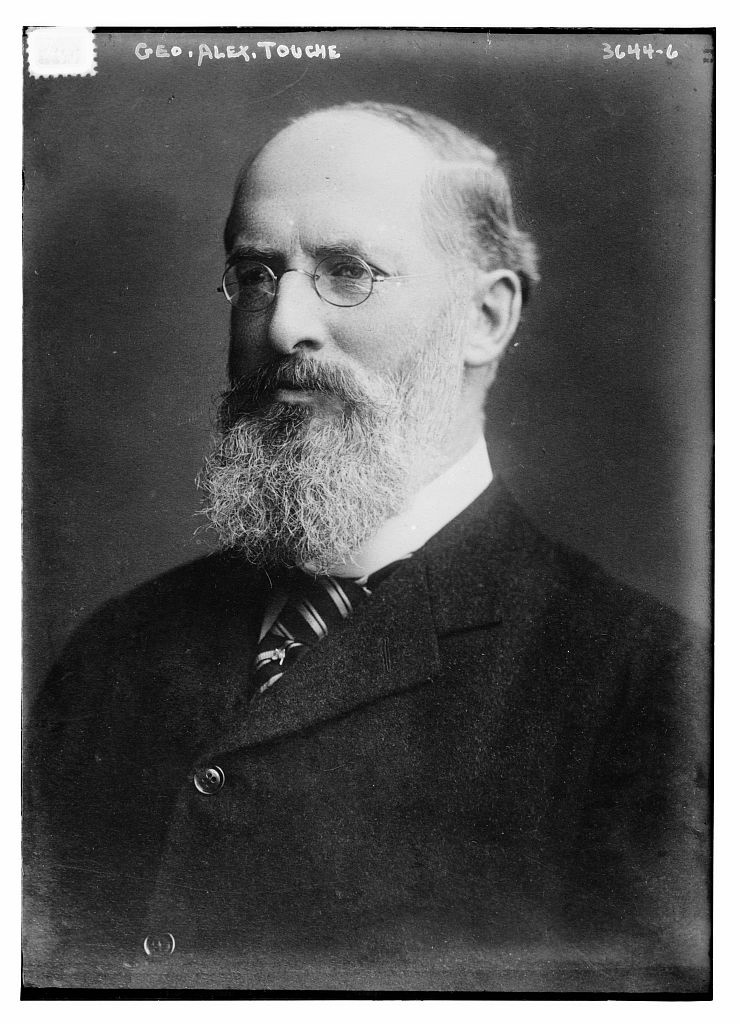
George Touche

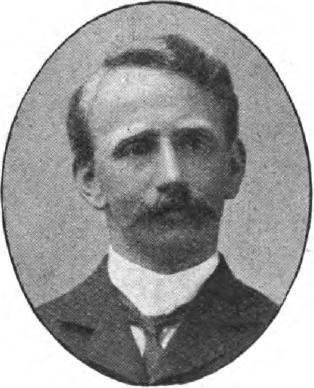
John Robertson

1904 North East Lanarkshire by-election (Note: Results compared to 1900 election)
Party	Candidate	Votes	%	±%
Liberal	Alexander Findlay	5,619	39.3	−16.8
Conservative	George Touche	4,677	32.8	−11.1
Scottish Workers	John Robertson	3,984	27.9	N/A
Majority		942	6.5	−5.7
Turnout		14,280	75.5	−3.8
Registered electors		18,922		
Liberal hold		Swing	−2.9	

General election 1906: North East Lanarkshire
Party	Candidate	Votes	%	±%
Liberal	Alexander Findlay	6,436	40.4	−15.7
Liberal Unionist	Hugh Elliot	4,838	30.4	−13.5
Scottish Workers	John Robertson	4,658	29.2	N/A
Majority		1,598	10.0	−2.2
Turnout		15,932	80.8	+1.5
Registered electors		19,728		
Liberal hold		Swing	−1.1	

=== Elections in the 1910s ===
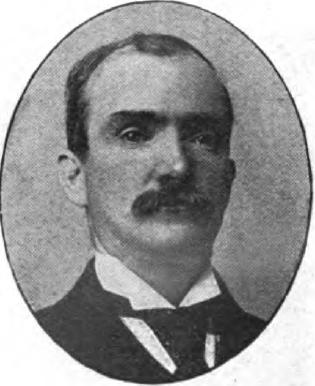
Joseph Sullivan

General election January 1910: North East Lanarkshire
Party	Candidate	Votes	%	±%
Liberal	Thomas Fleming Wilson	9,105	49.8	+9.4
Conservative	James Robertson Wilson	7,012	38.4	+8.0
Labour	Joseph Sullivan	2,160	11.8	−17.4
Majority		2,093	11.4	+1.4
Turnout		18,277	83.8	+3.0
Registered electors		21,811		
Liberal hold		Swing	+0.7	

General election December 1910: North East Lanarkshire
Party	Candidate	Votes	%	±%
Liberal	Thomas Fleming Wilson	9,848	58.0	+8.2
Conservative	John Peers Boyd-Carpenter	7,142	42.0	+3.6
Majority		2,706	16.0	+4.6
Turnout		16,990	75.3	−8.5
Registered electors		22,554		
Liberal hold		Swing	+2.3	

Duncan Millar

1911 North East Lanarkshire by-election
Party	Candidate	Votes	%	±%
Liberal	James Duncan Millar	7,976	45.3	−12.7
Conservative	Park Goff	6,776	38.4	−3.6
Labour	John Robertson	2,879	16.3	New
Majority		1,200	6.9	−9.1
Turnout		17,631	78.2	+2.9
Registered electors		22,554		
Liberal hold		Swing	−4.6	

== Notes and references ==
Notes
