= James Duncan Millar =

Scottish barrister and politician

Duncan Millar

Sir James Duncan Millar KC (5 August 1871 – 10 December 1932) was a Scottish barrister and Liberal, later Liberal National politician.

== Family and education ==
James Duncan Millar was the son of John Millar, a medical doctor from Edinburgh. He had family connections to Duncan McLaren, a former Edinburgh Member of Parliament (MP) and to the famous Liberal John Bright. His maternal grandfather was James Duncan who was a member of The Society of Writers to the Signet the Edinburgh legal association. He was educated at the University of Edinburgh where he obtained an MA degree and a Bachelor of Laws(LLB).

In 1906, he married Ella Forester-Paton of Alloa. They had one daughter and one son. Their son, Ian Alistair Duncan Millar, a Perthshire farmer, stood as Liberal candidate in the Kinross and Western Perthshire by-election in 1963 at which Alec Douglas-Home was returned to the House of Commons, coming second to Home.

== Law career ==
James Duncan Millar was one of the few men to become a member of both the Scottish and English Bars. He was admitted to the Faculty of Advocates in Edinburgh in 1896 and in the following year was called to the English Bar at the Middle Temple. He obtained a large practice in Scotland and was Senior Advocate Depute from 1913 to 1916.

He was made a King's Counsel in Scotland in January 1914.

== Politics ==
Millar was elected Liberal MP for St Andrews Burghs at the general election of January 1910 when he defeated the sitting Conservative, William Anstruther-Gray. However he lost the seat back to Anstruther-Gray at the December 1910 general election. In 1911, an opportunity arose for Millar with the resignation from Parliament of the Liberal MP for North East Lanarkshire, Thomas Fleming Wilson and Millar was re-elected to the House of Commons at a by-election held on 9 March 1911.

He held North East Lanarkshire until 1918, when the seat was abolished. He moved to contest Motherwell at the 1918 General Election as the Liberal party candidate, but finished second to the Unionist in a three-way contest.

Millar did not find another seat until the 1922 general election when he was successful at East Fife, gaining the seat from the Tories. This must have been a particularly sweet victory as the MP he defeated had taken the constituency from former Liberal leader H H Asquith in 1918, a seat Asquith had held since 1886. Millar was able to hold the seat at the 1923 general election but lost in 1924 to the Conservative Archibald Cochrane. He won the seat back from Cochrane at the 1929 general election albeit by the narrow margin of 581 votes

== Liberal National ==
In 1931, an economic crisis led to the formation of a National Government led by Labour prime minister Ramsay MacDonald and initially supported by the Conservative and Liberal parties. However the Liberals were increasingly divided over the issue of the National Government, particularly over the policy of Free Trade.

The official party led by Sir Herbert Samuel although agreeing to go into the 1931 general election supporting MacDonald became increasingly alarmed about the government's stance on Free Trade and worried about the predominance of the Conservatives in the coalition. However a group of Liberal MPs led by Sir John Simon who were concerned to ensure the National Government had a wide cross-party base formed the Liberal National Party to more openly support MacDonald's administration.

Millar was not one of the founding members of the Liberal National Party but his endorsement of the government's programme was enough to ensure the Conservatives did not put up a candidate against him in East Fife in 1931 and on 16 October 1931, Millar found himself returned unopposed to represent East Fife in the next Parliament.

He then chose to support the administration loyally and continued to describe himself as a Liberal National when the Samuelite Liberals withdrew from the coalition. He continued to enjoy the support of both the local Liberal and Conservative Associations in East Fife, with both of which organisations he had gained the reputation for being a good constituency MP, particularly in representing the interests of fishing and agriculture.

== Death ==
Millar died in office at the age of 61. At the by-election held on 2 February 1933 to fill the East Fife seat following Millar's death, the local Liberal Association selected the Simonite James Henderson-Stewart to fight the seat.

Standing as a Liberal National, Henderson-Stewart easily held the seat with a majority of 9,135 votes. He did not face Conservative opposition but there were four other candidates, including Labour, Agricultural Party, Independent Liberal and National Party of Scotland.

== Honours ==
In 1913, Millar was appointed by the Secretary of State for the Colonies to sit on a committee of experts to look into the spread of various diseases in Africa and how they could be controlled. Millar was knighted in the 1932 New Year Honours for political and public services.

== Death ==
Millar died at his home, Remony Lodge, Aberfeldy in Perthshire, on 10 December 1932, aged 61, following a period of some weeks suffering badly with phlebitis and complications.

Parliament of the United Kingdom
Preceded by William Anstruther-Gray	Member of Parliament for Member for St Andrews Burghs; January 1910 – December 1910	Succeeded by William Anstruther-Gray
Preceded by Thomas Fleming Wilson	Member of Parliament for North East Lanarkshire; 1911–1918	Constituency abolished
Preceded by Alexander Sprot	Member of Parliament for East Fife; 1922–1924	Succeeded by Archibald Cochrane
Preceded by Archibald Cochrane	Member of Parliament for East Fife; 1929–1933	Succeeded by James Henderson-Stewart
