= Helen Shaw (politician) =

Helen Brown Shaw MBE
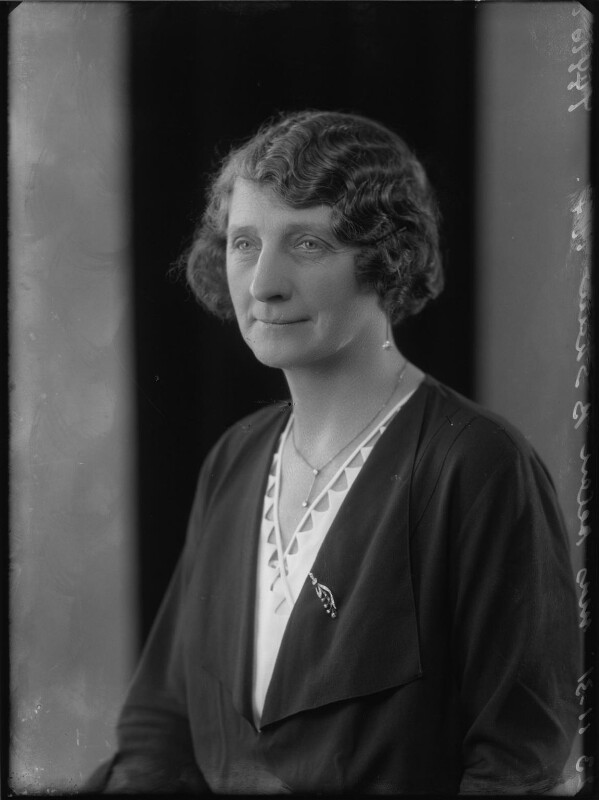

Member of Parliament for Bothwell
- In office 27 October 1931 – 13 November 1935
- Prime Minister: Stanley Baldwin
- Preceded by: Joseph Sullivan
- Succeeded by: James C. Welsh

Personal details
- Born: Helen Brown Graham; 2 June 1879 Glasgow, Scotland
- Died: 20 April 1964 (aged 84) Lanark, Lanarkshire, Scotland
- Party: Unionist Party
- Spouse: Major David Shaw (m. 1879; died 1914)
- Children: Anne Gillespie Shaw, Gavin Shaw

Helen Brown Shaw, MBE (née Graham; 2 June 1879 – 20 April 1964) was a Unionist Party politician in Scotland.

== Career ==
Shaw was active during World War I, chairing charities such as the Lanarkshire Prisoners of War Relief Committee. She was made an MBE in 1920. In 1930, she was the first woman to be elected to Lanarkshire County Council.

In the Conservative landslide of 1931, Shaw was elected Member of Parliament for the normally Labour seat of Bothwell. She held the seat until 1935, when it was regained by Labour. As an MP, she worked for improved condition in the Lanarkshire mines, and to bring new industries to the area. In 1938, she became district administrator of the WVS for air raid precautions, West of Scotland.

== Personal life ==
Shaw was the daughter of Annie Gillespie and David Graham, born in Glasgow, Scotland, on 2 June 1879. She married Major David Shaw of the 6th Cameronians on 18 September 1879. He was killed in action in Festubert, France in World War I. They had a daughter and a son. Her daughter, Anne Gillespie Shaw CBE, was a time and motion expert, and production engineer. Her son, Gavin Shaw, was president of the Bothwell Unionist Association, and was killed in action in World War II.

Parliament of the United Kingdom
Preceded by Joseph Sullivan	Member of Parliament for Bothwell; 1931–1935	Succeeded by James C. Welsh
