= Dorothy Smith (engineer) =

British electrical engineer (1899–1975)

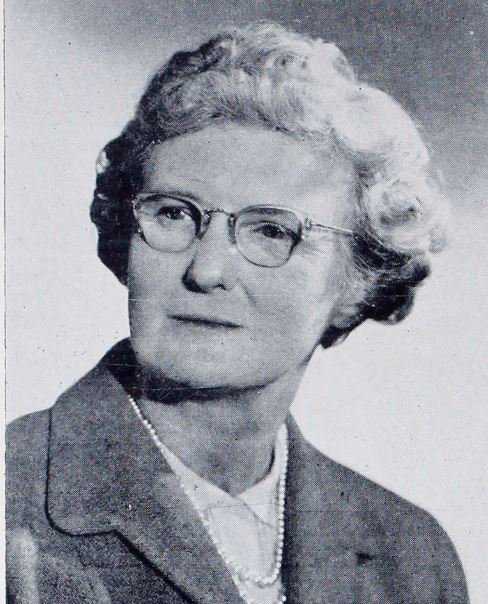
- Smith in 1958
- Born: 10 February 1899
- Died: 22 February 1975 (aged 76); Leamington Spa, Warwickshire, England
- Occupation: Chartered Electrical Engineer
- Known for: Chairman of Manchester Branch of the Women's Engineering Society 1943-45, second woman to achieve Full Membership of the Institution of Electrical Engineering in 1958

Dorothy Smith (10 February 1899 – 22 February 1975) was a British electrical engineer. She worked for the engineering firm Metropolitan-Vickers (formerly British Westinghouse) from 1916 to 1959, retiring after forty-three years at the company. She was the second woman to gain Full Membership of the Institution of Electrical Engineers since Hertha Ayrton in 1899 and was a prominent member of the Manchester branch of the Women's Engineering Society.

== Early life and education ==
Dorothy was born to parents James H Smith and Amelia Smith (née Bebbington) in Stretford, Lancashire. She attended the Manchester High School for Girls under a Foundation and Lancashire County Scholarship. Her favourite subject was mathematics, which would prompt her to apply for the apprenticeship at British Westinghouse when matriculating from high school. The engineering firm was beginning to take on female apprentices in response to the labour shortages brought on by conscription at the beginning of World War I, and Dorothy was among the first female apprentices taken on by the firm.

== Career and Metropolitan-Vickers ==
Dorothy joined the engineering firm British Westinghouse in 1916 as a junior trainee in the Transformer Drawing office. She quickly transferred to the Electrical Engineering Department where she spent 12 months, after which she was sent to the Induction Motor section to begin designing small induction motors. At the start of her employment with British Westinghouse, Dorothy attended part-time studies at the Manchester College of Technology and was awarded a College Associateship in Electrical Engineering after five years.

In 1930, Dorothy contributed to the design of a range of induction motors with improved ventilation and reduced size known as the RS- and RW-type motors. In 1934, she was transferred to the British Thomson-Houston Company to act as liaison between the Sales and Engineering Departments of their Manchester and Rugby branches, owing to her experience with the design of R-type motors. She returned to Metropolitan-Vickers after three years, where she began work on designing small direct current motors for use in shipboard services during World War 2.

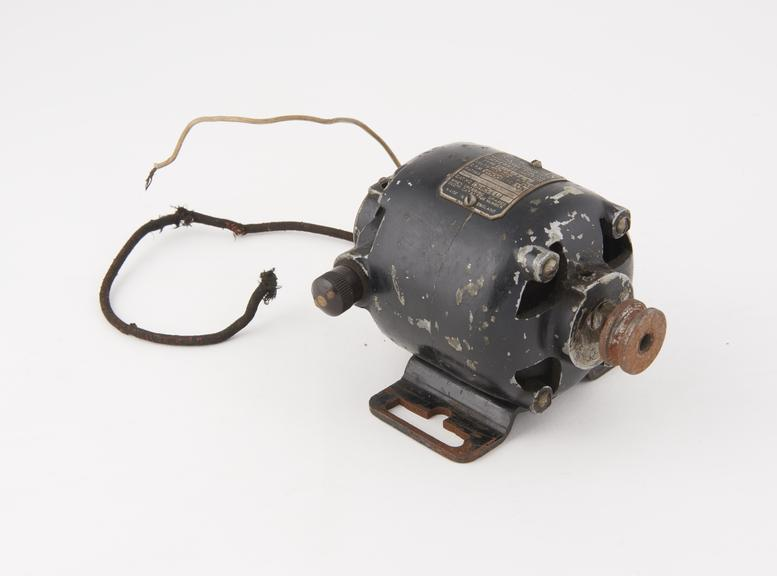
Metropolitan-Vickers Universal electric motor, c.1930. This engine was designed 11 years after Dorothy began working at the Trafford Park site of the engineering firm.

In 1937, Dorothy served as an opposition member at a meeting of the Metropolitan-Vickers Debating Society, arguing against the motion "That the Introduction of Female Apprentices to these works is to be deplored." She was joined in her opposition by Dorothy Garfitt, Anne Gillespie Shaw, and Gertrude Entwisle, fellow Metropolitan-Vickers employees and members of the Women's Engineering Society. The motion was lost by 78 votes to 61.

Between 1947 and her retirement in 1959, Dorothy was responsible for compiling detailed catalogues of flameproof motor designs manufactured by Metropolitan-Vickers, and oversaw the presentation of these designs to the Ministry of Power.

== Membership in professional organisations ==
Dorothy Smith gained an Associate Membership of the Institution of Electrical Engineers in 1927 and was awarded Full Membership in 1958, the first woman since Hertha Ayrton in 1899, to reach this level of membership.

She joined the Women's Engineering Society (WES) in the early 1920s shortly after its founding, and remained an honorary member until her death in 1975. She served in various positions within the organisation, acting as the first Treasurer of the Manchester Branch in 1943, Chairman of the Manchester Branch from 1943 to 1945, and was a member of general Council from 1947 until her retirement in 1959. She was elected an Honorary Member in 1965.

== Retirement and death ==
Dorothy Smith retired from the company after forty-three years on 7 April 1959, her colleagues remarking that "Her life and career can well be taken as an excellent example for any young lady who may otherwise think that success in the technical side of heavy engineering is something reserved for the male sex."

She left the Manchester area on retirement and died on 22 February 1975 at a nursing home in Leamington Spa. The funeral service was held on 27 February 1975 at St Michael and All Angels Church, Claverdon, Warwickshire, with cremation following at Oakley Wood Crematorium, near Leamington Spa. Her WES obituary was written by fellow Manchester branch member and Metropolitan Vickers colleague, Isabel Hardwich.
