= 1901 North East Lanarkshire by-election =

UK parliamentary by-election

- 26 September 1901

Candidate	Rattigan	Harmsworth	Smillie
Party	Liberal Unionist	Liberal	Scottish Workers
Popular vote	5,673	4,769	2,900
Percentage	42.6%	35.7%	21.7%
MP before election
John Colville
Liberal
Subsequent MP
Alexander Findlay
Liberal

The 1901 North East Lanarkshire by-election was a Parliamentary by-election held on 26 September 1901. The constituency returned one Member of Parliament (MP) to the House of Commons of the United Kingdom, elected by the first past the post voting system.

Liberal Unionist party candidate Sir William Henry Rattigan won the seat from the Liberal Party who had held the seat at the general election the year before.

== Result ==
1901 North East Lanarkshire by-election
Party	Candidate	Votes	%	±%
Liberal Unionist	William Henry Rattigan	5,673	42.6	−1.3
Liberal	Cecil Harmsworth	4,769	35.7	−20.4
Scottish Workers	Robert Smillie	2,900	21.7	New
Majority		904	6.9	N/A
Turnout		13,342	79.0	−0.3
Liberal Unionist gain from Liberal		Swing	+9.6	
