= John Colville (Liberal politician) =

Scottish businessman and Liberal politician (1852-901)

John Colville JP (Glasgow 3 July 1852 – Motherwell 22 August 1901) was a Scottish businessman and Liberal politician.

Colville was born in Glasgow in 1852, and educated at Hamilton and Gartsherrie Academies. He was head of the firm of David Colville & Sons at Motherwell, iron and steel manufacturers.

He was elected Provost of Motherwell in 1888, a position he held until 1895, and served as Commissioner of Supply, a justice of the peace and a county councillor of Lanarkshire. He was also president of Lanarkshire Christian Union. In 1895 Colville was elected a Liberal Member of Parliament (MP) for North-East Lanarkshire. He was re-elected with a larger majority in 1900 and served until his death the following year aged 49.

== Personal life ==
On 31 August 1885 he married Christina Marshall Downie, who was an active temperance worker.

His son John Colville was also a Member of Parliament, and Secretary of State for Scotland. He was created Baron Clydesmuir in 1948.

Parliament of the United Kingdom
| Preceded by Donald Crawford | Member of Parliament for North East Lanarkshire; 1895–1901 | Succeeded by Sir William Henry Rattigan |
