= Motherwell North =

UK Parliament constituency (1983–1997)

- Former burgh constituency for the House of Commons
- Subdivisions of Scotland: Lanarkshire

1983–1997
- Seats: one
- Created from: Bothwell, Lanark and North Lanarkshire
- Replaced by: Airdrie & Shotts, Hamilton North & Bellshill and Motherwell and Wishaw

Motherwell North was a burgh constituency represented in the House of Commons of the Parliament of the United Kingdom from 1983 to 1997. It was formed by the division of Motherwell and Wishaw and was later merged into a new creation of the constituency.

== Boundaries ==
The Motherwell District electoral divisions of Bellshill and Tannochside, Clydesdale, and Fortissat.

== Members of Parliament ==
Election	Member	Party
1983	Jimmy Hamilton	Labour
1987	John Reid	Labour
1997	constituency abolished. See: Airdrie & Shotts, Hamilton North & Bellshill and Motherwell and Wishaw	

== Election results ==
=== Elections of the 1980s ===
General election 1983: Motherwell North
Party	Candidate	Votes	%	±%
Labour	James Hamilton	24,483	57.8	+0.5
Conservative	Robert Hargrave	6,589	15.5	−5.6
Liberal	Gordon Whitelaw	5,970	14.1	+6.2
SNP	Richard Lyle	5,333	12.6	−1.1
Majority		17,894	42.3	+6.1
Turnout		42,375	75.0	
Labour win (new seat)				

General election 1987: Motherwell North
Party	Candidate	Votes	%	±%
Labour	John Reid	29,825	66.9	+9.1
SNP	Andrew Currie	6,230	14.0	+1.4
Conservative	Robert Hargrave	4,939	11.1	−4.4
Liberal	George Swift	3,558	8.0	−6.1
Majority		23,595	52.9	+10.6
Turnout		44,552	77.3	+2.3
Labour hold		Swing	+6.8	

=== Elections of the 1990s ===
General election 1992: Motherwell North
Party	Candidate	Votes	%	±%
Labour	John Reid	27,852	63.4	−3.5
SNP	David Clark	8,942	20.3	+6.3
Conservative	Robert Hargrave	5,011	11.4	+0.3
Liberal Democrats	Harriet Smith	2,145	4.9	−3.1
Majority		18,910	43.1	−9.8
Turnout		43,950	76.9	−0.4
Labour hold		Swing	−1.9	
