= Anne Gillespie Shaw =

Engineer and entrepreneur

- Born: 28 May 1904; Uddingston, Scotland
- Died: 4 February 1982 (aged 77); Macclesfield, Cheshire, England
- Education: University of Edinburgh; Bryn Mawr College
- Occupations: Engineer, Industrial Psychologist

Annie "Anne" Gillespie Shaw CBE (28 May 1904 – 4 February 1982) was a Scottish engineer and businesswoman. Shaw specialised in time and motion studies. In 1945, she founded the Anne Shaw Organisation Ltd, a consulting company.

== Life and career ==
Shaw was born in Uddingston, Scotland, on 28 May 1904 to Helen Brown Shaw, a politician who became MP for Bothwell in 1931, and David Perston Shaw. She attended St Leonard's School in St Andrews and Laurel Bank School in Glasgow. She studied at the University of Edinburgh before taking her postgraduate certificate at Bryn Mawr College in Bryn Mawr, Pennsylvania.

Shaw met Dr Lillian Gilbreth at Bryn Mawr College and became Gilbreth's research assistant in the field of Motion Study. Shaw then began working at Gilbreth, Inc. until 1930 when she returned to the UK.

She was a personnel officer at Metropolitan-Vickers before becoming chief supervisor of women workers in 1933, and was the company's chief motion-study investigator between 1930 and 1945. She was also a consultant to the Associated Electrical Industries group of which Metropolitan-Vickers was a part.

Shaw joined the Women's Engineering Society in 1935. At the 13th annual conference of the Society, Shaw gave a presentation on her study of motion at the Science Museum in Kensington, London. In late 1936, Shaw helped produce a film for the Electrical Association for Women which demonstrated the application of motion study concerning food preparation in the home. On 31 May 1937, she was selected by the National Institute of Industrial Psychology to lecture on modern developments in the study of time and motion.

On 26 November 1937, at the Metropolitan-Vickers Debating Society, Shaw served as an opponent of a motion "That the Introduction of Female Apprentices to these works is to be deplored". As a result of her opposing voice, alongside those of Gertrude Entwisle, Dorothy Smith, and the speech of Dorothy Garfitt, a recently accepted apprentice, the motion lost by a margin of 17 votes.

Shaw married John H. Pirie in 1937 and they had three children. To continue working at Metropolitan-Vickers as a married woman, and to ensure the continued employment of her colleague Margery Havelock after her wedding in 1937, Shaw persuaded the Company Board in 1938 to remove its marriage bar.

Shaw was recruited by the Minister of Aircraft Production, Stafford Cripps, in 1942 and during World War II, she worked on the Production Efficiency Board as an adviser to the aircraft industry.

In 1945, Shaw established the Anne Shaw Organisation Ltd of which she was the chairman and managing director until 1975. Between 1964 and 1979, she was also the director of Wescot Ltd.

== Death and legacy ==
In the 1954 New Year Honours she was appointed a Commander of the Order of the British Empire for services in the field of personnel management.

Shaw died on 4 February 1982 in Macclesfield, Cheshire, aged 77.

In 2017, Shaw was inducted into the Scottish Engineering Hall of Fame.

== Publications ==
She published “An Introduction to the Theory and Application of Motion Study" in 1944, "The Full Application of Motion Study" in 1950, and "The Purpose and Practice of Motion Study" in 1952.

== See also ==
- A. G. L. Shaw
