= Thomas Fleming Wilson =

British politician (1862–1929)

T.F. Wilson

Sir Thomas Fleming Wilson KBE JP (2 June 1862 – 2 April 1929) was a British solicitor who served as Liberal MP for North East Lanarkshire for around a year.

He was educated at the High School of Glasgow and the University of Glasgow.A solicitor, he became a partner in Wilson, Clalmers, and Hendry, solicitors. For 15 years he was a member of the Lanark County Council, and he was for many years Liberal election agent for the Camlachie Division of Glasgow.

He was first elected at the general election of January 1910. He was re-elected in December 1910, but resigned shortly after, forcing a by-election in March 1911. He was active during the First World War in several areas, including as clerk to the General Munitions of War Tribunal for Scotland. He was created a Knight Commander of the Order of the British Empire in the 1918 Birthday Honours.

He was director to many companies.

He died in Uddingston, South Lanarkshire, aged 66.

Parliament of the United Kingdom
Preceded by Alexander Findlay	Member of Parliament for North East Lanarkshire; January 1910 – 1911	Succeeded by James Duncan Millar
