= Edith Mary Douglas =

British engineer, shipyard director

- Born: Edith Mary Dale; 13 November 1877; Kanpur, British Raj
- Died: 30 November 1962 (aged 85); United Kingdom
- Spouse: Major Clifford Hugh Douglas
- Children: 1
- Parent: George Desborough Dale

Edith Mary Douglas (née Dale) (13 November 1877 – 30 November 1962) was a British engineer, shipyard director and the first woman to fly in an experimental bomber aircraft.

== Early life and marriage ==
Edith Mary Dale was born in Kanpur, India. Her father was George Desborough Dale, and he worked in the Indian Civil Service. Douglas was sent home to school in England.

She married Major Clifford Hugh Douglas in 1915. She was his second wife and they had one daughter. Douglas was often referred to as Mrs C. H. Douglas, using the convention of adopting the husband's full name.

== Entry into engineering circles ==
Through her husband Edith Douglas learned about engineering and finance. Her husband was one of the founders of the Social Credit movement during the 1920s.

He was Assistant Superintendent of the Royal Aircraft Factory Farnborough during the First World War. Douglas worked with her husband and got involved with the technical aspect of his work. As a result, Douglas was the first woman to fly in experimental bomber aircraft. She attended the 1926 World Engineering Conference in Tokyo and travelled around the world twice, and was considered a great raconteur about her travels.

She became co-director of the Swanwick Shipyard (Hamble River Yacht & Engineering Co.) The shipyard worked on craft powered by sail, steam or motor, generated its own electricity and pumped its own water, and had a slipway for boats up to 250 tons. During the Second World War the company provided construction for small craft for the Admiralty.

Douglas was actively involved in establishing women's organisations.

== Women's Engineering Society ==
She became a member of the Women's Engineering Society in 1932, was elected vice president to celebrated pilot Amy Johnson when she held the presidential role, often stepping in when Johnson was unavailable. Edith Douglas became president of the society in 1938. She was succeeded in the role by Caroline Haslett and her vice president was electrical engineer Gertrude Entwisle. A 1937 article stated that the soon to be WES president “Mrs. Douglas… starts work most days round about 8 a.m. in Southampton ship-building yard which belongs to the company of which she a director. In a blue flannel suit and old yachting cap, this handsome, dark-eyed woman directs gangs of men and organises the business of the yard”. She told the interviewer that “more women should go in for planning yachts. Even though yachts do float, they are potential homes and as such should be planned from the woman’s point of view.”

Edith Douglas was a successful competitive sailor and yachtsman and won many prizes in regattas, owning a sloop named 'Enid'. She loved playing sport, particularly tennis and golf, and had a great sense of humour. After the end of the war, she retired and moved to Scotland.

Edith Mary Douglas died on 30 November 1962.
