= James Hamilton (Scottish politician) =

British politician

James Hamilton, CBE (11 March 1918 – 11 April 2005) was a British Labour Party politician.

Hamilton was a construction engineer and was on the national executive of the Constructional Engineering Union and on the Scottish Board for Industry. He served as a councillor on Lanarkshire County Council from 1956.

Hamilton was Member of Parliament for Bothwell from 1964 to 1983, and for Motherwell North from 1983 to 1987, when he retired and was replaced by the future senior minister, John Reid.

Hamilton served as a Government whip (1969–1970 and 1974), Vice-Chamberlain of the Household (1974–1978) and Comptroller of the Household (1978–1979).

Parliament of the United Kingdom
Preceded by John Timmons	Member of Parliament for Bothwell; 1964–1983	Constituency abolished
New constituency	Member of Parliament for Motherwell North; 1983–1987	Succeeded by John Reid
Political offices
Preceded by Don Concannon	Vice-Chamberlain of the Household; 1974–1978	Succeeded by Donald Coleman
Preceded by Joseph Harper	Comptroller of the Household; 1978–1979	Succeeded by Spencer Le Marchant
