= C. H. Douglas =

British engineer and economic theorist (1879–1952)

Major C. H. Douglas MIMechE, MIEE
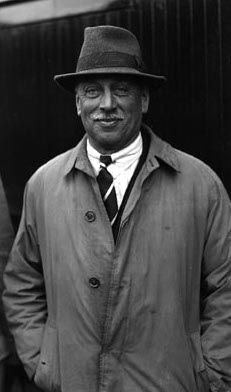
- C. H. Douglas in Edmonton, Alberta, Canada, 1934
- Born: Clifford Hugh Douglas; 20 January 1879; Edgeley or Manchester, England, United Kingdom of Great Britain and Ireland
- Died: 29 September 1952 (aged 73); Fearnan, Scotland, United Kingdom
- Spouse: Edith Mary Douglas

Academic background
- Education: Pembroke College, Cambridge
- Influences: Plato, Aristotle, Socrates, Augustine, Aquinas, Alighieri, Montaigne, Erasmus, More, Fisher, Milton, Smith, Hume, Montesquieu, George, Burke, Maistre, MacDonald, Chesterton, Belloc, Tolkien, Lewis, Benson, Carlyle, Maurras, Newman, Marx, Veblen, Gesell, Pareto, Keynes,

Academic work
- Discipline: Civil engineering, Economics, Finances, Political science, History, Accounting, Physics
- School or tradition: Social Credit and distributism
- Institutions: Institution of Mechanical Engineers, Institution of Electrical Engineers
- Notable ideas: Cultural heritage as factor of production, Economic sabotage, Unearned increment of association, Money as means of distribution of production, A + B theorem, National dividend, Practical Christianity

Major Clifford Hugh Douglas, MIMechE, MIEE (20 January 1879 – 29 September 1952), was a British engineer, economist and pioneer of the social credit economic reform movement.

== Education and engineering career ==
C. H. Douglas was born in either Edgeley or Manchester, the son of Hugh Douglas and his wife Louisa (Hordern) Douglas. Few details are known about his early life and training; he probably served an engineering apprenticeship before beginning an engineering career that brought him to locations throughout the British Empire in the employ of electric companies, railways and other institutions. He taught at Stockport Grammar School. After a period in industry, he went up to Pembroke College, Cambridge, at the age of 31 but stayed only four terms and left without graduating.

He worked for the Westinghouse Electric Corporation of America and claimed to have been the Reconstruction Engineer for the British Westinghouse Company in India (the company has no record of him ever working there), Deputy Chief Engineer of the Buenos Aires and Pacific Railway Company, Railway Engineer of the London Post Office (Tube) Railway and Assistant Superintendent of the Royal Aircraft Factory Farnborough during World War I, with a temporary commission as captain in the Royal Flying Corps. His second wife was Edith Mary Douglas, President of the Women's Engineering Society.

== Economics and social credit ==
While he was reorganising the work of the Royal Aircraft Establishment during World War I, Douglas noticed that the weekly total costs of goods produced was greater than the sums paid to workers for wages, salaries and dividends. This seemed to contradict the theory of classic Ricardian economics, saying that all costs are distributed simultaneously as purchasing power.

Troubled by the seeming difference between the way money flowed and the objectives of industry ("delivery of goods and services", in his view), Douglas set out to apply engineering methods to the economic system.

Douglas collected data from more than 100 large British businesses and found that all except those becoming bankrupt, spent less in salaries, wages and dividends than the value of goods and services produced each week: the workers were not paid enough to buy back what they had made. He published his observations and conclusions in a 1918 article in the magazine English Review where he suggested: "That we are living under a system of accountancy which renders the delivery of the nation's goods and services to itself a technical impossibility." The reason, Douglas concluded, was that the economic system was organized to maximize profits for those with economic power by creating unnecessary scarcity. Between 1916 and 1920, he developed his economic ideas, publishing two books in 1920, Economic Democracy and Credit-Power and Democracy, followed in 1924 by Social Credit.

The basis of Douglas's reform ideas was to free workers from this system by bringing purchasing power in line with production, an idea which became known as social credit. His proposal had two main elements: a national dividend to distribute money (debt-free credit) equally to all citizens, over and above their earnings, to help bridge the gap between purchasing power and prices; also a price adjustment mechanism, called the "just price", to forestall inflation. The just price would effectively reduce retail prices by a percentage that reflected the physical efficiency of the production system. Douglas observed that the cost of production is consumption; meaning the exact physical cost of production is the total resources consumed in the production process. As the physical efficiency of production increases, the just price mechanism will reduce the price of products for the consumer. The consumers can then buy as much of what the producers produce that they want and automatically control what continues to be produced by their consumption of it. Individual freedom, primary economic freedom, was the central goal of Douglas's reform.

At the end of World War I, Douglas retired from engineering to promote his reform ideas full-time, which he would do for the rest of his life. His ideas inspired the Canadian social credit movement (which obtained control of Alberta's provincial government in 1935), the short-lived Douglas Credit Party in Australia and the longer-lasting Social Credit Political League in New Zealand. Douglas also lectured on social credit in the United States, the United Kingdom, Ireland, Canada, France, Germany, Italy, Japan, Australia, New Zealand and Norway.

In 1923, he appeared as a witness before the Canadian Banking Inquiry, and in 1930 before the Macmillan Committee. In 1929 he made a lecture tour of Japan, where his ideas were enthusiastically received by industry and government.

His 1933 edition of Social Credit made a reference to the Protocols of the Elders of Zion, remarking that its authenticity was of "little importance" and that what "is interesting about it, is the fidelity with which the methods by which such enslavement might be brought about can be seen reflected in the facts of everyday experience." In his later years, Douglas became increasingly paranoid and occupied with antisemitic conspiracy theories, specifically the idea, as detailed in his 1942 publication The Big Idea, that an international organization of major banking institutions was conspiring to achieve world domination, a group he variously referred to as "International Financiers," "the Masonic Lodges," "Judaism," "the Secret Government", "Socialism", and "a gang of New York Jews". He believed that this group had deliberately orchestrated World War II for their own financial benefit, and for the opportunity to exert power over impoverished nations when the war ended. In The Big Idea, he wrote, "While all international Financiers are not Jews, many are, and the observable policy of these Jews and of Freemasonry is that of the Talmud. This group can be identified first with Pan-Germanism, and secondly with Pan-Americanism, both of which aim at the destruction of British culture and prestige either by conquest or absorption."

== Death and legacy ==
Douglas died in his home in Fearnan, Scotland. Douglas and his theories are referred to several times (unsympathetically) in Lewis Grassic Gibbon's trilogy A Scots Quair. He is also mentioned, together with Karl Marx and Silvio Gesell, by John Maynard Keynes in The General Theory of Employment, Interest, and Money (1936, p. 32). Douglas's theories permeate the poetry and economic writings of Ezra Pound. Robert Heinlein's first novel For Us, The Living: A Comedy of Customs describes a near future United States operating according to the principles of social credit.

== Publications ==
- Economic Democracy (1920) new edition: December 1974; Bloomfield Books; ISBN 0-904656-06-3
- Credit-Power and Democracy (1920) new edition: August 2011; BiblioLife; ISBN 978-1241274955
- The Control and Distribution of Production (1922)
- Social Credit (1924, Revised 1933) new edition: December 1979; Institute of Economic Democracy, Canada; ISBN 0-920392-26-1
- Warning Democracy, C M Grieve, London; (1931)
- The Monopoly of Credit (1931) new edition: 1979; Bloomfield Books; ISBN 0-904656-02-0
- The Use of Money (1935)
- The Alberta Experiment: An Interim Survey (1937)
- The Brief for the Prosecution, Legion for the Survival of Freedom, Incorporated; (December 1986) ISBN 0-949667-80-3
- Whose Service is Perfect Freedom?, Canada; Veritas Publishing Company; (June 1986) ISBN 0-949667-64-1
- The Big Idea, Veritas Publishing Company, Canada; (June 1986) ISBN 0-88636-000-5
- The Grip of Death, Jon Carpenter, UK; (May 1998) ISBN 1-897766-40-8

== See also ==
- Monetary reform
- Monetary reform in Britain
