= Gertrude Lilian Entwisle =

British electrical engineer

- fair use - no known owner
- Born: 12 June 1892; Swinton, Greater Manchester, England
- Died: 18 November 1961 (aged 69); Sale, Greater Manchester, England
- Education: University of Manchester
- Occupation: Electrical engineer
- Known for: Engineering design

Gertrude Lilian Entwisle (12 June 1892 – 18 November 1961) was an electrical engineer. She was the first British woman to retire from a complete career in industry as a professional engineer; the first female engineer to work at British Westinghouse; and the first female student, graduate, and associate member of the Institution of Electrical Engineers (now the Institution of Engineering and Technology). Entwisle was known for her work on designing DC motors and exciters. Her obituary said she broke "barriers of prejudice to become a respected designer of electrical rotating machinery."

== Early life and education ==
Gertrude Entwisle was born at 5 Stafford Road, Swinton, Lancashire, on 12 June 1892, the younger of two daughters of Elizabeth Ann, née Shorrocks (1854–1932) and Thomas Henry Entwisle (1858–1937), clerk in a shipping warehouse.

She was educated at Milham Ford School in Oxford and Manchester High School for Girls and obtained a scholarship to the University of Manchester where she studied from 1911 to 1914. Entwisle originally studied physics under Ernest Rutherford, but was able to attend engineering classes in her second year when they were opened to female students.

In July 1914, Entwisle failed her preliminary physics examination and left the Victoria University of Manchester without graduating. Entwisle's Oxford Dictionary of National Biography entry states that it was noted on her student card that she was to be married in the month of her graduation in 1914. However, no records of this marriage or any subsequent marriage exists.

== Early Career during World War I ==
In 1915, at the beginning of the World War I, British Westinghouse (later Metropolitan-Vickers) was looking into the recruitment of women engineers to manage the shortages of skilled technical employees at the time. The Chief Engineer John S Peck (who had taken out patents on electrical distribution systems) had approached the Manchester College of Science and Technology to enquire about suitable candidates, and when the invitation came to Entwisle's attention she joined the company, working first on test results and then on the design of DC motors.

There was some consternation among the management when she asked for permission to enter the engineering works: eventually it was decided that she was permitted as long as she did not wear trousers.

During World War I, Entwisle spent her weekends nursing in a Red Cross hospital and also attended evening classes at Manchester College of Science and Technology.

== Later career ==
Being an umarried woman, Entwisle was able to continue working at British Westinghouse (later known as Metropolitan-Vickers) after the war's end as they did not hire married women. She spent most of her career working on the design, manufacturing, and cost of AC and DC machines, in particular DC motors.

In 1937, Entwistle served as an opposition member at a meeting of the Metropolitan-Vickers Debating Society, arguing against the motion “That the Introduction of Female Apprentices to these works is to be deplored.” She was joined in her opposition by Dorothy Garfitt, Anne Gillespie Shaw, and Dorothy Smith, fellow Metropolitan-Vickers employees and members of the Women's Engineering Society. The motion was lost by 78 votes to 61.

Towards the end of her career, Entwisle concentrated on exciters, on which she became something of a specialist.

On 20 June 1954, Entwisle retired from Metropolitan-Vickers after an uninterrupted professional career of thirty-nine years as an electrical design engineer. In a speech encouraging girls to take up engineering as a career, given in Portsmouth in the mid-1950s, she noted that "We are no longer at the stage when the appearance of a woman in the shops makes the whole place stop work, as it did when I started".

Entwisle was the first British woman to retire from a complete career in industry as a professional engineer.

== Professional organisations ==
Entwisle joined the Institution of Electrical Engineers as a Student Member in 1916 and became a Graduate Member in 1919 and an Associate Member in 1920 - she was the first woman to become a member in each of these grades. When she attended her first IEE lecture, the chairman of the meeting stopped proceedings as he suspected her of being a militant suffragette bent on disrupting the meeting. Her acceptance by her fellow engineers was hard-won - at the second meeting of the IEE she attended, she was once again barred from entry by the commissionaire. After half an hour of argument, Entwisle was allowed to enter when the secretary vouched for her eligibility.

The Women's Engineering Society (WES) had been founded in 1919, and Entwisle was one of its founder members. She was a member of Council, first secretary of the Manchester Branch, Vice President to Edith Mary Douglas and President from 1941 to 1943. She succeeding Caroline Haslett in the role, and was succeeded in turn by electrical engineer Margaret Partridge. Entwisle retired from the WES council in 1954, the year of her professional retirement.

Entwisle also had a significant involvement with the Electrical Association for Women (EAW), founded in 1924 and a "daughter organisation" of the Women's Engineering Society. She was a member of its national executive committee during the society's early years and the first honorary secretary of the EAW's Manchester branch, formed in 1926. Entwisle also belonged to the British Federation of University Women and of the Association of Scientific Workers trade union. She was also the first female member of the Society of Technical Engineers.
