= James C. Welsh =

Scottish miner, trade unionist, novelist and politician

James C. Welsh (2 June 1880 – 4 November 1954) was a miner, trade unionist, novelist and Scottish Labour Party politician who served as a Member of Parliament (MP) from 1922 to 1931, and from 1935 to 1945. Welsh worked in mines from the age of 12, an experience which informed his first novels The Underworld (1920) and The Morlocks (1924). He later became a full-time official for the mining union. He unsuccessfully contested the 1918 general election in the Lanark constituency. At the 1922 general election, he was elected as MP for Coatbridge constituency, where he was re-elected in 1923, 1924 and 1929, but was defeated at the 1931 general election by the Conservative Party candidate William Paterson Templeton.

He was returned to the House of Commons at the 1935 general election as MP for Bothwell, and held the seat until he stepped down at the 1945 general election.

== Selected works ==
- Songs of a Miner (1917)
- The Underworld (1920)
- The Morlocks (1924)
- Norman Dale, M.P. (1928)

== Sources ==
- Craig, F. W. S. (1983) [1969]. British parliamentary election results 1918-1949 (3rd ed.). Chichester: Parliamentary Research Services. ISBN 0-900178-06-X.
- Leigh Rayment's Peerage Pages

Parliament of the United Kingdom
Preceded by A. L. H. Buchanan	Member of Parliament for Coatbridge; 1922–1931	Succeeded by William Templeton
Preceded by Helen Shaw	Member of Parliament for Bothwell; 1935–1945	Succeeded by John Timmons
