= John Timmons =

British coalminer and Labour politician

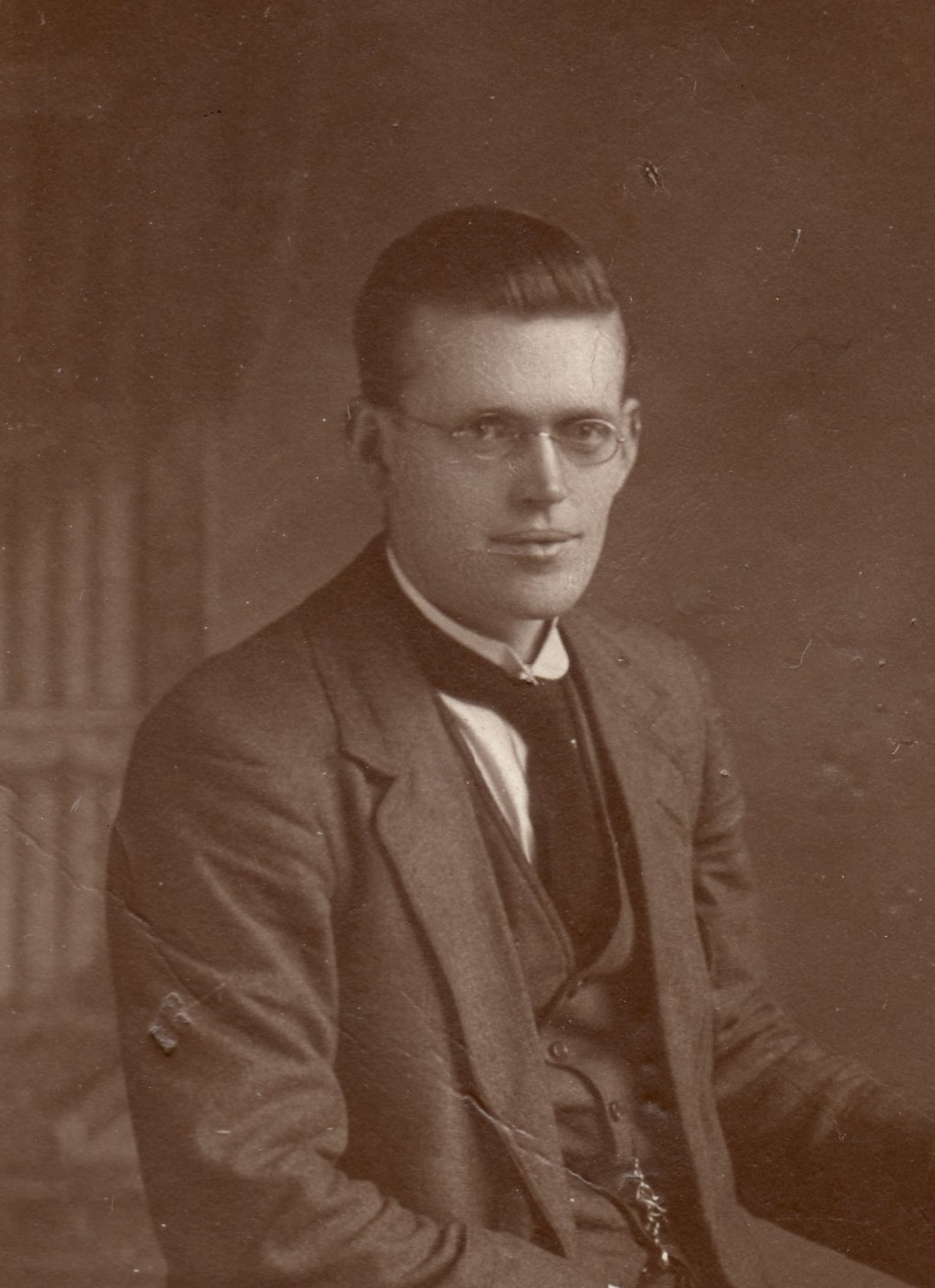
- John Timmons
- Born: 14 May 1890; North Lanarkshire, Scotland
- Died: 21 November 1964 (aged 74)
- Occupation: British politician

John Timmons JP (14 May 1890 – 21 November 1964) was a British coalminer and Labour Party politician.

== Early life ==
Born in North Lanarkshire on 14 May 1890, Timmons attended St Aloysius School, Chapelhall. Following in the family tradition, Timmons went down the mines at the age of 12. He worked at the coal face but studied in his spare time, gaining his mine manager's certificate. He was subsequently promoted to the job of checkweighman, and studied at Coatbridge Technical College. An active member of the Miners' Federation, Timmons joined the Labour Party in 1911. He was Branch Secretary of his union for 30 years. Timmons was married in Ireland to Emily Connolly from Newry, County Down. He had 7 children, four sons and three daughters. Timmons' eldest son Patrick was lost in action over the North Sea, while serving with the RAF on 14 January 1942.

== Advancement ==
In 1938 Timmons was elected to Lanarkshire County Council. He had several local administrative responsibilities, including being on the panel of referees for the Ministry of Labour, and a member of the advisory committee to the Assistance Board.

== Parliament ==
Timmons was elected as Labour Member of Parliament for Bothwell at the 1945 general election. It was difficult for Scottish MPs to find lodgings in post-war London, which had been badly affected by the Blitz. Timmons found accommodation at the home of the Mayor and Mayoress of Lambeth in Denny Crescent, Kennington with other Scottish MPs including John Rankin (politician). At Westminster Timmons rarely spoke, nevertheless as a former coal miner Timmons spoke at length on the industry in debates. He was a member of the left-wing faction who disapproved of the continuation of National Service and supported Aneurin Bevan in the early 1950s. A Roman Catholic of Irish descent, in 1949 Timmons voted against the Ireland Bill which gave the Parliament of Northern Ireland a veto against the end of partition.

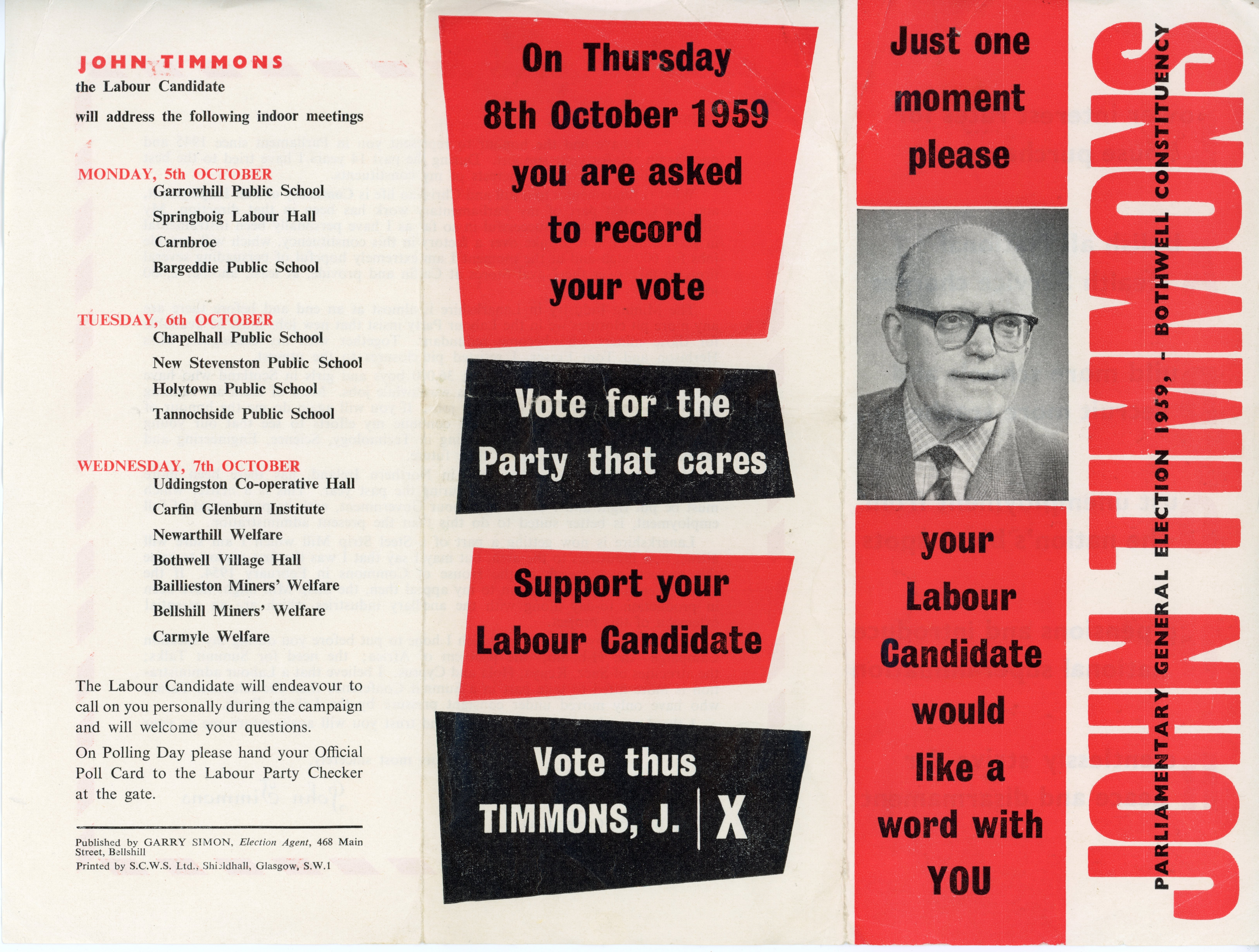
John Timmons M.P. 1959 Election Leaftet

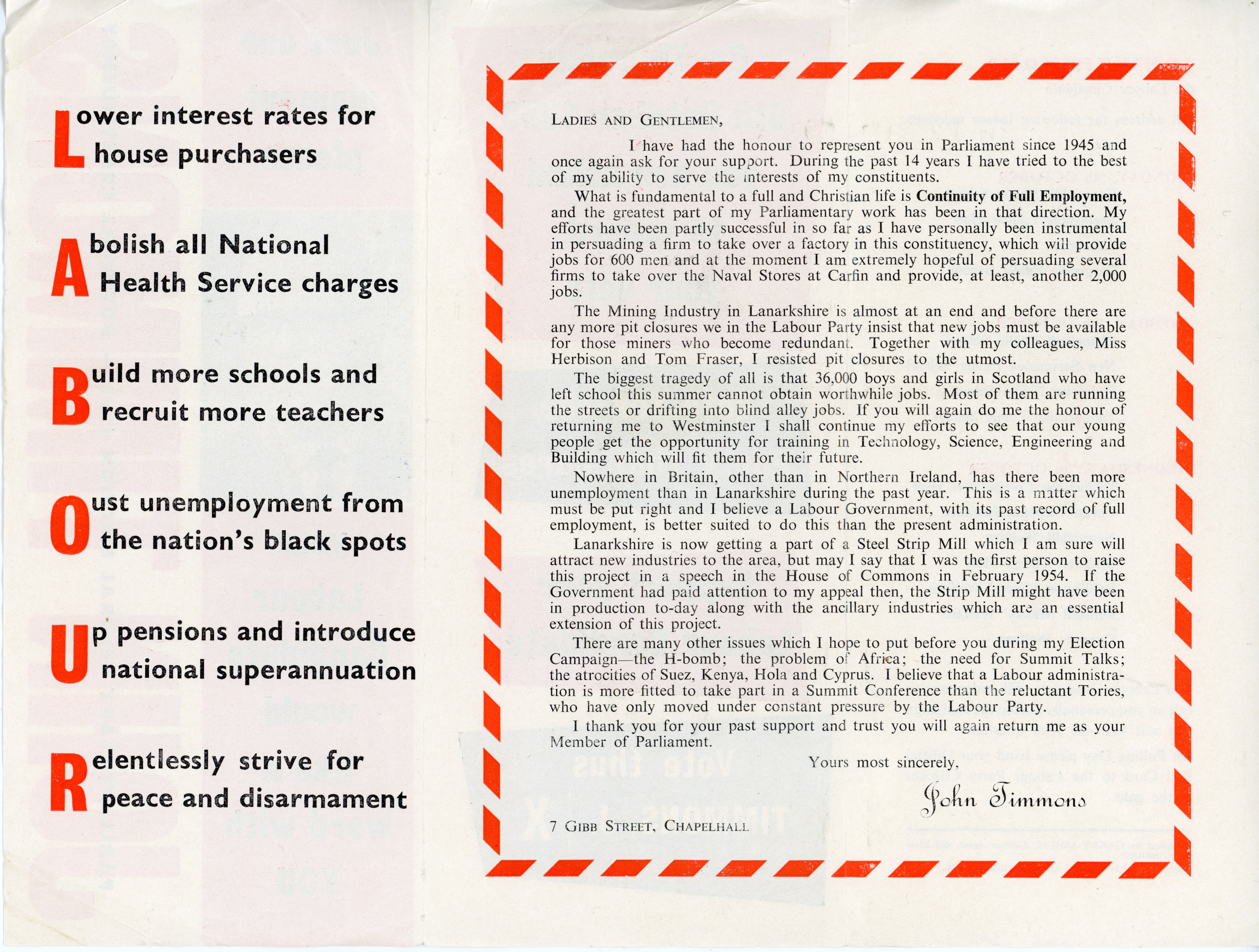
John Timmons M.P. 1959 Election Leaftet

== Later career ==
His rebellious tendencies eased later in the 1950s, although in 1957 he joined a group calling for no retreat on the policy of nationalisation. He played his part in ensuring that the contract for the Queen Elizabeth 2 liner went to the Clyde shipyards rather than the Tyne. Timmons further served the people of Lanarkshire as a magistrate and Justice of the Peace. Unwell in the early 1960s, he announced his intention not to contest the next election in 1962 and retired from Parliament at the 1964 general election, dying only a month later.

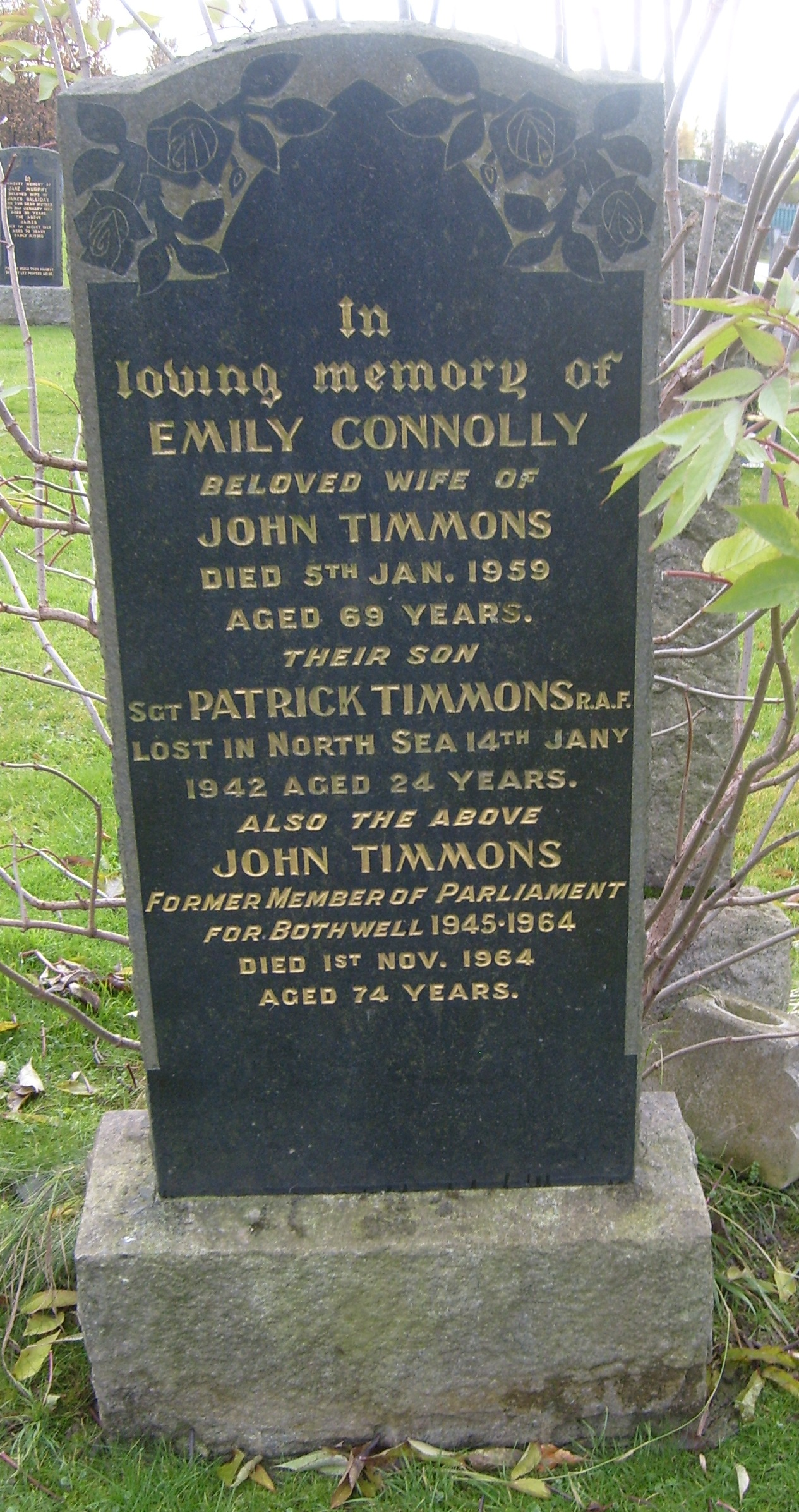
The Grave of John Timmons and his wife Emily. St Patricks Cemetery, New Stevenson

Parliament of the United Kingdom
Preceded by James C. Welsh	Member of Parliament for Bothwell; 1945–1964	Succeeded by James Hamilton
