= Christina Marshall Colville =

Scottish temperance leader (1852–1936)

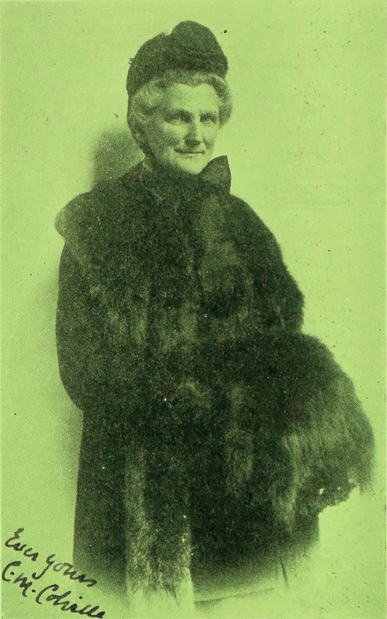
- Born: Christian Downie; April 10, 1852; Copley, West Riding of Yorkshire, England
- Died: January 7, 1936 (aged 83)
- Occupation: temperance activist
- Organization: British Women’s Temperance Association (Scottish Christian Union)
- Spouse: John Colville (m. 1885; died 1901)

Christina Marshall Colville (née, Christian Downie; April 10, 1852 – January 7, 1936) was a Scottish temperance leader. She served as president of the British Women's Temperance Association (BWTA) (Scottish Christian Union).

== Biography ==
Christian Downie was born at Copley, West Riding of Yorkshire, April 10, 1852. Her father was Provost Downie, J.P., of Kirkintilloch.

She was educated in private schools and at Glasgow Free Normal College.

On August 31, 1885, she married John Colville (1852–1901), M.P., of Motherwell, who was an active temperance worker.

Colville worked in the temperance field for many years, and was prominent in various temperance societies. She served as president of the BWTA (Scottish Christian Union), having been elected to that office in 1915. She was also president of the Lanarkshire Christian Union, president of the Motherwell United Evangelistic Association, a director of the Scottish Temperance League, and a member of the executive committee of the Lanarkshire branch of the Red Cross. She took an active part in evangelistic work at home and devoted a great deal of time to foreign missions.

Her home was at Cleland, North Lanarkshire, Scotland. Christina Colville died January 7, 1936.

== Honours ==
In 1918, during World War I, an ambulance named in Colville's honour, the "Christian Colville", was donated by the BWTA to the Scottish Women's Hospitals for Foreign Service.
