= Donald Crawford =

Scottish advocate and MP

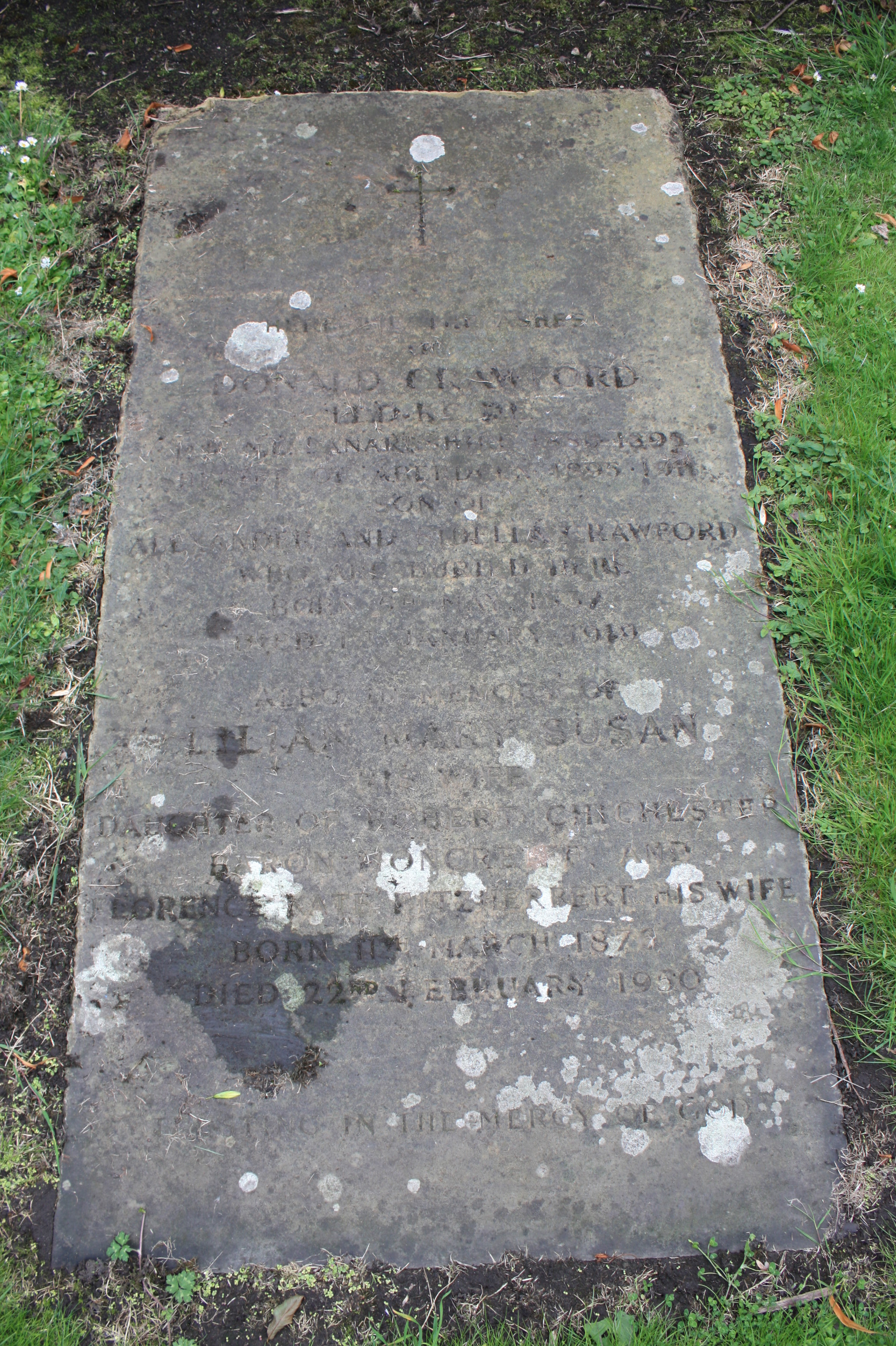
The grave of Donald Crawford, St Cuthbert's churchyard, Edinburgh

Donald Crawford KC FRSE (5 May 1837–1 January 1919) was a Scottish advocate who became a United Kingdom Liberal MP. He sat for the constituency of Lanarkshire North-East from 1885 to 1895.

== Life ==
He was born on 3 May 1837, the son of Alexander Crawford of Edinburgh and his wife, Sibella Maclean. He was educated at Edinburgh Academy from 1847 to 1854, and attended Glasgow, Oxford and Heidelberg Universities. At Oxford, he studied at Balliol College from 1856 and was awarded a B.A. in 1860; his M.A. was granted in 1864. He became a Fellow of Lincoln College in 1861, retaining his Fellowship until 1882.

Crawford was made an advocate in 1862 and, from 1880 to 1885, served as Secretary to the Lord Advocate of Scotland.

In 1873, he was elected a Fellow of the Royal Society of Edinburgh. His proposers were Robert William Thomson, Thomas Croxen Archer, Francis Deas and John Hutton Balfour.

In 1884, the Liberal President of the Local Government Board, Sir Charles Dilke, appointed Crawford to the Boundary Commission for Scotland, which was responsible for redrafting constituency boundaries in the wake of the Third Reform Act. At the time, Crawford was the political secretary to Sir John Balfour, then the Lord Advocate. In addition, Crawford was a distant relative of Dilke. The Conservative Leader in the House of Commons, Sir Stafford Northcote, objected to Crawford's appointment on those grounds, noting that Crawford was "a keen Liberal with a thorough knowledge of Scotland."

Crawford entered parliament the next year as a member for North East Lanarkshire, which was a new constituency, created by the Boundary Commission's division of North Lanarkshire into two new constituencies, the other being North West Lanarkshire.

He served as Sheriff of Aberdeen from 1895 to 1911. In 1903, he was made a King's Counsel (KC). In 1909, Aberdeen University awarded him an honorary doctorate (LLD).

Crawford is buried beneath a large flat stone in the central section of the graveyard at St Cuthbert's Church, Edinburgh.

== Family ==
Crawford was firstly married to Virginia Mary Smith (1862–1948), but the union was brief and unhappy. In 1886, Crawford achieved much social and public notoriety when he sued for divorce, and named Dilke as the co-respondent. After a much-publicised trial, Crawford obtained a decree nisi and the marriage was dissolved in 1886. As for Dilke, the scandal wrecked a promising political career. Virginia Crawford later converted to Roman Catholicism and joined the Catholic Women's League.

In old age (1914), Crawford married the Hon. Lilian Mary Susan Moncrieff.

== Notes ==
- Leigh Rayment's Historical List of MPs – Constituencies beginning with "L" (part 1)

Parliament of the United Kingdom
New constituency	Member of Parliament for North East Lanarkshire; 1885–1895	Succeeded by John Colville
