= Alexander Findlay (politician) =

Scottish Liberal Party politician (1844–1921)

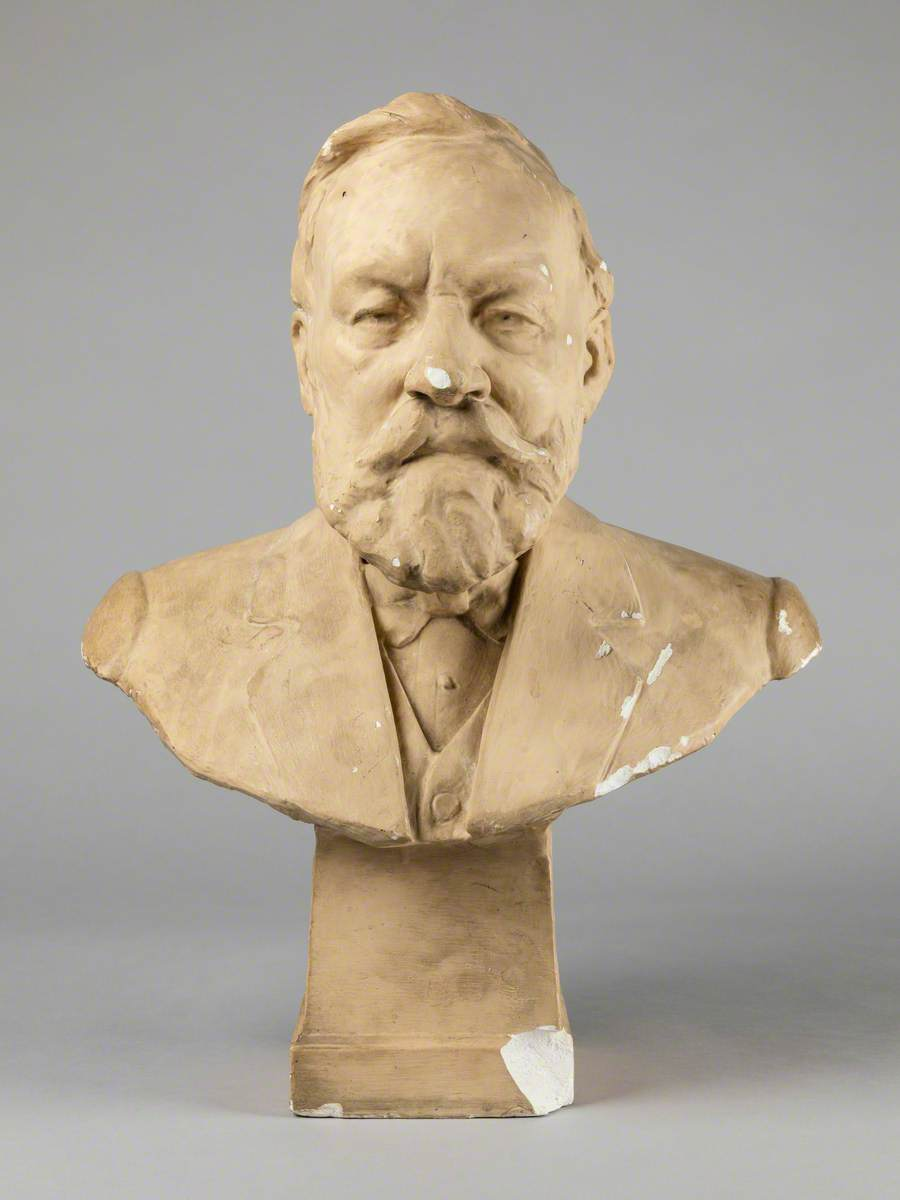
- Bust of Findlay c. 1919 by John Sharp

Member of Parliament
- In office 1904–1910

Personal details
- Born: 25 November 1844 United Kingdom
- Died: 2 February 1921 (aged 76) United Kingdom
- Party: Liberal Party
- Occupation: Industrialist, Politician

Alexander Findlay (25 November 1844 – 2 February 1921) was a Scottish Liberal Party politician and industrialist. He founded Alexander Findlay & Company, a structural engineering company based at Parkneuk Works, Motherwell, in 1888. A prominent figure in local business and political life, he served as Provost of Motherwell 1901–1904. He was elected as the Member of Parliament (MP) for North East Lanarkshire at a by-election in 1904, and was re-elected in 1906. He stood down at the January 1910 general election.

Parliament of the United Kingdom
Preceded by Sir William Henry Rattigan	Member of Parliament for North East Lanarkshire; 1904 – January 1910	Succeeded by Thomas Fleming Wilson
