= William Ratigan =

American writer

William Ratigan (1910–1984) was an American writer, journalist, historian, and novelist who wrote mainly about Great Lakes history, culture, and folklore (specifically maritime history).

Ratigan was born in Detroit, Michigan to a Great Lakes steamboat engineer who had been sailing on the Lakes since the age of 12. He attended the University of Detroit from 1931 to 1933, and graduated from the University of Tennessee Chattanooga in 1935. He would later go back to school and receive his M.A. in 1961 and his Ph.D. in 1963, both from Michigan State University.

During World War II, Ratigan was employed by the National Broadcasting Company (NBC) to cover the Pacific Theatre, serving as NBC news director and supervisor of war correspondents and commentators in the Pacific Theatre of Operations. He would go on to be named "Best All-Around Newsman in the World" by Radio Life Magazine. In conjunction with his journalism work, he would also frequently teach and lecture at universities around the country. In recognition of his writing, he was appointed a Member at Large to the Advisory Council on Naval Affairs, and also served as a consultant to the Smithsonian Institution on the technical development of Great Lakes sailing vessels.

Ratigan made his home in Charlevoix, Michigan for much of his life, where he operated a small used bookstore in a fish shanty called The Dockside Press. In his latter years, he would spend winters in Dunedin, Florida. Ratigan's home in Charlevoix was located at 223 Park Avenue, which was known as "Main Street" during the first part of the 20th century.

== Bibliography ==
- Soo Canal! (1954)
- Young Mister Big (1955)
- “Hiawatha and America’s Mightiest Mile” (1955)
- The Adventures of Captain McCargo (1956)
- Straits of Mackinac! (1957)
- The Great Lakes Trilogy of American Folktales:
  - Blue Snow (1958)
  - Adventures of Paul Bunyan and Babe (1958)
  - Tiny Tim Pine (1958)
- Highways over Broad Waters (1959)
- The Long Crossing (1959)
- Great Lakes Shipwrecks and Survivals (1960, 1969, 1977)
