= Cyril Rattigan =

English cricketer and British Army officer

Personal information
- Full name: Cyril Stanley Rattigan
- Born: 5 August 1884; Camberwell, Surrey, England
- Died: 13 November 1916 (aged 32); Beaumont-Hamel, Somme, France
- Batting: Right-handed
- Bowling: Right-arm medium

Domestic team information
- Years: Team
- 1906–1907: Cambridge University
- 1908: Marylebone Cricket Club

Career statistics
Competition	First-class
Matches	7
Runs scored	183
Batting average	20.33
100s/50s	–/–
Top score	42
Balls bowled	444
Wickets	5
Bowling average	43.40
5 wickets in innings	–
10 wickets in match	–
Best bowling	3/61
Catches/stumpings	3/–
- Source: Cricinfo, 5 October 2020

Cyril Stanley Rattigan (5 August 1884 – 13 November 1916) was an English first-class cricketer, civil servant and British Army officer.

The son of the judge and politician Sir William Henry Rattigan, he was born at Camberwell in August 1884. He was educated at Harrow School, where he was a talented runner who competed three times in the 200 and twice in the 100 yards, in addition to being runner-up for the school in rackets two years in succession. From Harrow, he went up to Trinity College, Cambridge. While studying at Cambridge, he played first-class cricket for Cambridge University from 1906 and 1907, making six appearances. He scored 146 runs for Cambridge, averaging 18.25 with a high score of 42. With his right-arm medium pace bowling he took 5 wickets with best figures of 3 for 61. His interests outside of cricket while at Cambridge included golf. Having graduated from Cambridge in 1907, Rattigan made a final first-class appearance for the Marylebone Cricket Club against Cambridge University at Lord's in 1908.

Rattigan was appointed an honorary attaché in His Majesty's Diplomatic Service at Tangier in 1909, where he accompanied Sir Reginald Lister on his mission to Fez. He later served in the First World War and was commissioned as a second lieutenant in the Royal Fusiliers in September 1914, with promotion to lieutenant following in February 1915. By September 1915, he had been promoted to captain. He served on the Western Front with D Company 7th Royal Fusiliers and was killed by a sniper on 13 November 1916, while attempting to retrieve an injured comrade in no man's land near the French village of Beaumont-Hamel. His brother was Sir Henry Adolphus Rattigan, the Chief Justice of the Lahore High Court.
