= Bothwell (UK Parliament constituency) =

Parliamentary constituency in the United Kingdom, 1918–1983

- Former county constituency for the House of Commons
- Subdivision: Lanarkshire

1918–1983
- Seats: One
- Created from: North West Lanarkshire and North East Lanarkshire
- Replaced by: Motherwell North, Glasgow Shettleston, Hamilton, Monklands East and Monklands West

Bothwell was a county constituency in Lanarkshire represented in the House of Commons of the Parliament of the United Kingdom from 1918 to 1983. It was formed by the division of Lanarkshire constituency.

== Boundaries ==
From 1918 the constituency consisted of "The part of the Middle Ward County District which is contained within the parishes of Old Monkland and Bothwell, exclusive of all burghs or portions of burghs situated therein."

The Representation of the People Act 1948 provided that the constituency was to consist of "The sixth district, the electoral divisions of Baillieston, Mount Vernon and Carmyle, Springboig and Garrowhill in the ninth district and that part of the electoral division of Old Monkland in the said ninth district which is bounded on the North by the city of Glasgow and the burgh of Coatbridge, on the West by the electoral division of Baillieston and on the South and East by the electoral divisions of Tannochside and Bellshill North."

== Members of Parliament ==
Election	Member	Party
1918	David MacDonald	Unionist
1919 by-election	John Robertson	Labour
1926 by-election	Joseph Sullivan	Labour
1931	Helen Shaw	Unionist
1935	James C. Welsh	Labour
1945	John Timmons	Labour
1964	James Hamilton	Labour
1983	constituency abolished	

== Election results ==
=== Elections in the 1910s ===
General election 1918: Bothwell
Party		Candidate	Votes	%
C	Unionist	David MacDonald	9,359	50.9
	Labour	John Robertson	9,027	49.1
Majority			332	1.8
Turnout			18,386	69.2
Registered electors			26,572	
	Unionist win (new seat)			
C indicates candidate endorsed by the coalition government.

1919 Bothwell by-election
Party		Candidate	Votes	%	±%
	Labour	John Robertson	13,135	68.8	+19.7
C	National Liberal	James Moffat	5,967	31.2	N/A
Majority			7,168	37.6	N/A
Turnout			19,102	71.9	+2.7
Registered electors			26,572		
	Labour gain from Unionist		Swing		
C indicates candidate endorsed by the coalition government.

=== Elections in the 1920s ===
General election 1922: Bothwell
Party	Candidate	Votes	%	±%
Labour	John Robertson	13,872	57.0	+7.9
Unionist	Peter Denniston Ridge-Beedle	10,484	43.0	−7.9
Majority		3,388	14.0	N/A
Turnout		24,356	78.2	+9.0
Registered electors		31,149		
Labour gain from Unionist		Swing	+7.9	

General election 1923: Bothwell
Party	Candidate	Votes	%	±%
Labour	John Robertson	14,211	60.2	+3.2
Unionist	Peter Denniston Ridge-Beedle	7,569	32.0	−11.0
Liberal	John Dick Scott	1,846	7.8	New
Majority		6,642	28.2	+14.2
Turnout		23,626	73.1	−5.1
Registered electors		32,342		
Labour hold		Swing	+7.1	

General election 1924: Bothwell
Party	Candidate	Votes	%	±%
Labour	John Robertson	14,591	56.3	−3.9
Unionist	Helen Shaw	11,314	43.7	+11.7
Majority		3,277	12.6	−15.6
Turnout		25,905	79.3	+6.2
Registered electors		32,665		
Labour hold		Swing	−7.8	

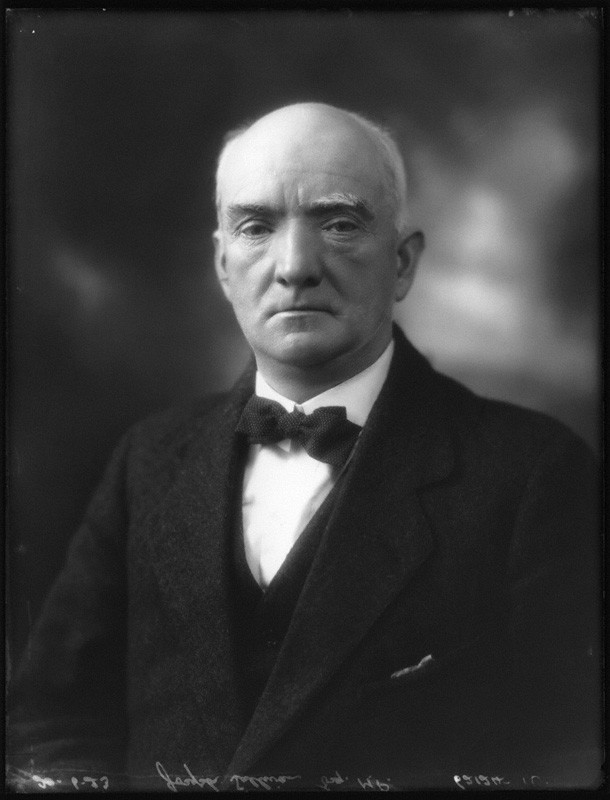
Joseph Sullivan

1926 Bothwell by-election
Party	Candidate	Votes	%	±%
Labour	Joseph Sullivan	14,830	59.7	+3.4
Unionist	Alexander Morrice Mackay	8,740	35.2	−8.5
Liberal	Ernest Young	1,276	5.1	New
Majority		6,090	24.5	+11.9
Turnout		24,846	74.2	−5.1
Registered electors		33,505		
Labour hold		Swing	+6.0	

General election 1929: Bothwell
Party	Candidate	Votes	%	±%
Labour	Joseph Sullivan	17,006	55.2	−1.1
Unionist	Helen Shaw	12,077	39.3	−4.4
Communist	Helen Crawfurd	1,677	5.5	New
Majority		4,929	15.9	+3.3
Turnout		30,760	72.7	−6.6
Registered electors		42,312		
Labour hold		Swing	+1.7	

=== Elections in the 1930s ===
General election 1931: Bothwell
Party	Candidate	Votes	%	±%
Unionist	Helen Shaw	16,571	49.98	
Labour	Joseph Sullivan	14,423	43.50	
Communist	Barney McCourt	2,163	6.52	
Majority		2,148	6.48	N/A
Turnout		33,157	77.71	
Unionist gain from Labour		Swing		

General election 1935: Bothwell
Party	Candidate	Votes	%	±%
Labour	James Welsh	20,900	60.30	
Unionist	Helen Shaw	13,761	39.70	
Majority		7,139	20.60	N/A
Turnout		34,661	78.64	
Labour gain from Unionist		Swing		

=== Elections in the 1940s ===
General election 1945: Bothwell
Party	Candidate	Votes	%	±%
Labour	John Timmons	25,369	65.8	+5.5
Unionist	Helen Shaw	13,207	34.2	−5.5
Majority		12,162	31.6	+11.0
Turnout		38,576	73.12	−5.52
Labour hold		Swing		

=== Elections in the 1950s ===
General election 1950: Bothwell
Party	Candidate	Votes	%	±%
Labour	John Timmons	25,715	56.7	−9.1
Unionist	Norman Cadzow	19,605	43.3	+9.1
Majority		6,110	13.4	−8.2
Turnout		45,320	84.54	+11.42
Labour hold		Swing		

General election 1951: Bothwell
Party	Candidate	Votes	%	±%
Labour	John Timmons	26,529	56.3	−0.4
Unionist	Norman Cadzow	20,591	43.7	+0.4
Majority		5,938	12.60	−0.8
Turnout		47,120	85.96	+1.42
Labour hold		Swing		

General election 1955: Bothwell
Party	Candidate	Votes	%	±%
Labour	John Timmons	23,365	54.2	−2.1
Unionist	William Graham Greig	19,755	45.8	+2.1
Majority		3,610	8.37	−4.23
Turnout		43,120	78.93	−7.03
Labour hold		Swing		

General election 1959: Bothwell
Party	Candidate	Votes	%	±%
Labour	John Timmons	25,119	54.7	+0.5
Unionist	William Graham Greig	20,767	45.3	−0.5
Majority		4,352	9.4	+1.0
Turnout		45,886	82.17	+3.24
Labour hold		Swing		

=== Elections in the 1960s ===
General election 1964: Bothwell
Party	Candidate	Votes	%	±%
Labour	James Hamilton	27,556	60.4	+5.7
Conservative	James Brown Highgate	18,068	39.6	−5.7
Majority		9,488	20.80	+11.4
Turnout		45,624	80.44	−1.73
Labour hold		Swing		

General election 1966: Bothwell
Party	Candidate	Votes	%	±%
Labour	James Hamilton	27,166	61.0	+0.6
Conservative	James Brown Highgate	16,198	36.3	−0.7
Communist	Thomas Woods	1,209	2.7	New
Majority		10,968	24.7	+3.9
Turnout		44,573	77.78	−2.66
Labour hold		Swing		

=== Elections in the 1970s ===
General election 1970: Bothwell
Party	Candidate	Votes	%	±%
Labour	James Hamilton	26,431	54.7	−6.3
Conservative	James Brown Highgate	15,720	32.5	−3.8
SNP	Tom McAlpine	6,157	12.8	New
Majority		10,711	22.17	−2.4
Turnout		42,151	75.32	−2.46
Labour hold		Swing		

General election February 1974: Bothwell
Party	Candidate	Votes	%	±%
Labour	James Hamilton	22,326	46.8	−7.9
Conservative	David McAllister	12,725	26.7	−5.8
SNP	Gerald Alexander Fisher	6,710	14.1	+1.3
Liberal	James Park	5,362	11.2	New
Communist	David Bolton	562	1.2	New
Majority		9,601	20.13	−2.04
Turnout		47,685	81.22	+5.90
Labour hold		Swing		

General election October 1974: Bothwell
Party	Candidate	Votes	%	±%
Labour	James Hamilton	22,086	48.64	+1.82
SNP	John McCool	11,138	24.53	+10.46
Conservative	David Anderson Roser	8,125	17.89	−8.79
Liberal	Terry Grieve	4,057	8.93	−2.31
Majority		10,948	24.11	+3.98
Turnout		45,406	76.50	−4.72
Labour hold		Swing	-4.32	

General election 1979: Bothwell
Party	Candidate	Votes	%	±%
Labour	James Hamilton	26,492	54.97	+6.33
Conservative	James Lang Patrick Scott	11,275	23.40	+5.51
Liberal	Terry Grieve	5,225	10.84	+1.91
SNP	John McCool	5,202	10.79	−13.74
Majority		15,217	31.57	+7.46
Turnout		48,194	78.61	+2.11
Labour hold		Swing	+0.41	

== See also ==
- 1919 Bothwell by-election
- 1926 Bothwell by-election
- Bothwell
