= Henry Adolphus Rattigan =

British judge in India

Sir Henry Adolphus Byden Rattigan (11 October 1864 – 11 January 1920) was a barrister and judge in British India. He served as the Chief Justice of the Chief Court of the Punjab, which became the Lahore High Court.

== Biography ==
Henry Rattigan was born in Delhi, British India, the son of Sir William Henry Rattigan and Teresa Higgins. He was educated in England at Harrow School and later Balliol College, Oxford. Thereafter he was called to the Bar at Lincoln's Inn in 1874.

In 1889, Rattigan returned to India and enrolled as an advocate at the Chief Court of the Punjab. In 1900 he was made Legal Remembrancer to the Punjab government. He served as a Judge of the Chief Court of the Punjab from 1909 and in 1917 was made Chief Justice. He was knighted in 1918 and remained as Chief Justice until 1920 when he died in Lahore.

Rattigan published a number of notable works including Tribal Laws of the Punjab (1895) and Laws of Divorce in India (1897). His brother was the first-class cricketer Cyril Stanley Rattigan, who was killed in action during the First World War.

Rattigan Road in Lahore, Pakistan is named after him.
