= William Rattigan =

Sir William Henry Rattigan, KC (4 September 1842 – 4 July 1904) was a British lawyer, judge, legal writer, and Liberal Unionist MP for North East Lanarkshire.

== Life and career ==
Rattigan was born in Delhi, India, in September 1842, the son of Bartholomew Rattigan, of Athy, Co. Kildare. He was educated at the High School, Agra. After a short period in the uncovenanted Bombay civil service, Rattigan resigned to pursue a legal career. He became a pleader of the Punjab chief court on its establishment in 1866 and built a large practice. He entered Lincoln's Inn in 1871, was called to the bar there in 1873, also studying at King's College London. He later received a doctorate (LL.D) from the University of Göttingen.

Most of his legal career took place in India. He served as judge in the Chief Court of the Punjab on four occasions, was knighted in 1895, took silk in 1897 and practiced in the High Court of the North Western Provinces. He was also an additional member of the supreme legislative council of India 1892–93, and member of the Punjab legislative council 1898–99.

In 1887 he was Vice-Chancellor of Punjab University, from which he later received an honorary doctorate (LL.D). An honorary doctorate (LL.D) from the University of Glasgow followed in June 1901.

After moving back to the United Kingdom in 1900, Rattigan practiced before the Privy Council and contested the North East Lanarkshire constituency in the general election 1900, but lost to the incumbent, John Colville. When the latter died the following year, Rattigan contested and won a by-election for the same constituency in September 1901, and held it until his death in London three years later.

Rattigan died in a motor accident on 4 July 1904, at age 61.

== Family ==
Rattigan married, in 1878, Evelyn Higgins, daughter of Colonel A. Higgins, CIE. His son Sir Henry Adolphus Rattigan later achieved note as the Chief Justice of the Lahore High Court, while his youngest son Cyril Stanley Rattigan played first-class cricket and was killed in action during the First World War.

== Publications ==
- The Roman Law of Persons, 1873
- The Science of Jurisprudence, 1892
- Private International Law, 1895
- Digest of Customary Law for Punjab, 1895

== Notes ==
- https://www.oxforddnb.com/display/10.1093/ref:odnb/9780198614128.001.0001/odnb-9780198614128-e-35680

Parliament of the United Kingdom
Preceded by John Colville	Member of Parliament for North East Lanarkshire; 1901–1904	Succeeded by Alexander Findlay
