= David MacDonald (British politician) =

British politician

David Henderson MacDonald (c. 1857 – 22 June 1919) was briefly the Conservative MP for Bothwell in Lanarkshire, Scotland. He was elected MP for Bothwell at the 1918 General Election after defeating the Labour candidate John Robertson by 322 votes, becoming the first MP from Bothwell. MacDonald did not serve long as an MP, as he died in June 1919 (at age 61), after just 176 days in office. Robertson went on to win the ensuing by-election.

== See also ==
- List of United Kingdom MPs with the shortest service

Parliament of the United Kingdom
New constituency	Member of Parliament for Bothwell; 1918–1919	Succeeded by John Robertson
