= John Robertson (Bothwell MP) =

John Robertson MBE
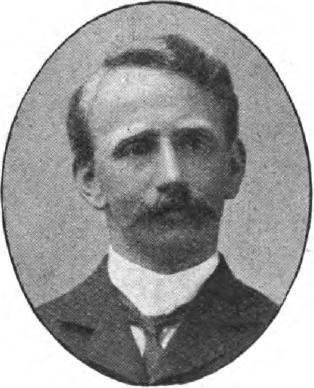
- Robertson in the mid-1900s

Lord Commissioner of the Treasury
- In office 2 February 1924 – 4 November 1924
- Prime Minister: Ramsay MacDonald

Member of Parliament for Bothwell
- In office 29 July 1919 – 14 February 1926
- Preceded by: David MacDonald
- Succeeded by: Joseph Sullivan

Personal details
- Born: John Robertson; 1867
- Died: 14 February 1926 (aged 58–59)
- Party: Labour

John Robertson MBE (1867 – 14 February 1926) was a Labour Party politician in the United Kingdom.

== Early life and career ==
He began work in the coal mines at age 11, eventually becoming Chairman of the Scottish Miners' Union.

== Political career ==
He was unsuccessful parliamentary candidate for the Bothwell constituency in Lanarkshire at the 1918 general election. In the 1919 by-election, he was elected as Member of Parliament, holding the seat until his death at age 59.

He served as a Lord Commissioner of the Treasury, in the short-lived Labour government of 1924.

== Personal life ==
He was awarded the MBE in 1918.

Parliament of the United Kingdom
Preceded by David MacDonald	Member of Parliament for Bothwell; 1919–1926	Succeeded by Joseph Sullivan
Trade union offices
Preceded by John Weir	Treasurer of the Scottish Miners' Federation; 1908–1914	Succeeded by William Adamson
Preceded by Robert Smillie	President of the Scottish Miners' Federation; 1918–1920	Succeeded by Hugh Murnin
Preceded by A. B. Hall and Charles Hobson	Auditor of the Trades Union Congress; 1919; With: Ben Smith	Succeeded by Walter Smith and William Straker
