= Greenock by-election =

Greenock by-election may refer to one of six by-elections for the British House of Commons constituency of Greenock, in Renfrewshire, Scotland:

- Greenock by-election, 1845
- 1878 Greenock by-election
- Greenock by-election, 1884
- 1936 Greenock by-election
- 1941 Greenock by-election
- 1955 Greenock by-election

== See also ==
- Greenock (UK Parliament constituency)
