= Halley Stewart =

English businessman, journalist, philanthropist and Liberal Party politician

- Halley Stewart, c. 1900

Member of Parliament for Greenock
- In office 1906 - January 1910

Member of Parliament for Spalding
- In office 1887 - 1895

Personal details
- Born: 18 January 1838 Barnet, Hertfordshire, England
- Died: 26 January 1937 (aged 99) Harpenden, Hertfordshire, England
- Party: Liberal
- Spouse: Elizabeth Atkinson (m. 1865; died 1924)
- Children: 8, including Percy and Bernard
- Relatives: Harold Charles Stewart (grandson)

Sir Halley Stewart (18 January 1838 – 26 January 1937) was an English businessman, journalist, philanthropist and Liberal Party politician who sat as a Member of Parliament (MP) from 1887 to 1895 and again from 1906 to 1910.

== Family and education ==
Halley Stewart was born at Barnet in Hertfordshire, the son of the Reverend Alex Stewart, a Congregational minister, one of eleven children, five brothers and five sisters. He was educated at the schools his father ran, first in Barnet and later in Holloway a little further to the south. In 1865 he married (Jane) Elizabeth Atkinson from Upper Norwood in south east London. Elizabeth Stewart died in 1924. They had seven sons (only two of whom survived their father) and a daughter. One of Stewart's surviving sons was Sir (Percy) Malcolm Stewart Bt. (1872–1951), the brick and cement manufacturer. He too was a benefactor of the arts bequeathing many pictures, tapestries, furniture, and objets d'art to the National Trust. One of Halley Stewart's great-grandsons, Ian Stewart followed him into Parliament, albeit as a Conservative rather than a Liberal.

== Career ==
=== Preaching ===
Stewart followed his father in preaching the Christian message, although he was never ordained as a minister. From 1863–1874 he was the pastor of Croft Church, Hastings in East Sussex and from 1874–77 of Caledonian Road Church in Islington, north London.

=== Business ===
Stewart started his working life in banking and for some years was employed in a London banking house, Robert Davies and Co. in Shoreditch as a clerk. He then worked as a clerk in a coal factors and at Smith & Co. brewers in Hastings. In 1870, Stewart set up a business venture, Stewart Brothers and Spencer, oil-seed crushers and refiners based in London and Rochester in Kent. He sold this company in 1900 and transferred his business interests to the manufacture of bricks, first through the firms of B J H Forder Ltd. originally a small works on the Gault at Westoning, later taking larger premises at Wootton Pillinge, later renamed Stewartby after the Stewart family. In 1923 Stewart merged Forders with the London Brick Company, of which he eventually became the vice-chairman.

=== Journalism ===
Stewart maintained his connections with Hastings, however, and in 1877 founded and became the first editor of the newspaper the Hastings and St Leonards Times. He did not sell the paper until 1883.

== Philanthropy ==
Stewart's charitable works were inspired by his nonconformist faith and he gave a lot of money to the Congregationalist Church. Towards the end of 1924 he set up the Halley Stewart Trust for Research towards the Christian Ideal in all Social Life, to promote religion, education and the relief of poverty. His trust donated money to important medical research into asthma, cancer and multiple sclerosis but one of its most important contributions was to sponsor the scientific research of Professor Edward Victor Appleton, of King's College London, whose contributions to the knowledge of the ionosphere led to the crucial wartime innovation of radar. He also gave money to the district council at Harpenden in Hertfordshire towards the purchase of the manorial rights of the common and his residence The Red House with land and cottages to be used by the town as a hospital after his death.

The trust is now known as the Sir Halley Stewart Trust, and assists innovative developments in research, social & development, and medical fields in the UK and Africa.

== Politics ==
=== Political stance ===
Stewart had a reputation as an advanced Liberal and Radical. He was a supporter of women's suffrage, land reform, the abolition of the hereditary element from the House of Lords and ending state aid to teaching of religious education in schools, being sometime president of the Society for the Liberation of Religion from State Patronage and Control, and president of the Secular Education League. He also strongly supported the Gladstonian policy of Irish Home Rule. He spoke in favour of the establishment of a Parliament for Ireland at a meeting of the British Home Rule Association in 1886 with other notable Liberals including Henry Labouchère and later travelled in Ireland and spoke on the subject and the need to redress other Irish grievances .

=== Candidate ===
Stewart felt his Congregational pulpit was a suitable place from which to expound his political views, acknowledging the overlap of religious and political objectives in the improvement of social conditions and the duty of religious teachers to inform their congregations on public affairs, so they could better influence the lawmakers. The church did not agree however and Stewart moved into direct political activity. His first duties were as an election agent for Liberal Party candidates in East Sussex in the campaign leading to the 1880 general election. He was involved in the organisation of campaigns but also, no doubt drawing on the experience of years of preaching, as a speaker on behalf of candidates. Thanks to his success as a public speaker, he was invited in the spring of 1884 to make a speech at Boston in Lincolnshire in support of a friend William Ingram. Through this connection, Stewart was later associated as one of the Liberal candidates at Boston. He never fought the seat because it lost its two member status for the 1885 general election. He was also linked with the other south Lincolnshire seat of Stamford before transferring his allegiance to new seat of Spalding where he stood unsuccessfully at the general elections of 1885 and 1886.

=== MP ===
However, in 1887, the sitting Unionist MP, Murray Finch-Hatton, went to the House of Lords as Earl of Winchelsea in succession to his brother, causing a by-election. Stewart won the contest by an unexpectedly comfortable margin of 747 votes compared to his loss by 288 in 1886, delighting party colleagues who thought it a great blow to the government. His opponent, admiral George Tryon had returned from a 2-year tour of duty in Australia only one month before and it was considered his lack of agricultural experience had counted against him. Stewart held the seat at the 1892 general election with a reduced majority but lost in 1895.

=== Back into Parliament ===
In May 1900 Stewart was selected as the Liberal candidate for Peterborough, in preference to the former Peterborough MP Alpheus Morton, who had been nursing the seat since his defeat in 1895. Stewart was unsuccessful at the 1900 general election, but three years later he was selected as Liberal candidate for the Scottish constituency of Greenock in the historic county of Renfrewshire and contested the 1906 general election there. He was elected and remained as MP for the constituency until he retired from the House of Commons at the January 1910 election.

== Honours and appointments ==
In 1911, Stewart was one of the large number of names on a list of potential peers which prime minister H H Asquith drew up during the constitutional crisis around the People's Budget and the Parliament Act. Asquith had persuaded the King to create hundreds of new peers to flood the House of Lords and ensure the passage of the Parliament Bill if the Tory peers continued to block the legislation in defiance of the elected House of Commons. In the event, the Conservative peers conceded defeat and Asquith's list was not needed. However, in 1932, at the age of 93, Stewart was created a Knight Bachelor in the New Year's Honours list for philanthropic and social services, and was elected a Fellow of King's College, London in 1936. He also served as a Justice of the Peace for the County of Sussex from 1891.

From 1927 George Allen Unwin, London and Macmillan and Company, New York published The Halley Stewart Lectures book series based on the annual Sir Halley Stewart Lectures.

In 1954 Spalding United renamed their Black Swan ground in his honour.

== Death ==
Stewart died at his home, the Red House in Carlton Road, Harpenden, Hertfordshire, on 26 January 1937. He had been ill with influenza and developed bronchitis and was 99 years old.

Parliament of the United Kingdom
Preceded by Murray Finch-Hamilton	Member of Parliament for Spalding; 1887–1895	Succeeded by Harry Frederick Pollock
Preceded by James Reid	Member of Parliament for Greenock; 1906–January 1910	Succeeded by Godfrey Collins
