= Greenock and Inverclyde =

Greenock and Inverclyde may refer to:

- Greenock and Inverclyde (UK Parliament constituency)
- Greenock and Inverclyde (Scottish Parliament constituency)
