= Bernard Stewart =

Bernard Stewart or Stuart may refer to:

- Lord Bernard Stewart (1623–1645), Scottish aristocrat and Royalist commander in the English Civil War
- Bernard Stewart, 3rd Lord of Aubigny (c. 1452–1508), French soldier and diplomat
- Bernard Denis Stewart (1900-1988), Australian Catholic bishop
- Bernard Halley Stewart, British physician
- Bernard Stewart, alias used by Ernie O'Malley (1897–1957), Irish Republican Army officer, upon his capture
- Bernard Stuart, 18th century abbot of Scots Monastery, Regensburg
