= John Bruce (barrister) =

Scottish barrister (1861–1921)

John Bruce (1 January 1861 – 29 January 1921) was a Scottish barrister and farmer who was briefly member of the UK Parliament for Greenock, before being unseated by an electoral petition.

== Biography ==
John Bruce was a Scottish barrister and farmer, son of James Bruce of Oldmeldrum, Aberdeenshire. He was a student at Aberdeen University in the 1880s, where he was reputed one of the leading liberals amongst his cohort, and a member of the debating society.

Bruce was elected as a Liberal Party candidate in the 1892 general election ballot for Greenock. On the first count he was found to have a majority of 44. However a petition under the terms of the Parliamentary Elections Act 1868 by Sir Thomas Sutherland was heard at the start of August 1892, and judgement was made by Lord Rutherfurd-Clark and Lord Adam that an error had been made; that Sutherland had won a majority of 55, and that he should therefore be seated as MP. The judgement was read to the House of Commons on 9 August 1892 and accepted by the speaker. Bruce was described as a Gladstonian-Liberal; Sutherland as a Liberal-Unionist.

Bruce was again adopted as the Liberal candidate in the next general election, held in 1895, but resigned his candidacy owing to ill health; he took no active part in politics thereafter, though an obituary noted that "his political views changed considerably".

Bruce was described in an obituary as being 'of Yonderton', and as 'a well-known Buchan agriculturalist'. Yonderton Farm is to the north-west of Hatton, Aberdeenshire, in the parish of Cruden, Buchan. The obituary comments that the estate of Yonderton was sold on the day before Bruce suddenly died.

Bruce died on 29 January 1921.
