= Alec Geddes =

Scottish communist activist (1888–1964)

Alexander Geddes (29 May 1888 – 10 July 1964) was a Scottish communist and political candidate. In newspaper coverage of his political activities, his first name was often shortened to Alex or Alec.

== Biography ==
Geddes was born in Wick in 1888, and worked there as a fish smoker. He married Margaret Clark Kinloch in 1909. They moved to Greenock, where he was employed in a torpedo factory during World War I. He joined the Amalgamated Engineering Union and, inspired by the Clyde Workers' Committee, became a prominent figure in the Greenock Workers' Committee. His first political speech was in the run-up to the 1918 general election, when he spoke in support of Fred Shaw, unsuccessful British Socialist Party candidate for the Greenock constituency.

Geddes attended the Communist Unity Convention of 1920 on behalf of the Greenock Workers' Committee. He advocated for a separate Scottish communist party, a view he shared with John Maclean. Geddes co-founded the Scottish Communist Party and was appointed its treasurer. However, advocates for a separate Scottish CP were defeated at its first meeting; members voted instead to seek amalgamation with the new Communist Party of Great Britain (CPGB). Geddes acceded to this plan, and became a member of the CPGB himself.

Geddes chaired the Greenock Unemployed Workers' Committee and was nominated to stand at the 1922 general election. He had the support of the CPGB, the local trades and labour council, and the Independent Labour Party (ILP). But he did not try to win the endorsement of the national Labour Party to stand as their official candidate. He took 9,776 votes, finishing second with 34.1% of the votes cast. For the 1923 election, he was again nominated by the local trades and labour council. The ILP protested what it regarded as aggressive maneuvers by "an extreme Labour-Communist section", and withdrew from the council. Nevertheless, Geddes improved his electoral result, collecting 10,335 votes, or 38% of the total.

At the 1924 general election, Geddes was once more adopted by the local trades council, but this time ran against a Labour Party candidate, who he outperformed, taking second place with 29.0%. Geddes' final contest came in 1929 when he took 20%. In these general elections, he was pitted against Liberal MP Sir Godfrey Collins, who held the Greenock seat for many years. In 1928, Geddes won election to the Greenock parish council, and served a single term.

Geddes visited the Soviet Union in 1925. He viewed the Red Army on the Polish border, and received a banner from the Samara Cavalry Division as a gift, which he presented to the CPGB. His daughter Euphemia "Effie" Geddes was a leading figure in the CPGB's "British Pioneers" children's movement. At age 22, while heading a delegation of Pioneers on a tour of the USSR, Effie became ill and died suddenly in September 1933 in Kharkov. After this loss, Geddes appears to have largely withdrawn from public life, with only occasional mention. In September 1943, he spoke at a rally in support of the war effort. In July 1945 he had a letter printed in the Greenock Telegraph in which he urged readers to back the communist candidate J. R. Campbell.

On 10 July 1964, Alexander Geddes died in a hospital in Ilford, Essex. He was 76.
