= James Reid (Greenock MP) =

British politician

James Reid (1839–1908) was a British businessman who was Unionist MP for Greenock from 1900 to 1906.

A native of Belfast, Reid was principal of Fleming, Reid, and Co., worsted and hosiery manufacturers.

He was a justice of the peace and deputy lieutenant for Renfrewshire.

Parliament of the United Kingdom
Preceded by Sir Thomas Sutherland	Member of Parliament for Greenock; 1900–1906	Succeeded by Halley Stewart
