= 1936 Greenock by-election =

UK parliamentary by-election

The 1936 Greenock by-election was a by-election held on 26 November 1936 for the UK House of Commons constituency of Greenock in Renfrewshire, Scotland.

== Vacancy ==
The seat had become vacant on 13 October 1936 when the Secretary of State for Scotland, Sir Godfrey Collins died at the age of 61. A Liberal National Party Member of Parliament (MP), he held the seat since the January 1910 general election.

== Candidates ==
The Liberal National candidate was V. E. Cornelius, who had not previously contested a parliamentary election.

His only opponent was the Labour Party candidate, 50-year-old Robert Gibson. Gibson had unsuccessfully contested one by-election and three general elections most recently at Dundee in 1935.

== Result ==
On a high turnout, the result was a victory for Gibson, who won the seat with a swing of nearly 8%. He held the seat until his resignation in 1941.

Greenock by-election, 26 November 1936
Party	Candidate	Votes	%	±%
Labour	Robert Gibson	20,594	53.4	+9.4
Liberal National	V. E. Cornelius	17,990	46.6	−6.1
Majority		2,604	6.8	N/A
Turnout		38,584	83.3	−1.1
Labour gain from Liberal National		Swing	+7.85	

== Previous election ==
General election, November 1935: Greenock
Party	Candidate	Votes	%	±%
Liberal National	Godfrey Collins	20,299	52.7	+1.6
Labour	T. Irwin	16,945	44.0	+13.3
SNP	J. L. Kinloch	1,286	3.3	New
Majority		3,354	8.7	−15.7
Turnout		38,530	84.4	+4.1
Liberal National hold		Swing	−5.9	

== See also ==
- Greenock (UK Parliament constituency)
- Greenock
- 1941 Greenock by-election
- 1955 Greenock by-election
- List of United Kingdom by-elections (1931–1950)

== Sources ==
- Craig, F. W. S. (1983) [1969]. British parliamentary election results 1918-1949 (3rd ed.). Chichester: Parliamentary Research Services. ISBN 0-900178-06-X.
- Leigh Rayment's Historical List of MPs
