= Walter Baine =

Walter Baine (1781–1851) was a Scottish merchant and Whig Party politician. He was the Member of Parliament (MP) for Greenock from 1845 to 1847.

Baine was a principal in Baine, Johnston and Company, a trading firm based in Greenock and Newfoundland.

Parliament of the United Kingdom
Preceded by Robert Wallace	Member of Parliament for Greenock; 1845–1847	Succeeded by Viscount Melgund
