= Percy Malcolm Stewart =

English industrialist and philanthropist

Sir Percy Malcolm Stewart Bt
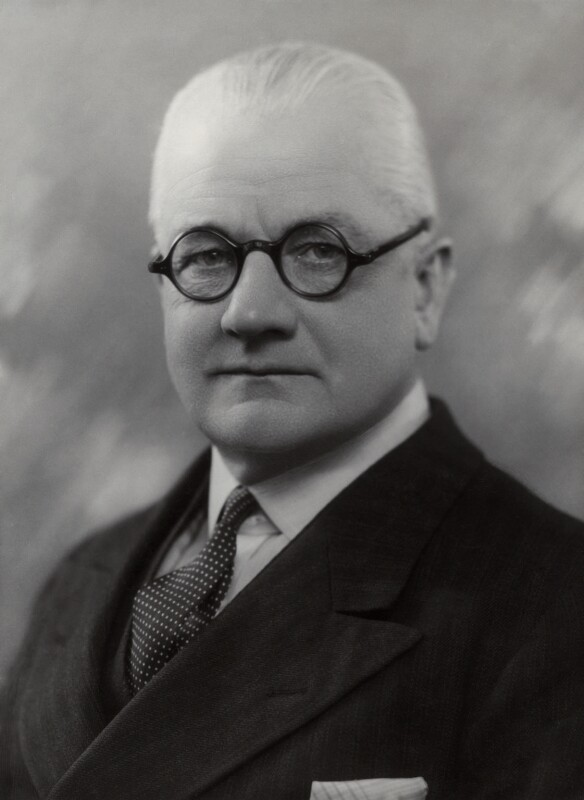
- Stewart in 1932
- Born: 9 May 1872; St Leonards, Sussex, England
- Died: 27 February 1951 (aged 78)
- Occupation: Industrialist
- Father: Halley Stewart
- Relatives: Bernard Stewart (brother); Harold Stewart (nephew)

Sir Percy Malcolm Stewart, 1st Baronet (9 May 1872 – 27 February 1951), was an English industrialist and philanthropist. He incorporated the London Brick Company in the 1920s, which was at the time reputed to be the largest brick-making company in the United Kingdom.

== Early life ==
He was born at St Leonards, Sussex, the sixth of eight children of Halley Stewart and his wife Jane Elizabeth Atkinson. He attended the University School, Hastings, the King's School, Rochester, and the Royal High School, Edinburgh, and was also educated in Germany.

After a first job in lightering on the River Thames from about 1891, Stewart entered his father's business, and became a junior partner in 1895. The family lived in Luton until the early 1900s at the Bramingham Shott estate. Their home went on to become Luton Museum, and the estate Wardown Park.

== Business ==
The cement business in which the family had an interest – B. J. Forder & Son Ltd – became part of the British Portland Cement Manufacturers Ltd in 1912, and Stewart became a managing director. He had remained managing director of the brick division of B. J. Forder & Son until it was amalgamated into the London Brick Company in 1923, and he became chairman of its board. He became chairman of the board of the Associated Portland Cement Manufacturers Ltd (APCM) in 1924 and remained in that position until 1945 when he became company president. He was thus chairman of two of the largest monopolistic companies in British industry.

== Influence ==
Sir Percy Malcolm Stewart and his father, Sir Halley Stewart, believed in good working and living conditions for employees. They developed the model village of Stewartby in Bedfordshire from 1926 onwards. As a special commissioner appointed by Ramsay MacDonald's coalition government of 1934, he helped devise schemes to reduce unemployment. In 1934, Sir Malcolm bought The Lodge at Sandy, Bedfordshire which is currently the headquarters of the RSPB. Stewart was created a Baronet, of Stewartby in the County of Bedford, in 1937. He was a governor of The Peckham Experiment (a social experiment in public health) in 1949.

== Death ==
He died in February 1951, aged 78, and was succeeded in the baronetcy by his son Ronald.

Baronetage of the United Kingdom
New creation	Baronet (of Stewartby); 1937–1951	Succeeded by Ronald Compton Stewart
