= Norman Godman =

Scottish politician

Member of Parliament for Greenock and Inverclyde Greenock and Port Glasgow (1983–1997)
- In office 9 June 1983 – 14 May 2001
- Preceded by: Dickson Mabon
- Succeeded by: David Cairns

Personal details
- Born: Norman Anthony Godman; 19 April 1938
- Died: 20 June 2018 (aged 80)
- Party: Labour
- Spouse(s): Trish Godman (wife; born Patricia Leonard)
- Relations: Michael, Mark and Gary Mulgrew (stepsons)

Norman Anthony Godman (19 April 1938 – 20 June 2018) was a Scottish Labour Party politician.

== Early life ==
Godman was one of nine children born to a trawler skipper man and a mother who worked in fish processing. After leaving Westbourne Street Boys' School at fifteen, he worked as a shipwright before undertaking night classes and eventually graduating from Hull and Heriot-Watt Universities with a PhD and undertaking an academic career in Scotland.

He served in the Royal Military Police during his National Service.

== Parliamentary career ==
Godman first stood for election to the House of Commons at the 1979 general election when he contested Aberdeen South, but lost to the sitting Conservative MP Iain Sproat by 772 votes.

He served as Member of Parliament for Greenock and Port Glasgow from 1983–97, and for Greenock and Inverclyde from 1997-2001. From 1988-89, he served as Opposition spokesman for Agricultural and Rural Affairs.

Renowned for his humility and integrity, he was a champion of the shipbuilding industry, particularly the Scott Lithgow yard on the lower Clyde. He was tenacious in his support for fishing communities and he took a lifelong interest in Irish affairs. On Northern Ireland, he championed an inquiry into Bloody Sunday and privately lobbied Tony Blair for Lord Cullen to chair an inquiry.

Godman served on the House of Commons Scottish Affairs Committee (1983–87), the European Legislation Committee (1989–95), the Northern Ireland Committee for a year and the Foreign Affairs Committee (1997-2001).

Bernard Ponsonby, the long-serving political editor of Scottish Television, described Godman as a "warm, gentle and empathetic man" whose career was characterised by "a special kind of integrity". ”An old-fashioned socialist whose values were marked by a belief in social justice and world peace, he argued for his values with a consistency which always made him a prisoner of his own conscience. He never sought moral high grounds or to ever promote himself above his values. "He was humble, hard-working, sought to do right by those who needed his advocacy. "He was a model public servant who gave Parliament his hard work, his party his loyalty – when he thought it merited – and he always gave the country his best judgement".

"His beliefs were incorruptible and he was incapable of bending or fashioning a view in order to get on. He had no time for spin, even less for apparatchiks who debased Labour values by wheeling and dealing". Ponsonby cited Godman's stand on abortion rights as an example of how he was willing to put his principles over his self-advancement, noting that he at one stage faced serious pressure from Catholic opponents who threatened his pre-selection over the issue. "He displayed a moral courage in seeing down those in his local party who saw his support for a woman’s right to choose as a ground for cutting short his Parliamentary career. He would gladly have it cut short than to do or say something that cast him as a hypocrite".

== Family ==
His wife was Trish Godman, who was the Member of the Scottish Parliament (MSP) for West Renfrewshire constituency from the 1999 Scottish Parliament election until her retirement in 2011.

Parliament of the United Kingdom
Preceded by Dickson Mabon	Member of Parliament for Greenock and Port Glasgow; 1983–1997	constituency abolished
New constituency	Member of Parliament for Greenock and Inverclyde; 1997–2001	Succeeded by David Cairns
