= Hector McNeil =

Scottish Labour politician

Hector McNeil MP

Secretary of State for Scotland
- In office 28 February 1950 – 26 October 1951
- Prime Minister: Clement Attlee
- Preceded by: Arthur Woodburn
- Succeeded by: James Stuart

Member of Parliament for Greenock
- In office 10 July 1941 – 11 October 1955
- Preceded by: Robert Gibson
- Succeeded by: Dickson Mabon

Personal details
- Born: 10 March 1907 Garelochhead, Scotland
- Died: 11 October 1955 (aged 48) New York City, U.S.
- Party: Labour
- Education: University of Glasgow

Hector McNeil (10 March 1907 – 11 October 1955) was a Scottish Labour politician who was Secretary of State for Scotland from 1950 to 1951.

== Life ==
McNeil was born in Garelochhead and educated at Woodside School and the University of Glasgow, trained as an engineer and worked as a journalist on a Scottish national newspaper. He was a member of Glasgow Town Council from 1932 to 1938. He chaired Glasgow Trades Council and stood for Parliament unsuccessfully in Galloway in 1929 and 1931, in Glasgow Kelvingrove in 1935 and in Ross and Cromarty in 1936. In 1939, he married Sheila Craig, and they had one son.

A member of the party's right wing, he was elected Member of Parliament for Greenock unopposed in a wartime by-election in 1941.

Following the 1945 election, McNeil became Parliamentary Under-Secretary of State for Foreign Affairs. He was promoted to Minister of State at the Foreign Office in October 1946, de facto deputy to the Foreign Secretary, Ernest Bevin, and appointed a member of the Privy Council. Through his position at the Foreign Office, he was vice-president of the United Nations General Assembly in 1947 and leader of the British delegation to the Economic Commission for Europe, 1948. It was later revealed that his personal assistant and private secretary at the time, Guy Burgess, was a Soviet agent, although McNeil never came under suspicion.

He served as Secretary of State for Scotland from February 1950 until October 1951 in the government of Clement Attlee. In the last years of his life, he served as managing director of Encyclopædia Britannica, Inc. In 1955, when travelling to New York City for business on the RMS Queen Mary, he suffered a cerebral haemorrhage; upon arriving in New York on 3 October, he was taken to Columbia Presbyterian Medical Center, where he died on 11 October, aged 48.

== Hector McNeil Memorial Baths ==
The Hector McNeil Memorial Baths was a swimming pool in the town of Greenock named in honour of McNeil. The foundation stone was laid by McNeil's wife on 9 October 1963. The baths were demolished in 2002 after the Greenock Waterfront Leisure Centre opened.

== Hector McNeil House ==
In May 2014, Inverclyde Council approved the name Hector McNeil House for the former library building in Clyde Square, Greenock when it re-opened as the main offices for Community Health and Care Partnership services in August 2014. Hector McNeil House, along with surrounding areas, will be demolished in 2025 after several years of planning on the regeneration of the area. Plans reveal that the mural on the façade of the Hector McNeil House, designed by Charles Anderson in 1970 will be restored and be incorporated into the design of the new eastern façade of the nearby Oak Mall, during its reconstruction.

== Sources ==
- Torrance, David, The Scottish Secretaries (Birlinn), 2006.

Parliament of the United Kingdom
Preceded by Robert Gibson	Member of Parliament for Greenock; 1941–1955	Succeeded by Dickson Mabon
Political offices
Preceded by Arthur Woodburn	Secretary of State for Scotland; 1950–1951	Succeeded by James Stuart
