= James Stewart (Liberal politician) =

Scottish politician

James Stewart (18 June 1827 – 28 May 1895) was a Scottish businessman Scottish Liberal Party politician, elected as a member of parliament for Greenock in 1878, resigning in 1884 to become Steward of the Manor of Northstead.

Stewart was a shipowner and foreign merchant, and owned estates in Scotland.

Parliament of the United Kingdom
Preceded by James Johnston Grieve	Member of Parliament for Greenock; 1878–1884	Succeeded by Thomas Sutherland
