= Robert Wallace (MP for Greenock) =

Scottish politician

Robert Wallace (1773–1855) was a Scottish politician. He was an electoral franchise reformer and agitator for postal service reform.

He was elected to the Westminster Parliament as the member for Greenock in the 1832 general election, sitting for that constituency until 1845.

Robert Wallace was the founder of the campaign for the Uniform Penny Post, providing cheap postage regardless of distance within the United Kingdom. He appeared in 1835 before the commission of enquiry set up to consider postal service reform.

== Life ==
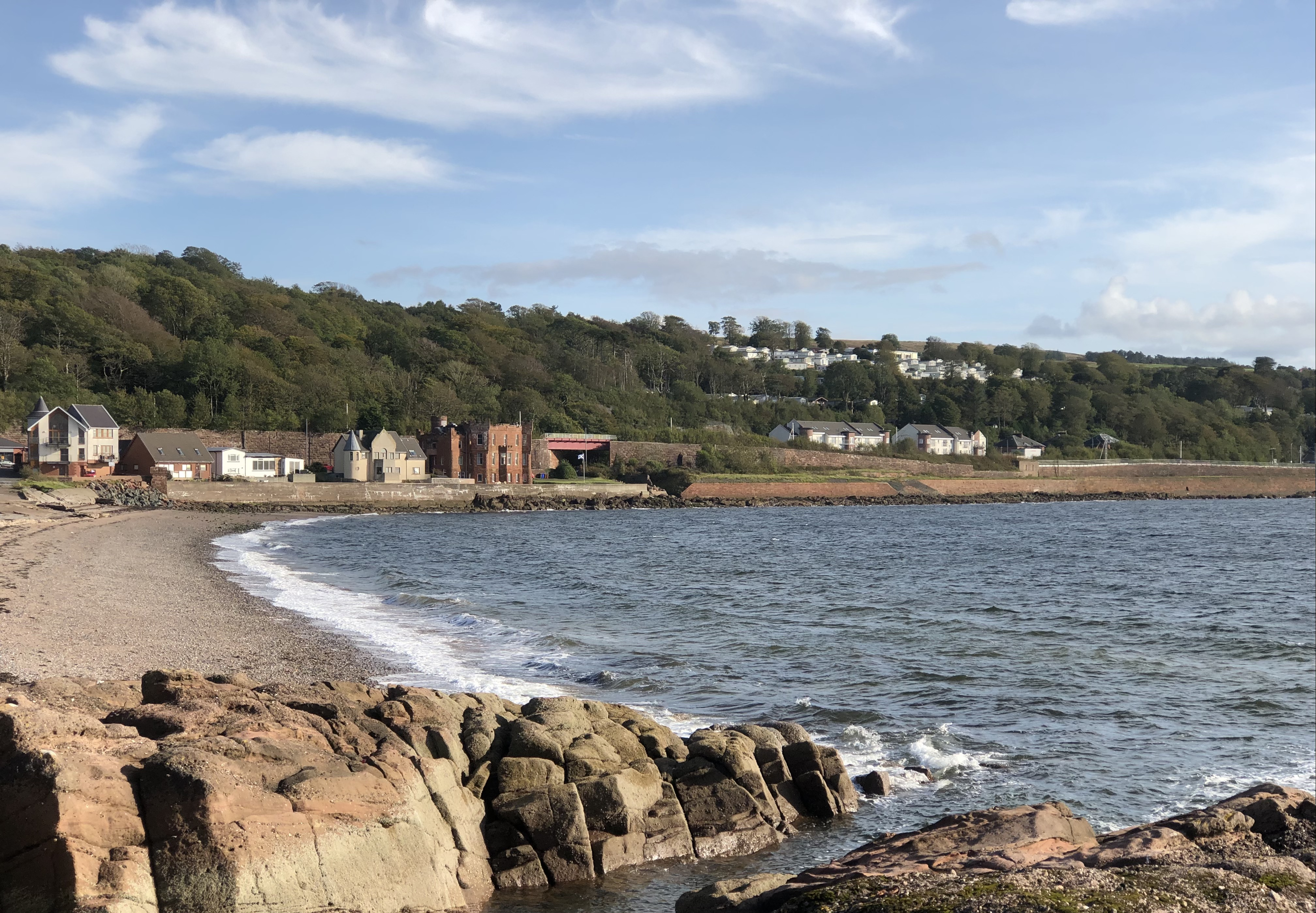
Wemyss Bay beach from rocks, railway in front of Kelly estate. Kelly House was located where modern "lodges" look out above houses on Shore Road.

He was the second son of John Wallace (1712–1805) of Cessnock, Glasgow and Kelly at Wemyss Bay in Renfrewshire, by his third wife, Janet, third daughter of Robert Colquhoun of the island of St. Christopher. His father was a West India merchant in Glasgow, who amassed a large fortune and became proprietor of some major estates. The eldest son was Sir James Maxwell Wallace. By the father's will Robert Wallace received the estate of Kelly and part of the West Indian property, and was known by the designation of Wallace of Kelly.

Robert Wallace was a strong Whig, and often spoke in public during the reform agitation before 1832. After the passing of the Reform Act 1832 he was the first member of parliament for Greenock under the act, and held that seat until 1846. In parliament his efforts were directed towards law reform, especially in the direction of having cheaper and simpler methods for the transfer of heritable property.

His name is closely associated with the reform of the postal service, and with the introduction of the penny post. After repeated applications to parliament he succeeded in having a Royal Commission appointed in 1836 to report on the state of the posting department. Reports made by the commission supported the charges brought against this department, and prepared the way for reforms. Wallace was chairman of the committee that examined Rowland Hill's penny postage scheme; and it was by his casting vote that it was decided to recommend this scheme to parliament.

In 1846 he became embarrassed financially through the depreciation in value of some of his West Indian estates, and resigned his seat in parliament. The estate of Kelly was sold, and Wallace lived in retirement at Seafield Cottage, Greenock. After his resignation a public subscription was made for him, which enabled him to live his last years in comfort. He died at Seafield on 1 April 1855.

== Family ==
He married Margaret, daughter of Sir William Forbes of Craigievar 5th baronet, but left no issue. His sister, Anne Wallace, died unmarried in 1873 in her hundred and second year.

== Notes ==
Attribution

This article incorporates text from a publication now in the public domain: "Wallace, Robert (1773-1855)". Dictionary of National Biography. London: Smith, Elder & Co. 1885–1900.

Parliament of the United Kingdom
New constituency	Member of Parliament for Greenock; 1832–1845	Succeeded by Walter Baine
