= 1941 Greenock by-election =

UK parliamentary by-election

The 1941 Greenock by-election was a parliamentary by-election held on 10 July 1941 for the British House of Commons constituency of Greenock in Renfrewshire, Scotland. Hector McNeil was elected unopposed to succeed Robert Gibson.

== Background ==
Greenock is a town in the west central Lowlands of Scotland. The seat became vacant when the Labour Member of Parliament (MP) Robert Gibson resigned to take up the post of Chairman of the Scottish Land Court. Gibson had held the seat since a by-election in 1936.

== Result ==
The Labour Party's candidate was Hector McNeil, a journalist and trade unionist and former councillor from Glasgow who had contested four previous parliamentary elections. He was elected unopposed as no other candidates were nominated in Greenock: the parties in the war-time Coalition Government had agreed not to contest vacancies in seats held by other coalition parties (although some by-elections were contested by independent candidates or those from minor parties).

McNeill held the seat through four general elections, until his death shortly after the 1955 general election, which precipitated another by-election.

== See also ==
- List of United Kingdom by-elections (1931–50)
