= William Elliot-Murray-Kynynmound, 3rd Earl of Minto =

British Whig politician

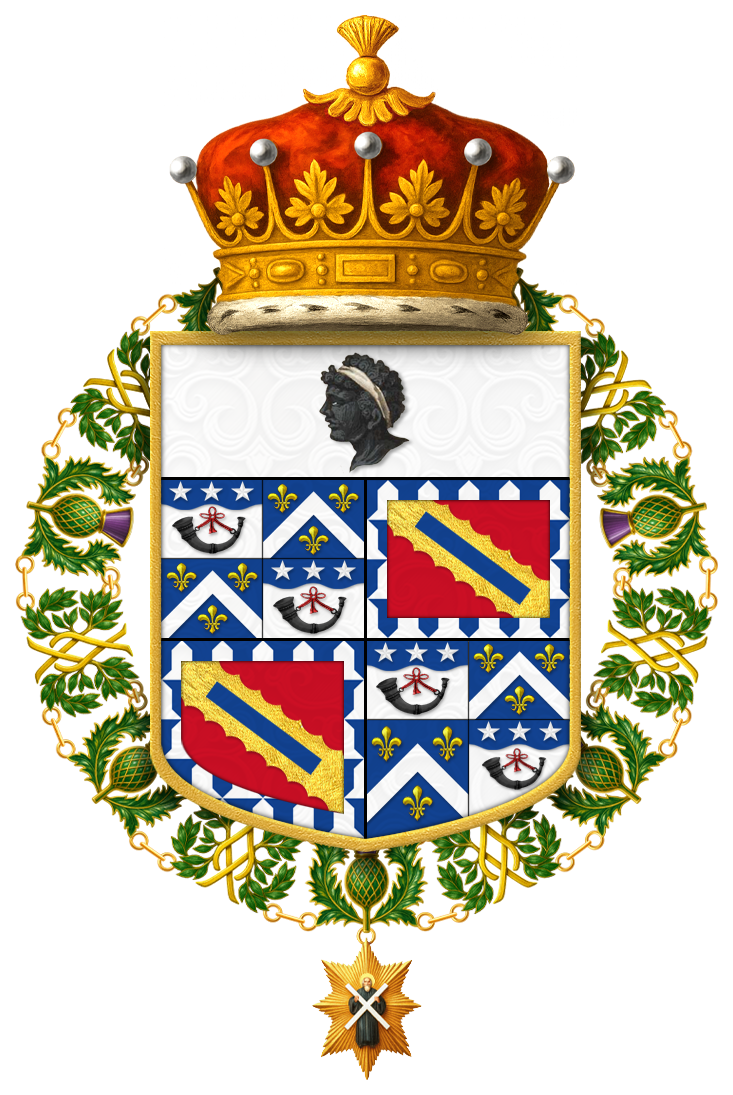
Shield of Arms of William Hugh Elliot-Murray-Kynynmound, 3rd Earl of Minto, KT

William Hugh Elliot-Murray-Kynynmound, 3rd Earl of Minto, KT, (/kɪˈnɪnmənd/; 19 March 1814 – 17 March 1891) was a British Whig politician.

== Early life ==
He was the eldest son of Gilbert Elliot-Murray-Kynynmound, 2nd Earl of Minto. From his birth in 1814 until his accession in 1859, he was styled Viscount Melgund.

He was educated at Eton and Trinity College, Cambridge.

== Career ==
He was elected as the member of parliament (MP) for Hythe at a by-election in May 1837, and held the seat until the 1841 general election, when he stood unsuccessfully in Rochester.

At the 1847 general election, he was returned as MP for Greenock. He held that seat until the 1852 general election, when he contested Glasgow without success. He was returned for Clackmannanshire and Kinross-shire at the 1857 general election, but did not stand again in 1859.

He was made a Knight of the Thistle in 1870.

== Personal life ==
He married Emma, daughter of General Sir Thomas Hislop, 1st Baronet and their children included William and Gilbert Elliot-Murray-Kynynmound, 4th Earl of Minto.

He died in 1891, aged 76, two days short of his 77th birthday.

== Arms ==
Coat of arms of William Elliot-Murray-Kynynmound, 3rd Earl of Minto
Crest A dexter arm embowed issuant from clouds, throwing a dart, all proper.. Escutcheon Quarterly : 1st and 4th grand quarters, quarterly; 1st and 4th, argent, a hunting-horn sable, stringed gules, in the dexter chief point a crescent of the last; on a chief wavy azure, three mullets of the field (Murray of Melgund); 2nd and 3rd, azure, a chevron argent, between three fleurs-de-lis or (Kynynmound of that ilk); 2nd and 3rd grand quarters, gules, on a bend engrailed or, a baton azure, within a bordure vair (Elliot, of Minto); over all, a chief of augmentation argent, charged with a Moor's head couped in profile proper., being the arms of Corsica. Supporters Dexter, an Indian sheep, sinister, a fawn, all proper. Motto Non eget arcu (He needs not the bow); Below: Suaviter et fortiter (Mildy and firmly). Orders The Most Honourable Order of the Bath - Knight Grand Cross (GCB)

Parliament of the United Kingdom
Preceded by Stewart Marjoribanks	Member of Parliament for Hythe; May 1837–1841	Succeeded by Stewart Marjoribanks
Preceded by Walter Baine	Member of Parliament for Greenock; 1847–1852	Succeeded by Alexander Murray Dunlop
Preceded by James Johnstone	Member of Parliament for Clackmannanshire and Kinross-shire; 1857–1859	Succeeded by Sir William Patrick Adam
Peerage of the United Kingdom
Preceded by Gilbert Elliot-Murray-Kynynmound	Earl of Minto; 1859–1891	Succeeded by Gilbert John Elliot-Murray-Kynynmound
