= James Grieve (Liberal politician) =

James Johnston Grieve (14 July 1810 - 20 August 1891) was a Scottish Liberal politician who sat in the House of Commons from 1868 to 1878.

Grieve was the son of Robert Grieve of Kielator, Killin, Perthshire and his wife Margaret Johnston, daughter of James Johnston of Alton, Motfatt. He was educated at the Burgh School, Moffat and at Curlavaroch Academy, Dumfriesshire. He was a senior partner in the mercantile firm of Baine & Johnston, of Greenock. He was a J.P. for Renfrewshire and was four times Provost of Greenock.

At the 1868 general election Grieve was elected Member of Parliament for Greenock. He held the seat until 1878.

Grieve died at the age of 81.

Grieve married firstly in 1833, Mary Jane Richardson, daughter of Andrew Richardson of Halifax, Nova Scotia, and secondly Annie Hill, daughter of Col. Charles J. Hill, of the Halifax Militia, Nova Scotia.

Parliament of the United Kingdom
Preceded by Alexander Murray Dunlop	Member of Parliament for Greenock; 1868–1878	Succeeded by James Stewart
