= Greenock and Port Glasgow =

UK Parliament constituency (1974–1997)

- Former burgh constituency for the House of Commons
- Major settlements: Greenock, Port Glasgow

1974–1997
- Seats: One
- Created from: Greenock; West Renfrewshire
- Replaced by: Greenock & Inverclyde; West Renfrewshire

Greenock and Port Glasgow was a burgh constituency of the House of Commons of the Parliament of the United Kingdom from 1974 until 1997, electing one Member of Parliament (MP) by the first past the post system of election.

== Boundaries ==
1974–1983: The burghs of Greenock and Port Glasgow.

1983–1997: The Inverclyde District electoral divisions of Cartsdyke, Clune Brae, Greenock South West, Greenock West Central, Greenock West End, Port Glasgow East, Port Glasgow South, and Port Glasgow West.

As first used, in the February 1974 general election, the constituency had been defined by the Second Periodical Review of the Boundary Commission to cover the burghs of Greenock and Port Glasgow in the county of Renfrew. The rest of the county was covered by the county constituencies of East Renfrewshire and West Renfrewshire, and the burgh constituency of Paisley.

Prior to the February 1974 election, the county had been covered by East Renfrewshire, West Renfrewshire, Greenock, and Paisley, with the Greenock constituency covering the burgh of Greenock, and the burgh of Port Glasgow within the West Renfrewshire constituency.

February 1974 boundaries were used also in the general elections of October 1974 and 1979.

In 1975, under the Local Government (Scotland) Act 1973, counties and burghs throughout Scotland had been abolished in favour of regions and districts and islands council areas. Therefore, in 1975, the constituency of Greenock and Port Glasgow had become effectively a constituency within the Inverclyde district of the Strathclyde region. For the 1983 general election new constituency boundaries were drawn, taking account of new local government boundaries.

1983 boundaries were used also in the general elections of 1987 and 1992.

In 1996, under the Local Government etc (Scotland) Act 1994, the Inverclyde district became a unitary council area

For the 1997 general election, the Greenock and Port Glasgow constituency was divided between the Greenock and Inverclyde and Renfrewshire West constituencies.

== Members of Parliament ==
Election	Member	Party
February 1974	Dickson Mabon	Labour Co-operative
1981	Dickson Mabon	Social Democrat
1983	Dr Norman Godman	Labour
1997	constituency abolished	

== Election results ==
=== Elections of the 1970s ===
General election February 1974: Greenock and Port Glasgow
Party	Candidate	Votes	%	±%
Labour Co-op	Dickson Mabon	20,565	48.3	
Liberal	Menzies Campbell	8,789	20.6	
Conservative	John Scott Younger	7,892	18.5	
SNP	John Kenneth Wright	4,881	11.5	
Communist	Alexander Cameron Murray	483	1.1	
Majority		11,776	27.7	
Turnout		42,610	71.1	
Labour Co-op win (new seat)				

General election October 1974: Greenock and Port Glasgow
Party	Candidate	Votes	%	±%
Labour Co-op	Dickson Mabon	21,279	48.2	−0.1
SNP	John Kenneth Wright	9,324	21.1	+9.6
Liberal	Menzies Campbell	8,580	19.4	−1.2
Conservative	Alexander Kinnear Foote	4,969	11.3	−7.2
Majority		11,955	27.1	−0.6
Turnout		44,152	73.9	+2.8
Labour Co-op hold		Swing		

General election 1979: Greenock and Port Glasgow
Party	Candidate	Votes	%	±%
Labour Co-op	Dickson Mabon	24,071	53.0	+4.8
Liberal	James Boyd	12,789	28.2	+8.8
Conservative	Ronald Glasgow	4,926	10.9	−0.4
SNP	John Kenneth Wright	3,435	7.6	−13.5
Workers Revolutionary	Isabella Mathieson	176	0.4	New
Majority		11,282	24.8	−2.3
Turnout		45,397	73.4	−0.5
Labour Co-op hold		Swing		

=== Elections of the 1980s ===
General election 1983: Greenock and Port Glasgow
Party	Candidate	Votes	%	±%
Labour	Norman Godman	20,650	46.8	−7.6
Liberal	Alan Blair	16,025	36.3	+9.2
Conservative	Charles Crichton	4,314	9.8	−0.5
SNP	Alan Clayton	2,989	6.8	−1.0
Workers Revolutionary	George McKinlay	114	0.3	−0.1
Majority		4,625	10.5	−14.3
Turnout		44,092	74.2	+0.8
Labour hold		Swing		

General election 1987: Greenock and Port Glasgow
Party	Candidate	Votes	%	±%
Labour	Norman Godman	27,848	63.9	+17.1
Liberal	John Moody	7,793	17.9	−18.4
Conservative	Thomas Pearson	4,119	9.6	−0.2
SNP	Thomas Lenehan	3,721	8.6	+1.8
Majority		20,055	46.0	+35.5
Turnout		43,481	75.4	+1.2
Labour hold		Swing	+17.7	

=== Elections of the 1990s ===
General election 1992: Greenock and Port Glasgow
Party	Candidate	Votes	%	±%
Labour	Norman Godman	22,258	58.0	−5.9
SNP	Ian Black	7,279	19.0	+10.4
Conservative	John McCullough	4,779	11.7	+2.1
Liberal Democrats	Christopher Lambert	4,359	11.4	−6.5
Majority		14,979	39.0	−7.0
Turnout		38,675	73.7	−1.7
Labour hold		Swing		

== Notes and references ==
- Leigh Rayment's Historical List of MPs – Constituencies beginning with "G" (part 2)
