= Harold Charles Stewart =

British pharmacologist and medical author

Harold Charles Stewart CBE FRCP FRCS FRSE DL
- Born: 23 November 1906; England
- Died: 7 December 2001 (aged 95)
- Education: Cambridge University
- Occupations: Pharmacologist, author, educator
- Spouse(s): Dorothy Lowen (m. 1929; died 1969) Audrey Nicolle (m. 1970)
- Children: Ian Stewart
- Father: Bernard Stewart
- Relatives: Halley Stewart (grandfather); Percy Malcolm Stewart (uncle)
- Military career
- Service: Home Guard; Royal Army Service Corps
- Wars: World War II

Prof Harold Charles Stewart CBE FRCP FRCS FRSE FFA DL (23 November 1906 – 7 December 2001) was a 20th-century British pharmacologist and medical author. He was Deputy Lieutenant of Greater London from 1967 to 1982.

== Life ==
He was born in southern England on 23 November 1906, the son of Dr Bernard Halley Stewart (son of Sir Halley Stewart and his wife, Mabel Florence Wyatt. He was educated at Mill Hill School in London. He followed in his father's footsteps and obtained a general degree at Cambridge University, allowing him to continue and study Medicine there, where he graduated MB ChB in 1931. He received his first doctorate (MD) in 1935 and his second (PhD) in 1941.

In the Second World War he was in the Home Guard 1939/40 and from 1941 he served as a Major in the Royal Army Service Corps. He was demobbed in 1946. In 1950 he became Head of Pharmacology at St Mary's Hospital Medical School in London, remaining in this role until 1974. Meanwhile, he was also a Reader in Pharmacology at the University of London, becoming Professor in 1965. He was also a member of the Asthma Research Council and Medical Council on Alcoholism (which he jointly founded in 1969). He was also a Gresham Professor at Gresham College. He was official advisor on pharmacology to the Ministry of Defence and Director General of the St John's Ambulance Association.

In 1974 he was elected a Fellow of the Royal Society of Edinburgh. His proposers were Frederick Randall Smith, Sir Derrick Dunlop, Stanley Alstead and Sir David Cuthbertson.

He died on 7 December 2001 aged 95.

== Family ==
In 1929 he married Dorothy Irene Lowen. Following her death in 1969, the following year he Audrey Patricia Nicolle. He had one son by his first marriage: Ian Stewart, Baron Stewartby.

== Publications ==
- Drugs in Anaesthetic Practice (1962)
- Concise Antibiotic Treatment (1970)
