= Robert Gibson, Lord Gibson =

Scottish lawyer and politician

The Honourable Lord Gibson

Chairman of the Scottish Land Court
- In office 1941–1965
- Preceded by: Lord Murray
- Succeeded by: Lord Birsay

Member of Parliament for Greenock
- In office 1936–1941
- Preceded by: Godfrey Collins
- Succeeded by: Hector McNeil
- Majority: 53.4%

Personal details
- Born: Robert Gibson; 20 April 1886
- Died: 9 April 1965 (aged 78)
- Party: Labour
- Spouse: Elizabeth Campbell
- Education: University of Glasgow
- Occupation: Politician, judge
- Profession: Advocate

Military service
- Branch/service: Army
- Years of service: 1915–1918
- Rank: Captain
- Unit: Royal Garrison Artillery

Robert Gibson, Lord Gibson FRSE (20 April 1886 – 9 April 1965) was a Scottish lawyer and politician. He was Member of Parliament (MP) for Greenock from 1936 to 1941, and Chairman of the Scottish Land Court from 1941 to 1965.

== Early life ==
He was born in Hamilton the son of Robert Gibson.

Gibson was educated at both the Hamilton Academy prep and senior schools and continued his studies at the University of Glasgow, where he was Cunninghame Gold Medallist in Mathematics, Donaldson Scholar in Chemistry, Major Young Bursar in Arts and Law, Metcalfe Bursar in Science, and Stewart Bursar and Prizeman in Law. He received degrees of M.A., B.Sc. and LL.B., all at the University of Glasgow. He was elected Secretary of the Glasgow University Students' Representative Council in 1909, and President in 1910.

In 1911, he was appointed Lecturer in Applied Electricity at Hamilton Technical School, located at Hamilton Academy, and taught in the Academy's senior school, one of his pupils being Thomas Cassells, who was also to serve as a Labour MP (for Dunbartonshire, and for the same period, 1936–41).

In 1913 he married Elizabeth Campbell Atkinson.

In 1915, shortly after the outbreak of the First World War, Gibson joined the Royal Garrison Artillery as a lieutenant. He rose to the rank of Captain but did not see active service, being returned to the Technical Training Staff of Scottish Command.

== Legal career ==
After the War, in 1918, Gibson was admitted to the Faculty of Advocates, and between 1929 and 1931, was Senior Advocate Depute, one of the country's senior prosecutors. He was a member of the Labour Party and stood in a number of elections, serving as Member of Parliament for Greenock from 1936 to 1941. He stood down from his seat in 1941, when he was appointed as Chairman of the Scottish Land Court, succeeding another former pupil of Hamilton Academy, David King Murray (Lord Murray.)

== Political career ==
Gibson was an unsuccessful candidate in Roxburgh and Selkirk in 1929, Edinburgh North in 1931, at the Combined Scottish Universities in a 1934 by-election, and Dundee in the 1935 general election.

He was elected as Member of Parliament (MP) for Greenock at a by-election in 1936, and held his seat until he resigned from the House of Commons in 1941 on his appointment as Chairman of the Scottish Land Court.

== Later life ==
He was elected a Fellow of the Royal Society of Edinburgh in 1944. His proposers were Robert Taylor Skinner, Thomas MacKay Cooper (Lord Cooper of Culross), Alexander Moncrieff, Lord Moncrieff and Catherwood Learmonth.

He died in Leith Hospital in Edinburgh on 9 April 1965.

== Sources ==
- Craig, F. W. S. (1983) [1969]. British parliamentary election results 1918–1949 (3rd ed.). Chichester: Parliamentary Research Services. ISBN 0-900178-06-X.
- Hansard, parliamentary debate, 16 Dec. 1936 Thomas Cassels and Robert Gibson, reference to Hamilton Academy. Retrieved 2011-01-11
- Hansard, parliamentary debate 21 Nov. 1939 Robert Gibson, reference to his attendance at Hamilton Academy's prep school in the 1890s. Retrieved 2011-01-11

Parliament of the United Kingdom
Preceded by Godfrey Collins	Member of Parliament for Greenock; 1936–1941	Succeeded by Hector McNeil
Legal offices
Preceded by Lord Murray	Chairman of the Scottish Land Court; 1941–1965	Succeeded by Lord Birsay
