= Dickson Mabon =

Scottish politician (1925–2008)

The Right Honourable Dickson Mabon FRSA

Minister of State for Energy
- In office 5 April 1976 – 4 May 1979
- Prime Minister: James Callaghan
- Preceded by: Lord Balogh
- Succeeded by: Hamish Gray

Minister of State for Scotland
- In office 7 January 1967 – 19 June 1970 Serving with Lord Hughes
- Prime Minister: Harold Wilson
- Preceded by: George Willis
- Succeeded by: Baroness Tweedsmuir

Member of Parliament for Greenock and Port Glasgow Greenock (1955–74)
- In office 8 December 1955 – 13 May 1983
- Preceded by: Hector McNeil
- Succeeded by: Norman Godman

Personal details
- Born: 1 November 1925 Glasgow, Scotland
- Died: 10 April 2008 (aged 82) Eastbourne, England
- Party: Labour (1948–81; 1991–2008); SDP (1981–88); Liberal Democrats (1988–91)
- Spouse: Elizabeth Zinn (m. 1970)
- Education: University of Glasgow
- Profession: Physician

Jesse Dickson Mabon PC FRSA (1 November 1925 – 10 April 2008), sometimes known as Dick Mabon, was a Scottish politician, physician and business executive. He was the founder of The Manifesto Group of Labour MPs, an alliance of moderate MPs who fought the perceived leftward drift of the Labour Party in the 1970s. He was a Labour Co-operative MP until October 1981, when he defected to the SDP. He lost his seat in 1983, and rejoined the Labour Party in 1991.

== Early life ==
Mabon was born on 1 November 1925 in Glasgow, the son of Jesse Dickson Mabon, a butcher; and his wife, Isabel Simpson (née Montgomery). He was educated at Possilpark Primary School, Cumbrae Primary School and North Kelvinside Secondary School in Maryhill (now Cleveden Secondary School).

He worked as a Bevin Boy in the coal mining industry in Lanarkshire during the Second World War, before doing his National Service (1944–48).

He studied medicine at the University of Glasgow after he was demobilised. Mabon was Chairman of the Glasgow University Labour Club (1948–50), then served as Chairman of the National Association of Labour Students in 1949–50, and finally as President of Glasgow University Union in 1951–52, and of the Scottish Union of Students, 1954–55.

In 1955, he won The Observer Mace, speaking with A. A. Kennedy and representing the University of Glasgow. In 1995, the competition was renamed the John Smith Memorial Mace and is now run by the English-Speaking Union.

He was political columnist for the Scottish Daily Record from 1955 to 1964, and studied under Henry Kissinger at Harvard University in 1963. He was also a visiting physician at Manor House Hospital, London, 1958–64.

== Parliamentary career ==
Mabon was the unsuccessful Labour candidate for Bute and North Ayrshire in 1951, and Labour Co-operative candidate for Renfrewshire West in 1955. He was elected as a Labour Co-operative Member of Parliament for Greenock at a by-election in December 1955, replacing Tony Benn as Labour's youngest MP. He held that seat (from 1974 Greenock and Port Glasgow) until 1983. He became a frontbench Spokesman on Health in 1962.

He was a junior minister as joint Parliamentary Under-Secretary of State for Scotland (1964–67) and was promoted to Minister of State for Scotland, 1967–70. After Labour lost the 1970 general election, he became Deputy Opposition Spokesman on Scotland, but resigned in April 1972 over Labour's position on the Common Market. Although he supported Roy Jenkins at the Labour Party leadership election in 1976, James Callaghan appointed him as Minister of State in the Department of Energy (1976–79), where he took charge of North Sea oil. He was appointed a Privy Counsellor in 1977.

Mabon was also a Member of the Council of Europe and of the Assembly of the Western European Union, 1970–72 and 1974–76, and of the North Atlantic Assembly, 1980–82. He was Chairman of the European Movement, 1975–76 (and deputy chairman, 1979–83), and Founder Chairman of the Manifesto Group in the Parliamentary Labour Party (1974–76), set up to counter the left-wing Tribune group.

Following Labour's defeat in the 1979 general election Mabon was tipped by The Glasgow Herald as the front-runner to succeed Bruce Millan as Shadow Secretary of State for Scotland, if the latter chose to move to another portfolio. However, the vacancy did not arise as Millan ultimately remained in the post until 1983.

Mabon defected to the Social Democratic Party (SDP) in October 1981. The party was founded by the so-called "Gang of Four" in March 1981, which consisted of right-wing Labour MPs discontented with the direction of the Labour Party at the time; but Mabon later called himself a founder member of the party. He unsuccessfully contested Renfrew West and Inverclyde for the SDP in 1983 after the local Liberals refused to stand their candidate down for him in his previous seat, and fought Renfrew West again for the SDP/Alliance in 1987, and also the Lothians seat in the 1984 election for the European Parliament. Mabon was one of the SDP's negotiators in their merger attempts with the Liberals, and joined the post-merger Social and Liberal Democrats (SLD; later the Liberal Democrats) upon its foundation. However, in October 1988 he failed to be elected to the SLD's national executive committee, and by 1991 he had rejoined Labour and subsequently became an enthusiastic supporter of Tony Blair's "New Labour" agenda.

== Later life ==
He was chairman of SOS Children's Villages UK until 1993 and tried to get an SOS Children's Village built in Scotland, first near Glasgow and then at Stirling.

He rejoined the Labour Party in 1991, and subsequently became a member of the executive committee of Eastbourne Constituency Labour Party until 2004.

Mabon, whose first directorship had been at Radio Clyde in the 1970s, added a non-executive directorship with East Midlands Electricity to his place at Cairn; in 1992 he urged John Major's government to privatise British Coal in two halves with one going to an East Midland-led consortium including himself. He kept up his interest in medicine, in 1990 becoming president of the Faculty of the History of Medicine. Mabon was a Fellow of the Royal Society of Arts (FRSA) and a Freeman of the City of London. From 1995 – 1996, he also served as the 74th President of the Faculty of Homeopathy.

== Family ==
He married Elizabeth Sarah "Liz" Zinn, an actress, in 1970. They had one son. She died in 2024 at the age of 85.

== Death ==
Mabon died on 10 April 2008, aged 82, at his home in Eastbourne. He was survived by his wife and their son.

Parliament of the United Kingdom
Preceded by Hector McNeil	Member of Parliament for Greenock; 1955 – 1974	Constituency abolished
New constituency	Member of Parliament for Greenock and Port Glasgow; 1974–1983	Succeeded by Norman Godman
Political offices
Preceded by Lord Balogh	Minister for Energy; 1976–1979	Succeeded by Hamish Gray
Preceded by George Willis	Minister of State for Scotland; 1967–1970	Succeeded by Baroness Tweedsmuir
