= Helen Sutherland =

English art patron and collector (1881–1965)

Helen Christian Sutherland (24 February 1881 – 29 April 1965), married name Helen Denman, was an English art patron and collector.

== Life ==
She was the daughter of Sir Thomas Sutherland, and his only surviving child. She married Richard Denman in 1904; the marriage was annulled in 1913. They had separated in 1909; Denman married May Spencer in 1914.

After her marriage failed, Sutherland began to collect art. Initially she took guidance from Freddy Mayor of the Mayor Gallery. From the mid-1920s she collected mainly from a group of artist friends. In 1929 she took a lease on Rock Hall, Northumberland. She was an early patron of the Ashington Group.

David Jones met Sutherland through Jim Ede; Ben and Winifred Nicholson met her through the artist Constance Lane, in 1925. Through Michael Roberts and his wife Janet Adam Smith, the poet Kathleen Raine was introduced to Sutherland, who fostered her two children with Charles Madge during World War II.

Sutherland was one of Piet Mondrian's early English supporters, buying a picture by 1938. From 1939 she lived at Cockley Moor, near Dockray, Penrith, now in Cumbria, in a house redesigned by Leslie Martin in Modernist style. She left her art collection to Nicolete Gray.
