= Thomas Sutherland (banker) =

Scottish banker and politician (1834–1922)

Sir Thomas Sutherland GCMG
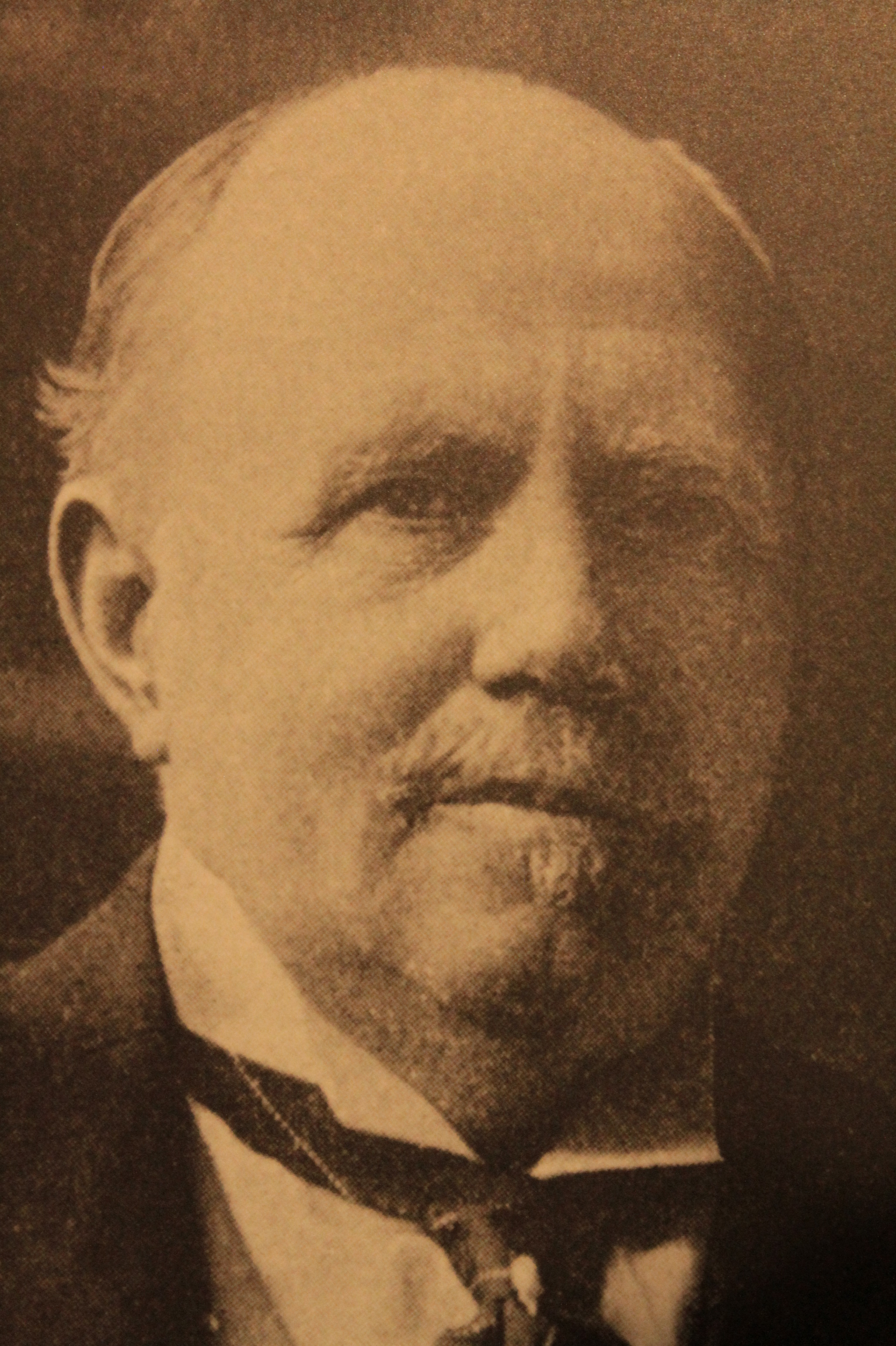
- Sutherland, c. 1890
- Born: 16 August 1834; Aberdeen, Scotland
- Died: 1 January 1922 (aged 87); London, England
- Education: University of Aberdeen
- Occupations: Banker; Politician
- Known for: Founder of HSBC
- Spouse: Alice Macnaught (m. 1880, died 1920)
- Children: 3 Helen Sutherland; Eric Macnaught Sutherland; Thomas Leslie Macnaught Sutherland
- Father: Robert Sutherland of Aberdeen

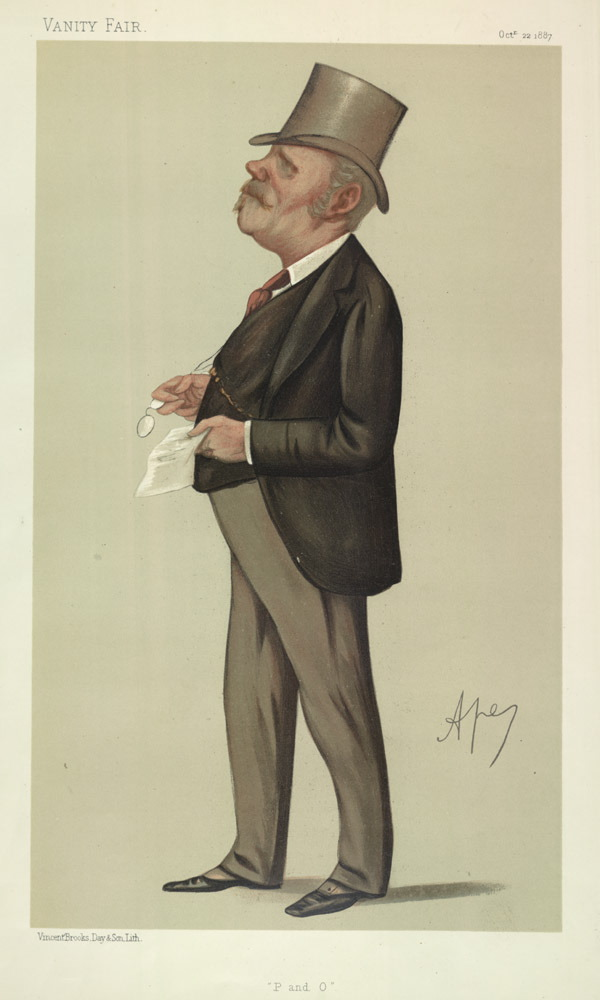
Caricature of Thomas Sutherland by Spy

Sir Thomas Sutherland, GCMG (Chinese: 蘇石蘭, 16 August 1834 – 1 January 1922) was a Scottish banker and politician, initially elected to represent the Liberal Party and then as a Liberal Unionist. He founded HSBC and was a director of P&O.

== Early life ==
Sutherland was the son of Robert Sutherland and Christian Webster of Aberdeen. He was educated at Marischal College, University of Aberdeen.

== Career ==
Sutherland got his start clerking in the London office of P&O. Soon after, P&O promoted Sutherland to superintendent, assigning him to British Hong Kong to manage the firm's Asian operation. In 1863, he became the first chairman of the Hong Kong and Whampoa Dock. In order to help finance the burgeoning trade between China and Europe, and explore the potential for China—United States trade, Sutherland established HSBC in 1865 and became its first vice-chairman.

He was appointed member of the Legislative Council of Hong Kong from 1865 to 1866. In 1872 he was appointed Managing Director of P&O.

In November 1884, Sutherland was elected at a by-election as the Member of Parliament (MP) for Greenock. A Liberal, he was re-elected in 1885, but when the Liberals split over Irish Home Rule he joined the breakaway Liberal Unionist Party. He was re-elected as a Liberal Unionist in 1886, but lost the seat at the 1892 general election. However, he was reinstated when his opponent was unseated on petition, and held the seat until he stood down at the 1900 general election.

== Personal life ==
In 1880, Sutherland married Alice MacNaught. She was the daughter of Rev. John Macnaught of Trinity Church, Conduit Street, London, England. The couple had two sons, and a daughter, Helen Christian Sutherland (1881–1965), known as an art patron; one of the sons, Eric Macnaught Sutherland, died in the Second Boer War, the other son, Thomas Leslie Macnaught Sutherland, died during World War I. In 1920, his wife Alice died.

== Death and legacy ==
In 1922, Sutherland died in London, England. Sutherland Street in Sheung Wan, Hong Kong was named after him.

Parliament of the United Kingdom
| Preceded by James Stewart | Member of Parliament for Greenock; 1884–1892 | Succeeded by John Bruce (unseated on petition) |
| Preceded by John Bruce | Member of Parliament for Greenock; 1892–1900 | Succeeded by James Reid |
Legislative Council of Hong Kong
| Preceded by Charles Wilson Murray | Unofficial Member; 1865–1866; Served alongside: Francis Chomley, James Whittall | Succeeded by Hugh Bold Gibb |
