= Ian Stewart, Baron Stewartby =

British Conservative Party politician and numismatist

The Right Honourable The Lord Stewartby PC Kt RD FSA FRSE FBA

Member of the House of Lords
- Lord Temporal
- Life peerage 20 July 1992 – 12 November 2015

Minister of State for Northern Ireland
- In office 25 July 1988 – 25 July 1989
- Prime Minister: Margaret Thatcher
- Preceded by: John Stanley
- Succeeded by: John Cope

Minister of State for the Armed Forces
- In office 13 June 1987 – 25 July 1988
- Prime Minister: Margaret Thatcher
- Preceded by: John Stanley
- Succeeded by: Archie Hamilton

Economic Secretary to the Treasury
- In office 19 October 1983 – 11 June 1987
- Prime Minister: Margaret Thatcher
- Preceded by: John Moore
- Succeeded by: Peter Lilley

Member of Parliament for North Hertfordshire Hitchin (1974–1983)
- In office 28 February 1974 – 16 March 1992
- Preceded by: Shirley Williams
- Succeeded by: Oliver Heald

Personal details
- Born: 10 August 1935
- Died: 3 March 2018 (aged 82)
- Party: Conservative

Bernard Harold Ian Halley Stewart, Baron Stewartby, PC, Kt, RD, FSA, FRSE, FBA (10 August 1935 – 3 March 2018) was a British Conservative Party politician and numismatist. He was the Member of Parliament for Hitchin from February 1974 to 1983, and for North Hertfordshire from 1983 to 1992. He sat in the House of Lords from 1992 to 2015.

== Early life ==
Stewart was the son of Harold Charles Stewart FRSE and Dorothy Irene Lowen, and was named after his grandfather, Bernard Halley Stewart.

He was educated at Haileybury College and Jesus College, Cambridge, where he gained a first-class degree in the Classical Tripos; he was made an honorary fellow of the college in 1994.

== Political career ==
Stewart contested Hammersmith North at the 1970 general election, being beaten by Frank Tomney of the Labour Party. He was Member of Parliament for Hitchin from February 1974 to 1983, and for North Hertfordshire from 1983 until he stood down in 1992. He served as junior minister for Defence Procurement, Economic Secretary to the Treasury, and Minister for the Armed Forces.

=== House of Lords ===
After he left the House of Commons, Stewart was created a life peer as Baron Stewartby, of Portmoak in the District of Perth and Kinross on 20 July 1992. He sat in the House of Lords until his retirement on 12 November 2015.

== Interest in numismatics ==
Stewartby's interest in Scottish coins had started when he was a schoolboy. Noting the lack of a complete book on the subject more recent than Edward Burns' 1887 work Coinage of Scotland, he was encouraged to write his own. The result, The Scottish Coinage, was published by Spink and Son in 1955. The preface, dated December 1953, gives the location as Haileybury College, Hertford, which he attended from 1949 to 1954, as a member of Allenby House.

In July 2007, Stewartby's collection of antique Scottish coins dating back to the 12th century and worth an estimated £500,000 was stolen from his home near Peebles. In November 2008, a £50,000 reward was offered for their return. At the time of his death, the coins had yet to be recovered. The collection had not been photographed or formally catalogued, as so any knowledge that could have been gleaned from them was lost after the theft.

== Personal life ==
In 1966, he married The Honourable Deborah Charlotte Buchan, daughter of the 3rd Baron Tweedsmuir. Together they had three children.

== Honours ==
In 1971, Stewartby was awarded the Sanford Saltus Gold Medal by the British Numismatic Society in recognition of his contributions to British numismatics. He was awarded the medal of the Royal Numismatic Society in 1996.

On 30 March 1970, Stewartby was elected a Fellow of the Society of Antiquaries of London (FSA). In 1981, he was elected a Fellow of the British Academy (FBA) in the archaeology section. In 1986, he was elected a Fellow of the Royal Society of Edinburgh (FRSE).

In the 1991 Queen's Birthday Honours, he was appointed a Knight Bachelor "for political service". On 26 November, he received the accolade from Queen Elizabeth II at Buckingham Palace.

== Arms ==
Coat of arms of Ian Stewart, Baron Stewartby
Crest A lymphad as in the shield between two fleurs-de-lys Or. Escutcheon Or a fess chequy Azure and Argent between a portcullis with chains in chief and a lymphad sails furled oars in action Sable flagged Gules in base all within a bordure Azure a label of three points Gules. Supporters Dexter a stag Proper attired Or gorged with a collar engrailed Gules sinister a lion Proper gorged with a collar engrailed chequy Argent and Gules. Motto There Remaineth A Rest

== Sources ==
- Times Guide to the House of Commons 1987

Parliament of the United Kingdom
Preceded by Shirley Williams	Member of Parliament for Hitchin; Feb 1974–1983	Constituency abolished
New constituency	Member of Parliament for North Hertfordshire; 1983–1992	Succeeded by Oliver Heald
