= Godfrey Collins =

British politician

Sir Godfrey Collins KBE, CMG, PC

Secretary of State for Scotland
- In office 28 September 1932 – 29 October 1936
- Prime Minister: Ramsay MacDonald; Stanley Baldwin
- Preceded by: Archibald Sinclair
- Succeeded by: Walter Elliot

Chief Whip of the Liberal Party
- In office 8 November 1924 – 4 November 1926
- Deputy: Robert Hutchison
- Leader: H. H. Asquith
- Preceded by: Vivian Phillipps
- Succeeded by: Robert Hutchison

Lord Commissioner of the Treasury
- In office 8 August 1919 – 10 February 1920
- Prime Minister: David Lloyd George
- Preceded by: John Pratt
- Succeeded by: William Sutherland

Member of Parliament for Greenock
- In office 15 January 1910 – 13 October 1936
- Preceded by: Halley Stewart
- Succeeded by: Robert Gibson

Personal details
- Born: Godfrey Pattison Collins; 26 June 1875
- Died: 13 October 1936 (aged 61)
- Party: National Liberal (1931–1936)
- Other political affiliations: Liberal (Before 1916, 1921–1931); Coalition Liberal (1916–1921)

Sir Godfrey Pattison Collins, KBE, CMG, PC (26 June 1875 – 13 October 1936) was a Scottish Liberal Party (and later National Liberal Party) politician.

== Early life and career ==
He entered the Royal Navy in 1888 and was a midshipman, East Indian Station from 1890 to 1893.

== Political career ==
He was elected as Liberal Member of Parliament (MP) for Greenock in 1910 and sat for the constituency until his death (from 1931 as a Liberal National).

He was Parliamentary Private Secretary to J. B. Seely, as Secretary of State for War from 1910 to 1914, and to J. W. Gulland, Chief Liberal Whip from 1915. He served in Egypt, Gallipoli, and Mesopotamia from 1915 to 1917, and was appointed a lieutenant-colonel in September 1916. He was a Junior Lord of the Treasury from 1919 to 1920 and Chief Liberal Whip from November 1924 to 1926. From 1932 to 1936 he served as Secretary of State for Scotland.

As Secretary of State, he was responsible for over thirty Bills affecting Scotland, chiefly: a scheme for the creation of smallholdings, the Herring Industry Act of 1935 (establishing the Herring Industry Board), the Illegal Trawling (Scotland) Act, the Education (Scotland) Bill of 1936, which sought to raise the school leaving age to fifteen from 1939, and the Housing (Scotland) Act of 1935, which laid down a statutory standard of overcrowding and sought to effect widespread slum clearances and the building of low-rent accommodation for low-wage earners.

=== Elections contested ===
==== UK Parliament elections ====
Date of election	Constituency	Party	Votes	%	Result
1910 (Jan)	Greenock	Liberal	4,233	61.7	Elected
1910 (Dec)	Greenock	Liberal	4,338	59.8	Elected
1918	Greenock	Coalition Liberal	10,933	48.0	Elected
1922	Greenock	Liberal	10,520	36.6	Elected
1923	Greenock	Liberal	16,337	61.3	Elected
1924	Greenock	Liberal	12,752	48.6	Elected
1929	Greenock	Liberal	11,190	32.5	Elected
1931	Greenock	Liberal National	18,013	51.1	Elected
1935	Greenock	Liberal National	20,299	52.7	Elected

== Personal life ==
He was appointed a CMG in 1917, KBE in 1919 and a Privy Counsellor in 1932.

Parliament of the United Kingdom
Preceded by Halley Stewart	Member of Parliament for Greenock; 1910–1936	Succeeded by Robert Gibson
Party political offices
Preceded by Vivian Phillips	Liberal Chief Whip; 1924–1926	Succeeded by Robert Hutchison
Political offices
Preceded by Sir Archibald Sinclair	Secretary of State for Scotland; 1932–1936	Succeeded by Walter Elliot
