= Greenock (UK Parliament constituency) =

Parliamentary constituency in the United Kingdom, 1832–1974

- Former burgh constituency for the House of Commons

1832–1974
- Seats: One
- Created from: Renfrewshire
- Replaced by: Greenock & Port Glasgow

Greenock was a burgh constituency represented in the House of Commons of the Parliament of the United Kingdom from 1832 until 1974, when it was abolished and its area was merged into the new Greenock and Port Glasgow constituency.

== Boundaries ==
The boundaries of the constituency, as set out in the Representation of the People (Scotland) Act 1832, were-

"From the Point, on the West of the Town, at which the Shore of the Firth of Clyde is met by the March between the Parishes of Greenock and Innerkip, up the said March to that Point thereof which is nearest to the Southern Point of the Ridge of Bow Hill; thence in a straight Line to the said Point on Bow Hill; thence in a straight Line to the Southern End of the Upper East Reservoir for supplying Greenock with Water; thence in a straight Line, in the Direction of the highest projecting Point of Knocknair Hill, to the Point near Woodhead Quarry, at which such straight Line cuts the Easternmost of the Two Rivulets which form the Lady Burn; thence down such Rivulet and the Lady Burn to the Point at which the same joins the Firth of Clyde; thence along the Shore of the Firth of Clyde to the Point first described."

1885–1918: The existing parliamentary borough, and so much of the municipal borough of Greenock as was not already included in the parliamentary borough.

== Members of Parliament ==
| Election | Member | Party |
|---|---|---|
| 1832 | Robert Wallace | Whig |
| 1845 by-election | Walter Baine | Whig |
| 1847 | William Elliot-Murray-Kynynmound | Whig |
| 1852 | Alexander Murray Dunlop | Whig |
| 1859 | Alexander Murray Dunlop | Liberal |
| 1868 | James Grieve | Liberal |
| 1878 by-election | James Stewart | Liberal |
| 1884 by-election | Thomas Sutherland | Liberal |
| 1886 | Thomas Sutherland | Liberal Unionist |
| 1892 | John Bruce | Liberal |
| 1892 | Sir Thomas Sutherland | Liberal Unionist |
| 1900 | James Reid | Unionist |
| 1906 | Halley Stewart | Liberal |
| Jan 1910 | Sir Godfrey Collins | Liberal |
| 1916 | Sir Godfrey Collins | Coalition Liberal |
| 1921 | Sir Godfrey Collins | Liberal |
| 1931 | Sir Godfrey Collins | National Liberal |
| 1936 by-election | Robert Gibson | Labour |
| 1941 by-election | Hector McNeil | Labour |
| 1955 by-election | Dickson Mabon | Labour Co-operative |
| Feb 1974 | constituency abolished: see Greenock & Port Glasgow | |

== Election results ==
=== Elections in the 1830s ===
General election 1832: Greenock
| Party | Candidate | Votes | % |
|---|---|---|---|
| Whig | Robert Wallace | 493 | 65.3 |
| Tory | John Fairrie | 262 | 34.7 |
| Majority | | 231 | 30.6 |
| Turnout | | 755 | 76.6 |
| Registered electors | | 985 | |
| Whig win (new seat) | | | |

General election 1835: Greenock
| Party | Candidate | Votes | % |
|---|---|---|---|
| Whig | Robert Wallace | Unopposed | |
| Registered electors | | 1,170 | |
| Whig hold | | | |

General election 1837: Greenock
| Party | Candidate | Votes | % |
|---|---|---|---|
| Whig | Robert Wallace | 401 | 66.5 |
| Conservative | James Smith | 202 | 33.5 |
| Majority | | 199 | 33.0 |
| Turnout | | 603 | 56.6 |
| Registered electors | | 1,065 | |
| Whig hold | | | |

=== Elections in the 1840s ===
General election 1841: Greenock
| Party | Candidate | Votes | % | ±% |
|---|---|---|---|---|
| Whig | Robert Wallace | 406 | 56.8 | −9.7 |
| Conservative | Thomas John Cochrane | 309 | 43.2 | +9.7 |
| Majority | | 97 | 13.6 | −19.4 |
| Turnout | | 715 | 64.2 | +7.6 |
| Registered electors | | 1,113 | | |
| Whig hold | | Swing | −9.7 | |

Wallace resigned, causing a by-election.

By-election, 18 April 1845: Greenock
| Party | Candidate | Votes | % | ±% |
|---|---|---|---|---|
| Whig | Walter Baine | 350 | 50.4 | N/A |
| Whig | Alexander Murray-Dunlop | 344 | 49.6 | N/A |
| Majority | | 6 | 0.8 | −12.8 |
| Turnout | | 694 | 59.6 | −4.6 |
| Registered electors | | 1,165 | | |
| Whig hold | | Swing | N/A | |

General election 1847: Greenock
| Party | Candidate | Votes | % | ±% |
|---|---|---|---|---|
| Whig | William Elliot-Murray-Kynynmound | 456 | 59.1 | N/A |
| Whig | Alexander Murray-Dunlop | 315 | 40.9 | N/A |
| Majority | | 141 | 18.2 | +4.6 |
| Turnout | | 771 | 70.8 | +6.6 |
| Registered electors | | 1,089 | | |
| Whig hold | | Swing | N/A | |

=== Elections in the 1850s ===
General election 1852: Greenock
| Party | Candidate | Votes | % | ±% |
|---|---|---|---|---|
| Whig | Alexander Murray-Dunlop | 470 | 64.9 | +24.0 |
| Conservative | James Dalrymple-Horn-Elphinstone | 254 | 35.1 | New |
| Majority | | 216 | 29.8 | +11.6 |
| Turnout | | 724 | 62.2 | −8.6 |
| Registered electors | | 1,164 | | |
| Whig hold | | Swing | N/A | |

General election 1857: Greenock
| Party | Candidate | Votes | % | ±% |
|---|---|---|---|---|
| Whig | Alexander Murray-Dunlop | Unopposed | | |
| Registered electors | | 1,405 | | |
| Whig hold | | | | |

General election 1859: Greenock
| Party | Candidate | Votes | % | ±% |
|---|---|---|---|---|
| Liberal | Alexander Murray-Dunlop | Unopposed | | |
| Registered electors | | 1,524 | | |
| Liberal hold | | | | |

=== Elections in the 1860s ===
General election 1865: Greenock
| Party | Candidate | Votes | % | ±% |
|---|---|---|---|---|
| Liberal | Alexander Murray-Dunlop | Unopposed | | |
| Registered electors | | 1,871 | | |
| Liberal hold | | | | |

General election 1868: Greenock
| Party | Candidate | Votes | % | ±% |
|---|---|---|---|---|
| Liberal | James Grieve | 2,962 | 58.6 | N/A |
| Independent Liberal | William Dougal Christie | 2,092 | 41.4 | New |
| Majority | | 870 | 17.2 | N/A |
| Turnout | | 5,054 | 81.2 | N/A |
| Registered electors | | 6,223 | | |
| Liberal hold | | Swing | N/A | |

=== Elections in the 1870s ===
General election 1874: Greenock
| Party | Candidate | Votes | % | ±% |
|---|---|---|---|---|
| Liberal | James Grieve | Unopposed | | |
| Registered electors | | 6,330 | | |
| Liberal hold | | | | |

Grieve resigned, causing a by-election.

1878 Greenock by-election
| Party | Candidate | Votes | % | ±% |
|---|---|---|---|---|
| Liberal | James Stewart | 2,183 | 36.0 | N/A |
| Conservative | James Fergusson | 2,124 | 35.0 | New |
| Liberal | Donald Currie | 1,648 | 27.2 | N/A |
| Independent Liberal | William Dundas Scott Moncrieff | 108 | 1.8 | New |
| Majority | | 59 | 1.0 | N/A |
| Turnout | | 6,063 | 81.4 | N/A |
| Registered electors | | 7,446 | | |
| Liberal hold | | Swing | N/A | |

=== Elections in the 1880s ===
General election 1880: Greenock
| Party | Candidate | Votes | % | ±% |
|---|---|---|---|---|
| Liberal | James Stewart | 3,351 | 60.8 | N/A |
| Conservative | John Scott | 2,162 | 39.2 | N/A |
| Majority | | 1,189 | 21.6 | N/A |
| Turnout | | 5,513 | 76.5 | N/A |
| Registered electors | | 7,203 | | |
| Liberal hold | | Swing | N/A | |

Stewart's resignation caused a by-election.

By-election, 28 Nov 1884: Greenock
| Party | Candidate | Votes | % | ±% |
|---|---|---|---|---|
| Liberal | Thomas Sutherland | 3,548 | 59.5 | −1.3 |
| Conservative | John Scott | 2,417 | 40.5 | +1.3 |
| Majority | | 1,131 | 19.0 | −2.6 |
| Turnout | | 5,965 | 78.1 | +1.6 |
| Registered electors | | 7,203 | | |
| Liberal hold | | Swing | −1.3 | |

General election 1885: Greenock
| Party | Candidate | Votes | % | ±% |
|---|---|---|---|---|
| Liberal | Thomas Sutherland | 3,057 | 50.3 | −10.5 |
| Conservative | John Scott | 2,954 | 48.6 | +9.4 |
| Scottish Land Restoration | John Morrison Davidson | 65 | 1.1 | New |
| Majority | | 103 | 1.7 | −19.9 |
| Turnout | | 6,076 | 85.2 | +8.7 |
| Registered electors | | 7,131 | | |
| Liberal hold | | Swing | −10.0 | |

General election 1886: Greenock
| Party | Candidate | Votes | % | ±% |
|---|---|---|---|---|
| Liberal Unionist | Thomas Sutherland | 2,905 | 56.8 | +8.2 |
| Liberal | Harold Wright | 2,208 | 43.2 | −7.1 |
| Majority | | 697 | 13.6 | N/A |
| Turnout | | 5,113 | 71.7 | −13.5 |
| Registered electors | | 7,131 | | |
| Liberal Unionist gain from Liberal | | Swing | +7.7 | |

=== Elections in the 1890s ===
General election 1892: Greenock
| Party | Candidate | Votes | % | ±% |
|---|---|---|---|---|
| Liberal Unionist | Thomas Sutherland | 2,942 | 50.5 | −6.3 |
| Liberal | John Bruce | 2,887 | 49.5 | +6.3 |
| Majority | | 55 | 1.0 | −12.6 |
| Turnout | | 5,829 | 83.4 | +11.7 |
| Registered electors | | 6,992 | | |
| Liberal Unionist hold | | Swing | -6.3 | |

The original count gave a majority of 44 for Bruce; after an election petition and recount, this was revised to a majority of 55 for Sutherland. See the list of election petitions for details.

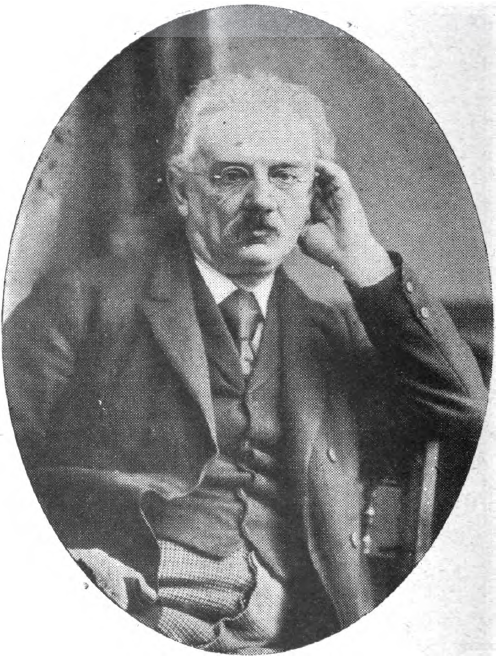
Fletcher

General election 1895: Greenock
| Party | Candidate | Votes | % | ±% |
|---|---|---|---|---|
| Liberal Unionist | Thomas Sutherland | 3,571 | 56.5 | +6.0 |
| Lib-Lab | Alfred Fletcher | 2,753 | 43.5 | −6.0 |
| Majority | | 818 | 13.0 | +12.0 |
| Turnout | | 6,324 | 83.5 | +0.1 |
| Registered electors | | 7,570 | | |
| Liberal Unionist hold | | Swing | +6.0 | |

=== Elections in the 1900s ===
General election 1900: Greenock
| Party | Candidate | Votes | % | ±% |
|---|---|---|---|---|
| Conservative | James Reid | 3,165 | 52.3 | −4.2 |
| Liberal | John Maconie | 2,886 | 47.7 | +4.2 |
| Majority | | 279 | 4.6 | −8.4 |
| Turnout | | 6,051 | 79.7 | −3.8 |
| Registered electors | | 7,590 | | |
| Conservative hold | | Swing | −4.2 | |

Stewart

General election 1906: Greenock
| Party | Candidate | Votes | % | ±% |
|---|---|---|---|---|
| Liberal | Halley Stewart | 3,596 | 52.5 | +4.8 |
| Conservative | James Reid | 3,254 | 47.5 | −4.8 |
| Majority | | 342 | 5.0 | N/A |
| Turnout | | 6,850 | 87.6 | +7.9 |
| Registered electors | | 7,821 | | |
| Liberal gain from Conservative | | Swing | +4.8 | |

=== Elections in the 1910s ===
General election January 1910: Greenock
| Party | Candidate | Votes | % | ±% |
|---|---|---|---|---|
| Liberal | Godfrey Collins | 4,233 | 61.7 | +9.2 |
| Liberal Unionist | James Parker Smith | 2,632 | 38.3 | −9.2 |
| Majority | | 1,601 | 23.4 | +18.4 |
| Turnout | | 6,855 | 87.4 | −0.2 |
| Liberal hold | | Swing | +9.2 | |

General election December 1910: Greenock
| Party | Candidate | Votes | % | ±% |
|---|---|---|---|---|
| Liberal | Godfrey Collins | 4,338 | 59.8 | −1.9 |
| Conservative | Samuel Chapman | 2,913 | 40.2 | +1.9 |
| Majority | | 1,425 | 19.6 | −2.8 |
| Turnout | | 7,251 | 88.9 | +1.5 |
| Liberal hold | | Swing | -1.9 | |

General Election 1914–15:

Another General Election was required to take place before the end of 1915. The political parties had been making preparations for an election to take place and by July 1914, the following candidates had been selected;

- Liberal: Godfrey Collins
- Unionist: Samuel Chapman

Godfrey Collins

General election 1918: Greenock
| Party | Candidate | Votes | % | ±% |
|---|---|---|---|---|
| National Liberal | Godfrey Collins | 10,933 | 48.0 | −11.8 |
| Unionist | Samuel Chapman* | 7,246 | 31.8 | −8.4 |
| Labour | Fred Shaw | 2,542 | 11.2 | New |
| Independent Labour | Neal Haughey** | 2,050 | 9.0 | New |
| Majority | | 3,687 | 16.2 | −3.4 |
| Turnout | | 22,771 | 66.6 | −22.3 |
| Registered electors | | 34,182 | | |
| National Liberal hold | | Swing | −1.7 | |

* Chapman was included on the final list of Coalition Coupon candidates, despite it having been agreed there would be no coupon in this constituency. Immediately after the list was published, a telegram was sent to Collins to make it clear there was no official Coalition candidate.
** Haughey was the nominee of the Greenock and District Dockers' Union.

=== Elections in the 1920s ===
Collins

General election 1922: Greenock
| Party | Candidate | Votes | % | ±% |
|---|---|---|---|---|
| Liberal | Godfrey Collins | 10,520 | 36.6 | −11.4 |
| Communist | Alec Geddes* | 9,776 | 34.1 | New |
| Unionist | John Denholm | 8,404 | 29.3 | −2.5 |
| Majority | | 744 | 2.5 | −13.7 |
| Turnout | | 28,700 | 84.8 | +18.2 |
| Registered electors | | 33,835 | | |
| Liberal hold | | Swing | −4.5 | |

* Geddes sought the election as a Labour candidate, despite being an official Communist candidate and having no Labour endorsement.

General election 1923: Greenock
| Party | Candidate | Votes | % | ±% |
|---|---|---|---|---|
| Liberal | Godfrey Collins | 16,337 | 61.3 | +24.7 |
| Communist | Alec Geddes* | 10,335 | 38.7 | +4.6 |
| Majority | | 6,002 | 22.6 | +20.1 |
| Turnout | | 26,672 | 78.4 | −6.4 |
| Registered electors | | 34,006 | | |
| Liberal hold | | Swing | +10.1 | |

* Geddes sought the election as a Labour candidate, despite being an official Communist candidate and having no Labour endorsement.

General election 1924: Greenock
| Party | Candidate | Votes | % | ±% |
|---|---|---|---|---|
| Liberal | Godfrey Collins | 12,752 | 48.6 | −12.7 |
| Communist | Alec Geddes | 7,590 | 29.0 | −9.7 |
| Labour | S. Kelly | 5,874 | 22.4 | New |
| Majority | | 5,162 | 19.6 | −3.0 |
| Turnout | | 26,216 | 77.8 | −0.6 |
| Registered electors | | 33,693 | | |
| Liberal hold | | Swing | −1.5 | |

General election 1929: Greenock
| Party | Candidate | Votes | % | ±% |
|---|---|---|---|---|
| Liberal | Godfrey Collins | 11,190 | 32.5 | −16.1 |
| Labour Co-op | William Leonard | 9,697 | 28.2 | +5.8 |
| Communist | Alec Geddes | 7,005 | 20.4 | −8.6 |
| Unionist | Andrew Dewar Gibb | 6,517 | 18.9 | New |
| Majority | | 1,493 | 4.3 | −15.3 |
| Turnout | | 34,409 | 78.7 | +0.9 |
| Registered electors | | 43,720 | | |
| Liberal hold | | Swing | −11.0 | |

=== Elections in the 1930s ===
General election 1931: Greenock
| Party | Candidate | Votes | % | ±% |
|---|---|---|---|---|
| National Liberal | Godfrey Collins | 18,013 | 51.1 | +18.6 |
| Labour | Thomas Irwin | 10,850 | 30.7 | +2.5 |
| Communist | Aitken Ferguson | 6,440 | 18.2 | −2.2 |
| Majority | | 7,163 | 20.4 | +16.1 |
| Turnout | | 35,303 | 80.3 | +1.6 |
| National Liberal hold | | Swing | | |

General election 1935: Greenock
| Party | Candidate | Votes | % | ±% |
|---|---|---|---|---|
| National Liberal | Godfrey Collins | 20,299 | 52.7 | +1.6 |
| Labour | Thomas Irwin | 16,945 | 44.0 | +13.3 |
| SNP | John L. Kinloch | 1,286 | 3.3 | New |
| Majority | | 3,354 | 8.7 | −15.7 |
| Turnout | | 38,530 | 84.4 | +4.1 |
| National Liberal hold | | Swing | −5.9 | |

1936 Greenock by-election
| Party | Candidate | Votes | % | ±% |
|---|---|---|---|---|
| Labour | Robert Gibson | 20,594 | 53.4 | +9.4 |
| National Liberal | Vivian Emery Cornelius | 17,990 | 46.6 | −6.1 |
| Majority | | 2,604 | 6.8 | N/A |
| Turnout | | 38,584 | 83.3 | −1.1 |
| Labour gain from National Liberal | | Swing | +7.85 | |

=== Elections in the 1940s ===
General Election 1939–40:

Another General Election was required to take place before the end of 1940. The political parties had been making preparations for an election to take place from 1939 and by the end of this year, the following candidates had been selected;

- Labour: Robert Gibson

1941 Greenock by-election
| Party | Candidate | Votes | % | ±% |
|---|---|---|---|---|
| Labour | Hector McNeil | Unopposed | N/A | N/A |

General election 1945: Greenock
| Party | Candidate | Votes | % | ±% |
|---|---|---|---|---|
| Labour | Hector McNeil | 16,186 | 47.1 | +3.1 |
| Unionist | Malcolm Douglas-Hamilton | 8,097 | 23.6 | −27.1 |
| Communist | J. R. Campbell | 5,900 | 17.2 | New |
| Liberal | George Gordon Honeyman | 4,180 | 12.2 | New |
| Majority | | 8,089 | 23.54 | +14.8 |
| Turnout | | 34,363 | 68.42 | −16.0 |
| Labour hold | | Swing | | |

=== Elections in the 1950s ===
General election 1950: Greenock
| Party | Candidate | Votes | % | ±% |
|---|---|---|---|---|
| Labour | Hector McNeil | 20,548 | 50.6 | +3.5 |
| Liberal | Ian McColl | 11,638 | 28.7 | +16.5 |
| Independent Labour | John S. Thomson | 6,458 | 15.9 | New |
| Communist | J. R. Campbell | 1,228 | 3.0 | −14.2 |
| Anti-Partition | Oliver Brown | 718 | 1.8 | New |
| Majority | | 8,910 | 21.9 | −1.6 |
| Turnout | | 40,590 | 83.2 | +14.8 |
| Labour hold | | Swing | | |

General election 1951: Greenock
| Party | Candidate | Votes | % | ±% |
|---|---|---|---|---|
| Labour | Hector McNeil | 23,452 | 57.1 | +6.5 |
| Unionist | W Ross Maclean | 17,615 | 42.9 | New |
| Majority | | 5,837 | 14.2 | −7.7 |
| Turnout | | 41,067 | 83.0 | −0.2 |
| Labour hold | | Swing | | |

General election 1955: Greenock
| Party | Candidate | Votes | % | ±% |
|---|---|---|---|---|
| Labour | Hector McNeil | 19,378 | 51.4 | −5.7 |
| Unionist | Ian MacArthur | 18,345 | 48.6 | +5.7 |
| Majority | | 1,033 | 2.8 | −11.4 |
| Turnout | | 37,723 | | |
| Labour hold | | Swing | | |

1955 Greenock by-election
| Party | Candidate | Votes | % | ±% |
|---|---|---|---|---|
| Labour Co-op | Dickson Mabon | 19,698 | 53.7 | +2.3 |
| Unionist | Ian MacArthur | 17,004 | 46.3 | −2.3 |
| Majority | | 2,694 | 7.4 | +4.6 |
| Turnout | | 36,702 | | |
| Labour Co-op hold | | Swing | | |

General election 1959: Greenock
| Party | Candidate | Votes | % | ±% |
|---|---|---|---|---|
| Labour Co-op | Dickson Mabon | 19,320 | 50.6 | −3.1 |
| Liberal | William T C Riddell | 10,238 | 26.8 | New |
| Unionist | Leonard Mackenzie Turpie | 8,616 | 22.6 | −23.7 |
| Majority | | 9,082 | 23.8 | +16.5 |
| Turnout | | 38,174 | | |
| Labour Co-op hold | | Swing | | |

=== Elections in the 1960s ===
General election 1964: Greenock
| Party | Candidate | Votes | % | ±% |
|---|---|---|---|---|
| Labour Co-op | Dickson Mabon | 19,627 | 55.1 | +4.5 |
| Liberal | Campbell M Barclay | 9,055 | 25.4 | −1.4 |
| Unionist | Duncan Robert Gordon Sillars | 6,473 | 18.2 | −4.4 |
| Independent Labour | John Stevenson Thomson | 458 | 1.3 | New |
| Majority | | 10,572 | 29.7 | +5.9 |
| Turnout | | 35,613 | | |
| Labour Co-op hold | | Swing | | |

General election 1966: Greenock
| Party | Candidate | Votes | % | ±% |
|---|---|---|---|---|
| Labour Co-op | Dickson Mabon | 18,988 | 57.1 | +2.0 |
| Liberal | Iain M Will | 7,727 | 23.2 | −2.2 |
| Conservative | Ronald Edgar Dundas | 5,835 | 17.5 | −0.7 |
| Communist | William Dunn | 702 | 2.1 | New |
| Majority | | 11,261 | 33.9 | +4.2 |
| Turnout | | 33,252 | 73.6 | |
| Labour Co-op hold | | Swing | | |

=== Elections in the 1970s ===
General election 1970: Greenock
| Party | Candidate | Votes | % | ±% |
|---|---|---|---|---|
| Labour Co-op | Dickson Mabon | 19,334 | 53.7 | −3.4 |
| Liberal | William T C Riddell | 16,100 | 44.7 | +21.5 |
| Communist | Alex Murray | 559 | 1.6 | −0.5 |
| Majority | | 3,234 | 9.0 | −24.9 |
| Turnout | | 35,993 | 75.0 | +1.4 |
| Labour Co-op hold | | Swing | | |
