= 1878 Greenock by-election =

UK Parliamentary by-election

The 1878 Greenock by-election was fought on 25 January 1878. The by-election was called due to the resignation of the incumbent Liberal MP, James Johnston Grieve. It was won by the Liberal candidate James Stewart.

1878 Greenock by-election
Party	Candidate	Votes	%	±%
Liberal	James Stewart	2,183	36.0	N/A
Conservative	James Fergusson	2,124	35.0	New
Liberal	Donald Currie	1,648	27.2	N/A
Independent Liberal	William Dundas Scott Moncrieff	108	1.8	New
Majority		59	1.0	N/A
Turnout		6,063	81.4	N/A
Registered electors		7,446		
Liberal hold		Swing	N/A	
