= Bernard Halley Stewart =

British physician

Bernard Halley Stewart FRSE
- Born: 6 May 1874; St. Leonards-on-Sea, England
- Died: 30 July 1958 (aged 84); Hadley Wood, England
- Education: Cambridge University
- Occupation: Physician
- Spouse: Mabel Wyatt
- Children: 1, Harold
- Father: Halley Stewart
- Relatives: Percy Stewart (brother); Ian Stewart (grandson)
- Military career
- Service: Royal Army Medical Corps
- Wars: World War I

Bernard Halley Stewart FRSE (6 May 1874–30 July 1958) was a British physician during the 20th century.

== Life ==
He was born in St. Leonards-on-Sea on 6 May 1874, the son of Sir Halley Stewart and his wife, Jane Elizabeth Atkinson. He was educated at University College School in Hastings then in Bishop's Stortford.

He then studied for a general degree at Cambridge University graduating MA in 1896, and allowing him to then study Medicine there, graduating MB ChB in 1906/7. He was awarded his doctorate (MD) in 1911. In the First World War he served with the Royal Army Medical Corps in France. On return he set up as a GP in East Bergholt in Suffolk before moving to Barnet. In 1937 he established the Sir Halley Stewart Trust in memory of his father and served as its first President.

In 1939 he was elected a Fellow of the Royal Society of Edinburgh. His proposers were Thomas J. Mackie, Sir George Newman, Sir Sydney Smith and Alfred Joseph Clark.

He died at West House, Broadgates Park, Hadley Wood in Hertfordshire on 30 July 1958.

== Family ==
He married Mabel Florence Wyatt. They had one son Harold Charles Stewart, in turn father to Ian Stewart, Baron Stewartby.
