= Greenock and Inverclyde (UK Parliament constituency) =

UK Parliament constituency (1997–2005)

- Former burgh constituency for the House of Commons
- Boundary of Greenock and Inverclyde in Scotland for the 2001 general election

1997–2005
- Seats: One
- Created from: Greenock & Port Glasgow; Renfrew West & Inverclyde
- Replaced by: Inverclyde

Greenock and Inverclyde was a burgh constituency represented in the House of Commons of the Parliament of the United Kingdom from 1997 until 2005, when it was replaced by the Inverclyde constituency. It elected one Member of Parliament (MP) using the first-past-the-post voting system.

== Boundaries ==
The Inverclyde District electoral divisions of Greenock Central East, Greenock South West, and Inverclyde West.

The constituency included all of the council area of Inverclyde except the wards covering Port Glasgow and Kilmacolm, which were in the West Renfrewshire constituency.

The unusual choice of name (since the town of Greenock is in Inverclyde) reflects the fact that the constituency was created from parts of two predecessor constituencies, Greenock and Port Glasgow and Renfrew West and Inverclyde.

== Members of Parliament ==
Election	Member	Party
1997	Norman Godman	Labour
2001	David Cairns	Labour
2005	constituency abolished: see Inverclyde	

== Election results ==
=== Elections of the 2000s ===
General election 2001: Greenock and Inverclyde
Party	Candidate	Votes	%	±%
Labour	David Cairns	14,929	52.5	−3.7
Liberal Democrats	Chic Brodie	5,039	17.7	+3.9
SNP	Andrew Murie	4,248	14.9	−3.7
Conservative	Alistair Haw	3,000	10.6	−0.9
Scottish Socialist	David Landels	1,203	4.2	New
Majority		9,890	34.8	−2.8
Turnout		28,419	59.3	−11.5
Labour hold		Swing		

=== Elections of the 1990s ===
General election 1997: Greenock and Inverclyde
Party	Candidate	Votes	%	±%
Labour	Norman Godman	19,480	56.2	+8.4
SNP	Brian J. Goodall	6,440	18.6	+1.3
Liberal Democrats	Rod Ackland	4,791	13.8	−0.1
Conservative	Hugo Swire	3,976	11.5	−9.6
Majority		13,040	37.6	
Turnout		34,687	70.8	
Labour win (new seat)				

== See also ==
- Greenock and Inverclyde (Scottish Parliament constituency)
