= 1955 Greenock by-election =

UK parliamentary by-election

The 1955 Greenock by-election was a parliamentary by-election held on 8 December 1955 for the British House of Commons constituency of Greenock in Renfrewshire, Scotland.

The vacancy had been created by the death of the incumbent Labour MP Hector McNeil, and the seat was won by the future Labour Minister Dickson Mabon.

== Candidates ==
Labour selected Mabon, who at only thirty would become the youngest Labour MP. He had served as a Bevin Boy and in the army. He had been chairman of the Labour Club (1948–50), then chairman of the National Association of Labour Students in 1949–1950, and finally president of Glasgow University Union in 1951–52, and of the Scottish Union of Students, 1954–55.

The Unionist candidate was Ian MacArthur, who was also thirty, and who worked as an associate director of a marketing and advertising company; he had also contested the seat at the general election earlier that year.

== Previous result ==
General election 1955: Greenock
Party	Candidate	Votes	%	±%
Labour	Hector McNeil	19,378	51.4	−5.7
Unionist	Ian MacArthur	18,345	48.6	+5.7
Majority		1,033	2.8	−11.4
Turnout		37,723		
Labour hold		Swing		

== By-election result ==
Greenock by-election, 1955
Party	Candidate	Votes	%	±%
Labour	Dickson Mabon	19,698	53.7	+2.3
Unionist	Ian MacArthur	17,004	46.3	−2.3
Majority		2,694	7.4	+4.6
Turnout		36,702		
Labour hold		Swing		
