= Kincardineshire by-election =

Kincardineshire by-election may refer to:

- 1872 Kincardineshire by-election
- 1908 Kincardineshire by-election
- 1919 Aberdeenshire and Kincardineshire Central by-election
- 1939 Kincardineshire and Western Aberdeenshire by-election
