= Wishart baronets =

Extinct baronetcy in the Baronetage of Nova Scotia

The Wishart Baronetcy, of Clifton Hall in the County of Edinburgh, was a title in the Baronetage of Nova Scotia. It was created on 17 June 1706 for George Wishart. Emilia Stuart Belches was heir general of the original grantee and was apparently allowed to succeed to the baronetcy. Assuming she did succeed, she was one of only five female baronets - see also Bolles (created 1635), Dalyell (created 1685), Dunbar (created 1706) and Maxwell (created 1682). The fourth Baronet sat as Member of Parliament for Kincardineshire. The title became dormant on his death in 1821.

== Wishart baronets, of Clifton Hall (1706) ==
- Sir George Wishart, 1st Baronet (died by 1722)
- Sir William Stuart, 2nd Baronet (died 1777)
- Dame Emilia Stuart Belches, 3rd Baronetess (died 1807)
- Sir John Stuart, 4th Baronet (Wishart-Belches until Oct 1797) (c. 1752–1821)

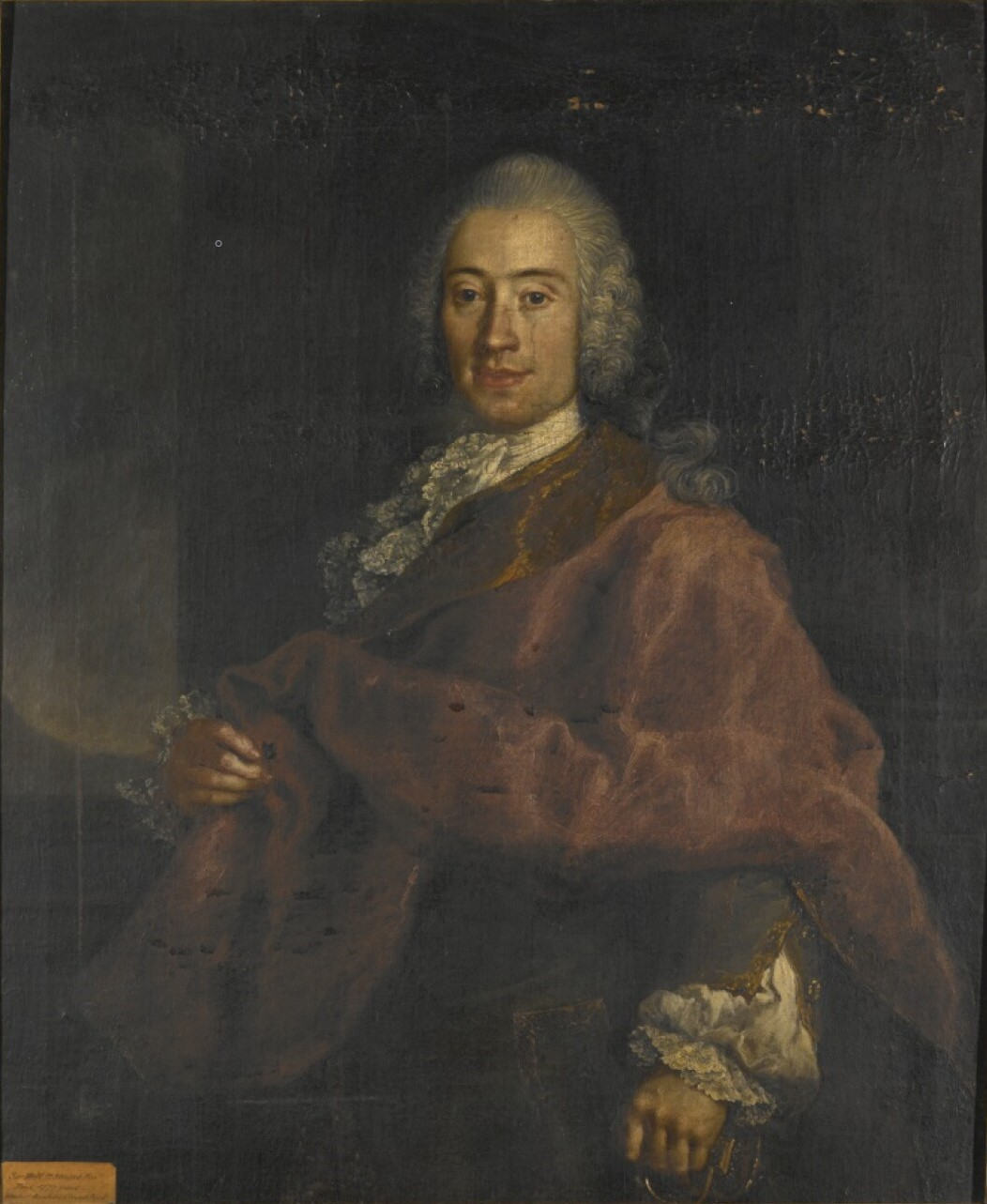
Sir William Stuart,
2nd Baronet

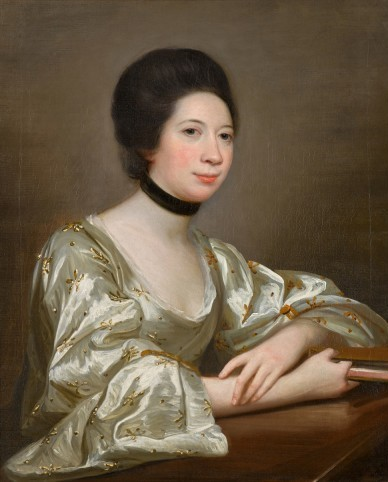
Dame Emilia Stuart Belches,
3rd Baronetess

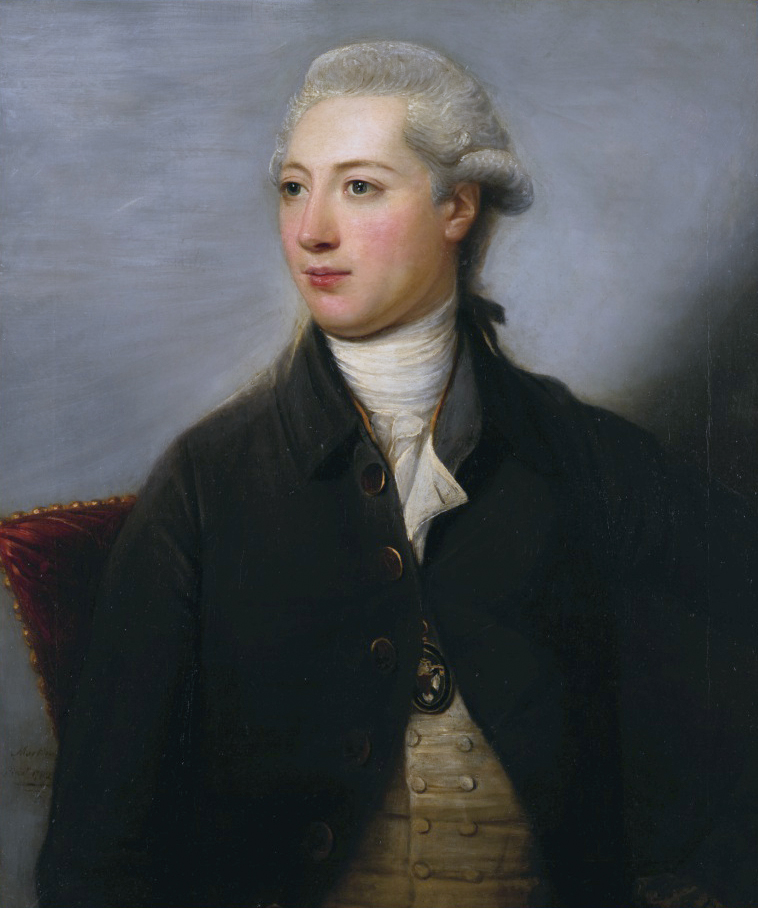
Sir John Stuart,
4th Baronet
