= James Scott (British Army officer, died 1747) =

Lieutenant-General James Scott (c. 1672–1747), of Commieston, Kincardine, was a British Army officer and politician who sat in the House of Commons from 1713 to 1734. He served in the Scots Guards for 51 years

Scott was the second son of Hercules Scott of Brotherton, Kincardine and his wife Jane Ogilvy, daughter of Sir James Ogilvy, of New Grange, Forfar a commissioner to the Parliament of Scotland. He joined the army and was an ensign in the Scots Guards in 1692. He became lieutenant and captain in 1693, and captain and lieutenant-colonel in 1694. In 1712 he became a brevet colonel. He married. Margaret Wallace, daughter of Hugh Wallace, of Ingliston, Midlothian, a commissioner to the Parliament of Scotland, in April. 1712,

Scott acquired some property in the Kincardineshire in 1708, probably from his uncle John Scott of Commieston, and stood for parliament at Kincardineshire at the 1710 general election. He was unsuccessful then but was returned as Member of Parliament at the 1713 general election. In 1713 he became a 2nd major. He was considered to be a Tory. He told in favour of the election of John Houston for Linlithgowshire, and on 12 May he voted against extending the schism bill to cover Catholic education. However, as one of the Scottish MPs then in London, he signed the proclamation of George I, and was described as a Whig.

Scott was re-elected MP for Kincardineshire in a contest at the 1715 general election. He served the Hanoverians loyally, and voted consistently for the Court in all divisions. In 1717 he became 1st major in the Guards. In 1721, the committee of inquiry into the South Sea bubble revealed that he had accepted £1,000 stock from the Company without paying for it. He was returned unopposed in the general election of 1722 and became lieutenant-colonel commanding his regiment in 1723. At the 1727 general election, he was returned unopposed again. He stood down at the 1734 general election to make way for his son to succeed him in the seat although he was defeated.

Scott became brigadier-general in 1735, major.-general in. 1739 and lieutenant-general in 1743. He died in 1747 leaving a son John, and a daughter.

Parliament of Great Britain
Preceded by Sir Alexander Ramsay, Bt	Member of Parliament for Kincardineshire; 1713–1734	Succeeded by John Falconer
