= Sir John Stuart, 4th Baronet =

Scottish politician

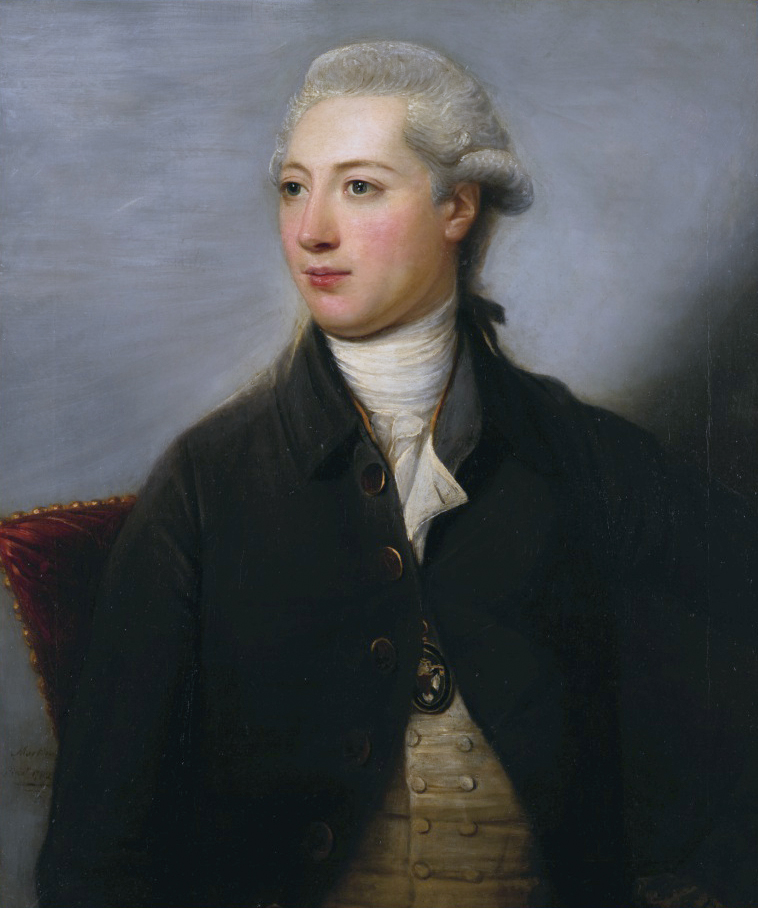
John Wishart Belsches (David Martin, 1782)

Sir John Stuart, 4th Baronet (born Wishart-Belsches; c. 1752 – 4 December 1821) was a Scottish MP in the Parliament of Great Britain. His adopted the surname Stuart in October 1797. He was MP for Kincardineshire between 1797–1806 and 1802-06 as Sir John Stuart.

== Biography ==
He was the only son of William Belsches, Esq., (by his wife and cousin Emilia, only surviving child of John Belsches, of Invermay, by his wife Mary Stuart (died 1807), 2nd daughter of Sir George Wishart, 1st Baronet, so created 17 June 1706, with remainder to the heirs of his body).

Stuart assumed the Wishart Baronetcy in 1777 in dubious circumstances on the death of his great-uncle, Sir William Stuart, 2nd Baronet after taking legal advice, although it was not disputed in his lifetime. He also assumed the surname of Stuart in lieu of Wishart-Belsches by Royal licence in October 1797. Now it is accepted that women can be baronets his mother is today considered to have rightfully been the 3rd Baronet even though her son was already using the title.

He was elected M.P. for Kincardineshire as above and became a Baron of the Exchequer in Scotland from 1807 until his death.

He married, on 9 November 1775, Lady Jane Leslie, the eldest daughter of David Melville, 6th Earl of Leven. She died on 28 October 1829. They had a daughter, Williamina Stuart (died 5 December 1810; married Sir William Forbes, 7th Baronet).

On his death with no heir the Wishart baronetcy of Clifton Hall, Edinburgh became dormant.

Parliament of Great Britain
Preceded by Robert Barclay Allardice	Member of Parliament for Kincardineshire; 1797–1800	Succeeded by Parliament of the United Kingdom
Parliament of the United Kingdom
Preceded by Parliament of Great Britain	Member of Parliament for Kincardineshire; 1801–1806	Succeeded by William Adam
Baronetage of Nova Scotia
Preceded by Emilia Stuart Belches	Baronet (of Clifton Hall); 1807–1821	Dormant
