= John Falconer (MP) =

Scottish Whig politician

John Falconer (21 October 1674 – 21 November 1764), of Phesdo, Kincardine, was a Scottish Whig politician who sat in the House of Commons from 1734 to 1741. He was a staunch Francophile.

Falconer was the eldest son of Sir James Falconer, Lord Phesdo, Shire Commissioner, and his wife Elizabeth Trent. He was admitted as an advocate in 1700. In 1701 and 1702 he was a Commissioner of justiciary for the Highlands. He succeeded his father in 1705. When he was young, he lived for a long time in France and developed a great admiration and affection for the country.

At the 1734 British general election, Falconer was returned with the support of George Keith, Earl of Kintore as a Whig Member of Parliament for Kincardineshire in a contest against the sitting Whig MP. He voted steadily in support of Walpole's administration without asking any favour. When asked to explain, he said he admired the French way of government and considered Walpole's measures would help to make Britain one day a province of France which he considered a blessing. He did not stand again at the 1741 British general election.

Falconer died unmarried on 21 November 1764, aged 90. He was described as a very keen golfer and a very facetious, pleasing companion.

Parliament of Great Britain
Preceded by James Scott	Member of Parliament for Kincardineshire; 1734–1741	Succeeded by Sir James Carnegie, Bt
