= James Dyce Nicol =

Scottish businessman and Liberal politician

James Dyce Nicol (13 August 1805 – 16 November 1872) was a Scottish businessman, and then a Liberal politician who sat in the House of Commons from 1865 to 1872.

Nicol was the son of William Nicol MD RN (1765–1827) of Stonehaven and his wife Margaret Dyce, daughter of merchant James Dyce of Aberdeen. He was educated at the University of Glasgow.

He was a partner in the firm of William Nichol and Company of Bombay, where he lived for many years until he retired in 1844, and then a director of the Borneo Company Limited from its inception in 1856 until 1869. Additionally, he was a deputy lieutenant and J.P. for Aberdeenshire and Kincardineshire, and a Fellow of the Royal Geographical Society.

Nicol married Catherine Loyd, daughter of Edward Loyd, banker of London and Manchester in 1844. They had three sons.

At the 1865 general election Nicol was elected as the Member of Parliament (MP) for Kincardineshire.

He held the seat until his death at the age of 67 in 1872.

== See also ==
- William Nicol (1790–1879), business partner

Parliament of the United Kingdom
Preceded by Sir Hugh Arbuthnot	Member of Parliament for Kincardineshire; 1865 – 1872	Succeeded by Sir George Balfour
