= Hugh Arbuthnot (British Army officer) =

British politician (1780–1868)

General The Honourable Sir Hugh Arbuthnott KCB
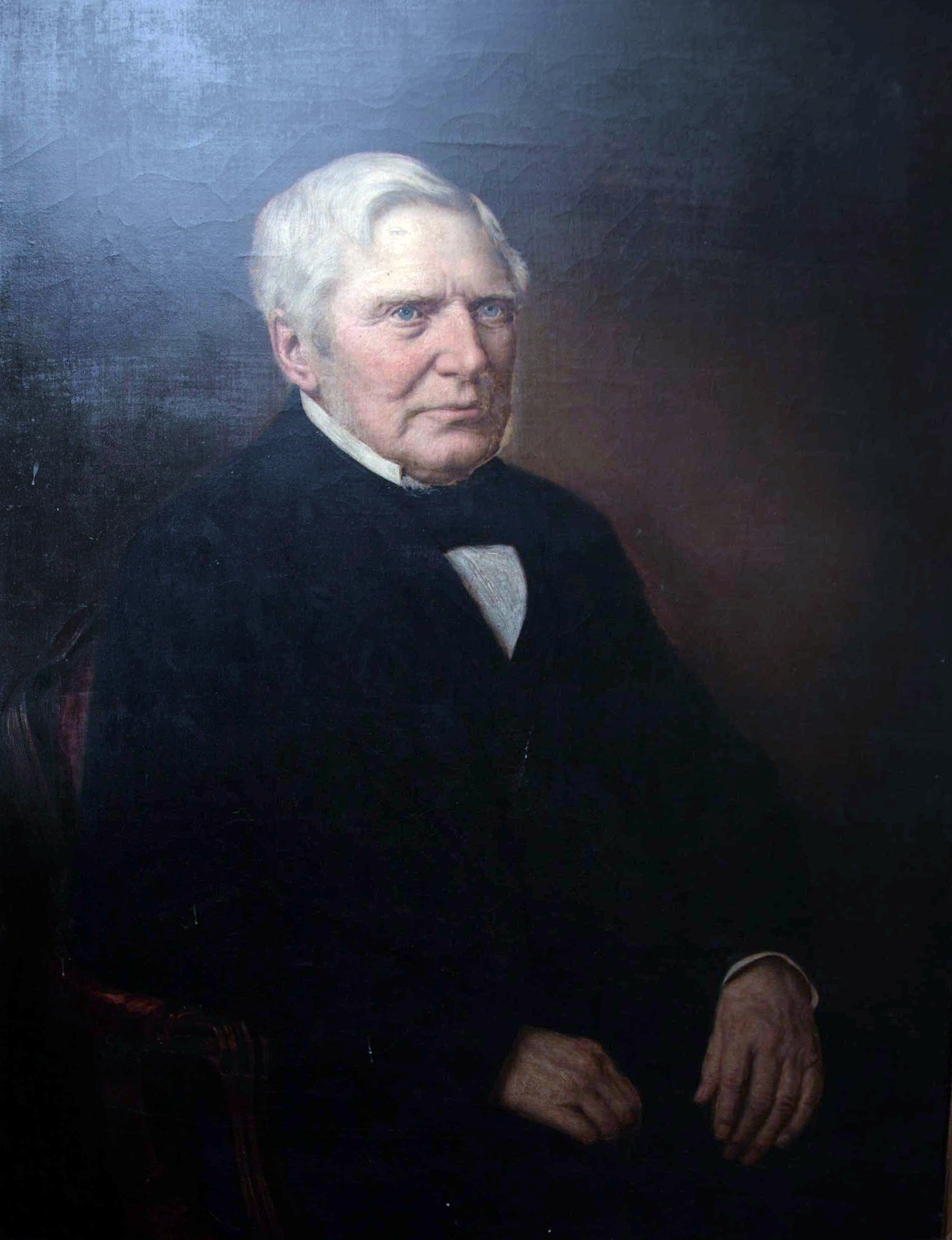
- Born: 1780
- Died: 11 June 1868 (aged 87 or 88)
- Relatives: 7th Viscount of Arbuthnott (father)
- Military career
- Allegiance: British
- Rank: General
- Commands: 79th Regiment of Foot
- Awards: CB
- Other work: Member of Parliament, Kincardineshire

General Sir Hugh Arbuthnott, KCB (1780 – 11 June 1868) was a British Army officer and Member of Parliament for Kincardineshire 1826–1865.

He was born the son of John Arbuthnott, 7th Viscount of Arbuthnott and the younger brother of John Arbuthnott, 8th Viscount of Arbuthnott.

He entered the 79th Regiment of Foot (Cameron Highlanders) as ensign in May 1796 and was promoted major-general on 22 July 1830, lieutenant-general on 23 November 1841 and full general on 20 June 1854.

He was given the colonelcy of the 38th (1st Staffordshire) Regiment of Foot from 1843 to 1862, transferring as colonel back to the Cameron Highlanders from 14 March 1862 to his death in 1868.

Sir Hugh never married.

Military offices
Preceded by Sir William Henry Sewell	Colonel of the 79th Regiment of Foot (Cameron Highlanders); 1862–1868	Succeeded by John Francis Glencairn Campbell
Preceded by Sir Jasper Nicolls	Colonel of the 38th (1st Staffordshire) Regiment of Foot; 1843–1862	Succeeded by Sir William Mansfield, 1st Baron Sandhurst
Parliament of the United Kingdom
Preceded by Sir Alexander Ramsay, Bt	Member of Parliament for Kincardineshire; 1826–1865	Succeeded by James Dyce Nicol
