= John William Crombie =

Scottish woollen manufacturer (1858–1908)

John William Crombie

John William Crombie (4 March 1858 – 22 March 1908) was a Scottish woollen manufacturer, folklorist and Liberal Party politician.

== Early life ==
Crombie was born in Aberdeenshire, the eldest son of John Crombie of Balgownie Lodge, near Aberdeen. He attended the Gymnasium School, Old Aberdeen and went on to the University of Aberdeen where he obtained an MA degree. He also studied in France and Germany.

== Career ==
Crombie's father was a member of the manufacturing family the Crombies of Cothal Mills and Grandholm and in 1880 Crombie followed him into the family business, becoming a Director of J. & J. Crombie, Ltd, woollen manufacturers, the company founded 1806 by his grandfather. In 1892 he resigned from the business to take up politics.

== Politics ==
=== Member of Parliament ===
Crombie was elected Liberal MP for Kincardineshire at the 1892 general election. At this election Crombie faced a Liberal Unionist opponent, J Stephen. Crombie held the seat for the Liberals with a majority of 1,068 votes.

=== 1895–1906 ===
The Unionists had improved their organisation in the constituency by the time of the 1895 general election and Crombie faced a sterner test, this time opposed by the Honourable Charles S Forbes Trefusis. It was reported that Trefusis was popular in the county as a local landowner but Crombie held on with a majority of 583.

In 1900 Crombie faced a new Conservative opponent, Mr J Mowat the Provost of Stonehaven. However, in an election which saw the Unionists confirmed in power, Crombie's constituency was one where the Liberal performance was said to be one of the strongest in Scotland and he won with a majority of 1,556.

In 1906 he again faced a new Conservative opponent, S J Gammell. In the Liberal landslide election year Crombie had his most comfortable majority ever, 2,353 votes.

=== Appointments ===
Crombie served as Private Secretary to James Bryce, when he was Chancellor of the Duchy of Lancaster (1892–94) and President of the Board of Trade (1894–95). Crombie was also Deputy Lieutenant for Aberdeenshire. In 1896 Crombie was appointed to be a member of a Board of Agriculture Departmental committee to report into the working of laws relating to dogs. The committee reported in early 1897. They made important recommendations on measures to be adopted to prevent and control rabies. They also called for a tougher stance by local authorities, now to be aided by the police, to ensure effective dog licensing, which had been largely evaded by dog owners to that point and more powers to enable muzzling for safety, cut down sheep-worrying and to prevent disease. He was later appointed to a committee to inquire into the probable economic effect of a limit to the eight hours to the working day of coal miners.

=== Political stance ===
Usually described as a Radical or Gladstonian, Crombie was an orthodox free-trader, as his letter to the editor of The Times newspaper of 6 October 1903 demonstrated. In the letter he attacked the proposals of Prime Minister Arthur Balfour with specific examples drawn from his experience as a woollen manufacturer and from other industries. He warned of the dangers of retaliatory action by foreign governments leading to higher and higher tariffs on all sides. Another source describes Crombie and "an Advanced Liberal" in favour of Irish Home Rule. Crombie was also a member of the Parliamentary Temperance Group, a classical concern of Victorian and Edwardian Liberals. In 1901, he sponsored a Bill to prevent the sale of intoxicating liquor to children under 16 years. The Bill became law later that year, although the age of the children affected was reduced to 14 years.

== Publications ==
In 1890, Crombie published a book of poetical, literary and folkloric sketches entitled Some Poets of the People in Foreign Lands (Eliot Stock, London, 1890 and 2nd edition, 1891). The interest in poetry ran in the family. Crombie's son Eugene, a Captain in the Gordon Highlanders in World War I, was a war poet. He died in 1917. Crombie's interest in folklore led him to write and review learned articles on the subject. In 1886, he published an article in the Journal of the Anthropological Institute of Great Britain and Ireland on the 'History of the Game of Hop Scotch' and the origins of its name. He also wrote articles on topical and political subjects for magazines such as the Westminster Review and Nineteenth Century. His death was announced in Folk-Lore, the journal of the Folklore Society in 1908.

== Death ==
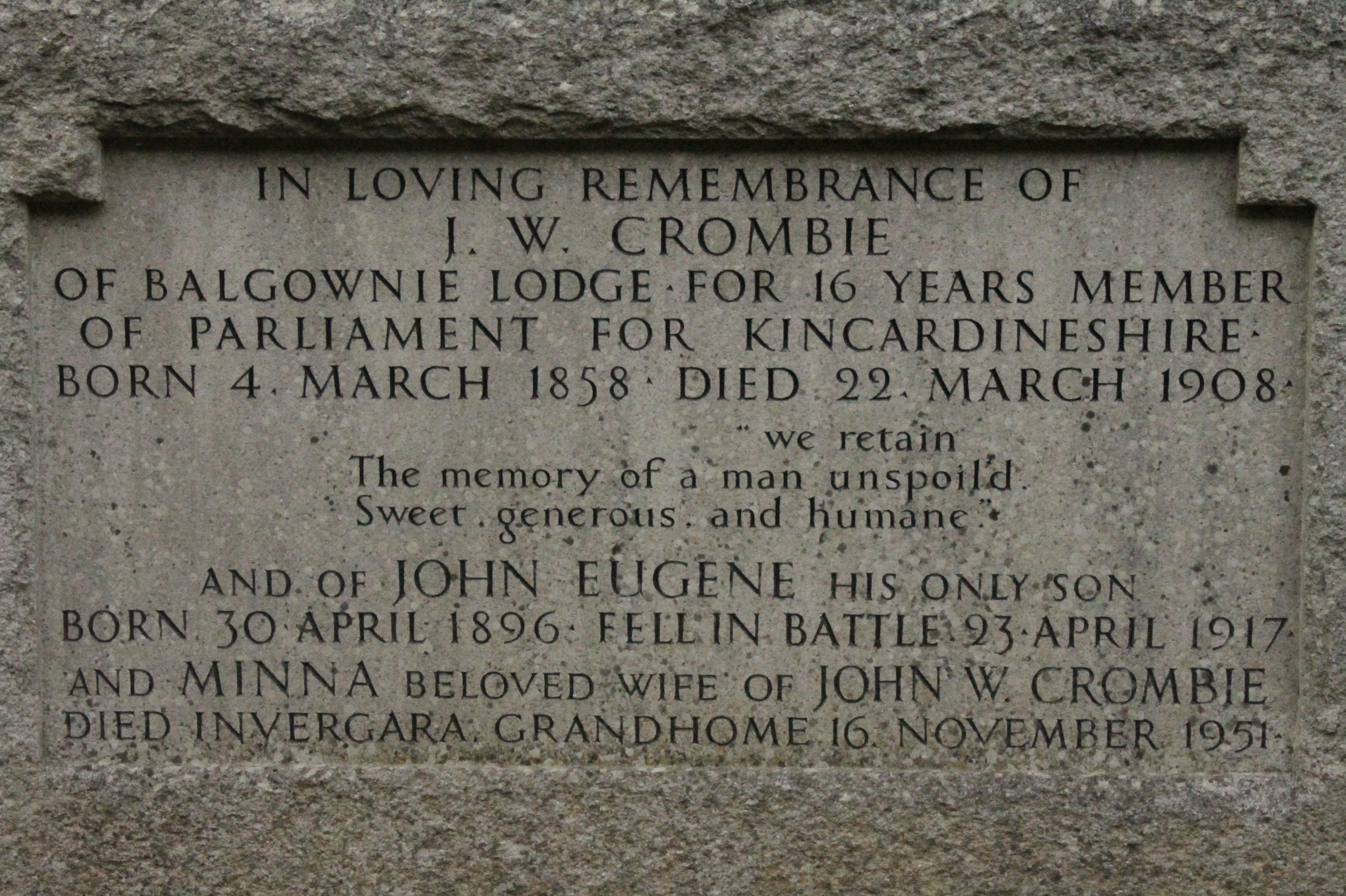
The grave of James William Crombie, St Machar's Cathedral churchyard

Although he had a major country estate at Balgownie Lodge in Scotland, Crombie died at his London home in Onslow Square in Kensington on 22 March 1908, aged only 50 years. He had been unwell for some time and had been confined to bed for three weeks. His funeral was held at St. Machar's Cathedral, Aberdeen and a Memorial service was also held at St. Margaret's, Westminster. The grave lies in the narrow section north of the church.

His death occasioned a by-election in his Kincardineshire constituency, held on 25 April 1908. The seat was held for the Liberals by Captain, The Honourable Arthur Cecil Murray.

== Family ==
In 1895 he married Minna Wason (d.1951), the daughter of Eugene Wason, MP.

They had one son, John Eugene Crombie (1896-1917), who died near Roeux at the Battle of Arras whilst serving in the Gordon Highlanders in the First World War, and a daughter, Fenella, who married John Paton and became an activist and prominent member of the Liberal Party herself.

His younger brother was the mill-owner, philanthropist and amateur seismologist, James Edward Crombie FRSE (1862-1932).

Parliament of the United Kingdom
Preceded by Sir George Balfour	Member of Parliament for Kincardineshire; 1892 – 1908	Succeeded by Arthur Murray
