= James Edward Crombie =

Seismologist

James Edward Crombie FRSE LLD (22 October 1862 – 6 August 1932) was a Scottish philanthropist, meteorologist and seismologist. He was a major benefactor of Aberdeen University. He underwrote the costs of several seismological projects undertaken by Oxford University.

The Crombie Halls of Residence (1960), Aberdeen University's first purpose-built student accommodation, are named after him. Designed by Robert Matthew Johnston Marshall the property became a listed building in 2005.

== Life ==
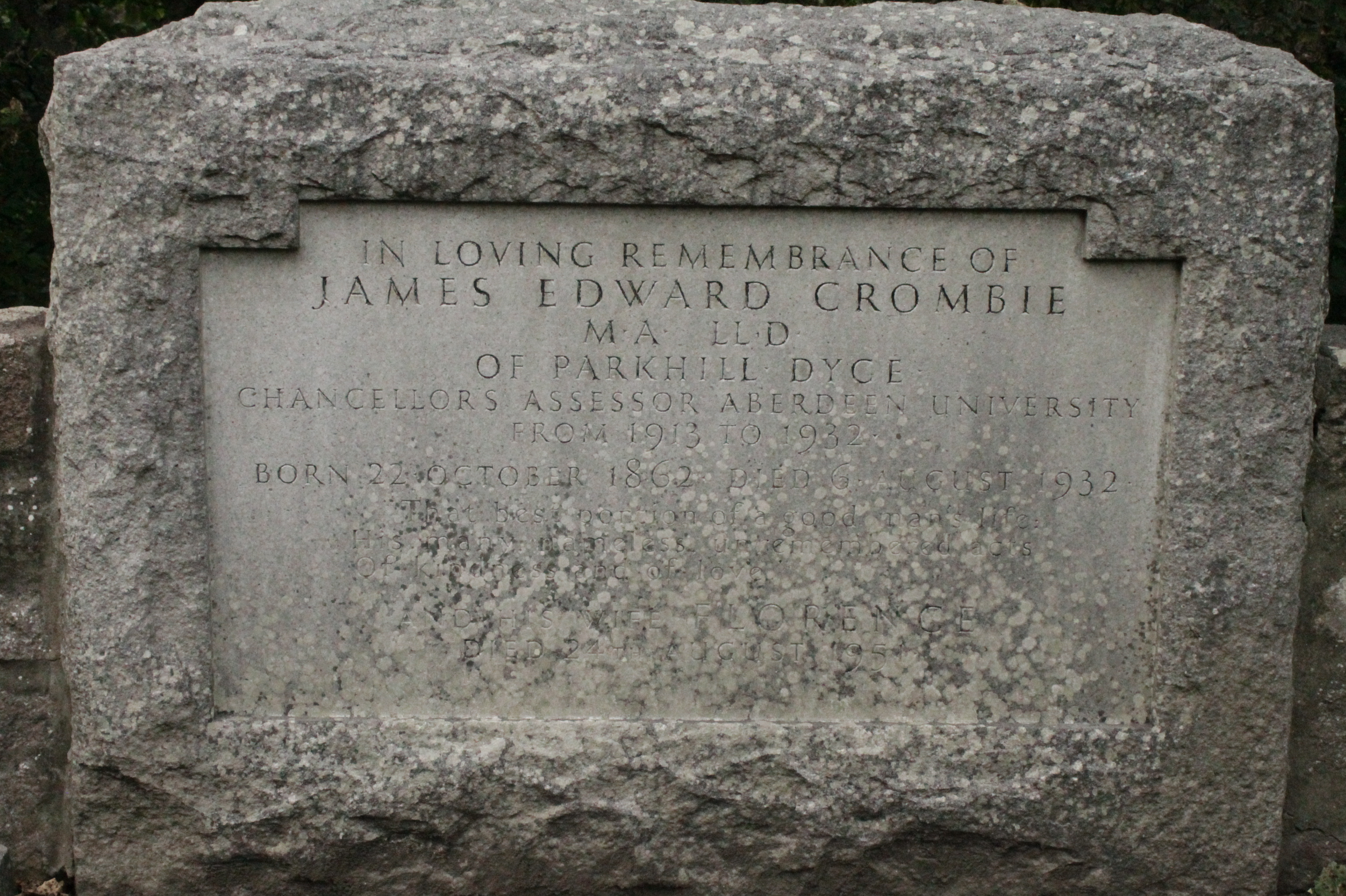
The grave of James Edward Crombie, St Machar's Cathedral churchyard

He was born at Grandholm Lodge in Old Aberdeen in Aberdeenshire on 22 October 1862, the second son of John Crombie (1819-1894), a wool mill owner, of the Grandholme Works, later known as Crombies of Fetternear. His mother was Jane Sang, daughter of John Sang of 61 Great King Street, Edinburgh. His older brother was John William Crombie, MP for Kincardineshire. He was educated in Aberdeen. He then studied at King's College in Aberdeen University, graduating MA in 1882, and thereafter becoming a Company Director in the family firm of Grandholm Woollen Manufacturing Works.

His financial background allowed him the time to travel widely. He explored much of Europe (probably with his brother John) and wrote on many topics, with a special interest in death and burial customs. He was also a keen amateur meteorologist and seismologist, with a large collection of scientific apparatus relating to these subjects, housed in a specially constructed laboratory on his family estate. He gave financial support to the University of Oxford in their investigations of seismology, funding projects under Herbert Hall Turner.

In 1907 his alma mater awarded him an honorary doctorate (LLD). He was elected a Fellow of the Royal Society of Edinburgh in 1916 for his contributions to meteorology and seismology. His proposers were John Arthur Thomson, Cargill Gilston Knott, John Rennie and Alexander Fraser.

He died on 6 August 1932 in Parkhill House, north-east of Dyce in Aberdeenshire. He is buried in the churchyard of St Machar's Cathedral in Old Aberdeen. The grave lies close to the north-east corner of the church.

He left a large sum to the University of Aberdeen and is memorialised by a brass plaque in King's College there.

== Family ==
He married Florence Dolly Showell (b.1874) in Enville, Staffordshire in September 1895.
