= George Balfour (Liberal politician) =

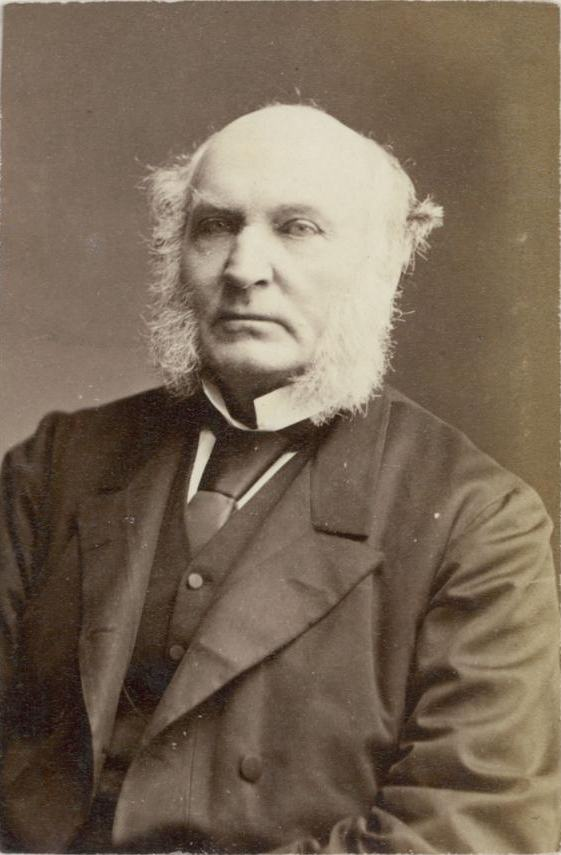

General Sir George Balfour KCB (8 December 1809 – 12 March 1894) was a British Army officer and a Liberal politician who sat in the House of Commons from 1872 to 1892.

== Career ==
Balfour was the son of the George Balfour, of Montrose and an older brother of Edward Green Balfour. He was educated at the Addiscombe Military Seminary and became a lieutenant in the Madras Artillery in 1825. From 1832, he served with Malacca Field Force and was Staff Officer of Artillery with the Malacca Field Force from 1832 to 1833 when it was active in the capture of Chusan, Canton, and Amoy. He was adjutant of Artillery from 1833 to 1842, and A.A.G. from 1834 to 1835, He was with the Field Force in the ceded districts, and in action of Zorapore in 1839 when he became Brigade Major in India. From 1840 to 1842 he was in China with the China Force. He was agent for captured property in China from 1841 to 1842 and receiver of public money paid by China under the Treaty of Nanking.

=== China ===
He arrived in Shanghai on 8 November 1843 aboard the streamer Medusa, and immediately began discussions with the ranking local Chinese official, the Taotai (道台), on the opening of foreign trade and the site of a foreign settlement.

Shanghai was declared open to foreign trade on 14 November 1843, and agreement was reached on the terms under which the foreign settlement would be established. A total of 138 acres along the Huangpu River bank, immediately north of the walled city, became "English Ground" and later the International Settlement. The Chinese official position was that land could not be sold outright to foreigners, but a compromise was reached whereby it was allowed for land to be rented in perpetuity. Balfour first rented a house within the Shanghai town walls for use as the official British consular residence. He left the post of Shanghai consul in 1846, and was replaced by Rutherford Alcock.

=== India ===
Balfour joined the Madras Army as a staff officer in April 1840 and served under General Montgomerie in China. He continued to work with the Madras detachment until June 1842. In June 1842 he became Brigade-Major for the Artillery of the Force in China.

In 1854, Balfour was promoted to lieutenant-colonel and awarded the CB. He became colonel in 1856 and was Inspector-General of Ordnance, in Madras from 1857 to 1859, member of Military Finance Commission of India from 1859 to 1860 and president of the Finance Committee and chairman of the Military. Finance Department of India from 1860 to 1862.

=== Political achievements ===
In 1865 he was promoted to major-general and was a member of Royal Commission on Recruiting for the Army from 1866 to 1867, and assistant to the Controller-in-Chief at the War Office from 1868 to 1871. He was awarded KCB in 1870

Balfour was elected Member of Parliament for Kincardineshire at a by-election in 1872. He held the seat until 1892.

Balfour was promoted to lieutenant general in 1874, and to general in 1877 when he was colonel-commandant of the Royal Artillery. He was a Deputy Lieutenant and J.P. for Kincardineshire.

=== Other activities ===
Balfour was an active member of the Royal Geographical Society where he became an ardent supporter of the theory that anthropogenic causes, particularly deforestation, had caused desiccation and other climate changes in India and other parts of the British Empire. His brother Edward Balfour also supported this view and worked towards conservation measures for forests.

== Marriage and death ==
Balfour married in 1848 Charlotte Isabella Hume, daughter of Joseph Hume M.P. Balfour died at the age of 84.

Parliament of the United Kingdom
Preceded by James Dyce Nicol	Member of Parliament for Kincardineshire; 1872 – 1892	Succeeded by John William Crombie
