= Robert Hepburn =

Robert Rickart Hepburn
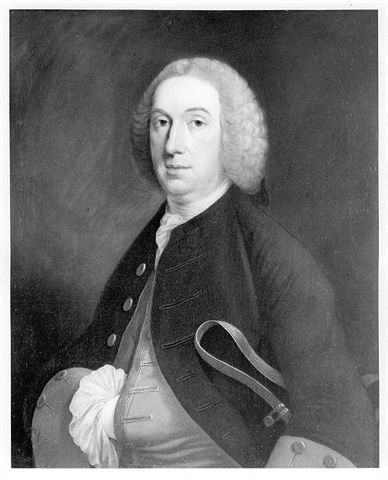
- Born: 1720
- Died: 1804 (aged 83–84)
- Military career
- Allegiance: British
- Rank: Colonel
- Other work: Member of Parliament, Kincardineshire

Colonel Robert Rickart Hepburn of Keith (1720 – 24 May 1804) was Member of Parliament for Kincardineshire 1768–1774.

== Biography ==
He was the son of James Hepburn of Keith and Katherine Rickart and was educated at Edinburgh high school and the University of Edinburgh. He succeeded to his father's estate at Keith in Haddington and to his mother's estate at Rickarton in Kincardine.

He joined the British Army in 1743 as a cornet in the 6th (Inniskilling) Dragoons, was promoted captain in 1745, major in 1755, and lieutenant-colonel in 1763. He commanded the Inniskillings at the Battle of Minden in 1759. He sold out of the Army in 1768 and became MP for Kincardineshire. He bought the barony of Congalton in the parish of Dirleton, Haddington (now East Lothian).

He died in 1804 and was buried in the church at Gullane in Dirleton. He had married Magdalen, the daughter of Colonel William Murray and had 3 daughters and 2 sons.

Parliament of the United Kingdom
Preceded by Sir Alexander Ramsay-Irvine, 6th Bt	Member of Parliament for Kincardineshire; 1768–1774	Succeeded by Lord Adam Gordon
