= James Falconer, Lord Phesdo =

Scottish landowner, judge and politician

James Falconer, Lord Phesdo (1648–1705) was a Scottish landowner, judge, politician and Senator of the College of Justice.

== Life ==
Falconer was born on 16 August 1648 at Alves in Moray, one of at least 11 children of John Falconer (1620-1682), Master of the Scottish Mint. As the mint was located many miles away in Edinburgh the father, if not the whole family, also had lodgings in the capital. James' mother, Esther Briot, was the daughter of Nicholas Briot a famous French coin-designer, who had come to Scotland in 1633 as a Huguenot exile, and worked closely with the Scottish Mint, which was located on the Cowgate in Edinburgh.

James was educated in Edinburgh then trained as a lawyer and qualified as an advocate in January 1674. He had his legal practice in Edinburgh. Falconer purchased the Phesdo estate, near Fettercairn, in the 1680s. In November 1689 he was elected a Senator of the College of Justice and adopted the title Lord Phesdo.

He was the Member of Parliament for Kincardineshire in 1703/4.

He died in Edinburgh on 9 June 1705 aged 57 and is buried in Greyfriars Churchyard in the city centre. His position as Senator was filled by George Elliot, Lord Minto.

Phesdo House was rebuilt in 1815.

== Family ==
He was married to Elizabeth Trent. Their children, which numbered at least 13, included John Falconer (MP).
