= Fenella Paton =

Scottish birth control activist and philanthropist

- Born: 29 January 1901; London
- Died: 21 October 1949 (aged 48); Aberdeen
- Other name: Fenella Crombie
- Spouse: John David Paton (Married 1923 - 1949)
- Parent: Minna Wason (Mother) John W. Crombie (Father)
- Relatives: Eugene Wason (Grandfather)

Fenella Paton or Fenella Crombie (29 January 1901 – 21 October 1949) was a philanthropist and pioneer of women. She founded the first birth control clinic in Aberdeen.

== Early life ==
Paton was born in London to Minna Wason and John W. Crombie.

She was born into a political family. Her father was a Liberal MP for Kincardineshire and her grandfather was Liberal MP Eugene Wason.

Paton married John David Paton, of Grandhome, in 1923. They resided in Aberdeen and had two sons and four daughters.

== Aberdeen Women's Welfare Centre ==
Inspired by Marie Stopes work, Paton founded the Aberdeen Women's Welfare Centre in 1926. It provided advice on birth control to local women.

Paton ran the clinic along with volunteers. Initially the team consisted of a family doctor, Dr Florence Malcolm, and a Nurse, Mrs Rae. Although the clinic was not associated with Marie Stopes' organisation, Paton and Stopes corresponded and Stopes visited the clinic in 1933. After this visit, Dr Kathleen Fraser was appointed.

The clinic was funded by Paton, her mother, and friends. In 1935, Aberdeen City Council started to partially fund the centre. The clinic was funded by Paton until 1948, when it was transferred to the National Health Service.

Paton was also director of the Maternity Hospital and of Aberdeen Royal Infirmary.

== Philanthropy ==
Paton was a member of several charities and organisations in Aberdeen, including the YWCA.

She was praised for her involvement in St Katherine's Community Club, which helped girls from working-class backgrounds by organising social and educational activities.
