= Edward Balfour =

Scottish surgeon, orientalist and pioneering environmentalist

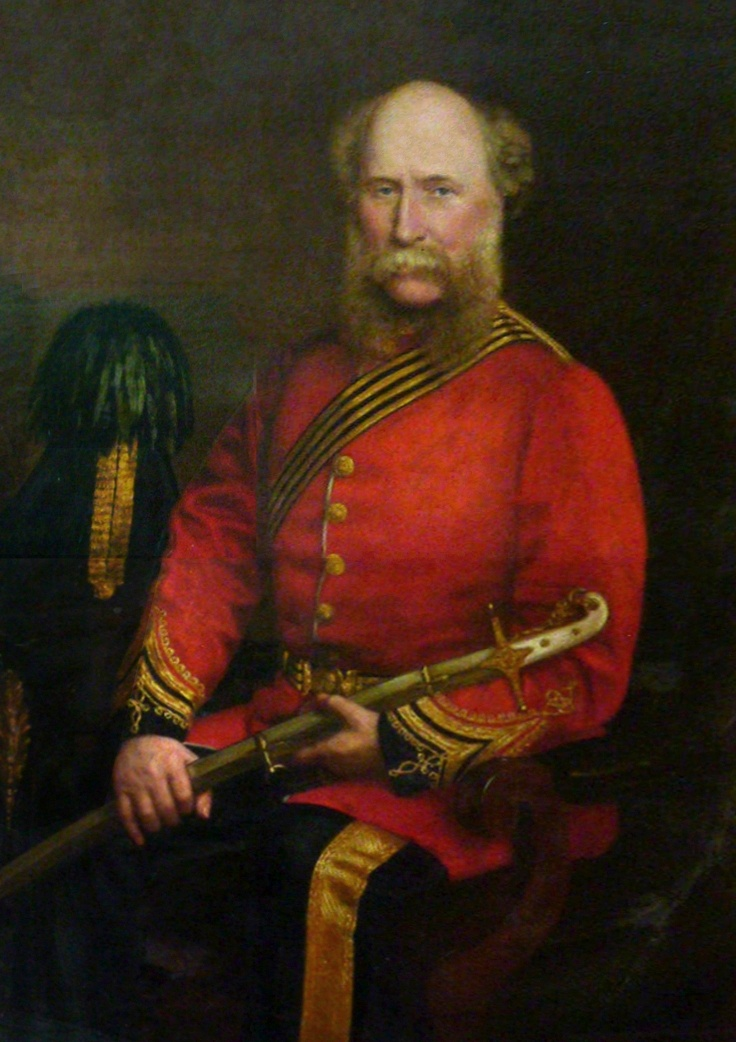
Portrait by Walter Saunders Barnard (1880) at the Madras Museum

Edward Green Balfour (6 September 1813 – 8 December 1889) was a Scottish surgeon, orientalist and pioneering environmentalist in India. He founded museums at Madras and Bangalore, a zoological garden in Madras and was instrumental in raising awareness on forest conservation and public health in India. He published a Cyclopaedia of India, several editions of which were published after 1857, translated works on health into Indian languages and wrote on a variety of subjects.

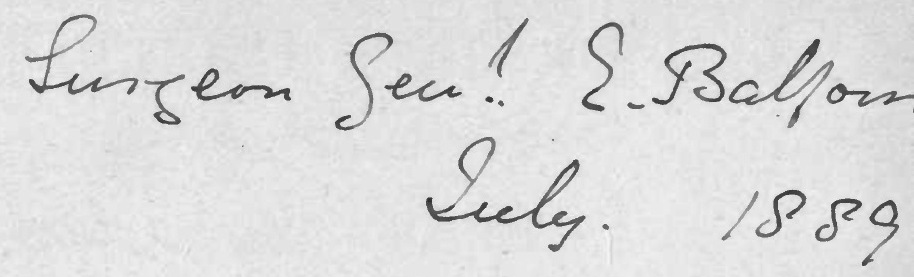
Signature

== Life and career ==
Balfour was born in Angus, Montrose, the second son of Captain George Balfour of the East India Company marine service and Susan Hume (a sister of the radical MP Joseph Hume). His elder brother was Sir George Balfour (1809–1894) who was later a liberal MP for Kincardineshire. He was educated at Montrose Academy before studying surgery at Edinburgh University and admitted Fellow of the Royal College of Surgeons of Edinburgh in 1833. A family friend arranged his commission as an assistant surgeon in the Madras medical service in India and he set sail for India in 1834. On the way he visited Mauritius where he witnessed ecological destruction about which he had read in the works of Bernardin de Saint-Pierre and Jean-Baptiste Boussingault. This created a lifelong interest in climate change and environmental problems.

On arrival in India in 1836 he was attached to a European regiment as an assistant surgeon. He was in medical charge of European and native artillery, native cavalry, Madras and Bombay infantry divisions until 1862. He served as a staff-surgeon at Ahmednagar and at Bellary, and in 1850 he acted as government agent at Chepauk and was a paymaster dealing with Carnatic stipends. His ability with languages particularly Hindi and later Persian helped his transfer into a sepoy regiment. This led him to be posted to smaller areas and he spent the next ten years travelling around southern India. He was often sought by the government as a translator of Hindustani and Persian.

In 1848 Balfour returned to Madras and he was given medical charge of the governor's bodyguard. This gave him more time to writing and other interests and he also took up additional appointments as agent to the court of the nawab of the Carnatic. From 1858 to 1861 he served on a commission to look into the debts of the nawab. In 1850, he also served as assistant assay master at the Madras mint.

In 1852 he became a full surgeon and on 24 May he married Marion Matilda Agnes Gilchrist, daughter of a fellow surgeon at Madras. He served as deputy Surgeon-General in Burma and the Straits Settlements, the Andamans and the Mysore division. From 1871 to 1876 he was Surgeon-General and headed the Madras Medical Department. Balfour's wife, Marion, would help in the proof-reading of Balfour's encyclopaedia. At the age of seven Marion had been to St. Helena where she happened to see the body of Napoleon. Edward, a son died in infancy at Bellary on 28 March 1864.

== Environmental and health ==
Balfour had seen environmental damage in Mauritius and was interested in the effect of climate on human health. During his travels he collected information on health and environmental issues. He published a report in 1845 titled Statistical Data for forming Troops and maintaining them in Health in different Climates and Localities and Observations on the Means of preserving the Health of Troops by selecting Healthy Localities for their Cantonments and these made him an authority on public health. In 1849, he wrote On the Influence exercised by Trees on the Climate of a Country in the Madras Journal of Literature and Science, 1840 which was reprinted in 1849. Using actual data to study problems and suggest solutions he wrote such works as the Statistics of Cholera and Remarks on the Causes for which Native Soldiers of the Madras Army were discharged the Service in tho five Years from 1842-3 to 1846-7 (1850). The medical training in Edinburgh had an emphasis on the importance of water in human health. Balfour recognized that since water was finite in supply, that this was a public health problem. Based on the Mauritius experience he warned of the possibility of famine due to deforestation and wrote about the links between water and forest cover in Notes on the influence exercised by trees in inducing rain and preserving moisture (Madras Journal of Literature and Science 15(1849):402-448) as well as reports to the famine commission (The influence exercised by trees on the climate and productiveness of the Peninsula of India. Famine Commission IV.). The East India Company heeded his warnings and took up forest conservation schemes soon after 1840. This and other reports by Hugh Francis Cleghorn influenced Lord Dalhousie and led to the establishment of the Madras Forest Department. The debate on deforestation induced climate change was also held in Britain where Colonel George Balfour, Edward's brother, lobbied for conservation measures while others like David Livingstone suggested that rainfall declines were related to geological changes.

=== Statistical approach ===
Balfour widely used statistics to study the state of health of the troops. In a study of health issues that was read by his uncle Joseph Hume to the Statistical Society of London, he dismissed the belief that humans adjusted to new climates and suggested that different races had varying tolerances to climate and disease. Based on his data, he showed that Europeans fared better in the hills of India.

He maintained careful records of visitors to the museum and noted how a live orangutan specimen drew large crowds. This increased support for his plan for a zoological garden and when it was established he noted that it drew more people than the British Museum, Regent's Park and Kew Gardens together.

=== Role of women ===
Recognising the importance of women in matters of public health, he personally translated Dr. J. T. Conquest's Outlines of Midwifery into Urdu and arranged for translations into Kannada, Tamil and Telugu. He noted in the preface to the Kannada edition that he offered rewards for anyone undertaking translation and that he had works published in Telugu, Tamil, apart from Kannada, but had yet to find someone to translate the work into Malayalam. He noted his objective as being "to provide a text book for Native Medical Students; to improve the practice of Native Midwives; and to make known to the learned men of India, the modes followed by the people of Europe in aiding women when in natural labor as also when the labors are difficult." He also attempted to influence the government to introduce medical education in Tamil, Telugu and Malayalam languages but failed. He worked towards encouraging European women to enter the medical service in India since he believed that women could move more freely within certain sections of Indian society. This move succeeded and in 1875, Mary Scharlieb was admitted to the Madras Medical College as its first woman applicant.

== Museums, natural history and orientalism ==
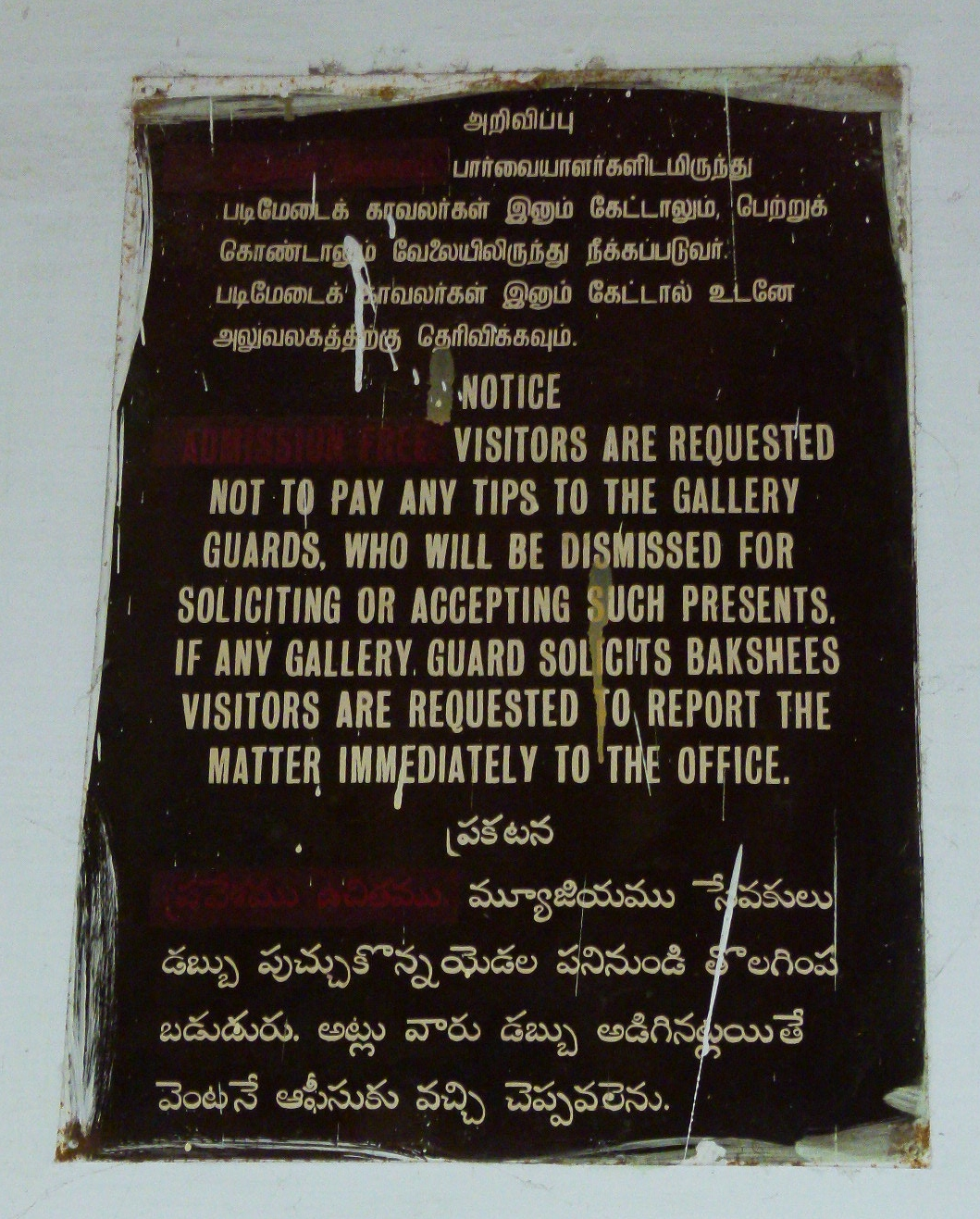
Old notice at the Madras Museum with the original "free admission" policy erased

Balfour was keen on collections and education. He founded the Government Central Museum at Madras in 1850. He became the first officer in charge of the museum at Madras. By 1879 the museum was attracting 180,000 people each year and in 1886 as much as 230,000. Women visitors were encouraged on special days. He not only kept records of the visitors but also studied the response of visitors to exhibits. He noticed a marked increase in the number of visitors when a live specimen of a tiger cub and leopard was kept in the natural history section of the museum. This led him to propose a zoological garden and this led to the creation in 1856 of a small collection of animals in the People's Park which grew into the Madras Zoological Gardens. There was pressures to move the museum to the college premises but Balfour firmly believed that the museum needed to be "...open to all classes, and contains articles calculated to amuse and instruct all classes". Initially the museum displayed items of commercial value and focussed on economic geology and forestry. It later began to acquire items of archaeology and ethnology. He encouraged contributions to the museum stating that "every specimen that may be sent will be acceptable". Material could be sent free by post if marked for the museum and sent by "Banghy Dock". The Oriental and Screw Navigation Company permitted packages for the museum to be shipped free. Material flowed in at around 1000 items a month. He considered it inappropriate to charge an admission fee since the public was donating exhibits. In a letter to Oldfield of Roorkee College on 30 May 1854, Balfour wrote that "... if the Museum were limited in its objects, it would never be formed because the residents throughout the country, rendered, by the limiting, doubtful as to what would be acceptable, would refrain from sending anything and, If I attempted to be eclectic, I would lose all..." By 1853, the museum was overflowing with more than 19,830 artefacts, mostly received from the public. Balfour believed that purchase would be needed only in the case of exceptional artefacts. In 1866 he started the Bangalore Museum in the state of Mysore. He was a secretary to the Madras Central Committee for the Great Exhibition of 1851, the Paris Exhibitions of 1855 and 1868, the International Exhibition of London (1862) and the Vienna Exhibition (1872).

Balfour took a special interest in languages and spent a lot of time learning local languages. In 1850 he published Gul-Dastah or The Bunch of Roses, a lithographed series of works by Persian and Hindustani poets. He also set up a Mohammedan Public Library in Madras and translated many works from Persian to English as well as English works (such as on astronomy) into Hindi, Tamil and Telugu. Based on his studies, he was sceptical of the state of indigenous scientific knowledge particularly in relation to health and in his Cyclopaedia suggested that Indians were so close to subsistence that they did not have the time or means to reflect accurately on their surroundings.

When Balfour resigned from his position at the museum, he sought Edward Blyth as a suitable successor but was prevented by the Madras Government to enter into a correspondence on this. His position was then taken up by Captain Jesse Mitchell who worked as Commandant of the Madras Mounted Police.

=== Cyclopaedia of India and other works ===
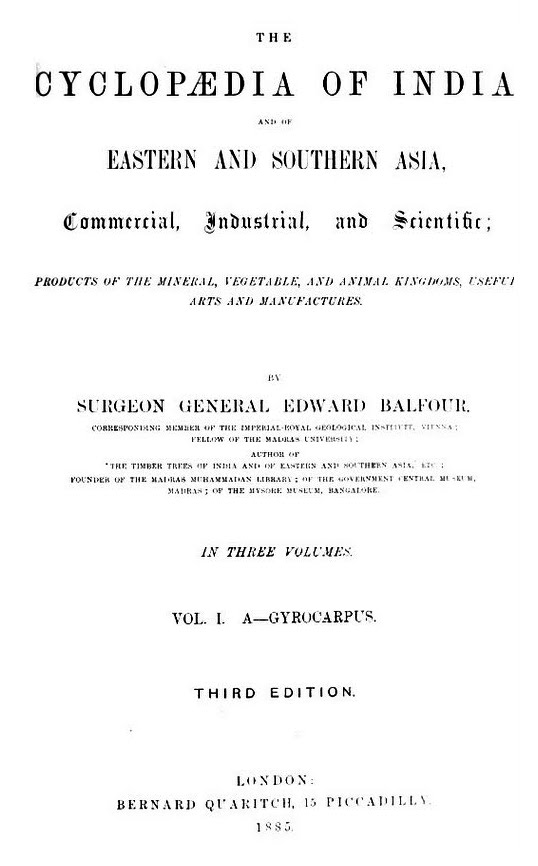
Cover of the first of the three volume 1885 (third) edition

Balfour's collations on a variety of aspects of life in India led to the publication of The Cyclopaedia of India and of Eastern and Southern Asia, Commercial, Industrial, and Scientific, first published in 1857 with subsequent editions in multiple volumes. The original work was derived from notes that he had made for the Great Exhibition of 1851. Subsequent editions incorporated research by others including Sir Dietrich Brandis and it grew into a five volume work in 1871-83. The work also was used by William Theobald in his major revision of Mason's Burmah.

Some subjects needed more coverage and he produced for instance the first work on the agricultural pests of India, in which he drew inspiration from the work of Eleanor Ormerod. He wrote in the Agricultural pests of India:

The census of 1881 showed its population to be 198,790,853 souls, of whom 69,952,747 were agriculturists, 220,803 horticulturists, 35,076 arboriculturists, and 990,342 were tending animals. In 1884-85 the revenue of British India was Rs. 70,69,06,810, of which the land-tax yielded Rs. 21,83,22,110; Rs. 8,81,64,690 were derived from opium, and Rs. 98,69,840 from forest. In that year 22,425 human beings were killed by elephants, tigers, leopards, wolves, bears, hyenas, and venomous snakes; and of cattle killed the number was 49,987. The numbers engaged in agriculture, the great revenue obtained from the lands, and the losses the people are exposed to from wild beasts, all indicate the need for protective measures...

Balfour continued to write about India after retiring to England in 1876. He openly held anti-colonialist sentiments which Richard Grove suggests as being linked to the radical ideas of his uncle Joseph Hume, opinions that were also expressed by his cousin Allan Octavian Hume. His elder brother George Balfour (and married to A.O. Hume's sister Charlotte Isabella) also argued against salt taxes in India and suggested that they hampered growth and antagonized the population of India.

== Honours and memorials ==
Balfour left India in 1876 after 42 years there, and at his farewell was felicitated in Madras by the Hindu, Muslim and European communities with a portrait of him placed in the Government Central Museum. For his distinguished services he was given an additional annual good-service pension of £100. In 1891 the Madras University established a Balfour memorial gold medal to encourage women in medicine.

== Selected works ==
- The agricultural pests of India, and of eastern and southern Asia, vegetable and animal, injurious to man and his products (1887)
- The Vydian and the Hakim, what do they know of medicine? (1875)
- Medical Hints to the People of India (1875)
- The Timber Trees, Timber and Fancy Woods, as also, the Forests (1862)
- Birds of Eastern and Southern Asia (1858)
- The Cyclopaedia of India and of Eastern and Southern Asia. 1857.
  - Edward Balfour (1885). The Cyclopaedia of India and of Eastern and Southern Asia (3rd ed.). London: B. Quaritch.. Volume 1 (A-G), Volume 2 (H-N), Volume 3. + Via HathiTrust
- Catalogue of the Government Central Museum (1855)
- Cholera (Are there towns or villages in India where cholera has never appeared from the period of its first outbreak in 1817?) being a series of letters from Assistant Surgeon Edward Balfour. Fort St. George Gazette Press. (1852)
- Remarks on the Abstract Tables of the Men Discharged from the Military Service of the East India Company. (1851)
- Statistics of cholera (1849)
- Balfour, Edward (1849). "Additional Observations on the Means of Maintaining Troops in Health". Journal of the Statistical Society of London. 12 (1): 33–42. doi:10.2307/2338245. JSTOR 2338245.
- Observations on the means of preserving the health of troops by selecting healthy localities for their Cantonments. London (1845)
