= John Tricker Conquest =

British accoucheur (male-midwife) and physician

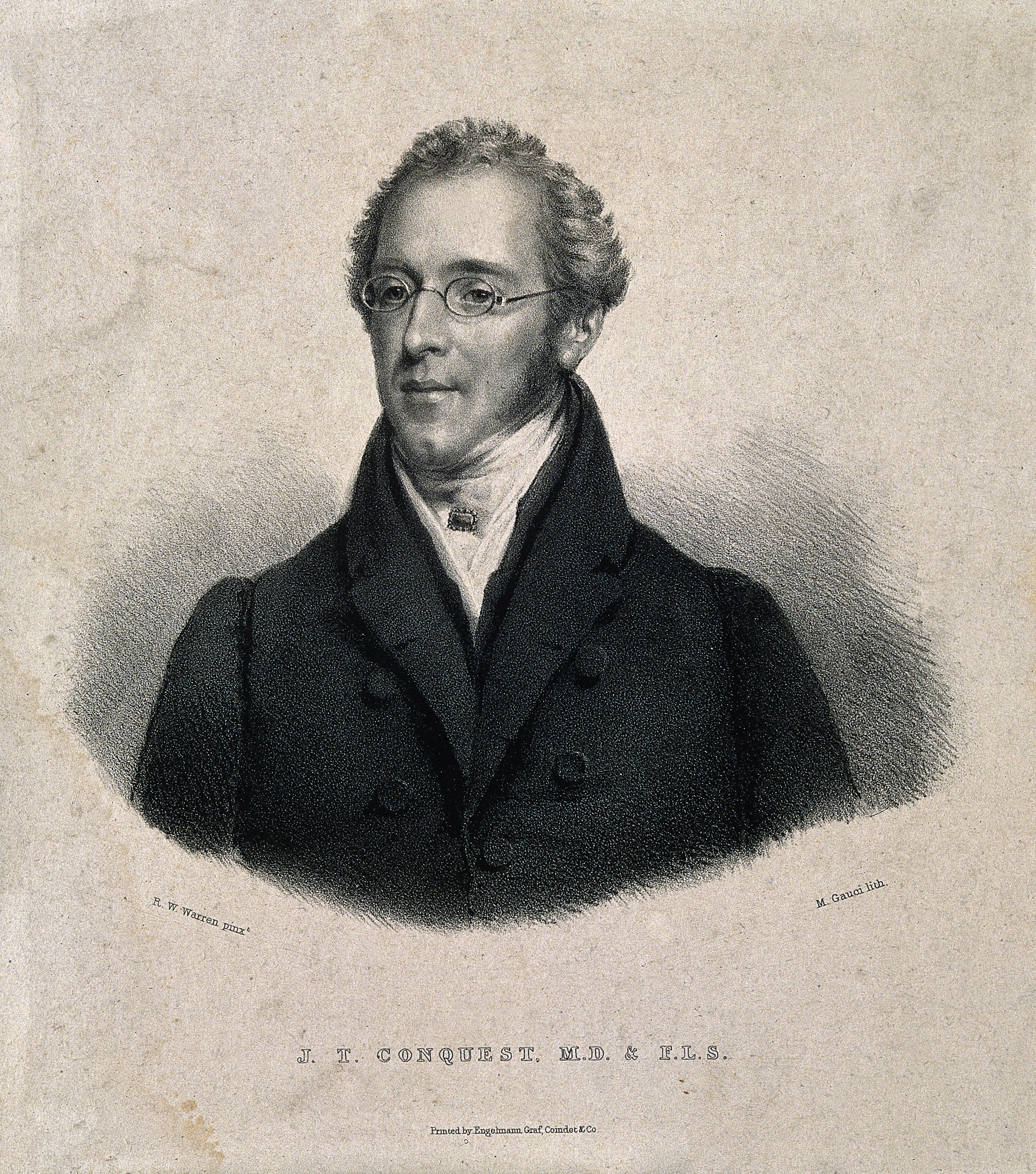

John Tricker Conquest (1789 – 24 October 1866) was a British accoucheur (male-midwife) and physician who wrote an influential textbook on midwifery Outlines of Midwifery (1820) which went into several editions and was translated into many languages and promoted in colonial India.

Conquest studied medicine at Edinburgh (MD, 1813) and was admitted Licentiate of the Royal College of Physicians (LRCP) in 1819. He worked as a midwife and later offered courses at his home in Aldemanbury Postern, charging 3 guineas a student. Still later moved to Finsbury Square and worked for a while as a midwifery lecturer at St. Bartholomew's Hospital but a conversion to homeopathy in 1834 led to his being asked to leave work. He also worked as physician at the City Lying-in hospital, London Female Penitentiary, the London Orphan Asylum, the Stoke Newington and Stamford Hill Dispensary.

Many physicians considered him indecent and his style of writing sickly and he did not become a Fellow of the Royal College of Physicians. After retirement, he died senile at his home on Shooter's Hill. Translations of his book were made into several languages including German, Urdu, Telugu, Tamil, and Kannada through Surgeon Edward Green Balfour in 1874.
