= Kincardineshire (UK Parliament constituency) =

Parliamentary constituency in the United Kingdom, 1708–1918

- Former county constituency for the House of Commons
- Subdivisions of Scotland: Kincardineshire

1708–1918
- Seats: One
- Created from: Kincardineshire
- Replaced by: Kincardine & Western Aberdeenshire

Kincardineshire was a constituency of the House of Commons of the Parliament of Great Britain from 1708 to 1801 and of the Parliament of the United Kingdom from 1801 to 1918. It was represented by one Member of Parliament (MP).

== Creation ==
The British parliamentary constituency was created in 1708 following the Acts of Union, 1707 and replaced the former Parliament of Scotland shire constituency of Kincardineshire. The first election to a Parliament of Great Britain was in 1708. In 1707-08 members of the 1702-1707 Parliament of Scotland were co-opted to serve in the 1st Parliament of Great Britain. See Scottish representatives to the 1st Parliament of Great Britain, for further details.

== Boundaries ==
The constituency represented the county of Kincardineshre., which had previously been represented by two commissioners in the former Parliament of Scotland. The constituency included the whole shire, except for the Royal burgh of Inverbervie which formed part of the Aberdeen Burghs constituency.

== History ==
The constituency elected one Member of Parliament (MP) by the first past the post system until the seat was reorganised in 1918.

In 1918, the constituency was combined with part of Western Aberdeenshire to form the Kincardine and Western Aberdeenshire constituency.

== Members of Parliament ==
- Constituency created (1708)

Year	Member	Party
1708	Sir David Ramsay, Bt	
1710	Sir Alexander Ramsay, Bt	
1713	James Scott	
1734	John Falconer	
1741	Sir James Carnegie, Bt	
1765	Sir Alexander Ramsay-Irvine, 6th Bt	
1768	Robert Hepburn	
1774	Lord Adam Gordon	
1788	Robert Barclay Allardice	
1797	Sir John Wishart-Belches	
1806	William Adam	
1812	George Harley Drummond	
1820	Sir Alexander Ramsay, Bt	
1826	Sir Hugh Arbuthnot	Tory
1834	Sir Hugh Arbuthnot	Conservative
1865	James Dyce Nicol	Liberal
1872	Sir George Balfour	Liberal
1892	John William Crombie	Liberal
1908	Arthur Murray	Liberal

- Constituency abolished (1918)

== Elections ==
Decades:	1840s; 1850s; 1860s; 1870s; 1880s; 1890s; 1900s; 1910s

=== Elections in the 1830s ===
General election 1830: Kincardineshire
Party	Candidate	Votes	%
Tory	Hugh Arbuthnot	Unopposed	
Registered electors		82	
Tory hold			

General election 1831: Kincardineshire
Party	Candidate	Votes	%
Tory	Hugh Arbuthnot	Unopposed	
Registered electors		82	
Tory hold			

General election 1832: Kincardineshire
Party	Candidate	Votes	%
Tory	Hugh Arbuthnot	388	59.1
Whig	Thomas Burnett	269	40.9
Majority		119	18.2
Turnout		657	86.1
Registered electors		763	
Tory hold			

General election 1835: Kincardineshire
Party	Candidate	Votes	%
Conservative	Hugh Arbuthnot	Unopposed	
Registered electors		844	
Conservative hold			

General election 1837: Kincardineshire
Party	Candidate	Votes	%
Conservative	Hugh Arbuthnot	Unopposed	
Registered electors		906	
Conservative hold			

=== Elections in the 1840s ===
General election 1841: Kincardineshire
Party	Candidate	Votes	%	±%
Conservative	Hugh Arbuthnot	Unopposed		
Registered electors		914		
Conservative hold				

General election 1847: Kincardineshire
Party	Candidate	Votes	%	±%
Conservative	Hugh Arbuthnot	Unopposed		
Registered electors		808		
Conservative hold				

=== Elections in the 1850s ===
General election 1852: Kincardineshire
Party	Candidate	Votes	%	±%
Conservative	Hugh Arbuthnot	Unopposed		
Registered electors		951		
Conservative hold				

General election 1857: Kincardineshire
Party	Candidate	Votes	%	±%
Conservative	Hugh Arbuthnot	Unopposed		
Registered electors		997		
Conservative hold				

General election 1859: Kincardineshire
Party	Candidate	Votes	%	±%
Conservative	Hugh Arbuthnot	Unopposed		
Registered electors		1,021		
Conservative hold				

=== Elections in the 1860s ===
General election 1865: Kincardineshire
Party	Candidate	Votes	%	±%
Liberal	James Dyce Nicol	490	63.0	New
Conservative	Thomas Gladstone	288	37.0	N/A
Majority		202	26.0	N/A
Turnout		778	78.8	N/A
Registered electors		987		
Liberal gain from Conservative		Swing	N/A	

General election 1868: Kincardineshire
Party	Candidate	Votes	%	±%
Liberal	James Dyce Nicol	Unopposed		
Registered electors		1,731		
Liberal hold				

=== Elections in the 1870s ===
Nicol's death caused a by-election.

By-election, 10 Dec 1872: Kincardineshire
Party	Candidate	Votes	%	±%
Liberal	George Balfour	Unopposed		
Liberal hold				

General election 1874: Kincardineshire
Party	Candidate	Votes	%	±%
Liberal	George Balfour	941	63.8	N/A
Conservative	James Badenach Nicolson	533	36.2	New
Majority		408	27.6	N/A
Turnout		1,474	83.4	N/A
Registered electors		1,767		
Liberal hold		Swing	N/A	

=== Elections in the 1880s ===
General election 1880: Kincardineshire
Party	Candidate	Votes	%	±%
Liberal	George Balfour	1,037	67.5	+3.7
Conservative	David Sinclair	500	32.5	−3.7
Majority		537	35.0	+7.4
Turnout		1,537	83.6	+0.2
Registered electors		1,838		
Liberal hold		Swing	+3.7	

General election 1885: Kincardineshire
Party	Candidate	Votes	%	±%
Liberal	George Balfour	3,160	71.4	+3.9
Conservative	David Scott Porteous	1,267	28.6	−3.9
Majority		1,893	42.8	+7.8
Turnout		4,427	79.3	−4.3
Registered electors		5,580		
Liberal hold		Swing	+3.9	

General election 1886: Kincardineshire
Party	Candidate	Votes	%	±%
Liberal	George Balfour	Unopposed		
Liberal hold				

=== Elections in the 1890s ===
Crombie

General election 1892: Kincardineshire
Party	Candidate	Votes	%	±%
Liberal	John William Crombie	2,444	64.0	N/A
Kincardineshire Church Defence	Johnston Stephen (Note: Some sources describe Stephen as a Liberal Unionist)	1,376	36.0	New
Majority		1,068	28.0	N/A
Turnout		3,820	66.8	N/A
Registered electors		5,719		
Liberal hold		Swing	N/A	

General election 1895: Kincardineshire
Party	Candidate	Votes	%	±%
Liberal	John William Crombie	2,603	56.1	−7.9
Conservative	Charles Hepburn-Stuart-Forbes-Trefusis	2,040	43.9	New
Majority		563	12.2	−15.8
Turnout		4,643	78.7	+11.9
Registered electors		5,897		
Liberal hold				

=== Elections in the 1900s ===
General election 1900: Kincardineshire
Party	Candidate	Votes	%	±%
Liberal	John William Crombie	3,092	66.8	+10.7
Conservative	James Mowat	1,536	33.2	−10.7
Majority		1,556	33.6	+21.4
Turnout		4,628	72.2	−6.5
Registered electors		6,410		
Liberal hold		Swing	+10.7	

General election 1906: Kincardineshire
Party	Candidate	Votes	%	±%
Liberal	John William Crombie	3,877	71.8	+5.0
Conservative	Sydney Gammell	1,524	28.2	−5.0
Majority		2,353	43.6	+10.0
Turnout		5,401	76.4	+4.2
Registered electors		7,067		
Liberal hold		Swing	+5.0	

Murray

1908 Kincardineshire by-election
Party	Candidate	Votes	%	±%
Liberal	Arthur Murray	3,661	65.1	−6.7
Conservative	Sydney Gammell	1,963	34.9	+6.7
Majority		1,698	30.2	−13.4
Turnout		5,624	79.0	+2.6
Registered electors		7,119		
Liberal hold		Swing	−6.7	

=== Elections in the 1910s ===
General election January 1910: Kincardineshire
Party	Candidate	Votes	%	±%
Liberal	Arthur Murray	3,926	67.5	+2.4
Conservative	Robert Pearson	1,891	32.5	−2.4
Majority		2,035	35.0	+4.8
Turnout		5,817	81.0	+2.0
Liberal hold		Swing	+2.4	

General election December 1910: Kincardineshire
Party	Candidate	Votes	%	±%
Liberal	Arthur Murray	Unopposed		
Liberal hold				

General Election 1914–15:

Another General Election was required to take place before the end of 1915. The political parties had been making preparations for an election to take place and by July 1914, the following candidates had been selected;

- Liberal: Arthur Murray
- Unionist: Sidney Herbert

== See also ==
- Former United Kingdom Parliament constituencies

== Notes and references ==
Notes

References

- Leigh Rayment's Historical List of MPs – Constituencies beginning with "K" (part 2)
