= 1908 Kincardineshire by-election =

UK parliamentary by-election

- 25 April 1908

Candidate	Murray	Gammell
Party	Liberal	Conservative
Popular vote	3,661	1,963
Percentage	65.1%	34.9%
MP before election
John William Crombie
Liberal
Subsequent MP
Arthur Cecil Murray
Liberal

The 1908 Kincardineshire by-election was a parliamentary by-election held for the British House of Commons constituency of Kincardineshire on 25 April 1908. The seat had become vacant when the sitting Liberal Member of Parliament John Crombie died on 22 March 1908.

The election saw the picketing of polling stations by suffragettes protesting at the Liberal government's unwillingness to bring in votes for women.

The Liberal candidate, Arthur Cecil Murray won the seat in a straight fight with his Conservative opponent Sidney James Gammell.

== Result ==
Murray

Kincardineshire by-election, 1908
Party	Candidate	Votes	%	±%
Liberal	Arthur Cecil Murray	3,661	65.1	−6.7
Conservative	Sydney Gammell	1,963	34.9	+6.7
Majority		1,698	30.2	−13.4
Turnout		5,624	79.0	+2.6
Registered electors		7,119		
Liberal hold		Swing	−6.7	

== See also ==
- List of United Kingdom by-elections (1900–1918)
