= 1872 Kincardineshire by-election =

UK Parliamentary by-election

The 1872 Kincardineshire by-election was held on 10 December 1872. The by-election was held due to the death of the incumbent Liberal MP, James Dyce Nicol. It was won by the unopposed Liberal candidate George Balfour.
