= Mure (surname) =

Mure is a surname. Notable people with the surname include:

- Benoît Jules Mure (1809—1858), French homeopath, naturalist, and anarcho-communist
- David Mure, Lord Mure (1810–1891), Scottish lawyer and politician
- Elizabeth Mure (c. 1320–c. 1355), first wife of Scottish King Robert II
- John Mure (c. 1776–1823), Canadian businessman and politician
- G. R. G. Mure (1893–1979), British philosopher and academic
- Pierre La Mure (1909–1976), French author
- Robert Mure of Caldwell (died 1620), Scottish landowner
- William Mure (disambiguation), multiple people

== See also ==
- Reginald de Mure (died 1340), Scottish noble, twice Lord Chamberlain of Scotland
- Pierre La Mure (1909–1976), French author
