= William Mure =

William Mure may refer to:

- William Mure (writer) (1594–1657)
- William Mure (1718–1776), lawyer and politician
- William Mure (scholar) (1799–1860), British Member of Parliament (MP) for Renfrewshire 1846–1855
- William Mure (1830–1880), British Member of Parliament for Renfrewshire 1874–1880
