= Jane Cecilia Deeble =

Canadian born nurse (1827 – 1913)

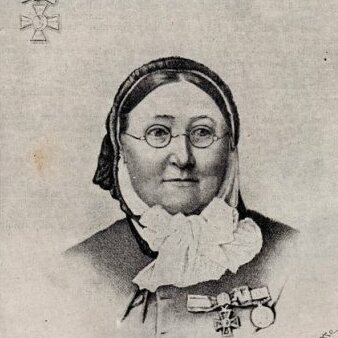
- in 1899 with medals
- Born: Jane Cecilia Egan; 1827; Halifax, Nova Scotia
- Died: 8 September 1913 (aged 85–86); Ryde
- Education: Nightingale Training School at St Thomas' Hospital
- Occupation: nurse
- Employer: Netley Hospital et al.
- Known for: awarded a Royal Red Cross
- Predecessor: Jane Catherine Shaw Stewart
- Successor: Helen Campbell Norman
- Spouse: Surgeon-Major William Deeble
- Children: four

Jane Cecilia Deeble RRC born Jane Cecilia Egan (1827 – 8 September 1913) was a Canadian-born nurse who was awarded the second Royal Red Cross by Queen Victoria in 1883. The Royal Red Cross was created following Deeble's comment that nurses were not recognised officially. She served in South Africa and at Netley Hospital.

== Life ==
Deeble was born in Halifax, Nova Scotia. Her parents were Eleanor Ellen Egan (born Leffler) and Stephen Egan who was an officer. She was brought up in Canada and later in Bermuda. She married a young military surgeon named William Deeble. Her husband would serve in Crimea and in India. They had four children while they were in India before they returned to Britain at the end of 1865. She and their four children were living in Glasgow in 1868 when news of her husband's death would have reached them. He died from dysentery while serving in the British Abyssinian campaign. He died in April and in July she was given a pension of £140 per annum. She decided that she wanted to be a nurse and her ambition was to lead the nurses at Netley Hospital.

She was trained at the Nightingale Training School at St Thomas' Hospital after the War Office interfered with the recruitment process which attracted the censure of Florence Nightingale.

In 1863 Crimean veteran Jane Shaw Stewart became the first Supervisor of Nurses at Netley Hospital and the first woman ever to appear on a British Army List. In 1866 she was obliged to stand down after an investigation revealed her bullying, attacks and temper. She was succeeded by Deeble at Netley Hospital in 1869. Deeble was credited with "repairing the damage" caused by Stewart.

In 1879 the Anglo-Zulu War started and Deeble was able to achieve her ambition of taking part in a military campaign. She and six nurses went to South Africa and most of them were based at Addington near Durban. She was used by the National Society for Aid to the Sick and Wounded in War before it became the British Red Cross to distribute aid locally. She was keen on this organisation and on the role she had of training nurses for services abroad. She was asked to return to Natal but she preferred to serve at Netley.

In 1883 the Secretary of State for War created a committee to look at the work of the Army Hospital Corps and field hospital management and nursing. Deeble was asked to give evidence and as an aside she noted that there was no official recognition of the work done by military nurses. The message was passed to one of Queen Victoria's courtiers and in April 1883 the Royal Red Cross award was created. The first award went to Florence Nightingale and the second was given by the Queen to Deeble in May or July.

== Death and legacy ==
Deeble died on the Isle of Wight at Ryde in 1913. She and her son William, four years later, were buried in an unmarked grave in Ryde. Her medals were offered for auction in January 2024 with an estimate of about £2,500.
