= 1869 Renfrewshire by-election =

UK parliamentary by-election

The 1869 Renfrewshire by-election was fought on 25 January 1869. The by-election was fought due to the death of the incumbent Liberal MP Archibald Alexander Speirs. It was won by the unopposed Liberal candidate Henry Bruce.
