= Shaw-Stewart baronets =

Baronetcy in the Baronetage of Nova Scotia

The Stewart, later Shaw-Stewart Baronetcy, of Greenock and Blackhall in the County of Renfrew, is a title in the Baronetage of Nova Scotia. It was created on 27 March 1667 for Archibald Stewart. In Scotland, the name is styled Shaw Stewart. This family is descended in the direct male line from Sir John Stewart, illegitimate son of Robert III of Scotland, who granted him the estate of Ardgowan in Renfrewshire. The third Baronet married Helen, sister and co-heir of Sir John Houston of that Ilk, 4th Baronet, and his wife Margaret, daughter of Sir John Shaw, of Greenock, 2nd Baronet (see Shaw baronets, of Greenock). The fourth Baronet succeeded to the Greenock estates on the death of his great-uncle Sir John Shaw of Greenock, 3rd and last Baronet, in 1752 and assumed the additional surname of Shaw. He later sat as Member of Parliament for Renfrewshire from 1780 to 1783 and from 1786 to 1796 (see also Barony of Blackhall).

The fifth Baronet served as Lord Lieutenant of Renfrewshire between 1822 and 1825. The sixth Baronet represented Lanarkshire in Parliament from 1827 to 1830 and Renfrewshire from 1830 to 1837. The seventh Baronet was Member of Parliament for Renfrewshire from 1855 to 1865 and Lord-Lieutenant of Renfrewshire between 1869 and 1903. The eighth Baronet represented Renfrewshire East in the House of Commons from 1886 to 1906 and was Lord-Lieutenant of Renfrewshire from 1922 to 1942. The ninth Baronet served as Lord-Lieutenant of Renfrewshire from 1950 to 1967. As of 2014 the title is held by his grandson, the twelfth Baronet.

Lucinda, Lady Shaw Stewart, widow of the eleventh Baronet, has been Trustee of the Royal Collection Trust since 2005.

Other notable family members include John Shaw Stewart FRSE (1793–1840) Sheriff of Stirlingshire, and Major General John Heron Maxwell Shaw-Stewart FRSE FRGS (1831–1908), a military engineer in India and nephew of the 6th baronet.

The family seat is still Ardgowan House, near Inverkip, Renfrewshire.

== Stewart, later Shaw-Stewart baronets, of Greenock and Blackhall (1667) ==
- Sir Archibald Stewart, 1st Baronet (c. 1635 – c. 1722)
- Sir Archibald Stewart, 2nd Baronet (died 1724)
- Sir Michael Stewart, 3rd Baronet (c. 1712–1796)
- Sir John Shaw Stewart, 4th Baronet (c. 1740–1812)
- Sir Michael Shaw Stewart, 5th Baronet (10 February 1766 – 1825)
- Sir Michael Shaw-Stewart, 6th Baronet (1788–1836)
- Sir Michael Robert Shaw-Stewart, 7th Baronet (1826–1903)
- Sir Michael Hugh Shaw-Stewart, 8th Baronet (1854–1942)
- Sir Walter Guy Shaw-Stewart, 9th Baronet (1892–1976)
- Sir Euan Guy Shaw-Stewart, 10th Baronet (1928–1980)
- Sir Houston Mark Shaw-Stewart, 11th Baronet (1931–2004)
- Sir Ludovic Houston Shaw-Stewart, 12th Baronet (born 1986)
