= James Goold =

James Goold may refer to:

- James Alipius Goold (1812–1886), first Archbishop of Melbourne
- James Goold, Baron Goold (1923–1997), Scottish Conservative politician and accountant
