= Helen Campbell Norman =

British Military nurse (1856–1913)

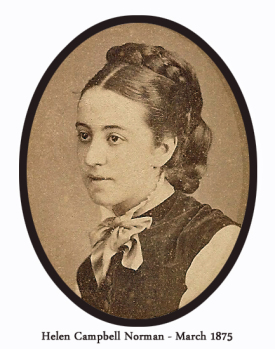
- Norman in 1875
- Born: 27 January 1856; Peshawar, British Raj
- Died: 31 July 1913 (aged 57); Brisbane, Queensland, Australia
- Relatives: Field Marshal Sir Henry Wylie Norman (father)
- Military career
- Allegiance: United Kingdom
- Branch: Army Nursing Service
- Service years: 1883–1910
- Rank: Matron-in-Chief
- Commands: Queen Alexandra's Imperial Military Nursing Service (1906–10)
- Conflicts: Anglo-Egyptian War
- Awards: Royal Red Cross

Helen Campbell Norman, RRC (27 January 1856 – 31 July 1913) was a leading British military nurse who was awarded the Royal Red Cross for her role in the Anglo-Egyptian War. She was later in charge of nursing at Netley Hospital in Southampton.

== Nursing career ==
Norman was born in Peshawar in the British Raj on 27 January 1856. She was the second daughter of Selina Eliza Davidson and Lieutenant (later Field Marshal Sir) Henry Wylie Norman. She trained to be a nurse in Paddington at St Mary's Hospital under the supervision of Rachel Williams, who was a close friend of Florence Nightingale.

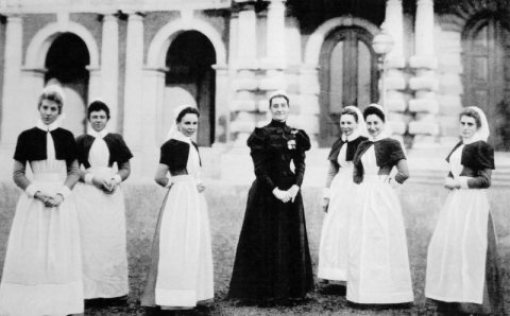
Norman wearing her medals and with her nurses in 1897

In 1882 Britain sent soldiers to Egypt as part of the Anglo-Egyptian War. Assets were under threat including the Suez Canal. Norman was the first British nurse to arrive in Egypt when she was sent to Ismailia. When she returned she was decorated with the fifteenth Royal Red Cross in May 1883 and later that year she joined the Army Nursing Service.

In October 1889 Norman succeeded as the Superintendent at the Netley Hospital, taking over from Jane Cecilia Deeble. Nurse Caulfield had been offered the job but she refused so Norman was the next choice. Norman served at that military hospital in Southampton until 1902.

In 1906 Norman became matron-in-chief of Queen Alexandra's Imperial Military Nursing Service and she held that position until 1910. Norman died in Brisbane, Australia, on 31 July 1913, aged 57.
