= 1873 Renfrewshire by-election =

UK Parliamentary by-election

The 1873 Renfrewshire by-election was held on 10 September 1873. The by-election was held due to the elevation to a peerage of the incumbent MP of the Liberal Party, Henry Bruce. It was won by the Conservative candidate Archibald Campbell.
