= Jane Catherine Shaw Stewart =

British nurse (1821 – 1905)

- Born: 22 September 1821; Marylebone
- Died: 14 March 1905 (aged 83); Slinfold
- Occupation: nurse supervisor
- Employer: British Army
- Known for: leading nurse in Crimea
- Parent(s): Sir Michael Shaw-Stewart, 6th Baronet; Eliza Mary Farquhar
- Relatives: Sir Michael Shaw-Stewart, 7th Baronet (brother)

Jane Catherine Shaw Stewart (22 September 1821 – 14 March 1905) was a leading British nurse in Crimea. At one point she was designated to take over from Florence Nightingale. She was the first woman to appear on a British Army List. She had to stand down from her leading position after an investigation revealed her bullying.

== Life ==
Stewart was born in the Marylebone area of London in 1821. She was the first of six children born to Eliza Mary (born Farquhar) and Sir Michael Shaw-Stewart, 6th Baronet. Her parents owned slaves in Trinidad and Tobago as well as estates in Renfrewshire in Scotland. When her mother died in 1853, she used her inheritance (from slave owning) to construct St Mary's, a new Episcopalian church in Port Glasgow.

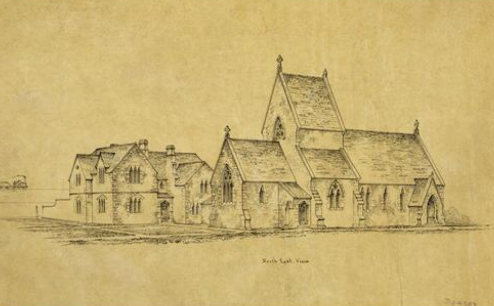
The Church she had built in Port Glasgow (now demolished)

She met Florence Nightingale in 1854 and resolved to work in Crimea. However, she lacked experience, so she went to work at Guy's and Westminster Hospitals before she left with Mary Stanley for Crimea. She arrived in a group of new nurses who were mostly Catholic and there was bad feeling. Nightingale felt that there was no need for more nurses and Stanley's arrival undermined her pre-eminence. Nightingale and Stanley's friendship suffered but Nightingale soon promoted Stewart.

In 1856 Florence Nightingale believed she would soon die so she told her supporter General Storks that if she did, then Stewart should take over her duties. Later she wrote of Stewart in glowing terms. She felt that their work in Crimea would not have been achieved without Stewart. She knew that she could be "mad", but she was truthful and faithful despite the "petty persecutions" laid in their way. For fifteen months she led the General, Castle and Left-Wing hospitals as Superintendent.

Florence continued to support her by asking that Stewart might receive more training and identifying her as the person to lead the army nurses.

In 1863 Stewart became the Supervisor of Nurses at Netley Hospital and the first woman to ever appear on a British Army List. The Royal Herbert Hospital opened in 1865 and in the following year, Stewart, became responsible for their nurses until she was obliged to stand down after accusations of bullying. An investigation revealed her bullying, attacks and temper. She was succeeded by Jane Cecilia Deeble at Netley Hospital in 1869. She was creditted with "repairing the damage" caused by her predecessor.

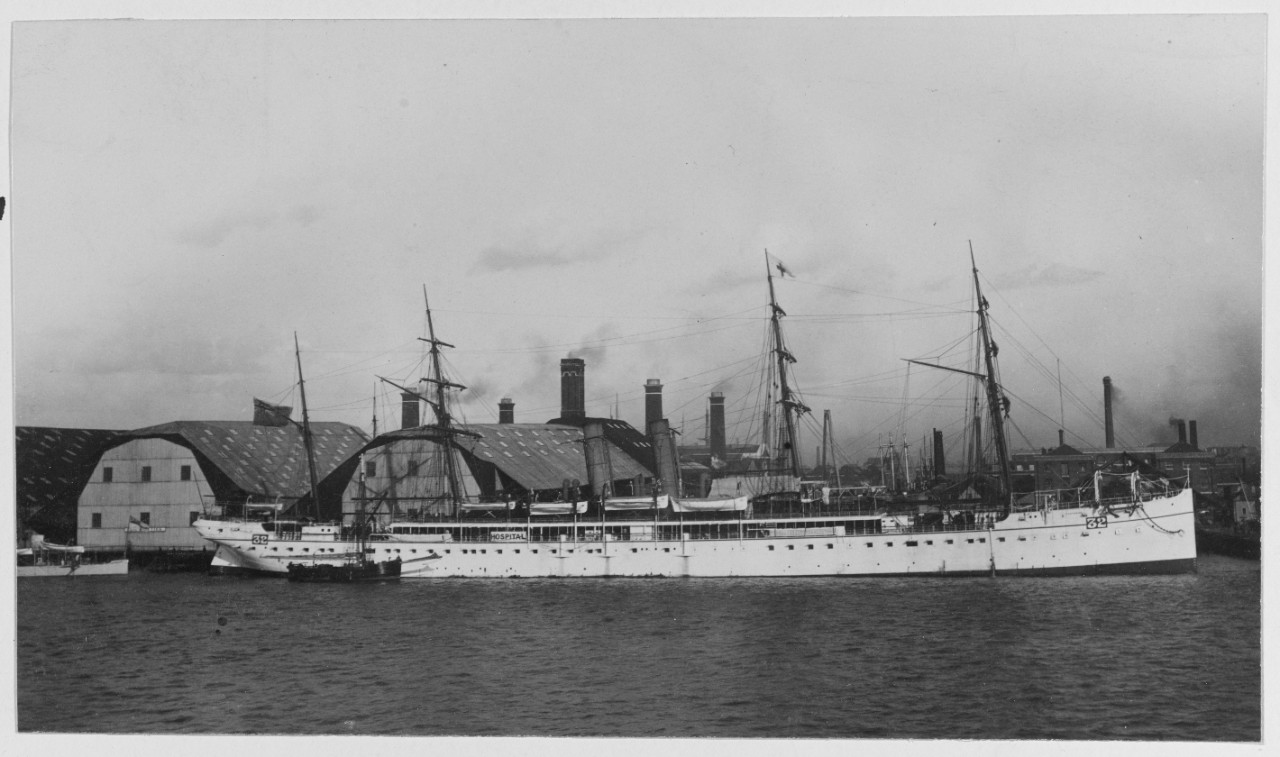
HMS CARTHAGE (British Hospital Ship) Photographed about 1880

Stewart was later employed as the sister-in-charge of the British hospital ship Carthage during the Anglo-Egyptian War in 1882.

== Death and legacy ==
Stewart died in Slinfold in 1905. The Episcopalian St Mary's church that she had created in Port Glasgow was demolished in 1970 to make way for a road. A new church was built, and this includes some of the stained glass that she had paid for.
