= Cameron Parker =

Scottish businessman

Cameron Holdsworth Parker CVO OBE (born 14 April 1932) is a former Scottish businessman and a former Lord Lieutenant of Renfrewshire. Parker has been chairman and served on the board of engineering companies, including British Shipbuilders and was a Liveryman of the Worshipful Company of Shipwrights in the 1980s.

Honorary titles
Preceded by The Lord Goold	Lord Lieutenant of Renfrewshire; 1998-2007	Succeeded by Guy Clark
