= William Mure (scholar) =

Scottish scholar and politician (1799–1860)

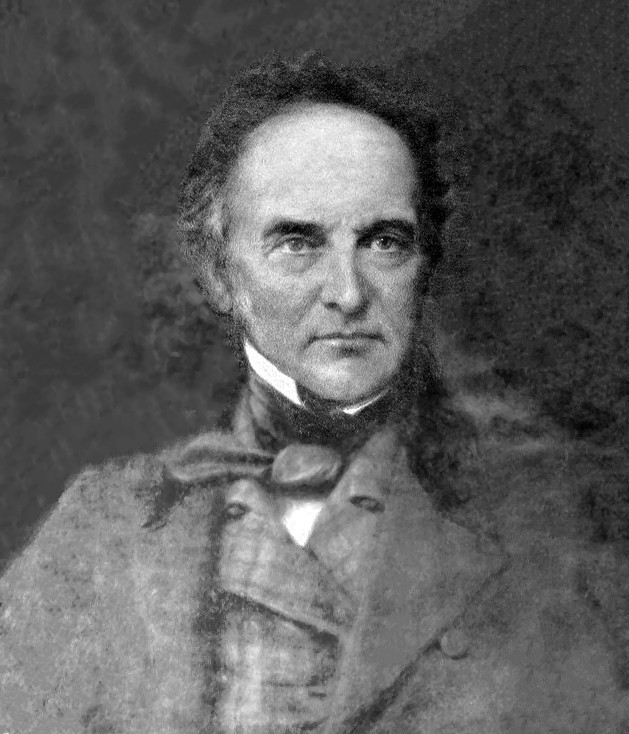

Member of Parliament for Renfrewshire
- In office 1846–1855
- Preceded by: Patrick Maxwell Stewart
- Succeeded by: Sir Michael Shaw-Stewart, Bt.

Rector of the University of Glasgow
- In office 1847–1848
- Preceded by: Lord John Russell
- Succeeded by: Thomas Babington Macaulay

Personal details
- Born: 10 July 1799 Caldwell, Ayrshire
- Died: 1 April 1860 (aged 60) London
- Party: Conservative
- Spouse: Laura Markham (m. 1825)
- Relations: William Mure (grandfather); James Hunter Blair (grandfather); Thomas Lister (grandson)
- Children: 6, including William, Charles, Emma
- Parent(s): William Mure; Anne Blair
- Education: Westminster School
- Alma mater: University of Edinburgh; University of Bonn

William Mure (10 July 1799 – 1 April 1860) was a Scottish scholar and Conservative politician. He sat in the Parliament of the United Kingdom from 1846 to 1855 as the Member of Parliament (MP) for Renfrewshire and was Laird of Caldwell in Ayrshire.

== Early life ==
William Mure was born on 10 July 1799 at Caldwell House, near Ayrshire. He was the eldest son of William Mure of Caldwell (d. 1831), colonel of the Renfrew militia, and Lord Rector of Glasgow University from 1793 to 1794, and Anne Blair Mure (d. 1854). She was the eldest daughter of Sir James Hunter Blair, 1st Baronet (1741–1787) of Dunskey, Wigtownshire. His paternal grandfather was William Mure (1718–1776), Baron of the Exchequer, and a descendant of the Mures of Rowallan. His younger brother was M.P. and judge David Mure, Lord Mure (1810–1891).

He was educated at Westminster School, at the University of Edinburgh, and afterwards in Germany at the University of Bonn.

=== Succession ===
Mure succeeded to the Caldwell estates on his father's death, 9 February 1831.

== Career ==
When he was about twenty-two he contributed to the Edinburgh Review an article on Spanish literature. His first independent publication was Brief Remarks on the Chronology of the Egyptian Dynasties (against Champollion), issued in 1829; (London, 8vo). It was followed in 1832 by A Dissertation on the Calendar and Zodiac of Ancient Egypt (Edinburgh, 8vo).

In 1838, Mure began a tour in Greece, leaving Ancona for Corfu on 17 February. He studied the 'topography of Ithaca, and visited Acarnania, Delphi, Boeotia, Attica, and the Peloponnese. He published an interesting Journal of a Tour in Greece and the Ionian Islands in 1842 (Edinburgh, 8vo). His principal work, A Critical History of the Language and Literature of Antient Greece, was issued 1850–7, London, 8vo; 2nd edit. 1859, 8vo; it consists of five volumes, but deals only with a part of the subject, viz. the early history of writing, Homer, Hesiod, the early lyric poets and historians Herodotus, Thucydides, and Xenophon. It contains no account of the dramatists, orators, or any literature subsequent to 380 B.C. Mure also published The Commercial Policy of Pitt and Peel, 1847, 8vo; Selections from the Family Papers [of the Mures] preserved at Caldwell,Maitland Club, 1854, 8vo; Remarks on the Appendices to the second vol. 3rd edit, of Mr. Grote's History of Greece, London, 1851, 8vo; and National Criticism in 1858 (on a criticism of Mure's 'History of the Literature of Greece'), London, 1858, 8vo.

=== Political career ===
He was M.P. for Renfrewshire from 1846 to 1855 in the conservative interest, but seldom spoke in the house. He was created D.C.L. by Oxford University on 9 June 1833. He was a man of commanding presence, winning manners, and kindly disposition. He was, like his father, for many years colonel of the Renfrewshire militia, and, like his father and grandfather, was Lord Rector of Glasgow University from 1847 to 1848.

== Personal life ==
On 7 February 1825, Mure married Laura Markham, the second daughter of William Markham of Becca Hall, Yorkshire, and granddaughter of William Markham (1719–1807) the Archbishop of York from 1776 to 1807, and had issue three sons and three daughters.

- William Mure (1830–1880), who was Lieutenant-Colonel in the Scots Fusilier Guards, M.P. for Renfrewshire from 1874 to 1880.
- Charles Reginald Mure, who became an officer in the 43rd light infantry.
- Emma Mure (1833–1911), who married Thomas Lister, 3rd Baron Ribblesdale (1828–1876)

He died at Kensington Park Gardens, London, on 1 April 1860, aged 60. Mure is buried in the parish church of Neilston.

Parliament of the United Kingdom
| Preceded by Patrick Maxwell Stewart | Member of Parliament for Renfrewshire; 1846–1855 | Succeeded by Sir Michael Shaw-Stewart, Bt. |
Academic offices
| Preceded by Lord John Russell | Rector of the University of Glasgow; 1847—1848 | Succeeded by Thomas Babington Macaulay |
