= David Mure, Lord Mure =

Scottish lawyer and Conservative Party politician

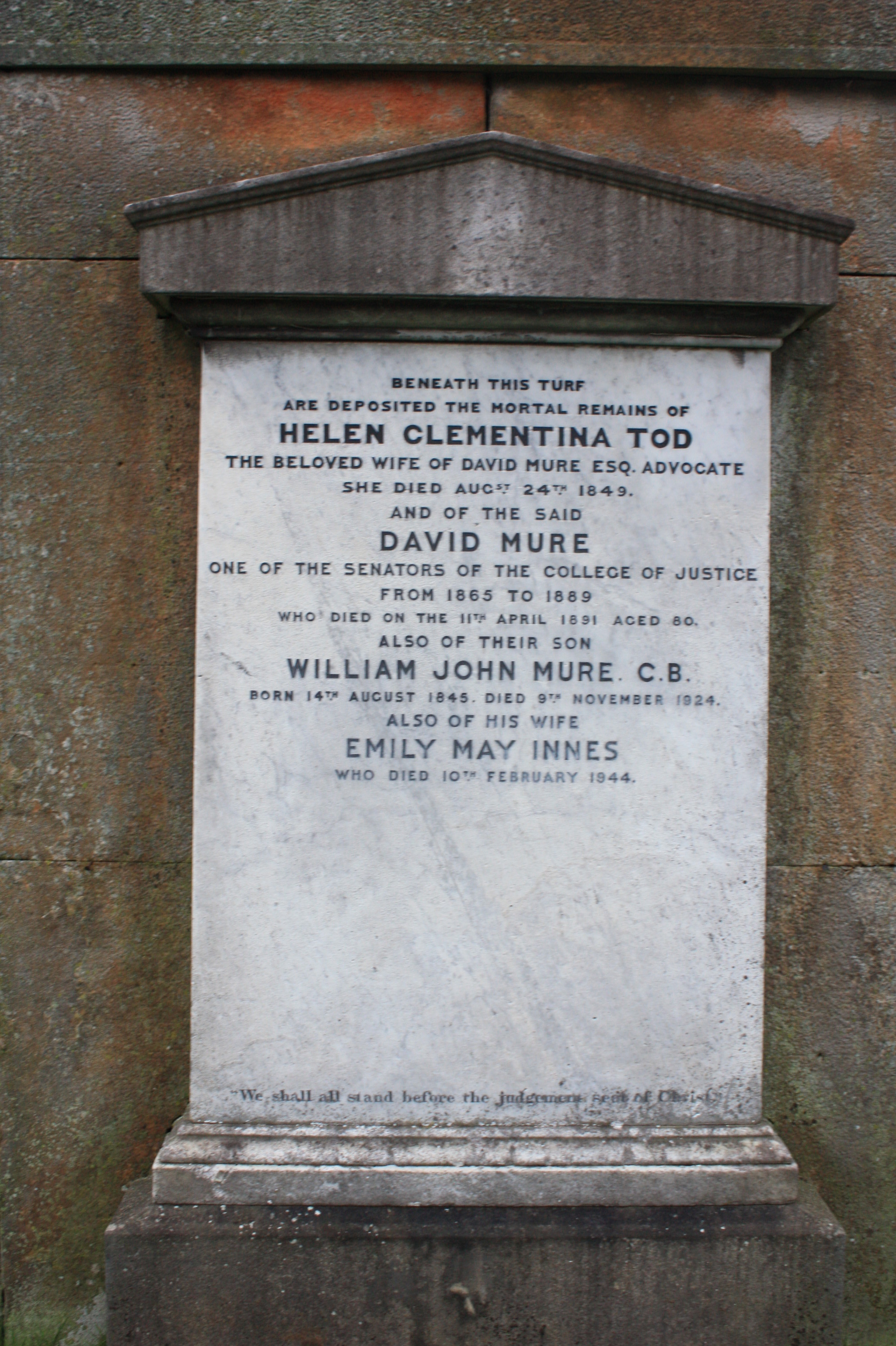
The grave of David Mure, Dean Cemetery

David Mure (11 October 1810 – 11 April 1891) was a Scottish lawyer and Conservative Party politician. He sat in the House of Commons from 1859 to 1865, when he became a judge.

== Early life ==
He was the third son of William Mure of Caldwell, Rector of the University of Glasgow 1793–1795; grandson of William Mure, MP for Renfrewshire 1742-1761 and Rector of Glasgow 1764–1765; younger brother of William Mure, MP for Renfrewshire 1846-1855 and Rector of Glasgow 1847–1848, and uncle of William Mure, MP for Renfrewshire 1874–1880.

== Career ==
He was appointed Solicitor General for Scotland in 1858 and Lord Advocate in 1859. He elected at the 1859 general election as the member of parliament (MP) for Buteshire, and held the seat until January 1865, when he was appointed as a Senator of the College of Justice and with the judicial title Lord Mure.

== Personal life ==
He was married to Helen Clementina Tod (d.1849) and together they had William John Mure (1845–1924). They lived at 8 Albyn Place on the Moray Estate near Charlotte Square.

He died on 11 April 1891 and is buried in Dean Cemetery in western Edinburgh with his wife and son. The grave lies in the north-west corner of the original cemetery, backing onto the first north extension.

== Arms ==
Coat of arms of David Mure, Lord Mure

Crest
A Saracen's head Proper.
Escutcheon
Argent on a fess Azure three stars of the first within a bordure engrailed Gules.
Motto
Duris Non Frangor

== Sources ==
- http://www.electricscotland.com/history/nation/mure.htm

Parliament of the United Kingdom
Preceded by James Stuart-Wortley	Member of Parliament for Buteshire; 1859 – 1865	Succeeded by George Boyle
