= James Grahame, Lord Easdale =

Scottish lawyer, landowner and Senator of the College of Justice

James Grahame, Lord Easdale also known as James Grahame of Kilmannan (1696–1750) was a Scottish lawyer, landowner and Senator of the College of Justice.

== Life ==
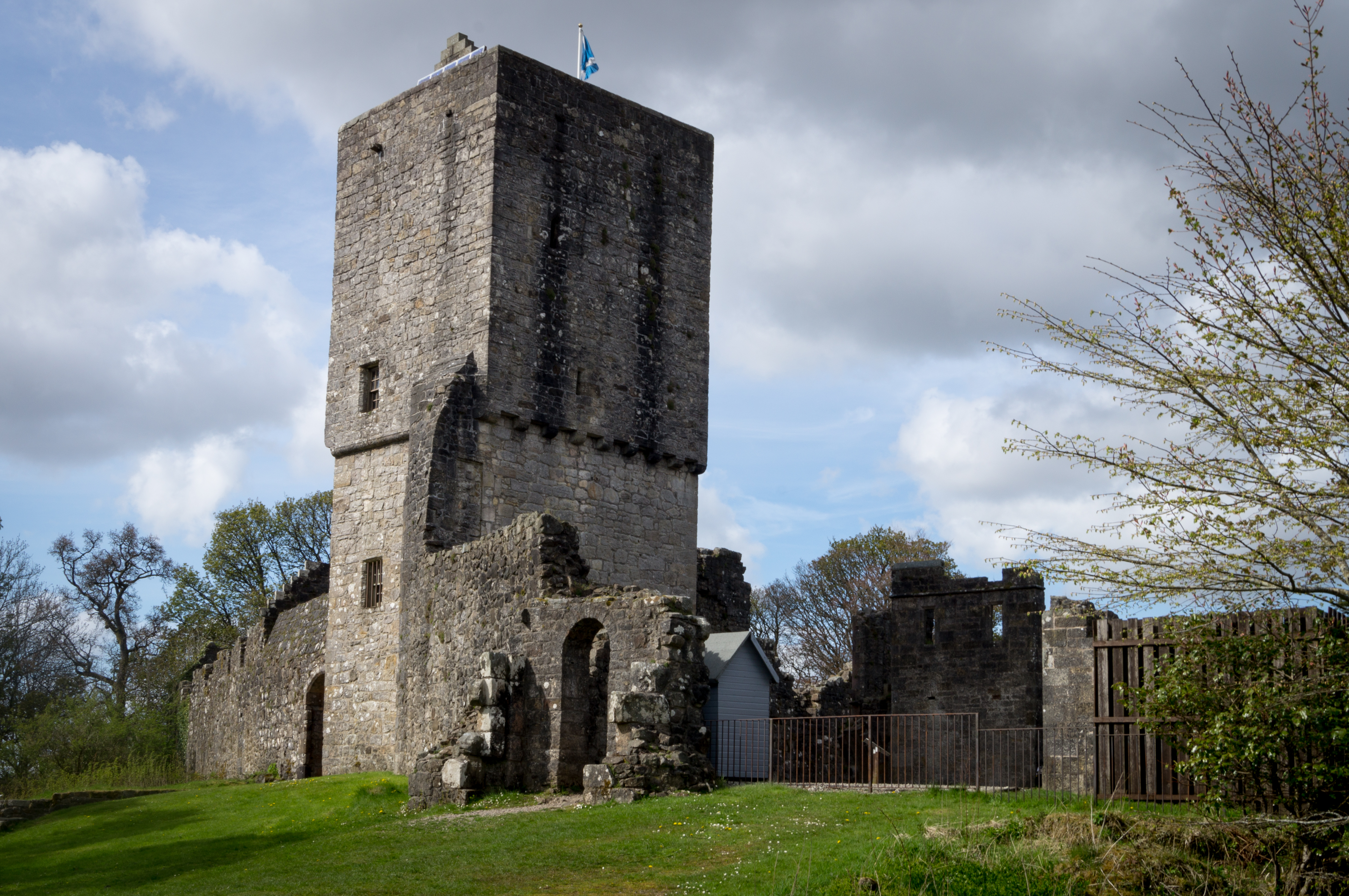
Mugdock Castle

He was born in March 1696 the son of John Grahame (b.1669), 3rd Laird of Dougalston (just north of Glasgow near Milngavie) and his wife, Margaret Nisbet. James was baptised in Glasgow on 26 March 1696. The Dougalston estate had the 14th century Mugdock Castle at its heart, and James was raised here. This huge sprawling fortress is now largely ruinous but its imposing main tower survives.

In October 1719 he enrolled as a burgess and guild brother in Glasgow. He trained as a lawyer passing the Scottish bar as an advocate in February 1723. He was then known as James Grahame of Kilmannan (an estate west of Dougalston).

On 3 June 1749 he was elected a Senator of the College of Justice adopting the title Lord Easdale, in place of the late Robert Dundas, Lord Arniston. Grahame's connection to the island of Easdale is unclear.

He died on 15 August 1750. His position as Senator was filled by George Sinclair, Lord Woodhall.

== Family ==
His daughter, Katherine Grahame, married William Mure (1718-1776). His second daughter, Lilias, died in 1749.
