= Archibald Alexander Speirs =

Scottish politician

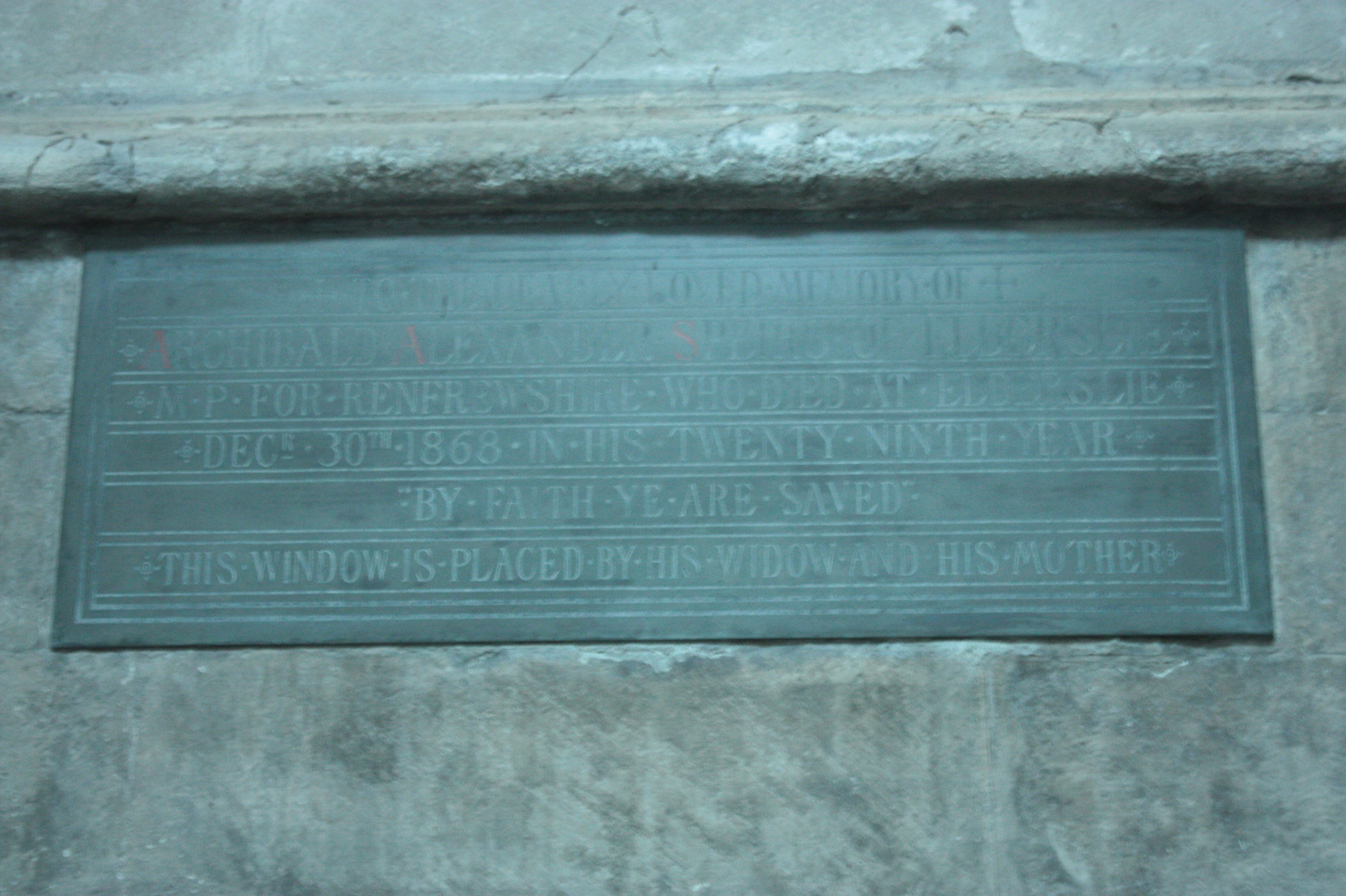
Memorial to Archibald Alexander Speirs, Paisley Abbey

Archibald Alexander Speirs (5 June 1840 – 30 December 1868) was a Scottish Liberal politician who sat in the House of Commons from 1865 to 1868.

== Life ==
Speirs was the son of Alexander Speirs of Elderslie House, and his wife Eliza Stewart Hagart, daughter of Thomas C. Hagart of Bantaskine. His father was Lord-Lieutenant of the county and M.P. for Richmond.

At the 1865 general election Speirs was elected member of parliament for Renfrewshire. He held the seat until his death aged 28 in 1868.

Speirs married Anne Pleydell-Bouverie, daughter of Jacob Bouverie, 4th Earl of Radnor, on 3 September 1867. They lived at Elderslie, Renfrewshire, Scotland.

He was an elder in Paisley Abbey and a memorial plaque to his memory was erected on the south aisle after his death.

Parliament of the United Kingdom
Preceded by Sir Michael Shaw-Stewart, Bt	Member of Parliament for Renfrewshire; 1865–1868	Succeeded by Henry Bruce
