= George Houstoun =

George Houston (31 July 1810 – 14 September 1843) was a Scottish politician.

Houston lived at Johnstone Castle. He stood at the 1835 UK general election in Renfrewshire for the Conservative Party, but was not elected. He next stood in the 1837 Renfrewshire by-election, at which he easily won the seat, and he held it at the 1837 UK general election. In Parliament, he supported Protestant supremacy. He stood down at the 1841 UK general election.
