= George Sinclair, Lord Woodhall =

Scottish judge and Senator of the College of Justice (c.1700–1764)

George Sinclair, Lord Woodhall also known as George Sinclair of Castlehill (c.1700–1764) was a Scottish judge and Senator of the College of Justice.

== Life ==
He was the son of Sir John Sinclair, 4th Baronet of Longformacus, an estate in East Lothian, east of Edinburgh, and his wife and cousin, Martha Lockhart-Sinclair. He trained in law and became an advocate around 1725, later also serving as Sheriff of Lanark from 1747. His ancestor was one of the many Scottish landowners who purchased a Nova Scotia baronetcy in 1624 as part of a state exercise to raise funds in exchange for titles.

On the death of George's grandfather in 1727, his father became a baronet.

He had a home and legal practise on Castlehill in Edinburgh at the top of the Royal Mile close to Scotland's main law courts.

In February 1751 he was elected a Senator of the College of Justice in place of the late James Grahame, Lord Easdale.

At some point in the mid-18th century he rented Woodhall House south-west of Edinburgh. Through his mother he inherited the huge estates of Lockhart (now the modern area known as Craiglockhart), this included the 15th century Craiglockhart Castle.

In 1761 he inherited the estate of Murkle on the north Scottish coast from his cousin and friend Alexander Sinclair, 9th Earl of Caithness. George Sinclair died on 5 May 1764. He died immensely rich, but unmarried and childless. His father died after him, preventing his ever being a baronet. The baronetcy passed briefly to his paternal uncle, Henry Sinclair (d.1768). In 1766 after a contest to both George's and Alexander's will, the estates passed to a nephew, Sir John Sinclair of Stevenson (d.1789). His position as Senator was filled by Francis Garden, Lord Gardenstone.

The Lockhart estates passed to a nephew, Captain James Lockhart of Castlehill (1736-1808) in 1764 and the same nephew became the baronet in 1768 when Henry Sinclair died.
