= Navy Directory =

Official list of naval officers

A Navy Directory, Navy List or Naval Register is an official list of naval officers, their ranks and seniority, the ships which they command or to which they are appointed, etc., that is published by the government or naval authorities of a country.

== Background ==
A Navy List fulfills an important function in international law in that warships are required by article 29 of the United Nations Convention on the Law of the Sea to be commanded by a commissioned officer whose name appears in the appropriate service list. Past copies of the Navy List are also important sources of information for historians and genealogists. When a ship is removed from the navy list of any country, the ship is said to be "stricken" (from the list).

The British Royal Navy publishes annual lists of active and reserve officers, and biennial lists of retired officers. In 2016 The Navy List, which had been officially published under that name since 1814, was renamed The Navy Directory. The equivalent in the United States Navy is the Naval Vessel Register, which is updated online on a continuous basis.

== See also ==
- Army List
- Naval Vessel Register
