= John Shaw Stewart =

Scottish advocate and writer (1793–1840)

John Shaw Stewart FRSE (1793–1840) was a 19th-century Scottish advocate and essayist.

== Life ==
He was born John Shaw Shaw-Stewart on 24 July 1793 a younger son of Sir Michael Shaw-Stewart (1766-1825) 5th Baronet of Greenock and Blackhall, and his wife, the Hon. Catherine Maxwell, daughter of Sir William Maxwell of Springkell. His brothers included Admiral Sir Houston Shaw Stewart (1791-1875).

He studied Law and qualified as an advocate in 1816. He was Advocate Depute from 1830 to 1835 and he served as Sheriff of Stirlingshire from 1838.

In 1823, he was elected a Fellow of the Royal Society of Edinburgh, his proposer being William Miller, Lord Glenlee. He was also a member of the Speculative Society of Edinburgh.

He lived at 12 Shandwick Place in Edinburgh's West End, close to Princes Street.

He died in Edinburgh on 29 June 1840 and is buried with members of his family in St Cuthbert's Churchyard at the west end of Princes Street Gardens.

== Family ==
He married his cousin, Jane Stuart Heron-Maxwell (1806-1886), in 1827. They had two daughters and two sons, including:

- Major General John Heron Maxwell Shaw-Stewart (1832–1908), Royal Engineers.
- Catharine Maxwell Shaw Stewart (died 1 April 1900).

== Publications ==
- The Art of Printing
- Agriculture
- The Study of Political Philosophy
