= Alexander Crum =

Scottish printer and Liberal Party politician

Alexander Crum (1828 – 23 August 1893) was a Scottish printer and Liberal Party politician who sat in the House of Commons from 1880 to 1885.

Crum was the eldest son of Walter Crum FRS of Thornliebank and his wife Jesse Graham, daughter of William Graham of Burntshiel, Renfrewshire. The Crum family were associated with the printworks which had been founded in Thornliebank in 1778. Crum's father Walter Crum was a chemist and businessman, who replaced the spinning and weaving business by calico printing. Crum ran the printworks, which was the main employment in the village, and he was also a major benefactor supporting housing, education, and leisure facilities in the village. He also provided funds for the village club and Thornliebank Parish Church. He was also a J.P. and deputy lieutenant of Renfrewshire.

Crum was elected unopposed as the Member of Parliament (MP) for Renfrewshire at a by-election in November 1880. He held the seat until the constituency was divided at the 1885 general election, when he did not stand again.

In 1863 Crum married Margaret Nina, daughter of the Rt. Rev. Alexander Ewing, Bishop of Argyll. Their son was the Coptologist Walter Ewing Crum.

He died at the age of 65 and was commemorated by the library in Thornliebank, opened in 1897.

Parliament of the United Kingdom
Preceded by William Mure	Member of Parliament for Renfrewshire; 1880 – 1885	Constituency divided
