= Sir Michael Shaw-Stewart, 6th Baronet =

Scottish politician

Michael Shaw-Stewart

Personal details
- Born: 4 October 1788
- Died: 19 December 1836 (aged 48)
- Spouse: Eliza Farquhar (m. 1819)
- Children: 8, including Michael
- Parent: Michael Stewart (father)
- Relatives: Hugh Shaw-Stewart (grandson)
- Education: Christ Church, Oxford

Sir Michael Shaw-Stewart, 6th Baronet (4 October 1788 – 19 December 1836) was a Scottish politician, Member of Parliament for Lanarkshire 1827–1830 and Renfrewshire 1830–1836.

== Biography ==
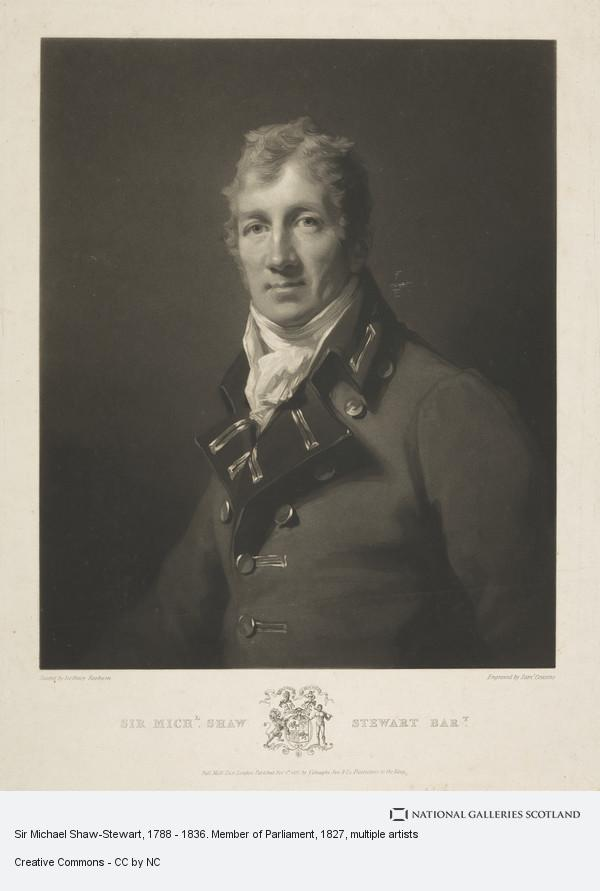
Shaw-Stewart's father wearing his hunting jacket from the Royal Caledonian Hunt

He was the son of Sir Michael Shaw Stewart, 5th Baronet 1766–1825 and the father of Sir Michael Shaw-Stewart, 7th Baronet 1826–1903. The family had lands in Renfrewshire and they owned slaves in Trinidad and Tobago. He was educated at Christ Church, Oxford, where he befriended Robert Peel, becoming a lifelong political supporter of his.

Whilst the Ardgowan House estate has been owned by the Stewart family since the 15th century, the present house dates from 1797 and remains the seat of the Shaw Stewarts, whose baronetcy of Nova Scotia was conferred by King Charles II on Archibald Stewart of Blackhall in 1667.

Michael Shaw Stewart, who, like so many young gentlemen at the time, took advantage of France's defeat in 1814 to visit the continent. The Treaty of Fontainebleau signed on 11 April 1814 marked the immediate abdication of Napoleon and the end of the embargo on British goods known as the Continental Blockade, suddenly making it much more congenial for the British to visit Europe once more, resurrecting the tradition of The Grand Tour.

Interrupting his career in politics, Shaw Stewart, then aged 27, seized the opportunity to embark on his Grand Tour without hesitation. He carefully recorded his adventures in a diary which, initially intended for his parents, provides contemporary readers with an exceptional insight in the state of Europe so soon after the first defeat of Napoleon. Shaw Stewart travelled to Germany and the Low Countries, France and Italy, where he was particularly attracted to the artistic milieu, visiting the studios of the greatest artists of the time, including those of Canova and later Thordvaldsen, to whom he returned in 1828, once he had inherited the Baronetcy from his father in 1825.

In the early years of the 19th Century Europe's eyes were fixed on Napoleon and his tumultuous rise to power which undoubtedly did not escape Shaw Stewart. So it is not surprising he seized the opportunity afforded by his travels to meet many of Napoleon's family, including his brother Jérôme and his mother, Madame Mère, but never Napoleon himself. In 1814 he was able to purchase the hat worn by the Emperor throughout the 1807 campaign, from the Keeper of the Palace of Dresden. On his second meeting with Madame Mère, in 1816, she presented him with a full-length portrait of Napoleon by Robert Lefèvre. Shaw Stewart continued to make additional purchases throughout his life, such as the wine bottle and lock of mane from Napoleon's favourite charger, by tradition Marengo's. These later acquisitions serving to demonstrate that his fascination did not diminish over time.

== Personal life ==
Shaw-Stewart married Eliza Mary Farquhar (1799–1851) on 16 September 1819. Farquhar was the daughter of Robert Farquhar, a native of Kintore and Jane Tweedie a native of Antigua of Scottish descent. Farquhar brought to the marriage a large fortune derived her mother's two marriages, firstly to a contractor to and prize agent for the Royal Navy (controversial for the way he handled the latter), and secondly to a sugar plantation owner. Shaw Stewart's marriage produced four sons and four daughters The eldest child was Jane Catherine Shaw Stewart who was a leading nurse and at one time she was close to Florence Nightingale.

== See also ==
- Shaw Stewart baronets

Baronetage of Nova Scotia
Preceded by Michael Shaw Stewart	Baronet (of Greenock and Blackhall); 1825–1836	Succeeded by Michael Shaw-Stewart
