= Sir Michael Shaw Stewart, 5th Baronet =

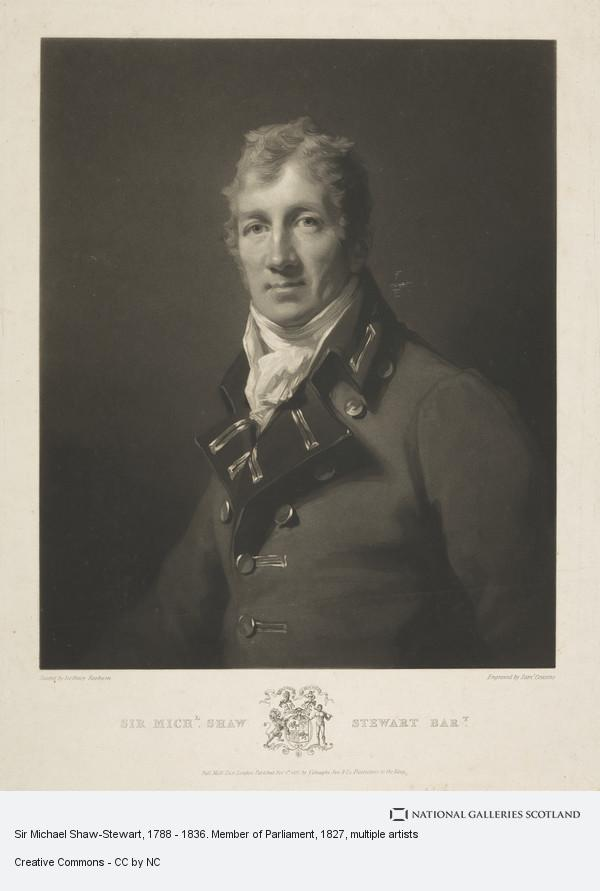
Sir Michael Shaw Stewart 5th Baronet wearing his hunting jacket from the Royal Caledonian Hunt

Sir Michael Shaw-Stewart, 5th Baronet (né Stewart-Nicholson; 10 February 1766 – 3 August 1825). Lord Lieutenant of Renfrewshire between 1822 and 1825.

== Early life ==
He was the son of Houston Stewart-Nicholson (d. 1812) and grandson of Sir Michael Stewart, 3rd Baronet.

== Career ==
Michael Stewart Nicholson of Carnock, succeeded to the lands of Blackhall and Ardgowan on the death of his uncle Sir John Shaw Stewart, 4th Baronet, in 1812. He was invested in these lands in 1813 and dropped the name of Nicholson and became Sir Michael Shaw Stewart of Ardgowan, 5th Baronet.

He served as an officer of the Yeomanry of Renfrewshire, a high office-bearer in the Grand Masonic Lodge of Scotland, and as a keen horseman, Sir Michael was a member of the Royal Caledonian Hunt. He was elected president of the Hunt for the year of 1822

On 24 August 1822, during the Visit of King George IV to Scotland, Sir Michael, dressed in his Yeomanry Uniform attended the banquet at Parliament House provided by the Lord Provost, Magistrates and Town Council of the City of Edinburgh. The previous day he had paraded with the Yeomanry on Portobello Sands for the King's display. Fellow notable members of the Yeomanry on parade and attending the dinner included Sir Walter Scott and Adam Ferguson. Sir Michael's eldest daughter Margaret, also attended aged 20, recorded as wearing "a most elegant dress" of white net, richly embroidered with pearls, and trimmed with a profusion of blond lace, a Manteau of the richest white gros-de-Naples, garniture en-blond and pearls to correspond. A headdress of feathers, pearls, and diamonds. On 27 August in the library at Melville Castle, Sir Michael with other members of the Caledonian Hunt presented the King with an elegantly bound book containing a list of names and the rules of the Caledonian Hunt.

Sir Michael contributed to many charities at home, such as the payment of land rental for the Greenock Infirmary; the education of many poor children in Inverkip over a number of years, providing them with books paper, pens and pencils as well as paying most of the Schoolmasters salary. His most important scheme of all was to commission the building of a reservoir to provide the water for Greenock and neighbouring districts. With friends, he set up Shaws Water Joint Stock Company, which was ratified by Parliament in 1825. The engineer responsible for the building of the reservoir was Robert Thom, and the artificial lake, completed in 1827, became Loch Thom. Living only to see the start of his dream he died on 3 August 1825.

== Personal life ==
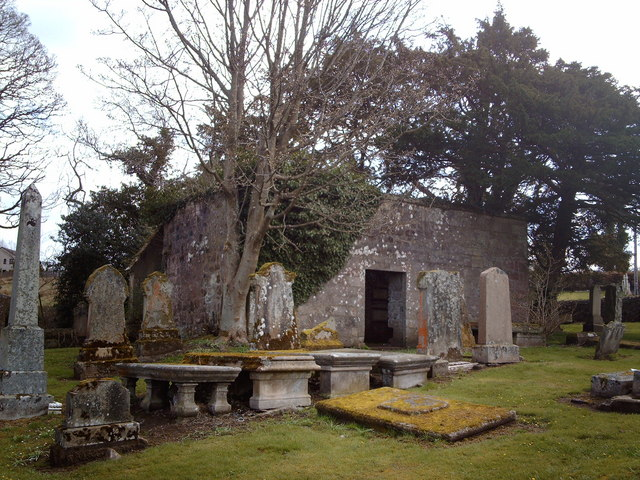
The Shaw-Stewart Mausoleum, The Old Churchyard Inverkip

In 1787 as Michael Nicholson of Carnock, he had married his cousin Catherine Maxwell, youngest daughter of Sir William Maxwell of Springkell and Margaret Stewart, Michael's aunt. The marriage produced 6 sons and three daughters. The Edinburgh Post Office Directory of 1821 shows him at 14 Queen Street, Edinburgh. He also owned the "Roxburgh" slave plantation in Tobago.

Sir Michael died on 3 August 1825.

== See also ==
- Shaw Stewart baronets

Baronetage of Nova Scotia
Preceded by John Shaw Stewart	Baronet (of Greenock and Blackhall); 1812–1825	Succeeded by Michael Shaw-Stewart
