= Robert Mure of Caldwell =

Sir Robert Mure or Muir (died 1620) was a Scottish landowner, imprisoned by James VI for intimidating his tenants.

== Career ==
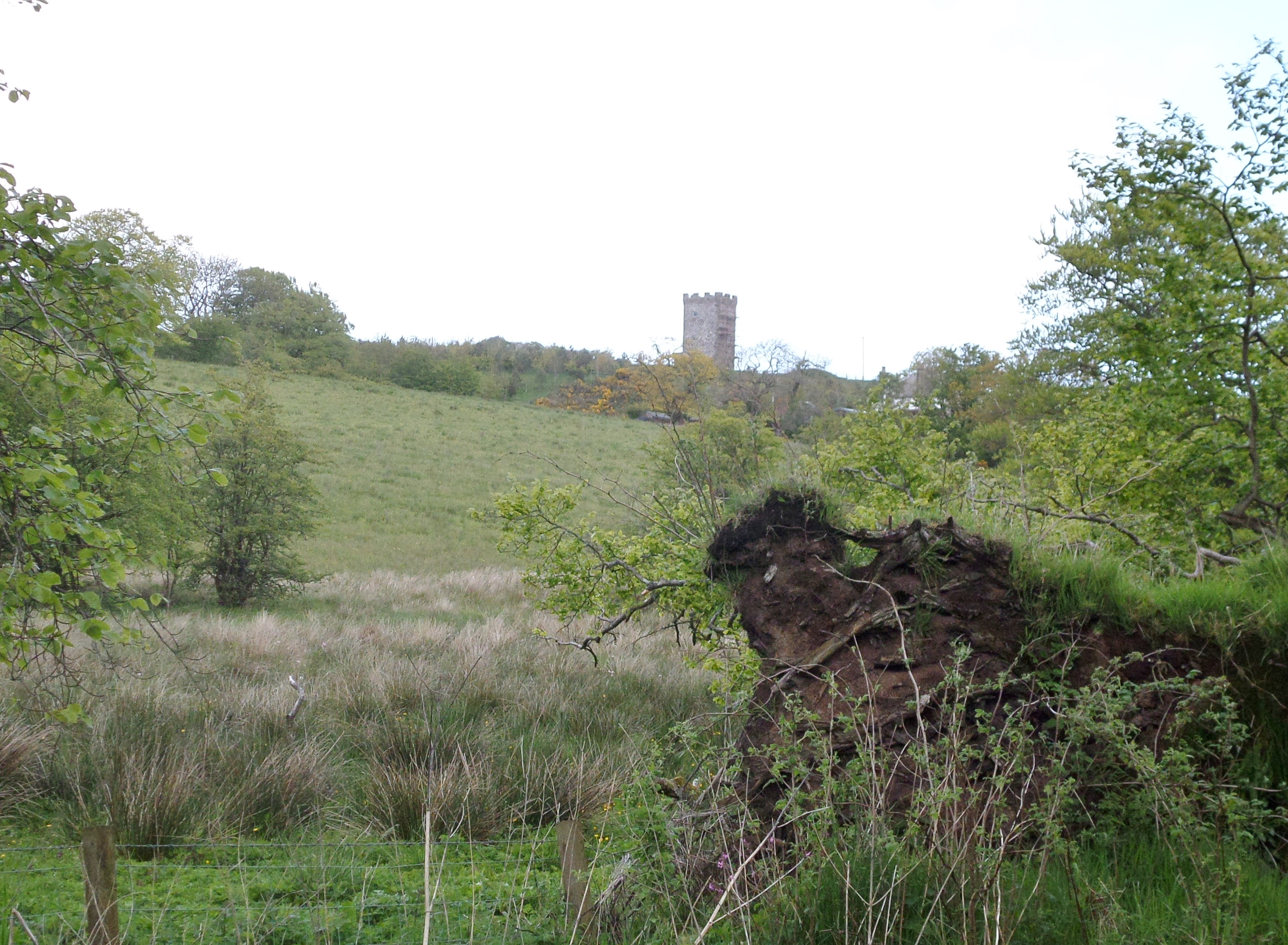
Caldwell Tower, the remains of William Caldwell's castle

He was a son of John Mure of Caldwell and Jonet Kennedy of Bargany. Caldwell is in East Renfrewshire. His father was murdered in 1570, in a feud with William Cunningham and Alexander Cunningham, younger of Aiket, and so John became Laird of Caldwell. He was knighted by James VI and I. In May 1569, John Mure wrote to the Earl of Eglinton about the trial of Marion Niknevin for witchcraft.

=== Guardian of Lord Sempill ===
In 1581 Robert Mure became a guardian of the legal affairs of his stepson Robert, Lord Sempill, known as a "curator", after marrying his mother Barbara Preston. The other curators were Archibald Preston of Valleyfield near Dunfermline and his son James Preston, a servant to the king and master of the royal mint. The curators also made an agreement with the Earl of Glencairn. Previously, Regent Morton (died 1581) had been Lord Sempill's legal "tutor".

On 1 October 1590, James VI of Scotland wrote to Robert Mure, reminding him, as previously requested, to send a hackney horse for the use of the ladies in waiting to his wife Anne of Denmark.

=== The Kittochside feud ===
From 1570, Mure had some difficulties and disagreements with a tenant, John Reid of Kittochside. The lands include the site of the National Museum of Rural Life. Reid complained to the Privy Council at Holyrood Palace in April 1600 that although he held lands at Kittochside by an inherited lease, Robert Mure had harassed him over the past 18 years. In June 1597 Mure had sent his sons to seize him at Kittochside. Reid evaded capture but they had burnt his house down, risking harm to his wife and children. Again in March 1600, Robert Mure and his armed followers came to the house and farm and broke open Reid's coffers and chests. The Mures took clothes, textiles, and livestock. Mure alleged he was justly claiming these goods for a debt, but the Privy Council did not accept this. He was ordered to recompense John Reid and imprisoned in Edinburgh Castle.

James VI agreed that Mure had made sufficient recompense to John Reid on 29 June 1600 and Mure was free to go home. Robert's brother, Alexander Mure, was accused of illegally appearing in public with handguns, "hagbuts and pistolets", in Paisley in 1600 and 1601.

== Marriages ==
He married firstly, Elizabeth Kincaid. Their children included:

- John Mure, who married Helen Hamilton
- James Mure, who married Margaret Mure, a daughter of William Mure of Rowallan; their son was Robert Mure of Caldwell
- Hugh Mure

He married secondly, by 1581, Barbara Preston, daughter of George Preston of Valleyfield, and widow of Robert, Master of Sempill. Their children included:

- Barbara Mure, who married James Hamilton of Preston (died 1644).

== See also ==
- Mure (surname)
