= Lucinda Shaw-Stewart =

Lucinda, Lady Shaw-Stewart(b. ca. 1950?, Yorkshire) has been Trustee of the Royal Collection Trust from 2005; Vice-President of the National Trust for Scotland; Convenor of the National Trust for Scotland's Curatorial Committee; Trustee of Sir William Burrell's Trust; Trustee of the Wallace Collection from 1987.

Born Lucinda Victoria Fletcher, younger daughter of Alexander K H Fletcher. Lady Shaw-Stewart is the widow of Sir Houston Mark Shaw-Stewart, 11th Baronet.

Ardgowan Estate is owned by the Shaw-Stewart family and has been in the family for over 600 years. The house is set in the middle of 400 acres (1.6 km^{2}) of parkland on the south shores of the Firth of Clyde, and is home to Lady Shaw-Stewart and her son Ludovic, the 12th Baronet.

The lands of Ardgowan were given to John Stewart by his father King Robert III of Scotland on 5 May 1403. The estate has been passed down from father to son or uncle to nephew to the present day.

In February 2013, Lady Shaw-Stewart married Christopher Chetwode, younger brother of the 2nd Baron Chetwode.
