= Sir Michael Shaw-Stewart, 7th Baronet =

British baronet and Conservative Party politician

Michael Shaw-Stewart

Lord Lieutenant of Renfrewshire
- In office 1869–1903

Grand Master of the Grand Lodge of Scotland
- In office 1873–1882

Member of Parliament for Renfrewshire
- In office 1855-1865

Personal details
- Born: 26 November 1826
- Died: 10 December 1903 (aged 77)
- Party: Conservative
- Spouse: Octavia Grosvenor (m. 1852)
- Children: 9, including Hugh
- Parent: Michael Shaw-Stewart (father)
- Relatives: Michael Stewart (grandfather); Charles Pierrepont (son-in-law); Richard Grosvenor (father-in-law)

Colonel Sir Michael Robert Shaw-Stewart, 7th Baronet (26 November 1826 – 10 December 1903) was a British baronet and Conservative Party politician. He sat in the House of Commons from 1855 to 1865. He was the son of Sir Michael Shaw-Stewart, 6th Baronet.

== Biography ==
A keen cricketer, Shaw-Stewart played a single first-class cricket match for the Marylebone Cricket Club in 1850. He was said to be a staunch supporter of the Renfrewshire fox hunt.

In May 1855, he was elected at an unopposed by-election as the Member of Parliament (MP) for Renfrewshire. He was re-elected in 1857 and 1859, and held the seat until his defeat at the 1865 general election.

Shaw-Stewart was Lord Lieutenant of Renfrewshire from 1869 to 1903 and Grand Master of the Grand Lodge of Scotland from 1873 to 1882. He bought the manor of Hindon, Wiltshire from his wife's mother and was appointed High Sheriff of Wiltshire for 1883.

== Personal life ==
On 28 December 1852, he married Lady Octavia Grosvenor, sixth daughter of the 2nd Marquess of Westminster. They had five sons and four daughters, including Sir Michael Hugh Shaw-Stewart, 8th Baronet (1854–1942); Walter Richard Shaw-Stewart (1861–1934); and Helen Shaw-Stewart, who married Charles Pierrepont, 4th Earl Manvers.

== See also ==
- Shaw Stewart baronets

Parliament of the United Kingdom
| Preceded by William Mure | Member of Parliament for Renfrewshire; 1855–1865 | Succeeded by Archibald Alexander Speirs |
Honorary titles
| Preceded by The Earl of Glasgow | Lord Lieutenant of Renfrewshire; 1869–1903 | Succeeded by The Lord Blythswood |
Masonic offices
| Preceded by The Earl of Rosslyn | Grand Master of the Grand Lodge of Scotland; 1873–1882 | Succeeded by The Earl of Mar |
Baronetage of Nova Scotia
| Preceded by Michael Shaw-Stewart | Baronet (of Blackhall); 1836–1903 | Succeeded by Hugh Shaw-Stewart |
