= William Mure (1718–1776) =

Scottish lawyer and politician

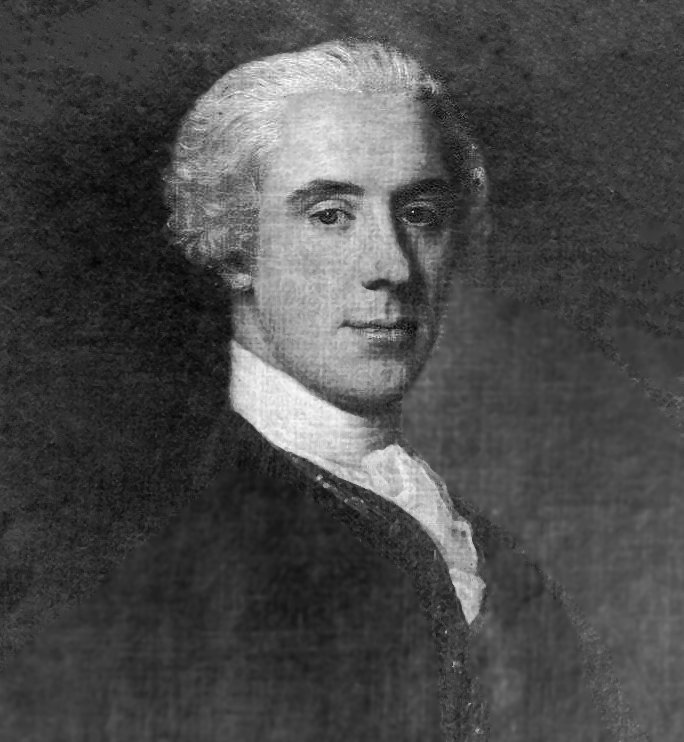

Lord Rector of Glasgow University
- In office 1764–1767
- Preceded by: 1st Baronet Miller
- Succeeded by: 4th Earl of Selkirk

Baron of the Court of Exchequer in Scotland
- In office 1761–1776

Member of Parliament for Renfrewshire
- In office 1742–1761
- Preceded by: Alexander Cunninghame
- Succeeded by: Patrick Crauford

Personal details
- Born: December 1718
- Died: 25 March 1776
- Spouse: Anne Graham
- Children: 6
- Parent(s): William Mure; Anne Stewart
- Relatives: Sir James Stewart (grandfather); Sir James Stewart, Bt. (uncle); Sir James Stewart, 2nd Bt. (cousin); William Mure (grandson); David Mure (grandson); William Mure (great-grandson); 4th Baron Ribblesdale (2x great-grandson)
- Education: Glasgow University
- Occupation: Lawyer

William Mure (December 1718 – 25 March 1776), known as others of his family as William Mure of Caldwell, was a Scottish lawyer and politician. He became a Baron of the Scots Exchequer and was a friend of Prime Minister Lord Bute and David Hume.

== Early life ==
Mure was born late in 1718, the eldest son and successor to William Mure of Caldwell in Ayr and Renfrewshire, by his wife Anne Stewart, daughter of Sir James Stewart (1635–1713), Lord Advocate, and widow of James Maxwell of Blawarthill. His mother's brother was James Stewart, 1st Baronet (1681–1727). The Mure line of Caldwell is distantly related to William Mure (1594–1657), the writer, and a descendant of the Mure/Muir line of Rowallan. He had one sister, Agnes Mure (d. 1758), who married Rev. Patrick Boyle (1717–1798), son of John Boyle, 2nd Earl of Glasgow.

His father dying in April 1722, he was brought up at home by his mother, under the tutorship of William Leechman; later Mure helped Leechman to his position of Principal of Glasgow University.

== Career ==
Mure graduated from Glasgow University in 1730, studied law at Edinburgh and Leyden, and travelled during 1741 in France and Holland. Returning to Scotland in November 1742, he was elected Member of Parliament for Renfrewshire, a seat which he held without opposition during three parliaments till 1761, when he was appointed a baron of the Scots exchequer. He spoke rarely, and attended irregularly, his principal interest lying in agricultural improvements.

He is best known as the friend of Lord Bute and David Hume. He helped Bute with the management of the Bute estates, became a close friend and adviser, and as Bute rose in politics was eventually one of the most influential men in Scotland, with input into its local affairs and the distribution of Scottish patronage. He corresponded much with Hume from 1742, and Hume visited Mure's house at Abbey Hill, near Holyrood. Apropos of his History Hume wrote Mure in 1756: ‘If you do not say that I have done both parties justice, and if Mrs. Mure be not sorry for poor King Charles, I shall burn all my papers and return to philosophy.’

In 1764 and 1765, he was Lord Rector of Glasgow University, and was again put in nomination for that post in 1776, but was defeated.

Mure was known in Scottish literary society, and published privately tracts on political economy. Letters addressed to him and other papers are published with a portrait in the ‘Caldwell Papers,’ vols. ii. and iii.

== Personal life ==
In 1752, he married Anne Grahame, daughter of James Grahame, Lord Easdale (1696–1750). Lord Easdale, the second son of John Graham of Dougalston (1669–1722), became an advocate on 9 February 1723. He was appointed a Judge of the Court of Session on 3 June 1749, succeeding Robert Dundas of Arniston, and received the title of Lord Easdale. He only served briefly, as he died at Edinburgh in August 1750. Together, William and Anne had two sons and four daughters. His children included:

- William Mure (d. 1831), colonel of the Renfrew militia who also served as Lord Rector of Glasgow University (from 1793 to 1794), who married Anne Blair (d. 1854), daughter of Sir James Hunter Blair, 1st Baronet (1741–1787) of Dunskey, Wigtownshire.
- James Mure
- Catherine Mure, who married James Rannie (1733–1805)

He died at Caldwell on 25 March 1776 of gout in the stomach.

=== Descendants ===
His granddaughter, Catherine Rannie (1790–1821), who married John Campbell Swinton of Kimmerghame (1777–1867) in 1809, was the mother of Archibald Campbell Swinton (1812–1890), the author and politician, and James Rannie Swinton (1816–1888), the portrait artist. His grandsons included William Mure (1799–1860), an MP for Renfrewshire from 1846 to 1855, and David Mure, Lord Mure (1810–1891), an MP for Buteshire from 1859 to 1865. His great-grandson, William Mure (1830–1880), was also an MP for Renfrewshire, from 1874 to 1880. Through his great-granddaughter, Emma Mure (1833–1911), who married Thomas Lister, 3rd Baron Ribblesdale (1828–1876), he was the great-great grandfather of Thomas Lister, 4th Baron Ribblesdale (1854–1925), who married the American heiress, Ava Lowle Willing (1868–1958), the former wife of John Jacob Astor IV (1864–1912).

Parliament of Great Britain
Preceded by Alexander; Cunninghame	Member of Parliament for Renfrewshire; 1742 – 1761	Succeeded by Patrick Crauford
