= Baron of Preston =

Title of nobility in the Baronage of Scotland

Baron of Preston or Baron of Preston and Prestonpans is a title of nobility in the Baronage of Scotland.

For most of its history it was referred to as the Barony of Preston and Prestonpans, but as of 1663 the names were unified into one free barony, the Barony of Preston.

The name ‘Preston’ signifies the town or settlement of priests, which results from monks from Newbattle and Holyrood settling in the district in 1184 AD. An early industry was saltpanning, centered in the adjacent Prestonpans.

The present baron is Robert Ian Lin McLean, Baron of Preston.

== History of the Hamiltons of Preston ==
Preston belonged to the Hamiltons from the latter half of the 14th century. Sir John Hamilton IV of Fingalton married twice, secondly to Jane, daughter of Sir James Liddell of Preston about 1400. He was succeeded sometime before 1438 by his son Sir James Hamilton. He married an Agnes Hamilton and had a son and two daughters. The son, Sir Robert succeeded to the lands and titles by 1460. He was known as Sir Robert Hamilton of Fingalton and Salt Preston. Sir Robert is known to have undertaken a pilgrimage to Rome in 1452–1453. King James III of Scotland appointed Sir Robert as a conservator of the peace between Scotland and England after the Treaty of Nottingham in 1482. He died in 1489 leaving a widow, Marion Johnstone, and 3 sons. His eldest son Sir Robert succeeded.

Sir Robert Hamilton, 3rd of Fingalton, married three times, and had 4 children of whom Robert the eldest succeeded. He married Catherine Tweedie and they had four children. Their eldest son James Hamilton was killed in 1520 before his father’s death in 1520, during an incident known as "Cleanse the Causeway" on the High Street of Edinburgh in 1520. The lands and titles went to the second son David. He expanded the family’s landholdings and accompanied King James V on his matrimonial voyage to France when he married Magdalene daughter of King Francis I of France. When the Earl of Hertford invaded Scotland in 1544 the town and castle of Preston was destroyed. Later Sir David was created Knight Banneret and Marischal Deputy of Scotland. Sir David also is noted as an early adherent of Protestantism in Scotland. He married Janet Baillie and they had 13 children of whom George, the eldest succeeded.

George Hamilton is noted as having re-established a parish church in Preston, built by the minister John Davidson in 1596, and founding an academy there. George married Barbara Cockburn (died 1610), a daughter of John Cockburn of Ormiston, in 1563. and they had 11 children of whom John, the eldest, succeeded.

Sir John Hamilton born 1565, received crown charters of the united baronies of Preston and Prestonpans in 1617 and 1623. On 20 August 1617 King James VI granted Sir John Hamilton of Preston and Lady Jean Otterburn his spouse, the lands of Preston and Prestonpans, and on 28 March 1623 the king granted Sir John Hamilton of Preston the lands and barony of Preston and Prestonpans etc. Sir John supported the Covenanters and opposed the policies of King Charles I. He married three times. The initials of John Hamilton and his wife Katherine Howieson were carved in the stonework of Preston Tower. He was succeeded by his first born son Sir James in May 1644.

Sir James Hamilton was born in 1589. He married Barbara Mure in 1609, a daughter of Robert Mure of Caldwell. He was knighted in 1615. He died in October 1644. He was a zealous Covenanter. Sir James seems to have been granted the lands and barony of Preston in 1629. On 1 May 1632, Sir James Hamilton of Fingalton, was served heir to his son Robert Hamilton of Preston, in the lands and barony of Preston and Prestonpans with Preston a free burgh of barony. His eldest surviving son John succeeded to the lands and titles.

5 November 1644, John Hamilton of Preston was served heir to his father Sir James Hamilton of Fingalton in the lands and barony of Preston and Prestonpans and Preston, a free burgh of barony. John Hamilton entailed his estates, and when he died in 1647 without issue, the lands and titles went to his uncle Robert Hamilton of Sauchieburn, second son of Sir John Hamilton of Preston, who had served as a Colonel under King Gustavus Adolphus of Sweden during the Thirty Years War. He died in 1648 but with no sons.

The lands and titles then went to Sir Thomas Hamilton, born 1618, 3rd son of George Hamilton of Preston, who was served heir to John Hamilton his paternal uncle's grandson nepotism patrui in the baronies of Preston and Prestonpans on 2 June 1647.

Sir Thomas accompanied King Charles II during the invasion of England in 1651 which ended in disaster at Worcester. As his lands and residence had been destroyed by Cromwell’s army during the occupation of Scotland after 1651 many original charters were lost. Consequently, the Scots Parliament reissued them including one for the united baronies of Preston and Prestonpans on 4 June 1663. 20 August 1663, King Charles II granted a Crown Charter to Robert Preston of Preston in liferent and his eldest son John Preston, and heirs the above lands now as the free barony of Preston with the town of Preston being created as a free burgh of barony with the right to hold markets. He married three times and by his second wife Anne Hamilton, had two sons William and Robert, both of whom became baronets of Preston in succession.

William Hamilton, 1st baronet, born 1647, became a baronet of Nova Scotia in 1673. He took refuge in Holland and later accompanied William of Orange from Holland to England at the Glorious Revolution of 1688 but died in London shortly thereafter. He married Rachel Nicolson and had three daughters. Consequently, the land and titles were succeeded to by his brother Robert.

Sir Robert Hamilton of Preston (1650-1701) was a zealous Presbyterian and led the Covenanters at the victory at the Battle of Drumclog and at the failure at Bothwell Bridge in 1679. He then fled to the continent and lived in Holland. He later returned to Scotland where he was arrested and imprisoned in 1692–1693.

Sir Robert Hamilton, died 1701, being unmarried conveyed his rights to Thomas Oswald. After the Oswalds the estate was acquired by Lord Grange much of which was eventually bought by Dr James Schaw. Lord and Lady Grange lived at Preston House which was built towards the end of the 16th century for Thomas, son of Sir James Oswald, Lord Provost of Edinburgh and was eventually acquired by Dr James Schaw about 1780 when he acquired the Barony of Preston. Dr. Schaw died in 1784, leaving the barony and the bulk of his estate in support of James Schaw’s Hospital, a school for boys. The successor of the Schaw Bequest was the East Lothian Educational Trust. In the Crown Charter (1830) the Barony is described as:

"ALL and WHOLE the Lands and Barony of Preston and Prestonpans with the free Burgh of Barony of Preston and free sea port and harbour thereof for ships with the whole privileges, liberties, casualties and commodities whatsoever pertaining and belonging to the said free Burgh of Barony and harbor aforesaid with the manor place of Preston, houses, biggings, yards, orchards, miln, multures, hains, customs, casualties and duties, saltpans, coal, coalheughs, tenants, tenandries, and services of free tenants and all privileges, liberties, parts, pendicles, and pertinents of the same whatsoever as also ALL and WHOLE the tiend sheaves of the said Lands and Barony of Preston and Prestonpans with tofts, crofts, outsetts,, parts, pendicles and whole pertinents thereof with the privilege and liberty of a weekly market upon Thursday and of one free fair yearly beginning upon the first day of October and continuing for the first, second and third days of the said month commonly called St. Jerom’s Fair with the whole tolls and customs of the said weekly market and yearly free fair of all united, erected, annexed and incorporated by the ancient infeftments thereof into one free barony called the Barony of Preston, lying in the Constabulary of Haddington and Sheriffdom of Edinburgh"

The barony of Preston was eventually sold by the Trust and was acquired by Professor David Ian McLean. The present Baron of Preston is Robert Ian Lin McLean.
