= Lord Lieutenant of Renfrewshire =

Ceremonial officer in Renfrewshire, Scotland

- Flag of a lord-lieutenant
- Incumbent; Colonel Peter McCarthy since 28 March 2019
- Appointer: King Charles III
- Term length: Until the incumbent reaches the age of 75.
- Inaugural holder: William McDowall
- Formation: 1794
- Deputy: Hugh McKechnie Currie DL
- Website: http://www.renfrewshirelieutenancy.org.uk

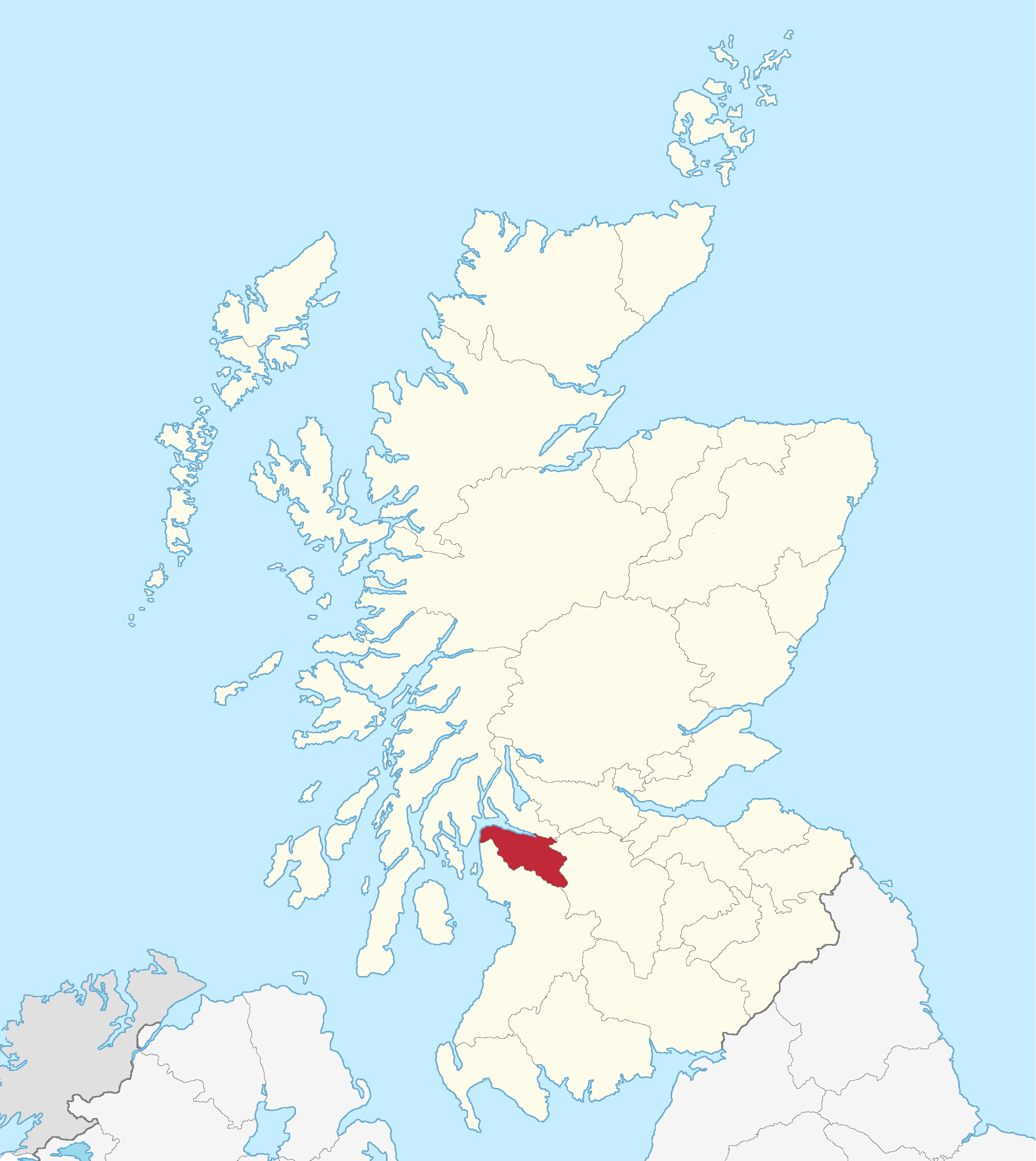
Renfrewshire within Scotland

The Lord-Lieutenant of Renfrewshire is the representative of the British Crown covering a lieutenancy area of the county of Renfrewshire in the west central Lowlands of Scotland.

The Lord Lieutenant deals with many of the ceremonial functions associated with representing the Sovereign in his area, co-ordinates Royal visits to the county, presents awards, maintains close links with the British Armed Forces and liaises with the King's private office on county matters.

The current Lord Lieutenant of Renfrewshire is, since March 2019, is Colonel Peter McCarthy. He is assisted by up to 26 Deputy Lieutenants, amongst them the Vice Lord Lieutenant, held as of 1 July 2019 by Hugh McKechnie Currie. The Clerk to the Lieutenancy is Mrs Linda Hutchison and is based at the headquarters of East Renfrewshire Council in Giffnock.

The Renfrewshire lieutenancy was formed in 1794 when permanent lieutenancies were appointed by Royal Warrant to all the counties of Scotland. The Lord-Lieutenants (Scotland) Order 1996 defined the area of the Renfrewshire lieutenancy as covering the local government districts of Renfrew, Eastwood and Inverclyde - covering the area of the county of Renfrewshire. Later that year, these districts were altered into unitary council areas named Renfrewshire, Inverclyde and East Renfrewshire.

== Current Lord Lieutenant ==
On 13 March 2019, Queen Elizabeth II announced that Colonel Peter McCarthy would take the position of lord-lieutenant following the retirement of Guy Clark.

McCarthy was born in 1953 and after attending Welbeck College served as an army officer in the Royal Electrical and Mechanical Engineers. In 2004, he became an operations director for the British Red Cross. He was previously Vice Lord Lieutenant of Renfrewshire.

== List of Lord Lieutenants of Renfrewshire ==
- William McDowall 17 March 1794 – 3 April 1810
- George Boyle, 4th Earl of Glasgow 11 April 1810 – 1820
- Robert Stuart, 11th Lord Blantyre 5 February 1820 – 1822
- Sir Michael Shaw-Stewart, 5th Baronet 10 December 1822 – 25 August 1825
- Archibald Campbell 11 August 1825 – 13 June 1838
- Alexander Speirs 8 August 1838 – 5 October 1844
- James Boyle, 5th Earl of Glasgow 19 October 1844 – 11 March 1869
- Sir Michael Shaw-Stewart, 7th Baronet 20 April 1869 – 10 December 1903
- Archibald Campbell, 1st Baron Blythswood 6 February 1904 – 8 July 1908
- Sir Thomas Glen-Coats, 1st Baronet 23 July 1908 – 12 July 1922
- Sir Michael Shaw-Stewart, 8th Baronet 25 November 1922 – 29 June 1942
- Alexander Hagart-Speirs 30 March 1943 – 1950
- Sir Walter Shaw-Stewart, 9th Baronet 27 November 1950 – 1967
- John Maclay, 1st Viscount Muirshiel 12 December 1967 – 1980
- (John) David Makgill-Crichton-Maitland 13 November 1980 – 1994
- James Goold, Baron Goold 28 October 1994 – 27 July 1997
- Cameron Parker 24 June 1998 – 2007
- Guy Clark 2 June 2007 – 28 March 2019
- Col. Peter McCarthy 28 March 2019 – Present

== Deputy lieutenants ==
A deputy lieutenant of Renfrewshire is commissioned by the Lord Lieutenant of Renfrewshire. Deputy lieutenants support the work of the lord-lieutenant. There can be several deputy lieutenants at any time, depending on the population of the county. Their appointment does not terminate with the changing of the lord-lieutenant, but they usually retire at age 75.
