= Royal Red Cross =

Military decoration awarded in the Commonwealth

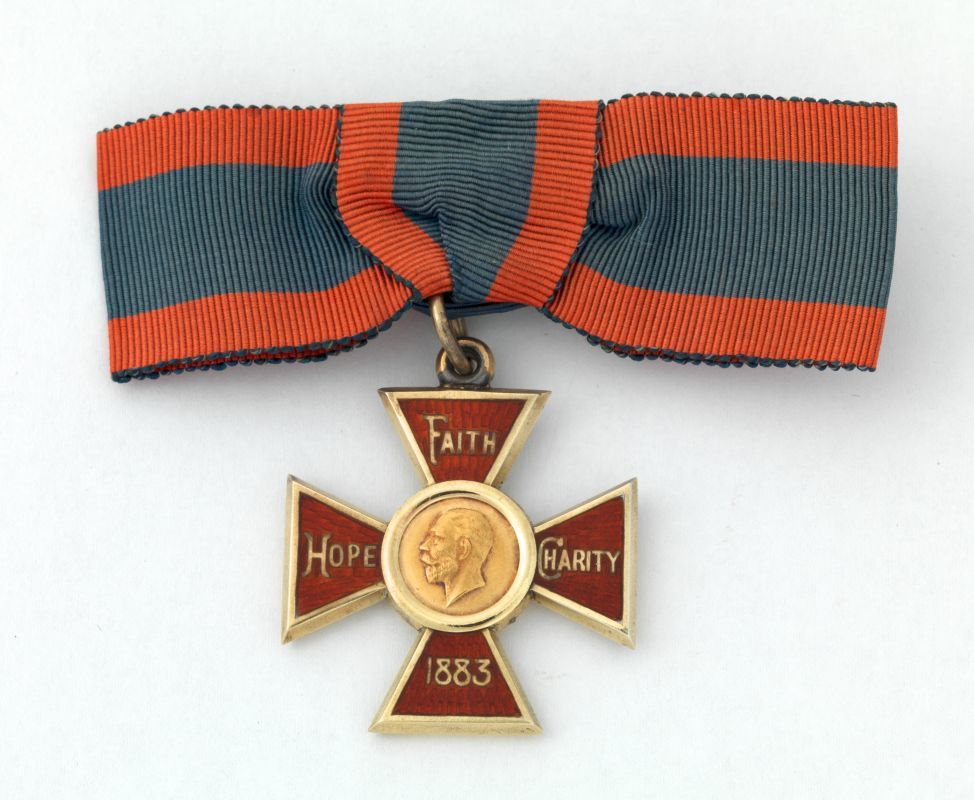
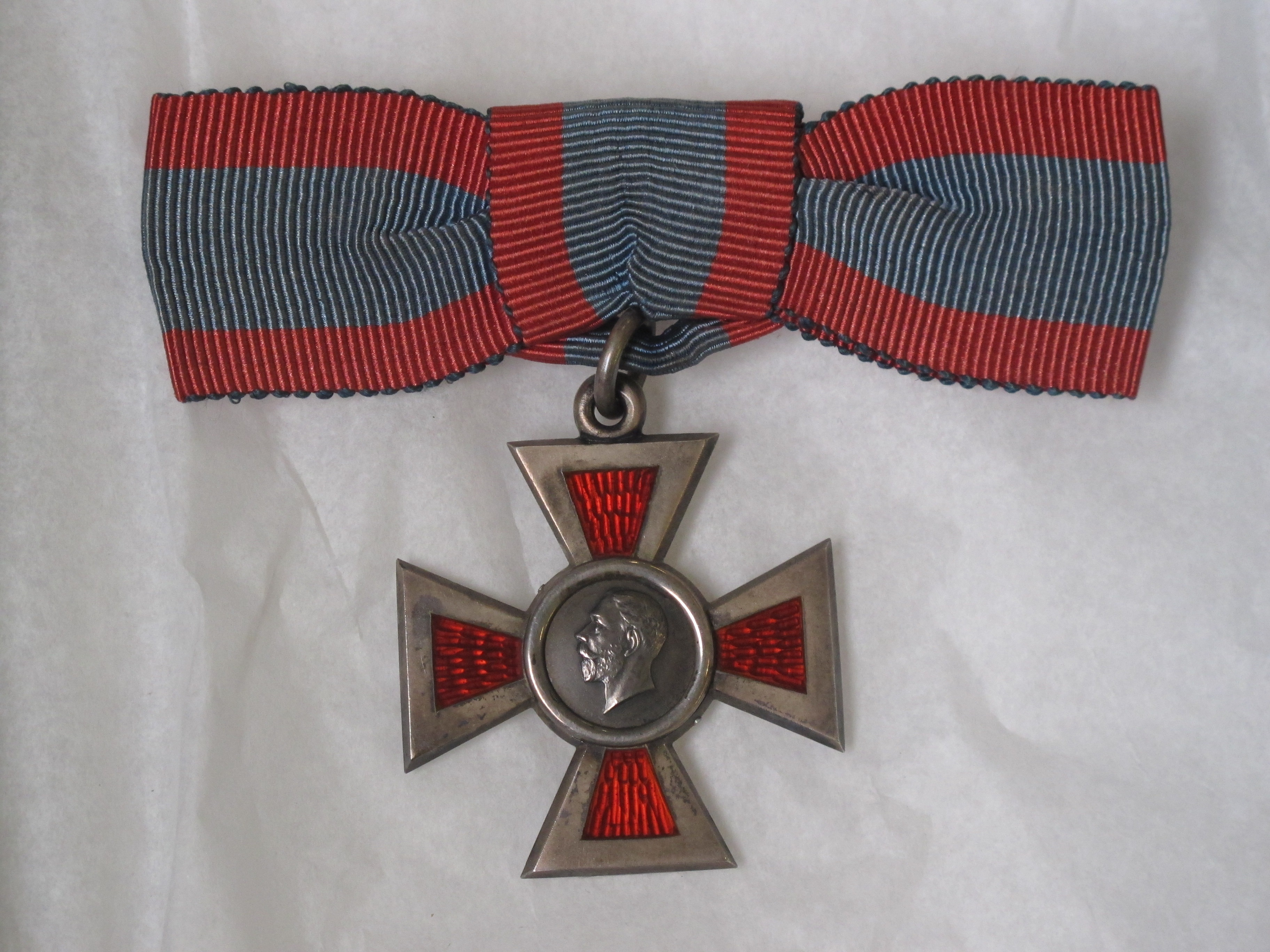
- Badge of the Royal Red Cross Badge of an Associate of the Royal Red Cross
- Type: decoration
- Awarded for: Exceptional services in military nursing
- Presented by: United Kingdom
- Eligibility: Members of the Military Nursing Services
- Post-nominals: RRC; ARRC
- Established: 27 April 1883
- Ribbon bar

Order of Wear
- Next (higher): Conspicuous Gallantry Cross (CGC); Air Force Cross (AFC)
- Next (lower): Distinguished Service Cross (DSC); Order of Saint John

The Royal Red Cross (RRC) is a military decoration awarded in the United Kingdom and Commonwealth for exceptional services in military nursing. It was created in 1883, and the first two awards were to Florence Nightingale and Jane Cecilia Deeble. Deeble had served in Zulu Kingdom and the Colony of Natal during the Anglo-Zulu War in 1879, and she had noted that the work of the nurses was not recognised officially.

== Foundation and first awards ==
Queen Victoria established the award by Royal Proclamation on 27 April 1883. The decoration was to be conferred, as recommended by the Secretary for State for War or First Lord of the Admiralty, on ladies for special exertions in the providing of nursing for sick and wounded soldiers and sailors and on nursing sisters for special devotion and competency displayed in nursing duties for the army in the field or in the military and naval hospitals In addition, the Royal Red Cross could be worn by Queens and Princesses of the United Kingdom of Great Britain and Ireland. At this time there was a single class of the award.

The first awards were made in May 1883 under provision of Queen Victoria's warrant. The recipients included Florence Nightingale and Jane Cecilia Deeble. Deeble had served in Zululand and she had noted that the work of the nurses was not recognised officially. The award was created after this comment was passed to the Queen's senior official, Sir Henry Ponsonby, after he was told that "a word of recognition from the Queen … would make her and them [i.e. Jane Cecilia Deeble and the nurses] happy and proud for the rest of their lives". Also receiving the award at this time were 22 nursing sisters and Lady Loyd-Lindsay, founder of the National Aid Society (later the British Red Cross Society).

== Later changes to the award ==
A second and lower class, Associate, was added during the First World War in November 1915 under a Royal Proclamation of King George V.

The award is made to a fully trained nurse of an officially recognised nursing service, military or civilian, who has shown exceptional devotion and competence in the performance of nursing duties, over a continuous and long period, or who has performed an exceptional act of bravery and devotion at their post of duty. It is conferred on members of the nursing services regardless of rank. Holders of the second class who receive a further award are promoted to the first class, although an initial award can also be made in the first class. Holders of the first class who receive a further award are awarded a bar.

The decoration was conferred exclusively on women until 1976, when men became eligible, with posthumous awards permitted from 1979.

Awards are announced in The Gazette.

Recipients of the Royal Red Cross are entitled to use the post-nominal letters "RRC" for Members and "ARRC" for Associates.

== Description ==
- The badge for the RRC is in the shape of a golden cross, 1.375 inches (3.49 cm) wide, the obverse enamelled red, with a circular medallion, bearing an effigy of the reigning monarch at its centre. The words "Faith", "Hope" and "Charity" are inscribed on the upper limbs of the cross, with the year "1883" in the lower limb.
  The reverse is plain except a circular medallion bearing the royal cypher of the reigning monarch.
- The badge for the ARRC is in the shape of a silver cross, 1.375 inches (3.49 cm) wide, the obverse enamelled red, with broad silver edges around the enamel; a circular medallion bearing an effigy of the reigning monarch at its centre.
  The reverse has a circular medallion bearing the royal cypher of the reigning monarch, with the words "Faith", "Hope" and "Charity" inscribed on the upper three limbs of the cross, with the year "1883" in the lower limb.
- The ribbon for both grades is dark blue with crimson edge stripes. The decoration is worn by women from the ribbon in the form of a bow, although it can be worn by both sexes in military uniform on a straight ribbon alongside other medals.
- To recognise further exceptional devotion and competency in the performance of nursing duties or exceptional act of bravery and devotion at their post of duty, a bar may be awarded to a recipient of the RRC. The bar is linked to the cross and is made of red enamel. A rosette is worn on the ribbon in undress to denote a bar to the RRC.

== See also ==
- British and Commonwealth orders and decorations
