= William Mure (1830–1880) =

British soldier and Liberal Party politician

Member of Parliament for Renfrewshire
- In office 1874–1880
- Preceded by: Archibald Campbell
- Succeeded by: Alexander Crum

Personal details
- Born: 9 May 1830 Caldwell, Ayrshire
- Died: 9 November 1880 (aged 50)
- Party: Liberal
- Spouse: Constance Elizabeth Wyndham (m. 1859)
- Relations: David Mure (uncle); Thomas Lister (nephew); George Wyndham (father-in-law)
- Children: 4
- Parent(s): William Mure; Laura Markham

Military service
- Branch/service: Scots Fusilier Guards
- Rank: Lieutenant-Colonel

William Mure, of Caldwell (9 May 1830 – 9 November 1880) was a British soldier and Liberal Party politician.

== Early life ==
Mure was the son of Laura Markham and William Mure (1799–1860), also a former MP for Renfrewshire. He was the nephew of David Mure. His mother was the second daughter of William Markham of Becca Hall, Yorkshire, and the granddaughter of William Markham (1719–1807) the Archbishop of York from 1776 to 1807.

Mure's sister, Emma (1833–1911), who married Thomas Lister, 3rd Baron Ribblesdale (1828–1876), was the mother of Thomas Lister, 4th Baron Ribblesdale, whose second marriage was to the American heiress, Ava Lowle Willing (1868–1958), former wife of John Jacob Astor IV.

== Career ==
Mure reached the rank of Lieutenant-Colonel in the Scots Fusilier Guards. He was elected at the 1874 general election as the Member of Parliament (MP) for Renfrewshire, and reelected at the 1880 general election.

== Personal life ==
In 1859, Mure married Constance Elizabeth Wyndham (d. 1920), daughter of George Wyndham, 1st Baron Leconfield and Mary Fanny Blunt, and sister of Henry Wyndham, 2nd Baron Leconfield. Her maternal grandfather was the Reverend William Blunt and her paternal grandfather was George Wyndham, 3rd Earl of Egremont. Together they had:

- Lt.-Col. William Mure of Caldwell (d. 1912), who married Lady Georgiana Theresa Montgomerie (d. 1938), daughter of George Montgomerie, 15th Earl of Eglinton, in 1895.
- Constance Madeline Emma Mure (d. 1961), who married Edward Lawrence Peel (1860–1936), the son of Sir Charles Lennox Peel, in 1905.
- Marjorie Caroline Susan Mure (d. 1961), who married John Michael Gordon Biddulph, 2nd Baron Biddulph (1869–1949), in 1896.
- Mary Laura Florence Mure (d. 1932), who married Sir Spencer John Portal, 4th Bt. (1864–1955), in 1890.

Mure died on 9 November 1880, aged 50.

Parliament of the United Kingdom
Preceded by Archibald Campbell	Member of Parliament for Renfrewshire; 1874 – 1880	Succeeded by Alexander Crum
