= Army List =

List of British Army officers

The Army List is a list (or more accurately seven series of lists) of serving regular, militia or territorial British Army officers, kept in one form or another, since 1702.

Manuscript lists of army officers were kept from 1702 to 1752, the first official list being published in 1740.

== Regular army ==
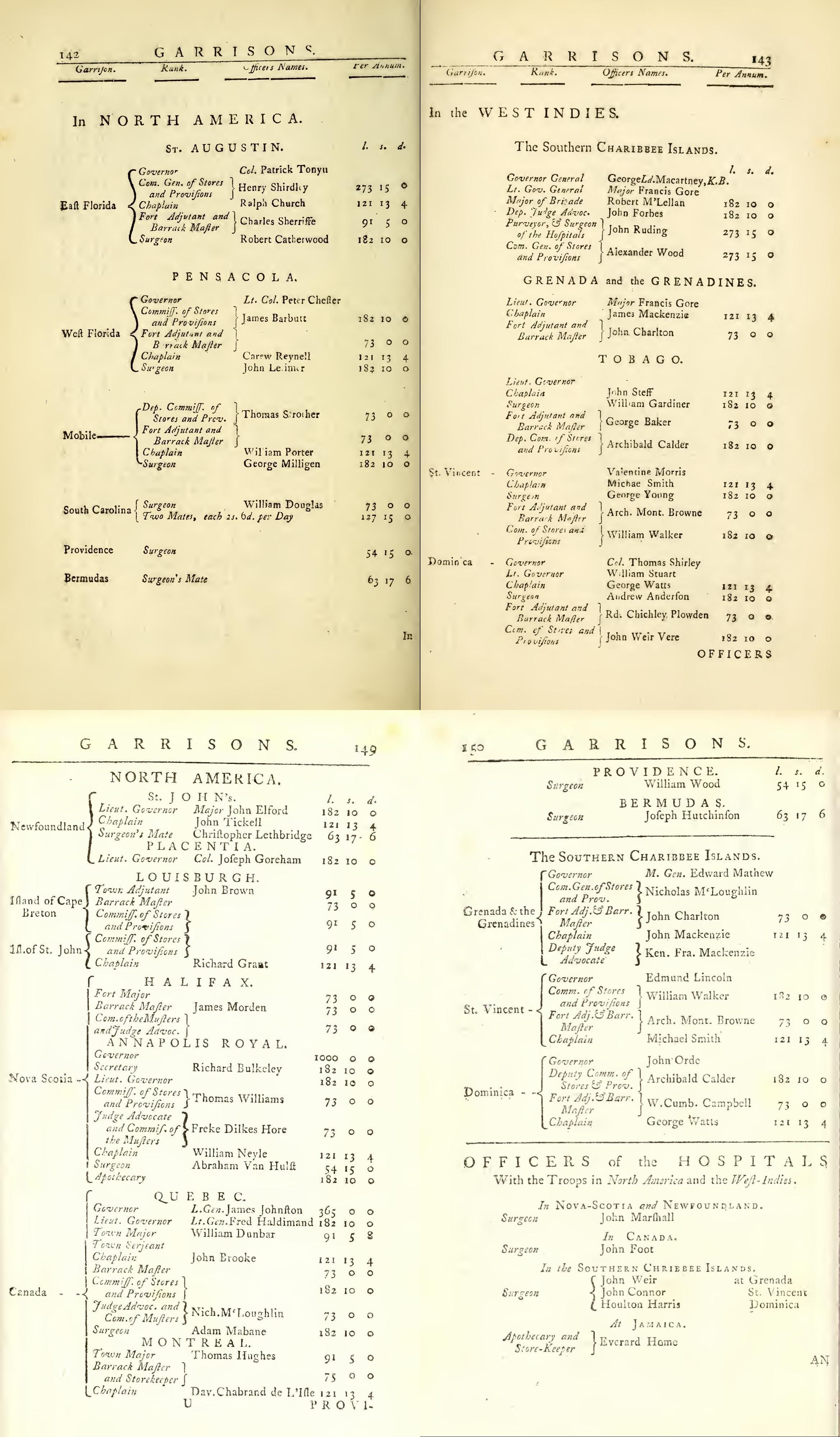
Governors and Staff in North America and the West Indies 1778 and 1784

- Annual Army Lists, 1754–1879 (WO 65)
- Quarterly Army Lists (First Series), 1879–1922
- Half-Yearly Army Lists, 1923 – February 1950 (from 1947, annual, despite the name)
- Modern Army Lists, 1951–ongoing
  - Part 1; serving officers.
  - Part 2; retired officers, as of 2011 four-yearly
  - Part 3; the Gradation List, a short biography of officers, a restricted publication not generally available.

== Women ==
The first woman to appear in a British Army List was Jane Catherine Shaw Stewart when she was appointed to Netley Hospital in May 1863.

== Other lists ==
- Monthly Army Lists, 1798 – June 1940. Officers of colonial, militia and territorial units are included.
- Quarterly Army Lists (Second Series), July 1940 – December 1950. These superseded the Monthly Army Lists, and, for the remainder of World War II were not published but produced as confidential documents, monthly or bi-monthly until December 1943 and quarterly until April 1947, then three times a year, April, August and December.
- Home Guard List, 1939–1945
- Militia Lists: various militia lists pertaining to the eighteenth and nineteenth centuries are extant.
- Hart's Army List, an unofficial list, produced between 1839 and 1915, containing details of war service which the official lists started covering only in 1881.

== See also ==
- Crockford's Clerical Directory
- Navy List
