= Becca Hall =

Country house in Aberford, West Yorkshire, England

Coordinates: 53.84110°N 1.37079°W

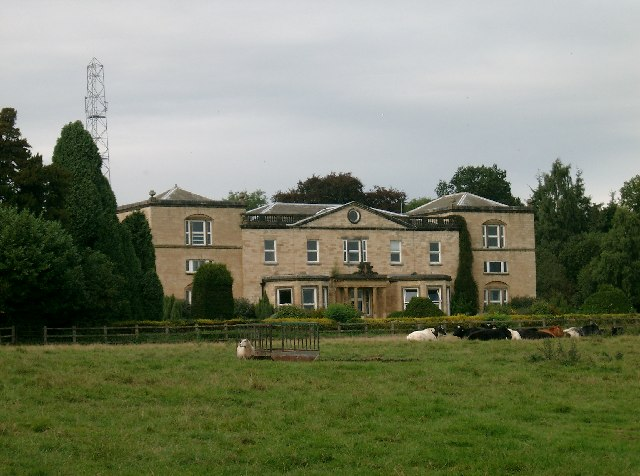
Becca Hall

Becca Hall is a country residence situated in Aberford, Leeds, West Yorkshire, Yorkshire, at OS grid reference Lat.53:50:35N Lon.1:22:08W. It is situated on Becca Lane within the old Gascoigne estate. The house is a Grade II listed building.

== Etymology ==
The name of Becca Hall is first attested in 1189, in the cartulary of Nostell Priory, simply as Becca. This is thought to come from the Old English word bæce ('beck'), itself a loan-word from Old Norse bekkr (meaning the same). The beck in question is probably the Cock Beck. From 1244 into at least the eighteenth century, however, the name is usually attested in forms with a second element derived from Old English haga ('hedge, enclosure'), in spellings such as Bethaye, Bekhaw, and Bekhaghe. Thus the name in this form meant 'enclosure by the beck'. The name Beckhay Hall is first attested in 1716. The modern form Becca Hall is a reduced form of this name.

== History ==
The house was built in 1783 for William Markham, the son of William Markham, Archbishop of York and the private secretary to Warren Hastings. It descended in the Markham family for several generations until it was sold in 1894 by Ronald Markham to Arthur Thomas Schreiber, who lived there until his death in 1902. His widow remained at the hall until her own death in 1907, when it was sold to a Bradford wool magnate Frederick James Lund, who lived there until 1922. It was then sold to Thomas Percy Fawcett, a maltster from Castleford, whose family owned the house until 1949, when it was bought by the Thompson family. In 1958 it was bought by the Central Electricity Generating Board (CEGB).

Following the privatisation of the UK electricity industry in 1989, ownership of the property passed to the National Grid Company. It was used to house the Leeds Grid Control Centre for the UK's electricity transmission network from 1958 until its operational closure in 1997. Advances in communications technology (including remote substation operation) during this period reduced the requirement for regional control centres. By the time of its operational closure in 1997, the entire electricity transmission network in England and Wales could be controlled from a single control room anywhere in the country. Later used as a control centre, it performed as one of the control centres for the Dinorwig hydroelectric storage facility in North Wales.

After being relinquished by the National Grid, the house passed through the hands of a series of would-be developers with various plans, all of which came to nothing. An application for planning permission to develop the building for use as a training centre was refused in September 2004, on the grounds that the development would be unsustainable and would affect local use of the area due to parking requirements. During this period it was however sometimes used for social functions.

In 2011 the house was placed on the market again, and this time was bought by Lara Grylls, the sister of Bear Grylls, and her husband James Fawcett, great-grandson of its previous owner in the 1920s. The couple demolished the extension that had been added by the CEGB to the back of the building (dubbed by them "the tumour"), which had included office buildings, control centres, bunkers and a tower, amounting to four times the size of the original house in all. The demolition process turned out to be self-financing, due to the value of the electrical scrap that was recovered, and even generated a small surplus, which paid for the reinstatement of period windows and chimneys.

== Pollution levels ==
During 2000, Becca Hall was used to measure background levels of air pollution. The site's rural nature places it 1.2 miles (2 km) due west from the A1 and over 3.5 miles (6 km) due east from the edge of the Leeds urban boundary, and so was ideal for that purpose. The only pollutant recorded was ground-level ozone, compared to levels of SO_{2}, NO_{2}, and PM_{10}s at a site next to the A1.
