= James Goold, Baron Goold =

Scottish businessman and Conservative politician

James Duncan Goold, Baron Goold (7 February 1923 – 27 July 1997) was a Scottish businessman and Conservative politician.

Educated at the Glasgow Academy, Goold was a chartered accountant. He was the honorary treasurer of the Scottish Conservative Party between 1981 and 1983, and its chairman from 1983 to 1990.

Goold was knighted in 1983. On 8 April 1987, he was created a life peer, as Baron Goold, of Waterfoot in the District of Eastwood. He was deputy lieutenant of Renfrewshire from 1985 to 1994 and Lord Lieutenant of Renfrewshire from 1994 to 1997.
