= Henry Bruce, 1st Baron Aberdare =

British politician (1815–1895)

The Right Honourable The Lord Aberdare GCB PC JP DL FRS FRHistS
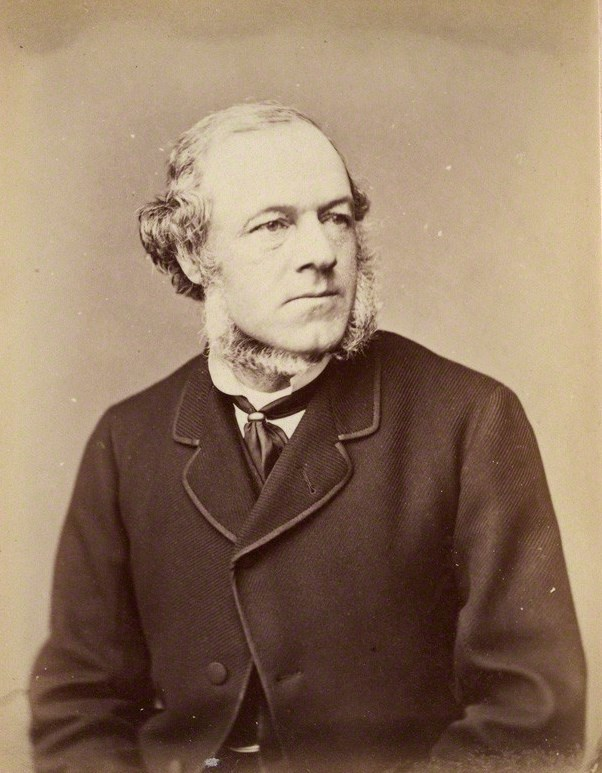

Lord President of the Council
- In office 9 August 1873 – 21 February 1874
- Monarch: Queen Victoria
- Prime Minister: William Ewart Gladstone
- Preceded by: The Earl de Grey and Ripon
- Succeeded by: The Duke of Richmond

Home Secretary
- In office 9 December 1868 – 9 August 1873
- Monarch: Queen Victoria
- Prime Minister: William Ewart Gladstone
- Preceded by: Gathorne Hardy
- Succeeded by: Robert Lowe

Vice-President of the Committee of the Council on Education
- In office 26 April 1864 – 26 June 1866
- Monarch: Queen Victoria
- Prime Minister: The Viscount Palmerston; The Earl Russel
- Preceded by: Robert Lowe
- Succeeded by: Henry Lowry-Corry

Parliamentary Under-Secretary of state for Home Affairs
- In office 14 November 1862 – 25 April 1864
- Monarch: Queen Victoria
- Prime Minister: The Viscount Palmerston
- Preceded by: George Clive
- Succeeded by: Thomas Baring
Parliamentary offices
Member of the House of Lords Lord Temporal
In office 23 August 1873 – 25 February 1895; Hereditary peerage
Preceded by	Peerage created
Succeeded by	The 2nd Lord Aberdare
Member of Parliament for Renfrewshire
In office 25 January 1869 – 23 August 1873
Preceded by	Archibald Alexander Speirs
Succeeded by	Archibald Campbell
Member of Parliament for Merthyr Tydfil
In office 14 December 1852 – 11 November 1868
Preceded by	Sir John Josiah Guest
Succeeded by	Henry Richard

Personal details
- Born: Henry Austin Bruce; 16 April 1815 Aberdare, Glamorganshire
- Died: 25 February 1895 (aged 79) South Kensington, London
- Resting place: Aberffrwd Cemetery, Mountain Ash
- Party: Liberal
- Spouses: Annabella Beadon (m. 1846; died 1852) Norah Napier (m. 1854)
- Education: Swansea Grammar School
- Alma mater: Lincoln's Inn

Henry Austin Bruce, 1st Baron Aberdare (16 April 1815 – 25 February 1895), was a British Liberal Party politician, who served in government most notably as Home Secretary (1868–1873) and as Lord President of the Council.

== Origin ==
Lord Aberdare was born at Duffryn, Aberdare, Glamorganshire, the second son of John Bruce Bruce-Pryce (born John Bruce Knight), a Royal Navy agent and banker, and his first wife, Sarah, daughter of Rev. Hugh Williams Austin.

Aberdare's father was the eldest son of John Knight (died 1799) and Margaret Bruce (died 1809), daughter and heiress of William Bruce of Llanblethian, High Sheriff of Glamorganshire. His younger brother was James Knight-Bruce. Aberdare's paternal grandmother, Margaret Bruce, came from the Welsh Bruces, a branch of Bruce of Kennet of Clackmannan, that dates to the 14th century.

In 1805, Aberdare's father changed his surname from Knight to Bruce when he reached the age of majority and inherited the Llanblethian estates. In 1837, he changed his name again to Bruce-Pryce when he inherited Duffryn and the Monknash estates from a distant cousin, Frances Anne Grey (née Pryce), the daughter and heiress of Thomas Pryce, who had married Hon. William Booth Grey (1773-1852), the second son of 5th Earl of Stamford.

Lord Aberdare's younger brother was Gen. Robert Bruce (1821–1891).

== Education ==
Henry Bruce was educated from the age of twelve at the Bishop Gore School, Swansea (Swansea Grammar School). In 1837 he was called to the bar from Lincoln's Inn. Shortly after he had begun to practice, the discovery of coal beneath the Duffryn and other Aberdare Valley estates brought his family great wealth. From 1847 to 1854 Bruce was stipendiary magistrate for Merthyr Tydfil and Aberdare, resigning the position in the latter year, after entering parliament as Liberal member for Merthyr Tydfil.

== Industrialist and politician, 1852–1868 ==
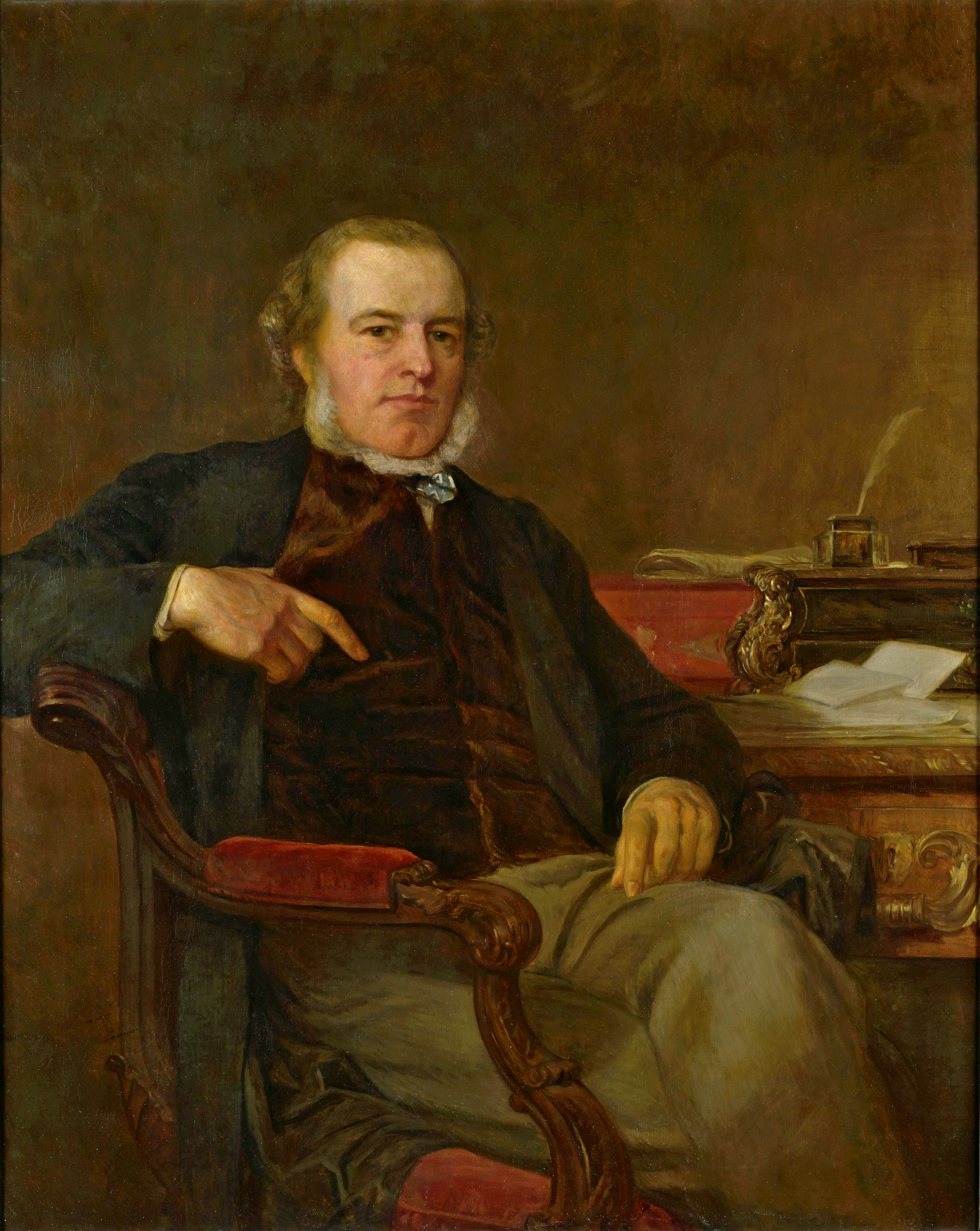
Lord Aberdare, portrait after Henry Tanworth Wells.

Bruce was returned unopposed as MP for Merthyr Tydfil in December 1852, following the death of Sir John Guest. He did so with the enthusiastic support of the late member's political allies, notably the iron masters of Dowlais, and he was thereafter regarded by his political opponents, most notably in the Aberdare Valley, as their nominee. Even so, Bruce's parliamentary record demonstrated support for liberal policies, with the exception of the ballot. The electorate in the constituency at this time remained relatively small, excluding the vast majority of the working classes.

Significantly, however, Bruce's relationship with the miners of the Aberdare Valley, in particular, deteriorated as a result of the Aberdare Strike of 1857–58. In a speech to a large audience of miners at the Aberdare Market Hall, Bruce sought to strike a conciliatory tone in persuading the miners to return to work. In a second speech, however, he delivered a broadside against the trade union movement generally, referring to the violence engendered elsewhere as a result of strikes and to alleged examples of intimidation and violence in the immediate locality. The strike damaged his reputation and may well have contributed to his eventual election defeat ten years later. In 1855, Bruce was appointed a trustee of the Dowlais Iron Company and played a role in the further development of the iron industry.

In November 1862, after nearly ten years in Parliament, he became Under-Secretary of State for the Home Department, and held that office until April 1864. He became a Privy Councillor and a Charity Commissioner for England and Wales in 1864, when he was moved to be vice-president of the Council of Education.

== 1868 general election ==
At the 1868 general election, Merthyr Tydfil became a two-member constituency with a much-increased electorate as a result of the Reform Act 1867. Since the formation of the constituency, Merthyr Tydfil had dominated representation as the vast majority of the electorate lived in the town and its vicinity, whereas there was a much lower number of electors in the neighbouring Aberdare Valley. During the 1850s and 1860s, however, the population of Aberdare grew rapidly, and the franchise changes in 1867 gave the vote to large numbers of miners in that valley. Amongst these new electors, Bruce remained unpopular as a result of his actions during the 1857–58 dispute. Initially, it appeared that the Aberdare iron master, Richard Fothergill, would be elected to the second seat alongside Bruce. However, the appearance of a third Liberal candidate, Henry Richard, a nonconformist radical popular in both Merthyr and Aberdare, left Bruce on the defensive and he was ultimately defeated, finishing in third place behind both Richard and Fothergill.

== Later political career ==
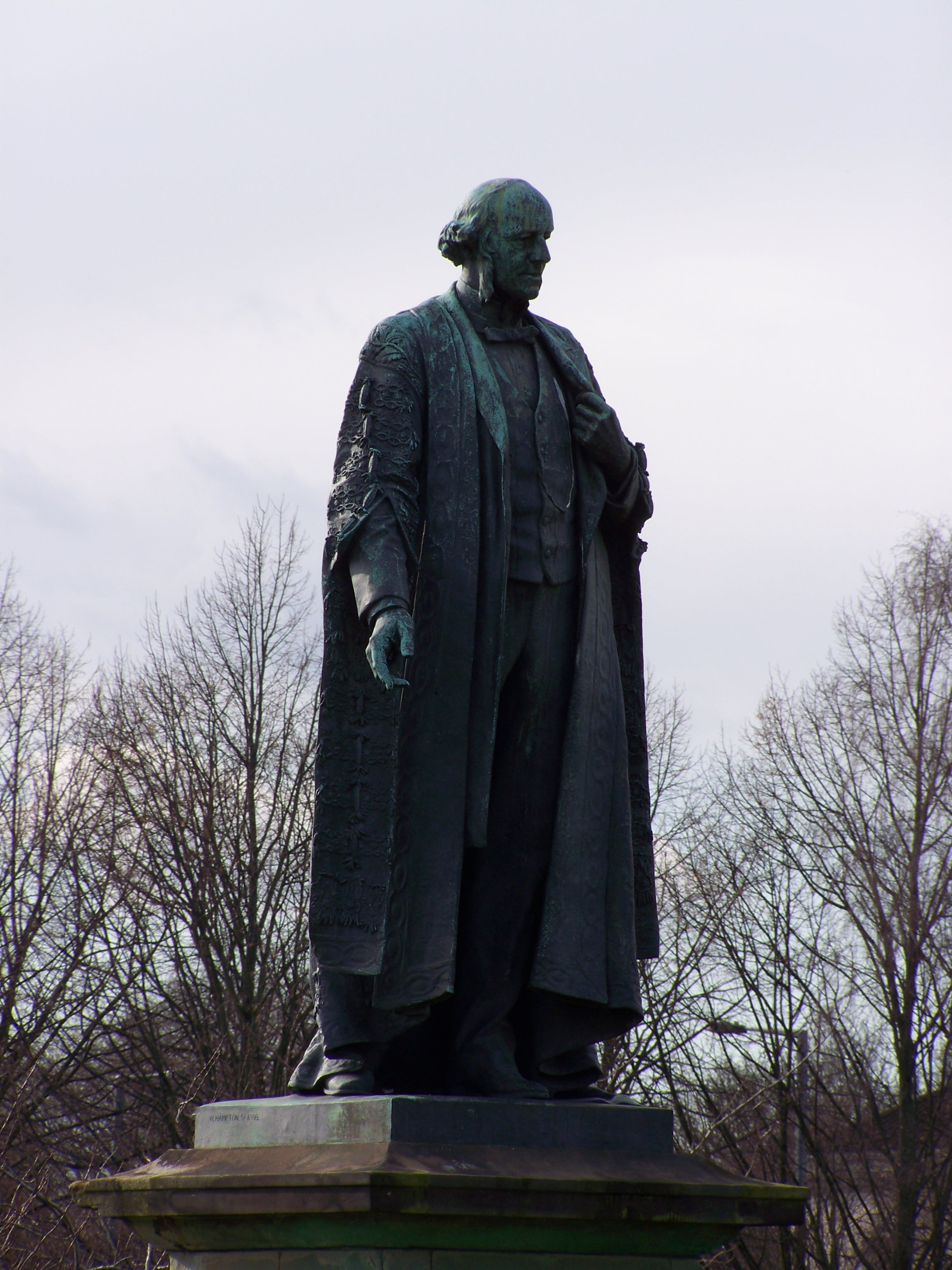
Statue overlooking the Main Building of Cardiff University

After losing his seat, Bruce was elected for Renfrewshire on 25 January 1869, and was made Home Secretary by William Ewart Gladstone. His tenure of this office was conspicuous for a reform of the licensing laws, and he was responsible for the Licensing Act 1872, which made the magistrates the licensing authority, increased the penalties for misconduct in public-houses and shortened the number of hours for the sale of drink. In 1873 Bruce relinquished the home secretaryship, at Gladstone's request, to become Lord President of the Council, and was elevated to the peerage as Baron Aberdare, of Duffryn in the County of Glamorgan, on 23 August that year. Being a Gladstonian Liberal, Aberdare had hoped for a much more radical proposal to keep existing licensee holders for a further ten years, and to prevent any new applicants. Its unpopularity pricked his nonconformist's conscience, when like Gladstone himself he had a strong leaning towards Temperance. He had already pursued 'moral improvement' on miners in the regulations attempting to further ban boys from the pits. The Trades Union Act 1871 was another more liberal regime giving further rights to unions, and protection from malicious prosecutions.

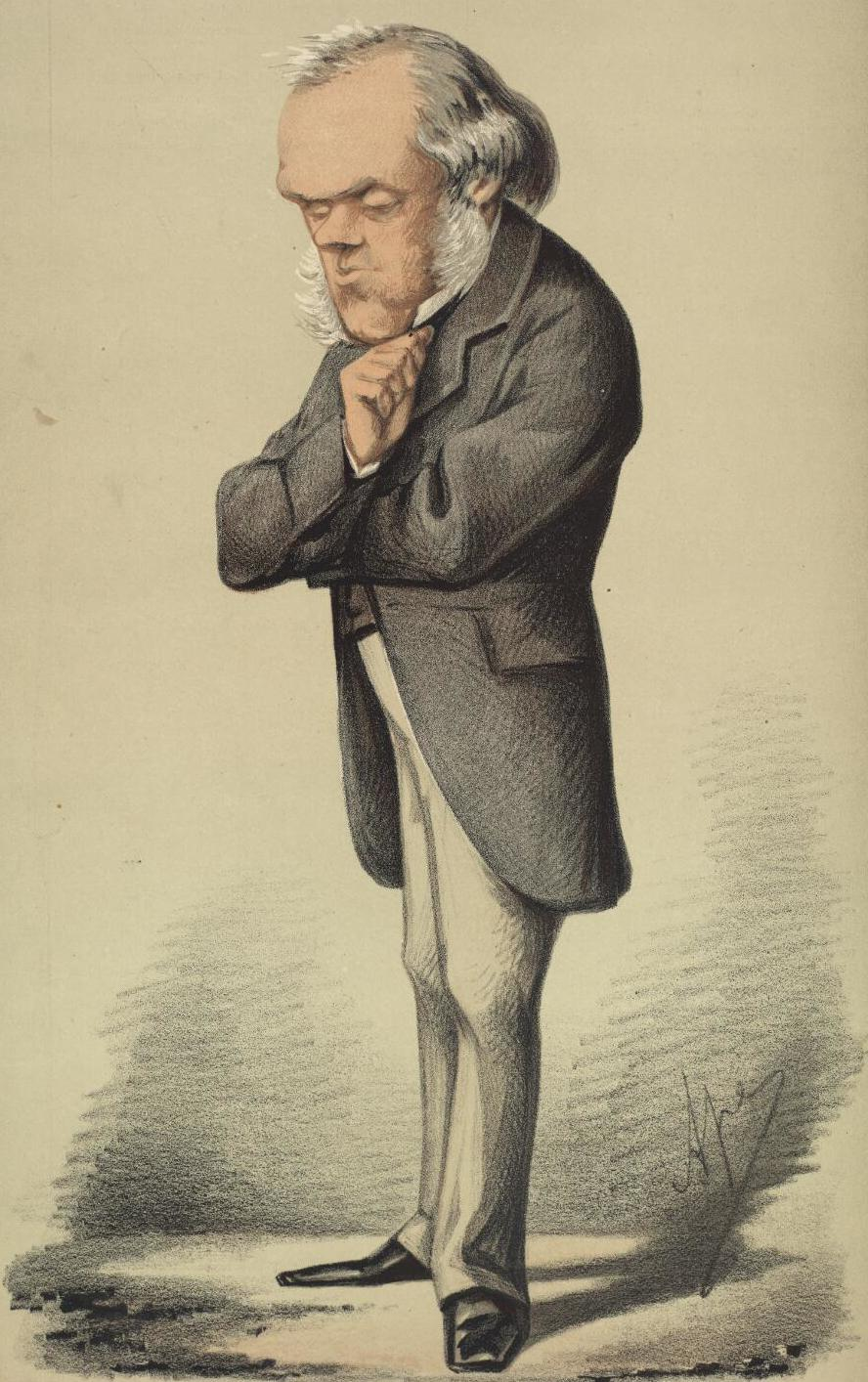
Caricature of Bruce by Carlo Pellegrini published in Vanity Fair in 1869 with the caption "He has gained credit by converting himself to the Ballot; he would gain greater credit by converting himself into an ex-secretary of State for the Home Department"

The defeat of the Liberal government in the following year terminated Lord Aberdare's official political life, and he subsequently devoted himself to social, educational and economic questions. Education became one of Lord Aberdare's main interests in later life. His interest had been shown by the speech on Welsh education which he had made on 5 May 1862. In 1880, he was appointed to chair the Departmental Committee on Intermediate and Higher Education in Wales and Monmouthshire, whose report ultimately led to the Welsh Intermediate Education Act 1889. The report also stimulated the campaign for the provision of university education in Wales. In 1883, Lord Aberdare was elected the first president of the University College of South Wales and Monmouthshire. In his inaugural address he declared that the framework of Welsh education would not be complete until there was a University of Wales. The university was eventually founded in 1893 and Aberdare became its first chancellor.

In 1876 he was elected a Fellow of the Royal Society; from 1878 to 1891 he was president of the Royal Historical Society. and in 1881 he became president of both the Royal Geographical Society and the Girls' Day School Trust. In 1888 he headed the commission that established the Official Table of Drops, listing how far a person of a particular weight should be dropped when hanged for a capital offence (the only method of 'judicial execution' in the United Kingdom at that time), to ensure an instant and painless death, by cleanly breaking the neck between the 2nd and 3rd vertebrae, an 'exacting science', eventually brought to perfection by Chief Executioner Albert Pierrepoint. Prisoners health, clothing and discipline was a particular concern even at the end of his career. In the Lords he spoke at some length to the Home Affairs Committee chaired by Arthur Balfour about the prison rules system. Aberdare had always expressed concern about intemperate working-classes; in 1878 urging greater vigilance against the vice of excessive drinking, he took evidence on miners and railway colliers drinking habits. The committee tried to establish special legislation based on a link between Sunday Opening and absenteeism established in 1868. Aberdare had been interested in the plight of working class drinkers since Gladstone had appointed him Home Secretary. The defeat of the Licensing Bill by the Tory 'beerage' and publicans was drafted to limit hours and protect the public, but it persuaded a convinced Anglican forever more of the iniquities.

In 1882 he began a connection with West Africa which lasted the rest of his life, by accepting the chairmanship of the National African Company, formed by Sir George Goldie, which in 1886 received a charter under the title of the Royal Niger Company and in 1899 was taken over by the British government, its territories being constituted the protectorate of Nigeria. West African affairs, however, by no means exhausted Lord Aberdare's energies, and it was principally through his efforts that a charter was in 1894 obtained for the University College of South Wales and Monmouthshire, a constituent institution of the University of Wales. This is now Cardiff University. Lord Aberdare, who in 1885 was made a Knight Grand Cross of the Order of the Bath, presided over several Royal Commissions at different times.

== Animal welfare ==
Bruce was President of the Royal Society for the Prevention of Cruelty to Animals from 1878 to 1893. In 1879, he voted against legislation proposing total abolition of vivisection which resulted in criticism from anti-vivisectionists. Bruce commented that the RSPCA had no position on vivisection and should be kept distinct from the Society. Anti-vivisectionist Frances Power Cobbe noted Bruce's contradictory behaviour, as he had publicly spoken against the abolition of vivisection and voted against it.

== Family ==
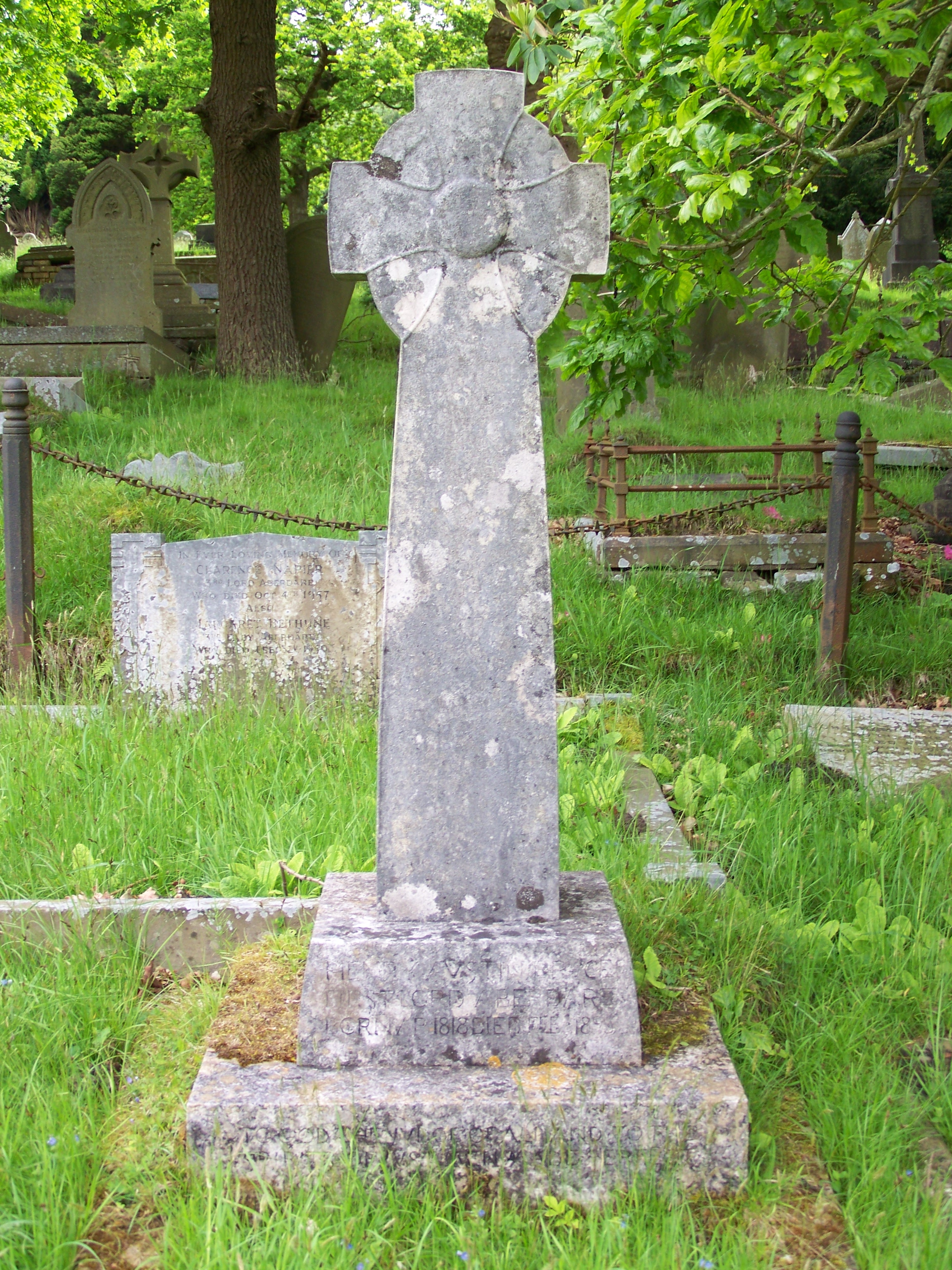
Henry Austin Bruce's grave at Aberffrwd cemetery in Mountain Ash, Wales.

Coats of Arms of Henry Bruce

Henry Bruce married firstly Annabella, daughter of Richard Beadon, of Clifton by Annabella à Court, sister of the 1st Baron Heytesbury, on 6 January 1846. They had one son and three daughters.

- Henry Campbell Bruce, 2nd Baron
- Margaret Cecilia married on 16 September 1889, Douglas Close Richmond, CB, MA, son of Rev. Henry Sylvester Richmond MA, rector of Wyck Rissington, Glos.
- Rachel Mary married 10 September 1872, Augustus George Vernon-Harcourt of St Clare, Ryde, Isle of Wight, son of Admiral Frederick Edward Vernon-Harcourt.
- Jessie Frances, married 3 September 1878, Rev John William Wynne-Jones, MA, rector of Llantrisant, Anglesey. son of John Wynne-Jones JP, DL, of Treiorworth, Bodedern, Holyhead, Anglesey.

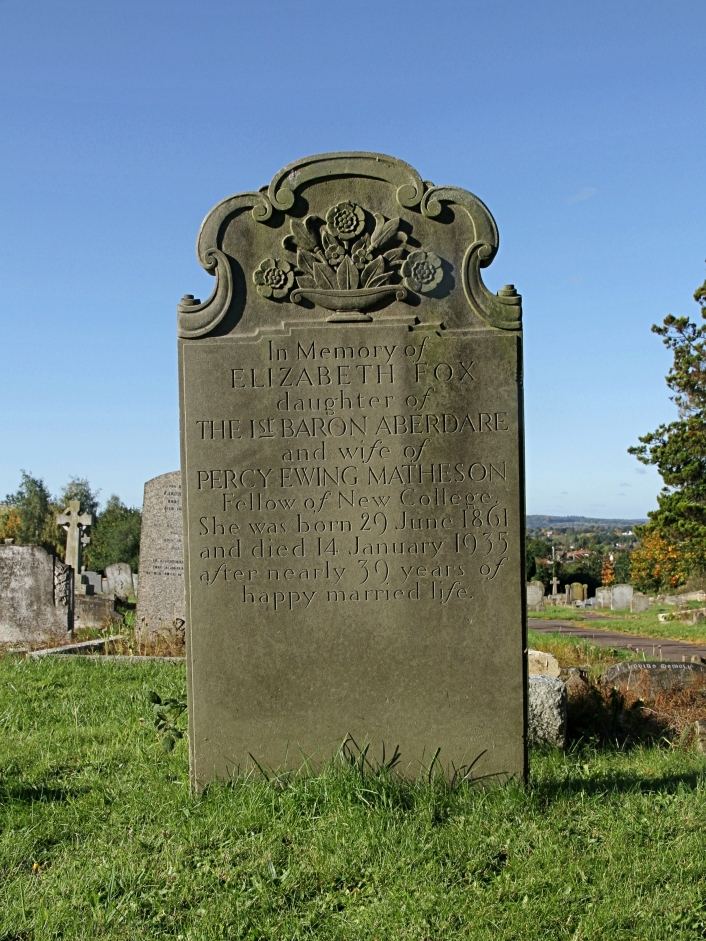
Headstone of Sarah Fox Matheson, née Bruce (1861–1935), in Headington Cemetery, Oxford

After her death on 28 July 1852 he married secondly on 17 August 1854 Norah Creina Blanche, youngest daughter of Lt-Gen Sir William Napier, KCB the historian of the Peninsular War, whose biography he edited, by Caroline Amelia, second daughter of Gen. Henry Edward Fox, son of the Earl of Ilchester. They had seven daughters and two sons, of whom:

- the youngest was the mountaineer Charles Granville Bruce.
- Alice Bruce took on her mother's ideas and took a leading role in women's education.
- Sarah married Montague Muir Mackenzie, barrister.
- Elizabeth Fox Bruce (1861–1935) married the author Percy Ewing Matheson.

Lord Aberdare died at his London home, 39 Princes Gardens, South Kensington, on 25 February 1895, aged 79, and was succeeded in the barony by his only son by his first marriage, Henry. He was survived by his wife, Lady Aberdare, born 1827, who died on 27 April 1897. She was a proponent of women's education and active in the establishment of Aberdare Hall in Cardiff.

== Memorial ==
Henry Austin Bruce is buried at Aberffrwd Cemetery in Mountain Ash, Wales. His large family plot is surrounded by a chain, and his gravestone is a simple Celtic cross with double plinth and kerb. In place is written "To God the Judge of all and to the spirits of just men more perfect."

== Bibliography ==
- Cooper, Thompson (1884). "Aberdare (Lord), Henry Austin Bruce" . Men of the Time (eleventh ed.). London: George Routledge & Sons. pp. 4–5.
- Jones, Ieuan Gwynedd (1964). "Dr. Thomas Price and the election of 1868 in Merthyr Tydfil : a study in nonconformist politics (Part One)" (PDF). Welsh History Review. 2 (2): 147–172.
- Jones, Ieuan Gwynedd (1965). "Dr Thomas Price and the election of 1868 in Merthyr Tydfil: a study in nonconformist politics (Part Two)". Welsh History Review. 2 (3): 251–70.
- "DEATH OF LORD ABERDARE.; The Career of a Distinguished Member of the Liberal Party". The New York Times. 26 February 1895. ISSN 0362-4331.

Parliament of the United Kingdom
Preceded by Sir Josiah Guest	Member of Parliament for Merthyr Tydfil; 1852–1868	Succeeded by Henry Richard
Preceded by Archibald Alexander Speirs	Member of Parliament for Renfrewshire; 1869–1873	Succeeded by Archibald Campbell
Political offices
Preceded by George Clive	Under-Secretary of State for the Home Department; 1862–1864	Succeeded by Thomas Baring
Preceded by Robert Lowe	Vice-President of the Committee on Education; 1864–1866	Succeeded by Henry Lowry-Corry
Preceded by Gathorne Hardy	Home Secretary; 1868–1873	Succeeded by Robert Lowe
Preceded by The Marquess of Ripon	Lord President of the Council; 1873–1874	Succeeded by The Duke of Richmond
Church of England titles
Preceded by Edward Pleydell Bouverie	Second Church Estates Commissioner; 1865–1866	Succeeded by John Robert Mowbray
Academic offices
New title	President of the University College of Wales Aberystwyth; 1874–1895	Succeeded by The Lord Rendel
Preceded by The Earl Russell	President of the Royal Historical Society; 1878–1891	Succeeded by M. E. Grant Duff
Peerage of the United Kingdom
New creation	Baron Aberdare; 1873–1895	Succeeded by Henry Bruce
