= Renfrewshire (UK Parliament constituency) =

Parliamentary constituency in the United Kingdom, 1801–1885

- Former county constituency for the House of Commons
- Subdivision: Renfrewshire

1708–1885
- Seats: One
- Replaced by: Renfrewshire East; Renfrewshire West

Renfrewshire was a county constituency of the House of Commons of the Parliament of Great Britain from 1708 until 1801 and of the Parliament of the United Kingdom from 1801 to 1885.

== Creation ==
The British parliamentary constituency was created in 1708 following the Acts of Union, 1707 and replaced the former Parliament of Scotland shire constituency of Renfrewshire.

== Boundaries ==
The constituency covered the county of Renfrewshire, minus the parliamentary burgh of Renfrew throughout the 1708 to 1885 period, and minus the parliamentary burgh of Port Glasgow and the Paisley and Greenock constituencies from 1832 to 1885.

The burgh of Renfrew was a component of Glasgow Burghs until 1832, when it became a component of Kilmarnock Burghs. Port Glasgow became a parliamentary burgh in 1832, and another component of Kilmarnock Burghs.

== History ==
The constituency elected one Member of Parliament (MP) by the first past the post system until the seat was abolished in 1885.

In 1885 the Renfrewshire constituency area was divided into two new constituencies: Renfrewshire Eastern and Renfrewshire Western.

== Members of Parliament ==
Election	Member	Party
1708	Sir John Shaw	Whig
1710	Sir Robert Pollock	
1722	Thomas Cochrane	
1727	Sir John Shaw	Whig
1734	Alexander Cunninghame	
1742 by-election	William Mure	
1761	Patrick Craufurd	
1768	William McDowall	
1774	John Craufurd	
1780	John Shaw-Stewart	
1783 by-election	William McDowall	
1786 by-election	John Shaw-Stewart	
1796	Boyd Alexander	
1802	William McDowall	
1810 by-election	Archibald Speirs	
1818	John Maxwell	Whig
1830	Sir Michael Shaw-Stewart, 6th Baronet	Whig
1837 by-election	George Houstoun	Conservative
1841	Patrick Maxwell Stewart	Whig
1846 by-election	William Mure	Conservative
1855 by-election	Sir Michael Shaw-Stewart, 7th Baronet	Conservative
1865	Archibald Alexander Speirs	Liberal
1869 by-election	Henry Bruce	Liberal
1873 by-election	Archibald Campbell	Conservative
1874	William Mure	Liberal
1880 by-election	Alexander Crum	Liberal

== Election results ==
=== Elections in the 1830s ===
General election 1830: Renfrewshire
Party	Candidate	Votes	%
Whig	Michael Shaw-Stewart	Unopposed	
Registered electors		143	
Whig hold			

General election 1831: Renfrewshire
Party	Candidate	Votes	%
Whig	Michael Shaw-Stewart	Unopposed	
Registered electors		143	
Whig hold			

General election 1832: Renfrewshire
Party	Candidate	Votes	%
Whig	Michael Shaw-Stewart	700	62.9
Radical	Robert Cunninghame Bontine	412	37.1
Majority		288	25.8
Turnout		1,112	82.6
Registered electors		1,347	
Whig hold			

General election 1835: Renfrewshire
Party	Candidate	Votes	%	±%
Whig	Michael Shaw-Stewart	528	43.3	−19.6
Conservative	George Houstoun	460	37.8	New
Radical	William Dixon	230	18.9	−18.2
Majority		68	5.5	−20.3
Turnout		1,218	82.3	−0.3
Registered electors		1,480		
Whig hold		Swing	−0.7	

Shaw-Stewart's death caused a by-election.

By-election, 30 January 1837: Renfrewshire
Party	Candidate	Votes	%	±%
Conservative	George Houstoun	811	56.0	+18.2
Whig	John Maxwell	637	44.0	+0.7
Majority		174	12.0	N/A
Turnout		1,448	73.2	−9.1
Registered electors		1,979		
Conservative gain from Whig		Swing	+8.8	

General election 1837: Renfrewshire
Party	Candidate	Votes	%	±%
Conservative	George Houstoun	821	53.8	+16.0
Whig	Houston Stewart	704	46.2	+2.9
Majority		117	7.6	N/A
Turnout		1,525	77.1	−5.2
Registered electors		1,979		
Conservative gain from Whig		Swing	+6.6	

=== Elections in the 1840s ===
General election 1841: Renfrewshire
Party	Candidate	Votes	%	±%
Whig	Patrick Maxwell Stewart	959	50.4	+4.2
Conservative	William Mure	945	49.6	−4.2
Majority		14	0.8	N/A
Turnout		1,904	83.2	+6.1
Registered electors		2,289		
Whig gain from Conservative		Swing	+4.2	

Stewart's death caused a by-election.

By-election, 9 December 1846: Renfrewshire
Party	Candidate	Votes	%	±%
Conservative	William Mure	Unopposed		
Conservative gain from Whig				

General election 1847: Renfrewshire
Party	Candidate	Votes	%	±%
Conservative	William Mure	Unopposed		
Registered electors		2,306		
Conservative gain from Whig				

=== Elections in the 1850s ===
General election 1852: Renfrewshire
Party	Candidate	Votes	%	±%
Conservative	William Mure	Unopposed		
Registered electors		2,450		
Conservative hold				

Mure resigned by accepting the office of Steward of the Chiltern Hundreds, causing a by-election.

By-election, 14 May 1855: Renfrewshire
Party	Candidate	Votes	%	±%
Conservative	Michael Shaw-Stewart	Unopposed		
Conservative hold				

General election 1857: Renfrewshire
Party	Candidate	Votes	%	±%
Conservative	Michael Shaw-Stewart	Unopposed		
Registered electors		2,649		
Conservative hold				

General election 1859: Renfrewshire
Party	Candidate	Votes	%	±%
Conservative	Michael Shaw-Stewart	Unopposed		
Registered electors		2,877		
Conservative hold				

=== Elections in the 1860s ===
General election 1865: Renfrewshire
Party	Candidate	Votes	%	±%
Liberal	Archibald Alexander Speirs	938	52.9	New
Conservative	Michael Shaw-Stewart	836	47.1	N/A
Majority		102	5.8	N/A
Turnout		1,774	77.9	N/A
Registered electors		2,276		
Liberal gain from Conservative		Swing	N/A	

General election 1868: Renfrewshire
Party	Candidate	Votes	%	±%
Liberal	Archibald Alexander Speirs	Unopposed		
Registered electors		3,571		
Liberal hold				

Speirs' death caused a by-election.

By-election, 25 January 1869: Renfrewshire
Party	Candidate	Votes	%	±%
Liberal	Henry Bruce	Unopposed		
Liberal hold				

=== Elections in the 1870s ===
Bruce was elevated to the peerage, becoming Lord Aberdare and causing a by-election.

By-election, 13 Sep 1873: Renfrewshire
Party	Candidate	Votes	%	±%
Conservative	Archibald Campbell	1,855	52.5	New
Liberal	William Mure	1,677	47.5	N/A
Majority		178	5.0	N/A
Turnout		3,532	80.5	N/A
Registered electors		4,385		
Conservative gain from Liberal		Swing	N/A	

General election 1874: Renfrewshire
Party	Candidate	Votes	%	±%
Liberal	William Mure	1,991	51.1	N/A
Conservative	Archibald Campbell	1,903	48.9	N/A
Majority		88	2.2	N/A
Turnout		3,894	85.2	N/A
Registered electors		4,572		
Liberal hold		Swing	N/A	

=== Elections in the 1880s ===
General election 1880: Renfrewshire
Party	Candidate	Votes	%	±%
Liberal	William Mure	2,815	54.6	+3.5
Conservative	Archibald Campbell	2,341	45.4	−3.5
Majority		474	9.2	+7.0
Turnout		5,156	85.4	+0.2
Registered electors		6,038		
Liberal hold		Swing	+3.5	

Mure's death caused a by-election.

By-election, 30 Nov 1880: Renfrewshire
Party	Candidate	Votes	%	±%
Liberal	Alexander Crum	Unopposed		
Liberal hold				

== Sources ==
- History of Parliament - constituencies
- Leigh Rayment's Historical List of MPs – Constituencies beginning with "R" (part 1)
