= Blythswood =

Blythswood may refer to:

== People ==
- Archibald Campbell of Blythswood (1763–1838), Scottish landowner and Member of Parliament
- Baron Blythswood
  - Archibald Campbell, 1st Baron Blythswood (1835–1908), Scottish soldier, scientist and Member of Parliament
  - Barrington Campbell, 3rd Baron Blythswood (1845–1918), British Army general
  - Archibald Campbell, 4th Baron Blythswood (1870–1929), British Army officer

== Places ==
- Blythswood Hill, area of Glasgow, Scotland
  - Blythswood Square, square in the Blythswood Hill area
  - Blythswood Court, a tower block housing complex close to Blythswood Hill
- Blythswood, Renfrew, an area of Renfrew, Scotland
  - Blythswood House, former neoclassical mansion in Renfrew (demolished 1935)
- Blythswood, South Africa, settlement in Eastern Cape

== Other ==
- Blythswood F.C., 19th-century football club based in Glasgow
- Blythswood Rifles, a unit of the British Army
