= Archibald Campbell =

Archibald Campbell may refer to:

== Peerage ==
- Archibald Campbell of Lochawe (died before 1394), Scottish peer
- Archibald Campbell, 2nd Earl of Argyll (died 1513), Lord Chancellor of Scotland
- Archibald Campbell, 4th Earl of Argyll (c. 1507–1558), Scottish nobleman and politician
- Archibald Campbell, 5th Earl of Argyll (1532/7–1573), Scottish politician
- Archibald Campbell, 7th Earl of Argyll (c. 1575–1638), Scottish politician and military leader
- Archibald Campbell, 1st Marquess of Argyll (1607–1661), Scottish nobleman, politician, and peer
- Archibald Campbell, 9th Earl of Argyll (1629–1685), Scottish peer
- Archibald Campbell, 1st Duke of Argyll (1658–1703), Scottish peer
- Archibald Campbell, 3rd Duke of Argyll (1682–1761), Scottish nobleman, politician, lawyer, businessman and soldier

== Politicians ==
- Archibald Campbell (Glasgow MP) (died 1838), of Blythswood, MP for Perth Burghs, 1818–1820, and Glasgow Burghs, 1806–1809 and 1820–1831
- Archibald Campbell (New York politician) (1779–1856), NY politician
- Archibald Campbell, 1st Baron Blythswood (1835–1908), Scottish Conservative politician, MP for Renfrewshire
- Sir Archibald Campbell, 3rd Baronet (1825–1866), British politician, MP for Argyllshire, 1851–1857
- Archibald Campbell (Canadian politician) (1845–1913), Canadian member of parliament
- Archibald McIntyre Campbell (1851–1935), member of the Manitoba legislature
- Archibald Campbell (Australian politician) (1834–1903), New South Wales politician
- Archibald Campbell (Alberta politician) (1862–1943), member of the Alberta legislature
- Archibald Campbell (Wisconsin politician), member of the Wisconsin State Senate

== Military ==
- Sir Archibald Campbell, 1st Baronet (1769–1843), Scottish soldier and governor of New Brunswick
- Archibald Campbell (British Army officer, born 1739) (1739–1791), American Revolutionary War soldier
- Archibald Campbell (British Army officer, born 1774) (1774–1838), British Army major-general and lieutenant governor of Jersey
- Archibald Campbell, 4th Baron Blythswood (1870–1929), Scots Guards officer

== Others ==
- Archibald Campbell (philosopher) (1691–1756), Scottish moral philosopher
- Archibald Campbell (notary) (1790–1862), seigneur and notary in Lower Canada
- Archibald Campbell (doctor) (1805–1874), superintendent of Darjeeling sanitarium
- Archibald Campbell (died 1868) (1809–1868), seventeenth Laird of Mains
- Archibald Campbell (cricketer) (1822–1887), English cricketer
- Archibald Campbell (satirist) (fl. 1767), Scottish satirist
- Archibald Campbell (bishop) (died 1744), Scottish Episcopal bishop of Aberdeen
- Sir Archibald Campbell, 2nd Baronet (1769–1846), Scottish advocate and judge
- Archibald Campbell (abolitionist) (1833–1899), American lawyer, journalist, and abolitionist
- Archibald James Campbell (1853–1929), Australian ornithologist
- Archibald George Campbell (1880–1954), Australian ornithologist
- A. Y. G. Campbell (1872–1957), Indian civil servant
- A. Y. Campbell (1885–1958), classical scholar

== See also ==
- Archie Campbell (disambiguation)
