= St. Vincent Street =

Street in central Glasgow, Scotland

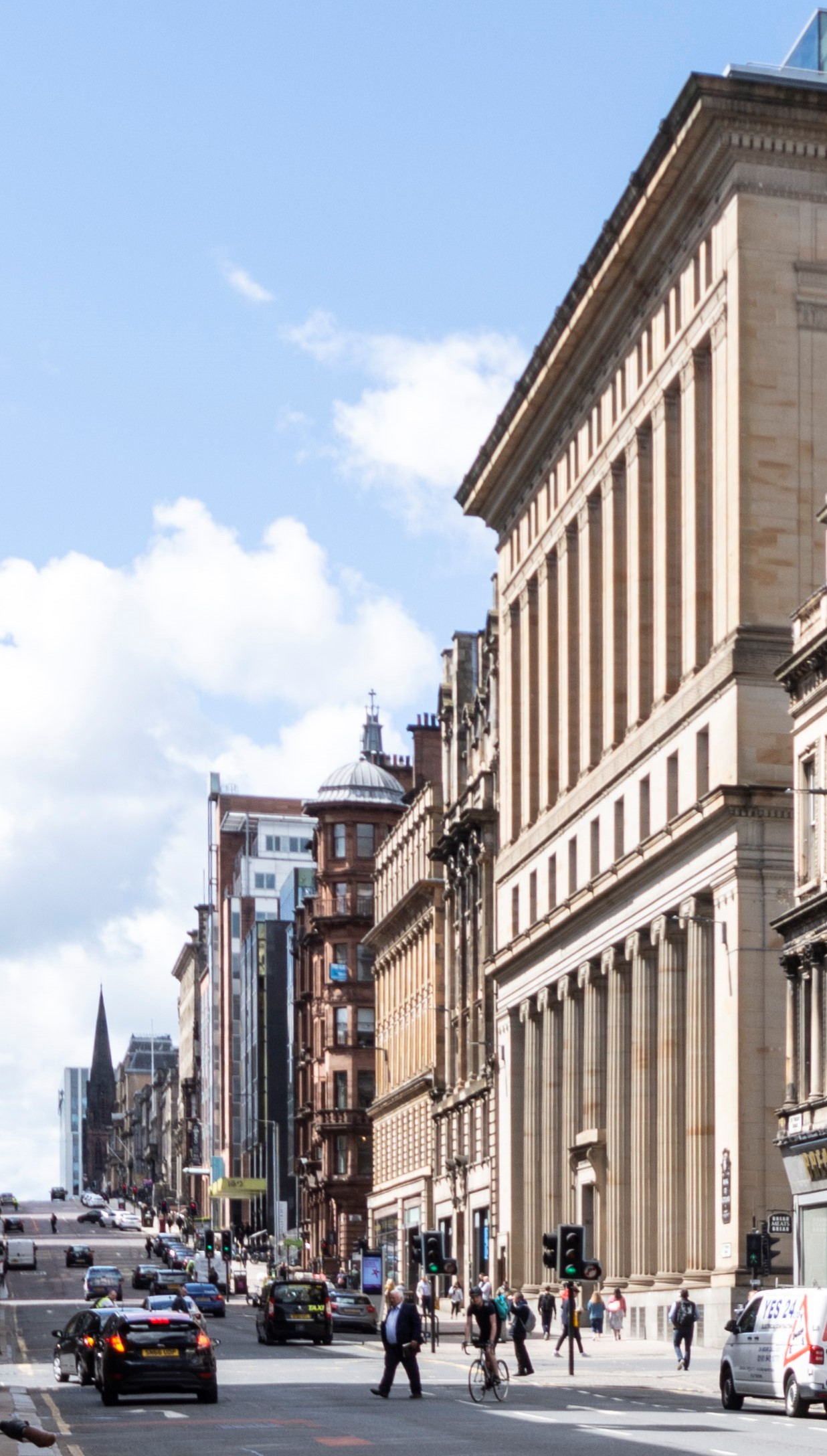
View west from West Nile Street

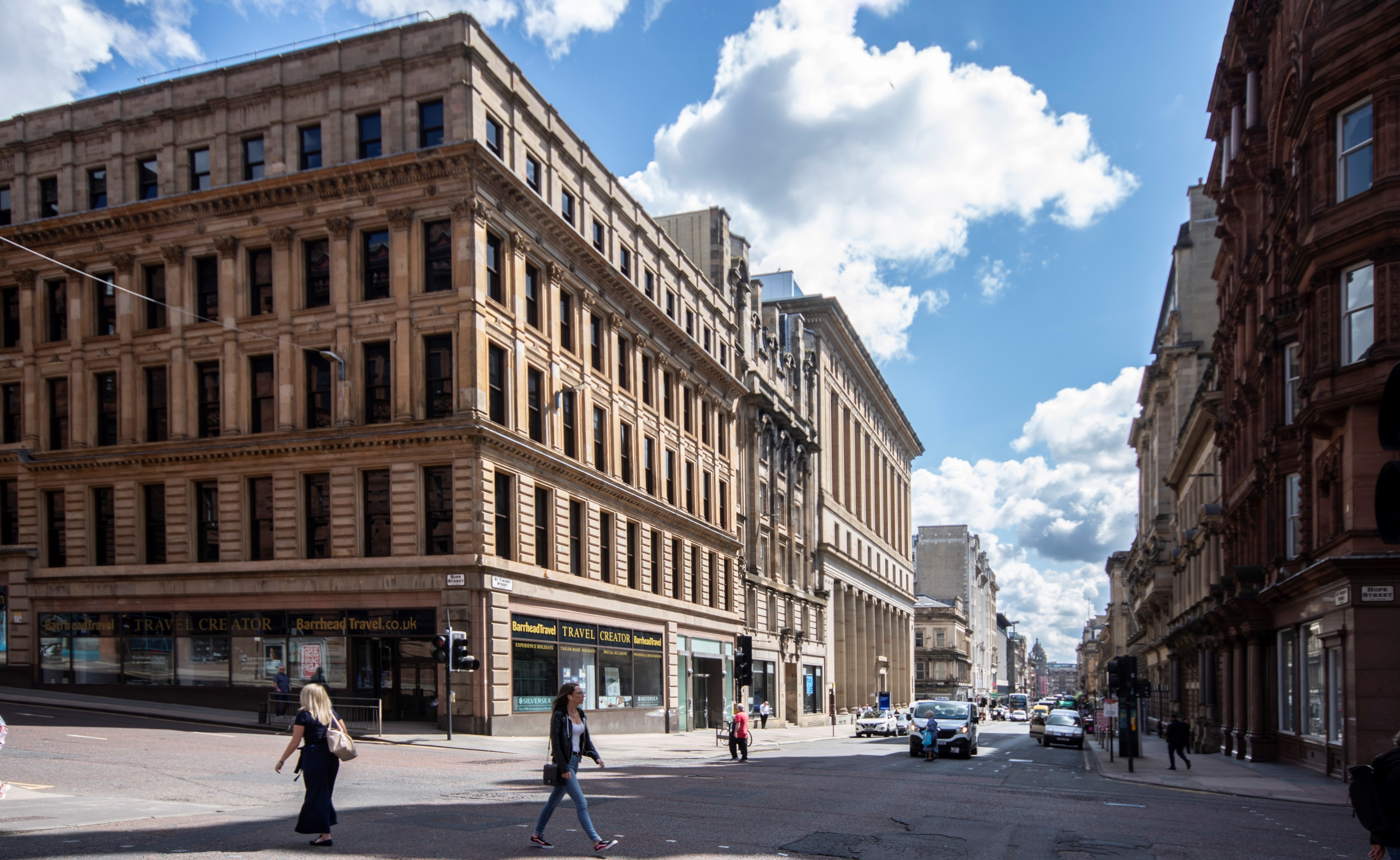
View east from Hope Street

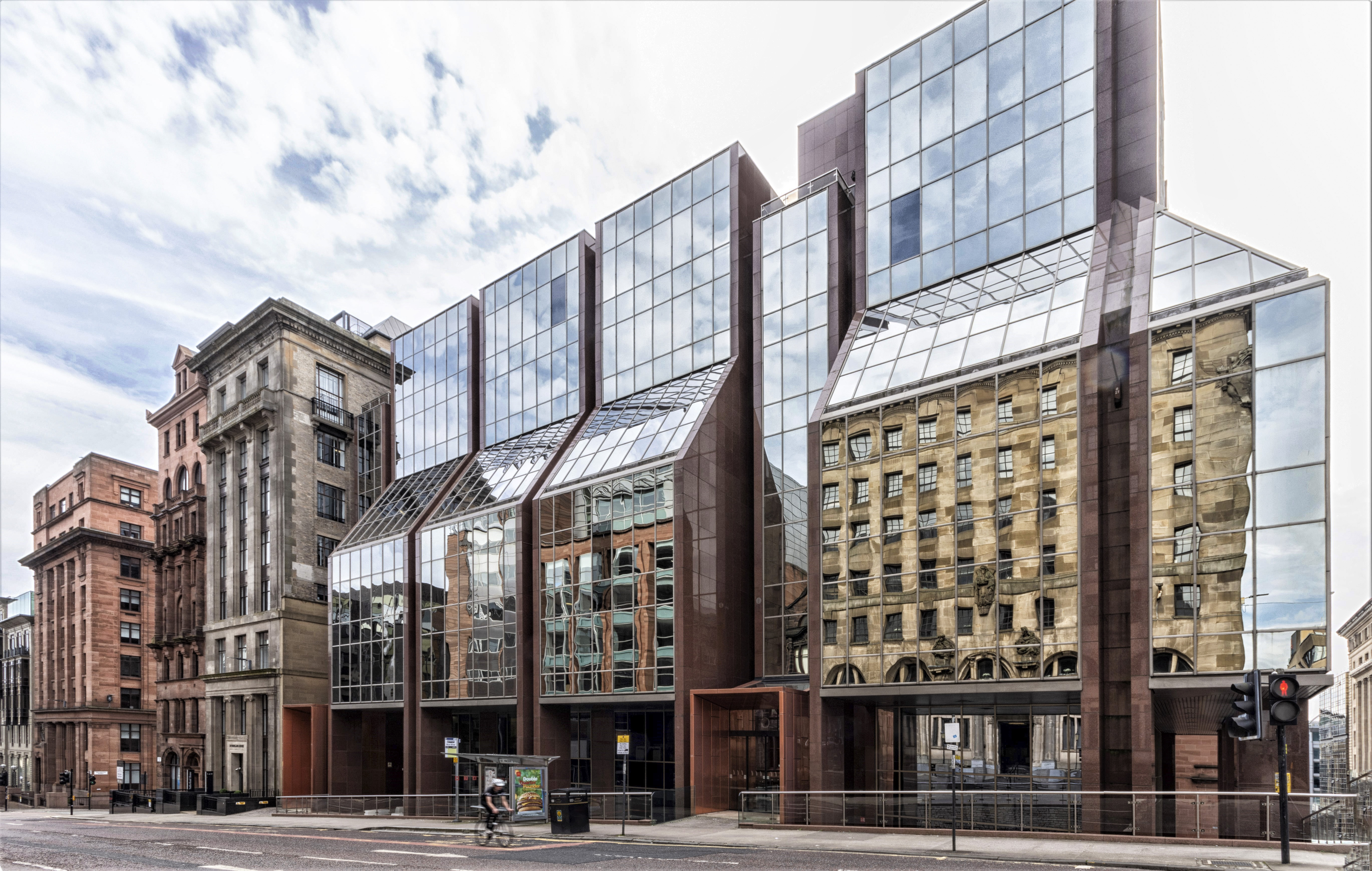
Office headquarter reflections

St. Vincent Street, is one of the major streets in the city centre of Glasgow, Scotland. It was formed in the early 1800s as part of the residential New Town of Blythswood developed by William Harley of Blythswood Square. St. Vincent Street was named to commemorate the victory of Sir John Jervis, on 15 February 1797, off Cape Saint Vincent, Portugal. when the Royal Navy defeated the Spanish fleet which was on its way to join Napoleon's French fleet. The first part of the street, from George Square to Buchanan St, containing numbers up to 41, is named St Vincent Place.

The street (which as part of the city centre one-way system carries westbound traffic only until the junction with Pitt Street) runs west from George Square and Buchanan Street rising up Blythswood Hill, and then descending across North Street until it meets Elliot Street at Finnieston / Sandyford close to Kelvingrove Park (St Vincent Street is the major road in the junction, which since 2018 has featured a statue of Charles Rennie Mackintosh, but the route continues westwards as Argyle Street from this point).

Its architectural style is the grandest of any city centre street with major innovations by architects of the 19th century through to the 21st. Of its many notable commercial headquarter buildings are those of the Clydesdale Bank, (Note: 30-40 St Vincent Place) British Linen Bank, Union Bank of Scotland, Scottish Mutual Life Assurance, Scottish Amicable Life Assurance, J& P Coats, Coats Viyella, and on the crest of the hill is the Royal College of Physicians and Surgeons of Glasgow. Beyond the College is St Vincent Street Church, and on the northside is St Columba's Gaelic Church. Close by are the sumptuous headquarters built for Britoil (now Santander) followed by the expanse of the Scottish Power headquarter towers.

Some examples are noted here: The Union Bank of Scotland, 110 St Vincent Street designed by architect James Miller; the North British & Mercantile Building, 200 St Vincent Street, designed by Sir John James Burnet; the Royal College of Physicians & Surgeons of Glasgow, 232-242 St Vincent Street, founded in 1599; and St Vincent Street Church, designed by Alexander 'Greek' Thomson).

In 2022, the street stood in for New York City during filming for Indiana Jones and the Dial of Destiny, which was released in 2023.
