= Garnethill =

Area of Glasgow, Scotland

Coordinates: 55.867149°N 4.267566°W

- Location within Glasgow
- OS grid reference: NS582661
- Council area: Glasgow City Council
- Lieutenancy area: Glasgow
- Country: Scotland
- Sovereign state: United Kingdom
- Post town: GLASGOW
- Postcode district: G3
- Dialling code: 0141
- Police: Scotland
- Fire: Scottish
- Ambulance: Scottish
- UK Parliament: Glasgow Central
- Scottish Parliament: Glasgow Kelvin

Garnethill is a predominantly residential area of the city of Glasgow, Scotland with a number of important public buildings.

== Geography ==
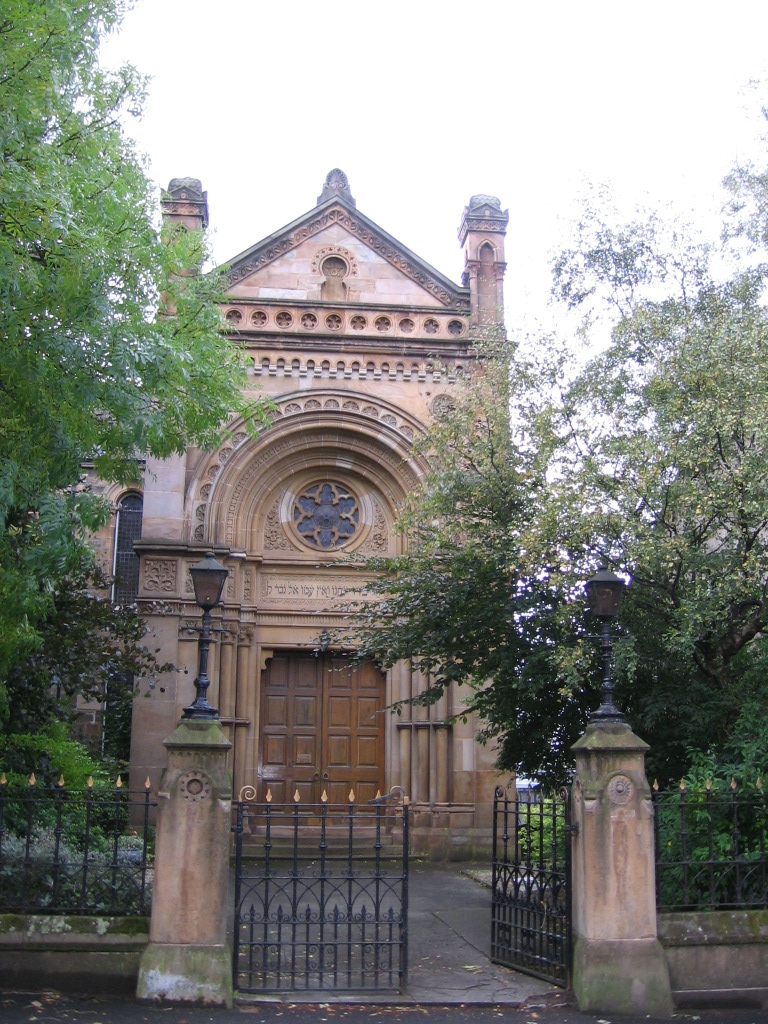
Garnethill Synagogue in Glasgow, Scotland

Located in the city centre, the area borders Cowcaddens to its north, Sauchiehall Street to its south, Cambridge Street to its east with the M8 motorway and Charing Cross forming its western boundary. The hill forms part of the historic Lands of Blythswood which the Douglas-Campbell families sold in stages from the late 18th century onwards, the largest purchaser/developer being William Harley of Blythswood Hill, cotton merchant and builder. Harley laid out Renfrew Street and encouraged the building of villas, which extended round into St George's Road. One major site was developed as Garnethill Observatory in 1810. Later developments included spacious tenements as families moved upward from the overcrowded Cowcaddens. Harley also laid out Blythswood Square.

The area was named Garnet Hill by William Harley, in honour of Professor Thomas Garnett, one of the first professors of Anderson's Institution, known today as Strathclyde University.

== Demography ==
Garnethill is ethnically diverse, with significant ethnically Scottish, Pakistani, Arab, Indian, Chinese and African populations.

== Sites ==
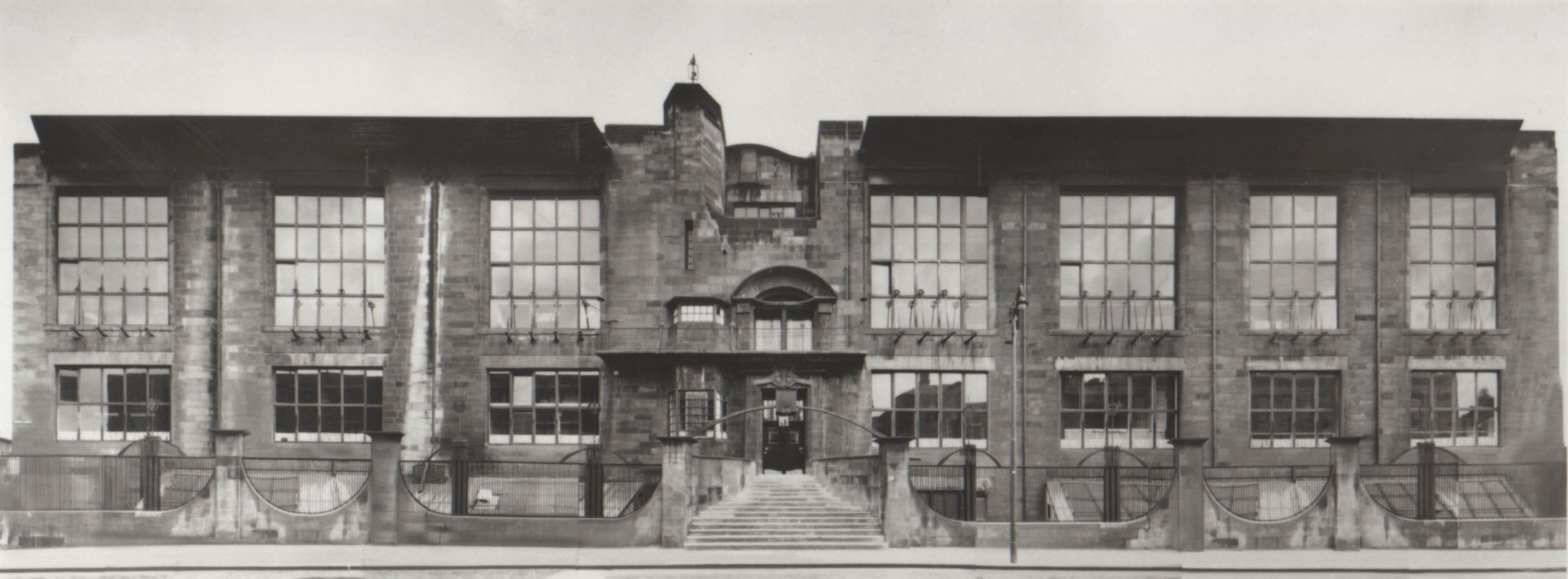
Postcard photo of Glasgow School of Art in the 1920s as designed by Charles Rennie Mackintosh

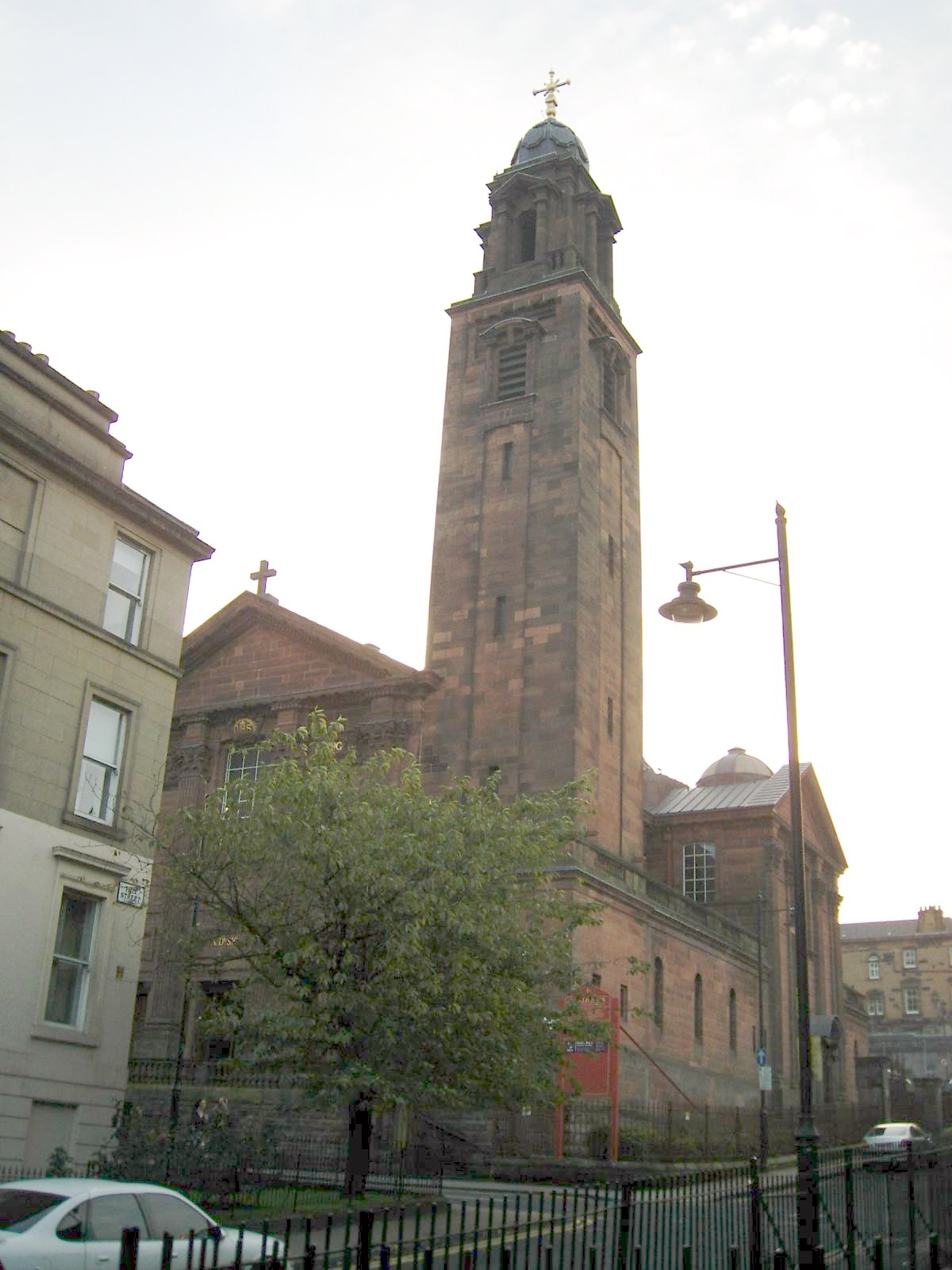
St. Aloysius Church in Garnethill.

The Glasgow School of Art, designed by Charles Rennie Mackintosh and the Glasgow Film Theatre are located in Garnethill. It is also the location of Scotland's oldest and first purpose-built synagogue Garnethill Synagogue, founded in 1879, and the Glasgow Dental Hospital and School. Garnethill is also home to St. Aloysius' RC Church, built in 1910.

== Schools ==
Garnetbank Primary School is situated on Renfrew Street opposite Renfrew Street Nursery School.

There is a private school, St Aloysius' College, whose Clavius building and Junior School both recently won architectural awards. St Aloysius' College also have a 4-storey sports complex on Dalhousie Street between Hill Street and Renfrew Street.

== Buildings ==
Garnethill is a conservation area and contains several listed buildings, most significantly Glasgow School of Art designed by Charles Rennie Macintosh. Housing listed includes Breadalbane Terrace built between 1845 - 1855 by Charles Wilson. Heritage buildings which are now apartments include the first Beatson Cancer Hospital, in Hill Street, and the Glasgow High School for Girls, in Buccleuch Street.

The rebuilding of the fire-damaged, and twice gutted, unique Mackintosh Building of Glasgow School of Art in Renfrew Street is awaited.

During the 1960s and 1970s, Garnethill became the principal centre of Scotland's Chinese community, with Cantonese speaking immigrants from Hong Kong settling in the area. Most had already settled in the UK, and moved north from England. As a result, the neighbourhood is home to Glasgow's Chinatown shopping mall on New City Road.

== Streets ==
Garnethill comprises the following streets:

- West Graham Street
- Buccleuch Street
- Hill Street, which was home to 4 of the last 15 Turner Prize winners
- Renfrew Street
- Garnet Street
- Garnethill Street
- Scott Street
- Dalhousie Street
- Rose Street
- New City Road
- Shamrock Street
- Cambridge Street

== In popular culture ==
Garnethill is the first and title volume of a trilogy of crime novels by Glaswegian author Denise Mina. All three books are predominantly set in and around Garnethill, Glasgow, and its environs.

== Notable people ==
- Thomas King, botanist, lived at 110 Hill Street
- Alumnus of Glasgow School of Art include Robbie Coltrane, Peter Capaldi, Scott Hutchison.
- Turner Prize winners who have lived on Hill Street, Garnethill- Douglas Gordon, Richard Wright, Simon Starling and Martin Boyce.
