= Nicholas Douglas =

Nicholas Douglas may refer to:

- Nick Douglas, American musician
- Nicholas Douglas (student athlete), see 2012 CARIFTA Games
- Nicholas Douglas, of the Douglases of Mains, Scotland
