= Baron Blythswood =

Title in the Peerage of the United Kingdom

Blythswood House, the seat of the Campbell family

Baron Blythswood, of Blythswood in the County of Renfrew, was a title in the Peerage of the United Kingdom. It was created on 24 August 1892 for Sir Archibald Campbell, 1st Baronet, the former Member of Parliament for Renfrew, with remainder failing heirs male of his own to five of his younger brothers and the heirs male of their bodies (one brother, Robert Douglas-Campbell, was excluded from inheriting the title).

Sir Archibald had already gained that style by being created a baronet (formally of Blythswood in the County of Renfrew, in the Baronetage of the United Kingdom) on 4 May 1880.

== Ancestry ==
Born Archibald Douglas, the first holder was the son of Archibald Douglas, 17th feudal Scots baron of Mains and 12th feudal baron of Blythswood, a patrilineal descendant of James Douglas (who had assumed by Royal licence the surname of Douglas in lieu of Campbell), son of John Campbell and Mary, daughter and heiress of John Douglas of Mains. However John himself was also landed as the son of Colin Campbell, 1st feudal Scots Baron of Blythswood and that estate passed to another branch of the family.

The British 1st Baron Blythswood's father was born Archibald Douglas but assumed his new patronymic on 1838 on inheriting the Blythswood estate on the death of his cousin, Archibald Campbell.

== Succession ==
Lord Blythswood was childless and on his death in 1908 the baronetcy became extinct. He was succeeded in the barony according to the special remainder by his younger brother Reverend Sholto Douglas. On becoming the next Lord Blythswood he too assumed by Royal licence the surname of Campbell in lieu of his patronymic. He was also childless and was succeeded by his younger brother Barrington Douglas-Campbell, the third Baron. He was a major-general in the British Army. He and his son had assumed the additional surname of Campbell by Royal licence in 1908 but on his succession to the barony in 1916 he assumed the surname of Campbell only by Royal licence. On his death the title passed to his eldest son, the fourth Baron. He was a brigade major in the British Army. As follows, on succeeding in the barony on the death of his father in 1918 he assumed by Royal licence the surname of Campbell only. He had no sons and was succeeded by his younger brother, the fifth Baron. He died unmarried and was succeeded by his younger brother, the sixth Baron. He assumed by Royal licence the surname of Douglas-Campbell in 1929 but on succeeding in the barony in 1937 he assumed the surname of Campbell only by Royal licence. The title became extinct on the early death of his son, the seventh Baron, in 1940 due to a car accident.

== Estates ==
The principal country mansionhouse was Blythswood House, near Inchinnan, built in 1821 to the palatial designs of James Gillespie Graham, replacing the older small mansion of Ranfield, or Renfield. The new house name reflected the vast Lands of Blythswood acquired from Glasgow Town Council in the 18th century on the north side of the Clyde, starting west of Buchanan Street, Glasgow, and reaching the River Kelvin. The Lands of Blythswood started to be feued by an ancestor in the late 1790s/early 1800s as the city's New Town of Blythswood including Blythswood Hill and Blythswood Square to William Harley and other developers. Blythswood House was demolished in 1935 and its lands became Renfrew Golf Club.

Northbar house in Inchinnan was one of a number of family seats for three hundred years from the 1690s to the 1990s.

Another family estate, Rosehall, Lanarkshire (later renamed Douglas Support by Margaret, Duchess of Douglas), was inherited by the 2nd Lord Blythswood in the 1860s, and saved by the local community in 2020.

The first baron, who served in Westminster's Houses of Parliament in the Commons as an MP and later as with subsequent generations in the Lords acquired the old manor house of Halliford in Shepperton which is where in the year of his death he has a large tablet monument in the church chancel by the Thames.

== Campbell baronets, of Blythswood (1880) ==
- Sir Archibald Campbell, 1st Baronet (1835–1908) (extinct on death of 1st Baron) (created Baron Blythswood in 1892)

== Barons Blythswood (1892) ==
- Archibald Campbell, 1st Baron Blythswood (1835–1908)
- Sholto Campbell, 2nd Baron Blythswood (1839–1916), brother of the above
- Maj Gen Barrington Bulkeley Campbell, 3rd Baron Blythswood (1845–1918), brother of the above
- Major Archibald Campbell, 4th Baron Blythswood (1870–1929) son of the above
- Barrington Sholto Douglas Campbell/Campbell, 5th Baron Blythswood (1877–1937) brother of the above
- Leopold Colin Henry Douglas Campbell/Campbell, 6th Baron Blythswood (1881–1940) brother of the above
- Philip Archibald Douglas Campbell/Campbell, 7th Baron Blythswood (1919–1940)

== Arms ==
Coat of arms of Baron Blythswood

Crest
1st a lymphad as in the arms (motto over — "Vincit Labor") 2nd an oak tree with a lock hanging upon one of the branches Proper (motto over — "Quae Serata Secura").
Escutcheon
Quarterly 1st and 4th grand quarters counterquartered 1st and 4th gyronny of eight Or and Sable each charged with a trefoil slipped and counterchanged 2nd and 3rd Argent a lymphad Sable 2nd and 3rd grand quarters Argent a fess chequy Gules and of the first between three mullets in chief Azure a human heart in base Proper.
Supporters
On the dexter a savage wreathed about the temples and loins with laurel and holding in the dexter hand a club resting on the exterior shoulder Proper around his neck a gold chain pendent therefrom an escutcheon Argent charged with a human heart Gules sinister a lion Gules gorged with a collar flory-counterflory Or and pendent therefrom an escutcheon Argent charged as the dexter supporter.

== Recognition ==
- The Campbell and Douglas families adopted the title "of Blythswood" after buying the vast historic Lands of Blythswood from earlier owners including the distinguished Elphinstone family, and Glasgow Town Council. The city central area of Blythswood, Blythswood Hill and Blythswood Square share the same origins. (This includes a former 1960s British Rail office block close to the square, remodelled as Blythswood House student accommodation for Glasgow School of Art.
- St Conan's Kirk designed by the 1st Lord Blythswood's young brother Walter Douglas Campbell continues in its original site at Loch Awe.
- Blythswood Shipbuilding Company Ltd, Scotstoun, Glasgow, operated from 1919 to 1964, when the yard was acquired by Yarrow & Co Ltd.
- The merchant convoy ship SS Baron Blythswood under chief officer William Simpson Ure was sunk by U-99 in 1940.

Baronetage of the United Kingdom
Preceded by Mowbray baronets	Campbell baronets of Blythswood; 4 May 1880	Succeeded by Meyrick baronets
