= Archie Campbell =

Archie Campbell may refer to:

- Archie Campbell (judge) (1942–2007), Canadian jurist
- Archie Campbell (politician) (1874–1955), New Zealand politician
- Archie Campbell (comedian) (1914–1987), American comedian
- Archie Campbell (baseball) (1903–1989), MLB player
- Archie Campbell (footballer, born 1880) (1880–1918), Scottish footballer
- Archie Campbell (footballer, born 1904) (1904–1980), English footballer
- Archie Campbell (footballer, born 1991), Scottish footballer

== See also ==
- Archie Campbell's Cove
- Archibald Campbell (disambiguation)
