= Archibald Campbell, 1st Baron Blythswood =

British politician (1835–1908)

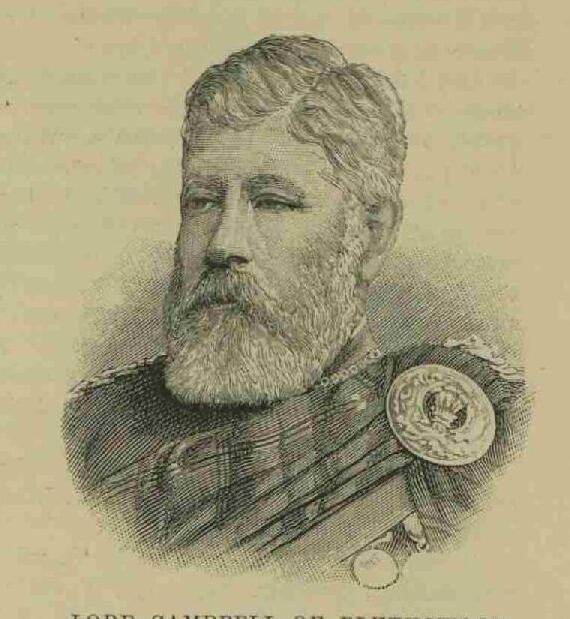
- Born: 22 February 1835; Florence
- Died: 8 July 1908 (aged 73); Renfrew
- Occupation: Politician, physicist
- Spouse(s): Augusta Clementina Carrington
- Parent(s): Archibald Campbell, 17th of Mains and 12th of Blythswood; Caroline Agnes Dick
- Position held: member of the 24th Parliament of the United Kingdom (1886–1892), member of the 23rd Parliament of the United Kingdom (1885–1886), member of the 20th Parliament of the United Kingdom (1873–1874)
- Rank: colonel
- Titles: Baron Blythswood (1, death, 1892–1908)

Lieutenant-Colonel Archibald Campbell, 1st Baron Blythswood, FRS (22 February 1835 – 8 July 1908) was a Scottish soldier, Tory politician, scientist and Grand Master of the Grand Lodge of Scotland.

== Life ==
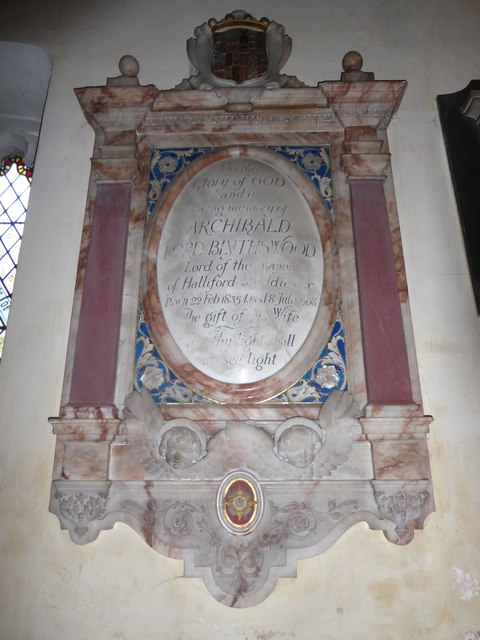
Memorial in St Nicholas, Shepperton, on which he is titled Lord of the Manor of Halliford, Middlesex.

Born Archibald Campbell Douglas (he dropped Douglas from his name in 1838) in Florence, Tuscany, he was the son of Archibald Campbell, 17th Laird of Mains, until 1838 known as Archibald Douglas.

Campbell joined the 79th Highlanders at the age of 16 and fought in the Crimean War in 1855, where he was severely wounded. He transferred to the Scots Fusilier Guards and rose to the rank of lieutenant-colonel. On 7 July 1864, he married Augusta Clementina Carrington, a daughter of Robert Carrington, 2nd Baron Carrington, at Whitehall Chapel, London. He retired from the army in 1868 on the death of his father.

He was Member of Parliament (MP) for Renfrewshire from 1873 to 1874, and for West Renfrewshire from 1885 to 1892. He was also Lord Lieutenant of Renfrewshire from 1904 to 1908. On 4 May 1880, he was created a baronet, of Blythswood and was an aide-de-camp to Queen Victoria. In 1888 he was awarded an honorary doctorate of Law from the University of Glasgow and made a Freeman of the City of Glasgow. He was conferred with Honorary Membership of the Institution of Engineers and Shipbuilders in Scotland in 1891. On 24 August 1892, he was created Baron Blythswood, with a special remainder to his five younger brothers.

He was a notable scientist and took his wife to Thebes to observe the Transit of Venus in 1874, taking with him a small transit instrument, a 6-inch telescope and a 12-inch telescope, recording the time of first contact, and also observed a white halo, proving an atmosphere around Venus. From 1892 to 1905 the Blythswood Laboratory at his family seat was used to experiment into many areas at the borders of physics, including the use of cathode rays, X-rays, spectroscopy and radioactivity. He designed a speed indicator, which was fitted to ships of the Royal Navy, and carried out studies into the efficiency of aerial propellers some years before the Wright Brothers' first powered flight in 1903. He was elected a Fellow of the Royal Society in May, 1907 and died possessed of the family seat in Renfrewshire and Halliford Manor in Shepperton.

He was for many years linked to the 3rd (The Blythswood) Volunteer Battalion of the Highland Light Infantry, where he was commanding Colonel, and from 28 May 1902 appointed Honorary Colonel.

He died at age 73 at his home Blythswood House, Renfrewshire, without issue and was buried on 11 July 1908 at Inchinnan. His baronetcy became extinct but his barony passed to his brother, Rev. Sholto Campbell, succeeded by younger brothers still, Barrington and Archibald.

== See also ==
- List of Fellows of the Royal Society

Parliament of the United Kingdom
Preceded by Henry Bruce	Member of Parliament for Renfrewshire; 1873–1874	Succeeded by William Mure
New constituency	Member of Parliament for West Renfrewshire; 1885–1892	Succeeded by Charles Bine Renshaw
Honorary titles
Preceded by Sir Michael Shaw-Stewart	Lord Lieutenant of Renfrewshire; 1904–1908	Succeeded by Thomas Glen Glen-Coats
Masonic offices
Preceded by The Earl of Mar	Grand Master of the Grand Lodge of Scotland; 1885–1892	Succeeded by The Earl of Haddington
Peerage of the United Kingdom
New creation	Baron Blythswood; 1892–1908	Succeeded by Sholto Campbell
Baronetage of the United Kingdom
New creation	Baronet (of Blythswood); 1880–1908	Extinct
