= Blythswood House =

Coordinates: 55.88843°N 4.402°W

- Blythswood House in 1870

General information
- Status: Demolished
- Location: Renfrew, Scotland
- Demolished: 1935

Design and construction
- Architect: James Gillespie Graham

Blythswood House was a 100-room neoclassical mansion at Renfrew, Scotland, built for the Douglas-Campbell family from the considerable incomes arising from their ownership of the Lands of Blythswood in Glasgow, including Blythswood Hill, developed initially by William Harley of Blythswood Square, and earlier lands surrounding Renfrew and Inchinnan.

It was designed in 1821, by the architect James Gillespie Graham for Archibald Campbell, the Member of Parliament for the Glasgow District of Burghs. On his death in 1838 it passed to his second cousin Archibald Douglas Campbell (died 1868) of the lineage of Douglas of Mains, who adopted the name of Campbell, a pre-requisite of Blythswood ownerships.

The house also contained a well-known laboratory that was used by Archibald Campbell, 1st Baron Blythswood from 1892 to 1905 to experiment into many areas at the borders of physics, including the use of cathode rays, X-rays, spectroscopy and radioactivity.

The house remained the seat of the Lords Blythswood until its demolition in 1935. Five years later the family title became extinct.
