= Robert Auld (British Army officer) =

British Army general

Major-General Robert Auld CB
- Born: 1 October 1848; Colombo, Ceylon
- Died: 17 February 1911 (aged 62); Guernsey, Channel Islands
- Military career
- Allegiance: United Kingdom
- Branch: British Army
- Service years: 1869–1911
- Rank: Major-General
- Conflicts: Second Boer War
- Awards: Companion of the Order of the Bath

Major-General Robert Auld CB (1 October 1848 – 17 February 1911) was a British Army officer who became Lieutenant Governor of Guernsey.

== Military career ==
Auld was commissioned into the 5th Regiment of Foot in 1869. He was appointed Aide-de-camp to the Governor of Malta in 1878, Deputy Assistant Quartermaster General at Headquarters Southern District in 1882 and Deputy Assistant Adjutant General at Headquarters Ireland in 1889. He went on to be Commander of the Mounted Infantry at Aldershot Command in 1892, Assistant Adjutant General at Headquarters North Western District in 1894 and Assistant Adjutant General at Headquarters Southern District in 1897. His next appointments were as Assistant Director General of Ordnance in 1899, Assistant Quartermaster General at Army Headquarters (War Office) later in 1899 and Deputy Quartermaster General at Army Headquarters on 7 April 1902. Finally he became Director of Supplies and Clothing in 1904, Commander of the Infantry Brigade at Gibraltar in 1905 and Lieutenant Governor of Guernsey in 1908.

He lived at Saumarez Park in Guernsey and died in office in 1911.

Government offices
Preceded by Barrington Campbell	Lieutenant Governor of Guernsey; 1908–1911	Succeeded by Sir Edward Hamilton
