= James Fillans =

Scottish sculptor, poet and artist

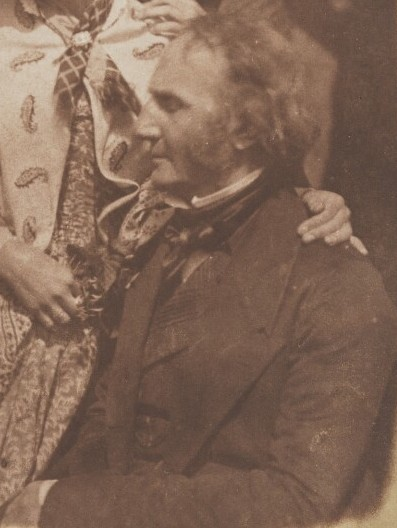
Photograph of Fillans by Hill and Adamson

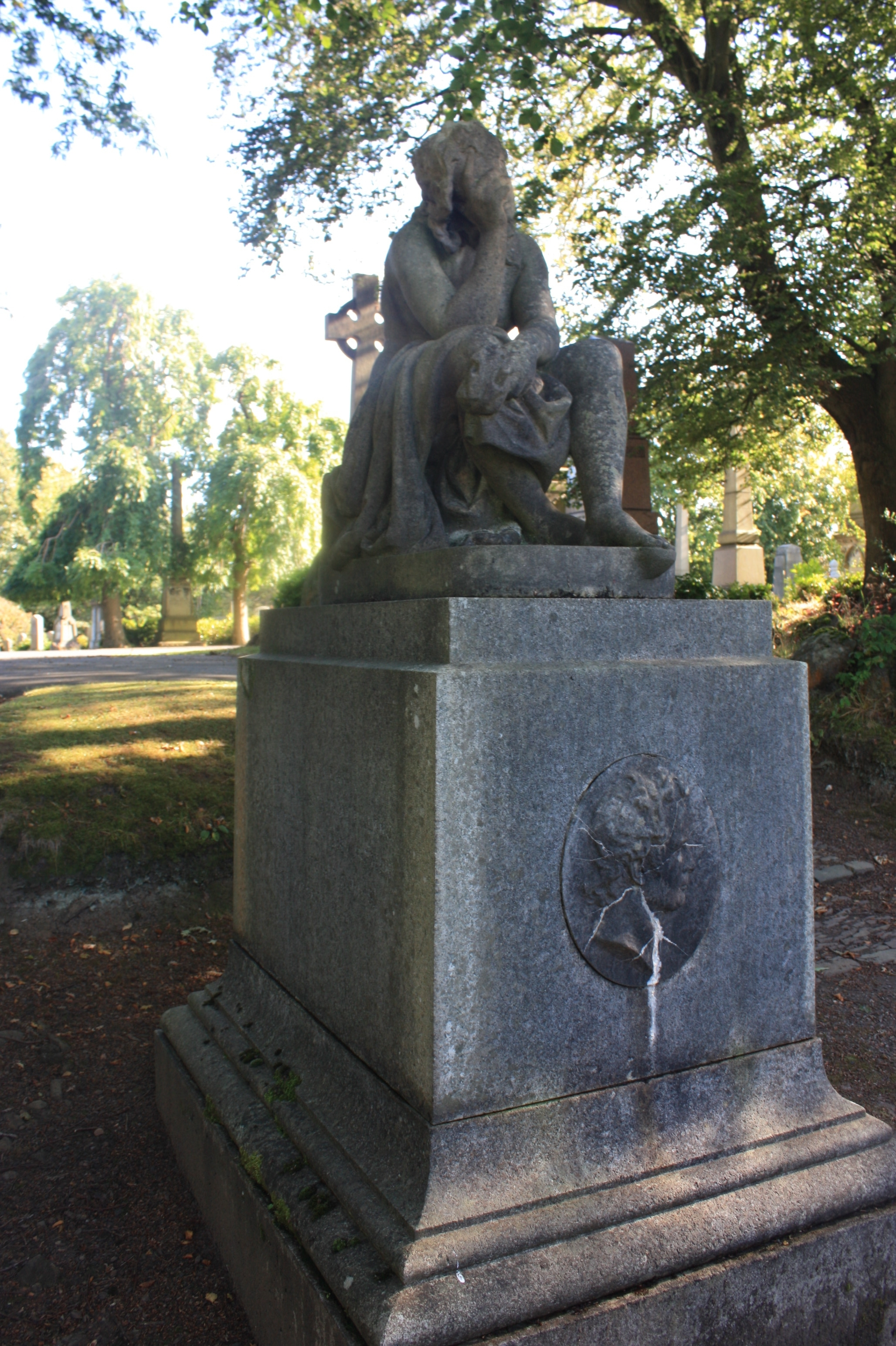
The grave of James Fillans, Woodside Cemetery, Paisley

James Fillans (27 March 1808 – 27 September 1852) was a Scottish sculptor, poet and artist with a short but influential career in the early 19th century.

== Life ==
Fillans was born in Wilsontown, Lanarkshire. In early life he worked as a handloom weaver, the typical trade of the area. In his early teens he was apprenticed to a mason/builder in Paisley (Hall McLatchie). During this period it seems he was responsible for the highly impressive Corinthian capitals on the Glasgow Royal Exchange (1827) (now the Glasgow Gallery of Modern Art) earning him the nickname of "The Young Athenian". He moved to Glasgow in the early 1830s. Setting up his own practice there he employed his younger brothers; Robert Fillans and John Fillans.

Receiving financial backing from James Walkinshaw he trained more formally in Paris, France in 1835 before settling in London at 82 Baker Street. Whilst in London he met Sir Francis Chantrey, who recommended him to several patrons. Incoming commissions allowed him to move to High Holborn.

A commission to sculpt Archibald Oswald took him to Vienna in 1841, also permitting a visit to Italy and a second trip to Paris on his return.

The bulk of his commissions were Scottish and he returned to Glasgow in 1851.

He also was a portrait painter, exhibiting in the Scottish Royal Academy from 1837 to 1850.

He was father to the sculptors James Davidson Fillans (1850 – 1906 (buried Rookwood cemetery NSW)) and Wilhelmina Fillans. Hill and Adamson photographed Fillans with his daughters in 1845. Sir Daniel Macnee painted his portrait.

He is buried in Woodside Cemetery, Paisley beneath his own sculpture which he was working on for the grave of his father, who lies with him, when he died. The monument stands alone, to the north-west of the crematorium, on the path descending into the lower north section.

== Selected works ==
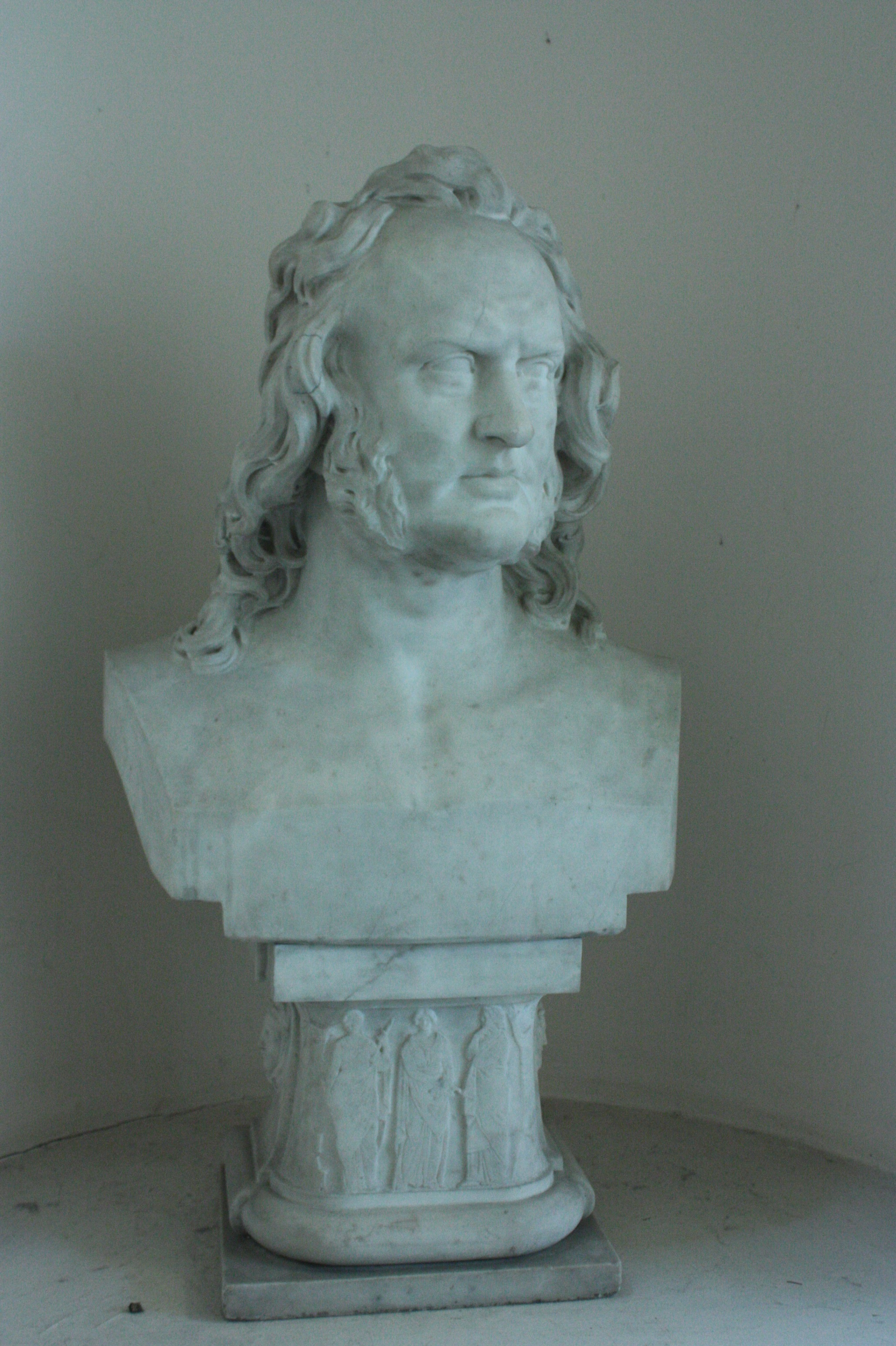
Prof John Wilson (Christopher North) by James Fillans

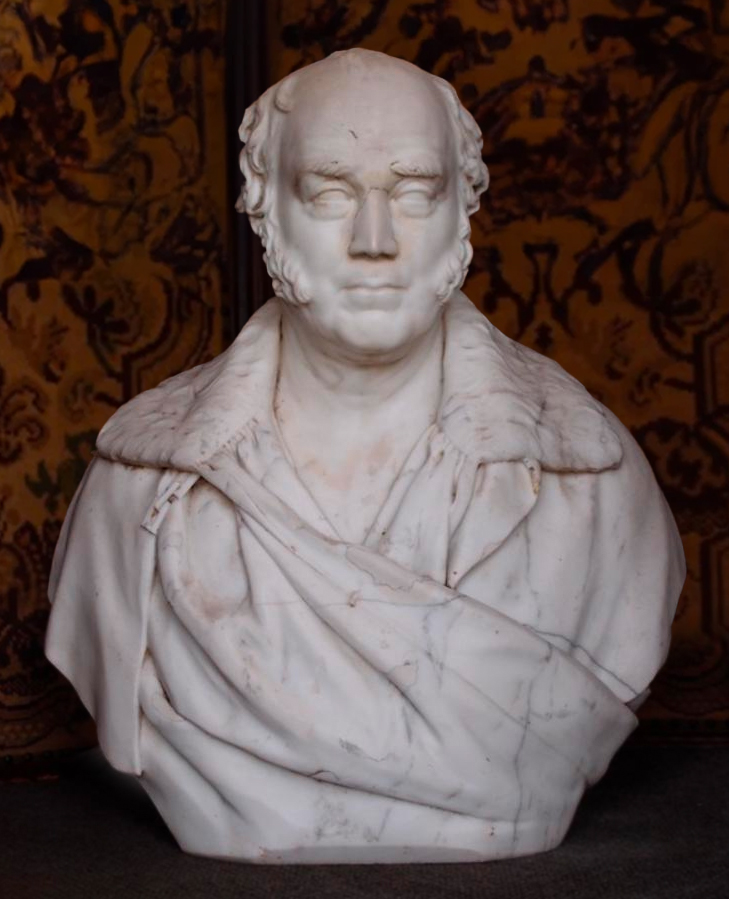
Bust of Archibald Campbell (Glasgow MP) by James Fillans

- Heads of the Corinthian columns on the Glasgow Royal Exchange Buildings (1827)
- Bust of Archibald Campbell of Blythswood, Paisley Sheriff Court (1838)
- Bust of John Burnet (1840)
- Monument to James Dick, Old Kirkyard, Ayr (1840)
- Monument to the author Dugald Moore, Glasgow Necropolis (1841)
- Monument to Dr Jacobus Brown, Glasgow Necropolis (1846)
- Bust of Christopher North, Paisley Museum (1848)
- Statue of Sir James Shaw, 1st Baronet (former Lord Mayor of London), Kilmarnock (1848)
- Monument to William Motherwell, poet, Glasgow Necropolis (erected 1851, sixteen years after his death)
- Monument to John Henry Alexander, Glasgow Necropolis (modelled 1852, completed posthumously by Alexander Handyside Ritchie )
- "Grief" an emotive stone figure on the grave of his father, James, in Woodside Cemetery, Paisley (modelled 1852 erected 1854) (erected posthumously and partly sculpted by John Mossman)
- Bust of Deacon Convener William McLean (1827–28), Trades Hall of Glasgow 85 Glassford Street, Glasgow
