= Archibald Campbell (died 1868) =

Archibald Douglas, later Campbell (1809 – July 1868) was the seventeenth Laird of Mains.

He was the son of Colin Douglas of Mains and Sophia Armine, daughter of J. Boydell. He succeeded on the death of his cousin, Archibald Campbell of Blythswood, in 1838 as twelfth Laird of Blythswood, he inherited Blythswood House and assumed the name of Campbell. He gave up the estate of Mains to his brother Colin.

He married Caroline Agnes, daughter of M. Dick of Pitkerro. She died 28 November 1897.

He died July 1868, leaving sons Archibald, Sholto Douglas and Robert Douglas Campbell. He was succeeded by his son, Archibald, who was created 1st Baron Blythswood in 1880.

== Sources ==
- The Heraldry of the Campbells, with notes on all the males of the family, descriptions of the arms, plates and pedigrees by G. Harvey Johnston, vol. II, pp. 30–31.
