= Barrington Campbell, 3rd Baron Blythswood =

British Army general

Major-General The Right Honourable The Lord Blythswood KCB CVO DL
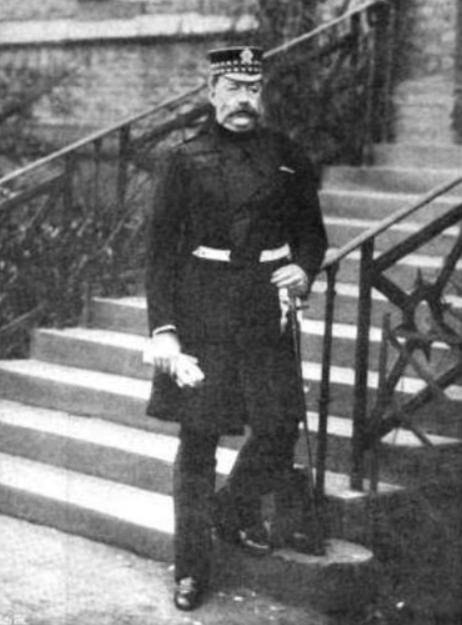
- In The Sketch, 12 February 1896
- Born: 18 February 1845
- Died: 12 March 1918 (aged 73); Coatbridge, Scotland
- Military career
- Allegiance: United Kingdom
- Branch: British Army
- Service years: 1867–1908
- Rank: Major-General
- Awards: Knight Commander of the Order of the Bath; Commander of the Royal Victorian Order

Major-General Barrington Bulkeley Campbell, 3rd Baron Blythswood, KCB, CVO, DL (18 February 1845 – 12 March 1918) was a British Army officer.

== Military career ==
Born the son of Archibald Campbell, 17th Laird of Mains, Barrington Campbell became a lieutenant in the Lanarkshire Yeomanry Cavalry on 15 October 1867. He served with the 1st Battalion Scots Guards during the Anglo-Egyptian War in Egypt in 1882, and was present in the engagement at El Magyar and Tel-el-Mahuta, and the Battle of Tell El Kebir (13 September 1882). He was awarded the Royal Humane Society Medal in 1889 for saving a life. He was promoted to Major-General in 1898. Following the outbreak of the Second Boer War in late 1899, he was in early 1900 appointed in command of the 16th Infantry Brigade sent to serve in South Africa as part of the 8th Division under Sir Leslie Rundle. He left Southampton for South Africa on the SS Britannic in March 1900. For his service in the war he was twice mentioned in despatches (including by Lord Kitchener dated 23 June 1902), and appointed a Companion of the Order of the Bath (CB).

Following his return to the United Kingdom, he served as Lieutenant-Governor and Commander-in-Chief of Guernsey from 1903 to 1908.

In 1908, his name was legally changed to Barrington Bulkley Douglas Campbell-Douglas. On 24 August 1910, he was appointed a deputy lieutenant of Lanarkshire. On 30 September 1916, he changed his name back to Barrington Bulkeley Douglas Campbell when he succeeded his brother, Reverend Sholto as Baron Blythswood. He inherited Blythswood in the County of Renfrewshire at that time.

He died in Coatbridge on 12 March 1918.

He was succeeded by his son, Brig.-Maj. Archibald Campbell who became 4th Baron Blythswood and who had also, in 1916, legally changed his name to Campbell-Douglas.

== Honours ==
Douglas-Campbell was appointed a Commander of the Royal Victorian Order (CVO) on 2 May 1902.

== Arms ==
Coat of arms of Barrington Campbell, 3rd Baron Blythswood

Crest
1st a lymphad as in the arms (motto over — "Vincit Labor") 2nd an oak tree with a lock hanging upon one of the branches Proper (motto over — "Quae Serata Secura").
Escutcheon
Quarterly 1st and 4th grand quarters counterquartered 1st and 4th gyronny of eight Or and Sable each charged with a trefoil slipped and counterchanged 2nd and 3rd Argent a lymphad Sable 2nd and 3rd grand quarters Argent a fess chequy Gules and of the first between three mullets in chief Azure a human heart in base Proper.
Supporters
On the dexter a savage wreathed about the temples and loins with laurel and holding in the dexter hand a club resting on the exterior shoulder Proper around his neck a gold chain pendent therefrom an escutcheon Argent charged with a human heart Gules sinister a lion Gules gorged with a collar flory-counterflory Or and pendent therefrom an escutcheon Argent charged as the dexter supporter.

Government offices
Preceded by Michael Saward	Lieutenant Governor of Guernsey; 1903–1908	Succeeded by Robert Auld
Peerage of the United Kingdom
Preceded by Reverend Sholto Campbell	Baron Blythswood; 1916–1937	Succeeded by Archibald Douglas-Campbell
