= Blythswood, South Africa =

Blythswood
- Location within Eastern Cape Location within South Africa
- Coordinates: 32.223°S 27.983°E
- Country: South Africa
- Province: Eastern Cape
- District: Amathole
- Municipality: Mnquma

Area
  - Total: 1.45 km^{2} (0.56 sq mi)

Population (2011)
  - Total: 416
  - Density: 287/km^{2} (743/sq mi)

Racial makeup (2011)
  - Black African: 97.8%
  - Coloured: 0.7%
  - Indian/Asian: 0.7%
  - White: 0.7%

First languages (2011)
  - Xhosa: 97.0%
  - English: 1.5%
  - Other: 1.5%
- Time zone: UTC+2 (SAST)
- PO box: 4963

Blythswood is a former Presbyterian mission station near Butterworth. Named after Captain Matthew T Blyth, first Chief Magistrate of the Transkei. It is an important education centre.

The Nqamakwe rock art site, showcasing some example of Khoisan rock art, is relatively close to the settlement.
