= Archie Campbell (footballer, born 1880) =

Scottish footballer

Personal information
- Full name: Archibald C. Campbell
- Date of birth: 1880
- Place of birth: Kirkintilloch, Scotland
- Date of death: 14 September 1918 (aged 38)
- Place of death: Nord, France
- Position: Outside left

Senior career*
| Years | Team | Apps | (Gls) |
- Kirkintilloch Rob Roy
| –1906 | Carlisle United | | |
| 1906–1909 | Clyde | 10 | (0) |
| 1909–1910 | Ayr | 20 | (2) |
| 1910–1914 | Ayr United | 67 | (12) |
| 1914–1915 | Abercorn | 23 | (1) |
- * Club domestic league appearances and goals

Archibald C. Campbell (1880 – 14 September 1918) was a Scottish professional footballer who played in the Scottish League for Ayr United, Ayr, Abercorn and Clyde as an outside left.

== Personal life ==
Campbell served as a driver in the Royal Field Artillery during the First World War and died of wounds on the Western Front on 14 September 1918. He was buried in La Kreule Military Cemetery, Hazebrouck.

== Career statistics ==
Appearances and goals by club, season and competition
| Club | Season | League | | | National Cup | | Total | |
| Club | Season | Division | Apps | Goals | Apps | Goals | Apps | Goals |
|---|---|---|---|---|---|---|---|---|
| Clyde | 1906–07 | Scottish First Division | 11 | 3 | 0 | 0 | 11 | 3 |
| Ayr | 1909–10 | Scottish Second Division | 20 | 2 | 6 | 0 | 26 | 2 |
| Ayr United | 1910–11 | Scottish Second Division | 22 | 5 | 7 | 0 | 29 | 5 |
| Ayr United | 1911–12 | Scottish Second Division | 22 | 4 | 6 | 0 | 28 | 4 |
| Ayr United | 1912–13 | Scottish Second Division | 22 | 3 | 5 | 0 | 27 | 3 |
| Ayr United | 1913–14 | Scottish First Division | 1 | 0 | 0 | 0 | 1 | 0 |
| Ayr United | Total | | 67 | 12 | 18 | 0 | 85 | 12 |
| Abercorn | 1914–15 | Scottish Second Division | 23 | 1 | ― | | 23 | 1 |
| Career total | | | 121 | 18 | 18 | 0 | 139 | 18 |
