= Archibald Campbell (cricketer) =

English cricketer

Personal information
- Full name: Archibald Mansfield Campbell
- Born: 14 August 1822; Madras, Madras Presidency, British India
- Died: 8 January 1887 (aged 64)

Domestic team information
- Years: Team
- 1843: Hampshire

Career statistics
Competition	FC
Matches	1
Runs scored	0
Batting average	0.00
100s/50s	–/–
Top score	0*
Balls bowled	–
Wickets	–
Bowling average	–
5 wickets in innings	–
10 wickets in match	–
Best bowling	–
Catches/stumpings	–/–
- Source: ESPNcricinfo, 1 May 2010

Archibald Campbell (14 August 1822 – 8 January 1887) was an English cricketer.

Campbell made a single appearance for Hampshire against Nottinghamshire. In the match Campbell was dismissed for a duck in Hampshire's first innings by William Clarke and remained unbeaten on 0 in Hampshire's second innings, with Hampshire losing by 39 runs.

Campbell died on 8 January 1887 at his home, Murrough's Dale Cottage in Govan, Glasgow.
