= Archibald Campbell (Glasgow MP) =

Scottish landowner and politician

Archibald Campbell of Blythswood (1763 –13 June 1838) was a Scottish landowner and politician.

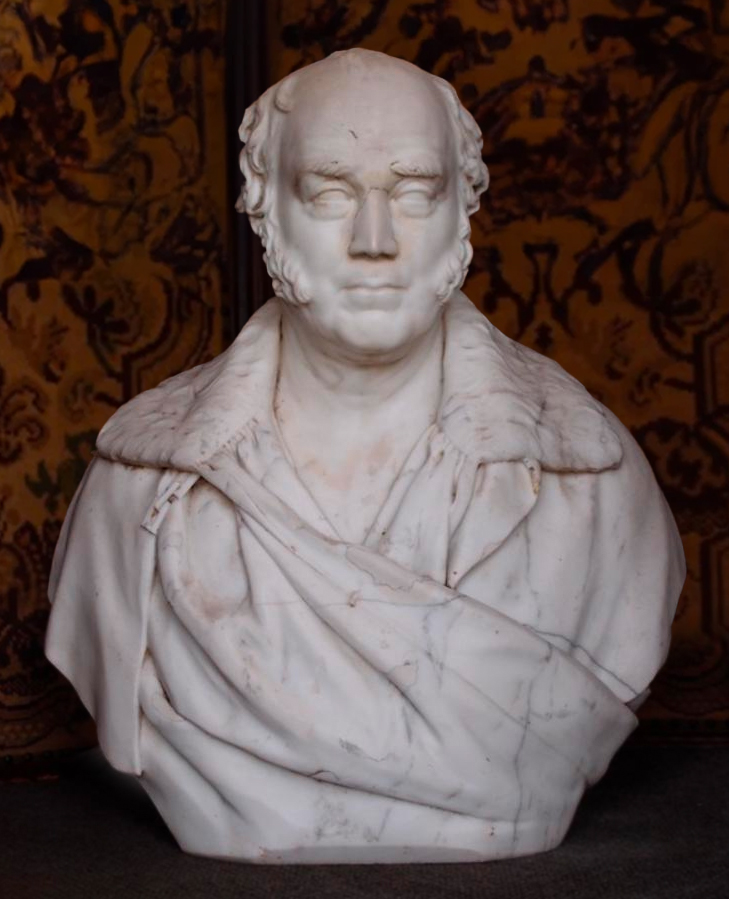
Marble bust of Archibald Campbell by James Fillans

== Life ==
He was born Archibald Douglas, the second son of Col. James Douglas of Mains who inherited the vast Blythswood estate in Glasgow – stretching west from Buchanan Street to the River Kelvin – in 1767, and was thereafter known as Campbell of Blythswood. His mother was Henrietta Dunlop, daughter of James Dunlop of Garnkirk.

On his father's death the estate passed to the first son Lt Col John Campbell, but when John was killed in Martinique in 1794, the estate passed to Archibald. Those parts closest to Glasgow were sold to developers, most notably William Harley, to create the New Town of Blythswood which John Campbell had enabled by Act of Parliament in 1792.

He joined the British Army and was a captain in the 1st Foot in 1790, promoted to major in 1794. He retired from the army when he inherited the family estate at Blythswood, Renfrewshire.

He was Senior Bailie for the City of Glasgow from 1802.

He was elected M.P. for Glasgow Burghs 1806–09, Elgin Burghs 1812, Perth Burghs 1818–20, and Glasgow Burghs 1820–31. He served as Lord-lieutenant of Renfrewshire from 1826 to his death and as Rector of Glasgow University from 1809 to 1811.

Campbell was unmarried and on his death the Blythswood lands passed to his second cousin Archibald Douglas of Mains, who also then adopted the surname of Campbell.

== Artistic depictions ==
A full-length portrait of Campbell was painted by Colvin Smith. A marble bust of Campbell by James Fillans resides in a private collection in the United States, while a copy is displayed at the Paisley Sheriff Court in Scotland.

Parliament of the United Kingdom
Preceded by Boyd Alexander	Member of Parliament for Glasgow Burghs; 1806–1809	Succeeded by Alexander Houstoun
Preceded by William Dundas	Member of Parliament for Elgin Burghs; 1812	Succeeded by Patrick Milne
Preceded by David Wedderburn	Member of Parliament for Perth Burghs; 1818–1820	Succeeded by Hugh Primrose Lindsay
Preceded by Alexander Houstoun	Member of Parliament for Glasgow Burghs; 1820–1831	Succeeded by Joseph Dixon
Academic offices
Preceded by Archibald Colquhoun	Rector of the University of Glasgow; 1809–1811	Succeeded by Lord Archibald Hamilton
