= Archibald Campbell, 4th Baron Blythswood =

Baron Blythswood in 1919.

Archibald Campbell, 4th Baron Blythswood KCVO (25 April 1870–14 November 1929) was the son of Barrington Campbell, 3rd Baron Blythswood, and grandson of Archibald Douglas of Mains.

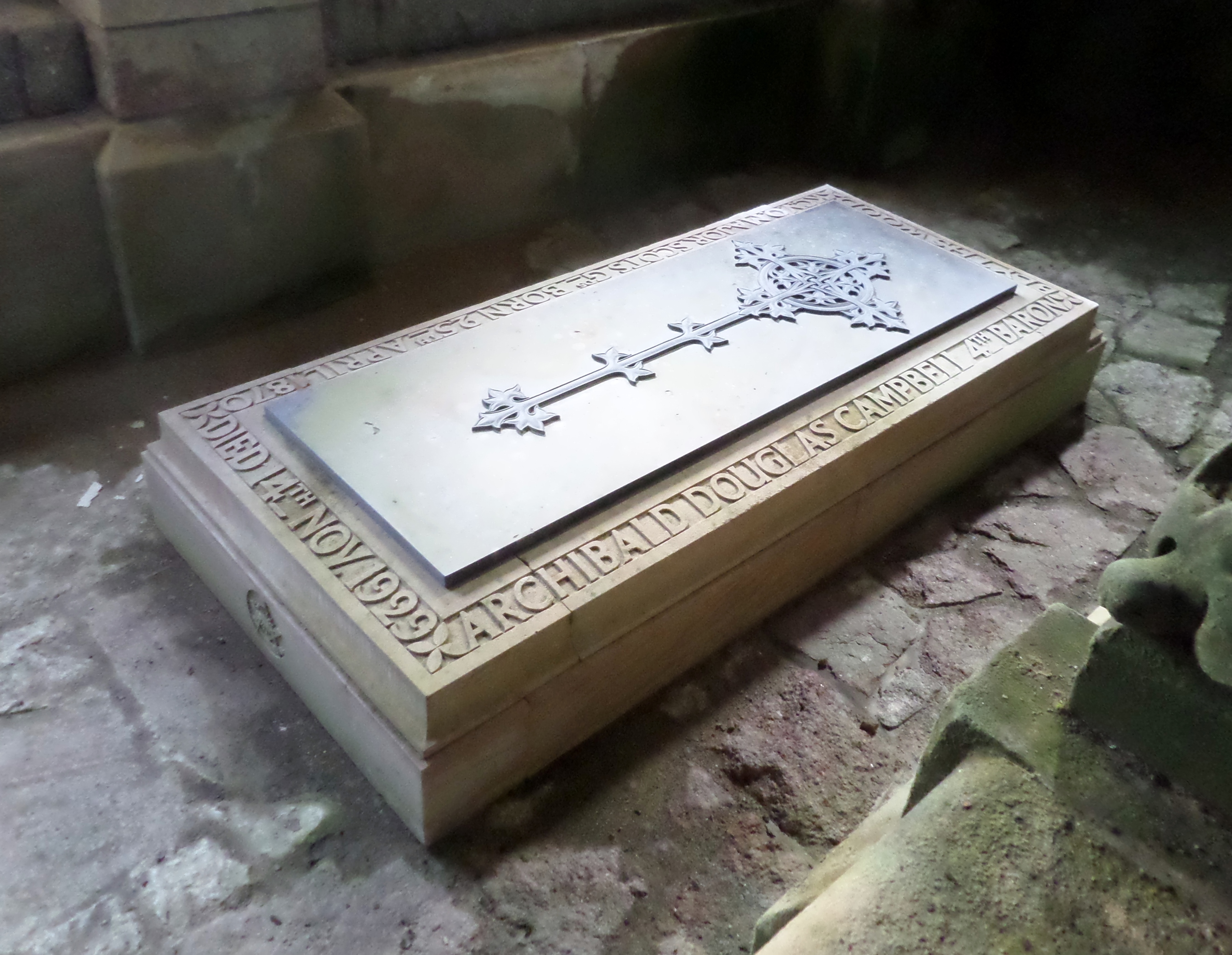
The tomb of Archibald Douglas Campbell in St Conval's Chapel, St Conan’s Kirk, Loch Awe.

In 1916 his name was legally changed to Archibald Douglas-Campbell, a surname previously used by his father. Shortly after succeeding to the title of 4th Baron Blythswood, co. Renfrew' on 13 March 1918, his name was legally changed back to Archibald Campbell.

The family name of the House of Blythswood is derived from Colin Campbell of Elie, a cadet of the House of Ardkinglass in Argyll, who acquired the estate during the reign of Charles I., but through his granddaughter and heiress the property passed to the Douglases of Mains in Dunbartonshire.

He gained the rank of Major in the Scots Guards (Special Reserve) and also in the service of the 4th Battalion, Argyll and Sutherland Highlanders. On 20 May 1922 he was appointed Honorary Colonel of 81st (Welsh) Brigade, Royal Field Artillery.

Campbell was educated at Eton and on 25 July 1895, he married Evelyn Fletcher and they had one child:

- Olive Douglas Campbell (1896–1949)

== Arms ==
Coat of arms of Archibald Campbell, 4th Baron Blythswood

Crest
1st a lymphad as in the arms (motto over — "Vincit Labor") 2nd an oak tree with a lock hanging upon one of the branches Proper (motto over — "Quae Serata Secura").
Escutcheon
Quarterly 1st and 4th grand quarters counterquartered 1st and 4th gyronny of eight Or and Sable each charged with a trefoil slipped and counterchanged 2nd and 3rd Argent a lymphad Sable 2nd and 3rd grand quarters Argent a fess chequy Gules and of the first between three mullets in chief Azure a human heart in base Proper.
Supporters
On the dexter a savage wreathed about the temples and loins with laurel and holding in the dexter hand a club resting on the exterior shoulder Proper around his neck a gold chain pendent therefrom an escutcheon Argent charged with a human heart Gules sinister a lion Gules gorged with a collar flory-counterflory Or and pendent therefrom an escutcheon Argent charged as the dexter supporter.

Masonic offices
Preceded by The Earl of Stair	Grand Master of the Grand Lodge of Scotland; 1926–1929	Succeeded by Alexander Archibald Hagart-Speirs
Peerage of the United Kingdom
Preceded by Barrington Campbell	Baron Blythswood; 1918–1929	Succeeded by Barrington Campbell
