= Blythswood Hill =

Coordinates: 55.862689°N 4.265708°W

- Location within Glasgow
- OS grid reference: NS583656
- Council area: Glasgow City Council
- Lieutenancy area: Glasgow
- Country: Scotland
- Sovereign state: United Kingdom
- Post town: GLASGOW
- Postcode district: G2
- Dialling code: 0141
- Police: Scotland
- Fire: Scottish
- Ambulance: Scottish
- UK Parliament: Glasgow Central
- Scottish Parliament: Glasgow Kelvin; Glasgow

Blythswood Hill, crowned by Blythswood Square, is an area of central Glasgow, Scotland. Its grid of streets extend from the length of the west side of Buchanan Street to Gordon Street and Bothwell Street, and to Charing Cross, Sauchiehall Street and Garnethill. Developed from 1800 onwards, its Georgian and Victorian architecture is a Conservation Area. It started as the "Magnificent New Town of Blythswood", becoming a part of the city-centre's business and social life. Today, the area forms part of the city's commercial office district, with retailing and recreation; and an annual Glasgow Blythswood Festival each May.

== History ==
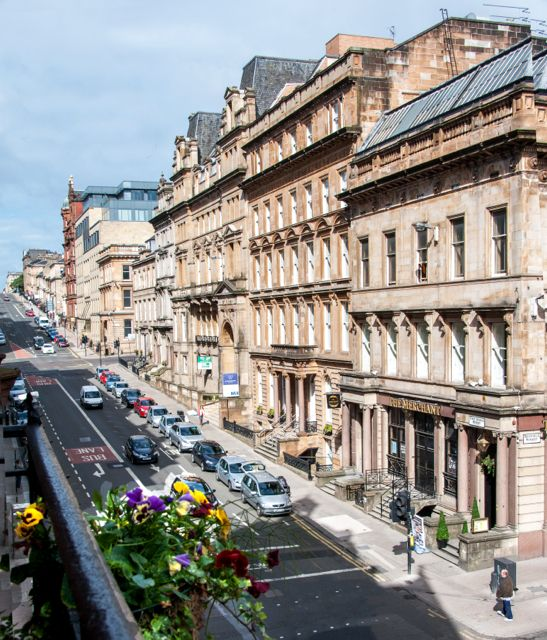
West George Street on Blythswood Hill, Glasgow city centre, viewing west

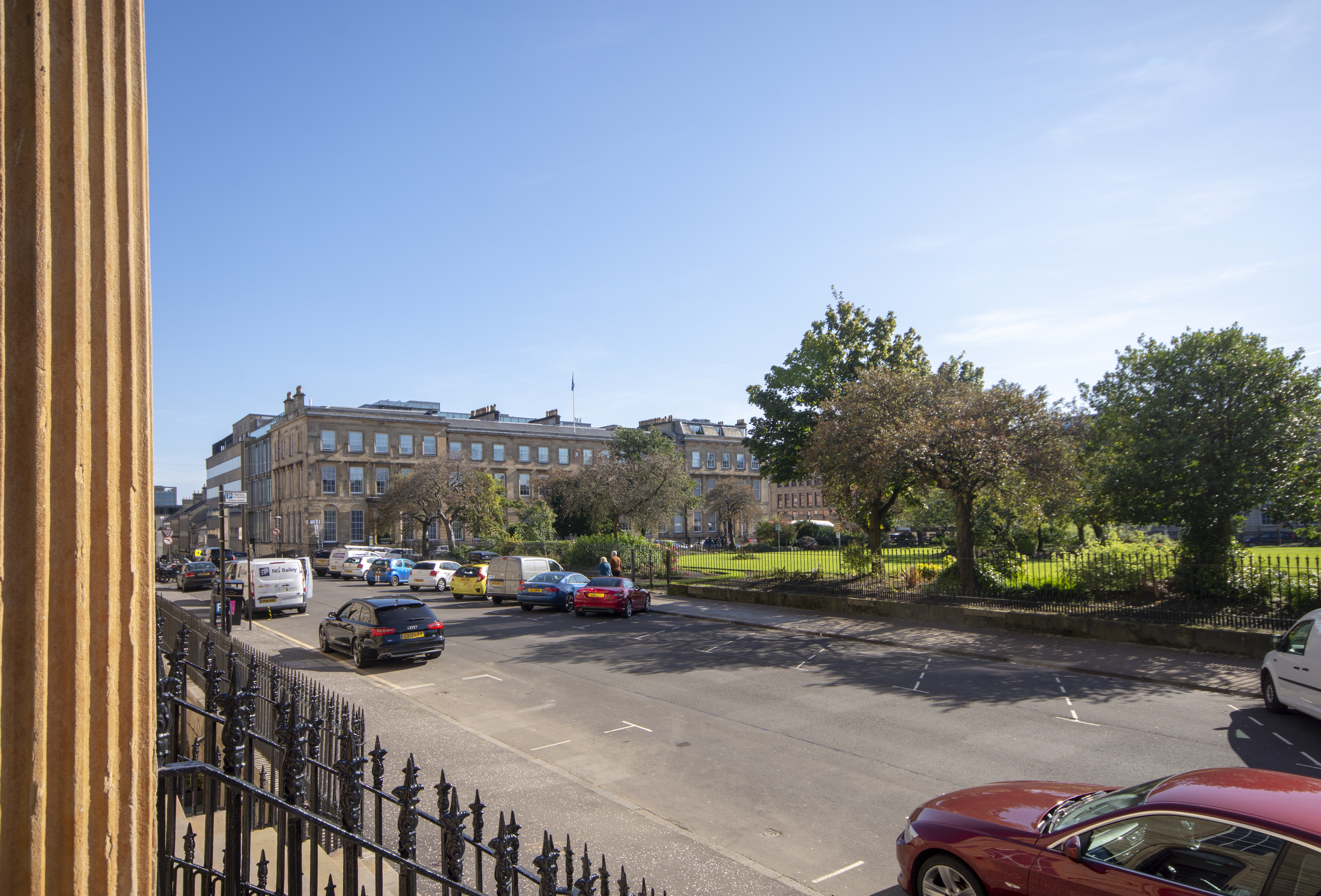
Blythswood Square, Glasgow, from the north side in line with West Regent Street.

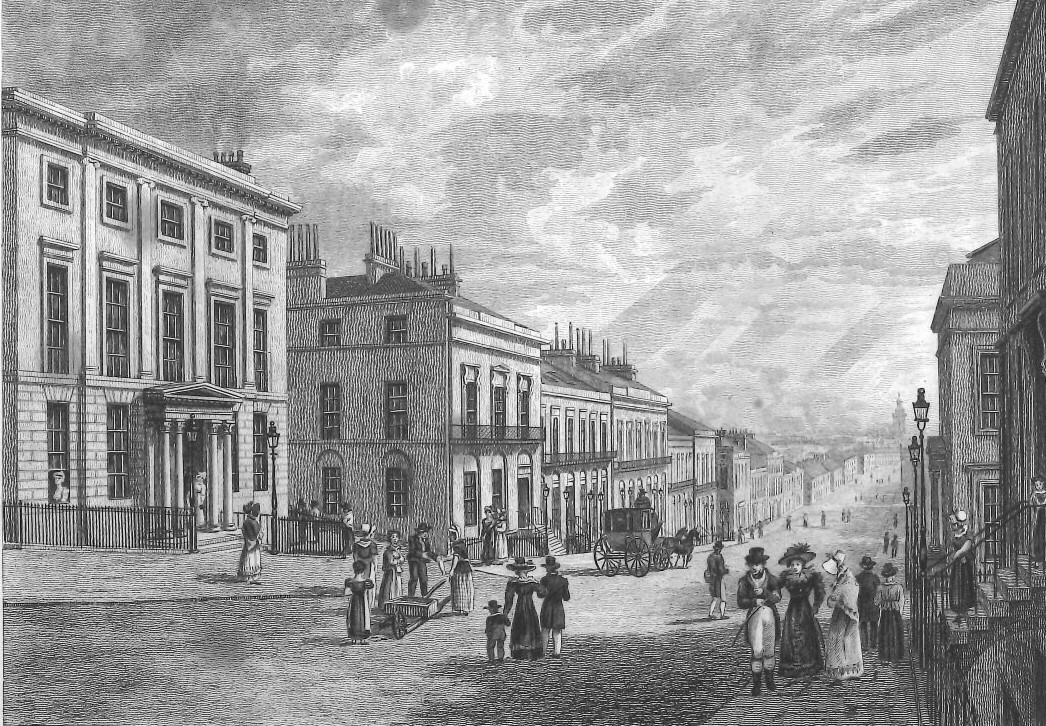
St Vincent Street on Blythswood Hill, Glasgow around 1830, viewing east.

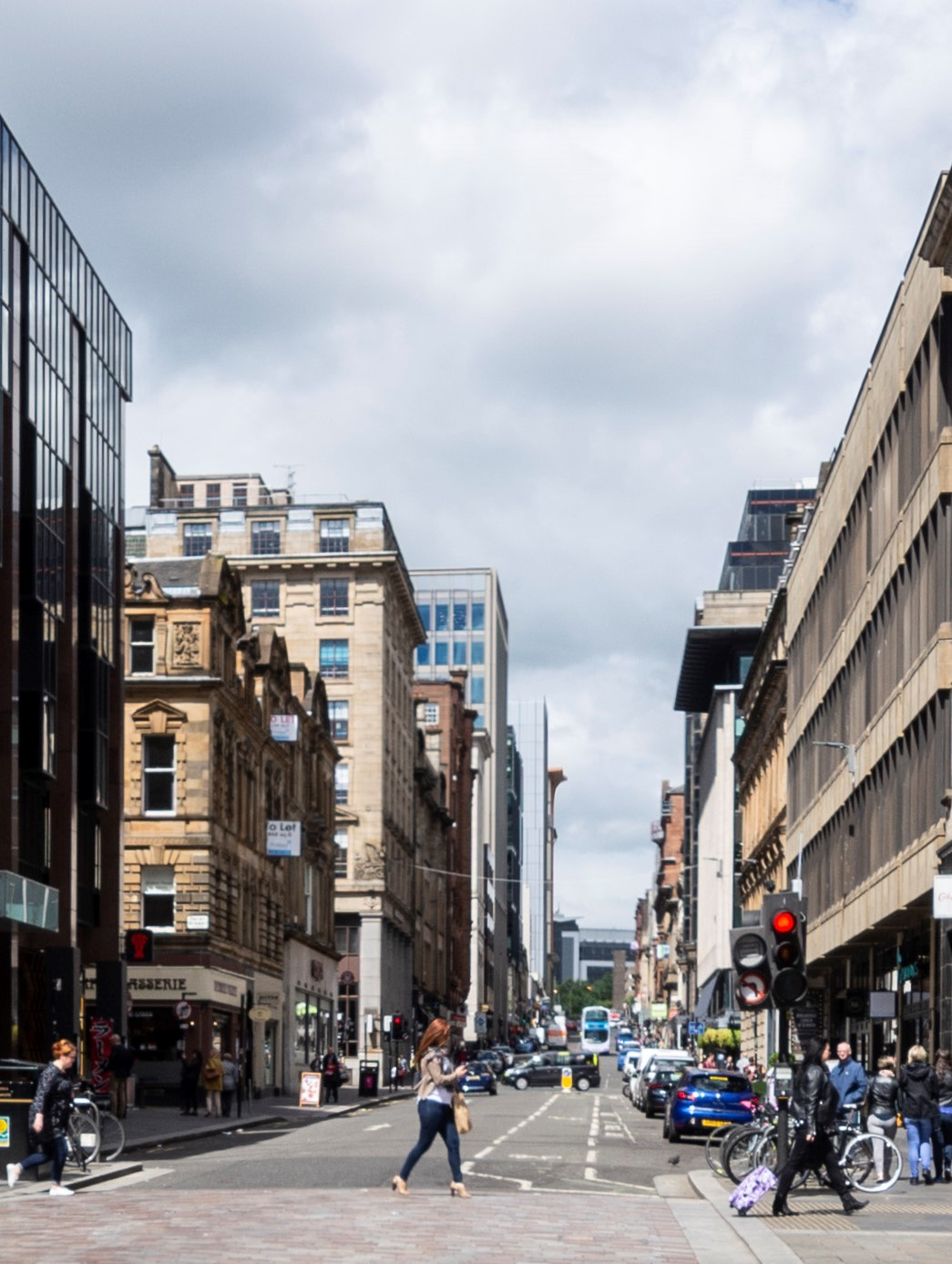
West Nile Street, the start of Blythswood Hill, viewing north from Gordon Street, Glasgow.

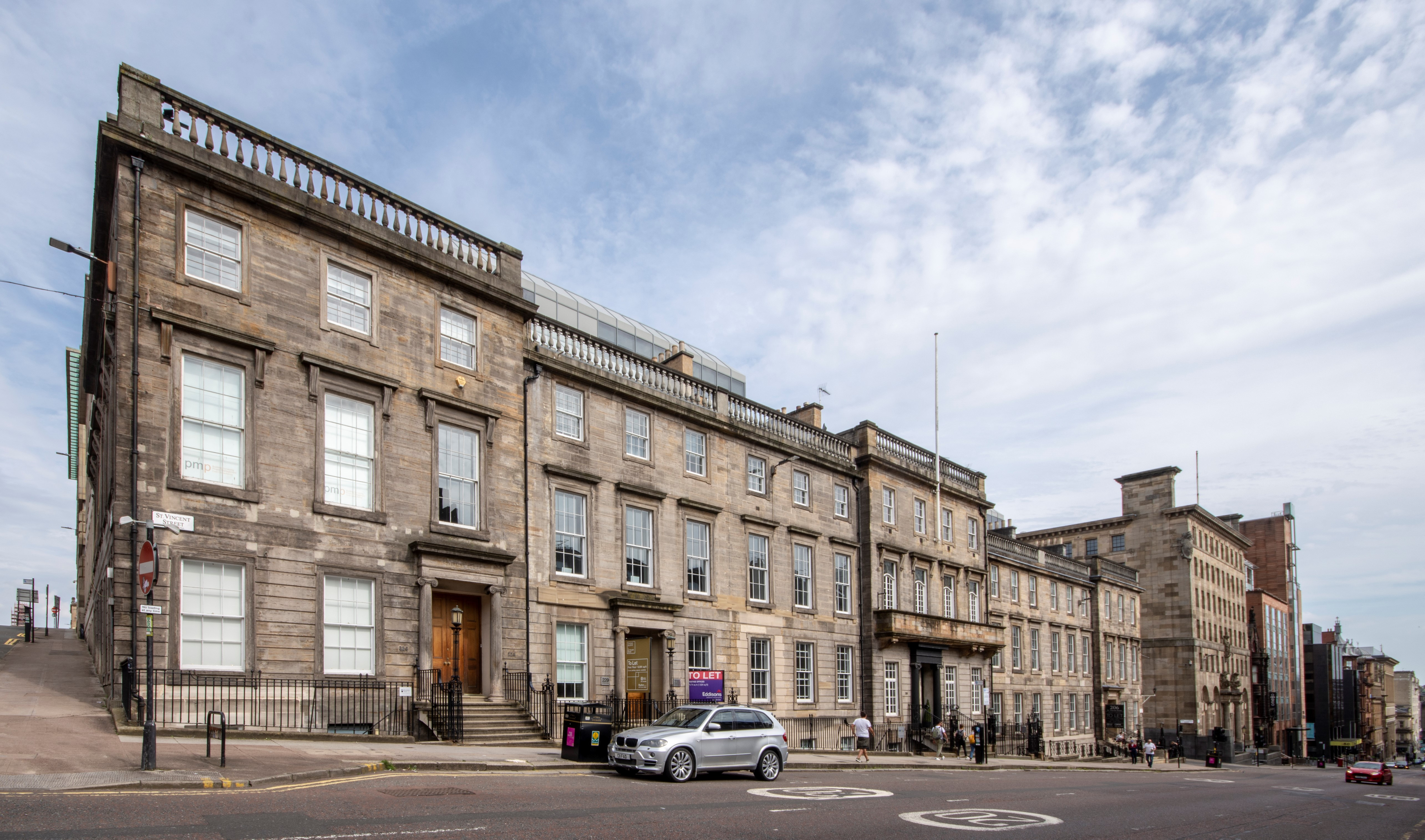
St Vincent Street close to the summit of Blythswood Hill, Glasgow.

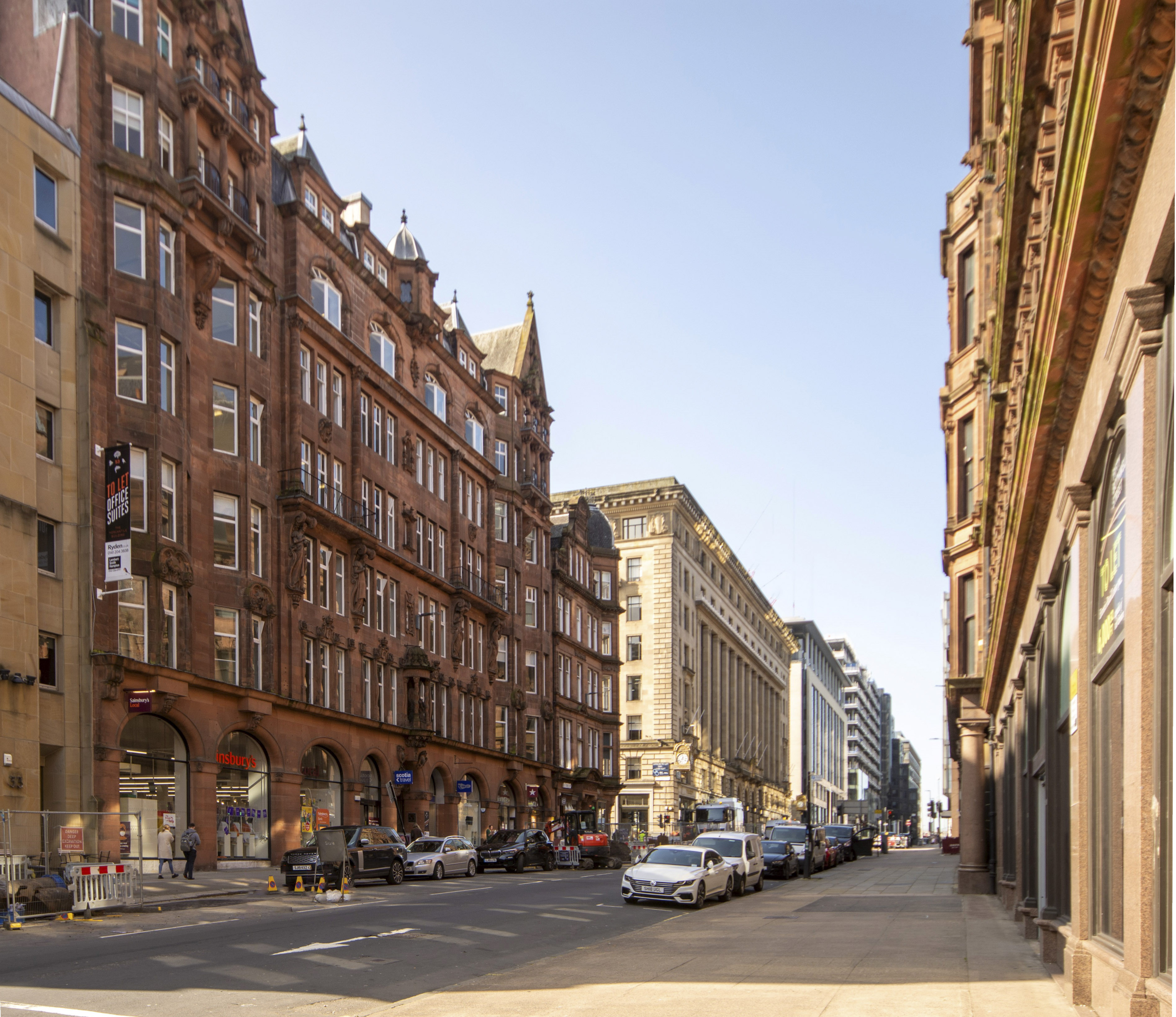
Bothwell Street, Glasgow, viewing west

After the Reformation the vast Lands of Blythswood, extending west and north to the River Kelvin and south to the River Clyde, were owned by the Glasgow merchant family Elphinstone; one descendant George Elphinstone became an MP of the Scots Parliament. Through his daughter it changed to the Douglas-Campbell family during the 17th century. Archibald Campbell, whose son became Lord Blythswood, setting about feuing the lands to developers.

Sitting on the western side of Buchanan Street, and starting at West Nile Street, rising to Sauchiehall Street and Blythswood Square it proceeds to the Charing Cross area. To its north is Garnethill. Blythswood Hill contains the area from Renfrew Street, Sauchiehall Street and Bath Street south to Bothwell Street and Waterloo Street.

The first new street to be opened up for housing was Sauchiehall Street, followed by Bath Street in 1802, by textile manufacturer and merchant William Harley (1767-1830). He also formed his indoor public baths, pioneered the first hygienic dairy in Europe, and a bakery at the eastern end of Bath Street. His planned Blythswood Square sits partly on his extensive pleasure grounds, viewing tower, orchards and bowling green which he opened for the public, next to his house of Willow Bank. Harley also owned much of the hill to the north which he named Garnethill in honour of Professor Thomas Garnett.

Blythswood developed thanks to the mercantile expansion of the city in the late 18th and early 19th centuries, housing the city's wealthy cotton merchants, chemical manufacturers and shipping magnates in Georgian townhouses and Victorian terraces. The whole area is on a grid-iron layout which started first around George Square in the 1790s, adopted by Glasgow Town Council, and continued for urban development west over Blythswood, and south over the Clyde to Tradeston, Laurieston and Hutchesontown. The grid-iron system was later adopted in 1830 by New York, followed later by Chicago, and other cities in America.

Blythswood Square was the home of Madeleine Smith (a daughter of architect James Smith) who in 1857 was tried in the High Court for the murder by arsenic poisoning of her lover Pierre Emile L'Angelier. Although the case was not proven, to the delight of the public, the story scandalised Scottish society, and is recounted in Jack House's 1961 book Square Mile of Murder.

Residential use is returning to parts of Blythswood Hill, while remaining mainly offices, hotels, shops, restaurants and art organisations. The former Royal Scottish Automobile Club building at 8-13 Blythswood Square has been converted to form the Blythswood Square Hotel. Glasgow Art Club continues in its duo of townhouses in Bath Street.

St. Vincent Street is the longest street and contains the largest number of buildings across the Hill, starting at the south west corner of George Square next to Buchanan Street. Rising westward it passes the summit at the Royal College of Physicians & Surgeons of Glasgow and descends further west, ultimately crossing over the sunken M8 motorway to its junction with Argyle Street at Finnieston, where now stands the city's first statue to architect Charles Rennie Mackintosh.

== Notable buildings ==
- Blythswood Square Category B listed terraces on each of its four sides (c.1823 – 1829) frontages by John Brash for the trustees and successors of William Harley
- Blythswood Square Hotel (2009) conversion of the Royal Scottish Automobile Club, remodelled 1923 by James Miller
- St Vincent Street Church (1859) by Alexander "Greek" Thomson, St Vincent Street, one of Glasgow's significant ecclesiastical buildings in architectural terms after the Cathedral
- St Columba's Church (1904), St Vincent Street
- St. Stephen's Renfield Church (1852) by John Thomas Emmett, corner of Bath Street and Holland Street
- Elgin Place Congregational Church (1865) by Sir J.J. Burnet, corner of Bath Street and Pitt Street (demolished 2005)
- Adelaide Place Baptist Church and Centre (1876), Thomas Lennox Watson, corner of Bath Street and Pitt Street
- King's Theatre (1904), for Howard & Wyndham Ltd by Frank Matcham, corner of Bath Street and Elmbank Street
- Glasgow Art Club (1840s), 185 Bath Street, opened as a club with gallery in 1893 designed by John Keppie with assistance by Charles Rennie Mackintosh
- Willow Tearooms (1903),from 2026 known as The Mackintosh Tearooms, Sauchiehall Street near Blythswood Street, Charles Rennie Mackintosh for Catherine Cranston
- Sovereign House (1893 onwards), 158/160 West Regent Street at West Campbell Street, formerly Institute for Adult Deaf & Dumb, and Church for the Deaf
- Commercial Bank former, (1930s) by James Miller, 92 West George Street, at corner of West Nile Street
- James Sellars House formerly the New Club, (1880), James Sellars, 144/146 West George Street
- 198 West George Street at corner of Wellington Street, (1820s) self contained example of original townhouse
- Lloyds/Union Bank of Scotland (1927) bank headquarters by James Miller, 110 St Vincent Street, corner of Renfield Street
- 200 St Vincent Street, formerly insurance headquarters (1929) by Sir J.J. Burnet, at corner of West Campbell Street
- Royal College of Physicians & Surgeons of Glasgow (1821 onwards), 242 St Vincent Street, with its College Hall added by Sir J.J. Burnet
- Bothwell Chambers (1850) by Alexander Kirkland, 4-28 Bothwell Street, corner of Hope Street, first and original buildings in new street and first purpose-built speculative offices in Glasgow
- Mercantile Chambers (1900) by James Salmon, 35-69 Bothwell Street
- Scottish Legal Life Assurance Building (1927) by Wylie, Wright & Wylie, 95 Bothwell Street, entire street block
