= Douglas of Mains =

Family

The coat of arms of Douglas of Mains

The Douglases of Mains are a branch of the Clan Douglas, related to the Lords of Douglas through Archibald I, Lord of Douglas. The first Laird obtained land through marriage into the Galbraith family, which had been granted land in New Kilpatrick by Maldowen, Earl of Lennox. The family produced minor nobles in the Scottish court, perhaps the most notable of which was Malcolm Douglas, the 8th Laird, executed for treason in Edinburgh for conspiracy in the Raid of Ruthven. His second son, Robert Douglas, was made Viscount of Belhaven and is buried in Holyrood Abbey. The family intermarried in the Glasgow area, having links with the Campbells of Blythswood, with landed families across Scotland (including the Duke of Douglas) and more latterly the United Kingdom. The title became extinct in the 20th century; the last 33 1/2 acres (13.6 hectares) of the estate (including the house) was sold to Dunbartonshire county and was subsequently used for the erection of the secondary school, Douglas Academy, in Milngavie prior to the death of the last heir (Lt-Col Archibald Vivian Campbell Douglas) in 1977.

== Title & Lineage ==
The Douglases of Mains are related to the Lords of Douglas through Archibald I, Lord of Douglas (born before 1198 – died ca. 1238), whose first son was William Longleg, Lord of Douglas and whose second son is said to be Andrew Douglas of Hermiston. The title Laird of Mains was created in 1373, when Nicholas Douglas, son of the fourth Lord of Hermiston married Janet Galbraith, from whom he obtained the lands of Mains. However it was not until 1672 that the 11th Laird registered the coat of arms with the Lord Lyon King of Arms.

Tracing the ownership of the title becomes increasingly difficult from the beginning of the 18th century, as the title became junior to the Campbells of Blythswood, with both titles being held by the same family, but never by the same individual. The title become extinct (in 1928) when the last heir (Archibald Vivian Campbell Douglas) was granted a disposition to break the hereditary ownership of the estate (and therefore enabling him to sell it). Archibald VC Douglas was subsequently father to two daughters. He died at his home, Laraich, two miles (three kilometres) west of Aberfoyle on 28 October 1977.

=== List of Lairds of Mains ===
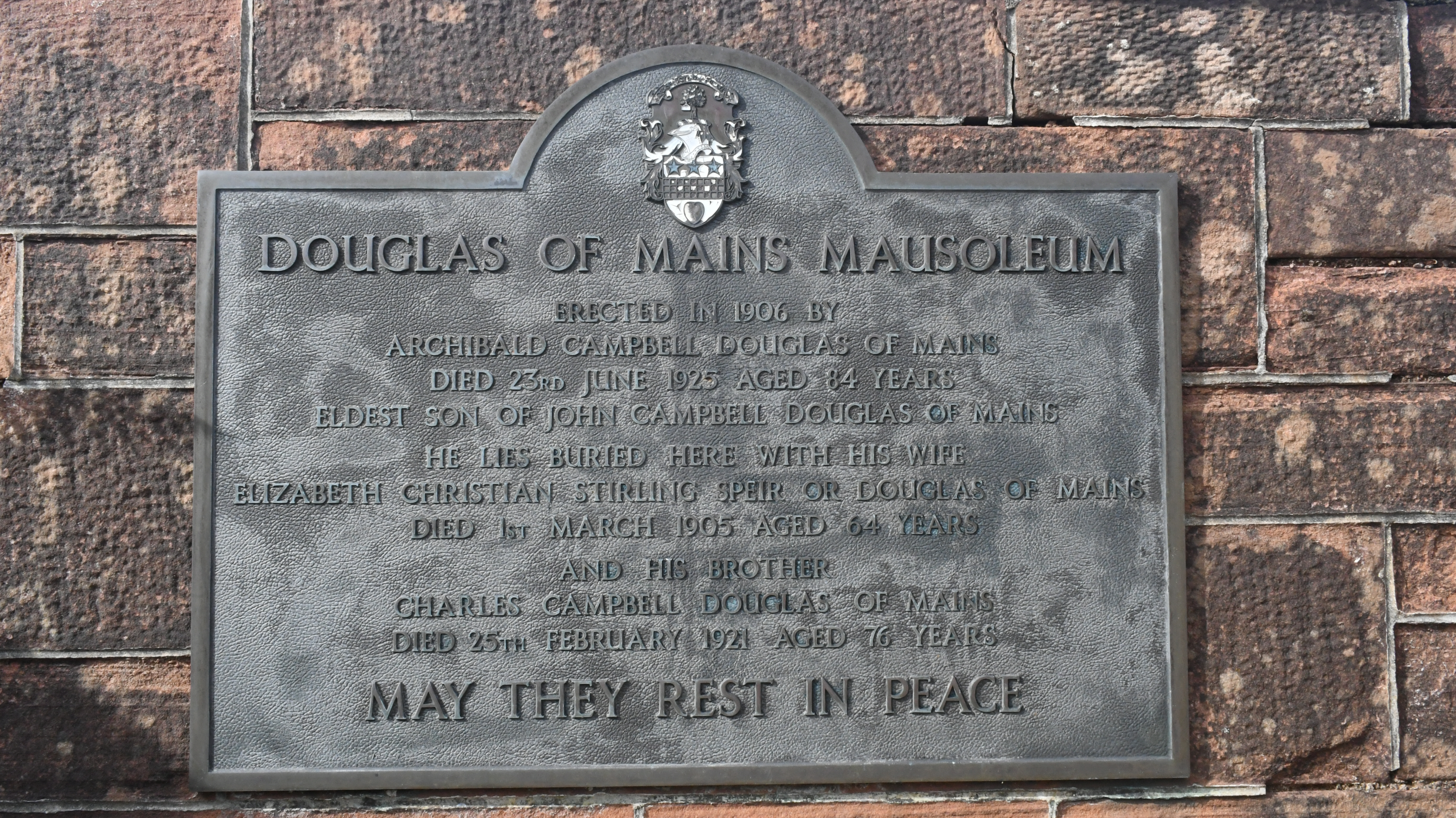
Douglas of Mains mausoleum plaque, New Kilpatrick Cemetery, Bearsden

- Nicholas Douglas, 1st of Mains and of Dounteray 1372-92 (younger brother of the 1st Lord of Dalkeith)
- James Douglas, 2nd of Mains and of Dounteray 1392-1420
- James Douglas, 3rd of Mains and of Dounteray 1420-90
- William Douglas, 4th of Mains 1490-91
- John Douglas, 5th of Mains 1491-1513 (killed at the Battle of Flodden)
- Alexander Douglas, 6th of Mains 1513-??
- Matthew Douglas, 7th of Mains ??-1571
- Malcolm Douglas, 8th of Mains 1571-84 (executed for treason at Edinburgh, 9 Feb 1584)
- Alexander Douglas, 9th of Mains 1584-1618
- Archibald Douglas, 10th of Mains (end of direct line; died before 1672)
- John Douglas of Ferguston, 11th of Mains d. 1701 (descendant of William, 4th Laird, (by his son Robert of Ferguston, and then from son to son through Walter, Malcolm, and Walter of Kaigtown to his son John 11th of Mains, the last male heir)
- James Douglas 12th of Mains 1701-1743 (second son of Mary Douglas and John Campbell, grandson of John Douglas, changed his name from Campbell to Douglas when he inherited Mains)
- John Douglas, 13th of Mains (1743–56)
- James Douglas 14th of Mains (1756–67) (Lord Blythswood from 1767)
  - Colin Douglas 15th of Mains (1767-1801) (brother of James)
  - Robert Douglas (1801–04) (brother of James)
- Colin Douglas, 16th of Mains (1804–20)
- Archibald Douglas 17th of Mains (1820–38), Lord Blythswood from 1838 and father of Archibald Campbell, 1st Baron Blythswood
  - Colin Douglas, 18th of Mains (1838–47) (brother of Archibald)
- John Campbell Douglas, 19th of Mains (1847–57), the son of Campbell Douglas (fifth son of John Douglas (13th) of Mains) Acquired Balvie estate and renamed the house "Mains", demolishing the original.
- Archibald Campbell Douglas (1857-1925) (he appears in the records of Ellangowan Masonic Lodge in October 1885 and in March 1905 as executor of the estate of his wife, Elizabeth).
- Brig-Gen Douglas Campbell Douglas, 20th of Mains (1925-1927)
- Lt-Col Archibald Vivian Campbell Douglas, 21st of Mains (1927–28; died at Laraich, Aberfoyle, Stirling, 28 October 1977)

(The numbering in source texts is inconsistent; some apparent titleholders appear to have been numerically skipped.)

== Arms ==
The arms of Douglas of Mains were registered with the Lord Lyon King of Arms in 1672 and are as follows:

The coat of arms of Douglas of Mains

- argent (silver background)
- a fess chequy gules (a middle horizontal band of red check)
- three mullets in chief azure (three blue stars across the top third of the shield) - this is different from other Douglas arms, which have a chief azure with three mullets of the field (background colour).
- a man's heart in base proper (a heart at the bottom, natural colour (red))

The arms have a crest of an oak tree, and the motto of the family is Quae Serrata Secura

The arms are based on those of the Earl of Douglas, which at the time the Mains branch was established, had three stars, but an uncrowned heart. The addition of a fess chequy represented the Lennox land (inherited through the Galbraiths) that formed the estate. The fess of the Stewart Earls of Lennox arms was a silver and blue check, but the Mains family changed the check colour to red (an old Lennox colour).

== Estate ==
The lands of Mains were granted, along with a number of others, early in the thirteenth century, by Maol Domhnaich, Earl of Lennox, to Maurice Galbraith. The Galbraiths were a great family in the shires of Stirling and Dumbarton, and in 1296 "Arthur de Galbrait" was one of the principal Barons of the nation who swore fealty to King Edward I. One of their chief residences was at the Castle of Craigmaddie, in this neighbourhood. The family line ended near the close of the fourteenth century in three heiresses, one of whom (Janet) married Nicolas Douglas, son of Sir John Douglas in September 1373, who became the first Laird of Mains. The estate remained largely unchanged until the annexation of neighbouring Balvie (also once a part of the Galbraith lands) in the 19th century. In 1884, the estate comprised 1,581 acres (6.40 km^{2}), with an income estimated at £2226 per annum.

=== Blythswood ===
When John Campbell of Woodside (third son of Colin, first of Blythswood) married Mary Douglas (daughter of the 11th Laird) they had two sons, the second of which, James Campbell, succeeded to Mains on the death of his grandfather. James Campbell changed his name to Douglas (under the terms of his grandfather's entail executed in 1701), and his elder brother (Colin Campbell), became the second Laird of Blythswood. Colin Campbell's only child and heiress was Mary Campbell, who married Colin Campbell, her first cousin. This Colin Campbell made an entail (to protect the Blythswood title) this time stating that the estates of Blythswood and Mains should not be held by the same person. Any family member from Mains inheriting the title of Blythswood had to change their name to Campbell. The only son of Mary and Colin, James, died in 1767 without issue. The direct line of Blythswood therefore came to an end and a long-running sequence of changes of name and title between the two estates began.

=== Annexation of Balvie ===
The Logan family held the neighbouring estate of Balvie from the end of the 14th century for many generations, but by the beginning of the seventeenth century Balvie was acquired by Humphrey, second son of Sir Alexander Colquhoun of Luss. In 1700 Balvie was sold to Robert Campbell, Writer to the Signet in Edinburgh, and it afterwards formed part of the Dougalston estates, which were purchased in 1767 by John Glassford, one of the most successful and respected merchants of his time. John Glassford was succeeded by his son Henry, and after his death in 1819, Balvie was acquired by James Macnair, who sold it to John Campbell Douglas of Mains. Balvie and Mains were then united and the name of Balvie dropped. The lands of Balvie were originally of large extent, but they had been gradually subdivided by sales and otherwise, and at the time of their purchase by the Mains family they were considerably smaller.

When John Campbell Douglas acquired Balvie, he made the house there the mansion-house of the family, changing its name to Mains, and extended it. He married Helen, daughter of Archibald Bogle of Calderbank, and had at least one son, Archibald Campbell Douglas.

== Notable Family members ==
=== Matthew Douglas, 7th Laird of Mains ===
On the orders of the Earl of Lennox (then regent for his grandson James VI), Thomas Crawford of Jordanhill, Matthew Douglas of Mains and John Cunningham of Drumquhassle (proprietor of Killermont) retook Dumbarton Castle from John Fleming on 2 April 1571. An Act of Parliament was passed on 28 August 1571 in favour of "Johnne Cuningham of Drumquhassel, Matho Dowglas of Manys, Captain Thomas Crawford of Jordanhill, and others takeris of the Castell of Dumbartane," discharging them of any criminal or civil liabilities incurred in the recapture of the castle.

=== Malcolm Douglas, 8th Laird of Mains ===
Malcolm Douglas of Mains was allegedly involved in an intrigue to recover debts owed to William Ruthven, 1st Earl of Gowrie by nobles in the king's court and to influence the Scottish monarchy. In August 1582 he along with the Earl of Gowrie, The Earl of Angus, and others, participated in the Raid of Ruthven. They captured King James VI and held him prisoner in what is now known as Huntingtower Castle, Perth and Kinross. The King escaped and the Ruthven Raiders were subsequently tried for kidnapping and treason.

Douglas of Mains and others including John Cunningham of Drumquhassle (a member of his wife's family were brought before an assize, on 9 February 1584, for conspiring in the Raid of Ruthven. Robert Hamilton of Inchmachane (or Ecclesmechan) appears to have come forward as a witness against them.

Douglas and Cunningham were both found guilty and sentenced to be hanged, drawn and quartered at the Market Cross, in Edinburgh. They were publicly executed the same day.

The story has been romanticised over time by many authors, including Sir Walter Scott, with Malcolm Douglas being described as a "gentleman of considerable property, and universally respected" and (by his enemies) "dreaded on account of his courage and independence of spirit". The key witness against him, Robert Hamilton, has been accused of being motivated by financial reward, while the evidence given by him was considered to be false. The second witness, James Edmonstone of Duntreath was allegedly put on a false charge to make him corroborate the evidence in exchange for a pardon.

=== Archibald Douglas, 17th Laird of Mains ===
see Archibald Campbell (the name he assumed in later life)

=== Robert Douglas, 1st Viscount Belhaven ===
see Robert Douglas, 1st Viscount of Belhaven

=== Margaret, Duchess of Douglas ===
Margaret, Duchess of Douglas, was daughter of James Douglas of Mains (12th) and obtained her title by marriage to Archibald Douglas, 1st Duke of Douglas (part of the Red Douglas family, and a distant relation). Margaret and Archibald married late in life, did not have children, and the title of Duke of Douglas became extinct on Archibald's death. The estates of Douglas became the subject of a legal battle (known as the Douglas Cause) between Archibald Steuart (the Duke of Douglas' nephew) and the Duke of Hamilton, who inherited the remaining titles of Douglas. Margaret supported Archibald, who was granted the estates after appeal to the House of Lords. In her will, she left money to purchase lands to be called Douglas-Support.

=== Captain Andrew Douglas ===
Captain Andrew Douglas of Mains (lineage uncertain) was involved in the slave trade of the late 17th and early 18th centuries. His daughter Jean married into the Kennedy family of Culzean Castle in 1705. A West African slave from Guinea, named Scipio, was apparently taken as a child into the ownership of Andrew Douglas for three years before being transferred to Jean after her marriage, possibly to work as a page. After being educated, Scipio managed to obtain his freedom in 1725, having been baptised as a Christian. Scipio continued to work in the service of Jean and was given a house and some land within the grounds of Culzean.
