= William Harley =

Scottish entrepreneur (1767–1829)

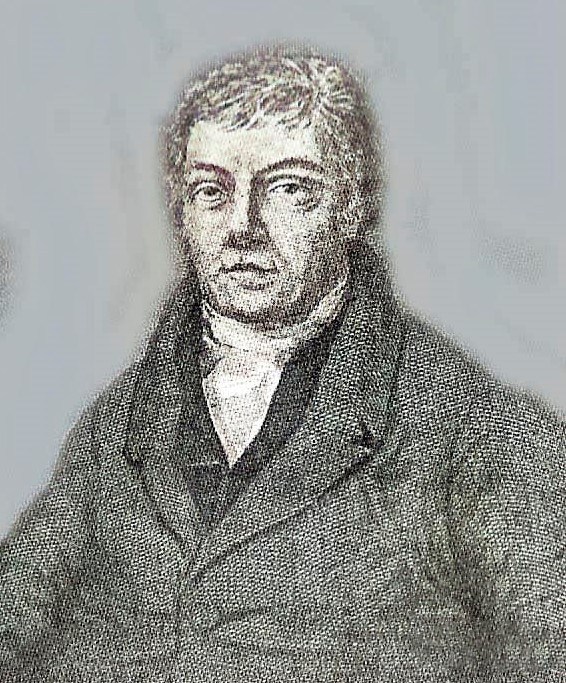
- Born: 1767; Glen Devon, Scotland
- Died: 1830 (aged 62–63); London, England

William Harley (1767–1830) was a Scottish textile manufacturer and entrepreneur who is known for his early contributions to the city of Glasgow, including the development of the New Town of Blythswood, covering Blythswood Hill, and pioneering hygienic dairy farming.

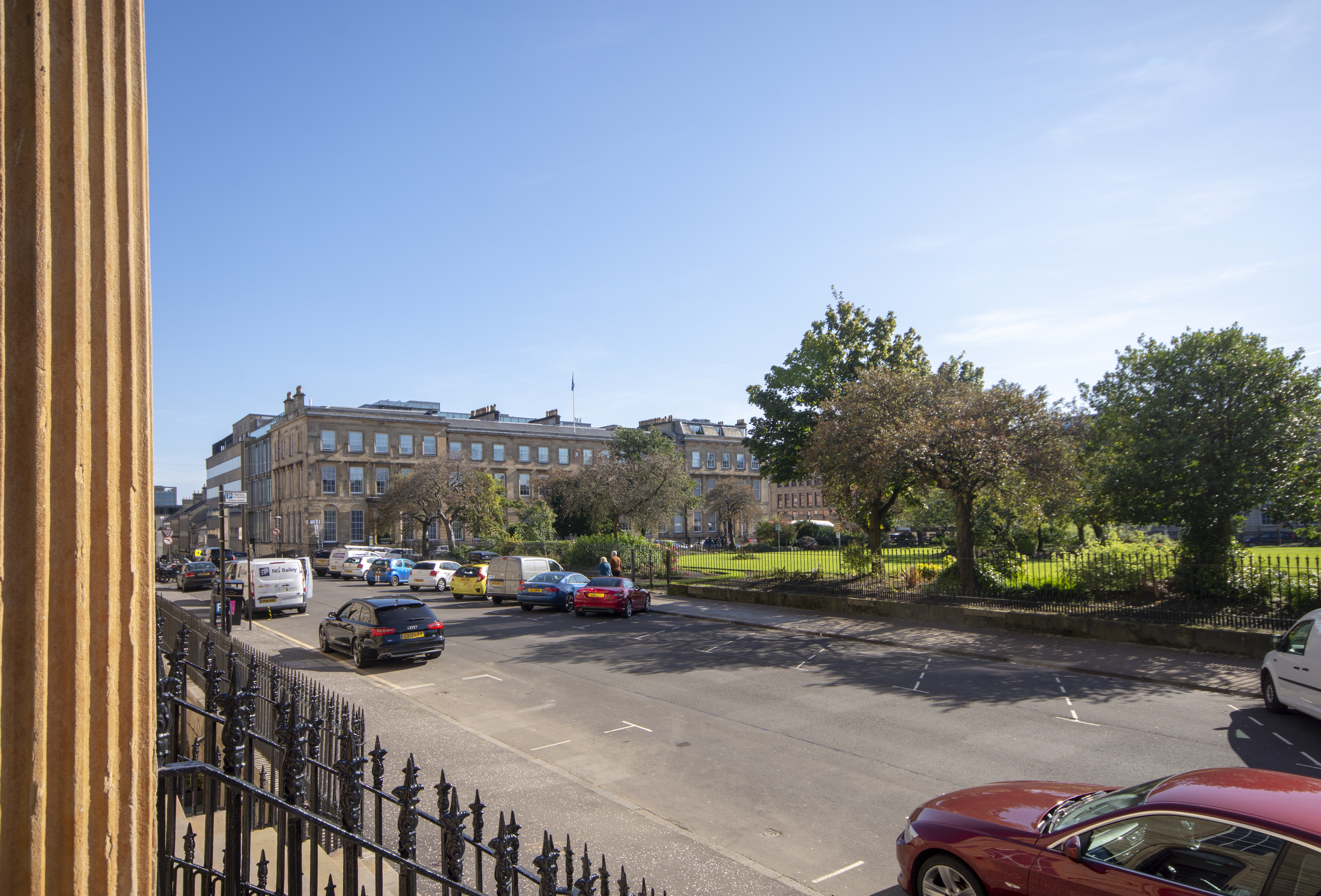
Blythswood Square, Glasgow, from the north side in line with West Regent Street.

== Early life ==
Harley was born in Glen Devon, Scotland, but lost both parents at an early age, so was brought up by his paternal grandmother. He trained as a weaver in Kinross under the employ of his maternal uncle who produced satinet, and then later for his uncle's business in Perth.

== Ventures ==
In 1789 William Harley moved to Glasgow, becoming a textile manufacturer, employing some 600 handloom weavers in partnership with a fellow member of the Merchants House but soon opened his own business warehouse on the corner of George Square on South Frederick Street, manufacturing turkey red gingham.

=== Development of Blythswood ===
By 1802, and now married to Jane Laird of Greenock, his business was so profitable that he purchased a house called Willowbank and ten acres of land adjacent to the future Sauchiehall Street from Lawrence Phillips of Anderston. Two years later he bought 35 acres of the vast Blythswood Lands from Archibald Campbell to start developing the area as part of the Campbell's planned New Town of Blythswood. This was land just west of the partly developed Buchanan Street rising westward to the future Blythswood Square. With his engineer James Cook, of Tradeston, Harley laid out all the streets on Blythswood Hill including West George Street and St Vincent Street.

William Harley employed stonemason firms to build the first terraces of townhouses which were along the southside of Sauchiehall Street, and erected before 1815. He also sold tracts of land, already serviced by him, to others for housebuilding. In the 1820s he devised and laid out Blythswood Square, adjacent to his 10-acre Willowbank pleasure gardens which were, open to paying members of the public. To allow people to travel to his gardens he had a road created from the city along what is now Bath Street, and had a bridge built to cross St Enoch's Burn which ran down what is now West Nile Street and Mitchell Lane to St Enoch Square. He used the arches on either side of the burn to store ice becoming the city's first ice merchant. The building of the four terraces surrounding his new square took place in the years to 1827. At the peak of the development of Blythswood Hill there were 1,800 stonemasons at work. By far it became the healthiest and wealthiest part of the city.

=== Water supplier and public baths ===
About 1804, at a time when people had to queue at wells within the city to pump water, Harley also started a business piping fresh water from springs on his Willowbank property west to a reservoir tank on the northeast corner of what is now Bath Street and West Nile Street, and selling it twice a day directly to people's doors via water tanks on carts. However, when the very new Glasgow Waterworks Company and Cranstonhill Company started pumping water from the River Clyde direct to people's homes, Harley's water distribution business switched to service another of his new projects, the creation of the first indoor public baths in Scotland. Bath Street was later named after these baths.

=== Harley's Byres ===
Harley had cows at Willowbank and at his Sighthill farm of 36 acres just north of the new Royal Infirmary. In 1809, after supplying milk from one of his cows as requested by customers visiting his indoor public baths, William Harley now established the first hygienic dairy in Europe known to all as “Harley’s Byres” adjacent to the baths, starting with 24 cows.

Eventually he designed and built three cowsheds housing 300 cows. Harley's principles of hygiene continue today worldwide, involving strict practices in employee cleanliness, sterilisation of equipment, and improved animal cleanliness and husbandry, with increased output and quality of milk. This attracted attention from home and overseas including Nicholas I of Russia, Archdukes John and Louis of Austria, He was asked by the Highland Society of Scotland to write a book on his methods which he finally published in 1829, a year before his death in London. Harley also built a viewing gallery within his byres, charging admission from people wishing to view the milking.

=== Willowbank Baking ===
After his success supplying water and milk to the city and suburbs, in 1815 Harley was asked to supply bread to the city. His employees started baking bread, biscuits etc. and selling to Glasgow and its suburbs, and distributing it by steamer to towns along the Firth of Clyde.

== Economic depression ==
The lengthy French Revolutionary Wars followed by the Napoleonic Wars, finally ending at the Battle of Waterloo of 1815, had a dramatic effect on trade and business throughout Britain. William Harley continued to run his businesses as they struggled for a year or two thereafter, but then they were placed in a trust formed by some contemporaries in an attempt to keep them going. However the Royal Bank of Scotland finally in 1821 had to sequestrate him, the property developments being finalised by others or sold off entirely.

== Legacy ==
The creation of the main parts of the New Town of Blythswood from West Nile Street westwards to Blythswood Square. Founder of the principles of hygiene in dairying, first in Europe.

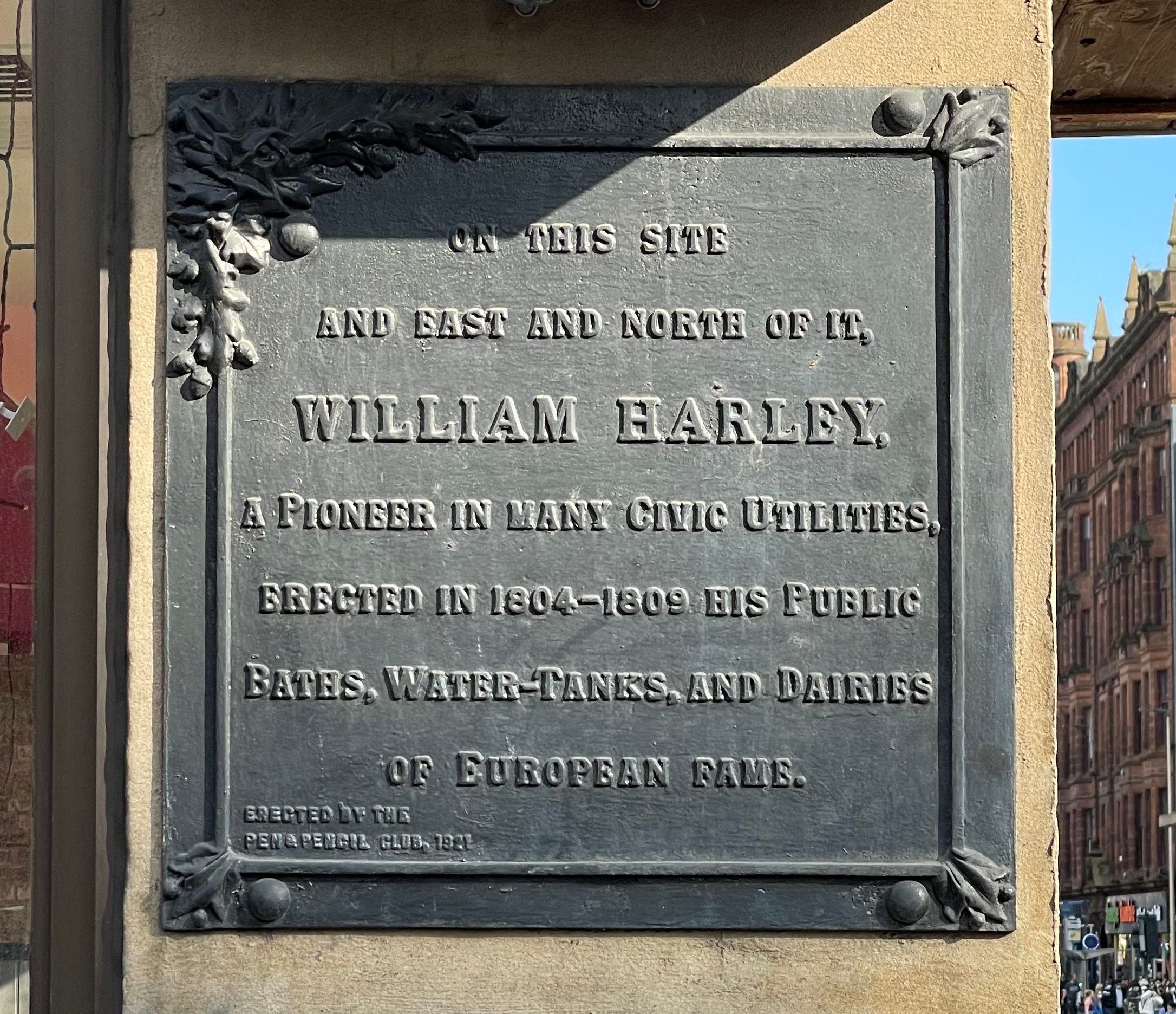
Memorial plaque placed at corner of Renfield Street and Bath Street in Glasgow

John Galloway wrote a biography of Harley which was published in 1901.

In 1921 the Pen & Pencil Club erected a plaque in recognition of Harley on Renfield Street at the corner with Bath Street, at the location where Harley had started his water, dairy and bakery businesses.

Graeme Smith wrote a biography of William Harley and family and the development of Glasgow's New Town of Blythswood from 1800 to the present day, in 2021.

== Personal life ==
William Harley married Janet (Jane) Laird, eldest daughter of John Laird, rope and sail manufacturer in Greenock, (and sister of William Laird) in 1801, and they had six daughters and four sons.

In 1829 he was invited by the Tsar of Russia to manage and improve the new Imperial dairy in Saint Petersburg, but while travelling he took ill and died in London. Harley was buried in London's notorious Spa Fields graveyard.

== Works ==
- Harley, William (1829). The Harleian dairy system : and an account of the various methods of dairy husbandry pursued by the Dutch. Also, a new and improved mode of ventilating stables. London: J. Ridgway.
