= Blythswood Square =

Square in Glasgow City, Scotland

Coordinates: 55.86353°N 4.26317°W

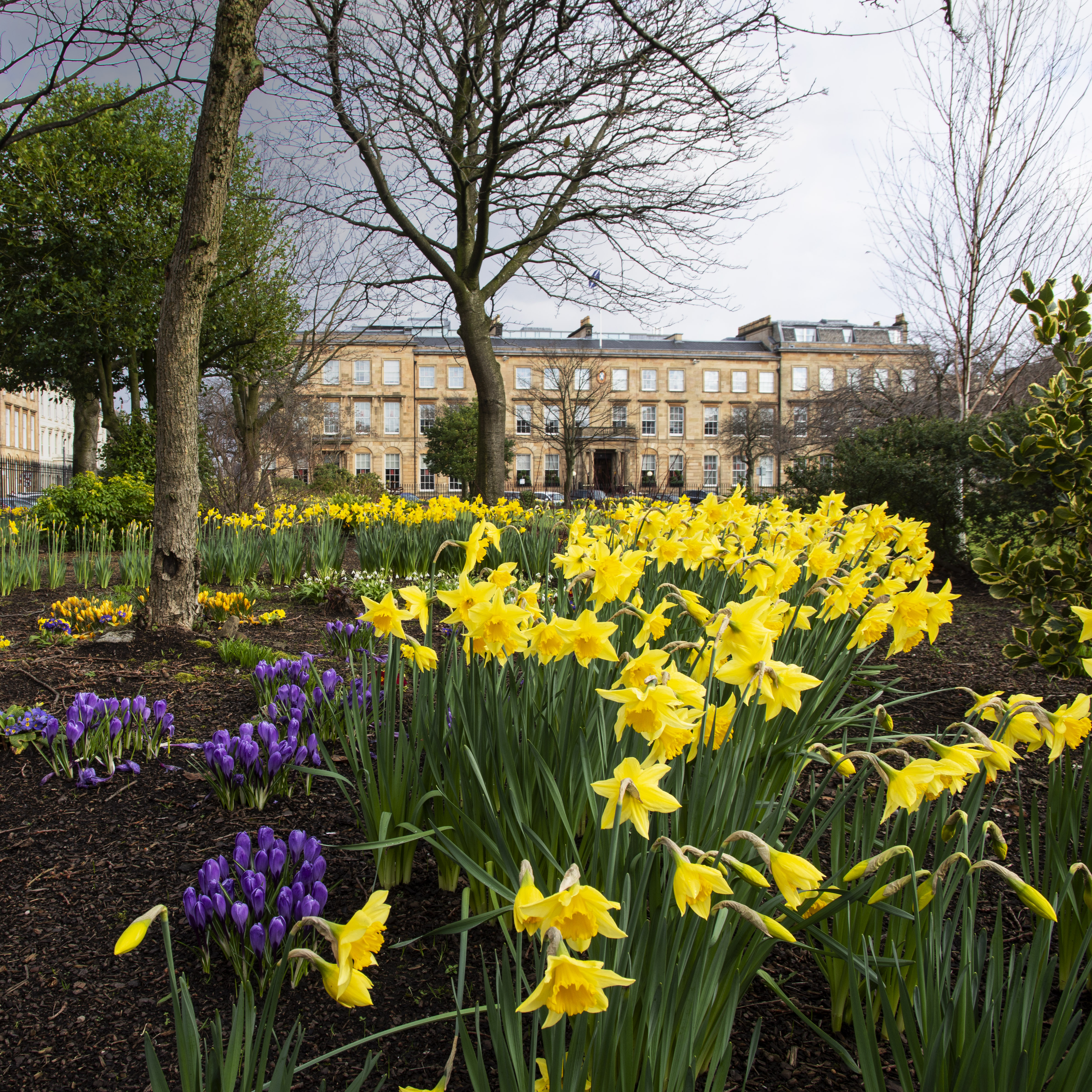
Springtime in Blythswood Square, Glasgow, created in the 1820s.

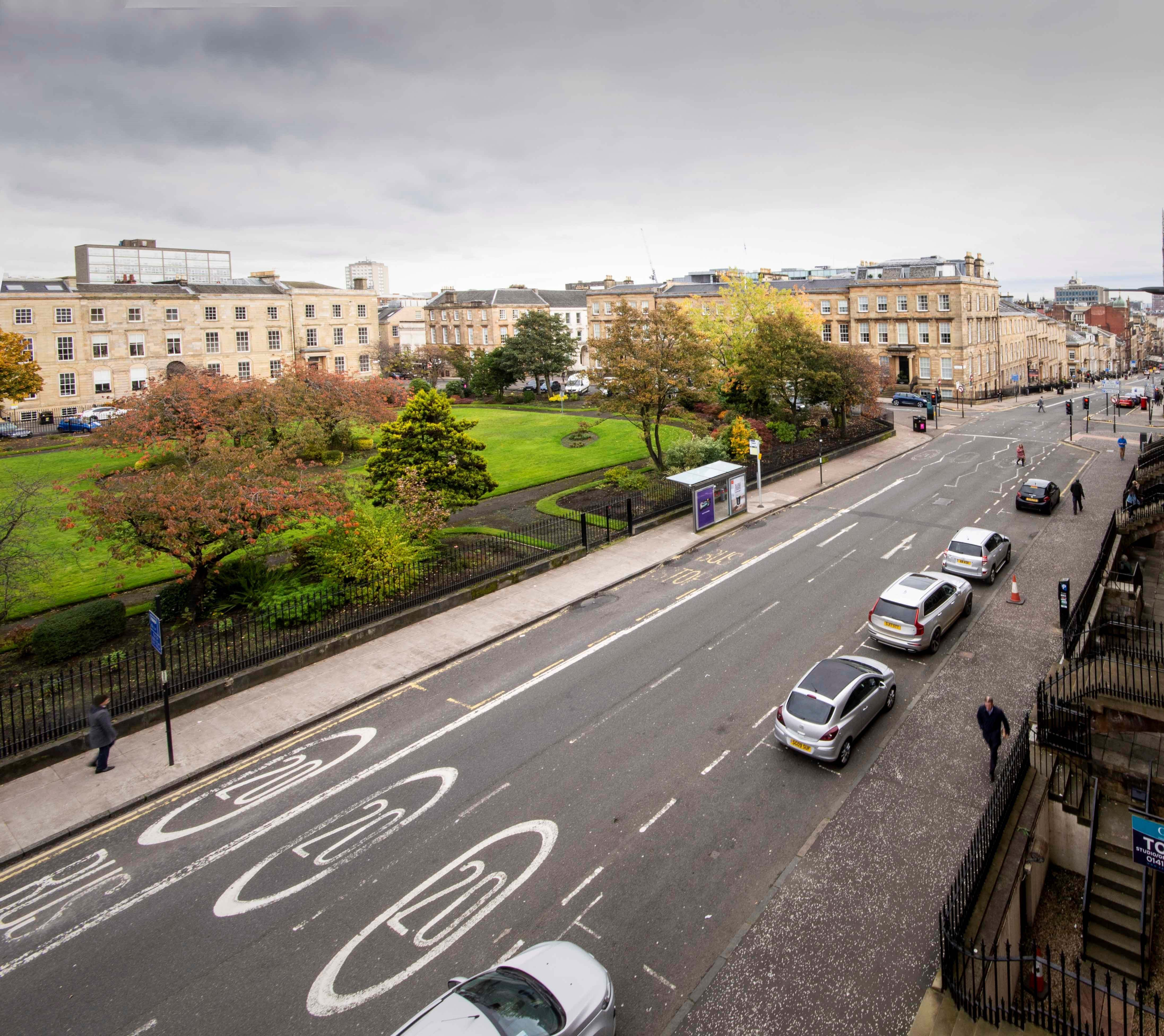
Blythswood Square, Glasgow at the top of West George Street.

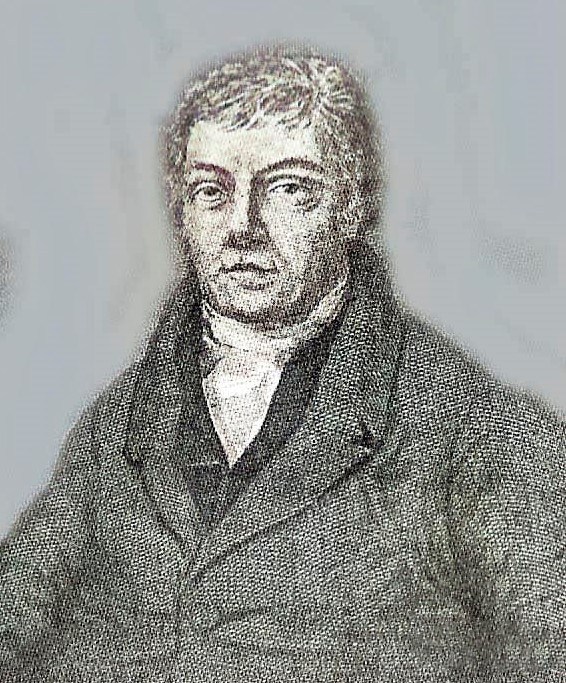
William Harley, 1767–1830, developer of Blythswood and creator of Blythswood Square.

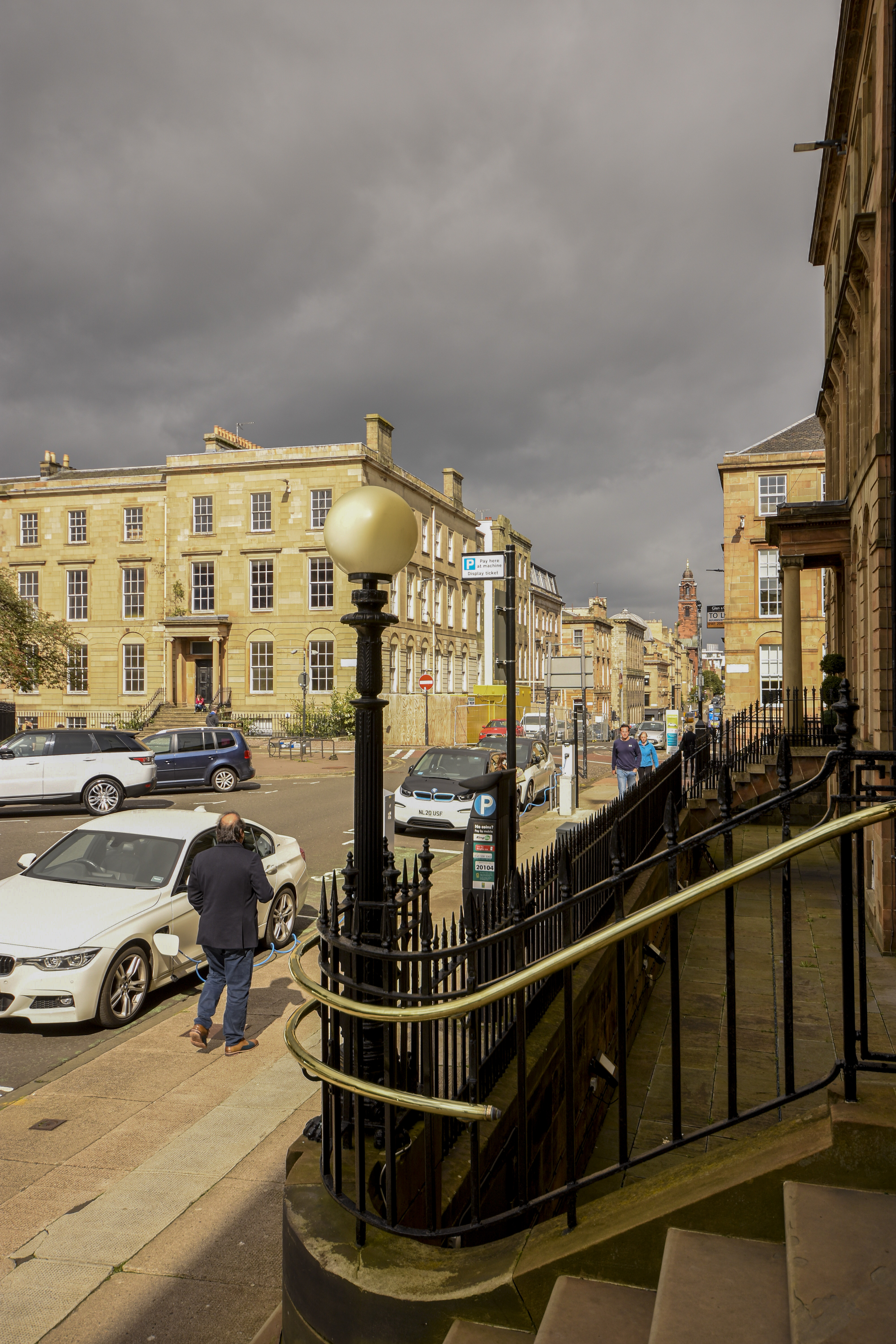
Blythswood Square, Glasgow, looking towards Bath Street and Garnethill.

Blythswood Square is the Georgian square on Blythswood Hill in the City of Glasgow, Scotland. The square is part of the 'New Town of Blythswood' built in the 1800s on the rising empty ground west of a very new Buchanan Street. These open grounds were part of the vast Lands of Blythswood stretching to the River Kelvin acquired by the Douglas-Campbell family in the 17th century. The Blythswood district, and its grid of streets, became a Conservation Area in 1970, because of its important architectural and historic buildings.

The square is one of the largest residential developments on Blythswood Hill on over 35 acres (14 ha) of ground.

== History ==
The square's land is part of 10 acres purchased from the Campbells of Blythswood in the 1790s by a calico-printer in Anderston who developed them as Willow Bank. In 1802 the land and mansion of Willow Bank were bought by "The Great Improver", William Harley, a Glasgow textile manufacturer and merchant. On the 10 acres Harley created and opened his Willowbank/Blythswood Pleasure Gardens with views over the Clyde and miles around. He also owned some of the hill to its north which he named as Garnethill. In 1804 Harley purchased directly from the Campbells 35 acres of Blythswood land immediately west of the new Buchanan Street, and became the prime developer of the New Town of Blythswood connecting to his land at the top of Blythswood Hill.

A street plan for the square was drawn up for William Harley by James Gillespie Graham, who was also architect for the Campbells, but it is thought the facades were ultimately designed by John Brash.

The four Georgian terraces forming the square are all Category B listed buildings and were completed in the 1820s by the trustees and successors of William Harley. Harley also developed his new business establishments at the east end of Bath Street, supplying piped water for Glasgow's citizens, creating the first indoor public baths in Scotland, and pioneering the largest and first hygienic milk dairy in Europe.

In 1895 the townhouse at no 5 became the home of the Lady Artists' Club, formed by the Glasgow Society of Lady Artists in 1882, being the first lady artists' club in Britain and the first residential club for women in Britain. The clubhouse was sold in 1971 to the Scottish Arts Council but the society now known as Glasgow Society of Women Artists continues today. The neighbouring house at the corner of Blythswood Street was the home of 21-year old Miss Madeleine Smith who was tried in the High Court in 1857 of poisoning her lover with arsenic. The trial was reported around the world; the jury reaching their conclusion that the charge against her was Not Proven.

From the 1900s the houses increasingly became offices and clubs, including on the eastern side the Royal Scottish Automobile Club, which was restyled by architect James Miller in 1923. In 2009 the Royal Scottish Automobile Club's premises opened as the 5 star Blythswood Square Hotel.

The Blythswood Square Proprietors association own and maintain the square's gardens in the central area. In past decades the gardens were open to office workers at lunchtimes, and are now available for use on a hire basis. An annual Glasgow Blythswood Festival commenced in 2024 linking major organisations and venues in the surrounding area

== Notable residents ==
- 3 - Sir James Anderson, Textile manufacturer and Lord Provost of Glasgow
- 5 - Dr John Burns Surgeon
- 5 - Sir Andrew Orr Manufacturing stationer and Lord Provost
- 7 - Madeleine Smith subject of the famous murder trial, daughter of architect James Smith
- 13 - Arthur Francis Stoddard founder of Stoddard Carpets
