= Glen-Coats baronets =

Extinct title in the UK

The Glen-Coats Baronetcy, of Ferguslie Park in the Parish of Abbey in the County of Renfrew, was a title in the Baronetage of the United Kingdom. It was created on 25 June 1894 for Thomas Glen-Coats, Director of the thread-making firm of J. & P. Coats, Ltd, and later Liberal Member of Parliament for Renfrewshire West. Born Thomas Coats, he assumed the additional surname of Glen, which was that of his maternal grandfather. He was succeeded by his son, the second Baronet. He won a gold medal in sailing at the 1908 Summer Olympics. The title became extinct on his death in 1954.

Two other members of the Coats family also gained distinction. George Coats, 1st Baron Glentanar, was the younger brother of the first Baronet, while Sir James Coats, 1st Baronet (see Coats baronets), was the first cousin of the first Baronet.

== Glen-Coats baronets, of Ferguslie Park (1894) ==
- Sir Thomas Glen Glen-Coats, 1st Baronet (1846–1922)
- Sir Thomas Coats Glen Glen-Coats, 2nd Baronet (1878–1954)

Coat of arms of Glen-Coats of Ferguslie Park
Crest 1st, An anchor erect Proper (Coats); 2nd, a Cornish chough Sable, beaked Gules (Glen). Escutcheon Quarterly, 1st and 4th: Or, a stag’s head erased Gules, between the attires a pheon Azure, all between three mascles Sable, a bordure engrailed of the Last (Coats); 2nd and 3rd: Ermine, three Cornish choughs Sable, beaked Gules. Motto Over crests, 1st: Be firm; 2nd: Deus alit corvos (God feed the ravens)

== See also ==
- Baron Glentanar

Baronetage of the United Kingdom
Preceded by Montagu baronets	Glen-Coats baronets of Ferguslie Park; 25 June 1894	Succeeded by Pearson baronets
