= Baron Glentanar =

Scottish noble family

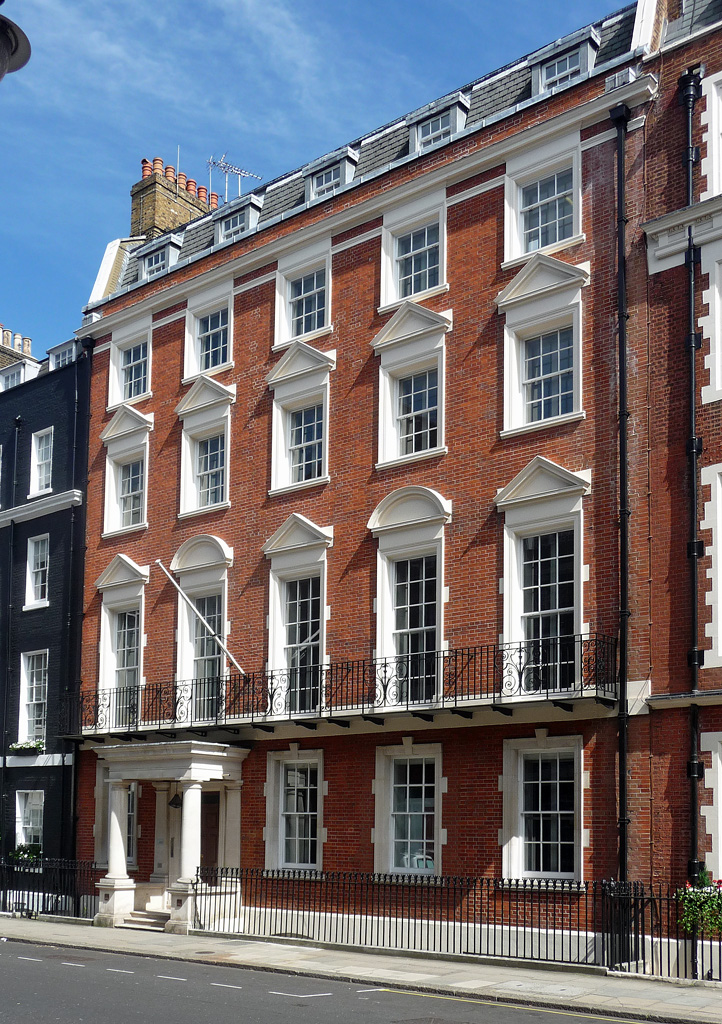
11 Hill Street, Mayfair — The London Townhouse of the Barons Glentanar during the early 20th century.

Baron Glentanar, of Glen Tanar in the County of Aberdeen, was a title in the Peerage of the United Kingdom. The family owned the Glen Tanar Estate in Aberdeenshire, and also town houses in Edinburgh, and Aberdeen. The barony was created on 29 June 1916 for George Coats. The title became extinct on the death of his son, the second Baron, in 1971.

The first Baron was the younger brother of Sir Thomas Glen-Coats, 1st Baronet, and a first cousin of Sir James Coats, 1st Baronet (see Coats baronets). Thomas was director of Coats Group in 1918; and previously he served in World War I as lieutenant as part of the Black Watch Royal regiment of Scotland, and as a signal sergeant. He became a justice of the peace for Aberdeenshire.

The London townhouse of the 1st and 2nd Barons Glentanar was No. 11 Hill Street, Mayfair. The lease of the house was purchased by the 1st Baron (known prior to his elevation to the Peerage as Mr George Coats) in 1907, and was eventually sold by the 2nd Baron in 1936; the unexpired term of the lease was 55 years at the time of the sale, with a ground rent payable of £350 annually.

== Barons Glentanar (1916) ==
- George Coats, 1st Baron Glentanar (1849–1918)
- Thomas Coats, 2nd Baron Glentanar (1894–1971)

Coat of arms of Baron Glentanar
Coronet Baron's coronet Crest An anchor erect Proper. Escutcheon Or, a stag’s head erased Gules, between the attires a pheon Azure, all between three mascles Sable, a bordure engrailed of the Last. Supporters On either side a stag Gules attired Or, between the attires a pheon Azure. Motto Non dormit qui custodit (He sleepeth not who keepth awake)

== See also ==
- Glen-Coats baronets
- Coats baronets
