= Alfred M. Coats =

Scottish-American businessman (1869–1942)

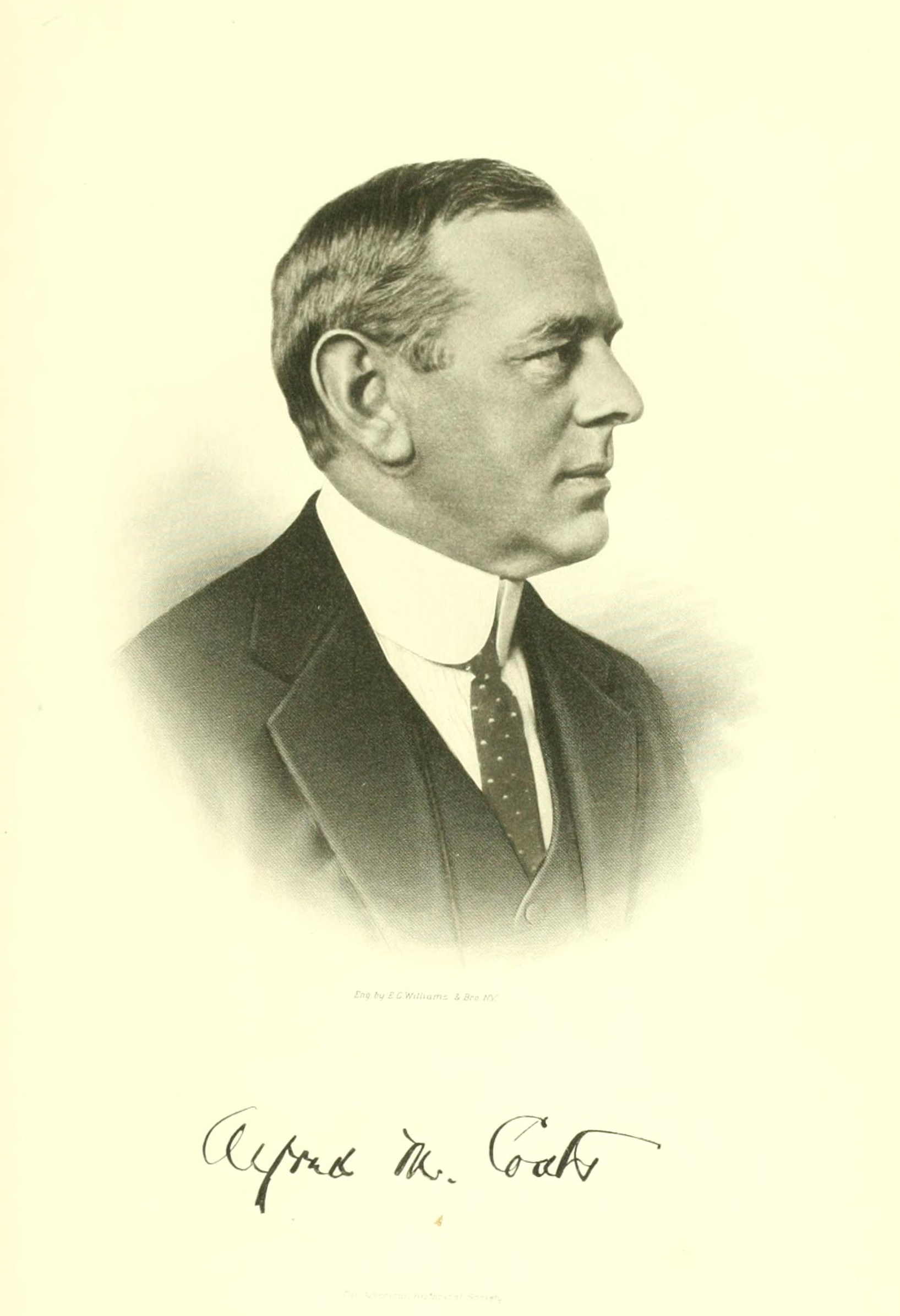
- Engraving published 1920
- Born: April 12, 1869; Paisley, Scotland
- Died: July 21, 1942 (aged 73); Nayatt, Rhode Island

Alfred M. Coats (April 12, 1869 – July 21, 1942) was a Scottish-born American businessman who served as general manager of the J. & P. Coats plant in Pawtucket and as Rhode Island’s Federal Food Administrator during World War I.

== Early life and education ==
Alfred M. Coats was born in Paisley, Scotland, on April 12, 1869, to James P. Coats, a member of a prominent family in the Scottish textile industry, and to Sarah Ann Auchincloss, whose father traded Coats threads in the United States. Alfred M. Coats lived the majority of his life in the United States, where his parents returned to in 1871. His father became the first Baronet of Auchendrane in 1905, a title that passed to his brother in 1913.

Coats attended St. Paul’s School in New Hampshire and graduated from Yale University in 1891. He was among the founding members of the Yale Club in Providence in 1901 and later served as its president.

== Career ==
Alfred M. Coats played a significant part in Rhode Island economic life, not only as an operative of "one of Britain's most important multinational companies" (today the Coats Group), but also as an investor in local textile, gas, and bank entities.

=== At the helm of J. & P. Coats in Pawtucket (1894–1910) ===
Coats oversaw 2,200 to 2,500 workers as general manager of the J. & P. Coats company plant in Pawtucket from 1902 to 1910. Before taking on this role, he had served as a director of the Conant Thread Company, a J & P Coats subsidiary, since 1896.

Coats faced at least three mass labor movements, in 1902, 1907, and 1910, all focused on wages and the pace of labor in the mills. On May 25, 1902, employees at the plant went on strike over a reduction of their wages that coincided with the implementation of the "58-hour law". Coats met with the strikers' representatives, including "the recently formed branch of the United Textile Workers" and the Rhode Island Mule Spinners' Association. "He was guaranteed," the Providence News reported, "that the strikers who went out unorganized and would return as a union would take the proper course in the future for presenting their grievances." Nonetheless, in a letter published by the Providence Journal in 1904, Coats formally refused to engage in salary negotiations with union representatives: "We feel that matters of this nature can be settled much more satisfactorily among ourselves than the employment of any outside agency."

The Providence Journal reported about 750 workers on strike and another 750 out of work in 1907. Coats awaited instructions from Scotland to engage in negotiations, but ultimately received approval from the board for a 10% wage increase. "The numerous conferences between the strikers' committee and Alfred M. Coats, the Superintendent, have been free from rancor," the journal reported, "and Mr. Coats has indicated every desire to bring about a satisfactory adjustment of the differences." While not unionized, the "carding room employees" who lead the strike received guidance from John Golden, President of the United Textile Workers of America.

In January of 1910, strikers, only partially affiliated with unions, demanded that their wages not be lowered in the wake of a new labor law which limited the work week to 56 hours. Coats refused to negotiate and threatened to close the mills "indefinitely," demanding that "formal notice of any dissatisfaction [...] be presented to the management" after work resumed. Union leaders and some of the employees urged the non-affiliated "back boys" who had initiated the strike to return to work. Coats tended his resignation at the beginning of February. The strike continued through most of March as the company directorate refused to grant any demands.

=== Other business interests ===
Coats, in conjunction with or separately from his role at J. & P. Coats, had investments across a range of sectors.

In December 1897 he co-founded the Punch River Textile Company and the French River Textile Company (the latter with a woolen mill at Mechanicsville, CT). He was one of the directors of the Manufacturer's Mutual Fire Insurance Company of R.I. Later on, he also served as Vice President of the Lorraine Manufacturing Company.

In 1902, he held the title of Vice President of the Board of Trustees of the Pawtucket Institution for Savings. He was elected a member of the Board of Directors of the Slater Trust Company in 1908. From 1917 to 1933, he appears listed in annual meeting reports published in the Providence Journal as a member of the Board of Directors of the Industrial Trust Company, the latter remembered for its iconic 1928 "Superman Building" in Downtown Providence.

After serving on the Board of Directors of the Pawtucket Gas Company, he participated in the incorporation of the Blackstone Valley Gas and Electric Company in 1909, which merged into the Narragansett Electric Company in 2000 and operates under the name of Rhode Island Energy since 2022.

== Civic activity ==
Coats and his wife appeared regularly in the society pages of R.I. newspapers as patrons and organizers.

=== Charities and public health ===
The couple were inducted as life members of the American Red Cross in 1905. Elizabeth Barnewall Coats served on the executive board with Alfred M. Coats as chairman of the June 1917 campaign committee, when the R.I. branch raised over $879,576.07 as part of a national drive for a $100,000,000 war fund. The "remarkable result," Coats said, "convinced him that at least a great majority of the people of Rhode Island are now beginning to realize the tremendous gravity of the war, and that this is only its beginning for America."

The couple were also elected members of the Corporation of the Rhode Island Hospital in 1905, and Elizabeth Barnewall Coats joined the Board of Directors of the Providence District Nursing Association.

During WWI, Elizabeth Barnewall Coats lead fundraising efforts for the Edith Wharton Charity in Rhode Island, for example to support "orphan children and helpless aged people in Flanders" and endow a 14-bed ward in tuberculosis hospitals in France. Alfred M. Coats served as President of the Providence Society for Organizing Charity, which helped hundreds of widows and families in need.

=== Cultural and social organizations ===
Elizabeth Barnewall Coats played an active role at the turn of the century in the leadership of the R.I. Exchange for Women's Work, which funded and managed the operations of a market for women-made goods.

Elizabeth Barnewall Coats served as a director and officer of the Providence Athenaeum between 1918 and 1925, donating acquisition funds and "books on gardens" such as Jean-Henri Fabre's The Wonder Book of Plant Life (trans. Bernard Miall, Philadelphia: Lippincott Company).

=== Politics ===
A member of the Republican Party, Alfred M. Coats supported the re-election campaign of George Peabody Wetmore as U.S. Senator in 1907, opposing the bid of Industrial Trust Company founder Samuel P. Colt. The Coats' winter home at 13 Brown Street, leased to R. Livingston Beeckman, became the R.I. Governor's Mansion from 1915 to 1921. In the United Kingdom, his brother Sir Stuart Auchincloss Coats was a Conservative Member of Parliament from 1916 to 1922.

Elizabeth Barnewall Coats was elected to serve among the directors of the newly formed R.I. chapter of the League of Women Voters at the 1919 suffragist convention that took place at Churchill House (built 1907 for the R.I. Women's Club).

=== Wartime food administrator ===
Alfred M. Coats volunteered as the R.I. Food Administrator from the end of 1917 to the beginning of 1919. Coats "saw in [the role] an opportunity to do some real service" in a "consuming state" that imported "between 90% and 95% of its foodstuffs." He was appointed by Governor Beeckman with the endorsement of the federal administration. Much of the job consisted of creating awareness, incentives, and rules for "substituting, reducing and conserving foods," but also involved advising on the distribution of primary goods and, in some instances, revoking the commercial licenses of businesses that contravened wartime regulations.

== Personal life ==
In 1895, he married Elizabeth (Bessie) Barnewall. Lydia Field Emmet painted portraits of their daughter Mabel in 1904 and Mrs. Alfred M. Coats in 1906. They had a son, Archibald, who died serving in France in 1918, and another daughter, Elizabeth.

The Coats commissioned two homes from architect Ogden Codman, Jr.: a summer residence in Newport in 1895–1896 and a winter home in Providence, at 13 Brown Street, in 1900–1901. In 1916, the Coats moved to 77 Williams Street, a residence previously owned by James Coats, and in 1926, had a new home designed by Clarke & Howe and built at 175 Upton Avenue.
