= Francis Sheed Anderson =

Scottish businessman and politician

Francis Sheed Anderson CB (28 February 1897 – 12 September 1966), was a Scottish businessman, civil servant and Liberal Party politician.

== Background ==
He was the son of James Anderson, of Aberdeen. He was educated at Aberdeen Grammar School. He married, in 1921, Helen Forbes Wattie, of Strathdon, Aberdeenshire. They had no children. In 1949, he was awarded a Companion of the Order of the Bath.

== World War One ==
In 1914, he served in the World War I. In 1917, he served in the Indian Army. In 1919, he retired with the rank of captain.

== Professional career ==
In 1920, he became a company director. He became involved as a director with a number of Scottish companies. In 1929, he was a director for Aberdeen Granite Manufacturers, the family business. In 1933, he became President of the Aberdeen Granite Manufacturers Association, serving for three years. In 1940, he became Divisional Food Officer for North East Scotland. In 1943, he became Director of Fish Supplies at the Ministry of Food. In 1946, he became Under Secretary at the Ministry of Food. In 1949, he was appointed Chairman of the International Wheat Council, serving for 10 years. In 1954, he became Executive Director of the International Sugar Council. In 1960, he became Director of the British Sugar Corporation Ltd. In 1964, he became Chairman of the Bacon Market Council.

== Political career ==
In 1929, he was vice-Chairman of South Aberdeen Liberal Association. In May 1929, he was selected as Liberal candidate for the West Renfrewshire Division for the 1929 General Election. It was not a promising seat and there had been no Liberal candidate at the previous election.

General Election 1929: Renfrewshire West Electorate 37,947
Party	Candidate	Votes	%	±%
Labour	Robert Forgan	14,419	46.5	
Unionist	Alexander Thomson Taylor	12,183	39.4	
Liberal	Francis Sheed Anderson	2,682	8.7	n/a
SNP	Roland Eugene Muirhead	1,667	5.4	n/a
Majority		2,236		
Turnout			81.6	
Labour gain from Unionist		Swing		

He did not stand for parliament again. In 1935, he was elected to Aberdeen Town Council, serving for five years. In 1935, he became a justice of the peace for the City of Aberdeen, serving for 18 years. In 1935, he was appointed to the Aberdeen Harbour Board, serving for five years.
