= J & P Coats =

J & P Coats may refer to the former names of:

- The Pawtucket Rangers, an American soccer club
- Coats Group, a British textile company
