= Renshaw baronets =

Baronetcy in the Baronetage of the United Kingdom

The Renshaw Baronetcy, of Coldharbour in Wivelsfield in the County of Sussex, is a title in the Baronetage of the United Kingdom. It was created on 7 January 1903 for Charles Renshaw. He was Unionist Party Member of Parliament for Renfrewshire West from 1892 to 1906. and acted as Chairman of A. F. Stoddard and Co. and the Caledonian Railway Company.

== Renshaw baronets, of Coldharbour (1903) ==
- Sir Charles Bine Renshaw, 1st Baronet (1848–1918)
- Sir (Charles) Stephen Bine Renshaw, 2nd Baronet (1883–1976)
- Sir (Charles) Maurice Bine Renshaw, 3rd Baronet (1912–2002)
- Sir (John) David Bine Renshaw, 4th Baronet (born 1945) He was in 2015 a member of the Executive Committee of the Standing Council of the Baronetage.

The heir apparent is the present holder's son Thomas Renshaw (born 1976).

== Notes ==
Baronetage of the United Kingdom
Preceded by Banbury baronets	Renshaw baronets of Coldharbour; 7 January 1903	Succeeded by Prevost baronets
