= George Coats, 1st Baron Glentanar =

Scottish noble and landowner

George Coats, 1st Baron Glentanar (11 February 1849 – 26 November 1918), was a Scottish cotton manufacturer.

== Background ==
Coats was the son of Thomas Coats and Margaret Glen, daughter of Thomas Glen, of Thornhill Johnstone, Renfrewshire. He was the younger brother of Sir Thomas Glen-Coats, 1st Baronet, and a first cousin of Sir James Coats, 1st Baronet.

== Life and career ==
Coats was the owner of a cotton firm in Paisley. He acquired the Glen Tanar Estate in Aberdeenshire in 1905. In 1916 he was raised to the peerage as Baron Glentanar, of Glen Tanar in the County of Aberdeen. He owned the Belleisle estate near Aboyne, Aberdeenshire for over 30 years until 1918, when it was sold for £25,000.

In 1907 he purchased a long lease of a large London townhouse, No. 11 Hill Street, Mayfair, which had previously served as the town residence of the Duke of Newcastle.

=== Wealth and estate ===
According to his will written in on 2 April 1919, his total estate net worth had been quoted with at £4,334,224 and twelve shillings (equivalent to £266,700,000 in 2023).

Under the terms of Lord Glentanar's (as Coat's was known after his elevation to the peerage in 1916) will, his son received all of his heritable (settled) real estate in England and Scotland, as well as 60% of the residuary personal estate. The will also provided for a 2,000 immediate payment and a dower annuity of £25,000 for life to his widow, Lady Glentanar. The Dowager Lady Glentanar also received a life interest in the couple's London residence No. 11 Hill Street, as well as Craigedinny House in Aberdeenshire and the Belleisle estate in Ayr.

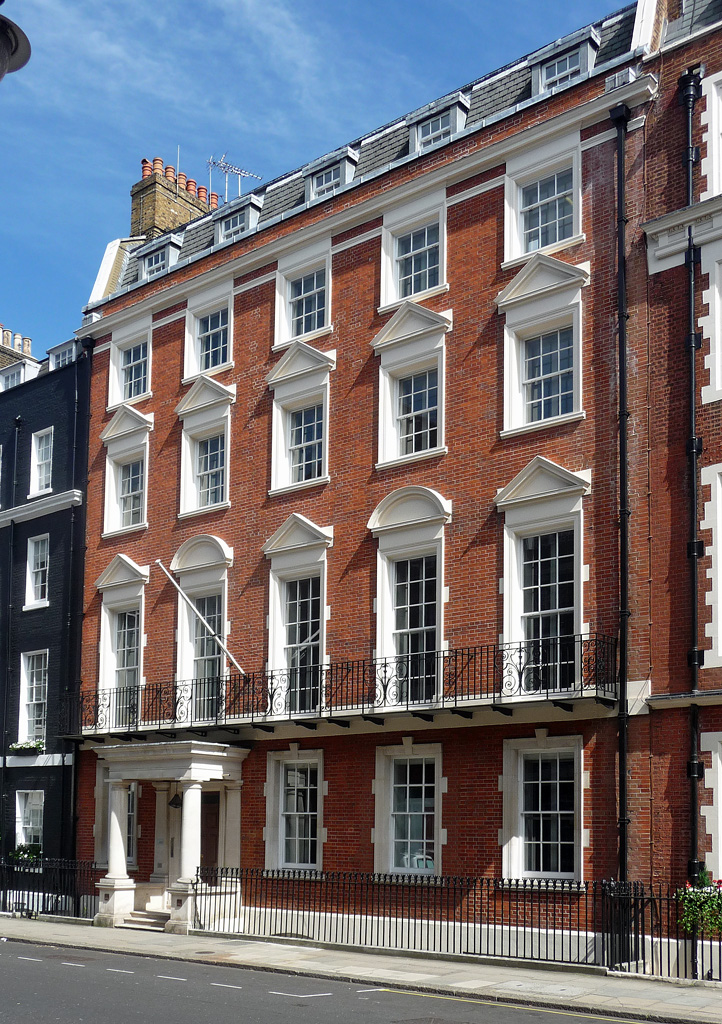
11 Hill Street, Mayfair — The London Townhouse of the Barons Glentanar during the early 20th century.

== Family ==
Lord Glentanar married Margaret Lothian Black, daughter of James Tait Black, of Underscar, Keswick, Cumberland. They had one son and two daughters. The elder daughter, the Honourable Lilian Maud, married the 5th Duke of Wellington, while the younger daughter, the Honourable Charlotte Margaret, married as her first husband William Walrond. He died in November 1918, aged 69, and was succeeded in the barony by his only son, Thomas. Lady Glentanar died in July 1935. A monument to his memory was erected in 1919 in St Thomas's Episcopal Church in Aboyne designed by Sir Robert Lorimer.

Peerage of the United Kingdom
New creation	Baron Glentanar; 1916–1918	Succeeded by Thomas Coats
