= McInnes Shaw =

British politician (1895–1957)

Colonel Sir Archibald Douglas McInnes Shaw, DSO (15 March 1895 – 10 June 1957) was a Scottish soldier, businessman and Unionist Party politician. He served in both World Wars, and sat in the House of Commons from 1924 to 1929.

== Career ==
Shaw was the son of Sir Archibald McInnes Shaw, the Lord Provost of Glasgow from 1908 to 1911. He was educated at St Ninian's School, Moffat and then at Charterhouse. He joined the Royal Scots Fusiliers when World War I broke out in 1914, and was twice mentioned in dispatches and awarded the Distinguished Service Order (DSO). After the war he continued to serve in the Territorial Army, and was given the brevet rank of Colonel in 1928.

He worked with an iron foundry business in Glasgow becoming its chairman, and was elected to Glasgow City Council in 1921.

Shaw unsuccessfully contested Paisley at the 1923 general election. He was selected to contest the seat at the next election, and as prospective candidate he nursed the constituency during 1924. However, just before nominations closed on 18 October, he withdrew in order to give the sitting Liberal Party Member of Parliament (MP), former Prime Minister H. H. Asquith, a straight fight with the Labour Party candidate. His withdrawal from Paisley opened the way for a wider pact between Liberals and Conservatives across Scotland, and Shaw was promptly nominated in Western Renfrewshire.

He defeated the sitting Labour MP Robert Murray, becoming the MP for Western Renfrewshire for the next five years, but did not defend the seat at the 1929 general election, telling his local Unionist Association that his decision was for business reasons.

He contested Glasgow Bridgeton at the 1935 general election, and Glasgow Springburn at a by-election in September 1937, but was unsuccessful on both occasions. From 1924 to 1946 he was Grand Master of the Orange Lodge of Scotland and in his last three years of office was elected Imperial Grand Master of Great Britain and the Dominions.

In 1935 he became chairman of the Alhambra Theatre Glasgow. He resumed active service in the Army in World War II, commanding the 64th Anti-Tank Regiment before moving to the 19th Light Anti-Aircraft Regiment in 1941.

On moving to Symington, Ayrshire he was elected a councillor and became Convenor of Ayrshire County Council. He was knighted in 1953 for political and public services, and died on 10 June 1957, aged 62.

Parliament of the United Kingdom
Preceded by Robert Murray	Member of Parliament for Western Renfrewshire; 1924 – 1929	Succeeded by Robert Forgan
