= Robert Murray (co-operator) =

Scottish politician (1869–1950)

Robert Murray (30 June 1869 – 9 August 1950) was a Scottish co-operator and politician who served briefly in Parliament as a member of the Labour Party.

== Early life ==
Murray came from Bridgeton in Glasgow and in his early life worked as a Brass finisher and a pattern maker. He later moved to being a bookseller, journalist and author and settled in Barrhead. In 1894 he was elected to Neilston Parish Council, on which he served for nearly thirty years; he also became a Justice of the Peace for Renfrewshire. Prominent in the Cooperative movement he was sub-editor of its journal Scottish Co-operator.

== Parliamentary elections ==
At the general election of 1918, Murray stood for West Renfrewshire as a Labour Party candidate, having been sponsored by the Independent Labour Party. With 7,126 votes, he was not elected but came within 4,500 of the sitting Coalition Liberal MP. Murray was reselected to stand at the next election, and when it was called in November 1922 he won the West Renfrewshire seat by 11,787 to 10,051.

== In Parliament ==
Murray's maiden speech in Parliament criticised the Government for "colouring information" which it gave to the public, and manipulating the press; it followed an incident in which the National Unemployed Workers' Movement had organised a march and the Government had given out biographies of the leaders to the press with an instruction not to identify the source of the information. In April 1923 Murray moved a motion in Parliament calling for more middle-class professional workers to form trade unions and associations for collective bargaining; the Government did not oppose his motion and it was agreed to by the House of Commons. Murray retained his seat in the 1923 general election with a majority of 3,302 over the Conservative candidate with the Liberals in third. He spoke in favour of the Guardianship of Infants Bill, which gave mothers equal legal authority with fathers, making a witty speech which observed that women's knowledge that they had no legal rights made them get their own way "in other directions".

== 1924 election ==
When the 1924 general election was called, Murray faced a single opponent in Lt Col McInnes Shaw (Conservative) as the Liberal Party decided not to stand. There had been negotiations between the Liberals and Conservatives for an electoral pact which centred on the neighbouring Paisley seat held by H. H. Asquith and McInnes Shaw, who had been adopted as the Conservative candidate there, retired and came forward instead to challenge Murray. In the circumstances it was thought likely that McInnes Shaw would take most of the Liberal vote and therefore win the seat, and this proved to be the case: Murray was beaten by 2,015.

== Later life ==
Out of Parliament Murray became editor of Scottish Co-operator, and from 1927 to 1939 he was a Director of the Scottish Cooperative Wholesale Society. Murray was a member of the Evangelical Union Congregational Church;.

His wife, Margaret Brown McKinlay died in 1944. His son was Dr David Stark Murray who became President of the Socialist Medical Association and a leading advocate of the national health service. He had three daughters. The youngest, Marion, married Neil Maclean, the son of the MP for Govan who was also called Neil Maclean.

Parliament of the United Kingdom
Preceded by James Greig	Member of Parliament for West Renfrewshire; 1922–1924	Succeeded by McInnes Shaw
