= Coats Group =

British multinational sewing supply company

Coats Group plc
- Type: Public limited company
- Traded as: LSE: COA; FTSE 250 component
- Industry: Consumer and intermediate goods
- Founded: 1755; 271 years ago
- Headquarters: London, England, UK
- Key people: David Gosnell Chairman; David Paja, CEO; Jackie Callaway, CFO
- Products: Textile related
- Revenue: ▲US$1,464.9 million (2025)
- Operating income: ▲US$289.8 million (2025)
- Net income: ▲US$121.2 million (2025)
- Website: www.coats.com

Coats Group plc is a British multinational company. The company provides products, including apparel, accessory and footwear threads, structural components for footwear and accessories, fabrics, yarns, and software applications.

Coats is listed on the London Stock Exchange and is a constituent of the FTSE 250 Index and FTSE4Good Index. Revenues in 2023 were $1.4bn.

== Founding ==
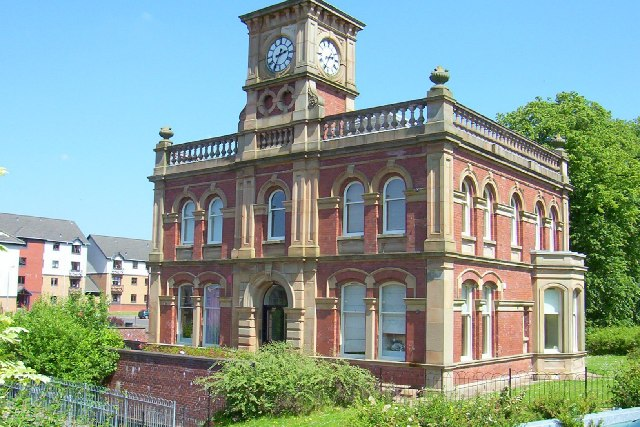
Ferguslie Thread Mills

Paisley, Scotland became a hub for the textile industry in the United Kingdom. In 1755 James and Patrick Clark began a loom equipment and silk thread business. In 1806, Patrick Clark invented a way of twisting strands of cotton together to substitute for silk that was unavailable due to the French blockade of Great Britain. He opened the first plant for manufacturing the cotton thread in 1812.

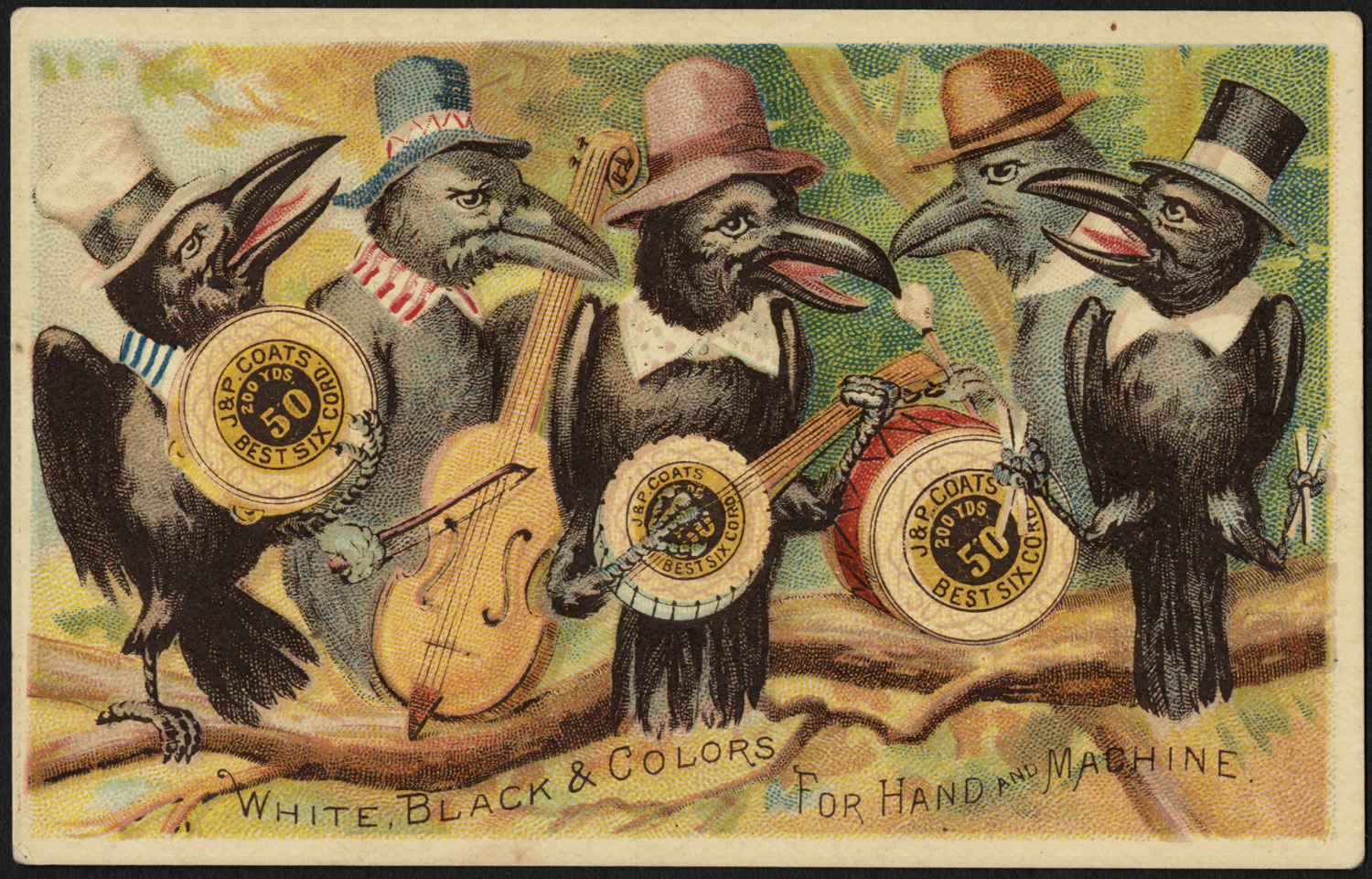
1887 chromolithograph advertisement for J & P. Coats Best Six Cord thread by Donaldson Brothers

In 1802 James Coats set up his own weaving in Paisley. In 1826 he opened a cotton mill at Ferguslie to produce his own thread and, when he retired in 1830, his sons, James & Peter, took up the business under the name of J. & P. Coats.

In 1890 Coats listed on the London Stock Exchange, with capital of £5.7 million.

== Implantation in the United States ==
The firm expanded internationally, particularly to the United States. In 1869, J. & P. Coats signed a contract with the Conant Thread Company in Pawtucket, Rhode Island, which entitled them to use of the Conant company's manufacturing facilities. This move towards local production in the United States was primarily driven by high tariffs on imported goods, including thread.

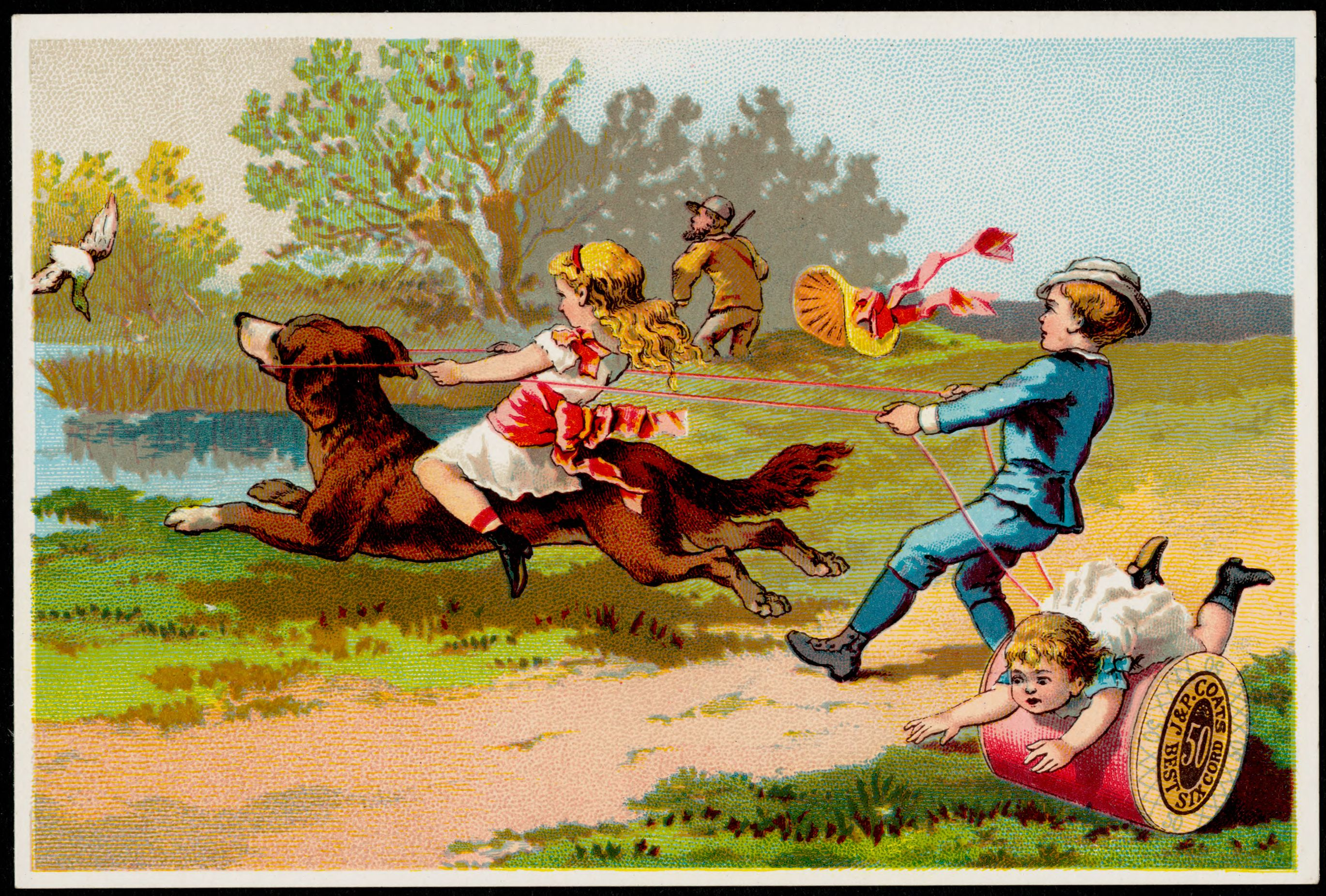
J & P. Coats Best Six Cord 50, ca. 1870-1900; from the 19th Century American Trade Cards collection of the Boston Public Library

In 1893, J. & P. Coats absorbed the Conant Thread Company and assumed direct control over the Pawtucket plant, under the management of James Coats (1834–1913) and Alfred M. Coats (1869–1942). In 1896 J. and P. Coats acquired controlling interests in the firms of Clark and Co, Jonas Brook and Brothers, and James Chadwick and Brother. The Clark family had manufacturing sites in Newark, New Jersey, U.S. as the Clark Thread Co. since 1864.

J & P Coats moved their base of operations to Delaware in 1951 and officially closed the plant in Pawtucket in November 1964.

== Mergers and consolidation ==
In 1952, J. & P. Coats and the Clark Thread Co. merged to become Coats & Clark's. In 1961, a merger with Patons and Baldwins created Coats Patons. By the mid-1960s, Coats Patons decided to invest in the Philippines by initiating a joint venture with Tan Heng Chai of the Marikina-based Manila Bay Spinning Mills, Inc. called J. & P. Coats Manila Bay, Inc.

In 1986, a merger with Vantona Viyella created Coats Viyella. In 2003 Guinness Peat took Coats private and in 2015 the business returned to the market as Coats Group.

Coats was fined €110 million by the European Commission in 2007 for participation in cartels with Prym, YKK, and other companies to fix and manipulate the prices of zips and other fasteners, and of the machinery to make them. One of the cartels ran for twenty-one years. An appeal in 2012 to the General Court of the European Union was dismissed, and the fine upheld.

The company acquired the footwear components business, Texon, in July 2022, and the footwear reinforcement components business, Rhenoflex, in August 2022.

== See also ==
- Thomas Coats (1809–1883)
- Sir Peter Coats of Auchendrane (1808–1890)
- Sir James Coats, 1st Baronet (1834–1913)
- Sir Thomas Glen-Coats, 1st Baronet (1846–1922)
- Conant Thread-Coats & Clark Mill Complex District in Pawtucket, Rhode Island, listed on the U.S. National Register of Historic Places
- Alfred M. Coats (1869–1942)
