= Coach and Horses, Hill Street =

Pub in Mayfair, London

Coach and Horses
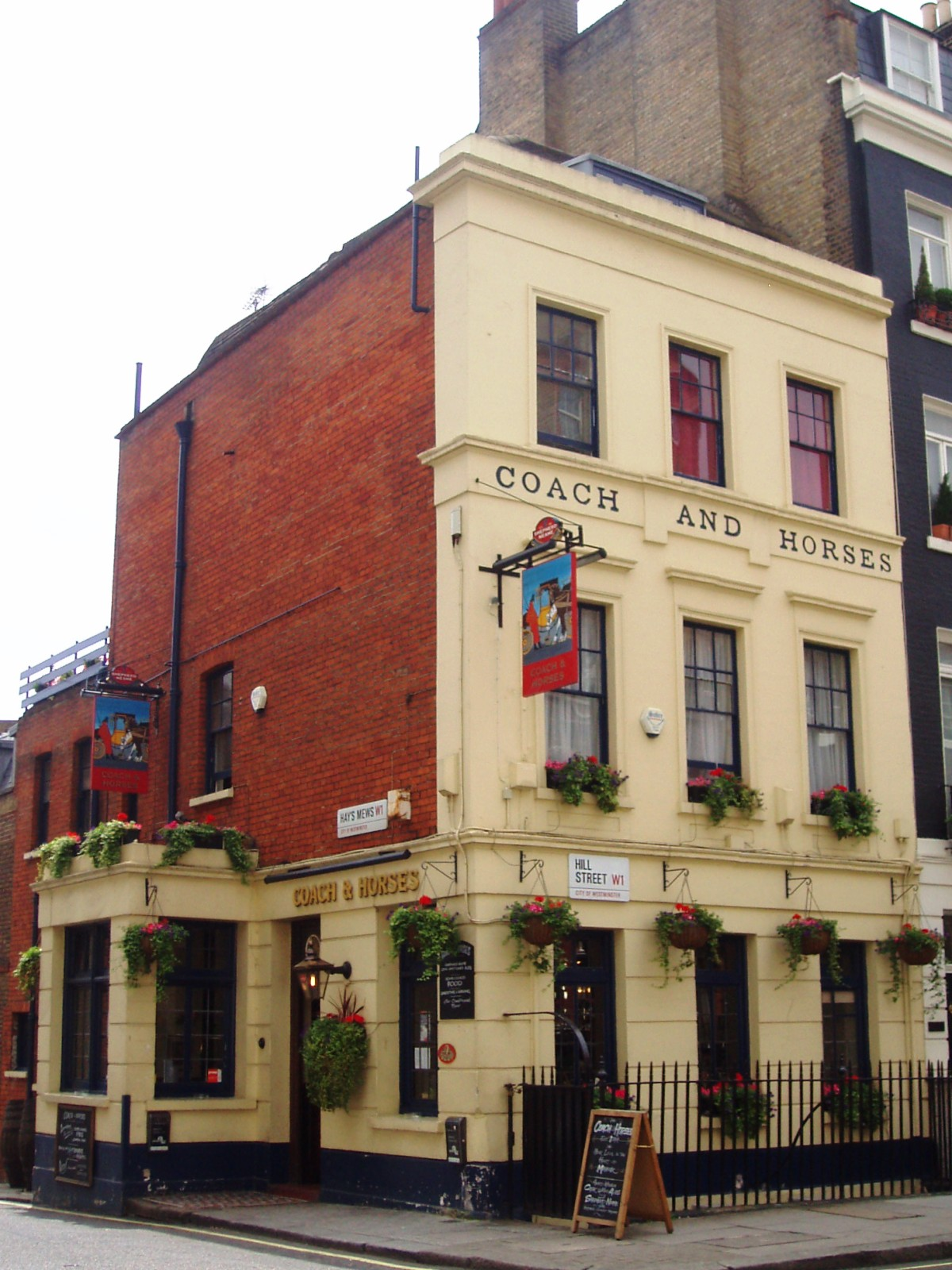
- The Coach and Horses
- Type: Public house
- Location: 5 Hill Street, Mayfair, London
- Coordinates: 51°30′33″N 0°8′50″W

Listed Building – Grade II
- Official name: COACH AND HORSES PUBLIC HOUSE
- Designated: 01-Dec-1987
- Reference no.: 1357097

The Coach and Horses is a Grade II listed public house at 5 Hill Street, Mayfair, London. It dates from the 1740s.

There is another Coach and Horses pub in Mayfair, on Bruton Street.
