= Charles Renshaw =

British politician

Charles Bine Renshaw
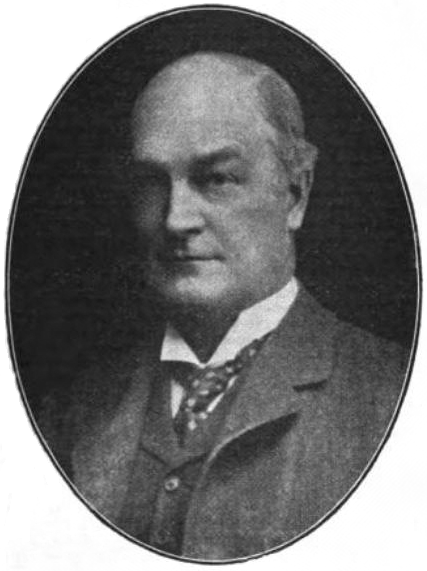

Member of Parliament
- In office 1892–1906
- Constituency: West Renfrewshire

Personal details
- Born: 9 December 1848 Sussex, England
- Died: 6 March 1918 (aged 69) Barochan, Renfrewshire, Scotland
- Party: Conservative and Unionist
- Spouse: Mary Stoddard (m. 1872)
- Occupation: Businessman, politician

Sir Charles Bine Renshaw, 1st Baronet (9 December 1848 – 6 March 1918) was a Scottish Conservative and Unionist Party politician.

== Biography ==
He was born in Sussex and came to Glasgow in 1870 to work in a senior position with Stoddard Carpets, marrying the boss's daughter, Mary Stoddard, two years later. In 1882 he took over Stoddard Carpets International, founded by his father-in-law, Arthur Francis Stoddard.

He was elected at the 1892 general election as the member of parliament (MP) for West Renfrewshire, and held the seat until he retired from Parliament at the 1906 general election.

He was created a Baronet in 1903, of Coldharbour, Surrey.

He was later chairman of the Caledonian Railway Company.

He was succeeded by his son Sir Charles Stephen Bine Renshaw 2nd.

Charles Renshaw died in Barochan, Renfrewshire on 6 March 1918, is buried near the family home in Elderslie.

Parliament of the United Kingdom
Preceded by Sir Archibald Campbell, Bt	Member of Parliament for West Renfrewshire; 1892–1906	Succeeded by Sir Thomas Glen-Coats, Bt
Baronetage of the United Kingdom
New creation	Baronet (of Coldharbour); 1903–1918	Succeeded by (Charles) Stephen Bine Renshaw
