= Inkerman, Renfrewshire =

Coordinates: 55.85472°N 4.46075°W

Inkerman was a small hamlet set up in 1858 in the Abbey Parish of Paisley to house ironstone miners. Later employment came from ancillary operations, including shale coal and oilworks. Inkerman has a total of seven pits. The hamlet was named after a recent (1854) British military victory, the Battle of Inkerman, in the Crimean War. Similarly, the nearby Balaklava settlement housed miners for the Clippens mines (now in Linwood) from 1855. The hamlet of Redan was named to commemorate the storming of the fortifications - Redan - in the Siege of Sevastopol (1854–1855). The miners from these settlements had their own rivalries. On Saturday 12 July 1859 the miners from The Redan in Linwood, on one side of the Black Cart Water, and their rivals from Inkerman, on the other side, met in the (grandly called) Battle of Linwood Bridge. (The bridge is still there at the end of Bridge Street, Linwood). The men were armed with various weapons such as mining tools, swords and cudgels. A bloody battle was fought resulting in the death of one man and several others were badly injured

Inkerman was near Candrens, where Blackstone Road passes under the A737. It consisted of three rows of cottages (built by the mine owners Merry & Cunninghame Ltd) called Row One, Row Two and Row Three, plus a shop, a school and a schoolhouse. The school and schoolhouse still exist, the latter as a private house. A reading room was attached to the school. A Church of Scotland Mission Hall was erected and later the Inkerman Bowling Club (which still exists, on the Blackstoun Road) was formed. As the population increased, Oilwork Row and Store Row were added to the so-called "miners' raws" (sic). The Store was company-run, and much credit was extended to miners, often against the law (the Truck Acts). The Store was also the Post Office. The population of the hamlet grew from 723 (1871), to 948 (1881). As the mines became exhausted the population began to decline - for example to 699 (1891). There was an oilwork, (The Walkinshaw Oil Company) extracting oil from the shale, and a brickwork (part of Merry and Cunninghame's operation) was established to make bricks from the shale waste, - the blaes - but this disappeared with the mining industry. People drifted away and the last of the "miners’ raws" was demolished in the 1940s. Inkerman is no longer listed on maps but can be found on the historic Ordnance Survey series, as can Balaklava near Clippens.
