= January Club =

British Union of Fascists discussion organisation

The January Club was a discussion group founded in 1934 by Oswald Mosley to attract Establishment support for the movement known as the British Union of Fascists.

The club was under the effective control of Robert Forgan, working on behalf of the BUF. The founders as identified by MI5 were Forgan, Donald Makgill, Francis Yeats-Brown and Henry William 'Billy' Luttman-Johnson. Members of the January Club included military historian B. H. Liddell Hart, Wing-Commander Sir Louis Greig, Lord Erskine, a Conservative and Unionist MP and assistant Government whip, Lord William Montagu-Douglas-Scott, brother of the 8th Duke of Buccleuch and Conservative and Unionist MP, and (according to Nigel H. Jones' biography of Mosley) Lord and Lady Russell of Liverpool.

Sir Charles Petrie, who participated in the club's early stages, discusses the club at some length (and offers criticisms of Mosley's methods) in his 1972 memoir, A Historian Looks at his World. The poet and editor John Collings Squire was another author initially involved with the club but "found the atmosphere uncongenial before long". Petrie's memoir also mentions Yeats-Brown as soon complaining: "The January Club will probably collapse; anyway I'm not going to the next meeting. Mosley is not human enough."

== Sources ==
- Barberis, Peter (et al), Encyclopedia of British and Irish Political Organizations Retrieved July 2012
- Jones, Nigel, Mosley Retrieved July 2012
