= Conant Thread-Coats & Clark Mill Complex District =

Historic district in Rhode Island, United States

- U.S. National Register of Historic Places
- U.S. Historic district
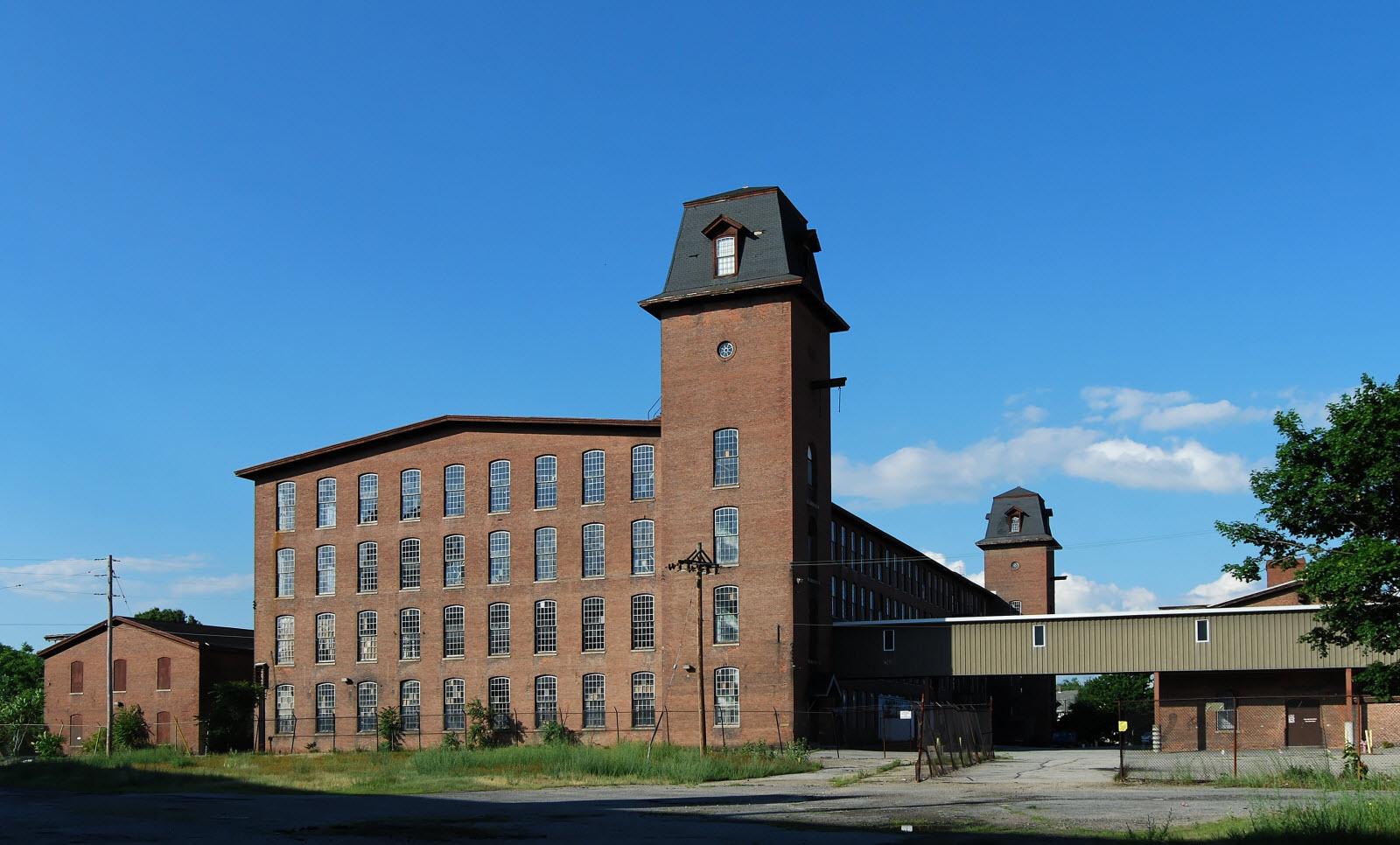

- Location within Rhode Island Location within the United States
- Location: 5 Carpenter St., 200 Conant St., 457 Lonsdale Ave., 390-400 Pine St., Pawtucket, Rhode Island; 430 Pine St., 280 Rand St., Central Falls
- Coordinates: 41.88117°N 71.39695°W
- Area: 50 acres (20 ha)
- Built: 1868
- MPS: Pawtucket MRA
- NRHP reference No.: 83003809
- Added to NRHP: November 18, 1983

The Conant Thread—Coats & Clark Mill Complex District is a historic district encompassing a large industrial complex which straddles the border between Pawtucket and Central Falls, Rhode Island.

== Construction ==
This 50-acre (20 ha) industrial area was developed in two phases, with a number of buildings surviving from both of these periods. The first, between 1870 and 1882, resulted in the construction of Mills 2 through 5, a series of large three- and four-story brick buildings which were used in textile manufacturing. A brick office and stables from this period were demolished in 1977, and are the only known brick structures to have been lost.

The second phase of construction was between 1917 and 1923, and included the construction of two additional four-story brick mills, a stuccoed recreation hall that has since been converted into a senior center, two two-story brick buildings, and a power plant.

The complex was listed on the National Register of Historic Places in 1983. It was extensively damaged by fire, with at least eight buildings gutted and destroyed, on 14 March 2020.

== Ownership ==
The plant was controlled by the Conant Thread Company until 1869, when J. & P. Coats, a Scottish thread company, assumed control over the manufacturing facilities. Shortly after the takeover, the Coats company expanded the capacities of the plant and constructed additional mills to increase production and facilitate the production of yarn: by the 1880s, the plant was worth about £770,000.

The Coats Mill was for many years Pawtucket’s largest employer, the labor force growing from 550 employees in 1870, to 1,500 in 1877, up to 2,500 employees in 1910. At the peak of the plant’s capacity in the 1940s, there were 4,000 employees.

J. & P. Coats moved their base of operations to Delaware in 1951 and officially closed the plant in Pawtucket in November of 1964. The plant was then subdivided into a number of smaller industrial facilities, which remained through the 1980s.

== Labor strikes ==
In the early twentieth century, the complex was the site of several labor strikes.

In 1902, 800 workers went on strike over an increase in the pace of work and a reduction in their wages linked with the implementation by the 58-hour work week in Rhode Island. Employees returned to work after one week.

In 1907, there was a strike among the 500 workers in the carding room. The board of J. & P. Coats authorized general manager Alfred M. Coats to meet the strikers’ demands, which included a ten percent wage increase. While not unionized, the "carding room employees" who lead the strike received guidance from John Golden, President of the United Textile Workers of America.

In January of 1910, there was another mass strike among the plant’s 2,500 employees. Strikers demanded that their wages not be decreased with the reduction of the work week to 56 hours and demanded a ten percent increase. Alfred M. Coats refused to negotiate until work resumed and, after a failed attempt at restarting production, moved to close the entire plant for an indefinite period of time. He resigned his position as general manager a few days later. The strike, which did not encompass all the employees, had an adverse effect on the entire economy of Pawtucket: the Providence Journal estimated that the payroll of the plant was about $25,000 a week, most of which was spent at local Pawtucket stores, and as a result, roughly 10,000 people were impacted by the mill’s closing. A number of girls and women, who worked as carders and twisters at the plant, also joined in the strike, which lasted over a month with the company directorate refusing to grant any demands.

== See also ==
- Alfred M. Coats, general manager (1902–1910)
- 1922 New England Textile Strike
- National Register of Historic Places listings in Pawtucket, Rhode Island
- National Register of Historic Places listings in Providence County, Rhode Island
