= James Greig (British politician) =

British politician

James William Greig

Colonel Sir James William Greig CB VD KC (31 January 1859 – 10 June 1934) was a British barrister and Liberal Party politician. He sat in the House of Commons from 1910 to 1922.

== Early life ==
Greig was the son of John Borthwick Greig from Abingdon Street, Westminster, and his wife Mary, daughter of William Grant from Madeira. He was educated at University College School and at University College London, where he graduated with a BA and LL.B. He also studied in Paris at the Sorbonne and at the Collège de France.

== Career ==
Greig was called to the bar at Lincoln's Inn in 1882, and practised at the Parliamentary Bar and in Chancery Bar. He became a King's Counsel (KC) in 1913 and a bencher in 1917. He became standing arbitrator under the Railways Act 1921.

He was elected at the January 1910 general election as the Member of Parliament (MP) for Western Renfrewshire. He was re-elected in December 1910, and in 1917 he became Parliamentary Private Secretary (PPS) to the Secretary for Scotland, Robert Munro. He was made a Companion of the Order of the Bath (CB) in 1918.

At the 1918 general election he was re-elected in Western Renfrewshire as a Coalition Liberal, i.e. a supporter of David Lloyd George's coalition government. He was knighted in June 1921, but he was defeated when he stood as a National Liberal at the 1922 general election. He contested Berwick and Haddington at the 1929 general election, but came third with 26% of the votes.

Greig also served in the Volunteer Force, and by 1908 he was a Lieutenant-Colonel and Honorary Colonel of the 7th Middlesex (London Scottish) Volunteer Rifle Corps. When the Territorial and Reserve Forces Act 1907 merged the Volunteers with the remaining units of militia and Yeomanry, he became Lieutenant-Colonel and Honorary Colonel commanding the 14th Battalion of the County of London (London Scottish) Regiment of the new Territorial Force. He was awarded the Volunteer Decoration.

== Family ==
Greig married Jeannie Taylor, daughter of Captain Edward Brown from Salem, Massachusetts. She died in 1931.

Greig died suddenly on 10 June 1934, at his home in Hyde Park Gate, London. He was cremated at Golders Green Crematorium, and his ashes were interred at West Hampstead Cemetery. A memorial service was held at St Columba's Church in Pont Street.

His estate was valued at £27,921 (gross).

Parliament of the United Kingdom
Preceded by Sir Thomas Glen-Coats, Bt	Member of Parliament for Western Renfrewshire; January 1910 – 1922	Succeeded by Robert Murray
