= Prym =

German international group of companies

William Prym
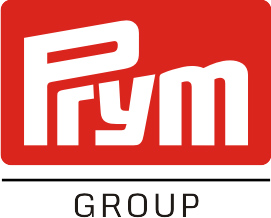
- Company type: GmbH
- Industry: Metalworking Industry, Production
- Founded: 1530; 496 years ago
- Headquarters: Zweifaller Straße 130; Stolberg; Germany
- Area served: Worldwide
- Key people: Stefan Hansen (CEO); Gian Mario Deligios (CFO); Adam Still (CHRO)
- Products: haberdashery, textile closing systems, material and surface technology, high technology mechatronics
- Revenue: €396 million (2021)
- Number of employees: 3421 (2021)
- Website: www.prym-group.com

Prym is an internationally active group of companies. It consists of four independent divisions that operate under the umbrella of a holding company: Prym Consumer, Prym Fashion, Prym Intimates and Inovan. The roots of the company go back to the 16th century. It is one of the oldest operating companies in the World. In 1642, the company moved from Aachen, Germany, to Stolberg (Rhineland), Germany. The headquarters have been located there ever since.

== History ==
The oldest known ancestor is Johann Prym (c.1340-c.1420), whose name is documented in a medieval register in Aachen. In the middle of the 16th century, Wilhelm Prym, a goldsmith, is mentioned as an administrator of an Aachen citizen. He is considered the founder of the family tradition in metal manufacturing and trade.

At the beginning of the 17th century, Protestants' loss of guild rights in catholic Aachen which caused brass manufacturer Christian Prym (1614–83) and his family to move to nearby Stolberg. In 1642 he settled down at Dollartshammer, the head office of the family company which remains at the same location.

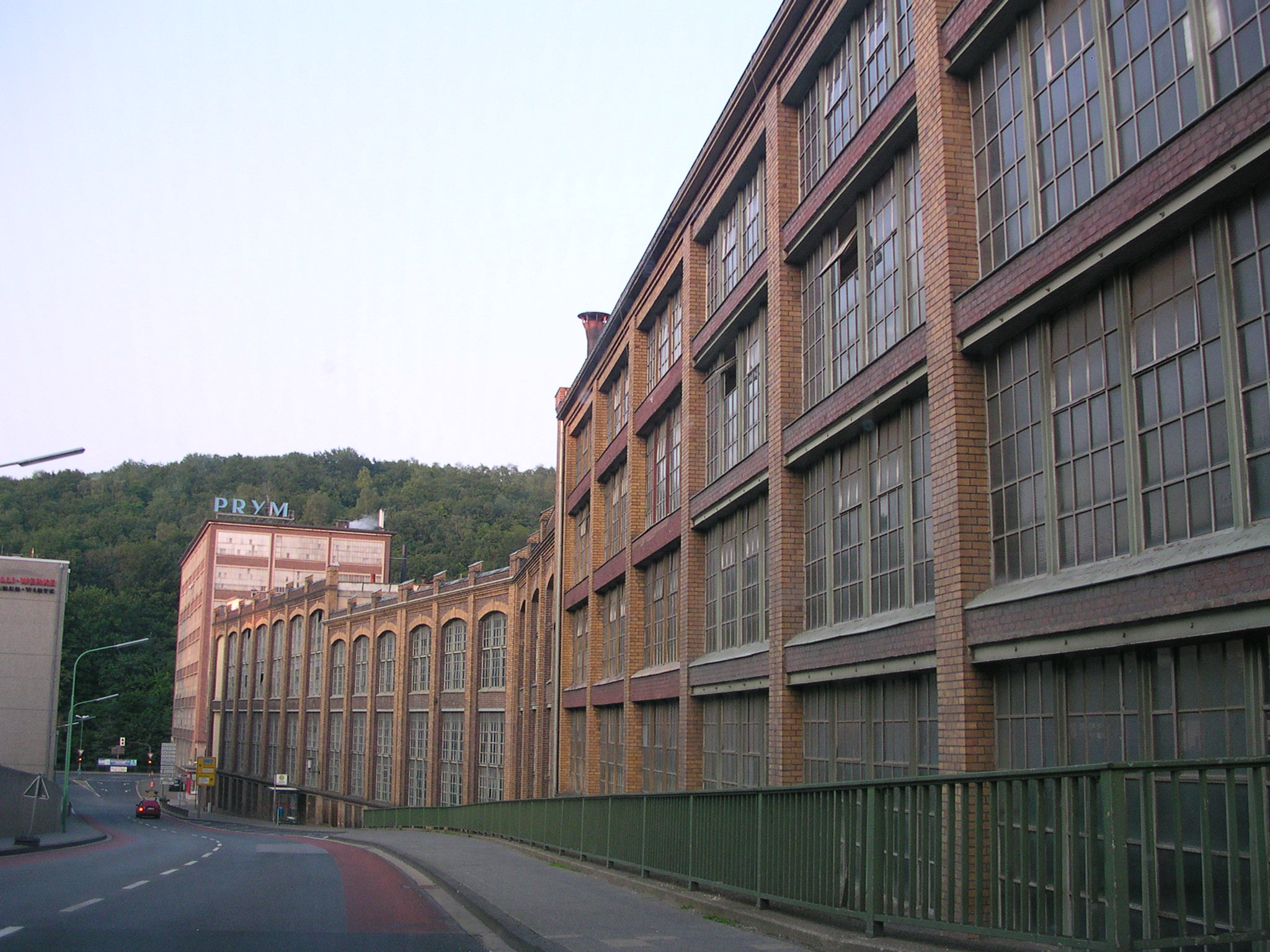
Prym Stolberg/Germany

In the 19th century, the Pryms produced the first finished products made not only of brass, but also of steel and iron in addition to the rolled material and wires made of the traditional copper alloys. Under the management of William Prym (1811–83), the company entered a new era of success. His son Heinrich August (1843–1927) did his apprenticeship in Birmingham and used the knowledge acquired there to introduce mechanical manufacturing of metal haberdashery in Germany.

Hans Friedrich (1875–1965), son of Heinrich August, expanded the Austrian production and sales branches he had been leading since 1908, to a dominating position in the Austrian monarchy and the crown lands. In 1903, he improved to the press fastener, already invented in 1885, by inventing a double S-spring. The press fastener was later marketed under the brand names "Prym" and "Prym’s Zukunft".

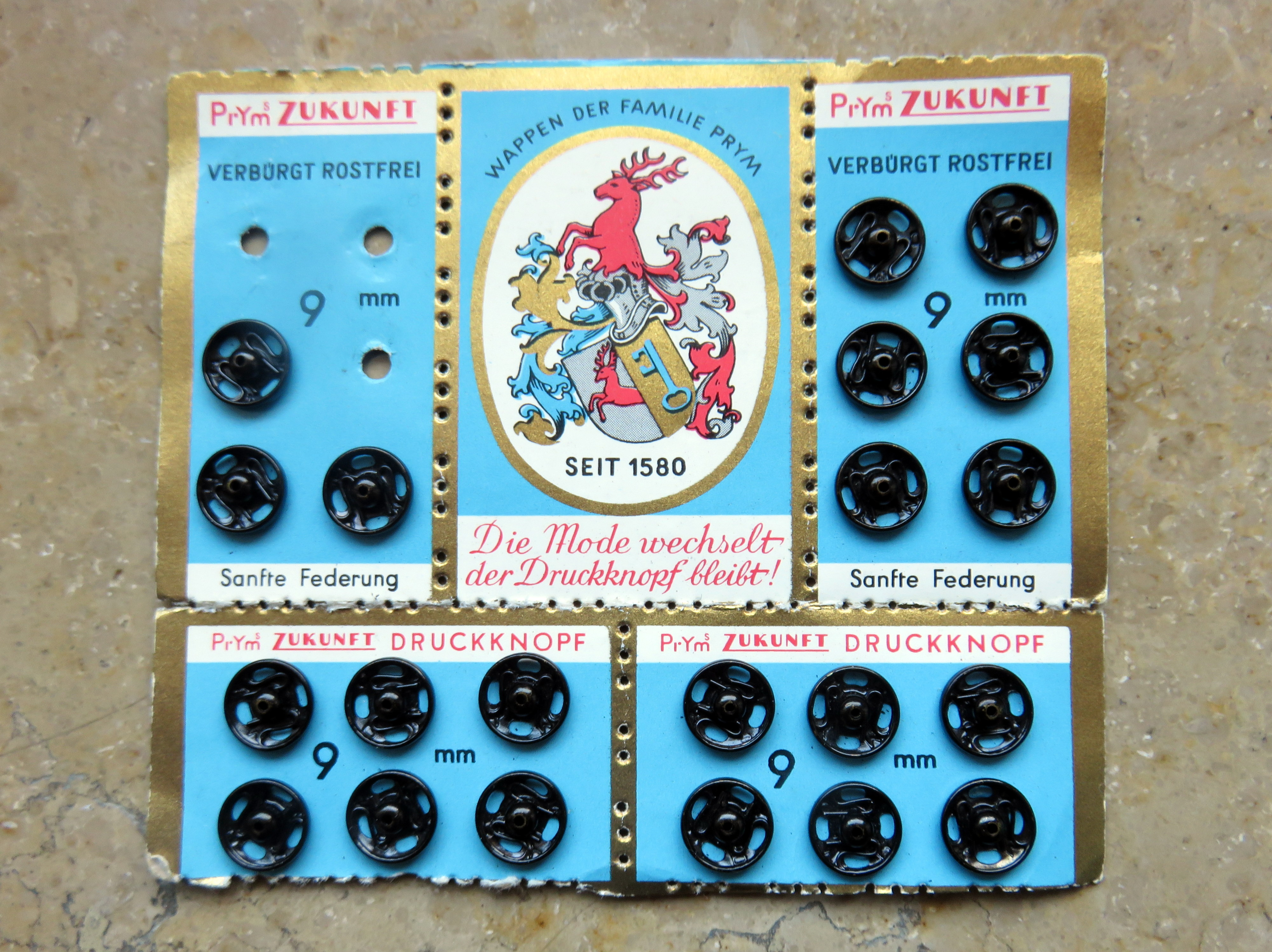
Prym snap fasteners

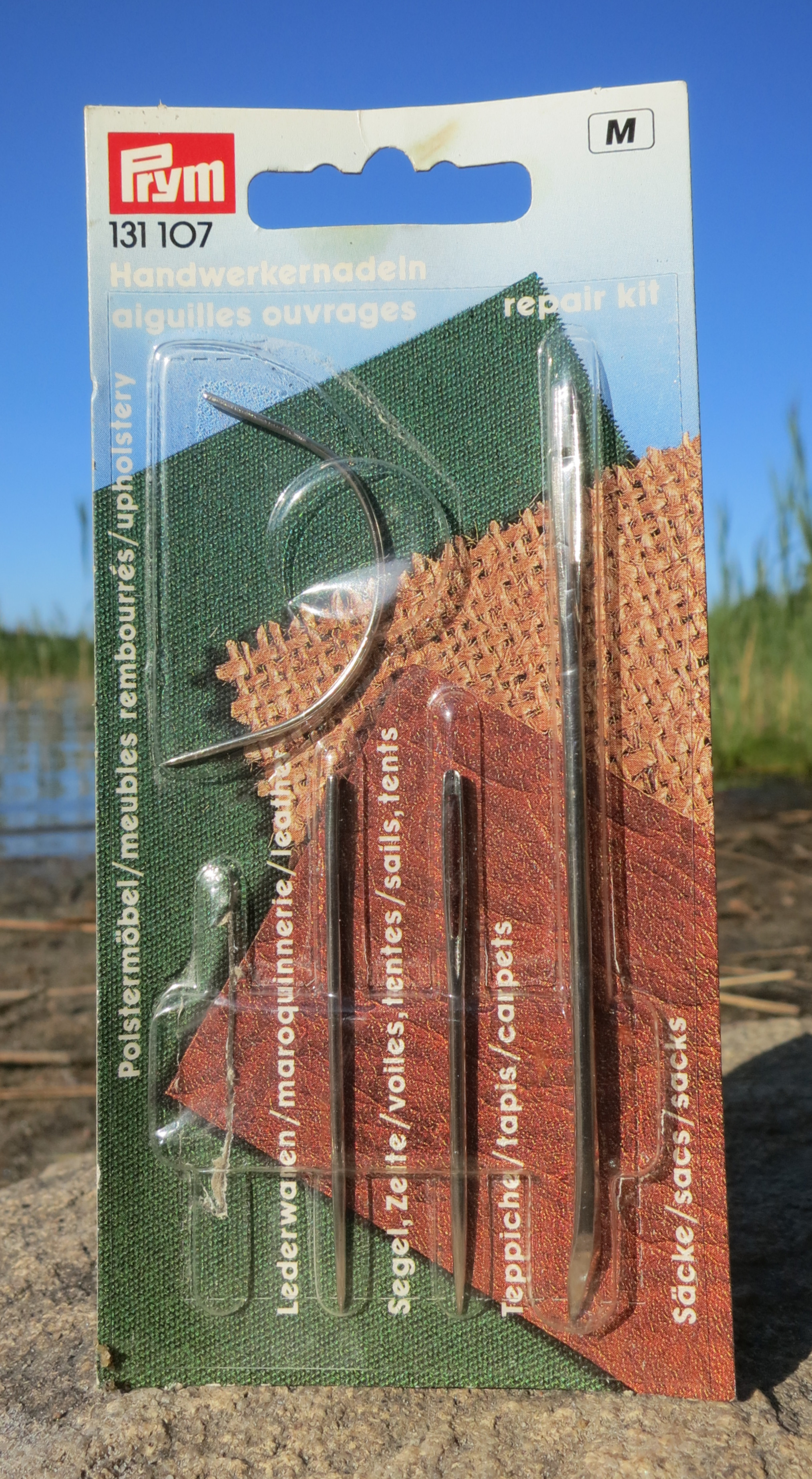
Prym sewing needles

Following World War II, the considerable possessions of the family and the company in Berlin, Eastern Germany, Poland and Belgium were lost. In 1960, after prolonged negotiations, Hans Prym was successful in buying back all Austrian properties and rights. He and his wife Olga (1884–1975) had six sons.

In 1986 Prym became a shareholder of Inovan, and, in 1994, the shares were increased to 100 percent.

In 1988, Prym acquired Schaeffer-Scovill, a German manufacturer of snap fasteners, closures and other garment accessories, and the American company Dritz, a manufacturer of sewing accessories.

In 1992, Prym acquired the Italian button manufacturer Fiocchi.

In 2001, the company segment “Prymetall” (a manufacturer of semi-finished products of copper and copper alloys) was sold to Norddeutsche Affinerie (today: Aurubis).

In 2007, Prym was fined €40M by the European Commission for its part in operating a price fixing cartel, along with YKK and Coats plc. Prym's fine was much less than the other companies' as it alerted the Commission about the wrongdoing. Today, the company is structured into four independent divisions: Prym Consumer, Prym Fashion, Inovan and Prym Intimates. The company is still majority-owned by the Prym family.

== See also ==
- List of oldest companies

== Sources ==
- Updated version of the New German Biography, Hist. Commission of the Bavarian Academy of Science, volume 20, P5997a, Andrea Prym-Bruck
- William Prym company archives
- Justus Hashagen: Geschichte der Familie Hoesch. 6 vol., Cologne: Neubner, 1911-1916
- F. Willems, P., History and Genealogy, 1968;
- Lothar Mathar; Augustus Voigt: Über die Entstehung der Metallindustrie im Bereich der Erzvorkommen zwischen Dinant und Stolberg. Lammersdorf üb. Aachen: Junker, 1969
- C. Bruckner, On the economic history of the regional district of Aachen, 1967, pp. 274–84;
- L. H. Meyer, Copper and brass industry, in: With water and steam, published by G. Fehl, and others, 1991, p. 178 ff.;
- History of copper and brass processing in the Aachen and Stolberg area, in: Zinkhütter Hof, museum guide, series of publications of the museum), 1996, pp. 14–24. – source: city archives of Aachen.
