= Andrews House (Brown University) =

Historic building in Providence, Rhode Island

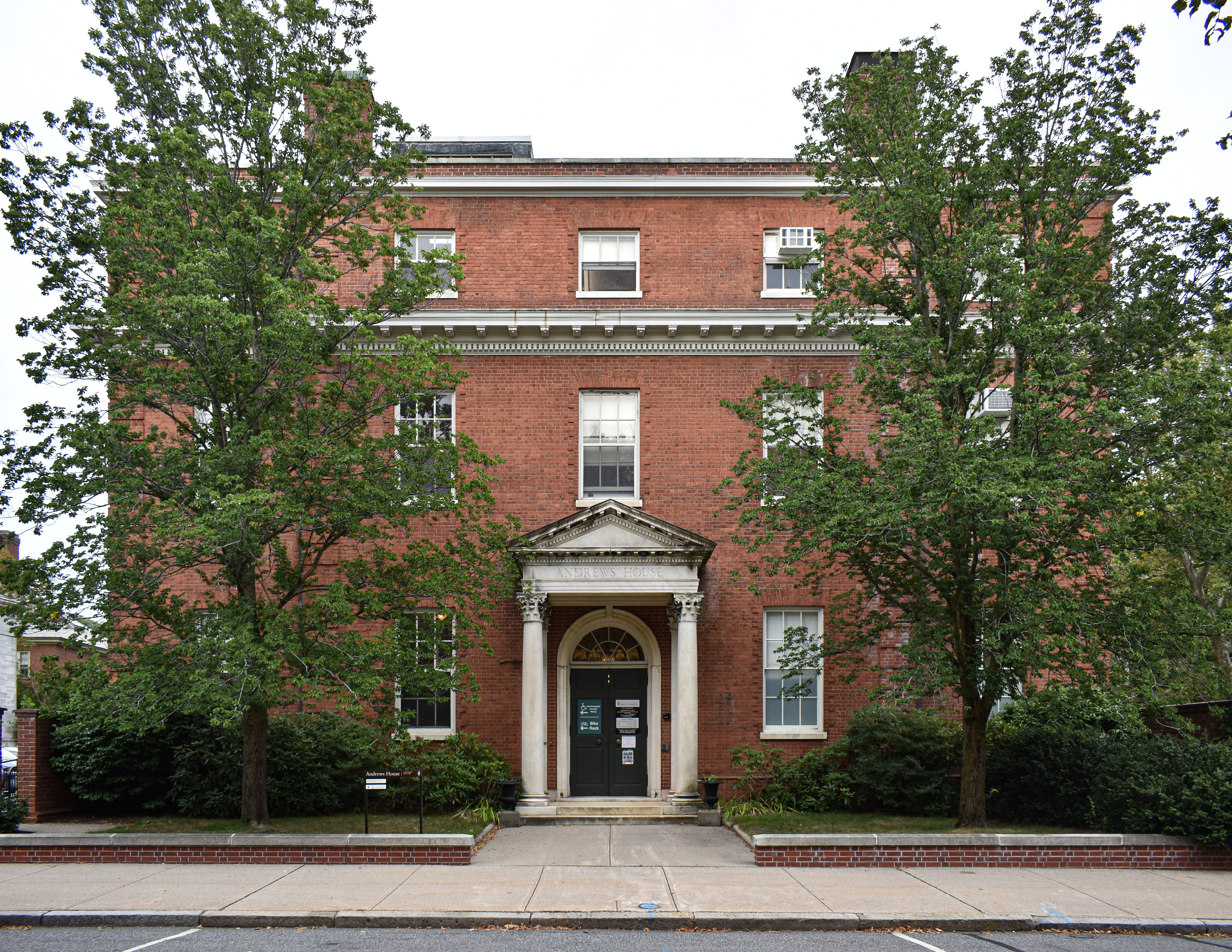
Front view (Brown Street side), September 2020

Andrews House is a historic building at 13 Brown Street on the campus of Brown University in Providence, Rhode Island. It is currently home to the Cogut Institute for the Humanities at Brown University. The building was named after the eighth president of the university E. Benjamin Andrews in 1939.

== Winter Home ==
The building was designed by architect Ogden Codman Jr. in 1900–1901 to serve as a winter home for the Scottish-American industrialist Alfred M. Coats.

The residence combined two parcels to form one property in excess of 23,500 square feet. "The estates purchased," The Providence Daily Journal reported, "include the Mason house at 17 Brown street and the Deacon Read estate on the corner of Charles Field and Brown Streets." "The latter house," the journal noted, "has stood for years as a landmark in the section of the city. It is an old-fashioned brick homestead, standing right on the street line and is at present occupied by the heirs of Deacon Read, at one time so well known in the woolen trade." The Providence Daily Journal estimated the cost of the project at $125,000.

The Providence Daily Journal compared the house, "built in the old Colonial style, and finished in the interior in pure marble and white decorations," with "one of the old mansions along the east shore of Maryland in its surroundings, and is richly furnished. [...] large, double doors, opening from a side hall alcove to a porch of white marble, overlook[ed] the yard. On the Brown street side and in the rear as well, the yard is enclosed by a brick wall, with a gate in the rear wall, opening on the stable yard."

== R.I. Governor Mansion (1915–1921) ==
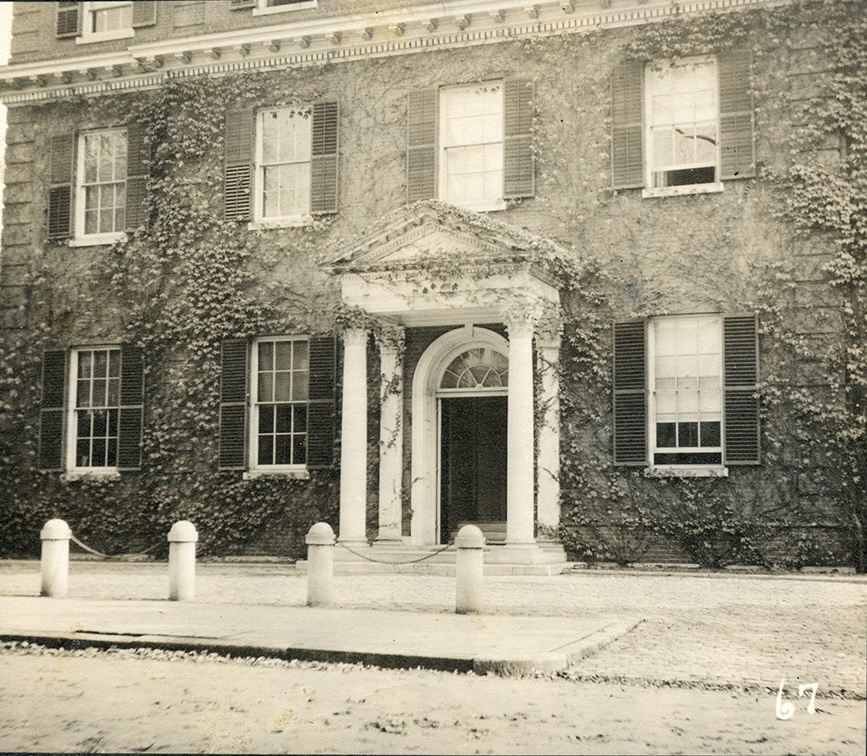
Front view (Brown Street side), c.1910–c.1920

R. Livinsgton Beeckman moved to 13 Brown Street in 1913 and used the building while in office from 1915 to 1921. The "executive residence" was the site of an annual reception for members of the [R.I.] Legislature as well as an annual dinner for members of the press.

During that time, the building housed Beeckman's personal collection of four French and Flemish tapestries and four embroidered armorial tapestries from the 16th and 18th centuries, which were briefly exhibited at the Rhode Island School of Design after Beeckman's move.

In a first-person recollection of the 1919 dinner for the press, journalist David Patten (who started his career as a reporter in 1918 and went on to become the managing editor of the Providence Journal and Evening Bulletin) recalled an extensive serving staff, music from a hidden string orchestra, and "RLB" engraved silverware.

== Faculty Club (1922–1938) ==
Brown University acquired the building in 1922 to house faculty and graduate students and converted the first floor into its faculty club. The new facility opened in March 1923 on Visiting Day in the presence of "more than 200 alumni, many members of the corporation and board of trustees, and practically all the faculty."

The ballroom was kept "for the holding of meetings and for social purposes," with white and gold walls and panels of light blue and cream-colored velvet velour. Other features included, on the first floor, a lounge, a library and a dining room, the latter two rooms "exquisitely finished in brown oak"; in the basement, "a commodious room where billiards will afford relaxation"; and a new steam heating system to serve the apartments of "bachelor members" of the faculty and graduate student body.

== Brown University Infirmary and Health Services (1939–2021) ==
A $300,000 gift by Charles Henry Hare (Class of 1885) made the conversion of the building into Brown's infirmary possible together its naming for E. Benjamin Andrews, president of Brown University from 1889 to 1898. The new infirmary included X-ray machinery and a developing room in the basement; a waiting room, a medical office, a surgical office on the first floor; a dental office on the second floor; and rooms for in-patients.

Brown University Health Services moved to a new location on Brook Street in 2021. The building served as a temporary home for the Department of Africana Studies in 2022–23. Brown University announced in 2022 the renovation of Andrews House to become the home of the Cogut Institute for Humanities.
