= Coats baronets =

Baronetcy in the Baronetage of the United Kingdom

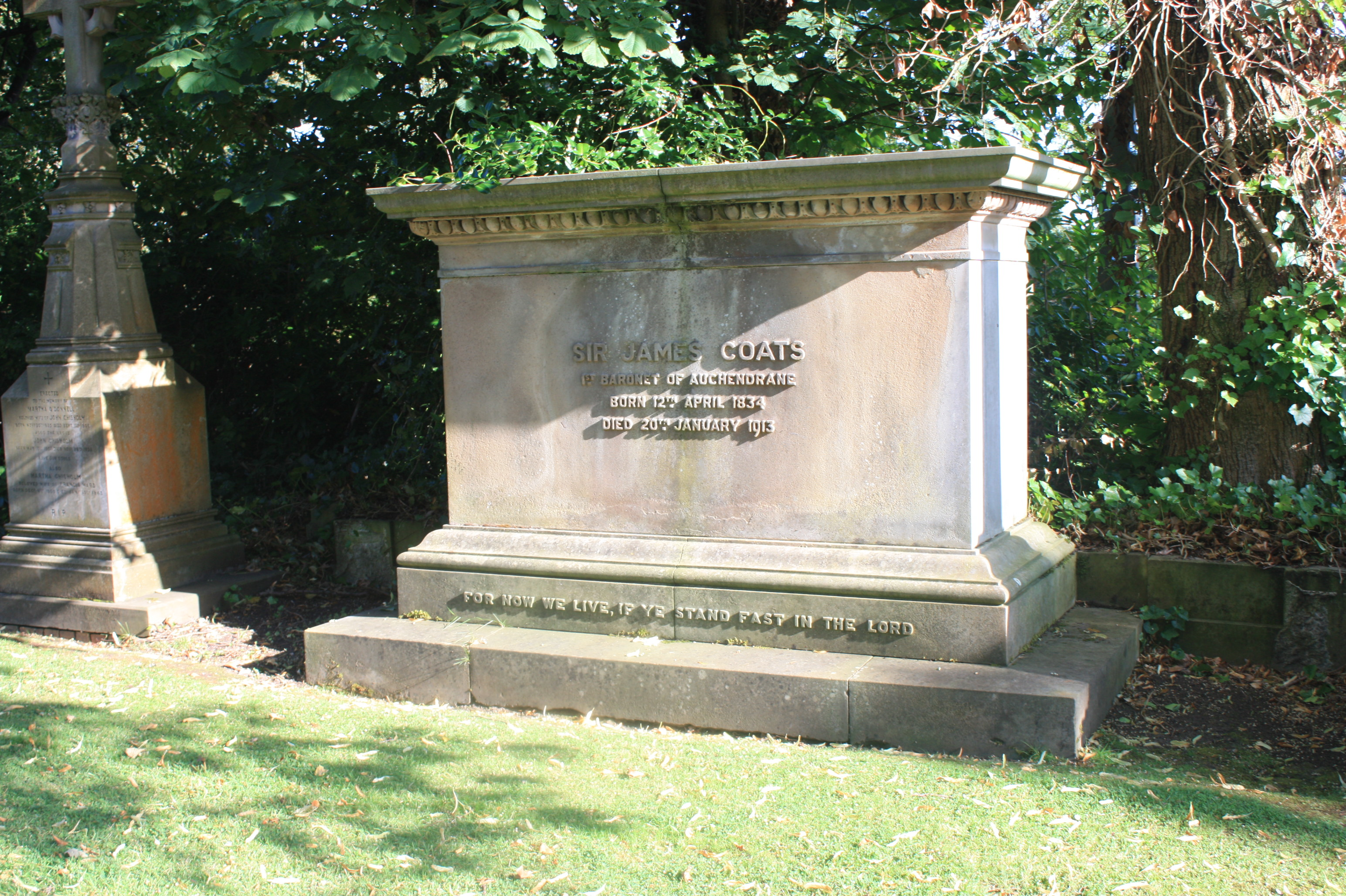
Sir James Coats grave, Woodside Cemetery, Paisley

The Coats baronetcy, of Auchendrane in the parish of Maybole in the County of Ayr, is a title in the Baronetage of the United Kingdom. It was created on 7 December 1905 for James Coats, Director of J. and P. Coats Ltd, sewing cotton manufacturers. The 2nd Baronet represented Wimbledon and East Surrey in the House of Commons as a Conservative.

The 1st Baronet was a first cousin of Sir Thomas Glen-Coats, 1st Baronet, and his brother George Coats, 1st Baron Glentanar.

== Coats baronets, of Auchendrane (1905) ==
- Sir James Coats, 1st Baronet (1834–1913)
- Sir Stuart Auchincloss Coats, 2nd Baronet (1868–1959)
- Sir James Stuart Coats, 3rd Baronet (1894–1966)
- Sir Alastair Francis Stuart Coats, 4th Baronet (1921–2015)
- Sir Alexander James Coats, 5th Baronet (born 1951)

The heir presumptive is Dominic Peter Coats (born 1962), cousin of the 5th Baronet.

Coat of arms of Coats of Auchendrane (1869-1913)
Notes Arms granted in 1869. Crest Upon a wreath of his liveries, an anchor erect Proper. Escutcheon Or, a stag's head erased Gules, between the attires a pheon Azure, all between three mascles Sable. Motto Be firm

Coat of arms of Coats of Auchendrane (1913 onwards)
Notes Arms granted in 1913. Coronet Coeur fidel (Faithful heart) Crest On a wreath of the colours, a stag's head erased Proper, charged on the neck with an escarbuncle Or. Escutcheon Or, three mascles sable, a chief engrailed azure, semé of fleurs-de-lys of the field

== See also ==
- Glen-Coats baronets
- Baron Glentanar

Baronetage of the United Kingdom
Preceded by Avery baronets	Coats baronets of Auchendrane; 7 December 1905	Succeeded by Davis-Goff baronets
