= West Renfrewshire (UK Parliament constituency) =

UK Parliament constituency (1997–2005)

- Former county constituency for the House of Commons
- Boundary of West Renfrewshire in Scotland for the 2001 general election
- Subdivision: Renfrewshire

1997–2005
- Seats: One
- Replaced by: Inverclyde; Paisley and Renfrewshire North; Paisley and Renfrewshire South

1885–1983
- Seats: One
- Created from: Renfrewshire
- Replaced by: Renfrew West & Inverclyde; Paisley North; Paisley South

West Renfrewshire was a county constituency of the House of Commons of the Parliament of the United Kingdom from 1885 to 1983 and again from 1997 until 2005. In 2005 the constituency was abolished and the area is now represented by Inverclyde, Paisley and Renfrewshire North and Paisley and Renfrewshire South.

== Boundaries ==
The Redistribution of Seats Act 1885 provided that the Western division should consist of "the parishes of Inverkip, Greenock, Port Glasgow, Kilmacolm, Erskine, Inchinnan, Houston, Kilbarchan, Lochwinnoch, Renfrew, Abbey, Neilston, Beith, and Dunlop".

From 1918 the constituency consisted of "The Lower county District, inclusive of all burghs situated therein, except the burgh of Greenock, together with the burgh of Johnstone."

From 1997 to 2005 the constituency consisted of the Renfrew District electoral divisions of Bargarran and Gryffe, and the Inverclyde District electoral division of Port Glasgow and Kilmacolm.

In 1999 with the creation of the devolved Scottish Parliament, a Scottish Parliamentary constituency of West Renfrewshire was created with the same name and boundaries as the UK Parliament constituency.

=== Abolition ===
Under the Parliamentary Constituencies (Scotland) Order 1983 (SI 1983/422), made under the authority of the House of Commons (Redistribution of Seats) Act 1949, West Renfrewshire was abolished in 1983. The area of the constituency was divided between Renfrew West and Inverclyde, Paisley North and Paisley South.

In 2005, the constituency was again abolished and remains so to the present day. The Parliamentary Constituencies (Scotland) Order 2005 (SI 2005/250) made under the authority of the Parliamentary Constituencies Act 1986 divided the former West Renfrewshire constituency amongst the new Inverclyde, Paisley and Renfrewshire North and Paisley and Renfrewshire South constituencies.

== Members of Parliament ==
=== MPs 1885–1983 ===
Election	Member	Party
1885	Sir Archibald Campbell, Bt	Unionist
1892	Charles Renshaw	Unionist
1906	Sir Thomas Glen-Coats, Bt	Liberal
January 1910	James Greig	Liberal
1916	James Greig	Coalition Liberal
Jan 1922	James Greig	National Liberal
Nov 1922	Robert Murray	Labour
1924	McInnes Shaw	Unionist
1929	Robert Forgan	Labour
1931	Henry Scrymgeour-Wedderburn, later Earl of Dundee	Unionist
1945	Thomas Scollan	Labour
1950	John Maclay later Viscount Muirshiel	National Liberal and Conservative
1964	Norman Buchan	Labour
1983	constituency abolished	

Constituency divided amongst:

- Renfrew West and Inverclyde
- Paisley North
- Paisley South

=== MPs 1997–2005 ===
Election	Member	Party
1997	Tommy Graham	Labour
1998	Tommy Graham	Independent
2001	Jim Sheridan	Labour
2005	constituency abolished	

Constituency divided amongst:

- Inverclyde
- Paisley and Renfrewshire North
- Paisley and Renfrewshire South

== Election results ==
=== Elections in the 1880s ===
General election 1885: West Renfrewshire
Party	Candidate	Votes	%
Conservative	Archibald Campbell	3,618	54.8
Liberal	Harry Smith	2,980	45.2
Majority		638	9.6
Turnout		6,598	85.1
Registered electors		7,750	
Conservative win (new seat)			

General election 1886: West Renfrewshire
Party	Candidate	Votes	%	±%
Conservative	Archibald Campbell	3,434	54.4	−0.4
Liberal	William Dunn	2,881	45.6	+0.4
Majority		553	8.8	−0.8
Turnout		6,315	81.5	−3.6
Registered electors		7,750		
Conservative hold		Swing	−0.4	

=== Elections in the 1890s ===
Wallace

General election 1892: West Renfrewshire
Party	Candidate	Votes	%	±%
Conservative	Charles Renshaw	3,773	53.2	−1.2
Liberal	Robert Wallace	3,322	46.8	+1.2
Majority		451	6.4	−2.4
Turnout		7,095	86.6	+5.1
Registered electors		8,192		
Conservative hold		Swing	−1.2	

General election 1895: West Renfrewshire
Party	Candidate	Votes	%	±%
Conservative	Charles Renshaw	3,909	54.2	+1.0
Liberal	Duncan Pirie	3,306	45.8	−1.0
Majority		603	8.4	+2.0
Turnout		7,215	86.0	−0.6
Registered electors		8,386		
Conservative hold		Swing	+1.0	

=== Elections in the 1900s ===
General election 1900: West Renfrewshire
Party	Candidate	Votes	%	±%
Conservative	Charles Renshaw	4,323	51.6	−2.6
Liberal	Thomas Glen-Coats	4,053	48.4	+2.6
Majority		270	3.2	−5.2
Turnout		8,376	84.9	−1.1
Registered electors		9,861		
Conservative hold		Swing	−2.6	

General election 1906: West Renfrewshire 12,079
Party	Candidate	Votes	%	±%
Liberal	Thomas Glen-Coats	5,858	56.6	+8.2
Conservative	John Charles Cunninghame	4,490	43.4	−8.2
Majority		1,368	13.2	N/A
Turnout		10,348	85.7	+0.8
Registered electors		12,079		
Liberal gain from Conservative		Swing	+8.2	

=== Elections in the 1910s ===
General election January 1910: West Renfrewshire
Party	Candidate	Votes	%	±%
Liberal	James Greig	6,480	53.5	−3.1
Conservative	John Charles Cuninghame	5,631	46.5	+3.1
Majority		849	7.0	−6.2
Turnout		12,111	87.1	+1.4
Registered electors		13,900		
Liberal hold		Swing	−3.1	

General election December 1910: West Renfrewshire
Party	Candidate	Votes	%	±%
Liberal	James Greig	6,366	51.1	−2.4
Conservative	Henry Mechan	6,082	48.9	+2.4
Majority		284	2.2	−4.8
Turnout		12,448	86.7	−0.4
Registered electors		14,363		
Liberal hold		Swing	−2.4	

General Election 1914–15:

Another General Election was required to take place before the end of 1915. The political parties had been making preparations for an election to take place and by July 1914, the following candidates had been selected;

- Liberal: James Greig
- Unionist: Henry Mechan

James Greig

General election 1918: West Renfrewshire
Party		Candidate	Votes	%	±%
C	National Liberal	James Greig	11,524	61.8	+10.7
	Labour	Robert Murray	7,126	38.2	New
Majority			4,398	23.6	+21.4
Turnout			18,650	65.3	−21.4
Registered electors			28,542		
	National Liberal hold		Swing		
C indicates candidate endorsed by the coalition government.

=== Elections in the 1920s ===
General election 1922: West Renfrewshire
Party	Candidate	Votes	%	±%
Labour	Robert Murray	11,787	54.0	+15.8
National Liberal	James Greig	10,051	46.0	−15.8
Majority		1,736	8.0	N/A
Turnout		21,838	75.6	+10.3
Registered electors		28,868		
Labour gain from National Liberal		Swing	+15.8	

General election 1923: West Renfrewshire
Party	Candidate	Votes	%	±%
Labour	Robert Murray	10,904	48.1	−5.9
Unionist	Alexander Thomson Taylor	7,602	33.6	New
Liberal	James Scott	4,149	18.3	−27.7
Majority		3,302	14.5	+6.5
Turnout		22,655	77.0	+1.4
Registered electors		29,426		
Labour hold		Swing	+10.9	

General election 1924: West Renfrewshire
Party	Candidate	Votes	%	±%
Unionist	McInnes Shaw	13,267	54.1	+20.5
Labour	Robert Murray	11,252	45.9	−2.2
Majority		2,015	8.2	N/A
Turnout		24,519	84.5	+7.5
Registered electors		29,029		
Unionist gain from Labour		Swing	+9.2	

General election 1929: West Renfrewshire
Party	Candidate	Votes	%	±%
Labour	Robert Forgan	14,419	46.5	+0.6
Unionist	Alexander Thomson Taylor	12,183	39.4	−14.7
Liberal	Francis Anderson	2,682	8.7	New
National (Scotland)	Roland Muirhead	1,667	5.4	New
Majority		2,236	7.1	N/A
Turnout		30,951	81.6	−2.9
Registered electors		37,947		
Labour gain from Unionist		Swing	+7.7	

=== Elections in the 1930s ===
General election 1931: West Renfrewshire
Party	Candidate	Votes	%	±%
Unionist	Henry Scrymgeour-Wedderburn	17,318	53.5	+14.1
Ind. Labour Party	Jean Mann	10,203	31.5	N/A
National (Scotland)	Roland Muirhead	3,547	11.0	+5.6
New Party	Robert Forgan	1,304	4.0	New
Majority		7,115	22.0	+14.9
Turnout		32,372	83.2	+1.6
Unionist gain from Labour		Swing		

General election 1935: West Renfrewshire
Party	Candidate	Votes	%	±%
Unionist	Henry Scrymgeour-Wedderburn	15,906	49.7	−3.8
Labour	Jean Mann	12,407	38.8	+7.3
SNP	Roland Muirhead	3,697	11.5	+0.5
Majority		3,499	10.9	−11.1
Turnout		32,010	81.2	−2.0
Unionist hold		Swing		

=== Elections in the 1940s ===
General Election 1939–40

Another General Election was required to take place before the end of 1940. The political parties had been making preparations for an election to take place and by the Autumn of 1939, the following candidates had been selected;

- Unionist: Henry Scrymgeour-Wedderburn
- Labour: David Cleghorn Thomson
- SNP:

General election 1945: West Renfrewshire
Party	Candidate	Votes	%	±%
Labour	Thomas Scollan	15,050	48.9	+10.1
Unionist	Henry Scrymgeour-Wedderburn	13,836	44.9	−4.8
SNP	Robert Blair Wilkie	1,955	6.3	−5.2
Majority		1,214	4.0	N/A
Turnout		30,841	70.0	−11.2
Labour gain from Unionist		Swing	+7.4	

=== Elections in the 1950s ===
General election 1950: West Renfrewshire
Party	Candidate	Votes	%	±%
National Liberal	John Maclay	20,810	54.03	
Labour	Thomas Scollan	17,708	45.97	
Majority		3,102	8.06	N/A
Turnout		38,518	77.42	
National Liberal gain from Labour		Swing		

General election 1951: West Renfrewshire
Party	Candidate	Votes	%	±%
National Liberal	John Maclay	21,456	53.71	
Labour	Bruce Millan	18,493	46.29	
Majority		2,963	7.42	
Turnout		39,949	84.66	
National Liberal hold		Swing		

General election 1955: West Renfrewshire
Party	Candidate	Votes	%	±%
National Liberal	John Maclay	21,283	55.24	
Labour Co-op	Dickson Mabon	17,243	44.76	
Majority		4,040	10.48	
Turnout		38,526	83.02	
National Liberal hold		Swing		

General election 1959: West Renfrewshire
Party	Candidate	Votes	%	±%
National Liberal	John Maclay	20,959	53.51	
Labour	Charles Minihan	18,206	46.49	
Majority		2,753	7.02	
Turnout		39,165	82.64	
National Liberal hold		Swing		

=== Elections in the 1960s ===
General election 1964: West Renfrewshire
Party	Candidate	Votes	%	±%
Labour	Norman Buchan	19,518	46.17	
Unionist	Roy Pickering Paton	18,507	43.77	
Liberal	Gavin E McFadyean	4,253	10.06	N/A
Majority		1,011	2.40	N/A
Turnout		42,278	82.87	
Labour gain from National Liberal		Swing		

General election 1966: West Renfrewshire
Party	Candidate	Votes	%	±%
Labour	Norman Buchan	23,849	54.31	
Conservative	Roy Pickering Paton	20,060	45.69	
Majority		3,789	8.62	
Turnout		43,909	81.62	
Labour hold		Swing		

=== Elections in the 1970s ===
General election 1970: West Renfrewshire
Party	Candidate	Votes	%	±%
Labour	Norman Buchan	22,999	48.02	
Conservative	Alexander Fletcher	20,699	43.22	
SNP	Allan Macartney	4,195	8.76	New
Majority		2,300	4.80	
Turnout		47,893	79.41	
Labour hold		Swing		

General election February 1974: West Renfrewshire
Party	Candidate	Votes	%	±%
Labour	Norman Buchan	22,178	40.25	
Conservative	J. Ross-Harper	19,510	35.41	
SNP	Charles Cameron	8,394	15.23	
Liberal	David Young	5,022	9.11	New
Majority		2,668	4.84	
Turnout		55,104	82.92	
Labour hold		Swing		

General election October 1974: West Renfrewshire
Party	Candidate	Votes	%	±%
Labour	Norman Buchan	20,674	38.49	
SNP	Charles Cameron	15,374	28.62	
Conservative	J. Ross-Harper	14,399	26.80	
Liberal	D Brown	3,271	6.09	
Majority		5,300	9.87	
Turnout		53,718	80.08	
Labour hold		Swing		

General election 1979: West Renfrewshire
Party	Candidate	Votes	%	±%
Labour	Norman Buchan	28,236	44.47	+5.98
Conservative	W Boyle	19,664	30.97	+4.17
SNP	Charles Cameron	8,333	13.13	−15.49
Liberal	Ross Finnie	7,256	11.43	+5.34
Majority		8,572	13.50	+4.63
Turnout		63,489	81.17	+1.09
Labour hold		Swing		

=== Elections in the 1990s ===
General election 1997: West Renfrewshire
Party	Candidate	Votes	%	±%
Labour	Tommy Graham	19,525	46.6	+3.7
SNP	Colin Campbell	10,546	26.5	+5.9
Conservative	Charles J.S. Cormack	7,387	18.6	−9.2
Liberal Democrats	Bruce J.S. Macpherson	3,045	7.7	−0.8
Referendum	Shaw T. Lindsay	283	0.7	New
Majority		7,979	20.1	
Turnout		39,786	76.0	
Labour win (new seat)				

=== Elections in the 2000s ===
General election 2001: West Renfrewshire
Party	Candidate	Votes	%	±%
Labour	Jim Sheridan	15,720	46.9	+0.3
SNP	Carol Puthucheary	7,145	21.3	−5.2
Conservative	David Sharpe	5,522	16.5	−2.1
Liberal Democrats	Clare Hamblen	4,185	12.5	+4.8
Scottish Socialist	Arlene Nunnery	925	2.8	New
Majority		8,575	25.6	+5.5
Turnout		33,497	63.3	−12.7
Labour hold		Swing		
