= Hill Street, London =

Street in Mayfair, London, England

Coordinates: 51°30′31″N 0°8′58″W

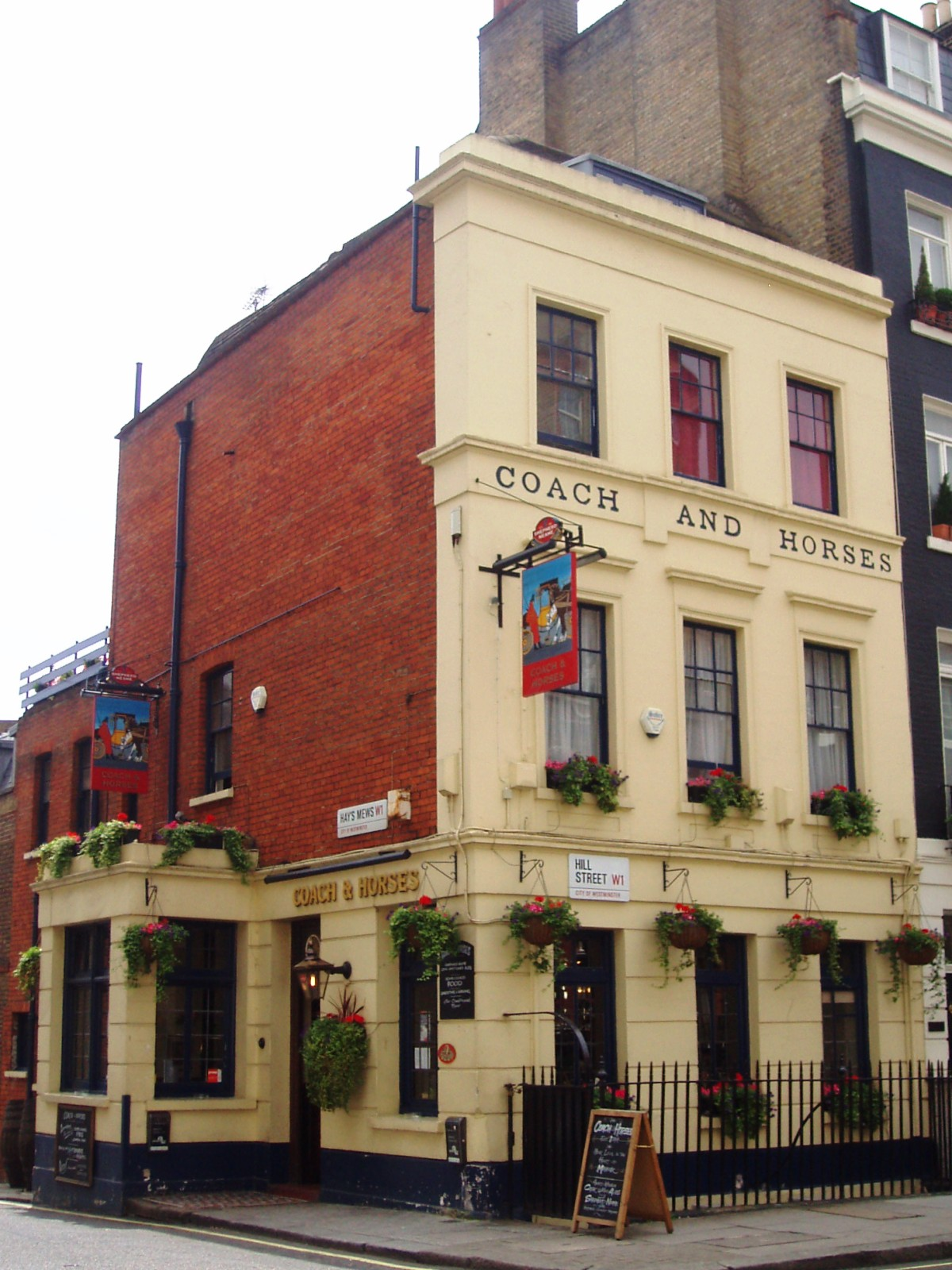
At No.5, the Coach and Horses co-fronts Hays Mews. It dates to the 1740s when the street was laid out. It was then a coaching inn and is the oldest surviving public house in Mayfair. The building is Grade II-listed.

Hill Street is a street in Mayfair, London, which runs south-west, then west, from Berkeley Square to Deanery Street, a short approach way from Park Lane. It was developed from farmland in the 18th century. Travelling one block to the east and south sees a fall of about three metres, whereas in the other direction the land rises gradually across six main blocks to beyond the north of Marble Arch (see Hyde Park). Hill Street's homes gained fashionable status from the outset: grand townhouses seeing use, at first, as seasonal lettings (rentals) and/or longer-term London homes of nobility – later, of other wealthy capitalists as much. Twenty-two, approximately half of its town houses, are listed. Along its course, only Audley Square House departs from townhouse-sized frontage, yet this shares in the street's predominant form of domestic architecture, Georgian neo-classical. Hill Street's public house is the oldest surviving one in Mayfair.

== Development and architecture ==
Hill Street marked in red on John Rocque's map of 1746

The street's development was overseen in the 1740s by local landowner Lord Berkeley, who owned the house, gardens and farm holdings now covered by Berkeley Square and streets beyond. When John Rocque produced his map of London in 1746, most streets on the west side of this square were shown in outline as building was underway; Hill Street was among the last area of farmland, and thus crosses "Farm" Street. Hill Street is like Mount Street and others to the north in dropping a little over three metres toward its east end, but here the land falls the same amount – though more rapidly – toward the next block south, scaled by Chesterfield Hill (in previous years named John Street) and Hays Mews; similarly to the east where the Tyburn ran.

Foremost architects used were Benjamin Timbrell, as to Nos 17 and 19 c.1748, and Oliver Hill, as to No.15 in the 1920s.

Claud Phillimore refurbished No.35 for Lady Astor in the late 1940s, giving six storeys and a basement for a grand and comfortable residence. Lady Astor's personal living room – "the Boudoir" – had walls decorated with blue satin. Twenty-two of the town houses are listed buildings: Nos 1 and 3, 7, 8, 9, 10, 11, 20, 22, 25, 26, 29, 31, 33, 35, 36, 38, 40, and 42 and 44 Hill Street are listed Grade II; No.19 is Grade II*; No.17 has the highest status, Grade I.

== Literary associations ==
Mrs. Montagu's Room of Cupidons

Before the palace in Portman Square was built she had lived in Hill Street, Mayfair, her rooms in which are thus depicted by the last-named writer the date being 1773, when Mrs. Montagu was fifty-seven. "If I had paper and time I could entertain you with the account of Mrs. M.'s Room of Cupidons, which was opened with an assembly for all the foreigners, the literati, and the macaronis of the present age. Many and sly are the observations. How such a genius, at her age, and so circumstanced (Mr. M. had recently taken his upward flight), could think of painting the walls of her dressing-room with bowers of roses and jessamines entirely inhabited by little cupids in all their little wanton ways, is astonishing."

— Doctor Johnson and the Fair Sex: A Study of Contrasts, W. H. Craig, 1895

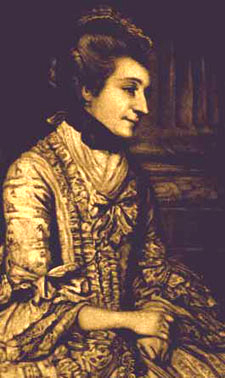
Elizabeth Montagu held literary parties in Hill Street.

Elizabeth Montagu hosted a literary salon at her house in Hill Street. Her circle was known as the Blue Stockings Society, and Samuel Johnson called her the "Queen of the Blues". Other notable attendees of her gatherings included Edmund Burke, David Garrick, Joshua Reynolds and Horace Walpole.

In Jane Austen's novel Mansfield Park, Henry and Mary Crawford's uncle is an admiral living in Hill Street. Sir Walter Scott's novel Waverley, in which the hero's father is a Whig politician who lives in Hill Street, was published at the same time.

In Thackeray's Vanity Fair, several characters live on Great Gaunt Street or the adjoining Gaunt Square, including Lord and Lady Steyne and Sir Pitt Crawley. This fictional street was modelled on Hill Street. In addition, Lady Bareacres in the novel lives on Hill Street.

Evelyn Waugh satirised Mayfair decadence in his novel Vile Bodies. In this, along Hill Street stood fictional Pastmaster House – "the William and Mary mansion of Lord and Lady Metroland with a magnificent ballroom, 'by universal consent the most beautiful building between Bond Street and Park Lane'".

The Bright Young Thing society novelist Nancy Mitford stayed at No.40 in 1955.

== Prestige ==
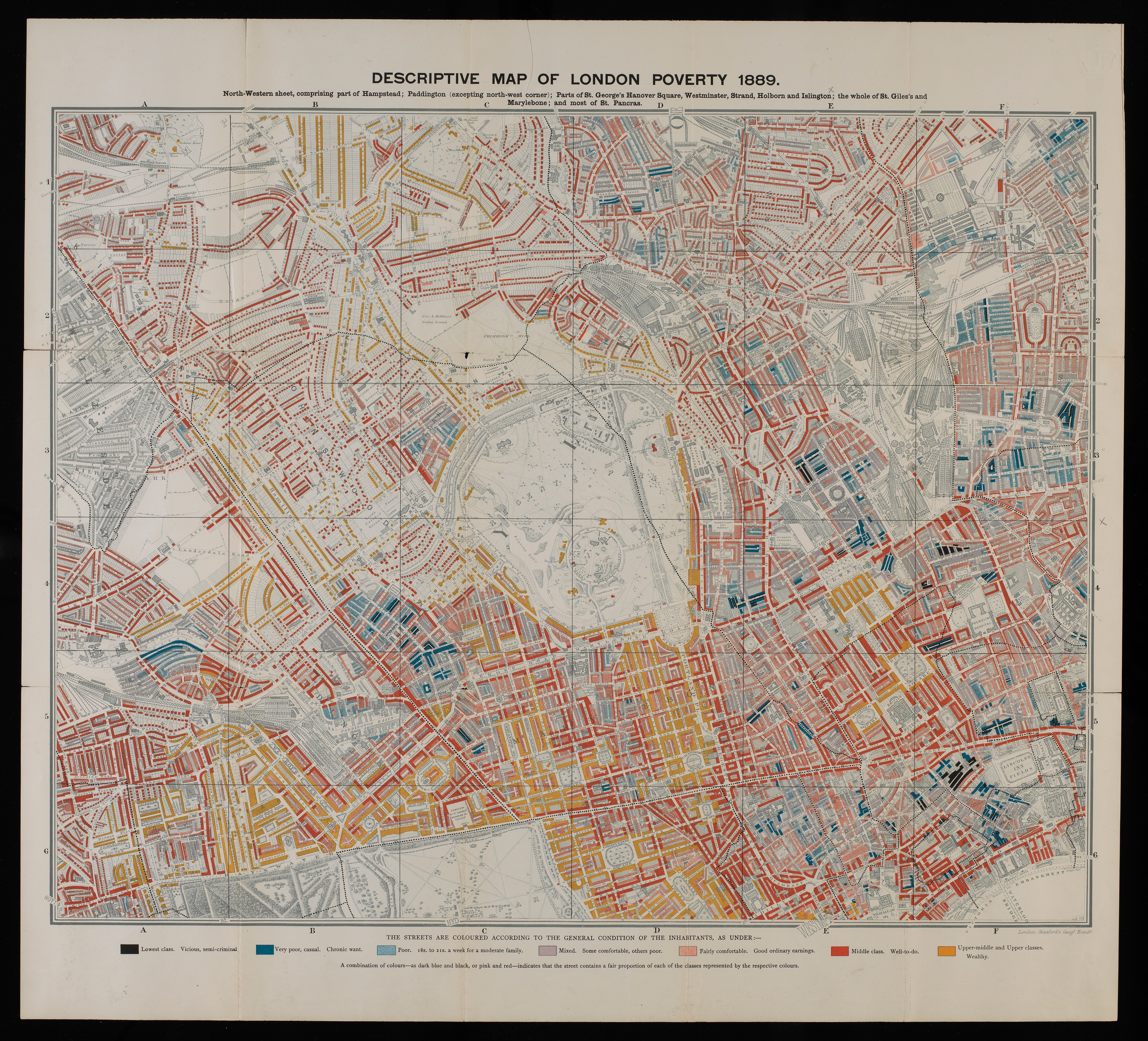
Charles Booth's Poverty Map, 1889, identifies gold (top) and other wealthy incomes for Mayfair, including all this street, and finds poor parts of Soho to the far east; and the height of ground is given in feet.

A cast-iron bollard at the corner of Hill Street and Chesterfield Hill. There are four such bollards in Hill Street, all of them Grade II-listed. They are of an early 19th-century cannon design and are intended to protect pedestrians from large turning vehicles cutting the corner. The cast lettering, obscured by many layers of black paint, reads "St George's Hanover Square".

This was among the prestigious streets of wealthy London socialites and politicians in the 18th and 19th centuries, and notable residents have included:

- The 7th Earl of Barrymore – No.20
- Lord Brougham – No.5
- Admiral Byng in 1756; in 1757 he was sentenced to death and shot for losing Minorca in the Seven Years' War
- Lord Chief Justice Camden died here in 1794
- Lord Morpeth, 7th Earl of Carlisle was born here in 1802
- Lord Colborne – No.19, where he collected paintings
- Prince Arthur of Connaught and Princess Alexandra, 2nd Duchess of Fife – No. 17 from 1916 to c.1919
- The Countess of Darnley – No.21
- Admiral Philip Durham – No.9
- 1st and 2nd Baron Glentanar – No. 11 (1907 to 1936)
- Master of the Rolls, Sir William Grant – No.21
- 1st Baron Hindlip – No.33
- Sir Abraham Hume, 1st Baronet and his son the 2nd Baronet – variously No.s 17, 19 and 29
- 1st Baron Londesborough
- The 1st Baron Lyttelton, politician and patron of the arts, and his profligate son Thomas
- The Mackintosh of Mackintosh – No.8
- The 1st Earl of Malmesbury died here whilst renting No.21 in 1820
- Philip Metcalfe, distiller and patron of the arts – No.20
- Elizabeth Montagu held literary parties here
- The 1st Baron Revelstoke – No.26
- The Countess of Roden – No.27
- Sir Evelyn Ruggles-Brise – No.41
- The 1st Baron de Tabley, collector and exhibitor of paintings and sculptures of the English school – No.24
- The 10th Marquess of Tweeddale – No.6
- Lady Vane, adulteress whose memoirs appeared in The Adventures of Peregrine Pickle, died here in 1788
- Edward Cavendish, 10th Duke of Devonshire No. 19 from c. 1943 to 1950.
- Sir Charles Welby, 5th Baronet – No.34
- William Windham, politician – No.20
- The 1st Baron Westbury – No.30
- Garnet Wolseley, 1st Viscount Wolseley, field marshal – No.6
