= Robert Forgan =

British politician

Robert Forgan MP

Member of Parliament for West Renfrewshire
- In office 30 May 1929 – 7 October 1931
- Preceded by: Archibald Douglas MacInnes Shaw
- Succeeded by: Henry Scrymgeour-Wedderburn

Personal details
- Born: 10 March 1891 Scotland
- Died: 8 January 1976 (aged 84)
- Party: ILP (until 1929); Labour (1929–1931); New Party (1931–1932); BUF (1932–1934)
- Education: University of Aberdeen, University of Cambridge
- Occupation: Public Health Officer
- Profession: Physician

Robert Forgan (10 March 1891 – 8 January 1976) was a British politician who was a close associate of Oswald Mosley.

== Early life and medical career ==
The Scottish-born Forgan was the son of a Church of Scotland minister. Educated up to doctorate level at Aberdeen Grammar School and the Universities of Aberdeen and Cambridge, he entered the medical profession and served in that capacity in the First World War. Forgan became a leading light in his field, served as vice-president of the Medical Society for the Study of Venereal Diseases and became recognised as a leading expert on sexually-transmitted diseases. He served as a public health officer in Glasgow and in that capacity adopted socialism because of the city's poor conditions.

== Political career ==
=== ILP and New Party ===
Forgan entered local politics as a member of Glasgow Council after he had seen active service in the war. Initially a member of the Independent Labour Party, he was elected to Parliament for West Renfrewshire in the 1929 general election. An early triumph saw him secure the installation of a ventilation system into the House of Commons, but he afterward became a fairly marginal figure. Forgan was one of the signatories of the Mosley Memorandum, which outlined his political vision and soon followed Mosley into the New Party when it was set up. He had officially left the Labour Party on 24 February 1931 and sometime that year co-authored with Adam Marshall Diston The New Party and the ILP (written as an appeal to ILP members). He was appointed to a council for policy and strategy formation that was set up to decide the running of the party and also acted as Chief Whip during the New Party's brief run in Parliament.

At the 1931 general election, Forgan polled 1,304 votes in West Renfrewshire in what represented one of the best results for the New Party in a disappointing election. A close friend of Oswald Mosley, Forgan was godfather to his son Michael.

=== British Union of Fascists ===
With Mosley having embraced fascism, Forgan followed his lead and on Mosley's behalf led unsuccessful talks with the British Fascists that were aimed at having that movement taken over by the New Party. Forgan joined Mosley's British Union of Fascists and was initially Director of Organisation. The administrative role did not prove suitable, and soon, he became an important background figure who arranged private functions with leading businessmen in an attempt to secure support for Mosley and organised the January Club to this end. Forgan was keen to stress that the BUF had no ban on Jews despite the activities of Adolf Hitler. Indeed, Forgan attempted to court influential Jews, such as Liberal MP Harry Nathan and Sir Philip Magnus-Allcroft, 2nd Baronet, through the January Club and even held meetings with the leaders of the Board of Deputies of British Jews. Forgan was also keen to keep the BUF aloof from rival far-right groups such as the Imperial Fascist League as he felt that it was essential to avoid making the BUF seem too foreign in ideological terms.

As a result of his work, Forgan was promoted to deputy leader. He held that position until 1934, when he left the BUF because of its drift towards anti-Semitism. Robert Skidelsky has argued that Forgan's conversion to fascism had always been at best half-hearted and had more to do with his personal loyalty to Mosley, which had largely disappeared. Forgan particularly disliked the growing influence of William Joyce, a staunch anti-Semite, who replaced Wilfred Risdon, a colleague of Forgan from the ILP and the New Party, as Director of Propaganda the same year. Forgan took no further role in politics.

== Sources ==
- R. Benewick, Political Violence and Public Order, London: Allan Lane, 1969,
- S. Dorril, Blackshirt – Sir Oswald Mosley and British Fascism, London: Penguin, 2007
- R. Griffiths, Fellow Travellers on the Right, Oxford University Press, 1983
- M. Pugh, Hurrah for the Blackshirts: Fascists and Fascism in Britain Between the Wars, Pimlico, 2006
- R. Skidelsky, Oswald Mosley, Macmillan, 1981

Parliament of the United Kingdom
Preceded by McInnes Shaw	Member of Parliament for West Renfrewshire; 1929–1931	Succeeded by Henry Scrymgeour-Wedderburn
