= Abbey, Renfrewshire =

Civil parish in Renfrewshire, Scotland

Coordinates: 55.838°N 4.404°W

Abbey, or sometimes Abbey Paisley, is a civil parish in Renfrewshire, Scotland traditionally centred on the towns of Paisley and Johnstone and including the smaller settlements of Elderslie, Inkerman, Hurlet, Nitshill, the Dovecothall area of Barrhead, and the hamlets of Thorn and Quarrelton, now subsumed into Johnstone. The parish owes its name to Paisley Abbey, the central religious site in the county and the parish church.

The town of Paisley fell entirely within the Abbey Parish until 1736, when three parishes were formed within the burgh: High, Middle and Laigh (Low). A small portion of the Abbey Parish remained within the burgh after this time. For religious purposes, the towns of Johnstone and Elderslie formed their own quoad sacra parishes.

Following the decline in the importance of parishes in Scotland for local government, the parochial institutions of Abbey Parish have been replaced with various separate community councils serving the towns and villages, with a number representing the various areas of Paisley.
