= Sir Thomas Glen-Coats, 1st Baronet =

Scottish businessman and Liberal Party politician

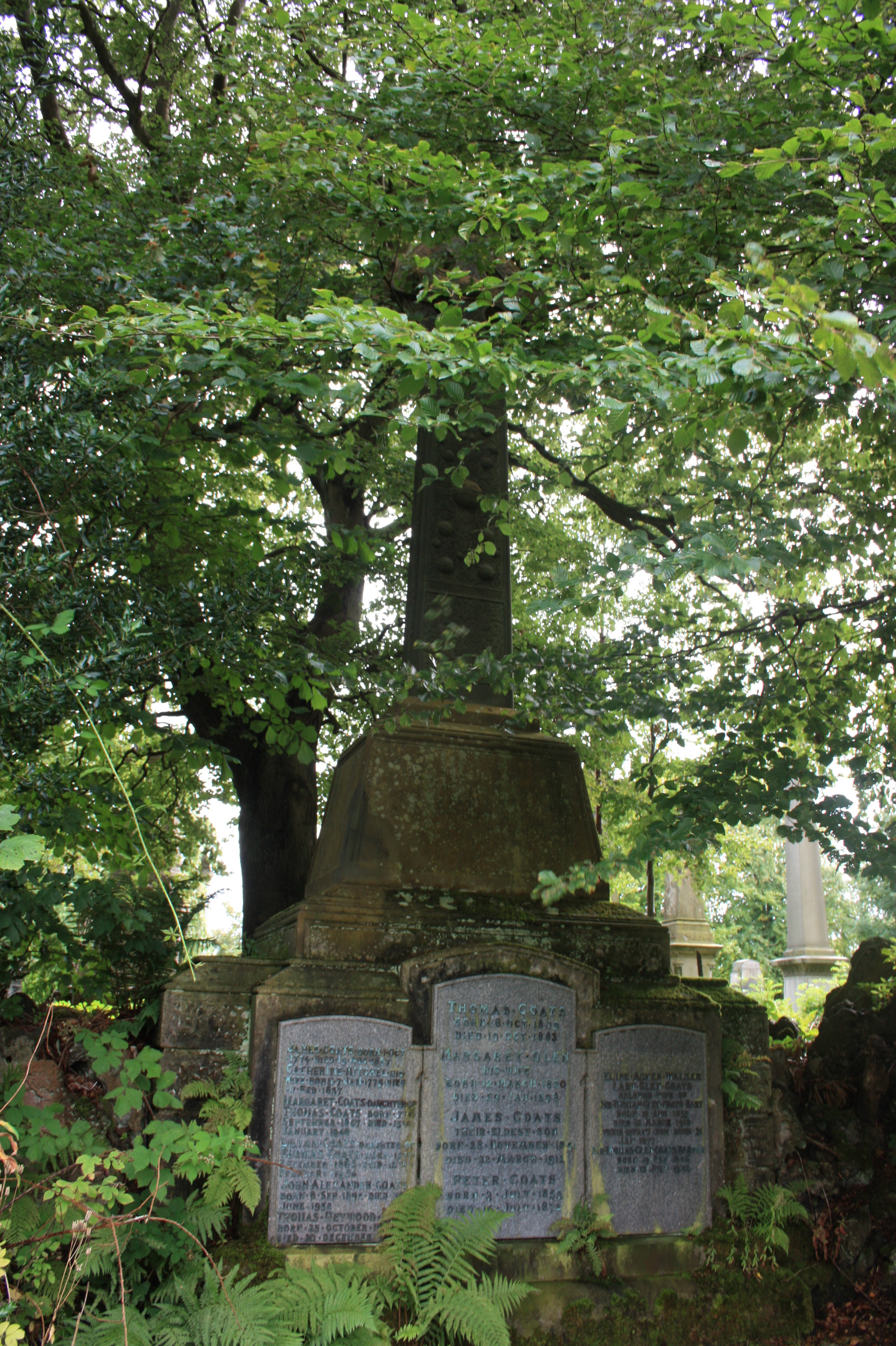
The grave of Sir Thomas Coats, Woodside Cemetery, Paisley

Sir Thomas Glen Glen-Coats, 1st Baronet, CB, VD (19 February 1846 – 12 July 1922) was a Scottish businessman and Liberal Party politician.

== Biography ==
Glen-Coats was a Director of the thread-making firm of J. & P. Coats. He was created a Baronet, of Ferguslie Park in the Parish of Abbey in the County of Renfrew, in 1894. He took the additional name of Glen before that of Coats by Royal Licence when he was created a baronet. The name Glen comes from his mother's family and his first cousin, Matthew Arthur, 1st Baron Glenarthur, likewise added Glen when he was raised to the peerage.

He stood for Renfrewshire West in 1900 but narrowly lost. However, he narrowly won the seat in 1906, He stood down in January 1910. He was also Lord Lieutenant of Renfrewshire between 1908 and 1922.

He was honorary colonel of the 6th Argyll and Sutherland Highlanders and was awarded the Volunteer Decoration in 1892.

He is buried with his family at the summit of Woodside Cemetery in western Paisley.

== Family ==
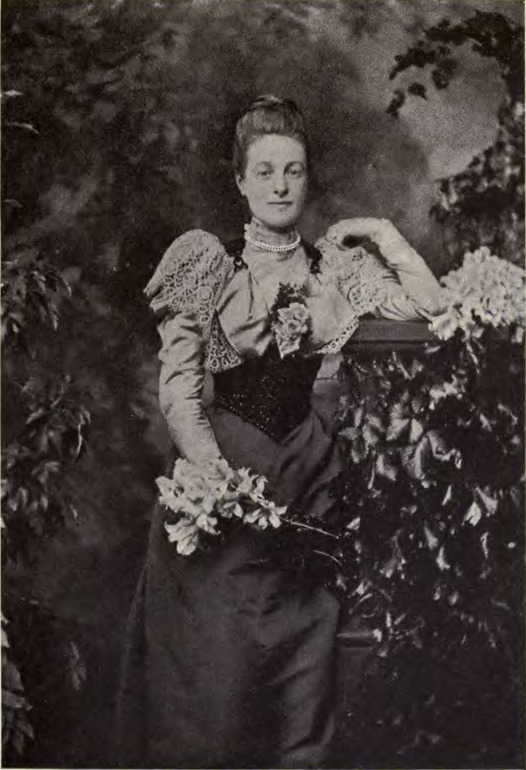
Elise Agnes Walker, Lady Glen-Coats

Thomas Glen-Coats married Elise Agnes Walker (1855-1910), daughter of Alexander Walker, Esquire, merchant, of Montreal, in 1876. She was identified with Liberal associations and interests in the West of Scotland. Their eldest son was Sir Thomas Glen-Coats, 2nd Baronet, an Olympic sailor. In July 1902, their daughter opened the new sanatorium for consumptives at Athronhill, Scotland. The family donated $10,000 to the London Cancer Research Fund.

== Election results ==
General election 1900: Renfrewshire West
Party	Candidate	Votes	%	±%
Conservative	Charles Bine Renshaw	4,323		
Liberal	Sir Thomas Glen Glen-Coats	4,053		

General election 1906: Renfrewshire West
Party	Candidate	Votes	%	±%
Liberal	Sir Thomas Glen Glen-Coats	5,858	56.6	
Conservative	J. C. Cunninghame	4,490	43.4	

Parliament of the United Kingdom
Preceded by Charles Renshaw	Member of Parliament for West Renfrewshire; 1906 – January 1910	Succeeded by James William Greig
Honorary titles
Preceded by Lord Blythswood	Lord Lieutenant of Renfrewshire; 1908–1922	Succeeded by Sir Hugh Shaw-Stewart, Bt
Baronetage of the United Kingdom
New creation	Baronet (of Ferguslie Park); 1894–1922	Succeeded by Thomas Glen-Coats
