= East Renfrewshire by-election =

East Renfrewshire by-election may refer to one of three parliamentary by-elections held for the British House of Commons constituency of East Renfrewshire, in Scotland:

- 1926 East Renfrewshire by-election
- 1930 East Renfrewshire by-election
- 1940 East Renfrewshire by-election

== See also ==
- East Renfrewshire (UK Parliament constituency)
