= 1940 East Renfrewshire by-election =

UK parliamentary by-election

The 1940 East Renfrewshire by-election was a parliamentary by-election held on 9 May 1940 for the British House of Commons constituency of East Renfrewshire in Scotland.

== Previous MP ==
The seat had become vacant when the constituency's Unionist Member of Parliament (MP), the Marquess of Clydesdale, succeeded to the peerage as Duke of Hamilton. He had been East Renfrewshire's MP since winning the seat at a by-election in 1930.

== Candidates ==
During the Second World War unopposed by-elections were common, since the major parties had agreed not to contest by-elections when vacancies arose in seats held by the other parties; contests occurred only when independent candidates or minor parties chose to stand.

The Unionist candidate in East Renfrewshire, Guy Lloyd, therefore did not face a Labour Party or Liberal candidate. However, the Independent Labour Party (ILP) did not support the electoral truce, and Annie Maxton (sister of ILP leader James Maxton) stood as an ILP candidate in the by-election.

== By-election outcome ==
On a much-reduced turnout, the result was a massive victory for Lloyd, who won 80.7% of the votes. He remained East Renfrewshire's MP until he stepped down at the 1959 election.

== Previous election ==
General election, 1935: East Renfrewshire
Party	Candidate	Votes	%	±%
Unionist	Douglas Douglas-Hamilton	35,121	55.6	−3.8
Labour Co-op	James Barr	21,475	34.0	+7.3
SNP	Oliver Brown	6,593	10.4	−3.5
Majority		13,646	21.6	−11.1
Turnout		63,189	75.9	−4.8
Unionist hold		Swing	−6.6	

== Result ==
East Renfrewshire by-election, 9th May 1940
Party	Candidate	Votes	%	±%
Unionist	Guy Lloyd	34,316	80.7	+25.1
Ind. Labour Party	Annie Maxton	8,206	19.3	N/A
Majority		26,110	61.4	+39.8
Turnout		42,522	43.4	−32.5
Unionist hold		Swing		

== Next election ==
General election, 1945: East Renfrewshire
Party	Candidate	Votes	%	±%
Unionist	Guy Lloyd	42,310	53.6	−2.0
Labour Co-op	D. McArthur	36,634	46.4	+12.4
Majority		5,676	7.2	−14.4
Turnout		78,944	67.2	−8.7
Unionist hold		Swing		

== See also ==
- East Renfrewshire constituency
- East Renfrewshire
- 1926 East Renfrewshire by-election
- 1930 East Renfrewshire by-election
- List of United Kingdom by-elections (1931–1950)
