= Robert Laidlaw (politician) =

British businessperson, philanthropist and politician (1856–1915)

Robert Laidlaw

Sir Robert Laidlaw KT (15 January 1856 – 3 November 1915) was a philanthropist, entrepreneur and British Liberal Party politician.

== Early life and education ==
He was born on 13 January 1856, at Bonchester Bridge, Roxburghshire, the son of William Laidlaw and Agnes Purdom. He was educated at Kirkton and Denholm Parish Schools.

== Business career ==
Robert Laidlaw started work in Hawick, and later joined the wholesale textile trade in London.

In the summer of 1875 he went to the South African diamond fields. Having travelled in Asia, Africa and America, Laidlaw came to India in 1877, and began a long residence in Calcutta, now Kolkata, lasting for about twenty years.

In the year 1882, in Calcutta, he established the business house Whiteaway, Laidlaw, and Company. Soon, Whiteaway opened branches in about twenty cities in India and the Straits Settlements, including Shanghai, Singapore, Penang, Kuala Lumpur, Ipoh, Taiping, Seremban, Klang, Malacca and Telok Anson.

Laidlaw was a proprietor of tea estates in Darjeeling district and of rubber estates in the Federated Malay States. He was chairman of Whiteaway, Laidlaw and Co. and Duncan Durian Rubber Estate, Ltd., till his death in 1917. He was a director of the Pilot Insurance Corporation.

== Religion and philanthropy ==
Laidlaw sponsored and financed many educational institutions in India and overseas including Calcutta Boys' School and The Laidlaw Memorial School and Junior College, Ketti, formerly in Kodaikanal.

== Political career ==
Laidlaw was a member of the Reform, National Liberal, and Glasgow Liberal Clubs. In January 1906, standing for the first time, he was elected Liberal MP for Renfrewshire East, at the General Election, gaining the seat from the Conservatives. He was defeated in the January 1910 United Kingdom general election and did not seek election again.

In 1908 he was appointed British Commissioner to the International Opium Commission in Shanghai. He was knighted in 1909 and was admitted to the Most Ancient and Most Noble Order of the Thistle (an order of chivalry associated with Scotland).

== Personal life ==
He married Mary Eliza, daughter of Captain W. Blow Collins and widow of W. L. Francis, of the India Office in 1879, and had three daughters – Ethel, Mildred, and Dorothy. A son, William, died in infancy.

Laidlaw died on 3 November 1915, aged 59, at his home, 13 St Paul's Churchyard, London, and is buried at St. Luke's Cemetery, Bromley, Greater London.

He was a fellow of the Royal Geographical Society.

== Election results ==
General election 1906: Renfrewshire East
Party	Candidate	Votes	%	±%
Liberal	Robert Laidlaw	6,896	50.3	
Conservative	Sir Michael Hugh Shaw-Stewart	6,801	49.7	

General election Jan 1910: Renfrewshire East
Party	Candidate	Votes	%	±%
Conservative	Capt John Gilmour	9,645		
Liberal	Sir Robert Laidlaw	8,771		

Parliament of the United Kingdom
Preceded by Sir Hugh Shaw-Stewart	Member of Parliament for East Renfrewshire; 1906 – January 1910	Succeeded by Sir John Gilmour
