= Frederick Boothby =

Scottish political activist (1909-1979)

Major Frederick Alexander Colquhoun Boothby (1 September 1909 – 27 February 1979) was a Scottish nationalist military and paramilitary leader.

== Early life ==
The cousin of Conservative MP Bob Boothby, Frederick Boothby served in the British Army during World War II, where he led the No.1 Liaison Team in Kalawsk (now known as Węgliniec). Andrew Murray Scott and Iain Macleay claim that he also served in counter-intelligence. He left the Army in 1953, at the rank of captain, but was granted the honorary rank of major in the Army Reserve.

Following the war, Boothby moved to Hertfordshire where he became involved in the local folklore group. However, rumours about rituals taking place on his property involving naked youths and blood rites received publicity in the national press, and he abruptly moved to Broughton in the Scottish Borders.

== Scottish nationalism ==
Boothby became a keen Scottish nationalist, and in 1963 launched his own newsletter, Sgian Dubh. He was a founder of the 1320 Club in 1967, initially with the title "organiser", and was soon appointed as its secretary. The club united radical nationalists, including Hugh MacDiarmid, Oliver Brown, Wendy Wood and Douglas Young. However, Boothby was unique among its members in calling for a "Scottish Liberation Army", and it was these calls which led the Scottish National Party to prohibit its members from also joining the 1320 Club.

== Paramilitary activity ==
Without the knowledge of the 1320 Club's other members, Boothby formed the "Army of the Provisional Government". He took advice from Matt Lygate of the Workers Party of Scotland; Lygate did not become involved, perhaps because Boothby's other political views tended towards the far right, but Lygate publicly defended the paramilitary activities of Boothby's group. Initially, the group had little substance, and confined its activities to hoax bomb threats and throwing bricks through windows, but in 1975 it conducted bombings at electricity pylons and oil pipelines. This ran the group's funds dry, and members attempted a bank robbery to obtain more cash. This was a disaster; the bank they attempted to rob was closed, and Boothby was arrested. He was convicted of conspiracy, and received a sentence of three years, considered surprisingly light.

Doubts have arisen over whether Boothby was a double-agent working for the British secret service at the time of his paramilitary activity. As early as 1972, MacDiarmid wrote in the 1320 Club's magazine "...if Boothby is playing a double-game, he must be exposed and got rid of".
