= Joseph Johnstone =

Scottish politician

Member of Parliament for East Renfrewshire
- In office 14 December 1918 – 26 October 1922
- Preceded by: John Gilmour
- Succeeded by: Robert Nichol

Personal details
- Born: 1860 Salford, Greater Manchester, England
- Died: 13 January 1931 (aged 70–71)
- Party: Liberal
- Spouse: Jane Clerk (m. 1882; died 1917)

Joseph Johnstone (1860 – 13 January 1931) was a Scottish Liberal politician.

== Family and education ==
Johnstone was born in Salford but was of Scottish descent. He was the eldest son of Robert Johnstone a cabinet manufacturer. He was educated at Crummock School in Beith in Ayrshire, a town renowned for its furniture making industries. In 1882 he married Jane Clerk, the daughter of Alexander Muir of Beith and they had two sons and three daughters. Johnstone was widowed in 1917 and did not remarry.

== Career ==
Jonhstone followed his father into the furniture business, going on to become head of his own furniture manufacturing concern with works situated at Lochwinnoch.

== Local government service ==
Johnstone was first elected as a member of Renfrewshire County Council when it came into existence in 1889. He served as Chairman of Renfrewshire National Insurance Committee, Chairman of Renfrewshire Tuberculosis Committee and Chairman of Renfrewshire Joint Sanatorium Board.

== Parliament ==
Johnstone also had parliamentary ambitions and was adopted as Liberal candidate for the constituency of East Renfrewshire. Reflecting his interest in promoting effective business activity, he successfully moved a resolution encouraging the creation of joint industrial councils as a means of promoting cooperation between capital and labour and avoiding industrial strife, at a conference of the Council of the Scottish Liberal Association in Glasgow in November 1918.

In 1918 Johnstone was elected as Coalition Liberal MP for Renfrewshire East in a straight fight with the Labour candidate Robert Spence. The seat had been Conservative held at the two previous general elections of January and December 1910 but the Tories did not oppose Johnstone in 1918, presumably indicating that he had received the Coalition Coupon.

But Johnstone, while one of those Liberals who supported Lloyd George and the need for a strong government to prosecute the war, criticised the use of the coupon and looked forward to Liberal reunion. After the war ended, Johnstone said that he would be one of a number of Liberals elected in 1918 as supporters of the Coalition who would stand at the next general election as Liberals ‘without prefix or suffix’. Notwithstanding this, he was still sufficiently closely associated with Lloyd George that when the 1922 general election came Johnstone was first shown in the national press as a National Liberal. By the time nominations were declared however, his description had changed to straightforward Liberal.

In 1922 Johnstone was opposed by both Labour and Conservative opponents and came third behind both the successful Labour man Robert Nichol and the Tory, Sir Frederick Lobnitz, winning just 17.5% of the overall poll. Johnstone did not stand for Parliament again.

== Other appointments ==
Johnstone also sat as a Justice of the Peace for the county of Renfrewshire.

== Honours ==
In July 1918, Johnstone was awarded the OBE for services to the Scottish War Aims Committee in the King's Birthday Honours list. This organisation was a branch of the National War Aims Committee set up in 1917, with Lloyd George, H H Asquith, Bonar Law and George Barnes as joint presidents. Its official address was number 12 Downing Street. The committee's formal aim was "to keep before the nation both the causes of the war and the necessity of continuing the struggle until the forces which produced the conflict are destroyed" and was effectively an instrument for keeping up public morale, countering war-weariness and pacifism and encouraging pro-war propaganda. It was founded following revolutionary activities in Russia, French army mutinies and a series of labour strikes in Britain in May 1917.

Johnstone continued to take seriously the issue of the war and the honouring of the war dead. In April 1920, he performed the unveiling of the war memorial for the parish of Eaglesham, on the outer wall of the lower part of the steeple of the parish church.

Parliament of the United Kingdom
Preceded by John Gilmour	Member of Parliament for East Renfrewshire; 1918–1922	Succeeded by Robert Nichol
