= Eastwood (UK Parliament constituency) =

UK Parliament constituency (1983–2005)

- Former county constituency for the House of Commons
- Boundary of Eastwood in Scotland for the 2001 general election
- Subdivision: Strathclyde
- Major settlements: Newton Mearns and Giffnock

1983–2005
- Seats: One
- Created from: East Renfrewshire
- Replaced by: East Renfrewshire

Eastwood was a county constituency represented in the House of Commons of the Parliament of the United Kingdom from 1983 until 2005. It elected one Member of Parliament (MP) by the first-past-the-post system of election.

== History ==
The constituency was created for the 1983 general election, when it partially replaced the former East Renfrewshire constituency, following changes in 1975 to local government boundaries.

The East Renfrewshire constituency was re-established for the 2005 general election, with the same boundaries as the Eastwood constituency. Despite the change of name, it is the only constituency in mainland Scotland whose boundaries were unchanged by the 2005 revision of Scottish constituencies.

In 1999, an Eastwood Scottish Parliament constituency was created with the name and boundaries of the Eastwood Westminster constituency. However, while this constituency still exists, its boundaries are now different from the East Renfrewshire UK Parliament seat.

== Boundaries ==
The constituency lay to the south of Glasgow and included Clarkston, Newton Mearns, Eaglesham, Barrhead and Neilston. It has exactly the same boundary as the modern East Renfrewshire constituency.

== Members of Parliament ==
Election	Member	Party
1983	Allan Stewart	Conservative
1997	Jim Murphy	Labour
2005	constituency renamed: see East Renfrewshire	

== Election results ==
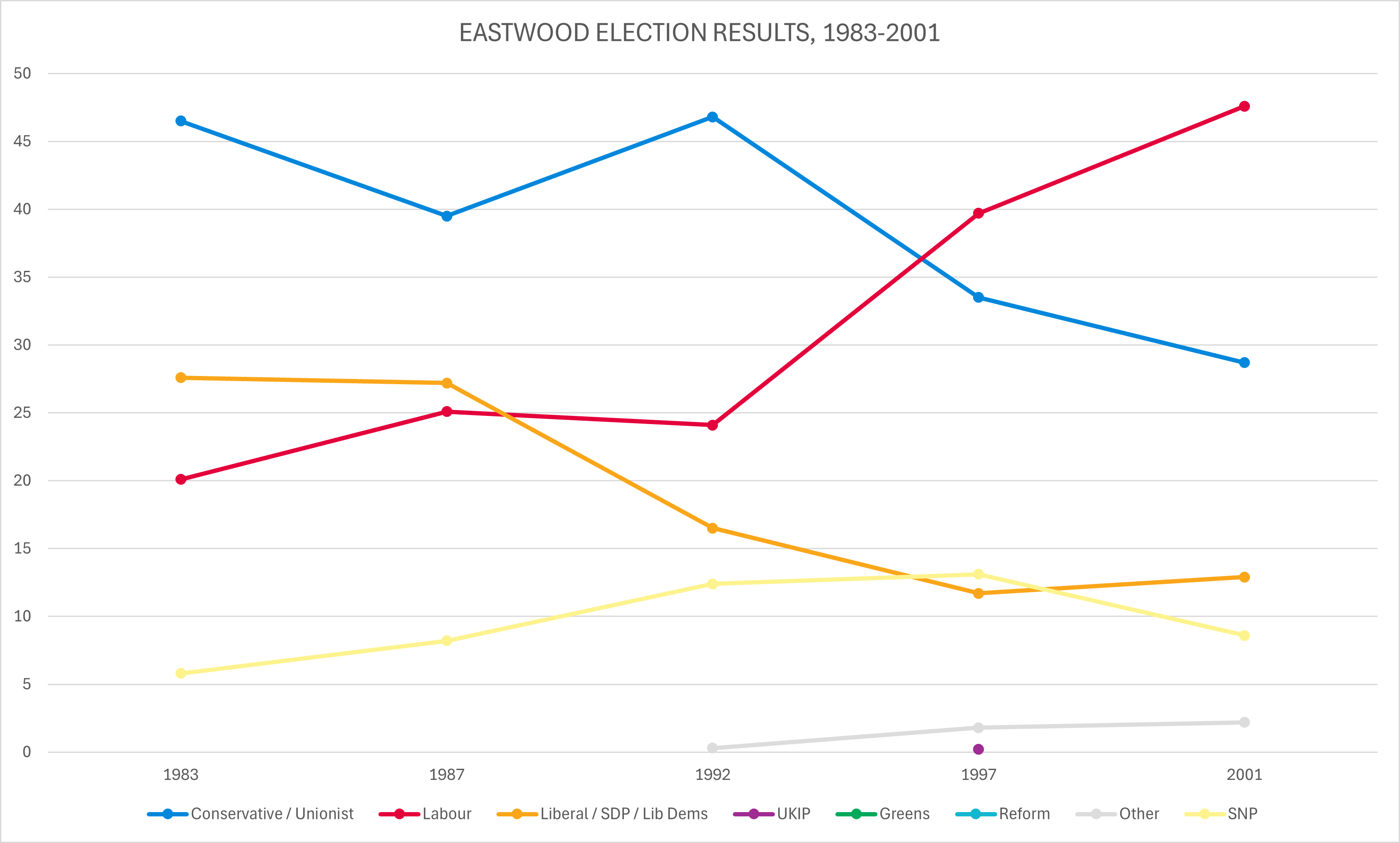
Election results 1983-2001

=== Elections of the 1980s ===
General election 1983: Eastwood
Party	Candidate	Votes	%	±%
Conservative	Allan Stewart	21,072	46.5	−2.8
SDP	James Pickett	12,477	27.6	+9.0
Labour	James McGuire	9,083	20.1	−3.9
SNP	Jenny Herriot	2,618	5.8	−2.2
Majority		8,595	18.9	
Turnout		45,250	72.6	
Conservative win (new seat)				

General election 1987: Eastwood
Party	Candidate	Votes	%	±%
Conservative	Allan Stewart	19,388	39.5	−7.0
SDP	Ralph Leishman	13,374	27.2	−0.4
Labour	Peter Grant-Hutchinson	12,305	25.1	+5.0
SNP	James Findlay	4,033	8.2	+2.4
Majority		6,014	12.3	−6.6
Turnout		49,100	79.4	+6.8
Conservative hold		Swing	−3.3	

=== Elections of the 1990s ===
General election 1992: Eastwood
Party	Candidate	Votes	%	±%
Conservative	Allan Stewart	24,124	46.8	+7.3
Labour	Peter Alexander Grant-Hutchinson	12,436	24.1	−1.0
Liberal Democrats	Miss Moira Craig	8,493	16.5	−10.7
SNP	Paul Henderson Scott	6,372	12.4	+4.2
Natural Law	Dr. Lee Fergusson	146	0.3	New
Majority		11,688	22.7	+10.4
Turnout		51,571	81.0	+1.6
Conservative hold		Swing	+4.2	

General election 1997: Eastwood
Party	Candidate	Votes	%	±%
Labour	Jim Murphy	20,766	39.7	+15.6
Conservative	Paul Cullen	17,530	33.5	−13.1
SNP	Douglas Arthur Yates	6,826	13.1	+0.5
Liberal Democrats	Christopher Michael Mason	6,110	11.7	−4.7
Referendum	David Ian Miller	497	1.0	New
ProLife Alliance	Dr. Manar Tayan	393	0.8	New
UKIP	Douglas McPherson	130	0.2	New
Majority		3,236	6.2	N/A
Turnout		52,252	77.4	−3.6
Labour gain from Conservative		Swing	+14.4	

=== Elections of the 2000s ===
General election 2001: Eastwood
Party	Candidate	Votes	%	±%
Labour	Jim Murphy	23,036	47.6	+7.9
Conservative	Raymond Robertson	13,895	28.7	−4.8
Liberal Democrats	Allan Richard Morison Steele	6,239	12.9	+1.2
SNP	Stewart Maxwell	4,137	8.6	−4.5
Scottish Socialist	Peter Joseph Murray	814	1.7	New
Independent	Dr. Manar Tayan	247	0.5	New
Majority		9,141	18.9	+12.7
Turnout		48,368	70.7	−7.6
Labour hold		Swing	+6.3	
