= Lloyd baronets of Rhu (1960) =

Lloyd baronets
- Escutcheon of the Lloyd baronets of Rhu
- Creation date: 1960
- Status: extant
- Seat(s): Rhu, Scotland
- Motto: Honorabile et fortiter, Honourably and bravely
- Arms: Per bend Sable and Gules a lion rampant regardant Argent goutté of the second surmounted of a fess Or charged with a barrulet dancette Azure a bordure invected of the fourth.
- Crest: A demi-lion argent goutté and langued Gules holding in bend forward two spears Sable points upwards Or.

The Lloyd baronetcy, of Rhu in the County of Dunbarton, was created in the Baronetage of the United Kingdom on 23 July 1960 for the politician Sir Guy Lloyd.

== Lloyd baronets, of Rhu (1960) ==
- Sir (Ernest) Guy Richard Lloyd, 1st Baronet (1890–1987)
- Sir Richard Ernest Butler Lloyd, 2nd Baronet (1928–2022)
- Sir Richard Timothy Butler Lloyd, 3rd Baronet (born 1956)

The heir apparent is the baronet's son, Sebastian George Butler Lloyd (born 1996).
