= Ronald MacDonald Douglas =

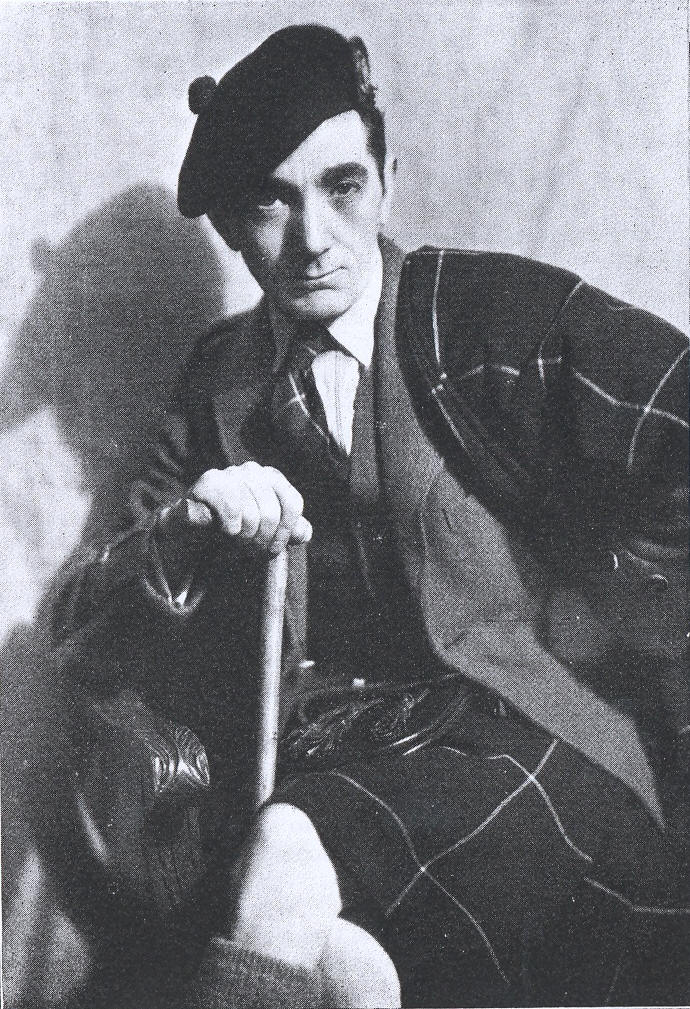
- Douglas in 1936
- Born: 1896
- Died: 1984 (aged 87–88)
- Occupation: Folklorist
- Writing career
- Subject: Celtic Folklore
- Notable works: The Scottish Book of Lore and Folklore

Ronald MacDonald Douglas was the pseudonym of Ronald Edmonston (1896–1984), a Scottish author, actor and political figure known for his works compiling Scottish folklore and his involvement in the 1320 Club. Douglas was the editor of Catalyst, the magazine of the 1320 Club, following the removal of John Herdman.

== Biography ==
Ronald Edmonston was born in 1896. By 1930 he was running a theatre in Dún Laoghaire.

In 1935, Douglas was apprehended by British agents in Geneva while attempting to buy ordnance. Though released, he was warned not to return to Scotland. In 1938 Douglas was invited to visit the Brown House in Munich and met with Rudolf Hess. After Douglas returned to Scotland he was charged with high treason, and athough the charges were dropped, Douglas fled to Ireland, where he stayed until after the war.

Following the strong result for the Scottish National Party in the 1962 West Lothian by-election, Douglas returned to Scotland. In Edinburgh, he helped found the 1320 Club with many other veteran Scottish Nationalists including Hugh MacDiarmid and Wendy Wood.

Ronald MacDonald Douglas died in 1984.

== Bibliography ==
- Strangers Come Home (1935)
- The Scottish Book of Lore and Folklore (1935)
- The Irish Book: A Miscellany of Facts and Fancies, Folklore and Fragments, Poems and Prose to do with Ireland and her People (1936)
- The Sword of Freedom: A Romance of Lord James of Douglas and Scotland's War of Independence (1936)
- Gizzageak : the collected stories of Ronald MacDonald Douglas (1988)
