= Guy Lloyd =

British Unionist politician

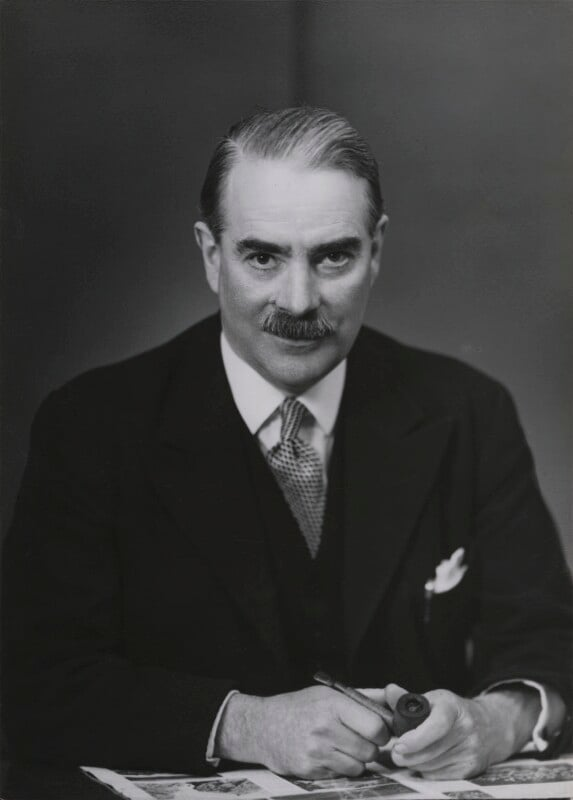
Lloyd in 1950

Sir Ernest Guy Richard Lloyd, 1st Baronet, DSO (7 August 1890 – 22 September 1987) was a British Unionist politician. Lloyd served as Member of Parliament for East Renfrewshire from 1940 to 1959.

Lloyd was born in 1890, son of Major Ernest Thomas Lloyd (1860–1935), formerly of the Bengal Civil Service, and his wife Ethel Mary (died 1961), second daughter of Sir Richard Dansey Green-Price, 2nd Baronet. Lloyd was born into a Shropshire family: one of his paternal uncles, George Butler Lloyd had served as Member of Parliament for Shrewsbury. He was educated at Rossall School and the United Services College. He attended university at Keble College, Oxford, where he graduated BA in 1913, and MA in 1919 after his interval for military service.

At the start of World War I, he entered the King's Shropshire Light Infantry and served with them through the war, being mentioned in despatches and awarded the DSO in 1917. At the rank of Captain he transferred to the Territorial Army Reserve of Officers in 1919. He was promoted Major in 1929 and became second in command of the 5th Battalion of The Loyal Regiment in 1930. He was re-employed at the start of World War II in the Royal Warwickshire Regiment.

Between the wars he had a career in the textile industry, becoming director of cotton spinners James Chadwick and Brothers in Bolton, Lancashire, where he moved home, in 1921, leaving the firm when he moved to Scotland in 1931. He was subsequently administrator of J and P Coats Ltd of Glasgow and Paisley, until he retired in 1938, and director of its subsidiary companies.

Lloyd, who had served as a Town Councillor in Bolton from 1923 to 1931, became Member of Parliament (MP) for East Renfrewshire at a by-election in May 1940, and held the seat until he stood down at the 1959 general election. He was also a DL for Dunbartonshire, a county in which he made his home, in 1953.

He was knighted in 1953 and made a baronet on 23 July 1960, of Rhu in the county of Dunbartonshire.

He married in 1918 Helen Kynaston, daughter of Colonel E.W. Greig of Northcliffe Hall, Styal, Cheshire, and by her had one son and four daughters. She predeceased him in 1984. He died in September 1987, aged 97, when his son succeeded to his baronetcy.

Coat of arms of Guy Lloyd

Crest
A demi-lion argent goutté and langued Gules holding in bend forward two spears Sable points upwards Or.
Escutcheon
Per bend Sable and Gules a lion rampant regardant Argent goutté of the second surmounted of a fess Or charged with a barrulet dancette Azure a bordure invected of the fourth.
Motto
Honorabile Et Fortiter

Parliament of the United Kingdom
Preceded by Marquess of Clydesdale	Member of Parliament for East Renfrewshire; 1940–1959	Succeeded by Betty Harvie Anderson
Baronetage of the United Kingdom
New creation	Baronet (of Rhu); 1960–1987	Succeeded by Richard Ernest Butler Lloyd
