= Kirsten Oswald =

Scottish National Party politician

Kirsten Oswald MSP
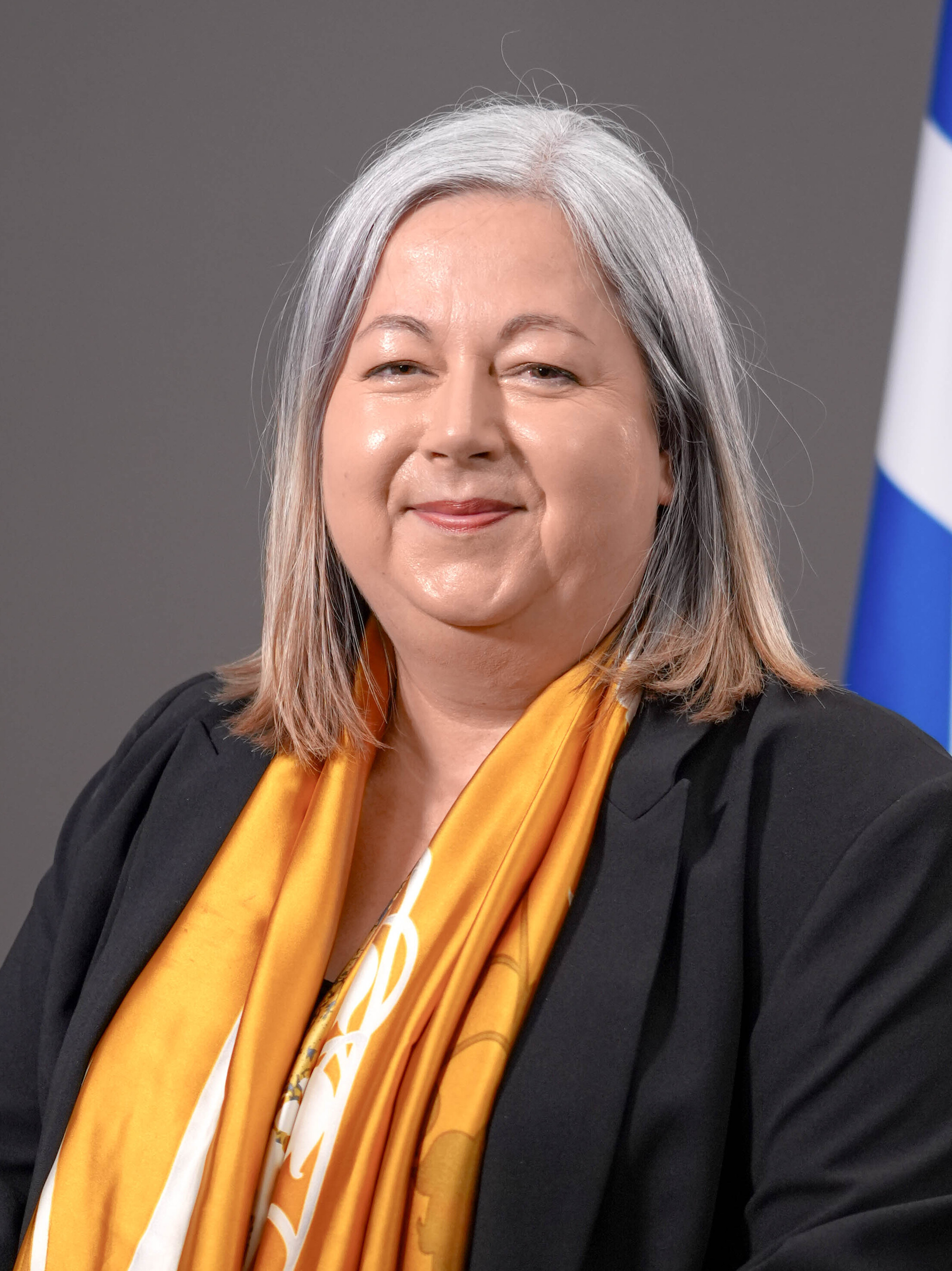
- Official portrait, 2026

Minister for Victims & Community Safety
- Incumbent
- Assumed office 21 May 2026
- First Minister: John Swinney
- Preceded by: Siobhian Brown

SNP Spokesperson for Women and Equalities in the House of Commons
- In office 1 February 2021 – 30 May 2024
- Leader: Ian Blackford; Stephen Flynn
- Preceded by: Anne McLaughlin
- Succeeded by: Office abolished

Deputy Leader of the Scottish National Party in the House of Commons
- In office 7 July 2020 – 6 December 2022
- Leader: Ian Blackford
- Preceded by: Kirsty Blackman
- Succeeded by: Mhairi Black

Member of the Scottish Parliament for Eastwood
- Incumbent
- Assumed office 7 May 2026
- Preceded by: Jackson Carlaw
- Majority: 732 (1.9%)

Member of Parliament for East Renfrewshire
- In office 12 December 2019 – 30 May 2024
- Preceded by: Paul Masterton
- Succeeded by: Blair McDougall
- In office 7 May 2015 – 3 May 2017
- Preceded by: Jim Murphy
- Succeeded by: Paul Masterton

Chairman & Business Convener of the Scottish National Party
- In office 3 November 2018 – 18 November 2023
- Leader: Nicola Sturgeon
- Preceded by: Derek Mackay
- Succeeded by: Angela Constance

Personal details
- Born: Kirsten Frances Oswald; 21 December 1972 (age 53) Dundee, Scotland
- Party: Scottish National Party
- Spouse: Davinder Bedi
- Children: 2
- Education: University of Glasgow

Kirsten Frances Oswald (born 21 December 1972) is a Scottish National Party (SNP) politician who has been MSP for Eastwood since 2026. She also served two terms as the Member of the UK Parliament (MP) for East Renfrewshire, from 2015 to 2017 and subsequently from 2019 to 2024.

She served as the deputy leader of the SNP parliamentary party from 2020 to 2022, as well as Chairman and Business Convener of the Scottish National Party from 2018 to 2023. She was also a SNP Spokesperson for Women and Equalities.

== Early life and education ==
Oswald was born in Dundee to Helen and Ed Oswald. Her mother, Helen, was Provost of Angus Council. She grew up in Carnoustie where she attended Carnoustie High School. She studied history at the University of Glasgow graduating with an MA(Hons) in 1995.

== Political career ==
Oswald became active in the Scottish National Party during the 2014 Scottish independence referendum, serving on the committee of her local Women for Independence group where she was responsible for local food bank collections.

On 30 January 2015, it was announced that Oswald was selected as the SNP candidate for the East Renfrewshire constituency at the 2015 general election. During her campaign, she was criticised for sending letters to Conservative voters asking for their support to beat Labour. Oswald stated that her letters served to contrast voter values with negative campaign tactics from the Conservatives that focused on keeping the SNP out of power.

She won the seat with a majority of 3,718 votes, unseating the Leader of the Scottish Labour Party, Jim Murphy, who had held the seat since Labour's victory 18 years earlier; Murphy resigned from the Scottish Labour leadership on 13 June 2015.

At the 2017 general election, Oswald lost her seat to Paul Masterton of the Conservatives, who won with a majority of 4,712 votes.

In 2018 she was elected Chairman and Business Convener of the SNP, replacing Scottish Government Finance Secretary Derek Mackay.

She was selected by the SNP to contest the East Renfrewshire seat in the 2019 general election, where she was re-elected with a majority of 5,426 votes or 9.8%, larger than her 2015 majority.

On 7 July 2020, she was elected deputy leader of the SNP in the House of Commons, succeeding Kirsty Blackman.

In May 2021, Oswald said that she fundamentally disagreed with her colleague Douglas Chapman on the assessment of support and financial information available to him in his role as party Treasurer. Chapman had stood down from this role in the wake of a probe regarding £600,000 'missing' independence campaign funds being investigated by Police Scotland.

Oswald has repeatedly spoken out about China's reported repression in the House of Commons. In September 2021, Uyghur leaders honoured her for her continued work on their cause, and the World Uyghur Congress publicly thanked her for her support.

On 2 December 2022, the day after Ian Blackford announced he would be stepping down from his role as SNP Westminster leader, Oswald announced that she would be stepping down as deputy Westminster leader as well. "It seems sensible to me that a new leader and new deputy pick up the baton," she said. "And [the party will] have my support to do that."

In January 2023, she was one of a number of Scottish politicians who drew media attention and criticism after being photographed smiling in front of a sign reading 'Decapitate TERFs' and a drawing of a guillotine at a Glasgow rally. The sign was reported to Police Scotland. Fellow MSP Murdo Fraser described the sign as "clearly a hate crime and a public order offence". Oswald later tweeted that the sign, which she described as "horrific", had "not been there when I joined the demo".

Oswald stood for re-election as MP for East Renfrewshire in the 2024 United Kingdom general election, but was defeated by the Labour party candidate.

In February 2026, Oswald was announced as an SNP candidate for West Scotland at the 2026 Scottish Parliamentary Elections.

== Post-parliamentary career ==
Following her defeat at the 2024 UK General Election, Oswald has worked as a Lecturer in Business and Administration at City of Glasgow College.

== Personal life ==
Oswald married Davinder Bedi in 2002; they have two sons. The family moved to East Renfrewshire in 2008. Bedi did not campaign for his wife during the 2015 election campaign, and joined Scottish Labour after the election.

Oswald was head of Human Resources at South Lanarkshire College from May 2002 to May 2015.

Parliament of the United Kingdom
Preceded by Jim Murphy	Member of Parliament for East Renfrewshire; 2015–2017	Succeeded by Paul Masterton
Preceded by Paul Masterton	Member of Parliament for East Renfrewshire; 2019–2024	Succeeded by Blair McDougall
