= James Finlayson (politician) =

James Finlayson (1823 – 17 February 1903) was a British Liberal Party politician.

Finlayson was elected as the member of parliament (MP) for East Renfrewshire in the 1885 general election, but did not stand again at the 1886 election.

Finlayson died at the age of 80.

Parliament of the United Kingdom
New constituency see Renfrewshire	Member of Parliament for East Renfrewshire; 1885–1886	Succeeded by Michael Hugh Shaw-Stewart
