= Betty Harvie Anderson =

British Conservative Party politician

The Right Honourable The Baroness Skrimshire of Quarter OBE PC TD DL

First Deputy Chairman of Ways and Means
- In office 6 July 1970 – 30 October 1973
- Speaker: Selwyn Lloyd
- Preceded by: Harry Gourlay
- Succeeded by: Lance Mallalieu

Member of Parliament for East Renfrewshire
- In office 8 October 1959 – 7 April 1979
- Preceded by: Guy Lloyd
- Succeeded by: Allan Stewart

Personal details
- Born: Margaret Betty Harvie Anderson; 12 August 1913 Glasgow, Scotland, UK
- Died: 7 November 1979 (aged 66)
- Party: Conservative
- Other political affiliations: Unionist
- Spouse: John Skrimshire (m. 1960)
- Parents: Thomas Harvie Anderson (father); Margaret "Nessie" Harvie Shearer (mother)
- Education: St Leonards School

Margaret Betty Harvie Anderson, Baroness Skrimshire of Quarter, OBE, PC, TD, DL (12 August 1913 – 7 November 1979) was a British Conservative Party politician. She was the first woman to become a Deputy Speaker of the House of Commons, which she served as from 1970 to 1973.

== Early life ==
Harvie Anderson was born in Glasgow on 12 August 1913 to Thomas Alexander Harvie Anderson and his wife, Margaret Agnes "Nessie" Harvie Anderson (née Shearer). She was educated at St Leonards School, a private school in St Andrews.

=== Military service ===
In 1938, she joined the Auxiliary Territorial Service (ATS). She was commissioned into the ATS as a company commander (equivalent in rank to captain) on 21 December 1938. When the ATS reorganised and granted full military status in 1941, she was made a second subaltern (equivalent in rank to a second lieutenant) on 30 May.

She saw active service on the Home Front during World War II, including a posting to the River Forth during the German air raids. From 1942 to 1943, she was senior commander (equivalent in rank to major) of a Mixed Heavy Anti-aircraft Regiment. She was ultimately appointed chief commander (equivalent in rank to lieutenant colonel) of a mixed anti-aircraft brigade. She held the post until she left the ATS in 1946.

== Political career ==
In November 1945, Harvie Anderson was elected to Stirlingshire County Council. In 1953, she became leader of the Moderate Group.

Harvie Anderson stood for parliament for West Stirlingshire in 1950 and 1951 and in Sowerby in 1955. She was appointed an Officer of the Order of the British Empire (OBE) in 1956.

She was Member of Parliament (MP) for Renfrewshire East from 1959 to 1979. Although Betty Boothroyd was the first female Speaker of the House of Commons, Harvie Anderson was the first woman to sit in the Speaker's Chair as a Deputy Speaker (Deputy Chairman of Ways and Means) from 1970 to 1973. In the 1970s Harvie Anderson helped turn Conservative Party policy against Scottish devolution which she regarded as a threat to the future of the United Kingdom. She retired as an MP in 1979.

Harvie Anderson was given a life peerage in the 1979 Birthday Honours. She took the unusual title of Baroness Skrimshire of Quarter, of Dunipace in the District of Falkirk, made up of her husband's surname and the estate she owned in Scotland.

On 7 November 1979, within a week of her introduction to the House of Lords, she died suddenly having suffered an asthma attack.

== Personal life ==
On 5 May 1960, Harvie Anderson married John Francis Penrose Skrimshire, a medical doctor and heart specialist. They had no children.

Parliament of the United Kingdom
Preceded by Guy Lloyd	Member of Parliament for East Renfrewshire; 1959–1979	Succeeded by Allan Stewart
