= 1320 Club =

Scottish pro-independence group (1967-1982)

- Named after: Declaration of Arbroath
- Successor: Siol nan Gaidheal
- Formation: 1967; 59 years ago
- Founder: Figures including Frederick Boothby, Hugh MacDiarmid, Oliver Brown, Douglas Young and Wendy Wood
- Dissolved: 1982; 44 years ago
- Purpose: Scottish nationalism, Scottish independence
- Main organ: Catalyst

The 1320 Club was a Scottish nationalist campaign group.

The club was named after the date of the Declaration of Arbroath, a document proclaiming Scotland's independence, It was founded in 1967 by figures including Frederick Boothby, Hugh MacDiarmid, Ronald MacDonald Douglas, Oliver Brown, Douglas Young and Wendy Wood. Most of its founders were members of the Scottish National Party (SNP) who had recently worked together in the Scottish National Congress, which had dissolved in 1964. The club was not limited to SNP figures, but claimed to seek a wider consensus, similar to the early days of the SNP or to the Scottish Covenant Association. In order to further this, membership of the organisation, other than among its leading figures, was kept secret, and was by invitation only. This prompted sharp criticism from Hamish Henderson, who rejected his invitation to join.

Internally, the group initially had a structure based on a political cabinet, led by a "Co-ordinator of Committees", supported by a team of convenors, each with responsibility for a different policy area. Soon, Boothby was appointed Secretary, MacDiarmid as President and Ian Taylor as Vice-President, in a more traditional approach, while later still, some leading members of the organisation were given the title "Scottish Knight Templar".

The club published a journal named Catalyst, edited by Ronald MacDonald Douglas, which covered both cultural and political matters, with poetry by MacDiarmid, and a clear declaration that it would not intervene in elections, which it intended to leave to the SNP. One of the club's first acts was to published a proposed constitution for an independent Scotland, based on that developed by the Scottish National Congress. Another early campaign was for the SNP's parliamentary candidates to commit to a policy of abstentionism in the Westminster parliament, and instead to convene their own body in Edinburgh. It also argued that such a body would have the right to arm itself in defence against England, and this advocacy of paramilitary action led the SNP to expel its members in 1968, amid claims that the group incorporated fascist ideology. Boothby in particular was keen on this approach, having previous called for a "Scottish Liberation Army", and he secretly formed such a group, the "Army of the Provisional Government", which conducted some bombings and a robbery. In 1975, he was convicted of conspiracy and left the group.

During the 1970s, the club strongly suggested that the Stone of Scone which had been returned to London following its theft in the 1950s was not the original, and they gave a stone to St Columba's Church in Dundee which they claimed was genuine. This was not widely believed, and the stone was later transferred to Dull, Perthshire and then in 1989 given to a person who self-identified as a "Scottish Knight Templar".

In 1982, the club merged into Siol nan Gaidheal.
