= Douglas Douglas-Hamilton, 14th Duke of Hamilton =

Scottish aviator and politician (1903–1973)

Air Commodore His Grace The Duke of Hamilton KT GCVO AFC PC DL FRCSE FRGS
- Hamilton in 1943

14th Duke of Hamilton
- Preceded by: Alfred Douglas-Hamilton, 13th Duke of Hamilton
- Succeeded by: Angus Douglas-Hamilton, 15th Duke of Hamilton

Member of the House of Lords
- Lord Temporal
- Life peerage 16 March 1940 – 30 March 1973

Member of Parliament for East Renfrewshire
- In office 28 November 1930 – 16 March 1940
- Preceded by: Alexander Munro MacRobert
- Succeeded by: Sir Guy Lloyd

Personal details
- Born: 3 February 1903 London, England
- Died: 30 March 1973 (aged 70) Edinburgh, Scotland
- Party: Unionist
- Spouse: Lady Elizabeth Ivy Percy (m. 1937)
- Children: Angus Douglas-Hamilton, 15th Duke of Hamilton; James Douglas-Hamilton, Baron Selkirk of Douglas; Lord Hugh Douglas-Hamilton; Lord Patrick Douglas-Hamilton; Lord David Douglas-Hamilton
- Parent(s): Alfred Douglas-Hamilton, 13th Duke of Hamilton; Nina Poore

Military service
- Allegiance: United Kingdom
- Branch/service: Royal Air Force
- Years of service: 1927–1936; 1939–1945
- Rank: Air Commodore
- Commands: No. 602 Squadron RAF, Air Training Corps
- Battles/wars: Second World War
- Awards: Air Force Cross; Mentioned in Despatches

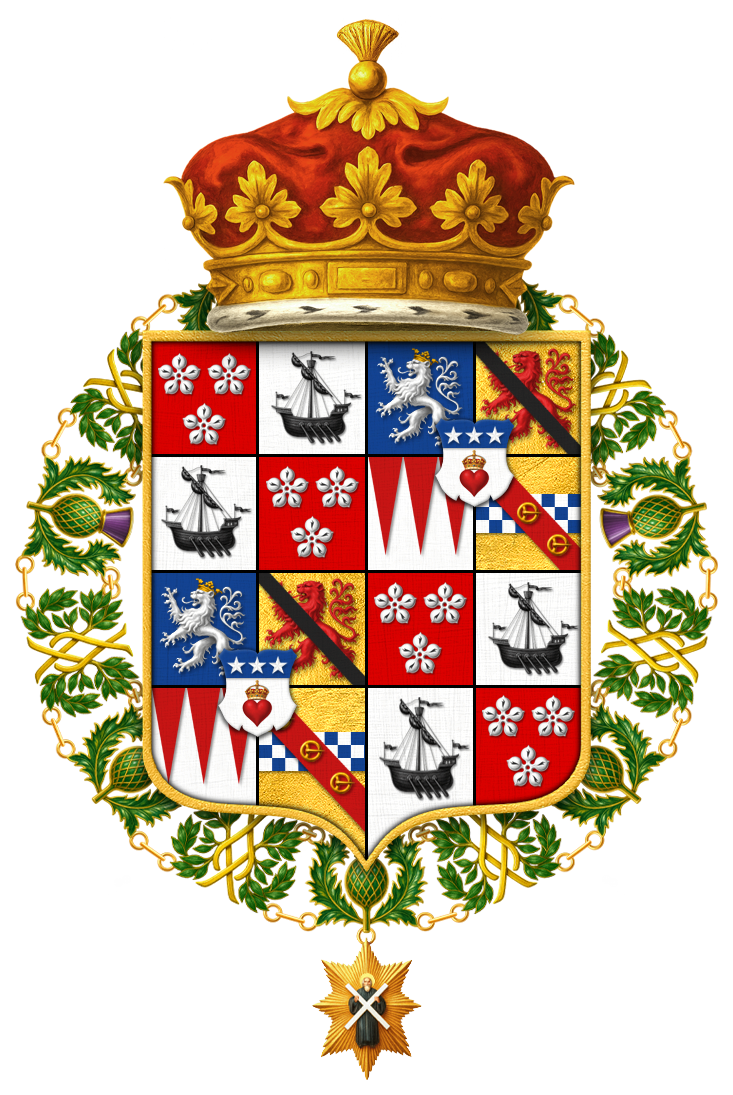
Shield of Arms of Douglas Douglas-Hamilton, 14th Duke of Hamilton and 11th Duke of Brandon, KT, GCVO, AFC, PC, DL, FRCSE, FRGS

Air Commodore Douglas Douglas-Hamilton, 14th Duke of Hamilton and 11th Duke of Brandon (3 February 1903 – 30 March 1973), was a Scottish aristocrat, politician and aviator. He was the first man to fly over Mount Everest. A member of the Unionist Party, he sat in the House of Commons and later in the House of Lords.

During World War II, Hamilton was involved in the 1941 aborted peace mission of Rudolf Hess, the Deputy Führer of the Nazi Party. After making a surprise landing in Scotland, Hess demanded to speak to Hamilton whom he believed was an opinion leader favouring peace with Germany. Hamilton then met with Hess and transmitted his message to Winston Churchill. It was speculated that Hess and Hamilton had been in contact beforehand, but Hamilton was declared in Parliament to be innocent of any breach of security.

== Early life ==
Douglas Douglas-Hamilton was born in Pimlico, London, on 3 February 1903. He was the son of Alfred Douglas-Hamilton, 13th Duke of Hamilton, and his wife, Nina (née Poore). He was educated at Eton College and Balliol College, Oxford, where he gained a Blue in boxing and also rowed for the university. He later gained the Scottish Amateur Middleweight boxing title.

Styled Marquess of Clydesdale before he succeeded his father as the Duke of Hamilton and Keeper of Holyroodhouse, he was appointed as honorary colonel of the 7th (Blythswood) Battalion of the Highland Light Infantry in July 1931. In 1935, in order to experience the life of the employees in his family's coal mines, he worked for a time at the coal face as plain Mr Hamilton, joining a trade union. He was a prominent member of the Scottish Unionist Party during his time as Member of Parliament (MP) for East Renfrewshire from his victory in the 1930 by-election until 1940, when he succeeded to the peerages and joined the House of Lords.

== Air force career and flight over Everest ==
Hamilton became interested in flying at an early age, and served in the Royal Auxiliary Air Force (RAuxAF). He was commissioned in the 602 (City of Glasgow) Squadron as a pilot officer on 4 July 1927, with subsequent and rapid promotions to flying officer (4 January 1929) and to flight lieutenant (15 January 1930). On 6 May 1931, aged 28, the Marquess became the youngest squadron leader of his day, commanding the squadron from 1931 to 1936.

He was involved in one of the more ambitious aeronautical flights of the early twentieth century, sponsored by Lucy, Lady Houston, the Houston-Mount Everest Flight Expedition. Flying in formation higher than any before; Lord Clydesdale, as he was then known, was chief pilot on the first flight over Mount Everest in 1933, flying a Westland PV-3 biplane. The extremity endured by the crews of these aeroplanes helped demonstrate the need for pressurised cabins in modern aircraft. It was also the first detailed and scientific survey of the Himalaya region. Indirectly, the expedition resulted in the formation of Scottish Aviation Ltd (now part of BAE Systems). A documentary film, Wings over Everest, by Ivor Montagu and Geoffrey Barkas, was made of the record-setting flight and won an Academy Award in the United States in 1936.

In recognition of his role in the expedition, he was decorated with the Air Force Cross in the 1935 New Year Honours. As a pioneering early aviator, he was regarded in much the same heroic way as the astronauts a generation later.

He relinquished command of his squadron on 2 September 1936, receiving a promotion to wing commander.

== Second World War, Hess Affair and aftermath ==
A keen sportsman, Hamilton attended the 1936 Summer Olympics in Berlin. He was a member of a multi-party parliamentary group that was invited to observe the games by the German government. Hamilton flew his own plane to Germany.

While in Berlin, he attended numerous functions, including a grand dinner for the British contingent hosted by Joachim von Ribbentrop. At that time, Ribbentrop was the German ambassador to Britain, and had previously met Hamilton in London. At this dinner, Hamilton was introduced to Hitler and other leading members of the Nazi government. Hermann Göring suggested Hamilton should inspect the newly reinstated Luftwaffe, given his professional interest in aviation.

During this trip, Hamilton met the diplomat Albrecht Haushofer, son of the geopolitical academic Karl Haushofer. The younger Haushofer had studied alongside Deputy Fuhrer Rudolf Hess at the Ludwig-Maximilians-Universität München and was then Hess's advisor on foreign affairs.

At the outbreak of war, Hamilton resumed his commission with the honorary rank of air commodore. He was made responsible for the aerial defence of a sector of Southern Scotland and Northern England. He also took command of the Air Training Corps. In 1940, upon his father's death, Hamilton succeeded to the dukedom. He was Mentioned in Dispatches for his war service and was promoted to temporary group captain on 1 June 1941.

=== Hess affair ===
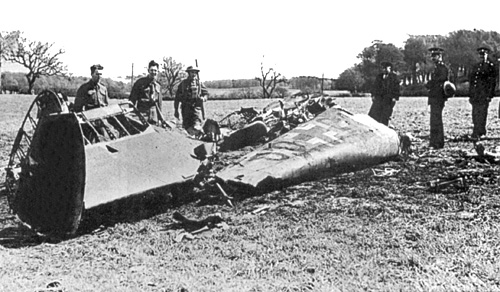
Wreckage of Hess' plane, Eaglesham, Scotland

In August 1940 Hess had a conversation with Albrecht Haushofer, who told him that King George VI was opposed to Winston Churchill and could be persuaded to dismiss Churchill and end the war with Germany. Hess became convinced that Hamilton was one of the leaders of a party opposed to war with Germany, and decided to make contact with the King through Hamilton. On Hess's instructions, Haushofer wrote to Hamilton in September 1940, but the letter was intercepted by MI5 and Hamilton did not see it until March 1941. Unlike Haushofer, Hess did not know Hamilton personally: it was later established that they were both present at a banquet at the 1936 Olympics, but they sat at different tables and never spoke at the time.

Hess eventually decided to go himself on a "peace mission" to the United Kingdom. On 10 May 1941 he parachuted into Scotland, landing at 10:34 pm on Floors Farm, near Eaglesham and close to the Duke's home. He was quickly captured, gave his name as "Alfred Horn", and claimed to be a friend of the Duke of Hamilton. Hess asked to see the Duke, but was instead taken to a local Home Guard post, then a hospital to address the injuries he sustained during his descent and landing.

Hamilton was informed of the prisoner's request and visited him in hospital. Hess revealed his true identity to Hamilton and claimed that he was on a secret mission to negotiate a peace treaty. Hamilton immediately contacted the prime minister, Winston Churchill, and informed him of Hess's arrival and purported mission. Hess was imprisoned by the British authorities until the end of the war and the subsequent Nuremberg trials.

Hamilton came under pressure from the press to explain his role in the affair, with suspicions being raised that he might have been in prior contact with Hess. Questions were asked in the House of Commons. On 22 May Sir Archibald Sinclair, the Secretary of State for Air, gave this statement to the House:

When Deputy Führer Hess came down with his aeroplane in Scotland on 10 May, he gave a false name and asked to see the Duke of Hamilton. The Duke, being apprised by the authorities, visited the German prisoner in hospital. Hess then revealed for the first time his true identity, saying that he had seen the Duke when he was at the Olympic games at Berlin in 1936. The Duke did not recognise the Deputy Führer. He had however, visited Germany for the Olympic games in 1936, and during that time had attended more than one large public function at which German ministers were present. It is, therefore, quite possible that the Deputy Führer may have seen him on one such occasion. As soon as the interview was over, Wing Commander the Duke of Hamilton flew to England and gave a full report of what had passed to the Prime Minister, who sent for him. Contrary to reports which have appeared in some newspapers, the Duke has never been in correspondence with the Deputy Führer. None of the Duke's three brothers, who are, like him, serving in the Royal Air Force has either met Hess or has had correspondence with him. It will be seen that the conduct of the Duke of Hamilton has been in every respect honourable and proper.

Speculation has since continued that Hamilton had been in contact with Hess before 1941, and was informed of his mission. There is, however, no evidence that he was sympathetic to Nazi Germany or associated with an anti-Churchill faction as Hess believed. In 1942, Hamilton successfully sued for libel two Communist Party members who had claimed that he and Hess were friends.

== Offices and positions held ==
As a member of the House of Commons, he was a Privy Counsellor.

He was appointed Lord Steward of the Household in 1940, holding the office until 1964.

He served as Chancellor of the University of St Andrews from 1948 to 1973. He was appointed to the Order of the Thistle on 8 December 1951. He was also a member of the Royal Company of Archers, the Sovereign's bodyguard for Scotland.

He served as Lord High Commissioner to the General Assembly of the Church of Scotland four times, in 1953, 1954, 1955 and 1958.

In 1963 the Duke was made honorary president of the Boys' Brigade; he had been the treasurer since 1938. He was the president of the Air League from 1959 to 1968.

The Duke served as President of the Hamilton Academy FP (former pupils) Rugby Club, 1946–1955.

=== Business positions held ===
- Director of Scottish Aviation Ltd
- Deputy governor of the British Linen Bank
- President of Securicor (Scotland) Ltd
- President of the Building Societies Association
- Chairman of Nationwide Building Society (Scotland)
- Chairman of Norwich Union Life and Fire Insurance Society (Scotland)

== Publications ==
The Pilots' book of Everest – with Flight Lieutenant D.F. McIntyre. Hodge, London, 1936.

== Marriage and issue ==
In 1937 he married Lady Elizabeth Ivy Percy, daughter of Alan Percy, 8th Duke of Northumberland, and had five sons:

- Angus Alan Douglas Douglas-Hamilton, 15th Duke of Hamilton (born 13 September 1938, died 5 June 2010); married three times, with issue from the first
- Lord James Alexander Douglas-Hamilton, Baron Selkirk of Douglas (born 31 July 1942, died 28 November 2023); married Priscilla "Susan" Buchan with issue
- Lord Hugh Malcolm Douglas-Hamilton (born 22 August 1946, died 21 June 1995): married twice, with issue from the first
- Lord Patrick George Douglas-Hamilton (born 2 August 1950); married and has issue
- Lord David Stephen Douglas-Hamilton (born 26 December 1952, died 6 April 2020)

== See also ==
- George Douglas-Hamilton, 10th Earl of Selkirk (1906–1994)
- Lord Malcolm Douglas-Hamilton (1909–1964)
- Lord David Douglas-Hamilton (1912–1944)

Parliament of the United Kingdom
| Preceded by Alexander MacRobert | Member of Parliament for Renfrewshire East; 1930–1940 | Succeeded by Guy Lloyd |
Political offices
| Preceded by The Duke of Buccleuch and Queensberry | Lord Steward; 1940–1964 | Succeeded by The Duke of Westminster |
Academic offices
| Preceded by The Earl Baldwin of Bewdley | Chancellor of the University of St Andrews; 1948–1973 | Succeeded by The Lord Ballantrae |
Peerage of Scotland
| Preceded by Alfred Douglas-Hamilton | Duke of Hamilton; 1940–1973 | Succeeded by Angus Douglas-Hamilton |
Peerage of Great Britain
| Preceded by Alfred Douglas-Hamilton | Duke of Brandon; 1940–1973 | Succeeded by Angus Douglas-Hamilton |
