= Sir Hugh Shaw-Stewart, 8th Baronet =

British politician

Michael Shaw-Stewart

Member of Parliament for East Renfrewshire
- In office 1886-1906

Personal details
- Born: 11 July 1854
- Died: 29 June 1942 (aged 87)
- Party: Conservative
- Spouse: Alice Thynne (m. 1883)
- Parent: Michael Shaw-Stewart (father)
- Relatives: Michael Shaw-Stewart (grandfather); Richard Grosvenor (grandfather)
- Education: Christ Church, Oxford
- Military career
- Allegiance: United Kingdom
- Rank: Captain
- Units: 4th Battalion (Princess Louise's); Argyll and Sutherland Highlanders

Sir Michael Hugh Shaw-Stewart, 8th Bt (1978) painted by James Torrance, McLean Museum and Art Gallery

Sir Michael Hugh Shaw-Stewart, 8th Baronet KCB TD DL JP (11 July 1854 – 29 June 1942) was a Scottish politician, soldier and landowner.

== Biography ==
He was the eldest son of Sir Michael Shaw-Stewart, 7th Baronet, and Lady Octavia Grosvenor, daughter of Richard Grosvenor, 2nd Marquess of Westminster. He was educated at Eton and Christ Church, Oxford. He was a Captain in the 4th Battalion (Princess Louise's), the Argyll and Sutherland Highlanders and Honorary Colonel of the 5/6th Argyll and Sutherland Highlanders.

He was unsuccessful Conservative parliamentary candidate for Stirlingshire in 1885, and was elected for East Renfrewshire in 1886, holding the seat until 1906.

In 1903, he succeeded his father in the baronetcy and as Laird of Ardgowan. He was awarded the CB in the 1916 Birthday Honours and knighted in the same order in the 1933 Birthday Honours. He was Lord Lieutenant of Renfrewshire from 1922 until his death and was also chairman of the county council.

== Personal life ==
In 1883, he married Lady Alice Emma Thynne CBE JP, daughter of John Thynne, 4th Marquess of Bath. There were no surviving children of the marriage. He died in a nursing home in Glasgow, aged 87. He was succeeded by his nephew, Col. Sir Walter Guy Shaw-Stewart, 9th Baronet MC.

== See also ==
- Shaw Stewart baronets

Parliament of the United Kingdom
Preceded by James Finlayson	Member of Parliament for East Renfrewshire; 1886–1906	Succeeded by Robert Laidlaw
Honorary titles
Preceded by Thomas Glen Glen-Coats	Lord Lieutenant of Renfrewshire; 1922–1942	Succeeded by Alexander Archibald Hagart-Speirs
Baronetage of Nova Scotia
Preceded by Michael Shaw-Stewart	Baronet (of Greenock and Blackhall); 1903–1942	Succeeded by Walter Shaw-Stewart
