= Thomas Irwin (trade unionist) =

Scottish trade unionist and politician (died 1941)

Thomas Irwin (died 4 October 1941) was a Scottish trade unionist and politician, who played a prominent role in the split of the Independent Labour Party from the Labour Party.

== Life and career ==
Living in Dumbarton, Irwin worked as a boilermaker, and became active in the United Society of Boilermakers. He also joined the Independent Labour Party (ILP), which was affiliated to the Labour Party. He was elected to Dumbarton Town Council, and became a bailie. In addition, he was involved in the National Union of Unemployed Workers, serving as its treasurer.

Irwin was selected by the Boilermakers as a prospective Parliamentary candidate, and at the 1929 United Kingdom general election, he stood in Montrose Burghs. He took 44.5% of the votes cast, and a strong second place. As a result of this, he was selected to stand in the 1930 East Renfrewshire by-election by the local Labour Party and Trades Council. However, the national Labour Party learned that he had signed an ILP document, pledging to vote against Labour Party policy in certain matters. After lengthy deliberation, it refused to approve his candidacy, making Irwin the first independent ILP candidate in many years. He took 33.3% of the vote and a distant second place, which both parties considered a disappointing result.

Irwin's candidacy marked a new stage in the split of the ILP from the Labour Party, which was finalised in 1932. However, Irwin chose to remain with the Labour Party, standing for it in Greenock at both the 1931 and 1935 United Kingdom general elections. He took second place on each occasion, although his vote share increased from 30.7% to 44.0%. This proved to be his last contest, and he died at a hospital in Glasgow, on 4 October 1941.
