= Robert Nichol (British politician) =

Robert Nichol (12 February 1890 – 16 April 1925) was a Scottish Labour Party politician. He was educated at Shawlands Academy, Glasgow.

He was first elected at the 1922 general election as the Member of Parliament (MP) for Renfrewshire East. He was re-elected in 1923, and held the seat until his defeat at the 1924 general election by the Unionist candidate, Alexander Munro MacRobert. It would be another 74 years before the constituents would elect a Labour MP again, when future Leader of the Scottish Labour Party, Jim Murphy was elected in 1997.

Parliament of the United Kingdom
Preceded by Joseph Johnstone	Member of Parliament for East Renfrewshire; 1922–1924	Succeeded by Alexander Munro MacRobert
