= 1930 East Renfrewshire by-election =

UK parliamentary by-election

The 1930 East Renfrewshire by-election was a parliamentary by-election held on 28 November 1930 for the British House of Commons constituency of East Renfrewshire in Scotland.

== Previous MP ==
The seat had become vacant when the constituency's Unionist Member of Parliament (MP), Alexander Munro MacRobert, had died on 18 October 1930, aged 57. He had been East Renfrewshire's MP since winning the seat from Labour at the 1924 general election.

== Candidates ==
The Unionist candidate was The Marquess of Clydesdale, eldest son of the 13th Duke of Hamilton.

The Independent Labour Party candidate was Thomas Irwin, and Oliver Brown stood for the National Party of Scotland.

The Liberal Party did not field a candidate; it had last contested the seat in 1923, finishing a poor third.

== Result ==
On a slightly-reduced turnout, the result was a victory for The Marquess of Clydesdale, who won 54% of the votes. He was re-elected at the next two general elections, remaining East Renfrewshire's MP until he succeeded to the Dukedom in 1940, triggering another by-election.

East Renfrewshire by-election, 28 November 1930
Party	Candidate	Votes	%	±%
Unionist	Douglas Douglas-Hamilton	19,753	53.6	+1.4
Ind. Labour Party	Thomas Irwin	12,293	33.3	N/A
National (Scotland)	Oliver Brown	4,818	13.1	New
Majority		7,460	20.3	+15.9
Turnout		36,864	69.0	−8.8
Unionist hold		Swing		

== Previous result ==
General election, 1929: East Renfrewshire
Party	Candidate	Votes	%	±%
Unionist	Alexander Munro MacRobert	18,487	52.2	+0.2
Labour	J. M. Munro	16,924	47.8	−0.2
Majority		13,646	4.4	+0.4
Turnout		35,411	77.8	+2.6
Unionist hold		Swing		

== See also ==
- East Renfrewshire constituency
- East Renfrewshire
- 1926 East Renfrewshire by-election
- 1940 East Renfrewshire by-election
- List of United Kingdom by-elections (1918–1931)
