= Paul Masterton =

Scottish politician

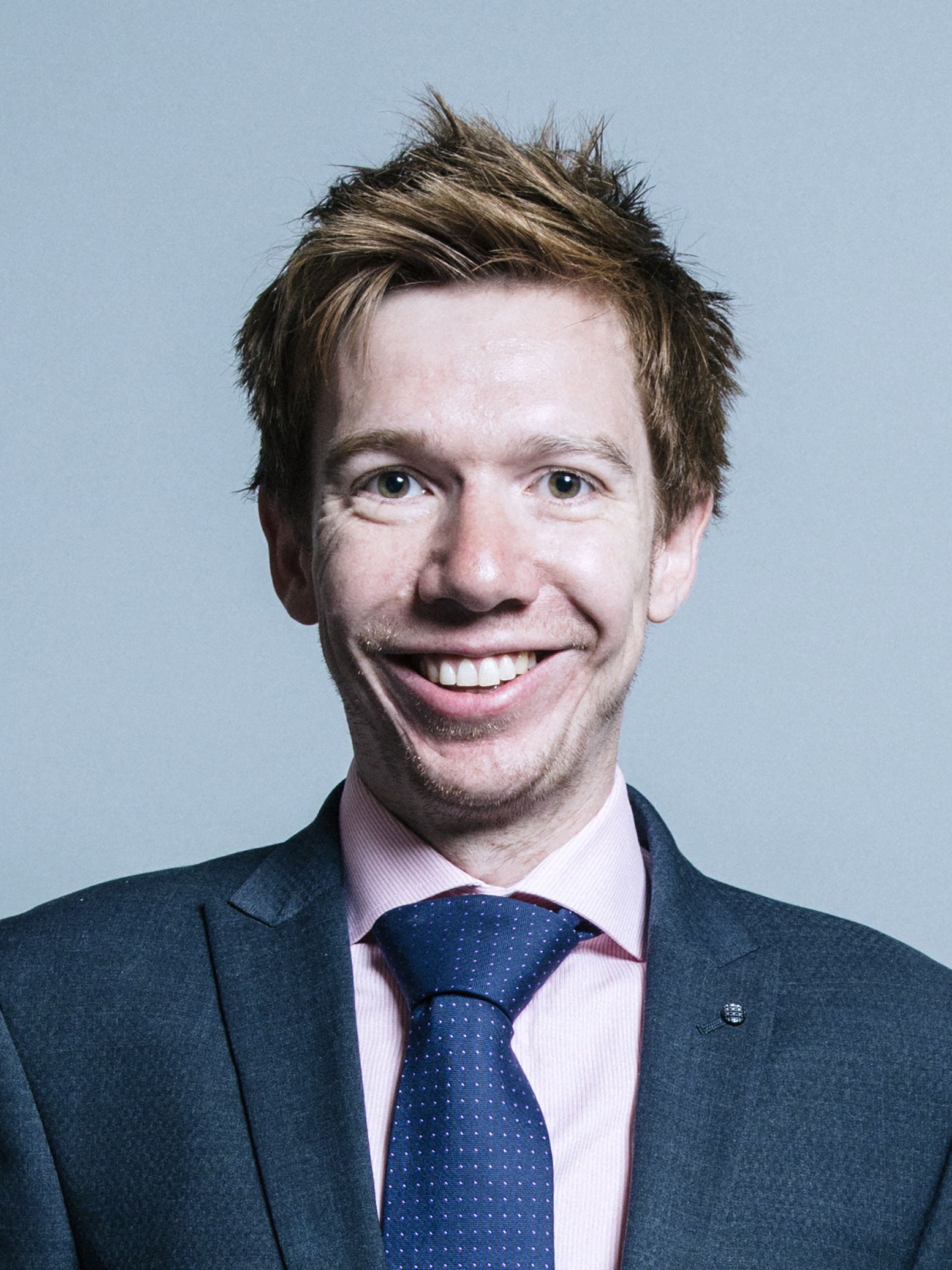
- Official portrait, 2017

Member of Parliament for East Renfrewshire
- In office 8 June 2017 – 6 November 2019
- Preceded by: Kirsten Oswald
- Succeeded by: Kirsten Oswald

Personal details
- Born: 2 November 1985 (age 40) Edinburgh, Scotland
- Party: Formerly Conservative
- Education: University of Dundee
- Profession: Solicitor
- Website: www.paulmasterton.org.uk

Paul Masterton (born 2 November 1985) is a Scottish Conservative Party politician. He was the Member of Parliament (MP) for East Renfrewshire from 2017 to 2019.

== Early life ==
Masterton was born on 2 November 1985 in Edinburgh. He attended Buckstone Primary School and George Watson's College. He went on to graduate with a law degree from the University of Dundee in 2007.

== Career ==
After completing his Diploma in Legal Practice in 2008, Masterton obtained a traineeship with the law firm McGrigors, working in their Glasgow and Belfast offices. In 2010, Masterton became a newly qualified solicitor specialising in Pensions and long-term savings, continuing to work with McGrigors, latterly Pinsent Masons, for 9 years, until his election.

== Parliament ==
Before entering the House of Commons, Masterton first stood in the 2016 Scottish Parliament election as the Scottish Conservative Party candidate for Paisley. He was unsuccessful, receiving 3,533 votes.

In the 2017 general election, Masterton was the Scottish Conservative Party candidate for East Renfrewshire. Masterton received 21,496 votes, defeating the SNP's Kirsten Oswald by 4,712 votes.

In Parliament, Masterton was the Co-chair of the All Party Parliamentary Groups on British Jews and Surgical Mesh, and Chair of the All Party Parliamentary Group on Democratic Participation. He was an active member of a number of other APPGs including those on Surrogacy, Pensions, Equitable Life, Post Offices and Single Parents.

Between September 2018 and March 2019, Masterton served as the Parliamentary Private Secretary to the Ministerial Team at the Home Office. Masterton resigned from this role on 13 March 2019 in order to vote against the Government and oppose the United Kingdom leaving the European Union without a deal on 31 March 2019.

As a former pensions solicitor, Masterton was vocal campaigner on pension issues. In October 2018, he brought a 10 Minute Rule Bill to introduce a new form of pension scheme into the UK, known as Defined Collective Contribution. This followed the agreement between Royal Mail and the Communication Workers Union to establish such a scheme for Royal Mail workers in replacement of their final salary scheme. The Bill was adopted as Government policy and a consultation into Collective Defined Contribution Schemes was launched by the DWP in November 2018.

In April 2019, Masterton led a debate highlighting the impact of the tapered annual allowance on senior clinical staff who were members of the NHS Pension Fund. Masterton worked closely with the BMA and NHS Employers, successfully lobbying the Department for Health and Social Care, and the Treasury, to make changes to the Scheme and launch a review into the operation of the annual allowance taper.

On 12 December 2018, during Prime Minister's Questions, Masterton raised the death of a 13-year-old constituent who committed suicide as a result of cyberbullying. Masterton continued to campaign on the issues of self-harm and suicide prevention in young people, and successfully campaigned for the inclusion of a statutory duty of care on technology companies in the Government's Online Harms White Paper.

Masterton voted Remain in the 2016 EU Referendum and was a vocal supporter of securing a withdrawal agreement from the European Union. In November 2017, Masterton was listed by The Daily Telegraph as one of fifteen Tory "Brexit mutineers", within a week he had received an anonymous Christmas card describing him as a "traitor".

In line with his party's position, Masterton was opposed to a second Scottish independence referendum.

For the 2019 general election, Masterton stood again for the East Renfrewshire seat but was defeated by Kirsten Oswald who was re-elected as the SNP candidate with a majority of 5,426 votes (9.8%) – larger than her previous majority in 2015.

Masterton is no longer a member of the Scottish Conservative Party, and now works as a civil servant at the Ministry of Defence.

== Personal life ==
Masterton has two children.

Parliament of the United Kingdom
Preceded by Kirsten Oswald	Member of Parliament for East Renfrewshire; 2017–2019	Succeeded by Kirsten Oswald
