= Allan Stewart (politician) =

Scottish Conservative politician

John Allan Stewart (1 June 1942 – 7 December 2016) was a Scottish Conservative politician and Scottish Office minister.

== Early life ==
Stewart was born on 1 June 1942 in North Fife. He attended Bell Baxter High School in Cupar. He then studied at St. Andrews University and Harvard University, where he obtained a first class degree.

== Career ==
He was a lecturer in Political Economy at St. Andrews before standing unsuccessfully for the Dundee East constituency in 1970. He was briefly a councillor in the London Borough of Bromley in the mid-1970s. In the 1970s, he also acted as the Secretary of the Confederation of British Industry.

He was elected MP for East Renfrewshire in 1979. His maiden speech as an MP was in support of a motion to repeal the Scotland Act 1978, which would have established a new devolved Scottish Assembly. He served on the Scottish Affairs Select Committee for 2 years. He continued as MP for the East Renfrewshire area in its successor Eastwood from 1983 until 1997. He served two periods as Under-Secretary of State for Scotland at the Scottish Office from 1981 to 1986, and from 1990 to 1995. He was responsible initially for health, home affairs and environment at the Scottish Office. After 1983, he was responsible for industry and education at the Scottish Office until he left the position in 1986. One of his final acts, while responsible for education in Scotland, was to order the phased closure of Leith Nautical College in 1986.

From 1990, he assumed responsibility for the community charge at the Scottish Office. He was described politically as an advocate of Free market ideas and a supporter of Thatcherism ideology.

Stewart was forced to resign his ministerial post after an incident in February 1995, when he brandished a pickaxe at demonstrators who were protesting at the construction of the M77 motorway. He was subsequently fined £200 by the Paisley Sheriff Court for breach of the peace and was forced to give up his position in the Scottish Office.

In March 1997, Stewart was hospitalised, in Dykebar Hospital, Paisley, after suffering a nervous breakdown and due to accusations about his personal life. He stood down, not seeking re-election to Parliament in the general election held on 1 May that year, and subsequently retired altogether from politics. Stewart died in December 2016 at the age of 74.

== Personal life ==
Stewart was married to a woman named Susie and they had one son, Jack, and one daughter, Rosa. It was reported that he had an affair with a woman named Catherine Knight, however he remained married to his wife until his death. It was reported late in his career that he had a serious problem with alcohol and participated in the Alcoholics Anonymous program. He was an active member of the British Hedgehog Preservation Society.

Parliament of the United Kingdom
Preceded by Betty Harvie Anderson	Member of Parliament for East Renfrewshire; 1979–1983	constituency abolished
New constituency	Member of Parliament for Eastwood; 1983–1997	Succeeded by Jim Murphy
