= East Renfrewshire (constituency) =

UK Parliament constituency (1885–1983, 2005 onwards)

- County constituency for the House of Commons
- Interactive map of current boundaries
- Boundary of East Renfrewshire in Scotland
- Subdivision: East Renfrewshire
- Electorate: 72,959 (March 2020)
- Major settlements: Barrhead, Busby, Clarkston, Eaglesham, Giffnock, Neilston, Netherlee, Newton Mearns, Thornliebank, Uplawmoor, Waterfoot

Current constituency
- Created: 2005
- Member of Parliament: Blair McDougall (Labour)
- Seats: One
- Created from: Eastwood

1885–1983
- Seats: One
- Type of constituency: County constituency
- Created from: Renfrewshire
- Replaced by: Eastwood

East Renfrewshire (known as Eastwood from 1983 to 2005) is a constituency of the UK House of Commons, to the south of Glasgow, Scotland. It elects one Member of Parliament (MP) using the first-past-the-post system of voting. It has been represented since 2024 by Blair McDougall of Scottish Labour.

Until 1997, the constituency was the safest Conservative seat in Scotland. At the 1997 general election, which was a landslide victory for Labour, it was won by future Scottish Labour leader Jim Murphy who held the seat until being defeated by Kirsten Oswald of the Scottish National Party at the 2015 general election. In 2017, the constituency returned to Conservative control for the first time in twenty years, when it was won by Conservative candidate Paul Masterton. However, at the 2019 general election, Oswald regained the seat for the SNP once again, and in the 2024 Labour landslide, it again returned to the Labour party.

The constituency has a mostly middle-class electorate and includes affluent areas.

== History ==
The constituency was created by the Redistribution of Seats Act 1885 for the 1885 general election. It was abolished for the 1983 general election, when it was partially replaced by the new Eastwood constituency.

The East Renfrewshire constituency was re-established for the 2005 general election, with the same boundaries as the previous Eastwood constituency. Despite the change of name, it is the only constituency in mainland Scotland whose boundaries were unchanged by the 2005 revision of Scottish constituencies.

== Boundaries and local government areas ==
As created in 1885, the constituency was one of four covering the area of the county of Renfrewshire (except the burgh of Renfrew and the burgh of Port Glasgow, which were components of Kilmarnock Burghs until 1918). The four constituencies were: East Renfrewshire, West Renfrewshire, Paisley and Greenock. Greenock was enlarged and renamed Greenock and Port Glasgow in 1974.

From 1885, the constituency consisted of the parishes of Eastwood, Cathcart, Mearns and Eaglesham, and part of the parish of Govan.

From 1918, the constituency consisted of "The Upper County District, inclusive of all burghs situated therein, except the burghs of Paisley and Johnstone, together with so much of the burgh of Renfrew as is contained within the parish of Govan in the county of Lanark."

The constituency was abolished for the 1983 general election, eight years after the creation of local government regions and districts in 1975. The new constituency, with revised boundaries, was called Eastwood.

In 1996, the area of the Eastwood constituency became, also, the East Renfrewshire unitary council area.

In 1999, a Scottish Parliament constituency was created with the name and boundaries of the Eastwood Westminster constituency.

In the widespread redistribution of Scottish seats for the 2005 general election, the name of the Eastwood Westminster constituency was changed back to East Renfrewshire.

Under the 2023 review of Westminster constituencies which came into effect for the 2024 general election, the boundaries were once again unchanged, being coterminous with those of East Renfrewshire Council.

== Constituency profile and voting patterns ==
An outer suburban part of the Greater Glasgow conurbation and the rural hinterland to the south-west of the city, East Renfrewshire is predominantly an affluent, middle-class commuter area with a high proportion of owner-occupiers and professionals. East Renfrewshire has the largest Jewish population of any constituency in Scotland, with almost half of Scotland's Jewish population living in the area.

At the 2014 Scottish independence referendum, East Renfrewshire returned a significant majority against Scottish independence; with a voter turnout of 90.4%, 41,690 votes were cast for "No" (63.2%) and 24,287 for "Yes" (36.8%). At the 2016 European Union membership referendum, a substantial majority of votes were cast in favour of the United Kingdom remaining in the European Union in East Renfrewshire, with a turnout of 76.1% there were 39,345 "Remain" votes (74.3%) to 13,596 "Leave" votes (25.7%).

The area was looked on as a safely Conservative seat before Jim Murphy of the Labour Party gained the seat (then known as Eastwood) during their landslide victory in 1997. East Renfrewshire was then subsequently viewed as a relatively safe Labour seat until the SNP gained the seat in their 2015 landslide victory.

In 2017, during what would prove to be their best performance at a general election in Scotland for 34 years, the Conservatives subsequently gained the East Renfrewshire seat at the 2017 snap general election; with Paul Masterton being elected with a majority of 4,712 (8.8%) votes over Kirsten Oswald of the Scottish National Party. However, at the 2019 general election; Oswald regained the seat for the SNP with a majority of 5,426 or 9.8%, establishing the seat as an SNP-Conservative marginal battleground.

In the 2024 Labour landslide, Labour retook the seat from the SNP, along with most other seats in Scotland, with the increase in their vote (31.3%) being both the party's highest in Scotland and the General Election as a whole.

== Members of Parliament ==
| Election | Member | Party |
|---|---|---|
| 1885 | James Finlayson | Liberal |
| 1886 | Hugh Shaw-Stewart | Conservative |
| 1906 | Sir Robert Laidlaw | Liberal |
| Jan 1910 | John Gilmour | Unionist |
| 1918 | Joseph Johnstone | Coalition Liberal |
| Jan 1922 | Joseph Johnstone | National Liberal |
| Nov 1922 | Joseph Johnstone | Liberal |
| 1922 | Robert Nichol | Labour |
| 1924 | Alexander Munro MacRobert | Unionist |
| 1930by-election | Douglas Douglas-Hamilton | Unionist |
| 1940by-election | Guy Lloyd | Unionist |
| 1959 | Betty Harvie Anderson | Unionist/Conservative |
| 1979 | Allan Stewart | Conservative |
| 1983 | constituency abolished: see Eastwood | |
| 2005 | Jim Murphy | Labour |
| 2015 | Kirsten Oswald | SNP |
| 2017 | Paul Masterton | Conservative |
| 2019 | Kirsten Oswald | SNP |
| 2024 | Blair McDougall | Labour |

== Election results ==
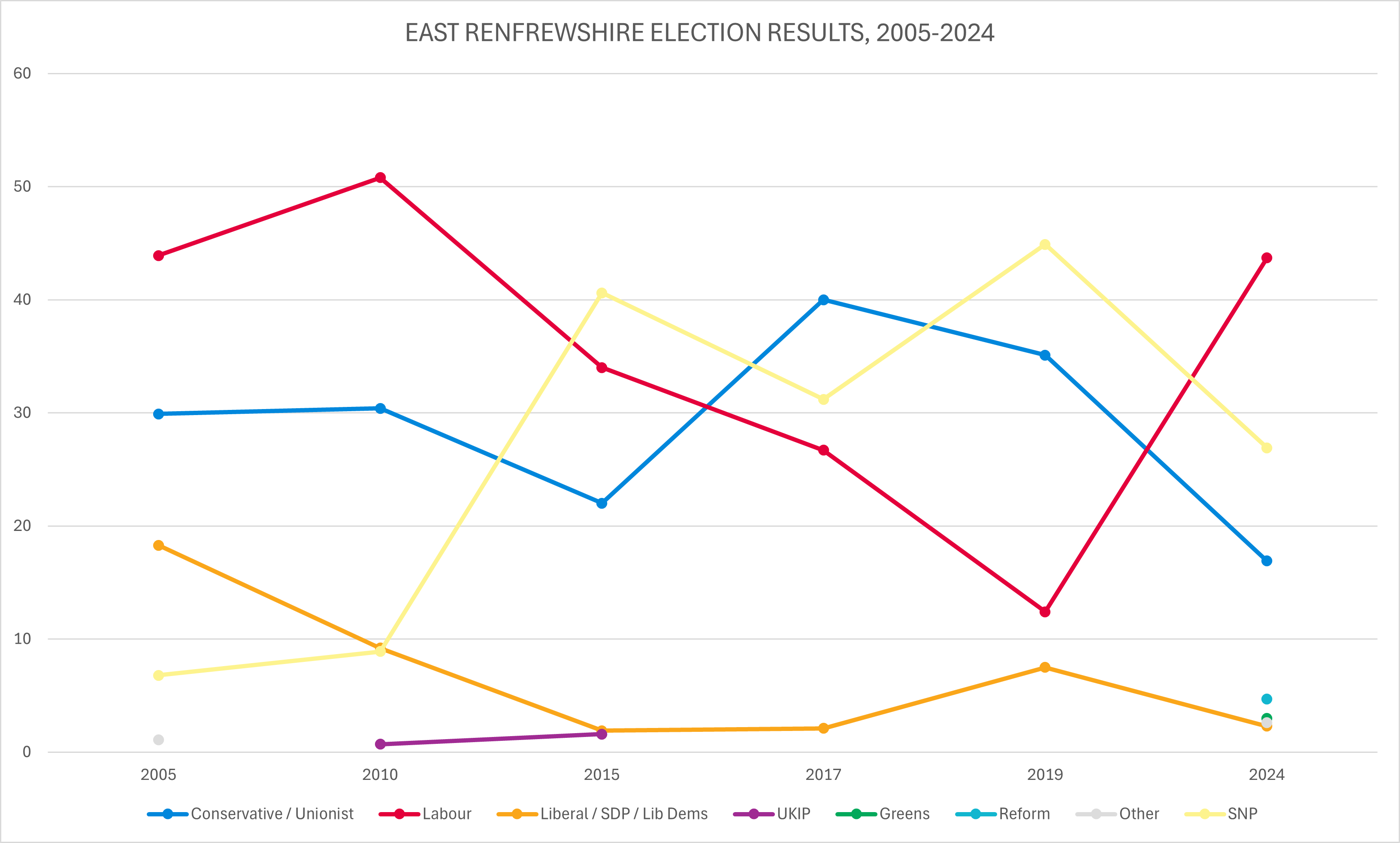
Election results 2005-2024

=== Elections in the 2020s ===
General election 2024: East Renfrewshire
| Party | Candidate | Votes | % | ±% |
|---|---|---|---|---|
| Labour | Blair McDougall | 21,935 | 43.7 | +31.3 |
| SNP | Kirsten Oswald | 13,514 | 26.9 | −18.0 |
| Conservative | Sandesh Gulhane | 8,494 | 16.9 | −18.2 |
| Reform | Matt Alexander | 2,360 | 4.7 | New |
| Green | Karen Sharkey | 1,510 | 3.0 | New |
| Liberal Democrats | Alan Grant | 1,150 | 2.3 | −5.2 |
| Scottish Family | Maria Reid | 487 | 1.0 | New |
| Liberal | Allan Steele | 481 | 1.0 | New |
| ISP | Colette Walker | 296 | 0.6 | New |
| Majority | | 8,421 | 16.8 | N/A |
| Turnout | | 50,227 | 68.4 | −7.5 |
| Registered electors | | 73,380 | | |
| Labour gain from SNP | | Swing | +24.7 | |

=== Elections in the 2010s ===
General election 2019: East Renfrewshire
| Party | Candidate | Votes | % | ±% |
|---|---|---|---|---|
| SNP | Kirsten Oswald | 24,877 | 44.9 | +13.7 |
| Conservative | Paul Masterton | 19,451 | 35.1 | −4.9 |
| Labour | Carolann Davidson | 6,855 | 12.4 | −14.3 |
| Liberal Democrats | Andrew McGlynn | 4,174 | 7.5 | +5.4 |
| Majority | | 5,426 | 9.8 | N/A |
| Turnout | | 55,357 | 76.6 | −0.2 |
| SNP gain from Conservative | | Swing | +9.3 | |

General election 2017: East Renfrewshire
| Party | Candidate | Votes | % | ±% |
|---|---|---|---|---|
| Conservative | Paul Masterton | 21,496 | 40.0 | +18.0 |
| SNP | Kirsten Oswald | 16,784 | 31.2 | −9.4 |
| Labour | Blair McDougall | 14,346 | 26.7 | −7.3 |
| Liberal Democrats | Aileen Morton | 1,112 | 2.1 | +0.2 |
| Majority | | 4,712 | 8.8 | N/A |
| Turnout | | 53,805 | 76.8 | −4.3 |
| Conservative gain from SNP | | Swing | +13.7 | |

General election 2015: East Renfrewshire
| Party | Candidate | Votes | % | ±% |
|---|---|---|---|---|
| SNP | Kirsten Oswald | 23,013 | 40.6 | +31.7 |
| Labour | Jim Murphy | 19,295 | 34.0 | −16.8 |
| Conservative | David Montgomery | 12,465 | 22.0 | −8.4 |
| Liberal Democrats | Graeme Cowie | 1,069 | 1.9 | −7.3 |
| UKIP | Robert Malyn | 888 | 1.6 | +0.9 |
| Majority | | 3,718 | 6.6 | N/A |
| Turnout | | 56,730 | 81.1 | +3.8 |
| SNP gain from Labour | | Swing | +24.3 | |

General election 2010: East Renfrewshire
| Party | Candidate | Votes | % | ±% |
|---|---|---|---|---|
| Labour | Jim Murphy | 25,987 | 50.8 | +6.9 |
| Conservative | Richard Cook | 15,567 | 30.4 | +0.5 |
| Liberal Democrats | Gordon MacDonald | 4,720 | 9.2 | −9.1 |
| SNP | Gordon Archer | 4,535 | 8.9 | +2.1 |
| UKIP | Donald McKay | 372 | 0.7 | New |
| Majority | | 10,420 | 20.4 | +6.4 |
| Turnout | | 51,181 | 77.3 | +5.2 |
| Labour hold | | Swing | +3.2 | |

=== Elections in the 2000s ===
General election 2005: East Renfrewshire
| Party | Candidate | Votes | % | ±% |
|---|---|---|---|---|
| Labour | Jim Murphy | 20,815 | 43.9 | −3.7 |
| Conservative | Richard Cook | 14,158 | 29.9 | +1.1 |
| Liberal Democrats | Gordon MacDonald | 8,659 | 18.3 | +5.4 |
| SNP | Osama Bhutta | 3,245 | 6.8 | −1.7 |
| Scottish Socialist | Ian Henderson | 528 | 1.1 | −0.6 |
| Majority | | 6,657 | 14.0 | −4.9 |
| Turnout | | 47,405 | 72.1 | +1.4 |
| Labour hold | | Swing | −2.4 | |

=== Elections in the 1970s ===
General election 1979: East Renfrewshire
| Party | Candidate | Votes | % | ±% |
|---|---|---|---|---|
| Conservative | Allan Stewart | 25,910 | 49.89 | +8.54 |
| Labour | E Sullivan | 12,672 | 24.40 | +4.57 |
| Liberal | WGA Craig | 9,366 | 18.03 | +3.41 |
| SNP | J Pow | 3,989 | 7.68 | −15.52 |
| Majority | | 13,238 | 25.49 | +7.34 |
| Turnout | | 51,937 | 80.58 | +2.93 |
| Conservative hold | | Swing | | |

General election October 1974: East Renfrewshire
| Party | Candidate | Votes | % | ±% |
|---|---|---|---|---|
| Conservative | Betty Harvie Anderson | 19,847 | 41.35 | |
| SNP | I Jenkins | 11,137 | 23.20 | |
| Labour | CJ Roberts | 9,997 | 20.83 | |
| Liberal | WGA Craig | 7,015 | 14.62 | |
| Majority | | 8,710 | 18.15 | |
| Turnout | | 47,996 | 77.65 | |
| Conservative hold | | Swing | | |

General election February 1974: East Renfrewshire
| Party | Candidate | Votes | % | ±% |
|---|---|---|---|---|
| Conservative | Betty Harvie Anderson | 25,713 | 50.62 | |
| Labour | RS Stewart | 10,227 | 20.13 | |
| Liberal | WGA Craig | 9,588 | 18.88 | |
| SNP | S Watterson | 5,268 | 10.37 | |
| Majority | | 15,486 | 30.49 | |
| Turnout | | 50,796 | 80.66 | |
| Conservative hold | | Swing | | |

General election 1970: East Renfrewshire
| Party | Candidate | Votes | % | ±% |
|---|---|---|---|---|
| Conservative | Betty Harvie Anderson | 29,163 | 52.07 | |
| Labour | Jessie Carnegie | 16,062 | 28.68 | |
| Liberal | Olivia Watt | 7,053 | 12.59 | |
| SNP | John M. Buchanan | 3,733 | 6.66 | New |
| Majority | | 13,101 | 23.39 | |
| Turnout | | 56,011 | 76.16 | |
| Conservative hold | | Swing | | |

=== Elections in the 1960s ===
General election 1966: East Renfrewshire
| Party | Candidate | Votes | % | ±% |
|---|---|---|---|---|
| Conservative | Betty Harvie Anderson | 28,017 | 53.17 | |
| Labour | Robert Lochrie | 17,426 | 33.07 | |
| Liberal | James W McHardy | 7,252 | 13.76 | |
| Majority | | 10,591 | 20.10 | |
| Turnout | | 52,695 | 79.88 | |
| Conservative hold | | Swing | | |

General election 1964: East Renfrewshire
| Party | Candidate | Votes | % | ±% |
|---|---|---|---|---|
| Unionist | Betty Harvie Anderson | 27,846 | 52.54 | |
| Labour | James Gordon | 16,503 | 31.14 | |
| Liberal | Derek M H Starforth | 8,655 | 16.33 | |
| Majority | | 11,343 | 21.40 | |
| Turnout | | 53,004 | 82.63 | |
| Unionist hold | | Swing | | |

=== Elections in the 1950s ===
General election 1959: East Renfrewshire
| Party | Candidate | Votes | % | ±% |
|---|---|---|---|---|
| Unionist | Betty Harvie Anderson | 29,672 | 58.65 | |
| Labour | Arthur J Houston | 14,579 | 28.82 | |
| Liberal | Derek M H Starforth | 6,339 | 12.53 | New |
| Majority | | 15,093 | 29.83 | |
| Turnout | | 50,590 | 82.85 | |
| Unionist hold | | Swing | | |

General election 1955: East Renfrewshire
| Party | Candidate | Votes | % | ±% |
|---|---|---|---|---|
| Unionist | Guy Lloyd | 30,959 | 68.30 | |
| Labour | David J Phillips | 14,371 | 31.70 | |
| Majority | | 16,588 | 36.60 | |
| Turnout | | 45,330 | 78.12 | |
| Unionist hold | | Swing | | |

General election 1951: East Renfrewshire
| Party | Candidate | Votes | % | ±% |
|---|---|---|---|---|
| Unionist | Guy Lloyd | 31,908 | 65.80 | |
| Labour | David J Phillips | 16,588 | 34.20 | |
| Majority | | 15,320 | 31.60 | |
| Turnout | | 48,496 | 81.74 | |
| Unionist hold | | Swing | | |

General election 1950: East Renfrewshire
| Party | Candidate | Votes | % | ±% |
|---|---|---|---|---|
| Unionist | Guy Lloyd | 31,650 | 65.44 | |
| Labour | William L Taylor | 16,716 | 34.56 | |
| Majority | | 14,934 | 30.88 | |
| Turnout | | 48,366 | 78.87 | |
| Unionist hold | | Swing | | |

=== Elections in the 1940s ===
General election 1945: East Renfrewshire
| Party | Candidate | Votes | % | ±% |
|---|---|---|---|---|
| Unionist | Guy Lloyd | 42,310 | 53.6 | −2.0 |
| Labour Co-op | D. McArthur | 36,634 | 46.4 | +12.4 |
| Majority | | 5,676 | 7.2 | −14.4 |
| Turnout | | 78,944 | 67.2 | −8.7 |
| Unionist hold | | Swing | | |

1940 by-election: East Renfrewshire
| Party | Candidate | Votes | % | ±% |
|---|---|---|---|---|
| Unionist | Guy Lloyd | 34,316 | 80.7 | +25.1 |
| Ind. Labour Party | Annie Maxton | 8,206 | 19.3 | N/A |
| Majority | | 26,110 | 61.4 | +39.8 |
| Turnout | | 42,522 | 43.4 | −32.5 |
| Unionist hold | | Swing | | |

=== Elections in the 1930s ===
General election 1935: East Renfrewshire
| Party | Candidate | Votes | % | ±% |
|---|---|---|---|---|
| Unionist | Douglas Douglas-Hamilton | 35,121 | 55.6 | −3.8 |
| Labour Co-op | James Barr | 21,475 | 34.0 | +7.3 |
| SNP | Oliver Brown | 6,593 | 10.4 | −3.5 |
| Majority | | 13,646 | 21.6 | −11.1 |
| Turnout | | 63,189 | 75.9 | −4.8 |
| Unionist hold | | Swing | −6.6 | |

General election 1931: East Renfrewshire
| Party | Candidate | Votes | % | ±% |
|---|---|---|---|---|
| Unionist | Douglas Douglas-Hamilton | 27,740 | 59.38 | |
| Labour Co-op | James Strain | 12,477 | 26.71 | |
| National (Scotland) | Oliver Brown | 6,498 | 13.91 | N/A |
| Majority | | 15,263 | 32.67 | |
| Turnout | | 46,715 | 80.67 | |
| Unionist hold | | Swing | | |

1930 by-election: East Renfrewshire
| Party | Candidate | Votes | % | ±% |
|---|---|---|---|---|
| Unionist | Douglas Douglas-Hamilton | 19,753 | 53.6 | +1.4 |
| Ind. Labour Party | Thomas Irwin | 12,293 | 33.3 | New |
| National (Scotland) | William Brown | 4,818 | 13.1 | New |
| Majority | | 7,460 | 20.3 | +15.9 |
| Turnout | | 36,864 | 69.0 | −8.8 |
| Unionist hold | | Swing | | |

=== Elections in the 1920s ===
General election 1929: East Renfrewshire
| Party | Candidate | Votes | % | ±% |
|---|---|---|---|---|
| Unionist | Alexander Munro MacRobert | 18,487 | 52.2 | −3.5 |
| Labour | John Martin Munro | 16,924 | 47.8 | +3.5 |
| Majority | | 1,563 | 4.4 | −7.0 |
| Turnout | | 35,411 | 77.8 | −5.7 |
| Registered electors | | 45,525 | | |
| Unionist hold | | Swing | −3.7 | |

1926 by-election: East Renfrewshire
| Party | Candidate | Votes | % | ±% |
|---|---|---|---|---|
| Unionist | Alexander Munro MacRobert | 11,817 | 52.0 | −3.7 |
| Labour | John Martin Munro | 10,889 | 48.0 | +3.7 |
| Majority | | 928 | 4.0 | −7.4 |
| Turnout | | 22,706 | 75.2 | −8.3 |
| Registered electors | | 30,211 | | |
| Unionist hold | | Swing | −3.7 | |

Alexander Munro MacRobert was appointed Solicitor General for Scotland on 31 December 1925.

General election 1924: East Renfrewshire
| Party | Candidate | Votes | % | ±% |
|---|---|---|---|---|
| Unionist | Alexander Munro MacRobert | 13,716 | 55.7 | +13.4 |
| Labour | Robert Nichol | 10,903 | 44.3 | −0.3 |
| Majority | | 2,813 | 11.4 | N/A |
| Turnout | | 24,619 | 83.5 | +7.6 |
| Registered electors | | 29,493 | | |
| Unionist gain from Labour | | Swing | +6.9 | |

General election 1923: East Renfrewshire
| Party | Candidate | Votes | % | ±% |
|---|---|---|---|---|
| Labour | Robert Nichol | 9,857 | 44.6 | +2.1 |
| Unionist | Frederick Lobnitz | 9,349 | 42.3 | +2.3 |
| Liberal | William Crawford | 2,887 | 13.1 | −4.4 |
| Majority | | 508 | 2.3 | −0.2 |
| Turnout | | 22,093 | 75.9 | −4.7 |
| Registered electors | | 29,095 | | |
| Labour hold | | Swing | −0.1 | |

General election 1922: East Renfrewshire
| Party | Candidate | Votes | % | ±% |
|---|---|---|---|---|
| Labour | Robert Nichol | 9,708 | 42.5 | +14.7 |
| Unionist | Frederick Lobnitz | 9,158 | 40.0 | New |
| Liberal | Joseph Johnstone | 4,013 | 17.5 | −54.7 |
| Majority | | 550 | 2.5 | N/A |
| Turnout | | 22,879 | 80.6 | +15.9 |
| Registered electors | | 28,394 | | |
| Labour gain from National Liberal | | Swing | +34.7 | |

=== Elections in the 1910s ===
Johnstone

General election 1918: East Renfrewshire
| Party | | Candidate | Votes | % | ±% |
|---|---|---|---|---|---|
| C | National Liberal | Joseph Johnstone | 13,107 | 72.2 | +25.3 |
| | Labour | Robert Spence | 5,048 | 27.8 | New |
| Majority | | | 8,059 | 44.4 | N/A |
| Turnout | | | 18,155 | 64.7 | −24.2 |
| Registered electors | | | 28,066 | | |
| | National Liberal gain from Unionist | | Swing | | |
C indicates candidate endorsed by the coalition government.

General election December 1910: East Renfrewshire
| Party | Candidate | Votes | % | ±% |
|---|---|---|---|---|
| Conservative | John Gilmour | 10,063 | 53.1 | +0.7 |
| Liberal | Ian Macpherson | 8,883 | 46.9 | −0.7 |
| Majority | | 1,180 | 6.2 | +1.4 |
| Turnout | | 18,946 | 88.9 | +1.0 |
| Registered electors | | 21,314 | | |
| Conservative hold | | Swing | +0.7 | |

General election January 1910: East Renfrewshire
| Party | Candidate | Votes | % | ±% |
|---|---|---|---|---|
| Conservative | John Gilmour | 9,645 | 52.4 | +2.7 |
| Liberal | Robert Laidlaw | 8,771 | 47.6 | −2.7 |
| Majority | | 874 | 4.8 | N/A |
| Turnout | | 18,416 | 87.9 | +6.4 |
| Registered electors | | 20,947 | | |
| Conservative gain from Liberal | | Swing | +2.7 | |

=== Elections in the 1900s ===
Laidlaw

General election 1906: East Renfrewshire
| Party | Candidate | Votes | % | ±% |
|---|---|---|---|---|
| Liberal | Robert Laidlaw | 6,896 | 50.3 | New |
| Conservative | Hugh Shaw-Stewart | 6,801 | 49.7 | N/A |
| Majority | | 95 | 0.6 | N/A |
| Turnout | | 13,697 | 81.5 | N/A |
| Registered electors | | 16,797 | | |
| Liberal gain from Conservative | | Swing | N/A | |

General election 1900: East Renfrewshire
| Party | Candidate | Votes | % | ±% |
|---|---|---|---|---|
| Conservative | Hugh Shaw-Stewart | Unopposed | | |
| Conservative hold | | | | |

=== Elections in the 1890s ===
General election 1895: East Renfrewshire
| Party | Candidate | Votes | % | ±% |
|---|---|---|---|---|
| Conservative | Hugh Shaw-Stewart | Unopposed | | |
| Conservative hold | | | | |

General election 1892: East Renfrewshire
| Party | Candidate | Votes | % | ±% |
|---|---|---|---|---|
| Conservative | Hugh Shaw-Stewart | 4,484 | 56.9 | −4.1 |
| Liberal | John Gloag Murdoch | 3,397 | 43.1 | +4.1 |
| Majority | | 1,087 | 13.8 | −8.2 |
| Turnout | | 7,881 | 80.5 | +5.2 |
| Registered electors | | 9,792 | | |
| Conservative hold | | Swing | −4.1 | |

=== Elections in the 1880s ===
General election 1886: East Renfrewshire
| Party | Candidate | Votes | % | ±% |
|---|---|---|---|---|
| Conservative | Hugh Shaw-Stewart | 3,806 | 61.0 | +14.7 |
| Lib-Lab | James Samuelson | 2,438 | 39.0 | −14.7 |
| Majority | | 1,368 | 22.0 | N/A |
| Turnout | | 6,244 | 75.3 | −6.5 |
| Registered electors | | 8,295 | | |
| Conservative gain from Liberal | | Swing | +14.7 | |

General election 1885: East Renfrewshire
| Party | Candidate | Votes | % | ±% |
|---|---|---|---|---|
| Liberal | James Finlayson | 3,642 | 53.7 | |
| Conservative | Allan Gilmour, jun | 3,144 | 46.3 | |
| Majority | | 498 | 7.4 | |
| Turnout | | 6,786 | 81.8 | |
| Registered electors | | 8,295 | | |
| Liberal win (new seat) | | | | |

== See also ==
- 1926 East Renfrewshire by-election
- 1930 East Renfrewshire by-election
- 1940 East Renfrewshire by-election
- Eastwood (UK Parliament constituency) (1983–2005)
