= Oliver Brown (Scottish activist) =

Scottish nationalist political activist

Oliver Brown, circa 1970s

William Oliver Brown (1903 – 28 May 1976) was a Scottish nationalist political activist.

== Early life ==
Born in Paisley, Brown studied Latin and French at the University of Glasgow before teaching French at secondary schools, spending most of his career at Whitehill Secondary School and Pollokshields Secondary School. He contributed to both the English- and French-language editions of the Grand Larousse encyclopédique, and worked both as a courier for the British Council and a broadcaster on the BBC.

He was married to the painter and illustrator Margaret Oliver Brown (1912–1990). They had a daughter, Una Ozga.

== Early political activity ==
Brown was a founding member of the National Party of Scotland in 1929. He stood for the party at the 1930 East Renfrewshire by-election, becoming the first National Party candidate to hold his deposit. He stood again in East Renfrewshire at the 1931 general election, increasing his vote to 6,498. In 1934, the National Party merged into the new Scottish National Party (SNP), and Brown spoke at its first public meeting, alongside Compton Mackenzie. He was selected as a candidate for the new party at the 1935 general election, again in East Renfrewshire. Although he took 6,593 votes, on this occasion, it was just under one-eighth of the total, so he lost his deposit.

By the late 1930s, Brown had left the SNP and joined the Labour Party, serving on the executive of the Labour Council for Scottish Self-Government. He was a pacifist during World War II, and was active with Arthur Donaldson in discouraging young men from joining the Forces. In 1940, he launched the Scots Socialist journal, with Archie Lamont, Douglas Young, George Campbell Hay and Hugh MacDiarmid, acting as its editor until it ceased publication in 1949. Initially, the Scots Socialist was associated with the Scottish Secretariat Study Group, but by 1942, it was published in the name of Brown's own Scottish Socialist Party. In 1943, he affiliated the party to the SNP, but the relationship remained semi-detached, and the Scottish Socialist Party was soon acting independently once more. It remained small, based around speeches he would give from his soapbox on the corner of Sauchiehall Street and Wellington Street in Glasgow, generally with fewer than ten supporters.

In 1945, Brown published Scotlandshire: England's worst governed province. In the introduction, he claimed that he was the best-known Scottish nationalist, with a record of opposing the closure of Scottish factories. At the 1950 general election, Brown stood in Greenock as an "Irish Anti-Partitionist and Scottish Nationalist", backed by the Irish Anti-Partition League, their Greenock branch being the largest in Scotland, with over 800 members. An unusual candidate for the party, given that he was neither Irish nor Catholic, he refused to support the organisation's policy of establishing more Catholic schools in England, and took last place in the poll, with only 718 votes. Following the result, he claimed that "I appealed to the intelligent section of the electorate and the result shows that I have received their unanimous support".

== Later political activity ==
Brown became President of the Scottish National Congress in 1950, this SNP split being led by Roland Muirhead. However, he disapproved of its submission to the Royal Commission on Scottish Affairs and so resigned in 1954. That year, Brown claimed £3000 in damages from the Scottish Daily Mail, after it claimed that he was linked to an unsuccessful effort to blow up a new postbox marked "EIIR", in objection to the regnal number, the new queen being the first Elizabeth to rule in Scotland. He lost the case.

At the 1959 general election, the SNP selected Brown as their Prospective Parliamentary Candidate for Hamilton. However, with the election impending, he decided not to stand, claiming that it would be a waste of time and money. The SNP instead selected David Rollo to fight the seat, but Brown resigned from the party and instead became active in the Labour Party. In 1965, he applied for readmittance to the SNP, but this was rejected by the party's National Executive. He was enthused by the SNP's victory in the 1967 Hamilton by-election, quipping that it "caused a shiver to run along the Scottish Labour benches looking for a spine to run up". That year, he founded the 1320 Club with MacDiarmid, Young, Frederick Boothby and Wendy Wood, serving as its first president. However, the club struggled, Boothby secretly founded a private army, and it ultimately dissolved into Siol nan Gaidheal.

Brown wrote a regular column for the Scots Independent until his death. In 1968, a selection of his writings were published as Witdom, with an introduction by MacDiarmid. In 1983, the Scots Independent launched the Oliver Brown Award in his memory, giving it annually to the public figure judged to have done most to advance Scotland's self-respect.
