= Alexander MacRobert (politician) =

Scottish lawyer and politician (1873–1930)

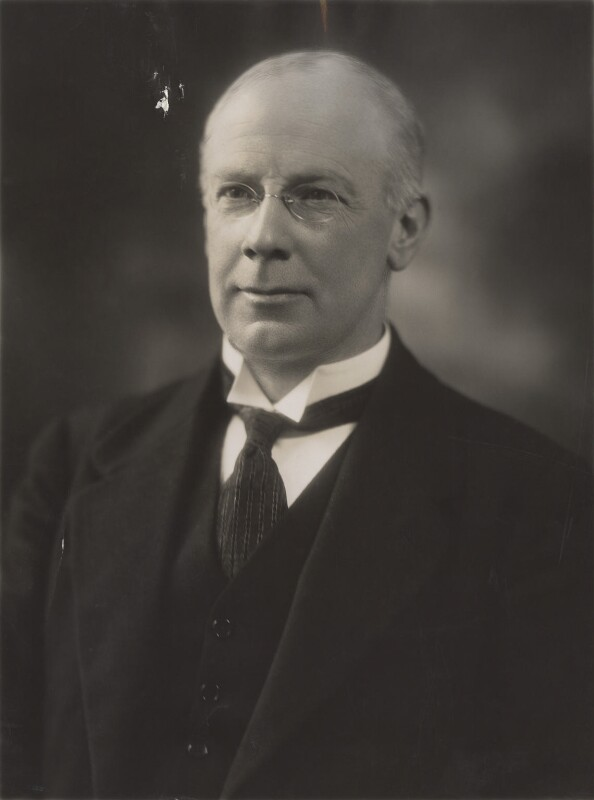
MacRobert in 1925

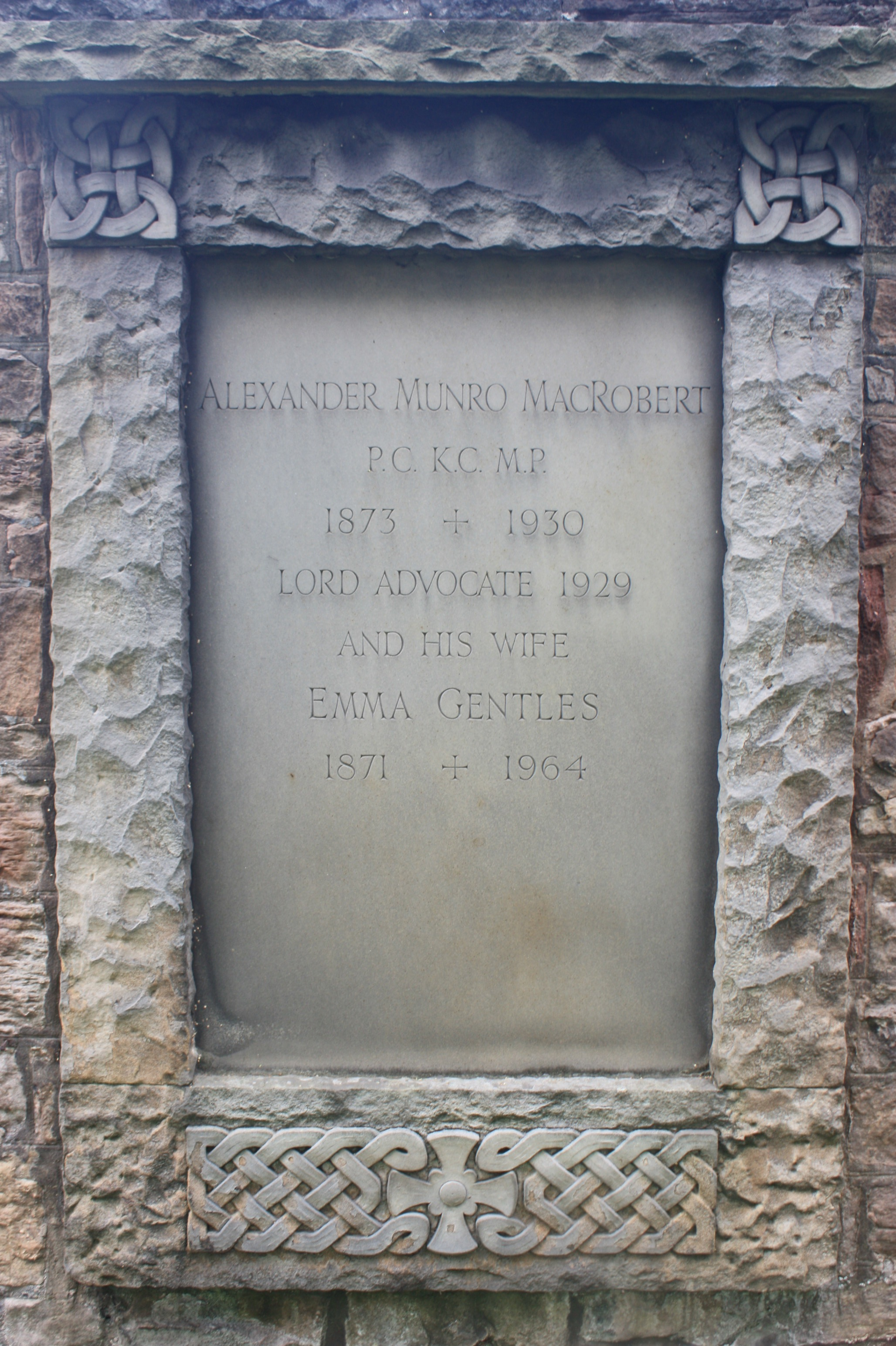
MacRobert's grave in Dean Cemetery

Alexander Munro MacRobert KC (1873 – 18 October 1930) was a Scottish lawyer and Unionist politician. He was Lord Advocate of Scotland in 1929.

== Life ==
He was born in 1873 the son of Jean Carmichael and Thomas MacRobert.

He was educated at Paisley Grammar School, going on to study law at the University of Edinburgh and then the University of Glasgow graduating MA in 1895 and LLB in 1897. He became an advocate in 1897. In 1910 he was living at 86 Great King Street in Edinburgh's New Town.

He worked with the Admiralty in 1917–18 and as an Advocate Depute from 1919 to 1923. He was appointed King's Counsel in 1919. He was Sheriff of Forfar from 1923 to 1924.

He was an unsuccessful parliamentary candidate for Edinburgh Leith in 1922, and was elected for East Renfrewshire in October 1924 holding the seat until his death. He was appointed Solicitor General for Scotland in December 1925, and was promoted to serve as Lord Advocate briefly from May 1929 to June 1929.

He is buried in a line of law lords against the north wall of the 20th century extension to Dean Cemetery in Edinburgh, with his wife Emma Gentles.

Parliament of the United Kingdom
Preceded by Robert Nichol	Member of Parliament for East Renfrewshire; 1924–1930	Succeeded by The Marquess of Clydesdale
Legal offices
Preceded by David Fleming	Solicitor General for Scotland; 1925–1929	Succeeded by Wilfrid Normand
Preceded by William Watson	Lord Advocate; April–June 1929	Succeeded by Craigie Aitchison
