= 1926 East Renfrewshire by-election =

UK Parliamentary by-election

The 1926 East Renfrewshire by-election was held on 29 January 1926. The by-election was held due to the appointment as Solicitor General for Scotland of the incumbent Conservative MP, Alexander Munro MacRobert. It was won by the Conservative candidate Alexander Munro MacRobert. This was the final ministerial by-election held prior to an amendment to the Re-Election of Ministers Act, which abolished the practice.

East Renfrewshire by-election, 1926: Renfrewshire East
Party	Candidate	Votes	%	±%
Unionist	Alexander Munro MacRobert	11,817	52.0	−3.7
Labour	John Martin Munro	10,889	48.0	+3.7
Majority		928	4.0	−7.4
Turnout		22,706	75.2	−8.3
Registered electors		30,211		
Unionist hold		Swing	−3.7	
