= List of people associated with the campaign for Scottish devolution =

This is a list of people associated with the campaign for Scottish devolution, also referred to as home rule; for example, signatories of the Claim of Right for Scotland.

| Name | Party | Ref |
|---|---|---|
| Irene Adams, Baroness Adams of Craigielea | Labour Party | |
| Elspeth Attwooll | Liberal Democrats | |
| John Bannerman, Baron Bannerman of Kildonan | Scottish Liberal Party | |
| James Barr | Labour Party | |
| John Stuart Blackie | | |
| Colin Boyd, Baron Boyd of Duncansby | Labour Party | |
| Rhona Brankin | Scottish Labour | |
| Jeremy Bray | Labour Party | |
| Gordon Brown | Labour Party | |
| Malcolm Bruce | Liberal Democrats | |
| Menzies Campbell | Liberal Democrats | |
| Dennis Canavan | Non-partisan | |
| Malcolm Chisholm | Scottish Labour | |
| Campbell Christie | | |
| Eric Clarke | Labour Party | |
| Robert Bontine Cunninghame Graham | Scottish National Party | |
| Alistair Darling | Labour Party | |
| Donald Dewar | Scottish Labour | |
| Alec Douglas-Home | Conservative Party | |
| Ruaraidh Erskine | | |
| Harry Ewing, Baron Ewing of Kirkford | Labour Party | |
| Maria Fyfe | Scottish Labour | |
| Andrew Dewar Gibb | Scottish National Party | |
| Charlie Gordon | Scottish Labour | |
| Donald Gorrie | Liberal Democrats | |
| Jo Grimond | Liberal Party/Liberal Democrats | |
| Jimmy Halliday | Scottish National Party | |
| Ian Hamilton | Scottish National Party | |
| Keir Hardie | Labour Party | |
| Edward Heath | Conservative Party | |
| Lesley Hinds | Scottish Labour | |
| Tom Johnston | Labour Party | |
| Johann Lamont | Labour and Co-operative | |
| Magnus Linklater | | |
| Bashir Maan | Labour Party | |
| John MacCormick | Scottish National Party | |
| Neil MacCormick | Scottish National Party | |
| Ramsay MacDonald | National Labour Organisation | |
| John MacDougall | Labour Party | |
| Alexander MacEwen | Scottish National Party | |
| Compton Mackenzie | National Party of Scotland | |
| John Mackintosh | Labour Party | |
| Kate Maclean | Scottish Labour | |
| Malcolm Macleod | | |
| Hector C. Macpherson | | |
| David Martin | Scottish Labour | |
| Allan Massie | Conservative Party | |
| George Mathers, 1st Baron Mathers | Labour Party | |
| James Maxton | Independent Labour Party | |
| John McAllion | Scottish Socialist Party | |
| Tom McCabe | Scottish Labour | |
| Jack McConnell | Scottish Labour | |
| John McGovern | Independent Labour Party | |
| Anne McGuire | Labour Party | |
| Robert McIntyre | Scottish National Party | |
| Rosemary McKenna | Labour Party | |
| Pauline McNeill | Scottish Labour | |
| Ray Michie, Baroness Michie of Gallanach | Liberal Democrats | |
| James Graham, 6th Duke of Montrose | Scottish Party | |
| John Farquhar Munro | Scottish Liberal Democrats | |
| Tom Nairn | | |
| William Power | Scottish National Party | |
| Nora Radcliffe | Scottish Liberal Democrats | |
| James Robertson | | |
| John Robertson | Scottish Labour Party | |
| Alex Salmond | Alba Party | |
| Tavish Scott | Scottish Liberal Democrats | |
| John Sewel, Baron Sewel | Non-affiliated | |
| Norman Shanks | | |
| John Smith | Labour Party | |
| Bill Speirs | Scottish Labour Party | |
| David Steel | Independent | |
| Campbell Stephen | Independent Labour Party | |
| Jamie Stone | Liberal Democrats | |
| Nicola Sturgeon | Scottish National Party | |
| Nigel Tranter | | |
| Gavin Vernon | | |
| Jim Wallace, Baron Wallace of Tankerness | Liberal Democrats | |
| James A. Whyte | | |
| Gordon Wilson | Scottish National Party | |
| William Wolfe | Scottish National Party | |
| Wendy Wood | | |
| Kenyon Wright | Scottish Liberal Democrats | |

== See also ==
- Scottish Home Rule Association
- Scottish Labour Party (1888)
- Scottish Covenant Association
- Campaign for a Scottish Assembly
- Scottish Constitutional Convention
- Scottish Labour Action
- Scotland United
- Scotland Forward
