= Stone of Destiny (2008 film) =

- Theatrical release poster
- Directed by: Charles Martin Smith
- Written by: Charles Martin Smith
- Produced by: Andrew Boswell; Rob Merilees
- Starring: Charlie Cox; Billy Boyd; Robert Carlyle; Kate Mara; Bryan Lowe; Brenda Fricker
- Cinematography: Glen Winter
- Edited by: Fredrik Thorsen
- Production companies: Infinity Features Entertainment; The Mob Film Company
- Distributed by: Alliance Films (Canada); Odeon Sky Filmworks (United Kingdom)
- Release dates: 28 June 2008 (Edinburgh International Film Festival); 10 October 2008
- Running time: 96 minutes
- Countries: United Kingdom; Canada
- Language: English
- Budget: £6 million

Stone of Destiny is a 2008 Scottish-Canadian historical adventure comedy film written and directed by Charles Martin Smith and starring Charlie Cox, Billy Boyd, Robert Carlyle, and Kate Mara. Based on real events, the film tells the story of the removal of the Stone of Scone from Westminster Abbey. The stone, supposedly the Stone of Jacob over which Scottish monarchs were traditionally crowned at Scone in Perthshire, was taken by King Edward I of England in 1296 and placed under the throne at Westminster Abbey in London. In 1950, a group of Scottish nationalist students succeeded in liberating it from Westminster Abbey and returning it to Scotland where it was placed symbolically at Arbroath Abbey, the site of the signing of the Declaration of Arbroath and an important site in the Scottish nationalist cause.

Filming began in June 2007 in various locations throughout Scotland, Wales and England. The filmmakers were given rare access to shoot scenes inside Westminster Abbey. The film was premiered at the Edinburgh International Film Festival in Fountainbridge, Edinburgh, Scotland on 21 June 2008. The film closed the 33rd Annual Toronto International Film Festival on 13 September 2008; and was presented at The Hampton's International Film Festival in the United States. The film was released in the United Kingdom on 10 October 2008 and in Canada on 20 February 2009.

== Plot ==
In 1950 Ian Hamilton (Charlie Cox), an ardent member of the Scottish nationalist organisation, the Scottish Covenant Association, hopes to eventually see an independent Scotland. Frustrated and saddened by the complacency of his fellow Scots who seem to accept the status quo, he looks forward to a time when Scotland is free to decide its own future. After a petition to Parliament for the establishment of Scottish home rule is rejected, Hamilton decides to perform a symbolic act to bring national focus into the movement. With his friend, Bill Craig (Billy Boyd), he plots a scheme to bring the Stone of Destiny back to Scotland from Westminster Abbey in London, where it has resided for centuries after it was taken by King Edward I of England as a spoil of war in the Middle Ages.

Hamilton and Craig research the floor plans and security setup of Westminster Abbey and plan the theft, but once Craig realises the legal implications of removing the stone and the potential impact to his personal life and career, he backs out. Undaunted, Hamilton decides to remove the stone by himself. He turns to John MacCormick (Robert Carlyle), a prominent campaigner for Scottish devolution, and asks for financial help with the project. Although he initially refuses to take seriously Hamilton's proposal and request for a mere £50, MacCormick reconsiders and provides his support. Later at a party, MacCormick refers him to Kay Matheson (Kate Mara), a young woman with strong nationalist ideas, to help him retrieve the stone.

After meeting Matheson, Hamilton is soon introduced to Gavin Vernon (Stephen McCole), a strong young man (another student) known mainly for his drinking ability. On the day of their departure for London, Vernon unexpectedly brings his quiet friend Alan Stuart (Ciaron Kelly) along with him. At first Hamilton opposes bringing in a fourth member, but Vernon convinces him that Stuart and his car will be valuable assets to the group. They agree to steal the stone on Christmas Eve while all of London is distracted by the holiday celebration.

The four nationalist students arrive in London the day before Christmas Eve and decide to steal the stone that very night, instead of their original plan of the following night. They drive to Westminster Abbey, but their plans are interrupted when Hamilton is discovered by a watchman, who mistakes him for a homeless man and lets him go. Soon after, Matheson falls ill from a fever and Hamilton brings her to a bed & breakfast inn to recover. The landlady is suspicious of their Scottish accents and shifty behaviour, and when Hamilton comes for Matheson at 2:00 A.M., she phones the police, who likewise suspect the young Scots of being up to something, but they manage to avoid being arrested.

That night, while Matheson waits in the car, Hamilton, Vernon, and Stuart break into Westminster Abbey and steal the Stone of Scone, which breaks in two pieces in the process. Seeing that the crack was made long ago and merely patched over, the group drive to the Scottish border and hide the larger piece in a field. After returning to Glasgow and witnessing the widespread nationalist celebration over the theft of the stone, the group learn that the stone could be permanently damaged if left to the elements. They return to the field and retrieve the stone with the aid of a group of Romani people who are camped in the field.

After the two parts of the stone are reattached, the students offer to return it to the authorities at the symbolically significant Arbroath Abbey, the site of the signing of the Declaration of Arbroath. The police arrive and arrest the students, who are charged, but never prosecuted. (Note: Ian Hamilton went on to become one of Scotland's leading QCs. He wrote about his exploits in a book called A Touch Of Treason and had a cameo role in the film, portraying a businessman. Kay Matheson was a domestic science teacher at the time of the plot. The Gaelic scholar went back to teaching after the heist on Westminster Abbey and was living in a nursing home in Wester Ross in 2007. She died in 2013. Gavin Vernon, the engineering expert, emigrated to Canada in the 1960s and later joked he "never had to buy a beer again" after news of his deeds emerged in his adopted homeland. He died in 2004 at the age of 77. Alan Stuart, the quiet member of the group, has never publicly spoken of his role that night. His whereabouts remained a mystery for many years. Stuart died on 12 March 2019.) The Stone of Scone was returned to London, where it remained until 1996, when it was moved to Edinburgh Castle "on loan" with the understanding that it would be brought back to Westminster Abbey for the next coronation.

== Cast ==
- Charlie Cox as Ian Hamilton
- Kate Mara as Kay Matheson
- Robert Carlyle as John MacCormick
- Billy Boyd as Bill Craig
- Stephen McCole as Gavin Vernon
- Ciaron Kelly as Alan Stuart
- Peter Mullan as Harris Hamilton, Ian's father
- Brenda Fricker as Mrs. McQuarry
- Juliet Cadzow as Ian's mother
- Alex Donald as London Policeman
- John Comerford as Pub Landlord
- Richard Addison as Tour Guide
- Danielle Stewart as Brochure Girl
- Suzanne Dance as Church Woman
- Pauline King as Jen
- Bryan Lowe as Student in Pub
- Margaret Newlands as B&B Owner
- Ron Donachie as Night Watchman
- Rab Affleck as Gypsy
- Stewart Porter as Veteran in Pub
- Bernard Horsfall as Archdeacon
- Stephen Clyde as Abbey Constable
- Johnny Meres as Detective
- Stewart Cairns as Reporter
- Ian Hamilton as English Businessman (cameo)

== Production ==
Filming locations

- Arbroath, Angus, Scotland
- Bridgend, Wales, UK
- University of Glasgow, Glasgow, Strathclyde, Scotland
- Glasgow, Strathclyde, Scotland
- Glenfinnan Viaduct, Fort William, Highland, Scotland
- London, England, UK
- Oakshaw Street East, Paisley, Renfrewshire, Scotland
- Paisley Abbey, Paisley, Renfrewshire, Scotland
- Vancouver, British Columbia, Canada
- Westminster Abbey, London, England, UK

== Reception ==
=== Critical response ===
Stone of Destiny received mixed reviews. From Canadian Film: "A heartwarming triumph for the human spirit. For the non-English, a powerful tale of courage, pride, and the innocence of youth." From Variety: "This unabashedly sentimental and outright anti-English pic is stodgy as a cheap haggis with nationalistic sentimentality." From The Guardian: "A wee-dram-and-bagpipes invitation to a mythical Scotland of yesteryear." From Screen International: "an old-fashioned, unashamed heartwarmer." Rich Cline from Shadows on the Wall calls it "a rousing caper adventure [that] can't help but keep audiences engaged". The movie won 3 awards and was nominated for 6.

=== Box office ===
The film took in just £140,000 in the three weeks subsequent to its release in the UK. It was never shown outside of the UK, Norway and New Zealand.
