= Coronation Stone, Kingston upon Thames =

Stone in Kingston, United Kingdom

Coordinates: 51.4084°N 0.3068°W

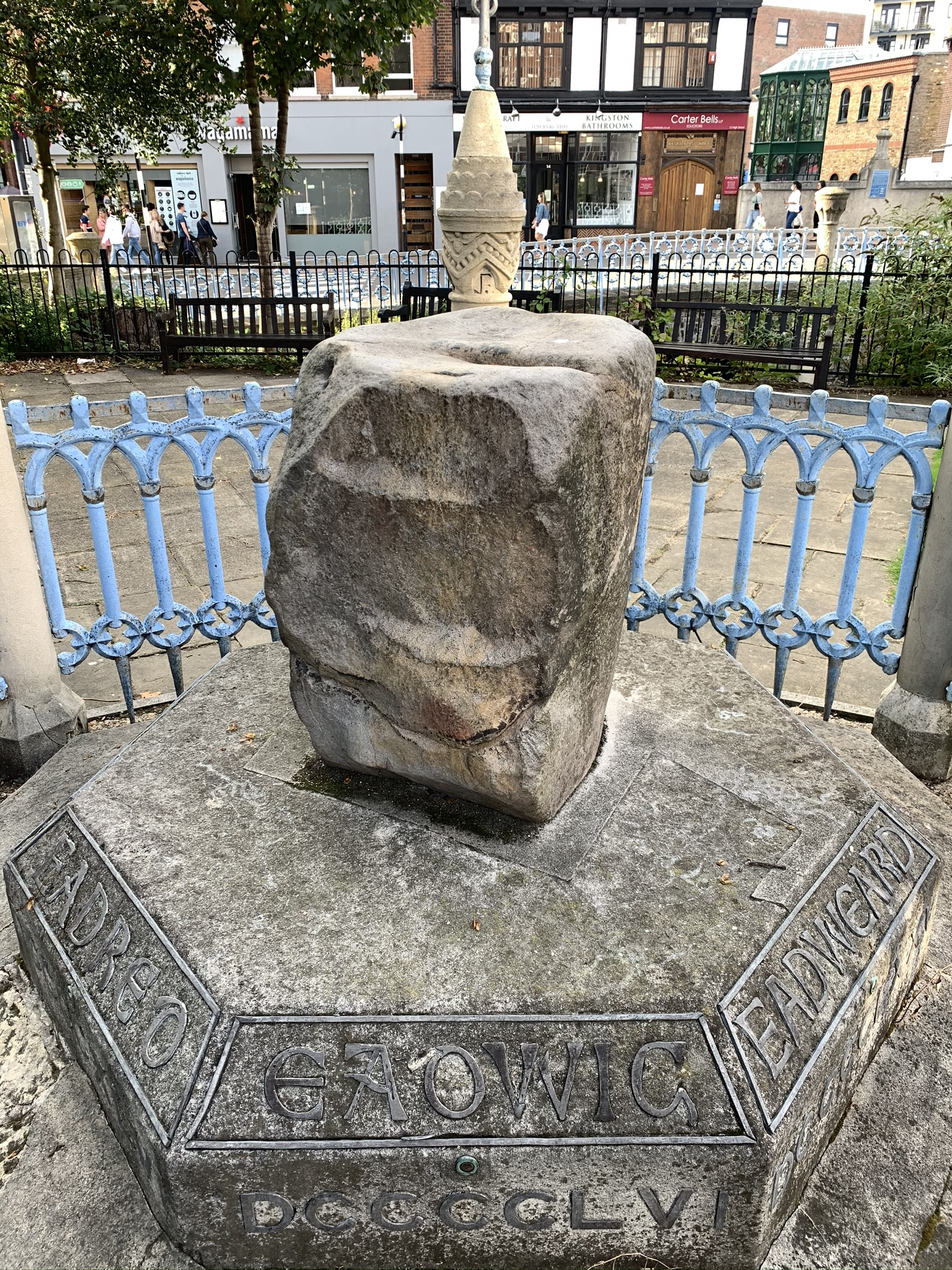
The Coronation Stone

The Coronation Stone is an ancient sarsen stone block which is believed to have been the site of the coronation of seven Anglo-Saxon kings. It is currently located next to the Guildhall in Kingston upon Thames, England, and is a Grade I listed building. Kingston is now a town in the Royal Borough of Kingston upon Thames in Greater London.

== Toponymy ==
In Old English, tun, ton or don meant farmstead or settlement, so the name Kingston appears to mean farmstead of the kings. A local legend that these Saxon coronations gave Kingston its name is contradicted by the records of the 838 council.

== History ==
Æthelstan was consecrated king at Kingston in 925, Eadred in 946 and Æthelred the Unready in 979. There is also some evidence that Edward the Elder, Edmund I, Eadwig and Edward the Martyr were consecrated in the town.

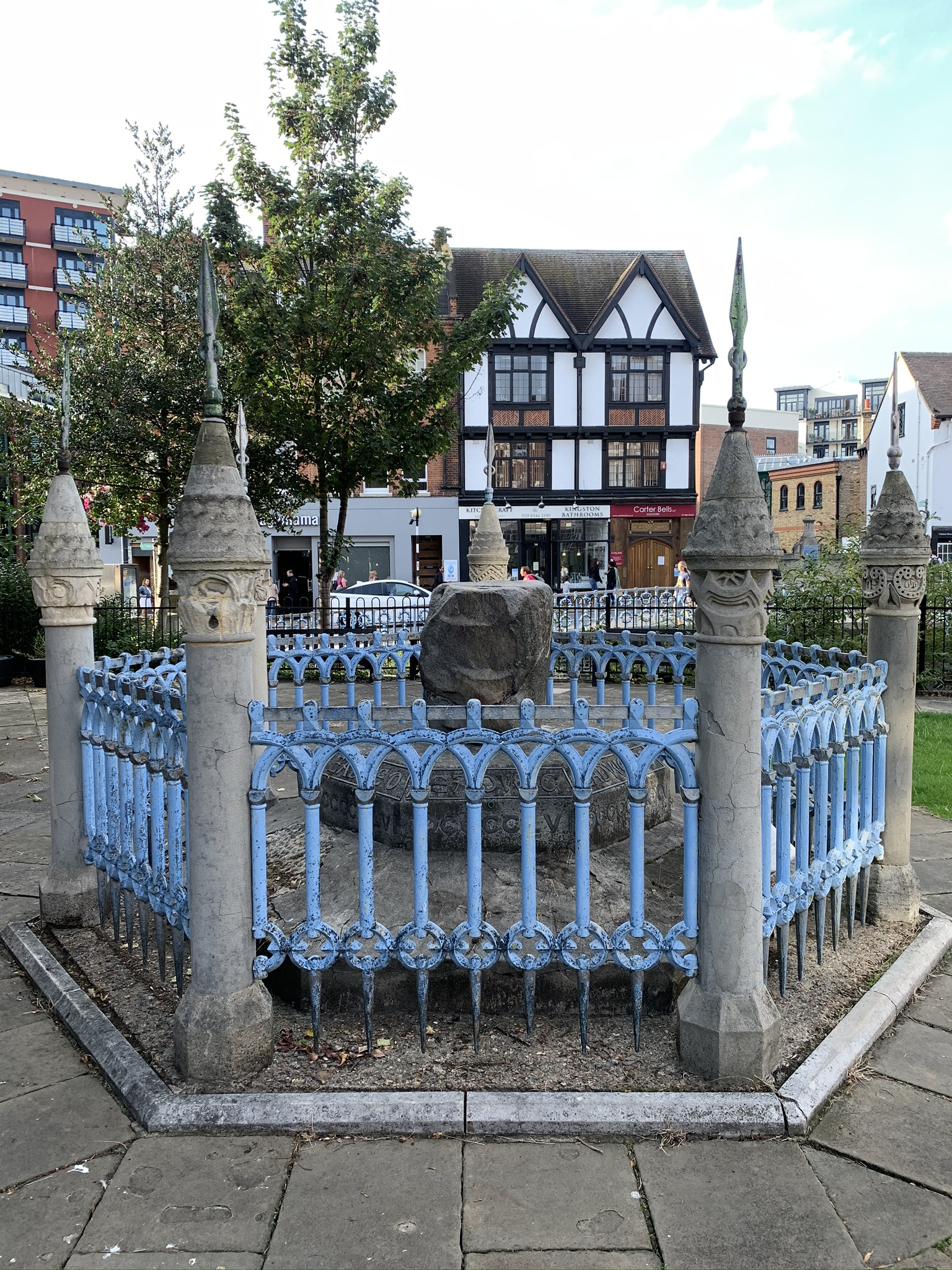
The stone is protected by low railings

According to John Stow, writing in the late sixteenth century, Æthelstan was crowned on a stage in the market place, but it was later believed that the kings were crowned in the ancient church of St Mary, which collapsed in 1730. A large stone block was recovered soon afterwards from the ruins of the chapel, and it has since been regarded as the "Coronation Stone" of the Kings of the English. It was used for a time in the late 18th century to the early 19th century as a mounting block, but in 1850 it was placed in the market place on a plinth in front of the old Town Hall (on the site now occupied by the 'Market House' today), which had the names of the seven kings believed to have been crowned on it inscribed around the side.

== Future plans ==
In 2017, Kingston Council was considering an option of re-siting the coronation stone from the Guildhall's frontage back to its original location within the churchyard of Kingston's old parish church, All Saints' Church. Planning permission had been granted in 2010, although as of 2026 the stone remains in front of the Guildhall.

== See also ==
- List of individual rocks – Named rocks (not types of rock)
- Blarney Stone – Limestone block in Blarney Castle (Ireland)
- Stone of Scone – Ancient Scottish coronation artefact (Scotland)
- Duke's Chair – Stone chair in Austria (Austria)
- Edward Faraday Odlum – Canadian geologist
- History of Scotland
- Lia Fáil – Standing stone on the Hill of Tara, Ireland (Ireland)
- Omphalos – Religious stone artefact
- Prince's Stone – Ceremonial notion used in medieval Austria and Slovenia (Slovenia)
- Stone of Jacob – Stone mentioned in the Bible
- Stones of Mora – Historic location in Knivsta, Sweden (Sweden)
