= 1950 removal of the Stone of Scone =

1950 heist by Scottish nationalists

On 25 December 1950, four Scottish students from the University of Glasgow (Ian Hamilton, Gavin Vernon, Kay Matheson and Alan Stuart) removed the Stone of Scone from Westminster Abbey in London and took it back to Scotland. The students were members of the Scottish Covenant Association, a group that supported home rule for Scotland. In 2008, the incident was made into a film called Stone of Destiny. It seems likely that the escapade was based on the fictional account of a plot by Scottish Nationalists to liberate the Stone of Destiny from Westminster Abbey and to return it to Scotland, as told in Compton Mackenzie's novel The North Wind of Love Bk.1, published six years earlier in 1944.

== Background ==
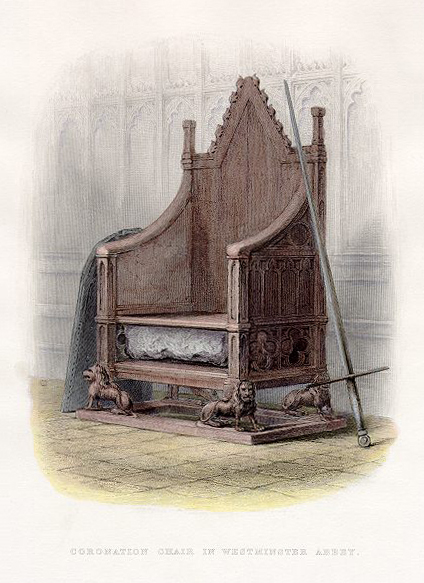
The Stone of Scone in King Edward's Chair

The Stone of Scone, the ancient stone upon which Scottish monarchs had been crowned, was taken from Scone near Perth, Scotland, by troops of King Edward I of England (Longshanks) in 1296 during the Scottish Wars of Independence as a spoil of war, kept in Westminster Abbey in London and fitted into King Edward's Chair. English and then British monarchs were crowned sitting upon the chair and Stone. The Stone was viewed as a symbol of Scottish nationhood; by removing the Stone to London, Edward I was declaring himself 'King of the Scots'.

In 1950, Ian Hamilton, a student at the University of Glasgow, approached Gavin Vernon with a plan to steal the Stone of Scone from Westminster Abbey in London and return it to Scotland. The heist was funded by a Glasgow businessman, Robert Gray, who was a councillor on the Glasgow Corporation. Vernon agreed to participate in the plan along with Kay Matheson and Alan Stuart. By removing the Stone the group hoped to promote their cause for Scottish devolution and to reawaken a sense of national identity amongst the Scottish people.

== Removal of the Stone ==
In December 1950, a few days before Christmas, the four students from Glasgow drove to London in two Ford Anglias, a journey which took them eighteen hours. On arrival in London they had a brief meeting at a Lyons Corner House and decided to make an immediate attempt at removing the Stone from the Abbey. Later that day, Ian Hamilton hid under a trolley in the Abbey, but was caught by a nightwatchman after the Abbey doors had been closed, briefly questioned, and then let go.

The following day (Christmas Eve), Vernon and Stuart returned to Westminster Abbey and learned some information on the watchmen's shifts. In the middle of that night, the three men entered a works yard and gained entrance into Poet's Corner. Reaching the Chapel containing the tomb of Edward I and King Edward's Chair, they pulled down the barrier. On removing the Stone from under the Chair, it crashed to the floor and broke into two pieces. The three men, using Hamilton's coat, dragged the larger piece down the high altar steps, then Hamilton took the smaller piece to one of the cars waiting outside.

Ian Hamilton placed the small piece of Stone in the boot of the car and got into the passenger seat. As he did this, Kay Matheson noticed a policeman in the gaslight; Hamilton and Matheson immediately fell into a lovers' clinch. The policeman stopped and the three proceeded to have a conversation even though it was 5 a.m. Having shared some jokes and a cigarette, Matheson and Hamilton drove off to Victoria, Hamilton getting out on the way to walk back to the Abbey. On his arrival, there was no sign of Vernon and Stuart, so he proceeded to drag the large piece of stone to the car himself. As he was driving away, he saw Vernon and Stuart walking towards him.

The stone was so heavy that the springs on the car were sagging, so Vernon, fearing the alarm had been raised, made his way to Rugby, Warwickshire. Hamilton and Stuart drove to Kent, hid the large piece of stone in a field and made their way back to Scotland. Matheson left her car, containing the small piece of the Stone, with a friend in the Midlands, and like Vernon made her way back to Scotland by train. On discovering that the Stone was missing, the authorities closed the border between Scotland and England for the first time in four hundred years.

A fortnight later, Hamilton and some friends recovered the two pieces and brought them to Glasgow. They hired a stonemason, Baillie Robert Gray, to mend the Stone. Gray placed a brass rod, containing a piece of paper, inside the Stone. What was written on the paper remains unknown.

In April 1951, the police received a message and the Stone was found on the site of the High Altar at Arbroath Abbey where, in 1320, the assertion of Scottish nationhood was made in the Declaration of Arbroath. The Stone was returned to Westminster Abbey in February 1952.

The police conducted an investigation with a focus on Scotland. All four of the group were interviewed and all but Ian Hamilton later confessed to their involvement. The authorities decided not to prosecute as the potential for the event to become politicised was far too great. Sir Hartley Shawcross, addressing Parliament on the matter, said: "The clandestine removal of the Stone from Westminster Abbey, and the manifest disregard for the sanctity of the abbey, were vulgar acts of vandalism which have caused great distress and offence both in England and Scotland. I do not think, however, that the public interest required criminal proceedings to be taken."

== Aftermath ==
At the time of the theft, the United Kingdom was a unified nation and devolution towards its constituent nations was not on the political agenda (although Northern Ireland already had a devolved government). The Scottish National Party had received just 0.4% of the vote in Scotland in the 1950 United Kingdom general election, the Labour Party had withdrawn its commitment to devolution, and the Conservative Party was at the high point of its popularity in Scotland. The raid was completely unexpected and gave the cause of Scottish devolution and nationalism a brief sense of prominence in the public conscience throughout the country. The students became notorious for the raid and in Scotland, they became immensely popular. The recovery of the Stone and the students became synonymous with the devolution and nationalist political movements in Scotland from 1950. The incident encouraged a belief in change, and opened discussion on the Union, which had existed since 1707.

== In popular culture ==
=== Film and television ===
- In December 1980 the film The Pinch aired on BBC 2.
- In the TV-series Highlander (s5e15) the stone was stolen by Duncan, Fitz, and Amanda.
- In 2008, Hamilton's book, The Taking of the Stone of Destiny, was made into a film entitled Stone of Destiny. The film depicted Hamilton (played by Charlie Cox) as the protagonist leading a team of students to reclaim the Stone of Scone.
- BBC Alba released an hour-long bilingual (Scottish Gaelic and English) dramatisation of Kay Matheson's (played by Kathleen MacInnes) interrogation by the police. In this version, Matheson pretends to speak only Gaelic.

=== Music ===
The removal of the stone was the subject of a contemporary Scottish Gaelic song by Donald MacIntyre, "Òran na Cloiche" ("The Song of the Stone"). Its return to London was the subject of an accompanying lament, "Nuair a Chaidh a' Chlach a Thilleadh" ("When the Stone Was Returned").

The removal was parodied in a song The Wee Magic Stane, written by John McEvoy, to the tune of Villikins and his Dinah.

== See also ==
- Scone Palace
