= Westminster Stone theory =

Belief that the stone under the Coronation Chair is not the true Stone of Destiny

The Westminster Stone theory is the belief held by some historians and scholars that the stone which traditionally rests under the Coronation Chair is not the true Stone of Destiny but a 13th-century substitute. Since the chair has been located in Westminster Abbey since that time, adherents to this theory have created the title 'Westminster Stone' to avoid confusion with the 'real' stone (sometimes referred to as the Stone of Scone).

One of the most vocal proponents of this theory was writer and historian Nigel Tranter, who consistently presented the theory throughout his non-fiction books and historical novels. Other historians have held this view, including James S. Richardson, who was an Inspector of Ancient Monuments in the mid-twentieth century. Richardson produced a monograph on the subject.

== History of the Stone of Destiny ==
The Stone of Destiny was the traditional Coronation Stone of the Kings of Scotland and, before that, the Kings of Dál Riata. Legends associate it with Saint Columba, who might have brought it from Ireland as a portable altar. In AD 574, the Stone was used as a coronation chair when Columba anointed and crowned Aedan as the King of Dál Riata.

The Stone of Destiny was kept by the monks of Iona, the traditional headquarters of the Scottish Celtic church, until Viking raiding caused them to move to the mainland, first to Dunkeld, Atholl, and then to Scone. Here it continued to be used in coronations, as a symbol of Scottish Kingship.

== Edward I and the Stone ==
In his attempts to conquer Scotland, Edward I of England invaded in 1296 at the head of an army. Sacking Berwick, beating the Scots at Dunbar, and laying siege to Edinburgh Castle, Edward then proceeded to Scone, intending to take the Stone of Destiny, which was kept at Scone Abbey. He had already taken the Scottish regalia from Edinburgh, which included Saint Margaret's Black Rood relic, but to confiscate an object so precious to the Scots, and so symbolic of their independence, would be a final humiliation. He carried it back to Westminster Abbey. By placing it within the throne of England, he had a potent symbol of his claim for overlordship. It is this stone which sat in Westminster until 1996, when it was returned to Scotland.

== Substitution ==
According to the Westminster Stone theory, the stone Edward removed was not the real Stone of Destiny, but a substitute. The English army was at the Scottish border in mid-March, 1296, and did not reach Scone until June. With three months to anticipate Edward's arrival, there was ample time and incentive for a switch to be made, in order to protect the original relic. Such a substitution could have been instigated by the Abbot of Scone, who stood as custodian. The 'Stone of Destiny' could therefore have been transported to a place of safety, and Edward tricked with a different piece of sandstone.

=== Hiding the 'True Stone' ===
There are many theories regarding the possible resting place of the 'True Stone' since, inspired by logical deduction and, in some cases, fantastical, wishful thinking.

Nigel Tranter believed the True Stone was originally hidden by the Abbot of Scone, and eventually entrusted to the care of Aonghus Óg Mac Domhnaill, by Robert the Bruce. Aonghus Óg hid it in his native Hebrides, where the stone probably remains.

One legend records that after the True Stone was given into the keeping of Aonghus Óg, its keepership passed into the branch of the clan who settled in Sleat. A descendant of this line, C. Iain Alasdair MacDonald, wrote to Tranter, claiming he was now the custodian of the Stone, which was hidden on Skye.

== Evidence ==
=== Arguments for a substitution ===
- The Westminster Stone is a lump of roughly-dressed sandstone, of proportions appropriate for use in building. As such, it is not remarkable or unique, or impressive. The only unusual thing about it is the presence of an iron hoop inserted in each top end, suitable for carrying on a pole.
- Edward I would not have been tricked by anything newly-hewn, but a piece long-since rejected by builders would look suitably ancient, especially if abandoned outside and consequently weathered. That the Westminster Stone has a fault (weak point) is demonstrated by the fact it broke in half when removed from Westminster Abbey in 1950.
- The Westminster Stone is certainly not the stone of Iona mentioned in early documents and traditions. Geologists confirm that the Stone is 'lower Old Red Sandstone' and was quarried in the vicinity of Scone.
- Early seals and documentary descriptions suggest a stone that is larger than the Westminster Stone, darker in colour (possibly basalt or marble), with elaborate carvings. And it might have been retrieved because a letter to the editor of the Morning Chronicle, dated 2 January 1819, states:

On the 19th of November, as the servants belonging to the West Mains of Dunsinane-house, were employed in carrying away stones from the excavation made among the ruins that point out the site of Macbeth's castle here, part of the ground they stood on suddenly gave way, and sank down about six feet, discovering a regularly built vault, about six feet long and four wide. None of the men being injured, curiosity induced them to clear out the subterranean recess, when they discovered among the ruins a large stone, weighing about 500l [230 kg]. which is pronounced to be of the meteoric or semi-metallic kind. This stone must have lain here during the long series of ages since Macbeth's reign. Besides it were also found two round tablets, of a composition resembling bronze. On one of these two lines are engraved, which a gentleman has thus deciphered.— 'The sconce (or shadow) of kingdom come, until Sylphs in air carry me again to Bethel.' These plates exhibit the figures of targets for the arms. [...] The curious here, aware of such traditions, and who have viewed these venerable remains of antiquity, agree that Macbeth may, or rather must, have deposited the stone in question at the bottom of his Castle, on the hill of Dunsinane (from the trouble of the times), where it has been found by the workmen. This curious stone has been shipped for London for the inspection of the scientific amateur, in order to discover its real quality.

- There is no record to show the Scots ever requested the return of the Westminster Stone in the century after its departure, which they would have done if it were an important relic. The absence of a request is quite marked in the Treaty of Northampton. The Scots had been harrying England for some years, and in 1328 the English sued for peace. The Treaty is drawn in Scotland's favour, for they were in the position to make demands. The Treaty stipulates the return of the Scottish regalia and St Margaret's Black Rood, but there is no mention of the Stone of Scone. Tranter states that the English offered to return the stone, but the Scots were not interested.

=== Arguments against a substitution ===
The Westminster Stone theory is not accepted by many historians, or those responsible for the care of the Stone. There are many strong arguments against the theory.

- If Edward I did not remove the true stone, yet claimed to have done so, the Scots' easiest refutation of his claims would be to produce the True Stone. However, there is no record of them doing so.
- Hiding the stone might have been a sensible precaution while the English remained a threat, but it was never produced once the threat was removed.
- Despite its importance as a symbol of Kingship, the stone was not used for subsequent coronations, which it surely would have if still in Scottish possession.
- Legends and theories abound, but no proof has been found to indicate there is another stone.
- If there was warning enough of Edward's intention to remove the Stone, why were the other regalia, documents and Black Rood not hidden also?
- A number of English knights attended the coronation of King John of Scotland only a few years earlier, and would have seen the true stone, but none of them told Edward that his stone was a fake.
- On studying the Stone in 1996, after its return to Scotland, nine periods of workmanship were identified on the Stone's faces, as well as recognisable erosion between the features, which proves it is an ancient artefact.
- Edward had followers from the Scottish nobility who would also have been able to verify the stone's authenticity.
- Dunsinane Hill has the remains of a late prehistoric hill fort, and this has historical associations with Macbeth, but no remains dating to the 11th century have been identified on the hill.

== Second theory: the 1950 substitution ==
On Christmas Day 1950, the Westminster Stone was taken from the abbey by four Scottish students. It remained hidden until April 1951, when a stone was left in Arbroath Abbey. Some speculate that this stone is not the one taken from the Abbey, but merely a copy.

The stone left in Arbroath was damaged, for the Westminster Stone had broken in half when removed from the Coronation Chair, but had been repaired by Glasgow stonemason Robert Gray. However, Gray had made replicas of the Stone in the 1930s, and further fuelled speculation by declaring later that he did not know which stone had been sent back to London as "there were so many copies lying around".

This scenario receives support from a plaque placed in St Columba's Parish Church in Dundee, which claims to mark the site of the 'Stone of Scone', given to them in 1972 by 'Baillie Robert Gray'.

The apparent disrespect shown towards the Stone by Gray and the students is explained by Nigel Tranter, who had some claim to knowledge, as the students asked him to act as an intermediary after the removal of the stone. Tranter later stated that Gray inserted a note inside the Westminster Stone, when repairing it, to the effect that it was 'a block of Old Red Sandstone of no value to anyone', although other reports state that Gray never revealed what the note said.

However, in the 1940s, the British Geological Survey, had carried out a survey of the Stone when the Coronation Chair was undergoing conservation work. The fault line had been noticed as well as the many marks and features of the Stone's surface. This allowed verification of the authenticity of the returned item.

A scanray examination conducted by the Home Office Police Scientific Development Branch in 1973 confirmed the presence of 'three metal rods and sockets, one being at right angles to the other two'. This also indicated that the repaired Westminster Stone, not a replica, had been returned.
