= Scottish Covenant =

1949 petition to the United Kingdom government for Scottish home rule parliament

The insignia of the Scottish Covenant Association

The signing of the covenant. John MacCormick features in the back-right of the photograph.

The Scottish Covenant was a petition to the United Kingdom government to create a home rule Scottish parliament. First proposed in 1930, and promoted by the Scots Independent in 1939, the National Covenant movement reached its peak during the late 1940s and early 1950s. Initiated by John MacCormick, the Covenant was written in October 1949 at the Church of Scotland Assembly Halls in Edinburgh, during the Third National Assembly of the Scottish Convention, a pressure group which evolved into the Scottish Covenant Association.

The petition was "eventually signed by two million people". In the census of 1951, the population of Scotland was 5.1 million.

The Scottish Covenant, however, had little political impact, and it was not until 1977 that proposals for a Scottish Assembly became a serious political prospect. The current Scottish Parliament was convened in 1999.

The name of the Covenant is a reference to the Solemn League and Covenant which established the rights of the Church of Scotland in the 17th century. An Ulster Covenant was also made in 1912, opposing the idea of home rule in Ireland.

== Text of the Covenant ==
"We, the people of Scotland who subscribe to this Engagement, declare our belief that reform in the constitution of our country is necessary to secure good government in accordance with our Scottish traditions and to promote the spiritual and economic welfare of our nation.

We affirm that the desire for such reform is both deep and widespread through the whole community, transcending all political differences and sectional interests, and we undertake to continue united in purpose for its achievement.

With that end in view we solemnly enter into this Covenant whereby we pledge ourselves, in all loyalty to the Crown and within the framework of the United Kingdom, to do everything in our power to secure for Scotland a Parliament with adequate legislative authority in Scottish affairs."

== Response ==
On 3 November 1949, a few days after the Edinburgh launch, the Unionist Party, then the country's dominant political party, forced an adjournment debate in the House of Commons calling for a royal commission into Scottish affairs, with the aim of increasing administrative devolution to Scotland, including a larger ministerial team at the Scottish Office and the establishment of Scottish nationalised industries.

The Labour government of the time dismissed the Scottish Covenant. In answer to a question in the House of Lords in May 1950 put to His Majesty's Government, Labour Peer Lord Morrison both objected in principle to home rule and stated that the matters involved were 'much too complicated' to be put to referendum.

In 1955, Colin Thornton-Kemsley MP for North Angus and Mearns pointed out that despite the Covenant only one of the 71 MPs representing Scottish seats could be said to support devolution, that one member being Jo Grimond, Liberal MP for Orkney and Shetland.

The Scottish philosopher Herbert James Paton cites the 1949 Covenant in his disquisition The Claim of Scotland (1968) and partly frames his defence, robustly yet peaceably set out, with reference to the governmental omission in the 1950s to heed the Covenant and its signatories.

== See also ==
- Covenant (historical)
