= Scottish Covenant Association =

- Formation: 1942
- Dissolved: 1950s
- Purpose: Scottish Covenant; Scottish devolution
- Key people: John MacCormick

The Scottish Covenant Association was a non-partisan political organisation in Scotland in the 1940s and 1950s seeking to establish a devolved Scottish Assembly. It was formed by John MacCormick who had left the Scottish National Party in 1942 when they decided to support all-out independence for Scotland rather than devolution as had been their position.

MacCormick took many supporters with him, and set up the Scottish Union, which later became the Scottish Convention before eventually evolving into the Scottish Covenant Association. The name Covenant was a direct reference to the Solemn League and Covenant signed by the Scottish Covenanters of the 16th and 17th centuries. In 1950 the organisation had offices in Glasgow.

The Covenant Association played an enormous part in mobilising Scottish public opinion in favour of devolution. The Scottish Covenant "was eventually signed by two million people". Ultimately though the Association's disengagement from the conventional political process meant that this enthusiasm waned and had no outlet, with it being some 50 years before devolution was secured for Scotland.

Perhaps the greatest coup of the Covenant Association was the removal of the Stone of Destiny from Westminster Abbey by four of their members (Ian Hamilton, Kay Matheson, Gavin Vernon and Alan Stuart) over Christmas in 1950. This famous act attracted huge publicity for the cause of Scottish home rule.

== See also ==
- Scottish Covenant
- Stone of Destiny (2008 film)
