= Ian Hamilton (advocate) =

Scottish lawyer and nationalist (1925–2022)

Ian Hamilton KC
- Born: Ian Robertson Hamilton; 13 September 1925; Paisley, Scotland
- Died: 3 October 2022 (aged 97); North Connel, Scotland
- Education: University of Glasgow
- Occupation: Advocate

Ian Robertson Hamilton KC (13 September 1925 – 3 October 2022) was a Scottish lawyer and nationalist, best known for his part in the return of the Stone of Destiny from Westminster Abbey to Arbroath Abbey in 1950.

== Early life ==
Hamilton was born in Paisley, Scotland, on 13 September 1925, the son of a tailor. He attended the John Neilson Institution in Paisley then Allan Glen's School in Glasgow, before going on to the University of Glasgow to study law, after having served in the Royal Air Force.

== National activism ==
It was at University where Hamilton became politically active. A participant in debates at the Glasgow University Union, he was a member of the Glasgow University Scottish Nationalist Association and the Scottish Covenant Association. He was also the campaign manager for the successful bid to have John MacCormick elected Rector of the University.

=== Stone of Destiny ===
On Christmas Eve 1950, Hamilton, along with three other student Scottish nationalists including Kay Matheson, removed the Stone of Destiny from its place under the Coronation Chair in Westminster Abbey, London. Originally used for the coronation of Scottish monarchs, the Stone had been removed to England by Edward I in 1296 to bolster his claim to the throne of Scotland. After the Acts of Union 1707 between Scotland and England, it was used for the coronation of British monarchs. As such, Hamilton's action in returning the Stone to Scotland was applauded as a symbolic triumph for Scottish nationalism. The Stone was turned over to the Church of Scotland, which passed it to the authorities in April 1951. Hamilton and his accomplices were charged, but never prosecuted. The Stone was eventually returned to Scotland in 1996, with provision for subsequent use in the coronation of British monarchs.

In 2008, Charles Martin Smith wrote and directed a feature film entitled Stone Of Destiny, based on these events, in which Hamilton was portrayed by Charlie Cox. Hamilton himself had a small part as an English businessman.

=== MacCormick v. Lord Advocate ===
When first admitted to the bar as a young advocate in 1953, Hamilton refused to swear allegiance to Queen Elizabeth II arguing that she could only be referred to as "Queen Elizabeth" (sans regnal number) in Scotland as the regnal numbers counted Queen Elizabeth I, who had not ruled over Scotland or any of the subsequent united kingdoms which it has entered into. MacCormick v Lord Advocate, which Hamilton brought with rector John MacCormick against the Crown, failed. The Inner House of the Scottish Court of Session held that the monarch's title is the sole prerogative of the sovereign, and the Crown had accepted a system whereby regnal numbers were taken from the larger of both former kingdoms in the United Kingdom, that is England and not Scotland. (It was later suggested by Winston Churchill after the accession of Elizabeth II that, in the future, the higher of the two numerals from the English and Scottish sequences could be used. This system has yet to be put to the test.)

== Career ==
After graduating from university, Hamilton was admitted to the bar and became a practising lawyer.

His play The Tinkers of the World was staged at Edinburgh's Gateway Theatre early in 1957.

Hamilton joined the Labour Party for a short while, but spent most of his life in active politics as a member of the Scottish National Party (SNP). He was SNP candidate for the Strathclyde East seat at the 1994 election to the European Parliament, as well as a candidate for the SNP in the Greenock and Inverclyde seat at the 1999 election to the Scottish Parliament.

Hamilton was Rector of the University of Aberdeen from 1994 to 1996 and was awarded the degree of Doctor of Laws (Honoris Causa) in his final year. He was also chosen by the Glasgow University Scottish Nationalist Association as their candidate for the Glasgow University Rectorial election in 1999 in which he came second to the actor, Ross Kemp.

Hamilton wrote two autobiographical works, that are also in part polemical, A Touch of Treason (1990) and A Touch More Treason (1994). At one time he wrote a blog, where he posted commentary on Scottish social and political life, and latterly occasionally posted thoughts to Twitter including support for Scottish independence. He died in North Connel on 3 October 2022, aged 97.

=== Royal Bank of Scotland lawsuit ===
In February 2009, BBC News and The Daily Telegraph reported that Hamilton was suing the Royal Bank of Scotland (RBS) over claims they had mis-sold shares to him in April 2008. Hamilton purchased 640 shares at £2 per share as part of a £12 billion rights issue. The writ he lodged in court claimed that the bank invited shareholders, including him and his wife, to invest in a rights issue, an offer that he took up on her behalf. The writ further alleged that RBS induced him to invest his money by "concealing the true state of their finances". He further alleged that the bank was "negligent in representing themselves as solvent at all material times when in fact they were insolvent".

RBS stated they would defend themselves vigorously against the claims made by Hamilton in the small claims court, but he dropped the case on 26 February 2009 after the sheriff at Oban Sheriff Court ruled that it would have to be considered at a higher court, given the legal and factual complexity of the case.

== Portrayals in popular culture ==
In 2008, Hamilton's book, The Taking of the Stone of Destiny, was made into a movie entitled Stone of Destiny. The film depicted Hamilton (played by Charlie Cox) as the protagonist leading a team of students to reclaim the Stone of Destiny. Additionally, Hamilton had a small cameo role.

Academic offices
Preceded by Colin Bell	Rector of the University of Aberdeen; 1993–1996	Succeeded by Allan Macartney
