= Stone of Scone =

Ancient Scottish coronation artefact

Coordinates: 56°23′45.06″N 3°25′45.84″W

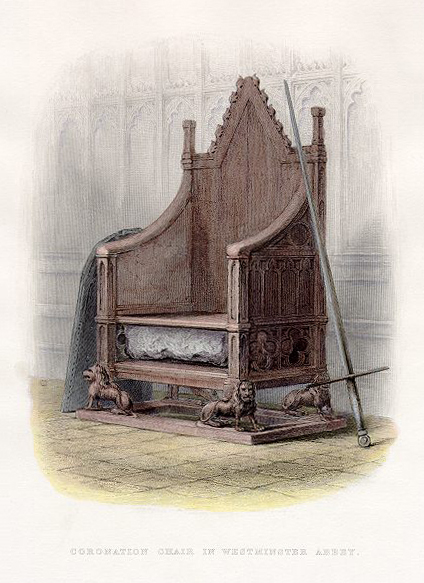
The Stone of Scone in the Coronation Chair at Westminster Abbey, 1859

The Stone of Scone (/ˈskuːn/; Scottish Gaelic: An Lia Fàil, meaning Stone of Destiny, also called clach-na-cinneamhuinn; Scots: Stane o Scone) is an oblong block of red sandstone that was used in the coronation of Scottish monarchs until the 13th century when it was seized by Edward I during the First War of Scottish Independence and taken to England. Thereafter, it was used in the coronation of English and later British monarchs.

It is considered an ancient symbol of the Scottish monarchy and the Kingdom of Scotland, with its first recorded use being in 1249 for the coronation of Alexander III of Scotland. The Stone measures 26 by 16 3/4 by 10 1/2 inches (66 cm × 43 cm × 27 cm) and weighs approximately 336 lb (152 kg; 24 st). A cross is roughly incised on one surface, and an iron ring at each end aids with transport. Monarchs sat on the Stone of Scone itself, until a wooden platform was added to the Coronation Chair in the 17th century.

The artefact was originally kept at the Scone Abbey, now ruined, in Scone, near Perth. In 1296, the forces of Edward I of England captured it during Edward's invasion of Scotland. The Stone has been used in the coronation of English and British monarchs for over 500 years. In 1996, the stone was returned to Scotland, and kept in Edinburgh Castle with the Honours of Scotland. The stone remains property of the Crown, with Crown Estate Scotland, an executive agency of the Scottish Government responsible for the stone in the rights of the monarch. It is transported to London for use at coronations under the supervision of the Keeper of the Great Seal of Scotland. Since March 2024, it has been on permanent public display in Perth Museum, Perth, Scotland.

== Origin and legends ==
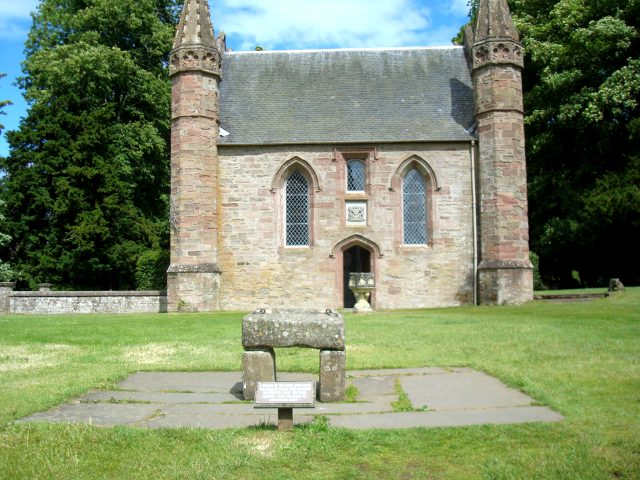
A replica of the Stone of Scone in front of a much later chapel

In the 14th century the English cleric and historian Walter of Guisborough identified the previous location of the Scottish coronation stone as the monastery of Scone, three kilometres (two miles) north of Perth:

Apud Monasterium de Scone positus est lapis pergrandis in ecclesia Dei, juxta magnum altare, concavus quidem ad modum rotundae cathedrae confectus, in quo futuri reges loco quasi coronationis ponebantur ex more.

Translation:

At the monastery of Scone, in the church of God, near to the high altar, was placed a large stone, hollowed out as a round chair, on which future kings were placed for their coronation, according to custom.

Various theories and legends exist about the stone's history prior to its placement in Scone. One story concerns Fergus, son of Erc, the first King of the Scots (r. c. 498 – 501) in Scotland, whose transport of the Stone from Ireland to Argyll, where he was crowned on it, was recorded in Orygynale Cronykil of Scotland, a 15th-century chronicle. Some versions identify the stone brought by Fergus with the Lia Fáil used at Tara for inaugurating the High Kings of Ireland.

Other traditions contend that the Lia Fáil remains at Tara. Inis Fáil, "The Island of Destiny," is one of the traditional names of Ireland. Other legends place the origins of the Stone in Biblical times and identify it as the Stone of Jacob, taken by Jacob from Bethel while on the way to Haran (Genesis 28:10–22). This same Stone of Jacob was then supposedly taken to ancient Ireland by the prophet Jeremiah.

Contradicting these legends, geologists have proven that the stone taken by Edward I to Westminster is a "lower Old Red Sandstone," which was quarried in the vicinity of Scone. Doubts over the authenticity of the stone at Westminster exist: a blog post by retired Scottish academic and writer of historical fiction Marie MacPherson shows that they date back at least two hundred years.

A letter to the editor of the Morning Chronicle, dated 2 January 1819, states:

On the 19th of November, as the servants belonging to the West Mains of Dunsinane-house, were employed in carrying away stones from the excavation made among the ruins that point out the site of Macbeth's castle here, part of the ground they stood on suddenly gave way, and sank down about six feet, discovering a regularly built vault, about six feet long and four wide. None of the men being injured, curiosity induced them to clear out the subterranean recess, when they discovered among the ruins a large stone, weighing about 500 lb [230 kg], which is pronounced to be of the meteoric or semi-metallic kind. This stone must have lain here during the long series of ages since Macbeth's reign. Beside it were also found two round tablets, of a composition resembling bronze. On one of these two lines are engraved, which a gentleman has thus deciphered. – "The sconce (or shadow) of kingdom come, until Sylphs in air carry me again to Bethel." These plates exhibit the figures of targets for the arms. From time immemorial it has been believed among us here, that unseen hands brought Jacob's pillow from Bethel and dropped it on the site where the palace of Scoon now stands. A strong belief is also entertained by many in this part of the country that it was only a representation of this Jacob's pillow that Edward sent to Westminster, the sacred stone not having been found by him. The curious here, aware of such traditions, and who have viewed these venerable remains of antiquity, agree that Macbeth may, or rather must, have deposited the stone in question at the bottom of his Castle, on the hill of Dunsinane (from the trouble of the times), where it has been found by the workmen. This curious stone has been shipped for London for the inspection of the scientific amateur, in order to discover its real quality.

Dunsinane Hill has the remains of a late prehistoric hill fort, and this has historical associations with Macbeth, but no remains dating to the 11th century have been identified on the hill.

== Westminster Abbey ==
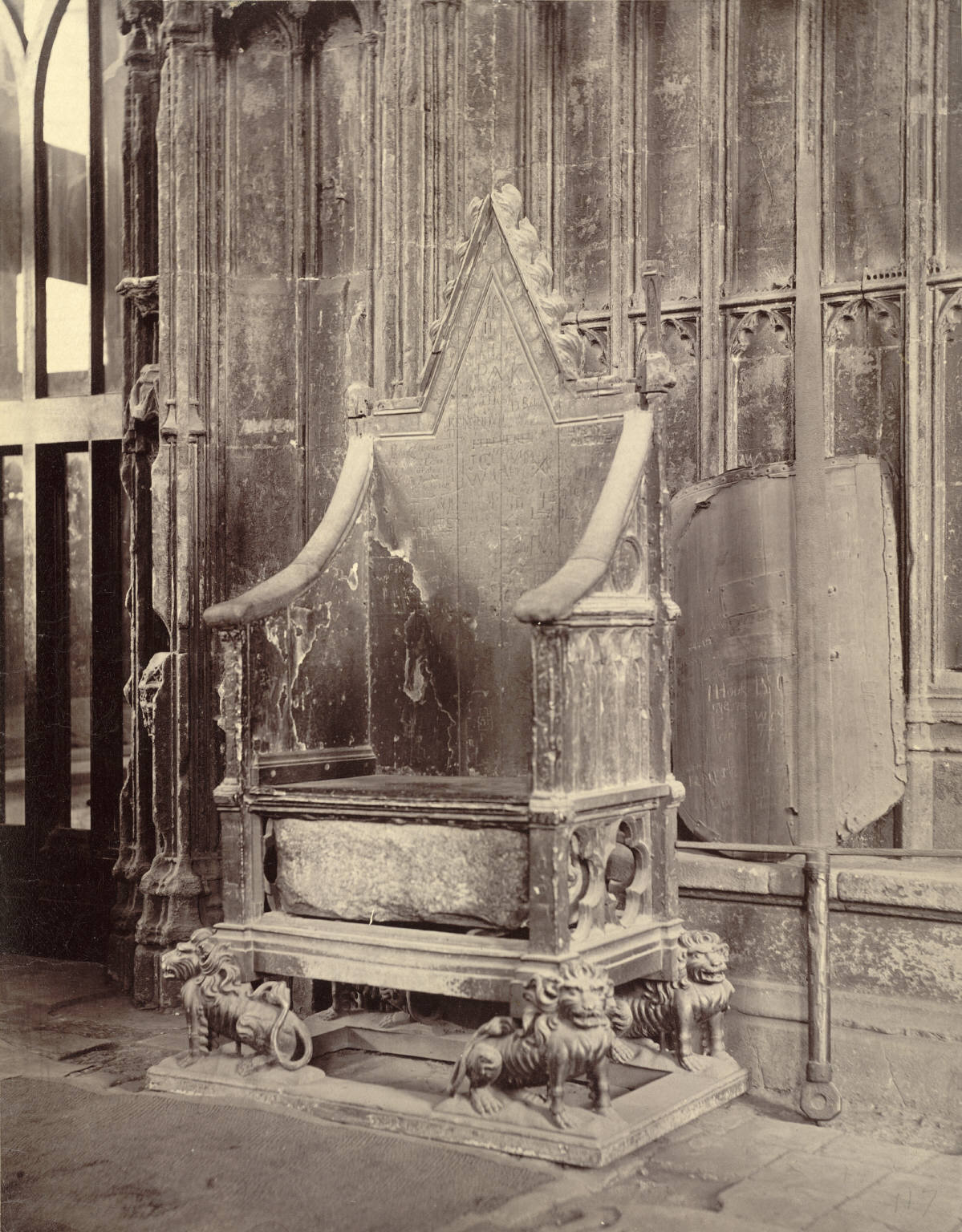
The Stone of Scone in the Coronation Chair at Westminster Abbey, photo c. 1875 – c. 1885. In 1914, the stone was broken in half by a suffragette bombing.

In 1296, during the First Scottish War of Independence, Edward I of England took the stone as spoils of war and removed it to Westminster Abbey, where it was fitted into a wooden chair – known as the Coronation Chair or King Edward's Chair – on which most subsequent English and then British sovereigns have been crowned. Edward I sought to claim the status of the "Lord Paramount" of Scotland, with the right to oversee its King.

Some cast doubt over whether the real stone was captured by Edward I. The Westminster Stone theory posits that the monks at Scone Palace hid the real stone in the River Tay, or buried it on Dunsinane Hill, and that the English troops were tricked into taking a substitute. Some proponents of this theory claim that historic descriptions of the stone do not match the present stone.

In the 1328 Treaty of Northampton between the Kingdom of Scotland and the Kingdom of England, England agreed to return the captured stone to Scotland; rioting crowds prevented it from being removed from Westminster Abbey. The stone remained in England for another six centuries. When James VI of Scotland assumed the English throne as James I of England, he was crowned at Westminster Abbey on the stone. For the next century, the Stuart kings and queens of Scotland once again sat on the stone – but at their coronation as kings and queens of, and in, England.

=== 1914 suffragette bombing ===
On 11 June 1914, as part of the suffragette bombing and arson campaign of 1912–1914, suffragettes of the Women's Social and Political Union planted a bomb loaded with metal bolts and nuts to act as shrapnel next to the Coronation Chair and Stone; no serious injuries were reported in the aftermath of the subsequent explosion despite the building having been busy with 80–100 visitors, but the deflagration blew off a corner of the Coronation Chair and broke the Stone in half – although this was not discovered until 1950, when four Scottish nationalists broke into the church to steal the stone and return it to Scotland. Two days after the Westminster Abbey bombing, a second suffragette bomb was discovered before it could explode in St Paul's Cathedral.

=== Early 20th century ===
The possibility that the Coronation Chair could be damaged or destroyed by German air raids during the Second World War resulted in it being moved to Gloucester Cathedral for the duration of the war. Concerns about the propaganda implications of the Stone falling into German hands led to it being hidden behind ancient lead coffins in a burial vault under Abbot Islip's Chapel, situated off the north ambulatory of the abbey.

Other than the Dean, Paul de Labilliere and the Surveyor of the Fabric of Westminster Abbey, Charles Peers, only a few other people knew of its hiding place. Worried that the secret could be lost if all of them were killed during the war, Peers drew up three maps showing its location. Two were sent in sealed envelopes to Canada, one to the Canadian Prime Minister William Lyon Mackenzie King, who deposited it in the Bank of Canada's vault in Ottawa. The other went to Albert Edward Matthews, the Lieutenant Governor of Ontario, who stored his envelope in the Bank of Montreal in Toronto. Once he had received word that the envelopes had been received, Peers destroyed the third map, which he had been keeping at his bank.

Peers later received a suggestion via the Office of Works that the Stone should be sent to Scotland for safekeeping:

I trust the Office of Works will not lend itself to this attempt by the Scotch to get hold of the Stone by a side wind. You cannot be so simple as not to know that this acquisitive nation have ever since the time of Edward I been attempting by fair means or foul, to get possession of the Stone, and during my time at Westminster we have received warnings from the Police that Scottish emissaries were loose in London, intending to steal the Stone and we had better lock up the Confessor's Chapel, where it is normally kept.

== Returning to Scotland ==
=== First return ===
On Christmas Day 1950, a group of four Scottish students (Ian Hamilton, Gavin Vernon, Kay Matheson, and Alan Stuart) removed the stone from Westminster Abbey, intending to return it to Scotland. During the removal, the stone broke into two pieces. After burying the greater part of the Stone in a Kent field, where they camped for a few days, they uncovered the buried stone and returned to Scotland, along with a new accomplice, John Josselyn.

According to an American diplomat who was posted in Edinburgh at the time, the stone was briefly hidden in a trunk in the basement of the consulate's Public Affairs Officer, without his knowledge, then brought up further north. The smaller piece was similarly brought north at a later time. The entire stone was passed to Glasgow politician Robert Gray, who arranged for a Glasgow stonemason to repair it.

The British Government ordered a major search for the stone, but were unsuccessful. The stone was left by those that had been hiding it on the altar of Arbroath Abbey on 11 April 1951, a property owned by the Church of Scotland. Once the London police were informed of its whereabouts, the stone was returned to Westminster four months after its removal. Afterward, rumours circulated that copies of the stone had been made, and that the returned stone was not the original.

=== Second return ===
External videos
- The Stone of Destiny Makes Triumphal Return to Scotland, a 1996 news segment about the stone's return to Scotland

On 3 July 1996, in response to a growing discussion around Scottish cultural history, the British Government announced that the stone would return to Scotland, 700 years after it had been taken. On 15 November 1996, after a handover ceremony at the border between representatives of the Home Office and of the Scottish Office, the stone was transported to Edinburgh Castle. An official handover ceremony occurred in the Castle on 30 November 1996, St Andrew's Day, to mark the arrival of the stone. The then Prince Andrew, Duke of York (later Andrew Mountbatten-Windsor), representing Queen Elizabeth II, formally handed over the Royal Warrant transferring the stone into the safekeeping of the Commissioners for the Regalia. It currently resides in Perth.

=== Temporary return to London ===
In September 2022, Historic Environment Scotland announced that the stone would temporarily return to Westminster Abbey for the coronation of Charles III. It left the castle on 27 April 2023 in a procession led by Joseph Morrow, the Lord Lyon King of Arms, arriving in Westminster Abbey on 29 April. After the coronation on 6 May, the stone was put on temporary display at the abbey before being returned to Edinburgh Castle later in the month.

== Public display ==
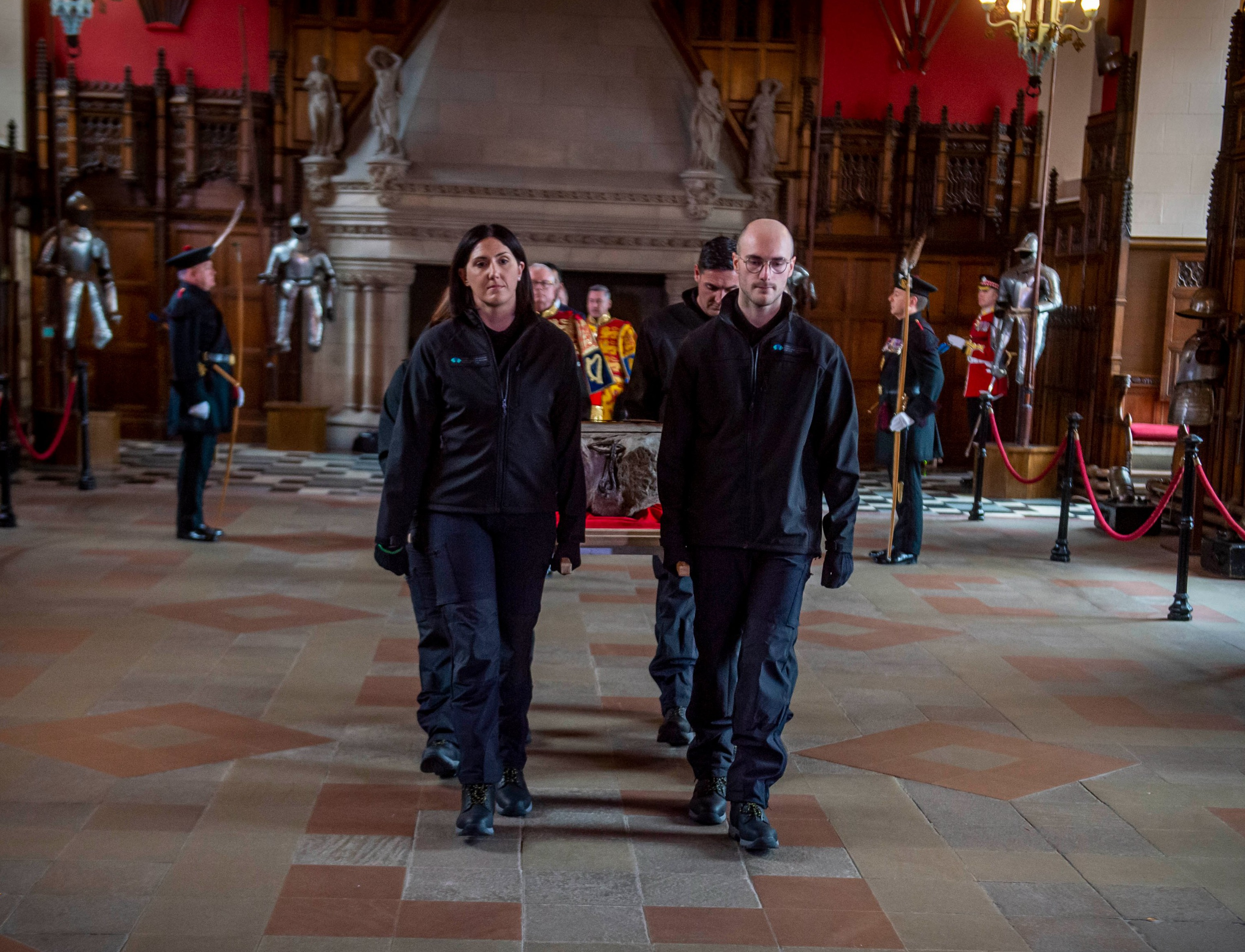
The Stone of Scone being carried out from Edinburgh Castle in preparation for its use at the coronation in 2023 of Charles III

As part of a consultation in 2019, the Scottish Government asked the public for their views on the preferred location for public display of the Stone of Scone. Two options were proposed: featuring it as the centrepiece of a proposed new Perth Museum (a £23 million redevelopment of the former Perth City Hall in Perth, Scotland) or remaining at Edinburgh Castle in a major redevelopment of the existing display.

In December 2020, the Scottish Government announced that the stone would be relocated to the Perth Museum. The museum opened on 30 March 2024, with the stone as one of its main exhibits.

== Vandalism ==
On 15 November 2023, three members of environmental activist group "This is Rigged" smashed the stone's protective glass case, and spray-painted the words "Is Treasa Tuath Na Tighearna" (Scottish Gaelic for "The People Are Mightier Than A Lord") on the glass, alongside the group's logo. Edinburgh Castle was closed to the public for the rest of the day. The activists were arrested following the action, which they claimed was intended to pressure supermarkets to reduce food prices and the Scottish Government to fund a community food hub.

In November 2024, two of the three pled guilty at Edinburgh Sheriff Court to charges of malicious damage in connection with the incident. In December, the third protester also pled guilty to damaging the cabinet; his not guilty plea to a charge of breaching the peace was accepted.

On 12 July 2025, an Australian national wearing a kilt was arrested after he was caught smashing the stone's protective glass case while it was on display at the Perth Museum. He was subsequently charged with malicious mischief.

== Missing fragments ==
In January 2024, a fragment of the stone, previously thought to have been lost, was found in a cupboard at the headquarters of the Scottish National Party. According to Scottish cabinet papers released on 1 January, the fragment was given to the then first minister Alex Salmond in 2008 by the son of John MacCormick, who had been involved in the removal of the stone from Westminster Abbey. Sir John Elvidge, who was Permanent Secretary to the Cabinet at the time, told Salmond that he could keep the fragment. Salmond then passed it to the SNP for safekeeping.

Historic Environment Scotland subsequently carried out tests on the fragment, which established it was genuine "beyond reasonable doubt." In May 2024, it was announced that the fragment would be held by the Commissioners for the Safeguarding of the Regalia "on behalf of the Nation and the people of Scotland."

In January 2025, the BBC reported that a search was in progress for "up to 30" further missing fragments. These fragments were separated from the stone while it was being repaired shortly after the 1950 theft. Robert Gray, who oversaw the repair, passed them to the students who carried out the theft, as well as to "those he admired in the campaign for Scottish independence." The search is being undertaken by Sally Foster from the University of Stirling; she has so far been able to confirm the locations of four of them.

In November 2025, Foster reported that she had identified Detective Inspector William Kerr as the recipient of one of the fragments. Kerr had been involved in the search for the stone in 1951. Robert Gray was thought to have handed him the fragment in 1956.

== In literature ==
- In the 1944 novel The North Wind of Love, Book One – the fifth book in the series The Four Winds of Love – the Scottish writer Compton Mackenzie imagines a romantic nationalist conspiracy in which a group of young Scottish idealists plot to remove the Stone of Destiny from Westminster Abbey. The real-life theft of the stone in 1950 could have been motivated by Mackenzie's fictional account.
- In "The Adventure of the Stone of Scone," the private detective Solar Pons solves in one of his cases the theft of the Stone of Scone. This story is part of the collection The Return of Solar Pons by August Derleth, published in 1958.
- The Stone of Scone is parodied as the Scone of Stone in Terry Pratchett's 24th novel of the Discworld series The Fifth Elephant.
- The connection between the Stone of Scone and Jacob's Pillow is central to the plot of This Jagged Way by Tormad Cockburn.

== See also ==
- Blarney Stone (Ireland)
- Coronation Stone, Kingston upon Thames (England)
- Duke's Chair (Austria)
- Edward Faraday Odlum
- History of Scotland
- Lia Fáil (Ireland)
- List of individual rocks
- Omphalos
- Prince's Stone (Slovenia)
- Stone of Jacob
- Stones of Mora (Sweden)
