= Stone of Jacob =

Stone mentioned in the Bible

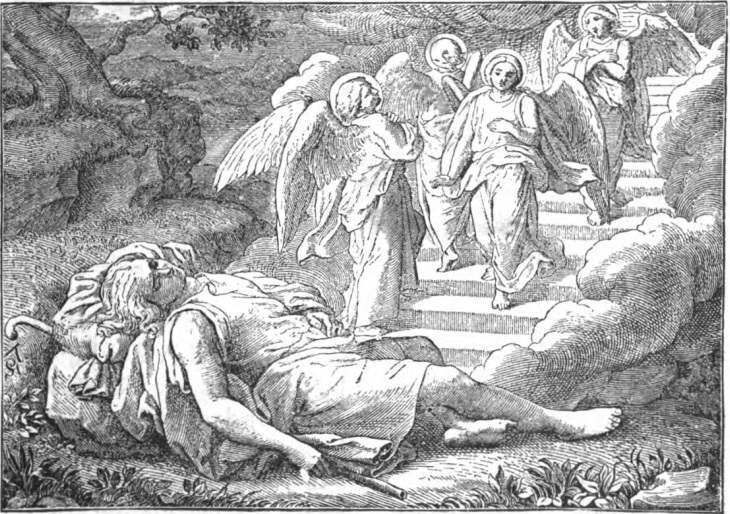
Illustration of Jacob's dream in the Book of Genesis

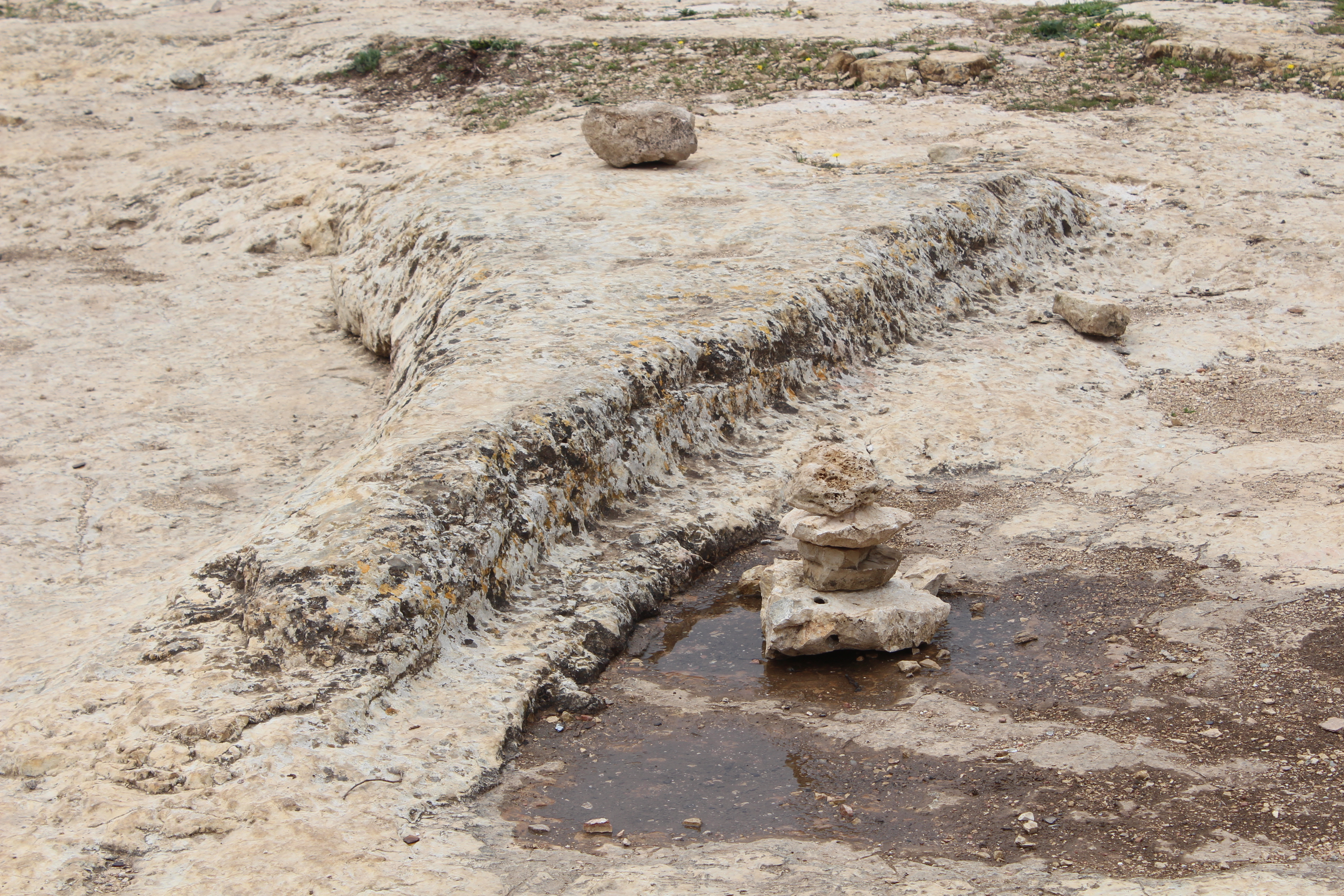
Supposed site of Jacob's rest in Beit El, Binyamin district, as theorised by Zev Vilnay

The Stone of Jacob appears in the Book of Genesis as the stone used as a pillow by the Israelite patriarch Jacob at the place later called Bet-El. As Jacob had a vision in his sleep, he then consecrated the stone to God. More recently, the stone has been claimed by Scottish folklore and through it by British Israelism to be the same as the Stone of Scone.

== Biblical narrative ==
According to account given in Genesis, Jacob was fleeing from his elder twin brother Esau, whom he had tricked out of receiving their father Isaac's blessing of the first-born. On his flight, Jacob rested at a city called Luz and used a group of stones as a pillow.

Jacob left Beersheba and set out for Harran.

When he reached a certain place, he stopped for the night because the sun had set. Taking one of the stones there, he put it under his head and lay down to sleep.

He had a dream in which he saw a stairway resting on the earth, with its top reaching to heaven, and the angels of God were ascending and descending on it.

There above it stood the Lord, and he said: "I am the Lord, the God of your father Abraham and the God of Isaac. I will give you and your descendants the land on which you are lying.

Your descendants will be like the dust of the earth, and you will spread out to the west and to the east, to the north and to the south. All peoples on earth will be blessed through you and your offspring.

I am with you and will watch over you wherever you go, and I will bring you back to this land. I will not leave you until I have done what I have promised you."

— Genesis 28:10-15, New International Version

After waking up, Jacob exclaimed, "How awesome is this place! This is none other than the house of God; this is the gate of heaven." Subsequently, he called the place Bethel, which translates to "House of God". He set up the stone he had slept on as a pillow, and consecrated it. He also made a vow to God in reference to his eventual return.

== Other traditions ==
Some Scottish legends surrounding the Stone of Scone, traditionally used for coronations of Scottish kings in the High Middle Ages, have identified this stone with the Stone of Jacob. Supposedly the Stone of Jacob was brought to Ireland by the prophet Jeremiah and thence to Scotland. The 17th-century writer John Speed, describing the coronation of James I, calls the stone at Westminster Abbey by the Latin name, saxum Jacobi.

These legends also feature prominently in British Israelism a belief system that holds the British royal family is descended from King David. From 1308 to 1996, the Stone of Scone rested in the King Edward's Chair at Westminster. On 23 December 2020 it was announced by the Scottish Government that the stone is to be relocated to a newly renovated 'Hall of Destiny' in Perth's city centre, only a few miles from Scone.
