= Scottish Assembly =

Former proposed legislature for Scotland

The Scottish Assembly (Scottish Gaelic: Comhdhail na Alba) was a proposed legislature for Scotland that would have devolved a set list of powers from the Parliament of the United Kingdom. The Labour Government led the Scotland Act 1978 through Westminster which provided for the establishment of the Scottish Assembly.

Although the majority of those who voted at the referendum on 1 March 1979 voted in favour of the Act, the provisions were not put in place due to the additional requirement that 40% of the total electorate also vote in favour. The Scottish National Party subsequently refused to support the government in a later vote of no confidence. Scottish devolution would not become a reality until 1999 following the Scotland Act 1998 establishing the Scottish Parliament.

== History ==
A devolved Scottish Assembly that would have some form of legislative powers in jurisdiction over Scotland was a long-held political priority for many individuals and organisations. The drive for home rule first took concrete shape in the nineteenth century, as demands for it in Ireland were met with similar (although not as widespread) demands in Scotland.

=== 19th century ===
In 1853 the National Association for the Vindication of Scottish Rights was established. This body was close to the Conservatives and was motivated by a desire to secure more focus on Scottish problems in response to what they felt was undue attention being focused on Ireland by the then Liberal government.

This body was concerned with increasing the attention that Scotland was receiving and did not advocate legislative devolution in the form of an assembly as such, but nevertheless, it marked the beginning of a political focus on Scotland.

Shortly after this, the Liberals began to commit to home rule. In 1871, William Ewart Gladstone stated at a meeting held in Aberdeen that if Ireland was to be granted home rule, then the same should apply to Scotland. In 1885 the post of Secretary for Scotland was re-established as the demands for greater political focus on Scotland grew. In the following year Gladstone introduced a home rule bill for Ireland helping to prompt the formation of the Scottish Home Rule Association, a nominally non-partisan political organisation, but actually closely tied with the Liberals, which aimed for the establishment of an assembly.

=== Early 20th century ===
From 1895 to 1905 the Conservatives and their Liberal Unionist allies were in power (the two combined usually referred to by the single moniker "Unionist"), and home rule did not feature as part of their plans. However, the return of a Liberal government in 1905 gave great hope to those seeking an assembly, as the Liberals were officially committed to the idea. But it did not feature as an immediate priority of government, and by the time a Scottish home rule bill was presented to the Westminster Parliament in 1913, and passed second reading but did not proceed further due to the First World War.

After the war a second Scottish Home Rule Association was formed (the first had fallen into inactivity). This was driven not only by Liberals but also by those involved in the growing Labour Party and the Independent Labour Party in particular. The Labour Party, formed in 1900, was formally committed to establishing an assembly for Scotland and this seemed to increase prospects for home rule.

The demands for political change in the way in which Scotland was run changed dramatically in the 1920s when Scottish nationalists started to form various organisations. The Scots National League was formed in 1920 in favour of Scottish independence, and this movement was superseded in 1928 by the formation of the National Party of Scotland, which became the Scottish National Party (SNP) in 1934.

At first the SNP sought only the establishment of a devolved Scottish assembly, but in 1942 they changed this to support all-out independence. This caused the resignation of John MacCormick from the SNP and he formed the Scottish Covenant Association. This body proved to be the biggest mover in favour of the formation of a Scottish assembly, collecting over two million signatures in the late 1940s and early 1950s and attracting support from across the political spectrum. However, without formal links to any of the political parties it withered, and devolution and the establishment of an assembly were put on the political back burner.

However, by the 1960s the SNP's support was growing, as shown by their victory in the 1967 Hamilton by-election. The pro Union parties responded by committing themselves to supporting devolution. The Labour government formed the Kilbrandon Commission to draw up devolution plans, and Edward Heath committed the Conservatives to supporting some form of devolution at the 1968 Scottish Conservative Conference in Perth (commonly known as his Declaration of Perth).

=== 1970s ===
However the SNP had a disappointing result in the 1970 general election, and for the first part of the 1970s devolution under Heath's government was off the cards. But significant SNP advances in the general elections in 1974 brought the issue to the fore again.

In 1978 the Labour government passed the Scotland Act which legislated for the establishment of a Scottish Assembly, provided the Scots voted for such in a referendum. However, the Labour Party was bitterly divided on the subject of devolution. Despite officially favouring it, vast numbers of members opposed the establishment of an assembly, and this division caused the failure to reach the required 40% of the electorate voting in favour of an assembly (that itself was a quota only added to the Scotland Act by an amendment proposed by a Labour MP).

The ensuing general election in 1979 proved electorally disastrous for both Labour and the SNP, and it seemed that the prospects for a Scottish Assembly were remote. However, in the early 1980s a number of Labour Party and SNP members decided to form the Campaign for a Scottish Assembly, which pamphleteered and lobbied for devolution. This campaign, combined with growing resentment at the fact that despite a majority of Scots voting against the Conservatives they were forming their government, increased demands for the establishment of a devolved Scottish Assembly.

Two possible contenders for the post of first secretary were the Reverend Geoff Shaw, leader of Strathclyde Regional Council, and Professor John P Mackintosh MP – but both died in 1978.

== Scottish Assembly proposed in the Scotland Act 1978 ==
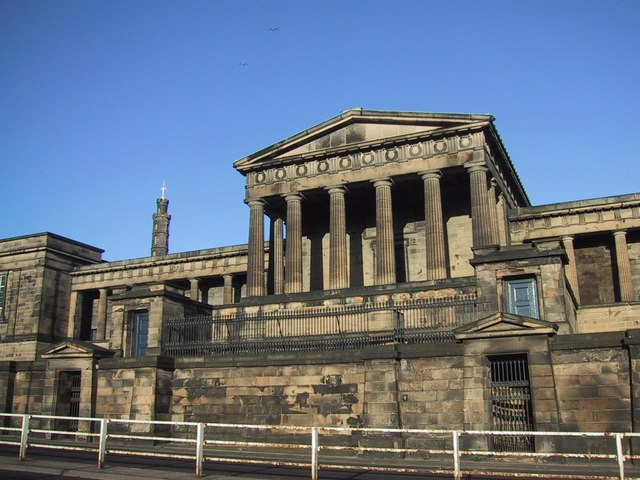
Old Royal High School, the proposed site of the Scottish Assembly

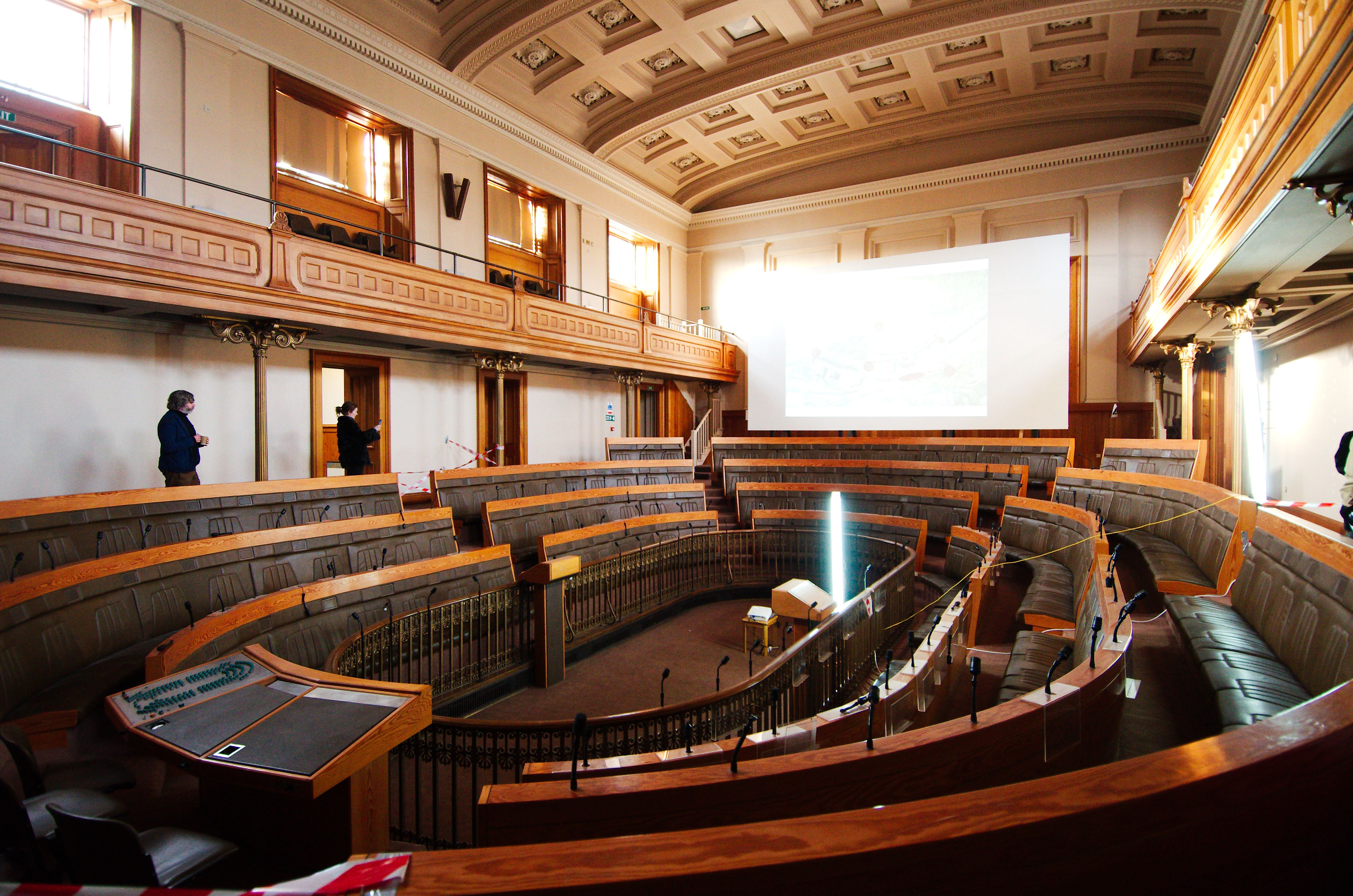
Debating chamber prepared for the proposed assembly

=== Structure ===
Had the Scotland Act 1978 entered force, it would have created a Scottish Assembly with limited legislative powers. There would have been a "Scottish Executive" headed by a "First Secretary", taking over some of the functions of the Secretary of State for Scotland. Members would have been elected by the first past the post system.

Meetings of the Scottish Assembly would have been held at the Old Royal High School in Regent Road, Edinburgh. The former school hall was converted into a debating chamber for use by the Scottish Assembly, including the installation of microphones and new olive green leather seating.

=== Powers and legislation ===
The Scottish Assembly would have had the power to introduce primary legislation (to be known as Measures of the Scottish Assembly) within defined areas of competence. This form of legislation would not receive royal assent like Acts of Parliament; instead, the legislation would be signed via an Order in Council, which the monarch would sign and append to the measure once passed.

The areas of responsibility included:

- Education
- The environment
- Health
- Home affairs
- Legal matters
- Social services

Responsibility for agriculture, fisheries and food would be divided between the Assembly and the United Kingdom government, while the latter would retain control of electricity supply.

== Scottish Constitutional Convention ==
In 1989 the Scottish Constitutional Convention was formed encompassing the Labour Party and the Lib-Dems as well as other parties, local authorities, and huge sections of civic Scotland. Its purpose was to devise a scheme for the formation of a devolution settlement for Scotland. Suddenly the prospects for a Scottish Assembly seemed much brighter, despite the fact the SNP decided not to take part as they felt that independence would not be a constitutional option countenanced by the convention.

The convention produced its final report in 1995 and, with the return of a Labour government in 1997, devolution seemed assured. Later that year the Scottish people voted overwhelmingly in favour of establishing the devolved Scottish Parliament in a referendum, and the first elections for that body took place in 1999.

== See also ==
- Welsh Assembly (Wales Act 1978)
- Scottish Parliament
