= Gavin Vernon =

Scottish engineer and nationalist

Gavin Harold Russell Vernon (11 August 1926 – 19 March 2004) was a Scottish engineer who along with his accomplices, removed the Stone of Scone from Westminster Abbey in London on Christmas Day 1950 and took the Stone to Scotland.

== Background ==
Vernon was born in Kintore, Aberdeenshire, the son of a doctor and educated at Strathallan School in Perthshire, Scotland. After Strathallan, Vernon completed his national service with the Royal Signals serving in Malta, Palestine and Cyprus. He then attended the University of Glasgow where he studied electrical engineering. Whilst studying in Glasgow he became a member of the Scottish Covenant Association, a group which supported home rule for Scotland.

== Removal of the Stone of Scone ==
Whilst studying at the University of Glasgow, Gavin Vernon, was approached by a fellow student, Ian Hamilton, to participate in a daring plan to remove the Stone of Scone from Westminster Abbey in London and take it to Scotland, along with Kay Matheson and Alan Stuart. The heist was a success and set off one of the biggest manhunts in British history. The border between Scotland and England was closed for the first time in over four hundred years. All but one of the group, Ian Hamilton, admitted to their role in the raid. The authorities decided not to prosecute the students for fear it would politicise the incident.

The incident created considerable publicity in the United Kingdom and beyond. The four students became household names both at the time and to later generations. Vernon's name would become inextricably linked with the raid and amongst the devolution and nationalist movements in Scotland he gained iconic status. For the rest of his life he would be remembered for his role in the events of Christmas Day 1950. In 2008 the incident was made into a film called Stone of Destiny, where Vernon was played by Stephen McCole.

== Later life ==
In 1960 Vernon married Anne Fraser with whom he had one son in addition to her two sons from a previous marriage. In 1963 he emigrated with his family to Canada and initially found work on a potash mining project in Saskatchewan. Vernon worked on several engineering projects around the world in Vancouver, Czechoslovakia, the Netherlands, London, Saudi Arabia and Aberdeen before finally settling in West Vancouver. In Vancouver he became a consulting engineer and contributed to the establishment of The Western Canada Group of Chartered Engineers.

When the Stone of Scone was officially returned to Scotland in 1996 Gavin Vernon attended the ceremony in Edinburgh. On Christmas Eve 2000, the fiftieth anniversary of the event, Vernon returned to Westminster Abbey which was specially opened for him with the words: 'Welcome back, Mr Vernon'. In early 2004 Vernon was diagnosed with cancer, and died from it in March 2004.
