= Edward Faraday Odlum =

Canadian geologist

Edward Faraday Odlum (November 27, 1850 – May 4, 1935) was a Canadian geologist, educator and businessman. He studied the ethnography of the people of Australia and Northern Europe, and investigated the Stone of Scone. He was a believer in British Israelism.

== Biography ==
He was born at Tullamore, Ontario, on November 27, 1850. He attended the University of Toronto and graduated in 1883. He taught at Coburg Collegiate. He then became the principal of the Pembroke High School. He moved to Japan and became the principal of a Methodist College in Tokyo from 1886 to 1889.

He returned to Canada in 1889 and lived in Vancouver. Odlum may have installed the first public telephone in Vancouver and the first electric arc light. He was elected as an alderman twice, first in 1892. He visited the United Kingdom from 1903 to 1904 to promote migration to Canada. He ran for a seat in the British Columbia legislature but was defeated.

He died on May 4, 1935, in Vancouver, British Columbia, Canada.

== Stone of Scone ==
A series of requests were made by him to study the Coronation Stone, but all were denied.

== Legacy ==
Odlum was the father of soldier and diplomat Victor Wentworth Odlum. A street in Grandview, Odlum Drive, is named after Edward Odlum.
