= Kay Matheson =

Scottish political activist, teacher, and scholar

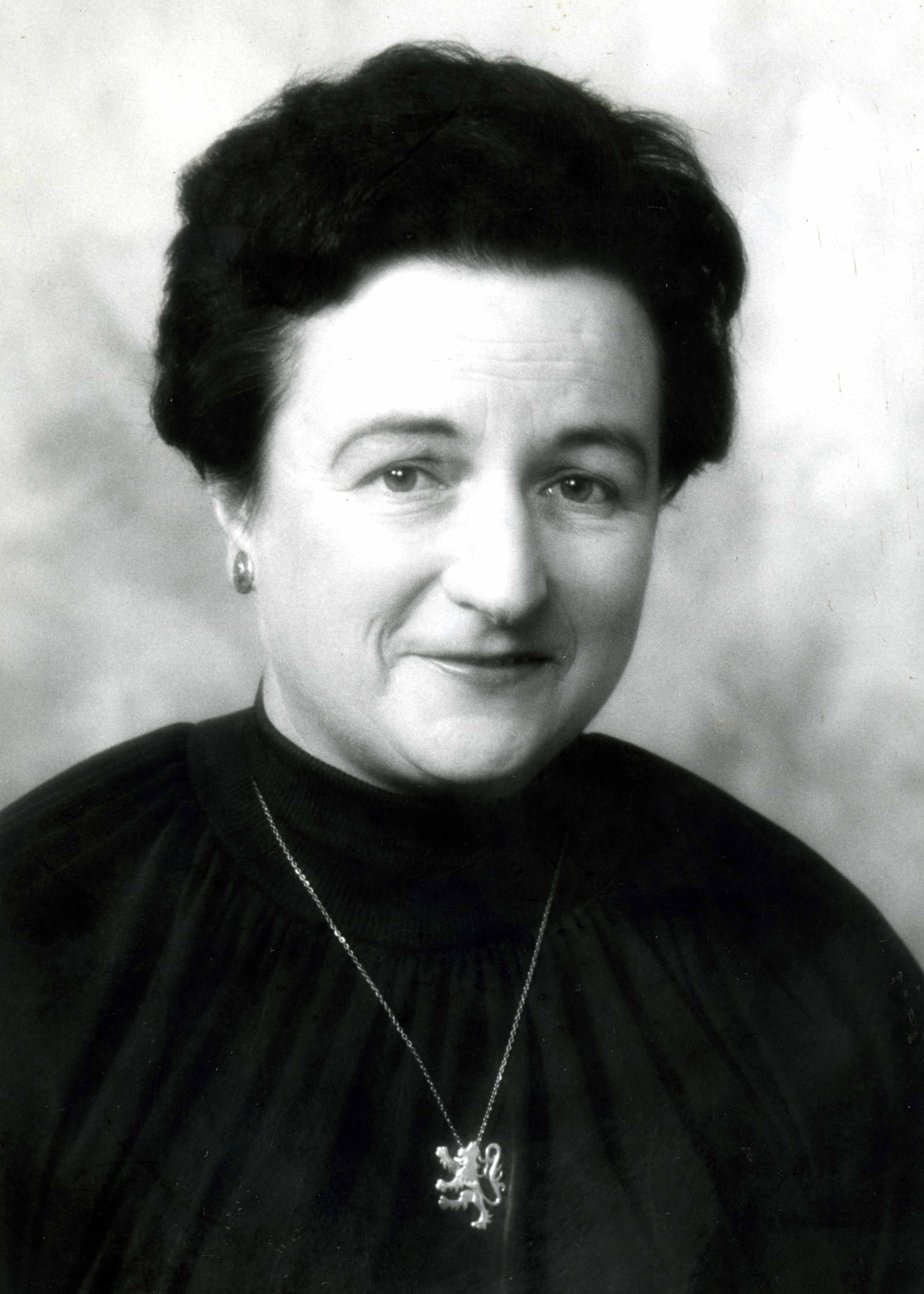
- Matheson in 1981
- Born: 7 December 1928; Inverasdale, Scotland
- Died: 6 July 2013 (aged 84); Aultbea, Scotland
- Education: University of Glasgow
- Occupations: Teacher, political activist, Gaelic scholar
- Known for: 1950 removal of the Stone of Scone

Kay Matheson (7 December 1928 – 6 July 2013) was a Scottish teacher, political activist, and Gaelic scholar. She was one of the four University of Glasgow students involved in the 1950 removal of the Stone of Scone.

== Life ==
Matheson was born in Inverasdale near Loch Ewe in 1928, to a crofting family. She attended the University of Glasgow, studying domestic science, and taught in both English and Gaelic. Following the Christmas Day raid she returned to Inverasdale to live with her mother, and teach locally. She taught home economics, Gaelic, and physical education at Achtercairn School in Gairloch, also taught at various primary schools in Wester Ross. She was involved with An Comunn Gàidhealach, an organisation that promotes the teaching and use of Gaelic- and in 1979 they made her an honorary vice-president. She ran against Charles Kennedy in the 1983 United Kingdom general election as an SNP candidate, and was an active member of the party. During the 1980s she participated in the Ceartas campaign to raise the profile of the Gaelic language.

== Christmas day raid ==
Matheson met Ian Hamilton, Gavin Vernon and Alan Stuart while studying in Glasgow, (all four were members of the Scottish Covenant Association), with whom she made the plan to bring back to Scotland the Stone of Destiny from Westminster Abbey. On Christmas Day 1950, they gained access to the Abbey and removed the stone to Scotland, following which action check points were put on roads, and the border between Scotland and England closed. Matheson broke two toes during the action, and was also the getaway driver. The stone having broken in two during the raid, Matheson took one piece, leaving it with a friend in England before collecting it at a later date. A description of her car was issued, however the stone was not found for four months. Police attended her family home to question her about the theft, at which point she lied, and told them that it was in a nearby peat bog. No charges were brought against either Matheson or her fellow students. She is quoted as having said "Our recovery, not theft, of the Stone informed our whole lives."

Matheson was 22 at the time of the raid, and was not named in initial reports following the incident; she later confirmed to a newspaper by phone that she had been involved.

In 1996, the Stone was returned to Scotland, in a ceremony at Edinburgh Castle at which Matheson was present. Her obituary states that she was the only one of the four to attend, though this is disputed in the obituary of Gavin Vernon.

== In popular culture ==
In 2000, BBC Alba broadcast a short film entitled An Ceasnachadh: Interrogation of a Highland Lass, about the police's interrogation of Matheson. Matheson's younger self was portrayed by Kathleen MacInnes, and her older self by Dolina MacLennan. In the 2008 film Stone of Destiny she was played by Kate Mara.

== Death ==
Matheson never married, and died at the age of 84, in Aultbea's Isle View Nursing Home, where she had lived for 20 years, and cared for by a relative, and former pupils. In the wake of her death, she was celebrated as a key figure in modern Scottish Nationalism, by Angus MacNeil (MP) as a "feisty and funny woman", and by Charles Kennedy, with whom she became friends after standing against him in 1983, as an "inspirational force."
