= John MacCormick =

Scottish lawyer (1904–1961)

John MacDonald MacCormick (20 November 1904 – 13 October 1961) was a Scottish lawyer, Scottish nationalist politician and advocate of Home Rule in Scotland.

== Early life ==
MacCormick was born in Pollokshields, Glasgow, in 1904. His father was Donald MacCormick, a sea captain who was from the Isle of Mull. His mother was the first district nurse in the Western Isles. MacCormick was educated at Woodside School, and studied law at the University of Glasgow (1923–1928). He became involved in politics while at university, and joined the Glasgow University Labour Club and the Independent Labour Party in 1923. In September 1927 MacCormick left the ILP and formed the Glasgow University Scottish Nationalist Association (GUSNA), which was designed to promote Scottish culture and nationalism and self-government. The association was sufficiently neutral to act as the honest broker between the various nationalist organisations which would merge to form the National Party of Scotland (NPS) in April 1928. MacCormick was a talented speaker and organiser, and served as the national secretary of the NPS. MacCormick was often known by his nickname "King John", which he said came from a heckle during a debate he was participating in when upon a question from the floor whether a devolved Scotland would retain the monarchy, or would be a republic, someone interjected and said: "no, it will be a kingdom and John MacCormick will be our king."

The failure of the NPS to make an electoral breakthrough led him to question current tactics and he concluded that the party's fundamentalist wing was frightening away potential support because of its support for republicanism and independence. In consequence, MacCormick initiated a campaign to redefine the policy of the NPS, to make it more moderate and to tone down demands for independence. He first stood for Parliament as an NPS candidate at the 1929 general election, when he came third in Glasgow Camlachie, with 1,646 votes. He also stood at Inverness at the 1931 general election.

== SNP ==
In 1932, MacCormick began to make overtures to the right-wing Scottish Party, believing that, as the Scottish Party included a number of members of the Scottish 'establishment', their conversion to the cause of home rule would enhance the credibility of the nationalists. To secure an accommodation, MacCormick purged the NPS of radical elements, and moved the policy of the NPS towards that of the Scottish Party. His endeavours paid dividends, and in 1934 the two parties merged to form the Scottish National Party (SNP). MacCormick himself was not a dogmatic politician, and described himself as a radical, by which he meant a form of centrist liberal. His response to the failure of the SNP to make an electoral impact in the mid-1930s was to search for alternative strategies. He considered the basic problem to be that, although many people in Scotland favoured home rule, they were not, on the whole, willing to put the issue above conventional party loyalties. The solution, MacCormick argued, was to make the other parties take home rule seriously, and to demonstrate widespread support for the cause. In 1939 he launched the idea of a Scottish national convention, which would bring together all sections of Scottish society and all shades of Scottish political opinion in favour of home rule. He had made contact with both the Labour and Liberal parties, and although the first meeting, scheduled for September 1939, was cancelled because of the outbreak of World War II, MacCormick pushed negotiations throughout the war.

As a leading figure in the SNP, MacCormick came under increasing attack from the rank and file members for his failure to maintain party structure and organisation. He considered that his preferred strategy of co-operation with other organisations meant that there was little need for the SNP to function as a mainstream political party. He endeavoured to present an acceptable face of Scottish nationalism, and did much to reverse the party's official anti-conscription policy following the outbreak of the Second World War. MacCormick stood as an SNP candidate for Inverness at the 1935 general election and at the 1937 Glasgow Hillhead by-election.

He resigned from the party in 1942 following his failure to persuade the party to adopt a devolutionist stance rather than supporting all out Scottish independence and due to the victory of Douglas Young over his favoured candidate, William Power, for the leadership of the SNP. Along with a number of dissatisfied delegates to that year's SNP conference, he established the Scottish Convention to campaign for home rule for Scotland and later formed the Scottish Covenant Association.

== Scottish Convention, Scottish Covenant and later years ==
MacCormick took the decision to join the Liberal Party as he viewed them as being the party most closely allied to his devolutionist ambitions for Scotland. He stood as the Liberal candidate for Inverness at the 1945 general election.

The Scottish Convention succeeded in 1947 in setting up an assembly along the lines planned in 1939. In 1951, MacCormick formed the Scottish Covenant Association, a non-partisan political organisation which campaigned to secure the establishment of a devolved Scottish Assembly. This covenant was hugely successful in securing support from across the political spectrum, as well as in capturing the Scottish public's imagination (over 2 million signed a petition demanding the convocation of an Assembly). In 1948, he stood as an independent candidate at the Paisley by-election, with what he erroneously believed to be Liberal and Conservative support, and lost. His failure discredited claims as to the popularity of home rule, and further served to reinforce notions that the Scottish Convention was an anti-Labour organisation. MacCormick's failure left the SNP with a monopoly of the cause of home rule.

MacCormick was elected Rector of the University of Glasgow in October 1950. He served as Rector until 1953. He was awarded an honorary Doctorate of Laws by the university in 1951. This association with GUSNA also saw the formation of a political friendship with a then young law student at Glasgow University, Ian Hamilton, who had run his campaign to be elected rector. MacCormick was involved, along with Hamilton, in the removal of the Stone of Destiny from Westminster Abbey on Christmas Day 1950 and its return to Arbroath Abbey. He also mounted a legal challenge, MacCormick v. Lord Advocate, over the right of Queen Elizabeth using the title Queen Elizabeth II, on grounds that there had been no previous Scottish Queen Elizabeth.

In 1955 MacCormick had a book detailing his activities in the home rule movement published, entitled The Flag in the Wind. His last attempt to enter parliament came at the 1959 General Election, when he stood for the Liberal Party at Roxburgh, Selkirk and Peebles, again finishing second.

In the film Stone of Destiny MacCormick is played by Robert Carlyle.

== Personal life ==
MacCormick married Margaret Isobel Miller in 1939, with whom he had two sons and two daughters. Their elder son, Iain (1939–2014), served as SNP Member of Parliament for Argyll from 1974 till 1979 (and was a founder member of the Social Democratic Party. Their second son, Neil (1941–2009) was regius professor of Public Law and Vice-Principal of the University of Edinburgh, and served as an SNP Member of the European Parliament from 1999 to 2004. He was also the uncle of the journalist and broadcaster Donald MacCormick.

MacCormick died on 13 October 1961. His funeral was held in the chapel of the University of Glasgow.

Party political offices
Preceded by New position	National Secretary of the Scottish National Party; 1934–1942	Succeeded by Robert McIntyre
Academic offices
Preceded by Walter Elliot	Rector of the University of Glasgow; 1950–1953	Succeeded by Tom Honeyman
