= Coronation Chair =

Wooden chair used in British coronations

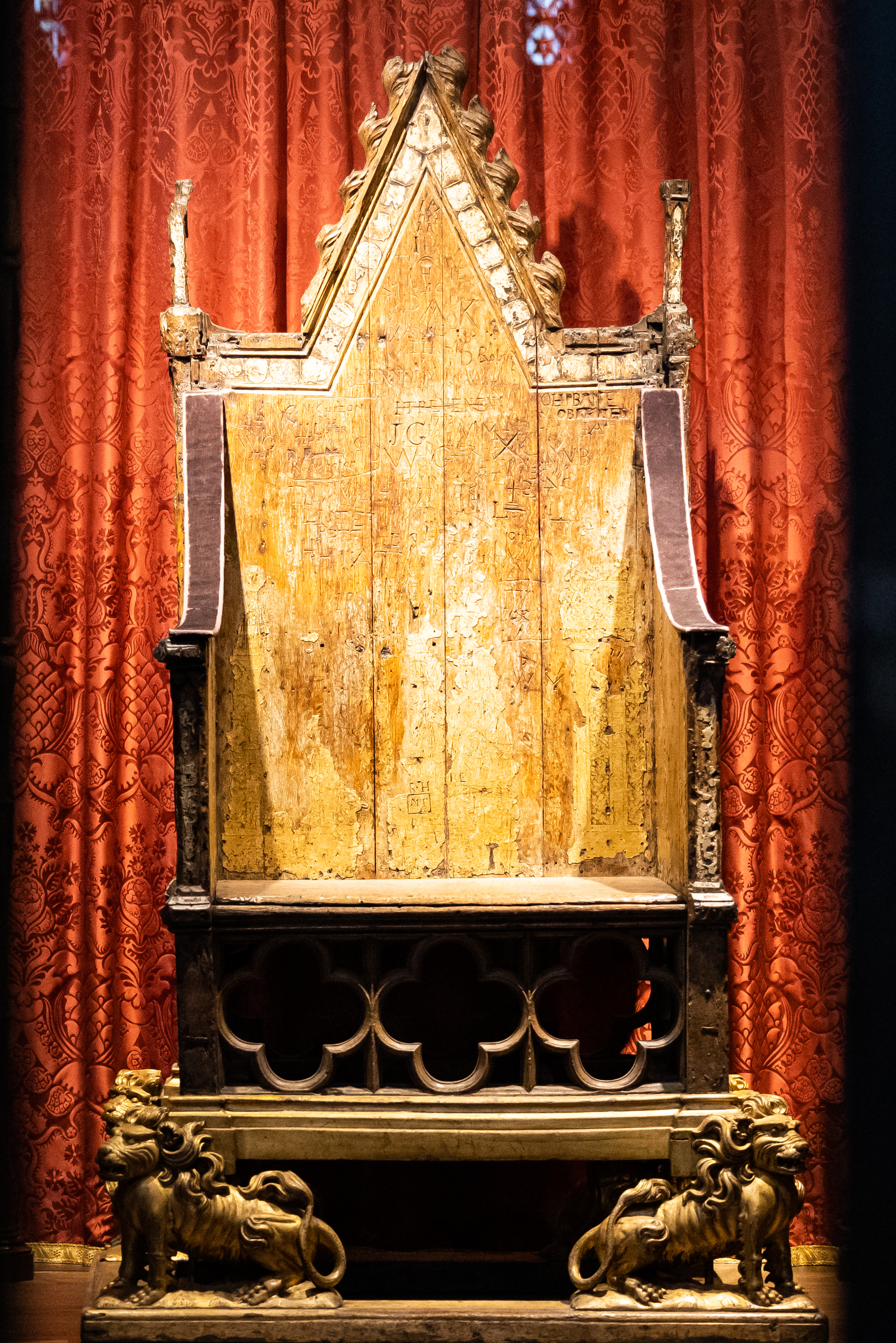
The chair in 2023 without the Stone of Scone, which was returned to Scotland in 1996

The Coronation Chair, also known as St Edward's Chair or King Edward's Chair, is an ancient wooden chair (Note: Technically, the Coronation Chair is not a throne (seat of state occupied by the sovereign on state occasions).) that is used by British monarchs when they are invested with regalia and crowned at their coronation. The chair was commissioned in 1296 by King Edward I of England to house the Stone of Scone, the symbol of royal authority in Scotland. Since 1308, it has been used at every coronation of English and British Monarchs at Westminster Abbey. The chair was named after Edward the Confessor, and is currently kept in St George's Chapel at Westminster Abbey, London. It was last used by King Charles III at his coronation in 2023.

== History ==
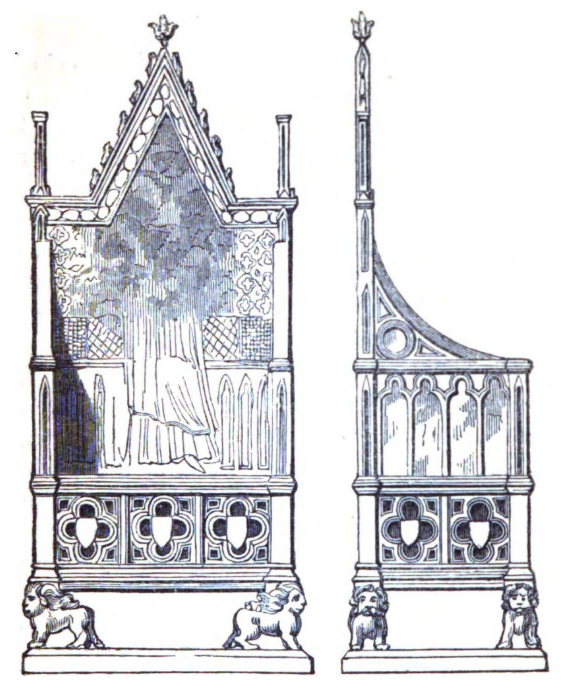
A sketch of the chair published in 1838

King Edward I of England seized the Stone of Scone, the traditional coronation seat of the Scottish kings, from Scone Abbey in Perthshire in 1296. Edward took the Stone to England and commissioned the Coronation Chair to hold it. The high-backed, Gothic-style armchair was carved from oak at some point between the summer of 1297 and March 1300 by the carpenter Walter of Durham. At first, the king ordered the chair to be made of bronze, but he changed his mind and decided it should be made of timber. It was originally covered in gilding and coloured glass, much of which has now been lost. The chair is the oldest dated piece of English furniture made by a known artist. Although it was not originally intended to be a coronation chair, it began to be associated with coronations of English monarchs at some point in the 14th century, and the first coronation where it was definitely used was that of Henry IV in 1399. Monarchs used to sit on the Stone of Scone itself until a wooden platform was added to the chair in the 17th century.

When William III and Mary II became joint monarchs in 1689, they required two coronation chairs for the ceremony. William III used the original 13th-century chair, while a second chair was made for Mary II, which still resides in the abbey's collections.

Gilded lions added in the 16th century form the legs to the chair; they were all replaced in 1727. One of the four lions was given a new head for the coronation of George IV in 1821. The chair itself was originally gilded, painted and inlaid with glass mosaics, traces of which are visible upon inspection of the chair, especially on the back where outlines of foliage, birds and animals survive. A lost image of a king, maybe Edward the Confessor or Edward I, with his feet resting on a lion was also painted on the back. Today, its appearance is of aged and brittle wood.

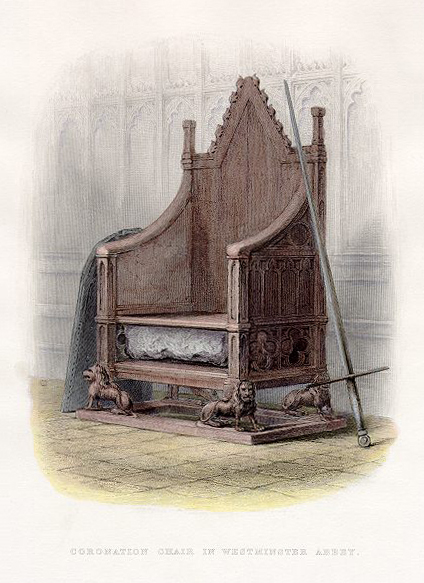
The Stone of Scone in the Coronation Chair at Westminster Abbey, 1859

In the 18th century, tourists could sit on the chair for a small payment to one of the vergers. Tourists, choirboys and boys of Westminster School carved their initials, names and other graffiti into the chair, and the corner posts have been acutely damaged by souvenir hunters. Nails have often been driven into the wood to attach fabric for coronations, and in preparation for Queen Victoria's Golden Jubilee, the chair was covered with a coating of brown paint. Sir Gilbert Scott, the Gothic revival architect and antiquary, described the chair as "a magnificent piece of decoration, but sadly mutilated".

At 5:40 pm on 11 June 1914, the chair was the object of a bomb attack thought to have been organised by the Suffragettes. A corner of the chair was broken off in the explosion. Although it was strong enough to shake the abbey walls and loud enough to be heard from inside the Houses of Parliament, none of the 70 people in the abbey at the time was injured, and the Coronation Chair was faithfully restored.

Over the eight centuries of its existence, the chair has only been removed from Westminster Abbey twice. The first time was for the ceremony in Westminster Hall when Oliver Cromwell was inducted as Lord Protector of the Commonwealth of England. The second was during the Second World War when, concerned about the risk of it being damaged or destroyed by German air raids, it was moved out of London. On 24 August 1939, the Stone of Scone was moved out of the way and the chair was loaded on a truck and, with two detectives accompanying the driver, it was driven to Gloucester Cathedral where the Dean and the Cathedral Architect signed for its receipt. The next day, five carpenters arrived to shore up the roof of a vaulted recess in the cathedral's crypt with timber supports. Once they had finished their work, the chair was moved into the recess. As it also provided the best protected location, the cathedral's 13th-century bog-oak effigy of Robert Curthose was placed on the chair. Sandbags were then used to seal off the recess. The chair remained there for the duration of the war. Meanwhile the chair used for the coronation of Mary II was relocated from Westminster Abbey to Winchester Cathedral for safekeeping.

On Christmas Day 1950, Scottish nationalists broke into Westminster Abbey and stole the Stone of Scone, damaging the stone. It was recovered in time for Queen Elizabeth II's coronation in 1953.

In 1996, the stone was returned to Scotland (first at Edinburgh Castle, and since 2024 at Perth Museum) on the proviso that it be returned to England for use at coronations, as happened for the coronation of King Charles III in 2023. In 1997, the year after the removal of the stone, the chair was removed from its traditional home in the Chapel of St Edward the Confessor and placed by the tomb of King Henry V. In 2010 the chair was moved to a chapel at the back of the Nave for cleaning, where it has since remained (when not in use).

The Coronation Chair is now highly protected, and leaves its secure location—behind glass on a plinth in St George's Chapel in the nave—only when it is carried into the theatre of coronation near the High Altar of the abbey. Between 2010 and 2012, the chair was cleaned and restored by a team of experts in full view of the public at the abbey. In early 2023, a further programme of restoration and conservation was undertaken in preparation for the coronation of Charles III and Camilla; on 6 May 2023, the stone having been reunited with the chair for the occasion, the King was seated on it for his anointing, investiture and crowning.

== Other chairs used at the coronation ==
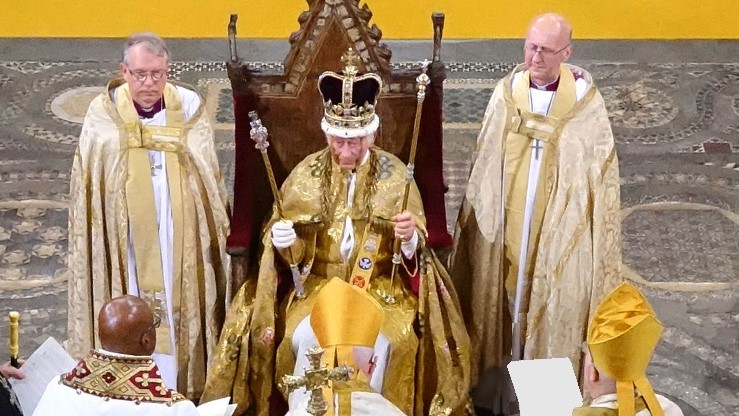
The Coronation Chair at the Coronation of Charles III and Camilla in 2023

Other chairs are used by the monarch (and consort) for different parts of the coronation ceremony. Chairs of Estate for the sovereign and consort are placed on the south side of the sanctuary: these are used during the first part of the service, prior to the sovereign's anointing and crowning with St Edward's Crown. Later, for the enthronement (and the homage which follows it), the monarch is seated not in the Coronation Chair, but in a separate Throne on a dais positioned in the middle of the crossing. On occasions when the wife of a king—a queen consort—is crowned, a similar throne is provided for her so that she can be seated next to the king but at a lower level.

Unlike the Coronation Chair, these other chairs and thrones have tended to be made new for each coronation. For the coronation of King Charles III and Queen Camilla, however, older chairs were reconditioned:

- The Chairs of Estate had originally been made in 1953 on the occasion of the Coronation of Elizabeth II (since which time they had stood on the dais in the Throne Room in Buckingham Palace).
- The Thrones had originally been made for the Coronation of King George VI and Queen Elizabeth in 1937.

All four were restored and given new heraldic embroidery, as appropriate, prior to the coronation in May 2023.

Afterwards, the Chairs of Estate were returned to the dais in the Throne Room of Buckingham Palace. This room also contains other chairs from past coronations, including:

- Queen Victoria's coronation Throne of 1837
- The Thrones used at the coronation of George V and Mary (1911)
- The Chairs of Estate from the coronation of George VI and Elizabeth (1937)

The 1953 Throne from the coronation of Elizabeth II is kept in the Garter Throne Room of Windsor Castle; while the 1902 Thrones from the coronation of King Edward VII and Queen Alexandra are on the dais in the Ballroom at Buckingham Palace. A pair of Chairs of Estate (made for the 1902 coronation), which are usually kept in the Music Room at Buckingham Palace, have in recent years been employed when the monarch has addressed both Houses of Parliament in Westminster Hall.

== See also ==
- Chair of St Peter
- List of chairs
- Westminster Stone theory

== Sources ==
- Rodwell, Warwick (2013). The Coronation Chair and Stone of Scone: History, Archaeology and Conservation. Oxbow Books. ISBN 978-1-78297-152-8.
