= The Four Winds of Love =

Series of novels by Compton Mackenzie (published 1937–1945)

The Four Winds of Love is the overall title for a series of six novels written by Compton Mackenzie, The East Wind of Love (1937), The South Wind of Love (1938), The West Wind of Love (1940), West to North (1942), The North Wind of Love, Book 1 (1944) and The North Wind of Love, Book 2 (1945), which taken together constitute a major fictional chronicle of the first forty years of the twentieth century. The main protagonist of the hexalogy is the semi-autobiographical character of John Ogilvie.

== Sources ==
- Linklater, Andro Compton Mackenzie: A Life The Hogarth Press (1992, London)
