= Neil MacCormick =

Scottish legal philosopher and politician

Sir Neil MacCormick QC (Hon.) FRSE FBA
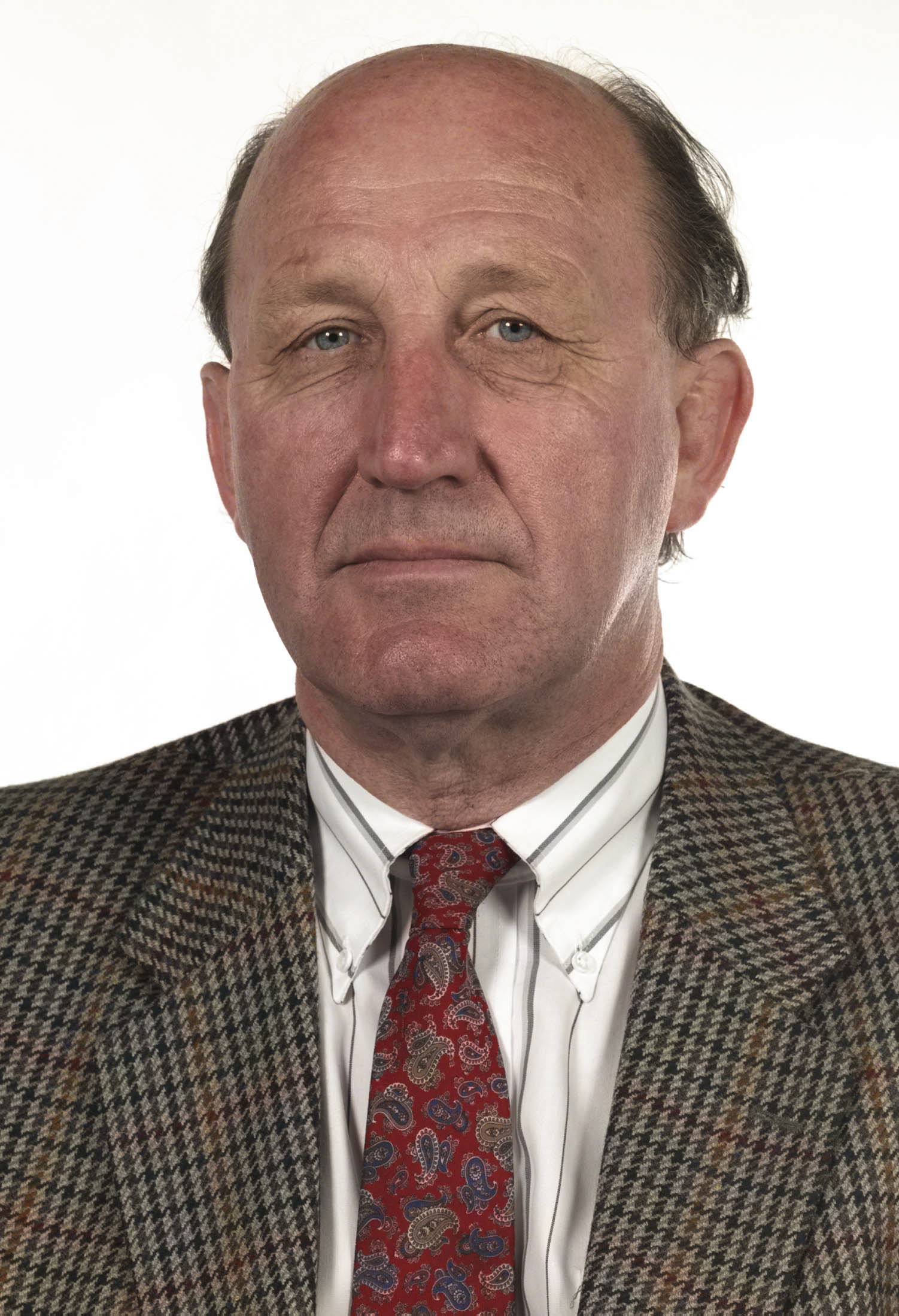

Member of the European Parliament for Scotland
- In office 10 June 1999 – 10 June 2004
- Preceded by: Position established
- Succeeded by: Alyn Smith

Personal details
- Born: Donald Neil MacCormick; 27 May 1941 Glasgow, Scotland
- Died: 5 April 2009 (aged 67) Edinburgh, Scotland
- Party: Scottish National Party
- Spouse(s): Caroline Rona Barr; Flora Margaret Britain (née Milne)
- Relations: John MacCormick (father); Iain MacCormick (brother)
- Children: 3 daughters
- Education: University of Glasgow; Balliol College, Oxford

Sir Donald Neil MacCormick QC (Hon.) FRSE FBA (27 May 1941 – 5 April 2009) was a Scottish legal philosopher and politician. He was Regius Professor of Public Law and the Law of Nature and Nations at the University of Edinburgh from 1972 until 2008. He was a Member of the European Parliament 1999–2004, member of the Convention on the Future of Europe, and officer of the Scottish National Party.

== Life and academic career ==
MacCormick was born in Glasgow on 27 May 1941, the son of one of the SNP's founders, John MacCormick. He was educated at the High School of Glasgow. He graduated MA in philosophy and English literature at the University of Glasgow, before benefiting from a Snell Exhibition and taking the BA in jurisprudence at Balliol College, Oxford. At Oxford, MacCormick came under the influence of H. L. A. Hart, and developed an interest in legal philosophy. In 1982 he was awarded the research degree of LLD by the University of Edinburgh.

MacCormick was a lecturer in jurisprudence at the School of Law, University of Dundee (which was attached to University of St Andrews at that time) from 1965 to 1967. Following this, he was a fellow and tutor in jurisprudence, Balliol College, Oxford 1968–1972, and thereafter held the Regius Chair of Public Law and the Law of Nature and Nations at the University of Edinburgh. He was also Leverhulme Research Professor at Edinburgh from 1997 to 1999, and from 2004 to 2008. In addition, he held the position of Dean of Law Faculty between 1973 and 1976, and was sometime Provost of the Faculty Group of Law and Social Science, and Vice-Principal for International Affairs.

MacCormick retired from the Regius Chair on 1 February 2008 after completing 36 years as professor (and later senior professor) at the University of Edinburgh. He was accorded with the honour of a series of lectures in his name by the university's School of Law and delivered the School of Law's opening Tercentenary Lecture, introduced by former Lord President Lord Cullen, on 18 January 2007. He gave his final lecture as Regius Professor, entitled 'Just Law', on Monday 28 January 2008. He continued thereafter in his role as President of the International Association for Philosophy of Law and Social Philosophy.

He was president of the International Association for Philosophy of Law and Social Philosophy.

MacCormick was a member of the Broadcasting Council for Scotland, of the Economic and Social Research Council, of the Research Council of the European University Institute, and of the European Science Foundation, as well as of various government departmental committees inquiring into matters of public concern.

== Political career ==
MacCormick stood for the SNP in the Edinburgh Pentlands constituency in 1983 and 1987, coming in fourth place both times. He stood for Argyll and Bute in 1997 and came second.

In September 1998 he was selected by delegates at the SNP's conference as a candidate for the 1999 European Parliament elections. He was elected a Member of the European Parliament, taking a leave of absence from the University of Edinburgh. MacCormick was a member of the Convention on the Future of Europe from 2002 to 2003, drafting the proposed Constitutional Treaty for the European Union. He was voted Scottish Euro MP of the Year in 2001, 2002 and 2003 at the Scottish Politician of the Year Awards, and retired from elected office in 2004 to complete his Leverhulme Research Professorship at Edinburgh.

He was elected vice president of the SNP in 1999 and remained in the position until 2004. In 2007 MacCormick was appointed as a special advisor on Europe to the newly elected SNP-led Scottish Government.

== Academic works ==
MacCormick wrote numerous journal articles and books, concentrating both on law in a European context and the philosophy of law. Works such as Legal Reasoning and Legal Theory (1978), H. L. A. Hart (1981), Legal Right and Social Democracy: Essays in Legal and Political Philosophy (1984), An Institutional Theory of Law: New Approaches to Legal Positivism (with O. Weinberger) (1986), Questioning Sovereignty: Law, State, and Nation in the European Commonwealth (1999), Rhetoric and The Rule of Law (2005) and Institutions of Law (2007) all convey his particular brand of legal philosophy. Legal Reasoning and Legal Theory answers many of the Dworkinian critiques of the Hartian conception of law, and it is seen by some as showing a middle ground between the two. Questioning Sovereignty: Law, State, and Nation in the European Commonwealth (1999) examines the transformation of sovereignty as consequence of constitutional pluralism in the European Union. His final book was Practical Reason in Law and Morality (2008).

== Honours and awards ==
In 1999, MacCormick was appointed Queen's Counsel 'honoris causa', and was knighted in the Queen's Birthday Honours in 2001 in recognition of services to scholarship in Law. In 2004 he was a recipient of the Royal Society of Edinburgh's Royal Gold Medal for Outstanding Achievement. He was an honorary fellow of Balliol College, Oxford and the recipient of honorary degrees from Queen's University (Canada), Uppsala University (Sweden), University of Macerata (Italy) and Saarland University (Germany), as well as from the University of Glasgow, Queen Margaret University and the University of Edinburgh.

== Illness and death ==
Just after retiring from his chair at the University of Edinburgh in 2008, MacCormick was diagnosed with inoperable cancer. He died on 5 April 2009.

== Podcast recording ==
Donald Neil MacCormick, Scottish Politics Today

- Scottish Politics Today audio recording / podcast. Recorded on 12 October 2005, in the office of Neil MacCormick at the University of Edinburgh.
