= Arbroath Abbey =

Former Benedictine Abbey in Scotland

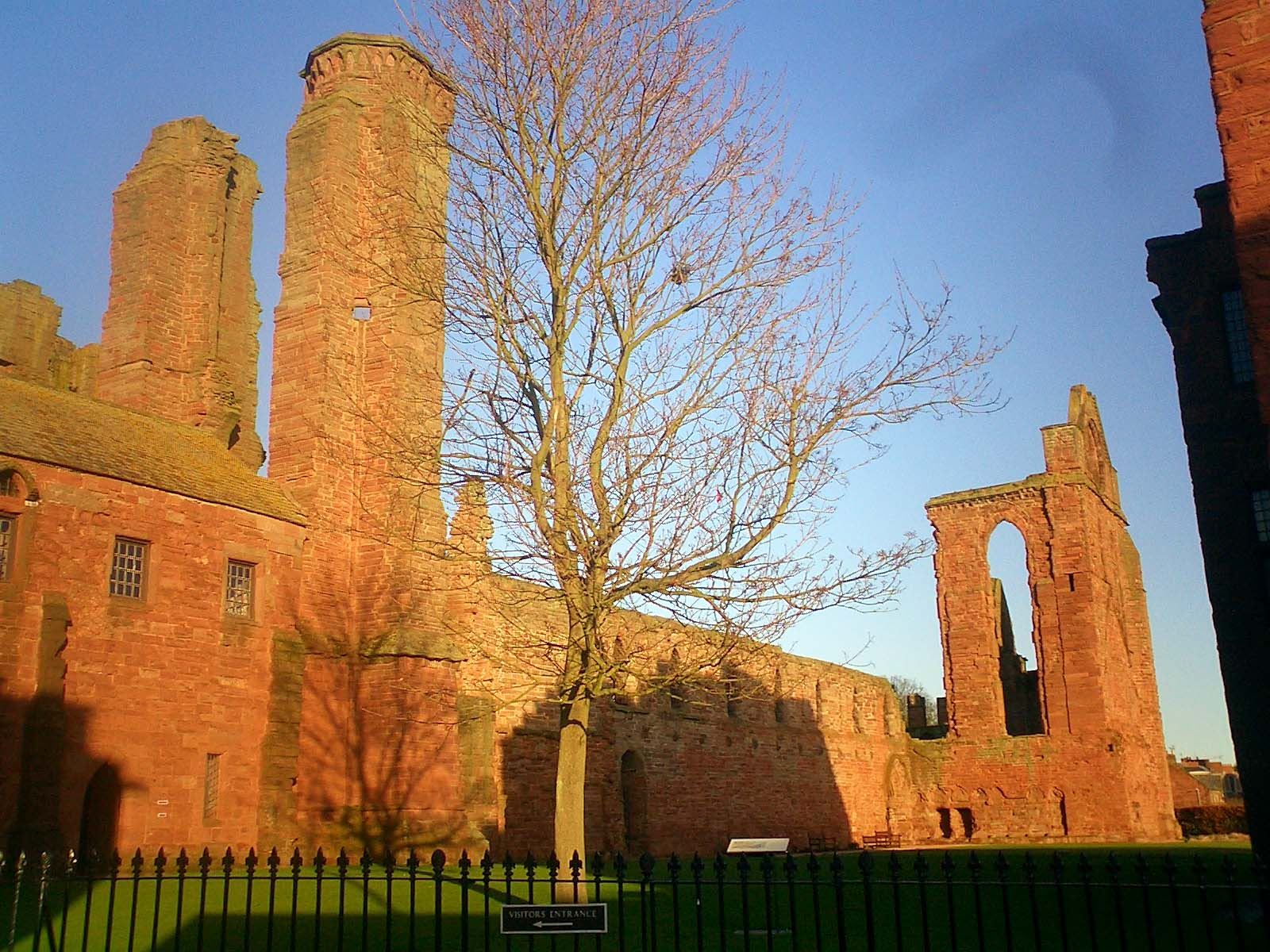
- Interactive map of Arbroath Abbey

Monastery information
- Full name: Abbey of St. Thomas
- Order: Tironensian
- Established: 1178
- Disestablished: 1560
- Mother house: Kelso Abbey
- Dedication: St. Thomas Becket
- Consecrated: 1197
- Archdiocese: St Andrews

People
- Founder: King William the Lion
- Important associated figures: David Beaton

Architecture
- Completed date: 1223

Site
- Coordinates: 56°33′45″N 2°34′56″W

Arbroath Abbey, in the Scottish town of Arbroath, was founded in 1178 by King William the Lion for a group of Tironensian Benedictine monks from Kelso Abbey. It was consecrated in 1197 with a dedication to the deceased Saint Thomas Becket, whom the king had met at the English court. It was William's only personal foundation — he was buried before the high altar of the church in 1214.

The last Abbot was Cardinal David Beaton, who in 1522 succeeded his uncle James to become Archbishop of St Andrews. The Abbey is cared for by Historic Environment Scotland and is open to the public throughout the year (entrance charge). The distinctive red sandstone ruins stand at the top of the High Street in Arbroath.

== History ==
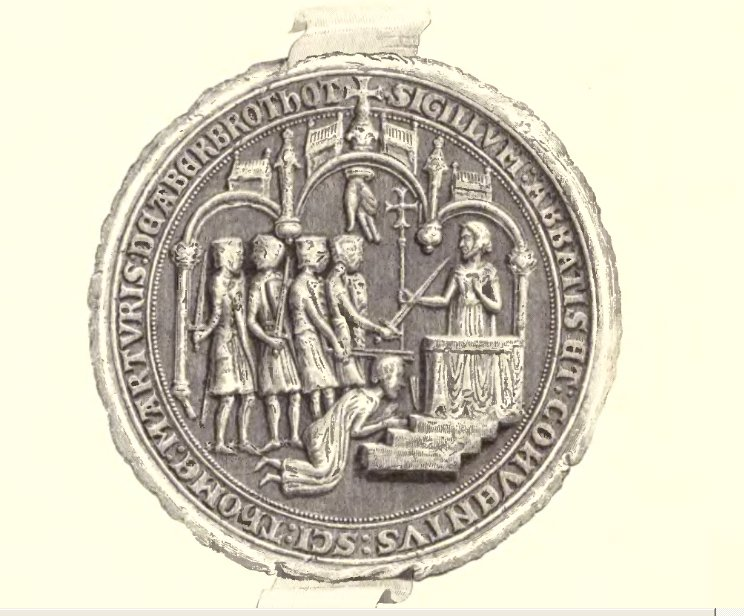
Abbey's seal, depicting the murder of St Thomas

King William gave the Abbey independence from its founding abbey, Kelso Abbey, and endowed it generously, including income from 24 parishes, land in every royal burgh and more. The Abbey's monks were allowed to run a market and build a harbour. Humphrey de Berkeley, Laird of Gartley, granted the monks and their tenants free access to his wood at Balfieth in the Mearns for building and fuel needs, supplemented by rights to cut peat for fuel. The abbey's charcoal burners had seasonal access to woodland around Edzell. King John of England gave the Abbey permission to buy and sell goods anywhere in England (except London) toll-free.

The Abbey, which was the richest in Scotland, is most famous for its association with the 1320 Declaration of Scottish Independence believed to have been drafted by Abbot Bernard, who was the Chancellor of Scotland under King Robert I.

James V stayed at the abbey for four days in July 1529. The Abbey fell into ruin after the Reformation. From 1590 onward, its stones were raided for buildings in the town of Arbroath. This continued until 1815 when steps were taken to preserve the remaining ruins.

On Christmas Day 1950, the Stone of Destiny went missing from Westminster Abbey. On 11 April 1951 the stone was found lying on the site of the Abbey's altar.

Since 1947, a major historical re-enactment commemorating the Declaration's signing has been held within the roofless remains of the Abbey church. The celebration is run by the local Arbroath Abbey Pageant Society, and tells the story of the events which led up to the signing. This is not an annual event. However, a special event to mark the signing is held every year on the 6th of April and involves a street procession and short piece of street theatre.

In 2005 The Arbroath Abbey campaign was launched. The campaign seeks to gain World Heritage Status for the iconic Angus landmark that was the birthplace of one of Scotland's most significant document, The Declaration of Arbroath. Campaigners believe that the Abbey's historical pronouncement makes it a prime candidate to achieve World Heritage Status. MSP Alex Johnstone wrote "Clearly, the Declaration of Arbroath is a literary work of outstanding universal significance by any stretch of the imagination" In 2008, the Campaign Group Chairman, Councillor Jim Millar launched a public petition to reinforce the bid explaining "We're simply asking people to, local people especially, to sign up to the campaign to have the Declaration of Arbroath and Arbroath Abbey recognised by the United Nations. Essentially we need local people to sign up to this campaign simply because the United Nations demand it."

== Architectural description ==
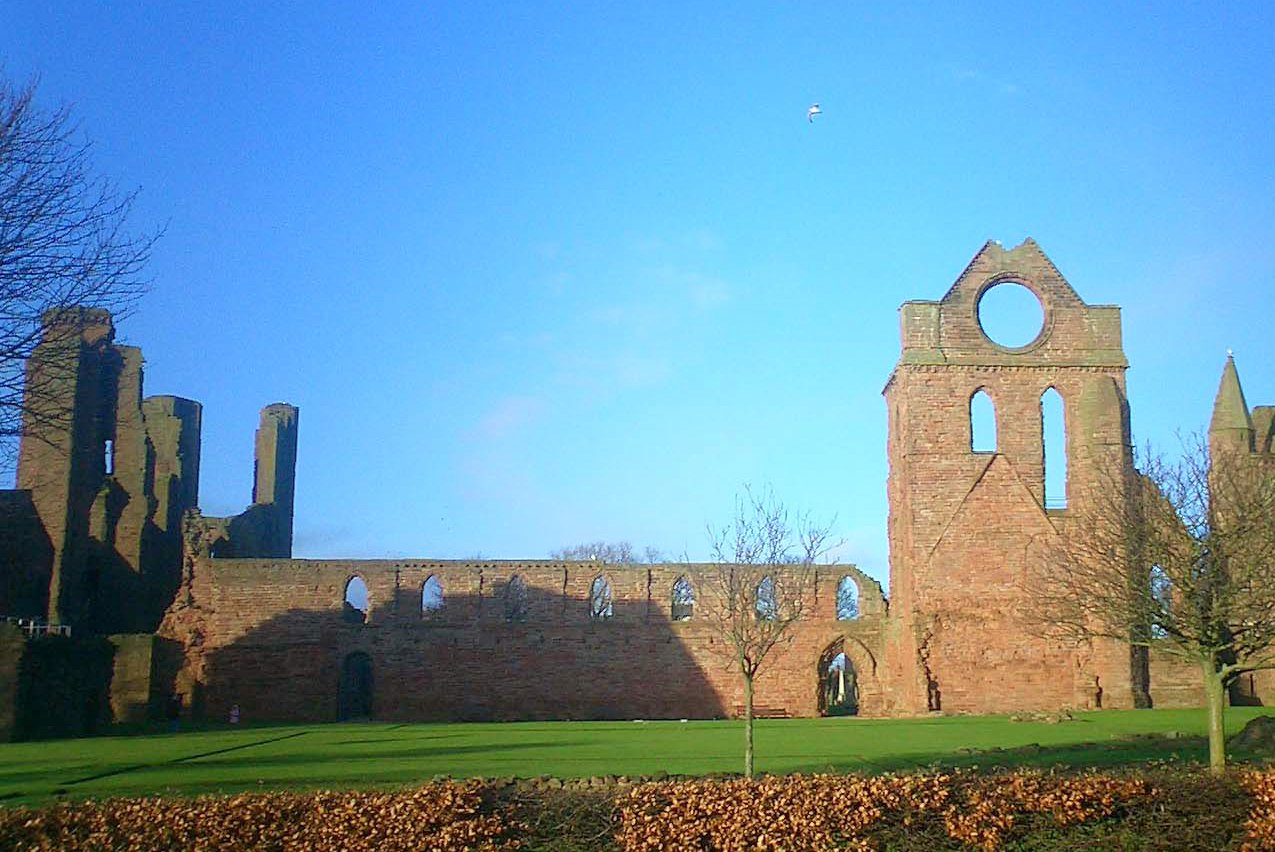
Arbroath Abbey, showing The Round 'O'

The Abbey was built over some sixty years using local red sandstone, but gives the impression of a single coherent, mainly 'Early English' architectural design, though the round-arched processional doorway in the western front looks back to late Norman or transitional work. The triforium (open arcade) above the door is unique in Scottish medieval architecture. It is flanked by twin towers decorated with blind arcading. The cruciform church measured 276 feet (84 m) long by 160 feet (49 m) wide. What remains of it today are the sacristy, added by Abbot Paniter in the 15th century, the southern transept, which features Scotland's largest lancet windows, part of the choir and presbytery, the southern half of the nave, parts of the western towers and the western doorway. The church originally had a central tower and (probably) a spire. These would once have been visible from many miles over the surrounding countryside, and no doubt once acted as a sea mark for ships. The soft sandstone of the walls was originally protected by plaster internally and render externally. These coatings are long gone and much of the architectural detail is sadly eroded, though detached fragments found in the ruins during consolidation give an impression of the original refined, rather austere, architectural effect.

The distinctive round window high in the south transept was originally lit up at night as a beacon for mariners. It is known locally as the 'Round O', and from this tradition inhabitants of Arbroath are colloquially known as 'Reid Lichties' (Scots reid = red).

Little remains of the claustral buildings of the Abbey except for the impressive gatehouse, which stretches between the south-west corner of the church and a defensive tower on the High Street, and the still complete Abbot's House, a building of the 13th, 15th and 16th centuries, which is the best preserved of its type in Scotland.

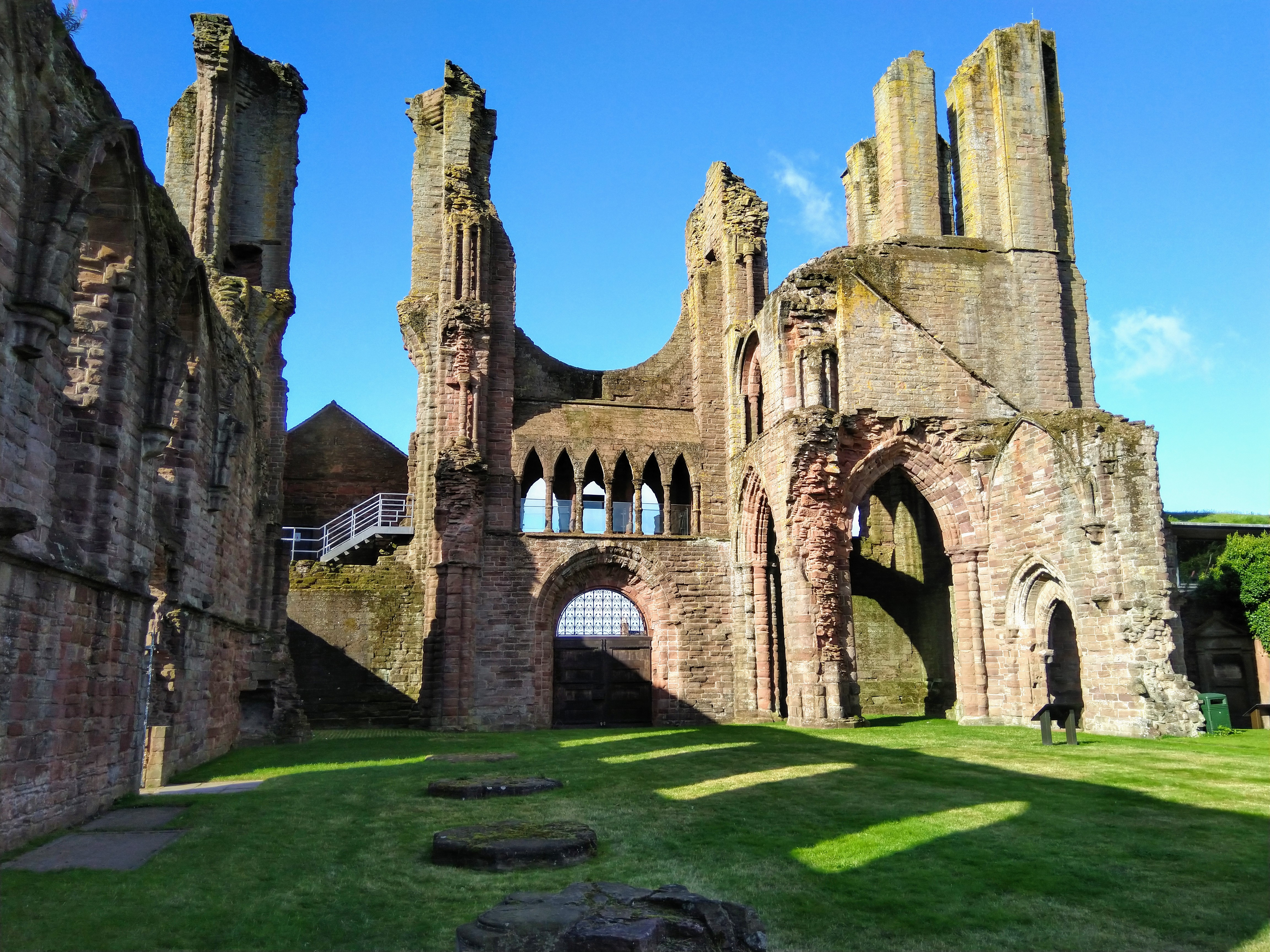
The nave of Arbroath Abbey, as observed from the west

In the summer of 2001, a new visitors' centre was opened to the public beside the Abbey's west front. This red sandstone-clad building, with its distinctive 'wave-shaped' organic roof, planted with sedum, houses displays on the history of the Abbey and some of the best surviving stonework and other relics. The upper storey features a scale model of the Abbey complex, a computer-generated 'fly-through' reconstruction of the church as it was when complete, and a viewing gallery with excellent views of the ruins. The centre won the 2002 Angus Design Award. An archaeological investigation of the site of the visitors' centre before building started revealed the foundations of the medieval precinct wall, with a gateway, and stonework discarded during manufacture, showing that the area was the site of the masons' yard while the Abbey was being built.

== See also ==
- Abbot of Arbroath, for a list of abbots and commendators
- 1950 removal of the Stone of Scone
