= Dundee City Council elections =

Local government elections in Dundee, Scotland

Dundee City Council in Scotland holds elections every five years, previously holding them every four years from its creation as a single-tier authority in 1995 to 2007.

== Council elections ==
=== As a district council ===
Year	SNP	Labour	Liberal (Note: SDP–Liberal Alliance from 1981 to 1988, Liberal Democrats from 1988.)	Conservative	Residents Association	Independent
1974	0	22	0	18	0	3 (Note: Includes 1 Independent Labour.)
1977	0	20	21	0	1	2
1980 (Note: New ward boundaries.)	0	25	0	17	1	1 (Note: Independent Conservative.)
1984	2	25	2	15	0	0
1988	4	30	0	10	0	0
1992	6	26	0	12	0	0

=== As a unitary authority ===
Year	SNP	Labour	Liberal Democrats	Conservative	Independent
1995	3	28	0	4	1
1999 (Note: New ward boundaries.)	10	14	0	4	1 (Note: Independent Labour.)
2003	11	10	5	2	1
2007 (Note: Change to single transferable vote system and new ward boundaries.)	13	10	3	2	1
2012	16	10	1	1	1
2017	14	9	2	3	1
2022	15	9	4	1	0

== Results maps ==
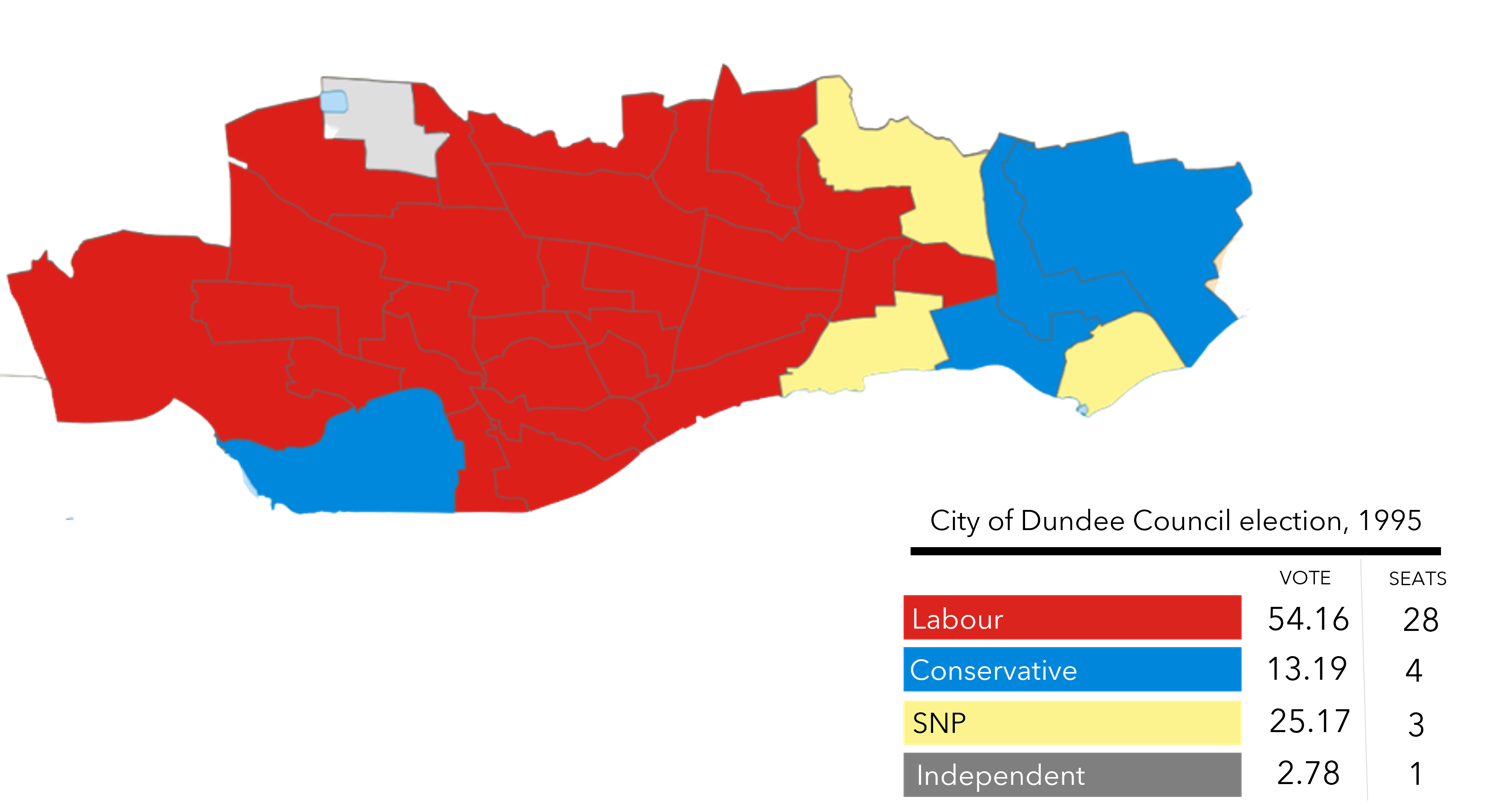
1995 results map

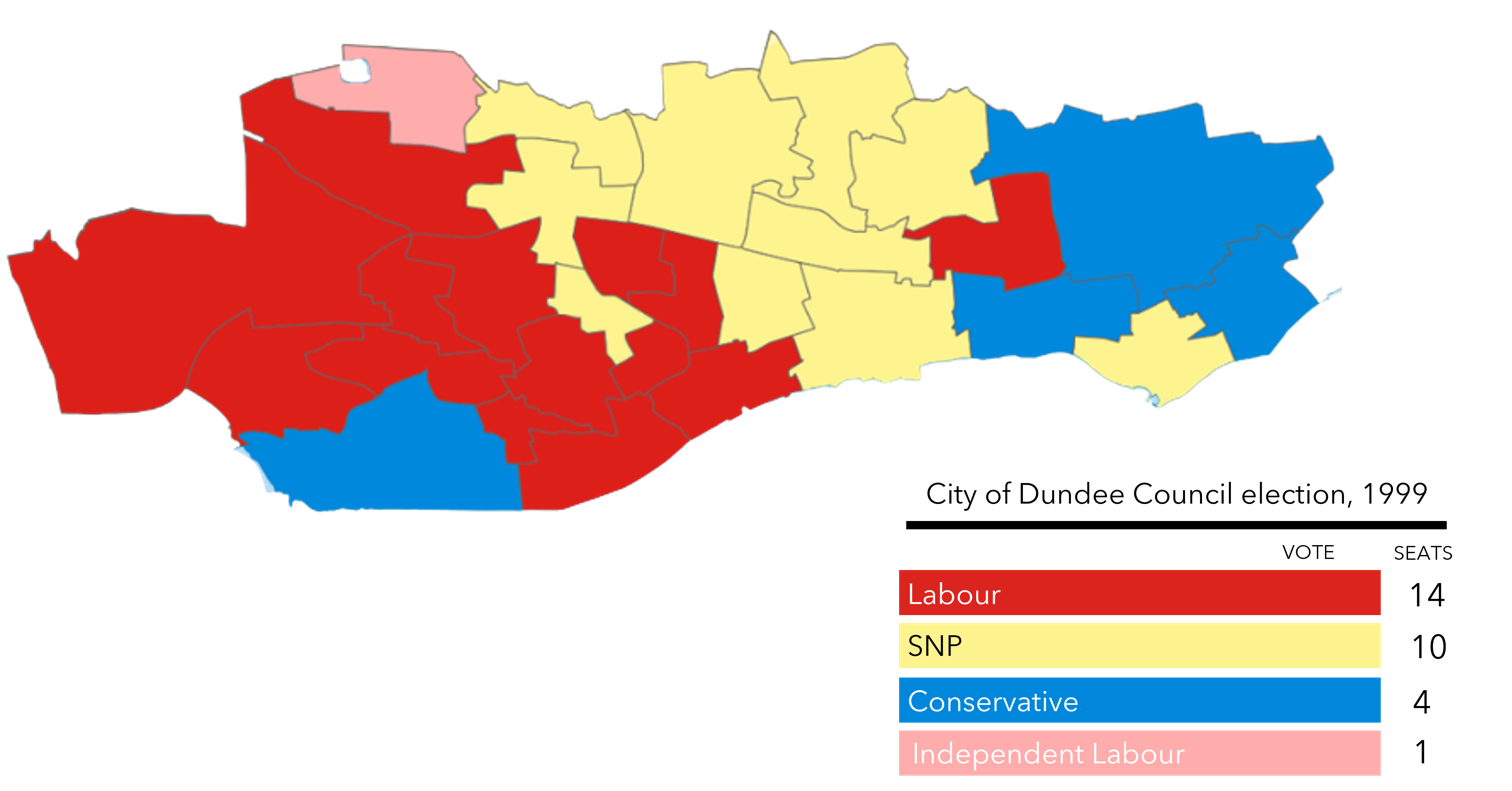
1999 results map

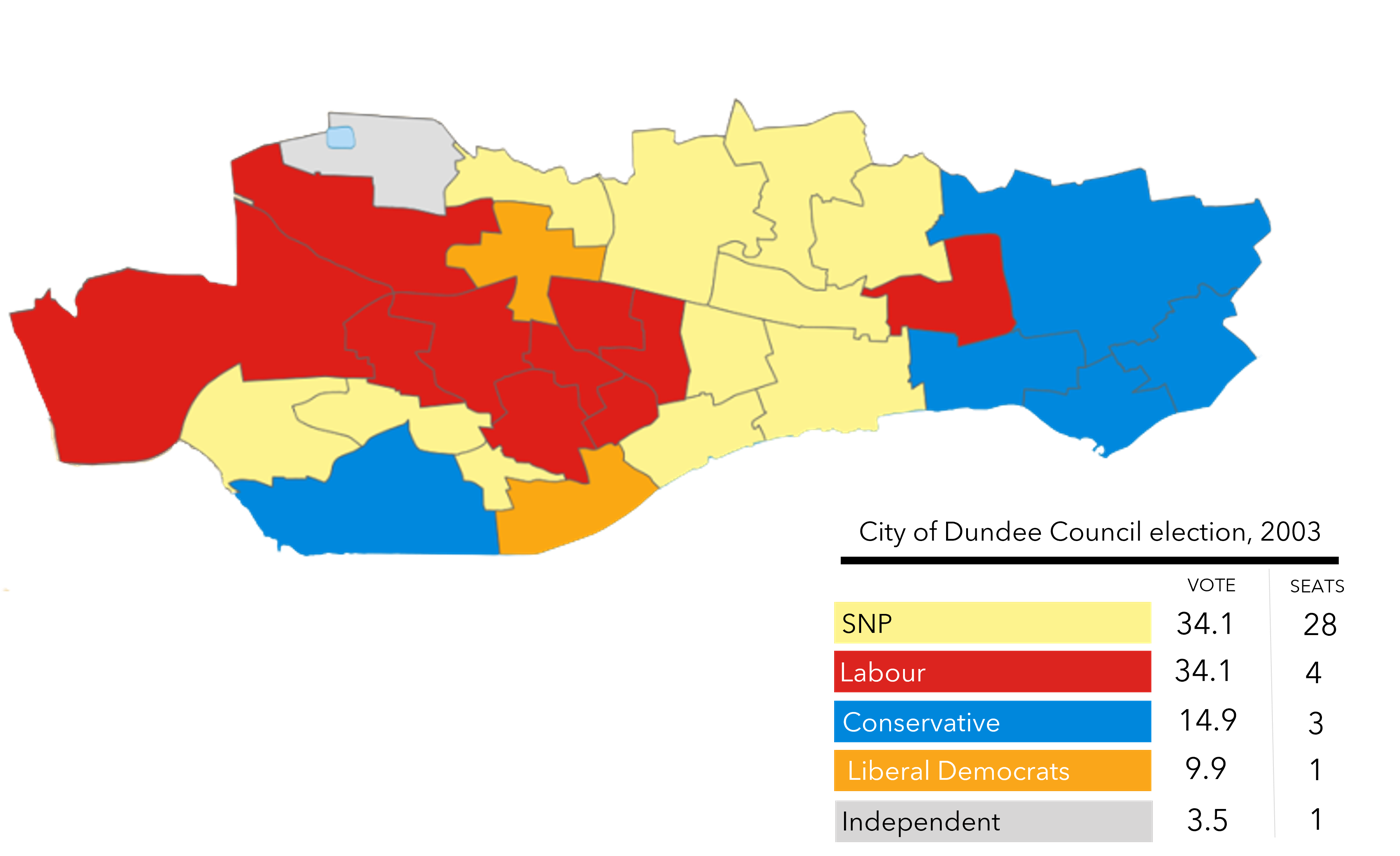
2003 results map

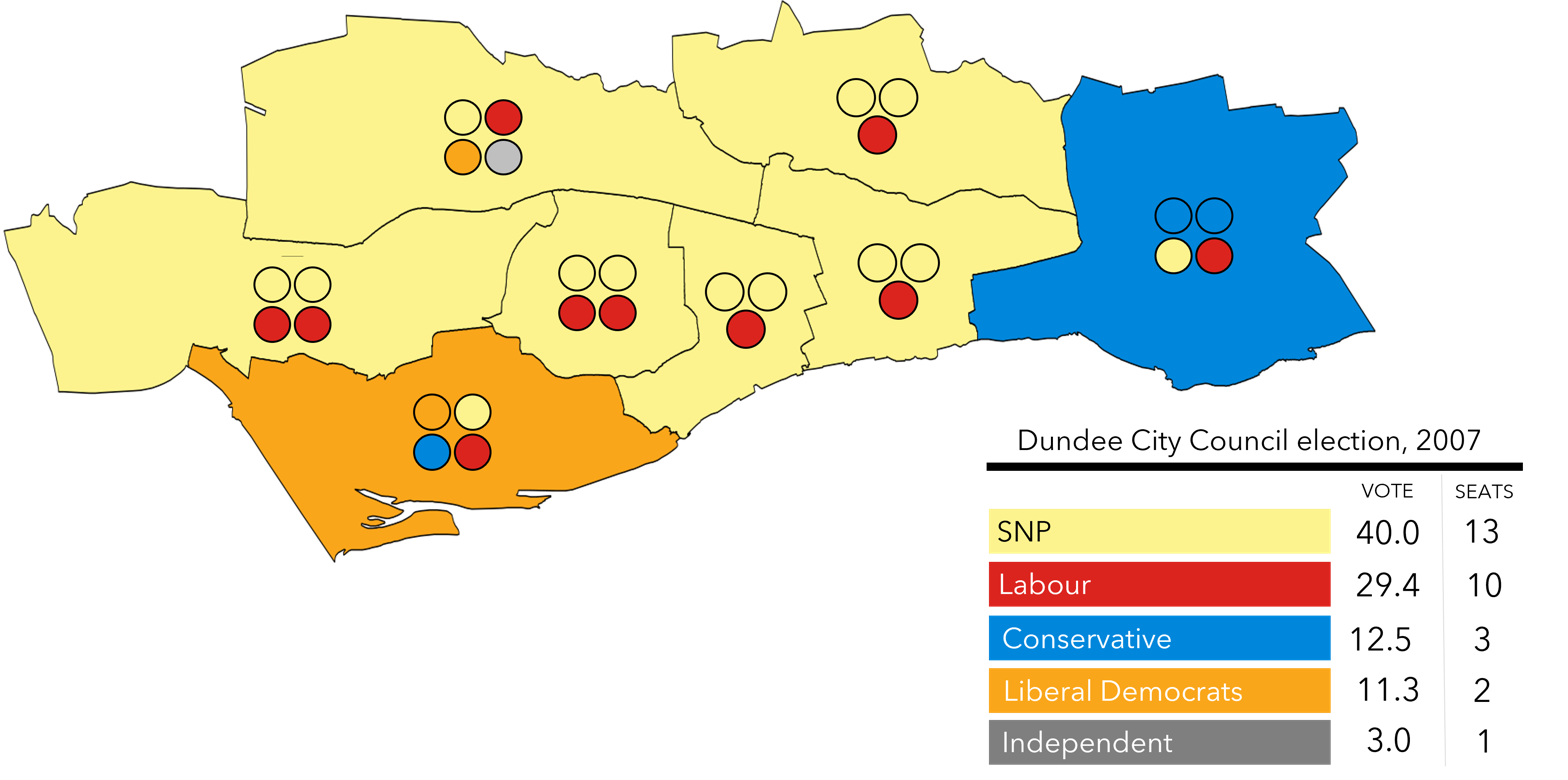
2007 results map

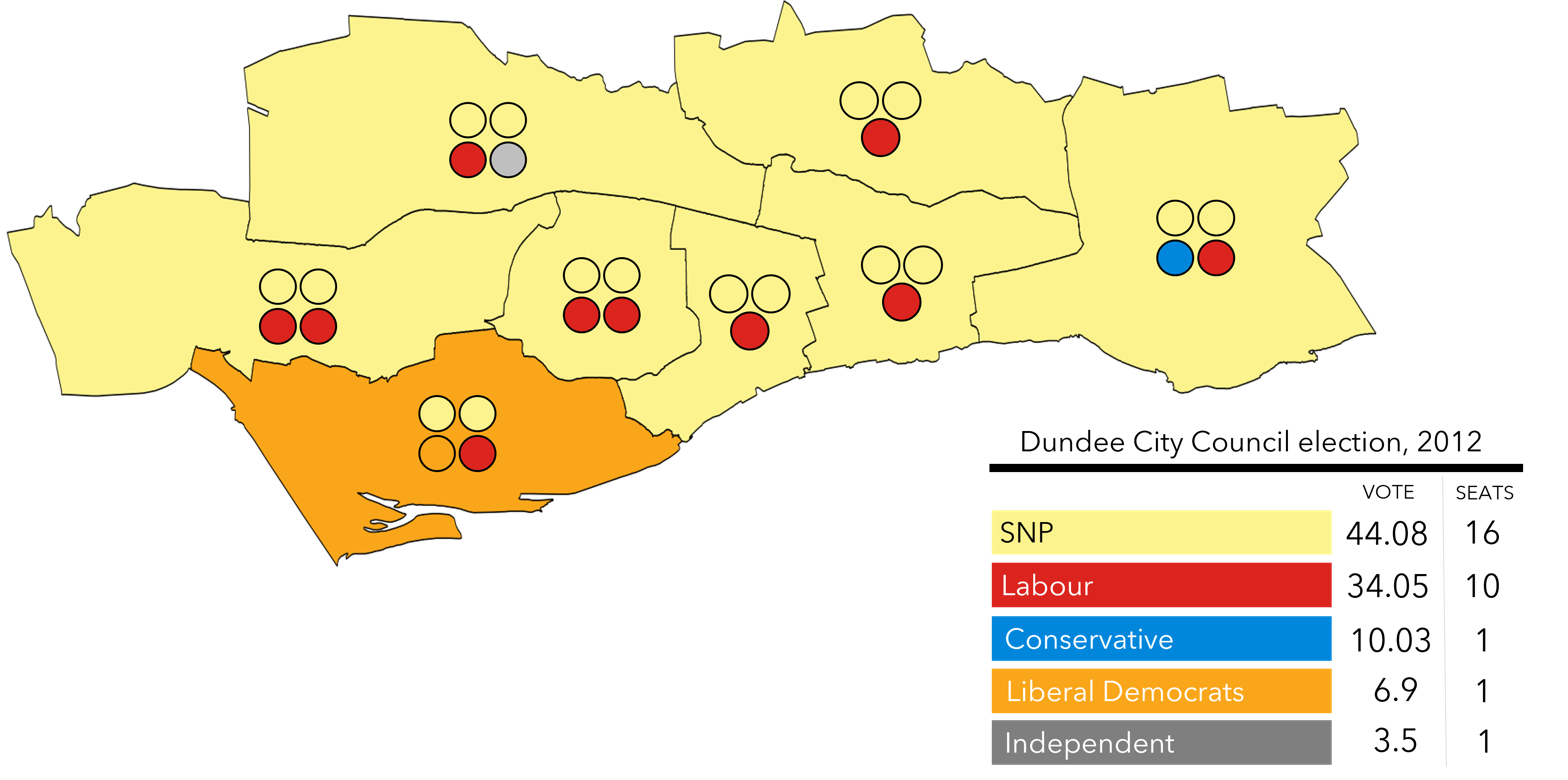
2012 results map

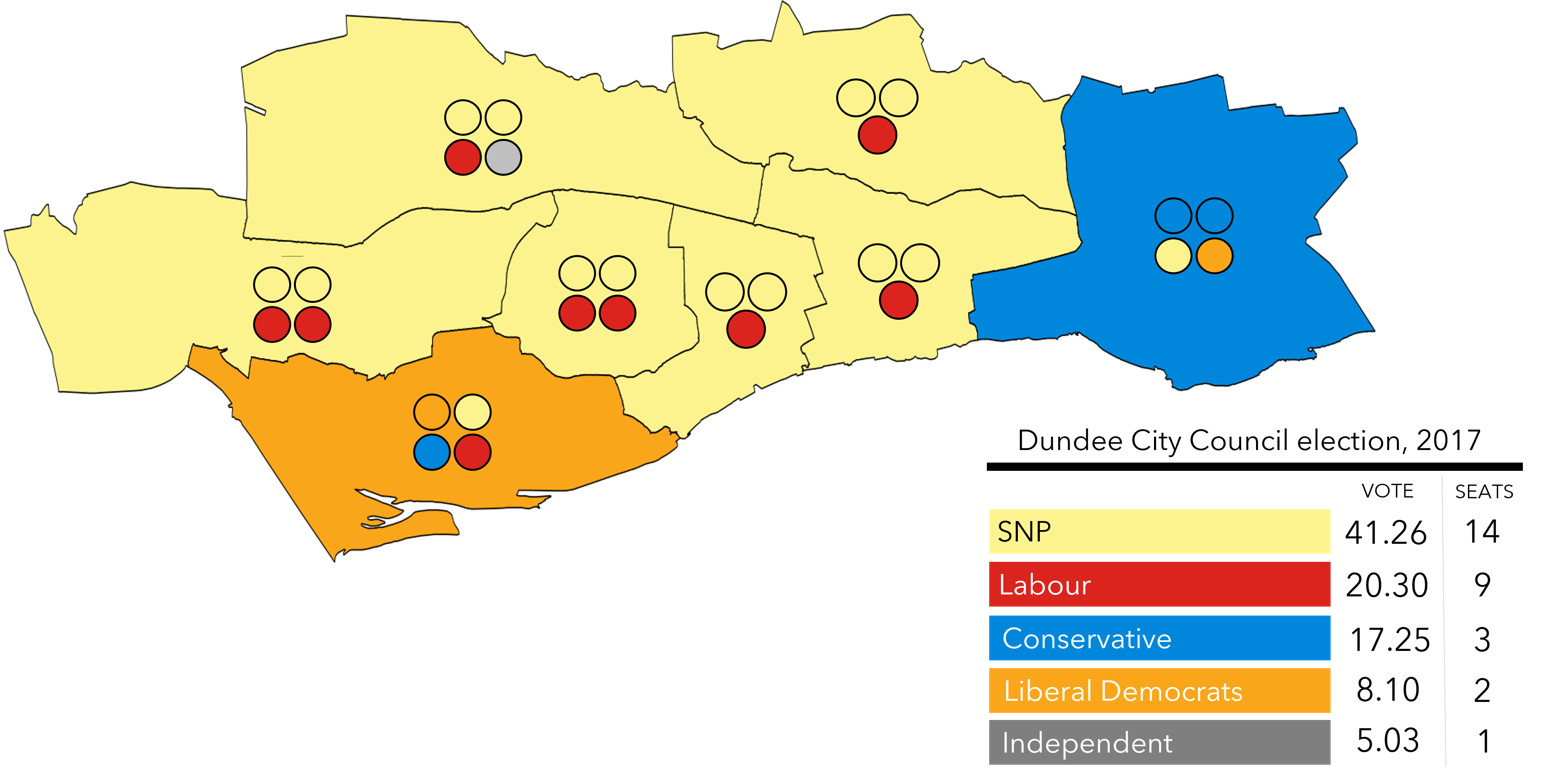
2017 results map

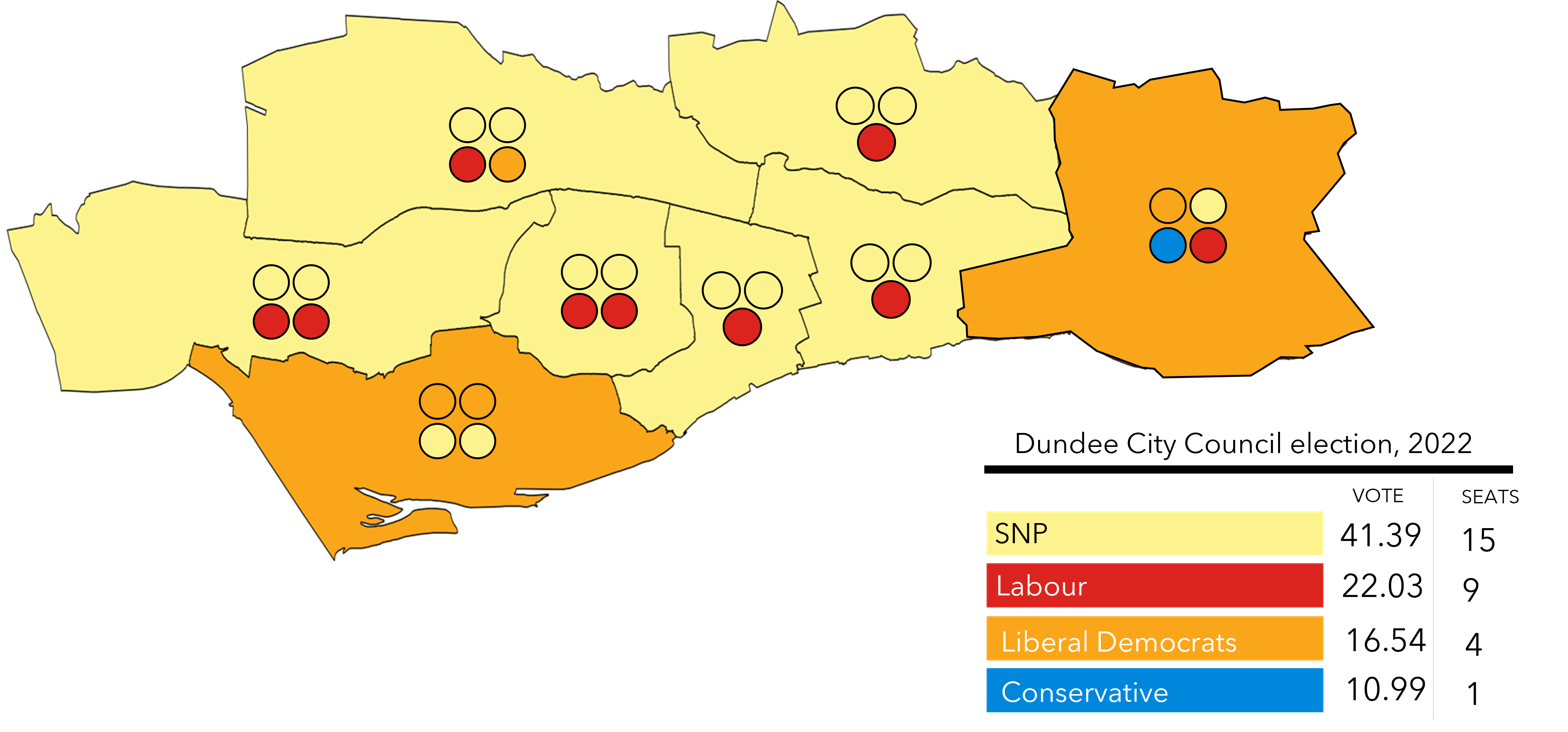
2022 results map

== By-elections ==
=== 2007-2012 ===
Lochee By-Election 22 November 2007
Party	Candidate	FPv%	Count			
Party	Candidate	FPv%	1	2	3	4
SNP	Alan Ross	48.9	2,005	2,020	2,028	2,055
Labour	George McIrvine	34.0	1,395	1,412	1,432	1,448
Liberal Democrats	Christopher Hall	10.6	435	437	446	500
Conservative	Martyn Geddes	3.8	154	156	161	
Solidarity	Neil Bell	1.4	57	65		
Scottish Socialist	Alan Albert Graham	1.3	55			
SNP hold						
Valid: 4,071 Spoilt: 40 Quota: 2,051 Turnout: 4,101

Maryfield By-Election 12 March 2009
Party	Candidate	FPv%	Count					
Party	Candidate	FPv%	1	2	3	4	5	6
SNP	Craig Melville	47.6	1,550	1,551	1,557	1,571	1,620	1,747
Labour	George McIrvine	31.1	1,013	1,018	1,021	1,031	1,052	1,189
Liberal Democrats	Chris Hall	10.9	354	356	362	367	455	
Conservative	Colin Stewart	6.9	224	226	237	241		
Scottish Socialist	Angela Gorrie	1.6	52	52	55			
Independent	Grant Simmons	1.1	35	48				
Independent	Dave Young	0.9	28					
SNP hold								
Valid: 2,607 Spoilt: 34 Quota: 1,629 Turnout: 3,290

=== 2012-2017 ===
Maryfield By-Election 31 March 2016
Party	Candidate	FPv%	Count		
Party	Candidate	FPv%	1	2	3
SNP	Lynne Short	49.5	1,383	1,389	1,399
Labour	Alan Cowan	22.7	634	637	648
Conservative	James Clancy	10.5	294	304	317
TUSC	Stuart Fairweather	5.1	142	147	161
Scottish Green	Jacob Ellis	4.1	116	118	123
Liberal Democrats	Christopher McIntyre	3.0	85	87	92
Independent	Brian McLeod	2.6	73	81	
UKIP	Calum Walker	2.5	69		
SNP hold					
Valid: 2,796 Spoilt: 28 Quota: 1,399 Turnout: 2,824

=== 2017-2022 ===
North East By-Election 2 May 2019
Party	Candidate	FPv%	Count					
Party	Candidate	FPv%	1	2	3	4	5	6
SNP	Steven Rome	46.9	1,507	1,510	1,534	1,555	1,576	2,045
Labour	Jim Malone	38.1	1,224	1,229	1,248	1,284	1,388	
Conservative	Robert Lindsay	8.4	271	274	280	290		
TUSC	Michael Taylor	2.8	91	109	122			
Scottish Green	Alison Orr	2.4	77	82				
Citizens First	Roger Keech	1.4	45					
SNP gain from Labour								
Valid: 3,215 Spoilt: 31 Quota: 1,608 Turnout: 3,246

=== 2022-2027 ===
Lochee By-Election 3 October 2024
Party	Candidate	FPv%	Count						
Party	Candidate	FPv%	1	2	3	4	5	6	7
SNP	Lee Mills	37.3	1,203	1,211	1,226	1,292	1,369	1,390	1,742
Labour	Marty Smith	35.6	1,148	1,167	1,211	1,236	1,285	1,357	
Conservative	Calum Walker	6.8	219	230	258	268	284		
Scottish Green	Katie Treharne	5.5	176	190	217	238			
Alba	Alan Ross	5.5	178	204	212				
Liberal Democrats	Outi Bourke	4.8	156	171					
Workers Party	John Reddy	4.4	143						
SNP gain from Labour									
Valid: 3,223 Spoilt: 31 Quota: 1,612 Turnout: 3,254

Strathmartine By-Election 3 October 2024
Party	Candidate	FPv%	Count					
Party	Candidate	FPv%	1	2	3	4	5	6
SNP	Jimmy Black	35.0	1,188	1,205	1,260	1,274	1,426	1,835
Liberal Democrats	Jenny Blain	26.9	912	932	963	1,016	1,394	
Labour	Richard McCready	26.9	911	929	947	972		
Conservative	Naveed Ali	4.2	143	145	150			
Scottish Green	Callum Baird	3.6	121	134				
TUSC	Donald Macleod	3.4	116					
SNP hold								
Valid: 3,432 Spoilt: 41 Quota: 1,696 Turnout: 3,473
