= Tom Gibson (Scottish politician) =

Thomas Hill Gibson (22 September 1893 – 23 April 1975) was a Scottish nationalist political activist.

Born in Glasgow, Gibson became a supporter of home rule for Scotland through his membership of the Young Scots' Society, an affiliate of the Liberal Party. He fought in World War I, and on his return, joined the Scottish Home Rule Association. He left the group in 1924 in opposition to its support of John Maclean, and instead joined the Scots National League. He quickly became the group's leading figure, and ensured that it became the core of the National Party of Scotland, which he founded in 1928.

Gibson married Elma Campbell, and the couple moved to London in 1932, where he became secretary of the British Steel Federation and financial director of the British Iron and Steel Corporation. In his absence, the National Party began splitting between supporters of independence and those who favoured devolution. Against his wishes, the devolutionists organised a merger with the Scottish Party, founding the Scottish National Party (SNP). Gibson became increasingly involved in the civil service, and was out of Scottish nationalist politics until after World War II. He rejoined the SNP in the late 1940s, working with Robert McIntyre and Arthur Donaldson, and was party president from around 1950 until 1958, remaining active into the 1960s.

Party political offices
| Preceded by Roland Muirhead | President of the Scottish National Party; 1950–1958 | Succeeded by Robert McIntyre |
