= Elma Campbell =

Scottish nationalist activist

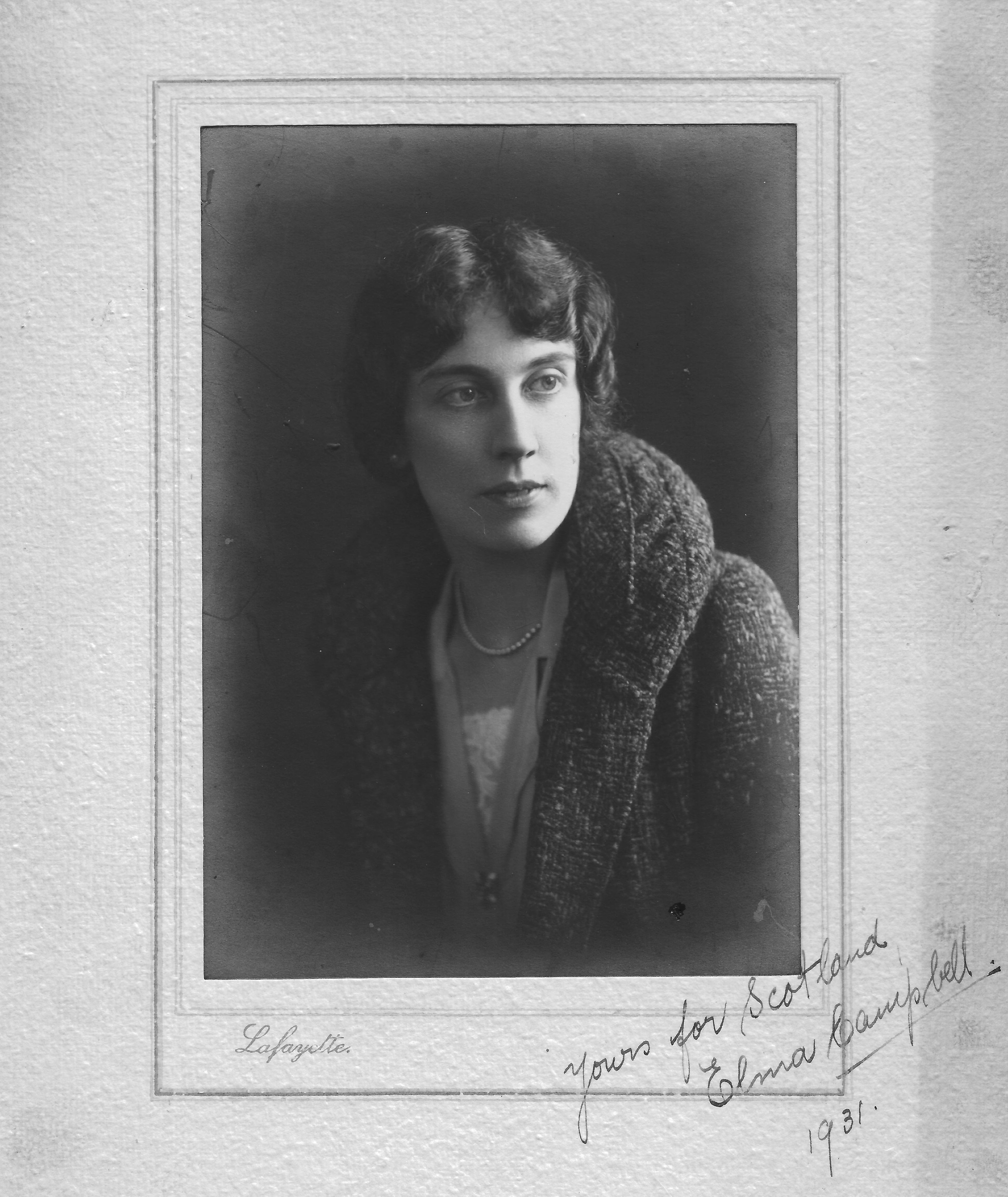

Personal details
- Born: 14 January 1901 Cathcart, Glasgow, Scotland
- Died: 28 February 1983 (aged 82)
- Party: National Party of Scotland
- Spouse: Tom Gibson
- Committees: National Council

Wilhelmina Allison Campbell (14 January 1901 – 28 February 1983) was a Scottish nationalist activist.

== Biography ==
Born in the Cathcart area of Glasgow, Campbell attended the University of Glasgow, where she became active in the Conservative Party and was a champion debater. On graduating, she became a teacher and increasingly interested in Scottish nationalism, becoming a founder member of the National Party of Scotland in 1928.

Campbell rapidly became the most prominent women in the NPS, jointly convening its Women's Section and sitting on the National Council and various committees, while also becoming one of its best-known public speakers. The only woman to stand for election to Westminster for the NPS, she stood for the party at the 1931 Glasgow St Rollox by-election, at which she took 15.8% of the vote, the best performance by any party candidate throughout its existence. She stood again in Glasgow St Rollox at the 1931 general election, her vote dropping only slightly, to 13.3%.

In March 1932, Campbell married Tom Gibson, a fellow members of the NPS, and the couple moved to London later in the year. Although she never again played a major role in Scottish nationalism, she made occasional contributions, including a 1955 piece for the Scots Independent in which she described the process of forming the NPS.
