= Roland Muirhead =

Scottish businessman (1868–1964)

Roland Eugene Muirhead

President of the Scottish National Party
- In office 1936–1950
- Preceded by: Robert Bontine Cunninghame Graham
- Succeeded by: Tom Gibson

Personal details
- Born: 24 July 1868 Lochwinnoch, Renfrewshire, Scotland
- Died: 2 August 1964 (aged 96) Meikle Cloak Farm, Lochwinnoch, Renfrewshire, Scotland
- Party: Scottish National Party
- Other political affiliations: National Party of Scotland; Independent Labour Party; Liberal Party
- Spouse: Flora McFadzean (m. 1945–1964)
- Education: High School of Glasgow
- Occupation: Businessman

Roland Eugene Muirhead (24 July 1868 – 2 August 1964) was a Scottish businessman and Scottish nationalist politician.

Muirhead was born in Lochwinnoch, Renfrewshire, the second son of Andrew Muirhead, a businessman and owner of the Gryffe Tannery, and his wife, Isabella Reid. Roland was a member of the Young Scots' Society but left in 1914 due to pacifist objections to Liberal Party support for Britain's involvement in the First World War. He became a member of the Independent Labour Party from 1918 but later left, becoming first chairman of the National Party of Scotland. He was on the left of the Scottish National Party (SNP) following its creation from the National Party of Scotland and the Scottish Party and served as president 1936 to 1950. He opposed conscription during the Second World War. A letter to a Nazi agent, Dr Von Teffenar, was found at his home.

In 1950, Muirhead formed the Scottish National Congress, a direct action group focused on campaigning for Scottish Home Rule. While remaining a leading member of the SNP, he devoted most of his time to the new group and, ultimately, the production of a proposed Scottish constitution.

He died in 1964 and was buried at his home town of Lochwinnoch. In 1968 a plaque was unveiled at his former home in commemoration.

Tom Johnston MP, a lifelong friend of Muirhead, and Labour Secretary of State for Scotland during the 2nd World War Coalition government, stated that Roland Muirhead was 'the greatest patriot which Renfrewshire has produced since William Wallace'.

Party political offices
Preceded by Robert Bontine Cunninghame Graham	President of the Scottish National Party; 1936–1950	Succeeded by Tom Gibson
