= The Myths and Legends of the North American Indians =

1914 book by Lewis Spence

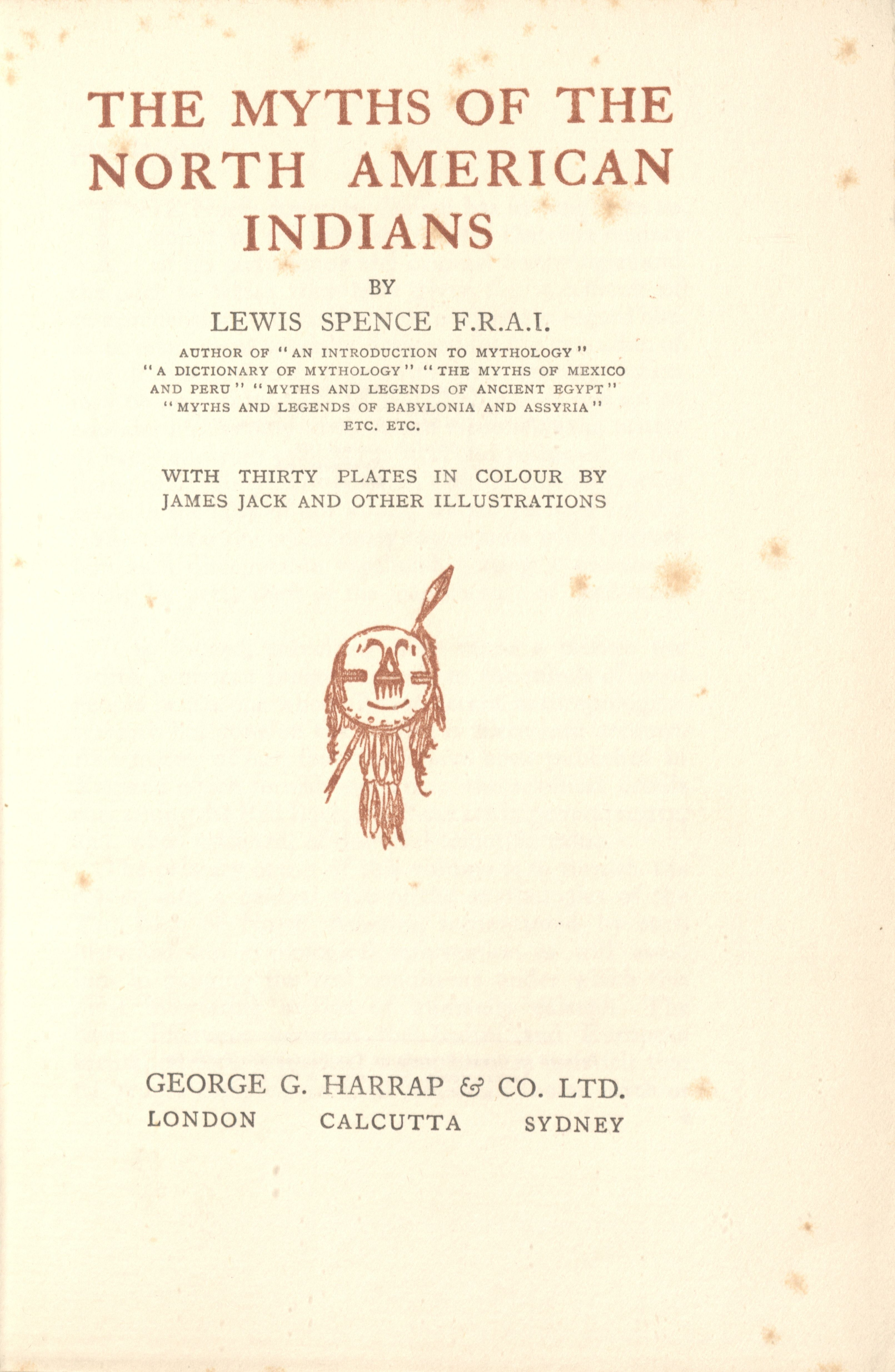
- Title page of the book
- Author: Lewis Spence
- Illustrator: James Jack
- Language: English
- Publisher: George G. Harrap & Co.
- Publication date: 1914
- Pages: 392
- ISBN: 1-904-91908-1

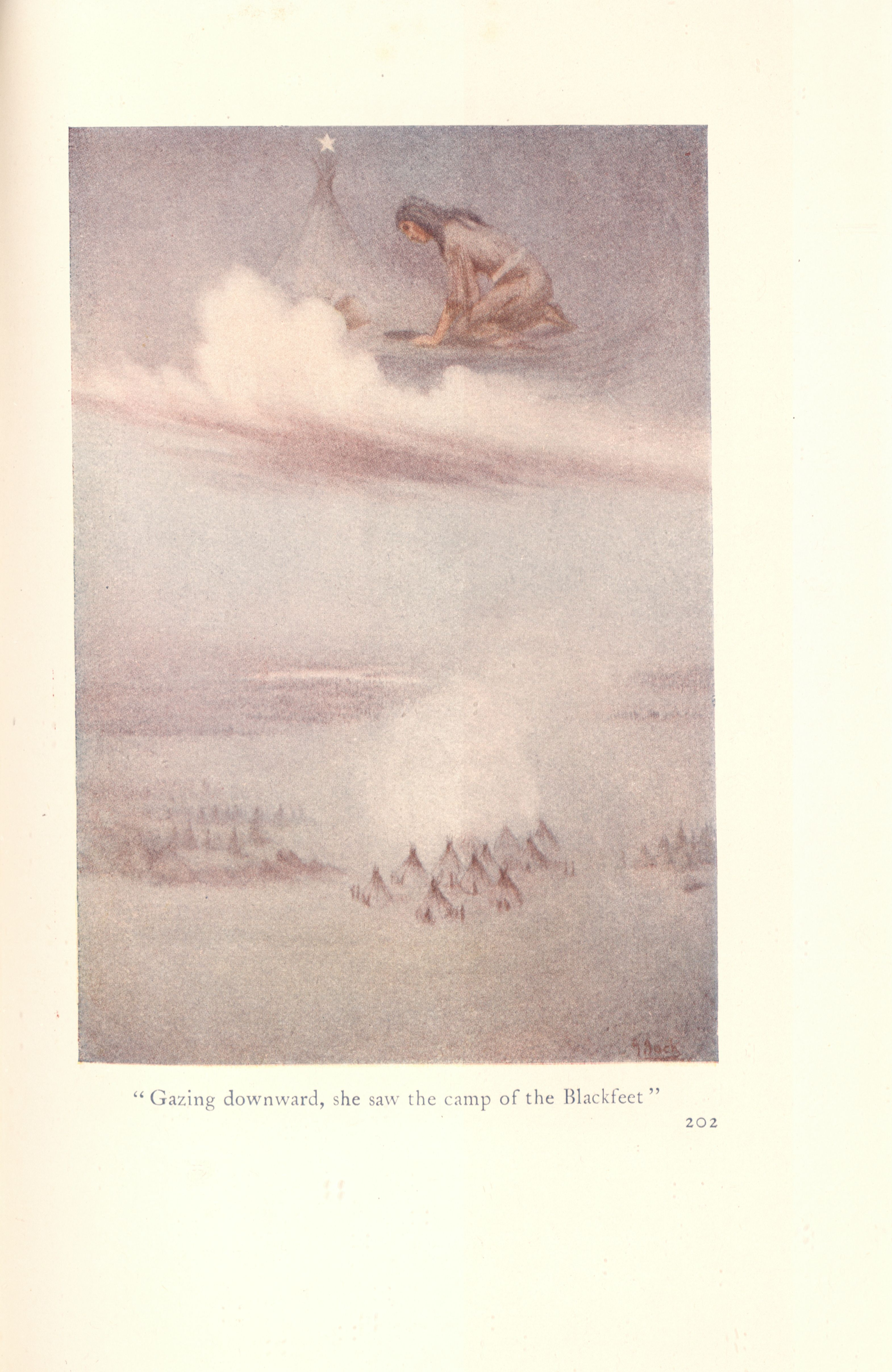
Page from the book

The Myths and Legends of the North American Indians is a book written by Lewis Spence and was first published in 1914 by London George G. Harrap & Company. It contains a collection of legends and myths of different Native American tribes and 32 coloured illustrations relating to some of the stories, which were created by James Jack.

== Context ==
After Spence graduated from Edinburgh University, he worked as a journalist for The Scotsman for five years from 1899 to 1904. In 1905, Spence published his first book Mysteries of Britain: Secret Rites and Traditions of Ancient Britain Restored, marking the beginning of his life-long interest in anthropology. When Spence moved to London in 1906, he began to study mythology and folklore, which led to the creation of The Popul Vuh: The Mythic and Heroic Sagas of the Kiches of Central America in 1908. When returning to Edinburgh in 1909, Spence decided to write more books on the domain of mythology and thus published A Dictionary of Mythology in 1910, and The Myths of Mexico and Peru in 1913, which was written because of Spence's growing interest in the mythology and folklore of Mexico and Central America at the time. This interest then shifted to North America in The Myths and Legends of North American Indians (1914), which, being Spence's fifth published book, was still part of his early bibliography.

In the early twentieth century, there had already been other books collecting the myths and legends of the Native Americans, several of which in their preface expressed a want to make known the character of the Aboriginal culture through sharing their stories: For example, in North American Indian Fairy Tales Robert Coutts Armour claimed that the Indians' Folk-tales are the best reflection of their character. Mary Catherine Judd, in her work Wigwam Stories Told by North American Indians, emphasised the Indians' love of the beautiful and of the humorous that underlies their stories, a characteristic that she wished to share through this publication. In The Indians' Book Natalie Curtis stated that her intention is for the book to make the Indian known, both to White Americans and to younger generations of Native Americans, such that Indian culture would not be forgotten. As a consequence, she hoped, Whites and Indians could leave their history of conflict behind and live united as one people.

== Contents ==
The Myths and Legends of the North American Indians contains two introductory chapters, whose information, according to Spence, is required to properly understand and appreciate the following five chapters covering the titular myths and legends. In the first chapter Spence gives a historical overview of the discovery of the North American Indians as well as of their history with the European settlers. It also describes the most common customs, traditions, and way of life of different major groups of tribes, such as the Algonquins or Iroquois. The second chapter covers overarching mythologies that are generally present in all tribes, for example the central cultural beliefs of animism, totemism, and fetishism, or common religious ideas about gods or morality.

The remaining five chapters contain myths and legends of the respective groups of tribes, namely of the Algonquians, Iroquois, Sioux, Pawnees, and of other Indian groups that reside in the northern and north-western parts of North America. Spence concludes that the stories of the North American Indians resemble European and Scandinavian folk tales, but stresses that they nonetheless possess a very distinguishing atmosphere of their own.

In the preface Spence stresses the need to put the tales of the North American Indians into writing and to confront the white American population with it: "[The primary objective is] to furnish the reader with a general view of the mythologies of the Red Man of North America, accompanied by such historical and ethnological information as will assist him in gauging the real conditions under which this most interesting section of humanity existed." In the afterword Spence expresses his hope that through reading these tales, Americans might see the similarities between themselves and the Native Americans. The end of the book features a bibliography of relevant literature and a glossary of domain-specific, mostly culture-related, terms that are used throughout the book.

== Subsequent publications ==
Since its original release in 1914 and 2023, The Myths and Legends of the North American Indians was re-published more than a dozen times under slightly different names and sometimes with new content, such as A Brief Guide to Native American Myths and Legends, which contains commentary and a new introductory essay by Jon E. Lewis, or The Legends of Native Americans, which is a compilation of several books similar to The Myths and Legends of the North American Indians that serves as a big collection of Native American stories. The book has also been published in other languages, like German and Spanish. In 2021, The Myths and Legends of the North American Indians was adapted into an audiobook named Native American Mythology. It contains the stories of the original book narrated by the voice of Jim D. Johnston.

== Reception ==
While Spence's work in general has been described as "[meeting] stiff criticism in professional journals", The Myths and Legends of the North American Indians specifically was reviewed in the July 1915 issue of The Journal of Race and Development and the book's stories were described as being "told in a very interesting fashion." In the twenty-first century the book came into discourse on goodreads.com, as it was called out by some for its allegedly racist vocabulary used to describe Native Americans. User reviews deemed terms Spence uses throughout the book, like "primitive", "savage man", "Red Man", and "uncivilised", problematic and Spence's view of the North American Indians was criticised as being hypocritical and unjustly demeaning towards the race. Some report that they did not finish the book because of this. Others defend Spence, claiming that people may miss out on a good book, only because they fail to discern actually racist and demeaning language from outdated language. The 2012 republication of The Myths and Legends of the North American Indians, titled Native American Myths, describes the original book as a "major forerunner of modern studies of myth" and the 2013 republication A Brief Guide to Native American Myths and Legends calls the original book "seminal". The Myths and Legends of the North American Indians has been referenced in many other pieces of literature, several of which also deal with (Native American) mythology. The book is referenced for its descriptions of the Indian way of life through the stories it tells and for the purpose of analysing their themes or symbols.

In the years after the publication of The Myths and Legends of the North American Indians, Spence kept writing about myths and legends of other cultures in works such as The Myths and Legends of Babylonia and Assyria (1917) or The Legends and Romances of Spain (1920). Following that, in the 1920s, Spence got involved in Scottish nationalist politics by joining the Scots National League. During that time, his interests shifted away from examining the legends of different cultures and focalise on one specific legend, the mystery of Atlantis. He wrote several books on the topic, notably The Problem of Atlantis (1924), Atlantis in America (1925), and The History of Atlantis (1926). In 1951, four years before his death, Spence was awarded a royal pension for services to literature.

Following the release of The Myths and Legends of the North American Indians in 1914, hundreds of books on North American myths and legends have been published until 2023, the vast majority of which came out after 1980. In the decades following the release of The Myths and Legends of the North American Indians, only few other collections of Native American folk tales and legends were published. Volume 10 of The Mythology of all Races (1916), released two years after The Myths and Legends of the North American Indians, is an objective and descriptive collection of myths and legends of the Indians. The remaining few books chose to zoom in on specific subgroups of Indians, for example on myths of the northwestern Indians, southwestern Indians, and Indians from the Northern Rockies, tales of the Yaqui, of the New York State Iroquois, or of the Alabama-Coushatta Indians of Texas. Some of these books expressed similar sentiments as The Myths and Legends of the North American Indians, such as one author's love and shared sympathy for the Indian culture or praising the Indian craftsmanship, artistry, and story-richness that is transmitted through their tales. In the early twenty-first century (2000 to 2023), accompanying the influx of books on the topic, emerged other kinds of story collections recounting Indian tales. Aside from further books focussing on the legends of one particular region or tribe, older books on the topic were re-published. Books for researchers and experts, serving as objective and comprehensive collections of Native American stories, were also published. A notably large cluster of books of that era was composed of story collections that served entertainment purposes and were intended for the general public, among which were educational children's books as well.
