= John Adair McDowell =

John Adair McDowell may refer to:

- John Adair McDowell (colonel) (1825–1887), American military officer and engineer
- John Adair McDowell (major) (1789–1823), American military officer and judge

== See also ==
- John McDowell (disambiguation)
