= John McDowall =

John McDowall may refer to:

- John McDowall (swimmer), British swimmer
- John Kevan McDowall, Scottish solicitor and politician

== See also ==
- John McDowell (disambiguation)
