= Scottish National Movement =

Historical political movement in Scotland

The Scottish National Movement (SNM) was a political organisation which campaigned for Scottish independence in the 1920s. It amalgamated with other Scottish nationalist bodies in 1928 to form the National Party of Scotland.

A breakaway from the Scots National League, the SNM was a small, Edinburgh-based group led by Lewis Spence. Like Spence, its followers were mainly literary figures evincing a romantic, nostalgic nationalism typical of the period. The SNM aimed to re-establish a Scottish Parliament and an independent state within the British Empire. As a matter of tactics, it gave its support to any measure directed towards Home Rule. It was active in the negotiations from which the National Party of Scotland emerged, and into which the SNM merged.
