= Ernest Wallcousins =

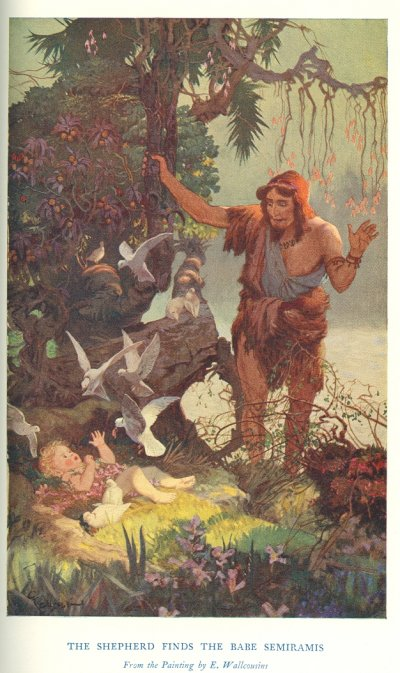
The Shepherd finds the Babe Semiramis; from Myths of Babylonia and Assyria, by D. Mackenzie

Ernest Charles Wallcousins (né Cousins, 21 July 1882 – 1976) was a British illustrator and later a famous portraitist and landscape painter. He illustrated royal occasions, was an official WWII artist, and painted British prime minister Winston Churchill's WWII victory portrait in 1945.

== Work ==
Wallcousins illustrated Celtic Myth, Legend, Poetry, and Romance, by Charles Squire (Gresham, 1905, 1920); and Myths of Babylonia and Assyria, by Donald A. Mackenzie (Gresham, 1915). His style was Pre-Raphaelite, Celtic romance but with strong, muscular fighting heroes as well as romantic women. His work shows dramatic structure, anatomic accuracy and sensuality, with a characteristic vault of space at the top of the design.

His works include illustrations for Bibby's Annual, 1921, including its front cover. He designed posters for the London Underground Group 1925, and became famed for illustrations of royal occasions. Papers in The National Archives show that he was the designer of the famous Keep Calm and Carry On poster.

Wallcousins painted a famous portrait of Sir Winston Churchill from life, as the wartime Prime Minister celebrating the Allied victories in 1945. This was commissioned by Odhams Press for the “Victory Book” published in 1946. He also painted Sir Henry Wood, the conductor of The Proms for over 50 years.

Wallcousins's works can be found in museums including the Science Museum, London; and the Museum and Art Gallery, Southend-on-Sea.
