= William Gillies (Scottish politician) =

Scottish nationalist and socialist (1865–1932)

- Born: 1865; Galloway, Scotland
- Died: 1932 (aged 66–67)
- Occupations: Journalist; playwright

William Gillies (1865 – 1932) was a Scottish socialist and nationalist politician. He helped to form the Scots National League, which joined with other bodies to form the National Party of Scotland, which in turn evolved into the Scottish National Party (SNP).

== Biography ==
Gillies was born in the Galloway region of Scotland in 1865, but grew up in London. He was interested in Scottish history from an early age and at the age of seventeen he became friend to John Murdoch who was then the editor of The Highlander. Gillies became as enthusiastic for the rights of crofters in the Scottish Highlands and joined the Highland Land League. He was at this stage in favour of some form of home rule for Scotland within the United Kingdom but grew to support Scottish independence instead.

Gillies also began to learn Gaelic and wrote a number of plays in the language, also serving as secretary of the Gaelic Society of London from 1904 to 1905. However he stood down as secretary when the society rejected his proposal that they should campaign to make Gaelic the national language of Scotland.

Gillies, encouraged by Murdoch, also became aware of the developments in the politics of Ireland becoming an ardent supporter of Sinn Féin, associating with prominent figures such as Art O'Brien who would become the head of the Irish Self Determination League. He supported the Easter Rising of 1916 and was deeply critical of those socialists who refused to support it, along with those in the Scottish Gaelic revival circles who refused to support it.

Gillies formed a friendship with Ruairidh Erskine of Mar contributing articles to his publications, Guth na Bliadhna (Voice of the Year) and Alba. In 1920 the Scots National League (SNL) was formed and these two men became its principal leaders. Gillies wanted the SNL to reflect the revolutionary aims of the Irish nationalists by then engaged in a war of independence with the British state. He hoped that it would be the organisation which would lead Scotland to independence and revive the Gaelic language. Gillies became a regular contributor to the SNL's regular publication Liberty (which was in fact in part funded by Sinn Féin).

Gillies was involved in a little-known chapter of Scotland's history when he was involved in the establishment of a volunteer force which was ready to use armed force to win Scottish independence. This body (styled Fianna na hAlba) abandoned their plans on the advice of the Irish nationalist leadership. Michael Collins, in a letter to Art O'Brien stated that they were weaker than the Irish nationalist forces at even their weakest point during their war of independence and stated, "they do not appreciate the particular difficulties they are up against".

In 1926, Gillies became the first editor of the SNL's newspaper, The Scots Independent.

Gillies and Erskine led the SNL into the formation of the National Party of Scotland (NPS) in 1928, which was far more moderate than the SNL. This resulted in many SNL members leaving the NPS dissatisfied with their methods. Gillies died in 1932, two years before the NPS evolved into the Scottish National Party (SNP), which at the time was even more moderate than the NPS had been.

== Legacy ==
Angus Clark, one of Gillies' closest friends wrote on hearing of his death, "he has left an example of noble effort, great faith and true devotion to his country."

Gillies' granddaughter, Anne Lorne Gillies, is active in politics, contesting the 1999 elections to the European Parliament as an SNP candidate.
