= The Scots Independent =

Scottish political newspaper

- Type: political newspaper
- Format: digital and print
- Editor: Jim Lynch
- Founded: 1926
- Political alignment: Scottish independence Scottish National Party
- Language: English; Scots; Gaelic
- City: Stirling
- Country: Scotland
- Sister newspapers: Flag in the Wind (weekly online)
- Website: scotsindependent.scot

The Scots Independent is a monthly Scottish political newspaper that is in favour of Scottish independence. It was formed in 1926 with William Gillies as editor, by the Scots National League (SNL) and switched its allegiance to the National Party of Scotland (NPS) when the SNL joined with them in 1928.

When the NPS merged with the Scottish Party in 1934 to form the Scottish National Party (SNP) they switched to supporting them. The paper is still today largely pro-SNP.

Editors of the paper have included Arthur Donaldson, Robert McIntyre, Tom H. Gibson, John L. Kinloch, Alastair Macdonald, Michael Grieve, Albert D. Mackie, David Murison, Douglas Stewart, Alwyn James, Colin Bell, W. Kenneth Fee and James and Jennifer Taggart.

== See also ==
- List of newspapers in Scotland
- The National
