= Myths and Legends of Babylonia and Assyria (Lewis Spence) =

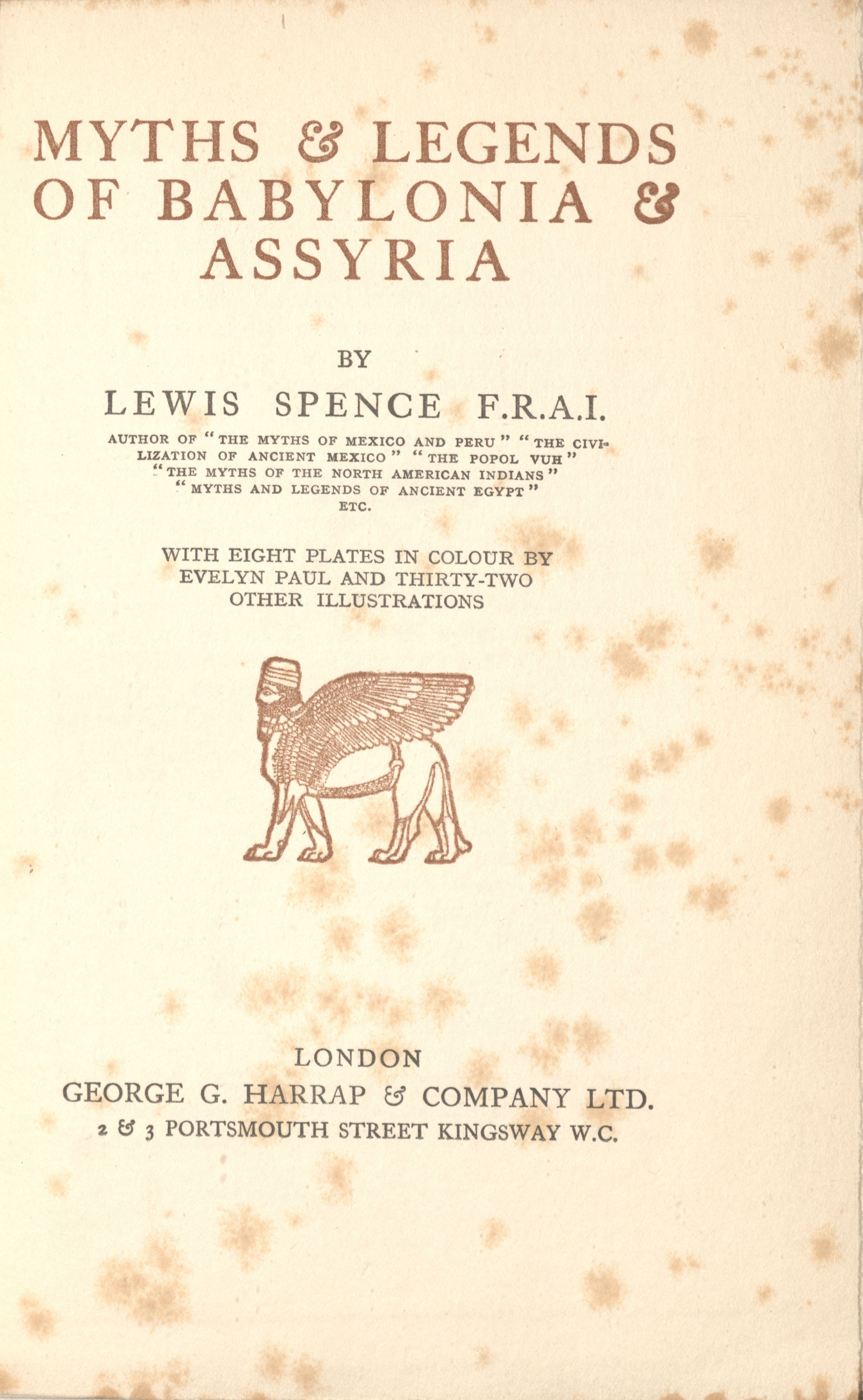
Title page

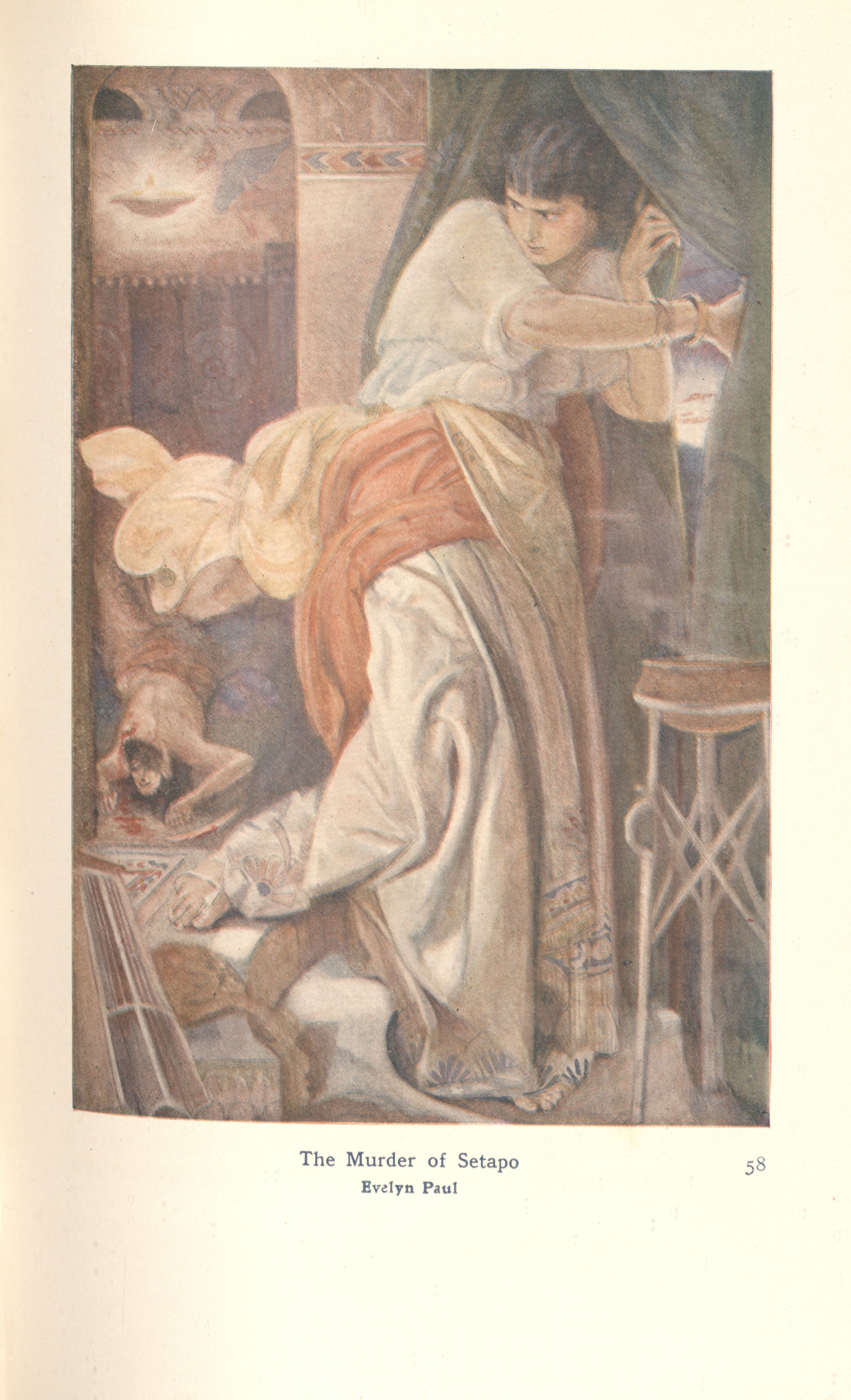
Page from the book

Myths and Legends of Babylonia and Assyria is a book written by Lewis Spence, published in 1916. It comprises 15 chapters, covering the most important and interesting events and figures in the history of Babylonia and Assyria, and provides some historical background.

== Context ==
Spence was a Scottish journalist and scholar with particular interest in folklore and occultism. Before Myths and Legends of Babylonia and Assyria was published, he wrote a series of books investigating myths and legends from other cultures like the Egyptian, Mexican and Peruvian, and the North American Indian culture. His friend Charles Cammell describes Spence as a precise and organized man, something that was also reflected in his literary works.

In 1915 another book was published, also called Myths and Legends of Babylonia and Assyria but written by Donald Alexander Mackenzie.

== Contents ==
The book is not written in chronological order, nor is it intended by the author to provide a full overview of all tales from these two cultures. It is a selection of myths and legends of Babylonia and Assyria that Spence found interesting or considered essential to a popular reader. He aims for this book to be "a popular account of the religion and mythology of ancient Babylonia and Assyria".

The book begins with an introduction chapter, which is also the longest chapter of the book. Here it describes the history of the Babylonia and Assyria, shedding light onto the most significant figures and events. Spence mentions the relevance of this book and the provided background: these ancient societies had a substantial influence on the cultures surrounding them, mainly on law, literature and religion.

One chapter describes the Gilgamesh Epic, a mythical story that dates back to 2150 - 1400 BC and is considered the oldest piece of epic literature, as it predates Homer's Odyssey. There were multiple other tales woven into this myth over time, with slight changes made by the different authors that rewrote the story. In the second upon last chapter Spence describes the modern excavations in Babylonia and Assyria, with 'modern' referring to up until 1916. The book is not only text, but also contains circa 40 images and illustrations.

Throughout the book he makes comparisons to western culture, for example comparing a high priest in one of the tales to an English king. This way he can explain certain figures or events by referring to familiar concepts for an Englishmen. The book is written for the British public, relying on the common knowledge a Brit would have back then, and referring to the English people as ‘us’.

== Reception ==
Myths and Legends of Babylonia and Assyria has received some critical reviews, with multiple pointing toward inaccuracies throughout the book and considering the title to be misleading, as it is mostly a discussion of the religion and history of the two civilizations. One review by Theophile James Meek critiques the book "The book abounds in inaccuracies, hardly pardonable even in one who is not a specialist". He accuses Spence of relying on unreliable sources, misusing certain terms and points out Spence being inconsistent with the spelling of the names of certain important figures. Meek ends his review on some positive notes though, mentioning the book gives on the whole a very fair treatment of the subject and concludes with "It is a pleasure to find a book that has given the Assyrians due credit for the development of their civilization, instead of making it a mere reflection of that of Babylonia, as most writers do."Another review gives credit to the great amount details, but again points out the "inadequate preparation for the work he has undertaken".

Spence has published more than 40 literary works, and has contributed to the revival of the modern neo-pagan witchcraft. His book An Encyclopaedia of Occultism, published in 1920, is still used in the 21st century and considered one of the best books in the folklore and occult scene.
