= Sectionalism =

Loyalty to one's own region of a country

Sectionalism is loyalty to one's own region or section of the country, rather than to the country as a whole. Sectionalism occurs in many countries.

== In the United Kingdom ==
Sectionalism occurs most notably in the constituent nation of Scotland, where various sectionalist/separatist political organizations and parties have existed since the early 1920s, beginning with the Scots National League. Today, Scottish sectionalism is most strongly associated and advocated by the Scottish National Party (SNP), which can be described as both sectionalist and separatist. The SNP advocates for both Scottish independence and more autonomy for Scotland while remaining a part of the United Kingdom.

The phenomenon has also been recognised in Yorkshire with the electoral activity of The Yorkshire Party.

== In the United States ==
Sectionalism in 1800s America refers to the different lifestyles, social structures, customs, and the political values of the North and the South. Regional tensions came to a head during the War of 1812, resulting in the Hartford Convention which manifested New England's dissatisfaction with a foreign trade embargo that affected its industry disproportionately, as well as dilution of Northern power by new western states, and a succession of Southern Presidents. Sectionalism increased steadily in 1800–1850 as the North industrialized, urbanized, and built prosperous factories, while the deep South concentrated on plantation agriculture based on slave labor, together with subsistence farming for poor whites who owned no slaves. Southerners defended slavery in part by claiming that Northern factory workers toiled under worse conditions and were not cared for by their employers. Defenders of slavery referred to factory workers as the "white slaves of the North".

The South expanded into rich new lands in the Southwest (from Alabama to Texas). However, slavery declined in the border states and could barely survive in cities and industrial areas (it was fading out in cities such as Baltimore, Louisville, and St. Louis), so a South based on slavery was rural and non-industrial. On the other hand, as the demand for cotton grew the price of slaves soared, as slaves were considered imperative for the harvest and refinement of cotton. Historians have debated whether economic differences between the industrial Northeast and the agricultural South helped cause the Civil War. Historians now disagree with the economic determinism of historian Charles Beard in the 1920s and emphasize that Northern and Southern economies were largely complementary.

Historians do agree that social and cultural institutions were very different in the North and South. In the South, wealthy white men owned all of the quality land, leaving poor white farmers with marginal lands of low productivity. Fears of slave revolts and abolitionist propaganda made the South militantly hostile to suspicious ideas. Members and politicians of the newly formed Republican Party were extremely critical of Southern society and argued that the system of free labor in place in the North resulted in much more prosperity. Republicans criticizing the Southern system of slavery would commonly cite the larger population growth of the Northern states, alongside their rapid growth in factories, farms, and schools as evidence of the superiority of a free labor system.

Southerners argued that it was the North that was changing and was prone to new "isms", while the South remained true to the historic republican values of the Founding Fathers (many of whom owned slaves, including Washington, Jefferson, and Madison). The issue of accepting slavery (in the guise of rejecting slave-owning bishops and missionaries) split the largest religious denominations (the Methodist, Baptist, and Presbyterian churches) into separate Northern and Southern denominations. Industrialization meant that seven out of eight European immigrants settled in the North. The movement of twice as many whites leaving the South for the North contributed to the South's defensive-aggressive political behavior.

The Western United States was also growing due to the innovations of the railway system and the massive boom in the steel industry. The expansion of the railway system paved the way for agriculturists to produce wool and grain. Westerners were able to develop their own strong sectional identity and embrace their region's uniqueness while the Easterners looked down on the Westerners.

== In Spain ==
Sectionalism can be found in the Spanish regions of Catalonia, the Spanish portion of the Basque Country, Galicia, and Andalusia.

== In Ukraine ==
After the dissolution of the Soviet Union in 1991, Ukraine became its own unitary state, however, also containing regions heavily populated by Russians. This caused a few rebellions throughout the eastern parts of the nation, taking place in the self-declared republics of the Donetsk People's Republic, the Luhansk People's Republic, and the peninsula of Crimea. Crimea is disputed by both Ukraine and the Russian Federation. Many nations oppose Russia's annexation of Crimea.

== In Canada ==
In 1977, the province of Quebec started an independence movement from Canada, wanting to be an independent French-speaking nation. There were two referendums (1980 and 1995) for whether Quebec would stay as a province of Canada or become its own nation. Both of these referendums failed, keeping Quebec under the governance of the Canadian government. In the north, the Canadian government had given the indigenous Inuit peoples throughout the Yukon, Northwest Territories and Nunavut a certain amount of self-governance, allowing them to maintain their cultural practices.

== See also ==
- Separatism
- Autonomism (political doctrine)
- Homeland
- Identity politics
- Intersectionality
- Language secessionism
- Micronation
- Secession
