= Myths and Legends of Babylonia and Assyria =

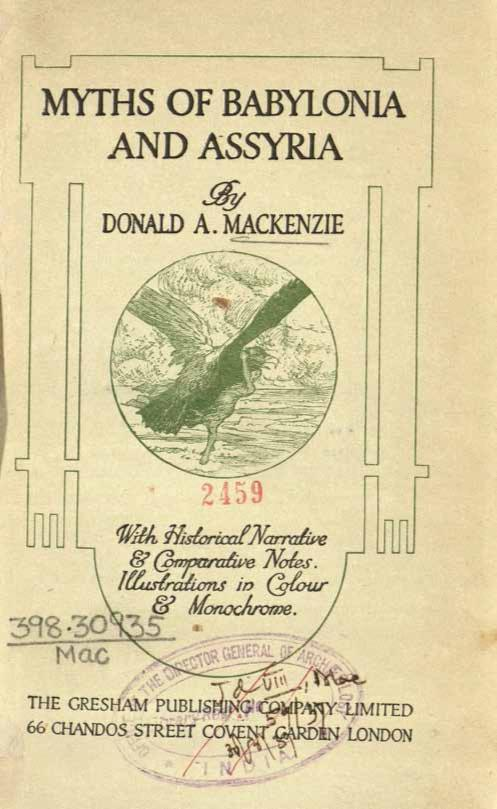
The book's internal cover image.

Myths of Babylonia and Assyria is a book by Donald Alexander Mackenzie published in 1915. The book discusses not only the mythology of Babylonia and Assyria, but also the history of the region (Mesopotamia), biblical accounts similar to the region's mythology, and comparisons to the mythologies of other cultures, such as those of India and northern Europe.

== Contents ==
The book contains several plates in colour of illustrations by the famous Ernest Wallcousins which depict different scenes of Babylonian and Assyrian religion, such as The temptation of Ea-Bani, The Shepherd fins the babe Semiramis, and The Babylonian Deluge. Other monochrome plates are also included, and these mostly depict illustrations or photographs of figures such as the Winged Human-Headed Cow, a small stone sculpture that depicts the Assyrian god Lamassu.

Similar to Lewis Spence's book on the topic, it covers mythology, history, culture and even race of ancient Mesopotamia, including some translations of ancient hymns to gods and goddesses. In the introduction, Mackenzie talks about early European archaeological expeditions to Mesopotamia, and the broad archaeological history of the region since the 18th century. The theme of race is heavily touched on in the book, such as the 16th chapter titled "Race Movements that Shattered Empires" which goes in-depth about how the migration of different peoples affected Mesopotamian history and human history as a whole.

== See also ==
- A book on the same topic and theme: Myths and Legends of Babylonia and Assyria (1916), Lewis Spence
- Babylonian religion
- Ancient Mesopotamian religion
