= John Kevan McDowall =

John Kevan McDowall (16 March 1891 - 2 September 1958) was a Scottish solicitor and politician during the early 20th century. He lived and practiced as a solicitor in Glasgow for the majority of his life. He was the first and only leader of the Scottish Party, which later merged with the National Party of Scotland (NPS) to form the Scottish National Party (SNP) in 1934.

== Family ==
McDowall was the son of John Kevan McDowall (1861-1928), secretary of the Scottish Football Association, and Helen Paterson. He was a descendant of the Kevan family. While their heritage is uncertain, in his own book, Carrick Gallovidian, McDowall presents the theory that the family originated in Wigtown Bay, near Galloway, as early as the fifteenth century ("[the family] occurs in a charter of 1421 as Cavens").

== Political life ==
McDowall became a member of the Unionist Party, the Glasgow Unionist Association (GUA) and the Cathcart Unionist Association (CUA). In June 1932 the CUA made him Chairman of an 'Imperial Committee', which was in favour of Scottish home rule. The committee organised meetings to support home rule, it also produced a manifesto that proposed replacing the Westminster Parliament with an Imperial one, where representatives from the Empire would all convene. The manifesto also proposed the establishment of separate Parliaments for Scotland, England and Wales.

This provoked outrage from the Unionist Party and McDowall was accused of disloyalty and unconstitutional practices. McDowall, joined by over thirty other pro- Home Rule rebels, resigned from the Unionist Party to found the Scottish Party. The Scottish Party was a center-right, liberal conservative party which was pro-Imperial Federalism and pro-Scottish Independence. Many high standing members of Scottish society enlisted to the party, including James Graham, 6th Duke of Montrose (who was made the party's chairman), John Bannerman, Sir Henry Keith, Sir Daniel Stevenson and Sir Alexander MacEwan. As the party never actually fielded any candidates, it acted as more of a think tank than a political party, its membership never exceeded 1000.

In 1933 the party received correspondence from John MacCormick, leader of the National Party of Scotland, a much larger nationalist party that had been founded in 1928. After a meeting in Hillhead, Glasgow, on 13 December, 1933, the two parties decided to merge, becoming the Scottish National Party. McDowall took a far less senior role in this new party, although is listed as a founding member of the party by Girvan Mckay in his 'The Lion and the Saltire: A Brief History of the Scottish National Party'.

In his later life McDowall devoted more of his time to The Galloway Association of Glasgow, of which he was president from 1957 to 1958.

== Bibliography ==
- A Genealogical History in Cartographic Form Pertaining to Galloway and Its Ancient Division of Carrick: From Early Recorded Periods of Scottish, British and Scandinavian Histories, Down to (generally) the Date of Compilation Hereof (1938)... Collated and Compiled... (1938)
- Carrick Gallovidian: A Historical Survey of the Ancient Lordship of Galloway, with Original Translations of the Place-names and Genealogical Charts and Notes Pertaining Principally to Its Ancient Division of Carrick. Also Relative Notes and Translations Pertaining (1947)
