= 1995 City of Dundee Council election =

1995 Scottish local government election

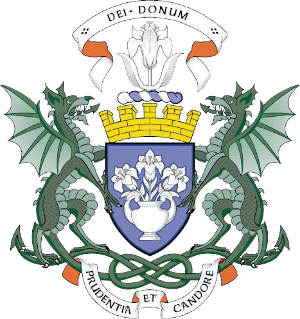
← 1992	6 April 1995	1999 →

All 36 seats to City of Dundee Council 19 seats needed for a majority
- Turnout: 44.5%
	First party	Second party
Party	Labour	Conservative
Last election	26 seats, 36.5%	12 seats, 29.1%
Seats won	28	4
Seat change	▲2	▼8
Popular vote	26,929	6,926
Percentage	54.2%	13.9%
Swing	▲17.7%	▼15.1%
	Third party	Fourth party
Party	SNP	Independent
Last election	6 seats, 31.2%	0 seats
Seats won	3	1
Seat change	▼3	▲1
Popular vote	12,512	1,852
Percentage	25.2%	3.7%
Swing	▼6.0%	▲
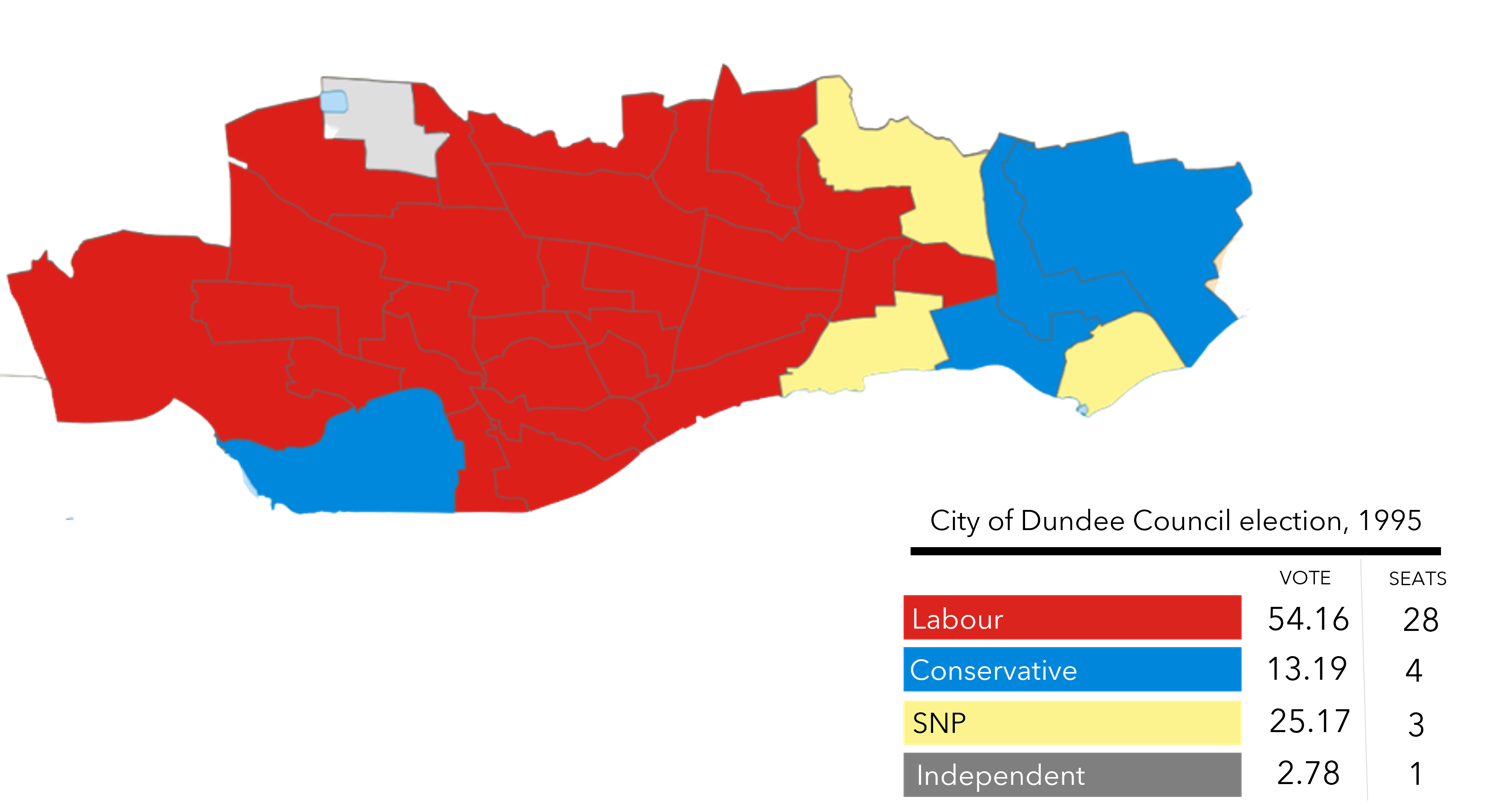
- The 36 single-member wards

Council Leader after election
TBD

The 1995 City of Dundee Council election took place on 6 April 1995 to elect members of City of Dundee Council, as part of that year's Scottish local elections. These were the first elections for the new unitary authority of the City of Dundee Council. The council subsequently renamed itself in May 1995 as Dundee City Council.

== Results ==
1995 City of Dundee Council election result
Party	Seats	Gains	Losses	Net gain/loss	Seats %	Votes %	Votes	+/−
Labour	28	-	-	▲2	77.8	54.2	26,929	▲17.7
Conservative	4	-	-	▼8	11.1	13.9	6,926	▼15.1
SNP	3	-	-	▼3	8.3	25.2	12,512	▼6.0
Independent	1	-	-	▲1	2.8	3.7	1,852	
Liberal Democrats	0	-	-	Steady	0.0	2.5	1,254	▲1.4
Scottish Militant Labour	0	-	-	Steady	0.0	0.9	465	
Communist (PCC)	0	-	-	Steady	0.0	0.2	72	
