= 1977 City of Dundee District Council election =

1977 Scottish local government election

The 1977 City of Dundee District Council election was held on 3 May 1977, alongside elections to the councils of Scotland's 53 other districts.

== Results ==
1977 City of Dundee District Council election result
Party	Seats	Gains	Losses	Net gain/loss	Seats %	Votes %	Votes	+/−
Conservative	21			▲3	47.7	46.9	26,848	▲4.7
Labour	20			▼2	45.5	38.2	21,883	▼9.2
Independent Labour	1			Steady	2.3	3.6	2,033	▲0.6
Independent	1			▼1	2.3	2.2	1,270	▼1.1
Monifieth Ratepayer	1			▲1	2.3	1.7	998	New
SLP	0			Steady	0.0	2.5	1,422	New
Liberal	0			Steady	0.0	2.2	1,254	Steady
Communist	0			Steady	0.0	1.1	613	Steady
Independent Moderate	0			Steady	0.0	0.8	477	New
Independent Nationalist	0			Steady	0.0	0.4	246	New
Independent Ratepayer	0			Steady	0.0	0.4	207	New

Note: there were only 43 seats at the last election in 1974
