= Lewis Spence =

British academic (1874–1955)

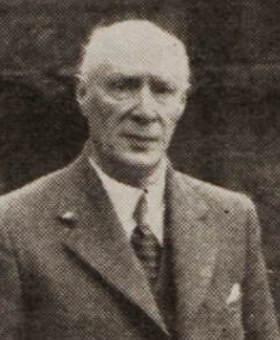
- Born: 25 November 1874; Monifieth, Angus, Scotland
- Died: 3 March 1955 (aged 80); Edinburgh, Scotland
- Occupations: Journalist, folklorist, occult scholar
- Writing career
- Subjects: Scottish folklore, old British, German, and Aztec mythology, Atlantis

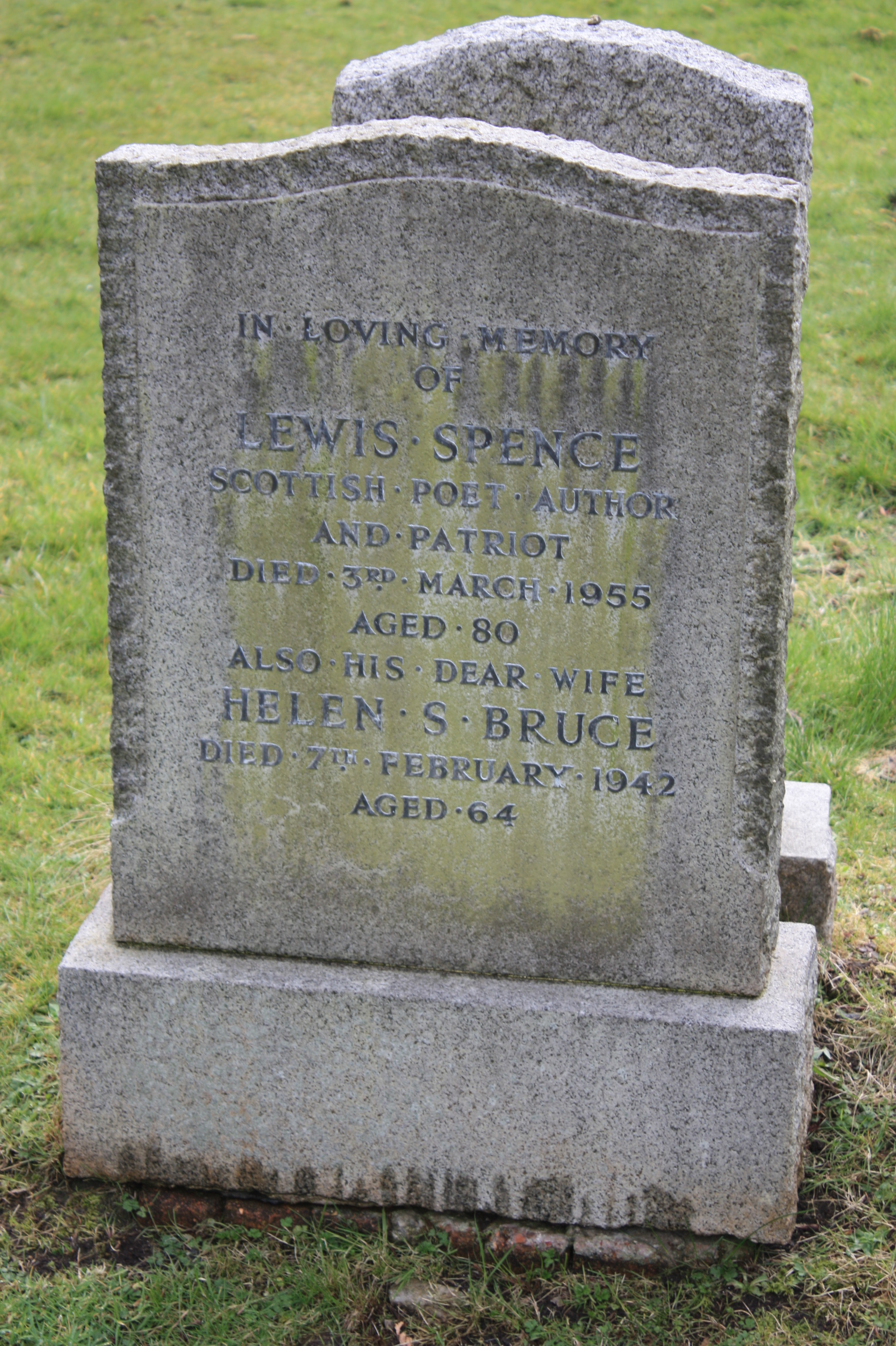
The grave of Lewis Spence, Dean Cemetery

James Lewis Thomas Chalmers Spence (25 November 1874 – 3 March 1955) was a Scottish journalist, poet, author, folklorist and occult scholar. Spence was a Fellow of the Royal Anthropological Institute of Great Britain and Ireland, and vice-president of the Scottish Anthropological and Folklore Society. He founded the Scottish National Movement.

== Early life ==
Spence was born in 1874 in Monifieth, Angus, Scotland. After graduating from Edinburgh University he pursued a career in journalism. He was an editor at The Scotsman 1899–1906, editor of The Edinburgh Magazine for a year, 1904–05, and then an editor at The British Weekly, 1906–09.

== Career ==
In this time Spence's interest was sparked in the myth and folklore of Mexico and Central America, resulting in his popularisation of the Mayan Popol Vuh, the sacred book of the Quiché Mayans (1908). He compiled A Dictionary of Mythology (1910), an Encyclopedia of occultism and parapsychology (1920) and numerous additional volumes.

Turning his interest closer to home, he investigated Scottish folklore. An ardent Scottish Nationalist, he unsuccessfully contested a parliamentary seat for Midlothian and Peebles Northern at a by-election in 1929. He also wrote poetry, collected in 1953.

Spence wrote about Brythonic rites and traditions in Mysteries of Celtic Britain (1905). In this book, Spence theorized that the original Britons were descendants of a people that migrated from Northwest Africa and were probably related to the Berbers and the Basques.

== Atlantis ==
Spence's research into the mythology and culture of the New World, together with his examination of the cultures of western Europe and north-west Africa, led him to the question of Atlantis. During the 1920s he published a series of books which sought to rescue the topic from the occultists who had more or less brought it into disrepute. These works, including The Problem of Atlantis (1924) and History of Atlantis (1927), adopted theories inaugurated by Ignatius Donnelly and looked at the lost island as a Bronze Age civilization that formed a cultural link with the New World, which he invoked through examples he found of parallels between the early civilizations of the Old and New Worlds. Despite Spence's erudition and the width of his reading, the conclusions he reached, avoiding peer-reviewed journals, have been almost universally rejected by mainstream scholarship. His popularisations met stiff criticism in professional journals, but his continued appeal among theory hobbyists is summed up by a reviewer of The Problem of Atlantis (1924) in The Geographical Journal: "Mr. Spence is an industrious writer, and, even if he fails to convince, has done service in marshalling the evidence and has produced an entertaining volume which is well worth reading." Nevertheless, he seems to have had some influence upon the ideas of controversial author Immanuel Velikovsky, and as his books have come into the public domain, they have been successfully reprinted and some have been scanned for the Internet.

Spence's 1940 book Occult Causes of the Present War (ISBN 0766100510) is an early book in the field of Nazi occultism.

== Personal life ==
In 1899 he married Helen Bruce.

Over his long career, he published more than forty books, many of which remain in print to this day. Spence was also the founder of the Scottish National Movement which later merged to form the National Party of Scotland and which in turn merged to form the Scottish National Party.

== Death ==
Spence died in Edinburgh in 1955 aged 80 and is buried in the north-west section of the 20th century northern extension to Dean Cemetery in western Edinburgh. His wife, Helen S. Bruce (d. 1942) lies with him.

== Selected works ==
Ancient Britain

- The Mysteries of Britain: Secret Rites and Traditions of Ancient Britain Restored, (1905, reprinted 1994) London: Senate. ISBN 1-85958-057-2
- The Magic Arts in Celtic Britain, (1949, Reprint 1999) Dover Publications, ISBN 0-486-40447-1
- Celtic Spells and Charms, (Reprint 2005) Kessinger Publishing ISBN 1-4253-1046-X
- The History and Origins of Druidism, 1949

Occult

- An Encyclopaedia of Occultism: A compendium of information on the occult sciences, occult personalities, psychic science, magic, demonology, spiritism and mysticism, (1920, Reprinted 2003) Dover Publications, ISBN 0-486-42613-0
- Occult Causes of the Present War, (1940, Reprint 1997) Kessinger Publishing, ISBN 0-7661-0051-0
- Second Sight: Its History and Origins, Rider 1951

Atlantis and other lost worlds

- The Problem of Atlantis, London, 1924
- Atlantis in America, London: Ernest Benn, 1925
- The History of Atlantis (1927, Reprinted 1995) Adventures Unlimited Press, ISBN 0-932813-28-3
- The Occult Sciences in Atlantis, (Reprinted 1976) Mokelumne Hill Press, ISBN 0-7873-1292-4
- The Atlantis of Plato
- The Evidence For Lemuria From Myth And Magic
- The Problem of Lemuria: The Sunken Continent of the Pacific, London: Rider & Co., 1932

Mythology

- The Popul Vuh: The Mythic and Heroic Sagas of the Kiches of Central America, London, David Nutt, 1908
- A Dictionary of Mythology, 1910
- The Myths of Mexico and Peru (1913, Reprinted 1976) Longwood, ISBN 0-89341-031-4
- The Myths of the North American Indians, London: George G. Harrap & Co, 1914
- Myths and Legends of Babylonia and Assyria (New York:Stokes) 1917; (Reprint 1997) Kessinger Publishing, ISBN 1-56459-500-5
- The Legends and Romances of Spain ca. 1920
- An Introduction to Mythology George G. Harrap & Co., 1921
- The Gods of Mexico, Fisher Unwin Ltd., 1923
- The Mysteries of Egypt, or, The Secret Rites and Traditions of the Nile, 1929
- The Magic and Mysteries of Mexico, 1932
- Legends and Romances of Brittany, 1917
- The Minor Traditions of British Mythology, 1948, London: Rider & Co OCLC 535883, Reprinted 1972, Benjamin Blom, Inc ISBN 0-405-08989-9
- The Outlines of Mythology, 1944
- British Fairy Origins: The Genesis and Development of Fairy Legends in British Tradition, London: Watts & Co., 1946
- Fairy Tradition in Britain, (1948, Reprint 1997) Kessinger Publishing ISBN 1-56459-516-1
- Hero Tales and Legends of the Rhine
- Ancient Egyptian Myths and Legends, (Reprint 1990) Dover, ISBN 0-486-26525-0
- Scottish Ghosts and Goblins, 1952

Poetry

- Collected Poems of Lewis Spence, 1953

== See also ==
- Donald Alexander Mackenzie
- David MacRitchie
- Henry O'Brien
