= 1974 City of Dundee District Council election =

City of Dundee District Council election

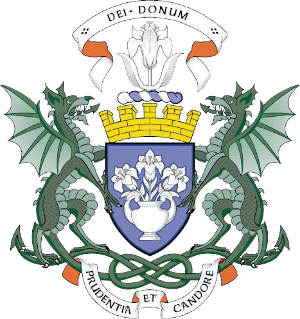
- 8 May 1974

All 44 seats to City of Dundee District Council 23 seats needed for a majority
	First party	Second party	Third party
Party	Labour	Conservative	Independent
Seats won	22	18	2
Council Leader after election
TBD

Elections to City of Dundee District Council were held on 7 May 1974, on the same day as the other Scottish local government elections. This was the first election to the district council following the implementation of the Local Government (Scotland) Act 1973.

The election used the 44 wards created by the Formation Electoral Arrangements in 1974. Each ward elected one councillor using first-past-the-post voting.

Labour took control of the council after winning a majority. The party took 22 of the 44 seats and almost half of the popular vote. The Conservatives were the second largest party after winning 18 seats.

== Background ==
Dundee was made a burgh in the late 12th century and officially became Scotland's first city in 1889. Following the local government reforms in 1890, Dundee one of the four Counties of Cities and was administratively separate from the county it was historically within – Angus.

Following the recommendations in the Wheatly Report, the old system of counties and burghs – which had resulted in a mishmash of local government areas in which some small burghs had larger populations but far fewer responsibilities than some large burghs and even counties – was to be replaced by a new system of regional and district councils. The Local Government (Scotland) Act 1973 implemented most of the recommendations in the Wheatly Report. The City of Dundee District Council – placed within the Tayside region – took in a much larger area than its predecessor as the burgh of Monifieth and an area from Angus and Perthshire was incorporated within the city.

Following the death of a candidate, the poll in Craigiebank was postponed and the seat was vacant following the election.

== Results ==
1974 City of Dundee District Council election result
Party	Seats	Gains	Losses	Net gain/loss	Seats %	Votes %	Votes	+/−
Labour	22				51.2	47.4	29,555	
Conservative	18				40.9	42.2	26,320	
Independent	2				4.5	3.3	2,076	
Independent Labour	1				2.3	3.0	1,860	
Liberal	0				0.0	2.2	1,359	
Communist	0				0.0	1.1	677	
SNP	0				0.0	0.5	291	
Christian Democratic Socialist	0				0.0	0.3	161	
Ind. Socialist	0				0.0	0.2	106	
Vacant	1				0.0	0.0		

== Aftermath ==
The City of Dundee was the only district in the newly created Tayside region that was won by Labour after the party took 22 of the 43 seats up for election. The Conservatives took 18 seats and three Independent candidates – including an Independent Labour candidate – were elected. The regional council, which held its first election on the same day, was left in no overall control. Across Scotland, Labour won the most votes, the most seats and the most councils of any party.
