= 1992 City of Dundee District Council election =

1992 Scottish local government election

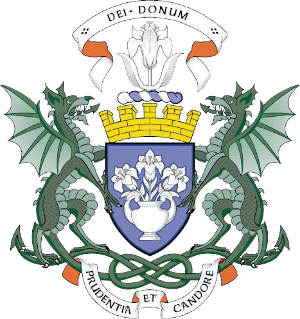
← 1988	7 May 1992	1995 →

All 44 seats to City of Dundee District Council 23 seats needed for a majority
- Turnout: 40.2%
	First party	Second party	Third party
Party	Labour	Conservative	SNP
Last election	30 seats, 47.3%	10 seats, 22.6%	4 seats, 25.3%
Seats won	26	12	6
Seat change	▼4	▲2	▲2
Popular vote	20,027	15,946	17,101
Percentage	36.5%	29.1%	31.2%
Swing	▼10.8%	▲6.5%	▲5.9%
- The 44 single-member wards

- Composition of the district council after the election

The 1992 City of Dundee District Council election took place in May 1992 to elect members of City of Dundee Council, as part of that year's Scottish local elections.

== Results ==
1992 City of Dundee District Council election result
Party	Seats	Gains	Losses	Net gain/loss	Seats %	Votes %	Votes	+/−
Labour	26			▼4	59.1	36.5	20,027	▼10.8
Conservative	12			▲2	27.3	29.1	15,946	▲6.5
SNP	6			▲2	13.6	31.2	17,101	▲5.9
Liberal Democrats	0	0		Steady	0.0	1.2	640	▼2.1
Scottish Green	0	0		Steady	0.0	1.0	566	New
Other parties	0	0			0.00	1.07	589	
