= John Adair McDowell (major) =

American lawyer

John Adair McDowell (May 6, 1789 - October 1, 1823) was an American military officer and judge. He was a major during the War of 1812. He was an aide to General Isaac Shelby during the Battle of the Thames and was with General Samuel Hopkins during his expeditions against the Illinois Indians. After the war, McDowell served in the Ohio Legislature and was appointed Judge of the Circuit Court for the Columbus District.
