= 1988 City of Dundee District Council election =

1988 Scottish local government election

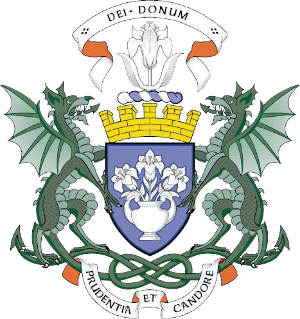
← 1984	5 May 1988	1992 →

All 44 seats to City of Dundee District Council 23 seats needed for a majority
- Turnout: 51.1%
	First party	Second party	Third party
Party	Labour	Conservative	SNP
Seats won	30	10	4
Popular vote	33,200	15,875	17,762
Percentage	47.3%	22.6%	25.3%

The 1988 City of Dundee District Council election took place on 5 May 1988 to elect members of City of Dundee Council, as part of that year's Scottish local elections.

== Results ==
1988 City of Dundee District Council election result
Party	Seats	Gains	Losses	Net gain/loss	Seats %	Votes %	Votes	+/−
Labour	30				68.2	47.3	33,200	
Conservative	10				22.7	22.6	15,875	
SNP	4				9.1	25.3	17,762	
Independent	0				0.0			
Independent Labour	0				0.0			
SSLD	0				0.0	3.3	2,295	
Communist	0				0.0			
