= Donald Alexander Mackenzie =

Scottish journalist and folklorist (1873–1936)

Donald Alexander Mackenzie (24 July 1873 – 2 March 1936) was a Scottish journalist and folklorist and a prolific writer on religion, mythology and anthropology in the early 20th century.

== Life and career ==
Mackenzie was born in Cromarty, son of A.H. Mackenzie and Isobel Mackay. He became a journalist in Glasgow and in 1903 moved to Dingwall as owner and editor of The North Star. His next move, in 1910, was to the People's Journal in Dundee. From 1916 he represented the Glasgow paper, The Bulletin, in Edinburgh. As well as writing books, articles and poems, he often gave lectures, and also broadcast talks on Celtic mythology. He was the friend of many specialist authorities in his areas of interest. His older brother was William Mackay Mackenzie, Secretary of the Royal Commission on Ancient and Historical Monuments of Scotland between 1913 and 1935. He died in Edinburgh on 2 March 1936 and was buried in Cromarty.

== Theories ==
=== Neolithic matriarchy ===
In one of his key works, Myths of Crete and Pre-Hellenic Europe (1917), Mackenzie argued that across Europe during Neolithic times, pre-Indo-European societies were matriarchal and woman-centered (gynocentric), where goddesses were venerated but that the Bronze Age Indo-European patriarchal ("androcratic") culture supplanted it. Mackenzie's matristic theories were notably influential to Marija Gimbutas. He also believed that the Neolithic matriarchy was as far north as Scotland, writing an article in the Celtic Review called "A Highland Goddess" attempting to trace the very early presence of goddess worship.

=== Buddhist diffusionism ===
Mackenzie was a diffusionist. He believed specifically that Buddhists colonised the globe in ancient antiquity and were responsible for spreading the swastika. In his Buddhism in Pre-Christian Britain (1928) he developed the theory that Buddhists were in Britain and Scandinavia long before the spread of Christianity. His main evidence can be summarised as follows:

- The Gundestrup bowl "on which the Celtic god, Cernunnos, is postured like a typical Buddha".
- Gaulish coins with seated figures like Buddha.
- The testimony of Asoka, who launched Buddhist activities into Europe.
- Origen's statement of Buddhist doctrines in ancient Britain.

The work received a mixed reception. Professor of Philosophy Vergilius Ferm reviewed the work positively, but other scholars criticised it for its lack of evidence.

=== Racial origin of British ===
In 1922, Mackenzie published Ancient Man in Britain, a work covering the history of Britain from Upper Paleolithic times, from a strong ethnological basis. The foreword of the book was written by Grafton Elliot Smith. The work covers the earliest settlement of Britain by the first modern humans from around 35,000 years ago during the Aurignacian (pp. 19–27). In the book, Mackenzie maintains that the Caucasoid Cro-Magnons who settled in Britain were dark haired and dark eyed, racially akin to the French Basques, Iberians and Berbers of North Africa (p. 25), who he theorised were one of the earliest representatives of the Mediterranean race. This indigenous proto-Mediterranean racial stock was later invaded by another "variety of the Mediterranean race" who initiated the Solutrean culture around 20,000 years ago (p. 50).

According to Mackenzie, the Aurignacian and Solutrean peoples of Britain traded in shells with Cro-Magnons of France. They later intermingled with later arriving Caucasoid racial types, including the proto-Alpines (Furfooz race), who were brachycephalic (broad-skulled) and a Lappid race, who had minor Eskimo phenotypic traits. Mackenzie also believed that there was a highly depigmented racial type in small numbers in Britain during the Magdalenian, perhaps who were also blonde, who intermingled with the "dark Iberians" (p. 60). Mackenzie believed that during the Neolithic, the predominant racial type of Britain continued to be Mediterranoid: "The carriers of Neolithic culture were in the main Iberians of Mediterranean racial type" (p. 126) who traded in pearls and ores. Regarding Bronze Age Britain, Mackenzie devoted several chapters supporting his theory that traders and "prospectors" (miners) arrived in Britain c. 2500 BC, originally from the Eastern Mediterranean (pp. 98–101). This theory was initially developed by Harold Peake, who coined the term "Prospector Theory". In the scientific literature of Carleton S. Coon (1939), the theory was revived, and the Mediterraneans who colonised Britain during the late Neolithic or Bronze Age were associated with the Medway megaliths (or long-barrow Megalithic culture). Joseph Deniker earlier called these colonists "Atlanto-Mediterranean".

Mackenzie believed that these Mediterraneans who colonised parts of Britain survived well into later historic periods (p. 118) and that the Mediterranean race in general was the bulk racial stock of Britain from Paleolithic through to the Neolithic and to more recent periods. They had black or brown hair, and swarthy skin "like those of the Southern Italians" (p. 126) and have survived in numerous pockets of Britain to the modern day (p. 139) despite that the later Anglo-Saxon and Norse settlement, who were fairer in appearance, Mackenzie believed their genetic input or admixture was very limited but that they subjugated the British imposing a new civilization and culture (p. 227).

== Works ==
- Elves and Heroes (1909) (tales and poems)
- Finn and his warrior band;: Or, Tales of old Alban (1911)
- Indian Myth and Legend (1912)
- Teutonic Myth and Legend (1912, 2nd Ed. 1934)
- Donald Alexander, Mackenzie (1913). Indian myth and legend. Gresham, London.
- Egyptian Myth and Legend (1913)
- Myths and Legends of Babylonia and Assyria (1915); online editions: gutenberg.org, sacred-texts.com, wisdomlib.org
- Indian Fairy Stories (1915)
- Brave deeds of the War (1915)
- Heroes and Heroic Deeds of the Great War (1915)
- Great deeds of the Great war (1916)
- Stories of Russian Folk-Life (1916)
- Lord Kitchener, the story of his life and work (1916)
- From all the Fronts (1917)
- Wonder tales from Scottish Myth and Legend (1917)
- Myths of Crete and Pre-Hellenic Europe (1917)
- The World's Heritage of Epical, Heroic And Romantic Literature Volume I (1918)
- The World's Heritage of Epical, Heroic And Romantic Literature Volume II (1919)
- Sons & daughters of the Motherland (1919)
- The Story of the Great War (1920)
- Sons & daughters of Canada (1920)
- Ancient Man in Britain (1922)
- Myths of Pre-Columbian America (1924)
- Tales from the Northern Sagas (1926)
- The Gods of the Classics (1926)
- The Story of Ancient Crete (80-page booklet, 1927)
- The Story of Ancient Egypt (80-page booklet, 1927)
- The Story of Ancient Babylonia and Assyria (80-page booklet, 1927)
- Buddhism in Pre-Christian Britain (1928)
- Myths of China and Japan (1924, 2nd Ed. 1930)
- Tales from the Moors and the Mountains (1931)
- Ancient England (pamphlet, 1931)
- Myths and Traditions of the South Sea Islands (1931)
- The Migration of Symbols and their Relations to Beliefs and Customs (1926)
- Footprints of Early Man (1927)
- Ancient civilizations from the earliest times to the birth of Christ (1927)
- Burmese Wonder Tales (1929)
- Scotland: the ancient kingdom (1930)
- Some Makers of History (1930)
- Myths from Melanesia and Indonesia (1930, 2nd Ed. 1933)
- Scottish folk-lore and folk life (1935)
- Songs of the Highlands and the islands (1936)

== Biography ==
- The Scotsman, 3 March 1936

== See also ==
- Lewis Spence
- David MacRitchie
- John Stuart Stuart-Glennie
- Gundestrup cauldron
- John Rhys
- Scottish pork taboo
