= John McDowell (disambiguation) =

John McDowell (born 1942) is a South African philosopher.

John McDowell may also refer to:

- John McDowell (American football) (born 1942), American football player
- John McDowell (bishop) (born 1956), bishop of Clogher in the Church of Ireland
- John McDowell (footballer) (born 1951), English footballer
- John McDowell (Manitoba politician) (1894–1980), Canadian politician from Manitoba
- John McDowell (Pennsylvania politician) (1902–1957), American politician from Pennsylvania
- John A. McDowell (1853–1927), American politician from Ohio
- John Bernard McDowell (1921–2010), auxiliary bishop of the Roman Catholic Diocese of Pittsburgh, Pennsylvania
- John G. McDowell (1794–1866), New York politician
- John Holmes McDowell (born 1946), American folklorist
- John William McDowell (c. 1922–2006), Northern Irish political activist
- Johnny McDowell (1915–1952), American racecar driver
- John M. McDowell (1965-2024), Virginia Tech Professor of Plant Pathology

== See also ==
- Jack McDowell (born 1966), baseball player
- Josh McDowell (born 1939), an evangelical Christian apologist and evangelist
