= Scottish Party =

Scottish (Self-Government) Party
- Leader: John Kevan McDowall
- Chairman: James Graham, 6th Duke of Montrose
- Founded: November 1932
- Dissolved: 7 April 1934
- Split from: Unionist Party
- Merged into: Scottish National Party
- Membership: <1,000
- Ideology: Scottish nationalism Scottish independence Imperial federalism
- Political position: Centre-right

The Scottish (Self-Government) Party was a Scottish nationalist political party formed in 1932 by a group of members of the Unionist Party who favoured the establishment of a Dominion Scottish Parliament within the British Empire. The Scottish Party differed from the existing National Party of Scotland (NPS) on the grounds that the NPS and the form of Scottish independence it advocated was ambiguous about the Empire, and they also disagreed with the left-of-centre platform of the NPS.

== Origins ==
The Scottish Party emerged in November 1932 as a breakaway from the Cathcart Unionist Association in Glasgow. In June that same year, members of the Association had set up an 'Imperial Committee', which was a pro-Scottish Home Rule front. The committee arranged meetings, made statements in support of Home Rule, and produced a manifesto which proposed replacing the Westminster Parliament with an Imperial Parliament, containing representatives from the British Empire, and establishing dominion Parliaments for Scotland, England, and Wales. This provoked outrage amongst the leadership of the Unionist Party, who were opposed to the establishment of a Scottish Parliament.

John Kevan McDowall, a Glasgow solicitor and the chairman of the committee, was accused by the Glasgow Unionist Association of disloyalty and unconstitutional practices. McDowall, Andrew Dewar Gibb, and around thirty other pro-Home Rule rebels resigned from the Unionist Party and founded the Scottish Party.

== Activities ==
McDowall and Gibb were able to enlist the support of James Graham, 6th Duke of Montrose (who became the party's chairman) and Sir Alexander MacEwen, both champions of moderate Home Rule. Broadly, the Scottish Party consisted mainly of Unionist and Liberal elements (a mixture of lairds, provosts and business people). The party also included some distinguished figures in Scottish public life, such as John Bannerman, Sir Henry Keith and Sir Daniel Stevenson. The Scottish Party functioned more as a think tank than as an active political party. Its membership was less than 1,000, and it fielded one candidate, MacEwen, only in the 1933 Kilmarnock by-election. He was backed by the National Party of Scotland (NPS) but came fourth with 6,098 votes.

== Merger ==
By 1933 the Scottish Party had received overtures from John MacCormick, secretary of the NPS, who sought to negotiate a merger between the two parties in order to unify these two elements of the Scottish independence movement. Gibb was especially enthusiastic about the merger, but it was met with scepticism from McDowell. In 1934 the NPS and Scottish Party merged to form the Scottish National Party.
