= Scots National League =

Political organization which campaigned for Scottish independence in the 1920s

- Predecessor: Highland Land League and the National Committee
- Successor: National Party of Scotland
- Formation: 1921; 105 years ago
- Founder: Ruaraidh Erskine of Marr and William Gillies
- Founded at: London
- Dissolved: 1928; 98 years ago
- Type: Political organisation
- Purpose: Campaigned for Scottish independence
- Members: <1000
- Main organ: Scots Independent

The Scots National League (SNL) was a political organisation which campaigned for Scottish independence in the 1920s. It amalgamated with other Scottish nationalist bodies in 1928 to form the National Party of Scotland.

The Scots National League was formed in London in 1921, out of the Highland Land League and the National Committee, by Ruaraidh Erskine of Marr and William Gillies. Eschewing the existing system of government of Scotland from Westminster, the SNL adopted an uncompromising programme for independence in preference to Home Rule. Its inspiration was the tradition of Gaelic independence and self-determination. The revolutionary socialist John Maclean chaired one of the SNL's early meetings in Arbroath.

By 1925, and partly influenced by the abstentionist tactics of Sinn Féin, the Scots National League had decided to contest elections, hoping to induce a majority of Scottish MPs to withdraw from the Westminster Parliament to convene an independent Scottish Parliament in Edinburgh. The SNL also established the Scots Independent newspaper in 1926 to further their aims.

From 1927 onwards, the SNL began to campaign for a Scottish national party. Together with its participation in the electoral process, this change made easier its liaison with the Scottish Home Rule Association, and its subsequent merger into the National Party of Scotland (NPS).

By the time of the formation of the NPS, the Scots National League had outgrown its London roots and become stronger in Scotland, largely due to the influence of Tom Gibson. Gibson had realised that nationalist politics needed to be connected to everyday issues in order to become popular. This strain of thought was prominent within the NPS and many former Scots National League members drifted from it due to their belief that the NPS was too moderate. This included Ruairidh Erskine himself, who drifted entirely from politics.

The SNL had a number of branches but its membership never exceeded 1000.
