= National Party of Scotland =

Defunct Scottish nationalist party

- Founded: 23 June 1928
- Dissolved: 7 April 1934
- Preceded by: Scots National League; Scottish National Movement; Glasgow University Scottish Nationalist Association
- Merged into: Scottish National Party
- Ideology: Scottish nationalism Scottish independence
- Political position: Centre-left

The National Party of Scotland (NPS) was a centre-left political party in Scotland which was one of the predecessors of the current Scottish National Party (SNP). The NPS was the first Scottish nationalist political party, and the first which campaigned for Scottish self-determination.

The National Party of Scotland was founded in 1928 by the amalgamation of the Scots National League (SNL), the Scottish National Movement (SNM) and the Glasgow University Scottish Nationalist Association (GUSNA). The NPS emerged from the consensus among members of these groups, and the Scottish Home Rule Association, that an independent political party, free of any connections to any existing parties, was the best way forward for achieving Scottish Home Rule.

The NPS contested the 1929 and 1931 United Kingdom general elections, and a number of by-elections. In 1934 the NPS merged with the Scottish Party to form the Scottish National Party (SNP).

== Origins and history ==
The NPS was formed in 1928 after John MacCormick of the Glasgow University Scottish Nationalist Association called a meeting of all those favouring the establishment of a party favouring Scottish Home Rule. The meeting was presided over by Robert Bontine Cunninghame Graham, who had been a Liberal Party, then Scottish Labour Party politician. The NPS was formed by the amalgamation of GUSNA with the Scots National League, Lewis Spence's Scots National Movement and the Scottish Home Rule Movement. On 23 June an inauguration took place in Stirling.

The NPS was a left-of-centre party. The poet Hugh MacDiarmid was a member, but was expelled on account of his communist views (ironically, he would later be expelled from the Communist Party of Great Britain for his Scottish Nationalist beliefs). Other figures besides MacDiarmid were involved. Eric Linklater stood as an NPS candidate in the 1933 East Fife by-election, and Neil Gunn played a role in aiding the NPS amalgamation with the Scottish Party.

== Merger ==
In 1932 a home rule organisation, the Scottish Party, was formed by former members of the then Unionist Party, precursor of the modern Scottish Conservative and Unionist Party. MacCormick desired unity amongst the Scottish Nationalist movement and made contact with the Scottish Party. Increasingly the two parties began to co-operate, and when the Scottish Party chose to contest the Kilmarnock by-election in November 1933 the NPS endorsed their candidate. In 1934 the NPS and Scottish Party merged to form the Scottish National Party.

== Leaders of the National Party of Scotland ==
- Roland Muirhead, (1928–1932?)

== Electoral performance ==
Lewis Spence was the first nationalist to stand for election. He contested Midlothian and Peebles Northern at a by-election in 1929 and came fourth, with 4.5% of the vote.

Westminster Elections	Candidates standing	Seats won	Votes	% Scottish vote	Saved deposits
1929 General Election	2	0	3,313	0.5	0
1931 General Election	5	0	20,954	1.0	3

The NPS contested many elections in its short existence but never managed to get any of its candidates elected to parliament.

=== By-elections, 1929 ===
By-election	Candidate	Votes	%	Position
1929 Midlothian and Peebles Northern by-election	Lewis Spence	842	4.5	4

=== 1929 general election ===
Constituency	Candidate	Votes	%	Position
Glasgow Camlachie	John MacCormick	1,646	4.9	3
West Renfrewshire	Roland Muirhead	1,667	5.4	4

=== By-elections, 1929-1931 ===
By-election	Candidate	Votes	%	Position
1930 Glasgow Shettleston by-election	John McNicol	2,527	10.1	3
1930 East Renfrewshire by-election	Oliver Brown	4,818	13.1	3
1931 Glasgow St Rollox by-election	Elma Campbell	3,521	15.8	3

=== 1931 general election ===
Constituency	Candidate	Votes	%	Position
East Renfrewshire	Oliver Brown	6,498	13.9	3
Edinburgh East	T. T. Alexander	2,872	9.4	3
Glasgow St Rollox	Elma Campbell	3,521	13.3	3
Inverness	John MacCormick	4,016	14.0	3
West Renfrewshire	Roland Muirhead	3,547	11.0	3

=== By-elections, 1931-1933 ===
By-election	Candidate	Votes	%	Position
1932 Dunbartonshire by-election	Robert Gray	5,178	13.4	3
1932 Montrose Burghs by-election	Douglas Emslie	1,966	11.7	3
1933 East Fife by-election	Eric Linklater	1,083	3.6	5
