= Scottish nationalism =

Political ideology

Flag of Scotland

Scottish nationalism promotes the idea that the Scottish people form a cohesive nation and national identity.

Modern Scottish nationalism began to shape from 1853 with the National Association for the Vindication of Scottish Rights, progressing into the Scottish National Movement in the 1920s maturing by the 1970s and achieved its present ideological maturity in the 1980s and 1990s.

The nation's origin, political context and unique characteristics including the Gaelic language, poetry and film maintains an individual's distinct identification and support of Scotland.

== Origins ==
Scottish nationalism, the concept of Scotland as an individual nation state became prominent within Scotland in the Middle Ages. During the Anglo-Scottish Wars, the campaign led by Scotland was to obtain Scottish independence as a separate sovereign state. The campaign was successful, and following the Declaration of Arbroath, a formal letter sent to Pope John XXII, Scotland, and the nation's individual identity were officially recognised as sovereign in 1328.

Scotland proceeded to operate as an independent nation state until the Acts of Union which merged both the Parliaments and Kingdoms of Scotland and England in 1707 to be "united into one Kingdom of Great Britain", a united state retaining separate legal system, however a distinct Scottish institution continues to exist.

== Scottish nationality ==
Scottish national identity, those identifying as Scottish only nationals has been effectively measured over recent years, evaluated officially where Scottish citizens were asked within the UK Census to identify as Scottish only, British and Scottish or just British.

In the last two census completions, the majority of Scottish citizens had identified with predominantly a Scottish only identity on the nationality questionnaire.

In the 2011 Census in Scotland:

- 62.4% identified themselves as Scottish only
- 82% of respondents who took part had selected they had some Scottish national identity.

In the 2021 Census in Scotland:

- 65.5% identified themselves as Scottish only
- 89.8% of respondents who took part had selected they had some Scottish national identity.

The UK Office for National Statistics 2021 statement on national identity clarifies that national identity is a self-determined assessment of their own identity; it could be the country or countries where they feel they belong or think of as home. It is not dependent on ethnic group or citizenship. Respondents could select more than one national identity.

From measurable statistics, the 2021 UK census held had concluded that the majority of Scottish nationals, those in Scotland identify Scotland as their only Nation or country, supporting the idea that the Scottish people form a cohesive nation and national identity.

== Language ==
Scottish Gaelic, also known as the founding or Native language of Scotland is currently the oldest Scottish language still in use today.

The History of Scottish Gaelic itself has been through a tremendous legacy of turmoil, from Scots nobles learning only English as a first language as far back as the 13th century, the implementation of the Statutes of Iona in 1609 forcing Scots nobles to learn English, or the 1616 Education Act implemented by the Scottish Privy Council which declared that no heir of a Gaelic chief could inherit unless he could write, read and speak English

Around ten such Acts were raised between 1494 and 1698, passed by the Scots Parliament to make English the first language, Gaelic had struggled to retain a foothold over Scotland. As Scotland and England were united under the Acts of Union 1707, Gaelic lost its legitimacy as a legal and administrative language. Gaelic did however continued to gain importance as the language of the Highland clans, and the language of the Jacobites.

Prior to the Education (Scotland) Act 1872, the Act of Proscription 1746 was implemented to assimilate Highland Scots into Lowland & British culture. Following the Government victory over the Jacobites, Jacobitism as a significant political force diminished, Highland dress was outlawed, banned, and Highland culture & Language deterred, those speaking Gaelic, or wearing highland dress historically received various forms of punishment. On 1 July 1782, royal assent was given to Repeal of the Act Proscribing the Wearing of Highland Dress 22 George III, Chap. 63, 1782 and a proclamation issued in Gaelic and English. Under the Education (Scotland) Act, school attendance was compulsory and only English was taught, or tolerated in the schools of both the Lowlands and the Highlands and Islands. As a result, any student who spoke Scottish Gaelic in the school or on its grounds could expect what Ronald Black calls the, "familiar Scottish experience of being thrashed" for speaking their native language of Gaelic.

Since devolution and the passing of the Gaelic Language (Scotland) Act 2005, Scottish nationalists have spearheaded an effort to bring Scottish Gaelic back from the brink of extinction through the spread of immersion schools funded by the Scottish Parliament.

The lowland Scots Language, previously known as Inglis/Early Scots is a member of the West Germanic languages which also has a reported history of being deterred within Scottish Education. Scots speakers today agree that they have received various forms of punishment for speaking Scots. For this reason, the protection and revival of both Scottish Gaelic and Lowland Scots play a key role in nationalist ideology.

Linguistic independence is primarily associated with the poetry of Robert Burns about the events of the Wars of Scottish Independence, before it experienced a resurgence during the Scottish Renaissance, as led by Hugh MacDiarmid.

== Politics ==
Within politics, Scottish nationalism was held as a key ideology by the National Party of Scotland which later became the Scottish National Party (SNP). Their rise in popularity since being elected to government at Holyrood in 2007 led to talks in place with Westminster in 2012 to legally mandate the 2014 Scottish independence referendum. The referendum was held on Thursday 18 September 2014, and was a victory for the Better Together campaign; who advocated keeping Scotland part of the United Kingdom, with 55% of the Scottish electorate across all 32 council areas voting "No" to independence. However, four of the thirty-two local authority council areas in Scotland did have a majority "Yes" vote in support of independence: Dundee, Glasgow, North Lanarkshire and West Dunbartonshire, which accounted for the wishes of 1,617,989 people who voted in favour of independence across Scotland as a whole.

Despite the nationalist side losing the referendum, the SNP experienced a surge in support in the following months, and won a landslide majority in Scotland at the UK general election the following year; ending 51 years of dominance by Scottish Labour. Many long-serving Labour politicians lost their seats in the biggest political upset in decades, with the SNP winning all but three Scottish House of Commons seats and displacing the Liberal Democrats to become the third party of the United Kingdom; despite only standing for election in Scotland. On Thursday, 23 June 2016, the United Kingdom held a referendum on continuing membership of the European Union, which resulted in 52% of the British electorate voting for the United Kingdom to leave the European Union. A second Scottish independence referendum has been proposed, as 62% of the Scottish electorate voted for the UK to remain in the European Union, and guaranteed prosperity through single market access was part of the Better Together campaign's argument to convince the Scottish people to vote to stay part of the UK.

In 2021, former SNP Leader and First Minister of Scotland Alex Salmond launched the Alba Party and announced it would run in the 2021 Scottish Parliament election, to try to achieve "supermajority" for Scottish independence. However, the party failed to win any seats in Parliament and has never won any election it has contested to the present day.

On 15 June 2022, First Minister Nicola Sturgeon declared that she planned to hold a second Scottish independence referendum in October 2023. Her decision was unanimously struck down as null and void by the Supreme Court of the United Kingdom on 23 November 2022.

== Ultranationalism and paramilitary groups ==
The Scottish National Liberation Army, a paramilitary group also known as the Tartan Terrorists was formed by Adam Busby after the 1979 Scottish devolution referendum. The SNLA claimed responsibility for many letter bomb deliveries to public figures such as Margaret Thatcher and Diana, Princess of Wales, along with a string of arson attacks during the 1980s, including a firebomb attack at the Conservative party headquarters located in Glasgow, in addition to larger scale attacks at targets such as the British Ministry of Defence Headquarters and a British Airways office in London. Activity from the group continued sporadically until 2012, when the group announced a ceasefire in order to make space for democratic debates in the lead-up to the 2014 independence referendum.

Siol nan Gaidheal, an ultranationalist nationalist group was founded by Tom Moore in 1978 which bases membership of the nation on blood descent or heredity, often articulated in terms of common blood or kinship such as the traditional Scottish clan system rather than on political, or civil membership.

Arm nan Gaidheal was a short lived paramilitary formed by former members of SnG, which was responsible for various petrol bomb attacks in the early 1980s after a failed referendum on Scottish devolution. Currently, Siol nan Gaidheal is remains a banned group in Scotland under the Scottish National Party.

Frederick Boothby led and created the Army of the Provisional Government, who were responsible for a series of bombings in 1975 and a failed attempted bank robbery where Boothby was apprehended.

== Popular culture ==
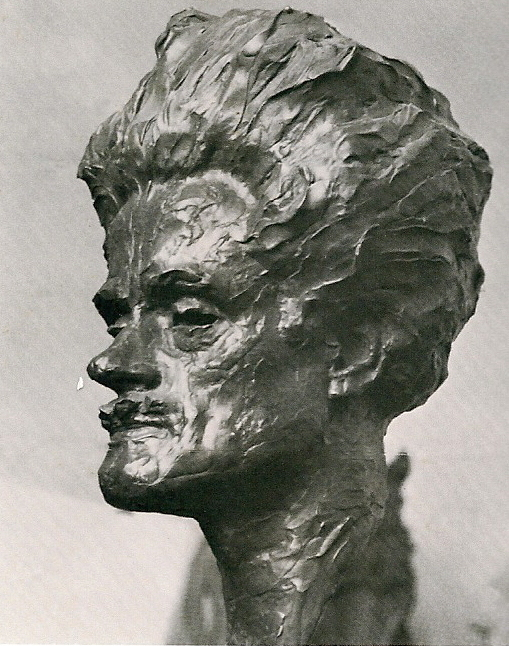
Hugh MacDiarmid was an influential figure and staunch believer in Scottish nationalism.

=== Poetry ===
- In 1375, Scottish makar, or court poet, John Barbour completed the epic poem The Brus, which retells and celebrates the deeds of Robert the Bruce, who led the Scottish people in their Wars of Independence against Kings Edward I and Edward II of England and who ultimately became King of Scotland.
- Around 1488, Scottish makar Blind Harry wrote the epic poem The Wallace, about the life and death of Scottish nationalist leader William Wallace.
- Alasdair mac Mhaighstir Alasdair (c. 1698-1770), a Jacobite war poet and major figure in Scottish Gaelic literature, has also been having a growing influence upon both Scottish nationalism and republicanism. Despite his own personal monarchism and passionate loyalty to the House of Stuart, Alasdair's many poetic denunciations and satires against the House of Hanover, the ancestors of the modern British royal family, have been admired, praised, and translated by poets and writers who favour Scottish independence.
- The events of the Scottish Wars of Independence are also a regular theme in the verse of Scotland's national poet, Robert Burns.
- Hugh MacDiarmid (1892 - 1978) was a Scottish poet, considered one of the principal forces behind the Scottish Renaissance, he had a great influence on Scottish culture and politics.

=== Film ===
- Braveheart is a historical war film that dramatizes the life of William Wallace during the First War of Scottish Independence. Mel Gibson portrayed Wallace onscreen, as well as directing the film. Screenwriter Randall Wallace had largely based the screenplay upon the poem The Wallace by Blind Harry. Although the film caused a rise in Scottish nationalism, with Lin Anderson, author of Braveheart: From Hollywood To Holyrood, claiming the film helped Scotland get its first devolved parliament since 1707, the film has been criticized for its historical inaccuracy, but its alleged inaccuracies have entered into popular culture itself.
- What was intended to be a more accurate film about the Wars of Scottish Independence was written and directed by David Mackenzie and titled Outlaw King. Outlaw King has faced its own critics for inaccuracy. A notable example is how Robert the Bruce (Chris Pine) is portrayed as an enigmatic and well-behaved man of the people who desires to restore Scotland to the Scottish people. However, historian Fiona Watson notes the real King Robert I was most likely cold, canny, machiavellian, and driven by his personal ambition. Edward, Prince of Wales (Billy Howle), Bruce's main enemy, was also depicted as a cruel and sadistic person who is eager to succeed his father, King Edward Longshanks (Stephen Dillane). In reality, Prince Edward was reluctant to assume the kingship and was known to be generous with his servants.

== See also ==
- Devolution in the United Kingdom
- Unionism in Scotland
- Irish nationalism
- Scottish independence
- Scottish republicanism
