= List of listed buildings in Scone, Perth and Kinross =

This is a list of listed buildings in the parish of Scone in Perth and Kinross, Scotland.

== List ==
Name	Location	Date listed	Grid ref. (Note: Sometimes known as OSGB36, the grid reference (where provided) is based on the British national grid reference system used by the Ordnance Survey. • "Guide to National Grid". Ordnance Survey. • "Get-a-map". Ordnance Survey.)	Geo-coordinates	Notes	LB number (Note: Historic Environment Scotland assign a unique alphanumeric identifier to each designated site in Scotland, for listed buildings this always begins with "LB", for example "LB12345".)	Image
Scone Palace, Old Scone mercat cross				56°25′26″N 3°26′06″W	Category A	19876	Upload another image See more images
Cross Of New Scone Junction Of Cross Street And Abbey Road, New Scone				56°24′56″N 3°24′21″W	Category B	18362	Upload Photo
11 Mansfield Road, New Scone				56°25′12″N 3°24′03″W	Category C(S)	18367	Upload Photo
Scone Palace Including Terraces				56°25′21″N 3°26′17″W	Category A	18370	Upload another image
Scone Palace Mortuary Chapel Or Mausoleum. Boot (Or Moot) Hill				56°25′25″N 3°26′16″W	Category A	18371	Upload another image
Scone Palace, Queen's Bridge Over Catmoor Burn				56°25′14″N 3°25′56″W	Category B	18375	Upload Photo
Bonhard House				56°24′57″N 3°22′55″W	Category B	18381	Upload Photo
Colen, Steading				56°27′26″N 3°26′51″W	Category B	18384	Upload Photo
Waulkmill Ferry Bothy				56°26′42″N 3°27′01″W	Category B	18974	Upload Photo
Hill House				56°27′26″N 3°27′09″W	Category C(S)	18356	Upload Photo
Mediaeval Coffin And Other Fragments				56°25′22″N 3°26′13″W	Category B	18373	Upload Photo
Scone Palace Stables				56°25′27″N 3°26′13″W	Category B	18376	Upload Photo
Balboughty Steading				56°25′56″N 3°25′17″W	Category B	18377	Upload Photo
Blairhall, Farmhouse				56°26′22″N 3°26′07″W	Category B	18379	Upload Photo
Scone New Church Perth Road, New Scone				56°25′13″N 3°23′53″W	Category B	18363	Upload Photo
19 Lynedoch Road, New Scone				56°25′24″N 3°24′01″W	Category B	18369	Upload Photo
Balboughty House				56°25′56″N 3°25′08″W	Category C(S)	18378	Upload Photo
Newmiln Cottages				56°27′25″N 3°24′38″W	Category C(S)	48739	Upload Photo
Parish Church, New Scone				56°24′52″N 3°24′30″W	Category B	18361	Upload Photo
New Scone, Abbey Road, Robert Douglas Memorial Institute (Former School) And 22 Mansfield Road				56°25′14″N 3°24′07″W	Category B	18365	Upload Photo
Scone Palace, Gateway And Boundary Wall Of Old Place				56°25′25″N 3°26′08″W	Category B	18372	Upload Photo
Newmiln, Gateway				56°27′26″N 3°24′53″W	Category C(S)	18357	Upload Photo
Fairfield				56°27′23″N 3°24′32″W	Category B	19875	Upload Photo
Scone New Church Hall, Abbey Road, New Scone				56°25′11″N 3°24′10″W	Category C(S)	18364	Upload Photo
St. David's Chapel Stormontfield				56°27′07″N 3°26′53″W	Category B	18382	Upload another image
Colen, Farmhouse				56°27′24″N 3°26′51″W	Category B	18383	Upload Photo
12 Mansfield Road, New Scone				56°25′13″N 3°24′00″W	Category C(S)	18366	Upload Photo
20 Murrayshall Road, New Scone				56°25′06″N 3°23′50″W	Category B	18368	Upload Photo
Scone Palace, Bridge On Queen's Drive Over Catmoor Burn				56°25′13″N 3°26′01″W	Category B	18374	Upload Photo
Bonhard Doocot				56°25′03″N 3°22′55″W	Category B	18380	Upload Photo

== Key ==
The scheme for classifying buildings in Scotland is:

- Category A: "buildings of national or international importance, either architectural or historic; or fine, little-altered examples of some particular period, style or building type."
- Category B: "buildings of regional or more than local importance; or major examples of some particular period, style or building type, which may have been altered."
- Category C: "buildings of local importance; lesser examples of any period, style, or building type, as originally constructed or moderately altered; and simple traditional buildings which group well with other listed buildings."

In March 2016 there were 47,288 listed buildings in Scotland. Of these, 8% were Category A, and 50% were Category B, with the remaining 42% being Category C.
