= Ulva in literature and the arts =

Ulva in literature and the arts refers to the literary and artistic connections to the island of Ulva in the Hebrides of Scotland.

During the 18th and 19th centuries in particular many famous literary figures visited the island including Dr Johnson, Walter Scott and James Hogg and there are numerous written works about the island as a result. The island also had a piping school at one time and Beatrix Potter was a visitor during the 20th century.

== Boswell and Johnson ==
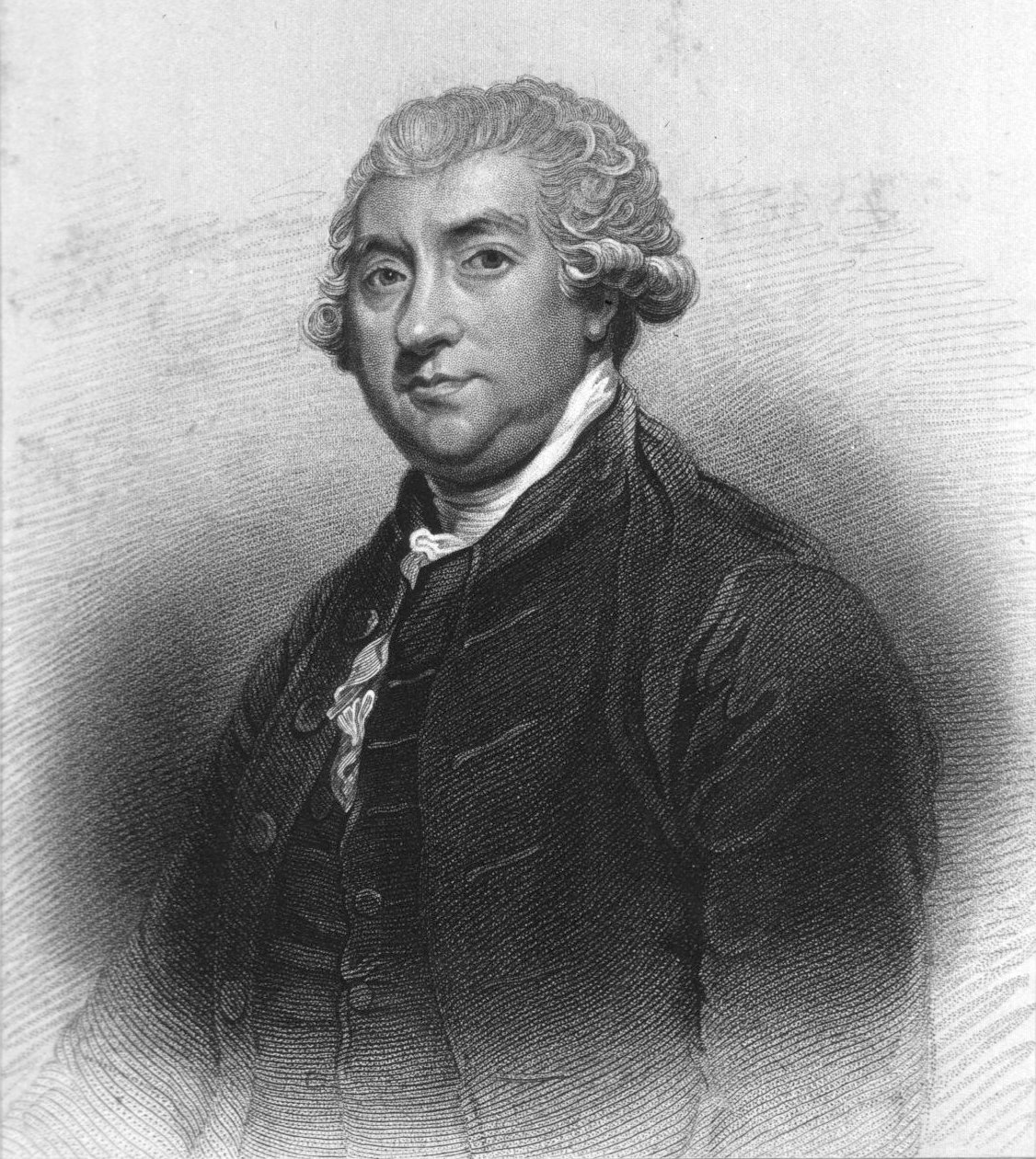
James Boswell

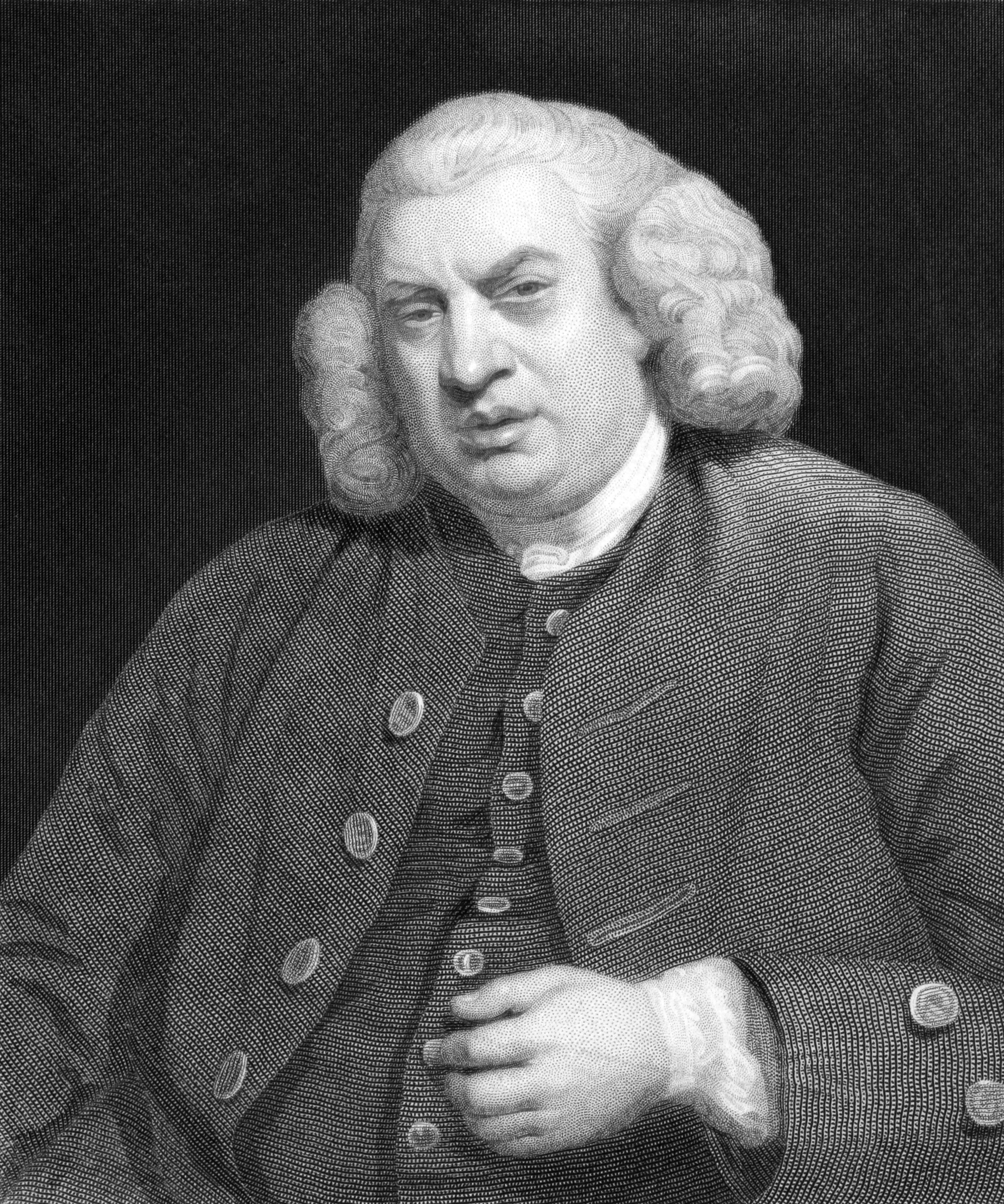
Samuel Johnson painted circa 1772, a year before his visit to Ulva

Dr Johnson and Boswell visited The MacQuarrie on Ulva in October 1773, the year after Sir Joseph Banks brought Staffa to the English-speaking world's attention. Perhaps aware that Banks considered that the columnar basalt cliff formations on Ulva called "The Castles" rivalled Staffa's Johnson wrote:

When the islanders were reproached with their ignorance or insensibility of the wonders of Staffa, they had not much to reply. They had indeed considered it little, because they had always seen it; and none but philosophers, nor they always, are struck with wonder otherwise than by novelty.

Both men left separate accounts of the visit, Johnson in A Journey to the Western Islands of Scotland (18 January 1775) and Boswell in Journal of a Tour to the Hebrides with Samuel Johnson, LL.D (1785). They arrived on Saturday, 16 October, and left the following day. Johnson wrote:

We resolved not to embarrass a family, in a time of so much sorrow, if any other expedient could he found; and as the Island of Ulva was over-against us, it was determined that we should pass the strait and have recourse to the Laird, who, like the other gentlemen of the Islands, was known to Col. We expected to find a ferry-boat, but when at last we came to the water, the boat was gone.

We were now again at a stop. It was the sixteenth of October, a time when it is not convenient to sleep in the Hebrides without a cover, and there was no house within our reach, but that which we had already declined.

Boswell said:

We were in hopes to get to Sir Allan Maclean's at Inchkenneth, to-night; but the eight miles [13 km], of which our road was said to consist, were so very long, that we did not reach the opposite coast of Mull till seven at night, though we had set out about eleven in the forenoon; and when we did arrive there, we found the wind strong against us. Col determined that we should pass the night at M'Quarrie's, in the island of Ulva, which lies between Mull and Inchkenneth; and a servant was sent forward to the ferry, to secure the boat for us: but the boat was gone to the Ulva side, and the wind was so high that the people could not hear him call; and the night so dark that they could not see a signal. We should have been in a very bad situation, had there not fortunately been lying in the little sound of Ulva an Irish vessel, the Bonnetta, of Londonderry, Captain M'Lure, master. He himself was at M'Quarrie's; but his men obligingly came with their long-boat, and ferried us over.(Boswell)

Boswell was not impressed with Macquarrie's house, but appears to have enjoyed the company:

M'Quarrie's house was mean; but we were agreeably surprised with the appearance of the master, whom we found to be intelligent, polite, and much a man of the world. Though his clan is not numerous, he is a very ancient chief, and has a burial place at Icolmkill [Iona]. He told us, his family had possessed Ulva for nine hundred years; but I was distressed to hear that it was soon to be sold for the payment of his debts.

Captain M'Lure, whom we found here, was of Scotch extraction, and properly a M'Leod, being descended of some of the M'Leods who went with Sir Normand [sic] of Bernera to the battle of Worcester, and after the defeat of the royalists, fled to Ireland, and, to conceal themselves, took a different name. He told me, there was a great number of them about Londonderry; some of good property. I said, they should now resume their real name. The Laird of M'Leod should go over, and assemble them, and make them all drink the large horn full, and from that time they should be M'Leods. The captain informed us, he had named his ship the Bonnetta, out of gratitude to Providence; for once, when he was sailing to America with a good number of passengers, the ship in which he then sailed was becalmed for five weeks, and during all that time, numbers of the fish bonnetta swam close to her, and were caught for food; he resolved therefore, that the ship he should

next get, should be called the Bonnetta.(Boswell)

Johnson too admired the antiquity of the family, but did not care for the landscape too much:

To Ulva we came in the dark, and left it before noon the next day. A very exact description therefore will not be expected. We were told, that it is an Island of no great extent, rough and barren, inhabited by the Macquarrys; a clan not powerful nor numerous, but of antiquity, which most other families are content to reverence [...] Of the ancestors of Macquarry, who thus lies hid in his unfrequented Island, I have found memorials in all places where they could be expected.

Great though the age of the Macquarries may have been, it appears at this point that they were considering selling it, and that the house was in a state of disrepair, despite the hospitality:

Talking of the sale of an estate of an ancient family, which was said to have been purchased much under its value by the confidential lawyer of that family, and it being mentioned that the sale would probably be set aside by a suit in equity, Dr Johnson said, 'I am very willing that this sale should be set aside, but I doubt much whether the suit will be successful; for the argument for avoiding the sale is founded on vague and indeterminate principles, as that the price was too low, and that there was a great degree of confidence placed by the seller in the person who became the purchaser. Now, how low should a price be? or what degree of confidence should there be to make a bargain be set aside? a bargain, which is a wager of skill between man and man. If, indeed, any fraud can be proved, that will do.'

When Dr Johnson and I were by ourselves at night, I observed of our host, aspectum generosum habet. Et generosum animum, he added. For fear of being overheard in the small Highland houses, I often talked to him in such Latin as I could speak, and with as much of the English accent as I could assume, so as not to be understood, in case our conversation should be too loud for the space.

We had each an elegant bed in the same room; and here it was that a circumstance occurred, as to which he has been strangely misunderstood. From his description of his chamber, it has erroneously been supposed, that his bed being too short for him, his feet, during the night, were in the mire; whereas he has only said, that when he undressed, he felt his feet in the mire: that is, the clay-floor of the room, on which he stood before he went into bed, was wet, in consequence of the windows being broken, which let in the rain.(Boswell)

Johnson heard later on that the island had been sold to Capt. Dugald Campbell of Achnaba, and wrote to him:

Every eye must look with pain on a Campbell turning the MacQuarries at will out of their sedes avitae, their hereditary island.

== Scott, Hogg and other visitors ==
James Hogg, "The Ettrick Shepherd"

London poet John Keats was one of many famous visitors to Ulva in the 19th century.

Boswell and Johnson were not the only famous non-Highland visitors to the island. Walter Scott and James Hogg also visited the islands some decades later. In 1810 Scott discussed the prospect of a visit, which he describes as a "jaunt":

Among all my hopes & fears the uppermost thought is that you will be down this year. I have a prospect of a nice jaunt to the Hebrides with a light sloop & eight men belonging to Staffa, MacDonald, who would be delighted to receive you at Ulva — The ladies could remain at Oban if they were afraid of the Sea. But you must wipe your minds eye pull up the breeches of your resolution and set forth as soon as possible for we must get to the Hebrides early in July unless we mean to encounter long nights & tempestuous weather

Scott was struck by the contrast between Ulva and the nearby island of Inchkenneth:

"... a most beautiful islet of the most verdant green, while all the neighbouring shore of Greban, as well as the large islands of Colinsay and Ulva, are as black as heath can make them. But Ulva has a good anchorage, and Inchkenneth is surrounded by shoals."

By the time Scott visited the "mean" house of Boswell's journal was gone, and replaced by one from a design by Robert Adam. This in turn has been destroyed, and the current Ulva House is on its site.

Hogg wrote some graffiti on the wall of Ulva Inn, now lost due to its burning down in 1880:

I've roamed around the creeks and headlands of Mull,
Their fields are uncultured and cussedly weedy,
Their hard lands are bare and their havens dull,
Their folks may be brave, but they're cussedly greedy.

Naturally, the locals were slightly upset by this, and the Minister of Ulva, Rev. MacLeod wrote the following reply, with a sly pun referring to Jesus' Discourse on holiness from the Sermon on the Mount:

Ho! Shepherd of Ettrick,
Why sorely complain,
Though the boatman be greedy for grog?
The beauties of Staffa,
by this we proclaim,
Are like pearls cast away on a Hogg

After his visit, Walter Scott used Ulva as material for various works, for example, in his 1815 poem, Lord of the Isles (Canto 4)

And Ulva dark, and Colonsay,

And all the group of islets gay

That guard famed Staffa round.

The Colonsay referred to here, is probably nearby Little Colonsay rather than Colonsay itself. In Tales of a Grandfather, Scott tells the story of "Alan-a-Sop" (an anglicisation of the Gaelic for "Alan of the straw", so called because he was born "on a heap of straw") who was born the illegitimate son of the Maclean of Duart in the 16th century. In his youth, Alan-a-Sop was treated badly by his stepfather, one Maclean of Torloisk. He grew up to be a pirate and eventually took a bloody revenge on Torloisk with the help of MacQuarrie of Ulva.

Many other visitors to neighbouring Staffa stayed at Ulva Inn, this included Keats, Mendelssohn, and William Wordsworth.

== David Livingstone ==
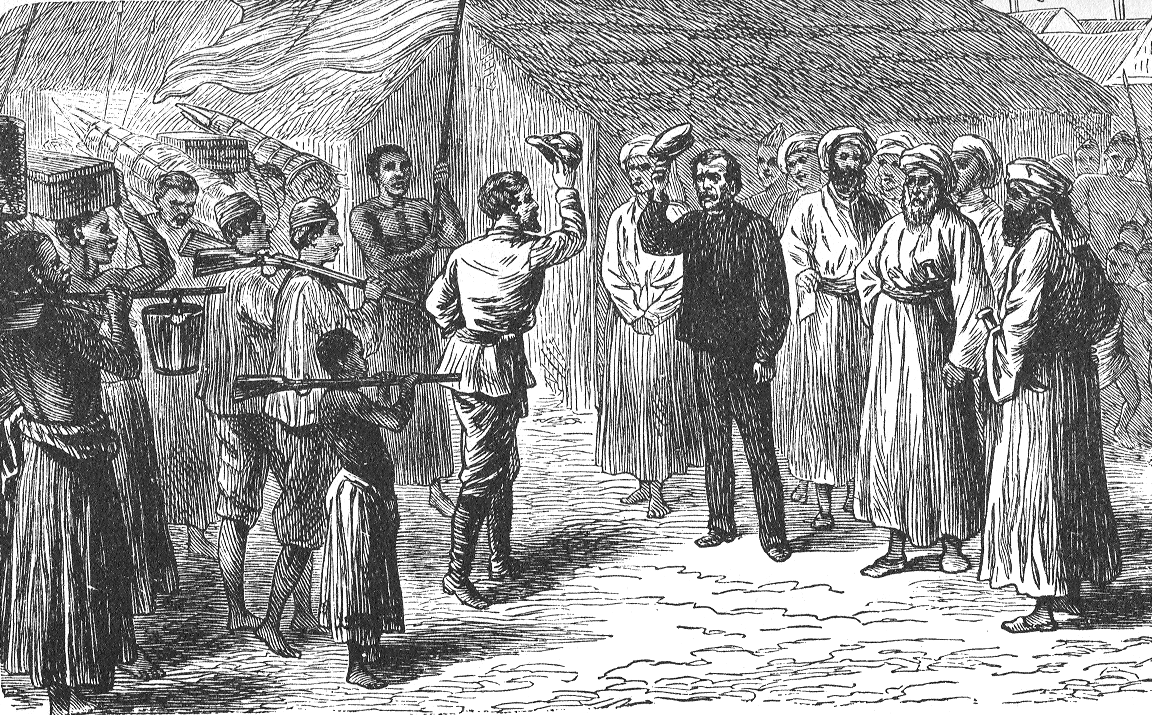
The famous meeting of Stanley and Livingstone in Africa

The famous Scottish missionary and explorer of Africa, David Livingstone recounted how his ancestors had originally come from Ulva.

"Our great-grandfather fell at the battle of Culloden, fighting for the old line of kings; and our grandfather was a small farmer in Ulva, where my father was born."

Livingstone recounted how Ulva had a great store of folklore, and legends, which his grandfather told them:

"Our grandfather was intimately acquainted with all the traditionary legends which that great writer [Walter Scott] has since made use of in the Tales of a Grandfather and other works. As a boy I remember listening to him with delight, for his memory was stored with a never-ending stock of stories, many of which were wonderfully like those I have since heard while sitting by the African evening fires. Our grandmother, too, used to sing Gaelic songs, some of which, as she believed, had been composed by captive islanders languishing hopelessly among the Turks [i.e. Moroccan pirates].

"Grandfather could give particulars of the lives of his ancestors for six generations of the family before him; and the only point of the tradition I feel proud of is this: One of these poor hardy islanders was renowned in the district for great wisdom and prudence; and it is related that, when he was on his death-bed, he called all his children around him and said,

Now, in my lifetime, I have searched most carefully through all the traditions I could find of our family, and I never could discover that there was a dishonest man among our forefathers. If, therefore, any of you or any of your children should take to dishonest ways, it will not be because it runs in our blood: it does not belong to you. I leave this precept with you: Be honest."

Livingstone also recorded the religion of the yellow stick, which is more connected with the Small Isles.

If, therefore, in the following pages I fall into any errors, I hope they will be dealt with as honest mistakes, and not as indicating that I have forgotten our ancient motto. This event took place at a time when the Highlanders, according to Macaulay, were much like the Cape Caffres [kaffirs], and any one, it was said, could escape punishment for cattle-stealing by presenting a share of the plunder to his chieftain. Our ancestors were Roman Catholics; they were made Protestants by the laird coming round with a man having a yellow staff, which would seem to have attracted more attention than his teaching, for the new religion went long afterward, perhaps it does so still, by the name of “the religion of the yellow stick”.

Like many Gaels in the 19th century, Livingstone's grandfather was forced to emigrate to the Lowlands for work:

"Finding his farm in Ulva insufficient to support a numerous family, my grandfather removed to Blantyre Works, a large cotton manufactory on the beautiful Clyde, above Glasgow; and his sons, having had the best education the Hebrides afforded, were gladly received as clerks by the proprietors, Monteith and Co. He himself, highly esteemed for his unflinching honesty, was employed in the conveyance of large sums of money from Glasgow to the works, and in old age was, according to the custom of that company, pensioned off, so as to spend his declining years in ease and comfort."

Andrew Ross says David Livingstone was the second son of Neil Livingston (known as "Niall Beag", wee Neil, or "Niall MacDhun-lèibhe"), who was born on Ulva in 1788, who was in turn the son of another Neil. He also claims that the family stories do not quite fit, and that it is unlikely that he was a descendant of a Culloden combatant. A Mull legend also says that Neil (grandfather) may have been driven from his house by redcoats in the middle of a snowstorm. However, there is no evidence for this. He also notes that Neil's church on Ulva had given the following letter of recommendation of their parishioner, something no doubt David was proud of.

"The bearer, Neil Livingstone, a married man in Ulva, part of the parish of Kilninian, has always maintained an unblemished moral character, and is known for a man of piety and religion. He has a family of four sons, the youngest of which is three years, and three daughters, of which the youngest is six years of age. As he proposes to offer his services at some of the cotton-spinning manufactories, he and his wife Mary Morrison, and their family of children is hereby recommended for suitable encouragement.

"Given at Ulva, this eighth day of January, 1792, by

"Arch. McArthur, Minister
"Lach. Mclean, Elder
"R.S. Stewart JP, Elder"

== MacArthur's piping school ==
A piper named MacArthur set up a famous piping school on Ulva in the 18th century. He himself was trained by the great MacCrimmon dynasty of Skye, whose piping skills were legendary in Gaeldom. The MacArthurs themselves were said to be amongst the greatest bagpipers to come out of Scotland. Allen writes:

The MacCrimmons and the MacArthurs were said to have been the finest pipers and exponents of the piobaireachd and history relates great rivalry between the families for supremacy. Both the MacCrimmons and the MacArthurs had colleges for piping students; the former on the farm of Boreraig, eight miles [13 km] south west of Dunvegan Castle on Skye, the latter at Ulva near Mull. For the MacCrimmon pupils seven years study was necessary in their apprenticeship. The pupils had a solitary designated area of open space in which to practice the scales and tunes on the chanter, the Small Pipes and Piob Mhòr before being allowed to perform for their Master Tutor. The college at Ulva had four rooms; one for cattle, one for guests to stay, one for practice and one specifically for the use of students. In both cases the countryside was preferred for practice as was, and still is, deemed correct for the Piob Mhòr.

== Lord Ullin's Daughter ==
The most famous commemoration of Ulva in literature is Thomas Campbell's poem, Lord Ullin's Daughter, written after the writer had visited the region. The opening two stanzas are as follows:

A CHIEFTAIN to the Highlands bound

Cries, "Boatman, do not tarry!

And I'll give thee a silver pound

To row us o'er the ferry!"

"Now who be ye would cross Lochgyle,

This dark and stormy water?"

"O I'm the chief of Ulva's isle,

And this, Lord Ullin's daughter.

The poem was translated into the Russian language by the Romantic poet Vasiliy Zhukovsky. In Zhukovsky's translation, Lord Ullin's daughter, who is left unnamed in Campbell's original, is given the name Malvina, which the Russian poet borrowed from James Macpherson's Ossian. Vladimir Nabokov has translated Zhukovsky's translation into English to demonstrate the changes that were made.

== Moladh Ulbha ==
Moladh Ulbha (In Praise of Ulva) is a song written by the Ulbhach Bard, Colin Fletcher (Cailean Mac an Fhleisdeir). It was transcribed by the Rev. MacKenzie. This is the first verse.

Mi 'nam shuidhe 'n seo leam fhèin
Smaoinich mi gun innsinn sgeul
Na làithean sona bh' agam fhèin
Nuair bha mi òg an Ulbha

(Trans.: Me sitting here by myself
I thought I'd tell a story,
The happy days I had myself
When I was young in Ulva)

== Other authors ==
The Rev. Donald MacKenzie (Dòmhnall MacCoinnich), author of As it Was: Sin Mar a Bha: An Ulva Boyhood was a noted Gaelic-language author. He was born in Lewis, and his ancestors were from Harris, but he spent a number of years in Ulva itself, from June 1918 onwards. He was formerly minister in Rothesay. Amongst his achievements was a large number of translations of the poems of Robert Burns. He was the last minister on the island.

John MacCormick (Scottish Gaelic: Iain MacCormaig; 1870–1947), the author of the first full length Scottish Gaelic novel, Dùn Aluinn (1912) was an occasional visitor to the island. He wrote a number of short stories, non-fiction and a novella. He came from Mull, and was a distant relative of the politician of the same name and Neil MacCormick

English children's writer, Beatrix Potter (1866–1943) also visited Ulva from time to time. She was a relative of the Clark family, and The Tale of Mr. Tod (1912) is dedicated to F.W. Clark (III - grandson of the man who bought the island). The dedication says rather cryptically: "FOR FRANCIS WILLIAM OF ULVA — SOMEDAY!" Curiously, although the main characters of the book are a fox (tod) and a badger (brock), neither species can be found on Ulva.
