= Heggie =

Heggie is a surname. Notable people with the surname include:

- Bill Heggie (1927–1977), Scottish footballer
- Charles Heggie (1862–?), Scottish footballer
- George Heggie (1879–1953), Irish-born Canadian politician
- Jake Heggie (born 1961), American classical composer and pianist
- O.P. Heggie (1877–1936), Australian actor
- Robert Andrew Heggie (1915–2000), Canadian lawyer, judge and politician
- Will Heggie, Scottish musician
- Douglas C. Heggie, Scottish applied mathematician and astronomer
