= Stormont =

Stormont may refer to:

== Peerages ==
- Viscount of Stormont, a noble title in the Peerage of Scotland

== People ==
- Lord Stormont (1727–1796), British ambassador to France in the 18th century
- Lady Stormont (1737–1766), German-British salonnière and wife of Lord Stormont
- Robert Stormont (1872–1943), Scottish footballer, played for Preston North End, Dundee, Tottenham Hotspur and Brentford.
- Bill Stormont (1898–1925), New Zealand rugby player
- Mary Stormont (1871–1962), British painter

== Structures ==
- On the Stormont Estate in Belfast:
  - Parliament Buildings (Northern Ireland), commonly known as Stormont, the seat of the Northern Ireland Assembly
  - Stormont Castle, the seat of the Northern Ireland Executive
  - Stormont House, the seat of the Northern Ireland Office
  - Stormont (cricket ground), a first-class cricket ground
- Stormont Vail Health, a hospital center in Topeka, Kansas

== Politics ==
- Stormont, a metonym for:
  - Government of Northern Ireland (past and present)
  - Northern Ireland Assembly (current)
  - Northern Ireland Executive (current)
  - Parliament of Northern Ireland (former)

== Places ==
=== Canada ===
- Stormont, Nova Scotia, a community in Guysborough County
  - Stormont II, a cable ferry operating in Nova Scotia, based in the community
- Stormont, Dundas and Glengarry United Counties, a county in Ontario, Canada
  - Stormont County, Ontario, one of the former counties that merged to form Stormont, Dundas and Glengarry United Counties county
  - North Stormont, a township in the county
  - South Stormont, a township in the county
  - Stormont, Dundas and Glengarry Highlanders, a Primary Reserve infantry regiment of the Canadian Forces

=== Scotland ===
- Stormont, Scotland, an ancient province in central Scotland

=== United States ===
- Stormont, Virginia, a settlement south of Urbanna in Middlesex County, Virginia

== Political entities ==
=== Canada ===
- Stormont (electoral district), a federal electoral district in Ontario
- Cornwall and Stormont, a former federal electoral district from 1882 to 1904
- Glengarry and Stormont, a former federal electoral district from 1917 to 1925

== Other ==
- HMCS Stormont (K327), a River-class frigate that served in the Royal Canadian Navy from 1943 to 1945
