= Gowrie =

Region in central Scotland

Coordinates: 56.44°N 3.23°W

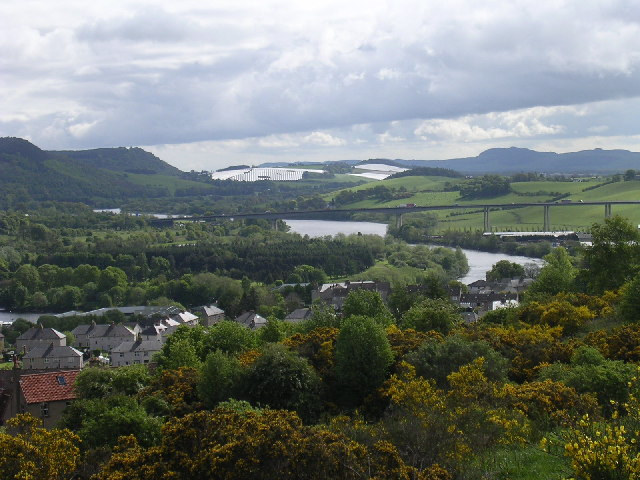
Eastern outskirts of Perth viewed from Craigie Hill. The River Tay and Friarton Bridge are both visible.

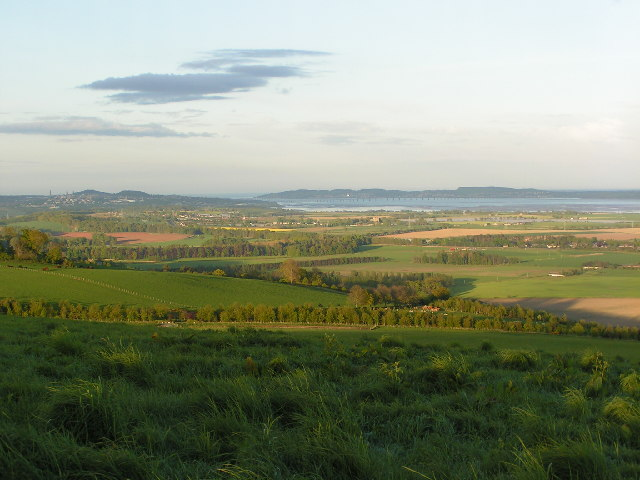
Carse of Gowrie looking towards Dundee

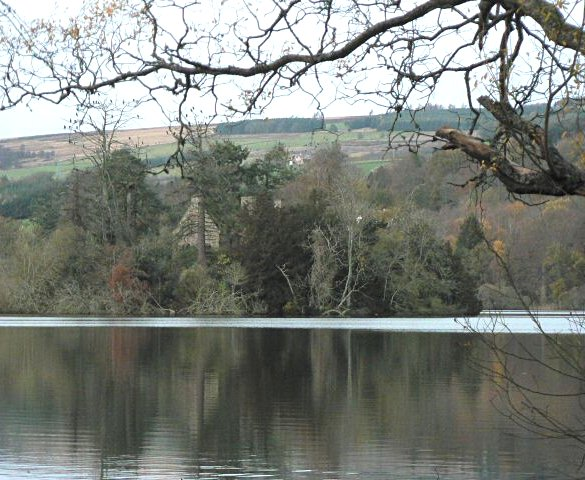
Clunie Castle on the island in Loch of Clunie, where the kings of the Scots kept a hunting lodge connected with their manor at Strathardle

Gowrie (Scottish Gaelic: Gobharaidh) is a region in central Scotland and one of the original provinces of the Kingdom of Alba. It covered the eastern part of what became Perthshire. It was located to the immediate east of Atholl, and originally included the area around Perth (and the ancient Scottish royal sites of Scone), though that was later detached as Perthia.

Its chief settlement is the city of Perth. Today it is most often associated with the Carse of Gowrie, the part of Gowrie south of the Sidlaw Hills running east of Perth to Dundee.

== Etymology ==
It is usually written as Goverin or Gouerin in the Latin of the Middle Ages. The Old Gaelic terms Circinn and Mag Gerghinn (and variants), may be related; but Circinn is often identified with the Mearns because Fordoun, Mearns, was said to have been in this area. Alex Woolf and William J. Watson both implied that the name derived from the Cenél nGabraín. The modern Gaelic for the province is Gobharaidh; unless it is derived from Gerghinn or Circinn, the earlier Gaelic form is not recorded in Gaelic orthography.

== Geography ==
Gowrie contains some of the best farmland in the whole of Scotland, a key to explaining its importance in Scottish history. The Carse of Gowrie, the southern part of the region, has traditionally been called the "Garden of Scotland".

Coupar, the location of Coupar Angus Abbey, lay at the borders of Angus with Gowrie, originally on the Gowrie side. Blairgowrie, "Plain of Gowrie", was recorded as "Blair in Gowrie" in 1604, and presumably the Blair ("plain") element has -gowrie attached to it to distinguish it from Blair in Atholl, i.e. Blair Atholl. Abernethy, where the cross of MacDuff marked the boundary of the kindred, was probably the boundary between Fothriff and Gowrie.

The following is a list of modern settlements and places of interest in the province:

- Abernyte
- Alyth
- Balhousie
- Ballindean
- Bankfoot
- Benvie
- Blair or Blairgowrie
- Cambusmichael
- Cargill
- Clunie
- Coupar Angus
- Collace
- Craigdallie
- Dunbarney (also Pottie)
- Dunsinane
- Errol
- Forteviot
- Fowlis
- Inchtuthill
- Inchture
- Inchyra
- Inveralmond
- Kilspindie
- Kinclaven
- Kinfauns
- Kinnaird
- Kinnoull
- Kirkmichael
- Longforgan (also Forgan or Forgrund)
- Luncarty
- Meikleour
- Methven
- Perth
- Pitmiddle (now deserted)
- Rait
- Redgorton
- Rhynd
- Rossie (also Rossinclerach)
- Ruthven
- Scone
- St Madoes (or Cairnie)
- Strathardle

Forteviot, physically on the Earn, was included in the St Andrews deanery of Gowrie not in Strathearn (diocese of Dunblane). It is unclear if Gowrie was thought to include places such as Dunkeld or the province of Stormont; it is likely that Gowrie's boundaries may have conceptually fluctuated according to various political changes over time.

== History ==
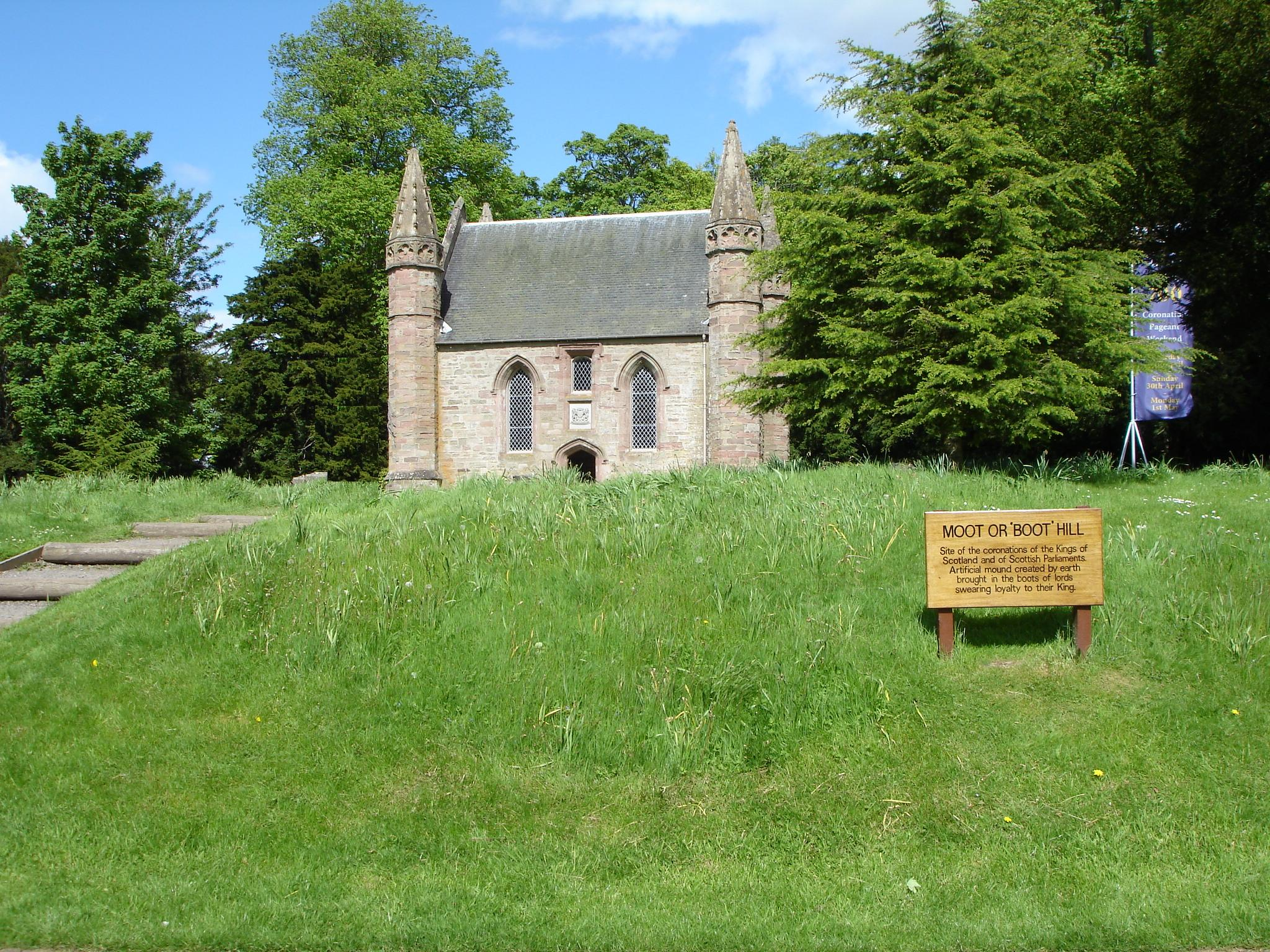
"Moot hill", Scone, and its chapel today; this was where the Kings of the Scots were inaugurated.

The Scottish royal coronation site was located in this province, at Scone. Containing sites such as Scone and Forteviot, and perhaps originally Abernethy, it was clearly the core province of the early Kingdom of Scotland. In the 12th century, when detailed records begin, the king possessed four royal manors in the province; these manors were Scone, Strathardle, Longforgan, and Coupar. Those four royal manors were held by the crown in addition to the rest of the province, which the king held as mormaer ("earl").

In either the reign of Alexander I or David I a burgh was founded in the province, located at Perth. It also had a sheriff, called the "Sheriff of Gowrie" or "Sheriff of Scone", from the 1130s until at least 1228. It is not clear if this sheriff was originally distinct from the "Sheriff of Perth", as Perth and Scone were often thought of as the same location, being only two miles apart; if they were originally distinct, they were not so by the following century.

There are judices, "Brehons", of the province of Gowrie recorded from the 12th century into the 14th century. These men were the specialist lawmen for the province, who preserved legal knowledge relevant to the provincial community, and it is likely that every province of Scotland had lawmen designated for such purposes.

Ecclesiastically, Gowrie was largely controlled by the Bishop of St Andrews; a Dean of Gowrie existed under the said bishop. Half a dozen or so of the parish churches in Gowrie were under the control of the bishops of Dunblane and Dunkeld; this meant that Deans of Gowrie also existed for these two dioceses, though no Dean of Gowrie was recorded for the diocese of Dunblane.

Gowrie was recreated as an earldom for William Ruthven, Lord Ruthven in 1581. John Ruthven, 3rd Earl of Gowrie, the second son of William Ruthven, was involved in the famous Gowrie Conspiracy of 1600, which led to the forfeiture of the earldom. The title of Earl of Gowrie was resurrected in 1945 for a descendant of the 2nd Earl.

The area covered by the sheriff of Perth – the sheriffdom – included Atholl, Breadalbane, and Strathearn, as well as Gowrie. In the mid 19th century, local government reforms replaced the ancient provinces by new Counties (shires), aligned to sheriffdom boundaries; hence, Gowrie became part of the new Perthshire.
