= Pitmiddle =

- Pitmiddle around the turn of the 20th century, looking east-northeast towards Knapp

- Location within Perth and Kinross
- OS grid reference: NO 24419 29651
- Council area: Perth and Kinross
- Lieutenancy area: Perth and Kinross
- Country: Scotland
- Sovereign state: United Kingdom
- Post town: PERTH
- Police: Scotland
- Fire: Scottish
- Ambulance: Scottish

Pitmiddle was a village in the Gowrie region of Perthshire, Scotland. It is now deserted, the last resident having left in 1938, with little evidence of its previous habitation. Its history dates back to the 12th century, and it is now a scheduled monument.

== Etymology ==
The earliest form of Pitmiddle's name was Petmeodhel (pet being a Pictish word meaning piece of land, while the origin of meodhel is unknown, but possibly means soft ground).

== Geography ==
Located 0.5 miles (1 kilometre) north of Kinnaird in the centre of the parish, Pitmiddle "was once a thriving hilltop community and home to several hundred people", but its remote location eventually led to its abandonment. (The hills referenced are the Braes of the Carse, which reach heights of around 180 metres (590 ft).)

The location is on a slope overlooking the River Tay, but sheltered from the south by Guardswell Hill, which rises to 209 m (686 ft) and to the north by Pitmiddle Hill (around 275 m (902 ft)).

== History ==
Although Pitmiddle was first called a toun in 1425, the earliest reference to the settlement is in a charter dating from 1172 to 1174. In it, William the Lion granted Ralph Rufus "Kinnaird in its right divisions except Petmeodhel belonging to Richard my clerk". This demonstrates that Pitmiddle and Kinnaird were originally royal lands: Pitmiddle belonged to the laird of Inchmartine; Kinnaird to the laird of Fingask. Pitmiddle was held by the Inchmartines for around 150 years. The village itself was never a barony, but was likely dealt with as a detached part of the barony of Longforgan.

Tenants paid cain and conveth. Cain was originally a donation to a lord in recognition of his position. Conveth was a hospitality payment made to a lord on his annual visit to his estate. These were originally payment in kind, in produce from the land. Some tenants may have been free, but most were held in some degree of serfdom.

The Ogilvy family owned five-sixths of Inchmartine and Pitmiddle in the late 15th century.

The village was not involved in the Jacobite risings of 1715 and 1745, but the neighbouring estate of Kinnaird was lost after 1715 due to its owner, Threipland of Fingask, being a supporter of the Jacobite movement.

Agricultural changes in the 18th century affected the nature of the community, eventually leading to its abandonment. By 1783, two more touns had been established on land belonging to Pitmiddle, effectively depriving it of most of its farmland. These were Newtown (now Outfield) to the north and Bank (now Guardswell) to the south.

After the Scottish Reformation, Kinnaird became a separate parish.

Today, hidden amongst farmland and woods, the only remnants of the community are a few crumbling walls and the wild redcurrant and gooseberry bushes that once grew in the residents' gardens. A 2017 survey found the ruins of nine buildings, one less than a 1970 survey.

=== Settlement and families ===
William Thomassoun was living in Pitmiddle in the 15th century as a "small but free tenant". He had a son, Richard.

In 1691, around 250 people lived in the village, along with the hamlet of Craigdallie, which was at the bottom of the hill.

On a 1783 map by James Stobie, Pitmiddle appeared as an irregularly shaped cluster of dwellings. The buildings would have been single-storied, made of wattle-and-daub and roofed with turf or thatch – the latter made from reeds from the banks of the Tay. There would be a single room for living space, with one end cordoned-off for animals. An open hearth would have provided heat, possibly with a hole in the roof to extract smoke. Domestic rubbish would have been thrown onto a midden near the entrance. Attached to the hut was a yard where hens or pigs foraged and vegetables were grown. Enclosing the settlement was a ditch, beyond which was the arable land, and separated from it by the head dyke was the pasture.

The main crops grown at Pitmeddle, per three 17th-century rent rolls, were bere (a four-eared variety of barley) and oats. These also formed the basis of the peasants' diets. Wheat was later also grown.

Pitmiddle around 1900, looking north to Gask Hill. This view was used to create a model of the settlement that was on display at Perth Museum and Art Gallery

Employees of Pitmiddle's sawmill in March 1915

Pitmiddle is believed to have had a shieling on Blacklaw (Black Hill) to the north. By 1609, these had been turned into a sheep farm.

In the 16th century, Androu Benbie (possibly Benvie) was living as a wright. Also, Edmund Jackson was fined ten shillings for "striking the common hird on the Sabbath".

In the 17th century, due to a greater survival in documentary evidence, more family names are known; these include: Anderson, Christal, Mores (possibly Morris or Moreis), Morton (possibly Mortoun), Millar, Blair, Mitchell, Whittet, Duncan, Paterson, Ogilvy, Young, Boug, Deucat (possibly Deugatt), Smyth, Christie, Robertson, Matthew, Thom, Gairdner (possibly Gardiner), Bowack (possibly Book, Boug or Boyok), Will, Hall, Muir (possibly Moor or Mure), Pirie (possibly Pierie), Martine and Lawson (possibly Lousone). In 1650, there were nineteen tenants.

Stonemason James Sr. (1832–1920) and Margaret (1833–1908) had ten children, including Margaret (1874–1952).

Early in the 19th century, the homes at Pitmiddle were rebuilt in stone, seemingly on the site of their timber predecessors. They were single storey and thatched. The floors were stone flagged and the fireplaces were built into the gables. The houses were divided into two rooms by box beds. The kitchen fireplace had hooks for kettles and pans. Ashes were kept back by a piece of iron. Around the fireplace was a fender, with a fender stool. The 1861 census showed that all households had two rooms with windows, except John Soutar's farmhouse, which had three. By 1891, there were three families each living in a cottage with three rooms with windows and two families with only one such room, the rest still having two such rooms. Attached to the houses were wooden sheds, byres and small gardens. The village's water supply was sourced from three wells.

The rebuilding of the village failed to halt Pitmiddle's demise. A once-thriving community of weavers, a blacksmith, two joiners, a tailor, a butcher and a public house was now seeing young people leaving to work in the factories in nearby Dundee and Perth.

Just under one hundred people, living in twenty-six households, made up Pitmiddle's population in 1841.

In December 1896, The Dundee Courier sent two reporters to Pitmiddle (which had seven families living there at the time) to investigate its living conditions after reports of "clearance-style" conditions on the hill. The reporters visited Maidie Mitchell and her sister, "two very old ladies" who had spent their entire lives in Pitmiddle.

By 1897, there were only sixteen inhabitants, exactly half of what there had been six years earlier.

A sawmill was active from before 1915. On an Ordnance Survey map of 1861, a "mill dam" is shown southeast of the settlement, towards today's Guardswell Farm.

Following the breakup of the Inchmartine estate in 1917, Pitmiddle was eventually bought by the family of John White and farmed from Outfield. In 1930 there were only two houses that were occupied. The final resident, James Gillies Jr. (1895–1970), left his home there for the final time on 4 January 1938. Winter storms had cancelled the sale of his farm.

== Gallery ==
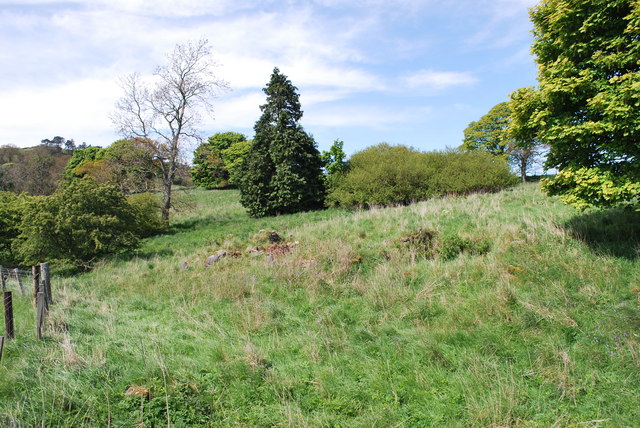
Pitmiddle village in 2009

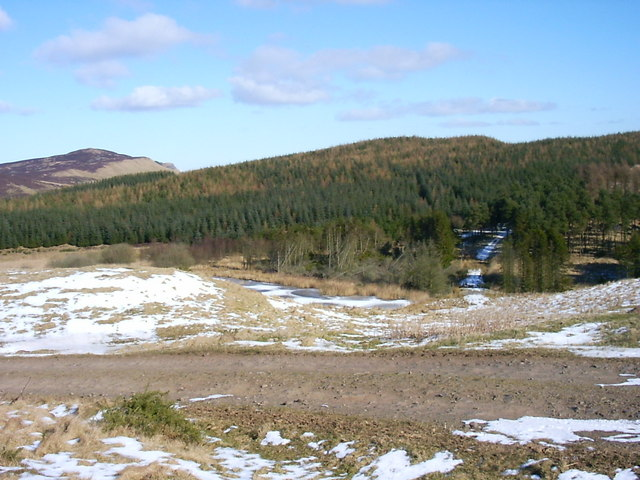
Pitmiddle Wood in 2006
