= Tales of a Grandfather =

Series of books on the history of Scotland

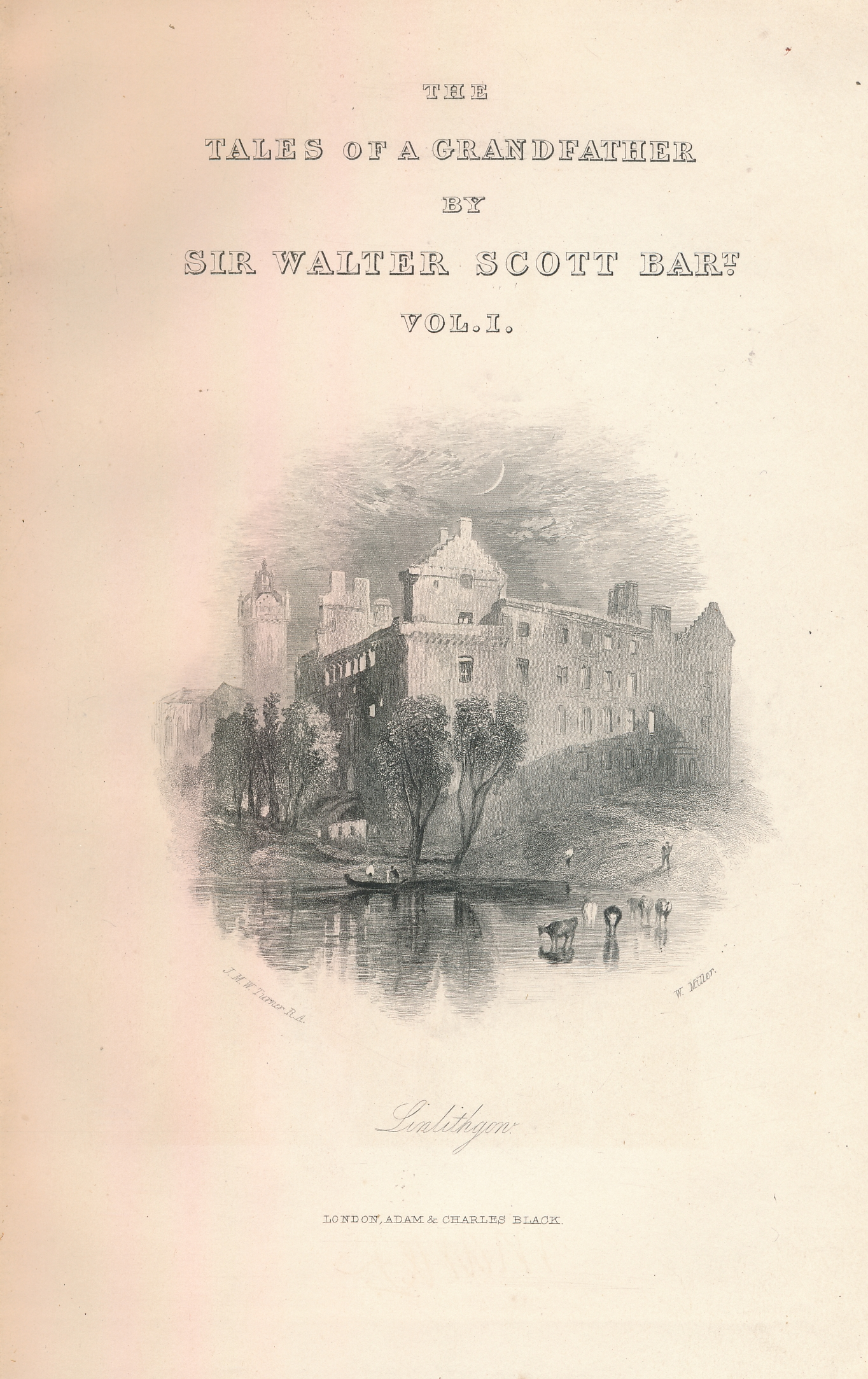
Tales of a Grandfather by Sir Walter Scott

Tales of a Grandfather is a series of books on the history of Scotland, written by Sir Walter Scott, who originally intended it for his grandson. The books were published between 1828 and 1830 by A & C Black. In the 19th century, the study of Scottish history focused mainly on cultural traditions and therefore, in Scott’s books, while the timeline of events is accurate, many anecdotes are either folk stories or inventions.

== Composition ==
In May 1827, Scott came up with the idea of writing the History of Scotland addressed to his six-year-old grandchild, John Hugh Lockhart. The project was partly inspired by the success of John Wilson Croker's Stories for Children Selected from the History of England.

The First Series comprised the period between the reign of Macbeth (1033) and the Union of the Crowns (1603), and it was published in December 1827 with the intention of introducing it to the Christmas market. The sales were so high that, before the end of the month, Cadell had already ordered a revised and enlarged edition.

In May 1828, Scott decided to write a Second Series of Tales. He ended the series on the Union of England and Scotland (1707), which was completed in September 1828 and published two months later. The Third Series, which lead up to the aftermath of the Battle of Culloden (1746), came out in December 1829.

In July 1830, he agreed to write a fourth series dealing with French history from Charlemagne to Louis XIV. Published in December 1830, the Fourth Series was as well-received by the public as the earlier Tales.

== Reception ==
The success of the Tales was accompanied by almost unanimous critical approval. In particular, according to the magazine The Athenaeum, the Tales were recognized as an important step towards encouraging writers to write for children. Scott was widely praised for being objective towards different political factions. However, Walter Scott was criticized for drawing insufficiently clear moral lessons from the described events (e.g. by Andrew Bisset in The Westminster Review). The Edinburgh Literary Journal accused Scott of avoiding controversial topics in order to gain popularity.

The manuscript of the incomplete fifth series of Tales of a Grandfather (the second series of French history, covering 1412 to 1512) was published by Northern Illinois University Press in 1996.

== Publication ==
First Edition, First Impression:

- Scott, Walter, Sir. Tales of a Grandfather; Being Stories Taken from Scottish History. Humbly Inscribed to Hugh Littlejohn, Esq. In Three Vols. Vol. I[II-III]. Printed for Cadell and Co. Edinburgh; Simpkin and Marshall, London; and John Cumming, Dublin. 1828.
- Scott, Walter, Sir. Tales of a Grandfather; Being Stories Taken from Scottish History. Humbly Inscribed to Hugh Littlejohn, Esq. In Three Vols. Vol. I[II-III]. Second Series. Printed for Cadell and Co. Edinburgh; Simpkin and Marshall, London; and John Cumming, Dublin. 1829
- Scott, Walter, Sir. Tales of a Grandfather; Being Stories Taken from Scottish History. Humbly Inscribed to Hugh Littlejohn, Esq. In Three Vols. Vol. I[II-III]. Third Series. Printed for Cadell and Co. Edinburgh; Simpkin and Marshall, London; and John Cumming, Dublin. 1830.
- Scott, Walter, Sir. Tales of a Grandfather; Being Stories Taken from the History of France. Inscribed to Master John Hugh Lockhart. In Three Vols. Vol. I[II-III]. Printed for Robert Cadell. Edinburgh; Whittaker and Co., London; and John Cumming, Dublin. 1831.

The books were also published in France in 1828 and subsequent years, in English, by the publisher John Anthony Galignani, printed by Jules Didot of the Didot Family of French printers.
