= Scone, Perth and Kinross =

Town in Perth and Kinross, Scotland

Coordinates: 56.418°N 3.404°W

Scone: Scottish Gaelic: Sgàin; Scots: Scone
- Town and former national capital
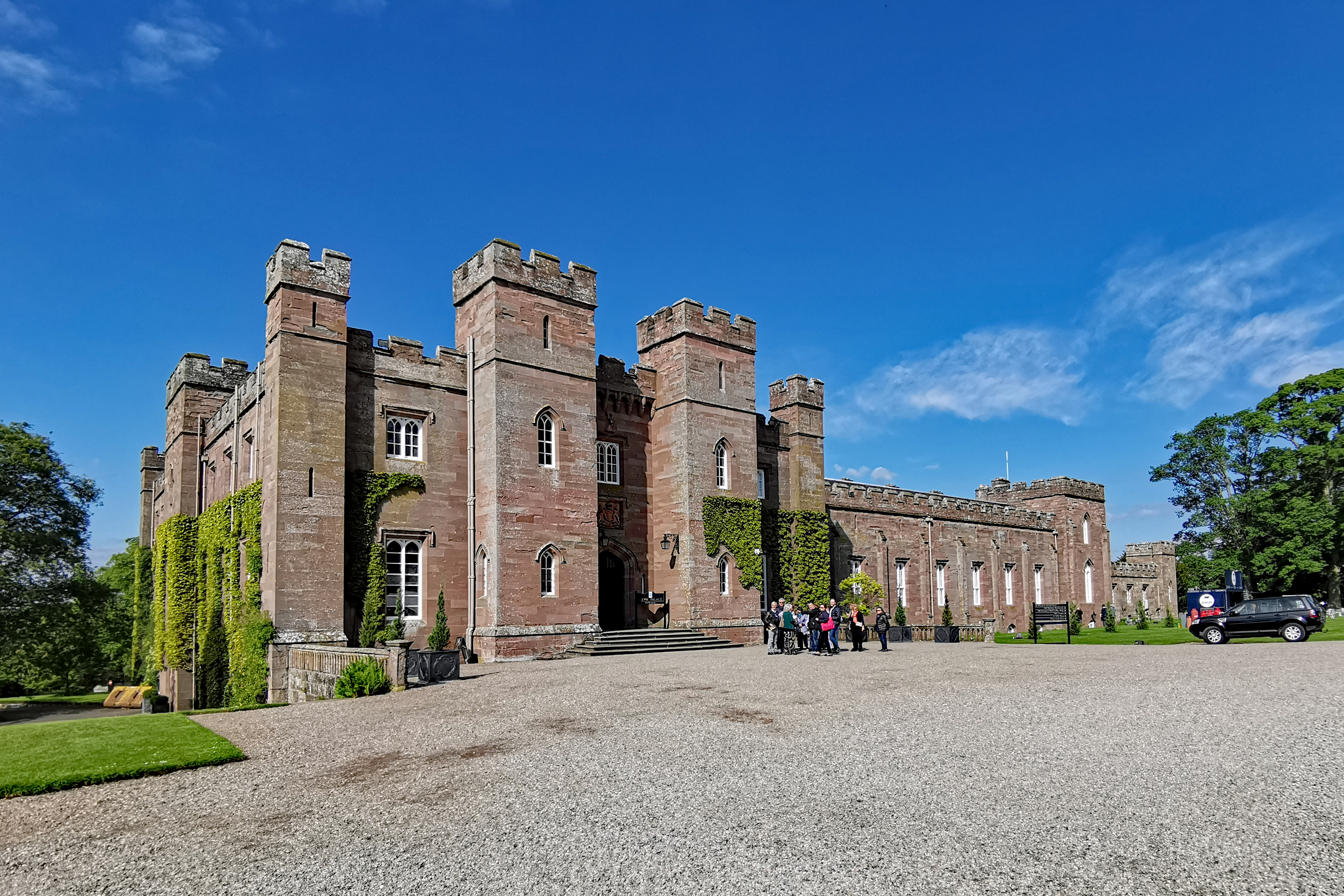
- Scone Palace

- Location within Perth and Kinross
- Population: 5,232 (2022)
- OS grid reference: NO134259
  - Edinburgh: 33 mi (53 km)
  - London: 364 mi (586 km)
- Council area: Perth and Kinross
- Lieutenancy area: Perth and Kinross
- Country: Scotland
- Sovereign state: United Kingdom
- Post town: PERTH
- Postcode district: PH2
- Dialling code: 01738
- Police: Scotland
- Fire: Scottish
- Ambulance: Scottish
- UK Parliament: Perth and Kinross-shire
- Scottish Parliament: Perthshire North

Scone (/ˈskuːn/; Scottish Gaelic: Sgàin; Scots: Scone) is a town in Perth and Kinross, Scotland. The medieval town of Scone, which grew up around the monastery and royal residence, was abandoned in the early 19th century when the residents were removed and a new palace was built on the site by the Earl of Mansfield. Hence the modern town of Scone, and the medieval settlement of Old Scone, can often be distinguished.

Both sites lie in the historical province of Gowrie, as well as the old county of Perthshire. Old Scone was the historic capital of the Kingdom of Scotland. In the Middle Ages it was an important royal centre, used as a royal residence and as the coronation site of the kingdom's monarchs. Around the royal site grew the town of Perth and the Abbey of Scone.

== Scone and Scotland ==
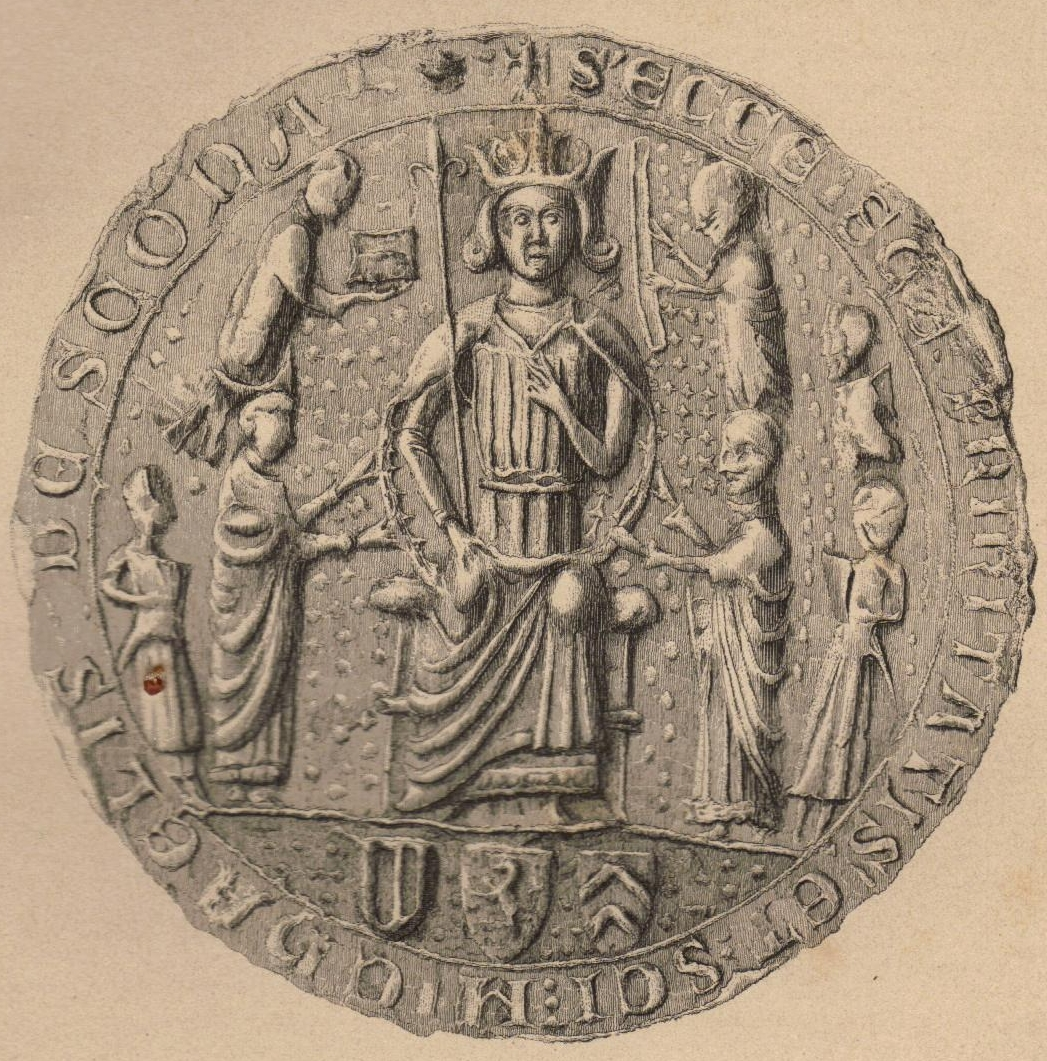
Seal of Scone Abbey, depicting the inauguration of King Alexander III of Scotland

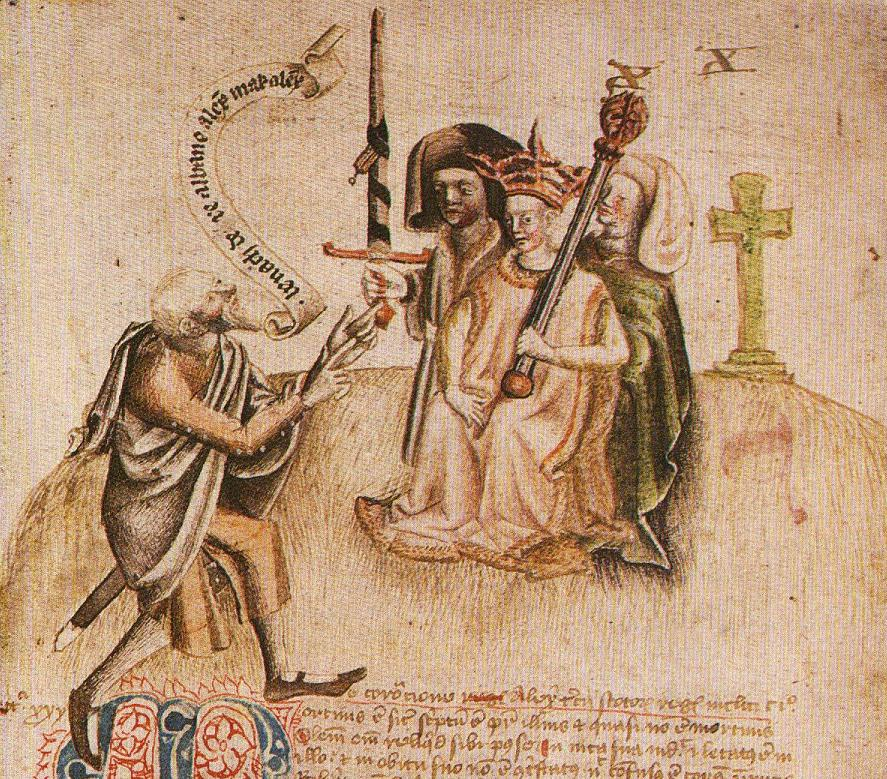
Scone was the ancient capital of Scotland and the coronation site of Scotland's kings, or the Kings of Scots. This MS illustration depicts the coronation of King Alexander III of Scotland on Moot Hill, Scone. He is being greeted by the ollamh rígh, the royal poet, who is addressing him with the proclamation "Benach De Re Albanne" (= Beannachd Dé Rígh Alban, "God Bless the King of Scotland"); the poet goes on to recite Alexander's genealogy.

Scone's association with kings and king-making gave it various epithets in Gaelic poetry; for instance, Scoine sciath-airde, "Scone of the High Shields", and Scoine sciath-bhinne, "Scone of the Noisy Shields". Scotland itself was often called or shown on maps as the "Kingdom of Scone" (or "Sconiana"), Righe Sgoinde. Similarly, Ireland was often called the "Kingdom of Tara"; Tara, like Scone, was a ceremonial inauguration site. Scone was therefore the closest thing the early Kingdom of Scotland had to a capital city. In either 1163 or 1164 King Malcolm IV described Scone Abbey as in principali sede regni nostri, "in the principal seat of our kingdom". By this point, however, the rule of the King of the Scots was not confined to the Kingdom of Scotland, which then only referred to Scotland north of the river Forth. The king also ruled in Lothian, Strathclyde and the Honour of Huntingdon, and spent much of his time in these localities too. Moreover, the king was itinerant and had little permanent bureaucracy, so Scone's role was totally unlike that of a modern capital city. But in the medieval sense Scone can in many ways be called the "capital of Scotland", and was often referred to as "the Royal City of Scone". Many comparisons can be drawn between the City of Westminster and the "City" of Scone. Both were medieval centres of royal power. Both were located beside crossing points of major rivers – the highways of the medieval period – and in geographic locations central to their respective kingdoms.

The origins of a settlement of any kind at Scone are unknown, although thought to be early medieval. The origins could pre-Roman, as there is much evidence of a well-established and sophisticated Iron Age people flourishing in this part of Scotland. Direct evidence however is lacking and so Scone's story is thought to begin in the wake of the Roman exit from Scottish history. Thus there may have been a village, a religious centre, or even a seat of power based at Scone from as early as the 5th century AD, with Scone coming into real and recorded prominence in the 9th century during the amalgamation of the Pictish and Gaelic peoples and kingdoms. Scone at this point played a crucial role in the formation and governance of the ancient Kingdom of Scotland. In the 9th century Kenneth MacAlpin came east to Scone, bringing with him a holy relic and coronation stone. As the stone was kept at Scone, it acquired the name, the Stone of Scone. In the 12th century, various foreign influences prompted the Scottish kings to transform Scone into a more convincing royal centre. Many historians have argued that the monastery or priory was founded specifically in 1114 by Alexander I of Scotland. This is strictly speaking correct, but it seems clear that this charter was simply a reaffirmation of Scone's status, and of the religious institutions there, rather than a sudden founding or establishment. There is growing evidence that there had been an early Christian cult called the Culdees based at Scone dating from at least the 9th century and possibly earlier. The Culdees were eventually merged with the Augustinian canons who arrived from Nostell Priory in Yorkshire as part of the 1114 "re-establishment". This "re-establishment" and drive to confirm Scone's status at the heart of the emerging Scottish kingdom and nation continued in 1124 when Alexander I of Scotland wrote to "all merchants of England" (omnibus mercatoribus Angliae) promising them safe passage and protection if they bring goods to Scone by sea to trade. Scone at this time lay on a navigable part of the river Tay. This was at times a major disadvantage, as the Vikings came across the North Sea to launch their lightning raids. Using the River Tay as a water route into the heart of Scottish held territory throughout the 9th and 10th centuries, these raiders pillaged towns and villages as well as religious houses such as the abbey at Dunkeld. In 904 a battle was fought in the vicinity of Scone, often referred to as the Battle of Scone, between the Scots led by King Constantine II of Scotland and the Vikings. As time went on, for various reasons the river by Scone became less navigable. At the same time ships were developing deeper hulls. It was this combination of factors that encouraged David I of Scotland to establish a new burgh at the nearest suitable location downstream of Scone, namely Perth. Perth lies 1 mile (1.6 km) from the site of medieval Scone, which is similar to the distance of Westminster Abbey from the City of London: 1.4 miles (2.3 km).

King Alexander I, thus "re-established" an Augustinian priory at Scone sometime between 1114 and 1122. In either 1163 or 1164, in the reign of King Máel Coluim IV, Scone Priory's status was enhanced and it became an abbey. The abbey had important royal functions, being next to the coronation site of Scottish kings and housing the coronation stone, the Stone of Scone, until King Edward I of England stole it during the Wars of Scottish Independence in 1295. Like other Scottish abbeys, Scone probably doubled up as a royal residence or palace as well as a hunting ground. Scone Abbey's obvious role was like that of Westminster Abbey for the Kings of England, although it appears that Scottish coronations were a more pagan ceremony, including the use of the Moot Hill (the coronation mound). It is likely that Scottish inaugurations and coronations were completed in two parts: a Christian ceremony conducted within the Abbey church and the perceivably pagan (Gaelic) ceremony upon the Moot Hill. This can be attributed, as Thomas Owen Clancy points out, to the importance in Gaelic tradition of swearing the inauguration oath in colle, on the traditional mound; the importance of which continental Christian fashions were apparently unable to overcome. But the parallel with Westminster certainly existed in the mind of Edward I, who in 1297 transferred the Abbey's coronation relics, the crown, sceptre and the stone, to Westminster in an overt act of stripping Scotland of her nationhood. Scotland's national relics and regalia were gifted to Westminster Abbey in honour of the English royal saint, Edward the Confessor.

== Traditional coronation site ==
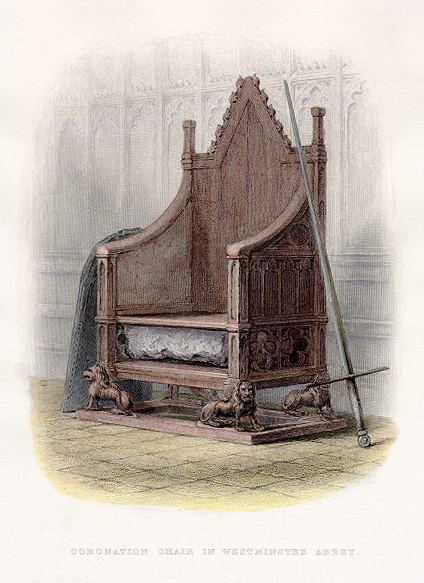
The Stone of Scone in the Coronation Chair at Westminster Abbey, 1855

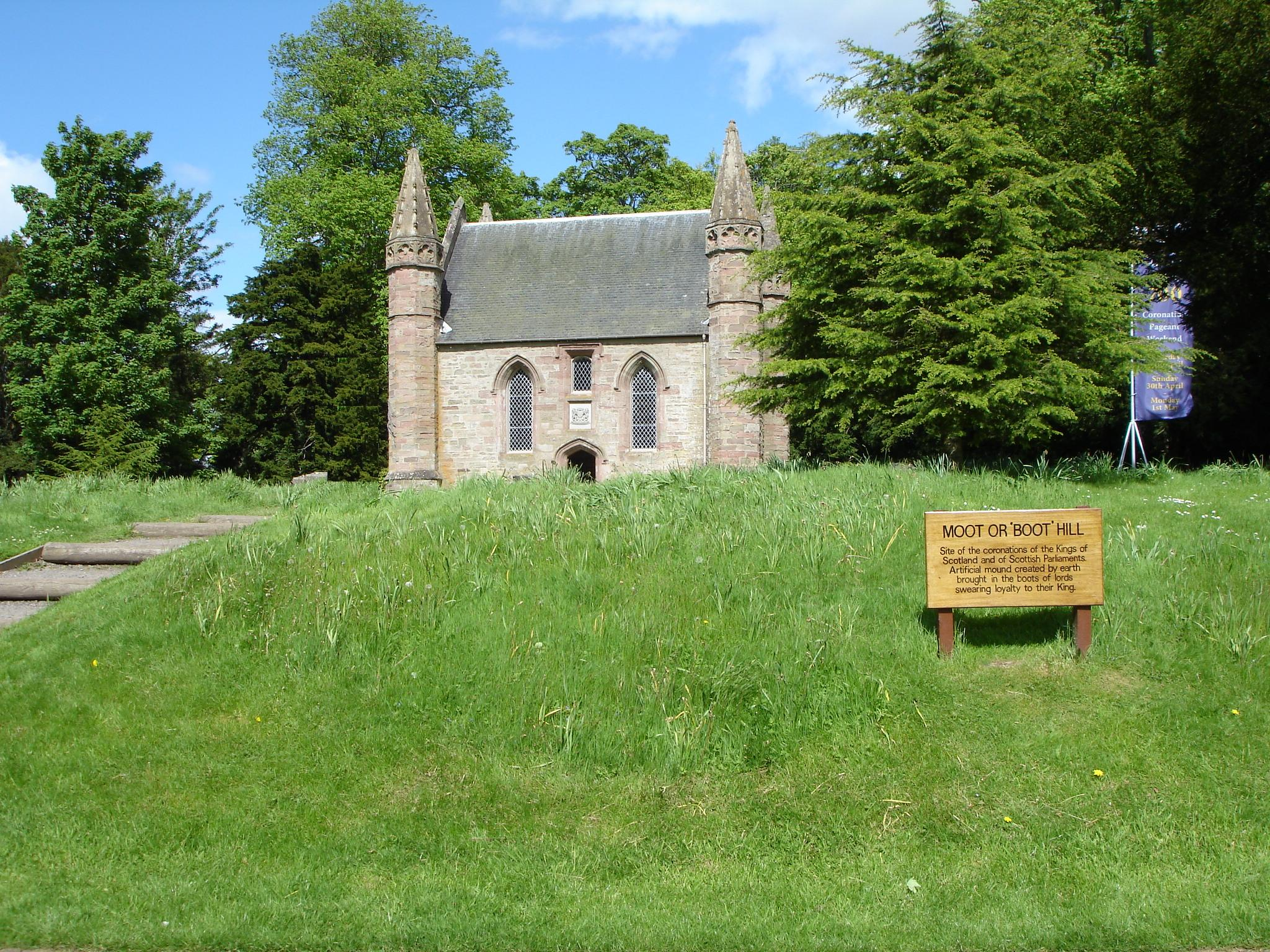
The Moot Hill and its chapel today

Like Tara, Scone would have been associated with some of the traditions and rituals of native kingship, what D. A. Binchy describes as "an archaic fertility rite of a type associated with primitive kingship the world over". Certainly, if Scone was not associated with this kind of thing in Pictish times, the Scottish kings of later years made an effort to do so. By the thirteenth century at the latest there was a tradition that Scone's famous inauguration stone, the Stone of Scone, had originally been placed at Tara by Simón Brecc, and only taken to Scone later by his descendant Fergus mac Ferchair when the latter conquered Scotland. Indeed, the prominence of such a coronation stone associated with an archaic inauguration site was something Scone shared with many like sites in medieval Ireland, not just Tara. Such "unChristian" rites would become infamous in the emerging world of Scotland's Anglo-French neighbours in the twelfth century.

Scone's role therefore came under threat as Scotland's twelfth century kings gradually became more French and less Gaelic. Walter of Coventry reported in the reign of William I of Scotland that "The modern kings of Scotland count themselves as Frenchmen, in race, manners, language and culture; they keep only Frenchmen in their household and following, and have reduced the Scots to utter servitude." Though exaggerated, there was truth in this. Apparently for this reason, when the Normanized David I of Scotland (Dabíd mac Maíl Choluim) went to Scone to be crowned there in the summer of 1124, he initially refused to take part in the ceremonies. According to Ailred of Rievaulx, friend and one time member of David's court, David "so abhorred those acts of homage which are offered by the Scottish nation in the manner of their fathers upon the recent promotion of their kings, that he was with difficulty compelled by the bishops to receive them." Inevitably then this was bound to affect the significance of Scone as a ritual and cult centre, yet the inauguration ceremony was preserved with only some innovation through the thirteenth century and Scottish kings continued to be crowned there until 1651, when Charles II became the last King of Scotland to have a coronation there (see List of Scottish monarchs). Moreover, until the later Middle Ages kings continued to reside there, and parliaments, often some of the most important parliaments in Scottish history, frequently met there too.

In 2007, archaeologists discovered the footprint of the medieval abbey allowing us to envisage where the high altar was and thus where relics such as the Stone of Scone or Stone of Destiny were housed, and where Kings of Scots such as Macbeth and Robert the Bruce were crowned before heading up to the Moot Hill for the more pagan elements of their inaugurations.

== Later history ==
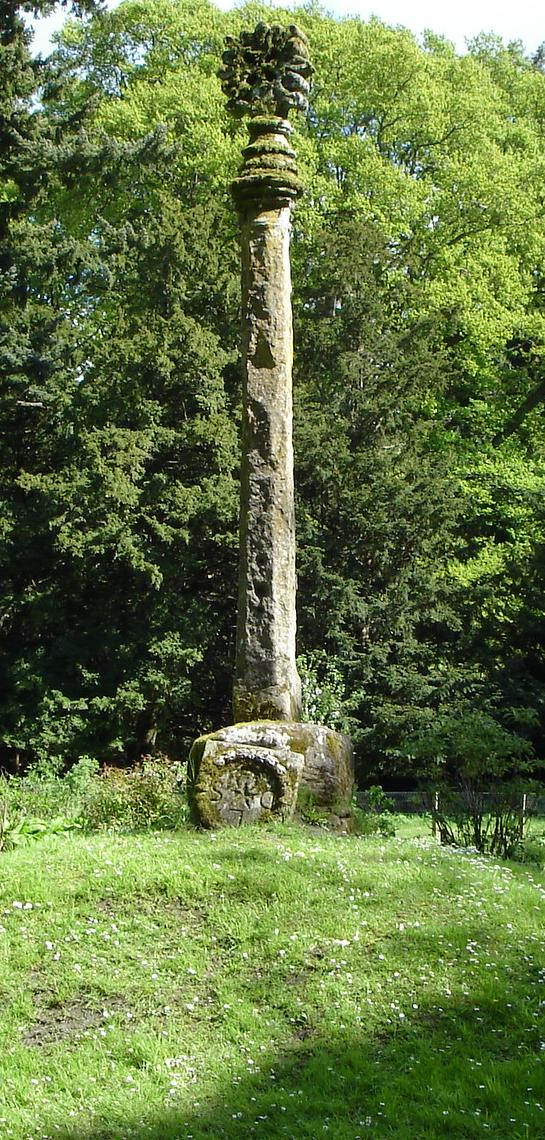
Scone mercat cross, today almost all that is left of the old village

Although Scone retained its role in royal inaugurations, Scone's role as effective "capital" declined in the later Middle Ages. The abbey itself though enjoyed mixed fortunes. It suffered a fire in the twelfth century and was subject to extensive attacks during the First War of Scottish Independence including the theft of Scotland's most revered relic, the Stone of Scone. It also suffered, as most Scottish abbeys in the period did, from a decline in patronage. The abbey became a popular place of pilgrimage for St Fergus, whose skull the Abbots kept as a relic in a silver casket by the altar. The Abbey and village also retained older festivals such as the famous Ba' of Scone, a medieval game similar to football; Ba' being short for "ball". Despite Scone's decline throughout the late medieval period, it gained some considerable fame for musical excellence through the composer Robert Carver. In the sixteenth century the Scottish Reformation ended the importance of all monasteries and abbeys in Scotland. In June 1559 the abbey was attacked by a reformist mob from Dundee having been whipped up into a frenzy by the great reformer John Knox. The abbey was severely damaged during this attack despite Knox's apparent efforts to calm the mob. Some of the canons continued on at the abbey and there is evidence suggesting that the spire of the abbey church was repaired in the aftermath of the reformation. Monastic life at Scone persisted until about 1640 at which point the Monks of Scone finally dispersed, religious life continuing to function only as part of the parish church in Scone. In 1581 Scone was placed in the new Earldom of Gowrie, created for William Ruthven. The latter was forfeited after the Gowrie Conspiracy of 1600 in which the Ruthvens made an attempt against King James VI's life. As a consequence of the Ruthven's failure and demise, Scone, in 1606 was given to David Murray of Gospertie, newly created Lord Scone, who in 1621 was promoted to Viscount Stormont. Within the parish Bessie Wright was a healer and an accused witch. The abbey/palace evidently remained in a decent state, as the Viscounts apparently did some rebuilding and continued to reside there, and it continued to play host to important guests, such as King Charles II, when he was crowned there in 1651.

It is said that there is over 1000 years of significant Scottish history at Scone. The Murrays of Scone were Jacobite, and along with their Atholl cousins were strong supporters of the exiled Stuart Monarchs of Great Britain and Ireland. This support for the Jacobites, plus Scone's status in Scottish history no doubt encouraged the Old Pretender, James III of Great Britain and Ireland, to use the Palace of Scone as his base in Scotland during the 1715 rebellion. James III having landed in Scotland on 22 December 1715, he proceeded to Perth and onto Scone which had been garrisoned by the Jacobites. James attempted to rally his supporters by releasing from Scone six Royal Proclamations. Having spent six weeks in residence at Scone, James and the Jacobite army marched (retreated) north on 30 January to Montrose. The rebellion having failed really before James had even arrived, he boarded a ship on 31 January leaving Scotland never to return. The Old Pretender was not the last Jacobite to visit Scone; his son, the famed Bonnie Prince Charlie, stayed the night at Palace of Scone during the 1745 rebellion.

It was not until 1803 that the family, the Murrays of Scone (by then the Earls of Mansfield), began constructing another palace at the cost of £70,000, commissioning the renowned English architect William Atkinson. The new Neo-Gothic palace was completed in 1812 and had 120 rooms in total. Queen Victoria, during her 1842 jubilee tour, visited Scone, staying in the Palace for just one night.

At the Disruption of 1843 the Free Church of Scotland worshipped at Pictstonshill barn. A church and school were built in 1844 despite being refused local building materials. Notable ministers included the Rev Charles Calder Stewart (1804-1876) who served from 1847 to 1873 and was succeeded by the Rev A. K. Macmurchy. A new Free Church was built in 1887.

== Modern town ==
Constructing the new palace meant destroying the old town and moving its inhabitants to a new settlement. The new village was built in 1805 as a planned village (compare Evanton, built in 1807 by its landowner for similar motives), and originally called New Scone.

It is 1 1/4 miles (2 km) east of the old location and 1 mi (1.6 km) further from Perth. Until 1997 the town was called "New Scone", but is now officially called Scone (see signposts on all approaches to the town). The town had a population of 5,232 in 2022. In 2001, 84.33% of whom are Scottish; it is demographically old even compared with the rest of Scotland.

== Notable people ==
- David Douglas (1799–1834), Scottish botanist born in Scone
- Bill Heggie (1927–1977), Professional footballer
- Fletcher Mathers (1963), Scottish actress
- Luke Graham (2004-), Professional footballer

== See also ==
- Abbot of Scone
- Hill of Tara
- Perth Airport
- Perth
- Scone Abbey
- Scone Palace
- Scotland in the High Middle Ages

== Notes ==
=== References ===
- Anderson, A. O. (1908). Scottish Annals from English Chroniclers: AD 500–1286. London: D. Nutt.
- Bannerman, John (1989). "The King's Poet and the Inauguration of Alexander III". The Scottish Historical Review. 68 (186): 120–149. JSTOR 25530415.
- Barrow, G. W. S. (1960). The Acts of Malcolm IV King of Scots 1153–1165, Together with Scottish Royal Acts Prior to 1153 not included in Sir Archibald Lawrie's "Early Scottish Charters". Regesta Regum Scottorum. Vol. i. Edinburgh.
- Barrow, G. W. S. (2003). "The removal of the stone and attempts at recovery, to 1328". In Richard Welander, David John Breeze & Thomas Owen Clancy (ed.). The Stone of Destiny: Artefact and Icon. Society of Antiquaries of Scotland Monograph Series. Vol. 22. Edinburgh: Society of Antiquaries of Scotland. pp. 199–205. ISBN 978-0-903903-22-6.
- Binchy, D. A. (1958). "The Fair of Tailtiu and the Feast of Tara". Ériu. 18: 113–138. JSTOR 30007339.
- Broun, Dauvit (2003). "Origins of the Stone of Scone as a national icon". In Richard Welander, David John Breeze & Thomas Owen Clancy (ed.). The Stone of Destiny: Artefact and Icon. Society of Antiquaries of Scotland Monograph Series. Vol. 22. Edinburgh: Society of Antiquaries of Scotland. pp. 183–197. ISBN 978-0-903903-22-6.
- Clancy, Thomas Owen (2003). "King-making and images of kingship in medieval Gaelic literature". In Richard Welander, David John Breeze & Thomas Owen Clancy (ed.). The Stone of Destiny: Artefact and Icon. Society of Antiquaries of Scotland Monograph Series. Vol. 22. Edinburgh: Society of Antiquaries of Scotland. pp. 85–105. ISBN 978-0-903903-22-6.
- Cowan, Ian B.; Easson, David E. (1976). "Medieval Religious Houses: Scotland With an Appendix on the Houses in the Isle of Man" (2nd ed.). London: Longman.
- Duncan, A. A. M. (2003). "Before coronation: making a king at Scone in the 13th century". In Richard Welander, David John Breeze & Thomas Owen Clancy (ed.). The Stone of Destiny: Artefact and Icon. Society of Antiquaries of Scotland Monograph Series. Vol. 22. Edinburgh: Society of Antiquaries of Scotland. pp. 139–167. ISBN 978-0-903903-22-6.
- Fawcett, Richard (2003). "The buildings of Scone Abbey". In Richard Welander, David John Breeze & Thomas Owen Clancy (ed.). The Stone of Destiny: Artefact and Icon. Society of Antiquaries of Scotland Monograph Series. Vol. 22. Edinburgh: Society of Antiquaries of Scotland. pp. 169–180. ISBN 978-0-903903-22-6.
- FitzPatrick, Elizabeth (2003). "Leaca and Gaelic inauguration ritual in medieval Ireland". In Richard Welander, David John Breeze & Thomas Owen Clancy (ed.). The Stone of Destiny: Artefact and Icon. Society of Antiquaries of Scotland Monograph Series. Vol. 22. Edinburgh: Society of Antiquaries of Scotland. pp. 107–121. ISBN 978-0-903903-22-6.
- Lawrie, Archibald (1905). Early Scottish Charters Prior to A.D. 1153. Glasgow: James MacLehose and Sons.
- McNeill, Peter G. B.; MacQueen, Hector L., eds. (1996). Atlas of Scottish History to 1707 (2nd ed.). Edinburgh: Scottish Medievalists and Department of Geography, University of Edinburgh. ISBN 978-0-9503904-1-3.
- O'Meara, John J., ed. (1951). Gerald of Wales: The History and Topography of Ireland. London.
- Skene, William F. (1867). Chronicles of the Picts, Chronicles of the Scots and Other Early Memorials of Scottish History. Edinburgh: H.M. General Register House.
- Skene, William F. (1869). "The Coronation Stone". Proceedings of the Society of Antiquaries of Scotland. 8 (1): 68–99. doi:10.9750/PSAS.008.68.99.
- Spearman, R. M. (1988). "The Medieval Townscape of Perth". In Michael Lynch, Michael Spearman & Geoffrey Stell (ed.). The Medieval Scottish Town. Edinburgh: J. Donald. pp. 42–59. ISBN 978-0-85976-170-3.
- Stubbs, William, ed. (1872). Memoriale Fratris Walteri de Coventria. Rolls Series. Vol. 58 (ii). London: Longman & Co. ISBN 978-1-144-07765-3.
