= St David's Chapel =

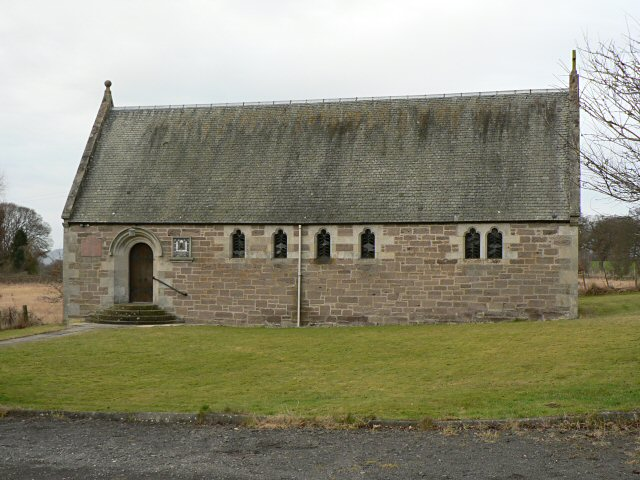
- The southern (main) façade of the chapel
- St David's Chapel
- 56°27′06″N 3°26′52″W
- Location: Cambusmichael Road; Stormontfield, Perth and Kinross
- Country: Scotland
- Denomination: Church of Scotland

History
- Status: Open

Architecture
- Groundbreaking: 15 August 1896
- Completed: 1897, 129 years ago

Specifications
- Length: 52 feet (16 m)
- Width: 14.5 feet (4.4 m)

St David's Chapel is a Church of Scotland church in Stormontfield, Perth and Kinross, Scotland. Now a Category B listed building, it was built in 1897, to a design by architect Alexander Marshall Mackenzie.

Mackenzie was given the brief that the church should "be able to accommodate 100 people, be of early English design and be built at an estimated cost of £550". A bellcote is shown in the original plans but was not included in the construction.

According to the Perthshire Advertiser, the church was dedicated on 30 July 1897.

Where yew trees now arch above the entrance path to the main door there once was a wooden footbridge spanning over Colen Burn.

The chapel's sundial, to the right of the chapel entrance, was gifted to the church by R. W. R. Mackenzie. It is cast from lead and decorated with thistles and gilding. The sundial was stolen in January 1985, but it was found on British Rail ground in the Craigie area of Perth.

== Construction personnel ==
The individuals responsible for the chapel's construction:

- Messrs Bruce and Miller (masons)
- Messrs Stewart and McFarlane (carpenters)
- Mr Chalmers (slater)
- Mr J. Whyte (painter)
- Mr Pennycook of Stormontfield (superintendent)

== See also ==
- List of listed buildings in Scone, Perth and Kinross
