= Stormont, Scotland =

Stormont was one of the original provinces of the Kingdom of Alba. It covered an area of what became Perthshire. It was located to the immediate south of Atholl and west of Gowrie, in a zone 7 miles wide between the River Ericht and River Isla in the east and a point near Dunkeld in the west.

The name survives in local place-names at Stormontfield and Stormont Loch. Remains of a castle or residence were visible on an island in Stormont Loch in 1843. Stormont was a property of the Murrays of Gospertie, one of whom, Sir David, was made Viscount Stormont in 1621. The title is now held by junior members of the family of the Earls of Mansfield.
