= Bessie Wright =

Scottish healer convicted of witchcraft

Bessie Wright (recorded 1611–1628) was a healer in Perthshire who was accused of witchcraft in 1611, 1626 and then again in 1628.

Not a lot is known about Bessie Wright's early life, but she was recorded as a healer in Scone parish, Perthshire by 1611. Famed as a healer, Wright was unusual in the area for having a 'medical book' which she claimed was over 1,000 years old and had been used by her father and grandfather. While Wright claimed to be unable to read the book, her son Adam Bell read out extracts to her. The Church of Scotland was unhappy with Wright's access to this book and in 1611, William Cowper, minister of Perth, demanded that she hand it over to the Church. When Wright came into contact with the authorities again in 1626, she mentioned that her book had been taken by Cowper or Archibald Steedman, the beadle.

Wright continued as a healer until 1626 when she was investigated by the Church for using unacceptable healing practices in Scone and told to stop practising in the burgh of Perth.

In 1628, Wright was practising again and was imprisoned in the Perth Tollbooth. When her family complained about the treatment of Wright, she was released under a £1,000 bond paid by her son.

Bessie Wright was not subject to execution like other women accused of witchcraft in Scotland, for example Agnes Finnie or victims of the Great Scottish Witch Hunt, in part because she was not accused of demonic practice or a pact with the devil. Instead, Wright was accused of witchcraft under the Witchcraft Act of 1563 because of resentment and failed healing rituals. The Book of Perth (1847) noted that she 'seems to have been a very harmless and useful person'. Bessie Wright disappears from the records after her 1628 imprisonment.

== In popular culture ==
Bessie Wright has been the inspiration for Halloween spectaculars at Scone Palace in recent years, including in 2017.
