= Old Scone mercat cross =

Scottish memorial cross

- Old Scone market cross
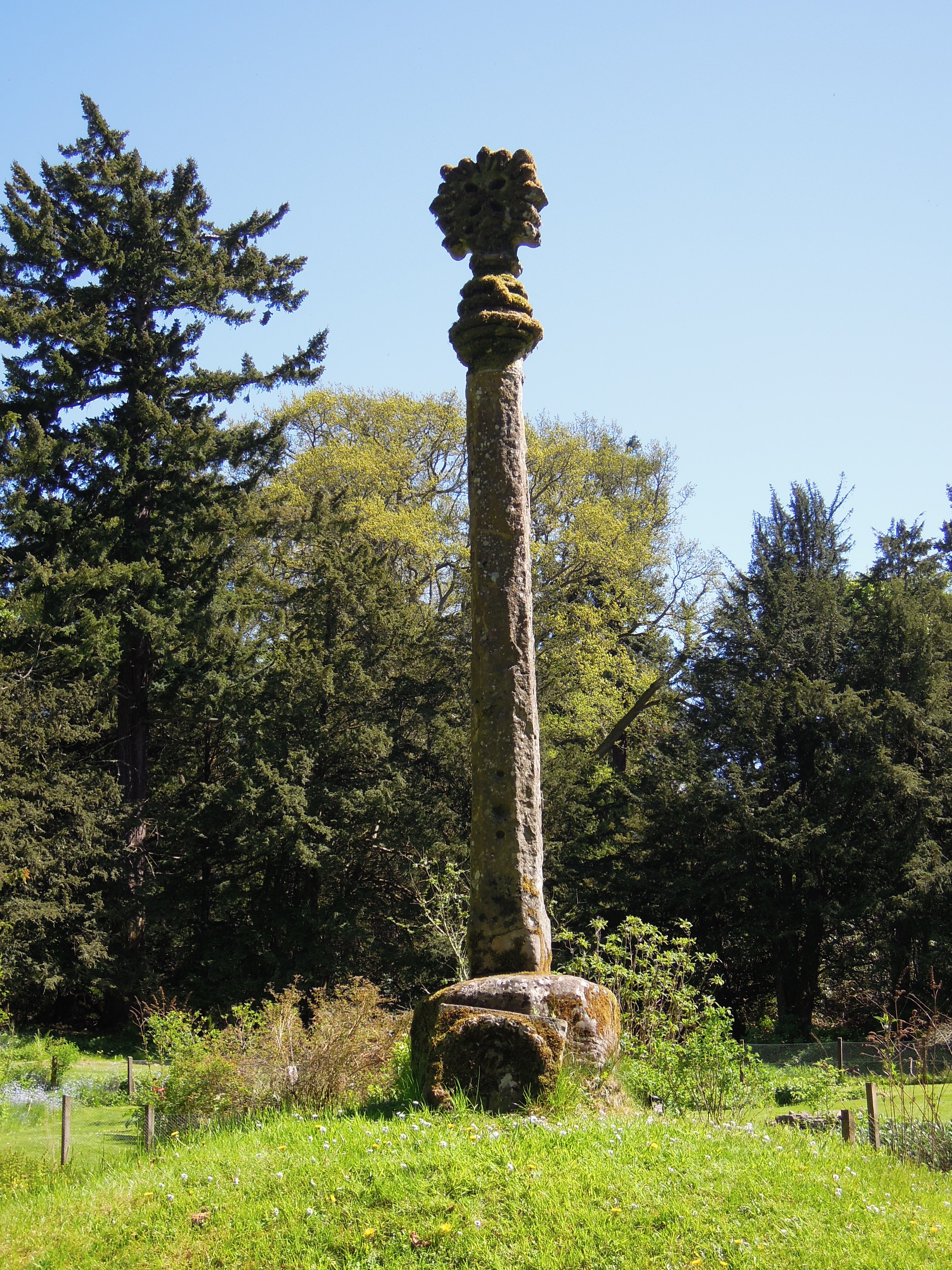
- The mercat cross in 2013

- Location within Perth and Kinross
- 56.423765°N 3.435058°W
- Location: Scone Palace, Perth and Kinross, Scotland

History
- Built: 12–15th century

Old Scone mercat cross (also known as Old Scone market cross) is the sole remnant of the ancient Scottish town of Old Scone, which was dissolved in 1803–1804 upon the development of today's New Scone.

Now in the grounds of Scone Palace, albeit a few yards south of the cross's original location, it was erected sometime in the late Middle Ages and is now a Category A listed structure.

The cross has an octagonal shaft with a moulded capital and foliated cross. Other fragments sit at its base.

== Gallery ==
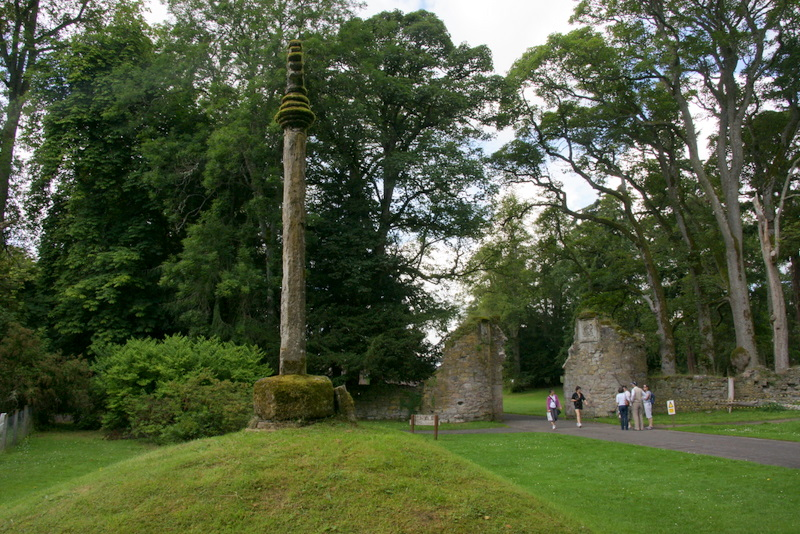
The cross in 2011

== See also ==
- Mercat cross
