= Gowrie conspiracy =

1600 event involving the Earl of Gowrie and James VI of Scotland

The Gowrie conspiracy was a series of events unfolding in Scotland on 5 August 1600. Although the facts of the actual attack and deaths of the Earl of Gowrie and his brother are known, the circumstances by which that sequence of events came about remain a mystery.

Ruthven had reason to seek vengeance on James VI of Scotland as he had executed his father in response to the Ruthven Raid, which in turn was inspired by high debts of the King to the Ruthven family. Getting rid of the family got rid of the debts, especially if the family was stripped of all ownership for reason of "treason". Rumours circulated that Anne of Denmark was involved in the Gowrie Conspiracy, and it was said that a letter had been found from her to the Earl of Gowrie, urging him to visit the royal court and enclosing the gift of a valuable bracelet.

== Events ==
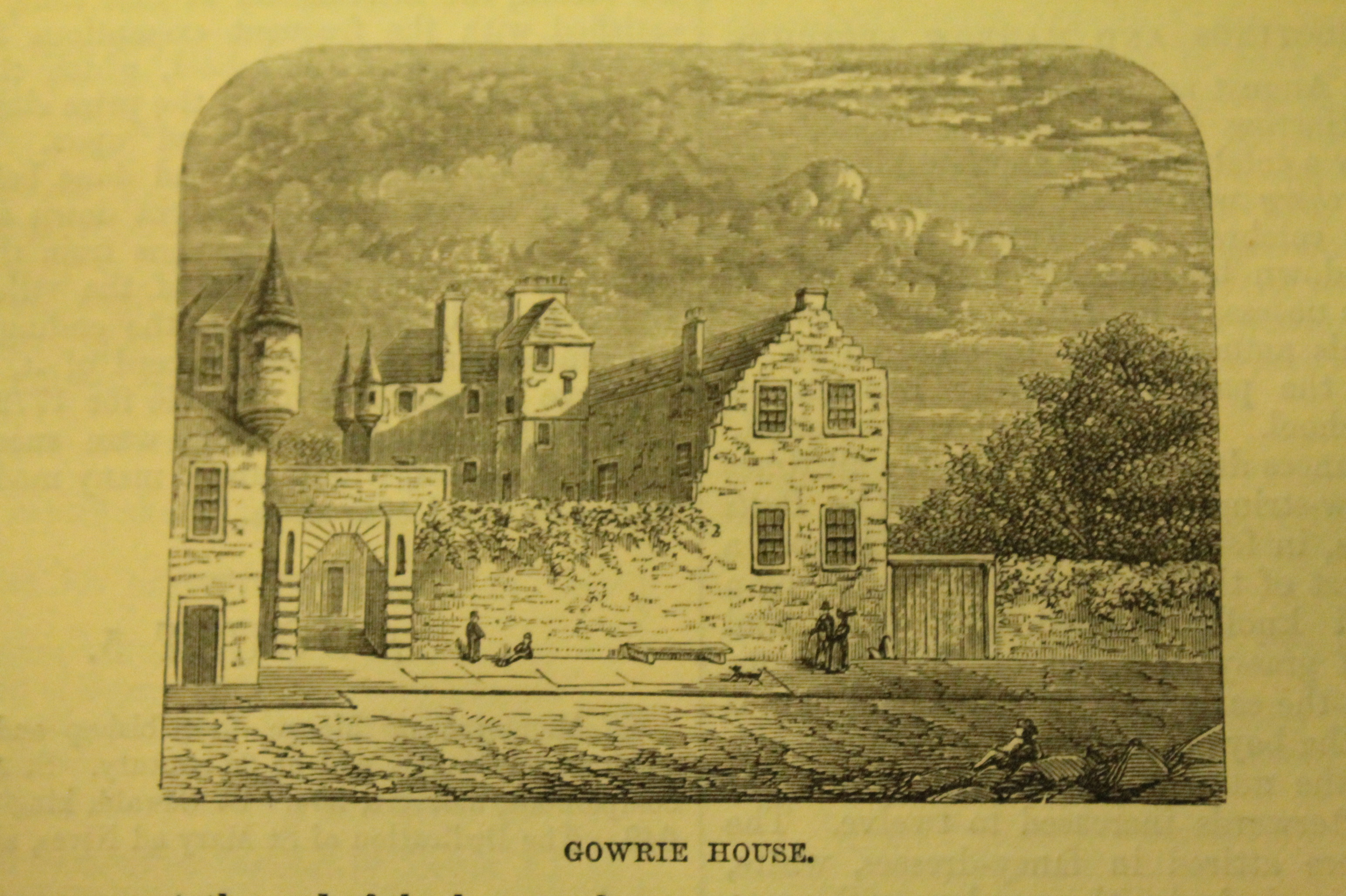
Gowrie House in Perth c. 1650

On 5 August 1600, King James VI of Scotland rose early to hunt around the neighbourhood of Falkland Palace, where he was residing, about 14 miles (23 km) from Perth. As he set out, accompanied by Ludovic Stewart (the Duke of Lennox), John Erskine (the Earl of Mar), Thomas Erskine (the Earl of Kellie, first cousin to John) and others, he was approached by twenty-year-old Alexander Ruthven, a younger brother of John Ruthven, the Earl of Gowrie. Alexander advised the king that he and his brother had detained a foreigner carrying a large quantity of money at Gowrie House in Perth, and urged James to interrogate the man himself. The king initially hesitated but ultimately agreed to ride to Perth after the hunt ended. Alexander Ruthven dispatched a servant, Henderson, to inform his brother that the king would be arriving at Gowrie House later in the day. Alexander then urged the king to lose no time, demanding that he keep the matter secret from his courtiers, and that he bring as small a retinue as possible to Gowrie House.

James, in the company of ten to fifteen retainers, arrived at Gowrie House around one o'clock in the afternoon. Despite having received word earlier that the king would be arriving, Gowrie himself made no preparations, thus giving the impression of having been taken by surprise. After a small meal, for which he was kept waiting an hour, King James, forbidding most of his retainers to follow him, went with Alexander up the main staircase and passed through two chambers and two doors, both of which Gowrie locked behind them, into a turret-room at the angle of the house, with windows looking on the courtyard and the street. Here James expected to find the mysterious prisoner with the foreign gold, but was instead threatened with bodily harm. He found an armed man, who was actually Gowrie's servant, Henderson. Alexander immediately put on his hat and, drawing Henderson's dagger, presented it to the king's breast with threats of instant death if James opened a window or called for help. An allusion by Alexander to the execution of his father, the 1st Earl of Gowrie, drew from James a reproof of Alexander's ingratitude for various benefits conferred on his family. Alexander then uncovered his head, declaring that James's life should be safe if he remained quiet; then, committing the king to the custody of Henderson, he left the turret—ostensibly to consult with his brother—and locked the door behind him.

While Alexander was absent the king questioned Henderson, who professed ignorance of any plot and of the purpose for which he had been placed in the turret. At James's request, Henderson opened one of the windows and was about to open the other when Alexander returned. Whether or not Alexander had actually been to see his brother is uncertain. Gowrie had meantime spread news below that the king had taken horse and ridden away, and the royal retinue were seeking their horses to follow him.

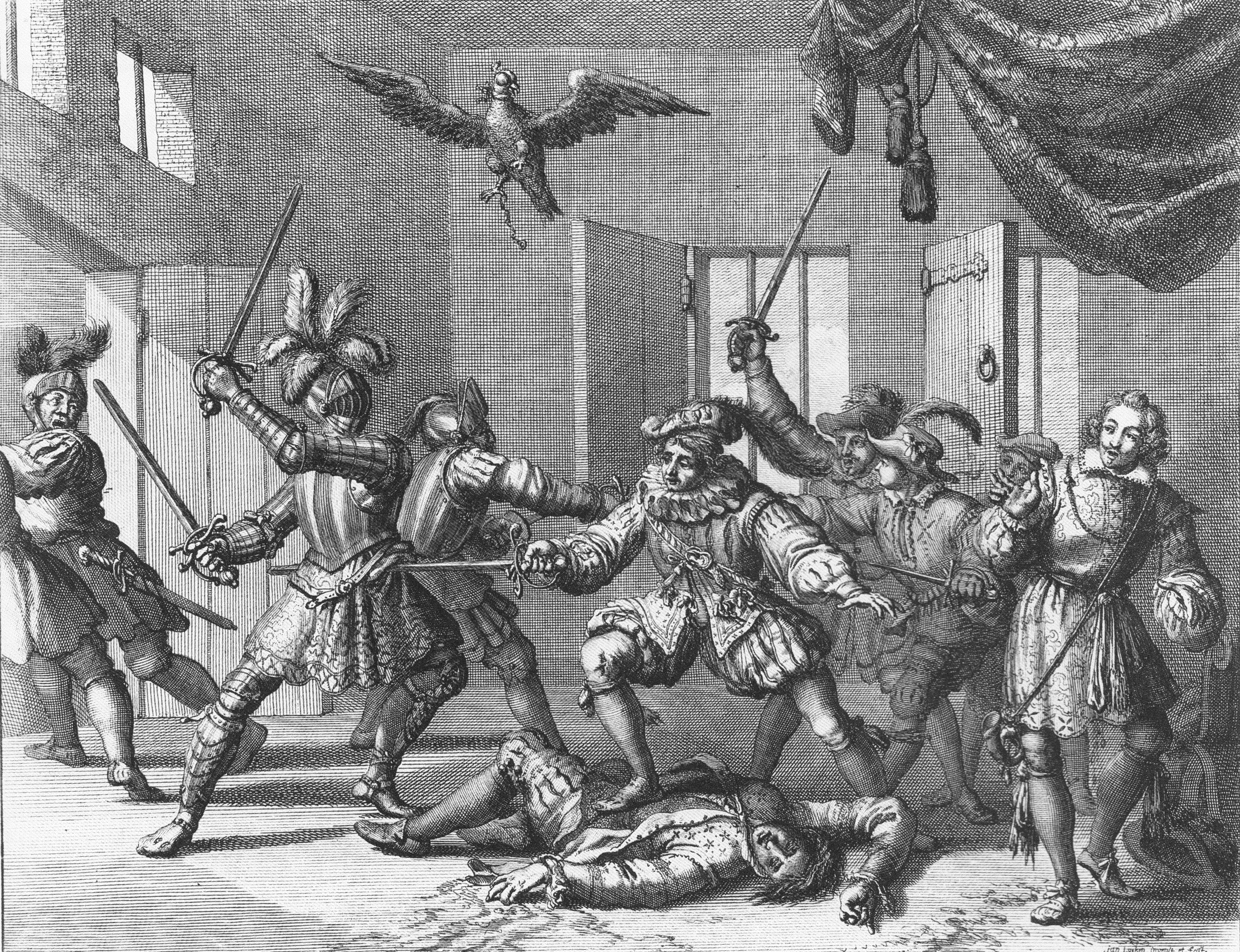
The mayhem at Gowrie House imagined by the Dutch illustrator Jan Luyken

Alexander, on re-entering the turret, attempted to bind the king's hands. A struggle ensued, in the course of which the king was seen at the window by some of his followers below in the street, who also heard him cry "treason" and call for help to the Earl of Mar. Gowrie pretended not to hear these cries, but kept asking what was the matter. Lennox, Mar and most of the other lords and gentlemen ran up the main staircase to help the king, but were stopped by the locked door, which they spent some time trying to batter down.

John Ramsay (afterwards the Earl of Holdernesse), noticing a small, dark stairway leading directly to the inner chamber adjoining the turret, ran up it and the door was then unlocked by Henderson. There he found the king struggling with Alexander. Drawing his dagger, Ramsay wounded Alexander, who was then pushed down the stairway past the king. Thomas Erskine, summoned by Ramsay, now followed up the small stairs with Dr Hugh Herries, and the two killed Alexander with their swords. John Ruthven, entering the courtyard with his stabler Thomas Cranstoun and seeing his brother's body, rushed up the staircase after Erskine and Herries, followed by Cranstoun. In the melée he was also killed. Some commotion was caused in the town by the noise of these proceedings but it quickly subsided, though the king did not deem it safe to return to Falkland Palace for some hours.

== Theories ==
A number of scenarios have been proposed to explain the events:

1. that Ruthven and his brother concocted a plot to murder or, more probably, kidnap King James and that they lured him to Gowrie House for this purpose;
2. that James paid a surprise visit to Gowrie House with the intention of killing the two Ruthvens;
3. that the tragedy was the outcome of an unplanned brawl which followed an argument between the King and one of the Ruthvens;
4. that James, who was attracted to men, made amorous advances on Alexander Ruthven and was repulsed by the earl, leading to a struggle resulting in the latter's death.

Additionally, it has been suggested that Anne of Denmark was complicit in the plot.

Proponents of the theory that James and Alexander struggled following amorous advances from the king include George Payne Rainsford James, Andrew Bisset, Archibald L. Goodall, and William Roughead. Arbuckle comments, "There is not the slightest hint of this in any of the contemporary evidence". In a footnote, Willson mentions the possibility "that the King retired with the Master for an immoral purpose" before adding, "This is pure guess-work for which there is no proof".

To understand the relative probabilities of these hypotheses, regard must be paid to the condition of Scotland in 1600.

- Plots to capture the sovereign for the purpose of coercing his actions were frequent, more than one had been successful, and the Ruthven family had taken an active part in several of them.
- Relations between England and Scotland were more than usually strained, and the Earl of Gowrie was reckoned in London among the adherents of Elizabeth. The Kirk party, being at variance with James, looked upon Gowrie as a hereditary partisan of their cause, and had recently sent an agent to Paris to recall him to Scotland as their leader.
- Gowrie was believed to be James's rival for the succession to the English crown. As regards the question of motive, the Ruthvens believed their father to have been killed in treachery, and his widow insulted by the king's favourite minister.
- James owed a large sum of money to the Earl of Gowrie's estate, and popular gossip credited either Ruthven with being the lover of the queen.

Although the evidence on these points, and on every circumstance connected with the event itself, has been examined by historians of the Gowrie conspiracy, the mystery has never been entirely dispelled. The two most recent studies subscribe to the kidnap theory. W. F. Arbuckle's study of 1957 favours the kidnapping that went wrong, while Maurice Lee proposes that James went to Gowrie House believing Ruthven was a conduit for political intelligence from London (that the pot of gold was a flimsy cover story), and when he arrived with an unexpectedly large retinue, Alexander realised that a successful kidnapping was not possible and attempted to take the King's life to avenge his father's death.

Most modern research, in the light of materials inaccessible or overlooked until the 20th century, points to the conclusion that there was a conspiracy by Ruthven and his brother to kidnap the king. If this is true, it follows that the second theory, that James went to Gowrie House to specifically kill the Ruthvens, is invalid and that his own account of the occurrence, in spite of the glaring improbabilities which it involved, was substantially true.

== Sources ==
- Juhala, Amy L. (2004). "Ruthven, John, third earl of Gowrie (1577/8–1600)". Oxford Dictionary of National Biography (online ed.). Oxford University Press. doi:10.1093/ref:odnb/24371. (Subscription, Wikipedia Library access or UK public library membership required.)
