= Bill Heggie =

Scottish footballer (1927–1977)

Personal information
- Full name: William Campbell Heggie
- Date of birth: 7 June 1927
- Place of birth: Scone, Scotland
- Date of death: 7 November 1977 (aged 50)
- Place of death: Birkenhead, Wirral, England
- Position: Centre forward

Senior career*
Years	Team	Apps	(Gls)
- Jeanfield Swifts
1950–1951	New Brighton	10	(5)
1951–1952	Leeds United	0	(0)
1952–1955	Wrexham	33	(13)
1954–1955	Accrington Stanley	1	(0)
1955–1957	New Brighton		
Total		44	(18)
- * Club domestic league appearances and goals

William Campbell Heggie (7 June 1927 – 7 November 1977) was a Scottish professional footballer who played as a centre forward in the Football League.
