= Kinnaird, Gowrie =

Coordinates: 56.443460°N 3.231087°W

Kinnaird: Scottish Gaelic: An Ceann Àrd
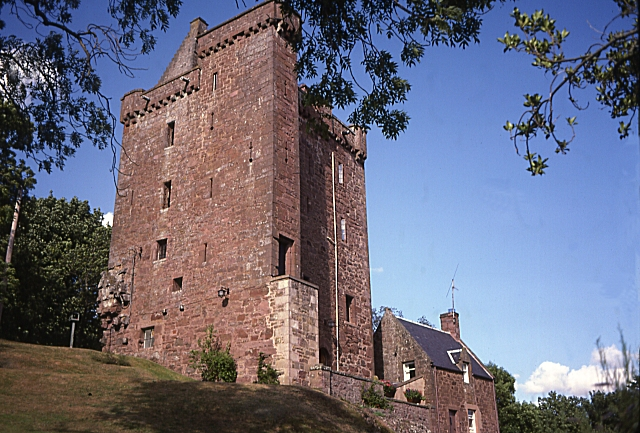
- Kinnaird Castle

- Location within Perth and Kinross
- OS grid reference: NO242286
- Council area: Perth and Kinross
- Lieutenancy area: Perth and Kinross
- Country: Scotland
- Sovereign state: United Kingdom
- Post town: PERTH
- Postcode district: PH14
- Dialling code: 01828
- Police: Scotland
- Fire: Scottish
- Ambulance: Scottish
- Scottish Parliament: North Tayside; North East Scotland

Kinnaird (Scottish Gaelic: An Ceann Àrd, "high headland") is a village in Gowrie, Perthshire, Scotland.

It is notable for its 15th-century castle. The four-storeyed Kinnaird Castle was a stronghold of the Threiplands of Fingask, a local Jacobite family. The castle was restored heavily by then owner Stuart Stout in the 1960s, and was later the venue for his 1988 wedding to Audrey Gregory, who reportedly became "known as the Lady of Kinnaird".

The area is also home to an early-19th-century parish church. In the 18th century, it was the home of the Reverend James Adams, who contributed to the Marrow Controversy in the church of Scotland.

The Carse of Gowrie, in which the village is located, is an agricultural district of Perthshire.

== Notable people ==
- Robert Carnegie, Lord Kinnaird (c. 1490–1566), born in the castle
- James Mylne (1757–1839), philosopher
