= Andrew Bisset (barrister) =

Scottish barrister and writer on law of the United Kingdom

Andrew Bisset (28 November 1801 in Montrose, Angus – 28 February 1891 Fortis Green, London), was a Scottish barrister and historical writer. His writing was an influence on Henry George, who cites Bisset’s Strength of Nations, in the notes to Progress and Poverty.

== Life ==
He graduated B.A. from Magdalene College, Cambridge in 1826. He was called to the bar at Lincoln's Inn in 1839.

He was a researcher for Richard Cobden, probably from the early 1840s, preparing a report in 1845 on agricultural districts. In the 1850s he worked for the Anti-Corn Law League; his father-in-law was T. P. Thompson, of the League. He had a commission to write on English history, particularly land law. His later writings moved into Parliamentary history.

== Works ==
- A Practical Treatise on the Law of Estates for Life (1842)
- Memoirs and papers of Sir Andrew Mitchell, K. B. (1850) editor
- On the Strength of Nations (1859)
- Omitted Chapters of the History of England from the death of Charles I to the battle of Dunbar (1864)
- History of the Commonwealth of England (1867), revised from Omitted Chapters
- Essays on Historical Truth (1871)
- The History of the Struggle for Parliamentary Government in England (1877)
- A Short History of the English Parliament (1883) 2 vols.
- Notes on the Anti-Corn Law Struggle (1884)

== See also ==
- Henry George
- Richard Cobden
