= Stormontfield =

Coordinates: 56°27′01″N 3°27′18″W

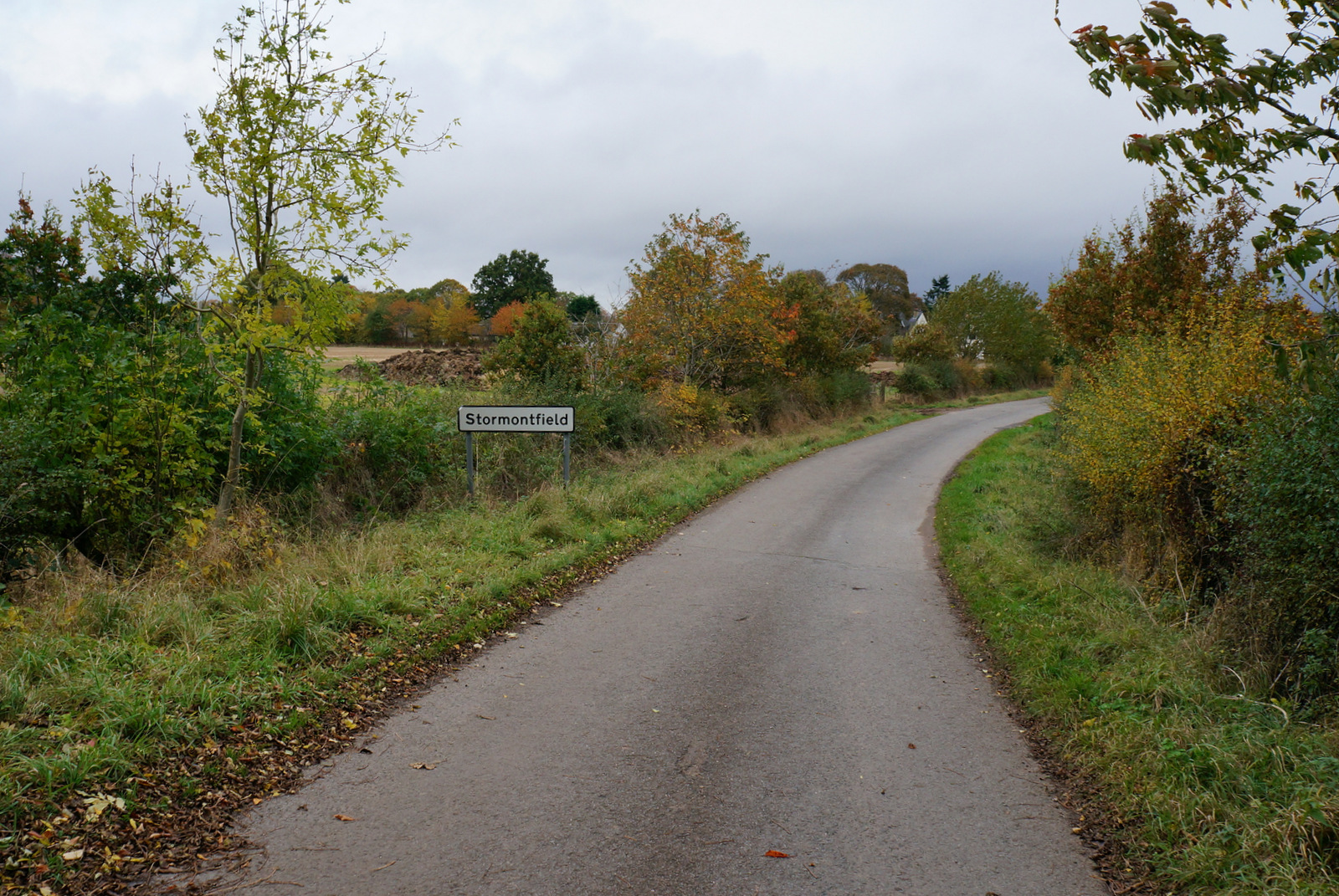
- Entering Stormontfield from the south

- Location within Perth and Kinross
- Council area: Perth and Kinross
- Country: Scotland
- Sovereign state: United Kingdom
- Post town: PERTH
- Dialling code: 01738
- Police: Scotland
- Fire: Scottish
- Ambulance: Scottish

Stormontfield is a village in Perth and Kinross, Scotland, about 4 miles (6 kilometres) north of Perth. It is located on the eastern banks of the River Tay, on the opposite side to Luncarty.

== St. David's Chapel ==
St David's Chapel, a Category B listed building, is located on Cambusmichael Road, the village's main thoroughfare. It dates to 1897 and is the work of Alexander Marshall Mackenzie. The chapel was constructed to serve workers at a local bleach mill. It closed in 2017.

In 2019, the chapel was converted to a private home, retaining the existing stained glass and exterior details. From St. David’s Chapel the road runs south parallel to a mill lade which runs into the Tay at Waulkmill. Cut in 1847, the three-mile long channel powered a bleachworks in the 1820s. Stormontfield’s newer houses are built on the site of the old bleachworks, which closed after a fire in 1971.

== Old Waulkmill Ferry ==
South of Stormontfield is the site of the Old Waulkmill Ferry where a ferry service ran across the Tay river. Still standing today is the Ferryman’s bothy, also a Category B listed building. A painted Table of Fares attached to the bothy's east gable shows that it cost a pedestrian one penny for the crossing in 1920.

The Waulkmill Ferry operated the crossing between Waulkmill of Innerbuist on the east bank, and “The Lands of Hatton” in Luncarty on the west bank. Initially a rowboat ferry was used, then, from the mid-nineteenth century, a twin hulled, pontoon-type ferry boat operated using a chain and cogwheel. A 1903 photograph in the Wood&Son collection at the Perth museum shows the pontoon ferry in action.

== Gallery ==
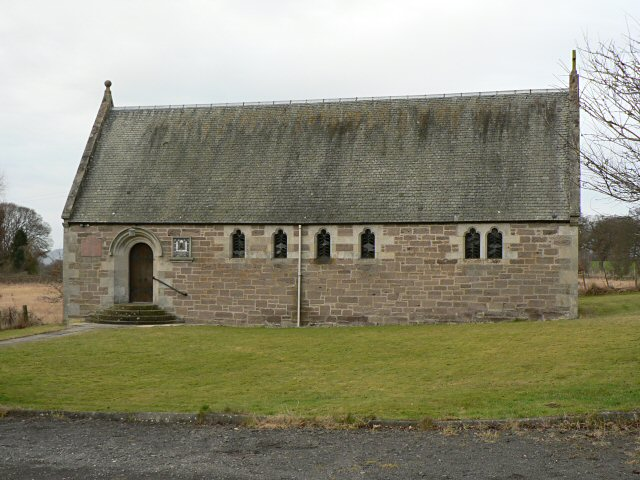
St. David's Chapel, Stormontfield

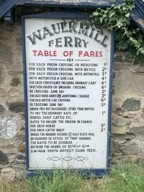
Old Waulkmill Ferryman's Bothy
