= Oban Sheriff Court =

Judicial building in Oban, Scotland

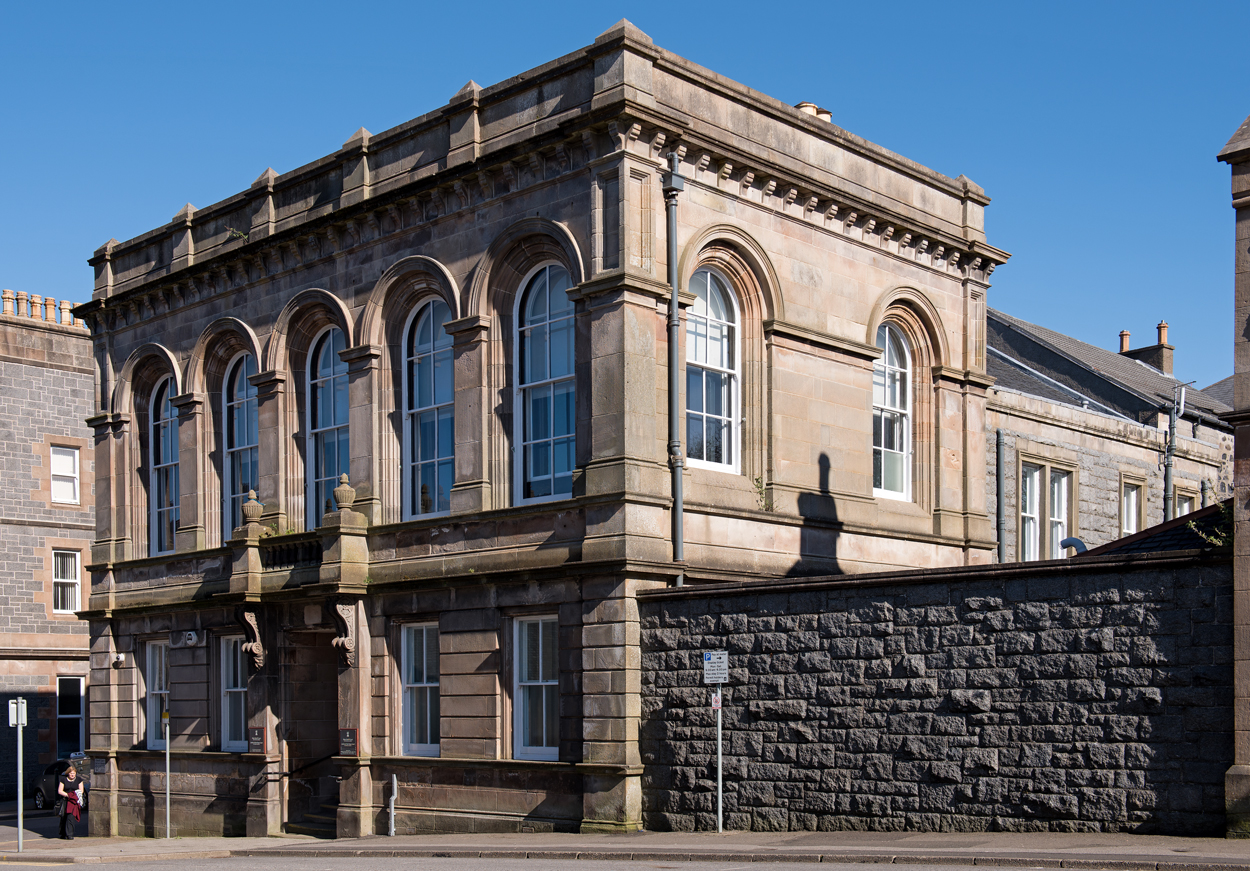
- The building in 2016

- Shown in Argyll and Bute
- 56.4113°N 5.4734°W
- Location: Albany Street, Oban

History
- Built: 1889

Site notes
- Architect: David MacKintosh
- Architectural style: Italianate style

Listed Building – Category B
- Official name: Oban Sheriff Court and Justice Of The Peace Court, Albany Street, Oban
- Designated: 12 October 1995
- Reference no.: LB38801

Oban Sheriff Court is a judicial building on Albany Street in Oban in Scotland. The building, which remains in use as a courthouse, is a Category B listed building.

== History ==
The current building was intended to replace an earlier courthouse and prison in Argyll Square, which had been designed by David Rhind and completed in 1856. In the 1880s the Argyll Commissioners of Supply decided to procure a more substantial courthouse for the county. The site they selected was on the southeast side of Albany Street.

The building was designed by David MacKintosh in the Italianate style, built in ashlar stone and was completed in 1889. The design involved a symmetrical main frontage of five bays facing onto Albany Street. The central bay featured a square-headed doorway flanked by pilasters and brackets supporting a balcony with urns and a balustraded front. The other bays on the ground floor, which was rusticated, were fenestrated by square headed sash windows, while the bays on the first floor were fenestrated by round-headed windows with archivolts. The first floor windows were separated by pilasters with imposts supporting the archivolts. At roof level there was a modillioned cornice and a parapet. Internally, the principal area was the main courtroom on the first floor extending right across the main frontage. The courtroom featured finely carved palmettes on the wooden bench, the jury box and the dock.

Notable cases which appeared in front of the court included the trial and conviction of the Scotland international rugby union player, John MacCallum, who was a conscientious objector during the First World War. He was fined £2 for being absent without leave. In March 1953, the court was the venue for the inquest into the deaths of two crew members from the Islay lifeboat, who died from carbon monoxide poisoning during an attempt to save the lives of 15 fishermen on the fishing trawler Michael Griffiths. The whole crew of the Michael Griffiths were also died.

The building was refurbished in 1990 but in such a way that its original internal finishings were largely retained. More recently, the building was the venue for the claim by a retired lawyer, Ian Hamilton, against Royal Bank of Scotland for failure to disclose its true financial position prior to is collapse in 2008. Hamilton abandoned the case when the sheriff ruled that the case was too complex to proceed without going before a higher court.

== See also ==
- List of listed buildings in Oban
