= Duncan MacGregor Whyte =

Scottish artist (1866–1953)

- Born: 3 May 1866; Oban, Argyll, Scotland
- Died: 3 December 1953 (aged 87); Oban, Argyll, Scotland
- Education: Académie Delécluse
- Occupation: Painter
- Spouse: Mary Baylis Barnard

Duncan MacGregor Whyte (3 May 1866 – 3 December 1953) was an early-mid 20th century Scottish painter specialising in portrait, landscape, and seascape painting.

== Early life ==
Duncan MacGregor Whyte was born in Oban, Argyll in 1866, to Rev. Charles Whyte the Congregational Minister of Oban and Eliza Whyte (née Farquharson), the daughter of Archibald Farquharson, the Congregational Minister of Tiree.

== Artist ==
After schooling in Oban, he began his art studies in Glasgow. He continued his studies on the continent, firstly in Antwerp, Belgium under Van Havermaet and later at the Académie Delécluse, Paris under Delécluse, Caillot and Delance.

It was at the Académie Delécluse that he met his wife, the artist Mary Baylis Barnard.

On his return to Scotland, he built a reputation as a portrait artist.

Between 1911 and 1921 he travelled to Canada and Australia, working on portrait commissions. Among the most notable being those of Captain H. V. Throssell V.C and Dr. C.O.L. Riley, the Archbishop of Perth, both of which now are included in the State Art Collection of the Art Gallery of Western Australia.

During his stay in Australia, he became involved with the West Australian Society of Arts, acting as President from 1920 to 1921. Returning to Scotland in 1921, he made his base at Bealachan Ruighe in Oban and spent summers on Tiree. In the early 1900s he had built a Studio on the island, at Ceann na Creige in Balephuill.

In addition to portraits, Whyte produced landscapes and seascapes, often portraying daily life in Canada, Australia and Tiree. He exhibited at the Royal Scottish Academy (13), The Royal Society of Artists in Watercolours (2), the Royal Glasgow Institute (50+), the Walker Art Gallery in Liverpool (4).

His painting “The Last Rays of Day” won the James Torrance Memorial Prize in 1947 at the Royal Glasgow Institute. His work is represented in the collections of a number of galleries, including the Kelvingrove Art Gallery and Museum and the State Art Collection of the Art Gallery of Western Australia.

== Other activities ==
A native speaker of Gaelic, Whyte was an ardent supporter of the Gaelic language and adjudicated at many Mòds. For a number of years he was president of the Ceilidh nan Gaidheal, Glasgow.

== Death ==
He died aged 86, in Oban, on December 3, 1953.

== Known works ==
Dugald McIsaac, Provost of Oban (1905–1908), Oban Municipal Buildings

Hugh MacGowan, Provost of Oban (1866–1953), Oban Municipal Buildings

The Artist's Son Bunty, The Shinty Boy, The Corran Halls, Oban

Stalla Hunisgeir, Glasgow Museums Resource Centre (GMRC)

Professor Thorpe Davie, The Stirling Smith Art Gallery & Museum

Malcolm Macleod, Museum nan Eilean

Cottars on 'The Land', University of Edinburgh

Harvesting Potatoes, Red Tam, University of Edinburgh

The Last Rays of Day, Library Headquarters, Dunoon

The beach at Perth, The Art Gallery of Western Australia
