= Caig =

Caig may refer to:

== People ==
- John Caig, designer of Blaze (dinghy)
- Dave Caig, founder of Accuracy International
- Tony Caig (born 1974), English football goalkeeper

== Other ==
- CAIG Sky Wing
- CAIG Wing Loong
- CAIG Wing Loong II

== See also ==
- McCaig
