= List of listed buildings in Oban =

This is a list of listed buildings in the parish of Oban in Argyll and Bute, Scotland.

== List ==
Name	Location	Date Listed	Grid Ref. (Note: Sometimes known as OSGB36, the grid reference (where provided) is based on the British national grid reference system used by the Ordnance Survey. • "Guide to National Grid". Ordnance Survey. • "Get-a-map". Ordnance Survey.)	Geo-coordinates	Notes	LB Number (Note: Historic Environment Scotland assign a unique alphanumeric identifier to each designated site in Scotland, for listed buildings this always begins with "LB", for example "LB12345".)	Image
Albany Street, Sheriff Court-House				56°24′41″N 5°28′25″W	Category B	38801	Upload another image
6-14 (Even Nos) Alma Crescent				56°24′36″N 5°28′41″W	Category C(S)	38802	Upload Photo
Argyll Square, St Columba's Church And Hall With Gatepiers (Formerly United Free Church)				56°24′42″N 5°28′25″W	Category C(S)	38813	Upload another image
Corran Esplanade, Great Western Hotel				56°25′04″N 5°28′27″W	Category B	38822	Upload Photo
Corran Esplanade, Kilchrenan And Glencairn Hotels				56°25′13″N 5°28′50″W	Category C(S)	38823	Upload Photo
Corran Esplanade, Queens Hotel				56°25′15″N 5°28′53″W	Category C(S)	38825	Upload Photo
Corran Esplanade, Wellpark And Glenrigh Hotels				56°25′15″N 5°28′52″W	Category B	38828	Upload Photo
Corran Esplanade, Westbay Hotel				56°25′04″N 5°28′29″W	Category C(S)	38829	Upload Photo
15-17 (Odd Nos) George Street, And 2-3 Queen's Park Place, Single Storey Shops				56°24′47″N 5°28′20″W	Category C(S)	38838	Upload Photo
18 George Street, Palace Hotel				56°24′49″N 5°28′19″W	Category C(S)	38840	Upload Photo
70 George Street, And Stafford Street				56°24′54″N 5°28′21″W	Category B	38844	Upload Photo
102-112 (Even Nos) George Street				56°24′57″N 5°28′22″W	Category C(S)	38846	Upload Photo
Queen's Park Place, (Caledonian Hotel)				56°24′46″N 5°28′20″W	Category B	38856	Upload Photo
17 And 19 Argyll Square				56°24′42″N 5°28′20″W	Category C(S)	38806	Upload Photo
10-12 (Inclusive Nos) Argyll Square				56°24′43″N 5°28′17″W	Category C(S)	38810	Upload Photo
20-22 (Even Nos) Argyll Square				56°24′42″N 5°28′21″W	Category B	38811	Upload Photo
Corran Esplanade And 1 Stafford Street, Oban Inn				56°24′54″N 5°28′25″W	Category B	38827	Upload another image See more images
28 George Street, King's Arms Flats (Formerly Hotel)				56°24′49″N 5°28′20″W	Category B	38842	Upload Photo
94-100 (Even Nos) George Street, And Craigard Road, Balmoral Hotel				56°24′57″N 5°28′22″W	Category C(S)	38845	Upload Photo
122-132 (Even Nos) George Street				56°24′59″N 5°28′23″W	Category C(S)	38848	Upload Photo
George Street And Queen's Park Place, Harbour Walls				56°24′49″N 5°28′21″W	Category C(S)	38850	Upload another image
Rockfield Road, Oban Free High Church (Free Church)				56°24′44″N 5°28′11″W	Category B	38857	Upload another image
Rockfield Road, Primary School With Boundary Walls And Play-Shelter				56°24′47″N 5°28′12″W	Category B	38858	Upload Photo
29 Albany Street, Including Police Station				56°24′40″N 5°28′28″W	Category C(S)	38798	Upload Photo
Gallanach Road, The Manorhouse (Hotel) With Lamp Standards, Ice House And Boundary Walls				56°24′40″N 5°28′58″W	Category B	38835	Upload Photo
8-16 (Even Nos) George Street, (Formerly Queen's Hotel)				56°24′48″N 5°28′19″W	Category B	38839	Upload Photo
Hill Street, The Mains With Boundary Wall				56°24′46″N 5°28′10″W	Category B	38852	Upload Photo
1 Shore Street, Claredon Hotel				56°24′43″N 5°28′24″W	Category C(S)	38859	Upload Photo
23 And 25 Argyll Square, And 1-6 Albany Street				56°24′42″N 5°28′22″W	Category C(S)	38807	Upload Photo
2 Argyll Square And Airds Place, Royal Hotel				56°24′44″N 5°28′18″W	Category B	38808	Upload Photo
Corran Esplanade, Cathedral Church Of St Columba, With Boundary Walls (Roman Catholic)				56°25′10″N 5°28′44″W	Category A	38820	Upload another image See more images
Corran Esplanade, Oban Times Building				56°24′57″N 5°28′25″W	Category B	38824	Upload another image
Gallanach Road, Dungallan Parks Public Conveniences And Shelter Walls, Steps Balustrades And Lamp Standards				56°24′38″N 5°29′09″W	Category C(S)	38836	Upload Photo
120 George Street				56°24′59″N 5°28′23″W	Category B	38847	Upload Photo
Nursery Lane And Hamilton Park Terrace				56°25′03″N 5°28′22″W	Category C(S)	38855	Upload Photo
Stafford Street, Oban Distillery				56°24′54″N 5°28′18″W	Category B	38864	Upload Photo
19 Stevenson Street, Lindhu House (Former Hall) With Gatepier And Railing				56°24′46″N 5°28′14″W	Category C(S)	38868	Upload Photo
Tweeddale Street, Congregational Church				56°24′52″N 5°28′15″W	Category B	38869	Upload Photo
8 And 9 Argyll Square				56°24′43″N 5°28′17″W	Category C(S)	38804	Upload Photo
13 Argyll Square, And Lamp Standard				56°24′42″N 5°28′17″W	Category B	38805	Upload Photo
Charles Street				56°24′55″N 5°28′24″W	Category B	38816	Upload Photo
Corran Esplanade, Alexandra Place				56°24′57″N 5°28′26″W	Category C(S)	38818	Upload Photo
Corran Esplanade, Regent Hotel (Formerly Marine Hotel)				56°24′56″N 5°28′25″W	Category B	38826	Upload another image
20-26 (Even Nos) George Street, Royal Bank Of Scotland				56°24′49″N 5°28′19″W	Category B	38841	Upload Photo
33 High Street, (Former School Of Industry)				56°24′39″N 5°28′21″W	Category C(S)	38851	Upload Photo
North Pier, Piermaster's Offices, With Lamp Standards				56°24′53″N 5°28′29″W	Category C(S)	38854	Upload Photo
Gallanach Road, Lighthouse Depot Including Gatepiers, Manager's House With Outbuildings To E And Boundary Walls				56°24′40″N 5°28′55″W	Category C(S)	49357	Upload Photo
4-6 (Even Nos) Argyll Square, Royal Bank Of Scotland (Former County Buildings)				56°24′43″N 5°28′18″W	Category B	38809	Upload Photo
Battery Hill, Mccaig Monument				56°24′56″N 5°28′09″W	Category B	38814	Upload another image
Gallanach Road, Dungallan Hotel With Terrace Walls				56°24′36″N 5°29′09″W	Category C(S)	38832	Upload Photo
Gallanach Road, Kilbowie Lodge				56°24′15″N 5°30′01″W	Category B	38833	Upload Photo
George Street, Cathedral Of St John The Divine (Episcopal) With Railings				56°25′00″N 5°28′25″W	Category C(S)	38849	Upload another image
1-7 (Inclusive Nos) Shore Street, Cawdor Place Including The Kelvin Hotel				56°24′40″N 5°28′32″W	Category B	38860	Upload Photo
15-19 (Odd Nos) Stafford And George Street				56°24′54″N 5°28′23″W	Category C(S)	38863	Upload Photo
1-4 (Inclusive Nos) Victoria Crescent				56°25′06″N 5°28′29″W	Category C(S)	38872	Upload Photo
Croft Road, First Steps Nursery (Former St John's School), Including Playsheds, Boundary Walls And Gatepiers				56°25′16″N 5°28′08″W	Category C(S)	49139	Upload Photo
Albany Street, Municipal Buildings, With Lamp Standards				56°24′42″N 5°28′26″W	Category B	38799	Upload another image
Albany Street, Post Office				56°24′40″N 5°28′29″W	Category B	38800	Upload Photo
Ardconnel Road, Craigvarren House				56°24′53″N 5°28′12″W	Category B	38803	Upload Photo
Argyll Square, Former Clydesdale Bank				56°24′44″N 5°28′23″W	Category C(S)	38812	Upload Photo
Benvoulin Road, Manderley				56°25′08″N 5°28′06″W	Category B	38815	Upload Photo
Corran Esplanade, Argyll Hotel				56°24′55″N 5°28′25″W	Category C(S)	38819	Upload Photo
Drummore Road, Eadar Glinn				56°24′09″N 5°28′15″W	Category C(S)	38831	Upload Photo
42-46 (Even Nos) George Street And 3 Argyll Street, Argyll Mansions				56°24′52″N 5°28′20″W	Category B	38843	Upload another image
North Pier And Corran Esplanade, Columba Hotel				56°24′53″N 5°28′26″W	Category B	38853	Upload another image
5-11 (Odd Nos) Stevenson Street				56°24′47″N 5°28′18″W	Category C(S)	38866	Upload Photo
37 And 39 (Odd Nos) Stevenson Street, With Lamp Standard				56°24′44″N 5°28′14″W	Category C(S)	38867	Upload Photo
7 To 9 (Inclusive Nos) Albany Street, Masonic Hall				56°24′42″N 5°28′23″W	Category B	38797	Upload Photo
Combie Street, Oban Old Parish Church With Wall, Gates And Piers (Church Of Scotland)				56°24′36″N 5°28′10″W	Category C(S)	38817	Upload Photo
Corran Esplanade, Christ Church Dunollie (Church Of Scotland)				56°25′09″N 5°28′37″W	Category B	38821	Upload another image
Dalriach Road, Maternity Hospital (Formerly Gleneuchar House)				56°24′59″N 5°28′17″W	Category B	38830	Upload Photo
Gallanach Road, Kilbowie Lodge Stables				56°24′15″N 5°29′56″W	Category C(S)	38834	Upload Photo
South Pier, Piermaster's House				56°24′40″N 5°28′47″W	Category B	38862	Upload Photo
Station Road, Bank Of Scotland				56°24′45″N 5°28′22″W	Category B	38865	Upload Photo
3 Tweeddale Street, Woodside Hotel				56°24′49″N 5°28′16″W	Category B	38870	Upload Photo
9 Tweeddale Street				56°24′49″N 5°28′16″W	Category C(S)	38871	Upload Photo
Breadalbane Street, The Argyllshire Gathering Halls And The Gathering Restaurant				56°25′06″N 5°28′23″W	Category C(S)	47127	Upload Photo

== Key ==
The scheme for classifying buildings in Scotland is:

- Category A: "buildings of national or international importance, either architectural or historic; or fine, little-altered examples of some particular period, style or building type."
- Category B: "buildings of regional or more than local importance; or major examples of some particular period, style or building type, which may have been altered."
- Category C: "buildings of local importance; lesser examples of any period, style, or building type, as originally constructed or moderately altered; and simple traditional buildings which group well with other listed buildings."

In March 2016 there were 47,288 listed buildings in Scotland. Of these, 8% were Category A, and 50% were Category B, with the remaining 42% being Category C.

== See also ==
- List of listed buildings in Argyll and Bute
