= McCaig =

McCaig is a surname. Notable people with the surname include:

- Bud McCaig (1929–2005), Canadian businessman
- Dave McCaig (born 1971), Canadian cartoonist and colorist
- David McCaig (born 1956), Scottish footballer
- Donald McCaig (1940–2018), American writer
- Doug McCaig (1919–1982), Canadian ice hockey player
- John Stuart McCaig (1823–1902), Scottish architect
- Iain McCaig (born 1957), Canadian illustrator

== See also ==
- McCaig's Tower, Folly building in Scotland, United Kingdom
- Norman MacCaig (1910–1996), Scottish Poet (Father's surname spelled McCaig)
