= Mary Baylis Barnard =

English painter

- Born: 1870; Holt, Wiltshire, England
- Died: 1946 (aged 75–76); Oban, Argyll, Scotland
- Occupation: Painter
- Spouse: Duncan MacGregor Whyte

Marjorie Baylis Barnard, known as Mary Baylis Barnard, (1870–1946) was a versatile British painter, notably of flowers but also of landscapes, interiors and genre scenes.

== Biography ==
Barnard was born in Wiltshire and studied art in Paris. She lived in London until 1900 when she moved to Glasgow and in 1901 she married the artist Duncan MacGregor Whyte, who she had met in Paris. In 1910 they moved to Oban where they shared a studio. The couple also spent part of each year on the island of Tiree, where they also kept a studio.

Barnard was regarded as a highly competent painter with a fine colour sense which was best expressed in her delicate floral paintings. Although she sometimes exhibited works in London, for example showing flower paintings at the Royal Academy in 1894 and 1899 and also at the Royal Institute of Oil Painters, the majority of Barnard's public career took place in Scotland. She exhibited at the Royal Scottish Academy and, more frequently, with the Royal Glasgow Institute of the Fine Arts.
