= Hope MacDougall =

Irish historian, photographer and collector

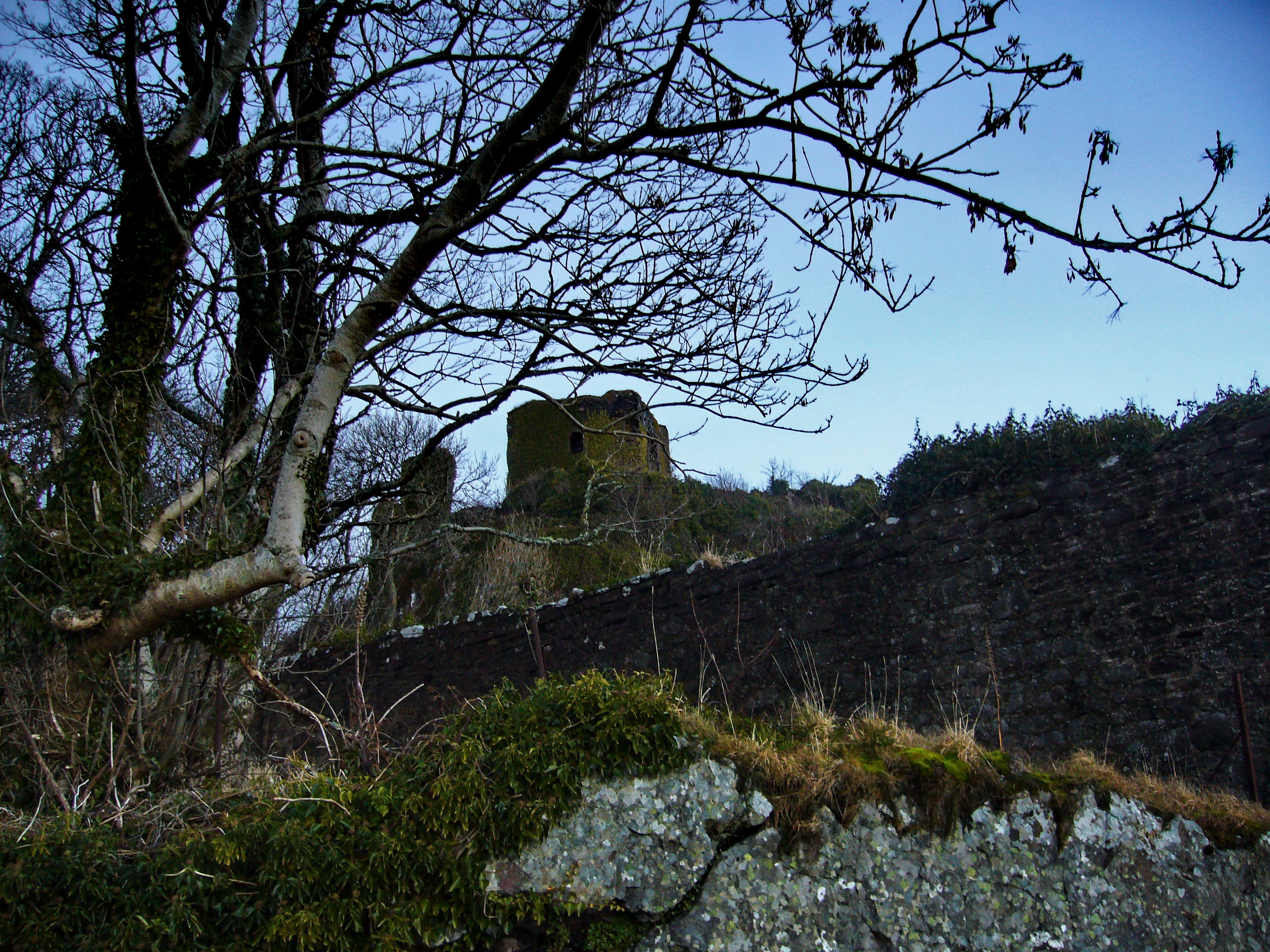
- Dunollie Museum, Castle & Grounds
- Born: 21 January 1918; Athlone, Ireland
- Died: 22 December 1998 (aged 80); Oban, Scotland
- Other names: Margaret Hope Garnons MacDougall
- Years active: 1950-1998
- Known for: Hope MacDougall Collection, Clan MacDougall.

Margaret Hope Garnons MacDougall (Athlone, 21 January 1913 - Oban, 22 December 1998) was an Irish historian, photographer and collector; the youngest daughter of Colina MacDougall and Alexander James MacDougall, chief of the Clan MacDougall at Dunollie. She was aunt to three successive chiefs of the Clan MacDougall, who curated an expansive family collection of notable historical artefacts and records with her sisters, Jena and Coline.

Transforming her spacious residence into a museum in Ganavan, near Oban, she curated an assortment of objects that showcased endangered skills and crafts. After she died in 1998 the collection went to Dunollie where a curated selection of artefacts is exhibited in the 1745 house museum and others are kept in the archive.

== Hope MacDougall Collection ==
In the latter part of the 20th century, Hope embarked on a mission to document and preserve the way of life in Argyllshire, the Western Isles, and the Highlands. Her collection efforts commenced in the 1950s, accumulating thousands of items before her death. She focused on capturing the everyday working and domestic experiences of the people in Scotland.

Hope's extensive collection encompasses diverse traditional crafts, skills, and professions. These include but are not limited to agricultural practices, early distilling, beekeeping, dairying, shoe making, travellers' camps, laundry, knitting, and more.

Her collection is nowadays exhibited in the Dunollie Castle museum and grounds run by the MacDougall of Dunollie Preservation Trust.

== The Dunollie Preservation Trust (DPT) ==
The Dunollie Preservation Trust, established in 1998 by Morag MacDougall. Nowadays, the DPT is responsible for the preservation of numerous listed buildings and monuments, such as Dunollie Castle in Oban, Gylen Castle on Kerrera, and the 1745 House Museum. Additionally, the trust oversees the maintenance of nationally significant archives and a collection comprising over 10,000 objects.
