= John Stuart McCaig =

Scottish banker and philanthropist (1823–1902)

John Stuart McCaig (sometimes styled as John Stuart McCaig of Muckairn and Soroba) was the second son of Malcom ^{[sic]} McCaig (a farmer) and Margaret Stewart and was born at Clachan, Isle of Lismore, Argyll, Scotland on 11 July 1823 and baptised at St Moluag's Cathedral, Lismore.

He died aged 78 from Angina Pectoris, on 29 June 1902 at John Square House, Oban, Argyll.

He is principally known for commissioning McCaig's Tower in Oban for which he was also the architect. He had extensive dealings within the Oban surroundings including being the Gas Works Director and owning the Pier.

From the hustings for the 1885 Election.

ARGYLLSHIRE. Mr John Stewart McCaig, one of the candidates for the representation of the county, addressed a crowded meeting of the electors in the Argyll Hall, Tarbert, on Monday afternoon. Mr John McLeod, ironmonger, was moved to the chair. Mr McCaig was very cordially received. After speaking of the extent and importance of the county, and saying that it was entitled to two members more, Mr McCaig said that he had been all his life a strong supporter of the historical Liberal and progressive party, to which the nation was indebted for such beneficial measures as Free-trade, the repeal of the Corn-laws, and of the important measures on the heals of which the trade and commerce of the nation made such gigantic strides. He considered the Commission at present sitting on the depression of trade a delusion and a snare, by which the Tories tried to secure the votes of the new electorate. He afterwards referred at great length to the land question. He maintained that the Irish Land Act was the most liberal Land Act in Europe at the present day. He would advocate a complete reformation of the land laws, and would abolish the laws of primogeniture and entail. Future settlement should be prohibited, and no landowner should be allowed to bond his property, so that the sale of land could be made easier and cheaper. He was in favour of fixity of tenure with improving covenants and compensation for improvements, and also of the appointment of arbiters for the fixing of fair rents for small holdings. The crofters should have power to sell the right of tenancy, with a pre-emption in favour of the landlord if he chose to exercise it. He would like farmers to have greater freedom of cultivation, the only condition being that they did not impoverish the land. He would favour the passing of a Land Purchase Bill, by which Government would advance money to tenants and crofters to enable them to become the owners of the soil they tilled. He was in favour of elective county boards, with powers to improve harbours and to look after the sanitary condition of villages and rural districts. He advocated a free breakfast table, the deficiency in the revenue to be made up by an increase of the Income tax. He would also support a bill for free education. In referring to fishing matters, he stated that he would support a measure for a weekly close time, and would give fishermen liberty to catch salmon in the open sea, the mouth of rivers excepted. In answer to questions, he said he was in favour of all convents being swept out of the county, but he was opposed to the disestablishment of the Church of Scotland. A vote of confidence in Mr McCaig was passed unanimously. Mr McCaig spoke partly in Gaelic and partly in English, and was frequently cheered. In the evening he addressed another large meeting in the Good Templars’ Hall.

== See also ==
- McCaig's Tower
- Argyllshire (UK Parliament constituency)
- List of British architects
