= Oban Municipal Buildings =

Judicial building in Oban, Scotland

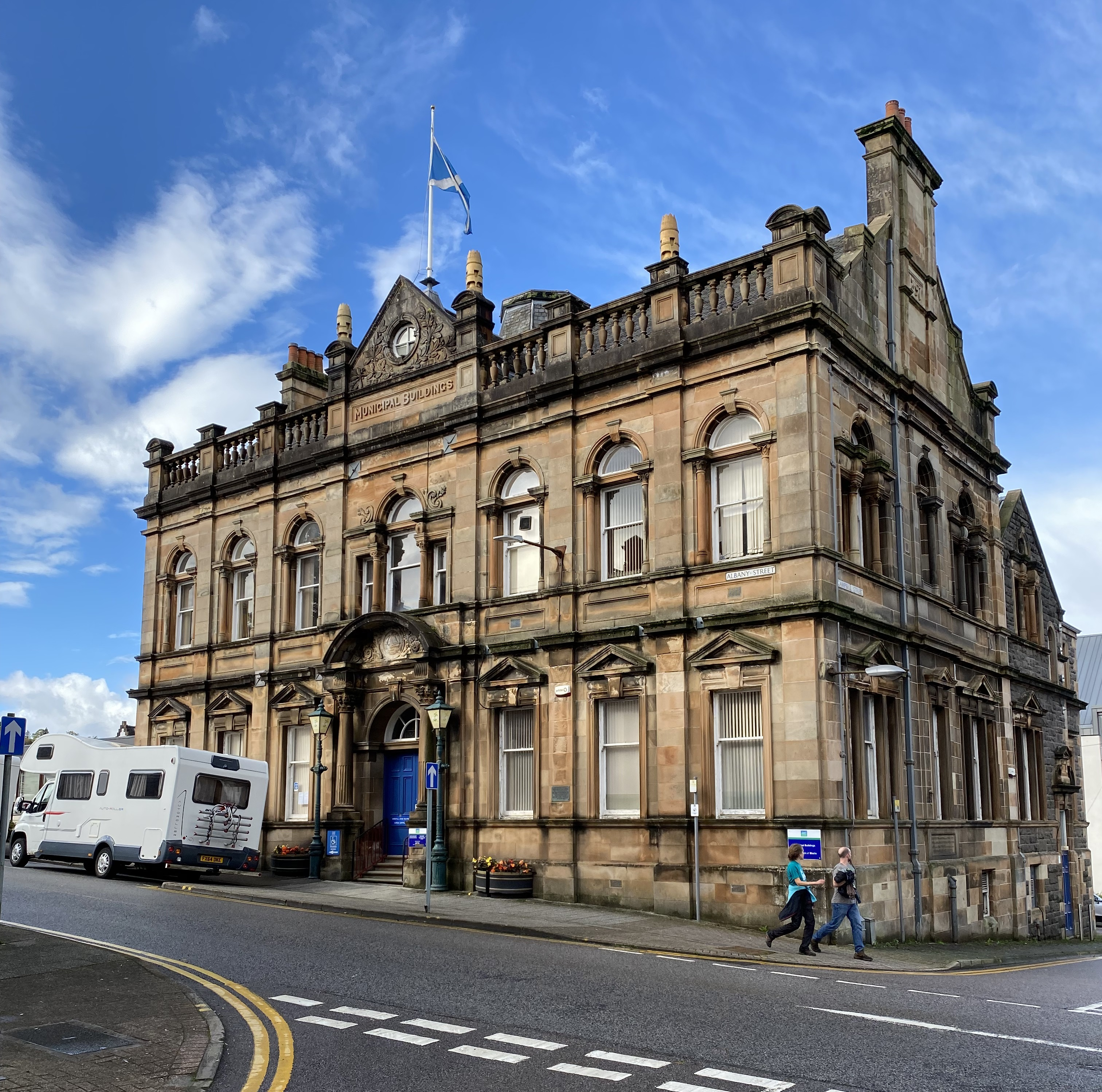
- The building in 2021

- Shown in Argyll and Bute
- 56.4115°N 5.4738°W
- Location: Albany Street, Oban

History
- Built: c.1900

Site notes
- Architect: Alexander Shairp
- Architectural style: Neoclassical style

Listed Building – Category B
- Official name: Albany Street, Municipal Buildings, with lamp standards
- Designated: 16 May 1995
- Reference no.: LB38799

Oban Municipal Buildings is a municipal building on Albany Street in Oban in Scotland. The building, which is used by Argyll and Bute Council for the delivery of local services, is a Category B listed building.

== History ==
Following significant population growth, largely associated with the fishing and distillery industries, Oban became a police burgh in 1862. However, Oban did not have a town house, until the police commissioners decided to procure one to commemorate the Diamond Jubilee of Queen Victoria. The site they selected was on the northwest side of Albany Street.

The foundation stone for the new building was laid by the provost, Francis Cooper, on 22 June 1897. It was designed by Alexander Shairp in the neoclassical style, built in ashlar stone at a cost of £6,000 and was completed in around 1900. The design involved a symmetrical main frontage of seven bays facing onto Albany Street. The central bay featured a round headed opening with an archivolt and a keystone flanked a pair of Corinthian order columns supporting an open segmental pediment with floral carvings in the tympanum: there was a venetian window on the first floor. The other bays were fenestrated by sash windows with keystones and triangular pediments on the ground floor, and by round headed windows with colonettes and keystones on the first floor. The bays were separated by full height pilasters supporting a frieze and a balustraded parapet. The parapet was broken by a panel, inscribed with the words "Municipal Buildings", which was surmounted by a triangular pediment containing an oculus and flanked by pedestals supporting finials. Internally, the principal room was the council chamber in the northeast corner of the first floor.

In August 1956, Queen Elizabeth II visited the town and, following her visit, a plaque was placed on the main frontage, to the right of the entrance, to celebrate the royal visit. In October 1962, another plaque was placed on the main frontage, to the left of the entrance, to celebrate the founding of An Comunn Gàidhealach (English: The Gaelic Association) in Oban in 1891. The building continued to serve as the meeting place of the burgh council for much of the 20th century but ceased to be the local seat of government when the enlarged Argyll and Bute District Council was formed in 1975. However, the council, known as Argyll and Bute Council after it became a unitary authority in 1996, subsequently established a customer service point in the building as well as a series of "touchdown areas" for local residents.

Works of art in the building included a pair of portraits by Duncan MacGregor Whyte depicting the provosts, Dugald McIsaac and Hugh MacGowan.

== See also ==
- List of listed buildings in Oban
