= Ganavan =

Settlement in Argyll and Bute, Scotland

Coordinates: 56.434°N 5.471°W

Ganavan: Scottish Gaelic: A' Ghaineamh Bhàn
- Location within Argyll and Bute
- OS grid reference: NM860323
- Council area: Argyll and Bute
- Lieutenancy area: Argyll and Bute
- Country: Scotland
- Sovereign state: United Kingdom
- Post town: OBAN
- Postcode district: PA34
- Police: Scotland
- Fire: Scottish
- Ambulance: Scottish
- UK Parliament: Argyll, Bute and South Lochaber
- Scottish Parliament: Argyll and Bute

Ganavan (Scottish Gaelic: A' Ghaineamh Bhàn) is a small settlement on Ganavan Bay on the west coast of Scotland, around 1.5 miles (2.4 km) north of the town of Oban.
