= McCaig's Tower =

Folly in Argyll and Bute, Scotland

Coordinates: 56.4156°N 5.4691°W

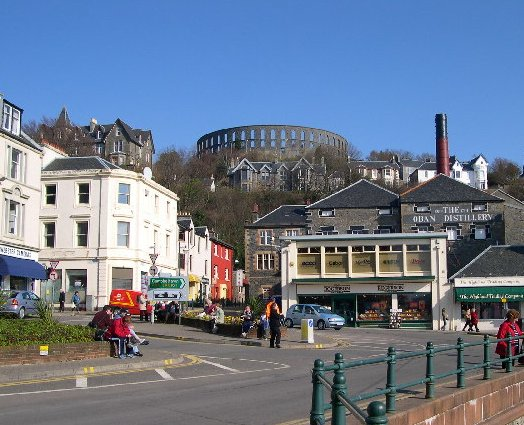
McCaig's Tower.

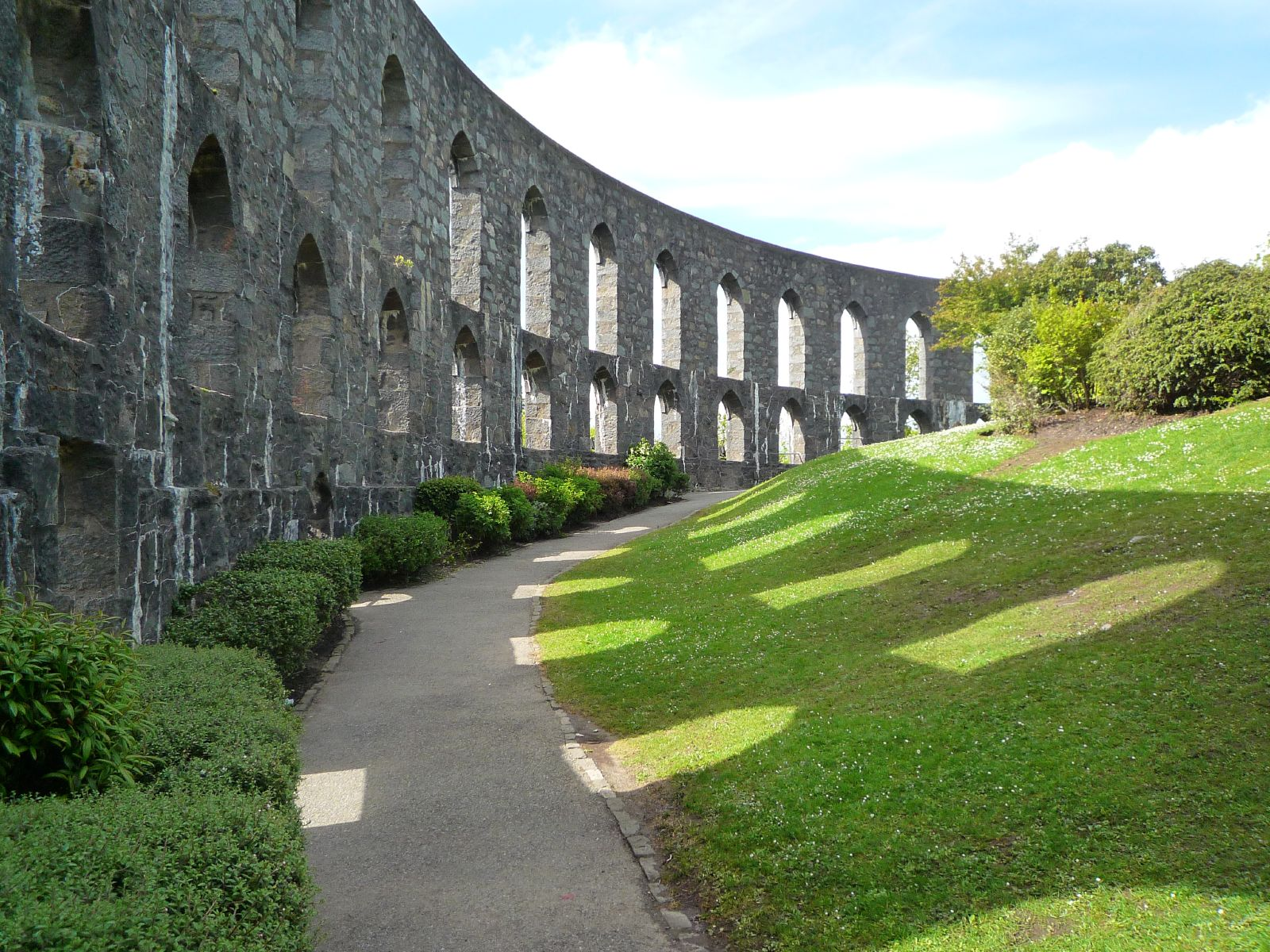
Interior of the shell of McCaig's Tower.

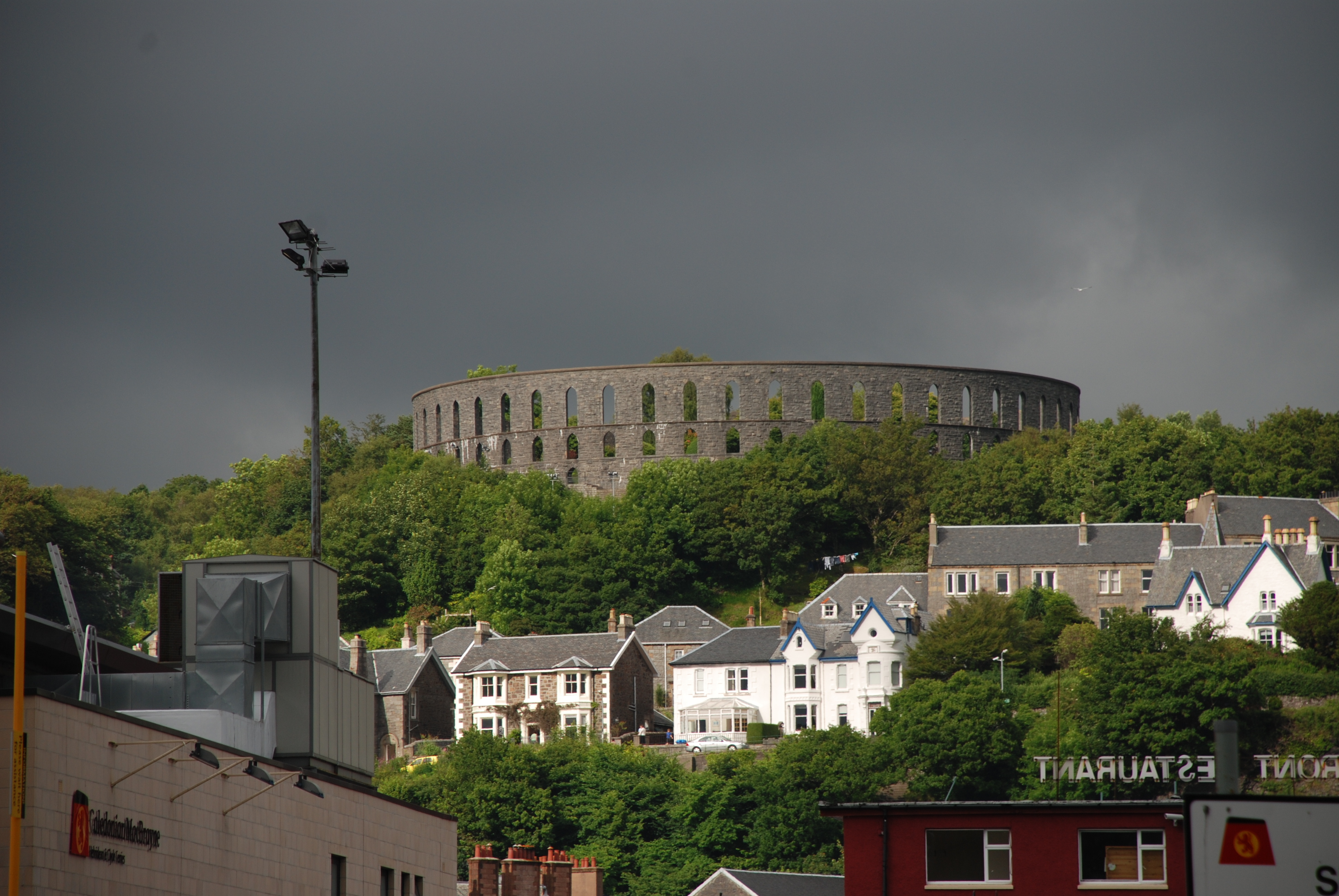
McCaig's Tower from the ferry to Isle of Mull.

McCaig's Tower or McCaig's Folly is a prominent tower on Battery Hill overlooking the town of Oban in Argyll, Scotland. It is built of Bonawe granite taken from the quarries across Airds Bay, on Loch Etive, from Muckairn, with a circumference of about 200 metres (660 ft) with two tiers of lancet arches, 94 in total (44 on the bottom and 50 on top). It is a Grade B Listed historic monument.

The structure was commissioned, at a cost of £5,000 sterling (equivalent to £700,000 in 2024), by the wealthy, philanthropic banker (North of Scotland Bank), John Stuart McCaig.

John Stuart McCaig was his own architect. The tower was erected between 1897 and his death, aged 78 from cardiac arrest, on 29 June 1902 at John Square House in Oban.

McCaig's intention was to provide a lasting monument to his family, and provide work for the local stonemasons during the winter months. McCaig was an admirer of Roman and Greek architecture, and had planned for an elaborate structure, based on the Colosseum in Rome. His plans allowed for a museum and art gallery with a central tower to be incorporated. Inside the central tower he planned to commission statues of himself, his siblings and their parents. His death brought an end to construction, with only the outer walls completed. Although his will included £1,000 per year for maintenance, the will was disputed by his heirs; their appeal to the court was successful.

== Legacy ==
The structure has been a Category B Listed historic monument since 1971. The listing summary offers this information:

There was to be a central tower and statues in the arched openings. Dean of Guild Court retains drawings of a "stone and lime wall and granite tower, with freestone dressings" dated 1895, and of "stone and lime wall as an addition to the wall at present being erected" dated 1896, and a further addition to the height of the wall by 15 feet [4.5 m] in 1897.

The empty shell of the tower dominates the Oban skyline, and is now a public garden with views to the islands of Kerrera, Lismore and Mull. It is reached via the 144 steps of Jacob's Ladder.

The first wedding ceremony conducted at McCaig's Tower took place on May 26th 1992. Keith Hirsch, originally from Dundee, Scotland, and living in Canada since 1967, married Dora Fuchihara from Toronto, Canada. The wedding was chronicled on the front page of the Oban Times that same week.

Also reported in the Oban Times drinking of alcohol is prohibited in the tower under local by-laws.

== Litigation ==
Between 1907 and 1915, McCaig tower found itself at the center of 2 cases.

=== McCaig v The University of Glasgow ===
The first case, McCaig v the University of Glasgow in 1907 pertained to the testament of John McCaig, which stipulated that the revenue from his heritable estate, by means of a trust, be used to erect statues of himself, and his siblings within McCaig tower and ensure its maintenance, in addition to this, it provided for the construction of "Artistic Towers" in Oban. Young artists were to submit plans for these towers with the best to receive prizes. The Court of Session held that the trust did not confer a beneficial interest on any person, or group of persons. In addition to this, an heir was disinherited, and the law at the time required a new beneficiary to disinherit. In addition to this, the trust was held to be "contrary to public policy", in that the revenue of the heritable estate in its entirety was perpetually tied to the maintenance of:

"objects of no utility, private or public, objects which benefit nobody, and which have no other purpose or use than that of perpetuating at great cost, and in an absurd manner, the idiosyncrasies of an eccentric testator."

Thus, the trust was declared invalid.

=== McCaig's Trustees v Kirk-Session of United Free Church of Lismore ===
The second case, McCaig's Trustees v Kirk-Session of United Free Church of Lismore in 1915 was a case dealing with Catherine McCaig (Sister of John McCaig), who by codicil directed her testamentary trustees to convert McCaig tower into a private, non-publicly accessible enclosure. This was to house statues of her parents, and 9 children, each costing at least £1,000. These, and the tower were to be maintained for all time coming. Once again, the Court of Session found that:

"if a bequest such as that in Miss McCaig's codicil were held good, money would require to be expended in perpetuity merely to gratify an absurd whim which has neither reason nor public sentiment in its favour."

Once more, the directions in the codicil were held to be invalid, as they were contrary to public policy.
