= Oban =

Town in Argyll and Bute, Scotland

Coordinates: 56.412°N 5.472°W

Oban: Scottish Gaelic: An t-Òban
- Town and former burgh of barony
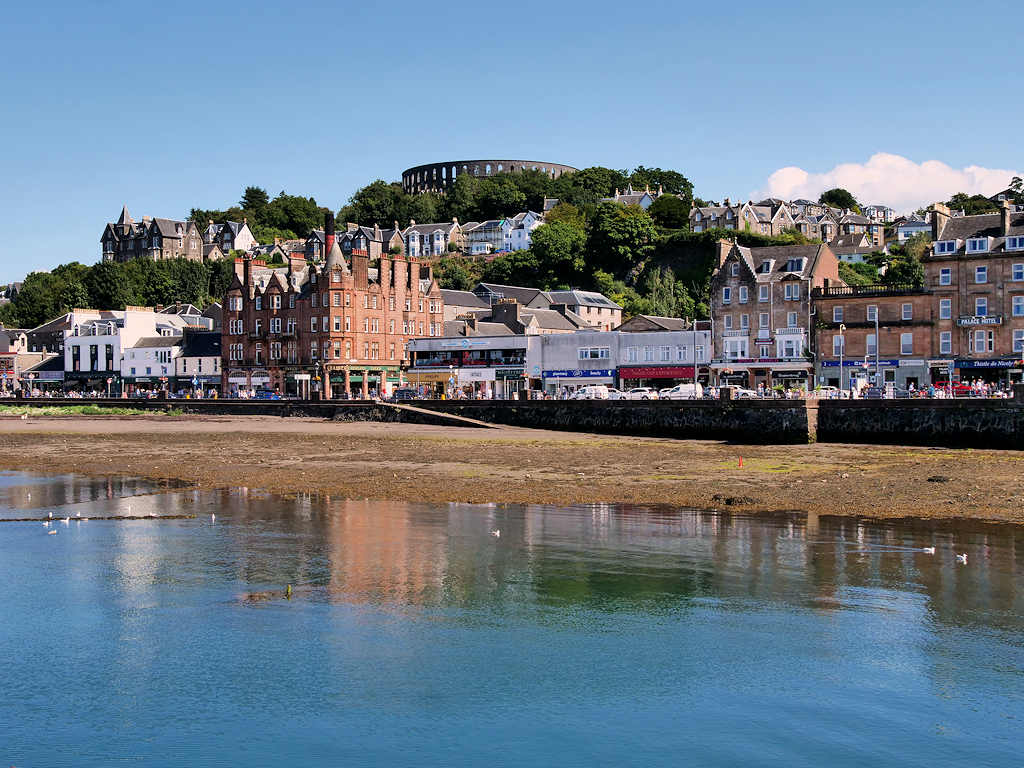
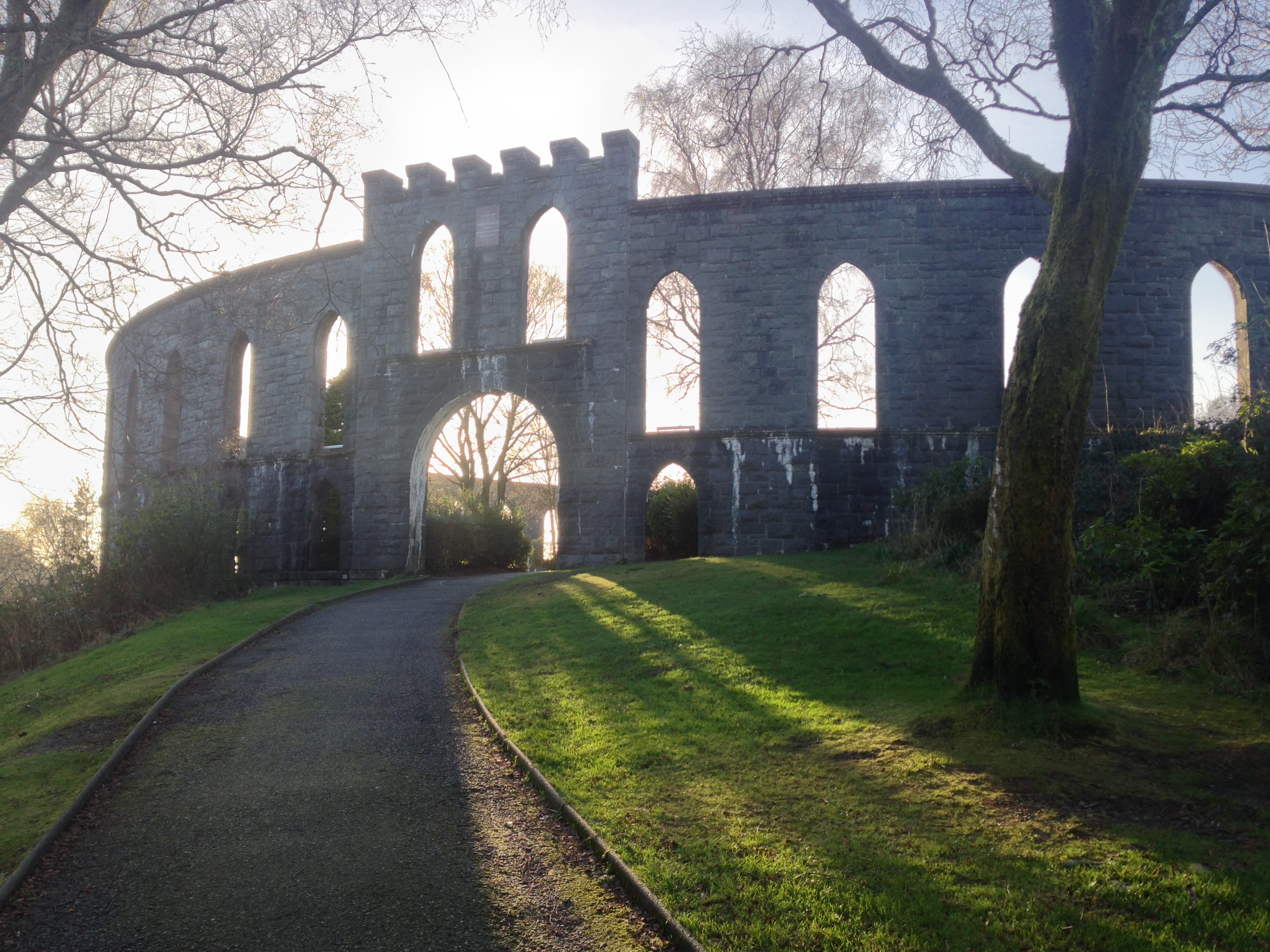
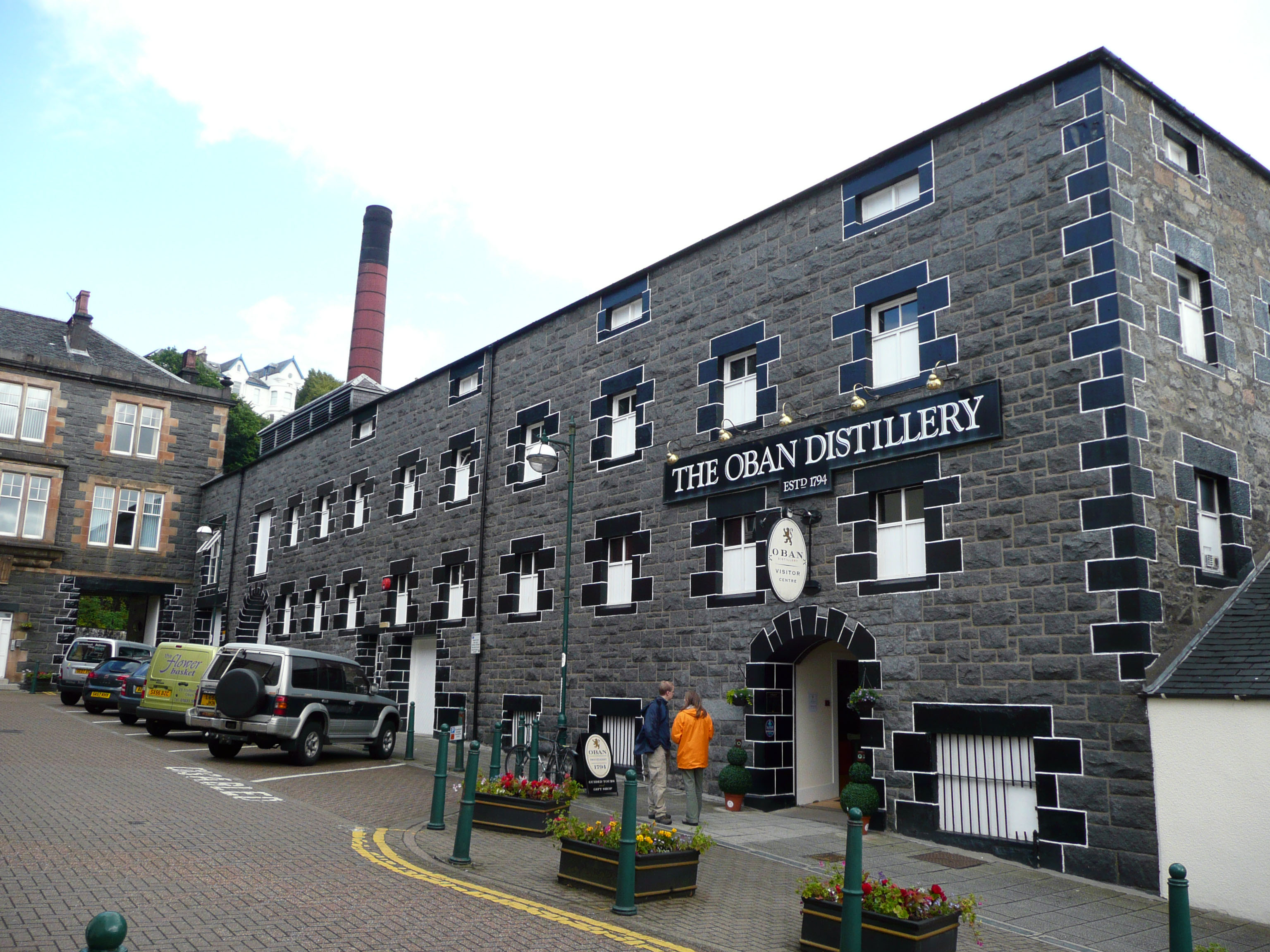
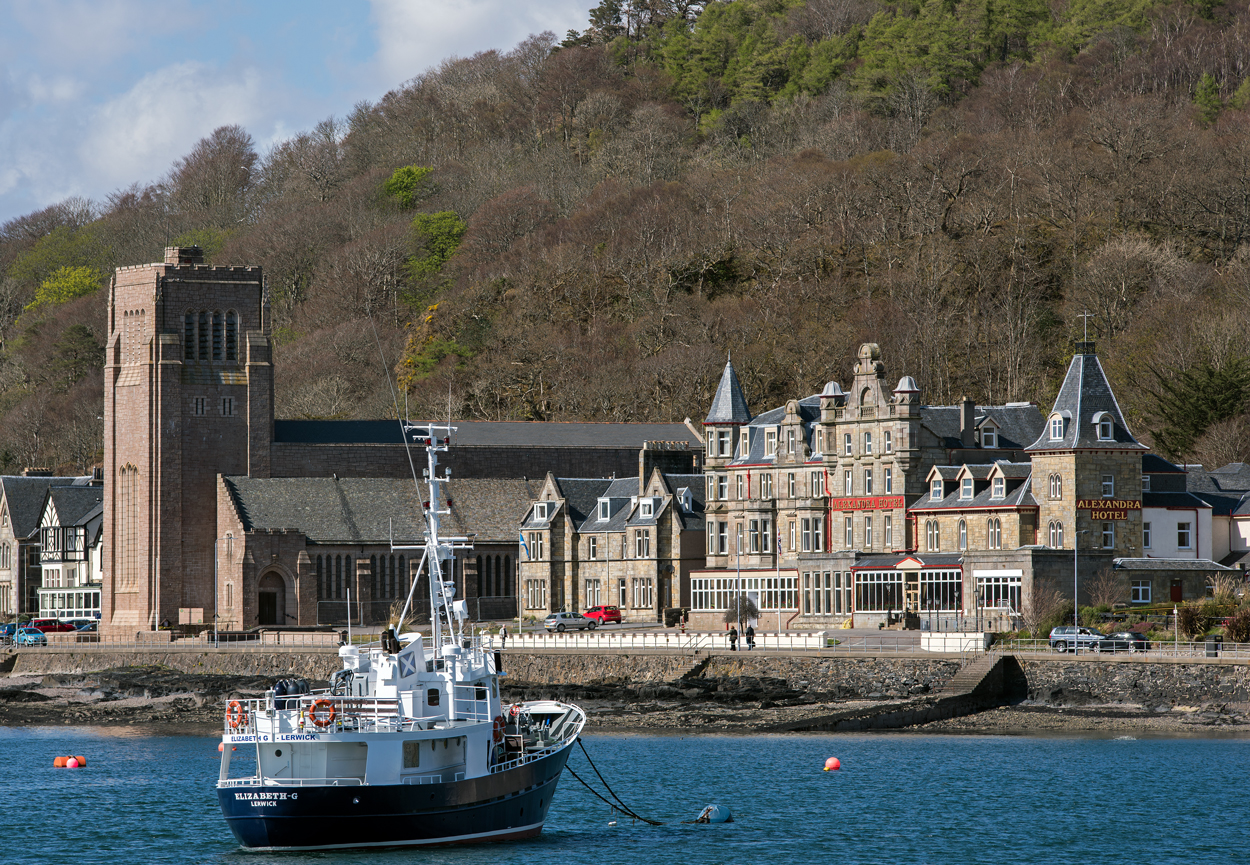
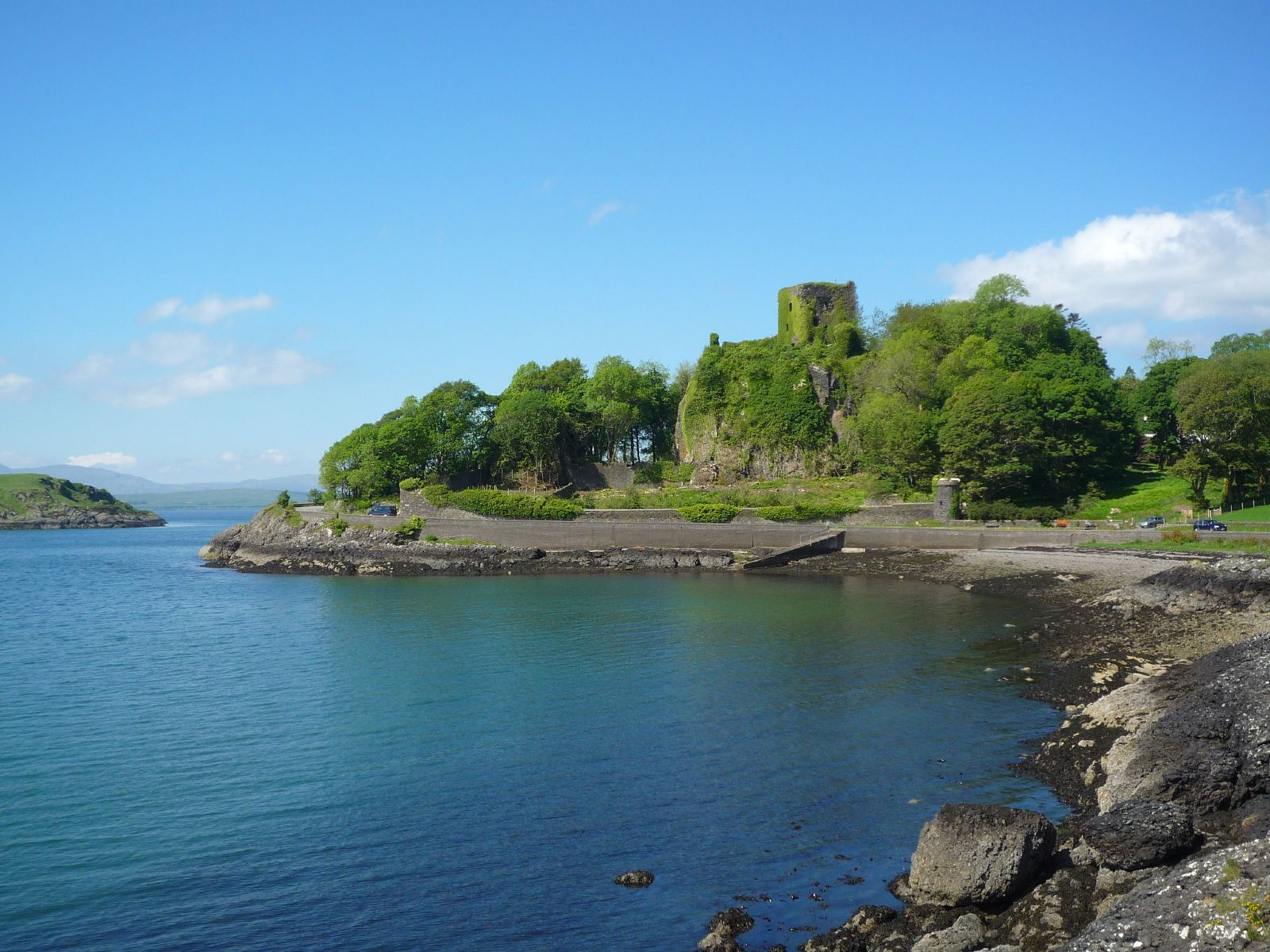
- Oban Harbour McCaig's Tower Oban distillery St Columba's Cathedral Dunollie Castle

- Location within Argyll and Bute
- Population: 8,000 (2022)
- OS grid reference: NM859298
  - Edinburgh: 93 mi (150 km)
  - London: 402 mi (647 km)
- Council area: Argyll and Bute
- Lieutenancy area: Argyll and Bute
- Country: Scotland
- Sovereign state: United Kingdom
- Post town: OBAN
- Postcode district: PA34
- Dialling code: 01631
- Police: Scotland
- Fire: Scottish
- Ambulance: Scottish
- UK Parliament: Argyll, Bute and South Lochaber
- Scottish Parliament: Argyll and Bute

Oban (/ˈoʊbən/ OH-bən; Scottish Gaelic: An t-Òban [ən̪ˠ ˈt̪ɔːpan], lit. 'the little bay') is a resort town and seaport in the west of Scotland, within the Argyll and Bute council area. Although small, it is the largest town between Helensburgh and Fort William. Oban has a population of 8,000 (2022), which rises to over 24,000 during the tourist season. Oban is on the Firth of Lorn. The bay forms a near-perfect horseshoe, protected by the island of Kerrera and, beyond Kerrera, the Isle of Mull. To the north are the long, low island of Lismore and the mountains of Morvern and Ardgour.

== Pre-history and archaeology ==
Humans have used the site where Oban now stands since at least Mesolithic times, as evidenced by archaeological remains of cave dwellers found in the town. Just outside the town stands Dunollie Castle, on a site that overlooks the main entrance to the bay and has been fortified since the Bronze Age.

Just to the north of Oban, at Dunstaffnage, excavations in 2010 by Argyll Archaeology in advance of the development of the European Marine Science Park found evidence that people were also living in the area from the Neolithic to the Early Historic periods. The archaeologists discovered funerary pyres in use for several generations during the Late Iron Age, and a farmstead occupied between the late 7th and 9th centuries AD.

== History ==
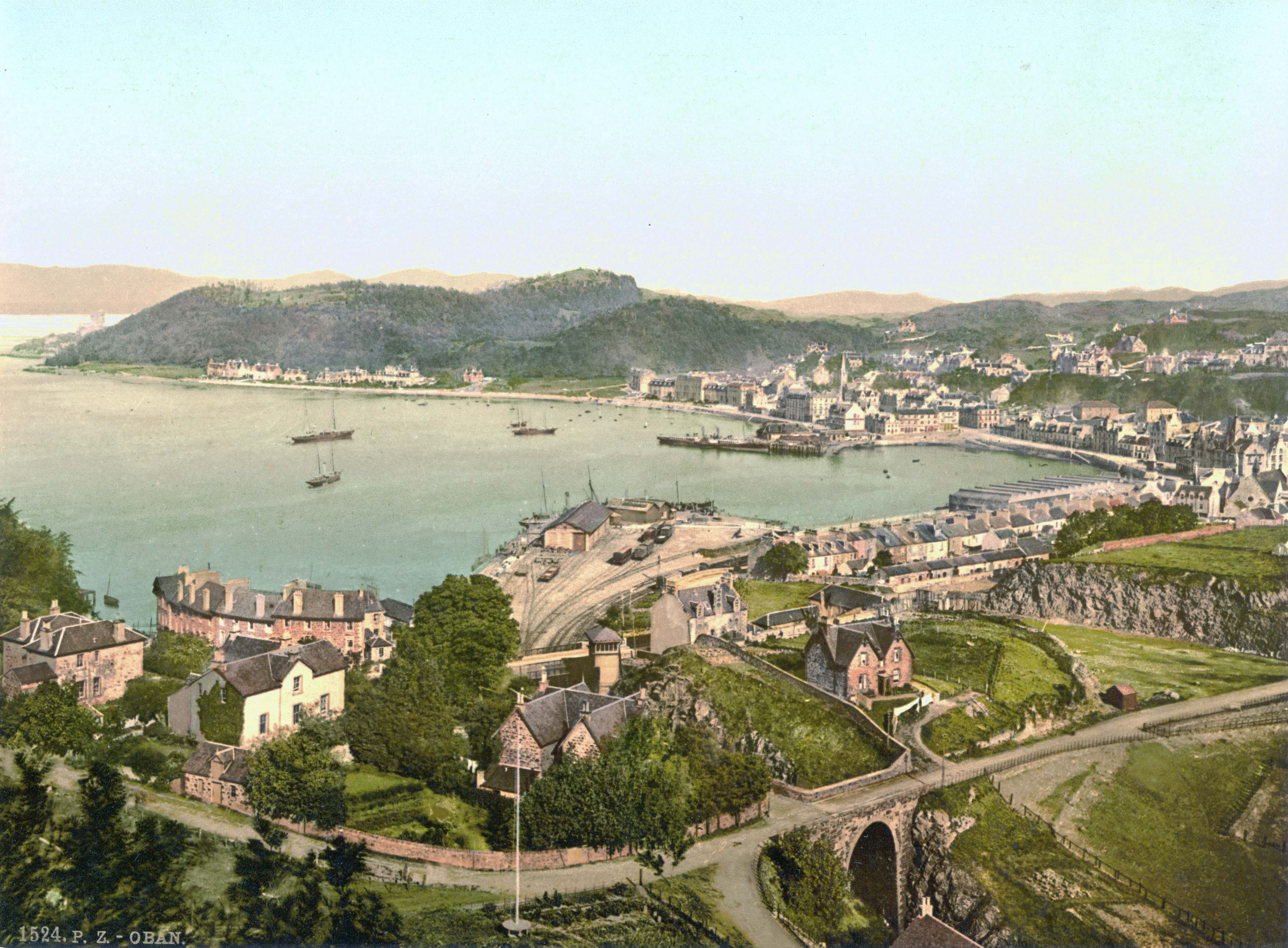
Oban in 1900

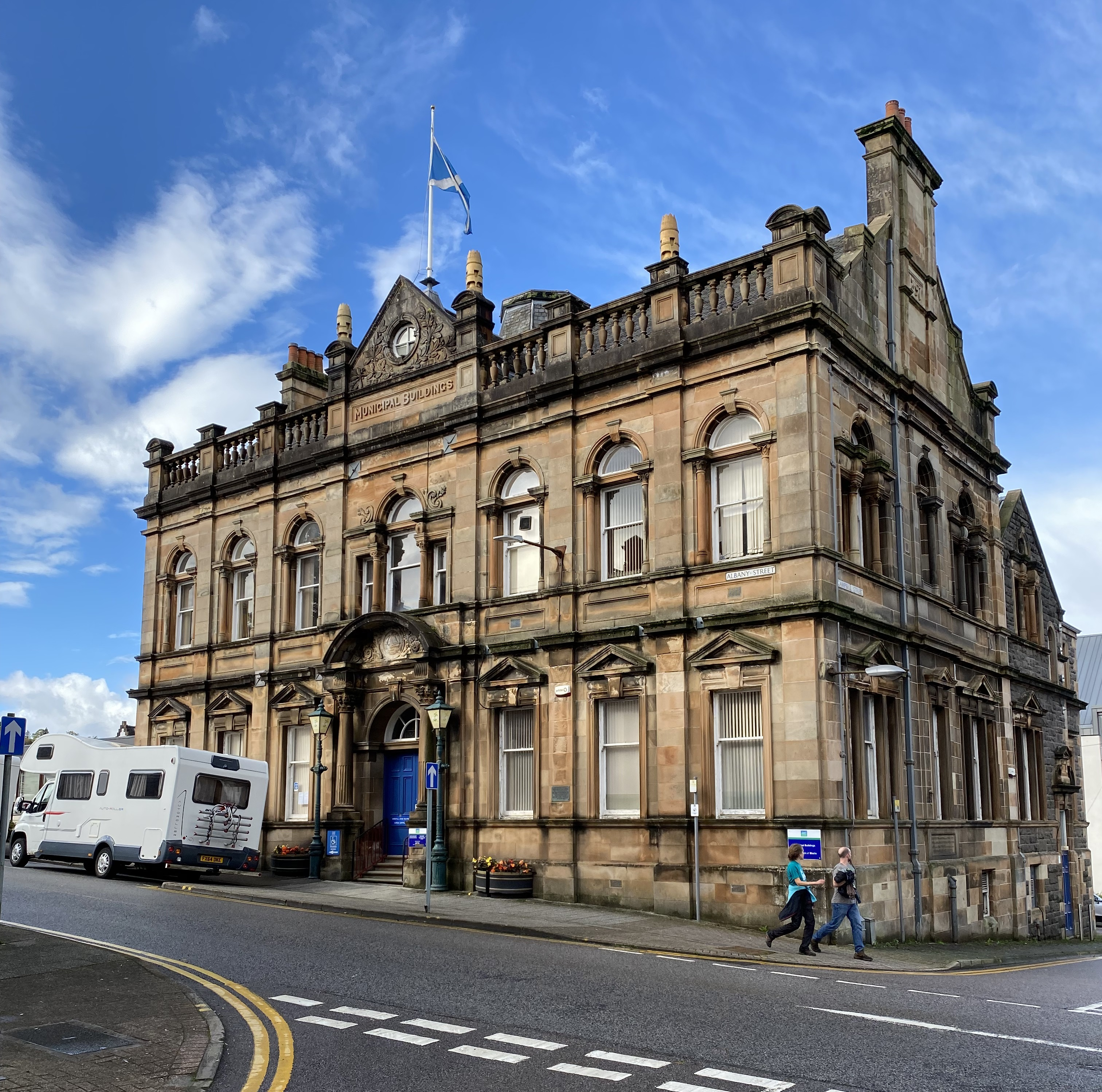
Oban Municipal Buildings

Prior to the 19th century, the town itself supported very few households, sustaining only minor fishing, trading, shipbuilding and quarrying industries, and a few hardy tourists. The Renfrew trading company established a storehouse there around 1714, as a local outlet for its merchandise, but a custom-house was not deemed necessary until 1736, with "Oban being reckoned a proper place for clearing out vessels for the herring fishery".

The modern town of Oban grew up around the distillery, which was founded there in 1794. A royal charter raised the town to a burgh of barony in 1811. Sir Walter Scott visited the area in 1814, the year in which he published his poem The Lord of the Isles; interest in the poem brought many new visitors to the town. The town was made a Parliamentary Burgh in 1833. A rail link – the Callander and Oban Railway – was authorised in 1864, but took years to reach the town. The final stretch of track to Oban opened on 30 June 1880. This brought further prosperity, revitalising local industry and giving new energy to tourism. Also at this time work on the ill-fated Oban Hydro commenced; the enterprise was abandoned and left to fall into disrepair after 1882 when Dr Orr, the scheme's originator, realised he had grossly underestimated its cost. Work on McCaig's Tower, a prominent local landmark, started in 1895. Paid for by John Stewart McCaig (1824–1902) the construction aimed, in hard times, to give work for local stonemasons. However, its construction ceased in 1902 on the death of its benefactor. The Oban Municipal Buildings were completed in around 1900.

Built in 1897 for James Gemmel Boutein, Glencruitten House was built on the site of an earlier estate. Now Category B Listed, the building is a Scottish-style castle, or Scots Baronial house, that was significantly altered in 1903. A library wing was added in 1927/1928. The original architect, Edward Appin, was also involved in the work completed in 1903. Robert Lorimer of the Lorimer & Matthew firm, guided the additions made in the 1920s for Alexander Mackay, the owner at that time. The House has been a B-listed property since 1971. The contents were to be sold off by auction in 2003, including some furniture designed by Lorimer. Reports at that time shed additional light on the previous owners of the House, indicating that the MacKay family "at the Argyll house" had owned the property for four generations, since 1917 when it was acquired by "the venture capitalist Alexander MacKay"; the original owner was listed as the Shelly-Bonteyn family. MacKay and his son Robert Ferrier Burns Mackay were said to be significant collectors of art, including works by "Sir David Young Cameron (1865–1945) and James McBey (1883–1959)". For some time prior to 2020, Glencruitten House was owned by a religious community who listed it for sale that year. The listing for sale provided additional specifics: the House contained "woodwork and panelling believed to be by Clow Bros and Louis Davis stained glass windows. Also within the library is an original grade A listed Ingram organ with Welte Philharmonic roleplay mechanism (not fully operational)". The listing also stated that "remedial work [was] recently undertaken by the current owner".

During World War II (1939–1945), Merchant and Royal Navy ships used Oban as an important base in the Battle of the Atlantic. The Royal Navy had a signal station near Ganavan, and an anti-submarine indicator loop station, which detected any surface or submarine vessels between Oban, Mull and Lismore. There was a controlled minefield in the Sound of Kerrera, which was operated from a building near the caravan site at Gallanach. A Royal Air Force flying-boat base operated at Ganavan and on Kerrera, and an airfield at North Connel – built by the Royal Air Force. A Sector Operations Room was built near the airfield; after the war, this was extended to become the Royal Observer Corps Group HQ.

Oban was also important during the Cold War because the first Transatlantic Telephone Cable (TAT-1) came ashore at Gallanach Bay. This carried the Hot Line between the US Presidents and USSR General Secretaries.

Since the 1950s, the principal industry has been tourism. However, the town is also an important ferry port, acting as the hub for Caledonian MacBrayne ferries to many of the islands of the Inner and Outer Hebrides.

The Royal National Lifeboat Institution opened Oban Lifeboat Station in 1972.

=== Fishing ===
The Annual Reports of the Fishery Board for Scotland provide an insight into the state of fishing from Oban and Loch Etive in the years before the First World War.

Fishery Statistics

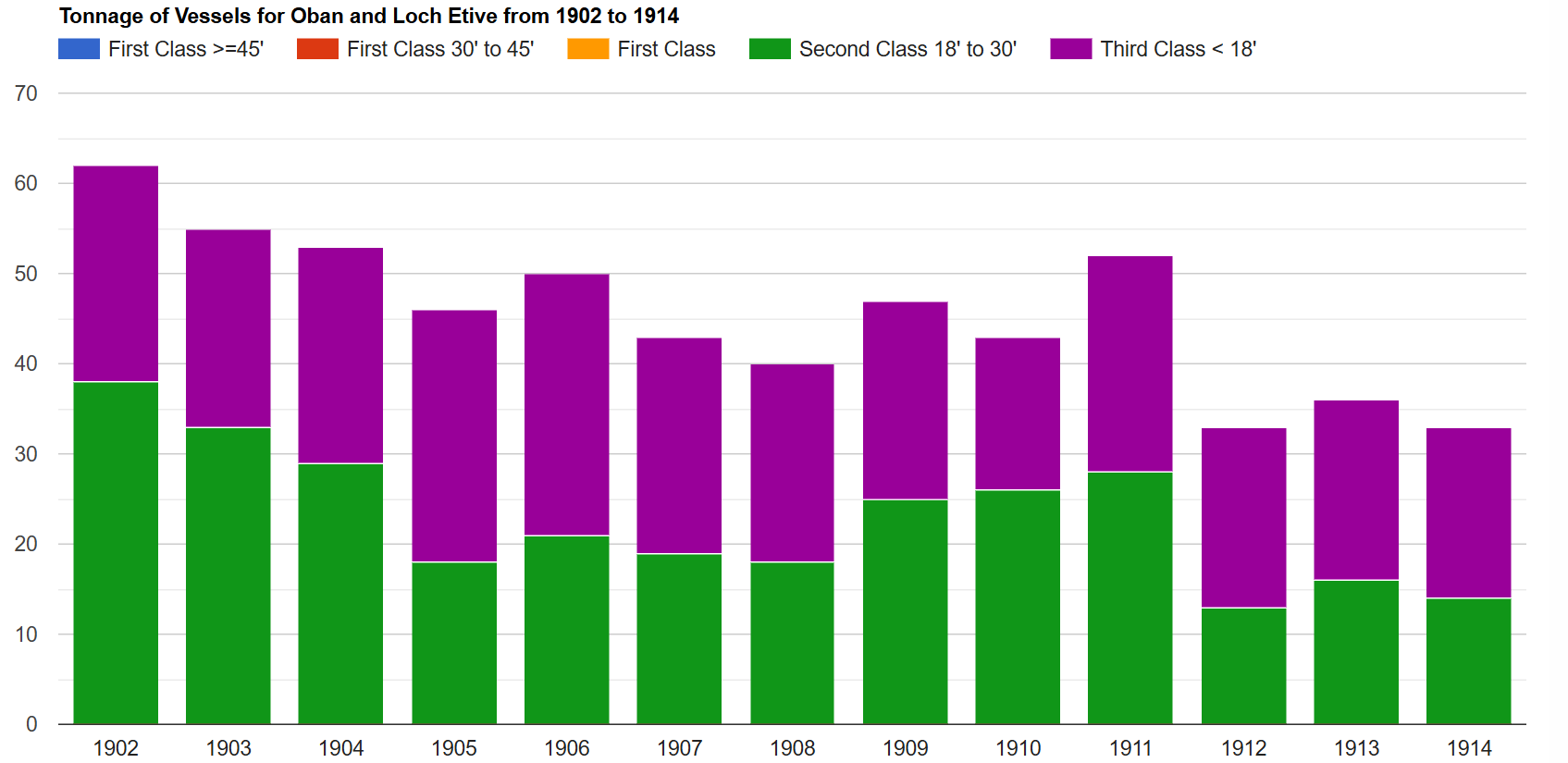
Tonnage of vessels

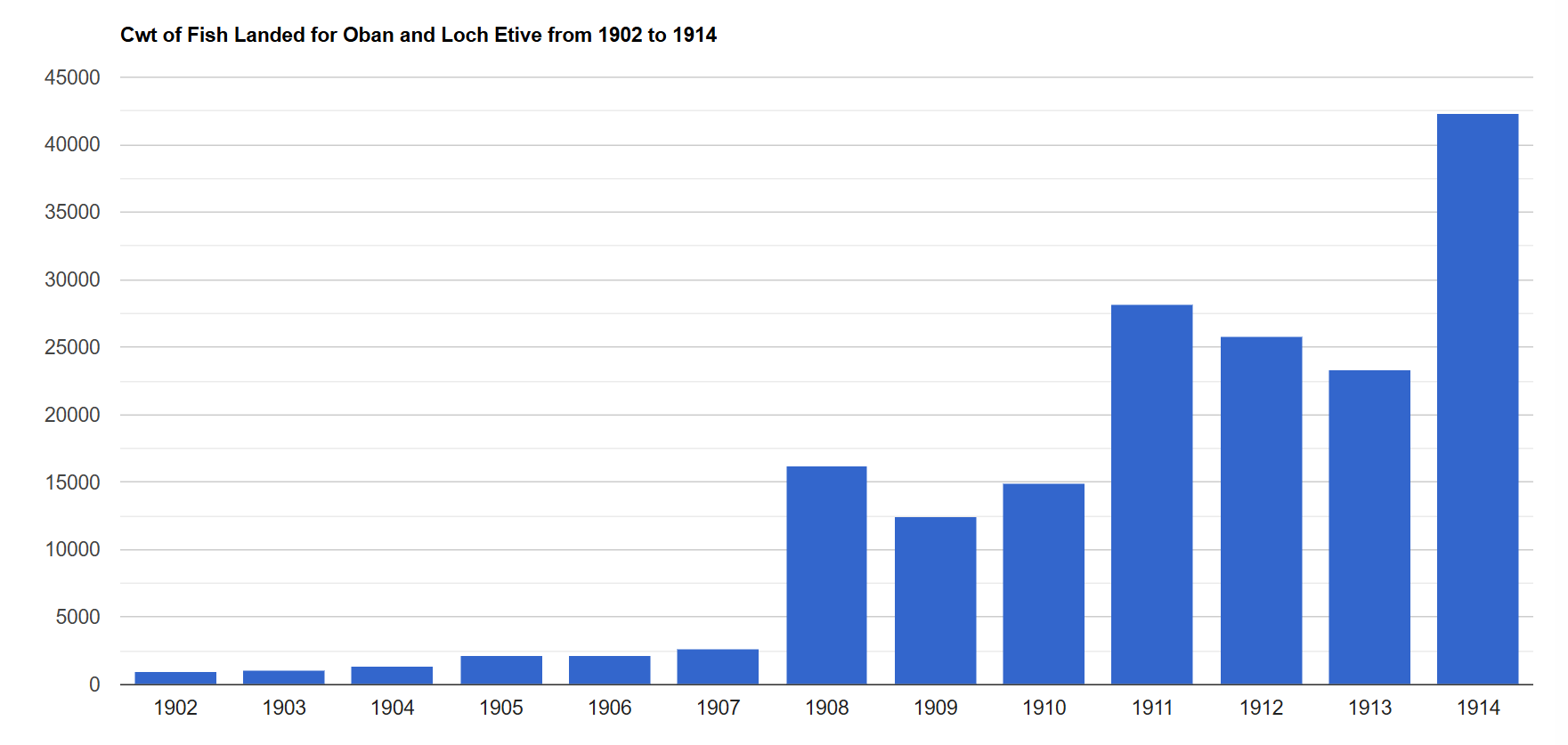
Cwt of fish landed

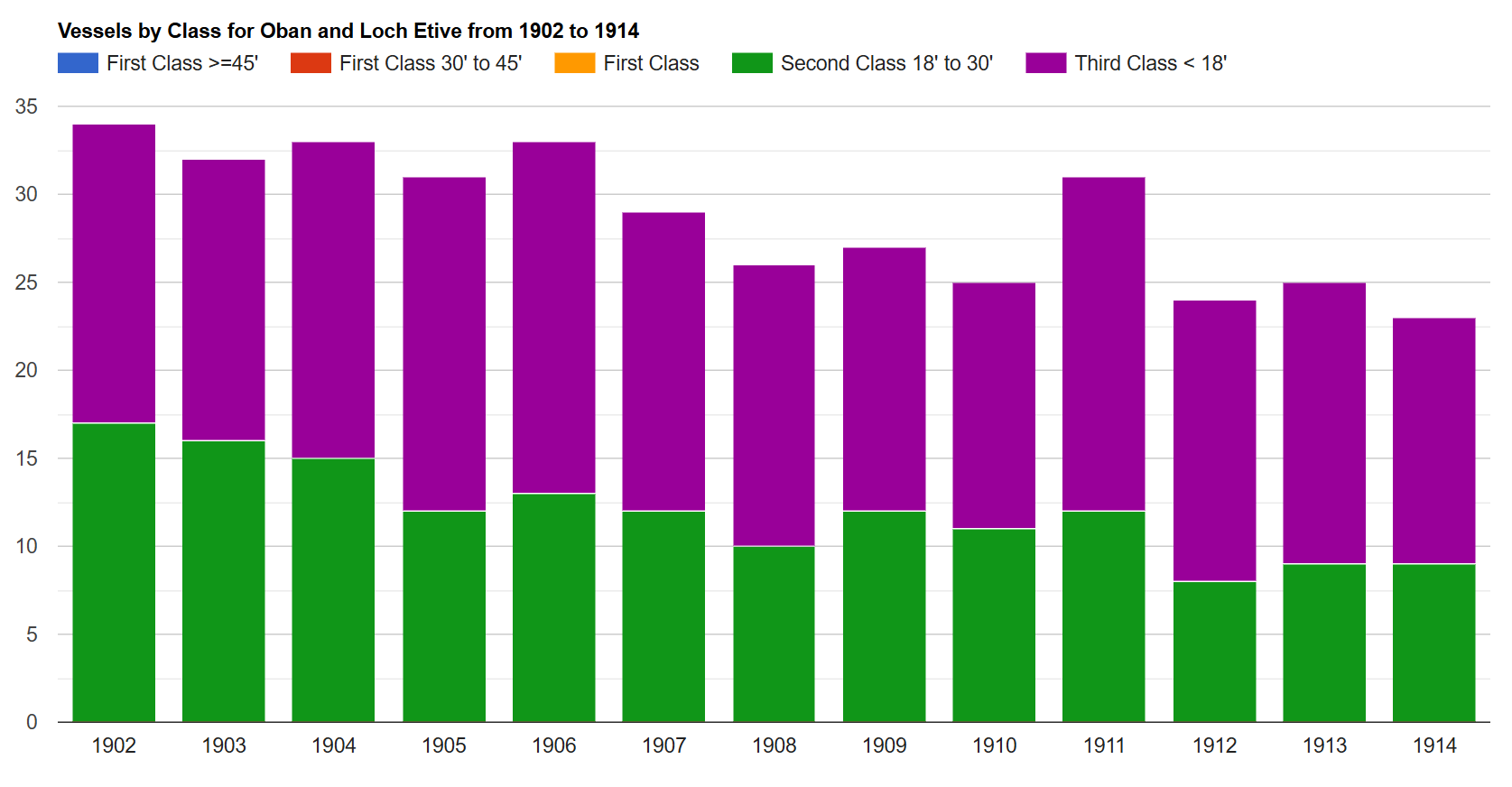
Vessels by class

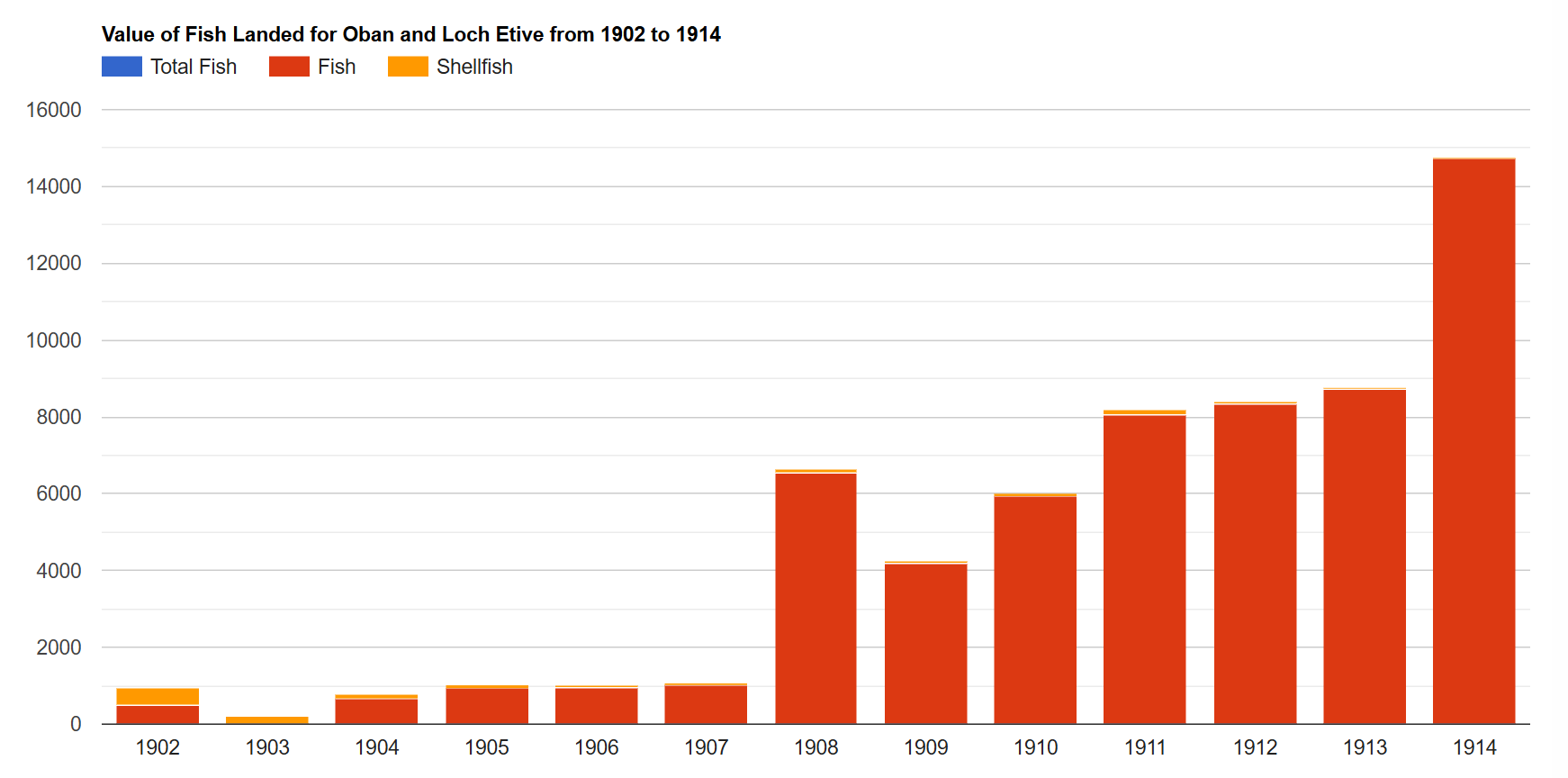
Value (£) of fish landed

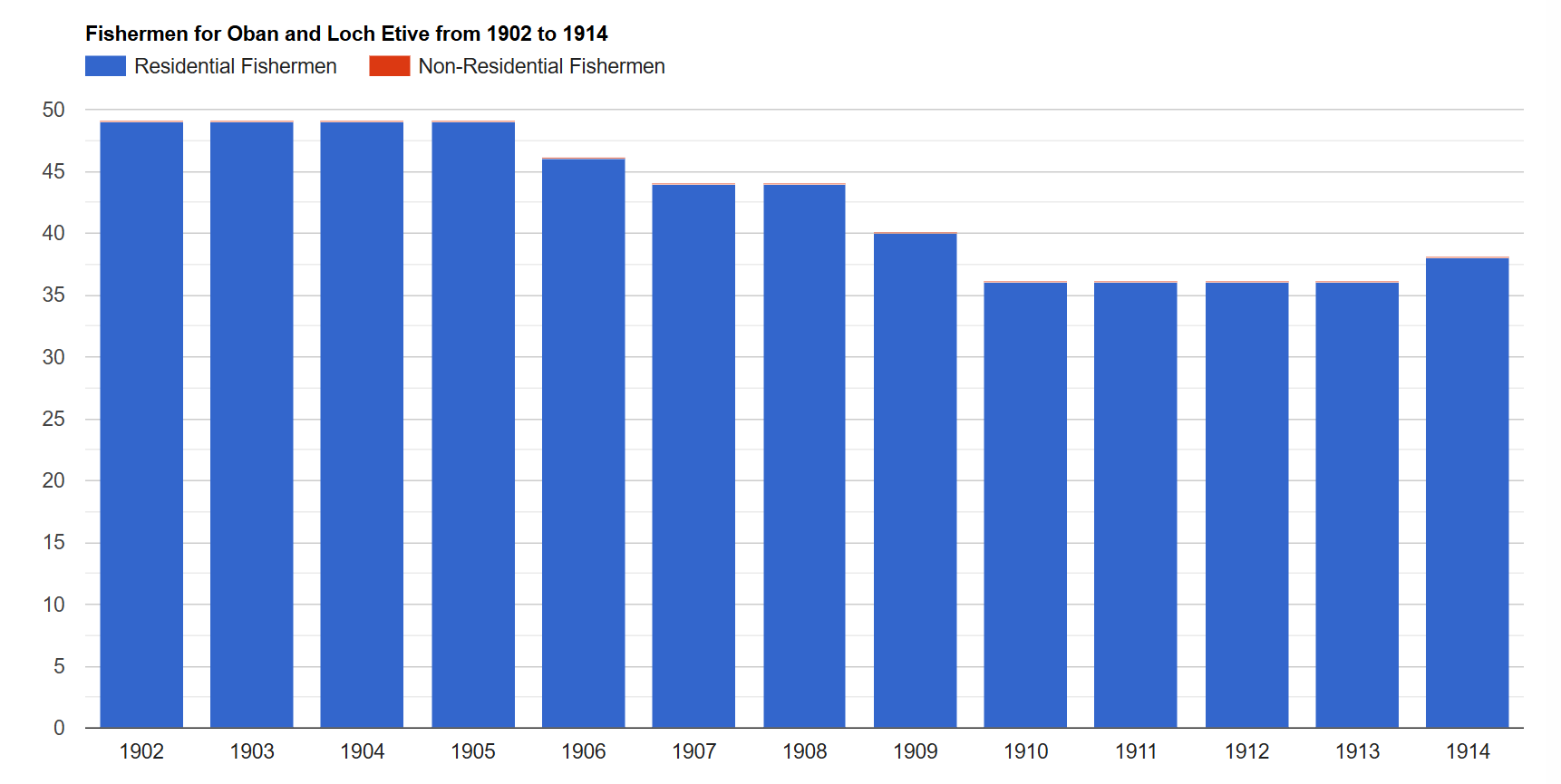
Fishermen

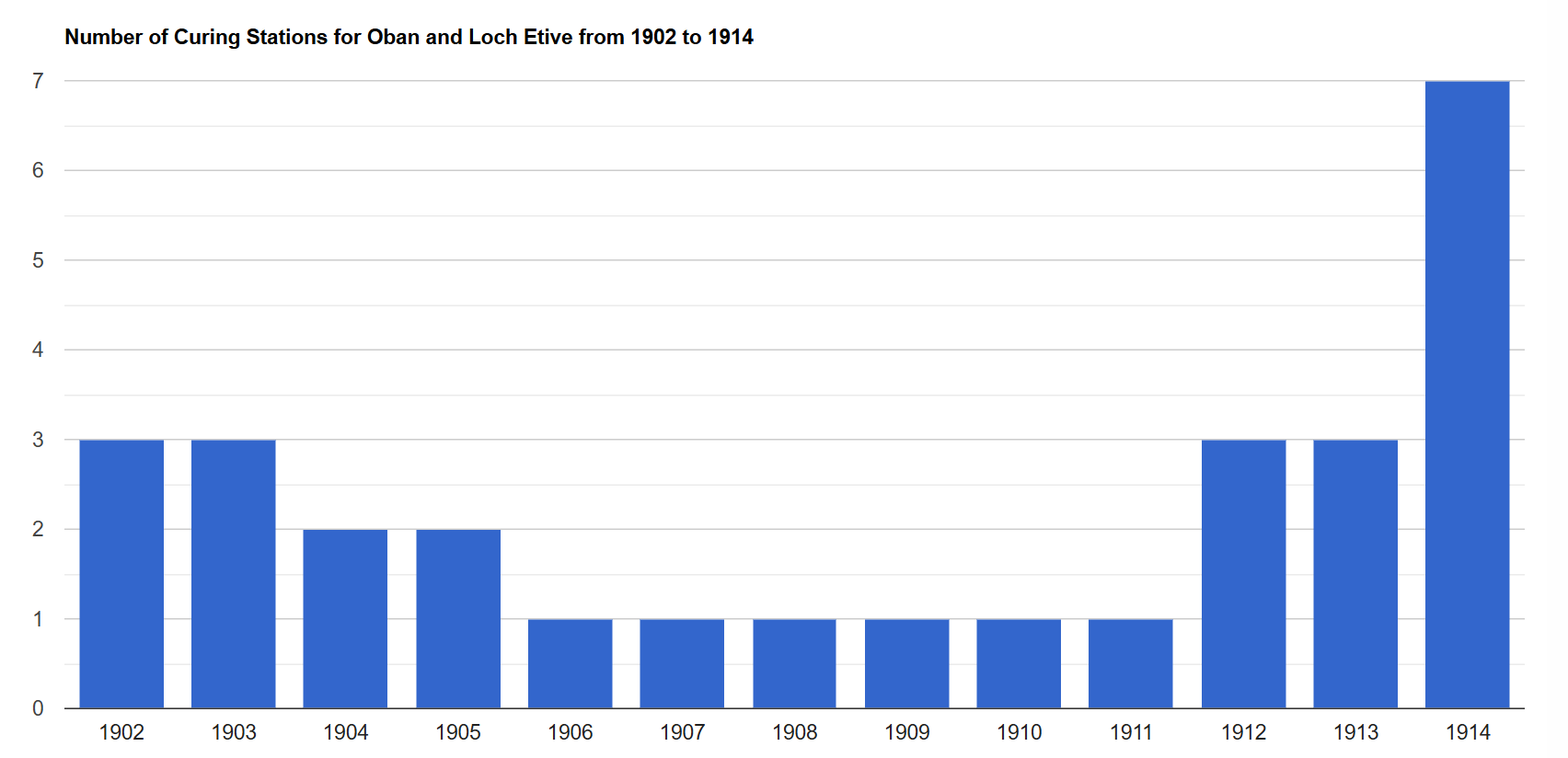
Placeholder- no curing stations

Compared with later years, the landings in 1904 were quite modest: "Except during the first three months of the year, when the local fleet is augmented by one or more East Coast boats, the landings are insignificant for the number of boats and men hailing from the port."

In 1908 they improved significantly: "Successful great-line fishing by a number of East Coast steamers in [the] early months of [the] year. Trawlers also landed an increased quantity. Results show fully five times the quantity recorded for 1907" In 1911 there was "a large increase in the quantity landed, chiefly herrings attributable to steamers operating on the Irish coast, and a moderately successful attempt to establish a herring fishery in May and June. Trawling results show a falling off."

== Climate ==
As with the rest of the British Isles, Oban experiences a maritime climate with cool summers and mild winters. The nearest official Met Office weather station for which online records are available is located at Dunstaffnage, about 2.7 miles (4.3 km) north-north-east of Oban town centre. Rainfall is high, but thanks to the Gulf Stream, the temperature seldom falls below 0 °C (32 °F).

Climate data for Dunstaffnage (1991-2020 normals, extremes 1972-2022)
Month	Jan	Feb	Mar	Apr	May	Jun	Jul	Aug	Sep	Oct	Nov	Dec	Year
Record high °C (°F)	13.9 (57.0)	14.9 (58.8)	18.7 (65.7)	23.7 (74.7)	27.2 (81.0)	29.1 (84.4)	29.3 (84.7)	28.6 (83.5)	25.9 (78.6)	20.1 (68.2)	17.0 (62.6)	14.8 (58.6)	29.3 (84.7)
Mean daily maximum °C (°F)	7.5 (45.5)	7.8 (46.0)	9.3 (48.7)	11.9 (53.4)	14.9 (58.8)	16.8 (62.2)	18.2 (64.8)	18.1 (64.6)	16.2 (61.2)	13.1 (55.6)	10.0 (50.0)	8.0 (46.4)	12.7 (54.8)
Mean daily minimum °C (°F)	2.7 (36.9)	2.6 (36.7)	3.4 (38.1)	5.0 (41.0)	7.1 (44.8)	9.6 (49.3)	11.4 (52.5)	11.4 (52.5)	9.9 (49.8)	7.5 (45.5)	5.0 (41.0)	2.9 (37.2)	6.5 (43.8)
Record low °C (°F)	−8.7 (16.3)	−7.2 (19.0)	−6.0 (21.2)	−3.9 (25.0)	−1.9 (28.6)	0.8 (33.4)	4.2 (39.6)	2.7 (36.9)	−0.6 (30.9)	−2.3 (27.9)	−4.2 (24.4)	−8.3 (17.1)	−8.7 (16.3)
Average precipitation mm (inches)	206.2 (8.12)	156.0 (6.14)	137.1 (5.40)	91.6 (3.61)	94.9 (3.74)	95.8 (3.77)	109.9 (4.33)	129.9 (5.11)	140.9 (5.55)	189.3 (7.45)	178.3 (7.02)	197.9 (7.79)	1,727.9 (68.03)
Average precipitation days (≥ 1 mm)	20.5	17.4	17.4	13.8	13.8	14.2	15.7	16.8	16.3	19.0	19.7	19.6	204.1
Mean monthly sunshine hours	32.4	62.6	94.9	147.2	192.1	171.0	135.0	135.4	99.1	77.7	46.3	33.3	1,227
Source 1: Met Office
Source 2: CEDA Archive (extremes)

== Culture ==
The local culture is Gaelic. In 2011, 8.2% of the town's population over age 3 could speak Gaelic and 11.3% had some facility in the language. Oban is considered the home of the Royal National Mòd, since it was first held there in 1892, with ten competitors on a Saturday afternoon. The town hosted the centenary Mod in 1992 (the year it became Royal) and in 2003 the 100th Mod. These two events attracted thousands of competitors and visitors (the 100th Mod was later than the centenary because it was not held in the war years). The Mod is held in Oban roughly every 6–8 years, and has last been held in October 2024.

An annual Highland Games, known as the Argyllshire Gathering, is also held in the town.

The Corran Halls theatre acts as a venue for community events, local and touring entertainers, and touring companies such as Scottish Opera.

The town had a two-screen cinema, which closed in early 2010. Thanks to a local community initiative supported by a number of famous names, it reopened in August 2012 as the Phoenix Cinema. The Phoenix Cinema closed on 3 June 2024 due to declining ticket sales and rising operating costs. Oban has itself been used as a backdrop to several films, including Ring of Bright Water and Morvern Callar.

The Oban War and Peace Museum advances the education of present and future generations by collecting, maintaining, conserving and exhibiting items of historical and cultural interest relating to the Oban area in peacetime and during the war years. A museum also operates within Oban Distillery, just behind the main seafront. The distillation of whisky in Oban predates the town: whisky has been produced on the site since 1794. The Hope MacDougall collection is a unique record of the working and domestic lives of people in Scotland.

Music is central to Gaelic culture, and there is lively interest in the town. In the 2010 pipe band season, the local Oban High School Pipe Band, led by Angus MacColl, was successful in winning the World Pipe Band Championships in Glasgow, the Cowal Games competition, and the Champion of Champions for the year in the novice-juvenile grade. The town also boasts a successful senior pipe band. The local Gaelic choir competes regularly and successfully in the Mod.

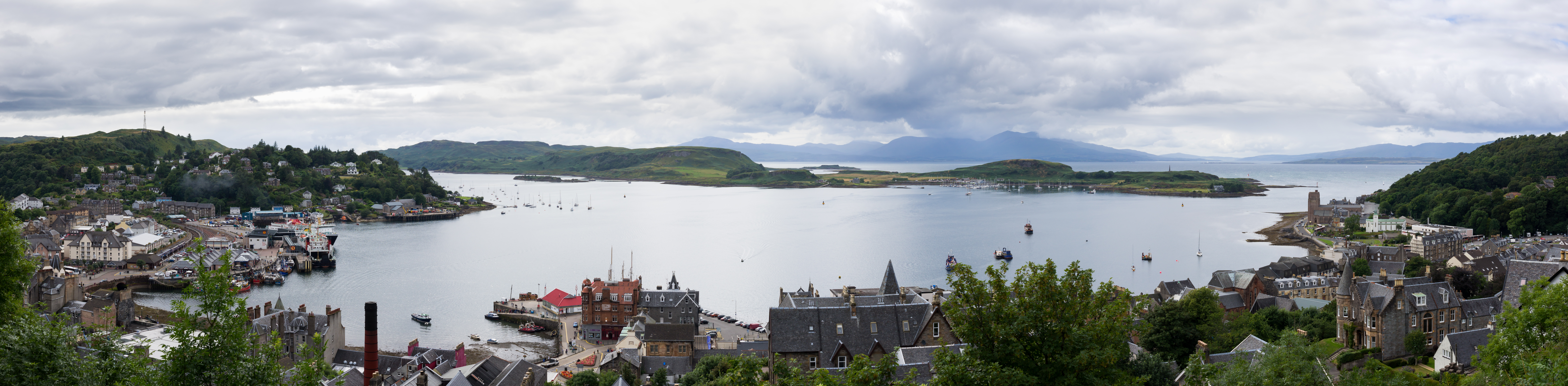
Oban Bay from McCaig's Tower. The bay is sheltered by the island of Kerrera. Behind lies the Isle of Mull.
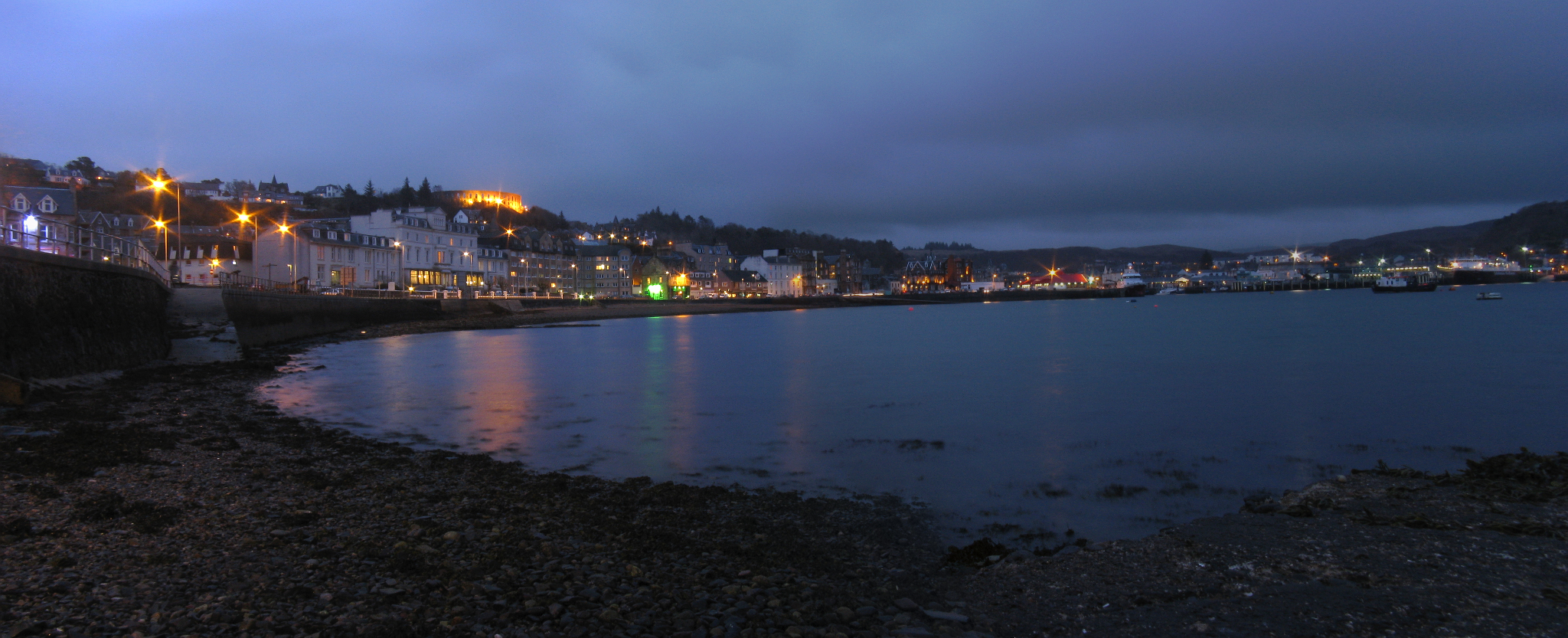
Oban and bay at night, note McCaig's Tower is illuminated.

== Local attractions ==
The most prominent attraction in Oban is McCaig's Tower which is visible from a great portion of the town. Construction of the tower began in 1897, funded by John Stuart McCaig as a way of providing work for local stonemasons and to serve as a lasting legacy for his family. McCaig died in 1902, and although construction was set to continue, with McCaig promising £1000 a year for its construction to continue, his family challenged this in court and won, stopping construction.

The area around Oban has a dramatic scenery of the coast and mountains, as well as historically valuable local castles and ancient religious sites. North of the town the natural rock formation of Fingal's Dogstone is connected in legend to the Giant's Causeway in Northern Ireland.

The Oban Visitor Information Centre, operated by VisitScotland, is located in the Columba Buildings on the North Pier (closed as of October 2024). The Oban & Lorn Tourism Alliance also provides information about local attractions at the official web site.

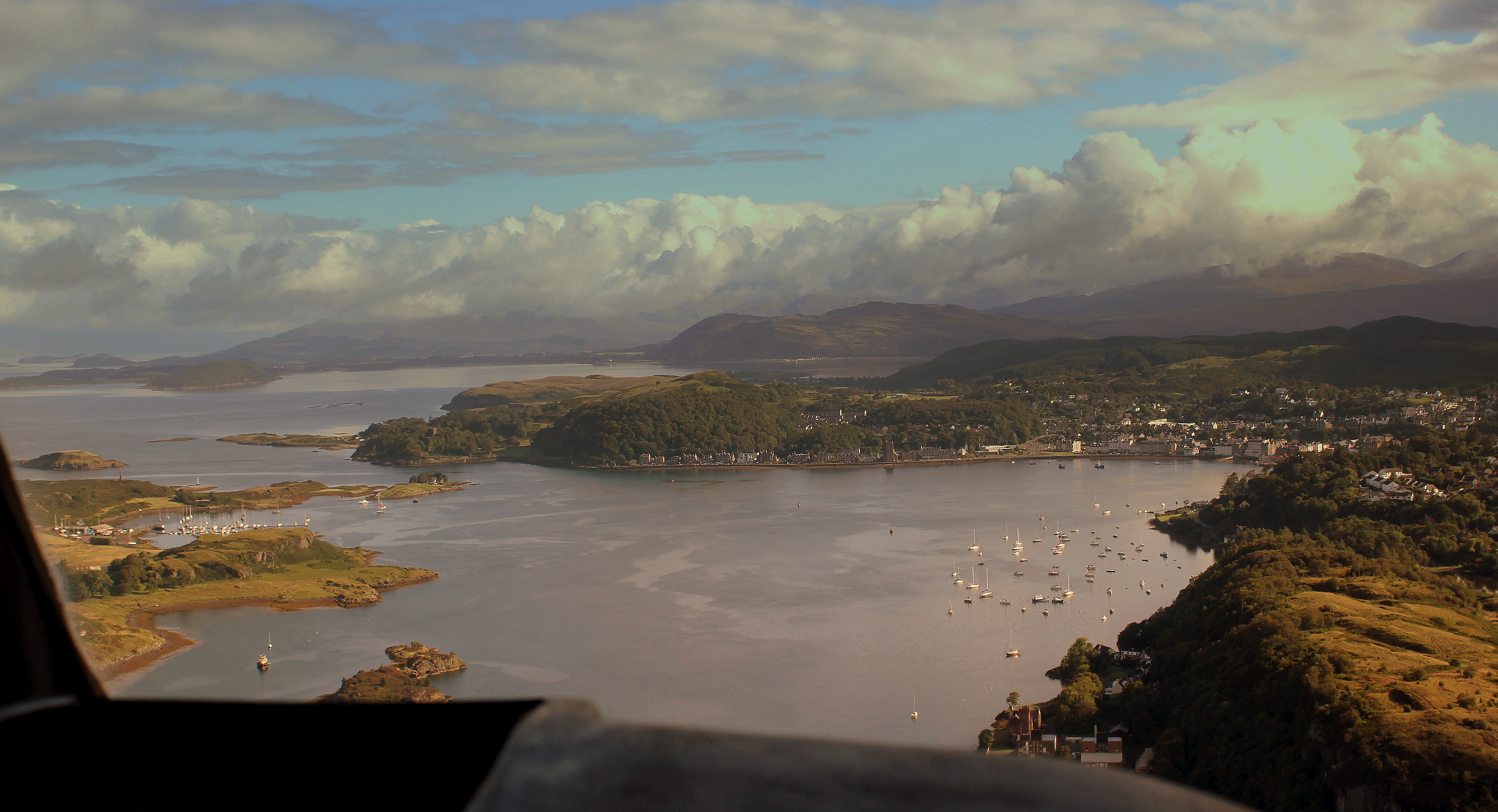
Bay aerial view

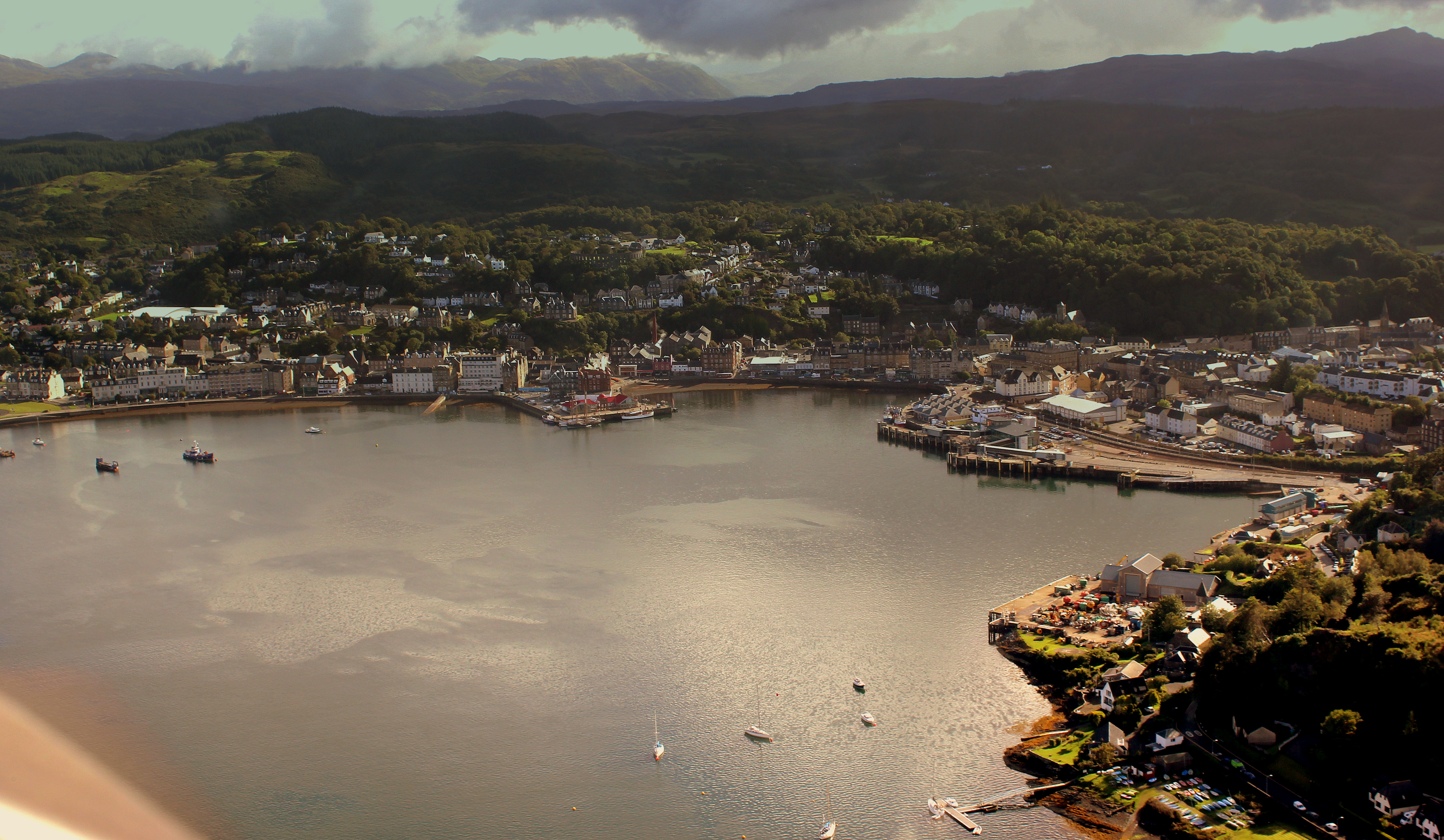
Town aerial view

== Transport ==
Oban lies at the western end of the A85 road. A number of ScotRail trains run between Oban railway station and Glasgow Queen Street daily. The town is an important ferry port: it is Caledonian MacBrayne's busiest terminal. Oban is known as the "Gateway to the Isles", with ferries sailing to the islands of Lismore, Colonsay, Islay, Coll, Tiree, to Craignure on Mull, to Castlebay on Barra and to Lochboisdale on South Uist. In 2005, a new ferry terminal was opened, and in 2007 a second linkspan opened, allowing two vessels to load/unload at the same time.

Scottish Citylink run buses from Glasgow's Buchanan bus station several times a day; in summer, buses run from Dundee via Perth (route 973) and to Edinburgh via Stirling (route 978).

West Coast Motors operate many local services and also coach links as far south as Lochgilphead and as far north as Fort William.

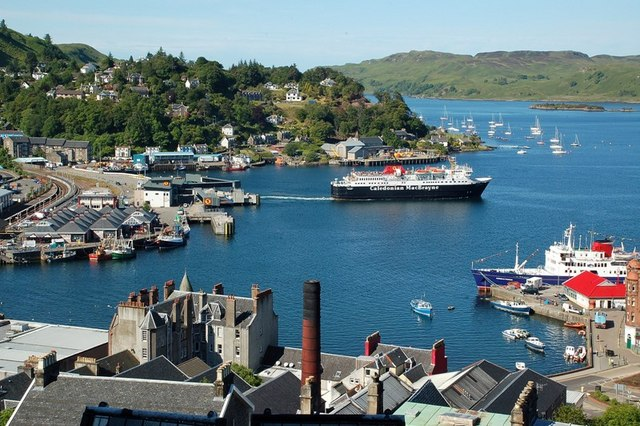
The Isle of Mull ferry leaving the terminal

Formerly, Oban also had direct passenger railway services to Edinburgh. The scenic line, which ran via Glen Dochart, Strathyre, Callander, Dunblane and Stirling, closed in 1965. Railway services north to Ballachulish on Loch Leven were withdrawn in 1966. (These services were withdrawn as a result of the Beeching cuts.)

Oban has an airport outside the village of North Connel, some 5 miles (8 km) NE of the town. The airport has regular connections to Islay, Colonsay and Tiree, with flight-times of just half an hour. The code for Oban Airport is (OBN) and the only airline flying from the airport is Hebridean Air Services. The airport featured in a 2021 episode of Top Gear.

== Education ==
Oban has a primary school campus located in the south of the town along with Park Primary School at the north of the town, and a major high school, Oban High School. In 2019, £36 million was spent on a new building for the high school, replacing the original 1890 building which was subsequently demolished.

Secondary school pupils are drawn from a wide surrounding catchment area, with some pupils having long commutes to and from school every day. Students who live on surrounding islands such as Coll or Mull stay at a local hostel during the school week. The school funds the hostel so that the families of the students do not have to pay themselves.

The building formerly used as Rockfield Primary School has now been taken over by the Community and is being extensively refurbished. It has also been used as a polling station for areas of the town.

Higher education in Oban is provided through the University of the Highlands and Islands (UHI). UHI Argyll operates a learning centre at Glenshellach, offering access to further and higher education courses. The Scottish Association for Marine Science (SAMS), based at Dunbeg near Oban, is an academic partner of UHI and provides undergraduate and postgraduate education in marine science, including bachelor's, master's and doctoral programmes.

== Media ==
Television signals are received from the Torosay and local relay transmitters.

For many years, Oban FM was the town's local radio station, which broadcast local news and entertainment. The station ceased broadcasting after 32 years in July 2024. In November 2024, Nevis Radio announced that it had been granted approval from Ofcom to extend its coverage to Oban. Nevis Radio launched on 103.3 FM on 21 May 2025.

The town is also served by BBC Radio Scotland on 93.3 FM.

The Oban Times is the weekly local newspaper which publishes on Thursdays.

== Churches ==
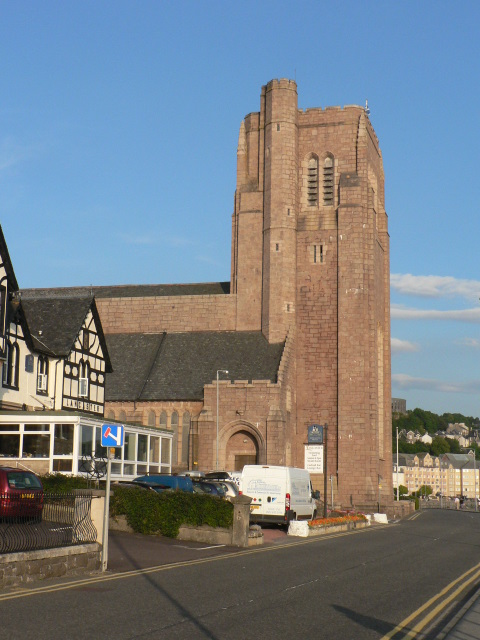
St Columba's Cathedral

Oban is served by Kilmore & Oban Parish Church of the Church of Scotland. There are two church buildings in the united parish, namely at Glencruitten Road as well as Kilmore Church. The minister (since 2007) is the Rev. Dugald Cameron, who formerly served at St. John's Renfield Church, Glasgow.

A third church, the former Corran Esplanade Church (opened in 1957 as Christ Church) at Corran Esplanade in the town, is now closed.

A fourth church, St Columba's Argyll Square Church was opened in 1888 and closed in 1984.

The mother church of the Roman Catholic Diocese of Argyll and the Isles is St Columba's Cathedral at the north end of the Esplanade. During the 19th century, the Rector of the Pro-Cathedral was Father Allan MacDonald, a poet and Gaelic scholar. The present cathedral was designed by Sir Giles Gilbert Scott and constructed between 1932 and 1959.

The Scottish Episcopal Church is represented in Oban by the Cathedral Church of St John the Divine, situated in George Street. It is one of two cathedrals of the united Diocese of Argyll and the Isles, the other being the Cathedral of the Isles in Millport, Isle of Cumbrae.

There are several other churches in the town, including the Free Church of Scotland in Rockfield Road, the Baptist Church in Albany Street, Salvation Army in Stevenson Street, Elim Pentecostal Church in Soroba Road, The Church of Jesus Christ of Latter-day Saints and the Lorn Christian Fellowship (Independent) both of whom meet at Oban High School and the Associated Presbyterian Church in Campbell Street. The Congregational Church in Tweedale Street was built in 1880.

A Kingdom Hall of Jehovah's Witnesses is located nearby at 57 Lorn Road, Dunbeg.

=== Cemeteries ===
Pennyfuir Cemetery, to the north of the town, contains several notable burials, including Frances Shand Kydd, the mother of Diana, Princess of Wales, and four casualties of the 1942 Dunbeath air crash which also killed Prince George, Duke of Kent.

== Sport ==
Oban's proximity to the mountains and the sea means that a wide array of sports are available to visitors and locals, from scuba-diving to coasteering to sailing to mountain biking to winter mountaineering. Other activities of note in the town are:

The local amateur football team is Oban Saints with a small stadium situated in Mossfield. However, shinty is a more popular game locally, with two major teams, Oban Camanachd and Oban Celtic, in the town. The Oban Times runs a "Spot the Shinty Ball" competition each week. Oban Cricket Club was formed in 2003 and plays in nearby Taynuilt. Oban Lorne Rugby Football Club turned 50 years old in 2012, and competes in the RBS West region. The Highlanders were a World Wrestling Entertainment wrestling tag-team originally from Oban. Glencruitten Golf course was designed by professional golfer James Braid in the early 1900s, and offers a challenging 18 holes across difficult terrain.

The West Highland Tennis Championships are held annually in July and attract some of Scotland's best players to the town. Past champions include Colin Fleming and Judy Murray.

Oban also has a thriving martial arts scene, with karate, kick boxing, mixed martial arts, and boxing all available.

Watersports are an obvious activity in a seaport, and sailing is very popular. West Highland Week is a major attraction for sailors worldwide, bringing visitors to Oban each year and contributing to the popularity of Oban Marina. A raft race regularly takes place in the bay which offers a chance for locals to win prizes and trophies. Scuba diving is also readily available. The wreck diving is spectacular, with the Sound of Mull offering some truly world-class dive sites. Although weather and visibility can be variable, the local geography means that a dive somewhere can always be achieved.

== Notable people ==
- Charles Avery, artist.
- Magnus Bradbury, professional rugby player for Edinburgh Rugby and Scotland.
- Jamie Campbell-Walter, racing driver.
- Anna Keay, historian, author, and broadcaster.
- Robert MacIntyre, professional golfer for the European Tour and PGA Tour
- John McPhee, Grand Prix motorcyclist.
- Unity Mitford, fascist and aristocrat spent her final years in Oban.
- Susan Newell, the last woman to be hanged as capital punishment in Scotland.
- Aidan O'Rourke, folk musician and composer.
- Susan Partridge, long-distance runner who has represented Britain and Scotland.
- Frances Shand Kydd, mother of Princess Diana spent her final years near Oban.
- Susie Wolff, professional racing driver and managing director of the F1 Academy.

== Town twinning ==
Laurinburg, North Carolina, United States became a twin town to Oban in 1993. The initial agreement was between Scotland County, North Carolina, and Argyll & Bute District Council. Following reorganisation in 1995, the agreement was confirmed by Argyll & Bute Council in 1997. The local High School takes part in a yearly exchange with students from the Scotland High School. In 1997, Oban was also twinned with Gorey, County Wexford, Ireland.
