= Thomas Dalyell (disambiguation) =

Thomas Dalyell (1615–1685), Tam Dalyell of the Binns, was a Scottish general.

Thomas Dalyell may also refer to:

- Tam Dalyell (1932–2017), British politician
- Sir Thomas Dalyell of the Binns, 2nd Baronet (died 1719), of the Dalyell baronets

== See also ==
- Thomas Dalziel (1823–1906), illustrator of the works of Charles Dickens.
- Thomas Kennedy Dalziel, Scottish surgeon and pathologist
