= Lloyd's Patriotic Fund =

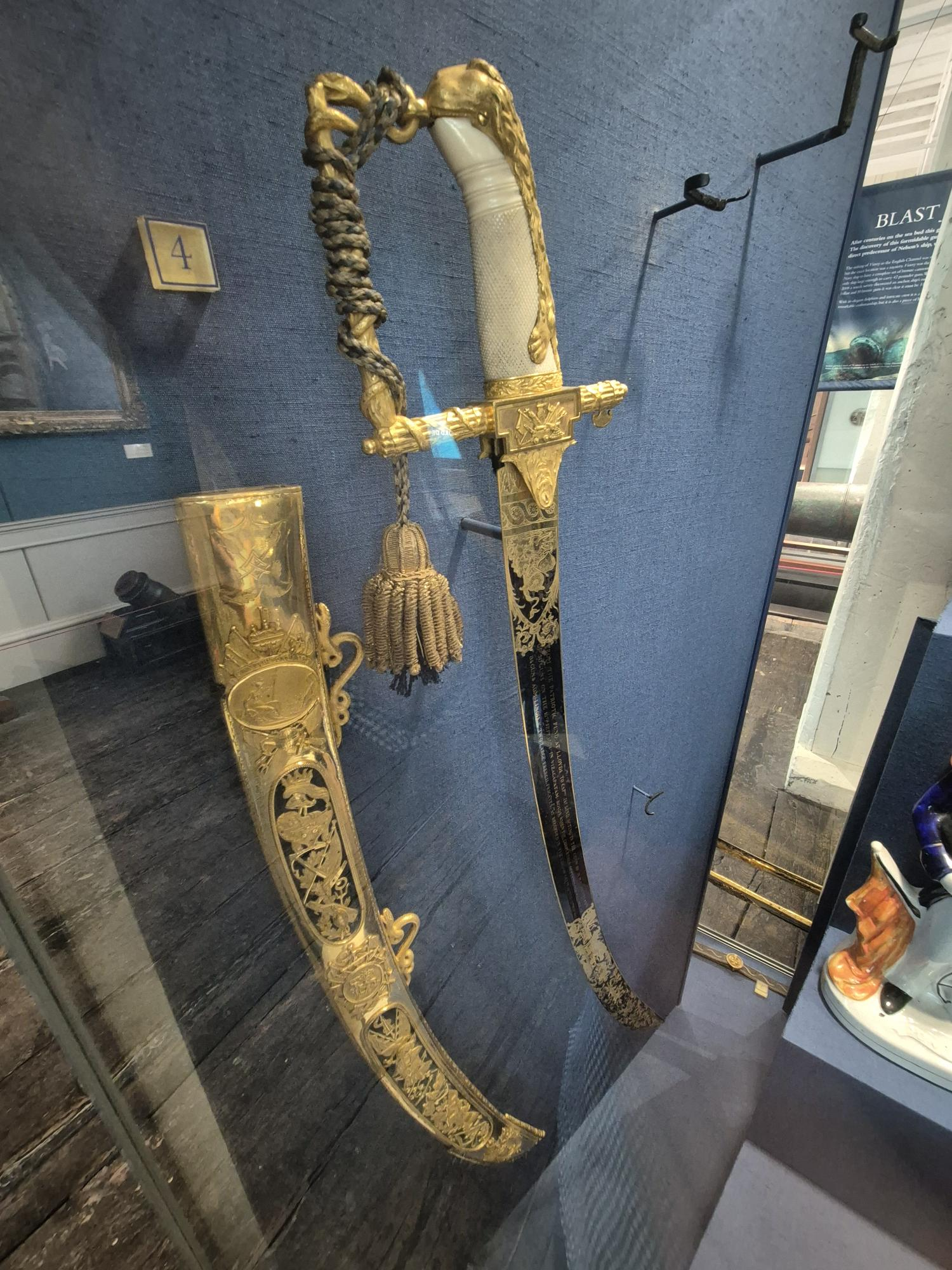
Lloyds sword of £100 value of Captain James Lind, commander of HMS Centurion, at the Royal Navy Museum

The Lloyd's Patriotic Fund is a British patriotic fund and charity. The fund issues financial payments and has issued presentation swords and other awards. The fund was founded on 28 July 1803 at Lloyd's Coffee House by a group of Lloyd's of London underwriters. It continues to the present day. The Lloyd’s Patriotic Fund now works closely with armed forces charities to identify the individuals and their families who are in urgent need of support.

== Awards ==
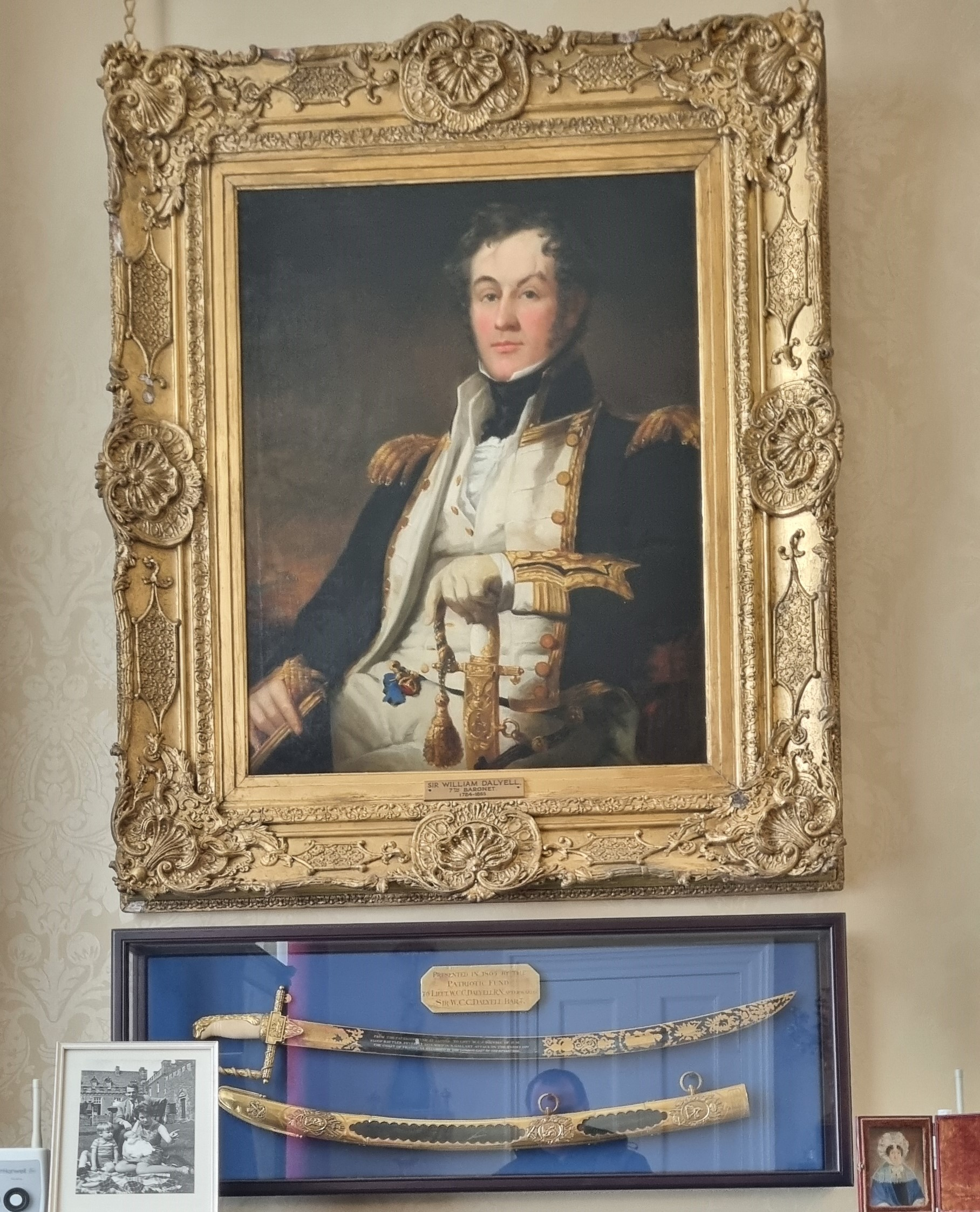
Lloyd's Patriotic Fund Presentation Sword of William Cunningham Dalyell at House of the Binns

The contributors created the fund to give grants to those wounded in service to the Crown and to set up annuities to the dependents, initially the widows, of those killed in action. The Fund also awarded prizes to those British combatants who went beyond the call of duty. The rewards could be a sum of money, a sword or a piece of plate. The awards were highly publicized to help raise morale during wartime.

=== Swords ===
The ornamental swords were produced with blued and gilt decoration, along with scabbard, plaque and presentation box. There were three values of sword awarded, £100, £50 and £30, subject to rank and the nature of the gallantry and action. In total some 151 swords are known to have been issued. The Fund issued 15 swords worth £30 each, to midshipmen, masters' mates and Royal Marine lieutenants. Also, 91 swords worth 50 pounds each went to naval lieutenants and Royal Marine captains. It issued 35 swords worth £100 each to commanders and naval captains. In addition, it issued 23 swords, worth £100 each, to naval captains who fought at Trafalgar. Some 60 officers requested a piece of plate of equal value instead of a sword. Lastly, a number of officers opted for cash instead, either for themselves or to distribute to their crew.

One engagement might result in multiple awards. When a cutting-out party from HMS Franchise captured Raposa in 1806, naval lieutenants John Fleming and Peter Douglas, and Lieutenant of Marines Mend, each received a sword worth £50, while Midshipman Lamb received one worth £30.

Not all the officers who received swords or other merit awards were naval officers or Royal Marines. Some were captains of privateers or East Indiamen. The Fund awarded Mr. Thomas Musgrave, captain of the private man of war Kitty an honour-sabre worth £30 for the action in which Kitty captured the Spanish ship Felicity (or Felicidad). After the Battle of Pulo Aura, Lloyd's Patriotic Fund gave each captain a sword worth £50, and one to Lieutenant Robert Merrick Fowler (RN), who had distinguished himself in a variety of capacities during the engagement, and one worth £100 to Captain Nathaniel Dance, who had been the commodore of the fleet.

=== Presentation Vases ===
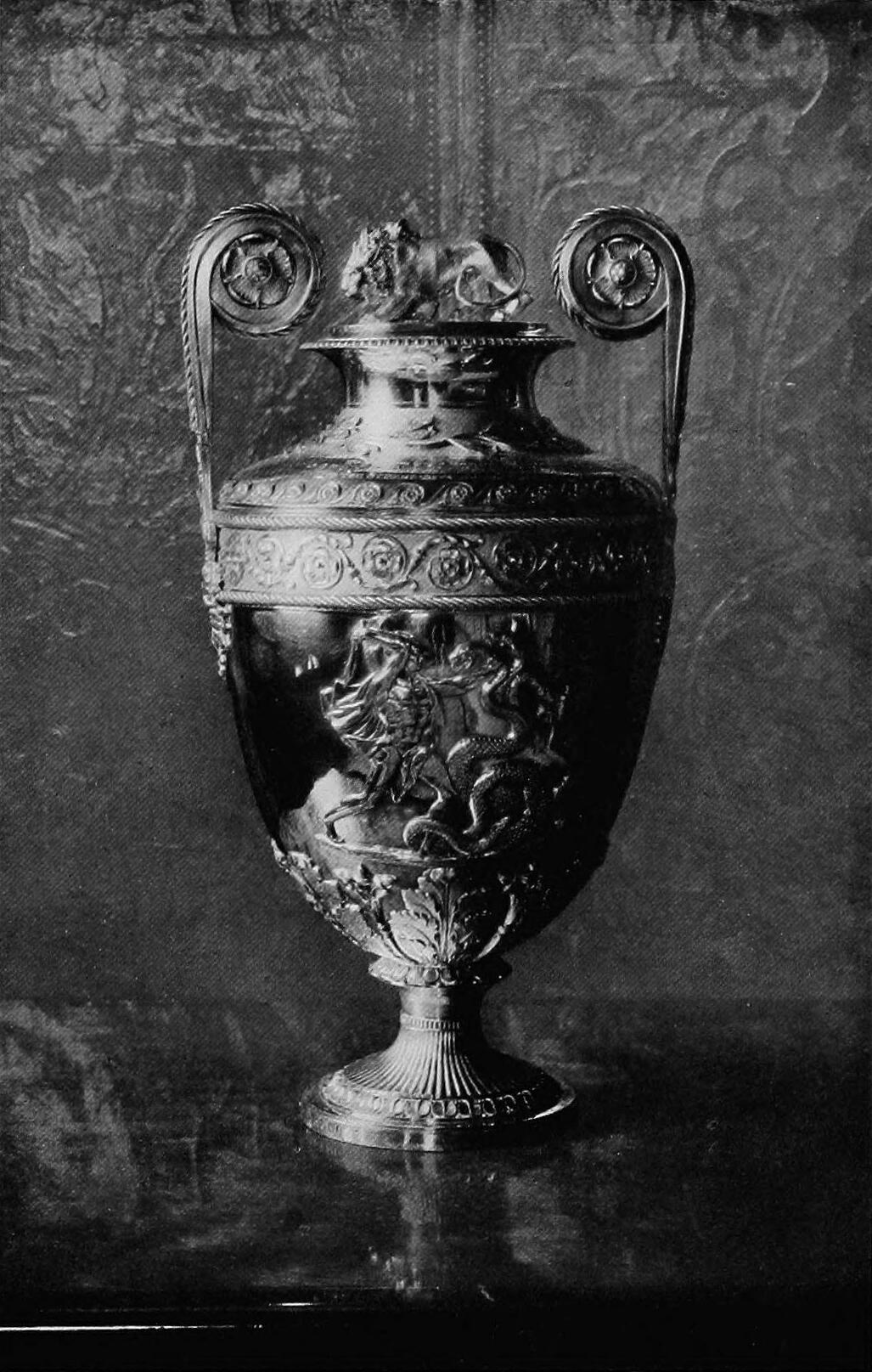
Vase presented to Major John Hamill by Lloyd's Patriotic Fund

The fund issued sixty-six silver presentation vases. Most of these went to the widows of officers who had been killed but some also went to others.

== History ==
The fund was originally established for the purpose of relieving brave seaman and soldiers who had been disabled in the Napoleonic Wars and to support their families. The fund capital was raised by a public subscription which raised £100,000 (£5,000,000 in 2020) in just one month. Between 1803 and 1809, the fund awarded 82 presentation swords along with charitable giving to seaman.

In 1807 the fund also donated £61,000 to the Royal Naval Asylum, giving Lloyd's Patriotic Fund the enduring right to nominate children to the school.

On 24 August 1809 the Fund held a general meeting of its subscribers. The subscribers decided at that time to discontinue the awards for merit and instead focus only on charitable support. The Peninsular War was putting such demands on the Fund that it was felt that priority would have to go to support for the wounded and the dependents of those killed. Still, when the Fund awarded officers money for wounds received, some officers asked that the Fund give them an inscribed sword instead.
