= John Graham Dalyell =

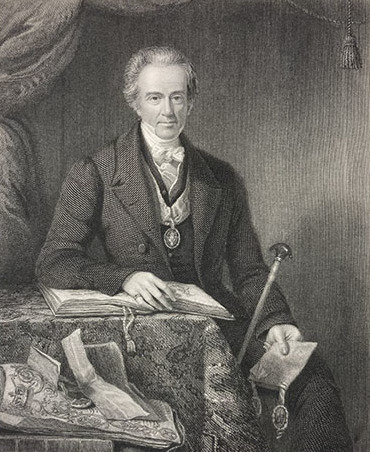
John Graham Dalyell

Sir John Graham Dalyell PSSA (August 1775 – 7 June 1851), 6th Baronet of the Binns was a Scottish advocate, antiquary and naturalist.

== Life ==
The second son of Sir Robert Dalyell, fourth baronet (d. 1791) and his wife Elizabeth Graham, only daughter of Nicol Graham of Gartmore, Perthshire, was born at Binns, Linlithgowshire, in August 1775.

When an infant he fell from a table upon a stone floor and became lame for life. He attended classes first at St. Andrews, and secondly at the University of Edinburgh, and while there qualified himself for the Scotch bar, and became a member of the Faculty of Advocates in 1796. The work in the parliament-house proved to be too fatiguing for him, but he acquired a considerable business as a consulting advocate, and although a younger son and not wealthy he made it a rule of his legal practice not to accept a fee from a relative, a widow, or an orphan. In 1797 he was elected a member of the Society of Antiquaries of Scotland, and was chosen the first vice-president of that society; he also became a member of the Society of Arts for Scotland, and served as president 1839-40.

Devoting himself to letters with an enthusiasm which animated him to the last, he soon turned his attention to the manuscript treasures of the Advocates' Library, and in 1798 produced his first work, Fragments of Scottish History, which contained, among other matter of interest, The Diary of Robert Birrell, burgess of Edinburgh from 1532 to 1608. This was followed in 1801 by Scottish Poems of the Sixteenth Century, in 2 vols. In the preface to this work the author says that in the course of his preparatory researches he had examined about seven hundred volumes of manuscripts. In addition to his knowledge of antiquarian lore he had also an extensive acquaintance with natural history, and in 1814 gave to the public his very valuable Observations on several Species of Planariæ, illustrated by coloured figures of living animals.

In 1832/3, "John G. Dalyell, advocate" is listed as residing at 54 Hanover Street in Edinburgh's New Town.

On 22 August 1836 he was created a knight by letters patent, and on 1 February 1841 succeeded his brother, Sir James Dalyell, as sixth baronet of Binns. Rare and Remarkable Animals of Scotland, with practical observations on their nature, he finished in 2 vols, in 1847. The publication of this beautifully engraved work was unfortunately delayed for nearly five years, owing to a dispute and a law process with the engraver, and the delay deprived Dalyell of the full credit of several of his discoveries in connection with medusae.

The first volume of his last and great work, The Powers of the Creator displayed in the Creation, or Observations on Life amidst the various forms of the humbler Tribes of Animated Nature, was published in 1851. The second volume, after the author's death, was brought out in 1853, under the superintendence of his sister, Miss Elizabeth Dalyell, and Professor John Fleming, D.D., while the third volume was delayed until 1858. Dalyell became an enrolled member of the Highland and Agricultural Society of Scotland in 1807, and in 1817 was presented by his fellow members with a piece of plate for the invention of "a self-regulating calendar". He was one of the original promoters of the Zoological Gardens of Edinburgh and 'preses' of the board of directors in 1841.

He died at 14 Great King Street, Edinburgh, 7 June 1851, and was buried beside his ancestors in Abercorn Church. He was never married, and his successor in the baronetcy was his brother, Sir William Cunningham Cavendish Dalyell RN.

== Works ==
Besides the publications already mentioned Sir John Dalyell was the author, editor, or translator of the following works;

- Early Superstitions of Scotland
- Scottish Poems of the 16th Century
- Dissertations on the Propagation of Zoophytes
- History of the Genus Planaria
- Fragments of Scottish History, Constable, Edinburgh (1798)
- Tracts on the Nature of Animals and Vegetables, by L. Spallanzani, a translation, 1799, and another translation of the same work in 1803.
- Journal of the Transactions in Scotland during the contest between the adherents of Queen Mary and those of her Son, by Richard Bannatyne, 1806.
- A Tract chiefly relative to Monastic Antiquities, with some account of a recent search for the remains of the Scottish kings interred in the abbey of Dunfermline, 1809; a vellum copy of this book is believed to have been the only work printed on vellum in Scotland for nearly three centuries.
- Some Account of an Ancient Manuscript of Martial's Epigrams, 1811.
- Shipwrecks and Disasters at Sea, with a sketch of several expedients for preserving the lives of mariners, anon. 1812, 3 vols.
- The Chronicles of Scotland, by Robert Lindsay of Pitscottie, 1814, 2 vols.
- Annals of Scotland, 1514-1591, by G. Marioreybanks, 1814.
- Remarks on the Antiquities, illustrated by the chartularies, of the Episcopal See of Aberdeen, 1820.
- Observations on the Natural History of Bees, by F. Huber, 1821.
- Historical Illustration of the Origin and Progress of the Passions and their Influence on the Conduct of Mankind, 1825, 2 vols.
- A Brief Analysis of the Ancient Records of the Bishopric of Moray, 1826.
- A Brief Analysis of the Chartularies of the Abbey of Cambuskenneth, the Chapel Royal of Stirling, and the Preceptory of St. Anthony at Leith, 1828.
- The Darker Superstitions of Scotland, illustrated from History and Practice, 1834.
- Musical Memoirs of Scotland, 1849.* Musical Practice, a work left in manuscript.

Sir John was also a contributor to the Philosophical Journal, Reports of the British Association, New Philosophical Journal, Encyclopædia Britannica, Douglas's Peerage, and Burke's Baronetage.

Baronetage of Nova Scotia
Preceded by James Dalyell	Baronet (of the Binns); 1841–1851	Succeeded by William Cunningham Dalyell
