= Kitty (1800 ship) =

History

Great Britain
- Name: Kitty
- Owner: 1800:Miller & Co.; 1805:Clays
- Builder: Ulverston, or Lancaster
- Launched: 1800
- Fate: 1804 Hired armed ship

United Kingdom
- Name: Kitty
- Operator: Royal Navy
- In service: 17 May 1804
- Out of service: 17 January 1805
- Fate: Returned to owners

United Kingdom
- Name: Kitty
- Owner: 1805:Drinkalla, or Drinkall; 1810:Milford; 1815:Parsons; 1830:Meaburn or Cruikshank; 1847:Coates
- Fate: Last listed 1852

General characteristics
- Tons burthen: 307, or 310, or 320, or 322 (bm)
- Propulsion: Sails
- Complement: 100
- Armament: Hired armed ship: 16 × 18-pounder carronades; Privateer: 22 × 24-, 18-, & 9-pounder guns + 6 swivels; 1806:16 × 18-pounder + 2 × 9-pounder guns + 4 × 24-pounder carronades

Kitty was a sailing ship that began her career as a West Indiaman. She then served the Royal Navy from 17 May 1804 to 17 January 1805 as a hired armed ship. Next she became a privateer. As a privateer she captured a Spanish vessel in a notable single ship action that earned her captain an honour sword. On her return from privateering Kitty returned to mercantile service, particularly later trading with Russia. She underwent repairs in 1830 and a change in ownership to emerge as a whaler in the southern whale fishery. After four whaling voyages between 1830 and 1846, she returned to mercantile service and was last listed in 1852.

== Career ==
Kitty entered Lloyd's Register in 1800 with Redemayne, master, Miller & Co., owners, and trade Lancaster–St Kitts The Register of Shipping for 1805 showed Kitty with K. Mallet, master, Clays, owner, and trade London-Government service.

She served the Royal Navy from 17 May 1804 to 17 January 1805 as a hired armed ship.

=== Privateer ===
In March 1805 Kitty sailed for the South Seas, which has led the leading sources on the ships of the British Southern Whale Fishery to classify her as a whaler. However, she was sailing as a privateer, not a whaler.

In March Kitty's master described her as a "private ship of war". He had received a letter of marque against the French on 5 February 1805. On 10 March, while under the command of Thomas Musgrave, she captured the Spanish privateer Felicity (or Felicidad) in the Channel. Felicity was armed with 20 guns and had a crew of 170 men. She was under the command of Jose Vincento de Cinza and had been out 10 days. In the one and a half hour engagement Kitty suffered one man killed and two seriously wounded. Felicidad, of St Andero, had four men killed and 14 wounded.

In his after-action letter, Musgrave reported that fewer than 20 of her crew had ever seen a gun fired, and fewer than 40 had ever been to sea before she left port on 3 March. Kitty's owner and the Lloyd's Patriotic Fund presented Commander Musgrave with an honour sabre worth 30 pounds for the action.

The "privateer Kitty", Musgrave, master, was reported as being well in River Plate on 5 November 1806. That month she was at Maldonado, Uruguay, where Sir Home Riggs Popham, who was leading a British invasion of the Rio Plate hired her to take Mr. Blennerhassett, purser of Raisonable, to Rio de Janeiro to buy supplies and to convey a message. Kitty was waiting to take hides and tallow to London and her owner agreed to charter her. He asked £1000 for "wear, tear and expenses", but accepted £750. Popham was well pleased because he thought this cheaper than using a naval vessel, had he had one to spare. She returned to Maldonado on 18 December.

=== Merchant man ===
On her return from Buenos Aires, Kitty continued to trade with South America, and then Russia.

Year	Master	Owner	Trade	Source & notes
1810	W.Perry; T. Codnor	Milford	London–Rio Janeiro; London–Buenos Aires	Register of Shipping (RS)
1815	Warren	Parson	London transport London-Archangel	RS
1820	Warren	Parsons	London–St Petersburgh	RS
1825	Cole	Parkins	London–St Petersburgh	RS
1830	Burridge	Parsons	London–St Petersburgh	RS
1830	S. Barney	Meaburn	London–South Seas	RS 1830 "K" Supple.; large repair 1830

=== Whaler ===
Kitty emerged from repairs in 1830 somewhat larger, and this time clearly a whaler. Between 1830 and 1846 she made four whaling voyages. Records differ on who owned Kitty during her whaling years. A key database gives the name of her owner as Cruikshank.

Whaling voyage #1 (1830–1835): Although the date that Kitty left England is obscure, she was reported to have been at Guam on 7 August and 5 December 1832, and Honolulu between 1 and 5 April 1833. She had sailed under the command of S. Barney, and she returned to England on 16 February 1835 with Sam Barry Whitton as master. She returned with 260 casks of whale oil and four fins (an indeterminate quantity of baleen).

Whaling voyage #2 (1835–1838): Captain John King sailed on 8 July 1835, bound for Timor. Kitty was at Copang on 27 November 1835 and again on 3 September 1838. Three days later she was at Amoorang, and again on 10 August 1837. Homeward bound, she was at the Cape of Good Hope on 3 February 1838. She arrived back in England on 2 May with 100 tons of sperm oil.

Whaling voyage #3 (1838–1841): Captain George Benson sailed from England on 21 June, bound for Timor. Kitty was at Timor on 16 April 1839 and Copang on 7 November. She was at Guam on 8 June 1840 and in September back at Timor. She was again at Copang on 7 June 1841 and 7 July. Homeward bound, she was at Saint Helena on 22 October, and arrived back in England on 11 December.

Whaling voyage #4 (1842–1846): Captain George Benson again sailed for Timor on 30 May 1842. Kitty was at Brava, Cape Verde, by 2 July, and at Guam on 16 July 1843. She returned to England on 15 July 1846 with 150 tons of sperm oil.

=== Merchantman ===
Kitty had undergone small repairs in 1842 and she underwent some more in 1847. Lloyd's Register for 1847 listed her master as J. Romley, her owner as Coates & Co., and her location as London, with no trade given. by 1850 She was trading between Shields and the Baltic. She is last listed in 1852 with a trade of London–Spain.
