= Abercorn =

Coordinates: 55.993°N 3.473°W

Abercorn: Scottish Gaelic: Obar Chùirnidh
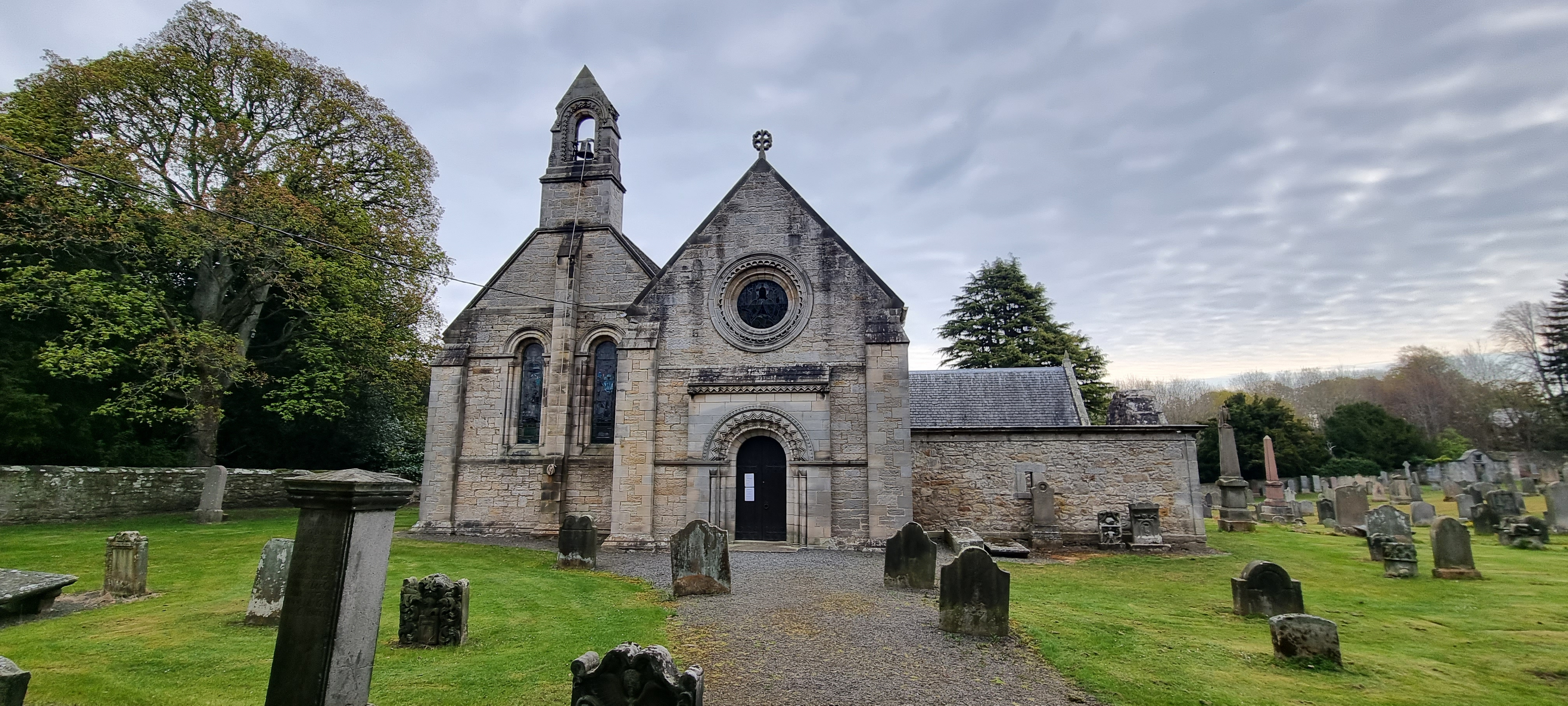
- Abercorn Church

- Location within West Lothian
- Population: 458
- OS grid reference: NT082788
- Council area: West Lothian
- Lieutenancy area: West Lothian
- Country: Scotland
- Sovereign state: United Kingdom
- Post town: SOUTH QUEENSFERRY
- Postcode district: EH30
- Dialling code: 0131
- Police: Scotland
- Fire: Scottish
- Ambulance: Scottish
- UK Parliament: Bathgate and Linlithgow
- Scottish Parliament: Linlithgow

Abercorn (Gaelic: Obar Chùirnidh, Old English: Æbbercurnig) is a village and civil parish in West Lothian, Scotland. Close to the south coast of the Firth of Forth, the village is around 5 km (3.1 mi) west of South Queensferry. The parish had a population of 458 at the 2011 Census.

== Etymology ==
Etymologically, Abercorn is a Cumbric place-name. It is recorded as Aebbercurnig in c.731. The first element is aber 'mouth, confluence'. William J. Watson proposed that the second element meant 'horned', from a Brittonic word related to Welsh corniog. The name would thus mean 'horned confluence'. However, because Abercorn sits by the Cornie Burn, Alan James has suggested that the name means 'mouth of the Cornie Burn'. The name of the stream itself is also Cumbric and seems to derive from *kernan 'mound, hill' and so to be named after the hill on which Abercorn stands.

== History ==
The English monk and historian Bede mentions Abercorn as the site of a monastery and seat of Bishop Trumwine, who was the only bishop of the Northumbrian see of the Picts. The 7th-century monastery is now known to have existed close to the present-day church. The church itself dates partially from the 12th century, although its most interesting features are the private aisles created for the three major families of the area, the Dalyells, the Hamiltons, and later the Hopes, who had their own enclosure behind the altar built by architect William Bruce. The Hope mausoleum, designed by William Burn, is located adjacent to the kirkyard. Older burial monuments include Norse "hogback" grave markers, and fragments of 7th-century Northumbrian crosses. Adjacent to the churchyard at Abercorn, is a small museum containing prominent examples of medieval gravestones.

The lands of Abercorn were granted to Claud Hamilton in the 16th century. His son was later created the Earl of Abercorn. In the early 17th century, a branch of the Hamilton dynasty moved to Ulster in Ireland. The family would, henceforth, play a major part in Ulster affairs. Thus, the estate was later sold to the Hope family, who were created Earls of Hopetoun, and built Hopetoun House to the east of the village. On the approach to the church, the Factor's house is a prominent L-shaped building in the Scottish baronial style, built circa 1855.

The House of the Binns, seat of the Dalyell family, is within the parish.

Abercorn's population was recorded as 1,044 at the time of the 1821 census, although it has since declined.

== Abercorn Castle ==
A castle also existed here, near Hope Burn, from the 12th century, belonging to the Avenel family. It passed through marriage to the Graham family in the mid-13th century and to the Mure family in the early 14th century. The Clan Douglas acquired the castle in about 1400.

It was besieged and sacked in 1455 by James II in his attack against the "Black Douglases" and their chief James Douglas, 9th Earl of Douglas. It passed to the Seton family but they did not restore the castle and it was thereafter left to decay, such that it is now only marked by an earth mound. The site was excavated by archaeologists in 1963.

== Ecclesiastical history ==
=== Bishopric ===
For a very short time, Abercorn was a residential bishopric. In 681, during the reign of King Ecgfrith of Northumbria, Theodore of Tarsus, Archbishop of Canterbury, appointed Trumwine "Bishop of the Picts", with his seat at Abercorn. This was part of a more general division of the Northumbrian church by Theodore, who also created the Bishopric of Hexham by separation from the Bishopric of Lindisfarne.

Four years later, Trumwine may have been present at the defeat and death of Ecgfrith at the Battle of Dun Nechtain, after which he was forced to flee from his Pictish bishopric, retiring to the monastery at Whitby. The bishopric of Abercorn thus ceased to be a residential diocese.

=== Titular see ===
It is today listed by the Catholic Church as a titular see. The diocese was nominally restored as a Latin Catholic titular bishopric in 1973. It must not be confounded with the former Diocese of Abercorn in southern Africa.

It has had the following incumbents, all of the lowest (episcopal) rank:

- Richard Charles Patrick Hanifen (1974–1983)
- John Aloysius Mone (1984–1988)
- John Charles Dunne (1988–), Auxiliary Bishop emeritus of Rockville Centre (USA)

== Notable burials in Abercorn ==
- Very Rev Hugh Meiklejohn
- Ian Hamilton Finlay, poet
- Sir Robert Dalyell, 8th Baronet

== Gallery ==
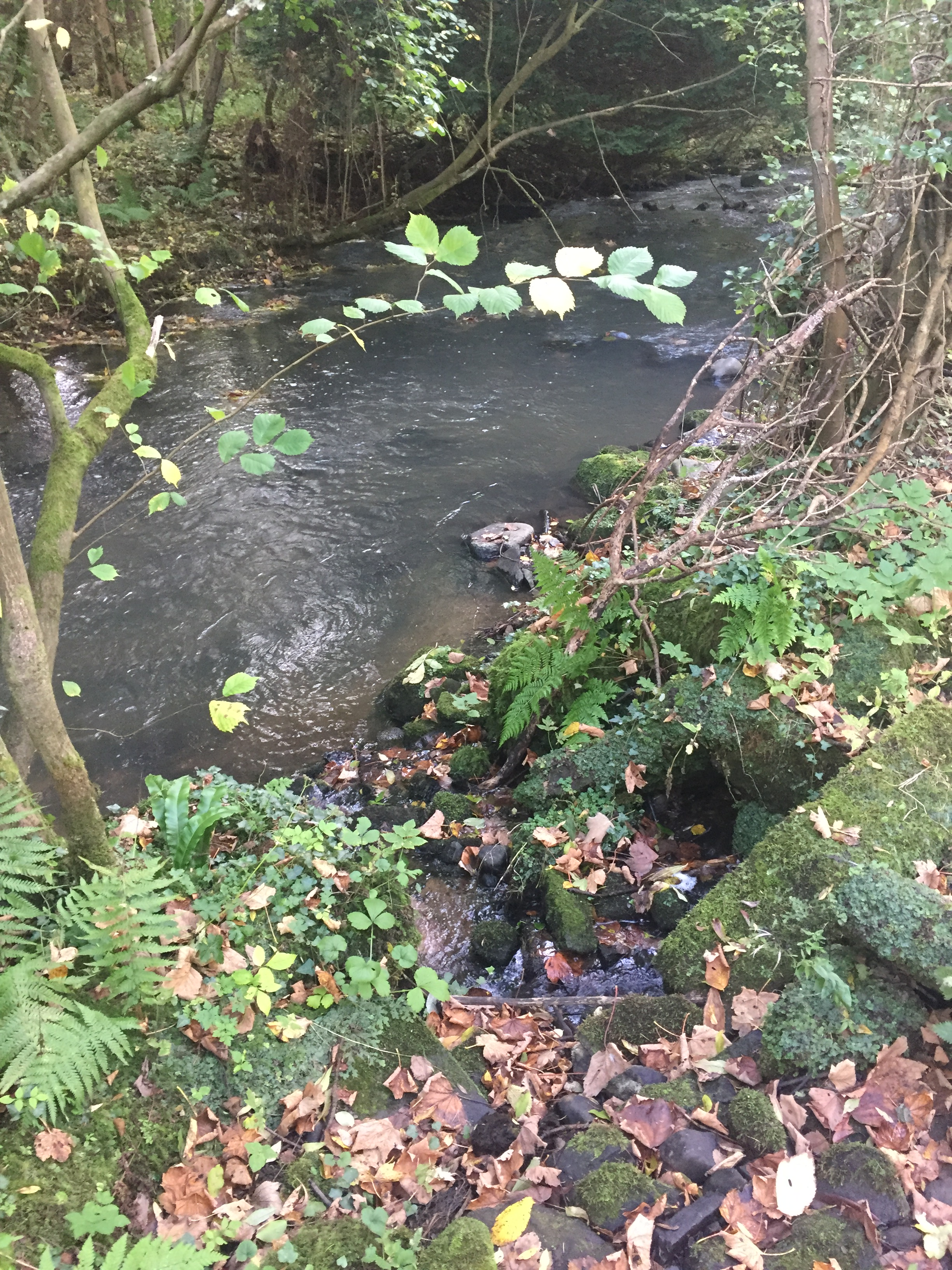
The Cornie Burn where it joins the Midhope Burn and thence passes into the Forth

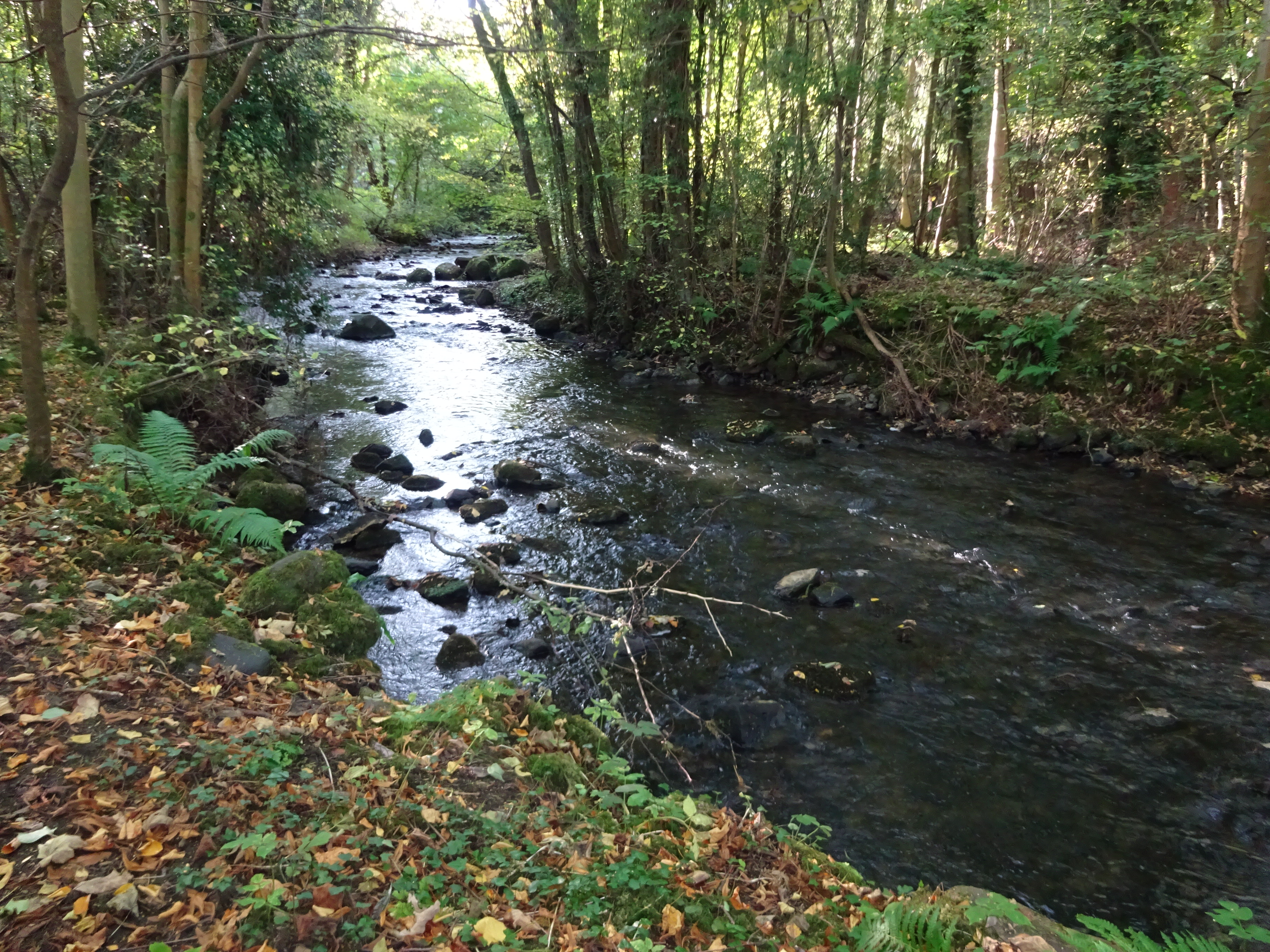
The Cornie Burn

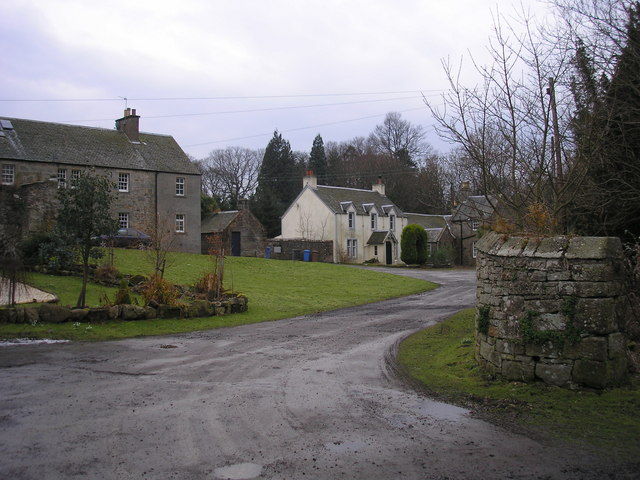
The village

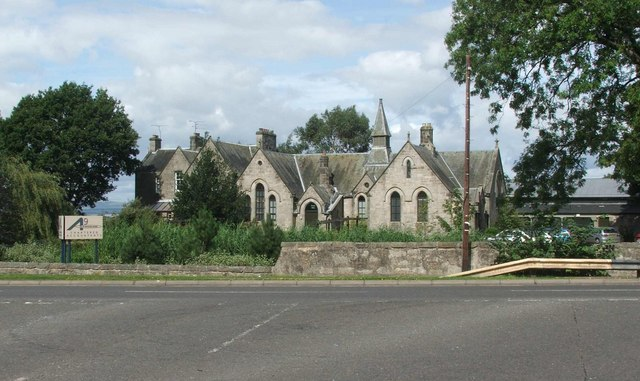
The former school

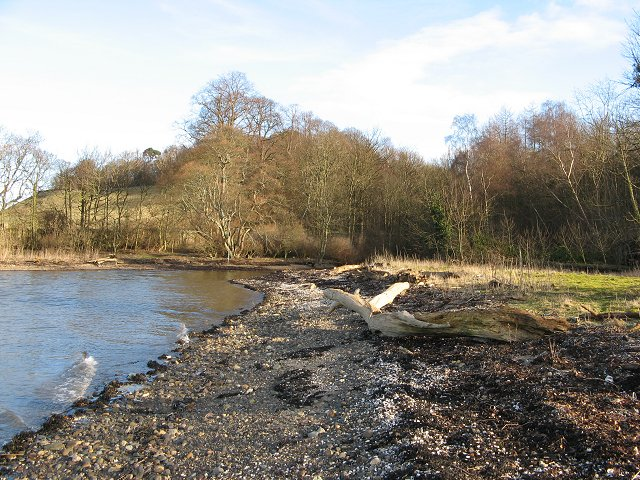
The beach at Abercorn

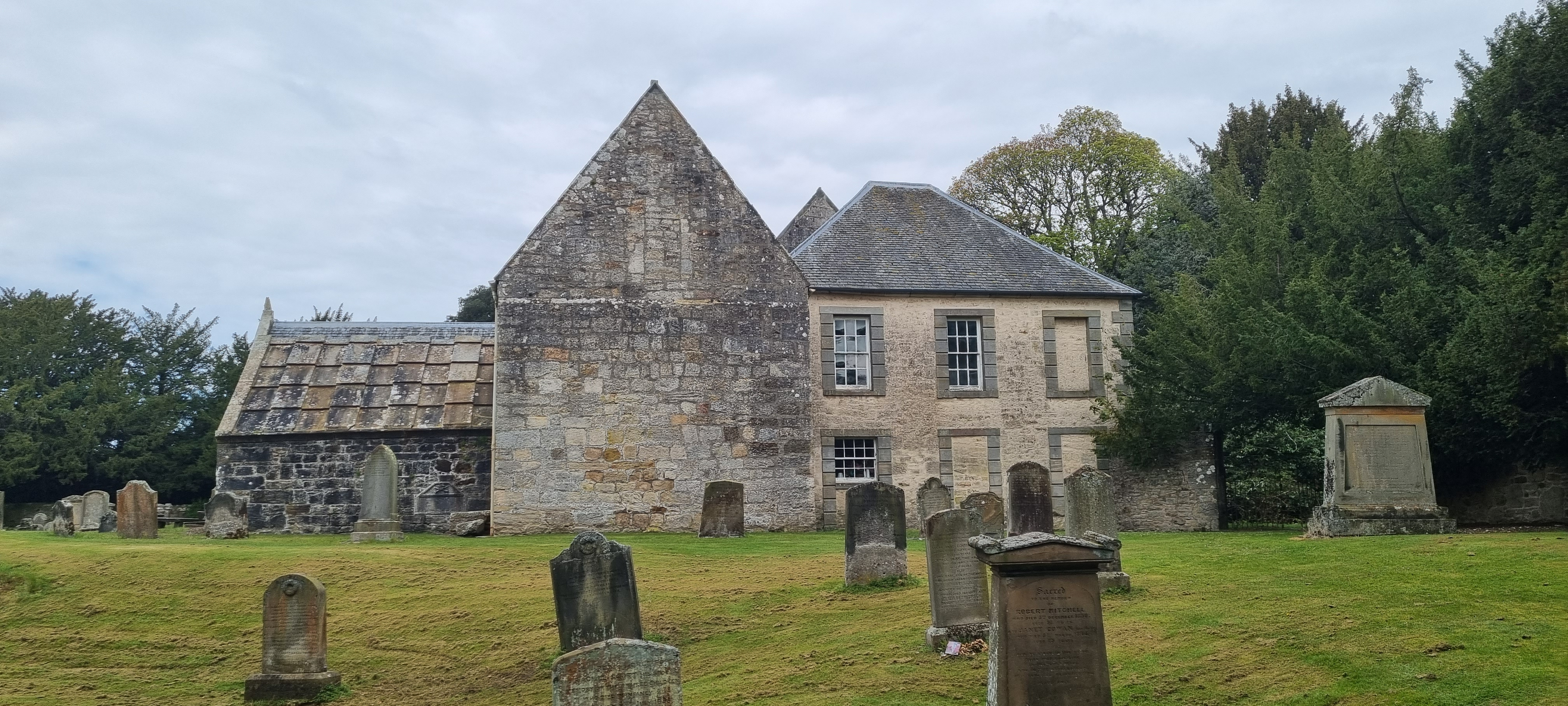
The Church and Hopetoun Aisle seen from the east

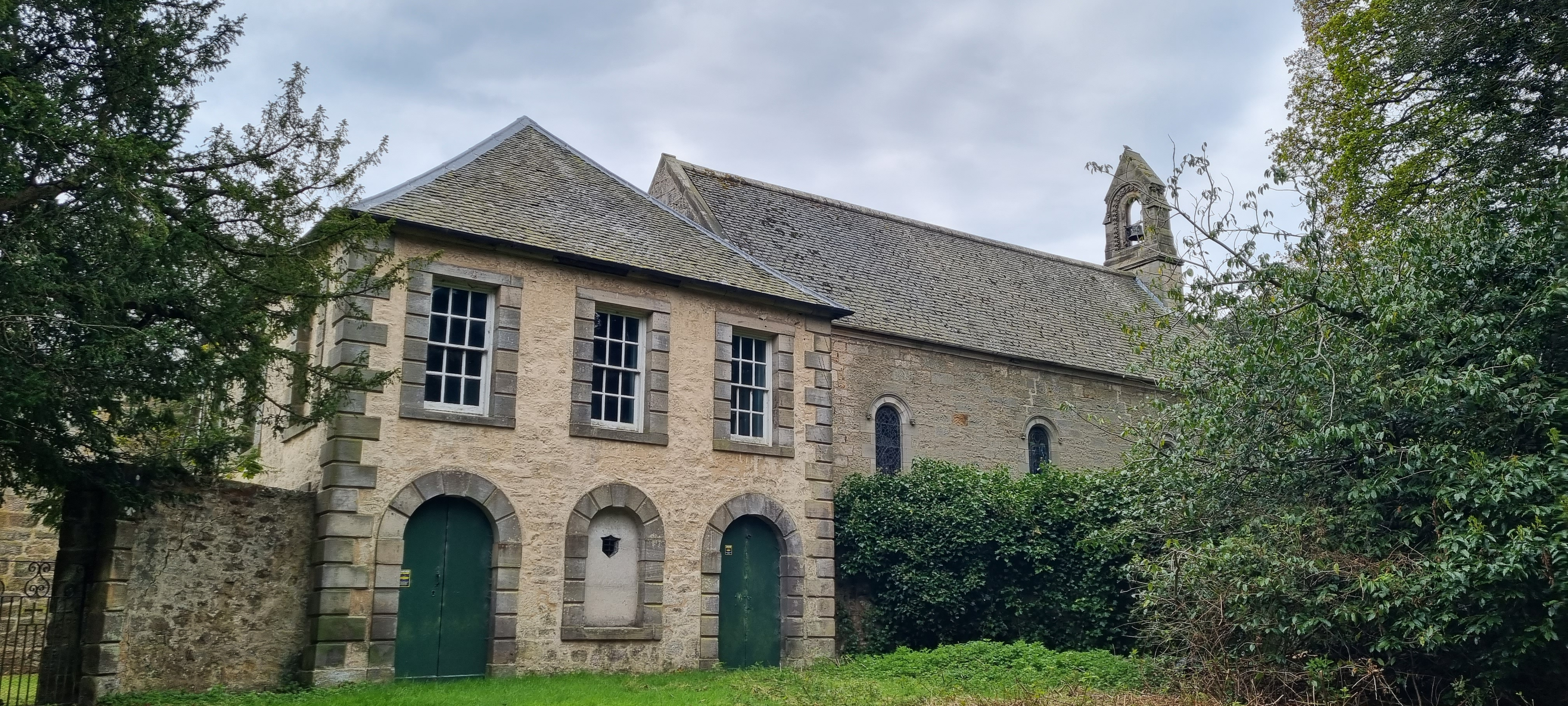
The Church and Hopetoun Aisle seen from the north-east

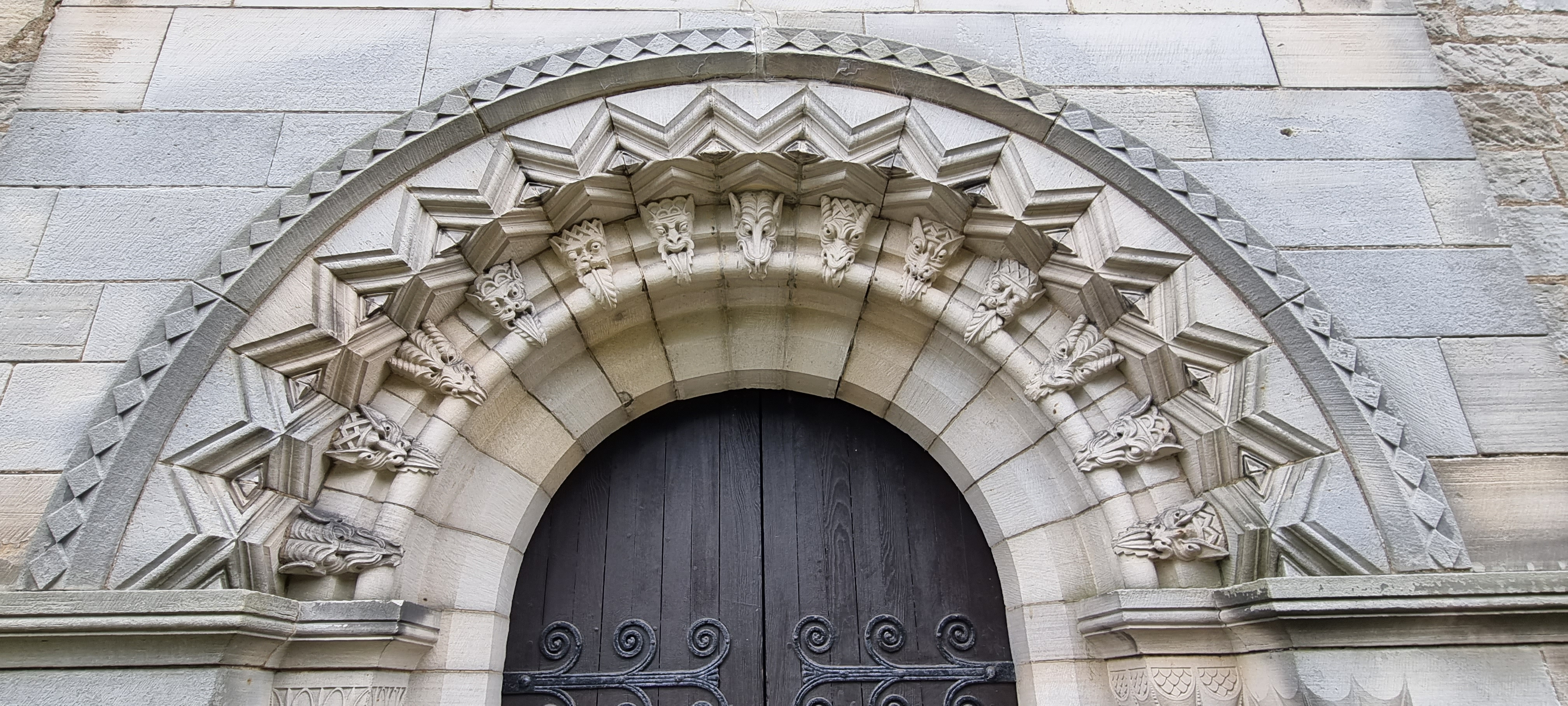
Detailing of the West Front entrance to the nave

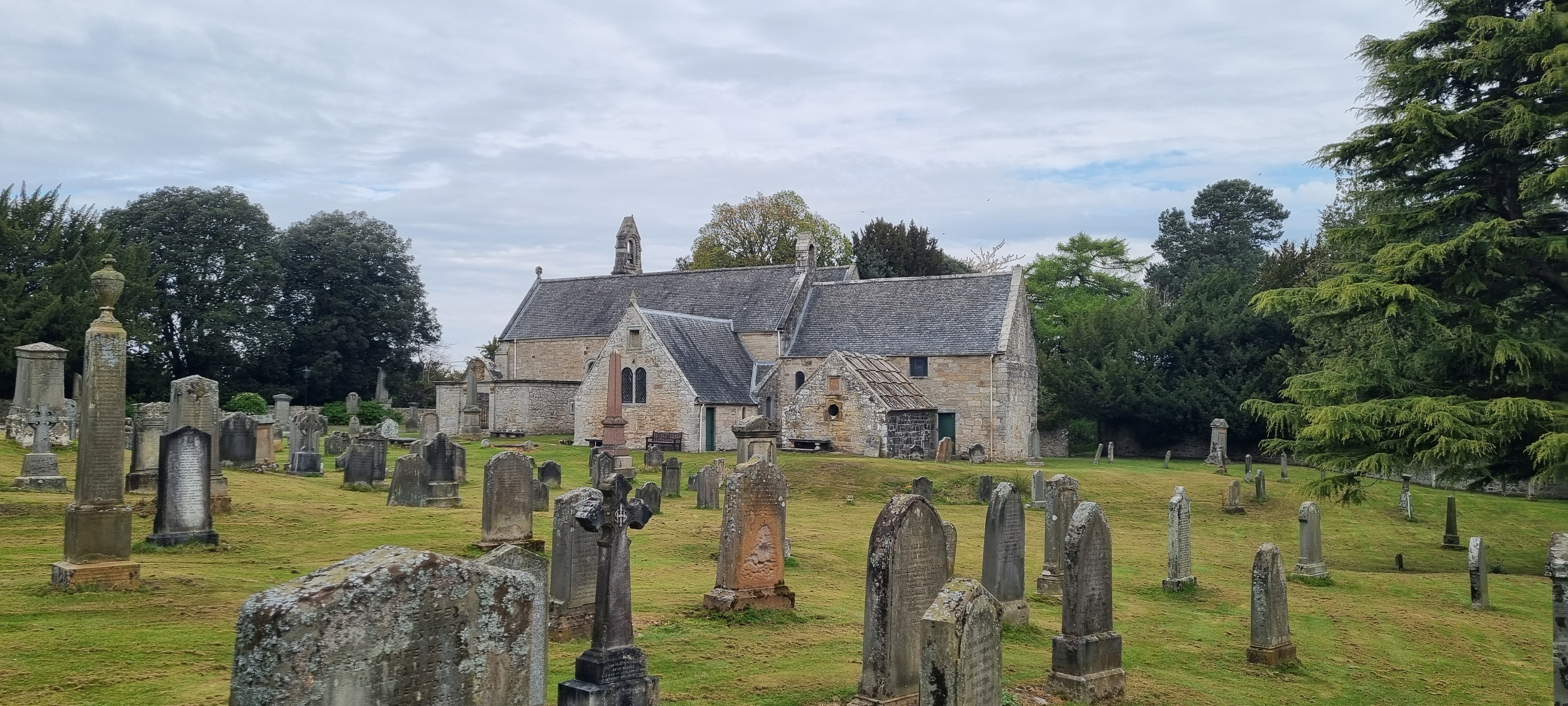
Abercorn church seen from the SE

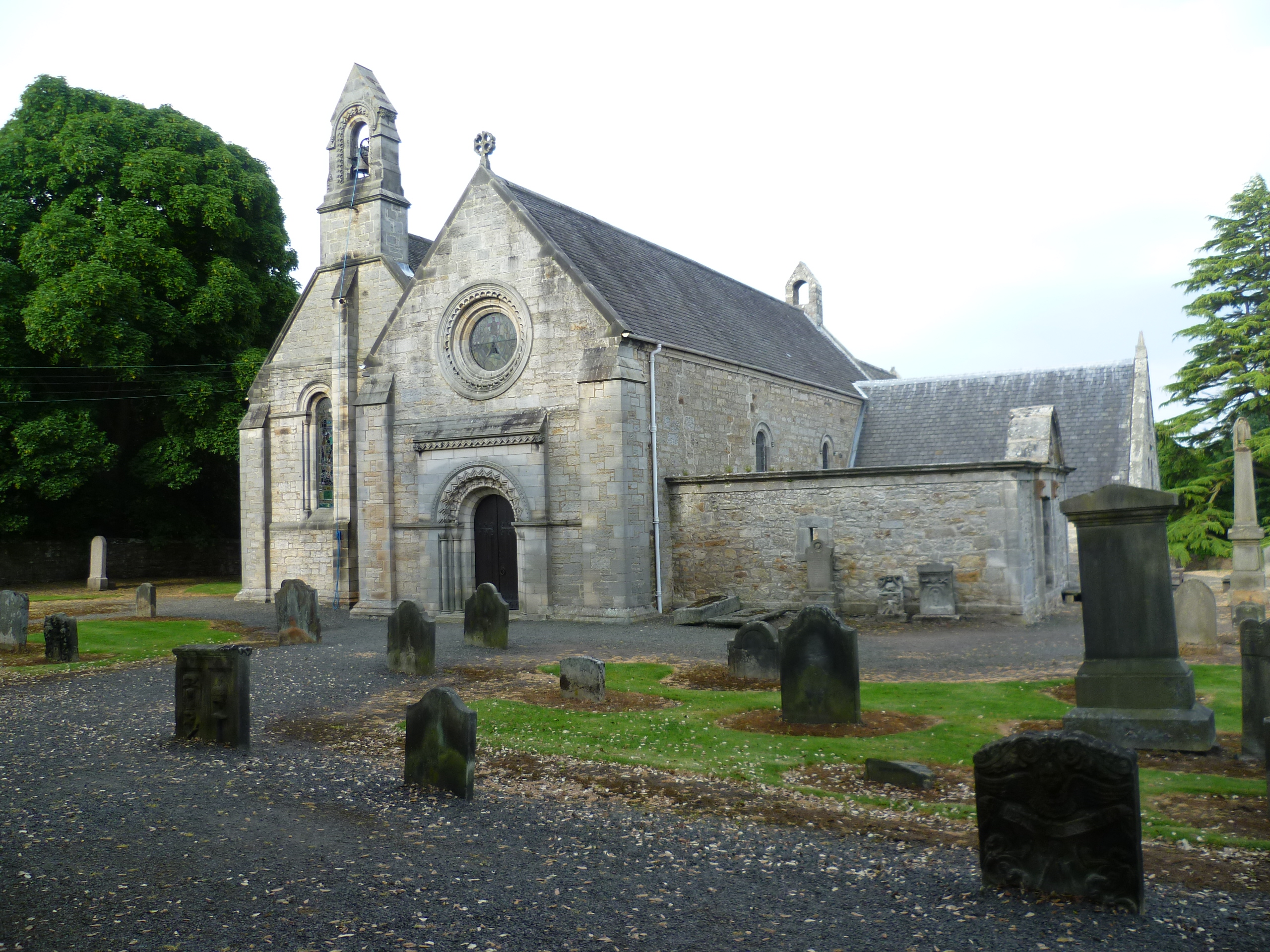
Abercorn church front seen from towards the main gate

== See also ==
- Duke of Abercorn
- Trumwine of Abercorn
- Newtownstewart, County Tyrone

== Sources and external links ==
- grid reference NT082788
- Gazetteer of Scotland
- Ancient Lothian
- GigaCatholic with titular incumbent biography links
