= William Cunningham Dalyell =

Captain Sir William Cunningham Dalyell Bt
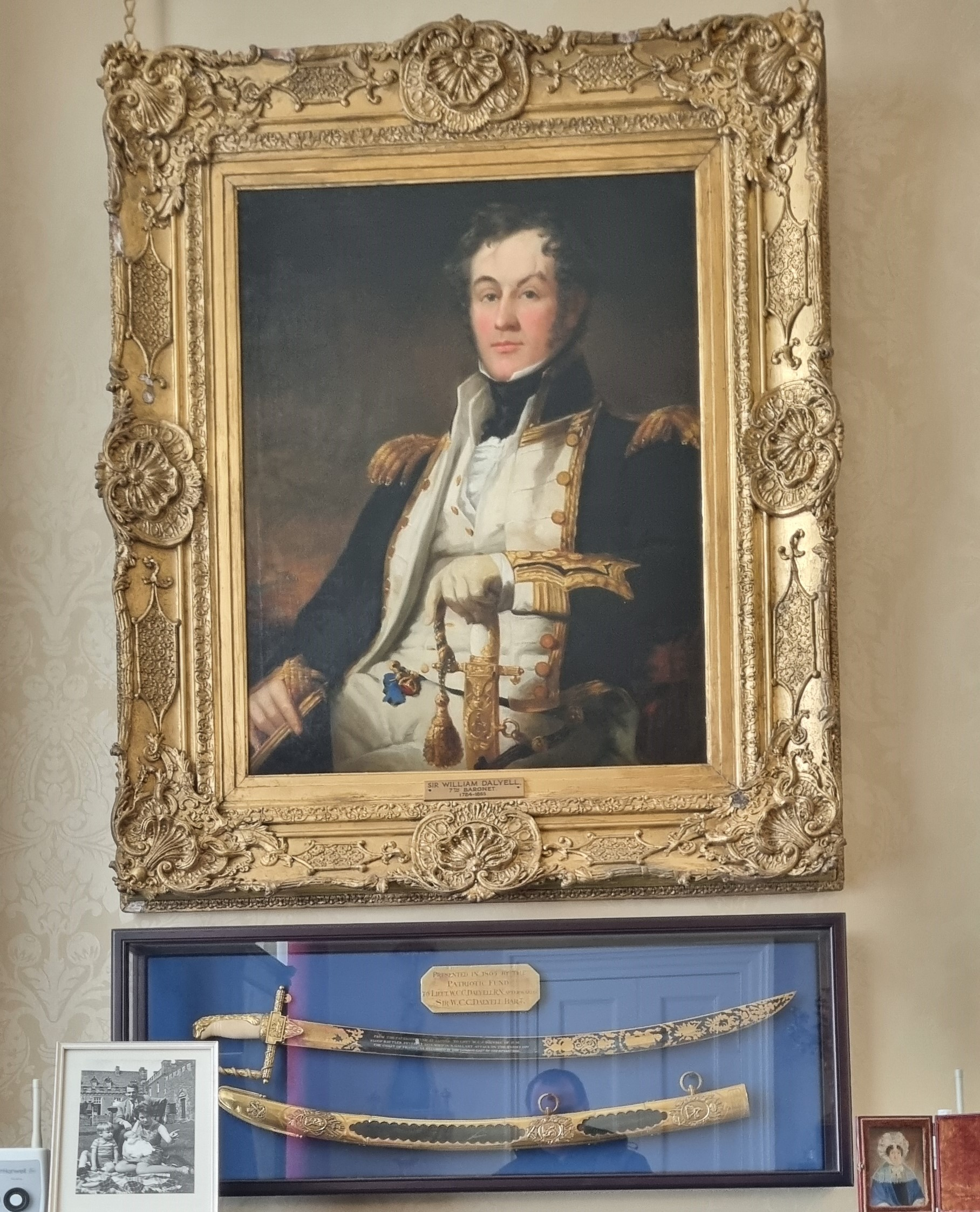
- Sword and Painting of William Cunningham Dalyell at House of the Binns
- Born: William Cunningham Cavendish Dalyell; 27 April 1784; Abercorn, Linlithgowshire, Scotland
- Died: 16 February 1865 (aged 80) Greenwich, London
- Allegiance: Kingdom of Great Britain; United Kingdom
- Branch: Royal Navy
- Service years: 1793–1865
- Rank: Post-captain
- Conflicts: French Revolutionary Wars; Napoleonic Wars

Sir William Cunningham Dalyell of the Binns, 7th Baronet (27 April 1784 – 16 February 1865) was an officer in the British Royal Navy who served in the French Revolutionary Wars and in the forces under Sir Sidney Smith that operated along the French and Dutch coasts during the Napoleonic Wars. Born on 27 April 1784 in Linlithgowshire, Scotland, his father was Sir Robert Dalyell of the Binns, 4th Baronet, an officer in the British Army. William inherited the title 7th Baronet of the Binns in 1851 when his brother died inheriting the House of the Binns.

== Personal life ==
William Cunningham Cavendish Dalyell was born on 27 April 1784 in Abercorn, Linlithgowshire, Scotland. His father was Sir Robert Dalyell of the Binns, 4th Baronet, an officer in the British Army who had an interest in arts and antiquities, being a member of the African Society of Paris and the president and vice-president of the Society for Promoting Useful Arts in Scotland, and the Society of Antiquaries of Scotland, respectively. William's mother, Elizabeth was the eldest daughter of Nicol Graham of Gartmore, Stirlingshire. William was their fifth and last son.

On 19 September 1820, Dalyell married Maria, daughter of Anthony Teixiera Sampayo and the youngest sister of the French Minister at Hesse, Anthony Sampayo. They eventually had two daughters. Dalyell became the 7th Baronet on 7 June 1851 when his brother John died. Dalyell died on 16 February 1865 at Greenwich Hospital where he worked and lived. His wife died on 10 October 1871 at 120 Belgrave Road, Pimlico, Middlesex.

== Career ==
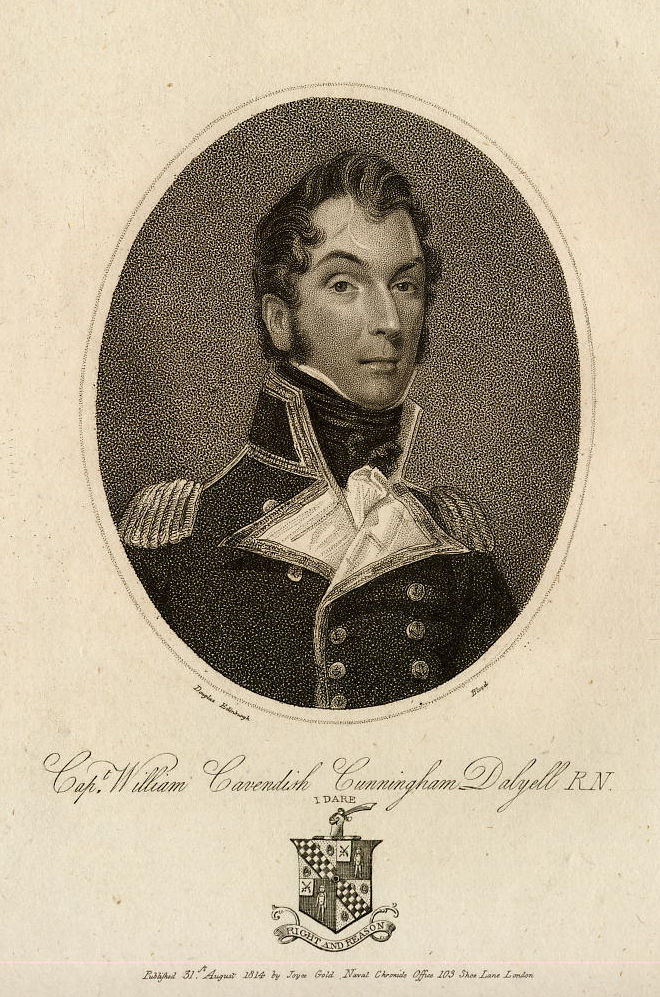
Portrait from Naval Chronicle, 1814

The young Dalyell joined the navy in 1793 having graduated from Burney's Naval Academy in Gosport. He joined Alexander Cochrane's ship, Thetis, at Halifax, Nova Scotia, as a Captain's Servant. In July 1797 he was rated as a midshipman by his then captain, Sir David Milne, and joined Pique for service in the English Channel. Aboard her, Dalyell took part in the action of 30 June 1798.

On 29 June, Pique was part of an inshore squadron comprising the 38-gun HMS Jason under Captain Charles Stirling, and 32-gun HMS Mermaid under Captain James Newman-Newman, which along with the Channel Fleet, maintained a tight blockade on the French port of Brest. The 40-gun French frigate Seine was returning home from Port Louis with 280 troops aboard when at 07:00 she was spotted by the British squadron in the Bay of Biscay, heading north towards the Penmarch Rocks off the south coast of Finistère. She was quickly headed off by Mermaid, forcing her to go-about. This sudden tacking put Mermaid out of the chase but Pique and Jason remained in pursuit. The latter was able to prevent Seine seeking refuge in Lorient and by 21:00 Pique came within range and opened up with her bow chasers.

Two hours later, Pique was alongside, exchanging broadsides. This running battle continued for 2 hours 35 minutes, after which time, the British frigate began to fall astern, having lost the top portion of her mainmast. By this time Stirling, in Jason, had caught up and attempted to communicate that Pique ought to retire. Milne did not comply however and continued in the chase. Shortly after, all three frigates ran aground off Pointe de la Tranche. Seine was completely dismasted but Pique was unable to fire into her for fear of hitting Jason which was between the two, and being stern on, at the mercy of Seine's raking broadsides. As the tide came in, however, Pique was able to get her nose ahead and bring her foremost guns to bear while Stirling's crew managed to move several guns abaft where they too could fire upon Seine. Not only was Seine now taking fire from the two grounded British frigates, the third, Mermaid had since come into view and the Frenchman thus struck her colours. Mermaid was able to tow Jason into deeper water but was not able to free Pique which was too badly damaged, having seen the majority of the action.

At first light, a French squadron of two frigates, a brig and a number of gunboats, put to sea from Rochelle but returned when Jason signalled for assistance from three passing British frigates: Phaeton, San Fiorenzo and Triton. San Fiorenzo was instrumental in refloating Seine which eventually came off after her forward guns had been jettisoned, but a second attempt to rescue Pique was unsuccessful and she was destroyed to prevent her falling into the hands of the French.

Dalyell transferred with Milne into the captured Seine and in her, sailed to the West Indies. While serving on this station, Dalyell was given his first command, a captured enemy vessel which would later sink leaving him and his crew marooned on the coast of Cuba. When the war ended, following the Treaty of Amiens, Dalyell returned to England to sit his lieutenant's examination.

The peace was short-lived, however, breaking out again in May the following year, and Dalyell, unable to find employment as a lieutenant had to make do with a commission as a Passed midshipman, aboard the 50-gun Antelope. This position was obtained with Alexander Cochrane's help in April 1803. Antelope's commander, Sir Sidney Smith, was directing covert operations along the French and Dutch coasts, and at this particular time was monitoring naval construction at Texel and Antwerp. In September, Dalyell and two others, were sent ashore to gather intelligence but could not be extracted and had to pose as Americans while making their way to the coast. At Emden they were able to get a boat back to England. The vessel was in such poor condition, however, that by the time they arrived in London, water ingress had caused its cargo of grain to expand and open up the deck.

Dalyell returned to active duty as a lieutenant on 1 January 1805, but was captured four days later and would have died were it not for the attentions of a French surgeon. He was exchanged in December 1813, promoted to commander, and on 14 March 1814 granted a pension for the wounds he had received. Appointed captain at Greenwich Hospital on 27 August 1840, Dalyell made post 1 July 1864 with seniority dated 1860.

== Archives ==
Archive Services at the University of Dundee holds correspondence between Dalyell, and his nephew James Dalyell, the illegitimate son of his brother James (the 5th Baronet), who was also a naval officer. These letters mainly relate to William Dalylell's attempts to help his nephew's career, but also document his indignant reaction to the Hango massacre during the Crimean War and some of his views on the navy.

== Bibliography ==
- James, William (2002) [1827]. The Naval History of Great Britain, Volume II, 1797–1799. London: Conway Maritime Press. ISBN 0-85177-906-9.
- Tracy, Nicholas (2006). Who's Who in Nelson's Navy. London: Chatham Publishing. ISBN 1-86176-244-5.

Baronetage of Nova Scotia
Preceded by John Graham Dalyell	Baronet (of the Binns); 1851–1865	Succeeded by Robert Dalyell
