= Tam Dalyell of the Binns =

Scottish army officer (1615–1685)

General Sir Thomas Dalyell Bt
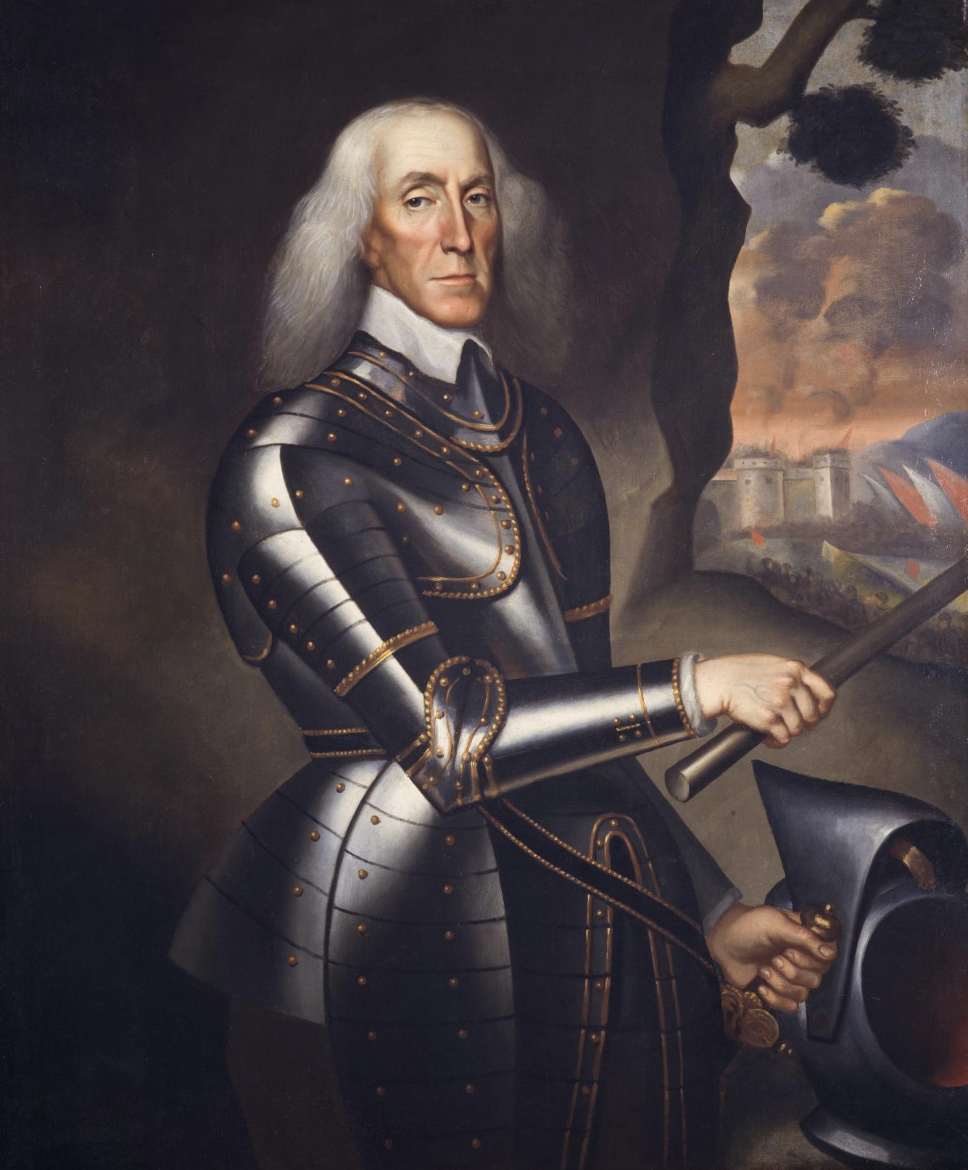
- Portrait by L. Schuneman, c. 1670
- Born: 1615; Scotland
- Died: 1685 (aged 69–70)
- Military career
- Allegiance: Scotland; Russia
- Branch: Scots Army; Army of the Tsardom of Russia
- Service years: 1628–1685
- Rank: General
- Conflicts: Huguenot rebellions; Siege of La Rochelle; Wars of the Three Kingdoms; Battle of Worcester; Russo–Polish War (1654–1667); Scottish Covenanter Wars; Battle of Rullion Green

Arms of Dalyell of the Binns, matriculated in 1685: Sable a naked man his arms extended au naturel, on a canton argent a sword and pistol disposed in saltire proper.

General Sir Thomas Dalyell, 1st Baronet (1615–1685), better known as Tam Dalyell of the Binns, was a Scottish army officer who served in the Huguenot rebellions, Russo–Polish War of 1654–1667 and Wars of the Three Kingdoms. He was also known by the soubriquets "Bluidy Tam" and "The Muscovite De'il".

== Life ==
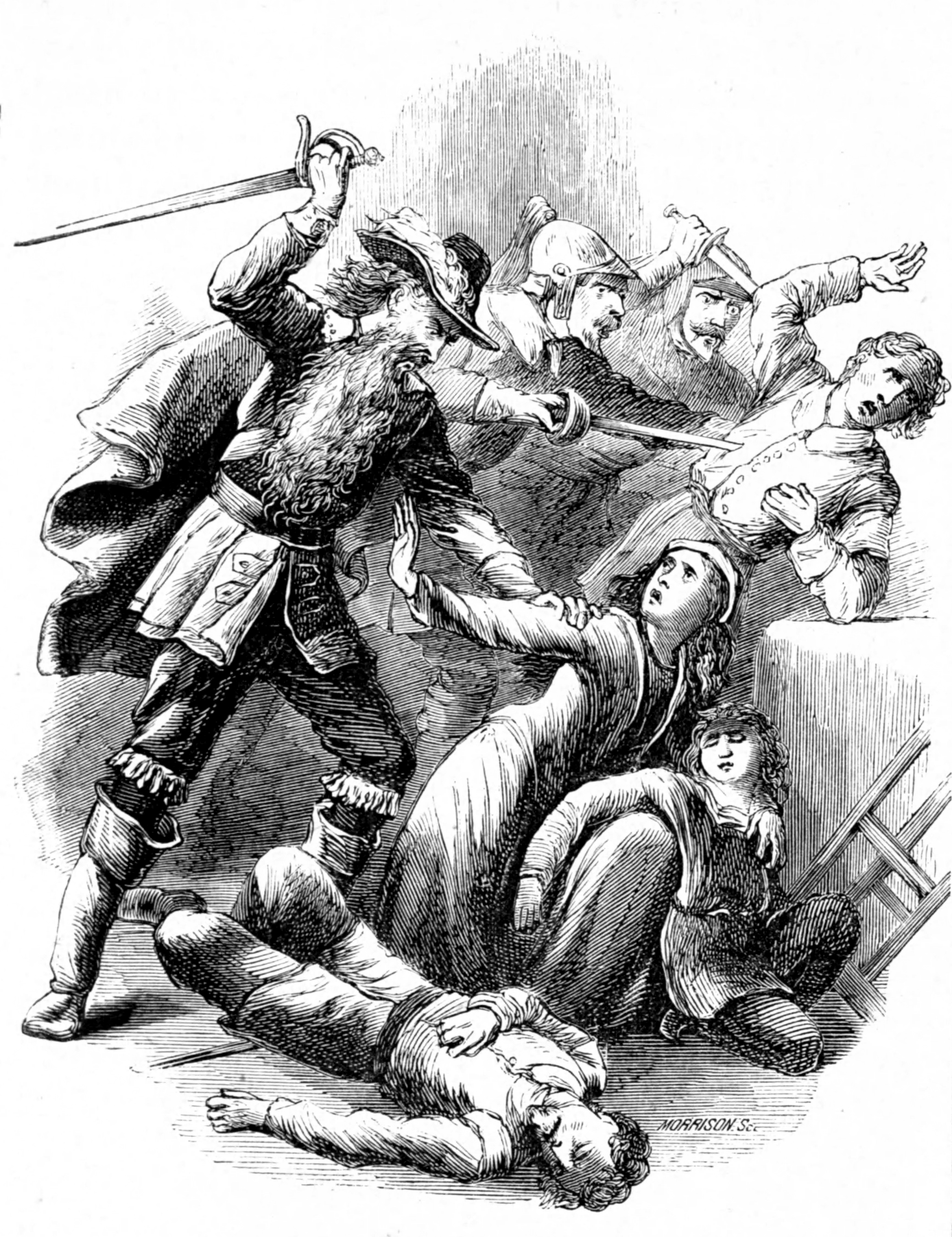
Binns attacking Covenanter civilians

Dalyell was born in Linlithgowshire, the son of Thomas Dalyell of The Binns, head of a cadet branch of the family of the Earls of Carnwath, and of Janet, daughter of the 1st Lord Bruce of Kinloss, Master of the Rolls in England.

He appears to have accompanied Charles I's expedition to La Rochelle in 1628 (to aid the Huguenots during the Siege of La Rochelle) at the age of thirteen. Latterly as a colonel, he served under General Robert Munro and General Alexander Leslie in Ulster.

Hearing of the execution of Charles I on 30 January 1649, it is said that he refused to shave his beard as a penance for the behaviour of his fellow countrymen. He was taken prisoner at the capitulation of Carrickfergus in August 1650, but was given a free pass, and having been banished from Scotland, remained in Ireland.

He was present at the Battle of Worcester (3 September 1651), where his men surrendered, and he himself was captured and imprisoned in the Tower of London. In May he escaped abroad and, in 1654, took part in the Highland rebellion and was exempted from Cromwell's Act of Grace, a reward of 200 guineas being offered for his capture, dead or alive.

Dalyell evaded capture and fled to Russia. There, he entered the service of Tsar Alexis I and distinguished himself as general in the wars against the Turks and Tatars as well as in the Russo-Polish War (1654–1667).

He returned to Britain upon The Restoration of Charles II. By 19 July 1666 he was appointed commander-in-chief in Scotland, with orders to subdue the Covenanters. Dalyell defeated them at the Battle of Rullion Green, in the Pentland Hills, south of Edinburgh. He treated the defeated with great cruelty, earning him the nickname "Bluidy Tam". The General obtained several of the forfeited estates of his opponents.

On 3 January 1667 he was made a privy counsellor, and from 1678 till his death he represented Linlithgowshire in the Scottish parliament. He was incensed by the choice of the Duke of Monmouth as commander-in-chief in June 1679, and was confirmed in his original appointment by Charles, but in consequence did not appear at the Battle of Bothwell Brig till after the close of the engagement.

On 25 November 1681, a commission was issued authorizing him to enroll the regiment afterwards known as the Scots Greys. His commission was confirmed by King James VII, but he died soon after the latter's accession in August 1685. He married Agnes, daughter of John Ker of Cavers, by whom he had a son, Thomas, created a baronet in 1685, whose only son and heir, Thomas, died unmarried. The baronetage apparently became extinct, but it was assumed about 1726 by James Menteith. The Dalyell baronetage was later held by politician Tam Dalyell, formally styled Sir Thomas Dalyell of the Binns, 11th Baronet.

== Gaming with the devil ==
Legend has it that "Bluidy Tam" enjoyed on occasion a hand of cards with the devil. During one of these games, the devil, losing, threw the card table at the general. The devil missed and the table flew threw through the window and ended up in a pond on the grounds of the House of the Binns. This tale was passed down through generations of inhabitants of the Binns. In 1870, following a particularly hard drought, a marble topped card table was seen poking through the low waters of the pond. In 1930 the mother of the twentieth century Tam Dalyell asked a local joiner to repair the legs on the table, to find out that the about-to-be-retired tradesman's first job had been to retrieve said table from the pond.

== Bibliography ==
- Report on the Muniments of Sir Robert Osborne Dalyell, baronet of Binns, Hist. MSS. Comm. 9th Rep. pt. ii. 230–8
- Captain Creighton's Memoirs in Swift's Works
- Thurloe State Papers, ii.
- State Papers, Dom. Ser., 1654–67
- Wodrow's Sufferings of the Church of Scotland
- Fountainhall's Historical Notices: ib. Observes
- Nicolls's Diary
- Burnet's Own Time
- Balfour's Annals
- Acts of the Parliament of Scotland
- Douglas's Baronage of Scotland
- Grainger's Biog. Hist. of England, 4th ed. iii. 380–1
- Letters to the Duke of Lauderdale, 1666–80
- British Library Add MSS 23125–23126; 23128; 23135; 23246–23247, published in Lauderdale Papers (Camden Society)
- Letters to Charles II, Add MS 28747
- Information from Sir Robert Dalyell, K.C.I.E.
- Foster's Members of Parliament in Scotland, 1882

== Sources ==
- Green, Mary Anne Everett, ed. (1864). Calendar of State Papers Domestic Series of the Reign of Charles 2. Preserved in Her Majestyʼs Public Record Office. London: Longman, Green, Longman, Roberts and Green. p. 295.
- Henderson, Thomas Finlayson (1888). "Dalyell, Thomas". In Stephen, Leslie (ed.). Dictionary of National Biography. Vol. 13. London: Smith, Elder & Co.
- Hewison, James King (1913). "Chapter XXIII – The Ruling of Rothes and the Rising of Rullion Green". The Covenanters. Vol. 2. Glasgow: John Smith and son. pp. 169-220.
- Lamont, John (1830). Kinloch, George Ritchie (ed.). The diary of Mr. John Lamont of Newton. 1649-1671. Edinburgh. p. 196.
- Lee, John (1860). Lectures on the history of the Church of Scotland : from the Reformation to the Revolution Settlement. Vol. 2. Edinburgh: William Blackwood.
- Kirkton, James (1817). The secret and true history of the church of Scotland from the Restoration to the year 1678. Edinburgh: J. Ballantyne. p. 249-252,227-228.
- Mackenzie, William, of Galloway; Symson, Andrew (1841). The history of Galloway, from the earliest period to the present time. Vol. 2. Kirkcudbright: J. Nicholson. p. 157-169.
- M'Crie, Thomas (1846). "Chapter III: From 1663 to 1666". Sketches of Scottish church history : embracing the period from the Reformation to the Revolution. Vol. 2. Edinburgh: J. Johnstone. pp. 101-123.
- McIntyre, Neil (2016). Saints and subverters : the later Covenanters in Scotland c.1648-1682 (PhD). University of Strathclyde. Archived from the original on 28 July 2020.
- Sidgwick, Miss M. (1906). "The Pentland Rising and the Battle of Rullion Green". The Scottish Historical Review. 3. Glasgow: James Maclehose & son: 449-452.
- Smellie, Alexander (1903). "How Colonel Wallace fought at Pentland". Men of the Covenant : the story of the Scottish church in the years of the Persecution (2 ed.). New York: Fleming H. Revell Co. pp. 128-139.
- Spalding, John (1828). The history of the troubles and memorable transactions in Scotland and England, from 1624 to 1645. Vol. 1. Edinburgh: Bannatyne Club. p. 218.
- Spalding, John (1828). The history of the troubles and memorable transactions in Scotland and England, from 1624 to 1645. Vol. 2. Edinburgh: Bannatyne Club. p. 168.
- Terry, Charles Sanford (1905). The Pentland Rising & Rullion Green. Glasgow: J. MacLehose.
- Turner, James, Sir (1828). Memoirs of his own life and times, 1632–1670. Edinburgh: The Bannatyne Club.
- Wallace, James (1825). M'Crie, Thomas (ed.). Narrative of the Rising Suppressed at Pentland. Vol. Memoirs of Mr. William Veitch, and George Brysson. Edinburgh; London: W. Blackwood; T. Cadell. pp. 355-432.
- Wodrow, Robert (1835a). Burns, Robert (ed.). The history of the sufferings of the church of Scotland from the restoration to the revolution, with an original memoir of the author, extracts from his correspondence, and preliminary dissertation. Vol. 1. Glasgow: Blackie, Fullarton & co., and Edinburgh: A. Fullarton & co. pp. 207-214.
- Wodrow, Robert (1835b). Burns, Robert (ed.). The history of the sufferings of the church of Scotland from the restoration to the revolution, with an original memoir of the author, extracts from his correspondence, and preliminary dissertation. Vol. 2. Glasgow: Blackie, Fullarton & co., and Edinburgh: A. Fullarton & co.
- Wodrow, Robert (1829). Burns, Robert (ed.). The history of the sufferings of the church of Scotland from the restoration to the revolution, with an original memoir of the author, extracts from his correspondence, and preliminary dissertation and notes, in four volumes. Vol. 3. Glasgow: Blackie Fullerton & Co. p. 6.
- Wodrow, Robert (1835d). Burns, Robert (ed.). The history of the sufferings of the church of Scotland from the restoration to the revolution, with an original memoir of the author, extracts from his correspondence, and preliminary dissertation and notes, in four volumes. Vol. 4. Glasgow: Blackie Fullerton & Co. pp. 498-501.
- Wodrow, Robert (1842). Leishman, Matthew (ed.). Analecta: or, Materials for a history of remarkable providences; mostly relating to Scotch ministers and Christians. Vol. 1. Glasgow: Maitland Club. p. 170.
- Wodrow, Robert (1842). Leishman, Matthew (ed.). Analecta: or, Materials for a history of remarkable providences; mostly relating to Scotch ministers and Christians. Vol. 3. Glasgow: Maitland Club. pp. 55-56.

== Attribution ==
Baronetage of Nova Scotia
New creation	Baronet (of the Binns); 1685	Succeeded by Thomas Dalyell
