= Eleanor Dalyell =

Dame Eleanor Isabel Dalyell (1895–1972) was the de jure 10th Baronetess of the Binns, one of only four baronetesses in British history. She was also known by the name "Nora". She is most well known for leaving the historic House of the Binns to the National Trust for Scotland in 1944, being one of the first landowners to leave a large house and estate to the Trust.

== Life ==
She was born in Scotland in 1895. She was the daughter of Sir James Bruce Wilkie-Dalyell of the Binns, 9th Baronet.

She was married to Lt. Colonel Gordon Loch, who later took her name and the arms of Dalyell of the Binns in 1938. They had a son, later to become an MP Tam Dalyell, who was born 9 August 1932.

Dalyell was a filmmaker with her partner Gordon Loch and travelled extensively in modern-day India and Pakistan. She also travelled and made films in Bahrain.

In 1936/1937 she hosted Joachim von Ribbentrop at the House of the Binns, presenting the German ambassador with an historic photograph of the Forth Bridge which would be later be used in propaganda during the Second World War.

In 1944, she decided to will the House of the Binns, its parkland, its contents, and an endowment for its upkeep to the National Trust for Scotland. The charter she granted states that the "history, legend and memory of the family of Dalyell of the Binns, shall be preserved ..." for the benefit and enjoyment of the nation.

She died in 1972.
