= Sir Robert Dalyell, 8th Baronet =

British diplomat

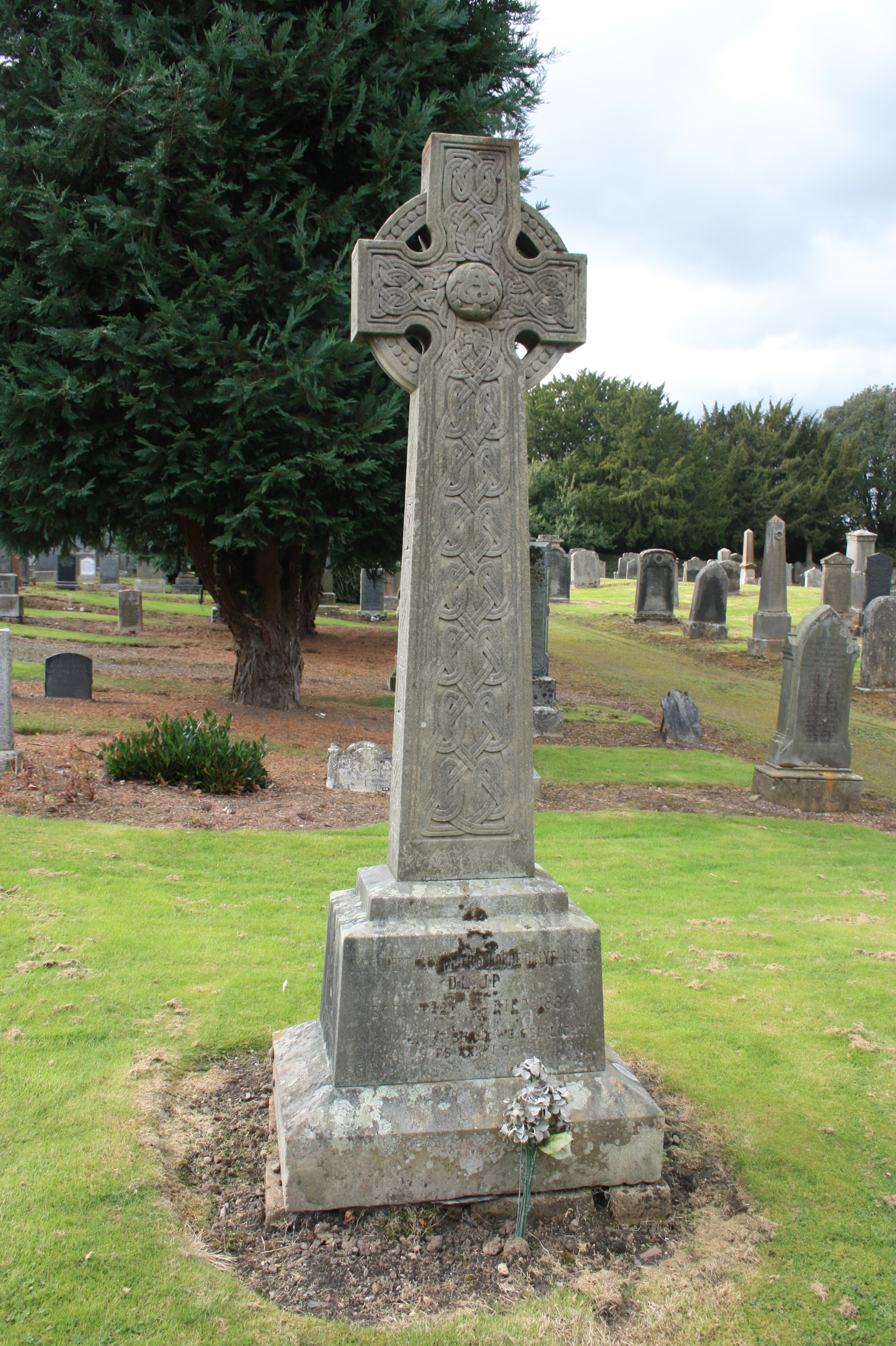
The grave of Sir Robert Dalyell, 8th Baronet, Abercorn churchyard

Sir Robert Alexander Osborne Dalyell of the Binns, 8th Baronet DL JP (1821 – 1886) was a British diplomat, and one of the Dalyell baronets. In some sources, his middle name is spelled Osborn. He succeeded to the Baronetecy and inherited the House of the Binns on the death of his brother William Cunningham Dalyell.

He received an M.A. in 1847 from Trinity College, Cambridge. He studied law at the Inner Temple and was called to the bar in 1849. He was a J.P. and D.L. of Linlithgowshire.

In his diplomatic career, he was acting consul-general in Bucharest 1856–7, and in Belgrade 1857–9. He was consul in Erzerum, Turkey 1859–62, in Iași, Romania 1862–1865, and in Ruse, Bulgaria 1865–74.

He died unmarried and the baronetcy became dormant until 1914.

He is buried in Abercorn churchyard in West Lothian. The grave lies to the south-east next to the southern path.

Baronetage of Nova Scotia
Preceded by William Cunningham Dalyell	Baronet (of the Binns); 1865–1886	Dormant next held by James Wilkie-Dalyell
