= Baronet =

Hereditary title awarded by the British Crown

Baronetcy
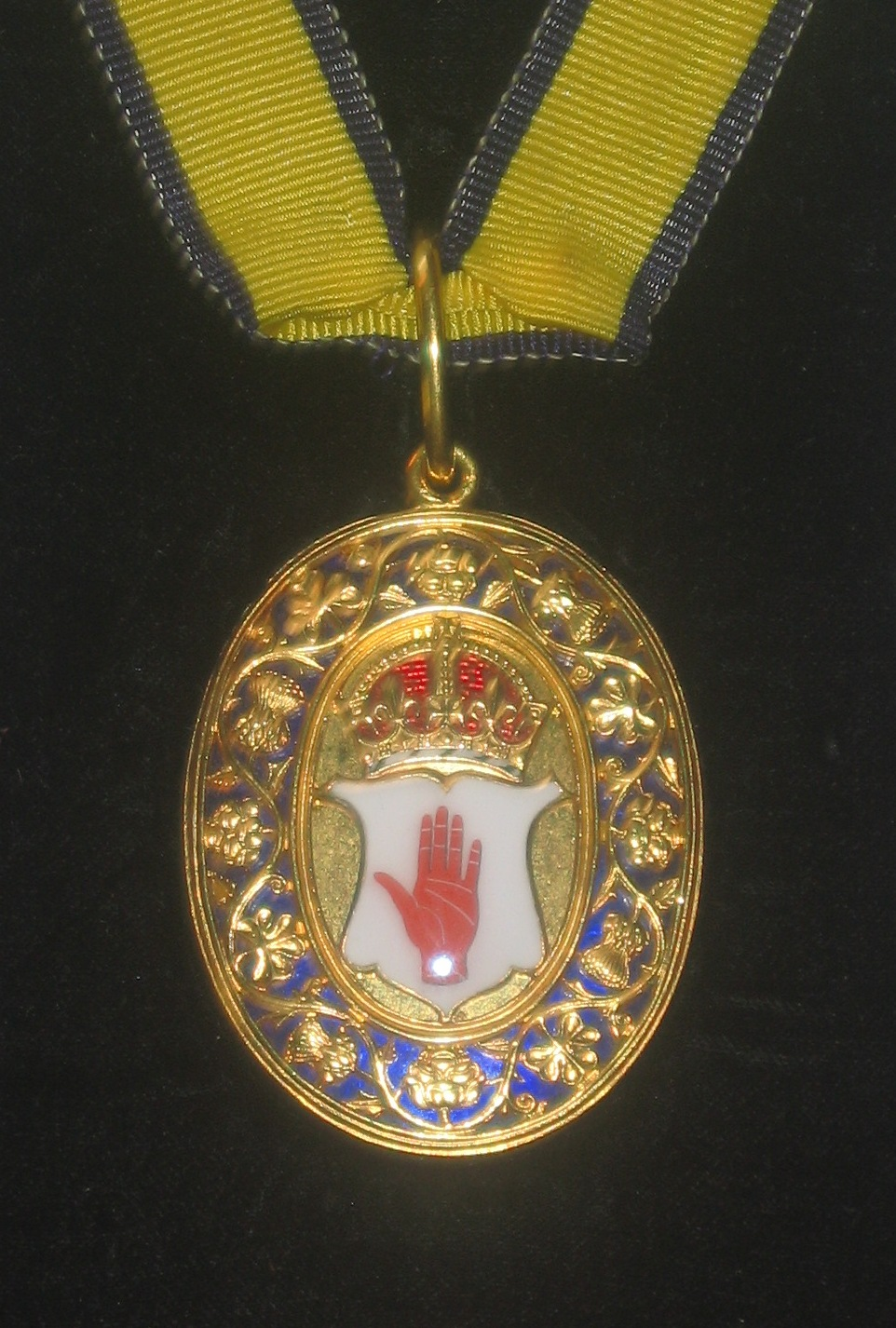
- Neck badge for a baronet of the United Kingdom, depicting the Red Hand of Ulster within a rose, thistle and shamrock border.

Awarded by the British monarch
- Type: Hereditary State order
- Established: 14th century. Re-established in 1611 (England), 1619 (Ireland) and 1625 (Scotland).
- Country: United Kingdom
- Ribbon: tawny orange (Scotland); orange with blue borders (elsewhere).
- Motto: Fax mentis honestae gloria ('Glory is the torch of an honourable mind') (Scotland)
- Status: Extant; last awarded in 1990
- Founder: James I (1611 and 1619); Charles I (1625)
- Post-nominals: Bt or Bart; or Btss (Baronetess)

A baronet (/ˈbærənɪt/ or /ˈbærəˌnɛt/; abbreviated Bart or Bt) or the female equivalent, a baronetess (/ˈbærənɪtɪs/, /ˈbærənɪtɛs/, or /ˌbærəˈnɛtɛs/; abbreviation Btss), is the holder of a baronetcy, a hereditary title awarded by the British Crown. Baronets rank below barons and knights of the Garter and the Thistle, but above all other knights.

The title of baronet is mentioned as early as the 14th century; however, in its current usage it was created by James I of England in 1611 as a means of raising funds for the crown.

Like all British knights, baronets are addressed as "Sir" and baronetesses as "Dame". They are conventionally seen to belong to the lesser nobility, although William Thoms in 1844 wrote:

The precise quality of this dignity is not yet fully determined, some holding it to be the head of the nobiles minores, while others, again, rank Baronets as the lowest of the nobiles majores, because their honour, like that of the higher nobility, is both hereditary and created by patent.

Comparisons with continental titles and ranks are tenuous due to the British system of primogeniture and because claims to baronetcies must be proven before they are recognised officially; currently the Official Roll of the Baronetage is overseen by the Ministry of Justice. In practice this means that the UK Peerage and Baronetage consists of about 1,200 families (some peers are also baronets), which is roughly less than 0.01% of UK families.

== History of the term ==
The term baronet has medieval origins. Sir Thomas de La More (1322), describing the Battle of Boroughbridge, mentioned that baronets took part, along with barons and knights. Edward III created eight baronets in 1328.

The title of baronet was initially conferred upon noblemen who lost the right of individual summons to Parliament, and was used in this sense in a statute of Richard II. A similar title of lower rank was banneret.

Present-day baronets date from 1611 when James I granted letters patent to 200 gentlemen of good birth with an income of at least £1,000 a year (equivalent to £237,000 in 2025). In return for the honour, each was required to pay one pound a day for the upkeep of thirty soldiers for three years (1,095 days), thus amounting to £1,095 (equivalent to £260,000 in 2025), in those days a very large sum. The money was to help fund the Plantation of Ulster. In 1619, James I established the Baronetage of Ireland; Charles I in 1625 created the Baronetages of Scotland and Nova Scotia. The new baronets were each required to pay 2,000 marks (equivalent to £477,000 in 2025), or to support six colonial settlers for two years. Over a hundred of these baronetcies, now familiarly known as Scottish baronetcies, survive to this day.

As a result of the Union of England and Scotland in 1707, all future creations were styled baronets of Great Britain. Following the Union of Great Britain and Ireland in 1801, new creations were styled as baronets of the United Kingdom.

Under royal warrants of 1612 and 1613, certain privileges were accorded to baronets. Firstly, no person or persons should have place between baronets and the younger sons of peers. Secondly, the right of knighthood was established for the eldest sons of baronets (this was later revoked by George IV in 1827), and thirdly, baronets were allowed to augment their armorial bearings with the Arms of Ulster on an inescutcheon: "in a field Argent, a Hand Geules (or a bloudy hand)". These privileges were extended to baronets of Ireland, and for baronets of Scotland the privilege of depicting the Arms of Nova Scotia as an augmentation of honour. The former applies to this day for all baronets of Great Britain and of the United Kingdom created subsequently.

== Conventions ==
Like knights, baronets are accorded the style "Sir" before their first name. Baronetesses in their own right use "Dame", also before their first name, while wives of baronets use "Lady" followed by the husband's (marital) surname only, this by longstanding courtesy. Wives of baronets are not baronetesses; only women holding baronetcies in their own right are so styled.

Unlike knighthoods – which apply to the recipient only – a baronetcy is hereditarily entailed. The eldest son of a baronet who is born in wedlock succeeds to a baronetcy upon his father's death, but will not be officially recognised until his name is recognised by being placed on the Official Roll. With some exceptions granted with special remainder by letters patent, baronetcies descend through the male line.

A full list of extant baronets appears in Burke's Peerage and Baronetage, which also published a record of extinct baronetcies.

A baronetcy is not a peerage; so baronets, like knights and junior members of peerage families, are commoners and not peers of the realm. Originally, all first baronets were knighted. Baronets also had other rights, including the right to have the eldest son knighted on his 21st birthday. However, at the beginning of George IV's reign, these rights were eroded by orders-in-council on the ground that sovereigns should not necessarily be bound by acts of their predecessors. Although never having been automatically entitled to heraldic supporters, baronets who were also a Knight Grand Cross of a Crown order were allowed them in heredity in the first half of the 19th century.

=== Baronets' badge ===
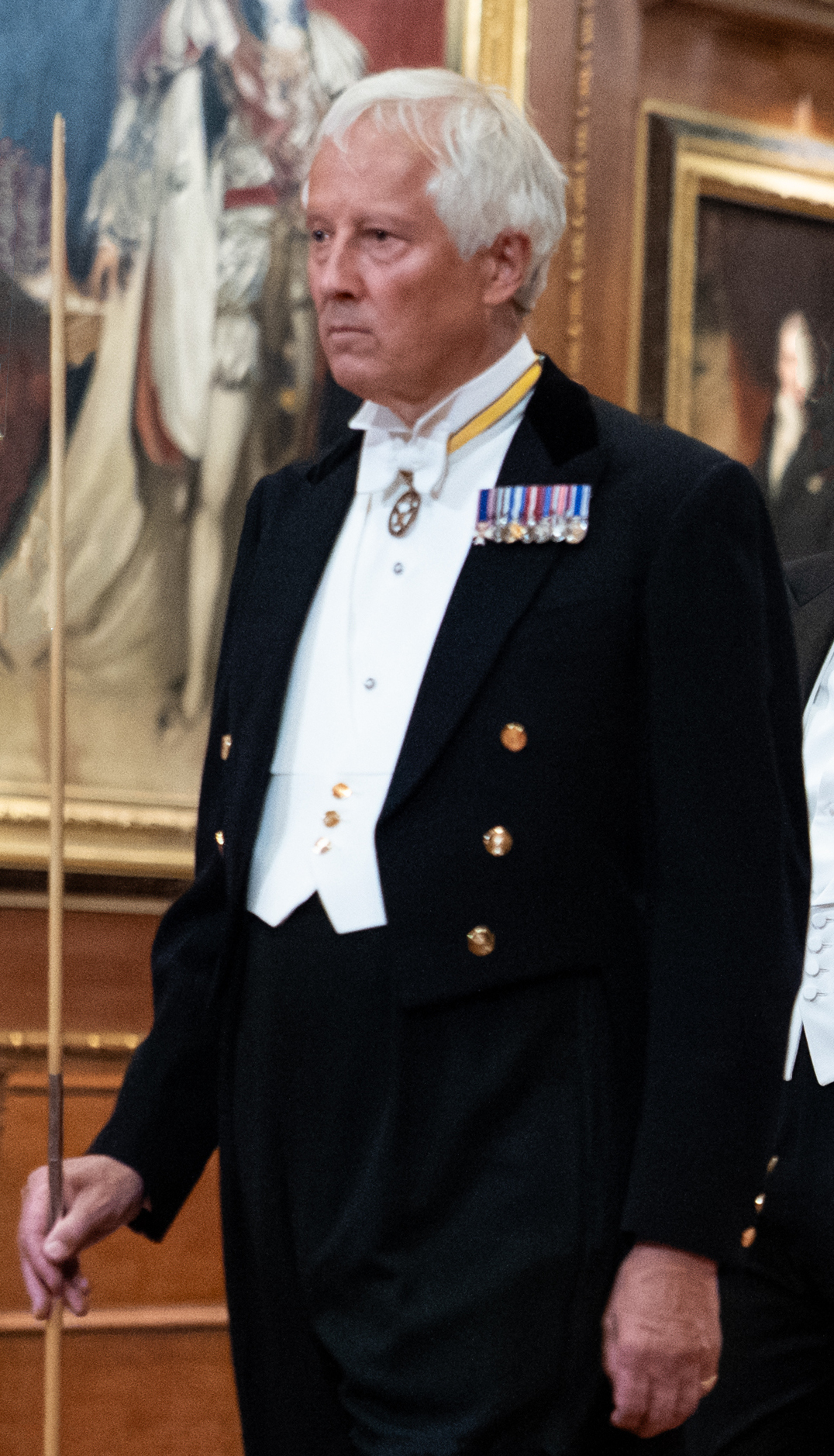
The Earl of Rosslyn wearing his badge as a Baronet of Nova Scotia.

Baronets of Scotland or Nova Scotia were allowed to augment their armorial bearings with the Arms of Nova Scotia and the privilege of wearing a neck badge signifying "of Nova Scotia", suspended by an orange-tawny ribbon. This consists of an escutcheon argent with a saltire azure, an inescutcheon of the Royal Arms of Scotland, with an Imperial Crown above the escutcheon, and encircled with the motto Fax Mentis Honestae Gloria ('Glory is the torch of an honourable mind'). (The badge may also be displayed as part of the baronet's coat of arms, suspended by the ribbon below the escutcheon).

Baronets of England and Ireland applied to King Charles I for permission to wear a badge. Although a badge was worn in the 17th century, it was not until 1929 that King George V granted permission for all baronets (not just those of Scotland) to wear badges. The badge for baronets (other than 'of Nova Scotia', i.e. of Scotland) consists of a shield (displaying the Red Hand of Ulster on a silver field) surmounted by an Imperial Crown, all enclosed in an oval border which is decorated with scroll work. The scroll work includes motifs specific to the geographical designation of the wearer's baronetcy, being decorated with roses (for baronets of England), shamrocks (for baronets of Ireland), roses and thistles (for baronets of Great Britain) or roses, thistles and shamrocks (for baronets of the United Kingdom). The badge is worn suspended from 'a 16mm (5/8-inch) orange riband with a narrow edge of dark blue on both sides' (This badge is not worn by baronets of Scotland, who continue to wear their distinctive Nova Scotia badge suspended from a plain orange ribbon).

=== Addressing a baronet and the wife of a baronet ===
A baronet is referred to and addressed as, for example, "Sir Joseph" (using his forename). The correct style on an envelope for a baronet who has no other titles is "Sir Joseph Bloggs, Bt." or "Sir Joseph Bloggs, Bart." A formal letter would commence with the salutation "Dear Sir Joseph".

The wife of a baronet is addressed and referred to by her married surname, as "Lady Bloggs"; the salutation would be "Dear Lady Bloggs". Her given name is used only when necessary to distinguish between two holders of the same title. For example, if a baronet has died and the title has passed to his son, the widow (the new baronet's mother) will remain "Lady Bloggs" while he (the son) is not married, but if he is or becomes married, his wife becomes "Lady Bloggs" while his mother will be known by the style "Alice, Lady Bloggs". Alternatively, the mother may prefer to be known as "The Dowager Lady Bloggs". A previous wife will also become "Alice, Lady Bloggs" to distinguish her from the current wife of the incumbent baronet. She would not be "Lady Alice Bloggs", a style reserved for the daughters of dukes, marquesses and earls (and now Ladies Companion of the Garter and Ladies of the Thistle without higher styles).

The children of a baronet are not entitled to the use of any courtesy titles.

=== Baronetess ===
In history, there have been only four baronetesses:

- Dame Mary Bolles, 1st Btss (née Witham) (1579–1662); the only woman apparently to be created a baronetess (of Nova Scotia)
- Dame Eleanor Dalyell, 10th Btss (1895–1972), cr. 1685, whose title and estate of The Binns passed to her son, the former Labour politician Tam Dalyell MP (who chose not to use the title)
- Dame Daisy Dunbar, 8th Btss of Hempriggs (1906–1997), cr. 1706
- Dame Anne Christian Maxwell Macdonald, 11th Btss (née Stirling-Maxwell; 1906–2011) was recognised by the Lyon Court in 2005 as 11th holder of the baronetcy (formerly Stirling-Maxwell) under the 1707 remainder. She succeeded her father in 1956.

In 1976, Lord Lyon King of Arms stated that, without examining the patent of every Scottish baronetcy, he was not in a position to confirm that only these four title creations could pass through female lines.

As of 2025, there are no living baronetesses.

For a baronetess one should write, for example, "Dame Daisy Smith, Btss" on the envelope. At the head of the letter, one would write "Dear Dame Daisy", and to refer to her, one would say "Dame Daisy" or "Dame Daisy Smith" (never "Dame Smith").

=== Territorial designations ===
All baronetcies are created with a territorial sub-designation; however, only more recent creations duplicating the original creation require territorial designations. So, for example, there have been baronetcies Moore of Colchester, Moore of Hancox, Moore of Kyleburn, and Moore of Moore Lodge.

=== Baronetcies with special remainders ===
Baronetcies usually descend through heirs male of the body of the grantee, and can rarely be inherited by females or collateral kin, unless created with special remainder, for example:

- with remainder to heirs male forever (Broun baronetcy, of Colstoun (1686), Hay baronetcy of Alderston (1703), etc.)
- with remainder to the sons of the grantee's daughters, and the heirs male of their bodies (Hicking (later North) baronetcy, of Southwell (1920), etc.)
- with remainder to the grantee's daughter's son (Amcotts baronetcy, of Kettlethorp (1796), etc.)
- with remainder to the grantee's son-in-law (Middleton (later Noel) baronetcy, of The Navy (1781), Rich baronetcy, of London (1676), etc.)
- with remainder to the grantee's brother(s) (Chapman baronetcy, of Killua Castle (1782), Pigot baronetcy, of Patshull (1764), White baronetcy of Tuxford and Wallingwells (1802) etc.)
- with remainder, in default of male issue of the grantee, to the grantee's brothers and to the grantee's father's second cousin, and the heirs male of their bodies (Robinson baronetcy, of Rokeby Park (1730))
- with remainder to tailzie succeeding the grantee in the estate (Dalyell baronetcy of The Binns (1685))
- with remainder specifically excluding the grantee's eldest son (Stonhouse baronetcy, of Radley (1628))

== Heraldic badges ==
=== Red Hand of Ulster ===
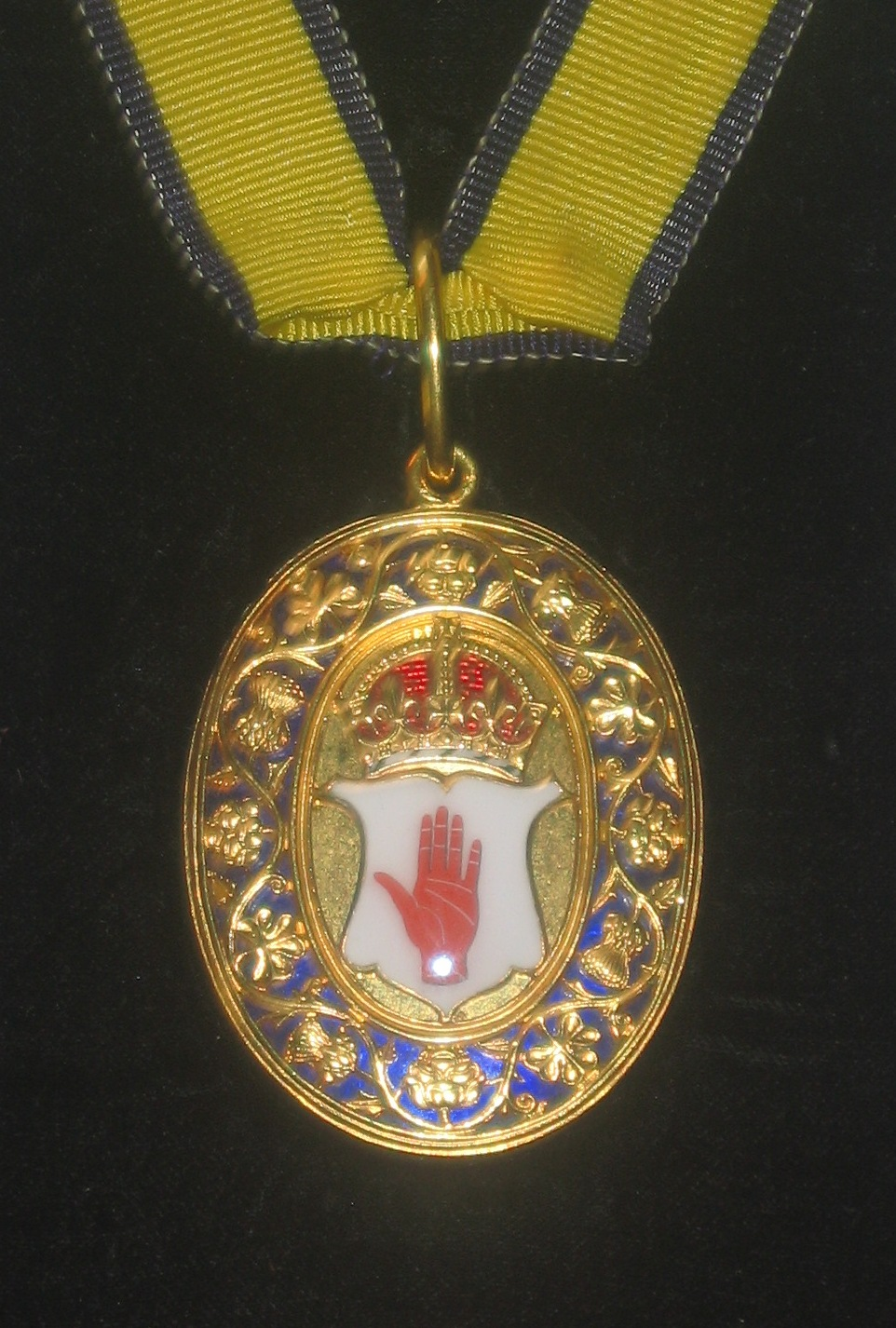
Neck decoration for baronets, depicting the Red Hand of Ulster

Marking the baronetage's origins in the Plantation of Ulster, baronets of England, Ireland, Great Britain or the United Kingdom (i.e., all except baronets of Nova Scotia) can display the Red Hand of Ulster (sinister (left) hand version) as a heraldic badge, being the arms of the ancient kings of Ulster. This badge (or augmentation of honour) is blazoned as follows: Argent a Hand sinister couped at the wrist extended in pale Gules. King James I of England established the hereditary Order of Baronets in England on 22 May 1611, in the words of Collins' Peerage (1741): "for the plantation and protection of the whole Kingdom of Ireland, but more especially for the defence and security of the Province of Ulster, and therefore for their distinction those of this order and their descendants may bear the badge (Red Hand of Ulster) in their coats of arms either in canton or an escutcheon at their election". Since 1929, such baronets may also display the Red Hand of Ulster on its own as a badge, suspended by a ribbon below the shield of arms.

=== Arms of Nova Scotia ===
Baronets of Nova Scotia, unlike other baronets, do not use the Baronet's Badge (of Ulster), but have their own badge showing the escutcheon of the arms of Nova Scotia: Argent, a Saltire Azure with an inescutcheon of the Royal Arms of Scotland. From before 1929 to the present, it has been customary practice for such baronets to display this badge on its own suspended by the order's ribbon below the shield of arms.

=== Gallery ===
The Red Hand of Ulster (sinister (left) hand version), as used by baronets (other than those of Nova Scotia) as a heraldic badge

Arms of Nova Scotia: Argent, a Saltire Azure an inescutcheon of the Royal Arms of Scotland, as used by baronets of Nova Scotia as a heraldic badge

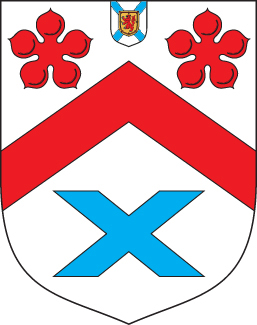
Coat of arms of the Agnew baronets (1629) with the badge of a Baronet of Nova Scotia (Coat of arms of Nova Scotia) in chief

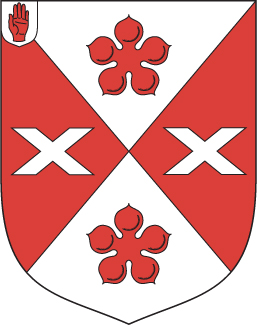
Coat of arms of the Agnew baronets (1895) with the badge of a Baronet of the United Kingdom (Red Hand of Ulster) in canton

A baronet's medal ribbon

== Number of baronetcies ==
Estimated numbers of baronetcies as at 1 January 2023
Creations	Total	Baronets	Peers
Baronets of England	134	84	50
Baronets of Ireland	57	34	23
Baronets of Nova Scotia	103	73	30
Baronets of Great Britain	121	90	31
Baronets of the United Kingdom	777	671	106
Total	1192	952	240

The first publication listing all baronetcies ever created was C. J. Parry's Index of Baronetcy Creations (1967). This listed them in alphabetical order, other than the last five creations (Dodds of West Chiltington, Redmayne of Rushcliffe, Pearson of Gressingham, Finlay of Epping and Thatcher of Scotney). It showed the total number created from 1611 to 1964 to have been 3,482. They include five of Oliver Cromwell, several of which were recreated by Charles II. Twenty-five were created between 1688 and 1784 by James II in exile after his dethronement, by his son James Stuart ("The Old Pretender") and his grandson Charles Edward Stuart ("Bonnie Prince Charlie"). These "Jacobite baronetcies" were never accepted by the English Crown, have all disappeared and should properly be excluded from the 3,482, making the effective number of creations 3,457. A close examination of Parry's publication shows he missed one or two, so there might well have been some more.

As of 2026, including baronetcies where succession was dormant or unproven, there were 1,226 baronetcies divided into five classes of creation included on The Official Roll of the Baronetage – 142 of England, 60 of Ireland, 115 of Scotland, 125 of Great Britain and 784 of the United Kingdom.

The total number of baronetcies today is approximately 1,204, although only some 1,020 are on The Official Roll of the Baronetage. It is unknown whether some baronetcies remain extant and it may be that nobody can prove himself to be the actual heir. Over 200 baronetcies are now held by peers; and others, such as the Knox line, have been made tenuous by internal family disputes. According to the Ministry of Justice, it is not necessary to prove succession to a baronetcy in order to use the title, but a person cannot be referred to as a baronet in any official capacity unless their name is on the Official Roll.

=== Baronetage decline since 1965 ===
There were 1,490 baronetcies extant on 1 January 1965. Since then the number has reduced by 286 through extinction or dormancy: a gross decline of 19.2% (up to 2017). Extant baronetcies numbered about 1,236 in 2015, and 1,204 as of 2017.

Since 1965 only one new baronetcy has been created, for Sir Denis Thatcher on 7 December 1990, husband of a former British prime minister, Margaret Thatcher (later Baroness Thatcher); their only son, Sir Mark Thatcher, succeeded as 2nd Baronet upon his father's death in 2003.

Seven baronetcies dormant in 1965 have since been revived: Innes baronetcy, of Coxton (1686), Nicolson baronetcy of that Ilk and of Lasswade (1629), Hope baronetcy, of Kirkliston (1698), St John (later St John-Mildmay) baronetcy, of Farley (1772), Maxwell-Macdonald baronetcy of Pollok (1682), Inglis baronetcy, of Cramond, Edinburgh (1687) and Von Friesendorff baronetcy, of Hirdech, Sweden (1661).

== Premier Baronet ==
=== England ===
The Premier Baronet (of England) is the unofficial title afforded to the current holder of the oldest extant baronetcy in the realm. The Premier Baronet is regarded as the senior member of the Baronetage, and ranks above other baronets (unless they hold a peerage title) in the United Kingdom Order of Precedence. Sir Nicholas Bacon, 14th Baronet, is the current Premier Baronet; his family's senior title was created by King James I in 1611.

=== Scotland ===
The Premier Baronets of Nova Scotia (Scotland) were the Gordon baronets of Gordonstoun and Letterfourie until the title's extinction in 1908. Subsequently, the Premier Scottish Baronets are the Innes baronets of that Ilk (cr. 28 May 1625), the present Premier Baronet being Charles Innes-Ker, 11th Duke of Roxburghe.

=== Ireland ===
The Premier Baronetcy of Ireland was created for Sir Dominic Sarsfield in 1619, and was held by his successors until the attainder of the 4th Viscount Sarsfield in 1691. Since then the descendants of Sir Francis Annesley Bt., the Annesley baronets, have been the Premier Baronets of Ireland; presently Francis William Dighton Annesley, 16th Viscount Valentia.

== See also ==
- Standing Council of the Baronetage
- List of extant baronetcies
- List of baronetcies (currently incomplete)
- Orders, decorations, and medals of the United Kingdom
- Canadian peers and baronets

== References and sources ==
Sources

- Sir Martin Lindsay of Dowhill, Bt (1979). The Baronetage, 2nd edition. published by the author.
- William Stubbs (1883). Chronicles of the Reigns of Edward I and Edward II, Vol. 2, Part IV – Vita Et Mors Edwardi II Conscripta A Thoma de La More. Longman & Co.
- Debrett's website
- Burke's website
