= House of the Binns =

17th-century mansion

Coordinates: 55°59′27″N 3°31′23″W

Designations

Inventory of Gardens and Designed Landscapes in Scotland
- Official name: House of the Binns
- Designated: 1 July 1987
- Reference no.: GDL00216

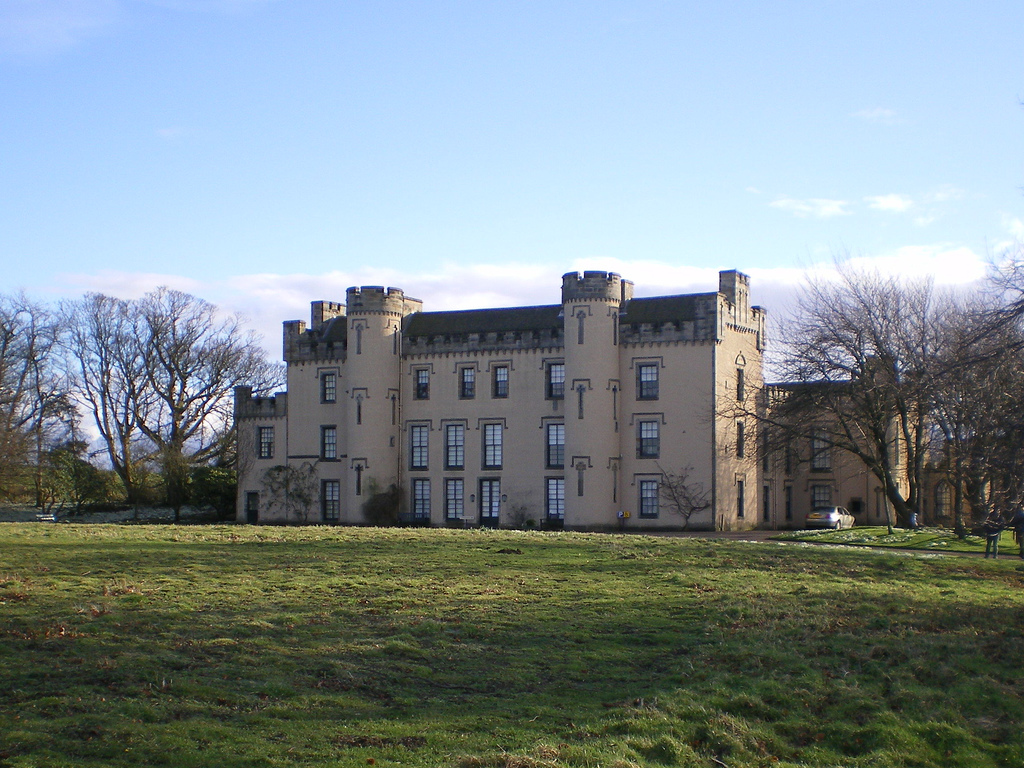
The House of the Binns

The House of the Binns, or simply the Binns, is a historic house and estate in West Lothian, Scotland, the seat of the Dalyell baronets and family (pronounced dee el). It dates principally from the early 17th century and was gifted to the National Trust for Scotland in 1944 by Eleanor Dalyell. It was the home of MP Tam Dalyell until his death in January 2017.

The estate spreads over two hills (dà bheinn in Gaelic) from which its name is derived, i.e. it is named "the house of the hills". It is set in 200 acres (80 hectares) of parkland, and the house enjoys panoramic views of central Scotland: to the north, across the River Forth to the Highlands, and south over the Pentland Hills. The house contains a collection of porcelain, furniture, and portraits which trace the family's lives and interests through the centuries.

== History of the estate ==
Perhaps inhabited since prehistoric times, Binns Hill may have been the site of a Pictish fort.

Written records begin in 1335, and record a land of the "Bynnis". There was certainly a manor house here by 1478, when records indicate the owner was an Archibald Meldrum, son of the late James Meldrum of the Bynnis. In 1599, it was owned by James Lord Lyndsay, who sold it to Sir William Livingston of Kilsyth.

In 1612 the estate was purchased by a wealthy and well-connected Edinburgh burgess, Thomas Dalyell. Dalyell was a butter merchant, who had become prosperous importing butter from Orkney to Leith (to be sold as axle grease). In 1601, he had married the daughter of Edward, Lord Kinloss and, when the Scots King, James VI, ascended to the English throne and Kinloss was made his Master of the Rolls in London, Dalyell obtained the lucrative post of deputy. In that senior position, he acquired enough of a fortune to return to Scotland and join the landed gentry. He bought "the lands of Bynnis and Croceflattis wirth the manor place thereof", and the Dalyell family have lived there ever since. Between 1621 and 1630, this Thomas Dalyell rebuilt the original house, and parts of the interior still reflect that period; in particular the north-west portion of the present entrance front, and decoration of the High Hall and King's Room (created in the hope of a visit from Charles I, which never came to be). These rooms still contain examples of some of the earliest cornices and mouldings in Scotland. Thomas Dalyell's more famous son, the Royalist General Sir Tam Dalyell continued the development of the house, adding the first of the towers, and the western range.

=== General Tam o' the Binns ===
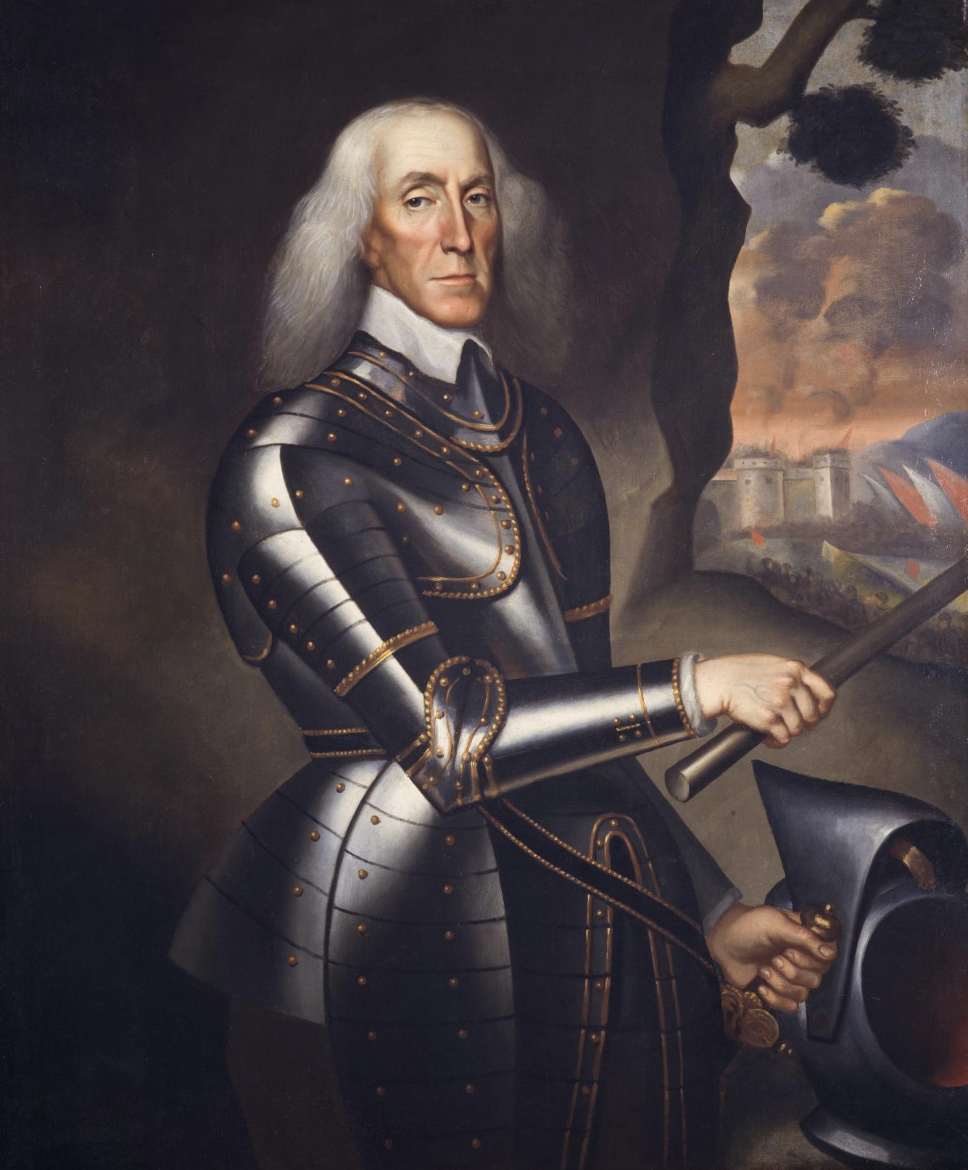
Tam Dalyell of the Binns

The house's main historic claim to fame is the occupancy of General Tam Dalyell of the Binns. Dalyell served as a military commander for both Charles I and Charles II. During the Civil War, he was taken prisoner by the parliamentarians at the battle of Worcester and imprisoned in the Tower of London. However, he escaped and travelled to Russia where he fought for the Tsar—earning the epithet "Muscovite De'il". He returned to Scotland at the Restoration of the king, and secured his feared reputation (as "Bluidy Tam") by his violent suppression of the Covenanters from the 1660s. In 1678, he became Commander-in-Chief in Scotland and, in 1681, he mustered a new regiment at the Binns, becoming its first colonel. That Regiment, the Royal Regiment of Scots Dragoons, which later became the Royal Scots Greys in 1877, was to have itself a long history. Many artefacts belonging to General Dalyell (including his boots) are still located at the Binns. Some are connected with the fairly dubious stories that have grown up around him. In this house, the General is said to have played cards with the Devil: and today, in the entrance (or Laigh) hall, the very table on which he is supposed to have played can still be seen. The story goes that, although the devil normally beat Tam, one night Tam won, and in fury the Devil threw a marble table at him. However, it missed and it landed in the Sergeants' Pond outside. A marble table was indeed found when the pond dried up 200 years later. The cards, goblet and spoon, supposedly used in the game are displayed in the house. The General is said to have told the Devil, who threatened to blow down his house and its walls, that "I will build me a turret at every corner to pin down my walls".

=== 18th century to the present day ===
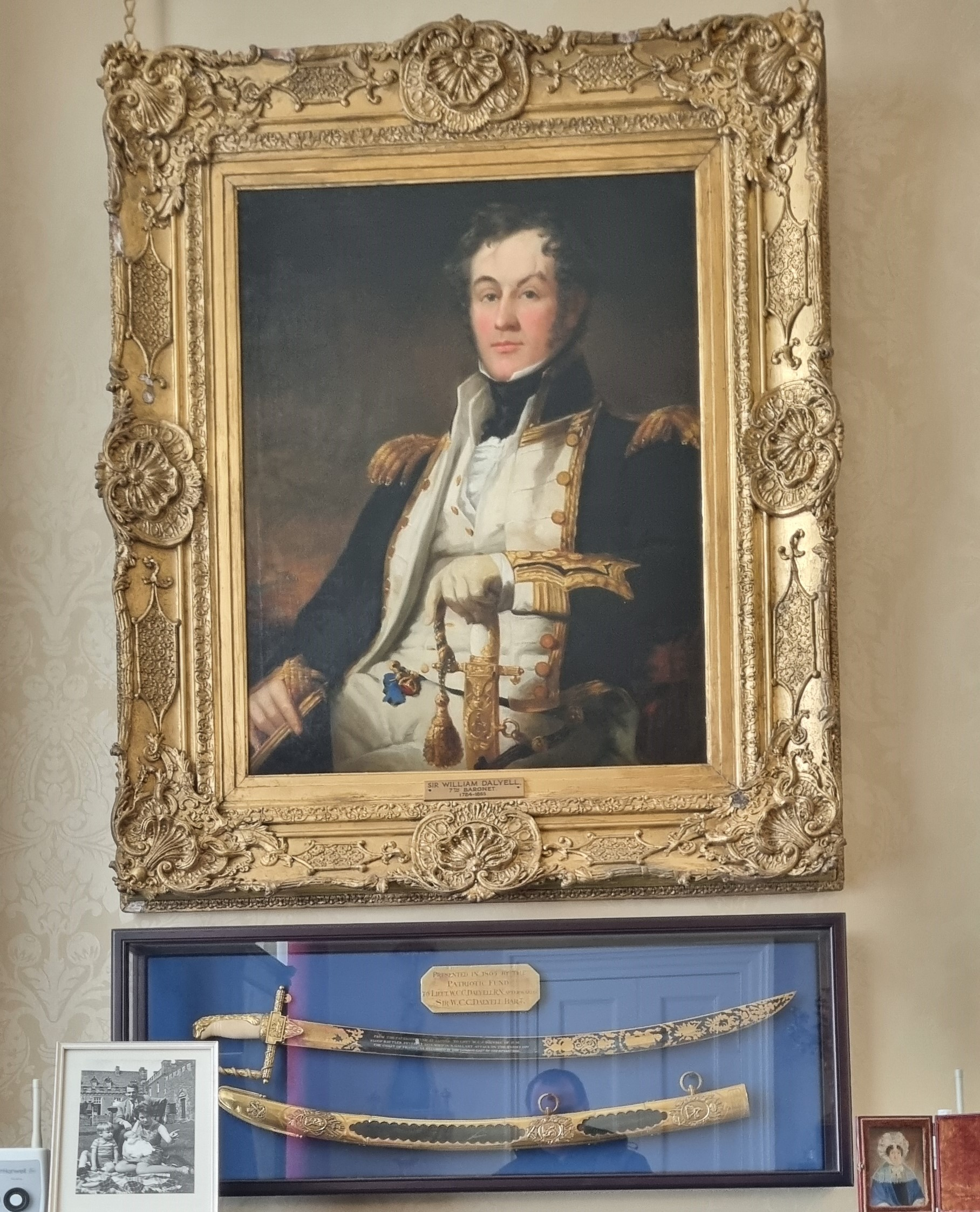
Sword and Painting of William Cunningham Dalyell

In the 1740s and 1750s, Sir Robert Dalyell, 4th Baronet created a new dining room and the current Laigh Hall by joining two cellar rooms together and heightening the main ceiling of the building, as well as also adding an arcade and a new front entrance to the house.

Four of his sons would later inherit the house and estate. Today the house principally reflects its extensions of the mid-18th and early 19th century. In 1810, Robert's son, Sir James Dalyell of the Binns, 5th Baronet paid for the architect William Burn (1789–1870) to adapt the building to the Scottish baronial style, adding further towers and mock battlements. Some of the Gothic exterior decoration was inspired by Walter Scott, who was a friend of the Dalyell family. Today, the building is three-storey at the main north facade, with two-storey wings.

In August 1775, John Graham Dalyell (son of Sir Robert Dalyell of the Binns, 4th Baronet) was born and raised in the house, later becoming a judge, author and antiquarian before succeeding as 6th baronet (following the death of his oldest brother) and inheriting the estate. His brother William Cunningham Dalyell, a Royal Navy officer, would succeed John as 7th baronet on his death in June 1851 inheriting the house and estate (his Lloyd's Patriotic Fund hangs below his painting in the house). The house would then pass to his youngest brother Sir Robert Dalyell, 8th Baronet before passing to his sister, Elizabeth Grace Cornwall-Dalyell, and then down the female line via a subsequent legal proceeding.

In 1944, the house, its parkland, its contents, and an endowment for its upkeep were given to the National Trust for Scotland by Eleanor Dalyell. The charter she granted states that the "history, legend and memory of the family of Dalyell of the Binns, shall be preserved ..." for the benefit and enjoyment of the nation. However, the right of the family to reside in the house was retained.

The former MP for Linlithgow and "Father of the House", Sir Tam Dalyell (1932–2017), lived in the western range of the house. His widow, Kathleen, is the National Trust's representative for the House of the Binns and heavily involved in its maintenance.

== The parkland ==
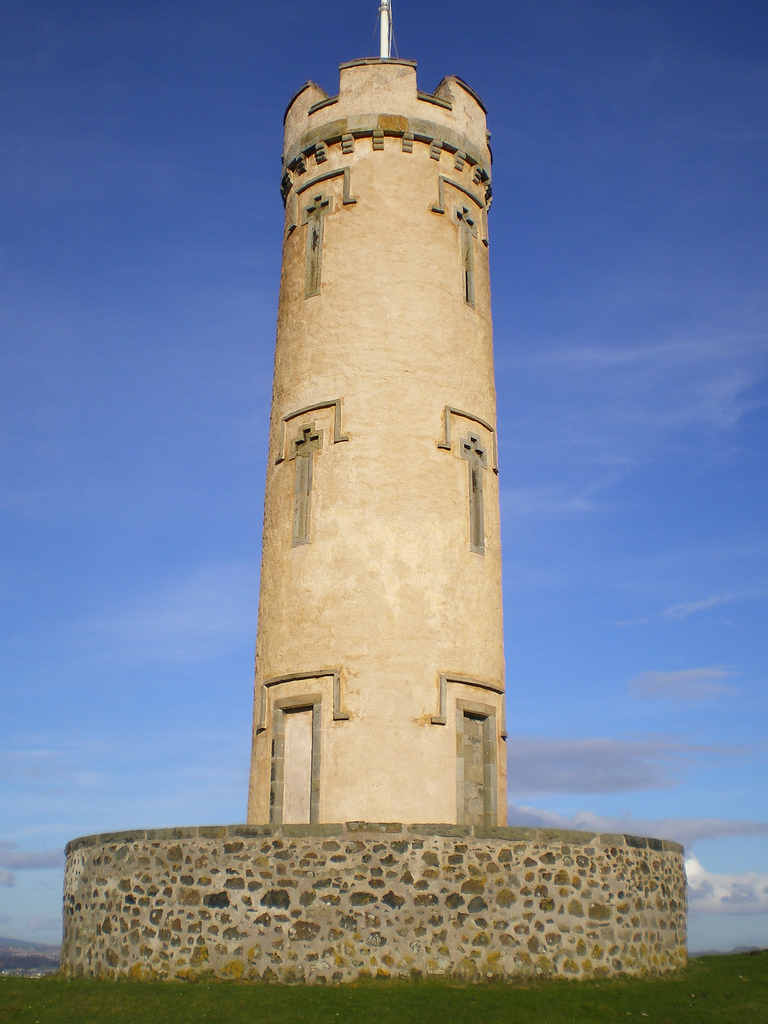
The tower stands as a folly within the estate park

The house is set in 200 acres (0.81 km^{2}) of parkland, and approached by two drives: the current west drive, and main east drive that has been disused since 1913. The category "B" listed folly Binns Tower is situated at the highest point of the park, Binns Hill. It was designed by Alexander Allan in 1826, allegedly as the result of a wager placed with the then owner, Sir James Dalyell. On the west side of Binns Hill is a woodland garden with walks through it to the tower. Beneath the escarpment to the south-west of the Tower is General Tam's cave, supposedly used by him for meditation.

In addition to the folly, the park contains a number of other important features. Off the west drive is a derelict stables complex (built before 1818) and a walled garden. The walled garden, constructed at an unknown date, served as a kitchen garden until World War II. It was used previous by a contractor as a tree and shrub nursery, although part was also used to provide flowers for the house. Towards the west drive is the remains of an old quarry (believed to be pre 19th century). Also near the west drive is the Sergeant's Pond, which was constructed circa 1681 as a watering place for the horses of the Royal Scots Greys by General Dalyell. The pond was also used again as a watering place for the Royal Scots Greys regiment in 1935 when they were encamped at the Binns.

In a valley in the south-east corner of the park lies a ruined former mid-19th century chapel that eventually became a farmers cottage. A caravan park was established in 1978 in the valley beside the Errick burn and a small woodland area. The caravan park has since closed.

== See also ==
- Dalyell baronets
- List of National Trust for Scotland properties
