= Dalyell baronets =

Baronetcy in the Baronetage of Nova Scotia

Arms of Dalyell of the Binns, matriculated with the Court of the Lord Lyon in 1685: Sable a naked man his arms extended au naturel, on a canton argent a sword and pistol disposed in saltire proper.

Arms of Dalyell of the Binns, matriculated in 1772: Quarterly: 1 and 4, Or, a bend chequy sable and argent between three buckles azure, 2 & 3, Sable a naked man his arms extended au naturel, on a canton argent a sword and pistol disposed in saltire proper.

The Dalyell Baronetcy in the Baronetage of Nova Scotia was created 7 November 1685 for a Scottish General, Thomas Dalyell of the Binns. The succession of the title is unusual in that, in default of heirs male, it can pass by special remainder to tailzie succeeding him in the estate of The Binns.

The current baronet is Sir Gordon Wheatley Dalyell of the Binns, 12th Baronet. He inherited the title from his father, former politician Tam Dalyell, in 2017.

== Dalyell of the Binns, Linlithgow (1685) ==
- Sir Thomas Dalyell of the Binns, 1st Baronet (died c. 1700)
- Sir Thomas Dalyell of the Binns, 2nd Baronet (died 1719), dormant
- Sir James Dalyell of the Binns, 3rd Baronet (c. 1690–1747), claimed between 1723 and 1728
- Sir Robert Dalyell of the Binns, 4th Baronet (died 1791)
- Sir James Dalyell of the Binns, 5th Baronet (1774–1841)
- Sir John Graham Dalyell of the Binns, 6th Baronet (c. 1775–1851)
- Sir William Cunningham Dalyell of the Binns, 7th Baronet (1787–1865)
- Sir Robert Alexander Osborne Dalyell of the Binns, 8th Baronet (1821–1886), dormant
  - His sister, Elizabeth Grace Cornwall-Dalyell, (died 1913) inherited the Binns, but not the baronetcy
- Sir James Bruce Wilkie-Dalyell of the Binns, 9th Baronet (1867–1935), cousin of the above, as son of Harriet Wilkie, née Dalyell, aunt; claimed 1914, dormant
- Dame Eleanor Isabel "Nora" Dalyell, de jure 10th Baronetess (1895–1972), daughter of preceding
- Sir Thomas "Tam" Dalyell of the Binns, 11th Baronet (1932–2017), claimed 1973, son of preceding
- Sir Gordon Wheatley Dalyell of the Binns, 12th Baronet (born 1965), son of preceding

The heir apparent is the present holder's son, Matthew Thomas Dalyell (born 2001).
