= Peter Youens =

British diplomat

Sir Peter William Youens
- Peter Youens (right) with Hastings Banda (left) in London in 1964
- Born: Peter William Youens; 29 April 1916; Brodsworth, West Riding of Yorkshire, England
- Died: 6 May 2000 (aged 84); London, England
- Education: King Edward VII School
- Alma mater: Wadham College, Oxford

Sir Peter William Youens, CMG, OBE (19 April 1916 – 6 May 2000) was a British diplomat who played an important role in the transition of Nyasaland to independence as Malawi in 1964. He was Deputy Chief Secretary of Nyasaland from 1953 to 1963, and secretary to the Prime Minister and the Cabinet of Malawi from 1963 to 1966, where he enjoyed the confidence of the prime minister Hastings Banda (who became President of Malawi in 1966). After leaving Malawi he was prominent as a director of Lonrho.

== Early life and career ==
Youens' father was a clergyman in Brodsworth and his elder brother John was eventually to become Chaplain General to the Forces. Youens was educated at King Edward VII School in Sheffield—where he played cricket for the First XI in 1935 and was Second Prefect—and at Wadham College, Oxford.

He joined the British Colonial Administrative Service in 1938. After service in the Navy he became assistant district commissioner and then district commissioner in Sierra Leone, before moving to Nyasaland as assistant secretary in 1951.

Youens was appointed OBE in 1960, CMG in 1962, and was knighted in 1965.

== Nyasaland and Malawi ==
Youens was deputy chief secretary in the British colonial administration of Nyasaland from 1953 to 1963. Dr Hastings Banda returned to Nyasaland in 1958 to lead the Nyasaland African Congress and Youens undertook the role of chief negotiator between Banda and Sir Glyn Jones, the Governor of Nyasaland. The discussions centred on internal self-government, secession from the Federation of Rhodesia and Nyasaland, and eventual independence in 1964.

When Banda became Prime Minister in 1963, he asked for Youens as his private secretary. Youens remained in this post until 1966, when Banda declared Malawi a republic with himself as president.

== Lonrho ==
In the 1960s Tiny Rowland, the managing director of Lonrho, was establishing links with African leaders in connection with Lonrho's assets, which included sugar plantations and railway interests in Malawi.

Youens became one of Rowland's friends and after retiring from Malawi in 1966, became an executive director of Lonrho. He left Lonrho in 1969 to join John Tyzack & Partners, but returned to the Lonrho board in 1980 where he remained until 1994, after control of Lonrho had passed from Rowland to the German businessman Dieter Bock.

== Death ==
Youens died on 6 May 2000 in his home of London, England, from complications of pneumonia.
