= The Maltese Double Cross – Lockerbie =

1994 documentary film by Allan Francovich

- Directed by: Allan Francovich
- Written by: Allan Francovich
- Release date: 1994

The Maltese Double Cross – Lockerbie is a documentary film about the 1988 bombing of Pan Am Flight 103.

Produced, written, and directed by Allan Francovich and financed by Tiny Rowland, the film was released by Hemar Enterprises in November 1994.

With a controversial premise, it was immediately threatened with legal action by lawyers acting for a US government official, and the British government prevented screenings at the 1994 London Film Festival, at the Institute of Contemporary Arts and at several universities. But Labour MP Tam Dalyell ignored libel warnings and went ahead and showed the film at the House of Commons on 16 November 1994.

Though it was never widely distributed, the film stirred up a great deal of controversy – particularly in the United Kingdom. Reviews of the film in major UK publications were mostly negative, even as they said that the film revealed certain problems in the mainstream account of the Lockerbie bombing. The film came in for fierce criticism from some American family members of victims of Pan Am 103 and from the governments of Britain and the United States. Other (mainly British) family members endorsed the conclusions of the film.

== Synopsis ==
The Maltese Double Cross – Lockerbie discusses evidence and witnesses that would eventually figure at the Pan Am Flight 103 bombing trial in 2000:

- The Mebo MST–13 timer fragment, which Thomas Thurman of the FBI's forensic laboratory said that he identified on 15 June 1990;
- Mebo's Swiss owner, Edwin Bollier, is interviewed at length;
- forensic scientist Dr Michael Scott describes DERA's 'forensic expert', Alan Feraday, as a technician without any formal qualifications as a scientist;
- A solicitor, Alastair Logan, criticises DERA's Dr Thomas Hayes for the forensic evidence that was used to convict the Maguire Seven;
- Oswald LeWinter, claiming to be a CIA operative, says the appointment of 'Libyan dirty tricks expert' Vincent Cannistraro to head the CIA's team investigating Lockerbie 'would be funny, if it were not an obscenity';
- Lester Coleman stated that the bomb was linked to a terrorist cell trained by CIA operative Edwin P. Wilson; and,
- A best-selling author, David Yallop, reviews the available evidence and looks at who might have been responsible for the Lockerbie bombing.

The documentary disputes the conclusion reached by the official investigation into the bombing of Pan Am Flight 103, instead advancing the theory that the bomb was introduced onto the aircraft by an unwitting drug mule, Khaled Jafaar, in what the filmmaker claims is a CIA-protected suitcase.

Abolhassan Bani-Sadr, a former president of Iran, discusses the idea that Iran took revenge for the shootdown by the USS Vincennes of Iran Air Flight 655 in July 1988.

The film quotes Tiny Rowland as disclosing that Pik Botha told him that he and 22 South African delegates were going to New York for the Namibian Independence Ratification Ceremony and were all booked on the Pan Am flight 103. They were given a warning from a source that could not be ignored.

Botha and 6 others managed to get on an earlier flight, but the remaining 16 stayed in London and missed the official event.

== Broadcast and screenings ==
The Maltese Double Cross – Lockerbie was to have been shown at the London Film Festival in November 1994 but was withdrawn at the last minute under threat of a libel action by Michael Hurley, a retired US Drug Enforcement Administration operative. The London Film Festival noted at the time that "certain statements similar to those made in the film are currently the subject of legal action and, in view of this, it has been decided to withdraw the film." After the cancellation, director Francovich claimed that "there is no way in hell they're going to stop this film. It will be shown at film festivals around the world. It will make its way back to Britain." Some family members of victims of Flight 103 who supported the film expressed disappointment over its withdrawal. Jim Swire, whose daughter Flora died on the flight, said he had "never felt so angry in my life" and Pamela Dix, who lost a brother, argued that "the festival should have been brave enough to show the film."

Several days after the movie was withdrawn from the film festival, Labour MP Tam Dalyell arranged for the film to be screened in the House of Commons on 16 November 1994 where it was viewed by diplomats, members of the press, and bereaved family members of victims of the bombing. The first public showing of The Maltese Double Cross in Britain took place at the Glasgow Film Theatre on 17 November 1994.

The UK's Channel 4 had planned to broadcast the film as early as 1994 but apparently backtracked when several American relatives of PA 103 victims wrote a letter to a newspaper alleging that the film was partially funded by Libya and used a number of "confidence tricksters" as sources. After the Special Broadcasting Service of Australia agreed to screen the film in its entirety, Channel 4 re-entered negotiations with Francovich and reached a compromise to broadcast a slimmed down, 92-minute version of the film which cut material that could have caused legal problems. The shortened version of the film was ultimately shown on Channel 4 on 11 May 1995, but some American relatives of the victims again criticised the decision and accused Channel 4 of giving air-time to what they claimed as "Libyan propaganda." A Channel 4 spokeswoman said the decision to broadcast the film was based on the view that it needed to be shown to a wider public.

The film was prevented from being shown on television or cinemas in the United States, but eventually played at the Pacific Film Archive in July 1998.

== Reaction ==
Though it was never released commercially, the film garnered a great deal of attention in the British press, from the governments of the United States and the United Kingdom, and from family members whose loved ones died in the Pan Am Flight 103 bombing.

=== Reviews ===
After The Maltese Double Cross was broadcast on television, it received several reviews in mainstream British newspapers which were generally negative. Writing in The Guardian, Stuart Jeffries suggested that the complex argument of the film was "ill presented" and that "if future documentarists need an example of how not to make a film about complicated intrigues, they should watch The Maltese Double Cross." In his review of the film in The Independent, Thomas Sutcliffe noted that "Francovich wasn't exactly a dispassionate seeker after truth," and that although the film raised "some real questions about the official account…it didn't replace it with any reliable truth of its own." Similarly, Lynn Truss of The Times noted that the film had an important and controversial story to tell, but that the "obfuscations of the commentary and editing were unpardonable". In 2006, Australian journalist and filmmaker John Pilger argued that the Francovich documentary had succeeded in destroying "the official truth that Libya was responsible for the sabotage of Pan Am 103 over Lockerbie in 1988."

=== Governmental criticism ===
The governments of the United States and the United Kingdom and their respective agencies strongly contested the conclusions of the film as well as the character and honesty of some of the film's participants.

In January 1995, Francovich claimed that new evidence (in the form of a US intelligence document) added further weight to the argument in his film that Iran had paid to have the bombing carried out, a claim promptly dismissed by the US State Department, the British Foreign Office, and the Scottish Office.

Her Majesty's Government dismissed the document, which it said was highly redacted and based upon second and third-hand sources, as adding no new information, while the Scottish Office argued that it was an old story. The US State Department claimed that it had investigated a possible Iranian connection over the course of three years, but had uncovered no credible evidence along those lines.

The televising by Channel 4 of The Maltese Double Cross on 11 May 1995 provoked an even stronger reaction from official US and British agencies. The Guardian reported, for example, that the American Embassy and the Scottish Crown Office had apparently attempted to discredit the film prior to its broadcast. The embassy had sent a letter to The Guardian – and, the newspaper assumed, to other news organisations as well – which attacked the credibility of three of the film's witnesses and argued that The Maltese Double Cross was "Libyan-financed." The film's production company, Hemar Enterprises, was part-owned by the Lonrho affiliate Metropole Hotels which, in turn, was one third-owned by a state-run Libyan investment company. The Guardian noted that the Crown Office had made similar points in an official statement and argued that they had done so "in apparent co-ordination" with the US embassy. The Crown Office refused to comment on the specific allegations in the film because of the pending trial of two Libyan men, but noted "that the criminal charges in this case were brought on the basis of corroborated evidence supporting these charges and therefore inevitably conflicting with much of what is in the film." The Crown Office did publicly accuse one key witness in the film, Oswald LeWinter, of being a "notorious hoaxer" and another, Juval Aviv, of being a mere El Al airline security guard – not a member of the intelligence community as he claimed. Additionally, the FBI investigated the film at the request of the Scottish police and argued that LeWinter was "a major fabricator" and that overall the film was a sham.

During the controversy in mid-1994 over whether the film would be shown on Channel 4, filmmaker Francovich said he had been told that several CIA agents had been sent to Europe for the purpose of discrediting his production. Francovich also claimed that phones in his company's London office were tapped and cars of film staff members were sabotaged. He asked, "if we are doing such a bullshit movie, why are they putting all these resources into trying to stop us?" Press reports of the time did not provide any corroboration of Francovich's claims.

In a letter to The Guardian published after Channel 4 broadcast the film, Francovich offered a further response to the US and UK governments:

"The attacks by the UK and US authorities on my film The Maltese Double Cross ("UK and US scorn Lockerbie film", The Guardian, 11 May) are exactly what we predicted would happen. The aim is to smear people in the film in order to divert attention from the mass of evidence that supports our claims....The British and US authorities insist that the Lockerbie case is still open. Yet during the months my team has been investigating the subject, not one approach has been made by these authorities to see any of the new evidence we have gathered. Is it any wonder that the Libyans are reluctant to stand trial in Scotland or the US?"

=== Victims' families ===
Reaction to the film from families of the 270 victims of the bombing was mixed. Some American relatives spoke out against plans to televise the film in Britain, accusing Channel 4 of exploiting the victims and of airing "Libyan propaganda", a reference to the allegation that the film was partly funded with Libyan money. One American man, Daniel Cohen, who lost his daughter on Flight 103 was particularly outspoken against the film, calling Francovich a "Libyan dupe" and "at best a journeyman film maker." A December 1993 Financial Times article revealed that Hemar Enterprises was owned by Metropole Hotels, controlled by Tiny Rowland. Shortly after the indictment of Libya in the Pan Am Flight 103 incident, Rowland had sold a percentage of his interests to the Libyan Arab Foreign Investment Company (Lafico), controlled by the Government of Libya. This fact led the Cohens to the belief that Libya had backed the film. After the Cohens saw the film, Susan Cohen said that the film "was full of lies—I had expected that—." She added that the film "looked like an amateur production" and was "so bad, so silly, that I wonder if we had wasted our time trying to stop it."

A number of families in the United Kingdom – some of whom had seen the film screened in the House of Commons – welcomed the broadcast and maintained that they were highly sceptical of the mainstream account. Reverend John Mosey, who lost a daughter, said he had been suspicious of the mainstream line and that the film "justified, with a lot more information, what some of us have felt for three and a half years." Birthe Tager, who lost her son, said after seeing the film that "most of us think the film is the truth. I believe it is the truth."

Susan and Daniel Cohen, the family of American victim Theodora Cohen, said that Jim Swire, whose daughter Flora died on PA 103, asked for families to "keep an open mind" about the production of the film, while other families opposed the production. After viewing the film in the House of Commons, Swire called for an independent inquiry into the bombing and argued that "the intelligence organisations of Germany, the United Kingdom, and the United States were accomplices before the fact to the murder of 270 souls over Lockerbie, Scotland." In an interview with The Guardian in December 1993, Swire said that he "had good reason to believe Coleman's drug theories" even though they were used by Pan American World Airways lawyers to try to deflect responsibility from the company and "'We may be faced with the decision of whether we want the money or the truth." The Cohens believed that Swire had suggested that the families of survivors who had opposed the creation of The Maltese Double Cross – Lockerbie were solely interested in collecting settlement money in the civil suit against Pan Am.

Daniel Cohen sent a critical letter to Swire; the Cohens and Swire have not had any contact since. In addition Daniel Cohen's criticisms about Swire's statements appeared in a 1994 The Independent article that referred to Swire's statements.

=== Death of Francovich ===
Francovich suffered a fatal heart attack in a Customs area at George Bush Intercontinental Airport in Houston, Texas, on 17 April 1997 whilst entering the United States from England; he was 56.

== See also ==
- Pan Am Flight 103 conspiracy theories
