= Pan Am Flight 103 conspiracy theories =

Speculation on the 1988 bombing

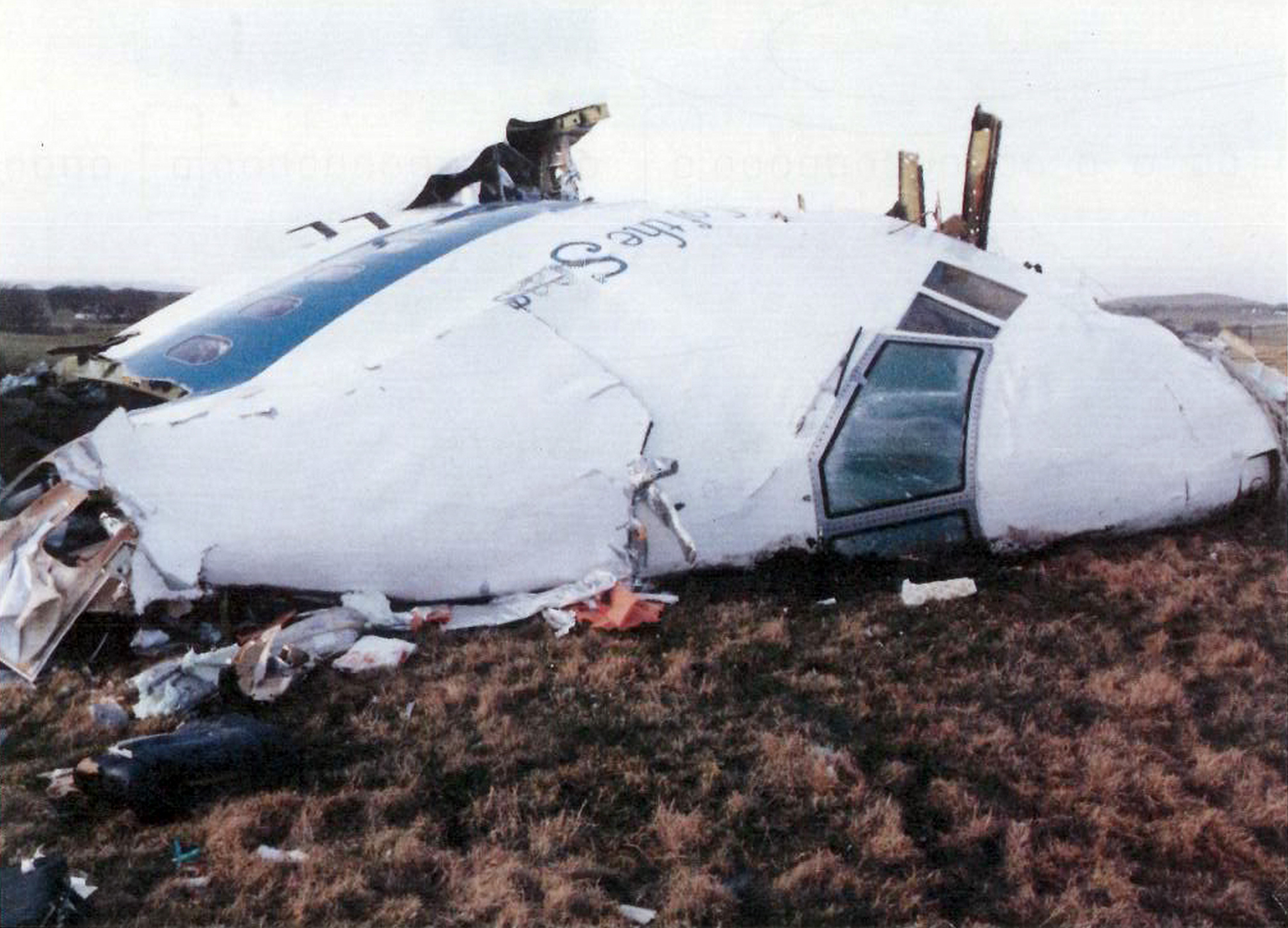
Pan Am Flight 103 after its destruction.

Pan Am Flight 103 conspiracy theories suggest a number of possible explanations for the bombing of Pan Am Flight 103 on 21 December 1988. Some of the theories preceded the official investigation by Scottish police and the FBI; others arose from different interpretation of evidence presented at Libyan agent Abdelbaset al-Megrahi's 2000–2001 trial; yet others have been developed independently by individuals and organisations outside the official investigation.

The Popular Front for the Liberation of Palestine – General Command (PFLP-GC) was the first suspect, in light of a threat it issued against U.S. and Israeli interests before the bombing. The state of Iran was also in the frame very early, with its motive thought to be revenge for the July 1988 shooting down of Iran Air Flight 655 by USS Vincennes. This theory was later reinforced by Abolghasem Mesbahi, former head of Iranian intelligence operations in Europe, who stated after defecting to Germany that Iran had asked Libya and Abu Nidal, a Palestinian guerrilla leader, to carry out the attack on Pan Am 103. In his 1994 film The Maltese Double Cross, Allan Francovich suggested that rogue CIA agents were implicated in a plot that involved them turning a blind eye to a drug running operation in return for intelligence. Evidence presented at Megrahi's trial, together with concerns about the reliability of his conviction, spawned a theory that Libya was framed. Abu Nidal allegedly confessed to the bombing before his death, thereby triggering another theory, while Joe Vialls put forward his own explanation that relied on the bomb being detonated remotely. Finally, in December 2013, Patrick Haseldine suggested that the bombing was an assassination by South Africa's apartheid government of United Nations Commissioner for Namibia, Bernt Carlsson.

== PFLP-GC ==
For many months after the bombing, the prime suspects were the Popular Front for the Liberation of Palestine – General Command (PFLP-GC), a Damascus-based rejectionist group led by former Syrian army captain Ahmed Jibril, sponsored by Iran. In a February 1986 press conference, Jibril warned: "There will be no safety for any traveler on an Israeli or U.S. airliner."

Secret intercepts were reported by author, David Yallop, to have recorded the Iranian Revolutionary Guards (Pasdaran) in Baalbeck, Lebanon, making contact with the PFLP-GC immediately after the downing of the Iran Air Airbus. Israeli intelligence (Mossad) intercepted a telephone call made two days after PA 103 by Mohtashemi-Pur, Interior Minister in Tehran, to the chargé d'affaires at the Iranian embassy in Beirut, instructing the embassy to hand over the funds to Jibril and congratulating them on the success of "Operation Intekam" ('equal and just revenge'). Jibril is alleged to have received $11 million from Iran—although a banking audit trail to confirm the payment has never been presented.

Jibril's right-hand man, Hafez Dalkamoni, set up a PFLP-GC cell which was active in the Frankfurt and Neuss areas of West Germany in October 1988, two months before PA 103. During what Germany's internal security service, the Bundesamt für Verfassungsschutz (BfV), called Operation Herbstlaub ('Operation Autumn Leaves'), the BfV kept cell members under strict surveillance. The plotters prepared a number of improvised explosive devices (IEDs) hidden inside household electronic equipment. They discussed a planned operation in coded calls to Cyprus and Damascus: oranges and apples stood for 'detonating devices'; medicine and pasta for 'Semtex explosive'; and auntie for 'the bomb carrier'. One operative had been recorded as saying: "auntie should get off, but should leave the suitcase on the bus" (Duffy and Emerson 1990). The PFLP-GC cell had an experienced bomb-maker, Jordanian Marwan Khreesat, to assist them. Khreesat made at least one IED inside a single-speaker Toshiba Bombeat 453 radio cassette recorder, similar to the twin-speaker model RT-SF 16 Bombeat that was used to blow up PA 103. However, unlike the Lockerbie bomb with its sophisticated timer, Khreesat's IEDs contained a barometric pressure device that triggers a simple timer with a range of up to 45 minutes before detonation.

Unbeknown to the PFLP-GC cell, its bomb-maker Khreesat was an optician and Jordanian intelligence service (GID) agent and reported on the cell's activities to the GID, who relayed the information to Western intelligence and to the BfV. The Jordanians encouraged Khreesat to make the bombs but instructed him to ensure they were ineffective and would not explode. (A German police technician would however be killed, in April 1989, when trying to disarm one of Khreesat's IEDs). Through Khreesat and the GID, the Germans learned that the cell was surveying a number of targets, including Iberia Flight 888 from Madrid to Tel Aviv via Barcelona, chosen because the bomb-courier could disembark without baggage at Barcelona, leaving the barometric trigger to activate the IED on the next leg of the journey. The date chosen, Khreesat reportedly told his handlers, was 30 October 1988. He also told them that two members of the cell had been to Frankfurt airport to pick up Pan Am timetables.

Acting upon this intelligence, the German secret police moved in to arrest the PFLP-GC cell on 26 October, raiding 14 apartments and arresting 17 men, fearing that to keep them under surveillance much longer was to risk losing control of the situation. Two cell members are known to have escaped arrest, including Abu Elias, a resident of Sweden who, according to Prime Time Live (ABC News November 1989), was an expert in bombs sent to Germany to check on Khreesat's devices because of suspicions raised by Ahmed Jibril. Four IEDs were recovered, but Khreesat stated later that a fifth device had been taken away by Dalkamoni before the raid, and was never recovered. The link to PA 103 was further strengthened when Khreesat told investigators that, before joining the cell in Germany, he had bought five Toshiba Bombeat cassette radios from a smugglers' village in Syria close to the border with Lebanon, and made practice IEDs out of them in Jibril's training camp 20 km (12 mi) away. The bombs were inspected by Abu Elias, who declared them to be good work. What became of these devices is not known.

Some journalists such as Private Eye's Paul Foot and a PA 103 relative, Dr Jim Swire, believed that it was too stark a coincidence for a Toshiba cassette radio IED to have downed PA 103 just eight weeks after the arrest of the PFLP-GC cell in Frankfurt. Indeed, Scottish police actually wrote up an arrest warrant for Marwan Khreesat in the spring of 1989, but were persuaded by the FBI not to issue it because of his value as an intelligence source. In the following spring, King Hussein of Jordan arranged for Khreesat to be interviewed by FBI agent, Edward Marshman, and the former head of the FBI's forensic lab, Thomas Thurman, to whom he described in detail the bombs he had built. In the 1994 documentary film Maltese Double Cross, the author David Yallop speculated that Libyan agents and agents paid by Iran may have worked on the bombing together; or, that one group handed the job over to a second group upon the arrest of the PFLP-GC cell members. The former CIA head of counter-terrorism, Vincent Cannistraro, who previously worked on the PA 103 investigation, was interviewed in the film and said he believed the PFLP-GC planned the attack at the behest of the Iranian government, then sub-contracted it to Libyan intelligence after October 1988, because the arrests in Germany meant the PFLP-GC was unable to complete the operation. Other supporters of this theory believed that whoever paid for the bombing arranged two parallel operations intended to ensure that at least one would succeed; or, that Jibril's cell in Germany was a red herring designed to attract the attention of the intelligence services, while the real bombers worked quietly elsewhere.

== Iran ==
A number of journalists considered the Iranian revenge motive (retaliation for the shooting down of the Iran Air Airbus by USS Vincennes) to have been prematurely dismissed by investigators.

Abolghasem Mesbahi, former head of Iranian intelligence in Europe, eventually defected and "told [German] investigators that Iran had asked Libya and Abu Nidal, a Palestinian guerrilla leader, to carry out the attack on Pan Am 103."

The Defense Intelligence Agency (DIA) alleges that Ali Akbar Mohtashamipur (Ayatollah Mohtashemi), a member of the Iranian government, paid US$10 million for the bombing:

Ayatollah Mohtashemi: (...) and was the one who paid the same amount to bomb Pan Am Flight 103 in retaliation for the US shoot-down of the Iranian Airbus.

Part of report, which is dated 24 September 1989, cites information acquired at Ft. Meade, MD:

The mission was to blow up a Pan Am flight that was to be almost entirely booked by US military personnel on Christmas leave. The flight was supposed to be a direct flight from Frankfurt, GE, to New York, not Pan Am Flight 103 which was routed through London, UK. The suitcase containing the bomb was labeled with the name of one of the US passengers on the plane and was inadvertently placed on the wrong plane possibly by airport ground crew members in Frankfurt. The terrorist who last handled the bomb was not a passenger on the flight.

and

The bomb was designed by Mu'Ay Al-Din (Mughanniya), a Lebanese national who lives in IR and who is supposedly Iran's expert on aircraft bombing and high-jacking operations. The bomb was constructed in LY and then shipped to GE for placement on the aircraft (NFI).

In 2013 a former CIA agent told The New York Times's Robert F. Worth that "the best intelligence" supported Iran as the culprit. Although the evidence supporting it is classified, many in US intelligence believe the theory, the agent said.

== CIA drug smuggling ==
This theory suggests that U.S. Central Intelligence Agency (CIA) agents had set up a protected drug route from Europe to the United States—allegedly called Operation Corea—that allowed Syrian drug dealers, led by Monzer al-Kassar (who was involved with Oliver North in the Iran-Contra scandal) to ship heroin to the U.S. using Pan Am flights, in exchange for intelligence on Palestinian groups holding hostages in Syria. The CIA allegedly protected the suitcases containing the drugs and made sure they were not searched. On the day of the bombing, as the theory goes, terrorists exchanged suitcases: one with drugs for one with a bomb.

Time introduced another version of this theory, claiming that the American intelligence officers on PA 103—Matthew Gannon of the CIA and Maj. Charles McKee of the DIA—had found out about the drug operation, and were headed to Washington to raise their concerns about its impact on their hostage rescue plans.

Juval Aviv introduced a variation of this story in October 1989. Aviv was the owner of Interfor Inc, a private investigation company based on Madison Avenue, New York. Aviv claimed to be a former Mossad officer who led the Mossad assassination team. According to his theory, the CIA knew in advance that the baggage exchange would take place, but let it happen anyway, because the protected drugs route was a rogue operation, and Gannon and McKee were on their way to Washington to tell their superiors about it.

After PA 103, Aviv was employed by Pan Am as their lead investigator for the bombing. He submitted a report (the Interfor Report) in October 1989, blaming the bombing on a CIA-protected drug route (Barrons 17 December 1989). This scenario provided Pan Am with a credible defense against claims for compensation by relatives of victims, since, if the U.S. government had helped the bomb bypass Pan Am's security, the airline could hardly have been held liable. The Interfor report alleged among other things that Khalid Jafaar, a Lebanese-American passenger with links to Hezbollah, had unwittingly brought the bomb on board thinking he was carrying drugs on behalf of Syrian drug dealers he supposedly worked for. However, the New York court, which heard the civil case lodged by the U.S. relatives, rejected the Interfor allegations for lack of evidence. Aviv was never interviewed by either the Scottish police or the FBI in connection with PA 103. The theory of the CIA-protected suitcase was detailed as well in Patrick Pesnot's Rendez-vous avec X radio program in June 1998.

In 1990 the protected-suitcase theory was given a new lease on life by Lester Coleman in his book Trail of the Octopus. Coleman was a former journalist turned intelligence agent working with the Drug Enforcement Administration (DEA) while employed by DIA in Cyprus. Coleman claimed to have seen Khalid Jafaar in the DEA office in Nicosia, Cyprus, once again implying that Jafaar was a drug mule, but this time for the DEA instead of Syrian drug dealers. In 1997, Coleman pleaded guilty to five counts of perjury in a federal court after admitting that he submitted false testimony in civil litigation brought on behalf of the families of passengers killed in the bombing.

Coleman's theory gained impetus when British journalist Paul Foot wrote a glowing review of Coleman's book for the London Review of Books. However, on 31 March 2004—four months before his death—Foot reverted to the orthodox Iran–PFLP-GC theory in an article he wrote for The Guardian entitled "Lockerbie's dirty secret".

The previously mentioned 1994 documentary film The Maltese Double Cross—Lockerbie, which included interviews with Lester Coleman and Juval Aviv, seemed to favor a hybrid version embracing both the CIA-protected suitcase and the drug mule versions of the theory. Shortly after the film was broadcast by Channel 4 television on 11 May 1995, Aviv was indicted on fraud charges. Aviv was quick to claim that they were trumped-up, and in due course they were dropped.

== Alleged framing of Libya ==
This conspiracy theory is based on the premise that key evidence presented at the trial (e.g. timer fragment, parts from a specific radio cassette model, clothing bought in Malta, bomb suitcase originating at Luqa Airport) could have been fabricated by the U.S. and Britain for the "political" purpose of incriminating Libya.

=== Recent Libyan history ===
Muammar al-Gaddafi's regime in Libya had a long and well-documented history of support for rebel and paramilitary groups. During the 1970s and 1980s, Gaddafi supplied large quantities of Libyan weapons and explosives to the Provisional Irish Republican Army. Other incidents that have been attributed to Libya are not so clear cut:

- The 1984 murder of police constable Yvonne Fletcher outside the Libyan embassy in London was blamed on Libya and led to a long-term rupture of diplomatic relations. No prosecution has taken place, but Libya has paid compensation to WPC Fletcher's family and recently allowed Scotland Yard to interview suspects in that country.
- U.S. president Ronald Reagan was convinced that Libya was responsible for the 1986 Berlin discotheque bombing—in which 2 American servicemen were killed and another 50 injured—and, in retaliation, ordered the bombing of Tripoli in Operation El Dorado Canyon. In 2001, a Libyan and two Palestinians were convicted and imprisoned by Berlin's Supreme Court, and in 2004 Gaddafi agreed to pay $35 million in compensation to the non-American victims of the Berlin bombing.
- A French court convicted six Libyan nationals (some members of Libyan Intelligence) in absentia of the 1989 bombing of French UTA Flight 772. The bomb bore remarkable similarities to the one that brought down PA 103, since it was also consisted of PETN (Semtex) carried in a Samsonite suitcase and detonated by a timing device. France at the time supported Libya's neighbour Chad in a border dispute. With remarkable parallels to the PA 103 bombing trial, the Paris court heard that UTA 772 was brought down by a bomb triggered by a sophisticated timing device.
- Libya supplied the Provisional Irish Republican Army (PIRA) with tons of Semtex—amongst other weapons.

At the end of the Lockerbie trial an international observer appointed by the United Nations, Hans Köchler, called the verdict a "spectacular miscarriage of justice". Even though Libya never formally admitted responsibility for PA 103 or UTA 772, Libya "accepted responsibility for the actions of its officials" and agreed to pay compensation to the relatives of the victims. In October 2008 Libya paid $1.5 billion into a fund which will be used to compensate relatives of:

1. the Lockerbie bombing victims, with the remaining 20% of the sum agreed upon in 2003 ($2.7 billion);
2. the American victims of the 1986 Berlin discotheque bombing;
3. the American victims of the 1989 UTA 772 bombing; and
4. the Libyan victims of the 1986 U.S. bombing of Tripoli and Benghazi.

=== Lord Advocate's comment ===
In an address to a conference of law officers in August 2001 (seven months after the PA 103 verdict) the Scottish Lord Advocate, Lord Boyd, rejected any suggestion that Libya had been framed and denied that this was a politically driven prosecution, instead blaming conspiracy theorists for such allegations:

Conspiracy theorists have alleged that the investigators' move away from an interest in the PFLP-GC was prompted by political interference following a re-alignment of interests in the Middle East. Specifically it is said that it suited Britain and the United States to exonerate Syria and others such as Iran who might be associated with her and to blame Libya, a country which we know trained the IRA. Accordingly, evidence was "found" which implicated Libya. This is best answered by looking at the evidence.

The Lord Advocate went on to list the various pieces of evidence found to prove that the PA 103 investigators' interest in Libya was "as a result of the evidence which was discovered and not as a result of any political interference in the investigation". He reiterated: "There is no evidence whatsoever to suggest that there was political interference. The investigation was evidence-led." Lord Boyd spoke about each piece of evidence, as follows:

- Toshiba radio cassette fragment:

evidence was obtained from Toshiba [by DERA's Alan Feraday] which showed that during October 1988 20,000 black Toshiba RT-SF 16 radio cassettes, the type used in the Pan Am bomb, were shipped to Libya. Of the total world-wide sales of that model 76% were sold to the General Electric Company's subsidiary in Libya, whose chairman was Said Rashid. [information added]

- Mebo timer fragment:

In June 1990, with the assistance ultimately of the CIA and FBI, Alan Feraday of the Explosives Laboratory was able to identify the fragment as identical to circuitry from an MST-13 timer. It was already known to the CIA from an example seized in Togo in 1986 and photographed by them in Senegal in 1988. That took investigators to the firm of Mebo in Zürich. It was discovered that these timers had been manufactured to the order of two Libyans Ezzadin Hinshin, at the time director of the Central Security Organisation of the Libyan External Security Organisation and Said Rashid, then head of the Operations Administration of the ESO.

- Clothing material:

In September 1989 Tony Gauci, the shopkeeper, was interviewed by Scottish police officers. He convincingly identified a range of clothing which he had sold to a man sometime before Christmas 1988. Among the items he remembered selling were two pairs of Yorkie trousers, two pairs of striped pyjamas, a tweed jacket, a blue babygro, two slalom shirts collar size 16 and a half, two cardigans, one brown and one blue and an umbrella. He described the man, and subsequently identified him as Megrahi. More importantly at the time he was in no doubt that he was a Libyan.

Since this statement was made two of the three points have been discredited. In 2007 the Scottish Criminal Cases Review Commission granted Abdelbaset al-Megrahi's application for a new appeal against conviction, citing six points on which the Commission believed that a miscarriage of justice may have occurred. Five of the six points related to evidence demonstrating that the man who bought the clothes from Tony Gauci could not have been Megrahi. In addition, in a book published in 2016, the Scottish Justice Secretary who granted Megrahi compassionate release revealed that "Clothes in the suitcase that carried the bomb were acquired in Malta, though not by Megrahi."

The provenance of the item described as the "Mebo timer fragment" was undermined in 2012. In 1990 the fragment of printed circuit board (PCB) recovered among the Pan Am 103 wreckage was discovered by Scottish investigators to have circuitry coated with almost pure tin, consistent with the use of an amateur process known as "liquid tin". However the PCBs used in the MEBO timers were coated with a tin/lead alloy consistent with the use of the standard industrial manufacturing process. All the timer units supplied to Libya had the standard alloy coating; the fragment found at Lockerbie did not. This fact was known to the investigators and the prosecution; however, it was concealed from the trial court.

The discovery in 2013 that the bomb suitcase was on the bottom layer of luggage in the container, not the second layer, and thus that it reconciles to a suitcase seen at Heathrow airport an hour before the feeder flight from Frankfurt landed (see Iran and the Heathrow Angle below) also provides Megrahi with a solid alibi for the crime itself, as he was in Tripoli at the time the brown Samsonite hardshell appeared in the baggage container at Heathrow. Thus the Lord Advocate's 2001 statement as detailed above has been falsified in every respect other than the identity of the radio-cassette player used to conceal the bomb.

=== Reliance on forensic science ===
One of Britain's foremost criminal lawyers, Michael Mansfield QC, spoke on the BBC Scotland Frontline Scotland television episode "Silence over Lockerbie", broadcast on 14 October 1997, warning against over-reliance upon forensic science to secure convictions. He said he wanted to make just one point:

Forensic science is not immutable. They're not written in tablets of stone, and the biggest mistake that anyone can make—public, expert or anyone else alike—is to believe that forensic science is somehow beyond reproach: it is not! The biggest miscarriages of justice in the United Kingdom, many of them emanate from cases in which forensic science has been shown to be wrong. And the moment a forensic scientist or anyone else says: "I am sure this marries up with that" I get worried.

A number of news media outlets also investigated the bombing and the various theories that were put forward to explain it. One news team headed by Pierre Salinger accused the prosecution of disinformation, and of attempting to steer the investigation toward Libya.

== Iran and the London angle ==
Towards the end of the bombing trial, lawyers for Megrahi argued that the PA 103 bomb could have started its journey at Heathrow, rather than at Luqa Airport in Malta. The Boeing 747 that was destined to carry the 259 passengers and crew on the London–New York leg had arrived from San Francisco at noon on 21 December 1988, and stood unguarded on the tarmac for much of the period before PA 103's passengers began to board the aircraft after 5:00 p.m. (scheduled departure 6:00 p.m.). The Iran Air terminal in Heathrow was adjacent to the Pan Am terminal, and the two airlines shared tarmac space. The lawyers invoked the 1990 Scottish Fatal Accident Inquiry and the evidence it heard that the baggage container AVE 4041, into which the bomb suitcase had been loaded, was left unsupervised at Heathrow for about forty minutes that afternoon.

A reanalysis of the original forensic evidence published 25 years after the disaster provides strong support for the theory that the bomb was indeed introduced at Heathrow. A small number of suitcases were put into the container in question in the Heathrow terminal buildings before it was used for the transfer luggage from the Frankfurt flight. These cases covered the floor of the container but none of them were on the second layer. The 2013 analysis examined the condition of the other suitcases surrounding the explosion, the floor of the container, and the airframe under the floor, and concluded that the bomb suitcase was indeed on the bottom layer of luggage. This corresponded to a suitcase matching the description of the bomb suitcase that was seen in the container by a baggage handler at 16.45, almost an hour before the flight from Frankfurt landed. That suitcase appeared while the baggage handler was on a break and none of the staff in the shed admitted to loading it.

== Libya and Abu Nidal ==
Abu Nidal in the early 1980s

Abu Nidal was widely regarded as the most ruthless international terrorist until that mantle was assumed by Osama bin Laden. Nidal (aka Sabri al-Banna) was reported to have died in a shoot-out in Baghdad on 16 August 2002. A former senior member of his group, Atef Abu Bakr, told journalists that shortly before his death Abu Nidal had confided to Bakr that he had orchestrated the PA 103 bombing.

After settling in Tripoli in 1985, Nidal and the Libyan leader Muammar Gaddafi allegedly became close, Gaddafi sharing what The Sunday Times called "Abu Nidal's dangerous combination of an inferiority complex mixed with the belief that he was a man of destiny."

According to Atef Abu Bakr, Gaddafi asked Nidal to coordinate with the head of Libyan intelligence, Abdullah al-Senussi, an attack on the U.S. in retaliation for the 1986 bombing of Benghazi and Tripoli. Nidal then organized the hijacking of Pan Am Flight 73 in Karachi on 5 September 1986, killing 22 passengers and wounding dozens of others. In August 1987, Abu Nidal allegedly tried again, this time using an unwitting bomb mule to carry a device on board a flight from Belgrade (airline unknown), but the bomb failed to explode. For PA 103, Senussi allegedly told Nidal to supply the bomb, and Libyan intelligence would arrange for it to be put on a flight. No evidence has been produced in support of these theories.

== South-West Africa (Namibia) ==
Reuters: S. Africa Minister Denies Knowing of Lockerbie Bomb

According to another theory, suggested by former UK diplomat Patrick Haseldine, apartheid South Africa was responsible for the sabotage of PA 103. The theory is rooted in an allegation made by Die Zeit and in the film The Maltese Double Cross that the United States government knew of the bomb and warned staff from its embassies in Helsinki and Moscow, as well as a high-level South African delegation, to avoid the flight. Someone allegedly contacted the US embassy in Helsinki, Finland, 16 days before the bombing, warning of a bomb on a Pan Am aircraft departing Frankfurt for the U.S.; none of the staff at the Moscow embassy took the flight, despite it being a popular route for them over Christmas. The allegation prompted a strong statement in November 1994 from the private secretary of Pik Botha, then South African Foreign Minister, stating that "Had he known of the bomb, no force on earth would have stopped him from seeing to it that Flight 103, with its deadly cargo, would not have left the airport."

In January 2014, the satirical Private Eye magazine carried the following article about Patrick Haseldine:

Most hacks and news organisations have long blocked or junked rants from the Lockerbie-bombing conspiracy theorist Patrick Haseldine. Not so The Ecologist magazine.

Oliver Tickell, the new editor, has just published "the shocking truth" of Lockerbie by the man who styles himself "Emeritus Professor of Lockerbie Studies". Haselnut has long claimed that Pan Am 103 was blown up by the apartheid South African government in order to kill an unfortunate Swedish passenger, Bernt Carlsson, the UN Assistant Secretary-General and UN Commissioner for Namibia.

As well as aiming various far-fetched accusations over the years at people connected to the Lockerbie investigations and trials, Haseldine has also claimed that he was "nominated" for last year’s Private Eye Paul Foot Award—by which he meant he had in fact submitted his own material for consideration.

== Syria ==
In The Colonel, the fifth chapter of the 2016 documentary HyperNormalisation by Adam Curtis, it is proposed that the Reagan administration used Muammar Gaddafi as a pawn in their strategy of creating a simplified, morally unambiguous foreign policy by blaming him for the 1985 Rome and Vienna airport attacks and the 1986 Berlin discotheque bombing that killed US soldiers, both of which European security services attributed to Syrian intelligence agencies. Gaddafi is described as playing along for the sake of increasing his profile in the Arab world as a revolutionary. The 1986 United States bombing of Libya, 10 days after the disco bombing, is described as an operation carried out mainly for PR reasons, because the US and the UK needed Syria's help against Saddam Hussein.

== Review by American RadioWorks ==
In a special pre-trial report by American RadioWorks, the strengths and weaknesses of the case against Libya were explored. The report also examined in detail the evidence for and against the other main suspects in the first five alternative theories of this article.

== See also ==
- Libya and state-sponsored terrorism
- Hans Köchler's Lockerbie trial observer mission
- Korean Air Lines Flight 007 alternate theories
- Timeline of airliner bombing attacks
