= Kathleen Dalyell =

Scottish conservationist (1937–2025)

The Hon. Lady Kathleen Dalyell OBE, DL, FSAScot
- Born: Kathleen Mary Agnes Wheatley; 17 November 1937
- Died: 27 December 2025 (aged 88)
- Education: Convent of the Sacred Heart, Aberdeen
- Alma mater: Edinburgh University
- Occupations: Conservationist, public office holder
- Known for: Stewardship of The Binns
- Political party: Labour Party
- Spouse: Tam Dalyell
- Children: 1 son (1965), 1 daughter (1968)

Kathleen Mary Agnes Dalyell (/diˈɛl/ dee-EL) (née Wheatley; 17 November 1937 – 27 December 2025) was a Scottish conservationist and supporter of the Labour Party. She was the wife of Tam Dalyell, a Labour Member of Parliament (MP).

== Early career and marriage ==
Kathleen Wheatley was born in 1937. Her father was Lord Wheatley, a judge, a Lord Justice Clerk and a Labour MP. Her great-uncle was John Wheatley, a Labour MP on the left of the party, and health minister in the Ramsay Macdonald government. She was educated at the Convent of the Sacred Heart in Aberdeen before going to Edinburgh University to read history. Like her future husband, she trained to be a teacher. She taught at schools in Glasgow and Edinburgh, including a period at James Gillespie's High School, the setting for the novel The Prime of Miss Jean Brodie.

She married Tam Dalyell on Boxing Day 1963 – he was then already MP for West Lothian – and they had a son (Sir Gordon Wheatley Dalyell, now the 12th Baronet) and a daughter (Moira Shearer, née Dalyell), who are both lawyers. Kathleen Dalyell was from a staunch Roman Catholic background, and they married in St. Peter’s Catholic Church, Edinburgh, whereas her husband was associated with the Presbyterian Church of Scotland. Neither changed their religion.

== Stewardship of The Binns ==
Through the marriage she found herself the châtelaine of the Dalyell's historic family home, The Binns, a substantial 17th century house and estate in West Lothian, which she administered for the National Trust for Scotland (NTS) for 45 years. It was the only NTS property still lived in by the original family who constructed the property. She wrote a book on The Binns and worked with the NTS to ensure that sufficient visitors came to The Binns to keep the estate viable.

Her stewardship of The Binns led to her being appointed, often as chairwoman, to a string of public conservation and related bodies. These included the Historic Buildings Council, the Ancient Monuments Board, the Royal Fine Art Commission, and the Bo’ness Heritage Trust. She was a director and trustee of the Heritage Education Trust for over 20 years until 2005. She particularly enjoyed her stint on the Court of the University of Stirling from 2002. She was awarded an honorary doctorate by Stirling in 2008 in recognition of her service to the university and to civic Scotland. She was awarded Doctor honoris causa by Edinburgh University in 2006.

== Recognition ==
Dalyell was awarded an OBE in 2005 for services to the environment in Scotland, and was deputy lieutenant for West Lothian from 2001, an honorary appointment that links the West Lothian community to the Crown.

Dalyell died in December 2025 following a stroke, she was 88 years old.
