= Les Coleman =

Les Coleman may refer to:

- Lester Coleman (1943–2021), American writer
- Les Coleman (politician) (1895–1974), Australian politician
