= Allan Francovich =

American film producer

- Born: Allan James Francovich; March 23, 1941
- Died: April 17, 1997 (aged 56)

Allan James Francovich (March 23, 1941 – April 17, 1997) was an American film maker. He is best known for creating a number of films critical of the Central Intelligence Agency (CIA), linking them to terrorist attacks during the Cold War in Africa, South America and Europe. The most notable of these are the Gladio (1992) series about Operation Gladio which featured on BBC's Timewatch and The Maltese Double Cross – Lockerbie (1994) about Pan Am Flight 103.

== Background ==
Francovich was born in New York City, to a Jewish engineering family. His father, Aldo Francovich, worked as a mining engineer for Cerro de Pasco mining company in Peru; as a child he lived in high altitude mining towns and witnessed the extreme poverty of the miners. He attended an elite preparatory school in Lima then came to the U.S. to attend Notre Dame University, where he completed a B.A. He lived in Paris for several years, studying freelance at the Sorbonne before coming to Berkeley. There he finished an M.A. in Dramatic Arts at UC, Berkeley; he also studied film briefly at Stanford and received a grant to study film from the American Film Institute in 1970. He and translator and writer Kathleen Weaver were married in 1970; the two separated amicably and were divorced in 1986. She collaborated on his films during the time of their marriage.

== Lockerbie bombing ==
Allan Francovich produced, wrote and directed The Maltese Double Cross – Lockerbie, a documentary which challenged the official view that Libya was responsible for the sabotage of Pan Am Flight 103. Instead, an unwitting drug mule, with links to Hezbollah and to both the Drug Enforcement Administration (DEA) and the CIA, was argued to have carried the bomb on board the aircraft. The documentary was funded by Tiny Rowland.

When his British production company, Hemar Enterprises, released the film in November 1994, it was immediately threatened with legal action by lawyers acting for a US government official (believed to have been the DEA's Michael Hurley). Screenings of the film at the 1994 London Film Festival, at the Institute of Contemporary Arts and at several universities were prevented. But Labour MP Tam Dalyell ignored libel warnings and went ahead and showed the film at the House of Commons on November 16, 1994.

Channel 4 television decided to broadcast the film in Britain on May 11, 1995. A spokeswoman responded to critics of the decision by saying that "it needed to be shown to a wider public".

=== Letter to The Guardian ===
The day after the Channel 4 broadcast, The Guardian published a letter from Francovich headed "The Lockerbie smears":

The attacks by the UK and US authorities on my film The Maltese Double Cross (UK and US scorn Lockerbie film, May 11) are exactly what we predicted would happen. The aim is to smear people in the film in order to divert attention from the mass of evidence that supports our claims.

The film shows how Lockerbie was masterminded by Iran and Syria, not Libya, and that the bomb got on the plane through a botched US intelligence operation based on Middle East drugs and hostages. Elements within western intelligence knew what was happening but failed to act. The authorities can never admit this, as to do so would make Watergate look like a vicar's tea party.

The smears referred to have been circulating for years and have been used to attack anyone who has suggested that US government agencies have dirty hands in the affair. The latest round of attacks was begun in a letter to Tam Dalyell MP by a Todd Leventhal, of the US Information Agency, who has the Orwellian title "Program Officer for Countering Disinformation and Misinformation". It is disturbing that the supposedly independent Scottish Crown Office should choose to repeat Leventhal's allegations without question.

The full Crown Office statement states that the Lord Advocate deprecates all attempts to give a version of the Lockerbie story while criminal proceedings are pending. It goes on: "The proper place for such issues to be explored is in a criminal court."

This argument was substantially undermined on November 15, 1991, only a day after the indictments were issued against the two Libyan accused. On that day the US State Department issued "fact sheets" which detailed the evidence against the two accused. The information they contained has been repeated in numerous media reports and at least two books published in the UK since that time. One of the media reports was an item about how the Scottish and US authorities "solved" the Lockerbie case, contained in a BBC "How Do They Do That?" programme broadcast on February 15, 1994. It featured the former Chief Constable of Dumfries and Galloway, John Boyd. So far as we are aware, neither the Crown Office nor the Lord Advocate ever issued similarly critical statements against the BBC, John Boyd, or any of the other broadcasters, newspapers or book publishers which have raked over the evidence.

The British and US authorities insist that the Lockerbie case is still open. Yet during the months my team has been investigating the subject, not one approach has been made by these authorities to see any of the new evidence we have gathered. Is it any wonder that the Libyans are reluctant to stand trial in Scotland or the US?

Because of the likelihood of legal action, The Maltese Double Cross - Lockerbie has never been publicly screened in America. It can however be viewed here on the internet, by scrolling down to Allan Francovich - The Maltese Double Cross.

== Death ==
Francovich suffered a fatal heart attack in a Customs area at George Bush Intercontinental Airport in Houston, Texas, on April 17, 1997, whilst entering the United States from England; he was 56.

His films and papers are archived by the Pacific Film Archive, in Berkeley, California.

== Reception ==
John Pilger described Francovich's films as "extraordinary" political documentary films, with particular praise for The Maltese Double Cross - which "destroyed the official truth that Libya was responsible". Lee Kreindler, the head of a legal team for American families of Pan Am 103 victims, alleged that Francovich approached the American families and misrepresented himself by not mentioning the Libyan financing of the film and by saying he was a friend of John Merritt, a journalist from The Observer who had the respect of the American families. Daniel Cohen, the father of Pan Am 103 victim Theodora Cohen, said that in his eyes Francovich was "completely discredited" since Francovich did not mention the Libyan financing. Jim Swire, the head of a British Pan Am 103 family group, supported Francovich.

== Filmography ==
=== On Company Business (1980) ===
Documentary about the CIA, with exclusive use of interviews with current and former CIA employees such as David Atlee Phillips and L. Fletcher Prouty. Won the International Critics Award for Best Documentary at the Berlin International Film Festival. On Company Business was completed with funds from the International Documentary Fund, administered by the TV Lab at WNET.

=== Gladio (1992) ===
In three programmes shown over consecutive weeks in BBC2's Timewatch strand, produced by Kimi Zabihyan Observer Films, Allan Francovich interviewed key Gladio players such as Propaganda Due head, Licio Gelli, Italian neofascist and terrorist Vincenzo Vinciguerra, Venetian judge Felice Casson, Italian Gladio commander General Gerardo Serravale, Belgian Senator Roger Lallemand, Belgian gendarme Martial Lekue and former CIA director William Colby. Also included was "hoaxer" Oswald LeWinter.

=== Selected films ===
- The Lobster Pot (1973). Directed by Allan Francovich.
- Chile in the Heart (1975). Directed by Allan Francovich.
- San Francisco Good Times (1977). Directed with Gene Rosow.
- On Company Business: Inside the CIA (1980). Written and directed by Allan Francovich. Produced with Howard Dratch. OCLC 997621250.
- Short Circuit (1985). Directed by Allan Francovich. On the murder of nuns in El Salvador.
- The Houses are Full of Smoke (1987). Produced and directed by Allan Francovich. Nominated for Grand Jury Prize, Sundance Film Festival, 1988. OCLC 317357951.
  - Pt. 1: Guatemala.
  - Pt. 2: El Salvador.
  - Pt. 3: Nicaragua.
- Dark Passage (1990). Directed by Allan Francovich. Produced by Kimi Zabinhyan for Observer Films.
- "Murder in Mississippi." In: Secret History (Dec. 12, 1991). [S01E05].
- The Maltese Double Cross – Lockerbie (1994). Written and directed by Allan Francovich. online
  - Best Documentary prize, Edinburgh International Film Festival, 1995.

== Literature ==
- John Douglas-Gray in his thriller, The Novak Legacy. ISBN 978-0755213214.

== See also ==
- Daniele Ganser
- Sibel Edmonds
