= Joe Vialls =

Australian conspiracy theorist

Joe Vialls (b. c. 1944 – 17 July 2005) was an Australian conspiracy theorist and internet journalist based in Perth, Western Australia. His claims that major incidents such as the Port Arthur massacre, terror attacks in Bali and Jakarta and the 2004 Asian tsunami were the work of Israeli and American secret agents gained a measure of notoriety in Australia, America and Indonesia.

== Published work ==
Joe Vialls self-published a number of books including Deadly Deception at Port Arthur, The Murder of Policewoman Yvonne Fletcher and Lockerbie and the Bombing of Pan Am 103, and was the author of hundreds of internet articles.

Many of Vialls' investigations blamed significant world events – such as the 2004 Asian tsunami – on joint CIA–Mossad operations, and Vialls maintained in disclaimers on his site that his reports were written in the interest of public safety. In other investigations, Vialls supposedly proved that such esoteric happenings as the death of Diana, Princess of Wales and a scandal involving the wearing of a swastika by Prince Harry were Zionist plots.

It has been claimed that much of his published work is anti-Semitic and anti-American in nature.

== Three major investigations ==
1. The first major Vialls investigation was into the 1984 murder of WPC Yvonne Fletcher outside the Libyan embassy in St. James's Square. He concluded that the fatal shots had come not from within the embassy but from a penthouse flat next-door-but-one to the Libyan embassy, and were fired by CIA/Mossad agents.
2. The second investigation concerned the 1988 Lockerbie bombing together with day-by-day summaries of the Pan Am Flight 103 bombing trial. Vialls developed his own theory about the true cause of the bombing. Again, Vialls linked the CIA and Mossad to the crime.
3. The third major investigation was into the Port Arthur massacre in Tasmania, Australia. Vialls claimed that an intellectually impaired man, Martin Bryant, was wrongly convicted for this crime and did not receive a fair trial. Vialls claimed that this case, also, was an Israeli operation carried out by Mistaravim.

== Other controversies ==
Vialls was a self-proclaimed private investigator dedicated to exposing media disinformation, and made many claims in his reports disputing official explanations for events. The website thewebfairy.com wrote a comprehensive report, rebutting Vialls' claims regarding the crash of American Airlines Flight 77 into the Pentagon on 11 September 2001. The rebuttal centred mainly on Vialls' comparison of the Pentagon crash with an incident in which an Israeli El Al 747-200F cargo plane, flight 1862, crashed into a 12-story apartment block in the Amsterdam suburb of Bijlmer on 4 October 1992.

He also disputed the official explanation for the bombings of the Australian embassy and Marriott Hotel in Jakarta, Indonesia's capital. Vialls asserted that the explosives that authorities claimed were used in the Indonesian bombings were not powerful enough to have caused the damage and casualties that resulted. He claimed to demonstrate from photographs of the aftermath of each of the bombings, compared to the photographs taken in Northern Ireland where a 1,000 pound IRA bomb did not leave a crater or strip concrete from buildings, that a "micronuke" from Mossad's Dimona research and development facility in the Negev desert had been used. Vialls claims a device similar to the smallest United States nuclear weapon known as the Davy Crockett or M-388 round, a version of the W54 warhead, a very small sub-kiloton fission device, was used in the attacks. The Mk-54 weighed about 51 lb (23 kg), with a selectable yield of 10 or 20 tons, which Vialls claimed was consistent with the damage inflicted in Bali and elsewhere. A complete Mk-54 round weighed 76 lb (34.5 kg). One criticism of Vialls' theory was the absence of any radiation in Bali after the explosion. Vialls explained this flaw by arguing that Geiger counters cannot effectively detect alpha radiation, the most likely radiation to be present after the detonation of a plutonium fission bomb, since alpha particles are large and do not penetrate the walls of the Geiger-Muller tubes adequately enough to register radiation. In his investigation of the first Bali bomb, Vialls cited an opinion article in the Jakarta Post, Indonesia's largest English-language newspaper by circulation, written by an expatriate editor at the Post, which expounded a similar theory.

Vialls' theories have received popular support among leaders of some Muslim factions in Indonesia, who have cited his theories as fact. Indonesian internet forum Swara Muslim ('Muslim voice') wrote an opinion piece stating that Vialls' claim that the bombing of the Australian embassy was conducted by the CIA and Mossad was "based on solid fact." Indonesian Muslim cleric Abu Bakar Ba'asyir told Australia's ABC radio that he believed Vialls' theory regarding the first Bali bomb was a correct one.

== Death ==
After a period of illness, Vialls was reported to have died at the Royal Perth Hospital in Western Australia on 17 July 2005 of a heart attack.

== See also ==
- Alternative theories of the bombing of Pan Am Flight 103
