= John Taylor (West Lothian MP) =

British Labour Party politician (1902–1962)

Opposition Deputy Chief Whip of the House of Commons
- In office 23 October 1959 – 1 March 1962
- Leader: Hugh Gaitskell
- Preceded by: Ernest Popplewell
- Succeeded by: Edward Short

Member of Parliament for West Lothian
- In office 25 October 1951 – 1 March 1962
- Preceded by: George Mathers
- Succeeded by: Tam Dalyell

Personal details
- Born: 22 July 1902
- Died: 1 March 1962 (aged 59)
- Party: Labour

John Taylor (22 July 1902 – 1 March 1962) was a British Labour Party politician who served as member of parliament for West Lothian.

== Political career ==
He was first elected at the 1951 general election, and his death in 1962 at the age of 59 caused a hotly contested by-election, in which William Wolfe of the Scottish National Party was beaten by Labour's Tam Dalyell.

== Notes ==
Parliament of the United Kingdom
Preceded by George Mathers	Member of Parliament for West Lothian; 1951–1962	Succeeded by Tam Dalyell
Party political offices
Preceded by Ernest Popplewell	Deputy Labour Chief Whip in the House of Commons; 1959–1962	Succeeded by Edward Short
