= Oswald LeWinter =

American poet

- Born: April 2, 1931; Vienna, Austria
- Died: February 13, 2013 (aged 81); Holly Hill, South Carolina
- Occupations: Author and poet

Oswald LeWinter (April 2, 1931 – February 13, 2013) was an Austrian-born American author and poet. He was best known for his role in the October Surprise controversy.

== Background ==
LeWinter was born in Vienna, Austria. He came to the United States in 1939, as part of an effort to rescue Jewish children from the dangerous conditions of Vienna following Nazi Germany's annexation of Austria. His parents, Louis and Regina LeWinter, were able to join him in New York later that year, but a number of his uncles, aunts, and cousins remained in Europe and perished in Nazi concentration camps.

== Education ==
LeWinter grew up in Brooklyn, New York. According to one source, he became interested in poetry while attending college in the New York area, and came to know a number of well-known literary figures, including novelist Saul Bellow. In the late 1950s, LeWinter moved to California, where he completed his B.A. at the University of California, Berkeley, and his M.A. at San Francisco State College. In the early 1960s, he returned to New York and enrolled in a doctoral program at Columbia University.

== Career ==
During the early to mid-1960s, LeWinter taught at several schools in New York and Pennsylvania, including Penn State University, Columbia University, and Marist College. LeWinter's publications from this period include a book on Shakespeare, several academic articles on poetry, and his own poetry, which appeared in a number of well-known literary magazines.

In the late 1960s, however, LeWinter left academia and began a business career that lasted until the early 1980s. He eventually moved to Germany, where he taught psychology to American military personnel.

In 1984, LeWinter was arrested by German authorities for his part in a scheme to smuggle chemicals used to manufacture methamphetamine into the United States. He was extradited to the United States and sentenced to six years in prison. Released after two years, LeWinter returned to Germany, where he worked as a psychoanalyst. During his incarceration in the United States, LeWinter was only a few cells from StB agent Karl Koecher with whom LeWinter conversed frequently.

== October surprise role ==
In the late 1980s, LeWinter became a source for several writers investigating the October surprise conspiracy theory. The theory held that in late 1980, Ronald Reagan's election advisers had made an arrangement with the Iranian government. The arrangement called for the Iranians to delay the release of American diplomats held captive in Iran until after the November presidential election, in order to help Reagan defeat the incumbent President Jimmy Carter. Eventually several books were published claiming that there was indeed a conspiracy, including books by writers Barbara Honegger, Gary Sick, and Robert Parry.

While the exact details of how LeWinter became involved are not clear, according to journalist Frank Snepp, LeWinter was introduced to writer Barbara Honegger in September 1988. LeWinter presented himself as a CIA operative, and eventually claimed to have provided security for several meetings in Paris where, according to various people claiming to be witnesses, negotiations to delay the diplomats' release took place.

Martin Kilian of Der Spiegel interviewed LeWinter in September 1988 and published an article that relied upon his claim of an October meeting in Paris between CIA Director William Casey and officials from Israel and Iran.

On August 25, 1992, LeWinter was interviewed in Europe by staff of the House October Surprise Task Force. According to the Task Force's report published in January 1993, "LeWinter... stated under oath that his 'October Surprise' allegations had been a complete fabrication", including an acknowledgement that he was not a military intelligence official. The Task Force concluded its section on LeWinter: "In the final analysis the Task Force found LeWinter's recantation under oath to be far more credible, internally consistent, and logical than his myriad prior unsworn stories."

== Other claims and rebuttals ==
Following his October Surprise claims, LeWinter also appeared in two documentaries made by producer and filmmaker Allan Francovich. The first, Gladio, was a three part BBC documentary on Operation Gladio, broadcast in 1992. LeWinter is identified in the documentary as "Colonel Oswald Le Winter, CIA-ITAC liaison officer, Europe."

LeWinter appeared again in Francovich's 1994 film, The Maltese Double Cross, which blames a failed DEA drug sting for the Lockerbie crash. Despite the publication of the Joint Task Force report giving LeWinter's recantation of his CIA claims in January 1993, LeWinter is identified as "CIA, 1968-1985."

LeWinter is also mentioned in the 1998 Assassination Records Review Board report. In response to a query about whether there were records of LeWinter's CIA employment, the report states that "FBI and CIA files indicate that LeWinter is a well-known fabricator with an interest in intelligence and law enforcement activities who frequently makes claims related to sensational or unusual news events. The records that the Review Board examined did not show that Oswald LeWinter was ever employed by or worked for the CIA in any capacity."

== Fraud conviction ==
Following the death of Diana, Princess of Wales and her boyfriend Dodi Fayed in an August 1997 car accident, Fayed's father, Mohammed Al-Fayed, became convinced that their deaths were not accidental, and offered a reward for information leading to the arrest of those responsible.

LeWinter, posing as a CIA officer, offered Al-Fayed what he said were CIA documents that showed the British intelligence agency MI6 had assassinated the two. Negotiations for the documents took place in the United States and were conducted between Al-Fayed's security head John Macnamara and an American lawyer and a journalist.

When LeWinter demanded $US4 million for the documents and insisted on meeting outside the United States, Al-Fayed suspected fraud and notified the FBI, the CIA, and police in Vienna, where the meeting was to take place. Fleer and McNamara wanted to receive the documents in the United States, but the conspirators insisted on Prague for the location; Vienna was chosen instead.

When LeWinter produced the documents at the meeting in Vienna, he was arrested, but at least two others fled. The documents were judged forgeries and LeWinter was convicted of fraud. He served over two and a half years in prison, and was released in December, 2000. Karl Koecher, a friend of LeWinter, had booked the room in Bamburg at which LeWinter was staying, fled prior to any meeting between LeWinter and McNamara, and, later, denied that he had any involvement in the scheme.

Fayed hired Terry Lenzner, former assistant chief counsel for the United States Senate Watergate Committee, in the Fall of 1998 to investigate the claims of LeWinter and his associates to determine if the British government was involved in a conspiracy to assassinate Princess Diana. Describing him as a "convincing storyteller", Lenzner stated that the "evidence we collected supported the conclusion that Oswald LeWinter was not a credible source."

== Personal life ==
Oswald LeWinter was married four times and had five children.

== Death ==
LeWinter died in Holly Hill, South Carolina on February 13, 2013.

== Works by LeWinter ==
- Oswald LeWinter (1970). Shakespeare in Europe. Penguin Books. ISBN 0-14-053016-9.
- LeWinter, Oswald (August 30, 2006). More Atoms of Memory (1 ed.). Howling Dog Pr. ISBN 9781882863679.
- LeWinter, Oswald (October 1, 2007). Ages of Chaos and Fury. Ravenna Press. ISBN 9780976659389.
