= George Mathers, 1st Baron Mathers =

Scottish trade unionist and Labour Party politician

The Right Honourable The Lord Mathers KT PC DL

Comptroller of the Household
- In office 2 October 1944 – 23 May 1945
- Monarch: George VI
- Prime Minister: Winston Churchill
- Preceded by: William John
- Succeeded by: Leslie Pym

Treasurer of the Household
- In office 4 August 1945 – 30 March 1946
- Monarch: George VI
- Prime Minister: Clement Attlee
- Preceded by: Sir James Edmondson
- Succeeded by: Arthur Pearson
Parliamentary Representation
Member of the House of Lords Lord Temporal
In office 27 February 1952 – 26 September 1965; Hereditary Peerage
Member of Parliament for West Lothian
In office 23 February 1950 – 5 October 1951
| Preceded by | Constituency created |
| Succeeded by | John Taylor |
Member of Parliament for Linlithgowshire
In office 14 November 1935 – 3 February 1950
| Preceded by | Adrian Baillie |
| Succeeded by | Constituency abolished |
Member of Parliament for Edinburgh West
In office 30 May 1929 – 7 October 1931
| Preceded by | Ian MacIntyre |
| Succeeded by | Wilfrid Normand |

Personal details
- Born: 28 February 1886 Newtown St Boswells, Roxburghshire
- Died: 26 September 1965 (aged 79)
- Party: Labour
- Spouses: Edith Robinson (died 1938) Jessie Graham (m. 1940)

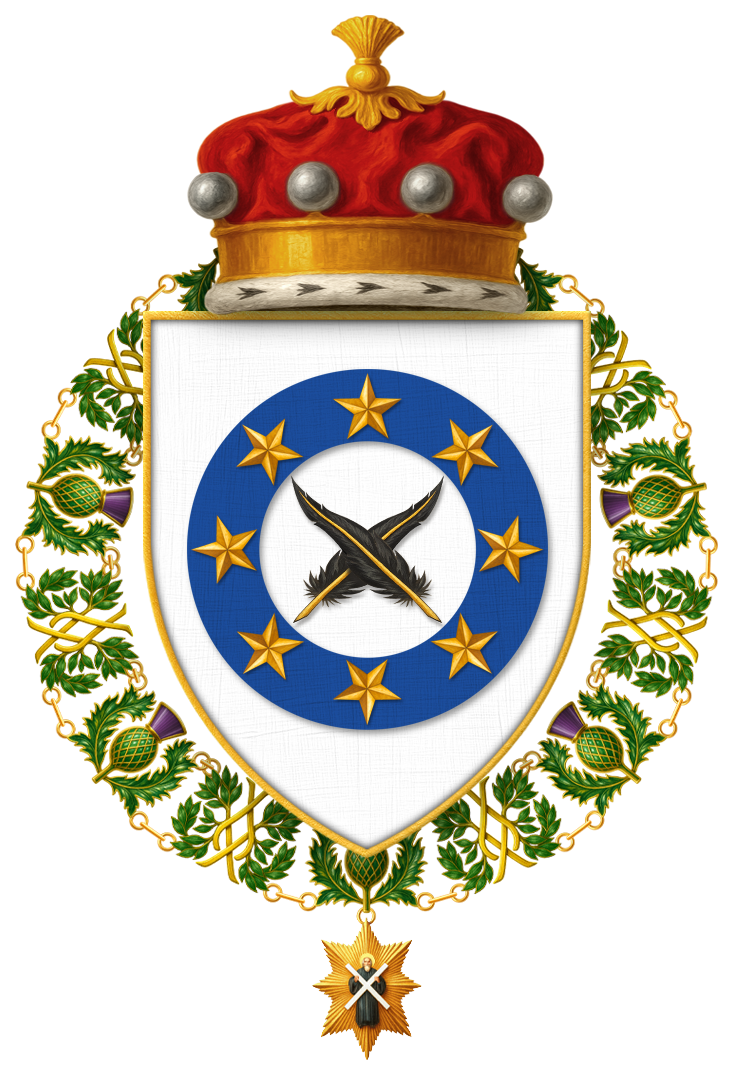
Shield of Arms of George Mathers, 1st Baron Mathers, KT, PC, DL

George Mathers, 1st Baron Mathers (28 February 1886 – 26 September 1965) was a Scottish trade unionist and Labour Party politician. He served as Comptroller of the Household from 1944 to 1945 in Winston Churchill's war-time coalition government and as Treasurer of the Household (Deputy Chief Whip) from 1945 to 1946 in Clement Attlee's post-war Labour administration.

== Background and education ==
Mathers was born in Newtown St Boswells, Roxburghshire, the son of George Mathers, JP, and Annie, daughter of James Barclay.

== Early working life and trade unionism ==
From 1899 Mathers served as a clerk with the North British Railway. He was active in the trade union and labour movement from 1908, becoming President of the Carlisle Trades Council and Labour Party from 1917 to 1920. He was elected a member of Carlisle City Council in 1919, before transferring to Edinburgh in 1921.

== Political career ==
Mathers was Chairman of Edinburgh Central Independent Labour Party and President of the Edinburgh Branch of the Scottish Home Rule Association. He unsuccessfully contested Edinburgh West in 1923 and 1924 before being elected as Member of Parliament (MP) for the seat in 1929. He lost his seat in 1931 but was returned for Linlithgowshire in 1935. He continued to hold the seat (renamed West Lothian in 1950) until he stood down at the 1951 general election.

Mathers was Parliamentary Private Secretary (PPS) to the Under-Secretary of State for India from July 1929, and transferred to same position with the Under-Secretary of State for the Colonies in November of that year (Drummond Shiels held both positions). From 1935 to 1945 he was a Scottish Labour Whip. He entered the government under Winston Churchill as Comptroller of the Household in October 1944, a post he held until the coalition government was disbanded in May 1945. When Labour came to power under Clement Attlee in July 1945, he was appointed Treasurer of the Household (Deputy Chief Whip), which he remained until April the following year. He was sworn of the Privy Council in 1947 and raised to the peerage as Baron Mathers, of Newtown St Boswells in the County of Roxburgh, on 30 January 1952, in recognition of his "political and public services". This was the last hereditary peerage created on the recommendation of a Labour Prime Minister.

Mathers was also Lord High Commissioner to the General Assembly of the Church of Scotland in 1946, 1947, 1948 and 1951, and was appointed a deputy lieutenant of Edinburgh in 1946. In 1956 he was appointed a Knight of the Thistle.

== Personal life ==
Lord Mathers married firstly Edith Mary, daughter of William Robinson, in 1916. After her death in June 1938 he married secondly Jessie, daughter of George Graham, in 1940. He died in September 1965, aged 79, when the barony became extinct.

Parliament of the United Kingdom
| Preceded by Ian MacIntyre | Member of Parliament for Edinburgh West; 1929–1931 | Succeeded by Wilfrid Normand |
| Preceded by Sir Adrian Baillie, Bt | Member of Parliament for Linlithgowshire; 1935–1950 | Constituency abolished |
| New constituency | Member of Parliament for West Lothian; 1950–1951 | Succeeded by John Taylor |
Political offices
| Preceded by William John | Comptroller of the Household; 1944–1945 | Succeeded by Leslie Pym |
| Preceded by Sir James Edmondson | Treasurer of the Household; 1945–1946 | Succeeded by Arthur Pearson |
Peerage of the United Kingdom
| New creation | Baron Mathers; 1952–1965 | Extinct |
