= Linlithgow (UK Parliament constituency) =

UK Parliament constituency (1983–2005)

- Former county constituency for the House of Commons
- Boundary of Linlithgow in Scotland for the 2001 general election

1983–2005
- Seats: One
- Created from: West Lothian
- Replaced by: Linlithgow & East Falkirk; Livingston

Linlithgow was a county constituency of the House of Commons of the Parliament of the United Kingdom from 1983 to 2005. It elected one Member of Parliament (MP) by the first past the post system of elections.

The constituency returned the same MP throughout its existence, Tam Dalyell of the Labour Party. Dalyell had previously been MP for the predecessor seat of West Lothian, which had led to his concerns about Scottish devolution being labelled "the West Lothian question".

== History ==
The constituency was created for the 1983 general election, largely replacing the previous West Lothian constituency. For the 2005 general election, Linlithgow was largely replaced by the new Linlithgow and East Falkirk constituency, with the remainder of the constituency joining Livingston.

The Scottish Parliament constituency of Linlithgow was created in 1999 with the same boundaries as the UK Parliament constituency.

== Boundaries ==
1983–1997: The West Lothian District electoral divisions of Bathgate East/Blackburn, Bathgate West/Armadale, Linlithgow, and Whitburn, and the City of Edinburgh District ward of Queensferry.

1997–2005: The West Lothian District electoral divisions of Bathgate East/Blackburn, Bathgate West/Armadale, Linlithgow/Winchburgh, and Whitburn.

== Members of Parliament ==
| Election | Member | Party |
|---|---|---|
| 1983 | Tam Dalyell | Labour |

== Election results ==
=== Elections of the 1980s ===
General election 1983: Linlithgow
| Party | Candidate | Votes | % | ±% |
|---|---|---|---|---|
| Labour | Tam Dalyell | 19,694 | 45.1 | −7.4 |
| Conservative | Colin Jones | 8,333 | 19.1 | −3.1 |
| SNP | David Ramsey | 8,026 | 18.4 | −6.3 |
| SDP | Paul Cockcroft | 7,432 | 17.0 | |
| Communist | Morag C. Parnell | 199 | 0.4 | |
| Majority | | 11,361 | 26.0 | |
| Turnout | | 43,684 | 75.2 | |
| Labour win (new seat) | | | | |

General election 1987: Linlithgow
| Party | Candidate | Votes | % | ±% |
|---|---|---|---|---|
| Labour | Tam Dalyell | 21,869 | 47.4 | +2.3 |
| SNP | Jim Sillars | 11,496 | 24.9 | +6.5 |
| Conservative | Thomas Armstrong-Wilson | 6,828 | 14.8 | −4.3 |
| SDP | Helen McDade | 5,840 | 12.6 | −4.4 |
| Communist | John Glassford | 154 | 0.3 | −0.1 |
| Majority | | 10,373 | 22.5 | −3.5 |
| Turnout | | 46,187 | 77.6 | +2.4 |
| Labour hold | | Swing | | |

=== Elections of the 1990s ===
General election 1992: Linlithgow
| Party | Candidate | Votes | % | ±% |
|---|---|---|---|---|
| Labour | Tam Dalyell | 21,603 | 45.0 | −2.4 |
| SNP | Kenny MacAskill | 14,577 | 30.3 | +5.4 |
| Conservative | Elizabeth A. Forbes | 8,424 | 17.5 | +2.7 |
| Liberal Democrats | Mike G. Falchikov | 3,446 | 7.2 | −5.4 |
| Majority | | 7,026 | 14.7 | −7.8 |
| Turnout | | 48,050 | 78.7 | +1.1 |
| Labour hold | | Swing | −0.8 | |

General election 1997: Linlithgow
| Party | Candidate | Votes | % | ±% |
|---|---|---|---|---|
| Labour | Tam Dalyell | 21,469 | 54.1 | +4.9 |
| SNP | Kenny MacAskill | 10,631 | 26.8 | −3.3 |
| Conservative | Tom Kerr | 4,964 | 12.5 | −1.2 |
| Liberal Democrats | Andrew W. Duncan | 3,796 | 8.4 | −1.1 |
| Referendum | Kenneth R. Plomer | 259 | 0.7 | New |
| Majority | | 10,838 | 27.3 | +12.6 |
| Turnout | | 39,654 | 73.8 | −4.9 |
| Labour hold | | Swing | +4.1 | |

=== Elections of the 2000s ===
General election 2001: Linlithgow
| Party | Candidate | Votes | % | ±% |
|---|---|---|---|---|
| Labour | Tam Dalyell | 17,207 | 54.4 | +0.3 |
| SNP | James Sibbald | 8,078 | 25.5 | −1.3 |
| Conservative | Gordon Lindhurst | 2,836 | 9.0 | −3.5 |
| Liberal Democrats | William Oliver | 2,628 | 8.3 | −0.1 |
| Scottish Socialist | Eddie Cornoch | 695 | 2.2 | New |
| Rock 'n' Roll Loony | Helen "Lady Muck" Cronin | 211 | 0.7 | New |
| Majority | | 9,129 | 28.9 | +1.6 |
| Turnout | | 31,655 | 58.0 | −15.8 |
| Labour hold | | Swing | −0.8 | |

Parliament of the United Kingdom
| Preceded by Old Bexley and Sidcup | Constituency represented by the father of the House; 2001-2005 | Succeeded by Swansea West |
