= Tam Dalyell =

Scottish politician (1932–2017)

Sir Tam Dalyell Bt FRSGS
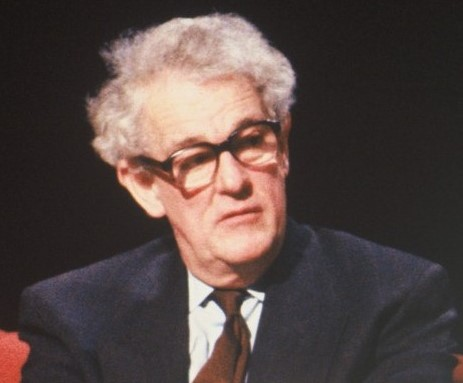
- Dalyell on After Dark in 1991

Lord Rector of the University of Edinburgh
- In office 7 March 2003 – 15 February 2006
- Preceded by: Robin Harper
- Succeeded by: Mark Ballard

Father of the House of Commons
- In office 7 June 2001 – 11 April 2005
- Speaker: Michael Martin
- Preceded by: Edward Heath
- Succeeded by: Alan Williams

Member of Parliament for Linlithgow West Lothian (1962–1983)
- In office 14 June 1962 – 11 April 2005
- Preceded by: John Taylor
- Succeeded by: Constituency abolished

Personal details
- Born: Thomas Dalyell Loch; 9 August 1932 Edinburgh, Scotland
- Died: 26 January 2017 (aged 84) West Lothian, Scotland
- Party: Labour
- Spouse: Kathleen Wheatley (m. 1963)
- Children: 2
- Education: Eton College
- Alma mater: King's College, Cambridge

Military service
- Branch/service: Royal Scots Greys; British Army
- Years of service: 1950–1952
- Rank: Trooper

Sir Thomas Dalyell, 11th Baronet (/diˈɛl/ dee-EL; 9 August 1932 – 26 January 2017), known as Tam Dalyell, was a Scottish politician who served as Member of Parliament (MP) for Linlithgow (formerly West Lothian) from 1962 to 2005. A member of the Labour Party, he was best known for formulating what came to be known as the "West Lothian question", on whether non-English MPs should be able to vote upon English-only matters after political devolution. He was also known for his staunch anti-war views, opposing the Falklands War, the Gulf War, the War in Afghanistan and the Iraq War.

== Early life and career ==
Dalyell was born in Edinburgh, and raised in the family home of his mother Eleanor Dalyell, the Binns, near Linlithgow, West Lothian; his father Gordon Loch CIE (1887–1953) was a colonial civil servant and a scion of the Loch family. Highland Clearances facilitator James Loch (1780–1855) was an ancestral uncle. Loch (and his son) took his wife's surname in 1938, and through his mother Dalyell inherited the baronetcy of Dalyell, but he never used the title.

Dalyell was educated at the Edinburgh Academy and Eton College. He did his national service with the Royal Scots Greys from 1950 to 1952, as an ordinary trooper, after failing his officer training. He then went to King's College, Cambridge, to study mathematics, but switched to history. He became chairman of the Cambridge University Conservative Association and vice-president of the Cambridge Union Society. Cambridge economist Joan Robinson encouraged him to stay for a year after completing his history degree to take an additional degree in economics, which he did and later described as "the hardest work I ever did, much harder than being a PPS". He then trained as a teacher at Moray House College in Edinburgh and taught at Bo'ness Academy for three years, and was Director of Studies on the ship school Dunera from 1961 to 1962.

In 1969 Dalyell became a columnist for New Scientist magazine, contributing Westminster Scene (later Westminster Diary) until his retirement in 2005. This provided "a conduit for researchers to speak to Parliament and vice versa", covering many subjects of public concern including industrial diseases, data protection, chemical weapons and the environment.

== Political career ==
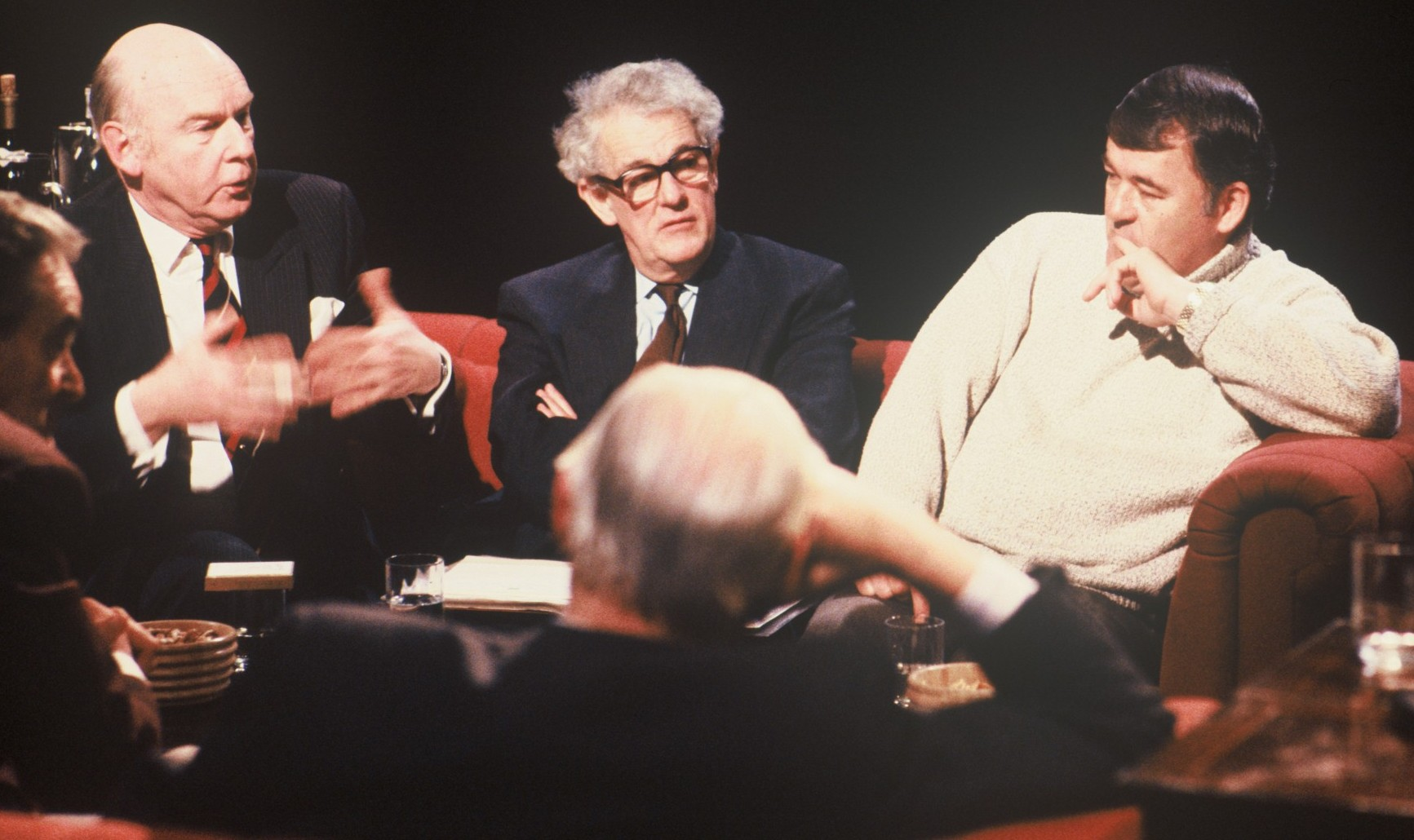
Appearing (centre) on After Dark "Arms and the Gulf" in 1991

Having been educated by left-wing economists at Cambridge, Dalyell said that he became a socialist because of the level of unemployment in Scotland. He joined the Labour Party in 1956, following the Suez Crisis. After being unsuccessful as a parliamentary candidate for Roxburgh, Selkirk and Peebles in 1959, he became a Member of Parliament in June 1962, when he defeated William Wolfe of the Scottish National Party in a hard-fought by-election for West Lothian. From 1983 onwards, he represented Linlithgow (when the new town of Livingston formed its own constituency) and easily retained the seat. He became Father of the House after the 2001 general election, when Former Prime Minister Edward Heath retired from the House of Commons. He was a nominated Member of the European Parliament from 1975 to 1979, and a member of the Labour National Executive from 1986 to 1987 representing the Campaign group.

Dalyell's independent stance in Parliament ensured his isolation from significant committees and jobs. His early career was promising and he became parliamentary private secretary (PPS) to Richard Crossman. He annoyed a number of ministers and was heavily censured by the Privileges Committee for a leak about the biological weapons research establishment, Porton Down, to the newspapers (though he said that he thought the draft minutes of the Select Committee on Science and Technology were in the public domain). When Labour were defeated in 1970, his chances of senior office were effectively over. He was opposed to Scottish devolution and was the first to come up with the "West Lothian question", although it was actually named by Conservative MP Enoch Powell. He continued to argue his own causes: in 1978–79, he voted against his own government over 100 times, despite a three-line whip.

In the 1990s, Dalyell asked the Lord Advocate, Lord Rodger of Earlsferry, to grant diplomatic immunity to Lester Coleman, a co-author of Trail of the Octopus, so that he could give evidence in the Lockerbie bombing trial in Scotland; the US Government had indictments against Coleman, accusing him of passport fraud and perjury. Allan Stewart, a former Scottish Office minister and Conservative MP for Eastwood, also said that Coleman should be granted immunity so he could testify in Scotland. The Lord Advocate rejected Dalyell's plea, saying that the Home Office and the English courts had jurisdiction over the demand of the US government's extradition demand regarding Coleman, and that the Crown Office and the Scottish Office had no authority over the case. Dalyell later said, "I had contact with Les Coleman 10 years ago. In my opinion, though he has a chequered history, I take him seriously."

Dalyell was vocal in his disapproval of actions he deemed imperialistic. Beginning with his opposition to Britain becoming involved in the Indonesia–Malaysia confrontation in 1965, he contested almost every British military intervention, arguing against Britain's involvement in the Aden Emergency, the Falklands War (especially the sinking of the General Belgrano), the Gulf War (where he declared Kuwait to be "the 19th bloody state of Iraq"), the Kosovo War and the 2003 invasion of Iraq. "I will resist a war with every sinew in my body", he said. Dalyell was also a supporter of the Chagossians in their campaign to return to Diego Garcia after being expelled in 1968. When invited by a television journalist to rank Tony Blair among the eight Prime Ministers he had observed as a parliamentarian, he cited Blair's policies in Kosovo and Iraq as reasons for placing his party leader at the bottom of the list. He was also a strong presence in Parliament concerning Libya and led no fewer than 17 adjournment debates on the Lockerbie bombing, in which he repeatedly demanded answers by the Government to the reports of Hans Köchler, United Nations observer at the Lockerbie trial.

In February 2003, he became the first Father of the House to be ordered to leave the chamber, after asking questions about the government's "dossier" on weapons in Iraq. Following his outspoken opposition to the 2003 invasion of Iraq and criticism of the Government, Downing Street suggested that he might face withdrawal of the Labour whip. In May, the American magazine Vanity Fair reported Dalyell indirectly as having said that Prime Minister Tony Blair was unduly influenced by a "cabal of Jewish advisers". He specifically named Lord Levy, who was Blair's official representative in the Middle East, and Labour politicians Peter Mandelson (whose father was Jewish) and Jack Straw (whose great-grandfather was Jewish). Mandelson said that "apart from the fact that I am not actually Jewish, I wear my father's parentage with pride". Dalyell denied accusations that the remarks were anti-Semitic. In March 2003, regarding the 2003 invasion of Iraq, Dalyell accused Blair of being a war criminal. He stated that "since Mr Blair is going ahead with his support for a US attack without unambiguous UN authorisation, he should be branded as a war criminal and sent to The Hague".

On 7 March 2003, Dalyell was elected as Rector of the University of Edinburgh. After a three-year term, he was succeeded in 2006 by Mark Ballard. It was announced on 13 January 2004 that Dalyell would not seek re-election as an MP at the next general election, and he left the House of Commons in April 2005 after 43 years as a Member of Parliament. He had been Scotland's longest-serving MP since the resignation of Bruce Millan in 1988. He was succeeded as Father of the House by Alan Williams. In 2009, The Daily Telegraph reported that Dalyell had submitted an expenses claim for £18,000 for three bookcases just two months before his retirement from the House of Commons. Dalyell claimed that this was a legitimate expense to which he was entitled; the House of Commons' Fees Office released £7,800.

Dalyell was given an honorary doctorate by Heriot-Watt University in 2011.

== Personal life and death ==
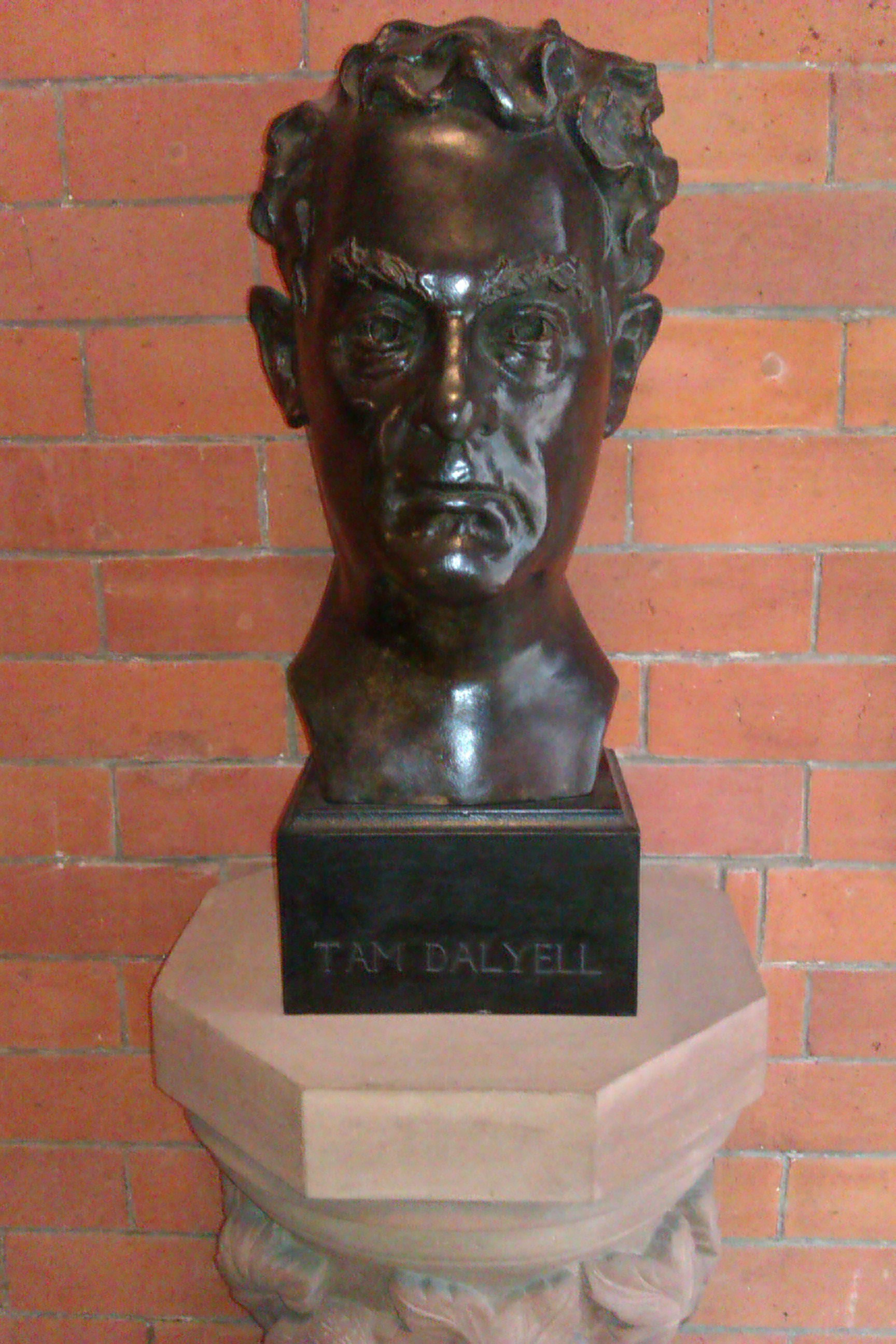
Bust of Tam Dalyell

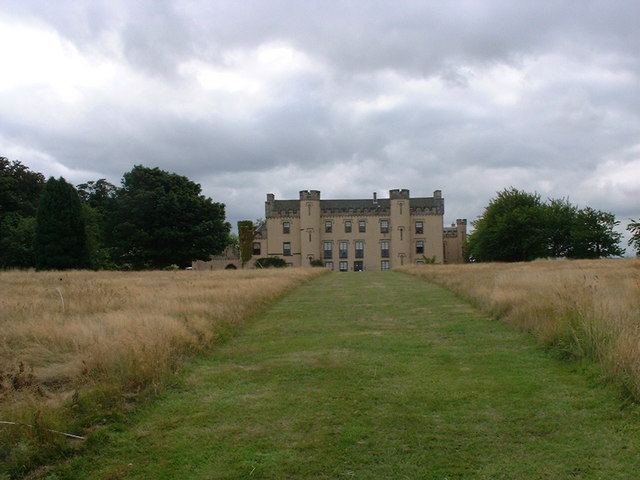
House of the Binns

Dalyell married Kathleen Wheatley, a teacher, on 26 December 1963; she was the elder daughter of John Wheatley, Lord Advocate and Labour MP for East Edinburgh. They have a son Gordon Wheatley Dalyell, and a daughter Moira, both of whom are lawyers. In his retirement, and for some years previously, he contributed obituaries to The Independent. In 2011 he published his autobiography, The Importance of Being Awkward. The dedication is "To the men and women of West Lothian – Labour, SNP, Conservative, Liberal, Communist – who, whatever their political opinions, were kind to me in all sorts of ways over 43 years as their representative in the House of Commons."

Dalyell died at the House of the Binns on 26 January 2017, at the age of 84, following a brief, undisclosed illness.

== Arms ==
Coat of arms of Tam Dalyell
Crest A dexter arms issuant from the wreath the hands grasping a scimitar proper hilted and pommelled or. Escutcheon Quarterly: 1 and 4, Sable a naked man his arms extended proper on a canton argent a sword and pistol disposed in saltire also proper (Dalziel of Binns); 2, Or a saltire engrailed sable between two swans proper naiant in fess undy azure and argent and in chief point a mullet gules for difference (Loch of Drylaw); 3, Or a bend checquy sable and argent between three buckles azure (Menteith of Auldcathie). Supporters Two lions sejant guardant Gules armed and langued azure each supporting with its interior forepaws a pavilion pole sable with rosette and pennon spike garnished or, the pennon argent with the tails of the same and sable is charged with a sword and pistol in saltire proper. Motto Above the shield (Slogan): I Dare; Below the shield: For Right & Reason Other elements Badge of a baronet of Nova Scotia Symbolism The origin of this peculiar arms was written about by Sir Robert Douglas, 6th Baronet, in 1764: The account of their origin, given by Mr. Nisbet, and other historians, is, that in the reign of King Kenneth II, a kinsman, and favourite of that king, being taken prisoner by the Picts, was put to death, and hung up upon a gallows in view of the Scotch camp. King Kenneth being highly provoked and incensed at the affront, offered a considerable reward to any of his subjects who would take down, and carry off the corpse; but, for some time, none would venture to undertake the dangerous enterprise. At last, a gentleman of more spirit and courage than the rest, said "dal zell", which, in the old Scotch language, signifies, 'I dare'. He effectually performed it to the king's satisfaction, who accordingly rewarded him nobly. His posterity assumed the word DALZELL for their surname, and that remarkable bearing of a man hanging on a gallows for their arms, with I dare for their motto, in memory of the above brave action, though they now bear only a naked man proper.

== Bibliography ==
- The Case of Ship-Schools (1960), OCLC 851703328
- Ship-School Dunera (1963), OCLC 774519818
- Devolution: The End of Britain? (1977), ISBN 9780224015592
- One Man's Falklands (1982), ISBN 9780900821653
- A Science Policy for Britain (1983), ISBN 9780582902572
- Thatcher's Torpedo (1983), ISBN 9780900821677
- Misrule (1987), ISBN 9780241121702
- Dick Crossman: A Portrait (1989), ISBN 9780297796701
- The Importance of Being Awkward: The Autobiography of Tam Dalyell (2011), ISBN 9780857900753
- The Question of Scotland ~ Devolution and After (2016), ISBN 9781780273686

== See also ==
- Hans Köchler's Lockerbie trial observer mission
- The Maltese Double Cross – Lockerbie

Parliament of the United Kingdom
Preceded by John Taylor	Member of Parliament for West Lothian; 1962–1983	Constituency abolished
New constituency	Member of Parliament for Linlithgow; 1983–2005	Constituency abolished
Preceded by Edward Heath	Father of the House; 2001–2005	Succeeded by Alan Williams
Academic offices
Preceded by Robin Harper	Rector of the University of Edinburgh; 2003–2006	Succeeded by Mark Ballard
Baronetage of Nova Scotia
Preceded by Nora Dalyell	Baronet (of Binns); 1972–2017	Succeeded by Gordon Dalyell
