= 1962 West Lothian by-election =

UK parliamentary by-election

The 1962 West Lothian by-election was a UK Parliamentary by-election held for the constituency of West Lothian in Scotland on 14 June 1962, following the death of sitting MP, John Taylor. The by-election saw the election of Tam Dalyell, who went on to become a long-standing and controversial MP. Additionally, the Scottish National Party had a surprisingly strong showing—their candidate, William Wolfe, became the party leader for several years.

Candidates from the Liberal and Conservative parties both lost their deposits. It was the first deposit lost by the Conservatives in Scotland since 1920.

== Result ==
1962 West Lothian by-election
Party	Candidate	Votes	%	±%
Labour	Tam Dalyell	21,266	50.82	−9.47
SNP	William Wolfe	9,750	23.30	New
Unionist	W. I. Stewart	4,784	11.43	−28.28
Liberal	D. Bryce	4,537	10.84	New
Communist	Gordon McLennan	1,511	3.61	New
Majority		11,516	27.52	+6.94
Turnout		41,848		
Labour hold		Swing		
