= Dieter Bock =

German businessman (1939–2010)

- Born: 3 March 1939; Dessau
- Died: 12 May 2010 (aged 71); Hamburg
- Occupation: Businessman
- Years active: 1973–2010
- Known for: Ousting Tiny Rowland from Lonrho

Dieter Bock (3 March 1939 – 12 May 2010) was a German lawyer and tax consultant turned businessman.

Bock was the son of a director of the AGFA film factory in Wolfen. In 1953, his family fled from East Germany and settled in Munich. He studied law at the Philipps University of Marburg. In 1973 Bock founded a tax consultancy and began to invest in real estate and investments. In 1974, looking for business premises to rent, he persuaded his would-be landlords to sell him an old building in Schwabing. He converted the building into a commercial building, where he initially housed his company Bilanz und Steuer AG (bistag), but sold it a few years later at a high profit. The company still exists today with its headquarters in Frankfurt am Main and a branch in Halle (Saale).

In the following years, Bock switched to real estate trading and stock speculation and expanded his activities to include The Netherlands, the United States and South Africa. In 1986, he consolidated his companies in the real estate holding Advanta Management. In 1988, he acquired ten percent of the shares in the construction company Philipp Holzmann, a little later he bought into Dywidag and Tilbury Douglas in order to sell all his holdings a short time later at a high profit. He then joined the Canadian real estate holding Trizec Hahn, one of the largest North American real estate companies, as a partner.

In his last few decades, Bock concentrated on the hotel sector. Through his holding company, he was a long-term shareholder in the Hamburg Hotel Atlantic, which lost its five-star rating in 2008, as well as membership of the Leading Hotels of the World association.

Bock owned the South African soccer team Moroka Swallows from 1998 until 2010.

Bock was married with four children and lived in seclusion in London and Darmstadt. He was rarely photographed, rarely gave interviews and was therefore often compared to the ALDI brothers. His modest appearance contributed to Bock's special reputation: suits from C&A, plastic bags instead of briefcases, pasta his favorite meal (with which he drank Château Pétrus wines).

He was part of the supervisory board of Advanta Management, a key investor in the construction group Philipp Holzmann and the largest investor in the Kempinski hotel chain.

Bock choked to death in the Atlantic Kempinski luxury hotel in Hamburg at the age of 71.
