= West Lothian (UK Parliament constituency) =

Parliamentary constituency in the United Kingdom, 1950–1983

- Former county constituency for the House of Commons
- Subdivisions of Scotland: Linlithgowshire

1950–1983
- Seats: One
- Created from: Linlithgowshire
- Replaced by: Linlithgow; Livingston; Falkirk East

West Lothian was a Scottish county constituency of the House of Commons of the Parliament of the United Kingdom from 1950 to 1983. Its area corresponded to the Council area of West Lothian. It elected one Member of Parliament (MP) by the first past the post voting system.

The constituency is best known for its third and final MP, Tam Dalyell of the Labour Party, whose concerns about Scottish devolution were labelled "the West Lothian question".

== History ==
West Lothian was created for the 1950 general election, partly replacing the previous Linlithgowshire constituency.

With effect from the 1983 general election, it became two different constituencies: Linlithgow and Livingston.

== Members of Parliament ==
Election	Member	Party	Notes
1950	George Mathers	Labour	later Baron Mathers
1951	John Taylor	Labour	
1962 by-election	Tam Dalyell	Labour	subsequently MP for Linlithgow
1983	constituency abolished: see Linlithgow		

== Election results ==
=== Elections in the 1950s ===
1950 general election: West Lothian
Party	Candidate	Votes	%	±%
Labour	George Mathers	27,236	60.61	
Unionist	W M Younger	15,999	35.60	
Scottish Self-Government	Maxwell Hynd	1,039	2.31	
Communist	J Borrowman	664	1.48	
Majority		11,237	25.01	
Turnout		44,938	79.76	
Registered electors		56,339		
Labour win (new seat)				

1951 general election: West Lothian
Party	Candidate	Votes	%	±%
Labour	John Taylor	28,906	60.52	−0.09
Unionist	Humphrey Atkins	18,854	39.48	+3.88
Majority		10,052	21.04	−3.97
Turnout		47,760	84.89	+5.13
Registered electors		56,259		
Labour hold		Swing	−1.99	

1955 general election: West Lothian
Party	Candidate	Votes	%	±%
Labour	John Taylor	25,654	59.66	−0.86
Unionist	William R Grieve	17,347	40.34	+0.86
Majority		8,307	19.32	−1.72
Turnout		43,001	75.38	−9.51
Registered electors		57,045		
Labour hold		Swing	−0.86	

1959 general election: West Lothian
Party	Candidate	Votes	%	±%
Labour	John Taylor	27,454	60.29	+0.63
Unionist	W Ian Stewart	18,083	39.71	−0.63
Majority		9,371	20.58	+1.26
Turnout		45,537	77.90	+2.52
Registered electors		58,457		
Labour hold		Swing	+0.63	

=== Elections in the 1960s ===
1962 West Lothian by-election
Party	Candidate	Votes	%	±%
Labour	Tam Dalyell	21,266	50.82	−9.47
SNP	William Wolfe	9,750	23.30	New
Unionist	W. I. Stewart	4,784	11.43	−28.28
Liberal	D. Bryce	4,537	10.84	New
Communist	Gordon McLennan	1,511	3.61	New
Majority		11,516	27.52	+6.94
Turnout		41,848		
Labour hold		Swing		

1964 general election: West Lothian
Party	Candidate	Votes	%	±%
Labour	Tam Dalyell	24,933	50.32	−9.97
SNP	William Wolfe	15,087	30.45	N/A
Unionist	RA Gordon Stuart	8,919	18.00	−21.71
Communist	Irene Swan	610	1.23	N/A
Majority		9,846	19.87	−0.71
Turnout		49,549	79.50	+1.60
Registered electors		62,328		
Labour hold		Swing	−20.21	

1966 general election: West Lothian
Party	Candidate	Votes	%	±%
Labour	Tam Dalyell	26,662	52.37	+2.05
SNP	William Wolfe	17,955	35.27	+4.82
Conservative	David L MacKinnon	5,726	11.25	−6.75
Communist	Irene Swan	567	1.11	−0.12
Majority		8,707	17.10	−2.77
Turnout		50,910	79.59	+0.09
Registered electors		63,967		
Labour hold		Swing	−1.39	

=== Elections in the 1970s ===
1970 general election: West Lothian
Party	Candidate	Votes	%	±%
Labour	Tam Dalyell	29,360	52.9	+0.5
SNP	William Wolfe	15,620	28.2	−7.1
Conservative	Michael Ancram	10,048	18.1	+6.9
Communist	Christopher Bett	459	0.8	−0.3
Majority		13,740	24.7	+7.6
Turnout		55,487	76.7	−2.9
Registered electors		72,366		
Labour hold		Swing	+3.8	

February 1974 general election: West Lothian
Party	Candidate	Votes	%	±%
Labour	Tam Dalyell	28,112	45.3	−7.6
SNP	William Wolfe	21,690	35.0	+6.8
Conservative	Alexander Pollock	11,804	19.0	+0.9
Communist	Christopher Bett	438	0.7	−0.1
Majority		6,422	10.3	−14.4
Turnout		62,044	80.6	+3.9
Registered electors		76,946		
Labour hold		Swing	−7.2	

October 1974 general election: West Lothian
Party	Candidate	Votes	%	±%
Labour	Tam Dalyell	27,687	45.3	±0.0
SNP	William Wolfe	24,997	40.9	+5.9
Conservative	Anthony Lester	6,086	10.0	−9.0
Liberal	Hector MacAulay	2,083	3.4	New
Communist	Christopher Bett	247	0.4	−0.3
Majority		2,690	4.4	−5.9
Turnout		61,100	78.8	−1.8
Registered electors		77,527		
Labour hold		Swing	−3.0	

1979 general election: West Lothian
Party	Candidate	Votes	%	±%
Labour	Tam Dalyell	36,713	54.9	+9.6
SNP	William Wolfe	16,631	24.9	−16.0
Conservative	John Roderick Whyte	13,162	19.7	+9.7
Communist	William Sneddon	404	0.6	+0.2
Majority		20,082	30.0	+25.6
Turnout		66,910	78.1	−0.7
Registered electors		85,645		
Labour hold		Swing	+22.8	

== See also ==
- West Lothian question
