= Trail of the Octopus (book) =

Book by Lester Coleman and Donald Goddard

Trail of the Octopus: From Beirut to Lockerbie – Inside the DIA
- Author: Lester Coleman; Donald Goddard
- Language: English
- Genre: Non-fiction
- Publisher: Bloomsbury Publishing
- Publication date: 1993
- Publication place: United Kingdom

Trail of the Octopus: From Beirut to Lockerbie – Inside the DIA is a book co-written by Lester Coleman and Donald Goddard. It received its United Kingdom publication in 1993 and its first United States publication in 2009. Coleman wrote that terrorists had infiltrated a Drug Enforcement Administration (DEA) operation outside of the United States and, because of incompetence on part of the DEA, were able to smuggle a bomb on Pan Am 103. Coleman said "No one knows what is really going on. If they ever did, it would make Watergate look like Alice in Wonderland." In the book Coleman accused Micheal Hurley – the head of the Drug Enforcement Administration's (DEA) operations in Nicosia, Cyprus – of being the primary figure of responsibility of a coverup of the actual causes of the crash; Coleman also accused Martz and another Atlanta Journal-Constitution journalist, Lloyd M. Burchette, Jr., of being involved in a coverup. In the book Coleman also claims he sought, and was granted, political sanctuary in Sweden and further claims in the book that after he was under Swedish protection he provided Pan American World Airways with a civil affidavit which cleared Pan Am of full responsibility for the Pan Am Lockerbie bombing.

Bloomsbury published Coleman's book in the United Kingdom. Christopher Byron of New Yorker said that Coleman chose to have the book published in the UK because "negative publicity ruined the book market for him in the U.S." Byron said that attempts by Bloomsbury to sell the book in the United States "seem to have failed." A spokesperson for Bloomsbury stated that she had "complete confidence" in Coleman's statements. According to Byron, after a series of interviews with people mentioned in the book, he could not find any who had been contacted by Bloomsbury about their role in the book.

Hurley sued Bloomsbury in a London court. The DEA head and the book's publisher agreed to settle. The settlement papers of the publishers stated that remaining copies of the book had been destroyed. In addition, The Mobile Register stated that the book publishers admitted that Coleman's statements against Hurley had no truth and paid Hurley's legal fees and an additional undisclosed sum.

As of 2013 the book is published by BookSurge.

== Reception ==
Alasdair Palmer of The Spectator wrote that the authors do not present sufficient evidence and that they do not defend the theories they espouse in the book; according to Palmer, instead they attack the people they oppose.

== See also ==
- Pan Am Flight 103 conspiracy theories
