= Tiny Rowland =

British businessman (1917–1998)

- Born: Roland Walter Fuhrhop; 27 November 1917; Calcutta, Bengal, British India
- Died: 25 July 1998 (aged 80); London, England
- Education: Churcher's College
- Occupation: Businessman
- Known for: Corporate raiding
- Spouse: Josie Taylor (m. 1968)
- Children: 4
- Relatives: Plum Sykes (daughter-in-law)

Roland Walter "Tiny" Rowland (né Fuhrhop; 27 November 1917 – 25 July 1998) was a British businessman, corporate raider and the chief executive of the Lonrho conglomerate from 1962 to 1993. He gained fame from a number of high-profile takeover bids, in particular his attempt to take control of Harrods. He was known for his complex business interests in Africa and his closeness to a number of African leaders.

== Early life ==
He was born Roland Walter Fuhrhop on 27 November 1917 during World War I in a British internment camp for aliens outside Calcutta, India. His mother was Anglo-Dutch and his father, Wilhelm Fuhrhop, was a German export-import trader in Calcutta. Having been born in British India, he was automatically a British subject, by the principle of jus soli. However, his parents remained "enemy aliens" for the duration of the First World War, and after the war, the Fuhrhops were refused entry into the United Kingdom. They settled in Hamburg, Germany.

He was said to have been nicknamed "Tiny" by his nanny because he was a large child. In the 1930s, he was briefly involved with the Hitler Youth, but his father was firmly opposed to Hitler and moved his family to Britain in 1937 to escape Nazi Germany.

He was sent to England, where he attended Churcher's College in Hampshire and acquired an upper-class British accent and mannerisms. His family settled in England in 1937.

He then worked for his uncle's shipping business in the City of London. He took his uncle's surname, Rowland, shortly after the outbreak of the Second World War. He was conscripted into the British Army, where he served with the Royal Army Medical Corps. As enemy aliens, his parents were interned on the Isle of Man, where his mother died. He himself was interned as an enemy alien after trying to arrange for the release of his father.

== Lonrho ==
In 1948, Rowland moved to Southern Rhodesia, where he subsequently managed a tobacco farm at Eiffel Flats, Mashonaland West province. From 1952 to 1963, he lived with Irene Smith, the wife of a business partner.

Rowland was recruited to the London and Rhodesian Mining and Land Company, later Lonrho, as chief executive in 1962. Under his leadership, the firm expanded beyond mining and became a conglomerate, dealing in newspapers, hotels, distribution, textiles and many other lines of business.

During 1973, Rowland's position was the subject of a High Court case in which eight Lonrho directors sought Rowland's dismissal, due to both his temperament and to claims he had concealed financial information from the board. Rowland failed in his legal attempt to block the move but was subsequently backed by shareholders and retained his position. British Prime Minister Edward Heath, referring to the case, criticised the company in the House of Commons and described events there as "the unpleasant and unacceptable face of capitalism".

In 1983, Rowland took over The Observer newspaper and became its chairman. He also campaigned to gain control of Harrods department store in Knightsbridge, but he was defeated by Mohamed Al-Fayed. Rowland described his relationship with the Fayed family in his book A Hero from Zero. He started with the following words:

In Spring 1985, the three Fayed brothers acquired House of Fraser. They did so despite detailed allegations by Lonrho as to their unsavoury character and the fabrications as to their origins and wealth which they had invented to present themselves in a falsely favourable light.

The rest of the book set out to justify these statements.

A December 1993 Financial Times article revealed that Hemar Enterprises, makers of documentary film The Maltese Double Cross – Lockerbie, was owned by Metropole Hotels, controlled by Rowland. The film stated that Libya had no responsibility for the bombing of Pan Am Flight 103. Shortly after the indictment of Libya in the Pan Am Flight 103 incident, Rowland sold a percentage of his interests to the Libyan Arab Foreign Investment Company (Lafico), controlled by the government of Libya. For this reason, Susan and Daniel Cohen, parents of Pan Am Flight 103 victim Theodora Cohen, claimed that Libya had backed the film.

In a boardroom coup engineered by German tycoon Dieter Bock in October 1993, Rowland was forced to step down as chairman of Lonrho. He was succeeded by former diplomat Sir John Leahy. In March 1995, he was dismissed by the board. The Cohens' conjecture regarding Rowland's association with Muammar al-Gaddafi, the leader of Libya, and the film The Maltese Double Cross – Lockerbie contributed to the decision to dismiss Rowland.

In 1996, President Nelson Mandela awarded Rowland the Order of Good Hope, the highest South African honour.

== Personal life and death ==
Rowland met Josie Taylor in 1965 and married her in 1968. They remained married until Rowland's death in 1998. They had four children, including Toby Rowland, who would eventually co-create the video game company King in 2003.

== See also ==
- The Maltese Double Cross – Lockerbie (film)

== Bibliography ==
- Tom Bower: Tiny Rowland. A Rebel Tycoon. London, Heinemann, 1993. ISBN 0-434-07339-3
- Richard Hall: My life with Tiny. A biography of Tiny Rowland. London, Faber & Faber, 1987. ISBN 0-571-14737-2
