= Lester Coleman =

American writer (1943–2021)

Lester Knox Coleman III (September 25, 1943 – August 15, 2021) was an American who was the co-author of the 1993 book Trail of the Octopus: From Beirut to Lockerbie – Inside the DIA, in which he claimed that a secret drug sting enabled terrorists to evade airport security in the 1988 terrorist bombing of Pan American World Airways Flight 103. Coleman claimed he was at one point employed by the United States Drug Enforcement Administration (DEA). Coleman further alleged that a compromised American covert drug-operation allowed Iranian-backed terrorists – the PFLP-GC, led by Ahmed Jibril – to slip a Semtex bomb aboard the plane. On September 11, 1997, Coleman stated to a New York Federal court that "...he lied when he claimed that a secret drug sting enabled terrorists to evade airport security in the bombing..." In a plea agreement, Coleman was sentenced to time served, which was five months, and six months' home confinement under electronic monitoring. Conspiracy theories alleging that the federal convictions of Lester Coleman were an effort to silence him and to hide the truth about Pan Am Flight 103 circulated around the internet.

== Background ==
Coleman's hometown was Panama City, Florida. According to one source, Coleman once served as a news director for WSGN radio in Birmingham. In 1985, he worked as a correspondent for the Christian Broadcasting Network in the Middle East. CBN later closed its Beirut bureau, and Coleman was no longer employed by CBN. He also worked as a public relations employee of the Boy Scouts of America in Chicago.

According to Atlanta Journal-Constitution journalist Ron Martz, in the 1980s, Lester Coleman frequently traveled through Lebanon and other parts of the Middle East and worked as a journalist, primarily in television. Coleman had a Lebanese wife. According to Martz, Coleman frequently used the pseudonym "Collin Knox" while publishing some works. Tom Silewski, the managing editor of Soldier of Fortune magazine, said that Coleman used the alias Colin Knox when writing two stories for the magazine. Micheal Hurley, the head of the Drug Enforcement Administration's (DEA) operations in Nicosia, Cyprus, said that Coleman worked as an overseas informant for the DEA. Joe Boohaker, a Birmingham, Alabama man who served as Coleman's defense attorney, said that Coleman worked for the Defense Intelligence Agency and checked on the DEA's operations.

== Pan American 103 statements ==
Although the Time magazine article on the crash of Pan Am Flight 103, "Pan Am 103 Why Did They Die?," states that Coleman was a Defense Intelligence Agency (DIA) agent, a later article in the American Journalism Review disputes that he ever worked for that agency.

Coleman said he left the U.S. Embassy in Cyprus in 1988 and claims in his book that he was not engaged by the DIA again until 1990. According to him, he was told to apply for a passport using a former false identity used primarily for work with the DIA. That identity was to be a man named Thomas Leavy. In May 1990, as he prepared for his unknown job, Coleman was arrested by the FBI and charged with applying for a false passport.

In 1990 Coleman was a resident of Mobile, Alabama. During that year, a Chicago, Illinois grand jury indicted Coleman on passport fraud charges. The government accused Coleman of gaining a passport under the name of a newborn baby who died years prior to the application. According to Redding Pitt, a federal government attorney from Montgomery, Alabama, Coleman missed the bail hearing and appeared in Europe. While away from the United States, Coleman sought asylum in Sweden, though Sweden denied his residency application. Coleman accused the federal government of prosecuting him to try to silence Coleman's knowledge of the crash of Pan Am Flight 103.

=== ABC and NBC programs and TIME article ===
In October 1990, ABC News and NBC News broadcast programs that used Coleman's version of the Pan Am incident. Their stories at that time did not identify any sources by name, but 18 months later, on April 20, 1992, TIME published a story on Pan Am 103, titled "Pan Am 103 Why Did They Die?," using Coleman's version of the events and directly naming Coleman as a source. After the publication of the article, Steven Emerson, an investigative reporter for CNN, wrote a story for the Washington Journalism Review criticizing the Time story. The Time article that used Coleman's thesis included a photograph of Michael Schafer, a 39-year-old man from Atlanta; Coleman said that the photograph of Schafer represented a CIA double agent, David Lovejoy. Schafer had worked for Coleman in Beirut for six months in 1985, and Schafer was the best man at Coleman's wedding. After Schafer was recognized, Coleman said that he was trying to expose Schafer as being the same person as Lovejoy. As a result of the publication of the photograph, a $26 million libel suit was filed against the magazine.

=== Trail of the Octopus ===
Coleman and Donald Goddard co-wrote Trail of the Octopus, which received its United Kingdom publication in 1993 and its first United States publication in 2009. Coleman wrote that terrorists had infiltrated a Drug Enforcement Administration (DEA) operation outside of the United States and, because of incompetence on the part of the DEA, were able to smuggle a bomb on Pan Am 103. Bloomsbury published Coleman's book in the United Kingdom. Hurley sued Bloomsbury in a London court. The resulting settlement papers from the publisher stated that remaining copies of the book had been destroyed. In addition, The Mobile Register stated that the book publishers admitted that there was no truth to Coleman's claims and paid Hurley's legal fees and an additional undisclosed sum. As of 2013 the book is published by BookSurge.

=== Pan Am civil suit ===
In 1991, as part of a civil suit between Pan American World Airways and the families of Flight 103 victims, Lester Coleman made a sworn statement accusing the Drug Enforcement Administration of allowing PA103 to be bombed; his allegations were reported internationally. The federal court imposed a gag order on the defendants and plaintiffs in the Pan Am case. Christopher Byron of New York magazine said that members of the defense "appear to have repeatedly" violated the court-imposed gag. Byron argued that the Pan Am Time magazine story was possibly a leak. The lawyers of the plaintiffs complained, saying that the Time story was leaked in violation of the gag order. Lee Kriendler, the lawyer for the plaintiffs, accused the defense of using the Time story to influence the jury. On July 11, 1992, the federal jury ruled that Pan Am was guilty of misconduct, in favor of the plaintiffs. In court, Pan Am did not specifically mention the Coleman drug theory during the court proceedings. Kriendler said this was because "[t]hey knew we would have taken them apart if they had."

=== Perjury accusation, asylum, attempted U.S. extradition ===
The U.S. government indicted Coleman on perjury charges, accusing him of making false statements in an affidavit supporting Pan Am's claims against the Federal Government of the United States in a Pan Am 103 civil suit. Joe Boohaker, Coleman's defense attorney, said that the filing of criminal charges based on the course of a civil suit was "the most unusual thing" he had ever encountered.

Coleman, at the time, was an asylum-seeker in Sweden. During this time, the Federal Bureau of Investigation sent letters to the Swedish Government, requesting Coleman's extradition request to Sweden.

Tam Dalyell, a Labour Party Member of Parliament from Linlithgow, asked the Lord Advocate, Lord Rodger of Earlsferry, to grant diplomatic immunity to Lester Coleman, so he could give evidence in the Lockerbie bombing trial in Scotland. Allan Stewart, a former Office Minister of Scotland and a Conservative Party MP for Eastwood, also said that Coleman should be granted immunity, so he could testify in Scotland. The Lord Advocate rejected Dalyell's plea, saying that the Home Office and the English courts have the jurisdiction over the demand of the U.S. government's extradition demand regarding Coleman, and that the Crown Office and the Scottish Office had no authority over the case.

According to Redding Pitt, Coleman called Governor of Alabama Fob James, an acquaintance of Coleman from the 1970s, for help in his case. James helped arrange Coleman's State of Alabama-paid voluntary return to the United States. Boohaker said that James apparently knew Coleman from his radio days. Upon Coleman's return, federal agents in Atlanta, Georgia arrested Coleman.

On Thursday, September 11, 1997, Coleman pleaded guilty to the five counts of perjury and signed a public apology. Coleman's plea agreement stated that his claim that the U.S. defense and intelligence agencies authorized him to obtain a false passport was not true, that he lied in his Pan Am testimony in order to bolster his image as an international security and terrorism consultant and to obtain money, and that he wanted revenge against the DEA because the DEA had fired him. Coleman's prosecutors recommended a sentence of time served, five months in prison, and six months of home confinement. Coleman later claimed to have signed the statement under duress.

Coleman's highest possible sentence could have been 25 years in prison. In 1998, he was sentenced to three years of supervised release. In addition, federal district court judge Thomas Platt fined Coleman $30,000 ($59258.88 in today's currency). By that year, Coleman became a morning talk show host in a Lexington, Kentucky radio station.

== State charges, federal and state incarceration ==
In 2000, the State of Kentucky charged Coleman with 36 counts of criminal possession of a forged instrument and one count of being a persistent felony offender. The forged instrument charges originate from the state's accusation that Coleman used his computer to print forged checks and stole money from the Central Bank and two individuals. On March 16, 2000, a jury in Fayette County, Kentucky convicted Coleman of the 36 counts of criminal possession of a forged instrument; he was not convicted on the count of being a persistent felony offender. The jury recommended a four-year prison sentence.

In 2000 Coleman received a 10-year prison sentence from the state, and for that he was immediately put on state probation. Coleman was transferred into federal custody because the federal government had accused him of violating the terms of his probation regarding his perjury conviction. Lester Coleman, Federal Bureau of Prisons (BOP)#47321-019, was released from BOP custody on December 7, 2000. In May 2003 Coleman was arrested in Panama City, Florida, his hometown. On Friday May 23, 2003, Coleman admitted in the Fayette Circuit Court that he had violated the terms of his state probation by leaving the state without the probation officer's permission and not paying restitution to his victims who individually lost over $10,000 ($18695.65 in today's currency). Thomas Clark, the circuit judge, immediately sent Coleman to prison.

In 2004 Coleman, in a federal court, sued the Commonwealth of Kentucky, Fayette County, Kentucky commonwealth attorney Ray Larson, and Mayor of Lexington "Rebecca" Isaac, accusing them of violating his constitutional rights. Coleman said that judge Clark had violated his rights by giving him 10 years instead of the jury's recommended four; Coleman did not mention the probation that the judge had included in the sentence. One week after Coleman filed the suit, Joseph M. Hood, the district court judge, dismissed Coleman's suit without taking input from any of the defendants because he found Coleman's suit to be severely deficient. Hood said that Coleman failed to demonstrate that legal necessities needed to pursue his claim had existed; a declaration from a state tribunal that Coleman's conviction was invalid or a federal writ of habeas corpus would have been filed that challenges the conviction would have fulfilled the requirement. Hood also said that Coleman failed to demonstrate how Isaac, Larson, and others had anything to do with his sentencing.

== Reception ==
Tam Dalyell said "I had contact with Les Coleman 10 years ago. In my opinion, though he has a chequered history, I take him seriously."

Daniel Cohen, the father of Pan Am 103 victim Theodora Cohen, said that Coleman was a "conman." This critical view was shared by veteran DEA agent Micheal Hurley, who had extensive dealings with Coleman.

== See also ==
- Pan Am Flight 103 conspiracy theories
