= Dalziel =

Dalziel, Dalzell, Dezell, or Dalyell (/diˈɛl/ dee-EL) is a Scottish surname.

== Pronunciation ==
The unintuitive spelling of the name is due to it being an anglicisation of Scottish Gaelic Dail-gheal, meaning 'bright dale'. The sound now spelled with a ⟨y⟩ or ⟨z⟩ is historically a lenited slender /ɡ/, which in Gaelic is pronounced [j] (like English ⟨y⟩). The English/Scots form of the name was originally spelled with a yogh (ȝ) as Dalȝiel; this was later replaced with either a ⟨z⟩, the letter of the modern alphabet which most looks like yogh, or a ⟨y⟩, which more closely represents the sound.

== History ==
The name originates from the former barony of Dalzell in Lanarkshire, in the area now occupied by Motherwell. The name Dalzell is first recorded in 1259, and Thomas de Dalzell fought at Bannockburn. The Dalzell lands were forfeited later in the 14th century, but regained through marriage in the 15th. Sir Robert Dalzell was created Lord Dalzell in 1628, and his son was further elevated in the peerage as Earl of Carnwath, in 1639. In 1645 the Dalzell estates were sold to the Hamiltons of Orbiston, who held them until the 20th century. Scottish emigration has dispersed the Dalziel family across the English-speaking world.

The Dalziel coat of arms is sable, a man's body proper, i.e. the flesh-coloured silhouette of a man against a black background. The origin of this peculiar arms was written about by Sir Robert Douglas, 6th Baronet, in 1764:

The account of their origin, given by Mr. Nisbet, and other historians, is, that in the reign of king Kenneth II, a kinsman, and favourite of that king, being taken prisoner by the Picts, was put to death, and hung up upon a gallows in view of the Scots camp. King Kenneth being highly provoked and incensed at the affront, offered a considerable reward to any of his subjects who would take down, and carry off the corpse; but, for some time, none would venture to undertake the dangerous enterprise. At last, a gentleman of more spirit and courage than the rest, said "dal zell", which, in the old Scots language, signifies, 'I dare'. He effectually performed it to the king's satisfaction, who accordingly rewarded him nobly. His posterity assumed the word DALZELL for their surname, and that remarkable bearing of a man hanging on a gallows for their arms, with I dare for their motto, in memory of the above brave action, though they now bear only a naked man proper.

== People ==
People with this surname include:

=== Dalyell ===
- Dalyell baronets
- Sir John Graham Dalyell (1775–1851), Scottish antiquary and naturalist
- Tam Dalyell of the Binns (1615–1685), Scottish general
- Tam Dalyell (1932–2017), British Labour politician
- Elsie Dalyell (1881–1948), Australian pathologist

=== Dalzell ===
- John Dalzell (1845–1927), American politician
- Rick Dalzell (born 1957), American businessman
- Sammy Dalzell (1933–1977), Northern Ireland weightlifter
- Stewart Dalzell (1943–2019), American judge

=== Dalziel ===
- Bobby Dalziel, Scottish footballer
- Brothers Dalziel, a firm of Victorian engravers founded in 1839 by George and Edward Dalziel, assisted by John and Thomas Dalziel (see below)
- Charles Dalziel (1904–1986), American professor of engineering
- Dale Dalziel, American curler
- Davison Dalziel, 1st Baron Dalziel of Wooler (1852–1928), Scottish businessman and politician
- Diana Vreeland (nee Dalziel, 1903–1989), fashion magazine editor
- Gordon Dalziel (born 1962), Scottish football player and manager
- Henry Dalziel (1893–1965), Australian war hero
- Henry Dalziel, 1st Baron Dalziel of Kirkcaldy (1868–1935), Scottish politician
- Ian Dalziel (disambiguation)
- John Dalziel, Scottish rugby nion coach
- John McEwan Dalziel (1872–1948), British doctor and botanist
- Kathleen Dalziel (1881–1969), Australian poet
- Keith Dalziel (1921–1994), biochemist
- Lianne Dalziel (born 1960), New Zealand politician from Christchurch
- Margaret Dalziel, New Zealand academic
- Raewyn Dalziel, New Zealand historian
- Ryan Dalziel (born 1982), British racing driver
- Stuart Dalziel (born 1963), British and New Zealand fluid dynamicist
- Thomas Dalziel (1823–1906), engraver

=== Fictional people ===
- Andrew Dalziel, fictitious detective in literature and television, part of the team Dalziel and Pascoe created by Reginald Hill.
- Royce Varisey, tenth Duke of Wolverstone went by the codename 'Dalziel' (his mother's family name) throughout the Napoleonic Wars in the Bastion Club series of romance novels by Stephanie Laurens.

=== People with the given name ===
- Dalziel Hammick (1887–1966), British chemist

== Other uses ==
Motherwell still contains Dalziel Parish, a congregation of the Church of Scotland, as well as the Dalzell Steelworks, now owned by Liberty House. The estate of Dalziel House, the former home of the Baron Hamilton of Dalzell, is now a country park on the south side of the town. Dalziel Rugby Club play at Dalziel Park in nearby Carfin. The name is also used by several Motherwell-based institutions, including Dalziel High School and the former Dalziel Co-operative Society. Dalziel Park Stadium was a nineteenth-century football stadium that was the home of the town's football team Motherwell F.C.

== See also ==
- Dalzell (disambiguation)
