= Dalzell =

Dalzell can refer to:

== Places ==
- Dalzell, Illinois
- Dalzell, Ohio
- Dalzell, South Carolina
- Dalzell, South Dakota
- Dalzell House, Motherwell, Scotland

== People ==
- Alana Dalzell (born 2001), Northern Irish cricketer
- Allen Dalzell (1821–1869), Scottish chemist and pharmacologist
- Andrea Dalzell, American nurse
- Andrew Dalzell (1742–1806), Scottish scholar
- Chris Walrus Dalzell, Australian artist
- Hamish Dalzell (born 1996), New Zealand rugby union player
- John Dalzell (1845–1927), U.S. Representative
- Jon Dalzell (born 1960), American-Israeli basketball player
- Kevin Dalzell (born 1974), American rugby union player
- Nelson Dalzell (1921–1989), New Zealand rugby union player
- Nicol Alexander Dalzell (1817–1877), Scottish botanist whose standard author abbreviation is Dalzell
- Rick Dalzell (born 1957), American businessman
- Robert Dalzell, various people
- Sammy Dalzell (1933–1977), Irish weightlifter
- Stewart Dalzell (1943–2019), American judge
- Trent Dalzell (born 1989), Australian actor
- William Ronald Dalzell (1910–2004), British art teacher, illustrator, author and radio broadcaster
- Earls of Carnwath, surnamed Dalzell

== See also ==
- Dalziel
