= Robert Dalzell =

Robert Dalzell may refer to:

- Robert Dalzell, 1st Lord Dalzell (c. 1550–1636), Scottish nobleman
- Robert Dalzell, 1st Earl of Carnwath (1611–1654), Scottish nobleman and Royalist supporter
- Robert Dalzell (British Army officer, born 1662) (1662–1758), British Army general
- Robert Dalzell, 5th Earl of Carnwath (1687–1737), Scottish nobleman and Jacobite supporter
- Robert Dalzell, 6th Earl of Carnwath (1768–1839), Scottish nobleman and soldier
- Robert Dalzell (British Army officer, born 1816) (1816–1878), British Army officer
- Robert Dalzell, 11th Earl of Carnwath (1847–1910)
- Sir Robert Dalzell, 1st Baronet (1639–1686), Scottish politician

== See also ==
- Robert Dalziel (disambiguation)
- Robert Dalyell (disambiguation)
