= Robert Dalyell =

Robert Dalyell may refer to:

- Sir Robert Dalyell, 8th Baronet (1821–1886), British diplomat
- Sir Robert Anstruther Dalyell (1831–1890), British administrator in India

== See also ==
- Robert Dalzell (disambiguation)
- Robert Dalziel (disambiguation)
