= Ronald Dalzell =

Ronald Dalzell may refer to:

- William Ronald Dalzell (1910–2004), art teacher, book illustrator, and radio broadcaster
- Ronald Dalzell, 12th Earl of Carnwath (1883–1931)
