= John Dalzell, 4th Earl of Carnwath =

Scottish nobleman and soldier (1649-1702)

Lieutenant Colonel John Dalzell, 4th Earl of Carnwath (1649–1702) was a Scottish nobleman and soldier. He was the son of Gavin Dalzell, 2nd Earl of Carnwath and Margaret Carnegie.

== Early life ==
He succeeded to his brother's titles of Earl of Carnwath and Lord Dalzell in June 1683. The titles have a special remainder to heirs male whatsoever bearing the Name and Arms of Dalzell, which means that they can pass to the senior heir outside of the line descending from the first holder the title, should that line become extinct. The heir is merely required to have the surname and Arms of Dalzell. There is not the requirement that the heir be of the body of the original holder.

On Lord Carnwath's death on 7 June 1702, the line of the first Earl became extinct. The titles were therefore able to pass by virtue of the special remainder through collateral succession to Lord Carnwath's second cousin once removed, Sir Robert Dalzell, 3rd Baronet, the senior heir of the first Lord Dalzell. But for this remainder, only the Lordship would have been inherited and the Earldom would have become extinct.

Peerage of Scotland
Preceded by James Dalzell	Earl of Carnwath; 1683–1702	Succeeded by Robert Dalzell
