= Arthur Dalzell =

Arthur Dalzell may refer to:

- Arthur Dalzell, 13th Earl of Carnwath (1851–1941), British Army officer
- Arthur Alexander Dalzell, 9th Earl of Carnwath (1799–1875), Scottish nobleman and soldier
