= John Dalzell (disambiguation) =

John Dalzell (1845–1927) was a U.S. representative from Pennsylvania.

John Dalzell may also refer to:

- Sir John Dalzell, 2nd Baronet (died 1689), Scottish politician
- John Dalzell, 4th Earl of Carnwath (1649–1702), Scottish nobleman and soldier

== See also ==
- John Dalzell Kenworthy (1859–1954), English painter
- John Dalzell Rankine (1907–1987), British colonial administrator
- William John Dalzell Burnyeat (1874–1916), British Liberal Party politician
