= Arthur Dalzell, 13th Earl of Carnwath =

British Army general

Brigadier-General The Right Honourable The Earl of Carnwath CB
- Born: 25 December 1851
- Died: 9 March 1941 (aged 89)
- Military career
- Allegiance: United Kingdom
- Branch: British Army
- Service years: 1870–1917
- Rank: Brigadier-General
- Commands: 207th (2nd East Midland) Brigade; 1st Battalion, Oxfordshire Light Infantry
- Conflicts: Second Boer War; First World War
- Awards: Companion of the Order of the Bath

Brigadier-General Arthur Edward Dalzell, 13th Earl of Carnwath, CB (25 December 1851 – 9 March 1941) was a British Army officer and a Scottish representative peer.

== Family ==
Dalzell was born into an old Scottish family. He was the fourth of five children born to Colonel the Honourable Robert Alexander George Dalzell (1816–1878) and Sarah Bushby Harris (1821–1916). His father was the fourth son of Robert Alexander Dalzell, 6th Earl of Carnwath, and his mother the daughter of John and Amelia Harris of Eldon House, London, Ontario, Canada. His elder brother Robert succeeded an uncle as Earl of Carnwath in 1887, when Arthur and his sisters were raised to the rank of children of an Earl by Royal Warrant of Precedence.

Dalzell married Muriel Wyndham Knatchbull, daughter of Colonel Norton Knatchbull, at St Peter's Church, Eaton Square, on 4 December 1902. They had two children:

- Muriel Marjorie Dalzell (22 September 1903 – 18 February 1995), married in 1927 Major John Norton Taylor.
- Arthur Robert Dalzell (11 March 1907 – 28 February 1909).

== Military career ==
Receiving his education at East Sheen and Cheltenham, Dalzell joined the 12th Suffolk Regiment as an ensign in 1870. The following year he transferred to the 52nd (Oxfordshire) Regiment of Foot and was commissioned a lieutenant on 1 November 1871. He had become a supernumerary captain by March 1882, and made full captain on 7 October 1885. While he served with his regiment in Malta he first saw active service in Upper Burma between 1891 and 1892. By now a major, he was appointed as Inspector of Gymnasia in Bengal and Punjab before he returned to his regular duties in 1896. Further promotions followed, including as commanding officer (CO) of a battalion of the Oxfordshire and Buckinghamshire Light Infantry as a lieutenant colonel on 23 October 1899, and he served in the Second Boer War, seeing action at Paardeberg and other campaigns during the conflict. He was appointed a Companion of the Order of the Bath on 29 November 1900 for his services there.

Dalzell's sister Lady Maud Rolleston writes about their time in South Africa during the Second Boer War in her book Yeoman service: being the diary of the wife of an imperial yeomanry officer during the Boer War. Amongst various adventures of her own, she set up a convalescent home for soldiers in Kimberley and helped nurse her badly injured husband, Colonel Lancelot Rolleston, back to health.

After his return from South Africa, Dalzell relinquished command of the battalion on 23 October 1903 and was placed on half-pay and promoted to brevet colonel.

Ultimately promoted to the honorary rank of brigadier-general, Dalzell served on the Western Front during the First World War.

== Peer ==
Upon the death of his nephew, Ronald Arthur Dalzell, 12th Earl of Carnwath, in 1931 Dalzell succeeded to the peerage as Earl of Carnwath and was subsequently elected a Scottish representative peer in 1935. He died on 9 March 1941 at his country residence, Sand House, Wedmore, Somerset, England. Lady Carnwarth died in 1958.

Peerage of Scotland
| Preceded by Ronald Dalzell | Earl of Carnwath; 1931–1941 | Dormant |
