= Robert Dalzell (British Army officer, born 1816) =

Colonel Robert Alexander George Dalzell, CB (19 August 1816 – 19 October 1878) was a British aristocrat and soldier.

Dalzell was the youngest son of Lieutenant-General Robert Dalzell, 6th Earl of Carnwath, and Andulusia Browne. He had three older brothers who each survived their father to be successively Earls of Carnwath.

On 27 August 1846, he married Sarah Bushby Harris, daughter of Captain John Harris, RN, of Eldon House, Ontario, Canada. Together they had the following children:

- Amelia Andalusia Dalzell (died 15 August 1850), died in childhood
- Robert Harris Carnwath Dalzell, 11th Earl of Carnwath (1 July 1847 – 8 March 1910)
- Lady Mary Isabella Dalzell (1850 – 5 February 1936)
- Arthur Edward Dalzell, 13th Earl of Carnwath (25 December 1851 – 9 March 1941)
- Lady Charlotte Emma Maud Dalzell CBE (2 September 1859 – 13 November 1949), married 25 February 1882, Colonel Sir Lancelot Rolleston of Watnall Hall.

He was also appointed Knight of the Order of the Medjidie.

Dalzell died on 19 October 1878 aged 62. If he had survived his elder brother, Harry Dalzell, 10th Earl of Carnwath, he would have himself succeeded as Earl of Carnwath, the title instead passing to his eldest son, Robert Dalzell. To recognise this, his other children were raised to the rank of children of an Earl by Royal Warrant of Precedence in 1889.
