= James Dalzell, 3rd Earl of Carnwath =

Scottish nobleman (1648-1683)

James Dalzell, 3rd Earl of Carnwath (1648–1683) was a Scottish nobleman. He was the son of Gavin Dalzell, 2nd Earl of Carnwath and Margaret Carnegie.

He was educated in 1659 at the University of Glasgow. He succeeded to his father's title of Earl of Carnwath in June 1674. He married Lady Mary Seton, daughter of George Seton, 3rd Earl of Winton and the Honourable Elizabeth Maxwell, on 10 December 1676. In January 1682 he sold the estate of Carnwath to Sir George Lockhart.

He died in 1683, without male issue, and his titles were inherited by his younger brother, John Dalzell.

Peerage of Scotland
Preceded by Gavin Dalzell	Earl of Carnwath; 1674–1683	Succeeded by John Dalzell
