= Henry Dalzell, 8th Earl of Carnwath =

Henry Arthur Hew Dalzell, 8th Earl of Carnwath was born 12 April 1858 in what is now southern Germany, the only child of Thomas Henry Dalzell, 7th Earl of Carnwath and Isabella Eliza Wilmot. He succeeded to his father's titles upon the latter's death in 1867. In January 1873, it was reported that fourteen years of age Lord Carnwath was the youngest Earl in Britain. He died 13 March 1873 of measles at Harrow where he was a student. He was succeeded in his titles by his father's younger brother General Arthur Dalzell.

Peerage of Scotland
Preceded by Thomas Henry Dalzell	Earl of Carnwath; 1867–1873	Succeeded by Arthur Alexander Dalzell
