= Robert Dalziel =

Robert Dalziel may refer to:

- Bobby Dalziel (active 1948–1956), Scottish footballer
- Robert Dalzell (died 1758), known to be commonly misspelled as Dalziel

== See also ==
- Robert Dalzell (disambiguation), others similarly named
