= Dumfriesshire (Parliament of Scotland constituency) =

Old parliamentary constituency

Before the Act of Union 1707, the barons of the sheriffdom or shire of Dumfries (also called Nithsdale) and the stewartry of Annandale elected commissioners to represent them in the unicameral Parliament of Scotland and in the Convention of Estates. The number of commissioners was increased from two to four in 1690.

After 1708, Dumfriesshire returned one member to the House of Commons of Great Britain and later to the House of Commons of the United Kingdom.

== List of shire commissioners ==
- 1628–33, 1639–41, 1643, 1644–47, 1648: Sir Robert Grierson of Lag
- 1643: John Laurie of Maxwelton

During the Commonwealth of England, Scotland and Ireland, the sheriffdom of Dumfries was represented by one Member of Parliament in the Protectorate Parliament at Westminster.

- 1654–55: James Johnstone, 2nd Earl of Hartfell
- 1656–58: George Smith

After the Restoration, the Parliament of Scotland was again summoned to meet in Edinburgh.

- 1661–63: James Crichton of St Leonards
- 1661–63, 1665 (convention), 1667 (convention), 1669–72, 1678 (convention): Robert Fergusson of Craigdarroch
- 1665 (convention), 1667 (convention), 1669–74, 1678 (convention), 1681–82, 1685: Sir Robert Dalzell of Glenae (died 1685)
- 1678 (convention), 1681–82, 1685–86: Sir Robert Grierson of Lagg
- 1686, 1689 (convention): Sir John Dalzell of Glenae (died 1689)
- 1690: James Johnstone of Corhead (died c.1690)
- 1690–1701: William Creichtone of Craufurdstone (died c.1701)
- 1689 (convention), 1689–99: Sir James Johnstone of Westerhall (died c.1700)
- 1690–1702: Sir Thomas Kirkpatrick of Closeburn
- 1693–1701: Alexander Johnstone of Elsiesheills
- 1700–02, 1702–07: Sir John Johnstone of Westerhall
- 1702–07: William Douglass of Dornock
- 1702, 1702–07: John Sharp of Hoddam
- 1702–07: Alexander Fergussone of Isle

== See also ==
- List of constituencies in the Parliament of Scotland at the time of the Union
