= Earl of Carnwath =

Title in the Peerage of Scotland

Earldom of Carnwath
- Creation date: 21 April 1639
- Created by: Charles I
- Peerage: Peerage of Scotland
- First holder: Robert Dalzell, 2nd Lord Dalzell
- Remainder to: Heirs male whatsoever bearing the name and Arms of Dalzell
- Subsidiary titles: Lord Dalzell (1628); Lord Dalzell and Liberton (1639); Baronet, of Glenae (1666)
- Status: Dormant

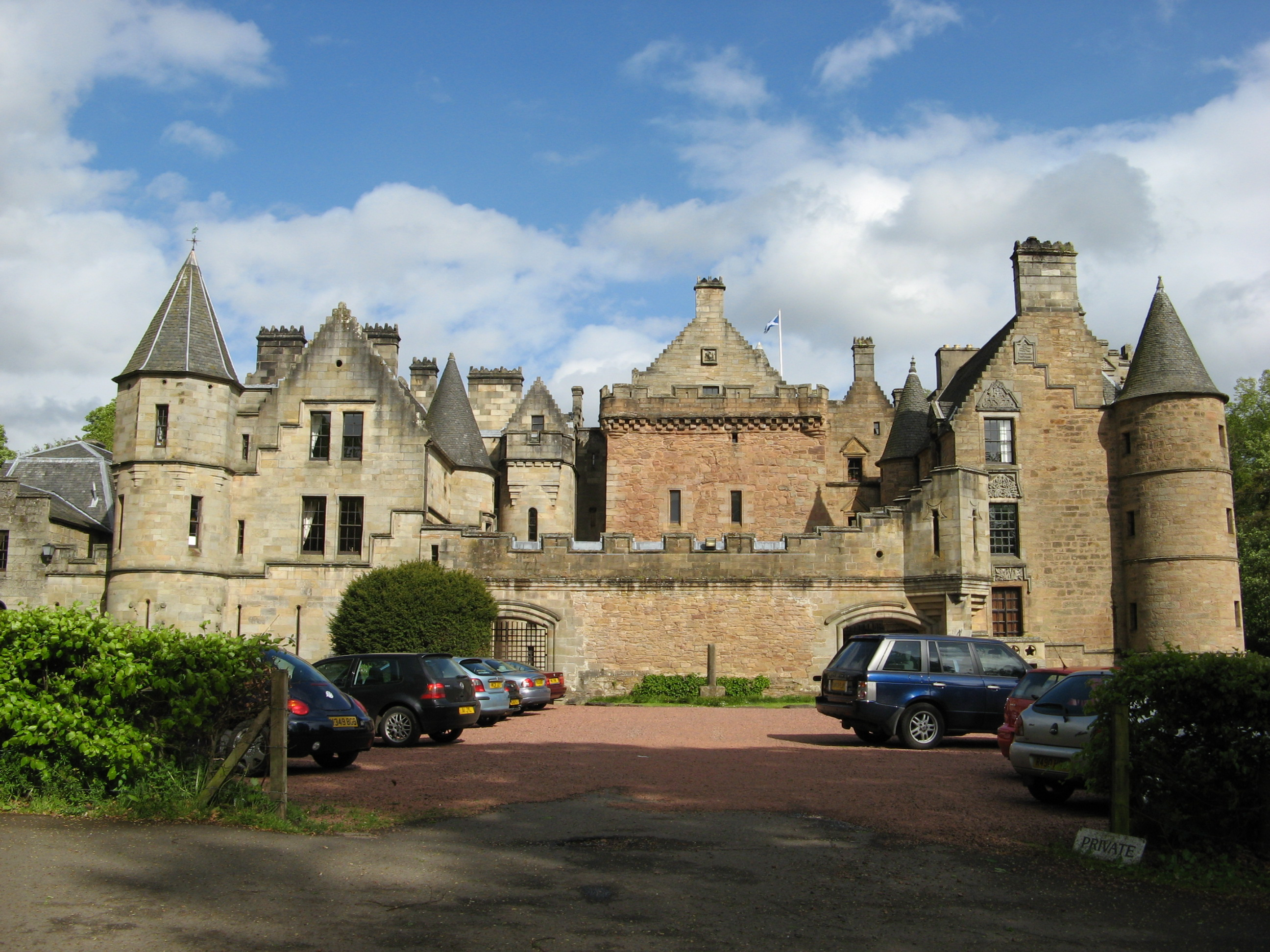
Dalzell House, North Lanarkshire, the original seat of the Earls of Carnwath

The title Earl of Carnwath is a title in the Peerage of Scotland, created together with the subsidiary title of Lord Dalzell and Liberton, on 21 April 1639 for Robert Dalzell, 2nd Lord Dalzell. His father, Sir Robert Dalzell, had been raised to the Peerage as a Lord of Parliament when he was created Lord Dalzell on 18 September 1628, also in the Peerage of Scotland. The titles refer to Carnwath in Lanarkshire, and Liberton in Edinburgh. The surname of Dalzell is pronounced /diːˈɛl/ dee-EL.

== Earldom of Carnwath ==
The titles have a remainder to heirs male whatsoever bearing the name and arms of Dalzell. This means that they can pass to the senior male heir, whoever that is, outside of the line descending from the first holder of the title, should that line become extinct; there is not the usual requirement that the heir be of the body of the original holder. The senior heir male is merely required to be of the bloodline and have the surname and arms of Dalzell.

On the death of the fourth Earl in 1702, the line of the first Earl became extinct, and according to the special remainder the Earldom passed by collateral succession to Sir Robert Dalzell, 3rd Baronet, the senior heir of the first Lord and a collateral heir of the first Earl being the great-grandson of the first Earl's brother. But for this special remainder, he would have inherited only the Lordship, and the Earldom would have then become extinct.

== Family history ==
The original seat of the Earls of Carnwath was at Dalzell House, Motherwell, North Lanarkshire. This formed part of the larger Carnwath Estate including the barony of Dalzell, which had been held by the family since the fourteenth century. This was to be sold by the third and fourth Earls to help pay the fines of their father and grandfather for their part in supporting the Royalist side during the English Civil War. It was to be bought by Sir George Lockart, and the Hamilton family, later Barons Hamilton of Dalzell.

In 1643 the first Earl was accused by the Convention of the Scottish Estate of betraying them to the King during the Civil War. He was fined £10,000 and his titles were forfeited and he was sentenced to death by an act of the Scottish Parliament on 25 February 1645. This act also provided "that his lawful son Gavin, Lord Dalzell, shall enjoy not only all the estates but the title of Earl as if his father were dead". His death sentence was not to be carried out, nor was the forfeiture of the titles recognised in Royalist circles.

The first Earl went on to fight with King Charles I at the battle of Naseby on 14 June 1645, where the Earl received some blame for the loss of the battle. King Charles, attempting to rally his men, rode forward but as he did so, the Earl seized his bridle and pulled him back, fearing for the King's safety. Lord Carnwath's action was misinterpreted by the royalist soldiers as a signal to move back, leading to a collapse of their position. The military balance then tipped decisively in favour of Parliament.

The first Earl's nephew, Robert Dalzell, Member of Parliament for Dumfries, was created a baronet, of Glenae, Dumfries, on 11 April 1666, in the Baronetage of Nova Scotia. He was the son of the Honourable Sir John Dalzell, himself the younger son of the first Lord. The baronetcy was to pass from father to son, until the third Baronet succeeded as the fifth Earl of Carnwath in 1702 by virtue of the Earldom's special remainder, with the peerage titles then merging with the baronetcy.

The fifth Earl was a Jacobite sympathiser and supported the Earl of Mar in favour of James Stuart, the Old Pretender, in an unsuccessful rebellion in 1715 known as the Fifteen, or Lord Mar's Revolt. For his role in the rebellion the Hanoverian government passed a Writ of Attainder for treason against Lord Carnwath in 1716. He was sentenced to death, with his titles and what then remained of the estates being forfeited. The death sentence was later to be remitted by virtue of the Indemnity Act 1717.

The attainder was reversed by an act of Parliament, the Robert Dalzell Restoration Act 1826 (7 Geo. 4. c. 52), on 26 May 1826 in favour of his grandson, Lieutenant-General Robert Alexander Dalzell and the titles were restored to him.

Several of the Earls are noteworthy in their own right. The eighth Earl was reported as being the youngest Earl in Britain in 1873 at the age of fourteen. Both the eleventh and thirteenth Earls were Scottish representative peer in the House of Lords.

== Arms ==
The Earl's coat of arms is sable, a man's body proper, i.e. the flesh-coloured silhouette of a man against a black background. The origin of this peculiar arms was written about by Sir Robert Douglas, 6th Baronet, in 1764:

The account of their origin, given by Mr. Nisbet, and other historians, is, that in the reign of king Kenneth II. a kinsman, and favourite of that king, being taken prisoner by the Picts, was put to death, and hung up upon a gallows in view of the Scotch camp. King Kenneth being highly provoked and incensed at the affront, offered a considerable reward to any of his subjects who would take down, and carry off the corpse; but, for some time, none would venture to undertake the dangerous enterprise. At last, a gentleman of more spirit and courage than the rest, said "dal zell", which, in the old Scotch language, signifies, 'I dare'. He effectually performed it to the king's satisfaction, who accordingly rewarded him nobly. His posterity assumed the word DALZELL for their surname, and that remarkable bearing of a man hanging on a gallows for their arms, with I dare for their motto, in memory of the above brave action, though they now bear only a naked man proper.

== Lords Dalzell (1628) ==
- Robert Dalzell, 1st Lord Dalzell (died 1635 or 1636)
- Robert Dalzell, 2nd Lord Dalzell (1611−1654) (created Earl of Carnwath and Lord Dalzell and Liberton in 1639)

== Earls of Carnwath (1639) ==
Courtesy title for the heir apparent to the Earldom: Lord Dalzell or Lord Liberton, with the substantive title of Master of Carnwath

- Robert Dalzell, 1st Earl of Carnwath (1611−1654), eldest son of the first Lord
- Gavin Dalzell, 2nd Earl of Carnwath (1627−1674), eldest son of the first Earl
- James Dalzell, 3rd Earl of Carnwath (1648−1683), eldest son of the second Earl
- John Dalzell, 4th Earl of Carnwath (1649−1702), youngest son of the second Earl
- Robert Dalzell, 5th Earl of Carnwath (1687–1737), great-great-grandson of the first Lord, had succeeded as third Baronet in 1689, (titles forfeited by attainder 1716)

But for the attainder, the descent would have included the following three individuals:
- Alexander Dalzell (1721–1787), eldest son of the fifth Earl
- Robert Dalzell (1755–1808), eldest son of the above Alexander Dalzell
- John Dalzell (1795–1814), eldest son of the above Robert Dalzell
Titles restored by Act of Parliament 26 May 1826

- Robert Alexander Dalzell, 6th Earl of Carnwath (1768–1839), son of Robert Dalzell (1738–1788), youngest son of the fifth Earl
- Thomas Henry Dalzell, 7th Earl of Carnwath (1797–1867), eldest son of the sixth Earl
- Henry Arthur Hew Dalzell, 8th Earl of Carnwath (1858–1873), eldest son of the seventh Earl
- Arthur Alexander Dalzell, 9th Earl of Carnwath (1799–1875), younger son of the sixth Earl
- Harry Burrard Dalzell, 10th Earl of Carnwath (1804–1887), younger son of the sixth Earl
- Robert Harris Carnwath Dalzell, 11th Earl of Carnwath (1847–1910), eldest son of Colonel the Honourable Robert Dalzell (1816–1878), youngest son of the sixth Earl
- Ronald Arthur Dalzell, 12th Earl of Carnwath (1883–1931), eldest son of the eleventh Earl
- Arthur Edward Dalzell, 13th Earl of Carnwath (1851–1941), younger son of the above Colonel the Honourable Robert Dalzell (1816–1878), youngest son of the sixth Earl

== Dalzell baronets, of Glenae (1666) ==
Arms of Dalzell of Glenae, matriculated with the Court of the Lord Lyon around 1672–77: Sable a naked man, his arms expanded proper, with a bordure argent

- Sir Robert Dalzell, 1st Baronet (1639−1686), grandson of the first Lord Dalzell, through his father, the Honourable Sir John Dalzell (died 1669)
- Sir John Dalzell, 2nd Baronet (died 1689), eldest son of the first Baronet
- Sir Robert Dalzell, 3rd Baronet (1687–1737), eldest son of the second Baronet, succeeded as fifth Earl of Carnwath in 1702

See above for subsequent holders of the baronetcy

== Note ==
- In some publications, the numbering of the Earls is greater, as they have taken into account the above three people who were in succession but were unable to legally hold the title during the time it was under attainder, and in some earlier publications the first Lord is also incorrectly numbered as the first Earl. The above numbering for each Earl is consistent with the modern numbering used in the printing of the Official Roll of the Baronetage in The London Gazette in 1915.

== See also ==
- Dalziel
- Dalyell baronets

== Bibliography ==
- Cust, Richard (2005), Charles I: A Political Life, Harlow: Pearson Education, ISBN 0-582-07034-1
- Gregg, Pauline (1981), King Charles I, London: Dent, ISBN 0-460-04437-0
- Holmes, Clive (2006), Why was Charles I Executed?, London & New York: Hambledon Continuum, ISBN 1-85285-282-8
- Hesilrige, Arthur G. M. (1921). Debrett's Peerage and Titles of courtesy. London: London: Dean & son, limited. p. 178.
