= Chris Walrus Dalzell =

Australian artist from Canberra

- Spiraleyes art
- Born: Christopher Dalzell; Canberra, ACT, Australia
- Other names: Walrus
- Occupations: Artist, MRV Driver
- Known for: Visual Arts

Chris Walrus Dalzell (born 1986 or 1987) is an Australian artist from Canberra who is most known for a style he calls Spiraleyes, as well as his contributions to Art, Not Apart, his Spider Web street art, which he paints in public places on a clear wall of pallet wrap stretched between street poles, and various other art projects. He is a Senior Technical Officer at the Australian National University.
