= Thomas Dalzell, 7th Earl of Carnwath =

Thomas Henry Dalzell, 7th Earl of Carnwath (2 September 1797 – 14 December 1867) was a Scottish nobleman. He was the son of Robert Alexander Dalzell, 6th Earl of Carnwath and Andulusia Browne.

He married firstly, on 9 September 1834, Mary Anne Grattan, daughter of the Right Honourable Henry Grattan. He married secondly, on 2 May 1855, Isabella Eliza Wilmot, daughter of Colonel Eardley Wilmot and widow of John Hartpole Lecky. They had one son together.

Lord Carnwath died on 14 December 1867, aged 70 at Bagnères de Bigorre, France, and his titles were inherited by his son, Henry Dalzell, then 10 years of age, who died only six years later in 1873. Lady Carnwath outlived her husband and son, and died in her 83rd year at Cromwell-place in London on 16 October 1902.

Peerage of Scotland
| Preceded by Robert Dalzell | Earl of Carnwath; 1839–1867 | Succeeded by Henry Arthur Hew Dalzell |
