= Sir Robert Dalzell, 1st Baronet =

Scottish politician

Sir Robert Dalzell, 1st Baronet (1639−1686), was a Scottish politician.

== Early life ==
Sir Robert was born in 1639 to the Honourable Sir John Dalzell and Agnes Nisbet. His paternal grandfather was Robert Dalzell, 1st Lord Dalzell.

== Career ==
Sir Robert held the office of Member of Parliament for the sheriffdom of Dumfries between 1665 and 1674, and again from 1681 to 1682. He held the office for the final time in 1685.

He was created a Baronet of Glenae, Dumfries on 11 April 1666, in the Baronetage of Nova Scotia.

== Personal life ==
He first married Catherine Sandilands, daughter of Sir James Sandilands and Lady Agnes Carnegie, with whom he had one daughter. He married Lady Margaret Johnstone, daughter of James Johnstone, 1st Earl of Hartfell and Margaret Douglas, on 11 October 1654. He then married Violet Riddell, with whom he had three sons.

He died in April 1686, and was succeeded in his baronetcy by his eldest son, Sir John Dalzell, 2nd Baronet. His grandson, Robert Dalzell, was eventually to succeed as the Earl of Carnwath.

== See also ==
- Earl of Carnwath

Baronetage of Nova Scotia
New creation	Baronet (of Glenae); 1666–1686	Succeeded by John Dalzell
