= Ian Dalziel =

Ian Dalziel may refer to:

- Ian Dalziel (politician) (born 1947), Scottish politician and former member of the European Parliament
- Ian Dalziel (footballer) (born 1962), English former footballer for Hereford United and Carlisle United
- Ian Dalziel (geologist) (born 1937), Scottish geologist

== See also ==
- Dalziel, a Scottish surname
