= Robert Dalzell, 11th Earl of Carnwath =

British Army officer and noble

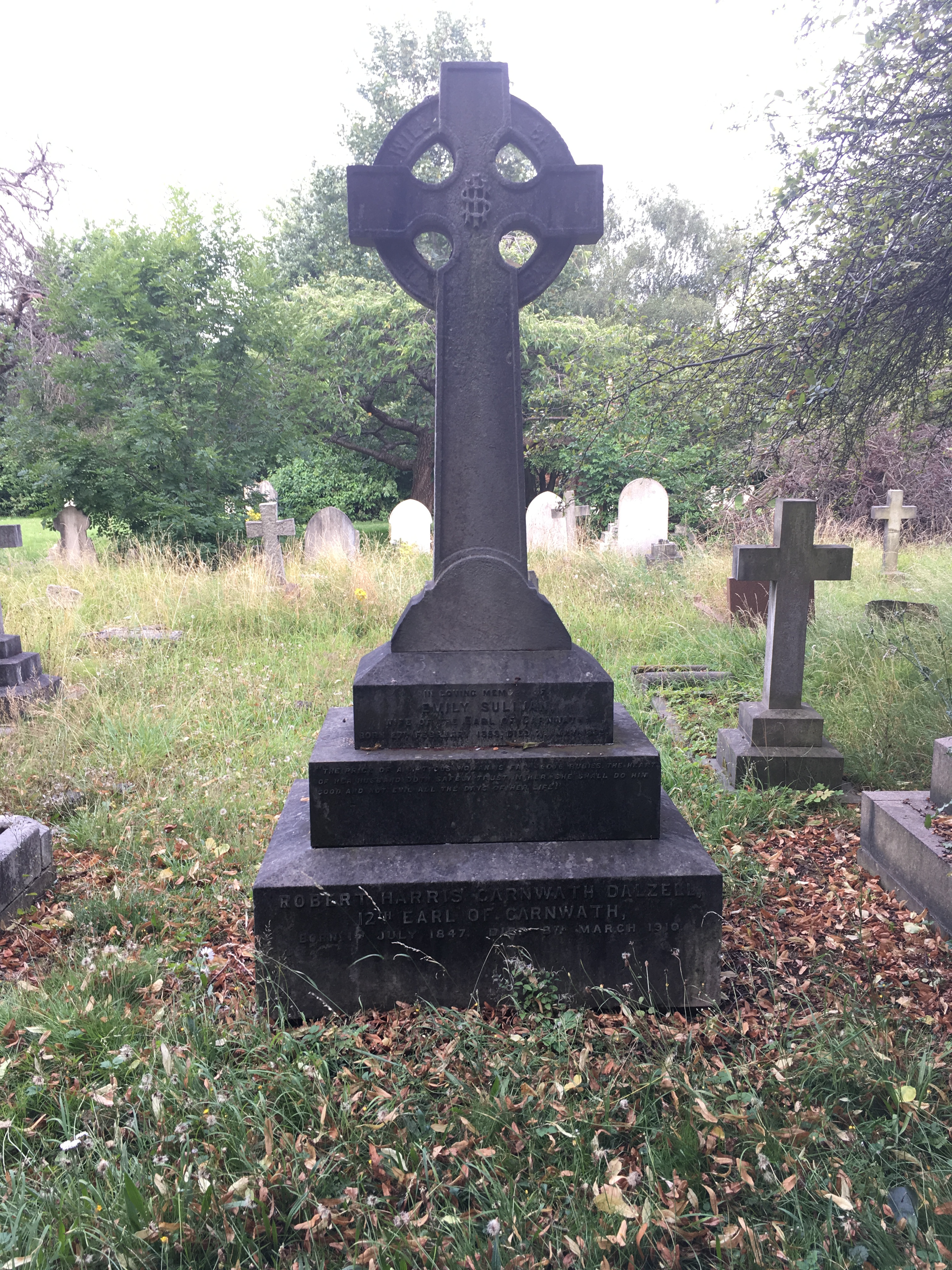
The grave of Lieutenant-Colonel Robert Harris Carnwath Dalzell, 11th Earl of Carnwath, at Fulham Cemetery.

Lieutenant-Colonel Robert Harris Carnwath Dalzell, 11th Earl of Carnwath (1 July 1847 – 8 March 1910) was a Scottish hereditary peer and soldier.

He was the eldest of five children born to Colonel the Honourable Robert Alexander George Dalzell (1816–1878) and Sarah Bushby Harris (1821–1916).

His mother was the daughter of John Harris RN (1782–1850), of Eldon House, Treasurer of the London District of Upper Canada, and Amelia Ryerse, UE (1798–1882).

His paternal grandfather was Robert Alexander Dalzell, 6th Earl of Carnwath, who had been restored to the Earldom of Carnwath and associated titles by an Act of Parliament in 1826. Three of Lieutenant-Colonel Dalzell's uncles had succeeded to the titles before he inherited them in 1887.

On 19 August 1873 he married Emily Sulivan Hippisley (1853–1889) and they had four children:

- Lady Ida Elizabeth Dalzell (9 June 1876 – bef. 1934), married, in 1907, Frederick Ramon de Bertodano, Marques del Moral
- Robert Hippisley Dalzell, Lord Dalzell (30 September 1877 – 2 August 1904)
- Lady Violet Charlotte Dalzell (18 March 1879 – 1 October 1956), married, in 1901, Lt.-Col. Hon. Harold Greenwood Henderson
- Ronald Arthur Dalzell, 12th Earl of Carnwath (1883–1931)

Dalzell served with the Queen's Own Cameron Highlanders, rising to the rank of lieutenant-colonel. A Scottish representative peer, he died while walking from his home, Carnwath House, Fulham, to the House of Lords. The grave of the 11th Earl is marked "12th Earl of Carnwath", which was actually the title of his successor, his second (but only surviving) son Ronald. This increment to the 11th Earl's number stems from Robert Dalzell, 1st Lord Dalzell often (though incorrectly) being included as the 1st Earl.

Dalzell visited Sweden on two occasions, in 1895 and 1908, and there became acquainted with Swedish author, painter and cartoonist Albert Engström (1869–1940). Engström wrote about their meetings in the short essay "Ett minne från England" (Swe., "A memory from England"), which was published in his book En bok till (Swe., Another Book, 1909).

Peerage of Scotland
Preceded by Harry Burrard Dalzell	Earl of Carnwath; 1887–1910	Succeeded by Ronald Arthur Dalzell
