= Stuart Dalziel =

British and New Zealand fluid dynamicist

- Born: Stuart Bruce Dalziel; Dunedin, New Zealand
- Education: University of Auckland; University of Cambridge (PhD)
- Scientific career
- Fields: Fluid dynamics
- Workplaces: University of Cambridge
- Thesis: Two-Layer Hydraulics: Maximal Exchange Flows (1988)
- Doctoral advisor: Paul Linden
- Website: http://www.damtp.cam.ac.uk/user/sd103

Stuart Bruce Dalziel is a British and New Zealand fluid dynamicist. He is currently based at the Department of Applied Mathematics and Theoretical Physics at the University of Cambridge, where he has directed the GKB Laboratory since 1997. He was promoted to the rank of Professor in 2016.

Dalziel completed his PhD in Cambridge in 1988, under the supervision of Paul Linden.

Dalziel's research areas include stratified turbulence and internal gravity waves.
