= Art, Not Apart =

Annual arts festival in Canberra, Australia

Coordinates: 35.287568°S 149.127326°E

- Genre: Contemporary Arts Festival
- Frequency: Annually
- Location: Canberra
- Inaugurated: 2011
- Website: http://artnotapart.com/

Art, Not Apart is an annual Australian contemporary arts festival held in Canberra, providing an opportunity for artists to display their works and connect with the community.

The Art, Not Apart festival features exhibitions, performance art, numerous music stages, installations, strange interventions, street food, cafes and a dance party. The festival producer, David Caffery, told media that in producing Art Not Apart, he is consciously trying not to copy other events. Art, Not Apart is traditionally held on the Saturday after Canberra Day in mid-March.

The first Art, Not Apart was held in NewActon in 2011. Since the construction of the temporary pop-up Westside shipping container precinct in 2015, the festival grew to include Westside Acton Park in 2015 and 2016. The festival has since included venues adjacent to its central location of NewActon, including The Shine Dome (Australian Academy of Science), National Film and Sound Archive (NFSA), ANU, Albert Hall, and other Canberra venues.

Art, Not Apart has grown to attract over 15,000 attendees each year.
