= Arthur Alexander Dalzell, 9th Earl of Carnwath =

British Army general

General The Right Honourable The Earl of Carnwath
- Born: 15 September 1799
- Died: 28 April 1875 (aged 75)
- Military career
- Allegiance: United Kingdom
- Branch: British Army
- Rank: General
- Commands: South-Eastern District

General Arthur Alexander Dalzell, 9th Earl of Carnwath (15 September 1799 – 28 April 1875) was a Scottish nobleman and soldier. He was the son of Robert Alexander Dalzell, 6th Earl of Carnwath and Andulusia Browne.

== Military career ==
He was lieutenant-colonel of the 48th (Northamptonshire) Regiment of Foot between 1841 and 1853. He became Assistant Secretary for Scotland in 1854 and General Officer Commanding South-Eastern District in April 1861. Promoted to the rank of general in 1873, he also inherited the titles of his nephew, Henry Arthur Hew Dalzell, becoming Earl of Carnwath that same year. Lord Carnwath died unmarried on 28 April 1875 aged 75, in London. His titles were inherited by his younger brother, Harry Burrard Dalzell.

Military offices
Preceded by Robert Mansel	GOC South-Eastern District; 1861–1865	Succeeded by Sir Robert Garrett
Peerage of Scotland
Preceded by Henry Arthur Hew Dalzell	Earl of Carnwath; 1873–1875	Succeeded by Harry Burrard Dalzell
