= Thomas Dalziel =

English engraver (1823–1906)

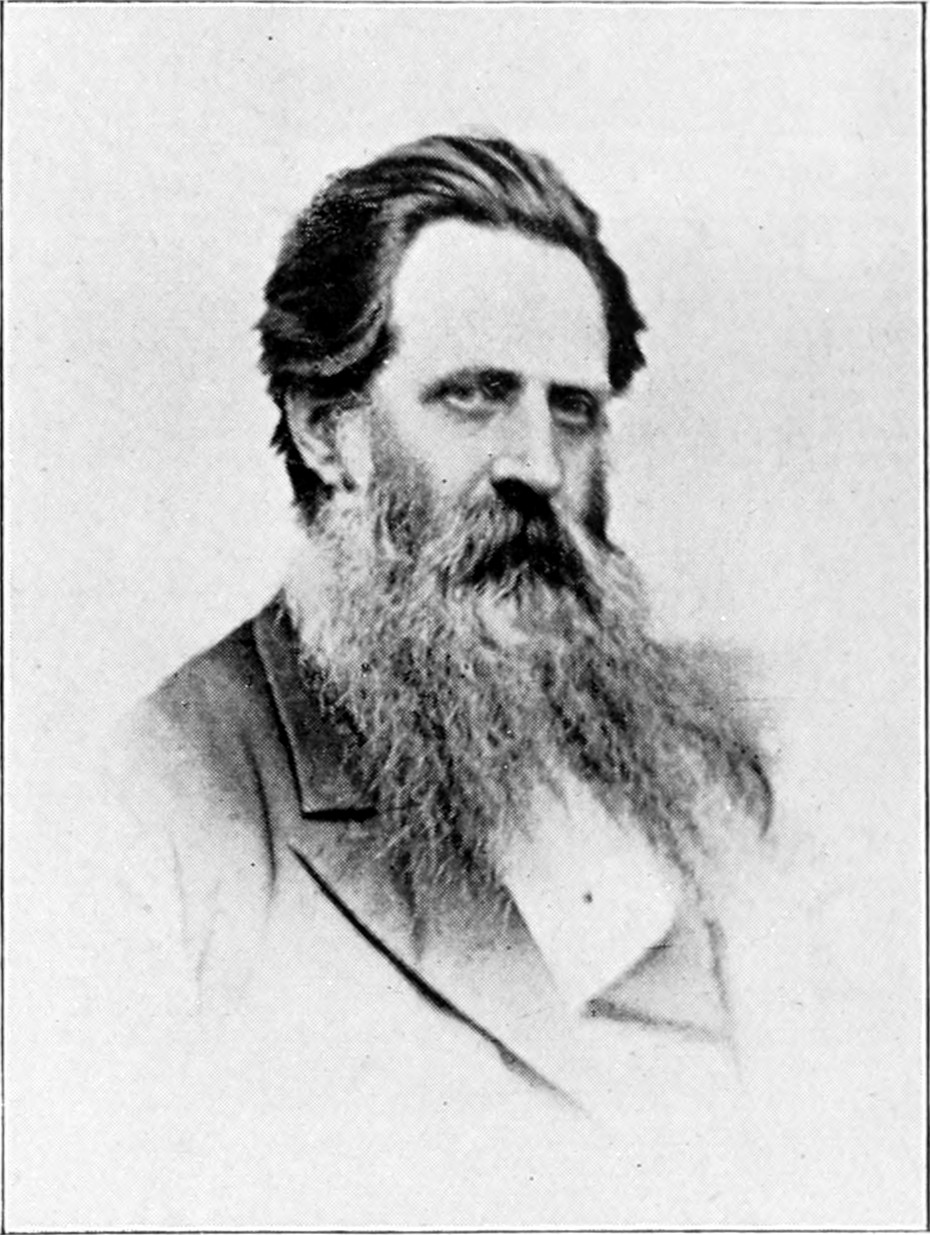
- Born: 9 May 1823; Wooler, Northumberland, England
- Died: 17 March 1906 (aged 82); Herne Bay, Kent, England
- Known for: Engraving, illustration

Thomas Bolton Gilchrist Septimus Dalziel (9 May 1823–17 March 1906) was an English engraver known chiefly for his illustrations of the work of Charles Dickens.

== Biography ==
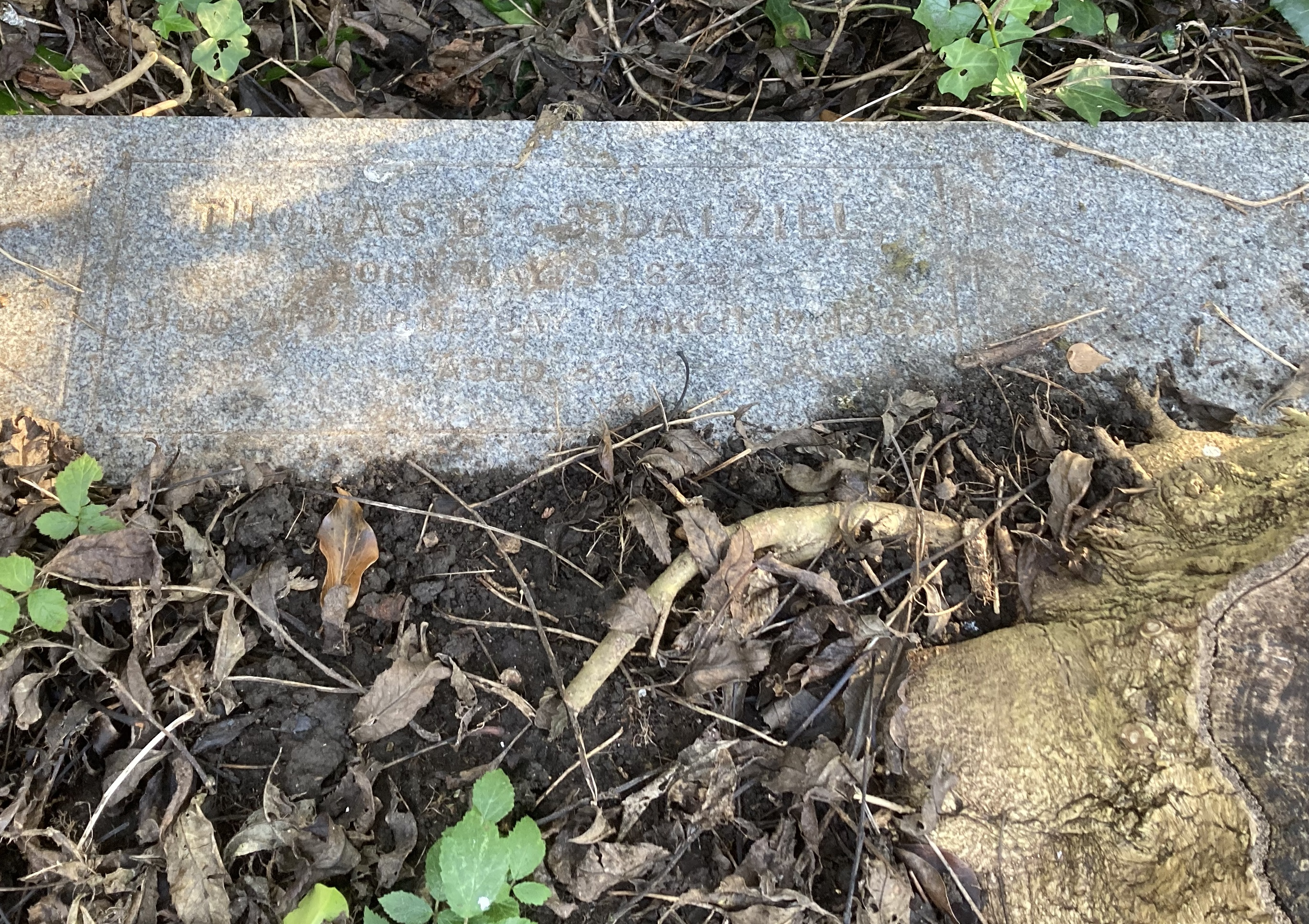
Grave of Thomas Dalziel in Highgate Cemetery

Thomas Dalziel was the youngest of The Brothers Dalziel, a prolific wood-engraving business in Victorian London, founded in 1839 by George Dalziel.

Thomas produced many illustrations for books published by the family firm. Many of his designs are considered by Philip Allingham (Faculty of Education, Lakehead University, Thunder Bay, Ontario) to be workmanlike rather than anything more inspired, although he considers Thomas Dalziel's illustrations for Bunyan's Pilgrim's Progress and The Arabian Nights to be above average.

In common with many of his siblings, he is buried on the western side of Highgate Cemetery.

== Other sources ==
- Dodgson, Campbell (1912). "Dalziel, Thomas Bolton Gilchrist Septimus" . In Lee, Sidney (ed.). Dictionary of National Biography (2nd supplement). London: Smith, Elder & Co.
- Burton, Anthony. "Dalziel family (per. 1840–1905)". Oxford Dictionary of National Biography (online ed.). Oxford University Press. doi:10.1093/ref:odnb/32703. (Subscription or UK public library membership required.)
