= Harry Dalzell, 10th Earl of Carnwath =

Colonel Harry Burrard Dalzell, 10th Earl of Carnwath (11 November 1804 – 1 November 1887) was a Scottish nobleman and soldier. He was the son of Robert Alexander Dalzell, 6th Earl of Carnwath and Andulusia Browne.

He married Isabella Campbell, daughter of Reverend Alexander Campbell, on 16 November 1827. They had the following children together:

- Eleanor Carnwath Dalzell (died 29 May 1867)
- Arthur John Dalzell (8 Apr 1829 – 9 April 1849)
- Captain Robert Augustus Dalzell (13 October 1838 − 20 April 1869)
- Lady Edith Isabella Dalzell (born 1843, died 7 May 1909), who married Admiral Edward Stanley Adeane (1836–1902)

He was commissioned in 1820, in the service of the Bengal Artillery and gained the rank of Colonel in 1835. He was Commissary of Ordnance between 1835 and 1842 at Agra, India.

In 1875, he inherited the titles of his brother, Arthur Alexander Dalzell, becoming Earl of Carnwath.

Lord Carnwath died on 1 November 1887 aged 82, in London. His titles were inherited by his nephew, Robert Harris Carnwath Dalzell.

Peerage of Scotland
Preceded by Arthur Alexander Dalzell	Earl of Carnwath; 1875–1887	Succeeded by Robert Harris Carnwath Dalzell
