= Gavin Dalzell, 2nd Earl of Carnwath =

Scottish nobleman and Royalist supporter (1627-1674)

Gavin Dalzell, 2nd Earl of Carnwath (1627−1674), styled by the courtesy title Lord Dalzell from 1639, was a Scottish nobleman and Royalist supporter during the English Civil War.

He was the son of Robert Dalzell, 1st Earl of Carnwath and Christian Douglas. He married, firstly, Margaret Carnegie, daughter of David Carnegie, Lord Carnegie and Lady Margaret Hamilton, circa 21 July 1637, with whom he had seven children. He married secondly by contract, Lady Mary Erskine, daughter of Alexander Erskine, Earl of Kellie and Lady Anne Seton, on 14 December 1663.

He was styled in Scotland as Earl of Carnwath between 25 February 1645 and 21 June 1654, after the title was declared to have descended by an Act of the Scottish Parliament, due to his father having been accused by the Convention of the Scottish Estate of betraying them to the King. He fought in the Battle of Worcester on the Royalist side, and was taken prisoner, being held for many years.

He died in June 1674, and his titles were inherited by his eldest son, James Dalzell.

Peerage of Scotland
Preceded by Robert Dalzell	Earl of Carnwath (Declared by Act of the Scottish Parliament to have descended 1645); 1654–1674	Succeeded by James Dalzell
