= Robert Anstruther Dalyell =

Sir Robert Anstruther Dalyell, KCSI, CSI (5 May 1831 – 18 January 1890) was a British administrator in India.

== Biography ==
The elder son of John Dalyell (died 7 October 1843) of Lingo in Fife, provost of Cupar, by his wife Jane (died 13 March 1865), eldest daughter of Brigadier-General Robert Anstruther and great-granddaughter of James Hamilton, 4th Duke of Hamilton.

He entered Cheltenham College in August 1842, and afterwards studied at the East India Company's college at Haileybury. He then entered the Madras Civil Service, landing at Madras on 1 January 1851. In 1861 he was nominated under-secretary to the Board of Revenue at Madras, and in 1867 became chief secretary. In 1866 he edited the standing orders of the Madras Board of Revenue, and as secretary of the central relief committee in the famine of 1865-6 he compiled the report which was subsequently published as the official guide for all similar operations in southern India.

In 1868 he was promoted to the secretaryship of the Madras government revenue department; in 1873 he was made a member of the Board of Revenue and chief secretary to the Madras government. Having been appointed to conduct a special inquiry into excise, with the rank of additional member of the Board of Revenue, he published a report in 1874 which secured his career. His researches extended over Madras, Mysore, the Punjab, and the North-Western Provinces, and his report gained him the thanks of the Secretary of State. It contained suggestions that were adopted as the basis of the excise system throughout a large part of southern India.

In 1875–6 he officiated as Chief Commissioner of Mysore, where he dealt successfully with the distress prevalent before the famine of 1877, and he represented Madras in the legislative council of India from 1873 to 1877. On 1 Nov. 1877 he was appointed a member of the Council of the Secretary of State for India, and in 1883–4 he was vice-president of the council. He retired in February 1879, and on 29 July was nominated CSI He took an active part in organising the Health Exhibition in 1884, and was royal commissioner to the Colonial Exhibition of 1886. In 1885 he received the honorary degree of LL.D. from St. Andrews University, and on 15 February 1887 he was nominated KCIE on the enlargement of the order.

He died unmarried at the New Club, Edinburgh, on 18 Jan. 1890, and was buried at St. Andrews on 23 Jan. in the cathedral burial-ground. He was captain of the Royal and Ancient Golf Club, and in 1869 was elected a member of the Royal Statistical Society of London.
