= Robert Dalzell, 6th Earl of Carnwath =

The Right Honourable The Earl of Carnwath
- Born: 13 February 1768
- Died: 1 January 1839 (aged 70)
- Spouse(s): Jane Parkes (m. 1789–1791) Andalusia Browne (m. 1794–1833) Jane Morrison (m. 1838–1839)
- Children: 14
- Military career
- Allegiance: United Kingdom
- Branch: British Army
- Service years: c.1798–1839
- Rank: Lieutenant-general
- Units: 1st Foot Guards; 60th Regiment of Foot
- Conflicts: French Revolutionary Wars; Napoleonic Wars; Peninsular War; Battle of Corunna; Walcheren Campaign

Lieutenant-General Robert Alexander Dalzell, 6th Earl of Carnwath (13 February 1768 – 1 January 1839), was a Scottish nobleman and soldier.

== Family ==
Carnwath was the son of Robert Dalzell (1738−1788) (himself the son of Robert Dalzell, 5th Earl of Carnwath) and Elizabeth Acklom. He was married three times. He married, firstly, Jane Parkes, daughter of Samuel Parkes, on 23 September 1789. They had one daughter, Elizabeth Dalzell (1790−1801). He married, secondly, Andalusia Browne, daughter of Lieutenant-Colonel Arthur Browne, on 26 April 1794. They had the following children together:

- Lady Emma Maria Dalzell (died 25 December 1882)
- Lady Eleanor Jane Elizabeth Dalzell (died 4 May 1835)
- Lady Charlotte Augusta Dalzell (died 27 December 1844)
- Robert Arthur Dalzell (1 May 1796 - 30 December 1799)
- Thomas Henry Dalzell, 7th Earl of Carnwath (2 September 1797 − 14 December 1867)
- General Arthur Alexander Dalzell, 9th Earl of Carnwath (15 September 1799 − 28 April 1875)
- Colonel Harry Burrard Dalzell, 10th Earl of Carnwath (11 November 1804 − 1 November 1887)
- Colonel Robert Alexander George Dalzell (19 August 1816 − 19 October 1878) (himself the father of the eleventh and thirteenth Earls of Carnwath)

Carnwath married finally, Jane Morrison née Carnell, daughter of John Carnell, on 11 October 1838.

== Titles ==
Robert Dalzell Restoration Act 1826
- Act of Parliament
- Parliament of the United Kingdom
- Long title: An Act for the Restoration of Major General Robert Alexander Dalzell to the Dignity and Title of Earl of Carnwath.
- Citation: 7 Geo. 4. c. 52 Pr.

Dates
- Royal assent: 26 May 1826

The titles of Earl of Carnwath, Lord Dalzell and Liberton and the Dalzell baronetcy of Glenae had been forfeited by a Writ of Attainder for treason for the fifth Earl's support of the Jacobite cause in an unsuccessful rebellion in 1715 known as the Fifteen or Lord Mar's Revolt. Lieutenant-General Dalzell was to have the attainder reversed by an act of Parliament, the Robert Dalzell Restoration Act 1826 (7 Geo. 4. c. 52 Pr.), on 26 May 1826, thereby having his grandfather's titles restored to him.

Carnwath died on 1 January 1839 aged 70, and was succeeded in his titles by his son, Thomas Dalzell.

Peerage of Scotland
Preceded by Robert Dalzell	Earl of Carnwath; 1826–1839	Succeeded by Thomas Henry Dalzell
