= The Brothers Dalziel =

Victorian English wood carving business

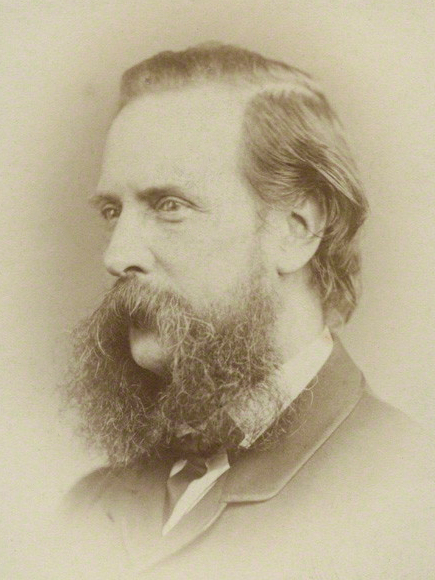
George Dalziel in the 1860s

The Brothers Dalziel (pronounced /diːˈɛl/ dee-ELL) was a prolific wood-engraving business in Victorian London, founded in 1839 by George Dalziel.

== The Dalziel family ==
In 1840, George (1 December 1815 – 4 August 1902) was joined in the business by his brother Edward Dalziel (1817–1905) and in subsequent years they were joined by their sister Margaret (1819–1894), brother John (1822–1869), and brother Thomas Dalziel (1823–1906). Along with at least three older brothers and one younger, they were children of the artist Alexander Dalziel of Wooler in Northumberland.

George Dalziel trained under the wood-engraver Charles Gray in London from around 1835.

== Business activity ==
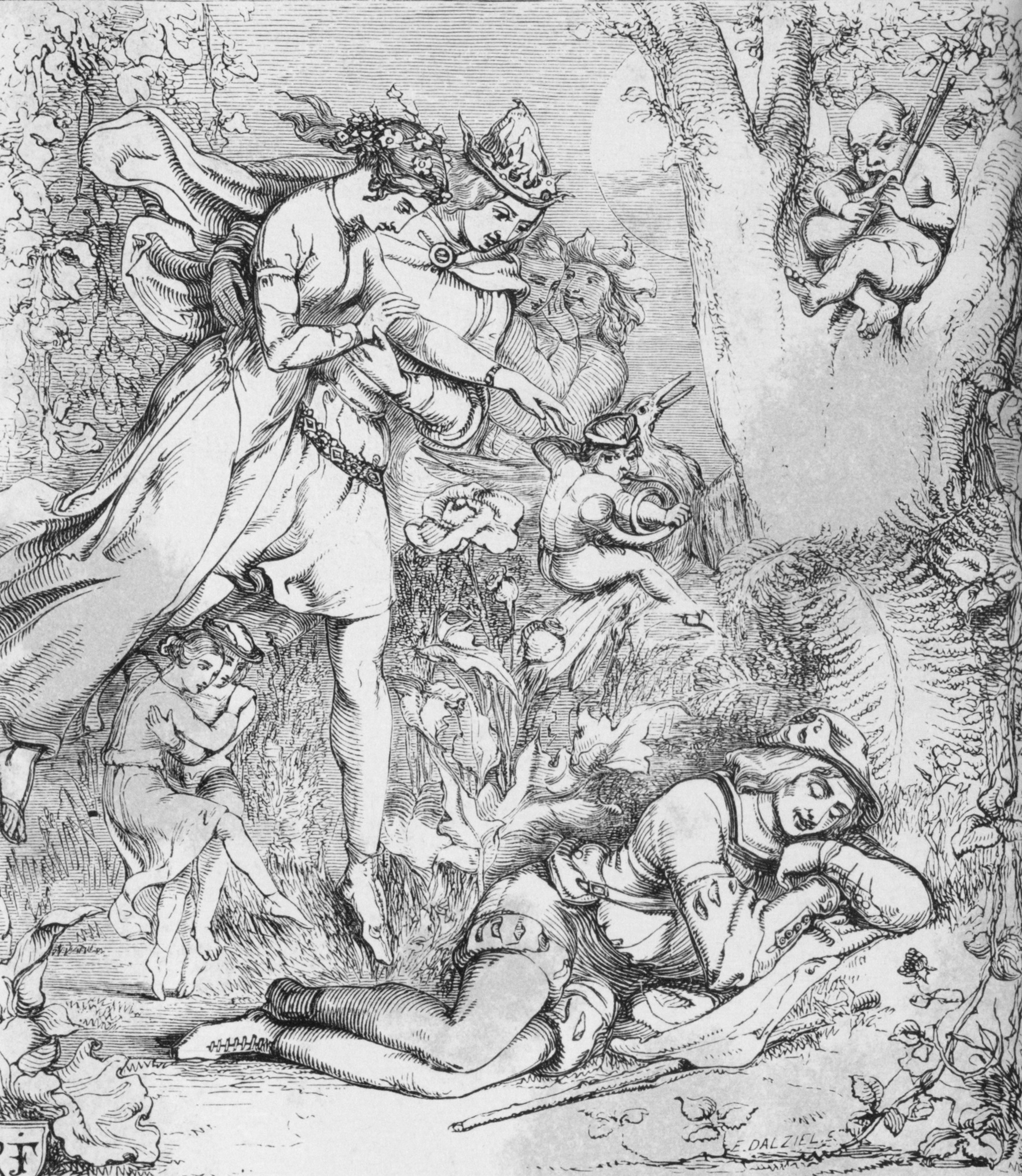
The Mad Pranks of Robin Goodfellow, by John Franklin, engraving by Edward Dalziel, 1845

The Dalziel Brothers worked with many important Victorian artists, producing illustrations for the burgeoning magazine and book market of the period.

An example of the Dalziel Brothers' collaborations with illustrator Richard Doyle, in Sleeping Beauty (1868).

Among the artists they worked with were Arthur Boyd Houghton, Richard Doyle, Myles Birket Foster, John Gilbert, William Holman Hunt, John Everett Millais, John Proctor, Dante Gabriel Rossetti and James McNeill Whistler. They cut the illustrations to Edward Lear's Book of Nonsense (1862); Lewis Carroll's Alice in Wonderland and Through the Looking-Glass.

They also produced independent ventures, most notably The Parables of Our Lord and Saviour Jesus Christ (London: Routledge, 1864), illustrated by Millais, and contributed humorous cartoons to magazines such as Fun, which George and Edward acquired in 1865.

Until the advent of photo-mechanical processes c. 1880, they were pre-eminent in their trade. Examples of their work can be seen in the Victoria and Albert Museum in London.

At the end of the nineteenth century they collaborated on an autobiographical summary of their work: The Brothers Dalziel, A Record of Work, 1840–1890 published by Methuen.

George Dalziel is buried in a family vault in the Egyptian Avenue in Highgate Cemetery. Edward Dalziel is buried in a family vault in the Circle of Lebanon in Highgate Cemetery.

== Gallery ==
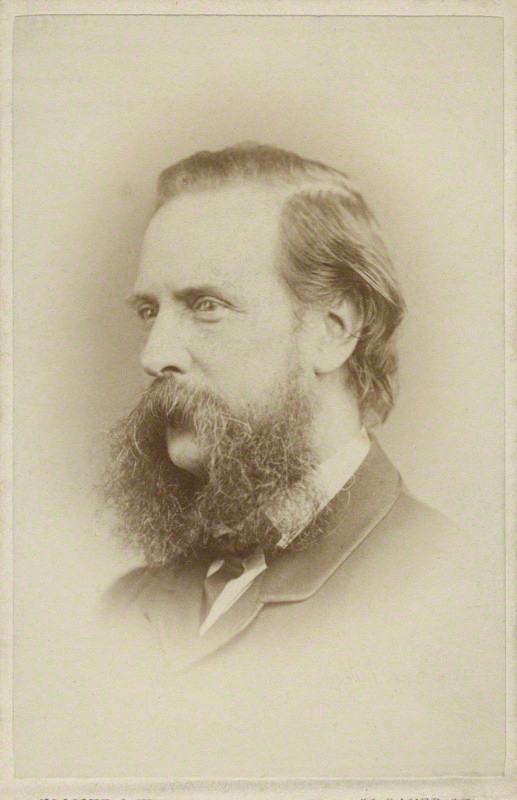
George Dalziel

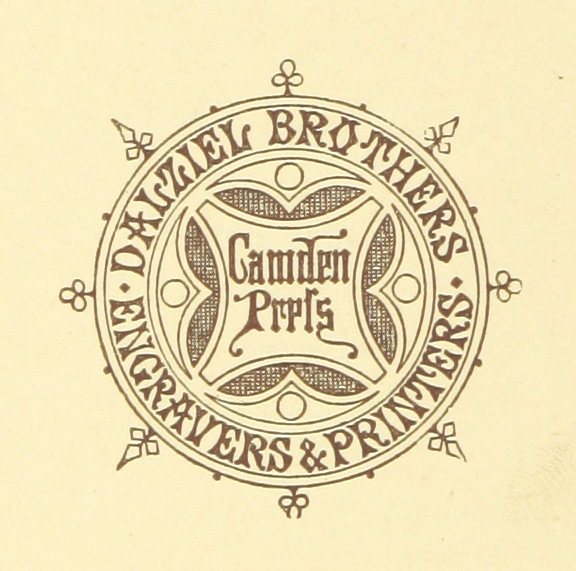
Camden Press seal

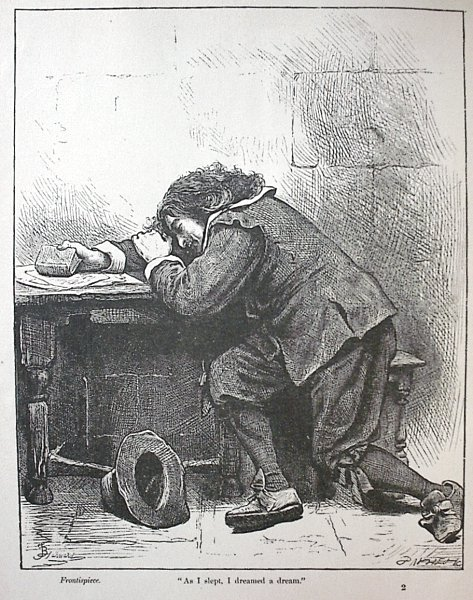
"As I slept, I dreamed a dream" (The Pilgrim's Progress)

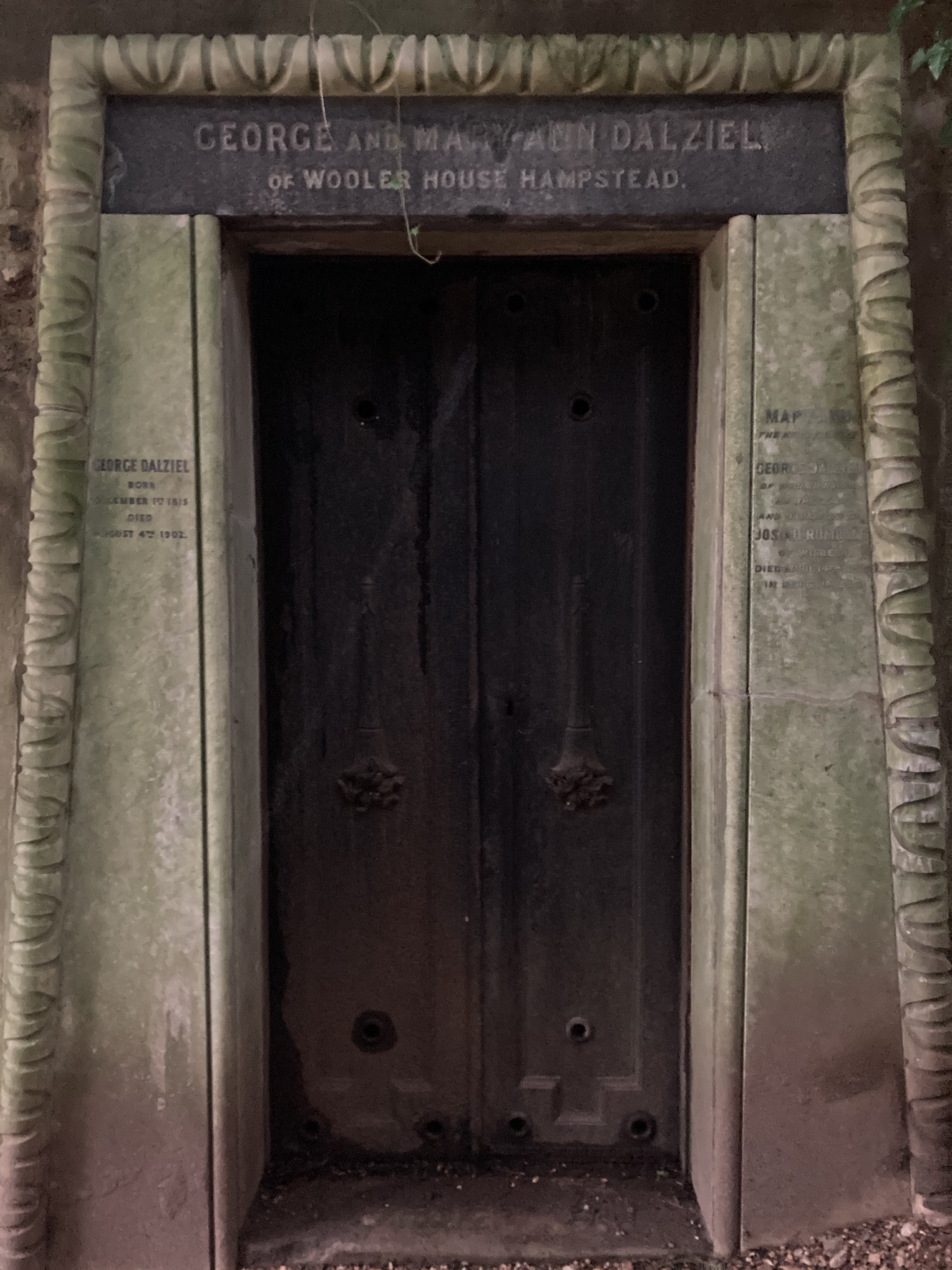
Family vault of George Dalziel in the Egyptian Avenue in Highgate Cemetery

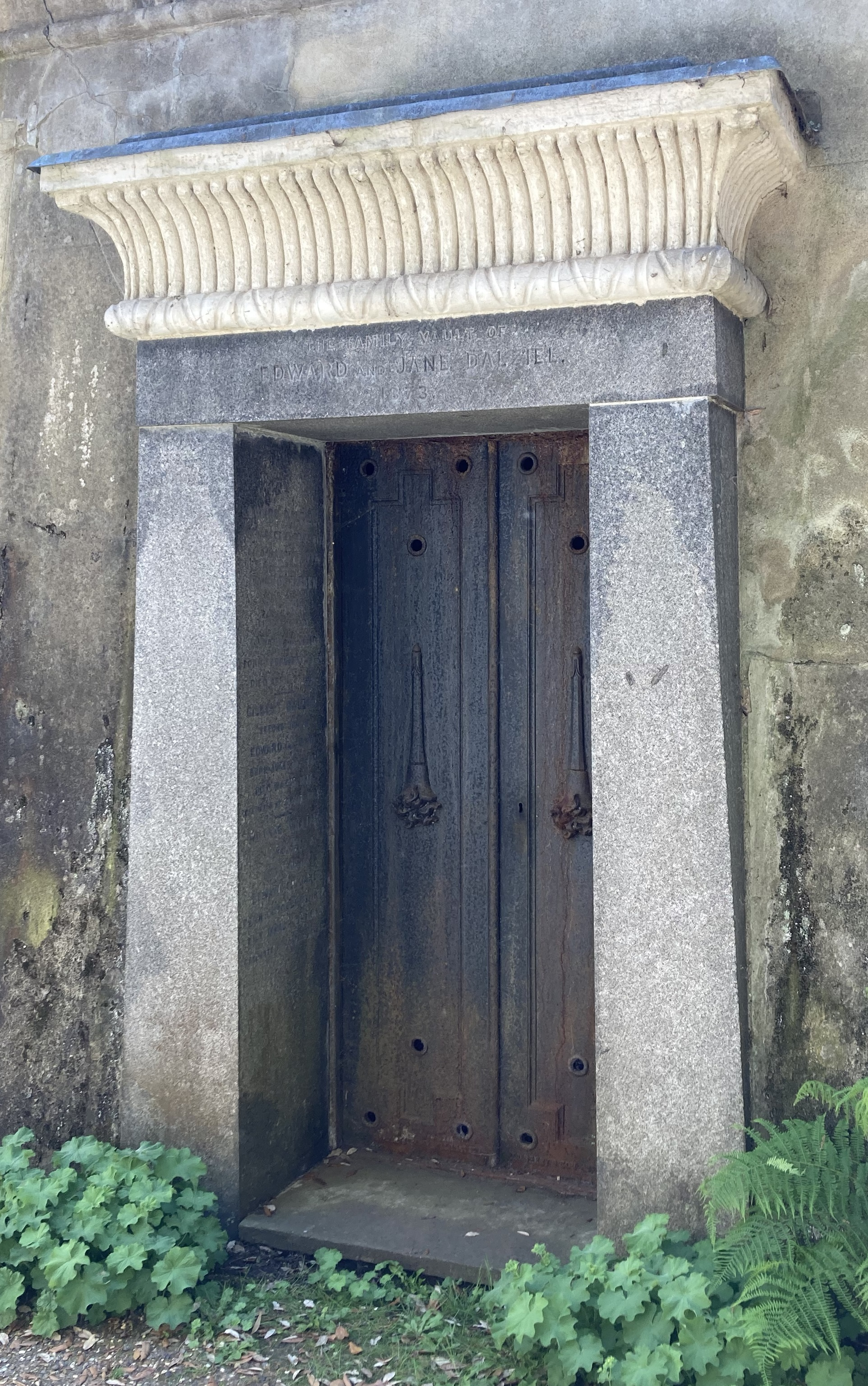
Vault of Edward Dalziel in the Lebanon Circle in Highgate Cemetery

== Sources ==
- "Obituary – George Dalziel". The Times. No. 36841. London. 8 August 1902. p. 3.
