= Sir John Dalzell, 2nd Baronet =

Scottish politician

Sir John Dalzell, 2nd Baronet (died 1689) was a Scottish politician. He was the son of Sir Robert Dalzell, 1st Baronet and Violet Riddell.

He married Harriet Murray, daughter of Sir William Murray, 1st Baronet, of Stanhope on 16 June 1686.

He succeeded to his father's title of Baronet on his father's death in April 1686. Sir John held the office of Member of Parliament for the sheriffdom of Dumfries in 1686 and 1689.

He died in March 1689, and was succeeded in his baronetcy by his eldest son, Robert Dalzell, who was also to later succeed his second cousin as Earl of Carnwath.

== See also ==
- Earl of Carnwath

Baronetage of Nova Scotia
Preceded by Robert Dalzell	Baronet (of Glenae); 1686–1689	Succeeded by Robert Dalzell
