= Sable (tincture) =

Tincture of black in heraldry

- Class: Colour
- Non-heraldic equivalent: Black

Monochromatic designations
- Hatching pattern
- Tricking abbr.: s., sa.

Poetic designations
- Heavenly body: Saturn
- Jewel: Diamond
- Virtue: Constancy or Prudence
- Flower: Nightshade

In heraldry, sable (/ˈseɪbəl/) is the tincture equivalent to black. It is one of the five dark tinctures called colours.

Sable is portrayed in heraldic hatching by criss-crossing perpendicular lines. Sable is indicated by the abbreviation s. or sa. when a coat of arms is tricked; sometimes sable areas are simply filled in black instead of being hatched or tricked.

== Etymology ==
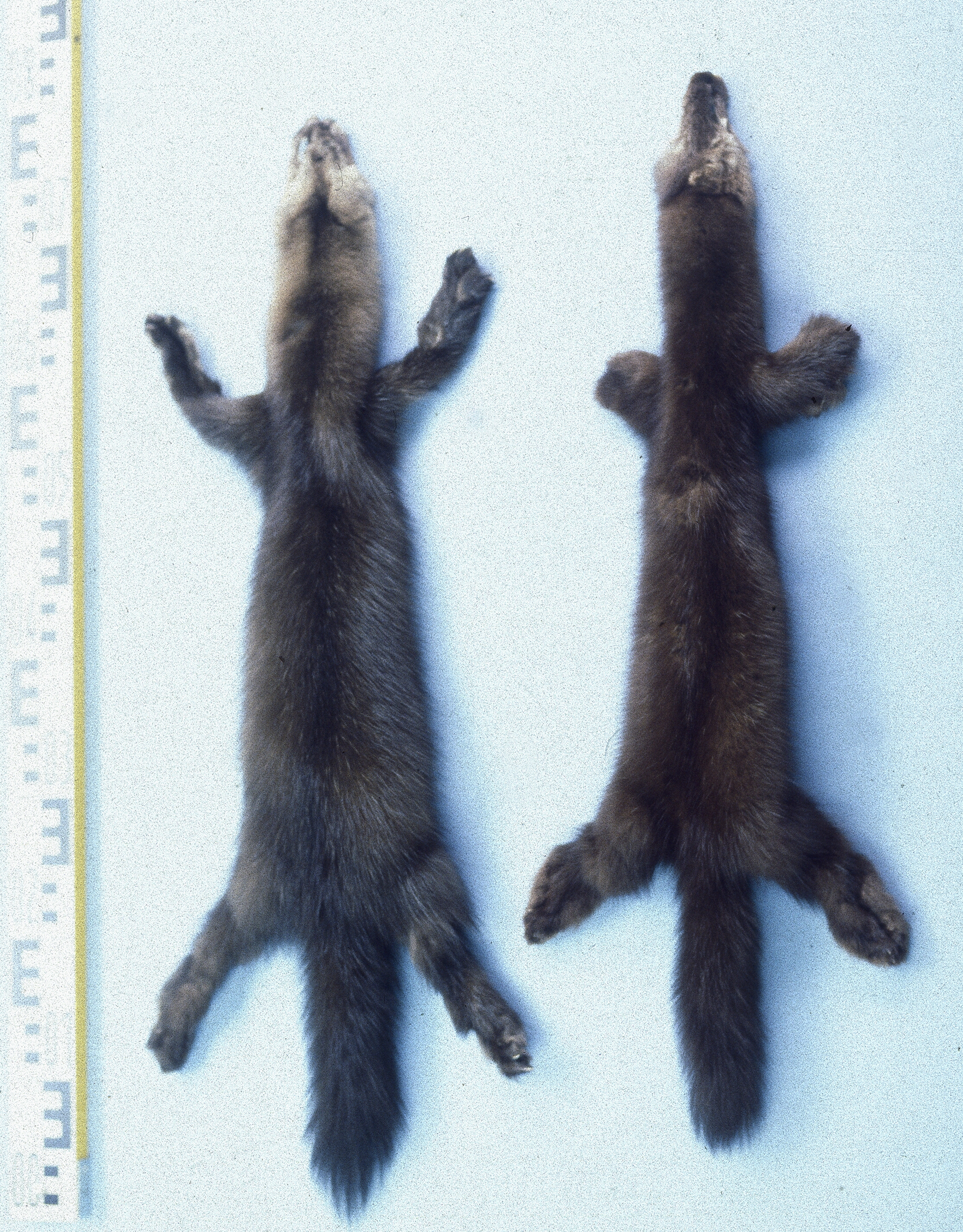
Black sable skins

The word sable can be traced back to Middle English, Anglo-French, and ultimately to the Middle Low German sabel, which refers to a species of marten known as a sable (Martes zibellina). This is related to the Middle High German zobel, which is of Slavic origin and akin to the Russian соболь sobol', which likewise refers to the sable. Since at least the 14th century, sable has been used as a synonym for the colour black.

Both sable and negro are used for black in Spanish heraldry. In Portuguese, black is known as negro, and in Germany the colour is called Schwarz. Sabel is the spelling used in Dutch heraldry.

== Poetic meanings ==
The different tinctures are traditionally associated with particular heavenly bodies, precious stones, virtues, and flowers, although these associations have been mostly disregarded by serious heraldists. Sable is associated with:

- Of jewels, the diamond
- Of heavenly bodies, Saturn
- Of virtues, constancy or prudence
- Of flowers, the herb nightshade, in these circumstances also called dwal

== Sable in Central Europe ==
Sable is considered a colour in British and French heraldry, and contrasts with lighter metals, argent and Or. However, in the heraldry of Germany, Poland and other parts of Central Europe, sable is not infrequently placed on colour fields. As a result, a sable cross may appear on a red shield, or a sable bird may appear on a blue or a red field, as in the arms of Albania.

In Hungary, for example, one can find examples of sable on gules and azure fields as early as the sixteenth century in the arms of the family Kanizsai (granted in 1519): Azure, an eagle's wing sable taloned Or between a decrescent argent and a sun Or. (Note: In the original Hungarian: "álló, csücskös talpú tárcsapajzs kék mezejében, lebegő arany saslábon fekete sasszárny, jobbról ezüst félholdtól, balról nyolcágú arany csillagtól kísérve.") Another early Hungarian example was granted in 1628 to the family Karomi Bornemisza: Per fess gules, an eagle displayed sable crowned Or, and azure, a buffalo's head cabossed sable maintaining in its mouth a fish (argent?). (Note: In the original Hungarian: "álló, tojásdad pajzs vágott, felső vörös mezejében jobbra fordult fejű, vágásvonalon álló, koronás fekete sas, az alsó kék mezőben fekete bölényfej, szájában hallall.")

Polish examples abound as early as the fifteenth century. Józef Szymański includes no fewer than seven examples of sable primary charges on either gules or azure fields out of the approximately 200 shields from this period whose blazons are known. These include the arms of Corvin, "Azure, a raven sable with a circlet or in its beak"; Kownaty, "Gules, a trumpet sable with a cord or, a Passion cross of the same issuing from its opening"; and Słońce, "Gules, a sphere radiant sable, its centre argent". In addition to the seven major examples, he describes occasional variants for the arms of some rody which also use sable charges on azure or gules fields.

Sable charges on gules fields also appear in the armory used in Lithuania. This is not surprising, since a significant fraction of Lithuania's personal coats of arms are of Polish origin, so there is a certain similarity of style. Among these coats are those of Great Žemaitija: "a black bear with an argent chain on its neck on a field gules".

== Gallery ==
Arms of Dalziel family of Scotland

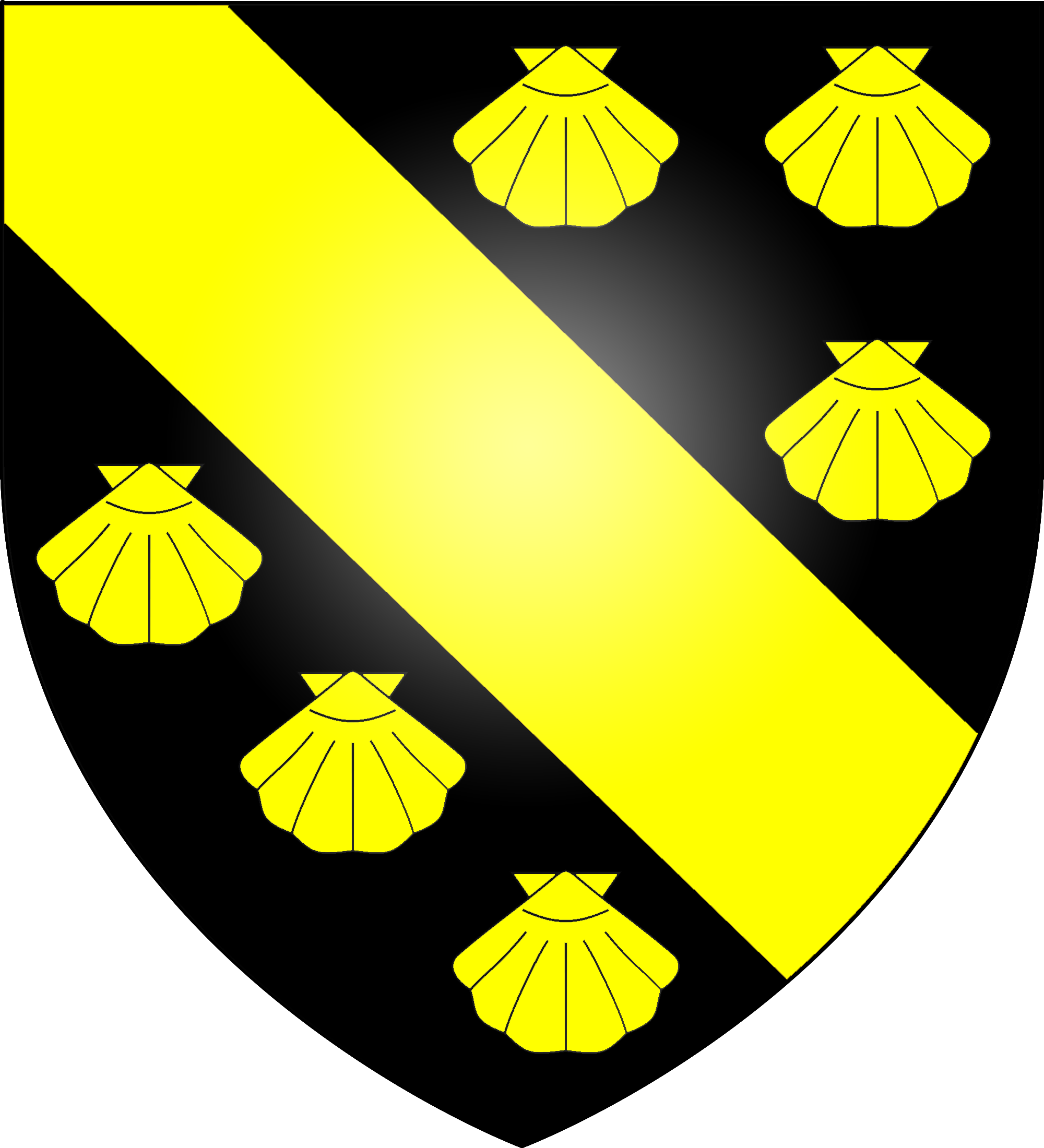
Arms of the Foljambe family of Walton, Osberton and Aldwark.

Coat of arms of Frank II van Borselen.

Coat of arms of Hückelhoven, Germany.

Coat of arms of François-Antoine de Boissy d'Anglas.

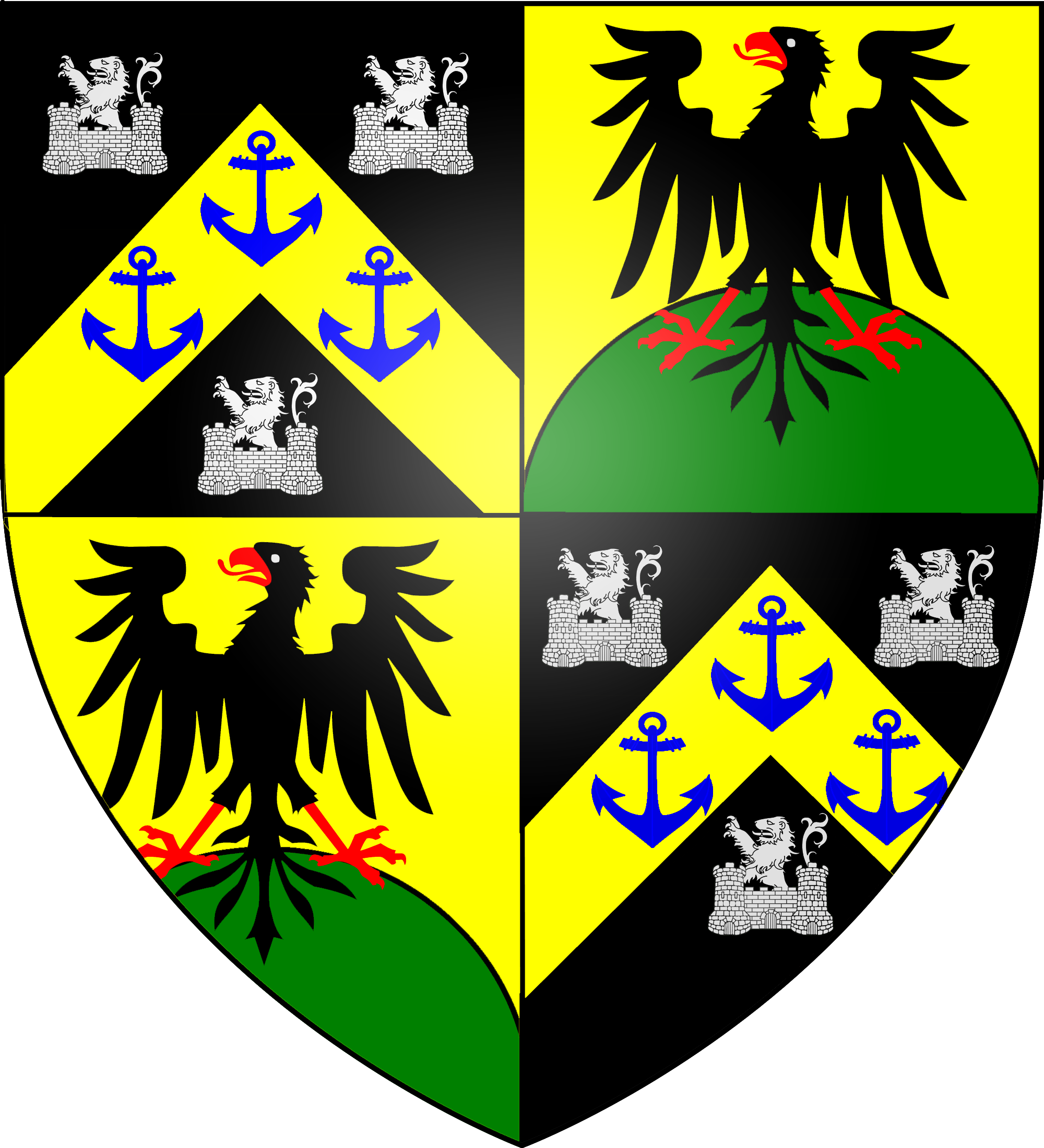
Arms of the Castelyn family of London.

The arms of Albania.

The historical coat of arms of Samogitia

Arms of Paulet, Marquess of Winchester

Hatched version of the arms of Haßmersheim; the branch of vine plant Sable is coloured solid black.

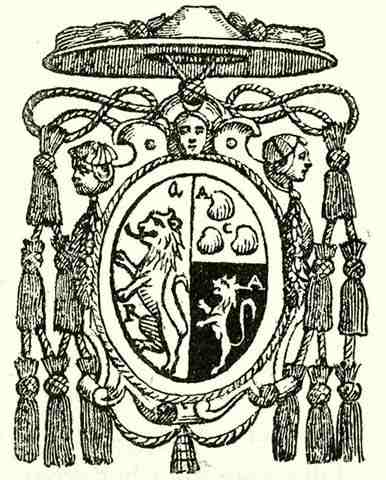
Tricking of the arms of Giovanni d'Aragona; the sable quarter is coloured solid black instead of being tricked as s. or sa.
