= Sammy Dalzell =

Irish weightlifter

Personal information
- Nationality: British (Northern Irish)
- Born: 2 June 1933 Belfast, Northern Ireland
- Died: 29 November 1977 (aged 44) Belfast, Northern Ireland

Sport
- Sport: Weightlifting
- Event: Bantamweight
- Club: Shankill YMCA; Vikings, Short and Harland; Richmond WC

Samuel Dalzell (2 June 1933 – 29 November 1977) was a weightlifter from Northern Ireland, who represented Ireland at the 1960 Summer Olympics and Northern Ireland at the British Empire and Commonwealth Games (now Commonwealth Games).

== Biography ==
At the 1960 Olympic Games in Rome, he competed in the men's featherweight event.

Dalzell was a member of the Shankhill YMCA and then the Vikings, Short and Harland club and attended three Commonwealth Games in 1958, 1962 and 1966. He represented the 1958 Northern Irish Team at the 1958 British Empire and Commonwealth Games in Cardiff, Wales, participating in the 56kg bantamweight, finishing fifth behind Reg Gaffley from South Africa.

After the Games in November 1958, Dalzell retained his bantamweight title at the Irish Weightlifting Championships.

Dalzell also competed at the 1962 British Empire and Commonwealth Games in Perth, Australia, in the bantamweight category. He went to a third Games when representing the 1966 Northern Irish Team at the 1966 British Empire and Commonwealth Games in Kingston, Jamaica, participating in the 56kg bantamweight category.
