= Rick Dalzell =

American businessman

Richard Lane Dalzell (born April 7, 1957, in Kentucky) was the chief information officer and senior vice president of Amazon.com from 1997 until November 2007. During his ten years at Amazon.com, he was the driving force behind the growth of technology, software and services. Dalzell had been a corporate officer at Amazon since August 1997, when he was named vice president (VP) and chief information officer (CIO). He was styled a senior VP in October 2000 and was named to senior VP, worldwide architecture and platform software and CIO, in November 2001. He retired from Amazon.com on November 16, 2007.

Prior to joining Amazon.com in 1997, Dalzell was vice president of information systems at Wal-Mart starting in 1990. At Walmart he developed their datawarehouse strategy from the ground up, giving their suppliers direct access to demographic sales information. From 1987 to 1990, Dalzell acted as the business development manager for E-Systems, Inc. Prior to joining E-Systems, Inc. he served seven years in the United States Army as a teleprocessing officer. Dalzell received a B.S. in engineering from the United States Military Academy at West Point in 1979.
