= Robert Dalzell, 5th Earl of Carnwath =

Scottish nobleman and Jacobite supporter

Robert Dalzell, 5th Earl of Carnwath, (1687–1737), known as Sir Robert Dalzell, 3rd Baronet from 1689 until 1702, was a Scottish nobleman and Jacobite supporter during the 1715 Jacobite uprising. For this he was attainted in 1716, and from that point known as Robert Dalzell.

== Life ==
Lord Carnwath was the son and heir of Sir John Dalzell, 2nd Baronet and Harriet Murray. He was also the heir male of his cousin John Dalzell who was fourth Earl of Carnwath and fifth Lord Dalzell. The Earldom has a special remainder to heirs male whatsoever bearing the name and Arms of Dalzell. This means that it can pass to the senior male heir, whoever that is, outside of the line descending from the first holder the title, should that line become extinct. There is not the usual requirement that the heir be of the body of the original holder. The senior heir male is merely required to have the surname and Arms of Dalzell, if not by birth, then by Deed poll and Royal Licence.

Succession to the Earldom by this special remainder was therefore first to occur on the death of the fourth Earl in 1702, when the line of the first Earl became extinct. The Earldom was therefore able to pass through collateral succession to Lord Carnwath, the senior heir of the first Lord, and a collateral heir of the first Earl, being the great-grandson of the first Earl's brother. But for this remainder, he would have inherited only the Lordship of Dalzell, and the Earldom would have then become extinct.

Lord Carnwath was married four times. He married, firstly, Lady Grace Montgomerie, daughter of Alexander Montgomerie, 9th Earl of Eglinton and Margaret Cochrane, on 19 January 1710. They had two daughters together, Lady Margaret Dalzell (died 18 April 1781) and Lady Euphemia Dalzell (born 12 February 1703).

He married, secondly, Grizell Urquhart, daughter of Alexander Urquhart, on 3 June 1720. They had one son, Alexander Dalzell (2 February 1721 – 3 April 1787), who would have been Earl of Carnwath, but for the attainder.

He married, thirdly, Margaret Hamilton, daughter of John Hamilton, on 15 November 1728.

He married, fourthly, Margaret Vincent, daughter of Thomas Vincent and Isabel Packer, on 19 June 1735 at Worksop, Nottinghamshire. They had one son, Robert Dalzell (1738 – 29 July 1788) who was father of Lieutenant General Robert Alexander Dalzell, who was to have the attainder reversed in his favour.

Lord Carnwath fought in the Battle of Preston on 14 November 1715, for the Jacobites, and was taken prisoner. For his role in the rebellion, the Hanoverian government passed a Writ of Attainder for treason against Lord Carnwath in 1716 as punishment for his part in the rebellion, sentencing him to death, with his peerages and baronetcy attainted at that time. His execution was first delayed, then in 1717 remitted by virtue of the Indemnity Act.

He died on 4 August 1737 at Kirkmichael, Dumfrieshire, Scotland.

Peerage of Scotland
Preceded by John Dalzell	Earl of Carnwath; 1702–1716 (Forfeited by Writ of Attainder 1716)	Succeeded by Robert Alexander Dalzell (Restored by Act of Parliament 1826)
Baronetage of Nova Scotia
Preceded by John Dalzell	Baronet (of Glenae); 1689–1716	Succeeded by Robert Alexander Dalzell
