= William Ronald Dalzell =

William Ronald Dalzell

William Ronald Dalzell (29 March 1910 - 10 January 2004) was an art teacher, book illustrator, author, radio broadcaster and lecturer on the arts. He wrote and broadcast over 170 scripts on arts subjects for the BBC. His last published work was a major history of London published by Michael Joseph in 1981.

== Early life and family ==
Dalzell was born in Gravesend, Kent, in 1910. He was educated at the Gravesend Grammar School and then Gravesend School of Art and the Royal College of Art, London (ARCA). He married Mary Wells and had two sons, Roger, born 21 June 1938, and Julian, born 30 March 1948.

== Career ==
Dalzell worked as an art teacher at The John Roan School for Boys, Maze Hill, Blackheath, London, up to 1947. During the Second World War, he was a medical orderly and a photographic reconnaissance interpreter in North Africa and Italy. From 1947 to 1970, he was an art master at Bedford School. He was also a book illustrator and author on the arts. His history of English architecture, Architecture: The indispensable art (1962) was thought competent enough by The Times, but criticised for devoting half its length to architecture before 1800 and thus missing the opportunity to explain the architecture that readers were most likely to see around them. In 1981, the Illustrated London News described The Shell Guide to the History of London as strong on detail and facts (496 pages including plates) with an emphasis particularly on Roman London and reconstruction after the Great Fire, but a lesser emphasis on the more modern period while still emphasising the ever-changing nature of the city. Valerie Pearl in The London Review of Books also noted the absence of modern buildings and questioned whether the history of London could properly be told purely through the examples of surviving buildings.

Dalzell wrote and broadcast over 170 scripts on arts subjects for the BBC. In 1939, he appeared on BBC Radio talking about "How to Design posters". He was the art critic for many years on BBC Radio's Children's Hour. He was also a member of the lecture panel of the Council of Industrial Design. After his retirement from teaching in 1970, he devoted himself to writing and lecturing.

Dalzell was a fellow of the Royal Institute of British Architects.

== Death ==
Dalzell died in Bedford on 10 January 2004, where in his later days he had been living at Dial House Nursing Home.

== Selected publications ==
- Living Artists of the Eighteenth Century. Hutchinson, London, 1960.
- Architecture: The indispensable art. Michael Joseph, London, 1962.
- Know the Gallery. E.P. Publishing in association with the National Gallery, 1965.
- Architecture. Hamlyn, 1969. ISBN 0600001377 (Portuguese edition 1977)
- London and its Museums. Knorr & Hirth, Ahrbeck/Hannover, 1971. ISBN 978-3782121071
- The Shell Guide to the History of London. Michael Joseph, London, 1981. ISBN 978-0718120153
