= Bobby Dalziel =

Scottish footballer

Personal information
- Full name: Robert Dalziel
- Place of birth: Scotland
- Position: Inside left

Youth career
- Craigmark Bruntonians

Senior career*
Years	Team	Apps	(Gls)
1948–1949	Kilmarnock	1	(0)
1949–1950	Third Lanark	4	(1)
1950–1956	Queen's Park	119	(30)
- * Club domestic league appearances and goals

Robert Dalziel was a Scottish amateur football inside left who made over 110 appearances in the Scottish League for Queen's Park. He also played for Third Lanark and Kilmarnock.
