= Robert Dalzell, 1st Earl of Carnwath =

Scottish nobleman, royalist supporter

Robert Dalzell, 1st Earl of Carnwath, PC (1611 – 21 June 1654), known as Robert Dalzell, 2nd Lord Dalzell from 1636 to 1639, was a Scottish nobleman and Royalist supporter during the English Civil War.

He married, firstly, Christian Douglas, daughter of Sir William Douglas and secondly, Katherine Arington, daughter of John Arington.

He had succeeded his father as the second Lord Dalzell in 1636, and was made a Privy Counsellor of Scotland in June 1638. He was further elevated within the Peerage on 21 April 1639 when he was created Earl of Carnwath and Lord Dalzell and Liberton in the Peerage of Scotland by King Charles I, with a remainder to heirs male whatsoever bearing the name and arms of Dalzell.

Lord Carnwath was accused by the Convention of the Scottish Estate of betraying them to the King in 1643. He was fined £10,000 and his titles were forfeited and he was sentenced to death by an Act of the Scottish Parliament on 25 Feb 1645. This Act also provided "that his lawful son Gavin, Lord Dalzell, shall enjoy not only all the estates but the title of Earl as if his father were dead". From this time his son, Gavin Dalzell was known in Scotland as the second Earl of Carnwath, however he was still referred to as the Earl of Carnwath in Royalist circles. His death sentence was not to be carried out.

He went on to fight with King Charles I at the battle of Naseby on 14 June 1645, where he received some blame for the loss of the battle. King Charles, attempting to rally his men, rode forward but as he did so, Lord Carnwath seized his bridle and pulled him back, fearing for the King's safety. Carnwath's action was misinterpreted by the royalist soldiers as a signal to move back, leading to a collapse of their position. The military balance then tipped decisively in favour of Parliament.

Lord Carnwath was taken prisoner after the Battle of Worcester 1651, and committed to the Tower of London for a time. He later died on 21 June 1654.

== Bibliography ==
- Cust, Richard (2005), Charles I: A Political Life, Harlow: Pearson Education, ISBN 0-582-07034-1
- Gregg, Pauline (1981), King Charles I, London: Dent, ISBN 0-460-04437-0
- Holmes, Clive (2006), Why was Charles I Executed?, London & New York: Hambledon Continuum, ISBN 1-85285-282-8

Peerage of Scotland
New creation	Earl of Carnwath (Titles declared by Act of the Scottish Parliament to have descended 1645); 1639–1654	Succeeded by Gavin Dalzell
Preceded by Robert Dalzell	Lord Dalzell; 1636–1654	Succeeded by Gavin Dalzell
