= Robert Dalzell, 1st Lord Dalzell =

Scottish nobleman

Robert Dalzell, 1st Lord Dalzell (c. 1550−1636), known as Sir Robert Dalzell from 1602 to 1628, was a Scottish nobleman who raised to the Peerage as a Lord of Parliament in the Peerage of Scotland on 18 September 1628, by King Charles I.

He was the son of Robert Dalzell of that Ilk and Janet Hamilton. He married Margaret Crichton, daughter of Sir Robert Crichton of Cluny on 28 March 1580, and together they had eight children.

He died in July 1636 and was succeeded in his peerage title by his eldest son, Robert Dalzell, who was later to be created Earl of Carnwath. His second son, the Honourable Sir John Dalzell, was to be the father of Sir Robert Dalzell, 1st Baronet, whose descendants were to be subsequent Earls of Carnwath.

== See also ==
- Earl of Carnwath

Peerage of Scotland
| New creation | Lord Dalzell; 1628–1636 | Succeeded by Robert Dalzell |
