= Eldon House =

Coordinates: 42.98484°N 81.25545°W

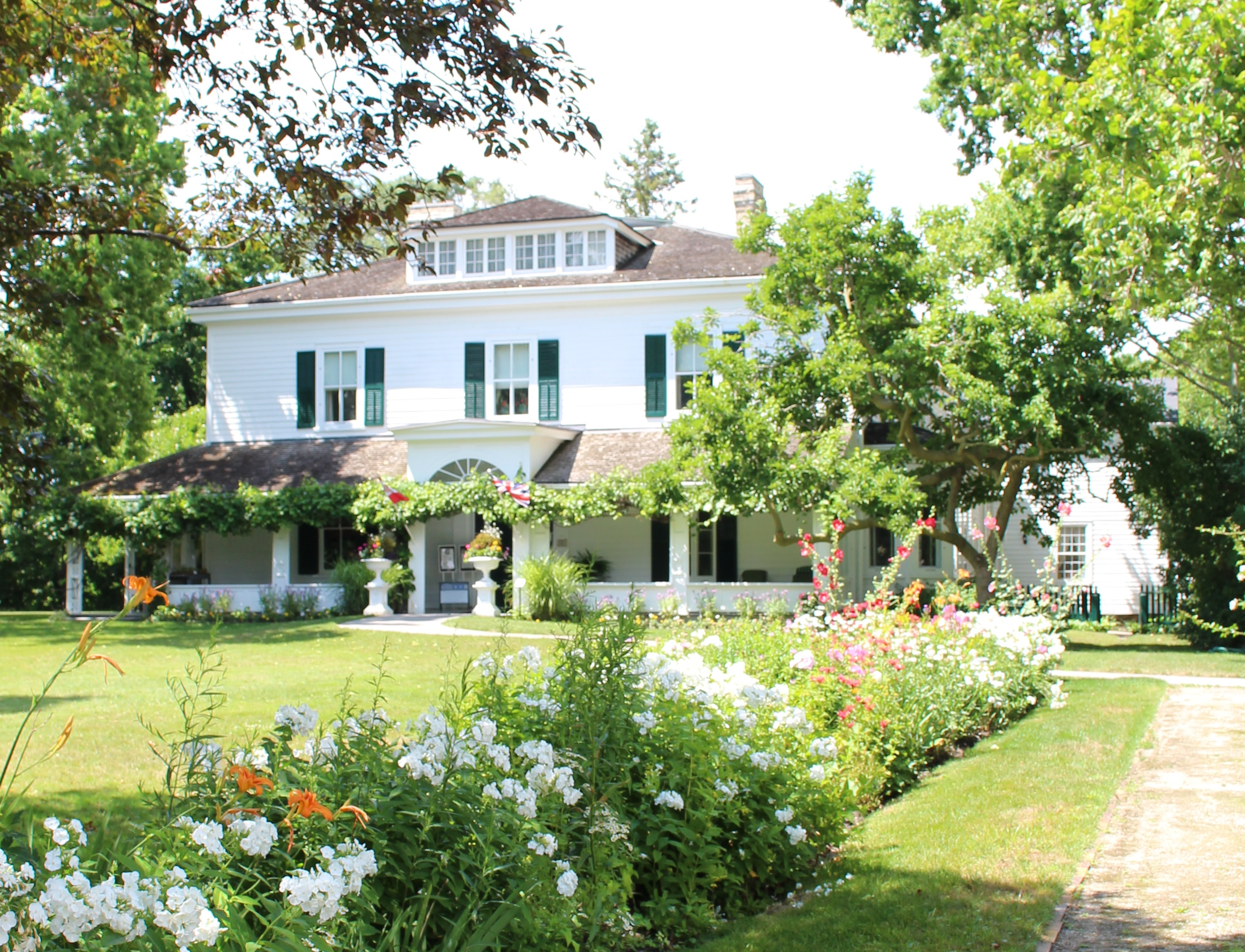
- Interactive map of Eldon House
- Location: 481 Ridout Street North; London, Ontario Canada

History
- Built: 1834
- Original use: Residential house

Site notes
- Area: 11 acres
- Architectural style: Georgian
- Current use: Museum
- Owner: City of London
- Website: www.eldonhouse.ca/

Eldon House is a historic house and museum located in London, Ontario. The Eldon House property was converted into a public park, now called Harris Park. Eldon House is the oldest continued residence in the city. It was inhabited by the family of John and Amelia Harris from 1834 until they gave it to the City of London in 1959. The original owner, Captain John Harris, named Eldon House after the Earl of Eldon, whom he admired.

As a museum, Eldon House offers tours and programming including yearly events such as Canada Day, Victorian Christmas, and in city-wide celebrations of heritage and culture.

The Museum is affiliated with CMA, CHIN, and Virtual Museum of Canada.

== History ==
This Georgian property was built in 1834, originally on 11 acres (45,000 m^{2}) of land.

Captain John Harris met his wife Amelia Ryerse in 1815. The Ryerse family were prominent Canadians and British Loyalists. The pair married in June 1815 and had twelve children; ten survived and grew up in Eldon House. On 10 September 1834, Amelia Ryerse Harris, John Harris, and their then single son and seven daughters moved into Eldon House and occupied it thereafter for the next 125 years. Upon John's death, ownership of the house was passed to descendants: John Fitzjohn, Edward William, and George Becher Harris. Edward William was responsible for an addition to the house, added in 1877.

George Becher Harris, a partner in the Harris brothers law firm, married Mary Elizabeth Lucy Ronalds (known as Lucy), who was the only great-grandchild of both nurseryman Hugh Ronalds and fur trader William Robertson. John Askin was another of her great-grandfathers. Lucy and George raised their four children at Raleigh House, a few blocks north and in Eldon House, and in 1887 took over ownership of Eldon House from George's brother Edward. Lucy eventually inherited Robertson's fortune and the contents of the Ronalds family home in Brentford, England. Due to the influx of wealth, the family was able to take an extravagant world tour in 1897. Many of the family's heirlooms and souvenirs are still on display at Eldon House.

After George's death in 1923, his eldest son, George Henry Ronald Harris took over ownership of the home. Ronald was a graduate of the Royal Military College of Canada and worked as a mining engineer in Greenwood, British Columbia (1900–1); Quebec; Mossammides, Angola West, Africa (1901–03); East Africa Syndicates (1903–4); and Cassinga Concessions, Angola (1905–8). Many of his souvenirs, especially weaponry from Africa, are on display. Ronald Harris and his wife Lorna Gibbons lived in Eldon House with their three children: George, born in 1910; Amelia Lucy, born in 1913; and Ronald Sutton (Robin) born in 1919 and with Ronald's older sister, Amelia (Milly) Harris. After the death of George Henry Ronald Harris's sister in 1959, his children donated the house and gardens to the City of London.

An Ontario Historical Plaque was erected by the province to commemorate The Eldon House's role in Ontario's heritage.
