= List of baronetcies in the Baronetage of the United Kingdom: C =

Peerages and baronetcies of Britain and Ireland
Extant	All
Dukes	Dukedoms
Marquesses	Marquessates
Earls	Earldoms
Viscounts	Viscountcies
Barons	Baronies
Baronets	Baronetcies
En, Ire, NS, GB, UK (extinct)

This is a list of baronetcies in the Baronetage of the United Kingdom. They have been created since 1801 when they replaced the baronetages in the Baronetage of Great Britain, and Baronetage of Ireland. This list is not currently complete.

Title	Date of creation	Surname	Current status	Notes
Cahn of Stanford-upon-Soar	1934	Cahn	extant	
Cain of Wargrave	1920	Cain	extinct 1969	
Caine of Greeba Castle	1937	Caine	extinct 1971	
Caird of Belmont Castle	1913	Caird	extinct 1916	
Caird of Glenfarquhar	1928	Caird	extinct 1954	
Calthrop of Croxley House	1918	Calthrop	extinct 1919	
Calvert of Claydon House	1818	Calvert, Verney	extant	unproven (fifth Baronet died 2001 - under review
Cameron of Balclutha	1893	Cameron	extinct 1968	
Cameron of Fassiefern, Callart and Arthurstone	1817	Cameron	extinct 1863	
Campbell of Airds Bay and Bromley	1939	Campbell	extinct 1954	
Campbell of Ardnamurchan	1913	Campbell	dormant	second Baronet died 1943
Campbell of Barcaldine	1831	Campbell	extant	
Campbell of Blythswood	1880	Campbell	extinct 1908	first Baronet created Baron Blythswood in 1892, which title became extinct in 1940
Campbell of Carrick Buoy	1831	Campbell	extinct 1900	
Campbell of Dunstaffnage	1836	Campbell	extinct 1879	
Campbell of Gartsford	1815	Campbell, Cockburn-Campbell	extant	
Campbell of Gartsford	1821	Campbell, Cockburn-Campbell	extant	
Campbell of Inverneil	1818	Campbell	extinct 1819	
Campbell of Milltown	1917	Campbell	extinct 1984	first Baronet created Baron Glenavy in 1921
Campbell of New Brunswick	1831	Campbell	extinct 1949	
Campbell of St Cross Mede	1815	Campbell	extant	
Campbell of Succoth	1808	Campbell	extinct 2017	
Carbutt of Nanhurst	1892	Carbutt	extinct 1905	
Carden of Molesey	1887	Carden	dormant	fourth Baronet died 1993
Cargill of Glasgow	1920	Cargill	extinct 1954	
Carlile of Gayhurst	1928	Carilie	extinct 1950	
Carlile of Ponsbourne Park	1917	Carlile	extinct 1942	
Carmichael of Nutwood	1821	Carmichael	extinct 1902	
Cartier of Montreal	1868	Cartier	extinct 1873	
Cary of Withington	1955	Cary	extant	
Cassel of Bryanston Square	1920	Cassel	extant	
Catto of Cairncatto	1921	Catoo	extant	first Baronet created Baron Catto in 1936
Cautley of Horsted Keynes	1924	Cautley	extinct 1946	first Baronet created Baron Cautley in 1936
Cave of Cleve Hill, Sidbury Manor and Stoneleigh House	1896	Cave	extant	
Cawley of Prestwich	1906	Cawley	extant	first Baronet created Baron Cawley in 1918
Cayzer of Gartmore	1904	Cayzer	extant	
Cayzer of Roffey Park	1921	Cayzer	extinct 1999	second Baronet created a life peer as Baron Cayzer in 1982
Cayzer of Tylney	1924	Cayzer	extant	first Baronet created Baron Rotherwick in 1939
Chadwyck-Healey of Wyphurst	1919	Chadwyck-Healey	extant	
Chamberlain of London	1828	Chamberlain	extinct 1980	
Champion de Crespigny of Champion Lodge	1805	Champion de Crespigny	extinct 1952	
Champneys, later Dalrymple-Champneys of Littlemeads	1910	Champneys, Dalrymple–Champneys	extinct 1980	
Chance of the Grand Avenue	1900	Chance	extant	
Channing of Maiden Newton	1906	Channing	extinct 1926	first Baronet created Baron Channing of Wellingborough in 1912
Chapman of Cleadon	1958	Chapman	exant	
Charles of Waltham Abbey and Manchester Square	1928	Charles	extinct 1975	
Chatterton of Castle Mahon	1801	Chatterton	extinct 1874	
Chaytor of Croft	1831	Chaytor	dormant	seventh Baronet died 1976 - under review
Cheyne of Leagarth	1908	Cheyne	extant	
Chichester of Arlington Court	1840	Chichester	extinct 1881	
Chichester of Green Castle	1821	Chichester	extinct 1847	
Child of Bromley Place	1919	Child	extant	
Child of Newfield, Stallington and Dunlosset	1868	Child	extinct 1958	
Chisholm of Belhaven Terrace	1903	Chisholm	extinct 1923	Lord Provost of Glasgow
Chitty of the Temple	1924	Chitty	extant	
Cholmeley of Easton	1806	Cholmeley	extant	
Christison of Moray Place	1871	Christison	extinct 1993	
Chubb of Newlands	1900	Chubb	extant	first Baronet created Baron Hayter in 1927; baronetcy unproven as of 30 June 2006 (3rd baronet died 2003) - under review of the Registrar of the Baronetage
Chubb of Stonehenge	1919	Chubb	extinct 1957	
Church of Woodside, Belshill and Harley Street	1901	Church	extinct 1979	President of the Royal College of Physicians
Churchman of Ipswich	1917	Churchman	extinct 1949	first Baronet created Baron Woodbridge in 1932
Churchman of Melton	1938	Churchman	extinct 1947	
Chute of the Vyne	1952	Chute	extinct 1956	
Clark of Cavendish Square	1883	Clark	extinct 1979	
Clark of Dunlambert	1917	Clark	extant	
Clark of Melville Crescent	1886	Clark	extant	Lord Provost of Edinburgh
Clark of St George's	1837	Clark	extinct 1910	
Clarke of Crosses Green House	1804	Clarke, Clarke-Travers	extinct 1926	
Clarke of Dunham Lodge	1831	Clark	extant	
Clarke of Rupert's Wood	1882	Clarke	extant	unproven (third Baronet died 2005) - under review
Claughton of Dudley Priory	1912	Claughton	extinct 1921	
Clay of Fulwell Lodge	1841	Clay	extant	
Clayton-East of Hall Place	1838	Clayton-East, East, Clayton-East-Clayton	extinct 1932	
Clifford of Flaxbourne	1887	Clifford	extant	
Clifford of the Navy	1838	Clifford	extinct 1895	
Close of Mysore	1812	Close	extinct 1813	
Clouston of Montreal	1908	Clouston	extinct 1912	
Coates of Haypark	1921	Coates	extant	
Coates of Helperby Hall	1911	Coates, Milnes-Coates	extant	
Coats of Ballathie	1905	Coats	extant	
Cochrane of Woodbrook	1903	Cochrane	extant	
Cochrane of Woodbrook	1915	Cochrane	extinct 1949	
Coddington of Wycollar	1896	Coddington	extinct 1918	
Codrington of Dodington	1876	Codrington	extant	unproven (third Baronet died 2005) - under review
Coffin of the Magdalaine Islands	1804	Coffin	extinct 1839	
Cohen of Highfield	1905	Cohen	extinct 1968	
Colfox of Symondsbury	1939	Colfox	extant	
Collet of St Clere	1888	Collet	extinct 1944	
Collett of London	1934	Collett	extant	Lord Mayor of London
Collier of the Navy	1814	Collier	extinct 1824	
Colman of Gatton Park	1907	Colman	extant	
Colman of Reigate	1952	Colman	extinct 1966	
Conant of Lyndon	1954	Conant	extant	
Congreve of Congreve	1927	Congreve	extinct 1941	
Congreve of Walton	1812	Congreve	extinct 1881	
Conroy of Llanbrynmair	1837	Conroy	extinct 1900	
Clifford-Constable of Tixall	1815	Clifford-Constable	extinct 1894	
Cook of Doughty House	1886	Cook	extant	
Cooper of Berrydown Court	1920	Cooper	extinct 1922	Lord Mayor of London
Cooper of Hursley Park	1905	Cooper	extinct 1961	
Cooper of Shenstone Court	1905	Cooper	extant	
Cooper of Singleton	1941	Cooper	extinct 1941	
Cooper of Walcot	1828	Cooper	extinct 1828	
Cooper of Woollahra	1863	Cooper	extant	
Cope of Osbaston Hall	1918	Cope	extinct 1966	
Cope of St Mellons	1928	Cope	extinct 1946	first Baronet created Baron Cope in 1945
Corbet of Moreton Corbet and Linslede	1808	Corbet	extinct 1996	
Cornwall of Holcombe Burnell	1918	Cornwall	extinct 1962	
Corrigan of Cappagh, Inniscorrig and Marrion Square	1866	Corrigan	extinct 1883	
Corry of Dunraven	1885	Corry	dormant	fourth Baronet died 2000
Cory-Wright of Mackerye End	1903	Cory-Wright	extant	
Cory of Coryton	1919	Cory	extant	
Cory of Llantarnam Abbey	1907	Cory	extinct 1941	
Cotterell of Garnons	1805	Cotterell	extant	
Cotts of Coldharbour	1921	Cotts	extant	
Couper of the Army	1841	Couper	extant	
Courtauld of Penny Pot	1939	Courtauld	extinct 1940	
Courthope of Whiligh	1925	Courthope	extinct 1955	first Baronet created Baron Courthope in 1945
Cowan of Beeslack	1894	Cowan	extinct 1900	
Cowan of the Baltic	1921	Cowan	extinct 1956	
Cowell-Stepney of Llanelly	1871	Cowell-Stepney	extinct 1909	
Cox of Old Windsor	1921	Cox	extinct 1922	
Coxen of Seal	1941	Coxen	extinct 1946	Lord Mayor of London
Craig of Alsager	1927	Craig	extinct 1933	
Craig of Stormont	1918	Craig	extant	first Baronet created Viscount Craigavon in 1927
Craik of Kennoway	1926	Craik	extinct 1955	
Crampton of Merrion Square	1839	Crampton	extinct 1886	
Craven	1942	Craven	extinct 1946	
Crisp of Bungay	1913	Crisp	extant	
Critchett of Harley Street	1908	Critchet	extant	
Croft of Bournemouth	1924	Croft	extant	first Baronet created Baron Croft in 1940
Croft of Cowling Hall	1818	Croft	extant	
Crofton of Longford House	1838	Crofton	extant	
Crofton of Mohill Castle	1801	Crofton	dormant	seventh Baronet died 1987
Crompton of Wood End	1838	Crompton	extinct 1849	
Crosfield of Highgate	1915	Crosfield	extinct 1938	
Cross of Bolton-le-Moors	1941	Cross	extinct 1968	
Cross of Marchbankwood	1912	Cross	extinct 1963	
Crossley of Combermere Abbey	1909	Crossley	extant	unproven (fifth Baronet died 2003) - under review
Crossley of Halifax	1863	Crossley	extant	second Baronet created Baron Somerleyton in 1916
Cunard of Bush Hill	1859	Cubard	extinct 1989	
Cunliffe-Owen of Weir Bank	1920	Cunliffe-Owen	extant	
Cunningham of Crookedstone	1963	Cunningham	extinct 1976	
Cunningham of Hyndhope	1942	Cunningham	extinct 1963	first Baronet created Viscount Cunningham of Hyndhope in 1946
Curre of Itton Court	1928	Curre	extinct 1930	
Currie	1847	Currie	extant	
Curtis of Cullands Grove	1802	Curtis	extant	
Cust of Leasowe Castle	1876	Cust	extinct 1931	
Cuyler of St John Lodge	1814	Cuyler	extinct 1947	
