= William Rowley Elliston =

British judge and politician

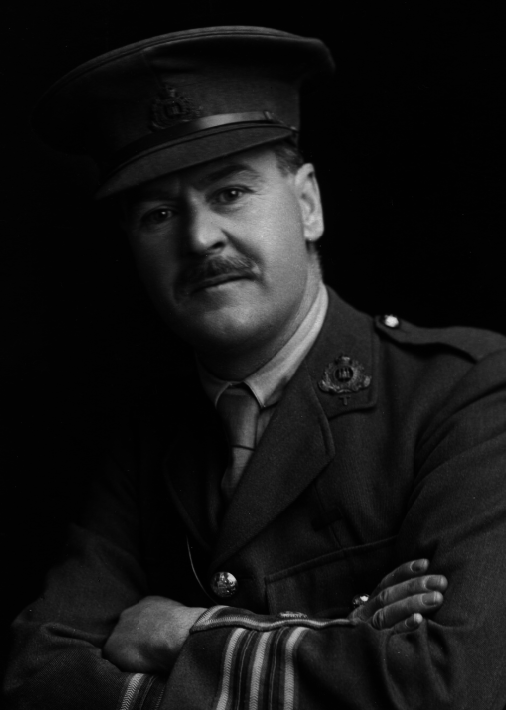
Lt Colonel William Rowley Elliston of 6th Battalion Suffolk Regiment, 1918

William Rowley Elliston OBE, (1 February 1869 – 12 February 1954), was a British judge and Liberal Party politician.

== Background ==
Elliston was born in Manor House, Ipswich, the eldest son of W.A. Elliston. He attended Ipswich School, where he was a Pemberton Scholar in 1885, and was elected simultaneously in 1887 to an Open Classical Demyship at Magdalen College, Oxford and an Open Classical Scholarship at Christ's College, Cambridge, choosing the latter. He graduated from Cambridge with first-class honours in the Classical Tripos in 1890 and a first-class LLB the following year.

In 1898 he married Ethel Mary Walton, niece of the newspaper proprietor and Liberal politician Sir Frederick Wilson. They had one son and two daughters. He was awarded the OBE in the 1951 Birthday Honours for public services in Suffolk.

== Political career ==
Elliston's first involvement in politics came in 1905 when he was elected to Ipswich Borough Council. He served on this body for the next 23 years. He was Liberal candidate for the Woodbridge division of Suffolk at the December 1910 General Election. The constituency was a Conservative marginal that the Liberals had last won in 1906. He was unable to re-gain the seat. He contested Woodbridge a further three times without success. In 1918, endorsement from the Coalition Government was given to his Unionist opponent, regardless he polled a credible 44.2%. Despite this good showing, he did not contest the 1920 Woodbridge by-election or the 1922 General Election. Following Liberal reunion, he contested the 1923 General Election. However, by now, the Labour Party were running candidates at Woodbridge. The Unionist was returned on a minority vote, while Elliston came second. At the 1924 General Election, he again came second. In 1927, he served as Mayor of Ipswich for a year. He was Liberal candidate for the Colchester division of Essex at the 1929 General Election. Colchester was a Unionist/Labour marginal seat offering little chance for a Liberal. He finished third. He did not stand for parliament again. In 1932, after a break from Ipswich Council, he was appointed as a Council Alderman, serving until 1938.

== Other Activities ==
Elliston was leader writer for the East Anglian Daily Times in 1900.

=== Electoral record ===
General Election December 1910: Woodbridge
Party	Candidate	Votes	%	±%
Conservative	Robert Francis Peel	5,704	52.6	
Liberal	William Rowley Elliston	5,144	47.4	
Majority			5.2	
Turnout				
Conservative hold		Swing		

General Election 1918: Woodbridge
Party	Candidate	Votes	%	±%
Unionist	Robert Francis Peel	8,654	55.8	
Liberal	William Rowley Elliston	6,842	44.2	
Majority		1,812	11.6	
Turnout			51.0	
Unionist hold		Swing		

General Election 1923: Woodbridge
Party	Candidate	Votes	%	±%
Unionist	Sir Arthur Charles Churchman	10,606	46.7	−10.0
Liberal	William Rowley Elliston	7,328	32.2	n/a
Labour	Edward John Cecil Neep	4,810	21.1	−22.2
Majority		3,278	14.5	+1.1
Turnout			70.9	+1.8
Unionist hold		Swing	n/a	

General Election 1924: Woodbridge
Party	Candidate	Votes	%	±%
Unionist	Sir Arthur Charles Churchman	13,419	54.9	+8.2
Liberal	William Rowley Elliston	7,008	28.7	−3.5
Labour	Sylvain Mayer	3,998	16.4	−4.7
Majority		6,411	26.2	+11.7
Turnout			74.3	+3.4
Unionist hold		Swing	+5.8	
