= Alexander Cross (disambiguation) =

Alexander Cross was a Scottish politician.

Alexander Cross may also refer to:

- Alexander Cross (Canadian judge) of the Quebec Court of Queen's Bench, 1877–1892, Cushing v. Dupuy
- Sir Alexander Cross, 3rd Baronet (1880–1963), of the Cross baronets
- Alex Cross, fictional character
- Alexander Cross (1903–1976), actor from Wales, UK, starring in the 1937 film Texas Trail

== See also ==
- Cross (surname)
