= Robert Everett =

Robert Everett may refer to:

- Fats Everett (Robert Ashton Everett, 1915–1969), U.S. representative from Tennessee
- Robert Everett (computer scientist) (1921–2018), American computer scientist
- Robert W. H. Everett (1901–1942), British World War 2 naval pilot and Grand National winner
- Robert W. Everett (1839–1915), U.S. representative from Georgia
- Robert Lacey Everett (1833–1916), English farmer and Liberal politician
- Terry Everett (Robert Terry Everett, 1937–2024), U.S. representative from Alabama
- Robert Everett (minister) (1791–1875), leader of the Welsh-speaking abolitionist movement
