= 1920 Woodbridge by-election =

UK parliamentary by-election

← 1918	28 July 1920	1922 →

Candidate	Churchman	Harben
Party	Unionist	Labour
Popular vote	9,898	8,707
Percentage	53.2%	46.8%
MP before election
Peel
Unionist
Subsequent MP
Churchman
Unionist

The 1920 Woodbridge by-election was held on 28 July 1920. The by-election was held due to the resignation of the incumbent Coalition Unionist MP, Robert Francis Peel. It was won by the Coalition Unionist candidate Sir Arthur Churchman.

== Vacancy ==
The by-election was caused by the sitting Unionist MP, Robert Francis Peel resigning his seat to become Governor and Commander-in-Chief of St Helena. He had been MP here since re-gaining the seat from the Liberals in January 1910.

== Electoral history ==
The constituency was a Unionist/Liberal marginal. Since the seat's creation in 1885, it had been won by a Unionist candidate six times and by a Liberal three times. The Coalition Government 'Coupon' at the last General Election in 1918 was awarded to the sitting Unionist rather than the Liberal challenger. Despite this, the Liberal vote held up very well;

Robert Peel

General election 1918: Woodbridge
Party		Candidate	Votes	%	±%
C	Unionist	Robert Francis Peel	8,654	55.8	+3.2
	Liberal	William Rowley Elliston	6,842	44.2	−3.2
Majority			1,812	11.6	+6.4
Turnout			15,496	51.0	−33.7
	Unionist hold		Swing	+3.2	
C indicates candidate endorsed by the coalition government.

== Candidates ==
- The Unionists selected 53-year-old tobacco manufacturer Sir Arthur Churchman as their candidate to defend the seat.
- The Liberal candidate from the last election, Rowley Elliston did not stand this time, despite his good showing in 1918. In fact, no Liberal candidate came forward.
- The Labour Party, who had not contested the seat before, selected 46-year-old H.D. Harben, a former Liberal candidate, as their candidate to challenge for the seat. He had contested the 1906 general election at Worcester coming second. He then contested the dual member seat of Portsmouth at the December 1910 general election, coming fourth.

== Campaign ==
Polling Day was set for 28 July 1920. Nominations closed to confirm that the election would be a two-way contest. Churchman received the official endorsement of the Coalition Government.

== Result ==
Woodbridge by-election, 1920
Party		Candidate	Votes	%	±%
C	Unionist	Arthur Churchman	9,898	53.2	−2.6
	Labour	Henry Devenish Harben	8,707	46.8	New
Majority			1,191	6.4	−5.2
Turnout			18,605	61.4	+10.4
	Unionist hold		Swing		
C indicates candidate endorsed by the coalition government.

== Aftermath ==
The result at the following General Election in 1922 was;

General election 1922: Woodbridge
Party	Candidate	Votes	%	±%
Unionist	Arthur Churchman	12,396	56.7	+3.5
Labour	Edward Neep	9,476	43.3	−3.5
Majority		2,920	13.4	+7.0
Turnout		21,872	69.1	+7.7
Unionist hold		Swing	+3.4	

== See also ==
- List of United Kingdom by-elections
