= Lord Stevenson =

Lord Stevenson may refer to:

- James Stevenson, 1st Baron Stevenson (1873–1926), British businessman and civil servant
- James Stevenson, Lord Stevenson, British judge
- Dennis Stevenson, Baron Stevenson of Coddenham (born 1945), British businessman
- Wilf Stevenson, Baron Stevenson of Balmacara (born 1947), British Labour life peer and former adviser
