= Listed buildings in Hintlesham =

Civil Parish in Suffolk, England

Hintlesham is a village and civil parish in the Babergh District of Suffolk, England. It contains 17 listed buildings that are recorded in the National Heritage List for England. Of these one is grade I, one is grade II* and 15 are grade II.

This list is based on the information retrieved online from Historic England.

== Key ==
Grade	Criteria
I	Buildings that are of exceptional interest
II*	Particularly important buildings of more than special interest
II	Buildings that are of special interest

== Listing ==
Name	Grade	Location	Type	Completed (Note: The date given is the date used by Historic England as significant for the initial building or that of an important part in the structure's description.)	Date designated	Grid ref. (Note: The grid reference is based on the British national grid reference system, sometimes known as OSGB36, used by the Ordnance Survey.) Geo-coordinates	Notes	Entry number (Note: The "List Entry Number" is a unique number assigned to each listed building and scheduled monument by Historic England.)	Image	Wikidata
Mill Farm Cottage	II				29 January 1988	TM0891944422; 52°03′32″N 1°02′46″E		1036954	Upload Photo	Q26288629
Manor Farmhouse	II	Duke Street			29 January 1988	TM0780342350; 52°02′26″N 1°01′43″E		1036912	Upload Photo	Q26288588
Wood Farmhouse	II	Duke Street			29 January 1988	TM0730342235; 52°02′23″N 1°01′16″E		1036913	Upload Photo	Q26288589
Gatepiers, Gates and Railings to Hintlesham Hall	II	Gates And Railings To Hintlesham Hall, Hadleigh Road			29 January 1988	TM0840643506; 52°03′03″N 1°02′17″E		1036916	Upload Photo	Q26288592
Hintlesham War Memorial	II	George Street, IP8 3NH			30 January 2020	TM0875443442; 52°03′00″N 1°02′35″E		1464995	Upload Photo	Q97451521
Church of St Nicholas	II	Hadleigh Road	church building		22 February 1955	TM0874743480; 52°03′01″N 1°02′35″E		1351644	Church of St Nicholas More images	Q26634727
College Farmhouse	II	Hadleigh Road			22 February 1955	TM0749043600; 52°03′07″N 1°01′29″E		1036919	Upload Photo	Q26288593
Hintlesham Hall	I	Hadleigh Road	house		22 February 1955	TM0831743823; 52°03′13″N 1°02′13″E		1036917	Hintlesham Hall More images	Q17541804
Hintlesham Hall Lodge	II	Hadleigh Road			22 February 1955	TM0842443516; 52°03′03″N 1°02′18″E		1351645	Upload Photo	Q26634728
Hyntle Place	II	Hadleigh Road			22 February 1955	TM0934743522; 52°03′02″N 1°03′06″E		1351643	Upload Photo	Q26634726
Normans Farmhouse	II	Hadleigh Road			29 January 1988	TM0702144040; 52°03′22″N 1°01′05″E		1286010	Upload Photo	Q26574653
Old Hall House	II	Hadleigh Road			22 February 1955	TM0648843782; 52°03′14″N 1°00′37″E		1036920	Upload Photo	Q26288594
Old Post Office	II	Hadleigh Road			29 January 1988	TM0892743396; 52°02′58″N 1°02′44″E		1036914	Upload Photo	Q26288590
Park Farmhouse	II	Hadleigh Road			29 January 1988	TM0766344144; 52°03′24″N 1°01′39″E		1193784	Upload Photo	Q26488429
Rose Cottage	II	Hadleigh Road			29 January 1988	TM0865243506; 52°03′02″N 1°02′30″E		1036915	Upload Photo	Q26288591
Hintlesham Priory	II	Priory Road			29 January 1988	TM0723845223; 52°04′00″N 1°01′19″E		1193814	Upload Photo	Q26488458
Service Ranges, Stables, Former Coach House and Brewhouse Attached to Hintlesham Hall	II*	Stables, Former Coach House And Brewhouse Attached To Hintlesham Hall, Hadleigh Road			22 February 1955	TM0828243846; 52°03′14″N 1°02′11″E		1036918	Upload Photo	Q17533190

== See also ==
- Grade I listed buildings in Suffolk
- Grade II* listed buildings in Suffolk

== Sources ==
- Bettely, James; Pevsner, Nikolaus (2015) [1961], Suffolk: West, The Buildings of England, New Haven and London: Yale University Press, ISBN 978-0-300-19655-9
