= Glasgow Camlachie =

Parliamentary constituency in the United Kingdom, 1885–1955

- Former burgh constituency for the House of Commons
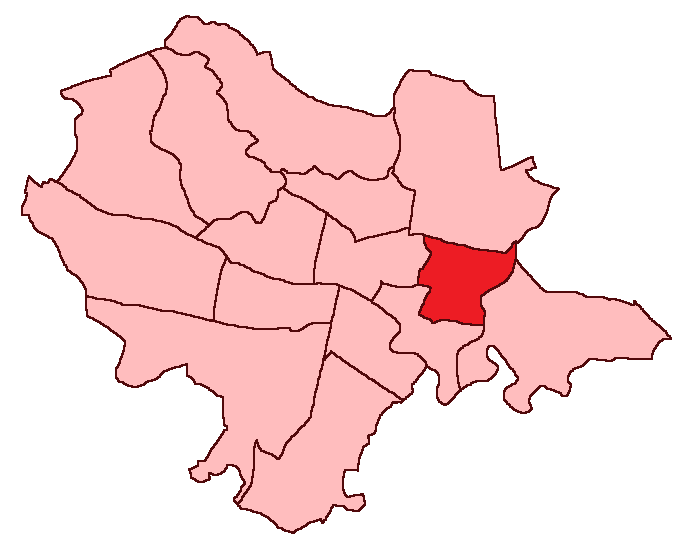
- Glasgow Camlachie in Glasgow 1918–1949
- Subdivision: County of the city of Glasgow

1885–1955
- Seats: One
- Created from: Glasgow
- Replaced by: Glasgow Provan and Glasgow Bridgeton

Glasgow Camlachie was a burgh constituency represented in the House of Commons of the Parliament of the United Kingdom from 1885 until 1955.

It elected one Member of Parliament (MP) using the first-past-the-post voting system.

== Boundaries ==
Glasgow Camlachie in Lanarkshire, 1950–1955

The Redistribution of Seats Act 1885 provided that the constituency was to consist of the second Municipal Ward, and so much of the third Municipal Ward as lies south of a line drawn along the centre of Duke Street.

In 1918 the constituency consisted of

That portion of the city which is bounded by a line commencing at a point on the municipal boundary on the south-east side of Cumbernauld Road where that road is intersected by the east side of the Caledonian Railway (Glasgow Lines), thence southward along the municipal boundary to a point about 299 yards north-westward from the centre of Carntyne Road, where the municipal boundary intersects that road, thence north-westward to a point on the centre line of the said railway 380 yards south of the centre line of Cumbernauld Road, thence southwestward and southward along the centre line of the said railway to the centre line of London Road, thence westward along the centre line of London Road and Canning Street to the centre line of Abercromby Street, thence north-eastward along the centre line of Abercromby Street to the centre line of Gallowgate, thence westward along the centre line of Gallowgate to the centre line of Sydney Street, thence northward along the centre line of Sydney Street to the centre line of Duke Street, thence eastward along the centre line of Duke Street to the centre line of Ark Lane, thence northward along the centre line of Ark Lane and Firpark Street to the centre line of Alexandra Parade, thence eastward and north-eastward along the centre line of Alexandra Parade, and Cumbernauld Road to the east side of the Caledonian Railway (Glasgow Lines), thence southward to the point of commencement.

The Representation of the People Act 1948 provided that the constituency was to consist of

The following wards (as constituted by the Local Government (Scotland) (Glasgow Wards and Councillors) Order, 1948, S.I., 1948, No. 876) of the county of the city of Glasgow, namely, Dennistoun, Provan and that part of Mile-End ward which lies to the west of a line commencing at a point on the northern boundary of the ward immediately opposite the centre line of Millerston Street thence southward to and along the centre line of Millerston Street to the centre line of Gallowgate; thence eastward along the centre line of Gallowgate to a point opposite the centre line of Fielden Street; thence southward along the centre line of Fielden Street to the termination of the line on the southern boundary of the Mile-End ward immediately opposite the centre of Fielden Street.

The Parliamentary Constituencies (Scotland) (Glasgow Bridgeton, Glasgow Provan and Glasgow Shettleston) Order, 1955 provided for most of the area of the Camlachie constituency to be transferred to the new Glasgow Provan constituency, except for part of the Mile-End ward which was transferred to Glasgow Bridgeton.

== Members of Parliament ==
Year	Member	Party
1885	Hugh Watt	Liberal
1892	Alexander Cross	Liberal Unionist
1908	Alexander Cross	Liberal
1910	Halford Mackinder	Liberal Unionist
1912	Halford Mackinder	Unionist
1922	Campbell Stephen	Labour
1931	James Stevenson	Unionist
1935	Campbell Stephen	ILP
1947	Campbell Stephen	Labour
1948	Charles McFarlane	Unionist
1950	William Reid	Labour
1955	constituency abolished	

== Election results ==
=== Elections in the 1880s ===
General election 1885: Glasgow Camlachie
Party	Candidate	Votes	%	±%
Liberal	Hugh Watt	4,047	56.9	
Conservative	Thomas Arnold Reid	2,883	40.6	
Independent Liberal	James Martin	177	2.5	
Majority		1,164	16.3	
Turnout		7,107	77.1	
Registered electors		9,220		
Liberal win (new seat)				

Burleigh

General election 1886: Glasgow Camlachie
Party	Candidate	Votes	%	±%
Liberal	Hugh Watt	3,467	51.2	−5.7
Liberal Unionist	Bennet Burleigh	3,308	48.8	+8.2
Majority		159	2.4	−13.9
Turnout		6,775	73.5	−3.6
Registered electors		9,220		
Liberal hold		Swing	-7.0	

=== Elections in the 1890s ===
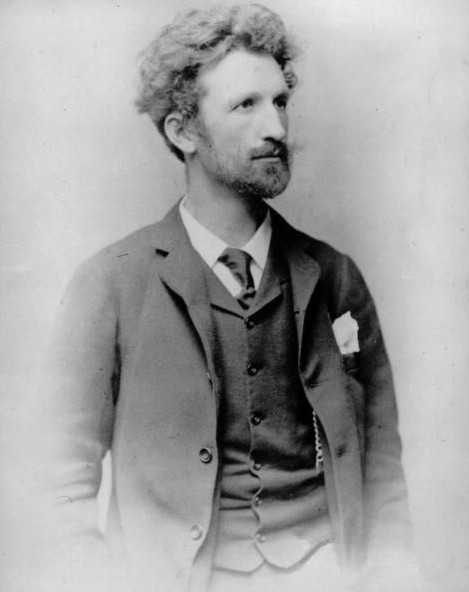
Graham

General election 1892: Glasgow Camlachie
Party	Candidate	Votes	%	±%
Liberal Unionist	Alexander Cross	3,455	45.3	−3.5
Liberal	John McCulloch	3,084	40.5	−10.7
Scottish Labour	Robert Cunninghame-Graham	906	11.9	New
Independent Liberal	Hugh Watt	179	2.3	New
Majority		371	4.8	N/A
Turnout		7,624	78.5	+5.0
Registered electors		9,716		
Liberal Unionist gain from Liberal		Swing	+3.6	

- The local Liberal association replaced Watt with Graham, due to the former's opposition to Irish Home Rule, Scottish church disestablishment and the temperance movement. They then replaced Graham with McCulloch, due to the former's attacks on Liberal policy and leadership.

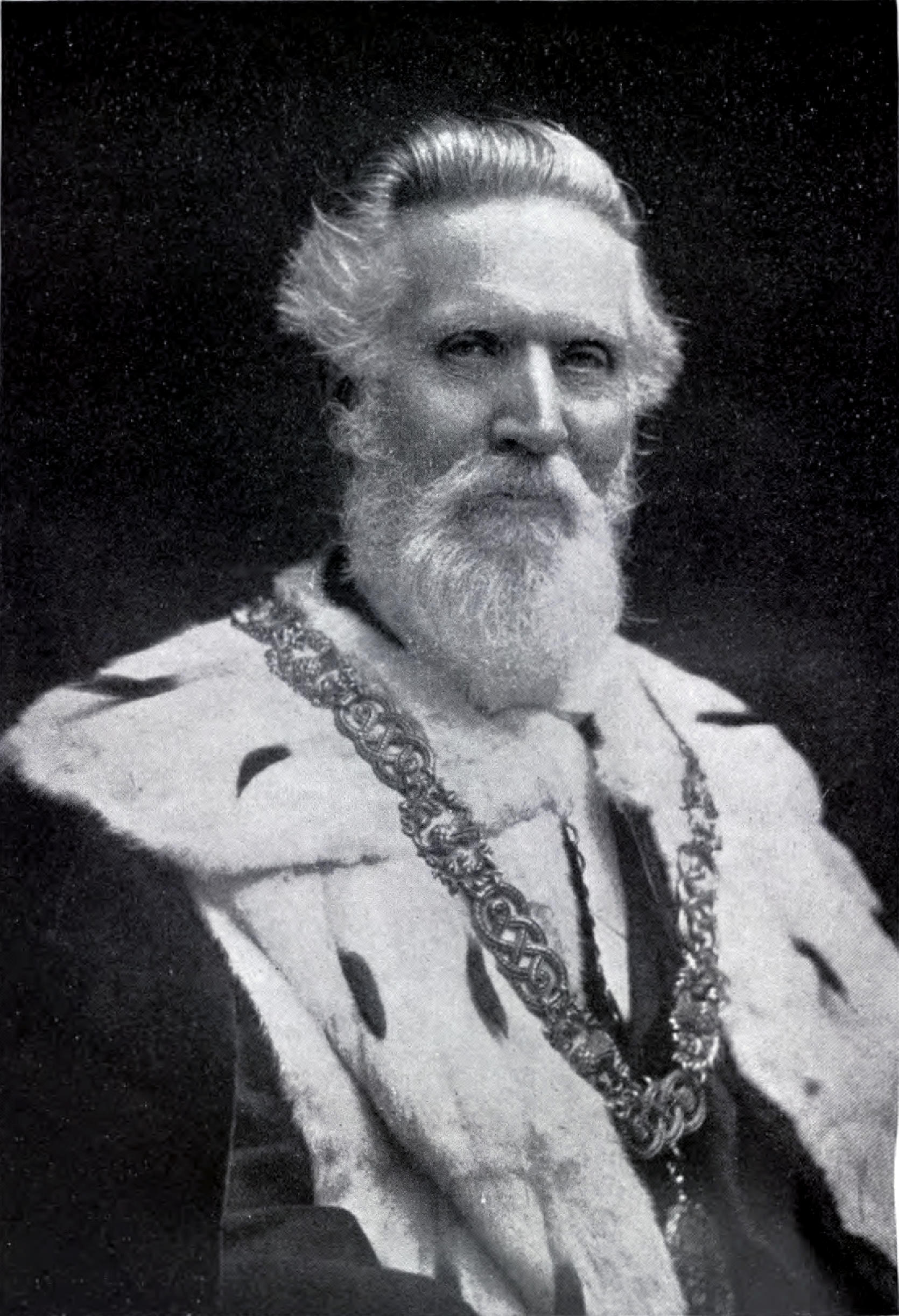
Chisholm

General election 1895: Glasgow Camlachie
Party	Candidate	Votes	%	±%
Liberal Unionist	Alexander Cross	3,198	50.0	+4.7
Liberal	Samuel Chisholm	2,497	39.1	−1.4
Ind. Labour Party	Robert Smillie	696	10.9	−1.0
Majority		701	10.9	+6.1
Turnout		6,391	63.6	−14.9
Registered electors		10,046		
Liberal Unionist hold		Swing	+3.0	

=== Elections in the 1900s ===
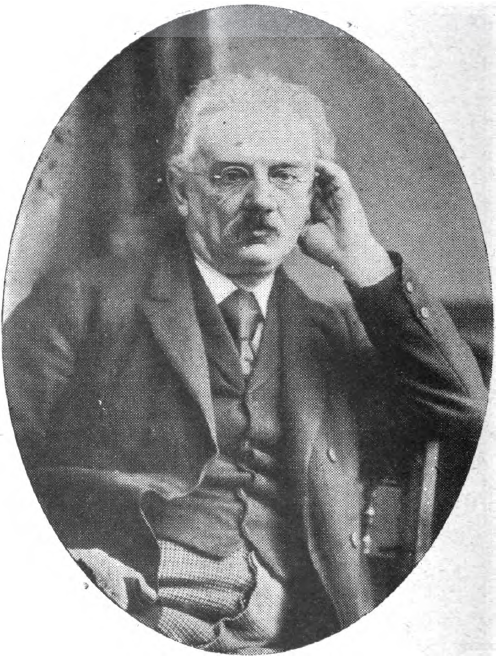
Fletcher

General election 1900: Glasgow Camlachie
Party	Candidate	Votes	%	±%
Liberal Unionist	Alexander Cross	4,345	58.3	+8.3
Scottish Workers	Alfred Fletcher	3,107	41.7	+30.8
Majority		1,238	16.6	+5.7
Turnout		7,452	71.1	+7.5
Registered electors		10,479		
Liberal Unionist hold		Swing		

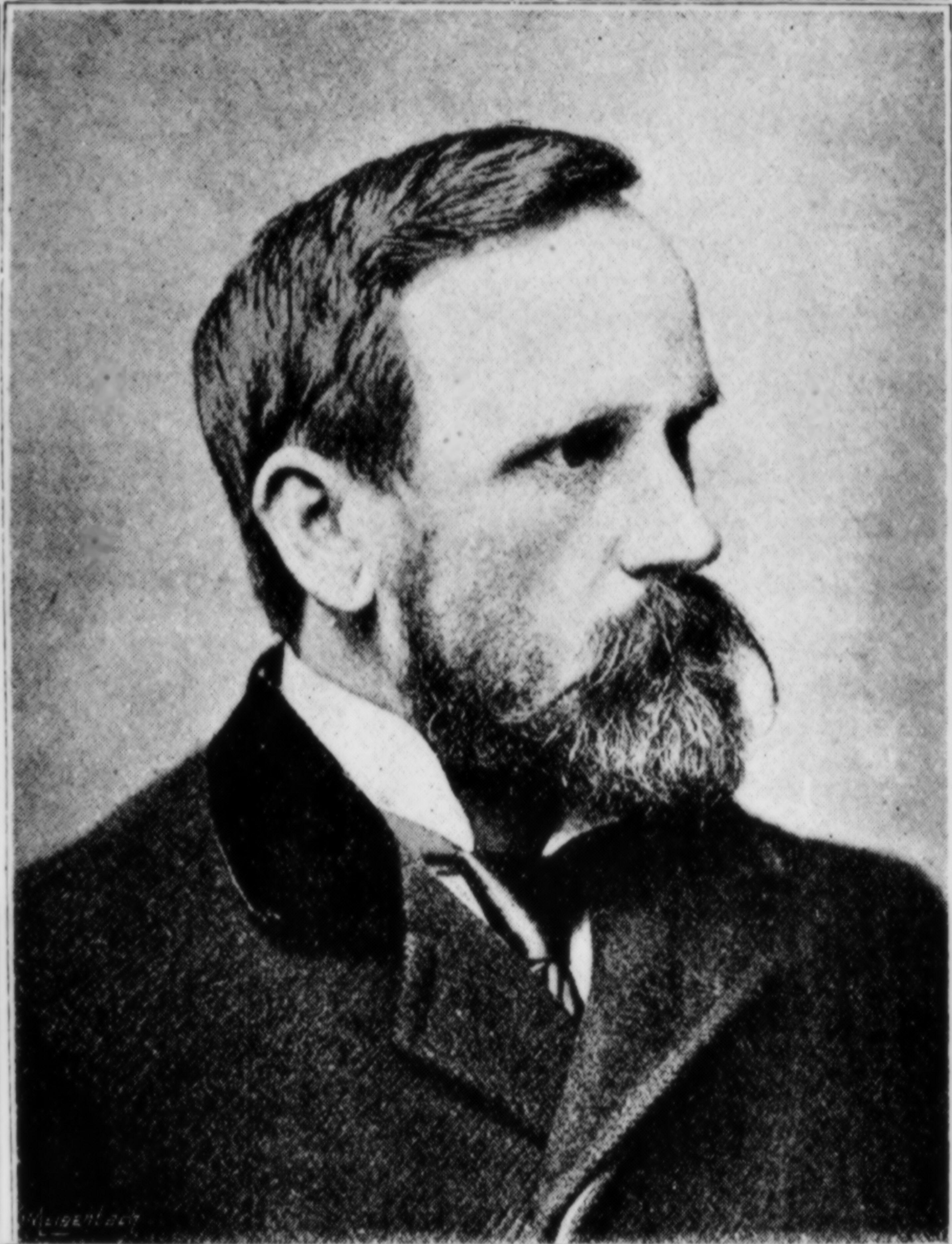
Burgess

General election 1906: Glasgow Camlachie
Party	Candidate	Votes	%	±%
Liberal Unionist	Alexander Cross	3,119	36.5	−21.8
Liberal	William Pringle	2,871	33.5	New
Labour Repr. Cmte.	Joseph Burgess	2,568	30.0	−11.7
Majority		248	3.0	−13.6
Turnout		8,558	84.1	+13.0
Registered electors		10,174		
Liberal Unionist hold		Swing		

=== Elections in the 1910s ===
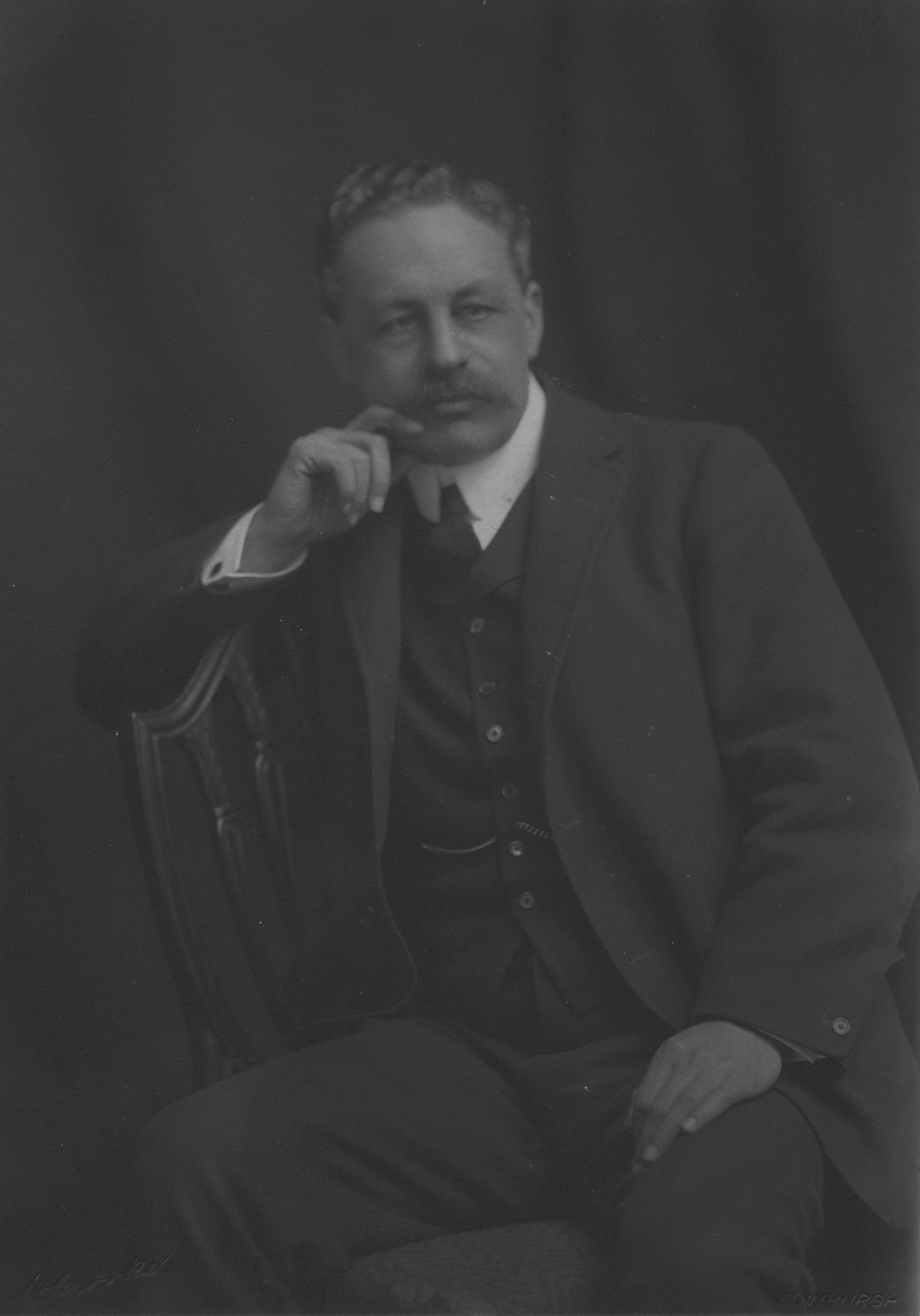
Mackinder

General election January 1910: Glasgow Camlachie
Party	Candidate	Votes	%	±%
Liberal Unionist	Halford Mackinder	3,227	38.1	+1.6
Liberal	Alexander Cross	2,793	33.0	−3.5
Labour	James Kessack	2,443	28.9	−1.1
Majority		434	5.1	+2.1
Turnout		8,463	87.6	+3.5
Liberal Unionist hold		Swing	+1.0	

Hogge

General election December 1910: Glasgow Camlachie
Party	Candidate	Votes	%	±%
Liberal Unionist	Halford Mackinder	3,479	40.9	+2.8
Liberal	James Myles Hogge	3,453	40.6	+7.6
Labour	James Kessack	1,539	18.1	−10.8
Women's Suffrage	William Julius Mirrlees	35	0.4	New
Majority		26	0.3	−4.8
Turnout		8,506	86.6	−1.0
Liberal Unionist hold		Swing	-2.4	

Mirrlees was the candidate of the Scottish Federation of Women's Suffrage Societies. His candidacy had the effect of ensuring the election of Mackinder, who opposed women's suffrage at the expense of Hogge, who supported it.

General Election 1914–15:

Another General Election was required to take place before the end of 1915. The political parties had been making preparations for an election to take place and by July 1914, the following candidates had been selected;

- Unionist: Halford Mackinder
- Liberal: Robert Shanks
- Labour: James Alston

General election 1918: Glasgow Camlachie
Party		Candidate	Votes	%	±%
C	Unionist	Halford Mackinder	13,645	62.9	+22.0
	Labour	Hugh Guthrie	7,192	33.1	+15.0
	Liberal	Daniel Browning	860	4.0	−36.6
Majority			6,453	29.8	+29.5
Turnout			21,697	58.1	−28.5
Registered electors			37,319		
	Unionist hold		Swing	+3.5	
C indicates candidate endorsed by the coalition government.

=== Elections in the 1920s ===
General election 1922: Glasgow Camlachie
Party	Candidate	Votes	%	±%
Labour	Campbell Stephen	15,181	53.2	+20.1
Unionist	Halford Mackinder	11,439	40.2	−22.7
Liberal	Walter Crawford Smith	1,896	6.6	+2.6
Majority		3,742	13.0	N/A
Turnout		28,516	81.0	+22.9
Registered electors		35,249		
Labour gain from Unionist		Swing	+21.4	

General election 1923: Glasgow Camlachie
Party	Candidate	Votes	%	±%
Labour	Campbell Stephen	14,143	56.2	+3.0
Unionist	Henry Keith	11,027	43.8	+3.6
Majority		3,116	12.4	−0.6
Turnout		25,170	71.8	−9.2
Registered electors		35,046		
Labour hold		Swing	−0.3	

General election 1924: Glasgow Camlachie
Party	Candidate	Votes	%	±%
Labour	Campbell Stephen	14,588	50.4	−5.8
Unionist	Peter Denniston Ridge-Beedle	14,373	49.6	+5.8
Majority		215	0.8	−11.6
Turnout		28,961	80.6	+8.8
Registered electors		35,918		
Labour hold		Swing	−5.8	

General election 1929: Glasgow Camlachie
Party	Candidate	Votes	%	±%
Labour	Campbell Stephen	17,946	53.1	+2.7
Unionist	James Stevenson	14,161	42.0	−7.6
National (Scotland)	John MacCormick	1,646	4.9	New
Majority		3,785	11.1	+10.3
Turnout		33,752	78.6	−2.0
Registered electors		42,960		
Labour hold		Swing	+5.2	

=== Elections in the 1930s ===
General election 1931: Glasgow Camlachie
Party	Candidate	Votes	%	±%
Unionist	James Stevenson	18,461	54.71	
Ind. Labour Party	Campbell Stephen	15,282	45.29	
Majority		3,179	9.42	N/A
Turnout		33,743	78.22	
Unionist gain from Labour		Swing		

General election 1935: Glasgow Camlachie
Party	Candidate	Votes	%	±%
Ind. Labour Party	Campbell Stephen	15,070	47.1	+1.8
Unionist	James Stevenson	14,186	44.3	−10.4
Labour	William Reid	2,732	8.6	N/A
Majority		884	2.8	N/A
Turnout		31,988		
Ind. Labour Party gain from Unionist		Swing		

=== Elections in the 1940s ===
General election 1945: Glasgow Camlachie
Party	Candidate	Votes	%	±%
Ind. Labour Party	Campbell Stephen	15,558	57.7	+10.6
Unionist	Charles McFarlane	11,399	42.3	−2.0
Majority		4,159	15.4	+12.6
Turnout		26,957	65.1	
Ind. Labour Party hold		Swing		

1948 Glasgow Camlachie by-election
Party	Candidate	Votes	%	±%
Unionist	Charles McFarlane	11,085	43.7	+1.4
Labour	John M. Inglis	10,690	42.1	N/A
Ind. Labour Party	Annie Maxton	1,622	6.4	−51.3
SNP	Robert Blair Wilkie	1,320	5.2	New
United Socialist Movement	Guy Aldred	345	1.4	New
Liberal	Edward Rogers Goodfellow	312	1.2	New
Majority		395	1.6	N/A
Turnout		25,374	56.8	−8.3
Unionist gain from Ind. Labour Party		Swing	+26.4	

=== Elections in the 1950s ===
General election 1950: Glasgow Camlachie
Party	Candidate	Votes	%	±%
Labour	William Reid	21,013	51.5	N/A
Unionist	Charles McFarlane	19,766	48.5	+6.2
Majority		1,247	3.0	N/A
Turnout		40,779	80.7	+15.6
Labour gain from Ind. Labour Party		Swing		

General election 1951: Glasgow Camlachie
Party	Candidate	Votes	%	±%
Labour	William Reid	20,994	51.3	−0.2
Unionist	Charles McFarlane	19,969	48.8	+0.3
Majority		1,025	2.5	−0.5
Turnout		40,963	82.4	+1.7
Labour hold		Swing		
