= William Churchman =

English tobacco manufacturer and public servant

Colonel Sir William Churchman Bt VD JP DL
- Born: William Alfred Churchman; 23 August 1863; Ipswich, Suffolk, England
- Died: 25 November 1947 (aged 84)
- Occupations: Tobacco manufacturer, public servant

Colonel Sir William Alfred Churchman, 1st Baronet, VD, JP, DL (23 August 1863 – 25 November 1947) was an English tobacco manufacturer and public servant.

Churchman was born in Ipswich, Suffolk. He went into partnership with his brother, Arthur, in the family tobacco firm which had been founded by their great-grandfather in 1790. This was renamed W. A. & A. C. Churchman. It was later absorbed by the tobacco combines and Churchman became a director of the Imperial Tobacco Company.

Churchman was a staunch Conservative and was elected mayor of Ipswich in 1901. In 1911, he became a justice of the peace for Suffolk.

Churchman was commissioned lieutenant in the 1st Suffolk Rifle Volunteers (later 1st Volunteer Battalion, Suffolk Regiment) in 1885, and promoted captain in 1890 and major in 1899. In 1905 he was granted the honorary rank of lieutenant-colonel, in 1906 he was promoted substantive lieutenant-colonel, and later that year he was granted the honorary rank of colonel. In 1908 he took command of the 4th Battalion, Suffolk Regiment in the new Territorial Force. He retired in 1912, but returned to command the battalion's recruiting section at the outbreak of the First World War. He was later appointed director of the Nitrate Section of the Ministry of Munitions. For these services he was knighted in the 1920 New Year Honours, having the honour conferred on 25 June 1920. He was created a Baronet of Melton, in the County of Suffolk on 29 June 1938, which became extinct upon his death.

== Footnotes ==
Baronetage of the United Kingdom
| New creation | Baronet (of Melton); 1938–1947 | Extinct |
