= Walter Ross Taylor (1838–1907) =

Scottish minister

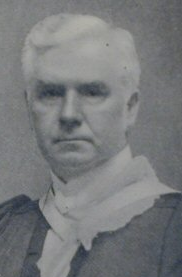
Walter Ross Taylor (1838-1907) photographed in 1900

Walter Ross Taylor (1838–1907) was a Scottish minister of the Free Church of Scotland who served as Moderator of the General Assembly in the critical year of Union in 1900. From 1900 he led the United Free Church of Scotland with its Moderator Rev Robert Rainy.

== Life ==
He was born on 11 April 1838 in the manse at Thurso, the son of Rev Walter Ross Taylor and his wife, Isabella Murray.

He was educated at Thurso Free Church School. In the Disruption of 1843 his father left the Church of Scotland to join the Free Church, and they had to vacate the manse as a result. He went to Edinburgh University where he received the medal in Moral Philosophy and won the Stratton Scholarship for best third year student. He then trained as a Free church minister at New College, Edinburgh from 1857 to 1861.

He was ordained at the Free Church of East Kilbride in 1862 replacing Rev Oswald Dykes. The church was often referred to as the West Mains Church. He left East Kilbride in 1868 and was translated to Kelvinside Free Church on Great Western Road in Glasgow. In 1891 he received an honorary doctorate (DD) from Glasgow University.

From 1890 to 1900 he was Convenor of the Sustentation Fund, pressing for a minimum stipend of 200 shillings per year for all ministers. As a strong organiser in May 1900 he was elected Moderator of the General Assembly with the principal duty of merging the Free Church with the United Presbyterian Church of Scotland. The critical Synod took place on 20 October 1900, creating the United Free Church of Scotland. However, not all ministers and congregations of the Free Church joined the Union.

Taylor remained in the same role and same building, thereafter becoming the United Free (UF) Church of Kelvinside.

In the following years he served as Chairman and Vice President of the National Bible Society.

He died at home, 1 Marchmont Terrace on 6 December 1907 following a protracted illness. He was buried in the Glasgow Necropolis on 9 December.

== Family ==
In 1876 he married Margaret I. Paterson, daughter of Dr Joshua Paterson. They had three sons and two daughters, including Walter Ross-Taylor MP.
