= Walter Ross-Taylor =

Scottish Conservative Party politician and civil servant

Walter Ross-Taylor CBE MP (7 July 1877 – 12 July 1958) was a Scottish Conservative Party politician and civil servant.

== Life ==
He was born in the manse at Thurso the son of the Rev Walter Ross Taylor (1838–1907), a prominent Free Church of Scotland minister and in turn son of the Very Rev Dr Walter Ross Taylor who served as Moderator of the General Assembly in 1884, and his first wife, Margaret Paterson. He was educated at Leys School in Cambridge, and at the Universities of Glasgow and Edinburgh, where he studied law. He was called to the Scottish bar in 1902.

He entered the Egyptian civil service in 1905 and held several judicial and administrative positions. He served as counsel to the Sultan and adviser to the Ministries of Public Works, War, and Agriculture.

During the later years of the First World War, he was chairman of the Supplies Control Board, Egypt. He was appointed a Commander of the Order of the British Empire in the 1919 New Year Honours for his services during the war. He was also awarded the Order of the Nile, Egypt's highest state honor.

Following his retirement from the civil service in 1923, he returned to the UK and sought public office. He was the member of parliament (MP) for Woodbridge from 1931 to 1945.

== Family ==
In 1910, he married Frances Orr. They had two sons.

Parliament of the United Kingdom
Preceded by Clavering Fison	Member of Parliament for Woodbridge; 1931 – 1945	Succeeded by Hon. John Hare
