= Campbell Stephen =

Scottish socialist politician

Reverend Campbell Stephen
- Born: 1884
- Died: 25 October 1947 (aged 62–63)
- Education: Glasgow University
- Occupations: minister, barrister, socialist politician
- Years active: MP (1922–1931,1935-1947)
- Political party: Independent Labour Party
- Spouse: Dorothy Jewson

Reverend Campbell Stephen (1884 – 25 October 1947) was a Scottish socialist politician.

A native of Glasgow, he was educated at Townhead Public School, Allan Glen's School and Glasgow University.

He worked first as United Free Church Minister and then as a barrister. He resigned his charge at the United Free Church in Ardrossan, Ayrshire in 1918 to contest Ayr Burghs in the same year.

He was Independent Labour Party Member of Parliament (MP) for Glasgow Camlachie from November 1922 to 1931 and from 1935 until his death.

He was one of James Maxton's closest political allies within the Independent Labour Party and supported Maxton both in his attempts to foster closer relations with the Communist Party and also during the disaffiliation debate in the early 1930s. Despite his strong support for ILP independence from the Labour Party when Maxton was alive, Stephen resigned the ILP whip to sit as an Independent from July 1947, and rejoined the Labour Party in October, shortly before his death. His death sparked the 1948 Glasgow Camlachie by-election.

In 1945, he married Dorothy Jewson, a former Labour Member of Parliament for Norwich.

Parliament of the United Kingdom
Preceded by Halford John Mackinder	Member of Parliament for Glasgow Camlachie; 1922–1931	Succeeded by James Stevenson
Preceded by James Stevenson	Member of Parliament for Glasgow Camlachie; 1935–1947	Succeeded by Charles Stuart McFarlane
