= Hugh Watt (British politician) =

Scottish merchant & Liberal politician (1848-1921)

Hugh Watt (1848 – 16 March 1921) was a Scottish merchant and Liberal politician who sat in the House of Commons from 1885 to 1892. His career ended in scandal and imprisonment.

== Early life ==
Watt was the only son of John Watt, Sheriff of Ayrshire and his wife Jane Baird. He was educated at Kilmarnock Academy and at the University of Geneva. He was a merchant in London, Liverpool, and Glasgow and chairman of Maxim-Weston Electric Co. and the New Chile Mining Co. He was the author of "Lectures on Practical Electricity."

== Political career ==
At the 1885 general election Watt was elected as the Member of Parliament (MP) for the newly created Camlachie division of Glasgow, and was re-elected in 1886. Watt became party to several legal battles. In June 1888, he was suing a fellow MP, Charles Cameron, who represented Glasgow College. Cameron had claimed in his newspaper North British Daily Mail that an address given by Watt was plagiarism. In July 1892, Watt was forced to pay damages after losing a libel action. Watt's biggest legal entanglement concerned his marriage and acrimonious divorce.

At the general election in July 1892, he stood again for re-election, this time as an Independent Liberal, but came a poor fourth with only 179 votes (2.3% of the total).

== Personal life ==
Watt married Julia Welstead of Home Place, Whatlington, Sussex in 1880. She petitioned for divorce in May 1896 on the grounds of Watt's adultery and cruelty. In May 1901, Watt was named as co-respondent in a divorce action brought by Sir Reginald William Proctor-Beauchamp, 5th baronet, against his wife, Lady Violet Charlotte Julia Maria Proctor-Beauchamp, daughter of the 5th Earl of Roden. After Sir Reginald obtained his divorce, Watt's wife also obtained a divorce from Watt. In August 1905 Watt was arrested on a charge of attempting to procure the murder of his first wife, who had refused to finalize the divorce. He was found guilty on 21 December 1905, and sentenced to five years' penal servitude. Amid public sentiment that his conviction was based on false testimony, he served less than one year of his sentence and was released on 10 December 1906. Watt and Lady Violet Proctor-Beauchamp were married shortly after his release.

In 1912, Sir Reginald Proctor-Beauchamp died, aged 59. In 1914, Watt's first wife remarried in London In 1921, Watt died in Brighton at the age of 73. In 1923, his first wife died in London, aged 67. In 1925, his second wife / his widow died in Brighton, aged 69.

Parliament of the United Kingdom
New constituency (see Glasgow constituency )	Member of Parliament for Glasgow Camlachie; 1885 –1892	Succeeded by Alexander Cross
