= Halford Mackinder =

English geographer and politician (1861–1947)

The Right Honourable Sir Halford Mackinder
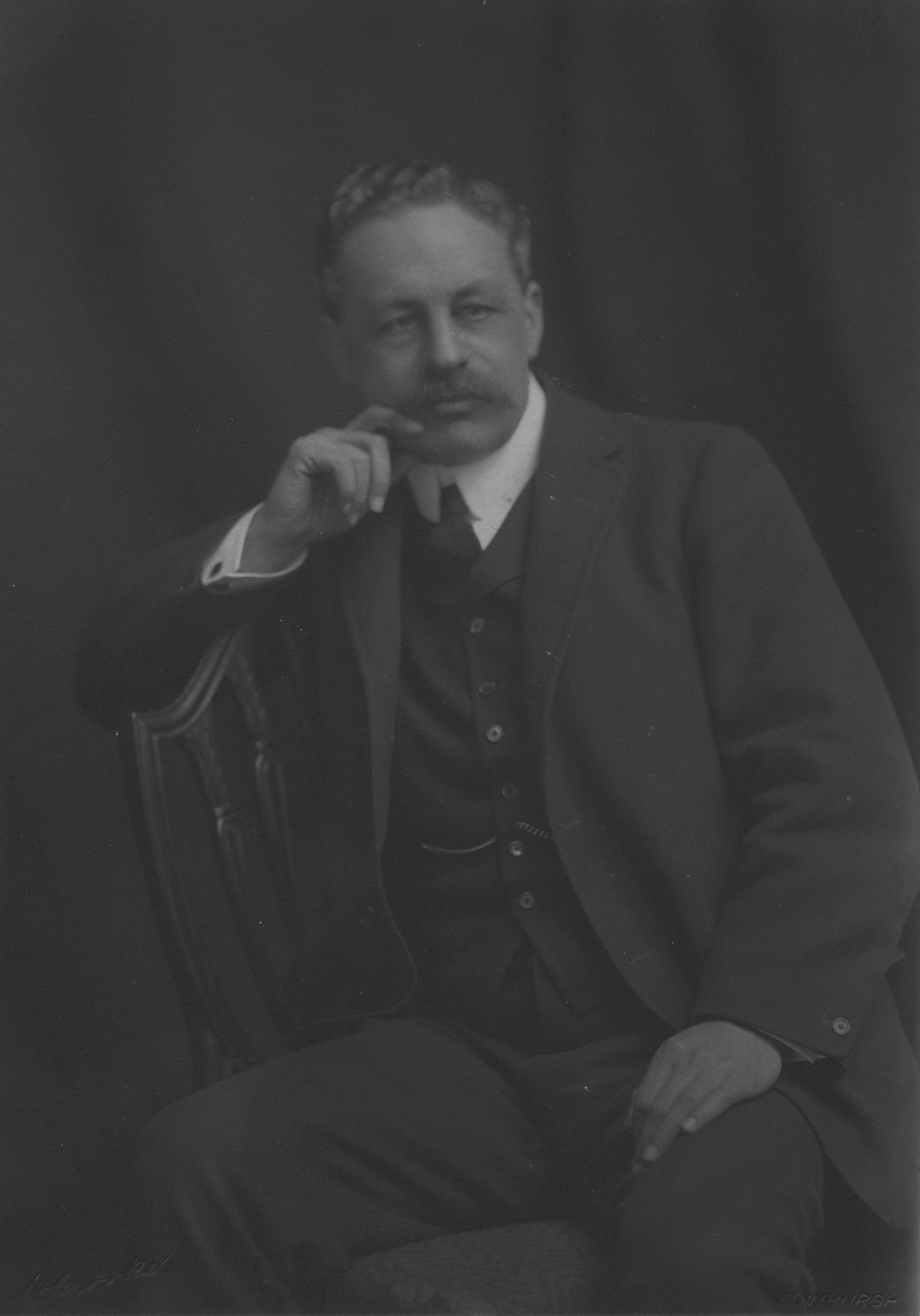

Member of Parliament for Glasgow Camlachie
- In office 15 January 1910 – 15 November 1922
- Preceded by: Alexander Cross
- Succeeded by: Campbell Stephen

Personal details
- Born: Halford John Mackinder; 15 February 1861 Gainsborough, England
- Died: 6 March 1947 (aged 86)
- Party: Liberal Unionist Unionist
- Education: Christ Church, Oxford
- Known for: "The Geographical Pivot of History"
- Awards: Charles P. Daly Medal (1943)
- Scientific career
- Fields: Geography; geopolitics; geostrategy

Sir Halford John Mackinder (15 February 1861 – 6 March 1947) was a British geographer, academic and politician, who is regarded as one of the founding fathers of both geopolitics and geostrategy. He is considered to have introduced the terms "manpower" and "heartland" into the English language. He was the first Principal of University Extension College, Reading (which became the University of Reading) from 1892 to 1903, and Director of the London School of Economics from 1903 to 1908. Initially a liberal and free market proponent, he shifted to support a protectionist and conservative view from 1903. While continuing his academic career part-time, he was also the Conservative and Unionist Member of Parliament for Glasgow Camlachie from 1910 to 1922. From 1923, he was Professor of Geography at the London School of Economics.

== Early life and education ==
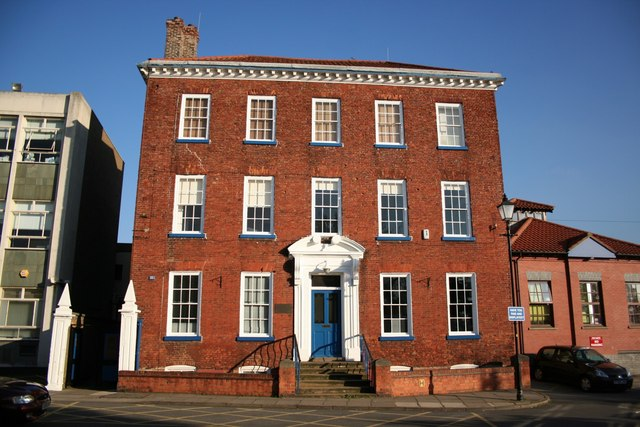
Mackinder's birthplace Elswitha Hall in Gainsborough, Lincolnshire

Mackinder was born in Gainsborough, Lincolnshire, England, the son of doctor Draper Mackinder (1818–1912) and Fanny Anne (1831–1905) née Hewitt, the daughter of a Lichfield physician. Mackinder was educated at Queen Elizabeth's Grammar School in Gainsborough, Epsom College, and Christ Church, Oxford. He often accompanied his father on medical visits into the countryside. His father had an interest in medical geography and had a large library. His father wished that he would study medicine. At Oxford he started studying natural sciences, specializing in zoology under Henry Nottidge Moseley, who had been the naturalist on the Challenger expedition. When he turned to the study of history in his fourth year he was interested in whether evolutionary ideas applied to the human world. He remarked that he was returning "to an old interest and took up modern history with the idea of seeing how the theory of evolution would appear in human development". He would become a strong proponent of treating both physical geography and human geography as a single discipline. Mackinder served as President of the Oxford Union in 1883 apart from being a member of the scientific society, rifle volunteers, and the war games club.

He received a degree in biology in 1883 and one in modern history the next year. In 1885 he shifted to the study of law and he was called to the bar from the Inner Temple in 1886. He worked in court briefly but he lost interest in law.

== Career ==
From 1886, Mackinder took part in giving lectures and courses at extension centres that were created by a group from the Oxford Union headed by Michael Sadler. When he visited London, he came in contact with people at the Royal Geographical Society (RGS). The RGS promoted geography education and Mackinder interacted with Scott Keltie, Henry Bates, Clements Markham and others. It was Francis Galton who encouraged Mackinder to publish a paper "On the Scope and Methods of Geography" in 1887, which is considered as a manifesto for the New Geography. It was a plea for going away from the teaching of isolated facts to a field that included causal relations and structures with the study of the influence of the physical environment on human life and society. A few months later, he was appointed reader in geography at the University of Oxford, a position that was created with help from the RGS, where he introduced the teaching of the subject. As Mackinder himself put it, "a platform has been given to a geographer". This was arguably at the time the most prestigious academic position for a British geographer. In 1892, Sadler promoted the creation of an extension centre at Reading where Mackinder gave lectures. In 1902, it became a university college and Mackinder became the first principal of University Extension College, Reading, a role he retained until he was succeeded, in 1903, by William Macbride Childs. The college became the University of Reading in 1926, a progression that owed no small debt to his early stewardship of the institution. In 1893, he was one of the founders of the Geographical Association (GA), which promoted the teaching of geography in schools. He served as chairman of the GA from 1913 to 1946 and as its President from 1916 to 1917.

Mackinder married Emilie Catherine ("Bonnie") daughter of bible scholar Christian David Ginsburg in 1889. They had a child who died in infancy. They separated in 1900 and she lived on Capri.

In 1895, he was one of the founders of the London School of Economics. At Oxford, Mackinder was the driving force behind the creation of a School of Geography in 1899. It was endorsed by Clements Markham and part of the funding came from the RGS.

=== Mount Kenya expedition ===
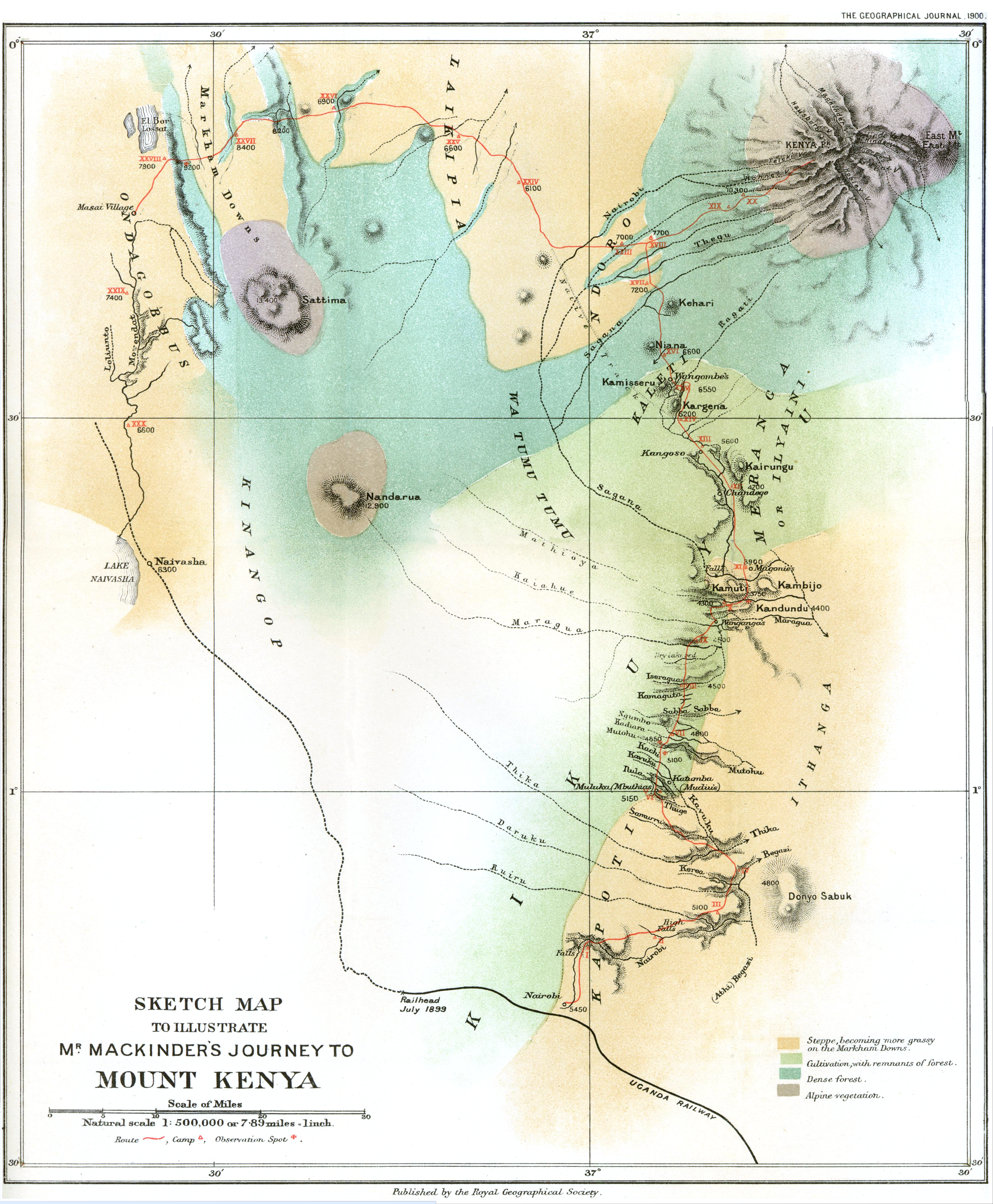
Mackinder's route in East Africa

In 1899, he led an expedition of the first Europeans to climb Mount Kenya. Mackinder's wife's sister was married to Sidney Hinde who recruited porters for the expedition. The members included Campbell Bernard Hausburg (1873–1941) as photographer and camp-master. He was a maternal uncle of Mackinder's wife Emilie. Edward Saunders served as botanist, Claude Camburn as taxidermist and three Swiss mountain porters. The rest of the team consisted of 170 African helpers at the start. Just as they reached Nairobi, there was an outbreak of smallpox so they were asked to set out. They camped at the base of the mountain but food supplies were not coming through. A party was sent to Naivasha to find supplies. Forty-nine Kikuyus were sent back because food that they expected would be supplied by Masai people was not to be found, the Masai having migrated due to famine. There was a dysentery death and six other Kikuyus deserted. Many of the specimens collected were lost through the actions of his porters. Several porters were punished and eight of his African porters were shot dead, marked on a letter in Hausburg's hand as "shot by order"; it is disputed as to who killed them, as both Mackinder and another man, Edward Saunders were recorded issuing death threats.

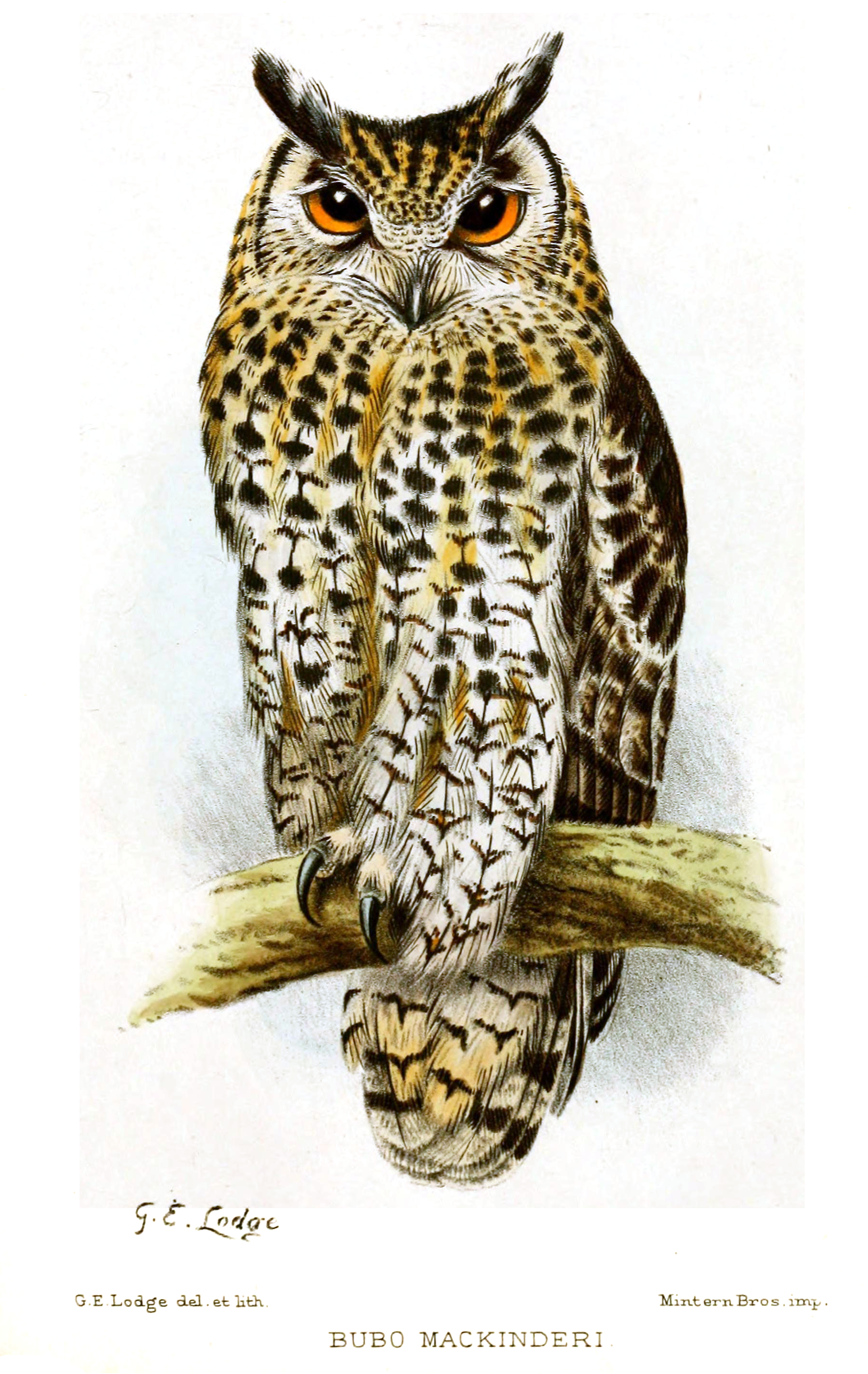
Bubo capensis mackinderi

Mackinder named the three main peaks of Mount Kenya as Nelian, Batian and Lenana after the names of Masai chiefs as suggested by Sidney Hinde. Sidney and his wife Holda Hinde were working on a book on the Masai people and this was sent back to be edited and published by Mackinder's wife. Many specimens were brought back by the expedition. A new species owl, now treated as a subspecies of the Cape eagle owl Bubo capensis mackinderi, was named after him by Richard Bowdler Sharpe.

Mackinder published some notes from the expedition to the Geographical Journal and the Proceedings of the Zoological Society but a book that he was working on was never published. It had been suggested that this was due to the problems he faced with the expedition. The book was posthumously published in 1991 and it has been suggested that the real problem was the separation of Mackinder from his wife towards the end of 1900. His wife had retained the typescript and it was not after World War II that it finally was deposited at the School of Geography in Oxford.

=== Politics ===
From 1900, Mackinder taught economic geography at the London School of Economics and in 1902 he became a full-time lecturer and put in charge of setting up a geography department at the LSE. In 1905 he resigned his position at Oxford. In 1903 he became the second director of the LSE and worked here until 1908. Here he organized courses for army officers in the colonial services at what came to be known as "Mackindergarten". His position brought him into a circle of influential people. He became a member of the Coefficients dining club, set up in 1902 by the Fabian campaigners Sidney and Beatrice Webb, which brought together social reformers and advocates of national efficiency. Other members included Leo S. Amery, Sir Edward Grey, W. A. S. Hewins, L. J. Maxse, H. G. Wells, and Michael Sadler. At the 1900 election Mackinder sought a seat as a Liberal candidate at Warwick and Leamington and was defeated. By 1903, Mackinder had changed his political position and no longer supported free trade. He quit the Liberals, advocated protectionism and became a Conservative Party member. In 1904 he formulated his "Heartland Theory" and became keenly involved in geopolitics. In 1904 he founded the Compatriots Club along with Hewins and Amery which supported tariffs in imperialism. In 1908 he was funded by Alfred Milner and Leo Amery to take part in politics. He visited Canada and gave lectures on imperialism. He stood unsuccessfully as a Liberal Unionist in a by-election for Hawick Burghs in 1909. He was elected to Parliament in January 1910 as Liberal Unionist member for the Glasgow Camlachie constituency and remained MP until he was defeated in 1922 as a Unionist. He was knighted in the 1920 New Year Honours for his services as an MP, and appointed a Privy Counsellor in the 1926 Birthday Honours.

=== Geography and geopolitics ===
In 1902, he published Britain and the British Seas, which included the first comprehensive geomorphology of the British Isles and which became a classic in regional geography. In 1904, Mackinder gave a paper on "The Geographical Pivot of History" at the Royal Geographical Society, in which he formulated the Heartland Theory. This is often considered as a, if not the, founding moment of geopolitics as a field of study, although Mackinder did not use the term. Whilst the Heartland Theory initially received little attention outside geography, this theory would later exercise some influence on the foreign policies of world powers.

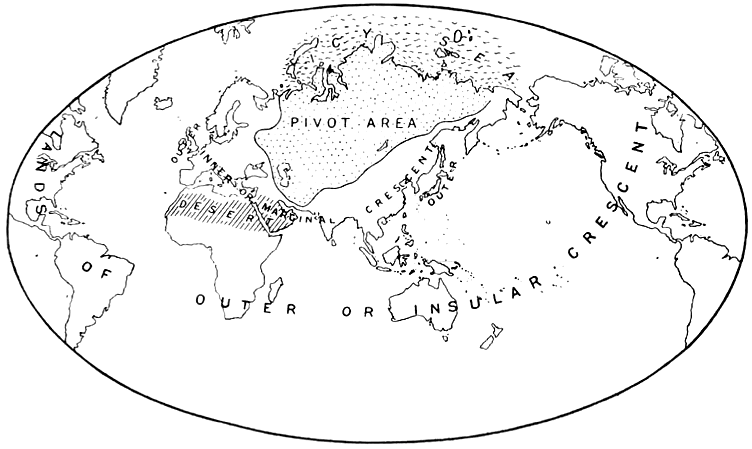
A 1904 map from Mackinder's The Geographical Pivot of History.

His next major work, Democratic Ideals and Reality: A Study in the Politics of Reconstruction, appeared in 1919. It followed the 1904 book titled The Geographic Pivot of the History, and presented his theory of the Heartland and made a case for fully taking into account geopolitical factors at the Paris Peace conference and contrasted (geographical) reality with Woodrow Wilson's idealism. The book's most famous quote was: "Who rules East Europe commands the Heartland; Who rules the Heartland commands the World Island; Who rules the World Island commands the World." This message was composed to convince the world statesmen at the Paris Peace conference of the crucial importance of Eastern Europe as the strategic route to the Heartland was interpreted as requiring a strip of buffer states to separate Germany and Russia. These were created by the peace negotiators but proved to be ineffective bulwarks in 1939 (although this may be seen as a failure of other, later statesmen during the interbellum). The principal concern of his work was to warn of the possibility of another major war (a warning also given by economist John Maynard Keynes).

Mackinder was anti-Bolshevik, and was appointed by Lord Curzon as British High Commissioner in Southern Russia in late 1919. He reported back from his visit to Lloyd George's cabinet in January 1920: he suggested that Britain support a plan for the White Russian forces to recognise Polish independence, which he attempted to unite. Mackinder's last major work was the 1943 article, "The Round World and the Winning of the Peace", in which he envisioned a post-war world. He reiterated and expanded his Heartland view of the world, suggesting that the Atlantic Ocean would be jumped, with North America's influence pulled into the region by its use of Britain as a "moated aerodrome". Elsewhere in the world, beyond the "girdle of deserts and wilderness", and the "Great Ocean" region of the Indo-Pacific Rim, was the "Monsoon lands" area of India and China that would grow in power.

Mackinder was contemporary of the Swedish political scientist Rudolf Kjellén, born three years later, who like Mackinder was a conservative member of the national parliament from 1910 until 1922 (year of his death). The two fathers of geopolitics both believed that the development of international transportation on land was growing to such a high rate "that the advantage of the sea powers was more of historical importance. Hence, they argued that the pivot of the global political power was the land control of Eurasia while a naval power – such as the Great Britain – was playing a secondary role. They disagreed about Mackinder's emphasis on serving the British Empire.

== Significance ==
Mackinder's work paved the way for the establishment of geography as a distinct discipline in the United Kingdom. His role in fostering the teaching of geography is probably greater than that of any other single British geographer.

Whilst Oxford did not appoint a statutory Professor of Geography until 1932, both the University of Liverpool and University of Wales, Aberystwyth established professorial chairs in Geography in 1917. Mackinder himself became Professor of Geography at the University of London (London School of Economics) in 1923.

Mackinder is often credited with introducing two new terms into the English language: "manpower" and "heartland". In 1944, he received the Charles P. Daley medal from the American Geographical Society, and in 1945 was awarded the Royal Geographical Society's Patron's Medal for his service in the advancement of the science of Geography. Mackinder's work was an influence on Karl Haushofer, for which Mackinder was maligned after World War II.

The Heartland Theory and more generally classical geopolitics and geostrategy were extremely influential in the making of US strategic policy during the period of the Cold War. Arguably it continued afterwards. The theory has seen a revival in application to China's Belt and Road Initiative. On China, Mackinder predicted in 1904 that it may become the greatest threat "to the world's freedom" because of it "would add an oceanic frontage to the resources of the great continent."

Evidence of Mackinder's Heartland Theory can be found in the works of geopolitician Dimitri Kitsikis, particularly in his geopolitical model "Intermediate Region". In the book Sri Lanka at Crossroads, Asanga Abeyagoonasekera revisits Mackinder's 1904 Map while highlighting the geostrategic importance of Sri Lanka. Reviewing the work, Swaran Singh writes, "Asanga talks of Mackinder's 'outer crescent' that makes him see two other nations, Britain and Japan, being similarly ordained. However, as world drifts from continents to Oceans following Mahanian axioms, it leaves only Sri Lanka that sits in the midst of global east-west super expressway of sea lanes of communications connecting the two ends of the Indo-Pacific geopolitical paradigm.". His ideas experienced a revival of interest in post-Cold War former-Soviet Central Asia, in particular the republics of Uzbekistan, Kyrgyzstan and Kazakhstan.

== Works ==
- Mackinder, H.J. "On the Scope and Methods of Geography", Proceedings of the Royal Geographical Society and Monthly Record of Geography, New Monthly Series, Vol. 9, No. 3 (Mar. 1887), pp. 141–174.
- Mackinder, H.J. Sadler, M.E. University extension: has it a future?, London, Frowde, 1890.
- Mackinder, H.J. "The Physical Basis of Political Geography", Scottish Geographical Magazine Vol 6, No 2, 1890, pp. 78–84.
- Mackinder, H.J. "A Journey to the Summit of Mount Kenya, British East Africa", The Geographical Journal, Vol. 15, No. 5 (May 1900), pp. 453–476.
- Mackinder, H.J. Britain and the British Seas. New York: D. Appleton and company, 1902.
- Mackinder, H.J. "An Expedition to Possil, an Outpost on the Frontiers of the Civilised World", The Times. 12 October 1903.
- Mackinder, H.J. "The geographical pivot of history". The Geographical Journal, 1904, 23, pp. 421–37. Available online as Mackinder, H.J. "The Geographical Pivot of History", in Democratic Ideals and Reality, Washington, DC: National Defence University Press, 1996, pp. 175–194.
- Mackinder, H.J. "Man-Power as a Measure of National and Imperial Strength", National and English Review, XLV, 1905.
- Mackinder, H.J. "Geography and History", The Times. 9 February 1905.
- Mackinder, H.J. as editor of The Regions of the World series which includes the 1902 Britain and the British Seas mentioned above—which included The Nearer East by D. G. Hogarth London, Henry Frowde, 1902 and 1905
- Mackinder, H.J. Our Own Islands: An Elementary Study in Geography, London: G. Philips, 1907
- Mackinder, H.J. The Rhine: Its Valley & History. New York: Dodd, Mead. 1908.
- Mackinder, H.J. Eight Lectures on India. London: Waterlow, 1910.
- Mackinder, H.J. The Modern British State: An Introduction to the Study of Civics. London: G. Philip, 1914.
- Mackinder, H.J. Democratic Ideals and Reality: A Study in the Politics of Reconstruction. New York: Holt, 1919. Available online as Democratic ideals and reality; a study in the politics of reconstruction Democratic Ideals and Reality, Washington, DC: National Defence University Press, 1996.
- Mackinder, H.J. 1943. "The round world and the winning of the peace", Foreign Affairs, 21 (1943) 595–605. Available online as Mackinder, H.J. "The round world and the winning of the peace", in Democratic Ideals and Reality, Washington, DC: National Defence University Press, 1996, pp. 195–205.

Educational offices
Preceded by William Hewins	Director of the London School of Economics; 1903–1908	Succeeded by William Pember Reeves
Parliament of the United Kingdom
Preceded by Alexander Cross	Member of Parliament for Glasgow Camlachie; 1910–1922	Succeeded by Campbell Stephen
