= Hintlesham =

Village in Suffolk, England

Coordinates: 52.05°N 1.05°E

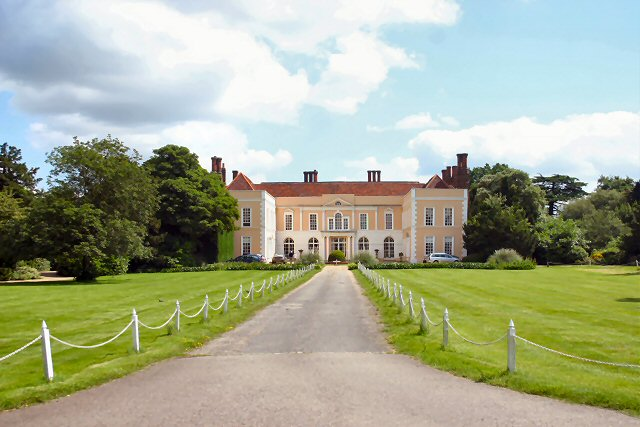
- Hintlesham Hall

- Location within Suffolk
- Population: 609 (2011 Census)
- District: Babergh
- Shire county: Suffolk
- Region: East
- Country: England
- Sovereign state: United Kingdom
- Post town: Ipswich
- Postcode district: IP8
- UK Parliament: South Suffolk

Hintlesham is a small village in Suffolk, England, situated roughly halfway between Ipswich and Hadleigh. It is in the Belstead Brook electoral division of Suffolk County Council.

The village is notable for Hintlesham Hall, a 16th-century Grade I listed country house, now operated as a hotel.

== The church ==
The parish church of St Nicolas is a typical Decorated church, and therefore not typical for Suffolk. It has many memorials to the Tymperley family and the squint in the north wall shows that the vestry was once a chapel, possibly a chantry to the family, converted to secular use in the 1540s. The stairway to the roodloft in the south wall is one of the best preserved in the county. For about 350 years Hintlesham has been a joint parish with Chattisham whose church, St Margaret's, stands about a mile away, separated by a valley of meadows and woods.

== Hintlesham Hall ==
For six years from 1448, Hintlesham Manor, a single-storey Tudor Hall, was owned by Sir John Fortescue who used one of the rooms as a local court. In 1454 the manor was purchased by John Timperley.

In August 1720 the hall was bought by Richard Powys, a Principal Clerk to The Treasury, and the Powys family lived there for nearly 30 years, after which it was sold to the lawyer Richard Lloyd, a future solicitor-general, and passed down through his descendants until the early 1900s.

In 1972 the hall was bought by chef Robert Carrier for £32,000 (equivalent to £380,000 in 2025) and was restored. The business was later owned by the hotelier and broadcaster Ruth Watson and her husband. Today the hall is operated as a country-house hotel.

== Amenities ==
The village has its own Church of England Voluntary Aided junior school.

The village public house is The George, the original premises of which burned down at the end of the 19th century.

== Notable residents ==
- Richard Lloyd (1697 – 1761), Solicitor General for England and Wales and Member of Parliament for Mitchell
- Richard Savage Lloyd (c.1730 –1810), landowner and Member of Parliament for Totnes
- Mary Stopford, Countess of Courtown (1736 –1810)
- Robert Hamilton Lloyd-Anstruther (1841 – 1914), army officer and Conservative Party politician, Member of Parliament for Woodbridge
- Havelock Ellis (1859 – 1939), physician, eugenicist, writer, progressive intellectual
- Hensley Henson (1863 – 1947), former Bishop of Durham
- Stephen Moulsdale (1872 – 1944), priest and Vice-Chancellor of Durham University
- Percy Edwards (1908 – 1996), animal impersonator, ornithologist and entertainer
- Robert Carrier (1923 – 2006), chef, restaurateur and cookery writer
- Ruth Watson (born 1950), hotelier, broadcaster and food writer
