= Clavering Fison =

English businessman and politician

Sir Frank Guy Clavering Fison (11 December 1892 – 13 April 1985) was an English businessman and Conservative Party politician. He was chairman of the family business, Fisons, from 1929 to 1962. He was also the Member of Parliament (MP) for Woodbridge from 1929 to 1931. He was knighted in 1957.

== Early life ==
Fison was born on 11 December 1892 in Sproughton, Suffolk, the son of James and Lucy Fison. He was educated at Charterhouse then Christ Church, Oxford. He played Tennis for the university while at Oxford and competed at Wimbledon. During the First World War he served as a Lieutenant in the Suffolk Regiment and later as a major in the newly formed Royal Air Force.

== Fisons ==
In 1929 Fison played a part in the formation of what would become Fison Limited and he would remain as chairman until 1962. He was later life president of the company.

== Political life ==
In 1929 he was returned as Member of Parliament for Woodbridge. He only served one term and did not stand in the 1931 election. Fison was a Justice of the Peace for East Suffolk and he was appointed High Sheriff of Suffolk in 1942. In 1957 he was knighted and in 1958 he was appointed a Deputy Lieutenant of Suffolk.

== Family life ==
Fison married Evelyn Alice Bland and they had two daughters. He died on 13 April 1985 aged 92.

Parliament of the United Kingdom
Preceded by Arthur Churchman	Member of Parliament for Woodbridge; 1929 – 1931	Succeeded by Walter Ross-Taylor
