= Robert Hamilton Lloyd-Anstruther =

British Army officer and politician (1841–1914)

Robert Hamilton Lloyd-Anstruther (21 April 1841 – 24 August 1914) was a British army officer and Conservative Party politician.

The son of Captain James Hamilton Lloyd-Anstruther and his wife Georgiana née Burrell. Following officer training at the Royal Military College, Sandhurst, he entered the Rifle Brigade as an ensign in 1858, and immediately saw action in the later stages of the Indian Mutiny. In 1862 he rose to the rank of lieutenant by purchase He fought in the operations to repulse the Fenian raids in Canada in 1866, and was promoted to captain in 1872. In 1871 he married Gertrude Louisa Georgiana Fitzroy of Hampshire. He served as a garrison instructor for the South Eastern District until 1881 when he was appointed aide de camp to General Edward Newdegate in the Colony of Natal in 1881. He retired on half pay in the same year. However, he returned to the army shortly afterwards, rising to the rank of major and serving with distinction in the Suakin Expedition of 1885. In that year he retired from the army with the rank of honorary lieutenant-colonel in the Suffolk Rifle Volunteer Corps.

At the 1886 general election, Lloyd-Anstruther was chosen by the Conservative Party to contest the South Eastern or Woodbridge Division of Suffolk, a constituency held by the Liberal Party Member of Parliament, Robert Lacey Everett. He won the seat for the Conservatives, but only served a single term in parliament, with Everett regaining the seat in 1892 general election.

On his father's death in 1882, Lloyd-Anstruther had inherited Hintlesham Hall near Ipswich in Suffolk. He later entered local government as an alderman on East Suffolk County Council, and was appointed a justice of the peace and a deputy lieutenant of Suffolk. He died in 1914, survived by his wife and one son, Fitzroy Anstruther-Gough-Calthorpe, who was later created a baronet.

Parliament of the United Kingdom
Preceded by Robert Lacey Everett	Member of Parliament for Woodbridge; 1886–1892	Succeeded by Robert Lacey Everett
