= Alexander Cross =

Scottish politician

Sir Alexander Cross, 1st Baronet (4 November 1847 – 13 February 1914), was a Scottish politician. He served as the Liberal Unionist MP for Glasgow Camlachie.

In 1891 Cross was selected as the Unionist candidate. He was elected in 1892, but towards the end of his time as an MP in 1909 he defected to the Liberals over the free trade issue and lost his seat to the Liberal Unionists in January 1910. An obituary in The Times notes his political popularity was due to his efforts across two decades to reform the missive system of letting in Scotland which culminated in the House Letting and Rating (Scotland) Act, (1 & 2 Geo. 5. c. 53).

On 5 July 1912 he was created a Baronet, of Marchbank Wood in the Parish of Kilpatrick Juxta in the County of Dumfries and of the City of Glasgow, this title was held by the Cross Baronets until it became extinct in 1963.

At the time of his election in 1892, Cross was a partner in Alexander Cross & Sons, fertiliser manufacturers and seed merchants, and a director of the Scottish Mortgage and Land Investment Company of New Mexico. He married firstly Jessie Coats, second daughter of Sir Peter Coats of Paisley, who died in 1901, and secondly Agnes Lawrie, daughter of shipbuilder James Gray Lawrie.

== Publications ==
Cross, Alexander (1911) The Lands of the West. Glasgow: James Hedderwick & Sons

Cross, Alexander (1912) Explanatory Notes on the House-Letting and Rating (Scotland) Act, 1911. Glasgow: Tenants’ Defence Associations of Scotland. National Library of Scotland

Parliament of the United Kingdom
Preceded by Hugh Watt	Member of Parliament for Glasgow Camlachie; 1892–January 1910	Succeeded by Halford Mackinder
Baronetage of the United Kingdom
New creation	Baronet (of Marchbank Wood and the City of Glasgow); 1912–1914	Succeeded by William Cross
