= James Kessack =

British trade unionist

James O'Connor Kessack (19 October 1879 – 13 November 1916) was a British trade unionist.

Born in Aberdeen, Kessack grew up in Huntly and Inverurie, and worked from an early age to support his family, his father struggling to find work, and both of his parents dying while he was young. He moved to Glasgow to find employment shortly before his father's death, and his younger siblings then moved in with him.

Highly religious in his youth, Kessack became a socialist after hearing Robert Smillie speak at the 1901 North East Lanarkshire by-election. Sam MacDonald of the Independent Labour Party (ILP) noticed Kessack's speaking ability and persuaded him to join, and Kessack later joined the Socialist Labour Party, Industrial Workers of the World and then was a founder member of the Advocates of Industrial Unionism. He resigned from the SLP after the party forbade members from speaking at meetings of any other group, but remained prominent in the ILP, and the group sponsored his unsuccessful candidatures for the Labour Party at both the January and December 1910 general elections in Glasgow Camlachie.

Kessack became the national organiser of the National Union of Dock Labourers (NUDL) in 1909, replacing James Larkin. Although during his first couple of years, membership of the union fell in Scotland, he managed to recruit large numbers of new members in the Humber ports, and was regarded as a successful figure. However, he left his post in 1914 to join the Scottish Horse regiment of the British Army. He was promoted to become a captain, but was killed in the Battle of the Ancre in November 1916.
