= Richard Lloyd (died 1761) =

English solicitor-general and Member of Parliament

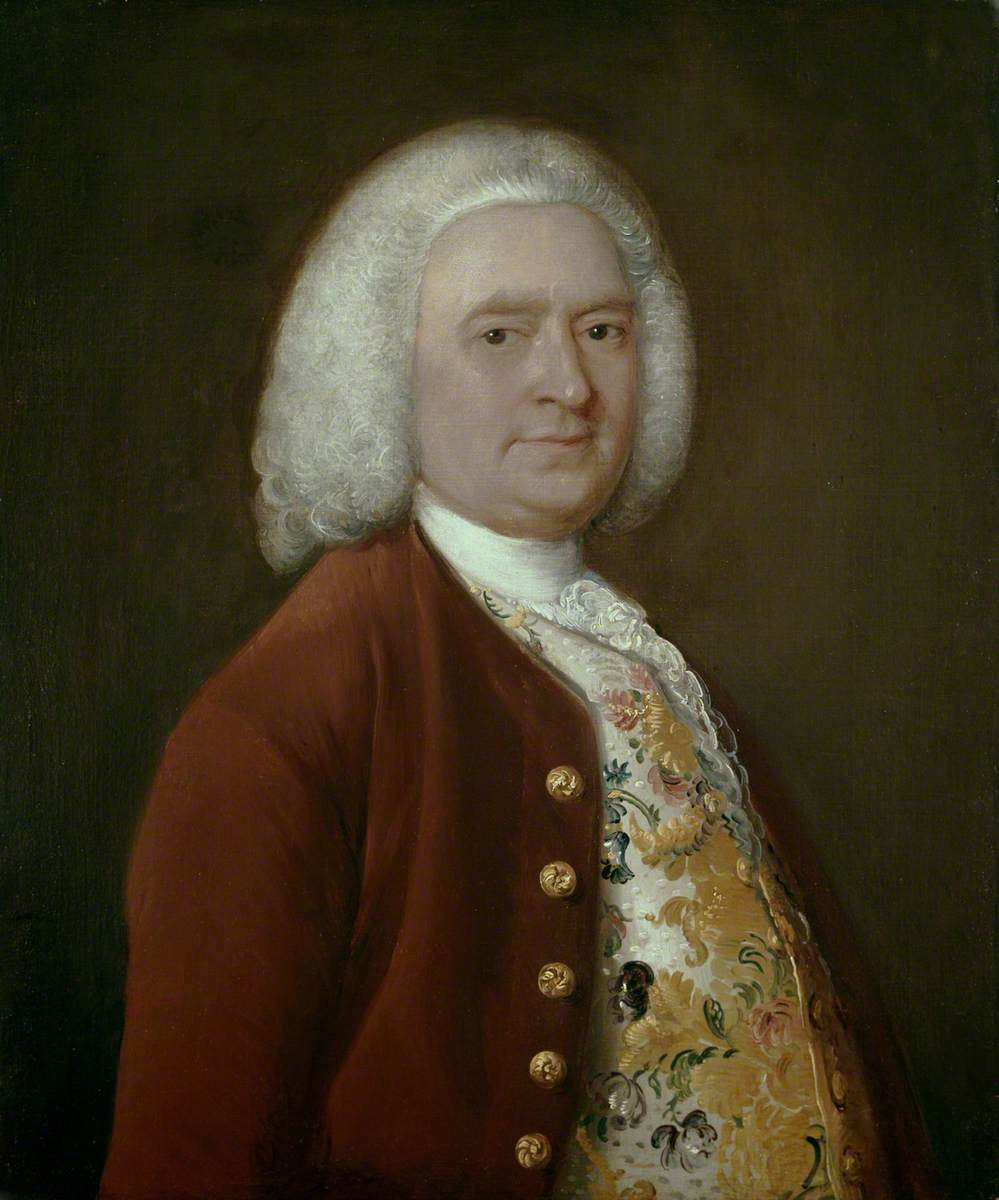

Sir Richard Lloyd (bapt. 31 May 1697 – 1761), of Hintlesham Hall, Suffolk, was an English solicitor-general and Member of Parliament.

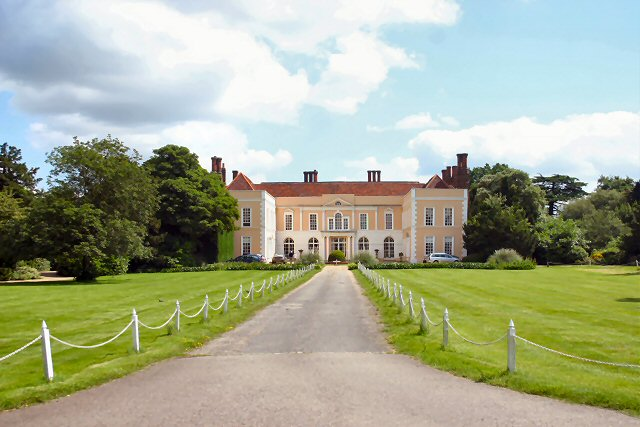
Hintlesham Hall, Suffolk

He was born the son of Talbot Lloyd of Lichfield and educated at Lichfield grammar school and St. John’s College, Cambridge. He entered the Middle Temple in 1720 to study law, was called to the bar in 1723, and made a bencher in 1738. He succeeded his father before 1713, and his wife's brother to Crustwic.

He was made King's Counsel (K.C.) in 1738 and appointed Solicitor General for England and Wales for 1754–6. He was elevated to serjeant-at-law in 1759, appointed a Baron of the Exchequer for 1759–61 and served as the Recorder of Harwich, Orford and Ipswich. He was knighted in 1745.

He was a Member (MP) of the Parliament of Great Britain for Mitchell 14 May 1745 – 1747, for Maldon 1747–1754 and for Totnes 13 December 1754 – September 1759.

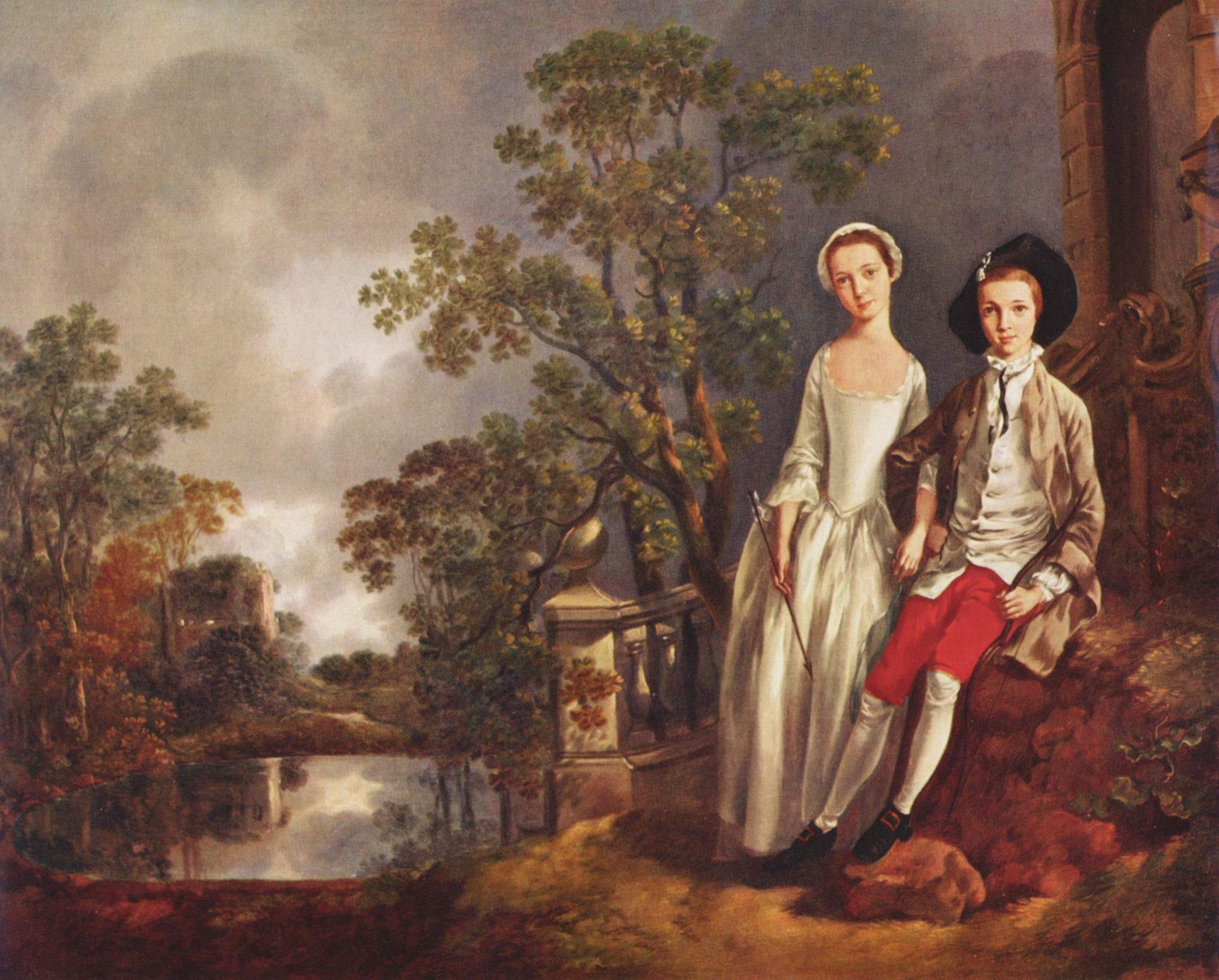
Heneage Lloyd and sister Lucy by Thomas Gainsborough, 1753

In 1745, he was the major beneficiary in the will of Lady Winchilsea (widow of Heneage Finch, 3rd Earl of Winchilsea) and in 1747 bought Hintlesham Hall in Suffolk from the Powys family.

He married Elizabeth, the daughter of William Field of Crustwic, Essex, and had two sons and a daughter. His sons Richard Savage Lloyd and Heneage Lloyd, were both painted by Thomas Gainsborough. His eldest son and heir Richard Savage inherited Hintlesham and also followed his father as MP for Totnes.
