= Walter Ross Taylor =

Scottish minister

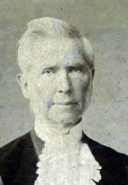
Rev Dr Walter Ross Taylor photographed in 1884

Walter Ross Taylor (1805–1896) was a Scottish minister of the Free Church of Scotland who served as Moderator of the General Assembly 1884/85.

== Life ==
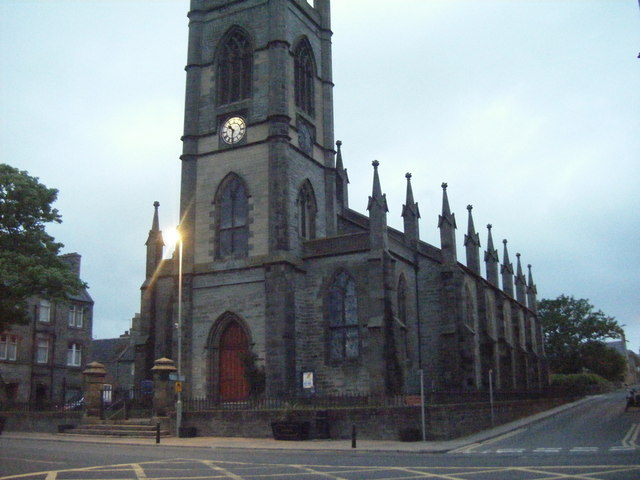
Thurso Parish Church

He was born in Tain in northern Scotland on 11 November 1805 the son of the sheriff clerk of Cromarty. His mother Flora Ross was sister of Col Walter Ross of Nigg House and inherited the house on his death. The house held feudal superiority over the village of Nigg.

Walter was educated at the Royal Academy in Tain then from 1819 studied at King's College, Aberdeen winning the Hutton Prize as best 4th year student. He then studied to be a minister at the Divinity Hall in Aberdeen, Edinburgh and Glasgow to train as a minister for the Church of Scotland. He was ordained at Chadwell Street Church in Islington in London in 1829.

In 1831 he became minister of Old Saint Peter's in Thurso. In 1832, the new parish church (pictured) was consecrated.

In the Disruption of 1843 he left the established church to join the Free Church of Scotland. A large part of his congregation left with him. A new church was built almost immediately. A new manse was built in 1850. The church was rebuilt in 1875.

In 1884 he succeeded Rev Horatius Bonar as Moderator of the General Assembly. He was succeeded in turn in 1885 by Rev David Brown.

From 1894 he was assisted by Rev George Herbert Morrison. He died on 5 October 1896 aged 90 and Morrison then took his place, building the Thurso Mission Hall soon thereafter.

The Thurso church was replaced in the 1970s by a new building.

== Works ==
- The Reception of the Gospel and a Conversation becoming It, a sermon (London, 1830)
- Last Sermon Preached in the Old Church of Thurso (Thurso, 1832, 1833, and 1841)
- Assembly Addresses (p.p., n.p., 1884)
- Sermon on Psalm LXXXV., 10 (p.p.)
- Account of the Parish (New Statistical Account, xv.)
- Sermon XLIV. (Free Church Pulpit, i.)
- Sermons and Assembly Addresses in Memorials of Caithness Ministers.

== Family ==
He was twice married. His first wife was Isabella Murray, daughter of William Murray of Pitcalzean, whom he married in 1833. Their only son out of five children was Rev Walter Ross Taylor (1838–1907) who was father in turn to Walter Ross-Taylor MP.

His son Walter was Moderator in 1900 and oversaw the critical Union with the United Presbyterian Church of Scotland.

He married:

- (1) 9 May 1833, Isobel (died March 1884), second daughter of William Murray of Pitcalzean, Ross, and sister of William Murray of Geanies, and had issue —
  - Christina Barbara Ross, born 28 July 1834 (married 1857, Alexander Auld, minister of Free Church, Olrig)
  - Flora Ross, born 14 May 1836 (married F. R. Johnstone)
  - Walter Ross, D.D., minister of Kelvinside United Free Church, Glasgow, Moderator of the Free Church General Assembly in 1900, born 11 April 1838, died 6 December 1907
  - Esther Murray, born 13 June 1841 (married Alexander Middleton, Rose Farm, Invergordon)
  - Jemima Alexa, born 11 March 1843 (married Provost William Mackay, Thurso)
- (2) 23 March 1887, (aged 82), Isabella (born 25 October 1843, died 6 April 1928), daughter of William Macdonald, Pennyland, Thurso.
