= Robert Carrier (chef) =

American chef (1923–2006)

- Carrier in 1982
- Born: Robert Carrier McMahon; November 10, 1923; Tarrytown, New York, U.S.
- Died: June 27, 2006 (aged 82); Provence, France
- Education: Grandmother, Chez Fifine
- Occupations: Chef, restaurateur, author
- Years active: 1949−1996
- Culinary career
- Cooking style: French; Italian; Moroccan
- Previous restaurant(s): Camden Passage, Islington Hintlesham Hall
- Television show(s): Carrier's Kitchen Food, Wine and Friends The Gourmet Vegetarian Carrier's Caribbean.
- Award won: Order of the British Empire

Robert Carrier McMahon, OBE (November 10, 1923 – June 27, 2006), usually known as Robert Carrier, was an American chef, restaurateur and cookery writer. His success came in England, where he was based from 1953 to 1984, and then from 1994 until his death.

== Biography ==
Robert Carrier McMahon was born in Tarrytown, New York, the third son of a wealthy property lawyer father of Irish descent; his mother was the Franco-German daughter of a millionaire. After his parents went bankrupt in the 1930s Great Depression, they maintained their lifestyle by firing their servants and preparing their own elaborate dinner parties.

Educated in New York City, Robert took part-time art courses and trained to become an actor. He had a part in the Broadway revue New Faces, before touring Europe with a rep company, singing the juvenile lead in American musicals. After returning to America, Robert often stayed at weekends with his beloved French grandmother in upstate New York. She taught him to cook, making biscuits and butter-frying fish caught in a nearby stream.

=== Post World War II ===
Carrier volunteered to serve in the United States Army during World War II as an intelligence officer in the Office of Strategic Services, a wartime forerunner of the Central Intelligence Agency. Speaking fluent French and understanding German thanks to his parentage, Carrier arrived in England in 1943, and after D-Day served in Paris as a cryptographer in General Charles de Gaulle's headquarters.

Carrier chose to remain in Paris as a civilian after the cessation of hostilities, and dropped his surname McMahon: "It (Robert Carrier) sounds good in French and it looks well visually." Carrier initially worked for a US forces radio station and for a Gaullist publication, Spectacle, set up to support de Gaulle's RPF party in its failed bid for post-war power.

After a theatrical magazine that he edited and partly owned was shut down in 1949, Carrier moved to St. Tropez to work in a friend's restaurant, Chez Fifine, where he found relief from a bout of depression. Starting to write about food as ration-restricted Europe got used to flavour again, Carrier moved to Rome, Italy, to improve his cookery repertoire, and take the role of a cowboy in an Italian musical revue.

After a friend invited him to Great Britain for the 1953 coronation of Elizabeth II, he decided to relocate to London. He worked in the developing industry of public relations, marketing various food products including stock cubes, cornflour, New Zealand apples and a vegetarian dog food. With Oliver Lawson Dick, Carrier wrote The Vanished City, a historical perspective of London illustrated with reproductions of old engravings.

=== Cookery career ===
In 1957 Carrier wrote his first article on food, which he sold to Harper's Bazaar editor Eileen Dickson. He was soon writing regularly for the magazine before becoming a contributor to Vogue and then writing a weekly column for the colour supplement of The Sunday Times. This column brought him celebrity; the articles were collected and expanded to create his first cookery book, the lavishly illustrated Great Dishes of the World, in 1963. Although priced at 70 shillings, (equivalent to £64 in 2025), it sold 11 million copies.

Assured of publicity, Carrier opened the eponymous restaurant Carrier's in 1966 in Camden Passage, Islington, then developed an international chain of cookshops, with the first in Harrods in 1967. His recipes were printed on wipe-clean cards (a convenient innovation), and were more specific in their quantities and directions than some of those of his competitor Elizabeth David; they made it feasible for an amateur to prepare food that would satisfy the eye and palate of even demanding dinner guests.

In 1971, he saw a full-page advertisement in Country Life for Hintlesham Hall near Ipswich, Suffolk and bought it, unsurveyed, for £32,000. He planned to renovate it slowly as a country retreat but, realising its vulnerability and near dereliction with rotten floors and ceilings, he decided to save it all immediately. He employed 60 people to restore the house and opened it as a hotel and restaurant in August 1972. He also revived the Hintlesham Festival.

A few years later, Carrier met a woman who lived near his Paris apartment. He thought her a remarkable cook but a poor businesswoman; so, when she got into financial difficulties over non-payment of tax, he offered to set her up as a cookery teacher at Hintlesham if she would learn to speak English. He invested about £300,000 converting the 16th-century outbuildings into a modern school. The school had a double auditorium and two classrooms, each with 12 cooking stations. The woman never learned English so he ran the school himself. He presented beginners' and intermediate courses. The mornings were devoted to generic cooking skills and, in the afternoons, students cooked recipes from the Hintlesham Hall restaurant menu. The school attracted people from throughout the anglophone world, but Carrier was disappointed to find that many were attracted more by his celebrity than by an interest in cookery. He found the repetitive work of teaching onerous and dull.

In the late 1970s, Carrier began presenting a television series, Carrier's Kitchen, based on the cooking cards from his Sunday Times articles. After the more traditional British fare often presented by British TV cooking programme host Fanny Cradock in her black and white shows, Carrier in colour television format introduced British TV viewers to a more exotic range of Continental cooking. With a highly theatrical and camp style, and "a penchant for superlatives ("Gooorgeous… Adooorable… Faaabulous!"), he "attracted viewers as much for his drawling American vowels and shameless self-promotion". His later followed this with three other series, titled Food, Wine and Friends, The Gourmet Vegetarian and Carrier's Caribbean. From this greater publicity flowed a substantial partwork magazine published weekly by Marshall Cavendish between 1981 and 1983, and later reissued.

=== Retirement ===
By the early 1980s, Carrier's television style was considered kitsch and too old-fashioned, and his food too complex. Ejected from his television show and bored with the celebrity culture, Carrier closed the Michelin two starred Hintlesham Hall in 1982, and sold it the following year to English hotelier Ruth Watson and her husband. After closing the also Michelin two starred Camden Passage restaurant, Carrier took a short stay in New York, and from 1984 went to live in France and at his restored villa in Morocco, regularly accompanied by his friend Oliver Lawson Dick.

On January 19, 1983, Carrier was the subject of the United Kingdom television show This Is Your Life. He became popular in the United States in the 1980s, writing a weekly European food column for a popular US magazine. In 1984 he became the face of the British restaurant industry, arguing vigorously and vocally for changes to the licensing laws. His efforts were rewarded by appointment as honorary OBE.

Having lived in Marrakesh for several months of each year since the 1970s, Carrier used his Moroccan experiences as the basis for another cookbook in 1987, which further funded his retirement. His 1999 rewrite of Great Dishes of the World did not sell, because he replaced rich and calorific Carrier classics with modern pared-down Nouvelle Cuisine.

By 1994 Carrier had returned to London, realising that most of his Christmas cards were from Britain. He also returned to television with GMTV, proclaiming the virtues of economical and vegetarian eating. Having sold his villa in Morocco, he owned a property in Provence where he spent his time painting pictures, tended by good friend Liz Glaze after the death of Oliver Lawson Dick. Carrier was admitted to hospital in the South of France on the morning of June 27, 2006; his death was announced to the Press Association by Liz Glaze on the afternoon of the same day.

== Television ==
- 1975 Carrier's Kitchen
- 1980 Food, Wine & Friends
- 1994 The Gourmet Vegetarian
- 1996 Carrier's Caribbean, BBC2 12-part series

== Bibliography ==
- Robert Carrier, Great Dishes of the World, with drawings by Sophie Granval, (London: Thomas Nelson and Sons, 1963)
- Robert Carrier, The Robert Carrier Cookbook, (London: Nelson, 1965)
- Robert Carrier, The Connoisseur's Cookbook, (London: Random House, c 1965)
- Robert Carrier, Great Dishes of the World, (London: Sphere, 1967) ISBN 0-7221-2357-4
- Robert Carrier, Cooking for you, (London: Hamlyn, 1973) ISBN 0-600-37541-2
- Robert Carrier, The Robert Carrier Cookery Course, (London: W. H. Allen & Co, 1974) ISBN 0-491-01192-X
- Robert Carrier, Great Desserts and Pastries, (London: Hamlyn, 1978) ISBN 0-600-32014-6
- Robert Carrier, Food, Wine & Friends, (London: Sidgwick & Jackson, 1980) ISBN 0-283-98555-0
- Robert Carrier (ed.), Robert Carrier's Kitchen, (London: Marshall Cavendish, 1981–1983) magazine partwork
- Robert Carrier, Robert Carrier's Entertaining, (1982)
- Robert Carrier, Robert Carrier's Quick Cook, (London: Hamlyn, 1984) ISBN 0-600-32232-7
- Robert Carrier, Cooking With Carrier, (London: Galahad Books, 1984) ISBN 0-89479-059-5
- Robert Carrier, Robert Carrier's Kitchen – Making the most of Lamb & Pork, (London: Marshall Cavendish, 1985) ISBN 0-86307-264-X
- Robert Carrier, A Taste of Morocco, (London: Crown Publishing, 1987) ISBN 0-517-56559-5
- Robert Carrier, Robert Carrier's Menu Planner, (London: Little Brown, 1988) ISBN 0-316-12977-1
- Robert Carrier, Feasts of Provence, (London: Rizzoli International Publications, 1993) ISBN 0-8478-1661-3
- Robert Carrier, The Best of Robert Carrier, (London: Bloomsbury, 1994) ISBN 0-7475-1980-3
- Robert Carrier, The Gourmet Vegetarian, (London: Boxtree, 1994) ISBN 1-85283-952-X
- Robert Carrier, Carrier's Kitchen, (London: Boxtree, 1995) ISBN 0-7522-1032-7
- Robert Carrier, Robert Carrier's Cookery Cards: Classic Carrier, (London: Boxtree, 1995) ISBN 0-7522-1002-5
- Robert Carrier, Robert Carrier's Cookery Cards: Carrier Entertains, (London: Boxtree, 1995) ISBN 0-7522-1076-9
- Robert Carrier, A Million Family Menus, (London: World Publications, 1996) ISBN 1-57215-194-3
- Robert Carrier, new Great Dishes of the world, (London: Boxtree, 1997) ISBN 0 7522 1059 9
- Robert Carrier, Great Dishes of Spain, (London: Boxtree, 1999) ISBN 0-7522-2492-1
