= Robert Francis Peel =

English soldier, Conservative politician and Governor of Saint Helena

Colonel Robert Francis Peel CMG

Governor of Saint Helena
- In office August 1920 – August 1924

Member of Parliament for Woodbridge
- In office January 1910 – July 1920

Personal details
- Born: 30 April 1874
- Died: 10 August 1924 (aged 50)
- Relations: Great-nephew of Sir Robert Peel

Military service
- Allegiance: United Kingdom
- Branch/service: British Army
- Years of service: 1898–1919
- Rank: Colonel
- Unit: Coldstream Guards (1899–1909); East Surrey Regiment (1909–1919)
- Battles/wars: Second Boer War; First World War
- Awards: Companion of the Order of St Michael and St George

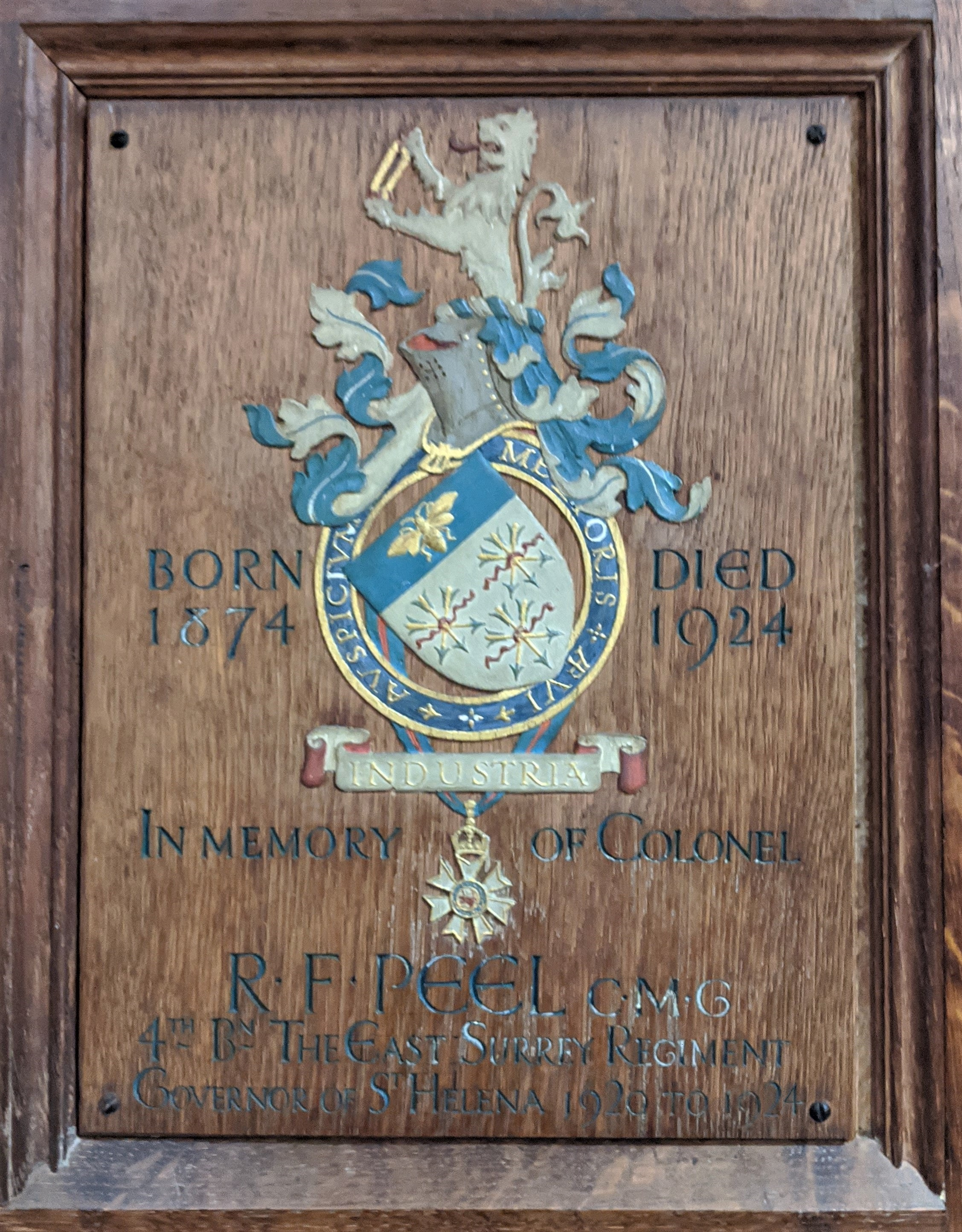
Memorial plaque to Peel in All Saints Church, Kingston upon Thames

Robert Francis Peel CMG (30 April 1874 – 10 August 1924) was an English soldier, Conservative politician and Governor of Saint Helena from 1920 until his death in 1924.

He was the grandson of William Yates Peel, great-grandson of Sir Robert Peel and a great-nephew of Prime Minister Sir Robert Peel. He attended Harrow School.

Peel was commissioned as a second lieutenant in the Coldstream Guards on 2 February 1898, and promoted to lieutenant on 1 April 1899. He served with the 1st battalion of the regiment in South Africa during the Second Boer War, and returned with his regiment in July 1902, following the end of the war. He was promoted captain in 1906. After retiring from the regular army in 1909, he was commissioned Major in the part-time 4th (Special Reserve) Battalion, the East Surrey Regiment, becoming a Lieutenant Colonel in March 1913. He continued to serve during the First World War, gaining the rank of brevet Colonel.

In 1903, Peel married Alice Charlton-Meyrick, daughter of Sir Thomas Charlton-Meyrick.

After failing to get elected for Mid Northamptonshire in the 1906 general election, Peel served as Member of Parliament for Woodbridge, Suffolk from January 1910. In July 1920, he resigned his seat to become Governor and Commander-in-Chief of St Helena. In June 1922 he was appointed a companion of the Order of St Michael and St George. He continued to serve as governor until his death on 10 August 1924.

There is a memorial plaque to Peel in the East Surrey Regimental Chapel in All Saints Church, Kingston upon Thames, Surrey.

Parliament of the United Kingdom
Preceded by Robert Lacey Everett	Member of Parliament for Woodbridge; January 1910 – July 1920	Succeeded by Sir Arthur Churchman, Bt

Preceded by Major Sir Harry Cordeaux	Governor of Saint Helena; 1920 – 1925	Succeeded by Lieutenant-Colonel Harold Iremonger
