= Robert Lacey Everett =

English farmer and Liberal politician

RL Everett election card

Robert Lacey Everett (28 January 1833 – 21 October 1916) was an English farmer and Liberal politician who sat in the House of Commons three times between 1885 and 1910.

== Life ==
Everett was born at Rushmere St Andrew, Suffolk, the son of Joseph David Everett and his wife Elizabeth Garwood. He became a yeoman farmer of 375 acres (1.52 km^{2}).

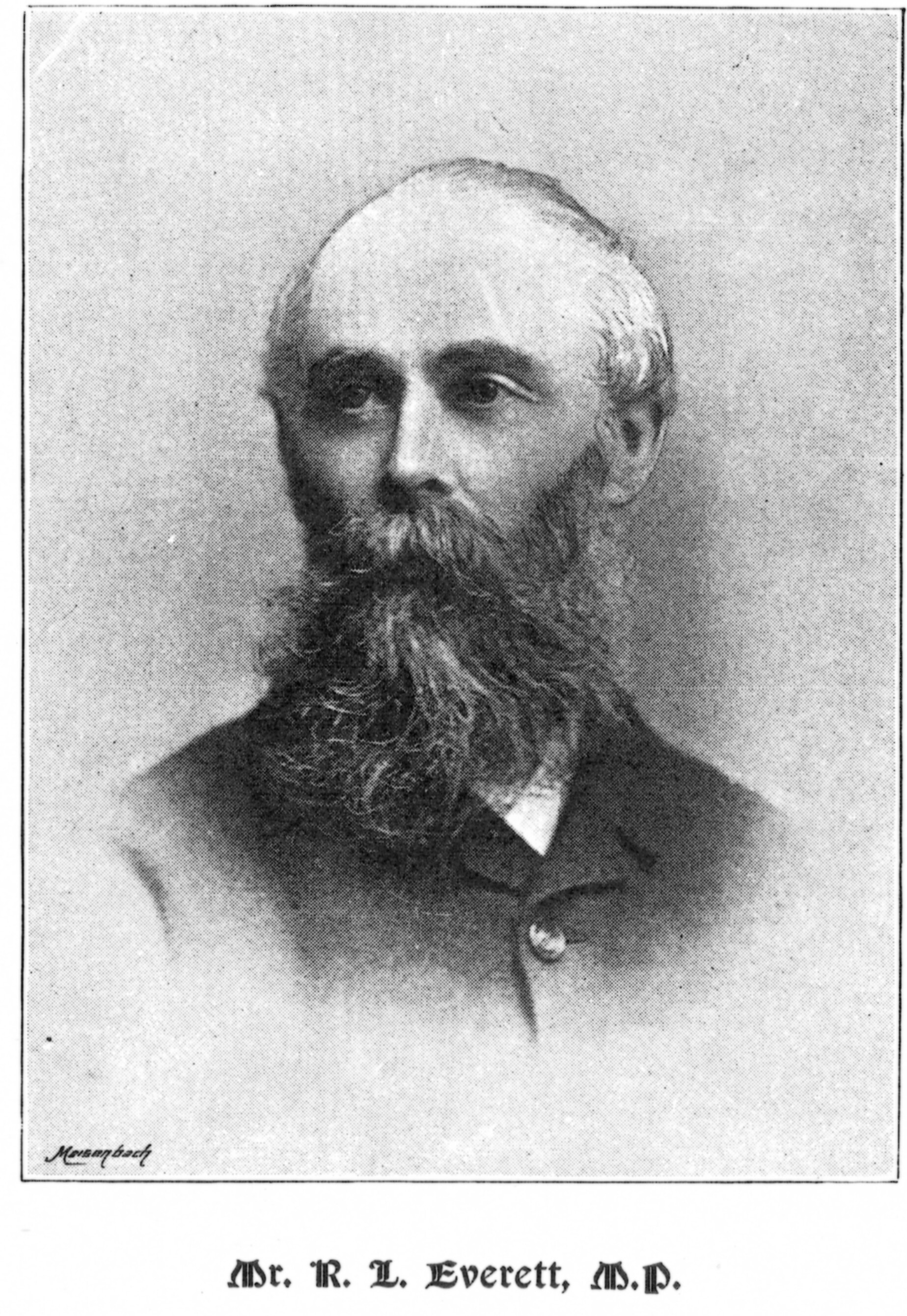
Pictured in Suffolk Celebrities, 1893

In 1880 Everett stood unsuccessfully for Parliament at East Suffolk as a farmers' candidate. He was elected as Member of Parliament (MP) for Woodbridge at the 1885 general election but lost the seat in 1886. He was elected again in 1892, but lost in 1895. He won the seat for the third time in 1906 but did not seek re-election in January 1910.

Everett died at the age of 83.

Everett married in 1863, Elizabeth Nussey, daughter of Obadiah Nussey of Leeds, a cloth merchant, and manufacturer.

== Publications ==
- Why the Malt Tax should be repealed, [1865?].
- Tithes: their history, use and future, 1887.
- Y Degwm: ei hanes, ei ddefnyddiad a'i ddyfodol [translation into Welsh of Tithes ...], 1887.
- Agricultural distress: a cause and a remedy, 1893.
- The real cause of agricultural distress, 1895.

== Sources ==
- Lees, Charles Herbert (1912). "Everett, Joseph David" . In Lee, Sidney (ed.). Dictionary of National Biography (2nd supplement). London: Smith, Elder & Co.
- C. H. Lees, rev. Graeme J. N. Gooday. "Everett, Joseph David (1831–1904)". Oxford Dictionary of National Biography (online ed.). Oxford University Press. doi:10.1093/ref:odnb/33049. (Subscription or UK public library membership required.)

Parliament of the United Kingdom
New constituency before: see East Suffolk	Member of Parliament for Woodbridge; 1885 – 1886	Succeeded by Robert Hamilton Lloyd-Anstruther
Preceded by Robert Hamilton Lloyd-Anstruther	Member of Parliament for Woodbridge; 1892 – 1895	Succeeded by E. G. Pretyman
Preceded by E. G. Pretyman	Member of Parliament for Woodbridge; 1906 – January 1910	Succeeded by Robert Francis Peel
