= James Stevenson (Glasgow Camlachie MP) =

British politician (1883–1963)

James Stevenson, Lord Stevenson, OBE (2 March 1883 – 3 March 1963) was a Scottish lawyer, politician, and judge. He was Member of Parliament for Glasgow Camlachie from 1931 to 1935 and a Senator of the College of Justice for Scotland from 1936 to 1948.

Parliament of the United Kingdom
Preceded by Campbell Stephen	Member of Parliament for Glasgow Camlachie; 1931–1935	Succeeded by Campbell Stephen
