= Woodbridge (constituency) =

Parliamentary constituency in the United Kingdom, 1885–1950

- Former county constituency for the House of Commons
- County: Suffolk
- Major settlements: Woodbridge, Felixstowe

1885–1950
- Seats: One
- Created from: East Suffolk
- Replaced by: Sudbury and Woodbridge and Eye

Woodbridge was a county constituency centred on the town of Woodbridge in Suffolk. It returned one Member of Parliament (MP) to the House of Commons of the Parliament of the United Kingdom.

== History ==
The South-Eastern or Woodbridge Division was one of five single-member county divisions of the Parliamentary County of Suffolk created by the Redistribution of Seats Act 1885 to replace the existing two 2-member divisions for the 1885 general election. It was formed from parts of the Eastern Division of Suffolk. It was abolished under the Representation of the People Act 1948 for the 1950 general election when it was largely replaced by the new Sudbury and Woodbridge constituency.

== Boundaries and boundary changes ==
=== 1885–1918 ===
- The Municipal Borough of Woodbridge;
- The Sessional Divisions of Bosmere and Claydon, Samford, and Woodbridge; and
- The Corporate Town of Aldeburgh.

=== 1918–1950 ===
- The Municipal Borough of Aldeburgh;
- The Urban Districts of Felixstowe and Woodbridge:
- The Rural Districts of Bosmere and Claydon, Samford, and Woodbridge; and
- Part of the Rural District of Plomesgate.

Lost areas which had been annexed by the County Borough of Ipswich to the Parliamentary Borough thereof.

On abolition, southern parts, which comprised the majority of the seat, including Felixstowe and Woodbridge, formed part of the new county constituency of Sudbury and Woodbridge. Northern parts, including Aldeburgh, were transferred to Eye.

== Members of Parliament ==
Election	Member	Party
1885	Robert Lacey Everett	Liberal
1886	Robert Hamilton Lloyd-Anstruther	Conservative
1892	Robert Lacey Everett	Liberal
1895	E. G. Pretyman	Conservative
1906	Robert Lacey Everett	Liberal
Jan. 1910	Robert Francis Peel	Conservative
1920	Sir Arthur Churchman, Bt	Conservative
1929	Clavering Fison	Conservative
1931	Walter Ross-Taylor	Conservative
1945	Hon. John Hare	Conservative
1950	constituency abolished: see Sudbury and Woodbridge	

== Elections ==
=== Elections in the 1880s ===
General election 1885: Woodbridge
Party	Candidate	Votes	%	±%
Liberal	Robert Everett	4,978	50.9	
Conservative	Frederick Thellusson	4,810	49.1	
Majority		168	1.8	
Turnout		9,788	80.7	
Registered electors		12,126		
Liberal win (new seat)				

General election 1886: Woodbridge
Party	Candidate	Votes	%	±%
Conservative	Robert Lloyd-Anstruther	4,854	51.7	+2.6
Liberal	Robert Everett	4,541	48.3	−2.6
Majority		313	3.4	N/A
Turnout		9,395	77.5	−3.2
Registered electors		12,126		
Conservative gain from Liberal		Swing	+2.6	

=== Elections in the 1890s ===
General election 1892: Woodbridge
Party	Candidate	Votes	%	±%
Liberal	Robert Everett	5,223	53.8	+5.5
Conservative	Robert Lloyd-Anstruther	4,485	46.2	−5.5
Majority		738	7.6	N/A
Turnout		9,708	82.1	+4.6
Registered electors		11,823		
Liberal gain from Conservative		Swing	+5.5	

General election 1895: Woodbridge
Party	Candidate	Votes	%	±%
Conservative	E. G. Pretyman	5,410	53.1	+6.9
Liberal	Robert Everett	4,778	46.9	−6.9
Majority		632	6.2	N/A
Turnout		10,188	84.5	+2.4
Registered electors		12,053		
Conservative gain from Liberal		Swing	+6.9	

=== Elections in the 1900s ===
E.G. Pretyman

General election 1900: Woodbridge
Party	Candidate	Votes	%	±%
Conservative	E. G. Pretyman	5,089	53.4	+0.3
Liberal	Robert Everett	4,437	46.6	−0.3
Majority		652	6.8	+0.6
Turnout		9,526	78.9	−5.6
Registered electors		12,077		
Conservative hold		Swing	+0.3	

By-election, 1900: Woodbridge
Party	Candidate	Votes	%	±%
Conservative	E. G. Pretyman	Unopposed		
Conservative hold				

General election 1906: Woodbridge
Party	Candidate	Votes	%	±%
Liberal	Robert Everett	5,527	50.8	+4.2
Conservative	E. G. Pretyman	5,348	49.2	−4.2
Majority		179	1.6	N/A
Turnout		10,875	86.8	+7.9
Registered electors		12,528		
Liberal gain from Conservative		Swing	+4.2	

=== Elections in the 1910s ===
General election January 1910: Woodbridge
Party	Candidate	Votes	%	±%
Conservative	Robert Peel	6,120	53.9	+4.7
Liberal	Charles Sydney Buxton	5,226	46.1	−4.7
Majority		894	7.8	N/A
Turnout		11,346	88.6	+1.8
Registered electors		12,808		
Conservative gain from Liberal		Swing	+4.7	

General election December 1910: Woodbridge
Party	Candidate	Votes	%	±%
Conservative	Robert Peel	5,704	52.6	−1.3
Liberal	William Elliston	5,144	47.4	+1.3
Majority		560	5.2	−2.6
Turnout		10,848	84.7	−3.9
Registered electors		12,808		
Conservative hold		Swing	−1.3	

General Election 1914–15:

Another General Election was required to take place before the end of 1915. The political parties had been making preparations for an election to take place and by July 1914, the following candidates had been selected;

- Unionist: Robert Peel
- Liberal: William Elliston

Robert Peel

General election 1918: Woodbridge
Party		Candidate	Votes	%	±%
C	Unionist	Robert Peel	8,654	55.8	+3.2
	Liberal	William Elliston	6,842	44.2	−3.2
Majority			1,812	11.6	+6.4
Turnout			15,496	51.0	−33.7
	Unionist hold		Swing	+3.2	
C indicates candidate endorsed by the coalition government.

=== Elections in the 1920s ===
1920 Woodbridge by-election
Party		Candidate	Votes	%	±%
C	Unionist	Arthur Churchman	9,898	53.2	−2.6
	Labour	Henry Harben	8,707	46.8	New
Majority			1,191	6.4	−5.2
Turnout			18,605	61.4	+10.4
	Unionist hold		Swing		
C indicates candidate endorsed by the coalition government.

General election 1922: Woodbridge
Party	Candidate	Votes	%	±%
Unionist	Arthur Churchman	12,396	56.7	+3.5
Labour	E. J. C. Neep	9,476	43.3	−3.5
Majority		2,920	13.4	+7.0
Turnout		21,872	69.1	+7.7
Unionist hold		Swing	+3.4	

General election 1923: Woodbridge
Party	Candidate	Votes	%	±%
Unionist	Arthur Churchman	10,606	46.7	−10.0
Liberal	William Elliston	7,328	32.2	New
Labour	E. J. C. Neep	4,810	21.1	−22.2
Majority		3,278	14.5	+1.1
Turnout		22,744	70.9	+1.8
Unionist hold		Swing		

General election 1924: Woodbridge
Party	Candidate	Votes	%	±%
Unionist	Arthur Churchman	13,419	54.9	+8.2
Liberal	William Elliston	7,008	28.7	−3.5
Labour	Sylvain Mayer	3,998	16.4	−4.7
Majority		6,411	26.2	+11.7
Turnout		24,425	74.3	+3.4
Unionist hold		Swing	+5.8	

General election 1929: Woodbridge
Party	Candidate	Votes	%	±%
Unionist	Clavering Fison	15,231	48.1	−6.8
Liberal	Roger Fulford	10,904	34.5	+5.8
Labour	Leonard Spero	5,507	17.4	+1.0
Majority		4,327	13.6	−12.6
Turnout		31,642	73.3	−1.0
Unionist hold		Swing	-6.3	

=== Elections in the 1930s ===
General election 1931: Woodbridge
Party	Candidate	Votes	%	±%
Conservative	Walter Ross-Taylor	25,654	81.3	+33.2
Labour	Ida Mary Nussey Keeble	5,885	18.7	+1.3
Majority		19,769	62.6	+49.0
Turnout		31,539	70.6	−2.7
Conservative hold		Swing		

General election 1935: Woodbridge
Party	Candidate	Votes	%	±%
Conservative	Walter Ross-Taylor	22,715	72.1	−9.2
Labour	A V Smith	8,808	27.9	+9.2
Majority		13,907	44.2	−18.4
Turnout		31,523	67.5	+4.9
Conservative hold		Swing	-9.2	

General Election 1939–40:

Another General Election was required to take place before the end of 1940. The political parties had been making preparations for an election to take place and by the Autumn of 1939, the following candidates had been selected;

- Conservative: John Hare
- Liberal: Douglas B Law
- Labour: J M Stewart

=== Elections in the 1940s ===
General election 1945: Woodbridge
Party	Candidate	Votes	%	±%
Conservative	John Hare	16,073	47.0	−25.1
Labour	John M. Stewart	11,380	33.3	+5.4
Liberal	Douglas Burch Law	6,740	19.7	New
Majority		4,693	13.7	−30.5
Turnout		34,193	71.4	+3.9
Conservative hold		Swing		

== Sources ==
- Leigh Rayment's Historical List of MPs – Constituencies beginning with "W" (part 5)
- Craig, F. W. S. (1989) [1974]. British parliamentary election results 1885–1918 (2nd ed.). Chichester: Parliamentary Research Services. p. 395. ISBN 0-900178-27-2.
- Craig, F. W. S. (1983) [1969]. British parliamentary election results 1918–1949 (3rd ed.). Chichester: Parliamentary Research Services. p. 469. ISBN 0-900178-06-X.
