= Churchman baronets =

Baronetcies created for the Churchman family

There have been two baronetcies created for members of the Churchman family, both in the Baronetage of the United Kingdom. Both creations are extinct.

The Churchman Baronetcy, of Abbey Oaks in the parish of Sproughton in the County of Suffolk, was created in the Baronetage of the United Kingdom on 3 July 1917. For more information on this creation, see Arthur Churchman, 1st Baron Woodbridge. Both the Baronetcy and Barony became extinct on the death of the 1st Baron in 1949.

The Churchman Baronetcy, of Melton in the County of Suffolk, was created in the Baronetage of the United Kingdom on 29 June 1938 for the tobacco manufacturer and public servant Sir William Churchman. He was the elder brother of the first Baronet of the 1917 creation. The title became extinct on his death in 1947.

== Churchman baronets, of Abbey Oaks (1917) ==
- see Arthur Churchman, 1st Baron Woodbridge (1867–1949)

== Churchman baronets, of Melton (1938) ==
- Sir William Alfred Churchman, 1st Baronet (1864–1947)
