= Arthur Churchman, 1st Baron Woodbridge =

British tobacco manufacturer, soldier and Conservative politician

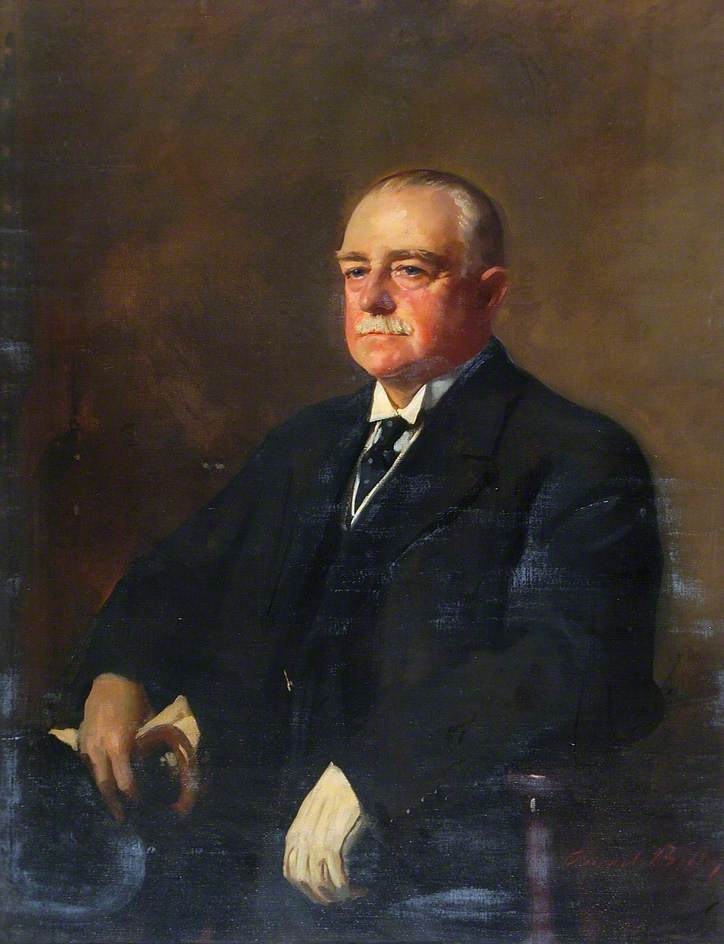
- Sir Arthur Churchman in 1929, by Oswald Birley

Member of Parliament for Woodbridge
- In office 28 July 1920 – 10 May 1929
- Preceded by: Robert Francis Peel
- Succeeded by: Clavering Fison

Personal details
- Born: 7 September 1867
- Died: 3 February 1949 (aged 81)
- Party: Conservative

Lieutenant-Colonel Arthur Charles Churchman, 1st Baron Woodbridge, DL (7 September 1867 – 3 February 1949), known as Sir Arthur Churchman, Bt, between 1917 and 1932, was a British tobacco manufacturer, soldier and Conservative politician.

== Background and education ==
Churchman was the son of Henry Charles Churchman, of Paget House, Ipswich, Suffolk, by Mary Anna Eade, daughter of Charles Eade. Sir William Churchman, 1st Baronet, was his elder brother. He was educated at Ipswich School.

== Business and political career ==
Churchman went into partnership with his brother, William, in the family tobacco firm which had been founded by their great-grandfather in 1790. This was renamed W.A. & A.C. Churchman. It was later absorbed by the tobacco combines and Churchman became vice-chairman of the British American Tobacco Company.

Churchman was elected Mayor of Ipswich in 1901, a post he held until the following year (his brother William had been mayor between 1899 and 1900). He was lieutenant-colonel of the Essex and Suffolk Royal Garrison Artillery between 1905 and 1909 and commanded a Territorial Force Battalion of the Suffolk Regiment as a temporary lieutenant-colonel in the First World War. In 1917, he was created a baronet, of Abbey Oaks in the Parish of Sproughton in the County of Suffolk. In 1920, he was returned to Parliament for Woodbridge, which he remained until 1929. He was appointed a Deputy Lieutenant of Suffolk in 1930 and served as High Sheriff of the county in 1931. In 1932, he was raised to the peerage as Baron Woodbridge, of Ipswich in the County of Suffolk. Between 1932 and 1949, he was High Steward of Ipswich.

A major benefaction of his was to purchase Orford Castle for preservation in 1928.

== Family ==
Lord Woodbridge married Edith Harvey, daughter of J. A. Harvey, in 1891. They had three sons and two daughters, all of whom but one daughter predeceased him. Woodbridge died in February 1949, aged 81, when the baronetcy and barony became extinct.

Parliament of the United Kingdom
Preceded by Robert Francis Peel	Member of Parliament for Woodbridge; 1920–1929	Succeeded by Clavering Fison
Baronetage of the United Kingdom
New creation	Baronet (of Abbey Oakes); 1917–1949	Extinct
Peerage of the United Kingdom
New creation	Baron Woodbridge; 1932–1949	Extinct
