= E. J. C. Neep =

Edward John Cecil Neep (13 October 1900 – 3 October 1980) was a British barrister and frequent political candidate.

Born in Southwark, Neep was educated at Westminster School. He initially worked as a chemist, but from 1920 as a journalist, and then in 1923 became a barrister with the Middle Temple.

Neep was a supporter of the Labour Party and stood in numerous elections, never winning a Parliamentary seat. His first contest was in Woodbridge at the 1922 United Kingdom general election, where he took 43.3% of the vote. He stood in the seat again in 1923, but his vote share fell to only 21.1%, and he dropped to third place. At the 1924 United Kingdom general election, he instead stood in Leeds Central, managing 40.4% of the vote. His final contest was Lowestoft at the 1931 United Kingdom general election, where he won 32.3% of the votes cast.

During the 1930s and 1940s, Neep focused on his career as a barrister, and wrote several books, including A Handbook of Church Law, and Gladstone: a spectrum. He became a King's Counsel in 1946, and in 1952 became deputy speaker of the Legislative Council of Kenya.

== Works ==
- Horatio Nelson (1930), with George Edinger
