= Cross baronets =

Set index for Cross baronets

There have been two baronetcies created for persons with the surname Cross, both in the Baronetage of the United Kingdom. Both creations are extinct.

- Cross baronets of Marchbank Wood and the City of Glasgow (1912)
- Cross baronets of Bolton-le-Moors (1941): see Sir Ronald Hibbert Cross, 1st Baronet (1896–1968)
