= Results of the 2001 United Kingdom general election =

== Results by parliamentary constituency ==
The results of the 2001 United Kingdom general election, by parliamentary constituency were as follows:

Constituency	Cnty	Rgn	Last elctn	Winning party				Turnout (Note: Excludes spoilt ballots)	Votes												
Constituency	Cnty	Rgn	Last elctn	Party	Votes	Share	Majrty	Turnout	Lab (Note: Excludes Speaker) (Note: Includes Labour Party and allied Co-operative Party)	Con	LD	SNP	UKIP	UUP	PC	DUP	SF	SDLP	Grn (Note: Includes Green Party of England and Wales, Scottish Green Party and Green Party in Northern Ireland)	Other (Note: Includes all other parties, all independent candidates and the Speaker)	Total
Aberavon	WGM	WLS	Lab	Lab	19,063	63.1%	16,108	61.0%	19,063	2,296	2,933				2,955					2,943	30,190
Aberdeen Central	SCT	SCT	Lab	Lab	12,025	45.5%	6,646	52.7%	12,025	3,761	4,547	5,379								717	26,429
Aberdeen North	SCT	SCT	Lab	Lab	13,157	43.3%	4,449	43.3%	13,157	3,047	4,991	8,708								454	30,357
Aberdeen South	SCT	SCT	Lab	Lab	14,696	39.8%	4,388	62.5%	14,696	7,098	10,308	4,293								495	36,890
Airdrie and Shotts	SCT	SCT	Lab	Lab	18,478	58.2%	12,340	54.4%	18,478	1,960	2,376	6,138								2,784	31,736
Aldershot	HAM	SE	Con	Con	19,106	42.2%	6,594	57.9%	11,394	19,106	12,512		797						630	849	45,288
Aldridge-Brownhills	WMD	WM	Con	Con	18,974	50.2%	3,768	60.6%	15,206	18,974	3,251									379	37,810
Altrincham and Sale West	GTM	NW	Con	Con	20,113	46.2%	2,941	60.3%	17,172	20,113	6,283										43,568
Alyn and Deeside	CON	WLS	Lab	Lab	18,525	52.3%	9,222	58.6%	18,525	9,303	4,585		481		1,182				881	464	35,421
Amber Valley	DBY	EM	Lab	Lab	23,101	51.9%	7,227	60.3%	23,101	15,874	5,538										44,513
Angus	SCT	SCT	SNP	SNP	12,347	35.3%	3,611	59.3%	8,183	8,736	5,015	12,347								732	35,013
Argyll and Bute	SCT	SCT	LD	LD	9,245	29.9%	1,653	63.0%	7,592	6,436	9,245	6,433								1,251	30,957
Arundel and South Downs	WSX	SE	Con	Con	23,969	52.2%	13,704	64.7%	9,488	23,969	10,265		2,167								45,889
Ashfield	NTT	EM	Lab	Lab	22,875	58.1%	13,268	53.6%	22,875	9,607	4,428									2,440	39,350
Ashford	KEN	SE	Con	Con	22,739	47.4%	7,359	62.5%	15,380	22,739	7,236		1,229						1,353		47,937
Ashton-under-Lyne	GTM	NW	Lab	Lab	22,340	62.5%	15,518	49.1%	22,340	6,822	4,237								748	1,617	35,764
Aylesbury	BKM	SE	Con	Con	23,230	47.3%	10,009	61.4%	11,388	23,230	13,221		1,248								49,087
Ayr	SCT	SCT	Lab	Lab	16,801	43.6%	2,545	69.3%	16,801	14,256	2,089	4,621	101							692	38,560
Banbury	OXF	SE	Con	Con	23,271	45.2%	5,219	61.1%	18,052	23,271	8,216		695						1,281		51,515
Banff and Buchan	SCT	SCT	SNP	SNP	16,710	54.2%	10,503	54.4%	4,363	6,207	2,769	16,710	310							447	30,806
Barking	LND	LND	Lab	Lab	15,302	60.9%	9,534	45.5%	15,302	5,768	2,450									1,606	25,126
Barnsley Central	SYK	YTH	Lab	Lab	19,181	69.6%	15,130	45.8%	19,181	3,608	4,051									703	27,543
Barnsley East and Mexborough	SYK	YTH	Lab	Lab	21,945	67.5%	16,789	49.5%	21,945	4,024	5,156		662							722	32,509
Barnsley West and Penistone	SYK	YTH	Lab	Lab	20,244	58.6%	12,352	52.9%	20,244	7,892	6,428										34,564
Barrow and Furness	CMA	NW	Lab	Lab	21,724	55.7%	9,889	60.3%	21,724	11,835	4,750		711								39,020
Basildon	ESS	E	Lab	Lab	21,551	52.7%	7,738	55.1%	21,551	13,813	3,691		1,397							423	40,875
Basingstoke	HAM	SE	Con	Con	20,490	42.7%	880	60.7%	19,610	20,490	6,693		1,202								47,995
Bassetlaw	NTT	EM	Lab	Lab	21,506	55.3%	9,748	56.8%	21,506	11,758	4,942									689	38,895
Bath	AVN	SW	LD	LD	23,372	50.5%	9,894	64.9%	7,269	13,478	23,372		708						1,469		46,296
Batley and Spen	WYK	YTH	Lab	Lab	19,224	49.9%	5,064	60.5%	19,224	14,160	3,989		574						595		38,542
Battersea	LND	LND	Lab	Lab	18,498	50.3%	5,053	54.5%	18,498	13,445	4,450									411	36,804
Beaconsfield	BKM	SE	Con	Con	22,233	52.8%	13,065	60.8%	9,168	22,233	9,117		1,626								42,144
Beckenham	LND	LND	Con	Con	20,618	45.3%	4,959	62.6%	15,659	20,618	7,308		782						961	234	45,562
Bedford	BDF	E	Lab	Lab	19,454	47.9%	6,157	59.9%	19,454	13,297	6,425		430							973	40,579
Belfast East	NIR	NIR	DUP	DUP	15,667	42.5%	7,117	63.0%		800				8,550		15,667	1,237	880		9,695	36,829
Belfast North	NIR	NIR	UUP	DUP	16,718	40.8%	6,387	67.2%						4,904		16,718	10,331	8,592		387	40,932
Belfast South	NIR	NIR	UUP	UUP	17,008	44.8%	5,399	63.9%						17,008			2,894	11,609		6,441	37,952
Belfast West	NIR	NIR	SF	SF	27,096	66.1%	19,342	68.7%						2,541		2,641	27,096	7,754		950	40,982
Berwick-upon-Tweed	NBL	NE	LD	LD	18,651	51.4%	8,458	63.8%	6,435	10,193	18,651		1,029								36,308
Bethnal Green and Bow	LND	LND	Lab	Lab	19,380	50.5%	10,057	50.2%	19,380	9,323	5,946								1,666	2,099	38,414
Beverley and Holderness	HUM	YTH	Con	Con	19,168	41.3%	781	62.0%	18,387	19,168	7,356		1,464								46,375
Bexhill and Battle	SXE	SE	Con	Con	21,555	48.1%	10,503	64.9%	8,702	21,555	11,052		3,474								44,783
Bexleyheath and Crayford	LND	LND	Lab	Lab	17,593	43.6%	1,472	63.5%	17,593	16,121	4,476		780							1,408	40,378
Billericay	ESS	E	Con	Con	21,608	47.4%	5,013	58.1%	16,595	21,608	6,323		1,072								45,598
Birkenhead	MSY	NW	Lab	Lab	20,418	70.5%	15,591	48.3%	20,418	4,827	3,722										28,967
Birmingham Edgbaston	WMD	WM	Lab	Lab	18,517	49.1%	4,698	56.0%	18,517	13,819	4,528									885	37,749
Birmingham Erdington	WMD	WM	Lab	Lab	17,375	56.8%	9,962	46.6%	17,375	7,413	3,602		521							1,693	30,604
Birmingham Hall Green	WMD	WM	Lab	Lab	18,049	54.6%	6,648	57.5%	18,049	11,401	2,926		708								33,084
Birmingham Hodge Hill	WMD	WM	Lab	Lab	16,901	63.9%	11,618	47.9%	16,901	5,283	2,147		275							1,859	26,465
Birmingham Ladywood	WMD	WM	Lab	Lab	21,694	68.9%	18,143	44.3%	21,694	3,551	2,586		283							3,379	31,493
Birmingham Northfield	WMD	WM	Lab	Lab	16,528	56.0%	7,798	52.8%	16,528	8,730	3,322		550							404	29,534
Birmingham Perry Barr	WMD	WM	Lab	Lab	17,415	46.5%	8,753	52.6%	17,415	8,662	8,566		352							2,422	37,417
Birmingham Selly Oak	WMD	WM	Lab	Lab	21,015	52.4%	10,339	56.3%	21,015	10,676	6,532		568						1,309		40,100
Birmingham Sparkbrook and Small Heath	WMD	WM	Lab	Lab	21,087	57.5%	16,246	49.3%	21,087	3,948	4,841		634							6,137	36,647
Birmingham Yardley	WMD	WM	Lab	Lab	14,085	46.9%	2,578	57.2%	14,085	3,941	11,507		329							151	30,013
Bishop Auckland	DUR	NE	Lab	Lab	22,680	58.8%	13,926	57.2%	22,680	8,754	6,073								1,052		38,559
Blaby	LEI	EM	Con	Con	22,104	46.4%	6,209	64.5%	15,895	22,104	8,286									1,357	47,642
Blackburn	LAN	NW	Lab	Lab	21,808	54.1%	9,249	55.5%	21,808	12,559	3,264		1,185							1,468	40,284
Blackpool North and Fleetwood	LAN	NW	Lab	Lab	21,610	50.8%	5,721	57.2%	21,610	15,889	4,132		950								42,581
Blackpool South	LAN	NW	Lab	Lab	21,060	54.3%	8,262	52.2%	21,060	12,798	4,115		819								38,792
Blaenau Gwent	GNT	WLS	Lab	Lab	22,855	72.0%	19,313	59.5%	22,855	2,383	2,945				3,542						31,725
Blaydon	TWR	NE	Lab	Lab	20,340	54.8%	7,809	57.4%	20,340	4,215	12,531										37,086
Blyth Valley	NBL	NE	Lab	Lab	20,627	59.7%	12,188	54.7%	20,627	5,484	8,439										34,550
Bognor Regis and Littlehampton	WSX	SE	Con	Con	17,602	45.2%	5,643	58.2%	11,959	17,602	6,846		1,779						782		38,968
Bolsover	DBY	EM	Lab	Lab	26,249	68.6%	18,777	56.5%	26,249	7,472	4,550										38,271
Bolton North East	GTM	NW	Lab	Lab	21,166	54.3%	8,422	56.0%	21,166	12,744	4,004								629	407	38,950
Bolton South East	GTM	NW	Lab	Lab	21,129	61.9%	12,871	50.1%	21,129	8,258	3,941									826	34,154
Bolton West	GTM	NW	Lab	Lab	19,381	47.0%	5,518	62.4%	19,381	13,863	7,573									397	41,214
Bootle	MSY	NW	Lab	Lab	21,400	77.6%	19,043	49.8%	21,400	2,194	2,357									1,643	27,594
Boston and Skegness	LIN	EM	Con	Con	17,298	42.9%	515	58.4%	16,783	17,298	4,994		717						521		40,313
Bosworth	LEI	EM	Con	Con	20,030	44.4%	2,280	64.4%	17,750	20,030	7,326										45,106
Bournemouth East	DOR	SW	Con	Con	15,501	43.3%	3,434	58.2%	7,107	15,501	12,067		1,124								35,799
Bournemouth West	DOR	SW	Con	Con	14,417	42.8%	4,718	53.2%	9,699	14,417	8,468		1,064								33,648
Bracknell	BRK	SE	Con	Con	22,962	46.6%	6,713	60.7%	16,249	22,962	8,424		1,266							324	49,225
Bradford North	WYK	YTH	Lab	Lab	17,419	49.7%	8,969	52.7%	17,419	8,450	6,924								611	1,613	35,017
Bradford South	WYK	YTH	Lab	Lab	19,603	55.8%	9,662	51.3%	19,603	9,941	3,717		783							1,093	35,137
Bradford West	WYK	YTH	Lab	Lab	18,401	48.0%	4,165	53.6%	18,401	14,236	2,437		427						2,672	197	38,370
Braintree	ESS	E	Lab	Lab	21,123	42.0%	358	63.6%	21,123	20,765	5,664		748						1,241	774	50,315
Brecon and Radnorshire	POW	WLS	LD	LD	13,824	36.8%	751	70.5%	8,024	13,073	13,824		452		1,301					842	37,516
Brent East	LND	LND	Lab	Lab	18,325	63.2%	13,047	51.9%	18,325	5,278	3,065		188						1,361	775	28,992
Brent North	LND	LND	Lab	Lab	20,149	59.4%	10,205	57.7%	20,149	9,944	3,846										33,939
Brent South	LND	LND	Lab	Lab	20,984	73.3%	17,380	51.2%	20,984	3,604	3,098									951	28,637
Brentford and Isleworth	LND	LND	Lab	Lab	23,275	52.3%	10,318	53.7%	23,275	12,957	5,994		412						1,324	552	44,514
Brentwood and Ongar	ESS	E	Con	Con	16,558	38.0%	2,821	67.3%	5,505	16,558	6,772		611							14,096	43,542
Bridgend	MGM	WLS	Lab	Lab	19,423	52.5%	10,086	60.2%	19,423	9,337	5,330				2,653					223	36,966
Bridgwater	SOM	SW	Con	Con	19,354	40.4%	4,987	64.4%	12,803	19,354	14,367		1,323								47,847
Brigg and Goole	HUM	YTH	Lab	Lab	20,066	48.9%	3,961	63.5%	20,066	16,105	3,796		688							399	41,054
Brighton Kemptown	SXE	SE	Lab	Lab	18,745	47.8%	4,922	57.6%	18,745	13,823	4,064		543						1,290	738	39,203
Brighton Pavilion	SXE	SE	Lab	Lab	19,846	48.7%	9,643	58.5%	19,846	10,203	5,348		361						3,806	1,159	40,723
Bristol East	AVN	SW	Lab	Lab	22,180	55.0%	13,392	57.4%	22,180	8,788	6,915		572						1,110	769	40,334
Bristol North West	AVN	SW	Lab	Lab	24,236	52.1%	10,887	60.4%	24,236	13,349	7,387		1,149							371	46,492
Bristol South	AVN	SW	Lab	Lab	23,299	56.9%	14,181	56.5%	23,299	9,118	6,078		496						1,233	746	40,970
Bristol West	AVN	SW	Lab	Lab	20,505	36.8%	4,426	65.6%	20,505	16,040	16,079		490						1,961	590	55,665
Bromley and Chislehurst	LND	LND	Con	Con	21,412	49.5%	9,037	64.3%	12,375	21,412	8,180		1,264								43,231
Bromsgrove	HWR	WM	Con	Con	23,640	51.7%	8,138	67.1%	15,502	23,640	5,430		1,112								45,684
Broxbourne	HRT	E	Con	Con	20,487	54.1%	8,993	55.7%	11,494	20,487	4,158		858							848	37,845
Broxtowe	NTT	EM	Lab	Lab	23,836	48.6%	5,873	66.5%	23,836	17,963	7,205										49,004
Buckingham	BKM	SE	Con	Con	24,296	53.7%	13,325	69.4%	10,971	24,296	9,037		968								45,272
Burnley	LAN	NW	Lab	Lab	18,195	49.3%	10,498	55.7%	18,195	7,697	5,975		866							4,151	36,884
Burton	STS	WM	Lab	Lab	22,783	49.0%	4,849	67.1%	22,783	17,934	4,468		984							288	46,457
Bury North	GTM	NW	Lab	Lab	22,945	51.2%	6,532	63.0%	22,945	16,413	5,430										44,788
Bury South	GTM	NW	Lab	Lab	23,406	59.2%	12,772	58.8%	23,406	10,634	5,499										39,539
Bury St Edmunds	SFK	E	Con	Con	21,850	43.5%	2,503	66.0%	19,347	21,850	6,998		831							1,231	50,257
Caernarfon	GWN	WLS	PC	PC	12,894	44.4%	3,511	62.0%	9,383	4,403	1,823		550		12,894						29,053
Caerphilly	GNT	WLS	Lab	Lab	22,597	58.5%	14,425	57.7%	22,597	4,413	3,469				8,172						38,651
Caithness, Sutherland and Easter Ross	SCT	SCT	LD	LD	9,041	36.4%	2,744	60.2%	6,297	3,513	9,041	5,273								743	24,867
Calder Valley	WYK	YTH	Lab	Lab	20,244	42.7%	3,094	63.0%	20,244	17,150	7,596		729						1,034	672	47,425
Camberwell and Peckham	LND	LND	Lab	Lab	17,473	69.6%	14,123	46.8%	17,473	2,740	3,350								805	736	25,104
Cambridge	CAM	E	Lab	Lab	19,316	45.1%	8,579	60.6%	19,316	9,829	10,737		532						1,413	1,009	42,836
Cannock Chase	STS	WM	Lab	Lab	23,049	56.1%	10,704	55.4%	23,049	12,345	5,670										41,064
Canterbury	KEN	SE	Con	Con	18,711	41.5%	2,069	60.9%	16,642	18,711	8,056		803						920		45,132
Cardiff Central	SGM	WLS	Lab	Lab	13,451	38.6%	659	58.3%	13,451	5,537	12,792		221		1,680				661	500	34,842
Cardiff North	SGM	WLS	Lab	Lab	19,845	45.9%	6,165	69.0%	19,845	13,680	6,631		613		2,471						43,240
Cardiff South and Penarth	SGM	WLS	Lab	Lab	20,094	56.2%	12,287	57.1%	20,094	7,807	4,572		501		1,983					794	35,751
Cardiff West	SGM	WLS	Lab	Lab	18,594	54.6%	11,321	58.4%	18,594	7,273	4,458		462		3,296						34,083
Carlisle	CMA	NW	Lab	Lab	17,856	51.2%	5,702	59.4%	17,856	12,154	4,076									823	34,909
Carmarthen East and Dinefwr	DFD	WLS	Lab	PC	16,130	42.4%	2,590	70.4%	13,540	4,912	2,815		656		16,130						38,053
Carmarthen West and South Pembrokeshire	DFD	WLS	Lab	Lab	15,349	41.6%	4,538	65.3%	15,349	10,811	3,248		537		6,893					78	36,916
Carrick, Cumnock and Doon Valley	SCT	SCT	Lab	Lab	22,174	55.3%	14,856	61.8%	22,174	7,318	2,932	6,258								1,425	40,107
Carshalton and Wallington	LND	LND	LD	LD	18,289	45.0%	4,547	60.3%	7,466	13,742	18,289		501						614		40,612
Castle Point	ESS	E	Lab	Con	17,738	44.6%	985	58.4%	16,753	17,738	3,116		1,273							883	39,763
Central Fife	SCT	SCT	Lab	Lab	18,310	56.3%	10,075	54.6%	18,310	2,351	2,775	8,235								841	32,512
Central Suffolk and North Ipswich	SFK	E	Con	Con	20,924	44.4%	3,469	63.5%	17,455	20,924	7,593		1,132								47,104
Ceredigion	DFD	WLS	PC	PC	13,241	38.3%	3,944	61.7%	5,338	6,730	9,297				13,241						34,606
Charnwood	LEI	EM	Con	Con	23,283	48.2%	7,739	64.4%	15,544	23,283	7,835		1,603								48,265
Chatham and Aylesford	KEN	SE	Lab	Lab	19,180	48.3%	4,340	57.0%	19,180	14,840	4,705		1,010								39,735
Cheadle	GTM	NW	Con	LD	18,477	42.4%	33	63.2%	6,086	18,444	18,477		599								43,606
Cheltenham	GLS	SW	LD	LD	19,970	47.7%	5,255	61.9%	5,041	14,715	19,970		482						735	892	41,835
Chesham and Amersham	BKM	SE	Con	Con	22,867	50.5%	11,882	64.7%	8,497	22,867	10,985		1,367						1,114	453	45,283
Chesterfield	DBY	EM	Lab	LD	21,249	47.8%	2,586	60.7%	18,663	3,613	21,249									916	44,441
Chichester	WSX	SE	Con	Con	23,320	47.0%	11,355	63.8%	10,627	23,320	11,965		2,380						1,292		49,584
Chingford and Woodford Green	LND	LND	Con	Con	17,834	48.2%	5,487	58.5%	12,347	17,834	5,739									1,062	36,982
Chipping Barnet	LND	LND	Con	Con	19,702	46.4%	2,701	60.4%	17,001	19,702	5,753										42,456
Chorley	LAN	NW	Lab	Lab	25,088	52.3%	8,444	62.2%	25,088	16,644	5,372		848								47,952
Christchurch	DOR	SW	Con	Con	27,306	55.1%	13,544	67.5%	7,506	27,306	13,762		993								49,567
Cities of London and Westminster	LND	LND	Con	Con	15,737	46.3%	4,499	47.2%	11,238	15,737	5,218		464						1,318		33,975
City of Chester	CHS	NW	Lab	Lab	21,760	48.5%	6,894	63.8%	21,760	14,866	6,589		899							763	44,877
City of Durham	DUR	NE	Lab	Lab	23,254	56.1%	13,441	59.6%	23,254	7,167	9,813		1,252								41,486
City of York	NYK	YTH	Lab	Lab	25,072	52.3%	13,779	59.0%	25,072	11,293	8,519		576						1,465	1,055	47,980
Cleethorpes	HUM	YTH	Lab	Lab	21,032	49.6%	5,620	62.0%	21,032	15,412	5,080		894								42,418
Clwyd South	CON	WLS	Lab	Lab	17,217	51.4%	8,898	62.4%	17,217	8,319	3,426		552		3,982						33,496
Clwyd West	CON	WLS	Lab	Lab	13,426	38.8%	1,115	64.1%	13,426	12,311	3,934		476		4,453						34,600
Clydebank and Milngavie	SCT	SCT	Lab	Lab	17,249	53.1%	10,724	62.5%	17,249	3,514	3,909	6,525								1,294	32,491
Clydesdale	SCT	SCT	Lab	Lab	17,822	46.6%	7,794	59.3%	17,822	5,034	4,111	10,028	253							974	38,222
Coatbridge and Chryston	SCT	SCT	Lab	Lab	19,807	65.3%	15,314	58.1%	19,807	2,171	2,293	4,493								1,547	30,311
Colchester	ESS	E	LD	LD	18,627	42.6%	5,553	56.1%	10,925	13,074	18,627		631							479	43,736
Colne Valley	WYK	YTH	Lab	Lab	18,967	40.4%	4,639	63.3%	18,967	14,328	11,694		917						1,081		46,987
Congleton	CHS	NW	Con	Con	20,872	46.3%	7,134	62.7%	13,738	20,872	9,719		754								45,083
Conwy	CON	WLS	Lab	Lab	14,366	41.8%	6,219	62.9%	14,366	8,147	5,800		388		5,665						34,366
Copeland	CMA	NW	Lab	Lab	17,991	51.8%	4,964	64.9%	17,991	13,027	3,732										34,750
Corby	NTH	EM	Lab	Lab	23,283	49.3%	5,700	65.0%	23,283	17,583	4,751		855							750	47,222
Coventry North East	WMD	WM	Lab	Lab	22,739	61.0%	15,751	50.3%	22,739	6,988	4,163									3,375	37,265
Coventry North West	WMD	WM	Lab	Lab	21,892	51.4%	10,874	55.5%	21,892	11,018	5,832		650							3,159	42,551
Coventry South	WMD	WM	Lab	Lab	20,125	50.2%	8,279	55.3%	20,125	11,846	5,672									2,453	40,096
Crawley	WSX	SE	Lab	Lab	19,488	49.3%	6,770	55.2%	19,488	12,718	5,009		1,137							1,165	39,517
Crewe and Nantwich	CHS	NW	Lab	Lab	22,556	54.3%	9,906	60.2%	22,556	12,650	5,595		746								41,547
Crosby	MSY	NW	Lab	Lab	20,327	55.1%	8,353	65.1%	20,327	11,974	4,084									481	36,866
Croydon Central	LND	LND	Lab	Lab	21,643	47.2%	3,984	59.1%	21,643	17,659	5,156		545							857	45,860
Croydon North	LND	LND	Lab	Lab	26,610	63.5%	16,858	53.2%	26,610	9,752	4,375		606							539	41,882
Croydon South	LND	LND	Con	Con	22,169	49.2%	8,697	61.4%	13,472	22,169	8,226		998							195	45,060
Cumbernauld and Kilsyth	SCT	SCT	Lab	Lab	16,144	54.4%	7,520	59.7%	16,144	1,460	1,934	8,624								1,537	29,699
Cunninghame North	SCT	SCT	Lab	Lab	15,571	46.0%	8,398	61.5%	15,571	6,666	3,060	7,173								1,346	33,816
Cunninghame South	SCT	SCT	Lab	Lab	16,424	58.4%	11,230	56.2%	16,424	2,782	2,094	5,194								1,615	28,109
Cynon Valley	MGM	WLS	Lab	Lab	17,685	65.6%	12,998	55.4%	17,685	2,045	2,541				4,687						26,958
Dagenham	LND	LND	Lab	Lab	15,784	57.2%	8,693	46.5%	15,784	7,091	2,820									1,885	27,580
Darlington	DUR	NE	Lab	Lab	22,479	56.3%	10,384	62.1%	22,479	12,095	4,358									967	39,899
Dartford	KEN	SE	Lab	Lab	21,466	48.0%	3,306	61.9%	21,466	18,160	3,781		989							344	44,740
Daventry	NTH	EM	Con	Con	27,911	49.2%	9,649	65.5%	18,262	27,911	9,130		1,381								56,684
Delyn	CON	WLS	Lab	Lab	17,825	51.5%	8,605	63.3%	17,825	9,220	5,329				2,262						34,636
Denton and Reddish	GTM	NW	Lab	Lab	21,913	65.2%	15,330	48.5%	21,913	6,583	4,152		945								33,593
Derby North	DBY	EM	Lab	Lab	22,415	50.9%	6,982	57.8%	22,415	15,433	6,206										44,054
Derby South	DBY	EM	Lab	Lab	24,310	56.4%	13,855	55.9%	24,310	10,455	8,310										43,075
Devizes	WIL	SW	Con	Con	25,159	47.2%	11,896	64.2%	13,263	25,159	11,756		1,521							1,550	53,249
Dewsbury	WYK	YTH	Lab	Lab	18,524	50.5%	7,449	58.8%	18,524	11,075	4,382		478						560	1,632	36,651
Don Valley	SYK	YTH	Lab	Lab	20,009	54.6%	9,520	54.8%	20,009	10,489	4,089		777							1,266	36,630
Doncaster Central	SYK	YTH	Lab	Lab	20,034	59.1%	11,999	51.6%	20,034	8,035	4,390		926							517	33,902
Doncaster North	SYK	YTH	Lab	Lab	19,788	63.1%	15,187	50.5%	19,788	4,601	3,323		725							2,926	31,363
Dover	KEN	SE	Lab	Lab	21,943	48.8%	5,199	65.1%	21,943	16,744	5,131		1,142								44,960
Dudley North	WMD	WM	Lab	Lab	20,095	52.1%	6,800	55.9%	20,095	13,295	3,352									1,822	38,564
Dudley South	WMD	WM	Lab	Lab	18,109	49.8%	6,817	55.4%	18,109	11,292	5,421		859							663	36,344
Dulwich and West Norwood	LND	LND	Lab	Lab	20,999	54.9%	12,310	53.4%	20,999	8,689	5,805								1,914	839	38,246
Dumbarton	SCT	SCT	Lab	Lab	16,151	47.5%	9,575	61.1%	16,151	4,648	5,265	6,576								1,354	33,994
Dumfries	SCT	SCT	Lab	Lab	20,830	48.9%	8,834	67.0%	20,830	11,996	4,955	4,103								702	42,586
Dundee East	SCT	SCT	Lab	Lab	14,635	45.2%	4,466	57.3%	14,635	3,900	2,784	10,169								879	32,367
Dundee West	SCT	SCT	Lab	Lab	14,787	50.6%	6,800	54.4%	14,787	2,656	2,620	7,987								1,192	29,242
Dunfermline East	SCT	SCT	Lab	Lab	19,487	64.8%	15,063	57.0%	19,487	2,838	2,281	4,424	286							770	30,086
Dunfermline West	SCT	SCT	Lab	Lab	16,370	52.8%	10,980	57.1%	16,370	3,166	4,832	5,390	471							746	30,975
Ealing North	LND	LND	Lab	Lab	25,022	55.7%	11,837	58.0%	25,022	13,185	5,043		668						1,039		44,957
Ealing Southall	LND	LND	Lab	Lab	22,239	47.5%	13,683	56.9%	22,239	8,556	4,680								2,119	9,234	46,828
Ealing, Acton and Shepherd's Bush	LND	LND	Lab	Lab	20,144	52.6%	10,789	56.9%	20,144	9,355	6,171		476							1,055	37,201
Easington	DUR	NE	Lab	Lab	25,360	76.8%	21,949	53.6%	25,360	3,411	3,408									831	33,010
East Antrim	NIR	NIR	UUP	UUP	13,101	36.4%	128	59.1%		807				13,101		12,973	903	2,641		5,575	36,000
East Devon	DEV	SW	Con	Con	22,681	47.4%	8,195	68.8%	7,974	22,681	14,486		2,696								47,837
East Ham	LND	LND	Lab	Lab	27,241	73.1%	21,032	52.3%	27,241	6,209	2,600		444							783	37,277
East Hampshire	HAM	SE	Con	Con	23,950	47.6%	8,890	64.3%	9,866	23,950	15,060		1,413								50,289
East Kilbride	SCT	SCT	Lab	Lab	22,205	53.3%	12,755	62.6%	22,205	4,238	4,278	9,450								1,519	41,690
East Londonderry	NIR	NIR	UUP	DUP	12,813	32.1%	1,901	66.2%						10,912		12,813	6,221	8,298		1,625	39,869
East Lothian	SCT	SCT	Lab	Lab	17,407	47.2%	10,830	62.5%	17,407	6,577	6,506	5,381								1,000	36,871
East Surrey	SRY	SE	Con	Con	24,706	52.5%	13,203	63.3%	8,994	24,706	11,503		1,846								47,049
East Worthing and Shoreham	WSX	SE	Con	Con	18,608	43.2%	6,139	59.7%	12,469	18,608	9,876		1,195							920	43,068
East Yorkshire	HUM	YTH	Con	Con	19,861	45.9%	4,682	60.1%	15,179	19,861	6,300		1,661							313	43,314
Eastbourne	SXE	SE	Con	Con	19,738	44.1%	2,154	59.6%	5,967	19,738	17,584		907							574	44,770
Eastleigh	HAM	SE	LD	LD	19,360	40.7%	3,058	63.8%	10,426	16,302	19,360		849						636		47,573
Eastwood	SCT	SCT	Lab	Lab	23,036	47.6%	9,141	70.7%	23,036	13,895	6,239	4,137								1,061	48,368
Eccles	GTM	NW	Lab	Lab	21,395	64.5%	14,528	48.3%	21,395	6,867	4,920										33,182
Eddisbury	CHS	NW	Con	Con	20,556	46.3%	4,568	64.2%	15,988	20,556	6,975		868								44,387
Edinburgh Central	SCT	SCT	Lab	Lab	14,495	42.1%	8,142	52.0%	14,495	5,643	6,353	4,832							1,809	1,258	34,390
Edinburgh East and Musselburgh	SCT	SCT	Lab	Lab	18,124	52.6%	12,168	58.2%	18,124	3,906	4,981	5,956								1,487	34,454
Edinburgh North and Leith	SCT	SCT	Lab	Lab	15,271	45.9%	8,817	53.0%	15,271	4,626	6,454	5,290								1,593	33,234
Edinburgh Pentlands	SCT	SCT	Lab	Lab	15,797	40.6%	1,742	64.4%	15,797	14,055	4,210	4,210	105							555	38,932
Edinburgh South	SCT	SCT	Lab	Lab	15,671	42.2%	5,499	57.7%	15,671	6,172	10,172	3,683								1,468	37,166
Edinburgh West	SCT	SCT	LD	LD	16,719	42.4%	7,589	63.2%	9,130	8,894	16,719	4,047								688	39,478
Edmonton	LND	LND	Lab	Lab	20,481	58.9%	9,772	56.3%	20,481	10,709	2,438		406							740	34,774
Ellesmere Port and Neston	CHS	NW	Lab	Lab	22,964	55.3%	10,861	60.9%	22,964	12,103	4,828		824						809		41,528
Elmet	WYK	YTH	Lab	Lab	22,038	48.0%	4,171	65.6%	22,038	17,867	5,001		1,031								45,937
Eltham	LND	LND	Lab	Lab	17,855	52.8%	6,996	58.7%	17,855	10,859	4,121		706							251	33,792
Enfield North	LND	LND	Lab	Lab	17,888	46.7%	2,291	57.0%	17,888	15,597	3,355		427							1,056	38,323
Enfield Southgate	LND	LND	Lab	Lab	21,727	51.8%	5,546	63.5%	21,727	16,181	2,935		298						662	105	41,908
Epping Forest	ESS	E	Con	Con	20,833	49.1%	8,426	58.4%	12,407	20,833	7,884		1,290								42,414
Epsom and Ewell	SRY	SE	Con	Con	22,430	48.1%	10,080	62.8%	12,350	22,430	10,316		1,547								46,643
Erewash	DBY	EM	Lab	Lab	23,915	49.2%	6,932	61.9%	23,915	16,983	5,586		692							1,420	48,596
Erith and Thamesmead	LND	LND	Lab	Lab	19,769	59.3%	11,167	50.2%	19,769	8,602	3,800									1,180	33,351
Esher and Walton	SRY	SE	Con	Con	22,296	49.0%	11,538	61.9%	10,758	22,296	10,241		2,236								45,531
Exeter	DEV	SW	Lab	Lab	26,194	49.8%	11,759	64.2%	26,194	14,435	6,512		1,109						1,240	3,126	52,616
Falkirk East	SCT	SCT	Lab	Lab	18,536	55.0%	10,712	57.9%	18,536	3,252	2,992	7,824								1,098	33,702
Falkirk West	SCT	SCT	Lab	Lab	16,022	51.9%	8,532	57.1%	16,022	2,321	2,203	7,490								2,855	30,891
Falmouth and Camborne	CUL	SW	Lab	Lab	18,532	39.6%	4,527	64.3%	18,532	14,005	11,453		1,328							1,502	46,820
Fareham	HAM	SE	Con	Con	21,389	47.1%	7,009	63.5%	14,380	21,389	8,503		1,175								45,447
Faversham and Mid Kent	KEN	SE	Con	Con	18,739	45.6%	4,183	60.4%	14,556	18,739	5,529		828						799	600	41,051
Feltham and Heston	LND	LND	Lab	Lab	21,406	59.2%	12,657	48.6%	21,406	8,749	4,998									1,024	36,177
Fermanagh and South Tyrone	NIR	NIR	UUP	SF	17,739	34.1%	53	78.0%						17,686			17,739	9,706		6,843	51,974
Finchley and Golders Green	LND	LND	Lab	Lab	20,205	46.3%	3,716	57.3%	20,205	16,489	5,266		330						1,385		43,675
Folkestone and Hythe	KEN	SE	Con	Con	20,645	45.0%	5,907	64.1%	9,260	20,645	14,738		1,212								45,855
Forest of Dean	GLS	SW	Lab	Lab	19,350	43.4%	2,049	67.3%	19,350	17,301	5,762		661						1,254	279	44,607
Foyle	NIR	NIR	SDLP	SDLP	24,538	50.2%	11,550	68.9%						3,360		7,414	12,988	24,538		579	48,879
Fylde	LAN	NW	Con	Con	23,383	52.3%	9,610	60.9%	13,773	23,383	6,599		982								44,737
Gainsborough	LIN	EM	Con	Con	19,555	46.2%	8,071	64.2%	11,484	19,555	11,280										42,319
Galloway and Upper Nithsdale	SCT	SCT	SNP	Con	12,222	34.0%	74	67.4%	7,258	12,222	3,698	12,148								588	35,914
Gateshead East and Washington West	TWR	NE	Lab	Lab	22,903	68.1%	17,904	52.5%	22,903	4,970	4,999		743								33,615
Gedling	NTT	EM	Lab	Lab	22,383	51.1%	5,598	63.9%	22,383	16,785	4,648										43,816
Gillingham	KEN	SE	Lab	Lab	18,782	44.5%	2,272	59.5%	18,782	16,510	5,755		933							232	42,212
Glasgow Anniesland	SCT	SCT	Lab	Lab	15,102	56.5%	11,054	50.1%	15,102	2,651	3,244	4,048								1,677	26,722
Glasgow Baillieston	SCT	SCT	Lab	Lab	14,200	61.0%	9,839	47.2%	14,200	1,580	1,551	4,361								1,569	23,261
Glasgow Cathcart	SCT	SCT	Lab	Lab	14,902	54.4%	10,816	52.6%	14,902	3,662	3,006	4,086								1,730	27,386
Glasgow Govan	SCT	SCT	Lab	Lab	12,464	49.3%	6,400	46.8%	12,464	2,167	2,815	6,064								1,774	25,284
Glasgow Kelvin	SCT	SCT	Lab	Lab	12,014	44.8%	7,260	43.6%	12,014	2,388	4,754	4,513							1,286	1,847	26,802
Glasgow Maryhill	SCT	SCT	Lab	Lab	13,420	60.4%	9,888	40.1%	13,420	1,162	2,372	3,532								1,745	22,231
Glasgow Pollok	SCT	SCT	Lab	Lab	15,497	61.3%	11,268	51.4%	15,497	1,417	1,612	4,229								2,522	25,277
Glasgow Rutherglen	SCT	SCT	Lab	Lab	16,760	57.4%	12,625	56.3%	16,760	3,301	3,689	4,135								1,328	29,213
Glasgow Shettleston	SCT	SCT	Lab	Lab	13,235	64.7%	9,818	39.7%	13,235	1,082	1,105	3,417								1,626	20,465
Glasgow Springburn	SCT	SCT	Lab	Spkr	16,053	66.6%	11,378	43.7%				4,675								19,429	24,104
Gloucester	GLS	SW	Lab	Lab	22,067	45.8%	3,880	59.4%	22,067	18,187	6,875		822							272	48,223
Gordon	SCT	SCT	LD	LD	17,928	48.5%	9,879	58.3%	4,730	8,049	17,928	5,760								534	37,001
Gosport	HAM	SE	Con	Con	17,364	43.6%	2,621	57.1%	14,743	17,364	6,011		1,162							509	39,789
Gower	WGM	WLS	Lab	Lab	17,676	47.3%	7,395	63.4%	17,676	10,281	4,507				3,865				607	417	37,353
Grantham and Stamford	LIN	EM	Con	Con	21,329	46.1%	4,518	61.3%	16,811	21,329	6,665		1,484								46,289
Gravesham	KEN	SE	Lab	Lab	21,773	49.9%	4,862	62.7%	21,773	16,911	4,031		924								43,639
Great Grimsby	HUM	YTH	Lab	Lab	19,118	57.9%	11,484	52.3%	19,118	7,634	6,265										33,017
Great Yarmouth	NFK	E	Lab	Lab	20,344	50.4%	4,564	58.3%	20,344	15,780	3,392		850								40,366
Greenock and Inverclyde	SCT	SCT	Lab	Lab	14,929	52.5%	9,890	59.3%	14,929	3,000	5,039	4,248								1,203	28,419
Greenwich and Woolwich	LND	LND	Lab	Lab	19,691	60.5%	13,433	54.1%	19,691	6,258	5,082		672							833	32,536
Guildford	SRY	SE	Con	LD	20,358	42.6%	538	62.7%	6,558	19,820	20,358		736							370	47,842
Hackney North and Stoke Newington	LND	LND	Lab	Lab	18,081	61.0%	13,651	49.0%	18,081	4,430	4,170								2,184	756	29,621
Hackney South and Shoreditch	LND	LND	Lab	Lab	19,471	64.2%	15,049	47.4%	19,471	4,180	4,422									2,274	30,347
Halesowen and Rowley Regis	WMD	WM	Lab	Lab	20,804	53.0%	7,359	59.8%	20,804	13,445	4,089		936								39,274
Halifax	WYK	YTH	Lab	Lab	19,800	49.0%	6,129	57.8%	19,800	13,671	5,878		1,041								40,390
Haltemprice and Howden	HUM	YTH	Con	Con	18,994	43.2%	1,903	65.8%	6,898	18,994	17,091		945								43,928
Halton	CHS	NW	Lab	Lab	23,841	69.2%	17,428	54.1%	23,841	6,413	4,216										34,470
Hamilton North and Bellshill	SCT	SCT	Lab	Lab	18,786	61.8%	13,561	56.8%	18,786	2,649	2,360	5,225								1,384	30,404
Hamilton South	SCT	SCT	Lab	Lab	15,965	59.7%	10,775	57.3%	15,965	1,876	2,388	5,190	151							1,187	26,757
Hammersmith and Fulham	LND	LND	Lab	Lab	19,801	44.3%	2,015	56.4%	19,801	17,786	5,294		375						1,444		44,700
Hampstead and Highgate	LND	LND	Lab	Lab	16,601	46.9%	7,876	54.3%	16,601	8,725	7,273		316						1,654	838	35,407
Harborough	LEI	EM	Con	Con	20,748	44.7%	5,252	63.3%	9,271	20,748	15,496		912								46,427
Harlow	ESS	E	Lab	Lab	19,169	47.8%	5,228	59.7%	19,169	13,941	5,381		1,223							401	40,115
Harrogate and Knaresborough	NYK	YTH	LD	LD	23,445	55.6%	8,845	64.6%	3,101	14,600	23,445		761							272	42,179
Harrow East	LND	LND	Lab	Lab	26,590	55.3%	11,124	58.4%	26,590	15,466	6,021										48,077
Harrow West	LND	LND	Lab	Lab	23,142	49.6%	6,156	63.0%	23,142	16,986	5,995		525								46,648
Hartlepool	CLV	NE	Lab	Lab	22,506	59.1%	14,571	55.8%	22,506	7,935	5,717									1,893	38,051
Harwich	ESS	E	Lab	Lab	21,951	45.6%	2,596	62.1%	21,951	19,355	4,099		2,463							247	48,115
Hastings and Rye	SXE	SE	Lab	Lab	19,402	47.1%	4,308	58.4%	19,402	15,094	4,266		911						721	824	41,218
Havant	HAM	SE	Con	Con	17,769	43.9%	4,207	57.6%	13,562	17,769	7,508		561						793	244	40,437
Hayes and Harlington	LND	LND	Lab	Lab	21,279	65.7%	13,466	56.3%	21,279	7,813	1,958									1,353	32,403
Hazel Grove	GTM	NW	LD	LD	20,020	52.0%	8,435	59.1%	6,230	11,585	20,020		643								38,478
Hemel Hempstead	HRT	E	Lab	Lab	21,389	46.6%	3,742	63.7%	21,389	17,647	5,877		970								45,883
Hemsworth	WYK	YTH	Lab	Lab	23,036	65.4%	15,636	51.8%	23,036	7,400	3,990									801	35,227
Hendon	LND	LND	Lab	Lab	21,432	52.5%	7,417	52.2%	21,432	14,015	4,724		409							271	40,851
Henley	OXF	SE	Con	Con	20,466	46.1%	8,458	64.3%	9,367	20,466	12,008		1,413						1,147		44,401
Hereford	HWR	WM	LD	LD	18,244	40.9%	968	63.6%	6,739	17,276	18,244		1,184						1,181		44,624
Hertford and Stortford	HRT	E	Con	Con	21,074	44.7%	5,603	62.2%	15,471	21,074	9,388		1,243								47,176
Hertsmere	HRT	E	Con	Con	19,855	47.8%	4,902	60.3%	14,953	19,855	6,300									397	41,505
Hexham	NBL	NE	Con	Con	18,917	44.6%	2,529	70.9%	16,388	18,917	6,380		728								42,413
Heywood and Middleton	GTM	NW	Lab	Lab	22,377	57.7%	11,670	53.1%	22,377	10,707	4,329									1,366	38,779
High Peak	DBY	EM	Lab	Lab	22,430	46.6%	4,489	65.2%	22,430	17,941	7,743										48,114
Hitchin and Harpenden	HRT	E	Con	Con	21,271	47.3%	6,663	66.9%	14,608	21,271	8,076		606							363	44,924
Holborn and St Pancras	LND	LND	Lab	Lab	16,770	53.9%	11,175	49.6%	16,770	5,258	5,595		301						1,875	1,330	31,129
Hornchurch	LND	LND	Lab	Lab	16,514	46.4%	1,482	58.3%	16,514	15,032	2,928		893							190	35,557
Hornsey and Wood Green	LND	LND	Lab	Lab	21,967	49.9%	10,614	58.0%	21,967	6,921	11,353								2,228	1,594	44,063
Horsham	WSX	SE	Con	Con	26,134	51.5%	13,666	63.8%	10,267	26,134	12,468		1,472							429	50,770
Houghton and Washington East	TWR	NE	Lab	Lab	24,628	73.2%	19,818	49.5%	24,628	4,810	4,203										33,641
Hove	SXE	SE	Lab	Lab	19,253	45.9%	3,171	58.9%	19,253	16,082	3,823		358						1,369	1,103	41,988
Huddersfield	WYK	YTH	Lab	Lab	18,840	53.2%	10,046	55.0%	18,840	8,794	5,300		613						1,254	582	35,383
Huntingdon	CAM	E	Con	Con	24,507	49.9%	12,792	61.1%	11,211	24,507	11,715		1,656								49,089
Hyndburn	LAN	NW	Lab	Lab	20,900	54.7%	8,219	57.5%	20,900	12,681	3,680		982								38,243
Ilford North	LND	LND	Lab	Lab	18,428	45.8%	2,115	58.4%	18,428	16,313	4,717		776								40,234
Ilford South	LND	LND	Lab	Lab	24,619	59.6%	13,997	54.3%	24,619	10,622	4,647		1,407								41,295
Inverness East, Nairn and Lochaber	SCT	SCT	Lab	Lab	15,605	36.8%	4,716	63.9%	15,605	5,653	9,420	10,889								894	42,461
Ipswich	SFK	E	Lab	Lab	19,952	51.3%	8,081	57.0%	19,952	11,871	5,904		624							522	38,873
Isle of Wight	IOW	SE	LD	Con	25,223	39.7%	2,826	60.8%	9,676	25,223	22,397		2,106						1,279	2,801	63,482
Islington North	LND	LND	Lab	Lab	18,699	61.9%	12,958	48.8%	18,699	3,249	5,741								1,876	651	30,216
Islington South and Finsbury	LND	LND	Lab	Lab	15,217	53.9%	7,280	47.4%	15,217	3,860	7,937									1,192	28,206
Islwyn	GNT	WLS	Lab	Lab	19,505	61.5%	15,309	61.9%	19,505	2,543	4,196				3,767					1,680	31,691
Jarrow	TWR	NE	Lab	Lab	22,777	66.1%	17,595	55.1%	22,777	5,056	5,182		716							748	34,479
Keighley	WYK	YTH	Lab	Lab	20,888	48.2%	4,005	63.4%	20,888	16,883	4,722		840								43,333
Kensington and Chelsea	LND	LND	Con	Con	15,270	54.4%	8,771	43.3%	6,499	15,270	4,416		416						1,168	279	28,048
Kettering	NTH	EM	Lab	Lab	24,034	44.7%	665	68.1%	24,034	23,369	5,469		880								53,752
Kilmarnock and Loudoun	SCT	SCT	Lab	Lab	19,926	52.9%	10,334	61.7%	19,926	3,943	3,177	9,592								1,027	37,665
Kingston and Surbiton	LND	LND	LD	LD	29,542	60.2%	15,676	67.5%	4,302	13,866	29,542		438						572	373	49,093
Kingston upon Hull East	HUM	YTH	Lab	Lab	19,938	64.6%	15,325	46.4%	19,938	4,276	4,613		1,218							830	30,875
Kingston upon Hull North	HUM	YTH	Lab	Lab	16,364	57.2%	10,721	45.5%	16,364	4,902	5,643		655							1,069	28,633
Kingston upon Hull West and Hessle	HUM	YTH	Lab	Lab	16,880	58.4%	10,951	45.8%	16,880	5,929	4,364		878							865	28,916
Kingswood	AVN	SW	Lab	Lab	28,903	54.9%	13,962	65.4%	28,903	14,941	7,747		1,085								52,676
Kirkcaldy	SCT	SCT	Lab	Lab	15,227	54.1%	8,963	54.6%	15,227	3,013	2,849	6,264								804	28,157
Knowsley North and Sefton East	MSY	NW	Lab	Lab	25,035	66.7%	18,927	53.0%	25,035	6,108	5,173									1,201	37,517
Knowsley South	MSY	NW	Lab	Lab	26,071	71.3%	21,316	51.8%	26,071	4,250	4,755									1,514	36,590
Lagan Valley	NIR	NIR	UUP	UUP	25,966	56.5%	18,342	63.2%						25,966		6,164	2,725	3,462		7,624	45,941
Lancaster and Wyre	LAN	NW	Lab	Lab	22,556	43.1%	481	65.9%	22,556	22,075	5,383		741						1,595		52,350
Leeds Central	WYK	YTH	Lab	Lab	18,277	66.9%	14,381	41.7%	18,277	3,896	3,607		775							751	27,306
Leeds East	WYK	YTH	Lab	Lab	18,290	62.9%	12,643	51.5%	18,290	5,647	3,923		634							561	29,055
Leeds North East	WYK	YTH	Lab	Lab	19,540	49.1%	7,089	62.0%	19,540	12,451	6,325		382							1,075	39,773
Leeds North West	WYK	YTH	Lab	Lab	17,794	41.9%	5,236	58.2%	17,794	12,558	11,431		668								42,451
Leeds West	WYK	YTH	Lab	Lab	19,943	62.1%	14,935	50.0%	19,943	5,008	3,350		758						2,573	462	32,094
Leicester East	LEI	EM	Lab	Lab	23,402	57.6%	13,442	62.1%	23,402	9,960	4,989									2,310	40,661
Leicester South	LEI	EM	Lab	Lab	22,958	54.5%	13,243	58.0%	22,958	9,715	7,243		333						1,217	676	42,142
Leicester West	LEI	EM	Lab	Lab	18,014	54.2%	9,639	50.9%	18,014	8,375	5,085								1,074	671	33,219
Leigh	GTM	NW	Lab	Lab	22,783	64.5%	16,362	49.7%	22,783	6,421	4,524		750							820	35,298
Leominster	HWR	WM	Con	Con	22,879	49.0%	10,367	69.4%	7,872	22,879	12,512		1,590						1,690	186	46,729
Lewes	SXE	SE	LD	LD	25,588	56.3%	9,710	68.5%	3,317	15,878	25,588		650								45,433
Lewisham Deptford	LND	LND	Lab	Lab	18,915	65.0%	15,293	48.3%	18,915	3,622	3,409								1,901	1,260	29,107
Lewisham East	LND	LND	Lab	Lab	16,160	53.7%	9,003	53.1%	16,160	7,157	4,937		361							1,469	30,084
Lewisham West	LND	LND	Lab	Lab	18,816	61.1%	11,920	50.6%	18,816	6,896	4,146		485							472	30,815
Leyton and Wanstead	LND	LND	Lab	Lab	19,558	58.0%	12,904	54.8%	19,558	6,654	5,389		378						1,030	709	33,718
Lichfield	STS	WM	Con	Con	20,480	49.1%	4,426	65.9%	16,054	20,480	4,462		684								41,680
Lincoln	LIN	EM	Lab	Lab	20,003	53.9%	8,420	56.0%	20,003	11,583	4,703		836								37,125
Linlithgow	SCT	SCT	Lab	Lab	17,207	54.4%	9,129	58.0%	17,207	2,836	2,628	8,078								906	31,655
Liverpool Garston	MSY	NW	Lab	Lab	20,043	61.4%	12,494	50.2%	20,043	5,059	7,549										32,651
Liverpool Riverside	MSY	NW	Lab	Lab	18,201	71.4%	13,950	34.1%	18,201	2,142	4,251									909	25,503
Liverpool Walton	MSY	NW	Lab	Lab	22,143	77.8%	17,996	43.0%	22,143	1,726	4,147		442								28,458
Liverpool Wavertree	MSY	NW	Lab	Lab	20,155	62.7%	12,319	44.3%	20,155	3,091	7,836		348							708	32,138
Liverpool West Derby	MSY	NW	Lab	Lab	20,454	66.2%	15,853	45.5%	20,454	2,486	3,366									4,601	30,907
Livingston	SCT	SCT	Lab	Lab	19,108	53.0%	10,616	55.6%	19,108	2,995	3,969	8,492	359							1,110	36,033
Llanelli	DFD	WLS	Lab	Lab	17,586	48.6%	6,403	62.3%	17,586	3,442	3,065				11,183				515	407	36,198
Loughborough	LEI	EM	Lab	Lab	22,016	49.7%	6,378	63.2%	22,016	15,638	5,667		933								44,254
Louth and Horncastle	LIN	EM	Con	Con	21,543	48.5%	7,554	62.1%	13,989	21,543	8,928										44,460
Ludlow	SAL	WM	Con	LD	18,620	43.2%	1,630	67.9%	5,785	16,990	18,620		858						871		43,124
Luton North	BDF	E	Lab	Lab	22,187	56.7%	9,977	57.9%	22,187	12,210	3,795		934								39,126
Luton South	BDF	E	Lab	Lab	21,719	55.2%	10,133	55.1%	21,719	11,586	4,292		578						798	378	39,351
Macclesfield	CHS	NW	Con	Con	22,284	48.9%	7,200	62.3%	15,084	22,284	8,217										45,585
Maidenhead	BRK	SE	Con	Con	19,506	45.0%	3,284	62.0%	6,577	19,506	16,222		741							272	43,318
Maidstone and The Weald	KEN	SE	Con	Con	22,621	49.6%	10,318	61.6%	12,303	22,621	9,064		978							611	45,577
Makerfield	GTM	NW	Lab	Lab	23,879	68.5%	17,750	50.9%	23,879	6,129	3,990									858	34,856
Maldon and East Chelmsford	ESS	E	Con	Con	21,719	49.2%	8,462	62.8%	13,257	21,719	7,002		1,135						987		44,100
Manchester Blackley	GTM	NW	Lab	Lab	18,285	68.9%	14,464	44.9%	18,285	3,821	3,015									1,402	26,523
Manchester Central	GTM	NW	Lab	Lab	17,812	68.7%	13,742	39.1%	17,812	2,328	4,070								1,018	700	25,928
Manchester Gorton	GTM	NW	Lab	Lab	17,099	62.8%	11,304	42.7%	17,099	2,705	5,795		462						835	333	27,229
Manchester Withington	GTM	NW	Lab	Lab	19,239	54.9%	11,524	51.9%	19,239	5,349	7,715								1,539	1,208	35,050
Mansfield	NTT	EM	Lab	Lab	21,050	57.1%	11,038	55.2%	21,050	10,012	5,790										36,852
Medway	KEN	SE	Lab	Lab	18,914	49.0%	3,780	59.5%	18,914	15,134	3,604		958								38,610
Meirionnydd Nant Conwy	CON	WLS	PC	PC	10,459	49.6%	5,684	63.9%	4,775	3,962	1,872				10,459						21,068
Meriden	WMD	WM	Con	Con	21,246	47.7%	3,784	60.4%	17,462	21,246	4,941		910								44,559
Merthyr Tydfil and Rhymney	GNT	WLS	Lab	Lab	19,574	61.8%	14,923	57.7%	19,574	2,272	2,385				4,651					2,802	31,684
Mid Bedfordshire	BDF	E	Con	Con	22,109	47.4%	8,066	65.9%	14,043	22,109	9,205		1,281								46,638
Mid Dorset and North Poole	DOR	SW	Con	LD	18,358	42.0%	384	65.6%	6,765	17,974	18,358		621								43,718
Mid Norfolk	NFK	E	Con	Con	23,519	44.8%	4,562	68.1%	18,957	23,519	7,621		1,333						1,118		52,548
Mid Sussex	WSX	SE	Con	Con	21,150	46.2%	6,898	64.9%	8,693	21,150	14,252		1,126							601	45,822
Mid Ulster	NIR	NIR	SF	SF	25,502	51.1%	9,953	81.3%								15,549	25,502	8,376		509	49,936
Mid Worcestershire	HWR	WM	Con	Con	22,937	51.1%	10,627	62.4%	12,310	22,937	8,420		1,230								44,897
Middlesbrough	CLV	NE	Lab	Lab	22,783	67.6%	16,330	49.8%	22,783	6,453	3,512									969	33,717
Middlesbrough South and East Cleveland	CLV	NE	Lab	Lab	24,321	55.3%	9,351	61.0%	24,321	14,970	4,700										43,991
Midlothian	SCT	SCT	Lab	Lab	15,145	52.7%	9,014	59.1%	15,145	2,748	3,686	6,131								1,014	28,724
Milton Keynes South West	BKM	SE	Lab	Lab	22,484	49.5%	6,978	62.3%	22,484	15,506	4,828		848						957	761	45,384
Mitcham and Morden	LND	LND	Lab	Lab	22,936	60.4%	13,785	57.8%	22,936	9,151	3,820		486						926	642	37,961
Mole Valley	SRY	SE	Con	Con	23,790	50.5%	10,153	68.9%	7,837	23,790	13,637		1,333							475	47,072
Monmouth	GNT	WLS	Lab	Lab	19,021	42.8%	384	71.5%	19,021	18,637	5,080		656		1,068						44,462
Montgomeryshire	POW	WLS	LD	LD	14,319	49.4%	6,234	65.5%	3,443	8,085	14,319		786		1,969					381	28,983
Moray	SCT	SCT	SNP	SNP	10,076	30.3%	1,744	57.4%	8,332	7,677	5,224	10,076	291							1,623	33,223
Morecambe and Lunesdale	LAN	NW	Lab	Lab	20,646	49.6%	5,092	61.1%	20,646	15,554	3,817		935						703		41,655
Morley and Rothwell	WYK	YTH	Lab	Lab	21,919	57.0%	12,090	53.5%	21,919	9,829	5,446		1,248								38,442
Motherwell and Wishaw	SCT	SCT	Lab	Lab	16,681	56.2%	10,956	56.6%	16,681	3,155	2,791	5,725								1,321	29,673
Neath	WGM	WLS	Lab	Lab	21,253	60.7%	14,816	62.5%	21,253	3,310	3,335				6,437					685	35,020
New Forest East	HAM	SE	Con	Con	17,902	42.4%	3,829	63.2%	9,141	17,902	14,073		1,062								42,178
New Forest West	HAM	SE	Con	Con	24,575	55.7%	13,191	65.0%	6,481	24,575	11,384		1,647								44,087
Newark	NTT	EM	Lab	Con	20,983	46.5%	4,073	63.5%	16,910	20,983	5,970									1,284	45,147
Newbury	BRK	SE	LD	LD	24,507	48.2%	2,415	67.3%	3,523	22,092	24,507		685								50,807
Newcastle upon Tyne Central	TWR	NE	Lab	Lab	19,169	55.0%	11,605	51.3%	19,169	7,414	7,564									723	34,870
Newcastle upon Tyne East and Wallsend	TWR	NE	Lab	Lab	20,642	63.1%	14,223	53.2%	20,642	3,873	6,419								651	1,109	32,694
Newcastle upon Tyne North	TWR	NE	Lab	Lab	21,874	60.1%	14,450	57.5%	21,874	7,424	7,070										36,368
Newcastle-under-Lyme	STS	WM	Lab	Lab	20,650	53.4%	9,986	58.8%	20,650	10,664	5,993		594							773	38,674
Newport East	GNT	WLS	Lab	Lab	17,120	54.7%	9,874	54.7%	17,120	7,246	4,394		410		1,519					593	31,282
Newport West	GNT	WLS	Lab	Lab	18,489	52.7%	9,304	59.1%	18,489	9,185	4,095		506		2,510					278	35,063
Newry and Armagh	NIR	NIR	SDLP	SDLP	20,784	37.4%	3,575	76.8%						6,833		10,795	17,209	20,784			55,621
Normanton	WYK	YTH	Lab	Lab	19,152	56.1%	9,937	52.2%	19,152	9,215	4,990									798	34,155
North Antrim	NIR	NIR	DUP	DUP	24,539	49.9%	14,224	66.1%						10,315		24,539	4,822	8,283		1,258	49,217
North Cornwall	CUL	SW	LD	LD	28,082	52.0%	9,832	63.8%	5,257	18,250	28,082		2,394								53,983
North Devon	DEV	SW	LD	LD	21,784	44.2%	2,984	68.3%	4,995	18,800	21,784		2,484						1,191		49,254
North Dorset	DOR	SW	Con	Con	22,314	46.7%	3,797	66.3%	5,334	22,314	18,517		1,019							637	47,821
North Down	NIR	NIR	UKUP	UUP	20,833	56.0%	7,324	58.8%		815				20,833			313	1,275		13,953	37,189
North Durham	DUR	NE	Lab	Lab	25,920	67.2%	18,683	56.9%	25,920	7,237	5,411										38,568
North East Bedfordshire	BDF	E	Con	Con	22,586	49.9%	8,577	64.8%	14,009	22,586	7,409		1,242								45,246
North East Cambridgeshire	CAM	E	Con	Con	23,132	48.1%	6,373	60.1%	16,759	23,132	6,733		1,189							238	48,051
North East Derbyshire	DBY	EM	Lab	Lab	23,437	55.6%	12,258	58.9%	23,437	11,179	7,508										42,124
North East Fife	SCT	SCT	LD	LD	17,926	51.7%	9,736	56.0%	3,950	8,190	17,926	3,596								1,030	34,692
North East Hampshire	HAM	SE	Con	Con	23,379	53.2%	13,257	61.6%	8,744	23,379	10,122		1,702								43,947
North East Hertfordshire	HRT	E	Con	Con	19,695	44.1%	3,444	65.0%	16,251	19,695	7,686		1,013								44,645
North East Milton Keynes	BKM	SE	Lab	Lab	19,761	42.0%	1,829	64.6%	19,761	17,932	8,375		1,026								47,094
North Essex	ESS	E	Con	Con	21,325	47.4%	7,186	62.8%	14,139	21,325	7,867		1,613								44,944
North Norfolk	NFK	E	Con	LD	23,978	42.7%	483	70.2%	7,490	23,495	23,978		608						649		56,220
North Shropshire	SAL	WM	Con	Con	22,631	48.6%	6,241	63.1%	16,390	22,631	5,945		1,165							389	46,520
North Southwark and Bermondsey	LND	LND	LD	LD	20,991	56.9%	9,632	50.1%	11,359	2,800	20,991		271						752	689	36,862
North Swindon	WIL	SW	Lab	Lab	22,371	52.9%	8,105	61.0%	22,371	14,266	4,891		800								42,328
North Tayside	SCT	SCT	SNP	SNP	15,441	40.1%	3,283	62.5%	5,715	12,158	4,365	15,441								840	38,519
North Thanet	KEN	SE	Con	Con	21,050	50.3%	6,650	59.0%	14,400	21,050	4,603		980							835	41,868
North Tyneside	TWR	NE	Lab	Lab	26,027	69.5%	20,568	57.7%	26,027	5,459	4,649		770							564	37,469
North Warwickshire	WAR	WM	Lab	Lab	24,023	54.1%	9,639	60.2%	24,023	14,384	5,052		950								44,409
North West Cambridgeshire	CAM	E	Con	Con	21,895	49.8%	8,101	61.7%	13,794	21,895	6,957		881							429	43,956
North West Durham	DUR	NE	Lab	Lab	24,526	62.5%	16,333	58.5%	24,526	8,193	5,846									661	39,226
North West Hampshire	HAM	SE	Con	Con	24,374	50.1%	12,009	62.3%	12,365	24,374	10,329		1,563								48,631
North West Leicestershire	LEI	EM	Lab	Lab	23,431	52.1%	8,157	65.8%	23,431	15,274	4,651		1,021							632	45,009
North West Norfolk	NFK	E	Lab	Con	24,846	48.5%	3,485	65.1%	21,361	24,846	4,292		704								51,203
North Wiltshire	WIL	SW	Con	Con	24,090	45.5%	3,878	67.3%	7,556	24,090	20,212		1,090								52,948
Northampton North	NTH	EM	Lab	Lab	20,507	49.4%	7,893	56.0%	20,507	12,614	7,363		596							414	41,494
Northampton South	NTH	EM	Lab	Lab	21,882	42.9%	885	59.6%	21,882	20,997	6,355		1,237							558	51,029
Northavon	AVN	SW	LD	LD	29,217	52.4%	9,877	70.7%	6,450	19,340	29,217		751								55,758
Norwich North	NFK	E	Lab	Lab	21,624	47.4%	5,863	59.1%	21,624	15,761	6,750		471						797	211	45,614
Norwich South	NFK	E	Lab	Lab	19,367	45.5%	8,816	59.8%	19,367	10,551	9,640		473						1,434	1,127	42,592
Nottingham East	NTT	EM	Lab	Lab	17,530	59.0%	10,320	45.5%	17,530	7,210	3,874									1,117	29,731
Nottingham North	NTT	EM	Lab	Lab	19,392	64.5%	12,240	46.7%	19,392	7,152	3,177									321	30,042
Nottingham South	NTT	EM	Lab	Lab	19,949	54.5%	9,989	50.1%	19,949	9,960	6,064		632								36,605
Nuneaton	WAR	WM	Lab	Lab	22,577	52.1%	7,535	60.1%	22,577	15,042	4,820		873								43,312
Ochil	SCT	SCT	Lab	Lab	16,004	45.3%	5,349	61.3%	16,004	4,235	3,253	10,655								1,156	35,303
Ogmore	MGM	WLS	Lab	Lab	18,833	62.0%	14,574	58.2%	18,833	3,383	3,878				4,259						30,353
Old Bexley and Sidcup	LND	LND	Con	Con	19,130	45.4%	3,345	62.1%	15,785	19,130	5,792		1,426								42,133
Oldham East and Saddleworth	GTM	NW	Lab	Lab	17,537	38.6%	2,726	61.0%	17,537	7,304	14,811		677							5,091	45,420
Oldham West and Royton	GTM	NW	Lab	Lab	20,441	51.2%	13,365	57.6%	20,441	7,076	4,975								918	6,552	39,962
Orkney and Shetland	SCT	SCT	LD	LD	6,919	41.3%	3,475	52.4%	3,444	3,121	6,919	2,473								776	16,733
Orpington	LND	LND	Con	Con	22,334	43.9%	269	64.6%	5,517	22,334	22,065		996								50,912
Oxford East	OXF	SE	Lab	Lab	19,681	49.4%	10,344	55.8%	19,681	7,446	9,337		570						1,501	1,313	39,848
Oxford West and Abingdon	OXF	SE	LD	LD	24,670	47.8%	9,185	64.5%	9,114	15,485	24,670		451						1,423	425	51,568
Paisley North	SCT	SCT	Lab	Lab	15,058	55.5%	9,321	56.6%	15,058	2,404	2,709	5,737								1,245	27,153
Paisley South	SCT	SCT	Lab	Lab	17,830	58.4%	11,910	57.2%	17,830	2,301	3,178	5,920								1,307	30,536
Pendle	LAN	NW	Lab	Lab	17,729	44.6%	4,275	63.2%	17,729	13,454	5,479		1,094							1,976	39,732
Penrith and The Border	CMA	NW	Con	Con	24,302	54.9%	14,677	64.5%	8,177	24,302	9,625		938							1,207	44,249
Perth	SCT	SCT	SNP	SNP	11,237	29.7%	48	61.5%	9,638	11,189	4,853	11,237								899	37,816
Peterborough	CAM	E	Lab	Lab	17,975	45.1%	2,854	61.4%	17,975	15,121	5,761		955								39,812
Plymouth Devonport	DEV	SW	Lab	Lab	24,322	58.3%	13,033	56.6%	24,322	11,289	4,513		958							637	41,719
Plymouth Sutton	DEV	SW	Lab	Lab	19,827	50.7%	7,517	57.1%	19,827	12,310	5,605		970							361	39,073
Pontefract and Castleford	WYK	YTH	Lab	Lab	21,890	69.7%	16,378	49.7%	21,890	5,512	2,315		739							935	31,391
Pontypridd	MGM	WLS	Lab	Lab	22,963	59.9%	17,684	58.0%	22,963	5,096	4,152		603		5,279					216	38,309
Poole	DOR	SW	Con	Con	17,710	45.1%	7,166	60.7%	10,544	17,710	10,011		968								39,233
Poplar and Canning Town	LND	LND	Lab	Lab	20,866	61.2%	14,108	44.9%	20,866	6,758	3,795									2,683	34,102
Portsmouth North	HAM	SE	Lab	Lab	18,676	50.7%	5,134	57.4%	18,676	13,542	3,795		559							294	36,866
Portsmouth South	HAM	SE	LD	LD	17,490	44.6%	6,094	50.9%	9,361	11,396	17,490		321							647	39,215
Preseli Pembrokeshire	DFD	WLS	Lab	Lab	15,206	41.3%	2,946	67.8%	15,206	12,260	3,882		319		4,658					452	36,777
Preston	LAN	NW	Lab	Lab	20,540	57.0%	12,268	49.2%	20,540	8,272	4,746								1,019	1,464	36,041
Pudsey	WYK	YTH	Lab	Lab	21,717	48.1%	5,626	63.3%	21,717	16,091	6,423		944								45,175
Putney	LND	LND	Lab	Lab	15,911	46.5%	2,771	56.5%	15,911	13,140	4,671		347							185	34,254
Rayleigh	ESS	E	Con	Con	21,434	50.1%	8,290	60.5%	13,144	21,434	6,614		1,581								42,773
Reading East	BRK	SE	Lab	Lab	19,538	44.8%	5,595	58.4%	19,538	13,943	8,078		525						1,053	488	43,625
Reading West	BRK	SE	Lab	Lab	22,300	53.1%	8,849	59.1%	22,300	13,451	5,387		848								41,986
Redcar	CLV	NE	Lab	Lab	23,026	60.3%	13,443	56.3%	23,026	9,583	4,817									772	38,198
Redditch	HWR	WM	Lab	Lab	16,899	45.6%	2,484	59.2%	16,899	14,415	3,808		1,259						651		37,032
Regent's Park and Kensington North	LND	LND	Lab	Lab	20,247	54.6%	10,266	48.8%	20,247	9,981	4,669		354						1,268	533	37,052
Reigate	SRY	SE	Con	Con	18,875	47.8%	8,025	60.2%	10,850	18,875	8,330		1,062							357	39,474
Rhondda	MGM	WLS	Lab	Lab	23,230	68.3%	16,047	60.6%	23,230	1,557	1,525				7,183					507	34,002
Ribble Valley	LAN	NW	Con	Con	25,308	51.5%	11,238	66.2%	9,793	25,308	14,070										49,171
Richmond Park	LND	LND	LD	LD	23,444	47.7%	4,964	67.6%	5,541	18,480	23,444		348						1,223	115	49,151
Richmond Yorks	NYK	YTH	Con	Con	25,951	58.9%	16,319	67.4%	9,632	25,951	7,890									561	44,034
Rochdale	GTM	NW	Lab	Lab	19,406	49.2%	5,655	56.7%	19,406	5,274	13,751								728	253	39,412
Rochford and Southend East	ESS	E	Con	Con	20,058	53.6%	7,034	52.7%	13,024	20,058	2,780								990	600	37,452
Romford	LND	LND	Lab	Con	18,931	53.0%	5,977	59.6%	12,954	18,931	2,869		533							414	35,701
Romsey	HAM	SE	Con	LD	22,756	47.0%	2,370	67.2%	3,986	20,386	22,756		730							601	48,459
Ross, Skye and Inverness West	SCT	SCT	LD	LD	18,832	54.1%	12,952	61.6%	5,880	3,096	18,832	4,901	456						699	948	34,812
Rossendale and Darwen	LAN	NW	Lab	Lab	20,251	49.0%	5,223	58.7%	20,251	15,028	6,079										41,358
Rother Valley	SYK	YTH	Lab	Lab	22,851	62.1%	14,882	53.2%	22,851	7,969	4,603		1,380								36,803
Rotherham	SYK	YTH	Lab	Lab	18,759	63.9%	13,077	50.7%	18,759	5,682	3,117		729						577	490	29,354
Roxburgh and Berwickshire	SCT	SCT	LD	LD	14,044	48.8%	7,511	60.6%	4,498	6,533	14,044	2,806	453							463	28,797
Rugby and Kenilworth	WAR	WM	Lab	Lab	24,221	45.0%	2,877	67.4%	24,221	21,344	7,444		787								53,796
Ruislip-Northwood	LND	LND	Con	Con	18,115	48.8%	7,537	61.1%	10,578	18,115	7,177								724	547	37,141
Runnymede and Weybridge	SRY	SE	Con	Con	20,646	48.7%	8,360	56.1%	12,286	20,646	6,924		1,332						1,238		42,426
Rushcliffe	NTT	EM	Con	Con	25,869	47.5%	7,357	66.5%	18,512	25,869	7,395		1,434						1,236		54,446
Rutland and Melton	LEI	EM	Con	Con	22,621	48.1%	8,612	64.2%	14,009	22,621	8,386		1,223						817		47,056
Ryedale	NYK	YTH	Con	Con	20,711	47.2%	4,875	65.7%	6,470	20,711	15,836		882								43,899
Saffron Walden	ESS	E	Con	Con	24,485	48.9%	12,004	65.2%	11,305	24,485	12,481		1,769								50,040
Salford	GTM	NW	Lab	Lab	14,649	65.1%	11,012	41.6%	14,649	3,446	3,637									782	22,514
Salisbury	WIL	SW	Con	Con	24,527	46.6%	8,703	65.3%	9,199	24,527	15,824		1,958						1,095		52,603
Scarborough and Whitby	NYK	YTH	Lab	Lab	22,426	47.2%	3,585	63.2%	22,426	18,841	3,977		970						1,049	260	47,523
Scunthorpe	HUM	YTH	Lab	Lab	20,096	59.8%	10,372	56.3%	20,096	9,724	3,156									649	33,625
Sedgefield	DUR	NE	Lab	Lab	26,110	64.9%	17,713	62.0%	26,110	8,397	3,624		974							1,153	40,258
Selby	NYK	YTH	Lab	Lab	22,652	45.1%	2,138	65.0%	22,652	20,514	5,569		635						902		50,272
Sevenoaks	KEN	SE	Con	Con	21,052	49.4%	10,154	63.9%	10,898	21,052	9,214		1,155							295	42,614
Sheffield Attercliffe	SYK	YTH	Lab	Lab	24,287	67.8%	18,844	52.9%	24,287	5,443	5,092		1,002								35,824
Sheffield Brightside	SYK	YTH	Lab	Lab	19,650	76.9%	17,049	47.2%	19,650	2,601	2,238		348							715	25,552
Sheffield Central	SYK	YTH	Lab	Lab	18,477	61.4%	12,544	49.5%	18,477	3,289	5,933		257						1,008	1,105	30,069
Sheffield Hallam	SYK	YTH	LD	LD	21,203	55.4%	9,347	64.8%	4,758	11,856	21,203		429								38,246
Sheffield Heeley	SYK	YTH	Lab	Lab	19,452	57.0%	11,704	55.1%	19,452	4,864	7,748		634						774	667	34,139
Sheffield Hillsborough	SYK	YTH	Lab	Lab	24,170	56.8%	14,569	57.3%	24,170	7,801	9,601		964								42,536
Sherwood	NTT	EM	Lab	Lab	24,900	54.2%	9,373	60.7%	24,900	15,527	5,473										45,900
Shipley	WYK	YTH	Lab	Lab	20,243	44.0%	1,428	66.2%	20,243	18,815	4,996		580						1,386		46,020
Shrewsbury and Atcham	SAL	WM	Lab	Lab	22,253	44.6%	3,579	66.6%	22,253	18,674	6,173		1,620						931	258	49,909
Sittingbourne and Sheppey	KEN	SE	Lab	Lab	17,340	45.8%	3,509	57.5%	17,340	13,831	5,353		661							673	37,858
Skipton and Ripon	NYK	YTH	Con	Con	25,736	52.4%	12,930	66.1%	8,543	25,736	12,806		2,041								49,126
Sleaford and North Hykeham	LIN	EM	Con	Con	24,190	49.7%	8,622	64.9%	15,568	24,190	7,894		1,067								48,719
Slough	BRK	SE	Lab	Lab	22,718	58.3%	12,508	53.4%	22,718	10,210	4,109		738							1,223	38,998
Solihull	WMD	WM	Con	Con	21,935	45.4%	9,407	63.3%	12,373	21,935	12,528		1,061							374	48,271
Somerton and Frome	SOM	SW	LD	LD	22,983	43.6%	668	69.3%	6,113	22,315	22,983		919							354	52,684
South Antrim	NIR	NIR	UUP	UUP	16,366	37.1%	1,011	62.5%						16,366		15,355	4,160	5,336		2,941	44,158
South Cambridgeshire	CAM	E	Con	Con	21,387	44.2%	8,403	67.1%	11,737	21,387	12,984		875						1,182	176	48,341
South Derbyshire	DBY	EM	Lab	Lab	26,338	50.7%	7,851	64.1%	26,338	18,487	5,233		1,074							813	51,945
South Dorset	DOR	SW	Con	Lab	19,027	42.0%	153	65.5%	19,027	18,874	6,531		913								45,345
South Down	NIR	NIR	SDLP	SDLP	24,136	46.3%	13,858	70.8%						9,173		7,802	10,278	24,136		685	52,074
South East Cambridgeshire	CAM	E	Con	Con	22,927	44.2%	8,990	63.5%	13,714	22,927	13,937		1,308								51,886
South East Cornwall	CUL	SW	LD	LD	23,756	45.9%	5,375	65.4%	6,429	18,381	23,756		1,978							1,209	51,753
South Holland and the Deepings	LIN	EM	Con	Con	25,611	55.4%	11,099	62.1%	14,512	25,611	4,761		1,318								46,202
South Norfolk	NFK	E	Con	Con	23,589	42.2%	6,893	67.6%	13,719	23,589	16,696		856						1,069		55,929
South Ribble	LAN	NW	Lab	Lab	21,386	46.4%	3,802	62.5%	21,386	17,584	7,150										46,120
South Shields	TWR	NE	Lab	Lab	19,230	63.2%	14,090	49.7%	19,230	5,140	5,127		689							262	30,448
South Staffordshire	STS	WM	Con	Con	21,295	50.5%	6,881	60.3%	14,414	21,295	4,891		1,580								42,180
South Suffolk	SFK	E	Con	Con	18,748	41.4%	5,081	66.2%	13,667	18,748	11,296		1,582								45,293
South Swindon	WIL	SW	Lab	Lab	22,260	51.3%	7,341	61.0%	22,260	14,919	5,165		713							327	43,384
South Thanet	KEN	SE	Lab	Lab	18,002	45.7%	1,792	63.9%	18,002	16,210	3,706		502							1,012	39,432
South West Bedfordshire	BDF	E	Con	Con	18,477	42.1%	776	62.1%	17,701	18,477	6,473		1,203								43,854
South West Devon	DEV	SW	Con	Con	21,970	46.8%	7,144	66.1%	14,826	21,970	8,616		1,492								46,904
South West Hertfordshire	HRT	E	Con	Con	20,933	44.3%	8,181	64.5%	12,752	20,933	12,431		847							306	47,269
South West Norfolk	NFK	E	Con	Con	27,633	52.2%	9,366	63.1%	18,267	27,633	5,681		1,368								52,949
South West Surrey	SRY	SE	Con	Con	22,462	45.3%	861	70.3%	4,321	22,462	21,601		1,208								49,592
Southampton Itchen	HAM	SE	Lab	Lab	22,553	54.5%	11,223	54.0%	22,553	11,330	6,195		829							466	41,373
Southampton Test	HAM	SE	Lab	Lab	21,824	52.5%	11,207	56.3%	21,824	10,617	7,522		792							820	41,575
Southend West	ESS	E	Con	Con	17,313	46.3%	7,941	58.0%	9,372	17,313	9,319		1,371								37,375
Southport	MSY	NW	LD	LD	18,011	43.8%	3,007	58.6%	6,816	15,004	18,011		555							767	41,153
Spelthorne	SRY	SE	Con	Con	18,851	45.1%	3,262	60.8%	15,589	18,851	6,156		1,198								41,794
St Albans	HRT	E	Lab	Lab	19,889	45.4%	4,466	66.3%	19,889	15,423	7,847		602								43,761
St Helens North	MSY	NW	Lab	Lab	22,977	61.1%	15,901	52.7%	22,977	7,076	6,609									939	37,601
St Helens South	MSY	NW	Lab	Lab	16,799	49.7%	8,985	51.4%	16,799	4,675	7,814		336							4,180	33,804
St Ives	CUL	SW	LD	LD	25,413	51.6%	10,053	66.3%	6,567	15,360	25,413		1,926								49,266
Stafford	STS	WM	Lab	Lab	21,285	48.0%	5,032	65.3%	21,285	16,253	4,205		2,315							308	44,366
Staffordshire Moorlands	STS	WM	Lab	Lab	20,904	49.0%	5,838	63.9%	20,904	15,066	5,928		760								42,658
Stalybridge and Hyde	GTM	NW	Lab	Lab	17,781	55.5%	8,859	48.4%	17,781	8,922	4,327		1,016								32,046
Stevenage	HRT	E	Lab	Lab	22,025	51.9%	8,566	60.7%	22,025	13,459	6,027									942	42,453
Stirling	SCT	SCT	Lab	Lab	15,175	42.2%	6,274	67.7%	15,175	8,901	4,208	5,877							757	1,012	35,930
Stockport	GTM	NW	Lab	Lab	20,731	58.6%	11,569	53.3%	20,731	9,162	5,490										35,383
Stockton North	CLV	NE	Lab	Lab	22,470	63.4%	14,647	54.8%	22,470	7,823	4,208								926		35,427
Stockton South	CLV	NE	Lab	Lab	23,414	53.0%	9,086	62.9%	23,414	14,328	6,012									455	44,209
Stoke-on-Trent Central	STS	WM	Lab	Lab	17,170	60.7%	11,845	47.4%	17,170	5,325	4,148									1,657	28,300
Stoke-on-Trent North	STS	WM	Lab	Lab	17,460	58.0%	11,784	51.9%	17,460	5,676	3,580									3,399	30,115
Stoke-on-Trent South	STS	WM	Lab	Lab	19,366	53.8%	10,489	51.4%	19,366	8,877	4,724									3,061	36,028
Stone	STS	WM	Con	Con	22,395	49.1%	6,036	66.3%	16,359	22,395	6,888										45,642
Stourbridge	WMD	WM	Lab	Lab	18,823	47.1%	3,812	61.8%	18,823	15,011	4,833		763							494	39,924
Strangford	NIR	NIR	UUP	DUP	18,532	42.8%	1,110	59.9%						17,422		18,532	930	2,646		3,724	43,254
Stratford-on-Avon	WAR	WM	Con	Con	27,606	50.3%	11,802	64.4%	9,164	27,606	15,804		1,184						1,156		54,914
Strathkelvin and Bearsden	SCT	SCT	Lab	Lab	19,250	46.4%	11,717	66.0%	19,250	6,635	7,533	6,675								1,393	41,486
Streatham	LND	LND	Lab	Lab	21,041	56.9%	14,270	49.1%	21,041	6,639	6,771								1,641	906	36,998
Stretford and Urmston	GTM	NW	Lab	Lab	23,836	61.1%	13,271	54.8%	23,836	10,565	3,891									713	39,005
Stroud	GLS	SW	Lab	Lab	25,685	46.6%	5,039	69.9%	25,685	20,646	6,036		895						1,913		55,175
Suffolk Coastal	SFK	E	Con	Con	21,847	43.3%	4,326	65.6%	17,521	21,847	9,192		1,847								50,407
Sunderland North	TWR	NE	Lab	Lab	18,685	62.7%	13,354	49.0%	18,685	5,331	3,599									2,205	29,820
Sunderland South	TWR	NE	Lab	Lab	19,921	63.9%	13,667	48.3%	19,921	6,254	3,675		470							867	31,187
Surrey Heath	SRY	SE	Con	Con	22,401	49.7%	10,819	59.5%	9,640	22,401	11,582		1,479								45,102
Sutton and Cheam	LND	LND	LD	LD	19,382	48.8%	4,304	62.4%	5,263	15,078	19,382										39,723
Sutton Coldfield	WMD	WM	Con	Con	21,909	50.4%	10,104	60.5%	11,805	21,909	8,268		1,186							284	43,452
Swansea East	WGM	WLS	Lab	Lab	19,612	65.2%	16,148	52.3%	19,612	3,026	3,064		443		3,464				463		30,072
Swansea West	WGM	WLS	Lab	Lab	15,644	48.7%	9,550	55.8%	15,644	6,094	5,313		653		3,404				626	366	32,100
Tamworth	STS	WM	Lab	Lab	19,722	49.0%	4,598	57.8%	19,722	15,124	4,721		683								40,250
Tatton	CHS	NW	Ind	Con	19,860	48.1%	8,611	63.5	11,249	19,860	7,685		769							1,715	41,278
Taunton	SOM	SW	LD	Con	23,033	41.7%	235	67.6%	8,254	23,033	22,798		1,140								55,225
Teignbridge	DEV	SW	Con	LD	26,343	44.4%	3,011	69.3%	7,366	23,332	26,343		2,269								59,310
Telford	SAL	WM	Lab	Lab	16,854	54.6%	8,383	52.0%	16,854	8,471	3,983		1,098							469	30,875
Tewkesbury	GLS	SW	Con	Con	20,830	46.1%	8,663	64.3%	12,167	20,830	11,863									335	45,195
The Cotswolds	GLS	SW	Con	Con	23,133	50.3%	11,983	67.5%	10,383	23,133	11,150		1,315								45,981
The Wrekin	SAL	WM	Lab	Lab	19,532	47.1%	3,587	63.1%	19,532	15,945	4,738		1,275								41,490
Thurrock	ESS	E	Lab	Lab	21,121	56.5%	9,997	49.0%	21,121	11,124	3,846		1,271								37,362
Tiverton and Honiton	DEV	SW	Con	Con	26,258	47.1%	6,284	69.2%	6,647	26,258	19,974		1,281						1,030	594	55,784
Tonbridge and Malling	KEN	SE	Con	Con	20,956	49.4%	8,250	64.3%	12,706	20,956	7,605		1,169								42,436
Tooting	LND	LND	Lab	Lab	20,332	54.1%	10,400	54.9%	20,332	9,932	5,583								1,744		37,591
Torbay	DEV	SW	LD	LD	24,015	50.5%	6,708	62.5%	4,484	17,307	24,015		1,512							251	47,569
Torfaen	GNT	WLS	Lab	Lab	21,883	62.1%	16,280	57.7%	21,883	5,603	3,936		657		2,720					443	35,242
Torridge and West Devon	DEV	SW	LD	LD	23,474	42.2%	1,194	70.5%	5,959	22,280	23,474		2,674						1,297		55,684
Totnes	DEV	SW	Con	Con	21,914	44.5%	3,597	67.9%	6,005	21,914	18,317		3,010								49,246
Tottenham	LND	LND	Lab	Lab	21,317	67.5%	16,916	48.2%	21,317	4,401	3,008								1,443	1,432	31,601
Truro and St Austell	CUL	SW	LD	LD	24,296	48.3%	8,065	63.5%	6,889	16,231	24,296		1,664							1,215	50,295
Tunbridge Wells	KEN	SE	Con	Con	19,643	48.9%	9,730	62.3%	9,332	19,643	9,913		1,313								40,201
Tweeddale, Ettrick and Lauderdale	SCT	SCT	LD	LD	14,035	42.3%	5,157	63.4%	8,878	5,118	14,035	4,108								1,078	33,217
Twickenham	LND	LND	LD	LD	24,344	48.7%	7,655	66.4%	6,903	16,689	24,344		579						1,423		49,938
Tyne Bridge	TWR	NE	Lab	Lab	18,345	70.5%	14,889	44.2%	18,345	3,456	3,213									1,018	26,032
Tynemouth	TWR	NE	Lab	Lab	23,364	53.2%	8,678	67.4%	23,364	14,686	5,108		745								43,903
Upminster	LND	LND	Lab	Con	15,410	45.5%	1,241	59.6%	14,169	15,410	3,183		1,089								33,851
Upper Bann	NIR	NIR	UUP	UUP	17,095	33.5%	2,058	70.3%						17,095		15,037	10,771	7,607		527	51,037
Uxbridge	LND	LND	Con	Con	15,751	47.1%	2,098	57.5%	13,653	15,751	3,426		588								33,418
Vale of Clwyd	CON	WLS	Lab	Lab	16,179	50.0%	5,761	63.6%	16,179	10,418	3,058		391		2,300						32,346
Vale of Glamorgan	SGM	WLS	Lab	Lab	20,524	45.4%	4,700	66.7%	20,524	15,824	5,521		448		2,867						45,184
Vale of York	NYK	YTH	Con	Con	25,033	51.6%	12,517	66.1%	12,516	25,033	9,799		1,142								48,490
Vauxhall	LND	LND	Lab	Lab	19,738	59.1%	13,018	44.8%	19,738	4,489	6,720								1,485	960	33,392
Wakefield	WYK	YTH	Lab	Lab	20,592	49.9%	7,954	54.5%	20,592	12,638	5,097		677						1,075	1,175	41,254
Wallasey	MSY	NW	Lab	Lab	22,718	60.8%	12,276	57.6%	22,718	10,442	4,186										37,346
Walsall North	WMD	WM	Lab	Lab	18,779	58.1%	9,391	49.0%	18,779	9,388	2,923		812							410	32,312
Walsall South	WMD	WM	Lab	Lab	20,574	59.0%	9,931	55.7%	20,574	10,643	2,365		974							343	34,899
Walthamstow	LND	LND	Lab	Lab	21,402	62.2%	15,181	53.5%	21,402	6,221	5,024		298							1,484	34,429
Wansbeck	NBL	NE	Lab	Lab	21,617	57.8%	13,101	59.3%	21,617	4,774	8,516		482						954	1,076	37,419
Wansdyke	SOM	SW	Lab	Lab	23,206	46.8%	5,613	69.9%	23,206	17,593	7,135		655						958		49,547
Wantage	OXF	SE	Con	Con	19,475	39.6%	5,600	64.5%	13,875	19,475	13,776		941						1,062		49,129
Warley	WMD	WM	Lab	Lab	19,007	60.5%	11,850	54.1%	19,007	7,157	3,315									1,936	31,415
Warrington North	CHS	NW	Lab	Lab	24,026	61.7%	15,156	53.7%	24,026	8,870	5,232		782								38,910
Warrington South	CHS	NW	Lab	Lab	22,419	49.3%	7,397	61.2%	22,419	15,022	7,419		637								45,497
Warwick and Leamington	WAR	WM	Lab	Lab	26,108	48.8%	5,953	65.8%	26,108	20,155	5,964		648							664	53,539
Watford	HRT	E	Lab	Lab	20,992	45.3%	5,555	61.1%	20,992	15,437	8,088		535						900	420	46,372
Waveney	SFK	E	Lab	Lab	23,914	50.7%	8,553	60.8%	23,914	15,361	5,370		1,097						983	442	47,167
Wealden	SXE	SE	Con	Con	26,279	49.8%	13,772	63.5%	10,705	26,279	12,507		1,539						1,273	453	52,756
Weaver Vale	CHS	NW	Lab	Lab	20,611	52.5%	9,637	57.6%	20,611	10,974	5,643		559							1,484	39,271
Wellingborough	NTH	EM	Lab	Lab	23,867	46.8%	2,355	64.1%	23,867	21,512	4,763		864								51,006
Wells	SOM	SW	Con	Con	22,462	43.8%	2,796	69.2%	7,915	22,462	19,666		1,104							167	51,314
Welwyn Hatfield	HRT	E	Lab	Lab	18,484	43.2%	1,196	63.9%	18,484	17,288	6,021		798							230	42,821
Wentworth	SYK	YTH	Lab	Lab	22,798	67.5%	16,449	52.8%	22,798	6,349	3,652		979								33,778
West Aberdeenshire and Kincardine	SCT	SCT	LD	LD	16,507	43.5%	4,821	62.0%	4,669	11,686	16,507	4,634								418	37,914
West Bromwich East	WMD	WM	Lab	Lab	18,250	55.9%	9,763	53.4%	18,250	8,487	4,507		835							585	32,664
West Bromwich West	WMD	WM	Spkr	Lab	19,352	60.8%	11,355	47.7%	19,352	7,997	2,168		499							1,824	31,840
West Chelmsford	ESS	E	Con	Con	20,446	42.5%	6,261	61.2%	14,185	20,446	11,197		785						837	693	48,143
West Derbyshire	DBY	EM	Con	Con	24,280	48.0%	7,370	67.8%	16,910	24,280	7,922		672							805	50,589
West Dorset	DOR	SW	Con	Con	22,126	44.6%	1,414	69.5%	6,733	22,126	20,712										49,571
West Ham	LND	LND	Lab	Lab	20,449	69.9%	15,645	48.9%	20,449	4,804	2,166		657						1,197		29,273
West Lancashire	LAN	NW	Lab	Lab	23,404	54.5%	9,643	58.8%	23,404	13,761	4,966									840	42,971
West Renfrewshire	SCT	SCT	Lab	Lab	15,720	46.9%	8,575	63.3%	15,720	5,522	4,185	7,145								925	33,497
West Suffolk	SFK	E	Con	Con	20,201	47.6%	4,295	60.5%	15,906	20,201	5,017		1,321								42,445
West Tyrone	NIR	NIR	UUP	SF	19,814	40.8%	5,040	79.9%						14,774			19,814	13,942			48,530
West Worcestershire	HWR	WM	Con	Con	20,597	46.0%	5,374	67.1%	6,275	20,597	15,223		1,574						1,138		44,807
Westbury	WIL	SW	Con	Con	21,299	42.1%	5,294	66.6%	10,847	21,299	16,005		1,261						1,216		50,628
Western Isles	SCT	SCT	Lab	Lab	5,924	45.0%	1,074	60.6%	5,924	1,250	849	4,850								286	13,159
Westmorland and Lonsdale	CMA	NW	Con	Con	22,486	46.9%	3,147	67.8%	5,234	22,486	19,339		552							292	47,903
Weston-super-Mare	AVN	SW	LD	LD	18,424	39.5%	338	62.8%	9,235	18,086	18,424		650							285	46,680
Wigan	GTM	NW	Lab	Lab	20,739	61.7%	13,743	52.5%	20,739	6,996	4,970									886	33,591
Wimbledon	LND	LND	Lab	Lab	18,806	45.7%	3,744	64.3%	18,806	15,062	5,341		414						1,007	479	41,109
Winchester	HAM	SE	LD	LD	32,282	54.6%	9,634	72.3%	3,498	22,648	32,282		664							66	59,158
Windsor	BRK	SE	Con	Con	19,900	47.3%	8,889	57.0%	10,137	19,900	11,011		1,062								42,110
Wirral South	MSY	NW	Lab	Lab	18,890	47.4%	5,049	65.6%	18,890	13,841	7,087										39,818
Wirral West	MSY	NW	Lab	Lab	19,105	47.2%	4,035	65.0%	19,105	15,070	6,300										40,475
Witney	OXF	SE	Con	Con	22,153	45.0%	7,973	65.9%	14,180	22,153	10,000		767						1,100	1,003	49,203
Woking	SRY	SE	Con	Con	19,747	46.0%	6,759	60.2%	8,714	19,747	12,988		1,461								42,910
Wokingham	BRK	SE	Con	Con	20,216	46.1%	5,994	64.1%	7,633	20,216	14,222		897							880	43,848
Wolverhampton North East	WMD	WM	Lab	Lab	18,984	60.3%	9,965	52.8%	18,984	9,019	2,494		997								31,494
Wolverhampton South East	WMD	WM	Lab	Lab	18,409	67.4%	12,464	51.3%	18,409	5,945	2,389									554	27,297
Wolverhampton South West	WMD	WM	Lab	Lab	19,735	48.3%	3,487	62.1%	19,735	16,248	3,425		684						805		40,897
Woodspring	SOM	SW	Con	Con	21,297	43.7%	8,798	68.7%	12,499	21,297	11,816		452						1,282	1,412	48,758
Worcester	HWR	WM	Lab	Lab	21,478	48.6%	5,766	62.0%	21,478	15,712	5,578		1,442								44,210
Workington	CMA	NW	Lab	Lab	23,209	55.5%	10,850	63.4%	23,209	12,359	5,214									1,040	41,822
Worsley	GTM	NW	Lab	Lab	20,193	57.1%	11,787	53.1%	20,193	8,406	6,188									576	35,363
Worthing West	WSX	SE	Con	Con	20,508	47.5%	9,037	59.7%	9,270	20,508	11,471		1,960								43,209
Wrexham	CON	WLS	Lab	Lab	15,934	53.0%	9,188	59.5%	15,934	6,746	5,153		432		1,783						30,048
Wycombe	BKM	SE	Con	Con	19,064	42.4%	3,168	60.5%	15,896	19,064	7,658		1,059						1,057	240	44,974
Wyre Forest	HWR	WM	Lab	ICHC	28,487	58.1%	17,630	68.0%	10,857	9,350			368							28,487	49,062
Wythenshawe and Sale East	GTM	NW	Lab	Lab	21,032	60.0%	12,608	48.6%	21,032	8,424	4,320								869	410	35,055
Yeovil	SOM	SW	LD	LD	21,266	44.2%	3,928	64.2%	7,077	17,338	21,266		1,131						786	534	48,132
Ynys Môn	GWN	WLS	PC	Lab	11,906	35.0%	800	63.7%	11,906	7,653	2,772		359		11,106					222	34,018
Total for all constituencies								59.4%	10,724,953	8,357,615	4,814,321	464,314	390,563	216,839	195,893	181,999	175,933	169,865	166,477	508,611	26,314,734
Total for all constituencies								59.4%	40.7%	31.7%	18.3%	1.8%	1.5%	0.8%	0.7%	0.7%	0.7%	0.6%	0.6%	1.9%	100.0%
Total for all constituencies								59.4%	Seats												
Total for all constituencies								59.4%	412	166	52	5	0	6	4	5	4	3	0	2	650
Total for all constituencies								59.4%	62.5%	25.2%	7.9%	0.8%	0.0%	0.9%	0.6%	0.8%	0.6%	0.5%	0.0%	0.3%	100.0%

== See also ==
- Results of the 2005 United Kingdom general election
- Results of the 2010 United Kingdom general election
- Results of the 2015 United Kingdom general election
- List of political parties in the United Kingdom
- List of United Kingdom by-elections (1979–present)
