= Jimmy Wray =

Scottish politician (1935–2013)

Member of Parliament for Glasgow Baillieston Glasgow Provan (1987–1997)
- In office 11 June 1987 – 11 April 2005
- Preceded by: Hugh Brown
- Succeeded by: Constituency Abolished

Personal details
- Born: James Aloysius Joseph Patrick Gabriel Wray; 28 April 1935 Govan, Glasgow, Scotland, UK
- Died: 25 May 2013 (aged 78) Mearnskirk Home Hospital, Renfrewshire, Scotland, UK
- Party: Labour

James Aloysius Joseph Patrick Gabriel Wray (28 April 1935 – 25 May 2013) was a Scottish politician and Labour Member of Parliament for Glasgow Baillieston and Glasgow Provan.

Born and raised in the Gorbals, he was one of eight children born in an economically disadvantaged Roman Catholic family. A boxer in his younger days, he was elected as a councillor to the then Glasgow Town Council in 1964 for Kelvinside, and moved over to the larger Strathclyde Regional Council in 1975 for Gorbals. He successfully blocked implementation of fluoridation in court by arguing it violated the 1946 Water Act and the 1968 Medicine Act.

Wray became a rag and bone man, a coalman and a lorry driver, owning a fleet of lorries and a coal business, and became a property developer. By the time he became an MP, Wray was a wealthy man. He was on the left-wing of the Labour Party, and joined the Campaign Group. His political stances were Eurosceptic, an advocate of Irish republicanism regarding Northern Ireland, and opposed to abortion and the abolition of Section 28. His views on Northern Ireland led him to be tagged "I.R. Wray" by Private Eye. In 2002, he attacked the Scottish Parliament, labelling its members "odds and sods".

Wray stood down as an MP, aged 70, at the 2005 general election following a stroke in December 2003.

== Death ==
Wray died on 25 May 2013 in Mearnskirk Home Hospital in Renfrewshire after suffering from bowel cancer, aged 78. He had two daughters and two sons.

Parliament of the United Kingdom
Preceded by Hugh Brown	Member of Parliament for Glasgow Provan; 1987–1997	constituency abolished
New constituency	Member of Parliament for Glasgow Baillieston; 1997–2005	constituency abolished
