= Charles McFarlane =

Scottish Unionist Party politician

Sir Charles Stuart McFarlane (10 October 1895 – 4 February 1958) was a Scottish Unionist Party politician. He served as the member of parliament for Glasgow Camlachie from 1948 to 1950.

He contested the seat at the 1945 general election but was unsuccessful. McFarlane won it three years later at a by-election in January 1948 with a majority of 395 votes, but was defeated at the next election in 1950. He contested the seat again in 1951, and stood for Glasgow Provan in 1955, losing quite narrowly each time to the Labour Party candidates.

He was Director of J. & A. McFarlane, a hardware manufacturer business in Glasgow. He was awarded an O.B.E. in the 1936 Birthday Honours and was knighted in the 1955 New Year Honours.

Parliament of the United Kingdom
Preceded by Campbell Stephen	Member of Parliament for Glasgow Camlachie; 1948–1950	Succeeded by William Reid
