= 1948 Glasgow Camlachie by-election =

UK by-election

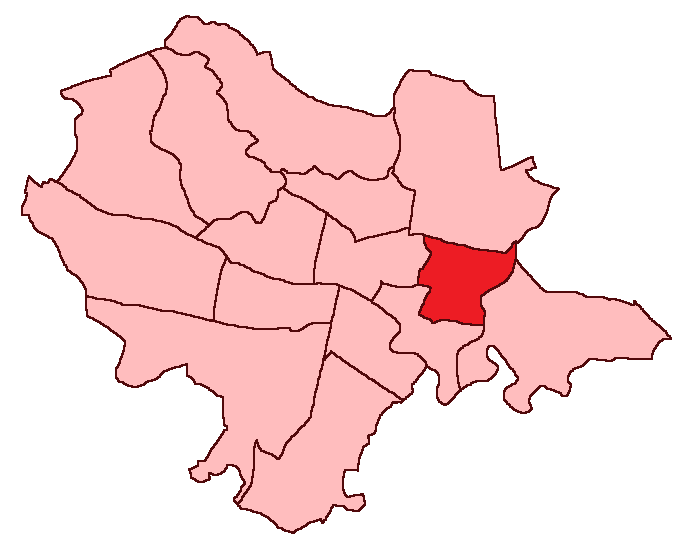
Camlachie in Glasgow, 1948

The 1948 Glasgow Camlachie by-election was held on Wednesday 28 January 1948, following the death of the sitting member of parliament, Campbell Stephen.

Stephen was re-elected for the Independent Labour Party (ILP) at the 1945 general election. However, he resigned the ILP whip two years later, and later that year joined the Labour Party, under which banner he had held the seat from 1922 to 1931.

The ILP had achieved a fairly close victory over the Unionist Party in the seat in a two-way fight at the 1945 general election. Since then, its most prominent figure, James Maxton, had died. The party won the subsequent by-election, but all three of its MPs had since defected to the Labour Party. With the ILP in sharp decline, and given that the Labour Party intended to contest the seat, commentators did not expect the ILP to retain control of the seat, and concluded that it would be a Labour-Unionist contest. The ILP selected Annie Maxton, sister of James, as their candidate.

A constituency in a working-class area of Glasgow, the constituency naturally appeared to be Labour Party territory. The party chose John M. Inglis, a train driver and trade unionist.

Nationwide, Labour had won a landslide victory at the 1945 general election, and the Conservatives had not gained a single seat since. However, given their strong second place in Camlachie in 1945, and the left-wing vote divided, they hoped to gain the seat. They selected Charles McFarlane, a local factory owner, who had previously fought the seat in 1945.

Despite having no background in the constituency, the Scottish National Party and Liberal Party also stood candidates. Guy Aldred, a well-known local anarcho-communist stood for his United Socialist Movement on an abstentionist anti-Parliamentary platform.

The SNP also suffered a rift as a result of the by-election; although Wilkie ran under the SNP banner, his candidature had not been approved by any leadership body in the party, and the SNP's executive subsequently stripped him of his membership. As a result, former SNP Chairman Douglas Young quit the party, eventually rejoining Labour, whilst Andrew Dewar Gibb considered returning to the Unionists.

The election was won narrowly by McFarlane for the Unionists. Labour finished in a close second place, but were cautioned by the Manchester Guardian: "Camlachie's chief warning is ... that a government candidate cannot even rouse the slums". The ILP vote declined dramatically, and demonstrated that the party was no longer a significant political force. The SNP finished in fourth place, while the Liberals finished in sixth place, beaten even by Aldred. This was the worst Liberal result at any British by-election since World War II, until the Liberal Democrats took eighth place at the 2012 Rotherham by-election.

McFarlane lost the seat at the 1950 general election to William Reid of the Labour Party. Annie Maxton remained a prominent figure in the ILP, eventually becoming its chair.

== Result ==
Glasgow Camlachie by-election, 1948
Party	Candidate	Votes	%	±%
Unionist	Charles McFarlane	11,085	43.7	+1.4
Labour	John M. Inglis	10,690	42.1	N/A
Ind. Labour Party	Annie Maxton	1,622	6.4	−51.3
SNP	Robert Blair Wilkie	1,320	5.2	New
United Socialist Movement	Guy Aldred	345	1.4	New
Liberal	Edward Rogers Goodfellow	312	1.2	New
Majority		395	1.6	N/A
Turnout		25,374	56.8	−8.3
Unionist gain from Ind. Labour Party		Swing	+26.4	

=== Previous election result ===
General election 1945: Glasgow Camlachie
Party	Candidate	Votes	%	±%
Ind. Labour Party	Campbell Stephen	15,558	57.7	+10.6
Unionist	Charles McFarlane	11,399	42.3	−2.0
Majority		4,159	15.4	+12.6
Turnout		26,957	65.1	
Ind. Labour Party hold		Swing		
