= Glasgow Provan (UK Parliament constituency) =

Parliamentary constituency in the United Kingdom, 1955–1997

- Former burgh constituency for the House of Commons
- Subdivisions of Scotland: County of city of Glasgow; City of Glasgow district

1955–1997
- Seats: One
- Created from: Glasgow Camlachie
- Replaced by: Glasgow Baillieston and Glasgow Springburn

Glasgow Provan was a burgh constituency represented in the House of Commons of the Parliament of the United Kingdom from 1955 until 1997. It elected one Member of Parliament (MP) using the first-past-the-post voting system.

== Boundaries ==
1955–1974: The County of the City of Glasgow wards of Dennistoun and Provan.

1974–1983: The County of the City of Glasgow ward of Provan, and part of Shettleston and Tollcross ward.

1983–1997: The City of Glasgow District electoral divisions of Gartloch/Easterhouse, Lethamhill/Riddrie, and Queenslie/Barlanark.

== Members of Parliament ==
Election	Member	Party
1955	William Reid	Labour
1964	Hugh Brown	Labour
1987	Jimmy Wray	Labour
1997	constituency abolished	

== Election results ==
=== Elections in the 1950s ===
General election 1955: Glasgow Provan
Party	Candidate	Votes	%	±%
Labour	William Reid	15,533	50.3	
Unionist	Charles McFarlane	15,353	49.7	
Majority		180	0.6	
Turnout		30,886	74.7	
Labour hold		Swing		

General election 1959: Glasgow Provan
Party	Candidate	Votes	%	±%
Labour	William Reid	21,608	55.6	+5.3
Unionist	Robert D Kernohan	17,241	44.4	−5.3
Majority		4,367	11.2	+10.6
Turnout		38,849	78.8	+4.1
Labour hold		Swing		

=== Elections in the 1960s ===
General election 1964: Glasgow Provan
Party	Candidate	Votes	%	±%
Labour	Hugh Brown	29,889	65.8	+10.2
Unionist	K. B. Miller	15,524	34.2	−10.2
Majority		14,365	31.6	+20.4
Turnout		45,413	75.7	−3.1
Labour hold		Swing		

General election 1966: Glasgow Provan
Party	Candidate	Votes	%	±%
Labour	Hugh Brown	28,201	66.9	+1.1
Conservative	D. I. Fraser	12,986	30.8	−3.4
Communist	J. Jackson	988	2.3	New
Majority		15,215	36.1	+4.5
Turnout		42,175	70.8	−4.9
Labour hold		Swing		

=== Elections in the 1970s ===
General election 1970: Glasgow Provan
Party	Candidate	Votes	%	±%
Labour	Hugh Brown	25,864	60.8	−6.1
Conservative	Donald Masterton	11,881	27.9	−2.9
SNP	Willie McRae	7,367	19.6	New
Communist	John Jackson	601	1.4	−0.9
Majority		13,983	32.9	−3.2
Turnout		45,713	65.4	−5.4
Labour hold		Swing		

General election February 1974: Glasgow Provan
Party	Candidate	Votes	%	±%
Labour	Hugh Brown	23,154	61.6	
SNP	R. Edwards	7,367	19.6	
Conservative	Gerry Malone	6,324	16.8	
Communist	John Jackson	749	2.0	
Majority		15,787	42.0	
Turnout		37,594	69.0	
Labour hold		Swing		

General election October 1974: Glasgow Provan
Party	Candidate	Votes	%	±%
Labour	Hugh Brown	20,602	58.6	−3.0
SNP	R. Edwards	10,628	30.2	+10.6
Conservative	R. McKay	3,448	9.8	−7.0
Communist	John Jackson	503	1.4	−0.6
Majority		9,974	28.4	−13.6
Turnout		35,181	64.0	−5.0
Labour hold		Swing		

General election 1979: Glasgow Provan
Party	Candidate	Votes	%	±%
Labour	Hugh Brown	24,083	69.5	+10.9
Conservative	S. M. Langdon	5,239	15.1	+5.3
SNP	R. Cunning	4,767	13.8	−16.4
Communist	John Jackson	377	1.1	−0.3
Workers Revolutionary	M. Campbell	193	0.6	New
Majority		18,844	54.4	+26.0
Turnout		34,659	66.0	+2.0
Labour hold		Swing		

=== Elections in the 1980s ===
General election 1983: Glasgow Provan
Party	Candidate	Votes	%	±%
Labour	Hugh Brown	20,040	64.4	−5.1
SDP	Allan Heron	4,655	15.0	New
Conservative	Sheenagh Gordon	3,374	11.0	−4.1
SNP	Pat Kennedy	2,737	8.8	−5.0
Communist	John Jackson	294	1.0	−0.1
Majority		15,385	49.4	−5.0
Turnout		31,100	65.2	−0.8
Labour hold		Swing		

General election 1987: Glasgow Provan
Party	Candidate	Votes	%	±%
Labour	Jimmy Wray	22,032	72.9	+8.5
SNP	William Ramsay	3,660	12.1	+3.3
Conservative	Anne Strutt	2,336	7.7	−3.3
SDP	John Morrison	2,189	7.2	−7.8
Majority		18,372	60.8	+11.4
Turnout		30,217	69.1	+3.9
Labour hold		Swing	+2.6	

=== Elections in the 1990s ===
General election 1992: Glasgow Provan
Party	Candidate	Votes	%	±%
Labour	Jimmy Wray	15,885	66.5	−6.4
SNP	Alexandra MacRae	5,182	21.7	+9.6
Conservative	Andrew Rosindell	1,865	7.8	+0.1
Liberal Democrats	Charles Bell	948	4.0	−3.2
Majority		10,703	44.8	−16.0
Turnout		23,880	65.3	−3.8
Labour hold		Swing	-8.0	
