= William Reid (British politician) =

Scottish Labour Party politician

William Reid (6 November 1884 – 16 July 1965) was a Scottish Labour Party politician who served as Member of Parliament from 1950 to 1964.

After having served as a councillor for thirty years, he was first elected to the House of Commons for Glasgow Camlachie at the 1950 general election, ousting the sitting Conservative MP Charles Stuart McFarlane, who had been elected in a 1948 by-election. Reid was returned at the 1951 general election, but the constituency was abolished in 1955.

At the 1955 general election, he was returned for the new constituency of Glasgow Provan, where was re-elected three further times before his retirement at the 1964 general election.

Parliament of the United Kingdom
Preceded by Charles Stuart McFarlane	Member of Parliament for Glasgow Camlachie; 1950–1955	Constituency abolished
New constituency	Member of Parliament for Glasgow Provan; 1955–1964	Succeeded by Hugh Brown
