= Hugh Brown (politician) =

British politician

Hugh Dunbar Brown (18 May 1919 – 10 March 2008) was a British Labour Party politician. After serving as a councillor on the Glasgow Corporation, he was Member of Parliament for Glasgow Provan for 23 years. He has been described as the last "Red Clydesider".

== Early life ==
Brown was born in Glasgow, Scotland, where his father was a Clydeside engineer. He was educated at Allan Glen's School and Whitehill Secondary School, Glasgow. He left school aged 14 to work at the Post Office, and played semi-professional football at Shettleston Juniors. By 1935 he was a temporary postman-messenger and by 1937 a sorting clerk and telegraphist. Both of his parents were members of the Independent Labour Party, which he also joined in 1935. He moved over to the Labour Party in 1946. He became a civil servant in 1947 at the Ministry of Pensions and National Insurance.

In 1947 he married Mary Carmichael, daughter of ILP and then Labour MP Jimmy Carmichael and sister of future Labour MP and peer Neil Carmichael, and he served as a councillor on the Glasgow Corporation from 1954. He became a magistrate in 1961.

== Political career ==
Brown left the civil service in 1962, when he was selected as a prospective parliamentary candidate, and served as MP for Glasgow Provan from 1964 until he retired in 1987. His constituency in north-east Glasgow had a high rate of unemployment, included several large public sector housing estates, including Easterhouse and Blackhill, and also covered Barlinnie Prison. His political views lay to the left wing of the party, and his parliamentary interests concentrated mainly on constituency and Scottish matters. After winning the ballot for Private Members Bills one year, he successfully pushed through his bill to become the Employer's Liability (Defective Equipment) Act 1969.

He was Parliamentary Private Secretary to Judith Hart, the Paymaster General, and served as Parliamentary Under-Secretary of State for Scotland during the 1974–1979 Labour government, dealing with home affairs, housing and agriculture and fisheries. After Iceland expanded its claimed fishing territory to 200 nautical miles, Brown joined the MP for Grimsby, Tony Crosland, as British negotiator with Iceland during the third Cod War, in 1976–77. Brown was praised for the role he played in resolving the dispute both by the Prime Minister, Harold Wilson, and by the Icelandic Government.

He survived a reselection challenge by a Militant candidate before the 1983 general election, and retired before the 1987 general election. His successor, Jimmy Wray, was also closely challenged by Militant. In later life, he was a director of Margaret McIver Limited, which owned a ballroom and market in Glasgow. In retirement, he enjoyed playing golf and listening to jazz, particularly Django Reinhardt.

His wife died in 2000. He died in Glasgow in 2008, and was survived by his daughter.

Parliament of the United Kingdom
Preceded by William Reid	Member of Parliament for Glasgow Provan; 1964–1987	Succeeded by Jimmy Wray
Political offices
Preceded by Hector Monro, Alick Buchanan-Smith, and Teddy Taylor	Parliamentary Under-Secretary of State for Scotland; 1974–1979; With: Harry Ewing and Frank McElhone	Succeeded by Alex Fletcher, Russell Fairgrieve, and Malcolm Rifkind
