= Glasgow Baillieston (UK Parliament constituency) =

UK Parliament constituency (1997–2005)

- Former burgh constituency for the House of Commons
- Subdivisions of Scotland: Glasgow City council area

1997–2005
- Seats: One
- Created from: Glasgow Shettleston; Glasgow Provan
- Replaced by: Glasgow East

Glasgow Baillieston was a burgh constituency of the House of Commons of the Parliament of the United Kingdom. It elected one Member of Parliament (MP) using the first-past-the-post voting system.

Created for the 1997 general election, it took 54% of its voters from the previous Glasgow Shettleston constituency and 46% from the Glasgow Provan constituency. It included the areas of Easterhouse, Carmyle, Swinton, Baillieston, Garrowhill, Barlanark, Queenslie, Greenfield, and Garthamlock.

In 1997, the addition of much of the Shettleston constituency increased the notional majority of the previous Provan MP, Jimmy Wray, to 14,165 (40.7%) over the SNP.

The seat was succeeded by Glasgow East in 2005.

== Boundaries ==
The City of Glasgow District electoral divisions of Baillieston/Mount Vernon, Garthamlock/Easterhouse, and Greenfield/Barlanark.

== Members of Parliament ==
Election	Member	Party
1997	Jimmy Wray	Labour
2005	constituency abolished	

== Election results ==
=== Elections of the 2000s ===
General election 2001: Glasgow Baillieston
Party	Candidate	Votes	%	±%
Labour	Jimmy Wray	14,200	61.0	−4.7
SNP	Lachlan McNeill	4,361	18.7	−0.4
Conservative	David Comrie	1,580	6.8	−0.9
Scottish Socialist	Jim McVicar	1,569	6.7	+3.7
Liberal Democrats	Charles Dundas	1,551	6.7	+2.9
Majority		9,839	42.3	−3.3
Turnout		23,261	47.2	−15.0
Labour hold		Swing		

=== Elections of the 1990s ===
General election 1997: Glasgow Baillieston
Party	Candidate	Votes	%	±%
Labour	Jimmy Wray	20,925	65.7	
SNP	Patsy J. Thomson	6,085	19.1	
Conservative	Malcolm G. Kelly	2,468	7.7	
Liberal Democrats	Sheila J. Rainger	1,217	3.8	
Scottish Socialist	Jim McVicar	970	3.0	
Referendum	John McClafferty	188	0.6	
Majority		14,840	46.6	
Turnout		31,853	62.2	
Labour win (new seat)				
