= Ancient Egyptian pottery =

Pottery in hieroglyphs
N29 D21 V28 X1 W22
qerhet (qrḥt)
Pottery
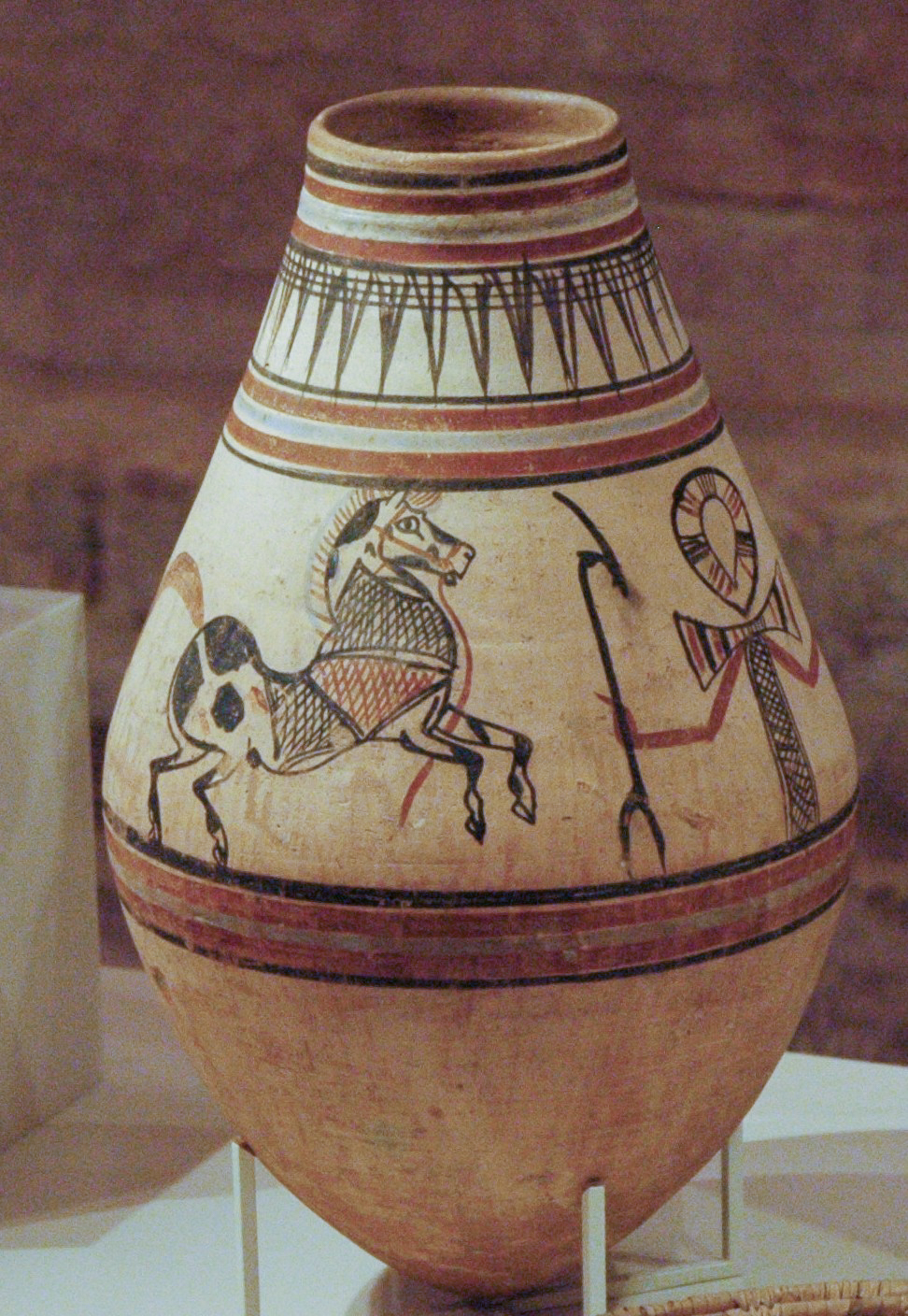
- Pot with depiction of a galloping horse from the 18th Dynasty (white background style)

Ancient Egyptian pottery includes all objects of fired clay from ancient Egypt. First and foremost, ceramics served as household wares for the storage, preparation, transport, and consumption of food, drink, and raw materials. Such items include beer and wine mugs and water jugs, but also bread moulds, fire pits, lamps, and stands for holding round vessels, which were all commonly used in the Egyptian household. Other types of pottery served ritual purposes. Ceramics are often found as grave goods.

Specialists in ancient Egyptian pottery draw a fundamental distinction between ceramics made of Nile clay and those made of marl clay, based on chemical and mineralogical composition and ceramic properties. Nile clay is the result of eroded material in the Ethiopian mountains, which was transported into Egypt by the Nile. This clay has deposited on the banks of the Nile in Egypt since the Late Pleistocene by the flooding of the Nile. Marl clay is a yellow-white stone which occurs in limestone deposits. These deposits were created in the Pleistocene, when the primordial waters of the Nile and its tributaries brought sediment into Egypt and deposited in on what was then the desert edge.

Our understanding of the nature and organisation of ancient Egyptian pottery manufacture is based on tomb paintings, models, and archaeological remains of pottery workshops. A characteristic of the development of Egyptian ceramics is that the new methods of production which were developed over time never entirely replaced older methods, but expanded the repertoire instead, so that eventually, each group of objects had its own manufacturing technique. Egyptian potters employed a wide variety of decoration techniques and motifs, most of which are associated with specific periods of time, such as the creation of unusual shapes, decoration with incisions, various different firing processes, and painting techniques.

An important classification system for Egyptian pottery is the Vienna system, which was developed by Dorothea Arnold, Manfred Bietak, Janine Bourriau, Helen and Jean Jacquet, and Hans-Åke Nordström at a meeting in Vienna in 1980.

Seriation of Egyptian pottery has proven useful for the relative chronology of ancient Egypt. This method was invented by Flinders Petrie in 1899. It is based on the changes of vessel types and the proliferation and decline of different types over time.

== Material ==
Understanding of the raw material is essential for understanding the development, production, and typology of Egyptian ceramics. In Egyptian archaeology the distinction between Nile clay and marl clay is fundamental. Mixtures of the two types of clay can be seen as a third group.

=== Nile clay ===
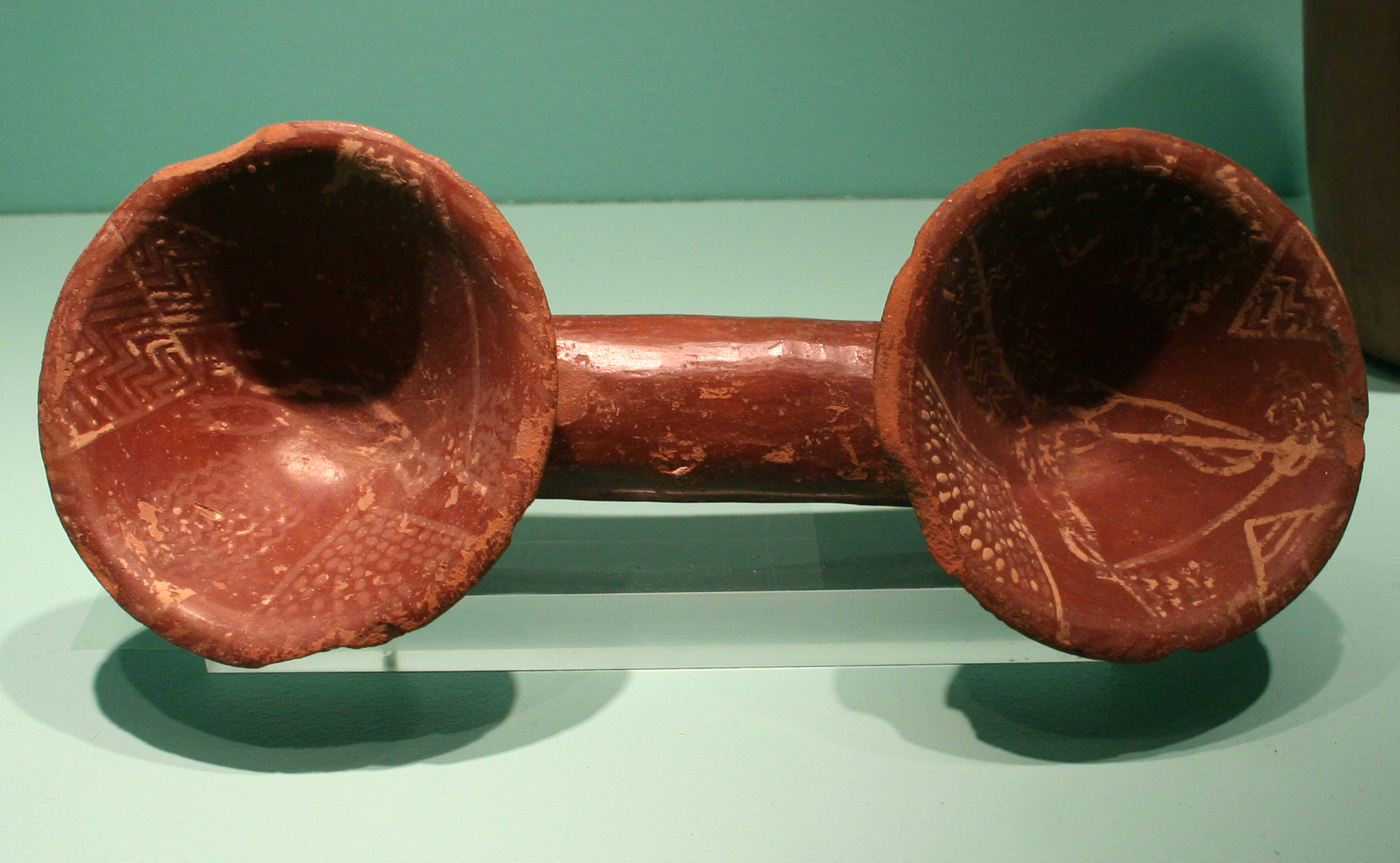
Glazed vessel made from Nile clay, with white painted details (White Cross-lined style)

Nile clay is the result of eroded material in the Ethiopian mountains, which was transported into Egypt by the Nile. This clay was deposited on the banks of the Nile in Egypt since the Late Pleistocene by the cyclic Nile floods. As a result, deposits can be found far from the modern floodplain as well as within the level covered by the flood in modern times. Chemically, the clay is characterised by high silicon content and a high level of iron oxide. Mineralogically, it is micacaeous, illite-rich sediment clay, containing many different sand and stone particles brought from the various contexts through which the Nile flows. The clay turns a red or brown colour when it is fired in an oxygen-rich oven. When unfired, it varies in colour from grey to nearly black.

=== Marl clay ===
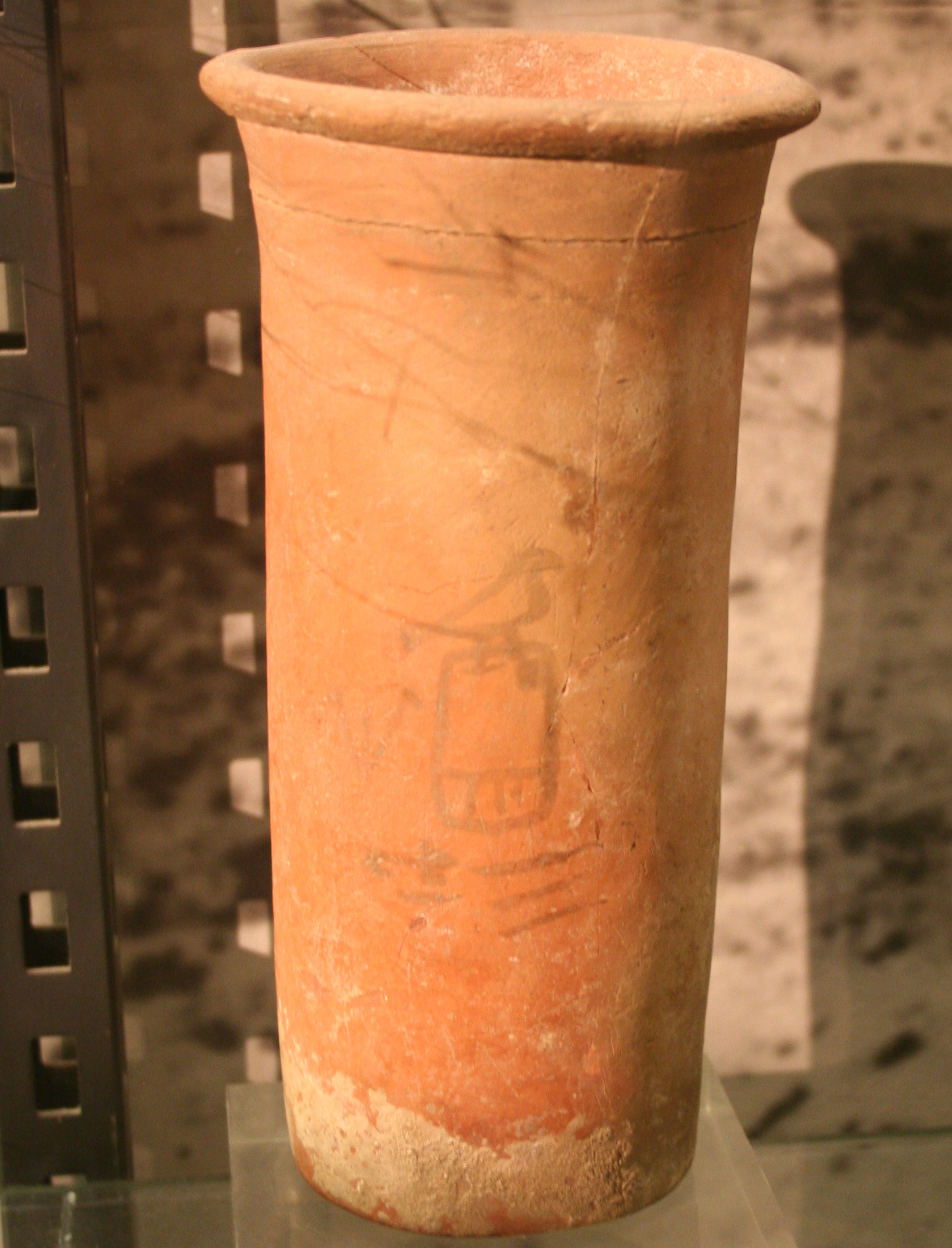
Cylinder vessel made from marl clay, from the 1st dynasty

The marl clay (or 'desert clay') is found along the Nile valley, from Esna to Cairo, in the oases and at the edges of the Nile Delta. It is a yellow-white stone, which is found in limestone deposits. The deposits were created in the Pleistocene, when the original Nile river and its tributaries deposited this clay in what had previously been desert. Marl clay includes a range of kinds of clay based on their base substance. In general, they have a lower percentage of silica and significantly higher calcium content. The most important sub-types of marl clay are:

- Qena clay: secondary deposits like that at Wadi Qena. This clay comes from sediments which were washed down the wadi and mixed with local slate and limestone.
- Marl clay from slate and limestone which is found along the Nile between Esna and Cairo.

Marl clay is normally cream or white in colour when it is fired in an oxygen-rich oven. Cuts can reveal pink or orange areas. It is rich in mineral salts, so the outer surface often has a thin layer of weathered salt which forms a white surface layer when fired, which can be mistaken for a 'glaze' by the unwary. At higher firing temperature (c. 1000 °C), this layer becomes olive-green and resembles a green glaze.

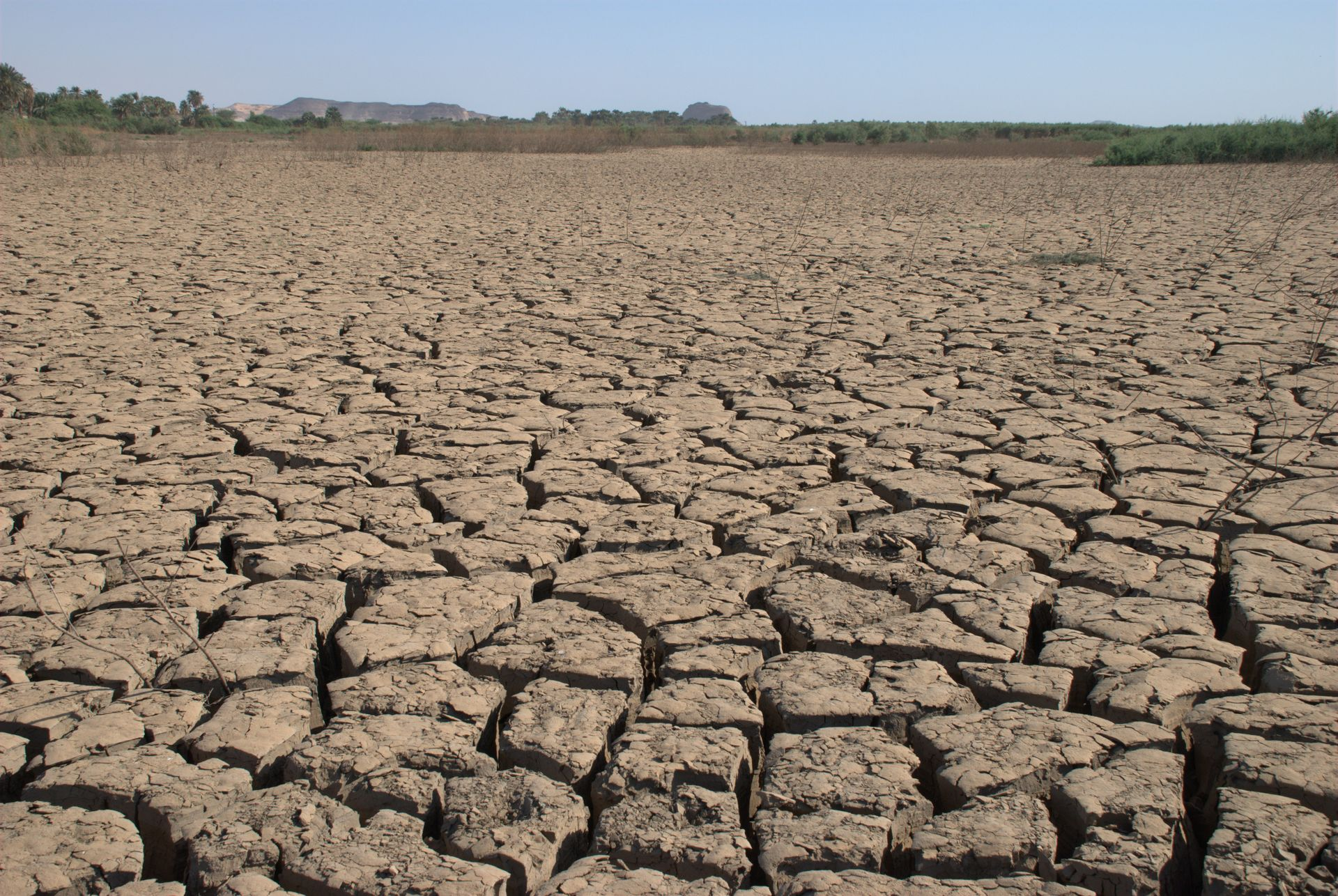
Dry, clay-filled Nile mud, in an area near Karima, Sudan which is flooded annually.

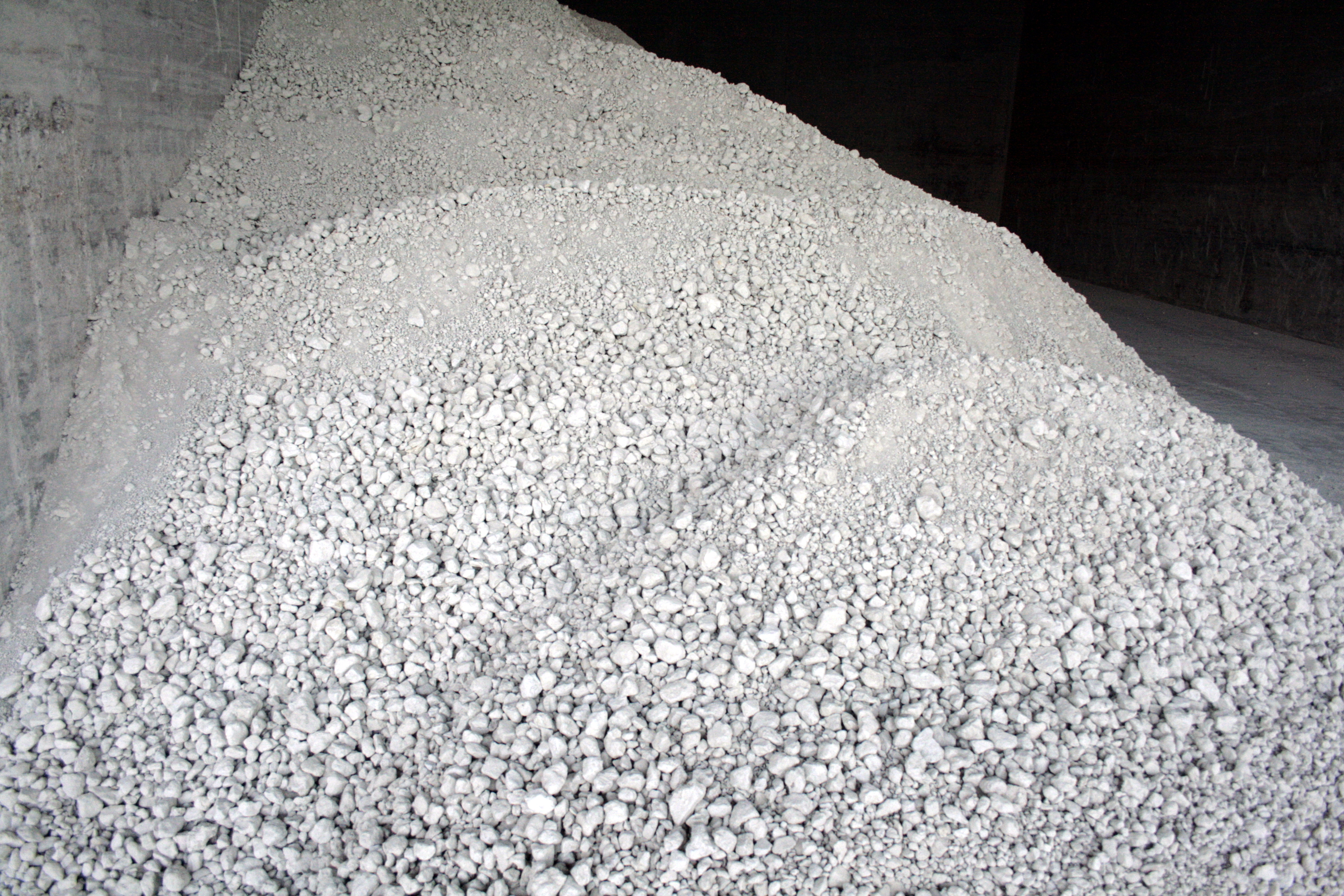
Mineral clay after collection

== Production ==
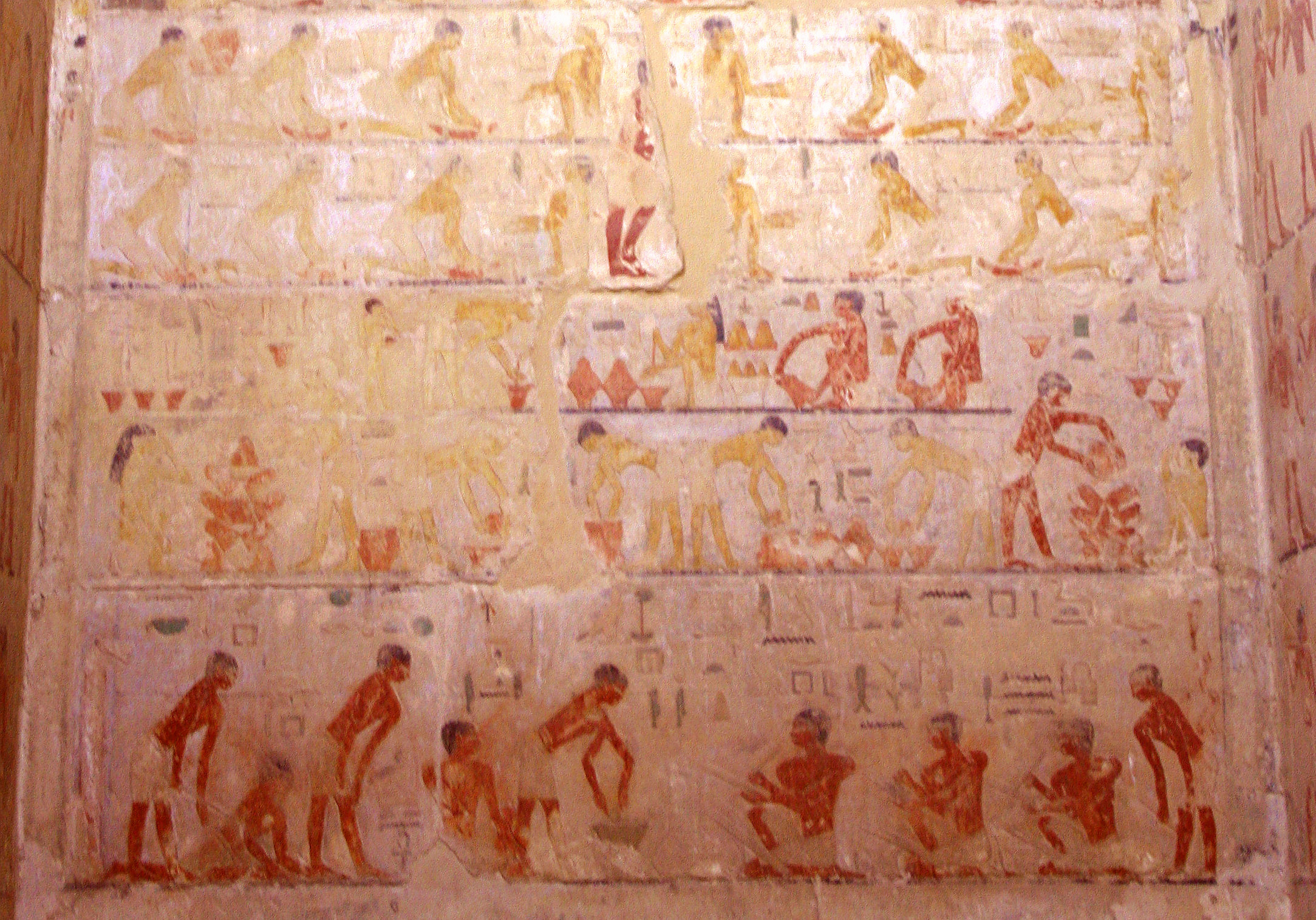
Depiction of ceramic production in the Old Kingdom, Mastaba of Ti

=== Selection of material ===
The selection of material was based on local conditions and the function of the object being manufactured. Nile clay was principally used for household crockery and containers, as well as ceramics for ritual use. Marl clay was principally used for storage and prestige objects like figural vessels.

=== Gathering the clay ===
There is little precise information on how and where Egyptian potters got their raw material, how clay pits were run, how it was transported and how it was assigned to individual potters. In general, it seems that the clay came from three different places: the shore of the Nile or irrigation canals, the desert near the fields, and the hills of the desert itself. A depiction in the tomb of Rekhmire (TT100) shows workers in the process of building up pile of Nile mud with hoes in order to make mudbricks. Clay for pottery production might have been gathered in a similar way. The scene also shows that Nile clay did not absolutely have to be taken from the fields. Piles of Nile clay were built up in the process of digging irrigation canals - as still happens today.

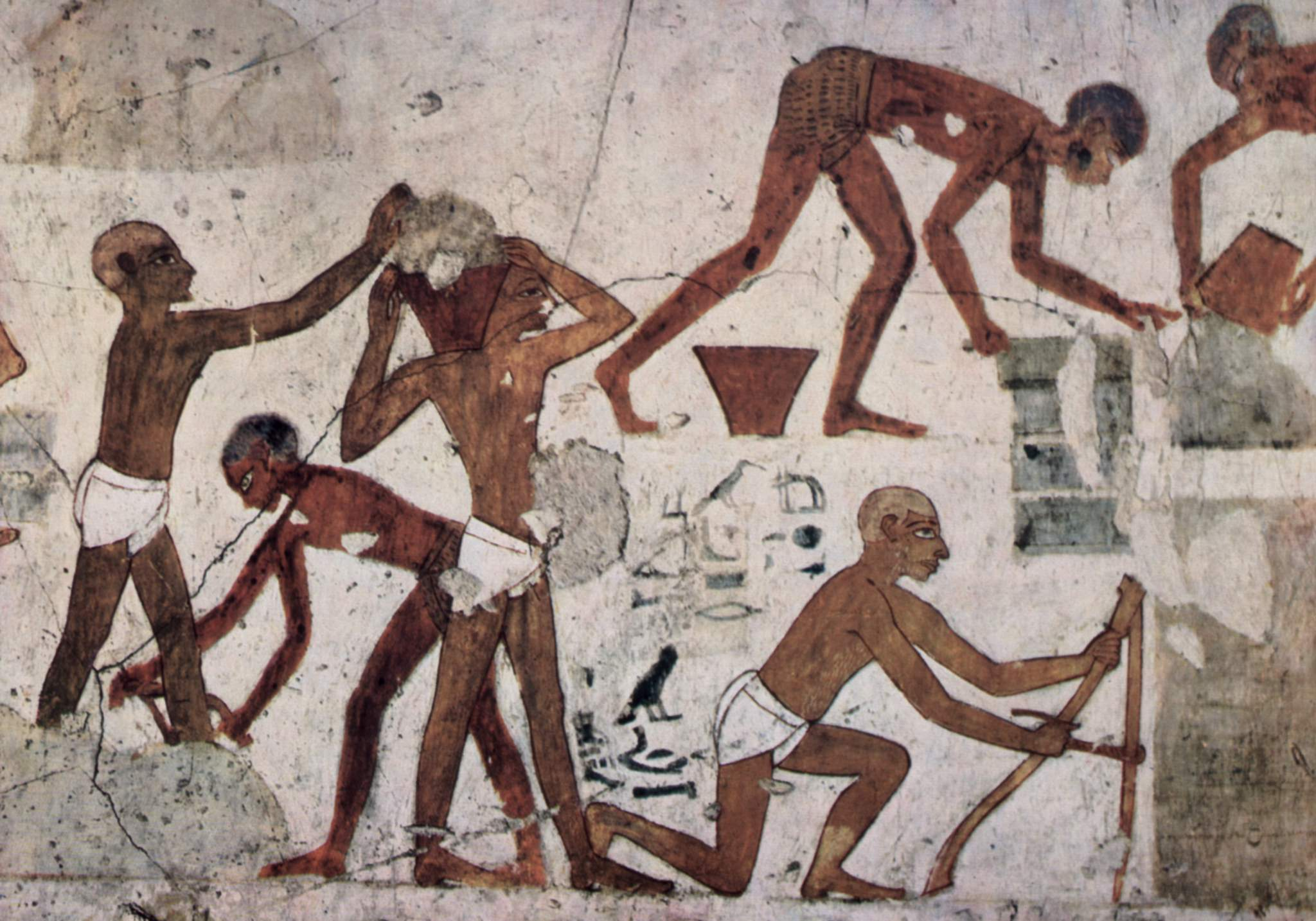
Gathering Nile mud in order to make mudbricks.

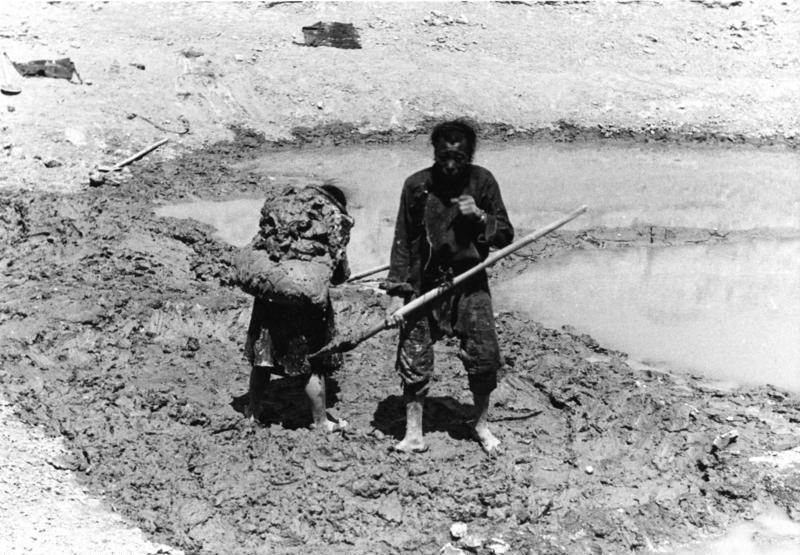
Use of hoes to gather loess in Tibet (photo from 1938)

=== Preparation of the clay ===
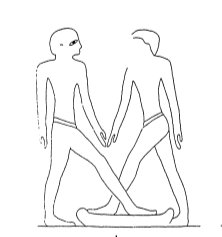
Working up the clay, in an image in a tomb in Beni Hasan from the Middle Kingdom (Tomb of Baket III.)

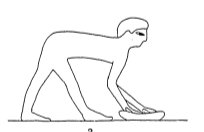
Kneading the clay, Beni Hasan (Tomb of Baket III)

Egyptian tomb paintings often show the preparation of the clay. There are also models which provide some other details. Clear archaeological remains of pottery workshops, however, are rare. It is possible that they were very ephemeral structures.

Clay which is exposed to air, dries very quickly. As a result, clay often reached the potter as dry, stony clumps (especially the marl clay from the desert) which first had to be cleaned and mixed with water in order to make it possible to shape it. The raw clay was also dried and crushed in order to remove any large impurities, like stones, by passing it through a sieve. Another possibility was the elutriation of the clay by repeatedly immersing hard clay pellets in water and skimming the fine clay off the top. There is no evidence for such a process in the pottery workshop in Ayn Asil (Dakhla Oasis), but there is some possible evidence at Hieraconpolis. This elutriation would have to have been carried out in one or more pits or watering holes. Even before these finds, the depictions of potters in the tomb of Kenamun (TT93) had been interpreted as depicting elutriation in a watering hole. At least for the clay used in Meidum-ware in the Old Kingdom and the remarkably homogeneous Nile clay used from the beginning of the 18th dynasty, some kind of refining technology must have been used.

Standard images show one or two men involved in preparing the clay, once they had softened it, by treading it with their feet in order to turn it into a malleable mass. At this stage, the clay might be supplemented with temper, if it was decided that it did not already contain sufficient fine impurities, like sand. It was important that these not be too big or sharp, "excessively large temper can make the walls of pottery vessels unstable, since the clay will not be able to mesh together properly. Sharp particles, like stones, could hurt the potter when kneading the clay and forming the vessels and prevent the creation of a smooth surface." Through the addition of balanced temper, the clay could be made "more malleable and stable during production, and also more porous, which made it easier to dry, bake, and use the finished vessel."

After the clay had been mixed with water it would be full of air bubbles. To prevent cracking during the firing process, the clay had to be kneaded. In this process, two halves of a lump of clay were beaten against one another with significant force. In the tomb paintings, a worker in a bent position is shown working the clay with his hands before handing the kneaded balls directly over to the potter.

=== Shaping ===
There were five different techniques for shaping clay in ancient Egypt:

- by hand
- using a rotatable pilaster
- using a potter's wheel operated by one of the potter's hands
- using a mould
- on a rapidly spinning potter's wheel, operated by an assistant or the potter's foot.

Characteristic of the development of ceramics is that, although new methods were developed over time, they never entirely replaced older ones. Rather, they expanded the repertoire, so that at the high point in the history of Egyptian pottery, each type of object had its own manufacturing technique.

==== Hand-shaping ====
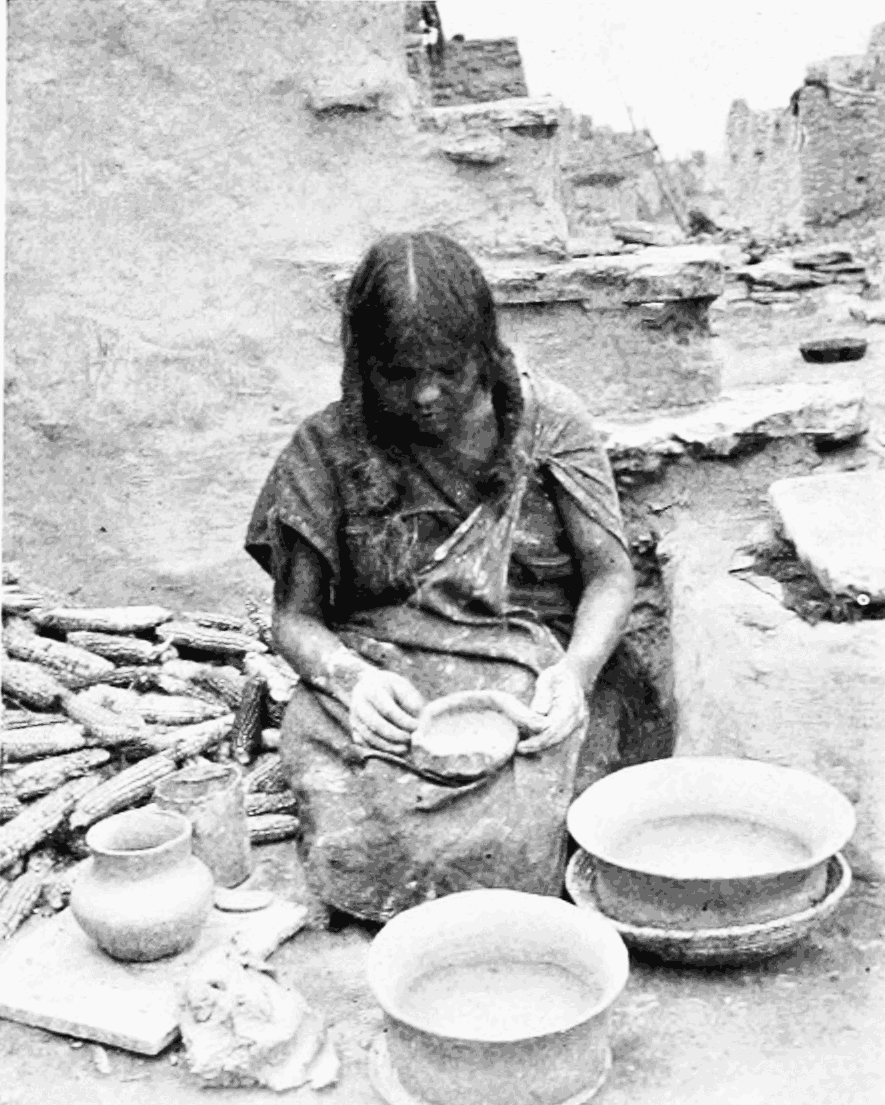
Hopi woman making clay coil pottery (photo from 1899)

There were several different techniques for making pottery by hand: stacking a number of coils on a flat clay base, weaving, and free modelling. These three techniques were used from the predynastic period until at least the Old Kingdom.

Free modelling by kneading and pulling at the clay with the hands is the oldest and most enduring technique for shaping clay. It was employed for all vessels in the Faiyum A culture, in the Merimde culture, and probably also in the Badari culture. In the Old Kingdom, it was used for the most important types and it was used for figures and models in all periods. The resulting product had thick walls. The technique is recognisable by pressure marks where individual bits of clay have been pressed together.

In the weaving technique, flat rectangular pieces of clay were woven together. The technique can be recognised by the fact that the broken vessels tend to form rectangular sherds. The technique seems to have come into widespread use in early Egypt, from the time when larger pottery vessels began to be made at the latest. Throughout the whole Pharaonic period and down to Roman times, large basins and tubs were made using this technique.

In the clay coil method, a series of coils of clay were stacked one on top of the other to form the walls of a pot. This technique is seen in late predynastic pottery from Heliopolis.

==== Rotating pilaster ====
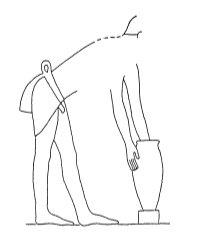
Creation of a vase using a rotating pedestal, from a depiction in the Mastaba of Ti

During the Chalcolithic, the rotating pilaster came into use for the manufacture of ceramics. This may have arisen from the desire to make the body and especially the opening of the vessel being made symmetrical. The technique can be clearly recognised from a horizontal rotation mark in the opening of the vessel. Unlike the potter's wheel, there was no fixed axis around which rotations were centred.

The pilaster used in this technique could by a bowl, plate, basket, mat, textile, or even a pottery sherd. This pilaster was rotated along with the vessel, as the potter shaped it. The rotation technique was used only for the creation of the vessel's shell. The earlier techniques were also used for other parts of the manufacturing process. Thus, on finished vessels, traces of free modelling are found, especially in the lower parts, but the edges were turned after the completion of the whole vessel.

==== Hand-operated potter's wheel ====
An important advance was the invention of the potter's wheel, which rotated on a central axis. This enabled the potter to rotate the wheel and the vessel with one hand, while shaping the vessel with the other hand.

According to Dorothea Arnold, the slow potter's wheel was invented some time during the Fourth Dynasty. Eva Christiana Köhler has subsequently argued that this should be corrected to a substantially earlier period, "the invention of the potter's wheel is a development which generally accompanied a certain form of mass-production. It enabled standardisation and the rapid production of finished vessels." According to her, this development can clearly be traced back to the mass-produced conical bowls of the Mesopotamian Uruk culture at Habuba Kabira.

In production, first, a large clay cone was shaped on the disc. The peak of the cone was the actual point of rotation, around which the bowl was to be formed. It was then sliced off with a wire or a cord. The resulting bowls had a relatively thick wall near the base and marks from rotation and pulling on the underside of the base. Christiana Köhler detected such marks on vessels of the predynastic period, which makes it fairly likely that the slow potter's wheel was in use in this period.

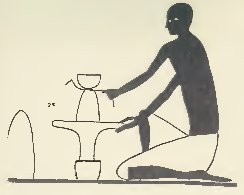
Creation of a vessel on a hand-operated potter's wheel

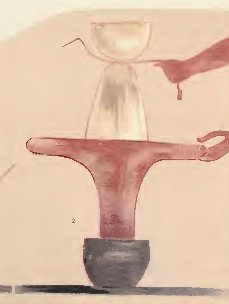
Swiveling potter's wheel

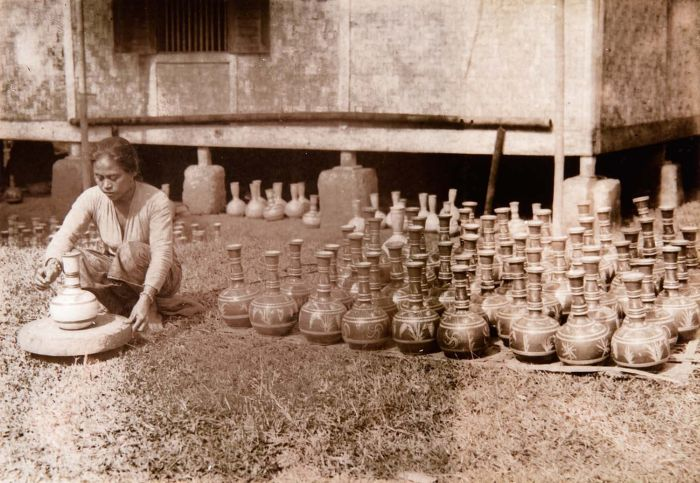
Creation of potter with a potter's wheel in Indonesia (c. 1930)

==== Mold ====
It is assumed that baking pans for conical bread were made with the help of a mold. It is possible that they were shaped around a conical wooden core, which had the shape of the conical bread which would eventually be baked in the pans.

==== Fast potter's wheel ====
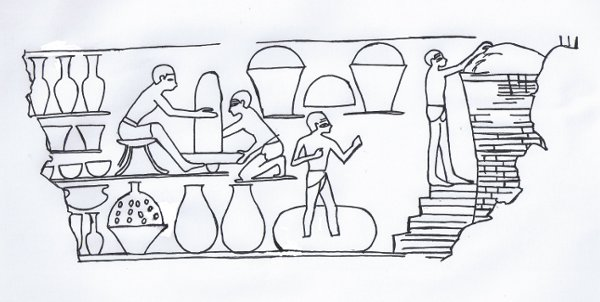
Depiction of ceramic production from the New Kingdom grave of Kenamun.

Manufacture on the fast potter's wheel, operated by an assistant or the foot of the potter was a relatively late development, which took place in the New Kingdom at the earliest. The earliest depiction comes from the Tomb of Kenamun from the middle of the Eighteenth Dynasty, in which an assistant grips the wheel and thereby helps the potter to use the wheel, while the potter himself uses his foot to stabilise it.

=== Surface treatment ===
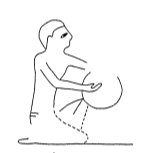
Shaping the round base of a bowl in a depiction from Beni Hasan

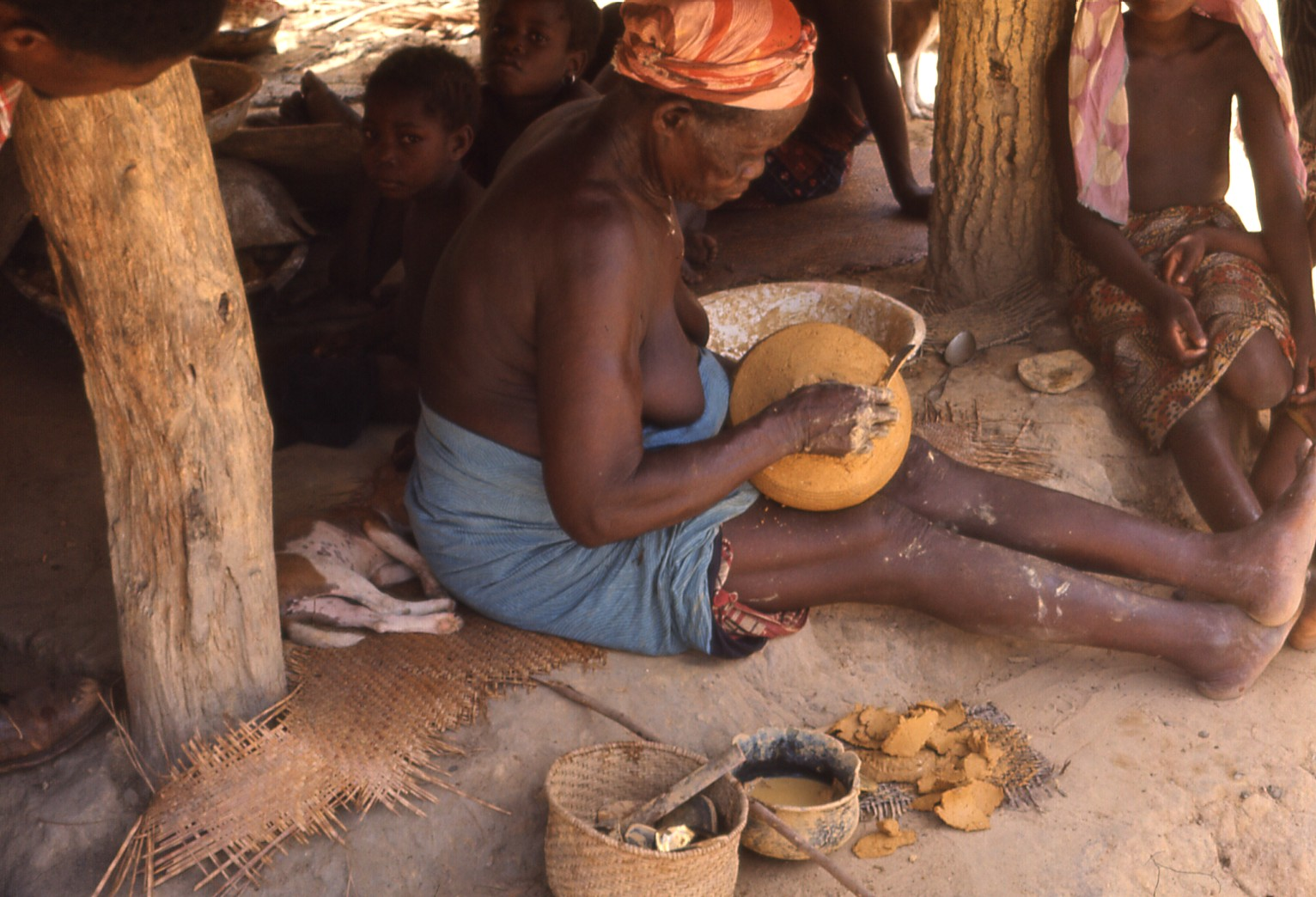
Scraping away excess clay on the base of a pottery vessel. Photo of ceramic production in Liberia in 1968.

The shaped vessel first had to be dried enough that the walls would be stable for further work. The clay was brought to roughly the consistency of leather, remaining damp enough that it could still be moulded and shaped. At this point paint, glaze and slip could be added if desired. After further drying the vessel was polished. There were two techniques for polishing the vessel's surface:

- Polishing by rubbing without pressure produced a consistent, light sheen. Examples include jugs from the Old Kingdom, jugs and dishes from the First Intermediate Period and possibly the Middle Kingdom.
- Polishing with a burnish or significant pressure on the vessel's surface. This results in very shiny surfaces, but only in rare cases of especially careful work (such as Meidum bowls of the Old Kingdom) are no polishing marks left behind. In the Thinis period and the Seventeenth and Eighteenth dynasties, potters made decorative patterns with the marks left by this polishing process.

At this stage, impressions or incisions could also be made in the clay, "when the clay was still damp enough that it would not break in the process, but was dry enough that no raised areas would be left in the incisions." This was done with various tools, including bone or wooden nails, combs made from bone or shellfish, and flint knives.

After an initial drying phase, the round base was finished. This was done by hand until the seventeenth dynasty, using a flat tool to cut and smooth the base. A foot was also cut by hand, or molded from an additional lump of clay. After the beginning of the seventeenth dynasty, the foot was instead made on the potter's wheel from the mass of clay used for the creation of the base of the vessel. At this point, bases and stands increasingly have rotation marks on the outside.

=== Drying ===
In the drying process, the vessel had to be kept under controlled conditions, such that all parts of the vessel dried equally and no shrinking took place. In this process, a lot of water had to evaporate, since the remaining water would boil at the beginning of the firing process, which led the water vapour to expand in volume, leading to explosions if it could not escape.

The vessel was left to dry in direct sunlight when the light was weak, in the shade when it was strong, or in a closed room when it was raining or cold. The drying process could take several days, depending on the humidity, the size, wall-thickness, and porosity of the vessel. Even when drying was complete, vessels remained between 3-5% saturated with water, which was only expelled during the firing process.

=== Firing ===
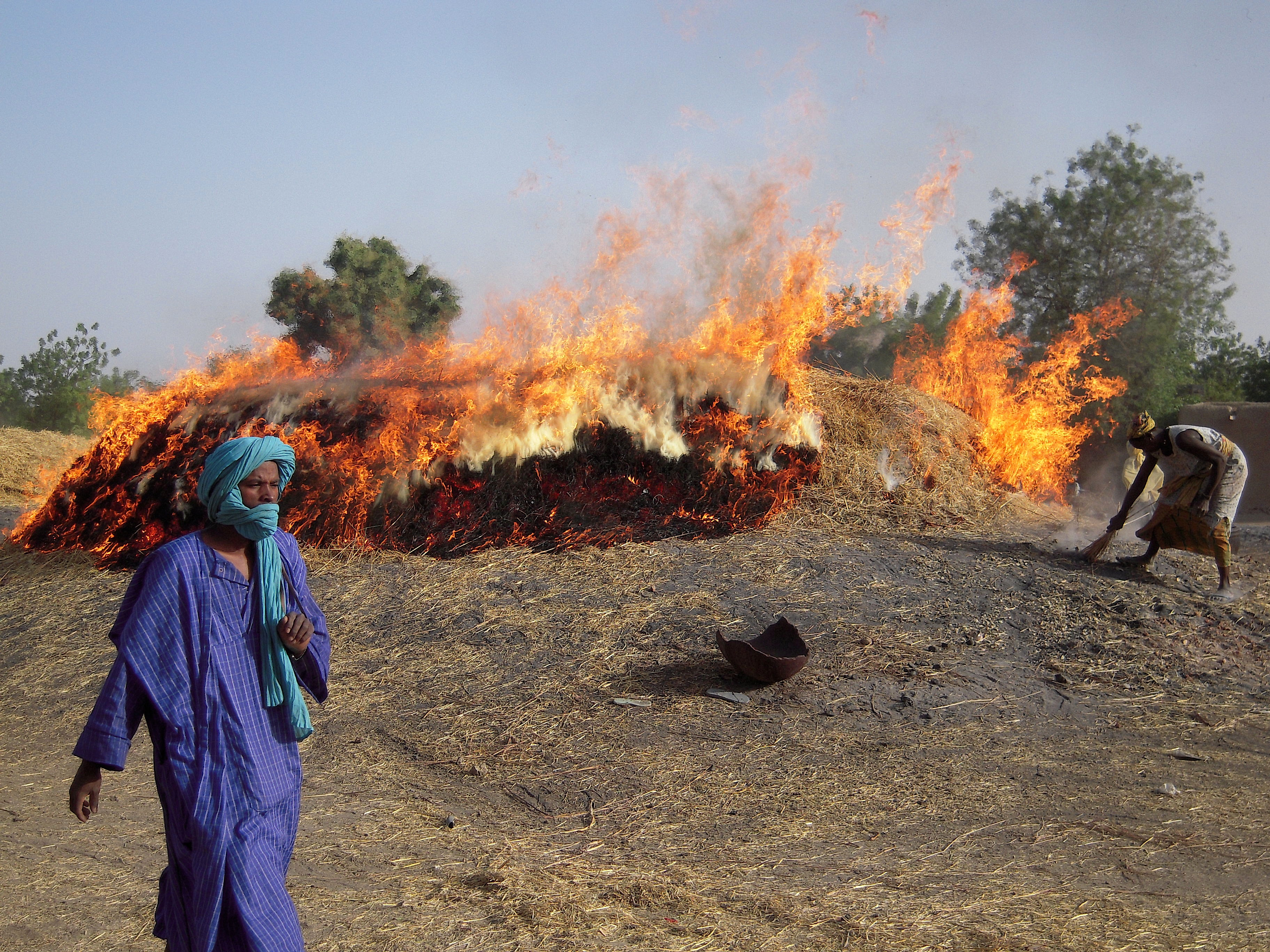
Firing pottery on an open fire in a village on the Niger in Mali (photo from 2009).

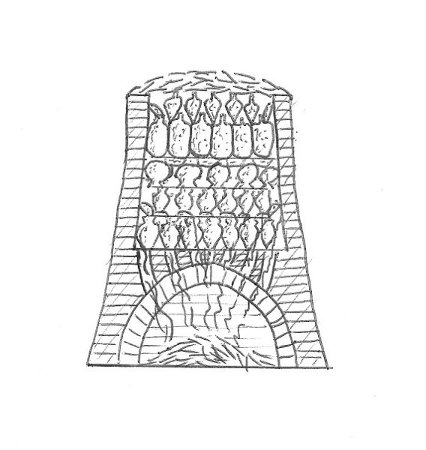
Reconstruction of a kiln in Thebes, New Kingdom

In the firing process, the clay is transformed from a malleable material to a rigid one. Up to this point it is possible to make the clay malleable again by making it wet. After firing, damaged vessels, like misfirings, are nearly unfixable.

In order for the transformation of the clay into this final and moisture-less form, it must be heated to a temperature of 550–600 °C. Before this, at around 100 °C, residual moisture escapes into the air and at 300 °C the chemically bonded water of crystallization also escapes. The supply of oxygen during the firing process is critical, since it is used up as the fuel is burnt. If more is not supplied (e.g. through a vent), an atmosphere rich in carbon monoxide or free carbon will develop and it will create a black or brown-black iron(II) oxide, which gives the fired pottery a grey or dark brown colour. This is called a reducing firing. In an oxidating firing by contrast, a continuous supply of oxygen is maintained. The iron in the clay absorbs oxygen and becomes the red or red-brown iron(III) oxide. The resulting pottery has a red-brown colour.

The simplest and earliest firing method is the open fire. The vessel to be fired is covered and filled with flammable material. It is placed on a flat piece of ground, surrounded by a low wall, or put in a pit. During the firing process, the potter has relatively little control. The vessel is in direct contact with the flames and the fuel, which heats quickly and then cools down again quickly.

Optimisation of the firing process became possible once the pottery was placed inside a chamber with a vent and separated from the fuel of the fire, i.e. a kiln. This technological leap was made in the early Old Kingdom at the latest, but possibly in the Early Dynastic or late Predynastic period.

The simplest form of a kiln was a shaft with no separation of the area where the fuel was burnt from the chamber where the ceramics were placed. This could be loaded through a shaft and then set on fire through an opening on the ground. This opening enabled a continuous supply of oxygen, which could be used to create an oxidising atmosphere. The oven now had to reach a set firing temperature in order to heat the clay in the firing chamber. As a result, the fire lasted longer and burnt more consistently.

The next technological advance was the introduction of a grating, which separated the fuel from the pottery being fired. This prevented smoky flames and carbonised fuel from coming in contact with the ceramics and leaving flecks and smudges on it. The vessels being fired were placed in the upper part, with the opening underneath. The hot air rose up to the vessels and circulated around them, indirectly firing the clay. Shaft ovens of this type, with a grating, are attested in Egyptian art and by archaeology from the Old Kingdom onwards.

== Decoration ==
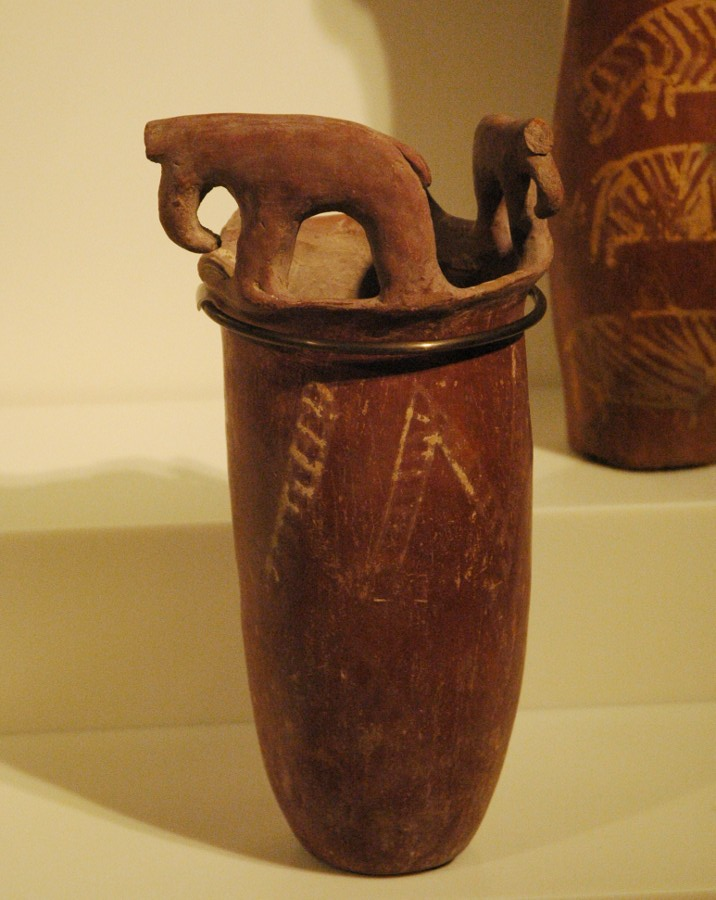
Pot with elephants on the rim from the Naqada II culture (ca. 3700–3200 BC)

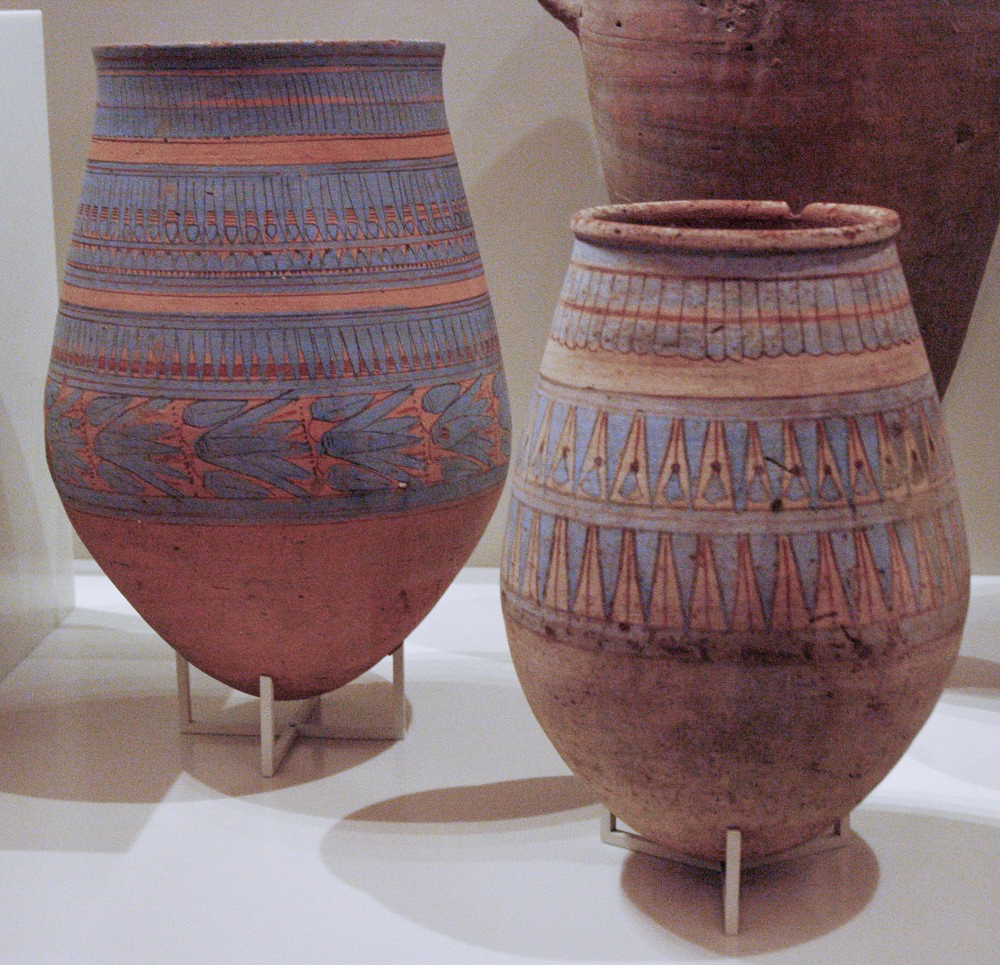
Storage vessel with blue decoration (blue-painted style) from the 18th dynasty

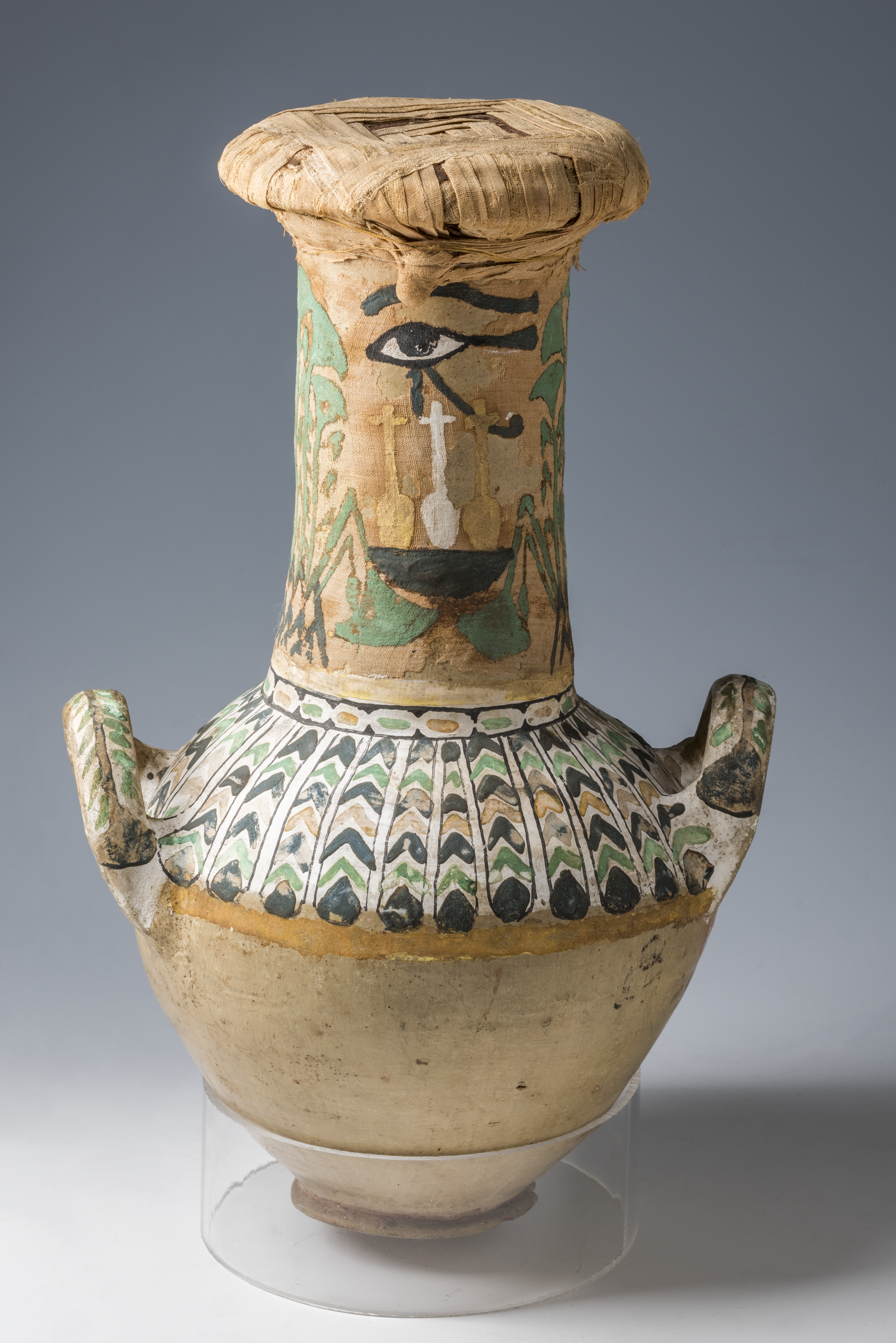
Vase with tissue and painting in the scenic style from the tomb of Kha and Merit, 18th dynasty, Deir el-Medina. Museo Egizio, Turin.

Egyptian potters employed a broad range of decorative techniques and motifs, many of which are characteristic of specific periods. There are three points in the manufacturing process in which decoration could be added: before, during, or after the firing process.

Since the predynastic period, potters added decorative elements in the molding stage, creating unusual shapes or imitating other materials, like basketwork, metal, wood or stone. The majority of the 'fancy features' were created during the process of shaping the vessel and smoothing its surfaces, long before it was fired. The elements were either shaped from a piece of clay by hand or impressed into the clay while it was still malleable - often causing fingerprints to be left on the inside of the vessel. In figural vessels, these were often parts of a human or animal body, or the face of the god Bes or the goddess Hathor. It was also common to cut out parts of the vessel in order to imitate another type of material.

Even in the earliest Egyptian pottery, produced by an early phase of the Merimde culture, there are incised decorations like the herringbone pattern. In this technique, the surface of the pot was scratched with a sharp instrument, like a twig, knife, nail, or fingernail before it was fired.

Pots fired in a firing pit often have a black upper rim. These black rims were increasingly a decorative feature, which required technical knowledge to produce consistently. In combination with a dark-red colour and polish, this black-topped ware was one of the most fashionable and popular types of pottery. The black colour was a result of carbonisation, created by the introduction of smoke particles to the oven during the firing process for example. Some aspects of this special process are still unclear.

Painted decoration could be added with a brush before or after firing. For specific patters, paint might be sprayed on the surface of a vessel, or it might be dipped in the paint. There are eight major types of painted pottery from ancient Egypt:

- Petrie's white-cross-lined style: this pottery is found only in Upper Egypt in the Naqada I culture (c. 4000–3500 BC). It s usually made from Nile clay (Nile clay A). The surface is a dark red or reddish brown and is polished. The characteristic feature of this style is the white or cream coloured painting of geometric patterns or (occasionally) animals, plants, people and boats.
- Petrie's decorated style: this pottery is typical of the Naqada II and Naqada III cultures (c. 3500–3000 BC). It is usually made of marl clay (marl clay A1). The surface is thoroughly smoothed, but not polished and its colour varies from light red to yellowy grey. Red-brown paint was used to paint a number of motifs - most commonly, ships, deserts, flamingos, people, spirals, wavy lines, and Z-shaped lines.
- White background style: this style was made in the First Intermediate Period, early Middle Kingdom, New Kingdom, and the Late Period (c. 2200–300 BC). The surfaces of this style were decorated with various colours on a white background, after firing. The decoration normally depicts carefully designed offering scenes.
- The scenic style: this style occurred sporadically in all periods. It is very similar to the white background style, except that the scenes were painted directly onto the surface of the vessel without a white background.
- The blue-painted style: this style occurred from the middle of the 18th dynasty until the end of the 20th Dynasty (c. 1500–1000 BC). It is characterised by the use of blue pigments, along with black, red and occasionally yellow. The main motif is floral decorations: lotus flowers and buds, and individual petals of various flowers, painted as if they were on a thread draped around the neck and shoulders of the vase. Depictions of young animals and symbols of Hathor and Bes are also encountered. The vessels are usually made of Nile clay.
- The brown-and-red painted style: this style developed at the beginning of the 18th Dynasty (c. 1500 BC) from the decorative use of lines in the late Middle Kingdom and Second Intermediate period. Unlike the blue-painted style, this pottery is usually made from marl clay. The style is characterised by very specific decorative patters: a group of two to four parallel lines, with various elements like dots, zigzag lines, wavy lines, and the like painted in between them. These were painted in different colours: either brown elements and red lines or vice versa.
- The lotus-flower-and-crosslined-band style.
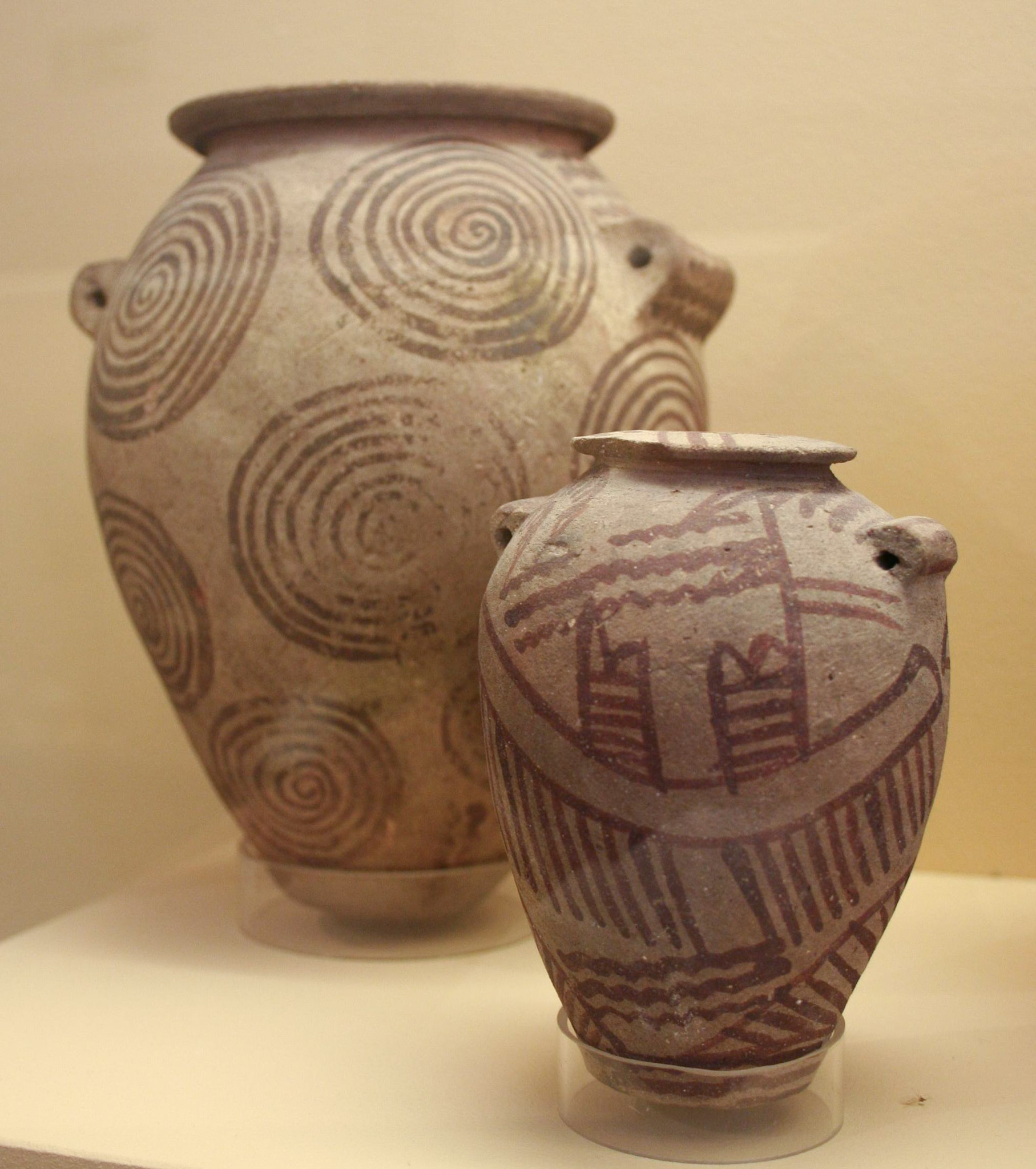
Decorated pottery vessel of the Naqada II period (Petrie's decorated style)

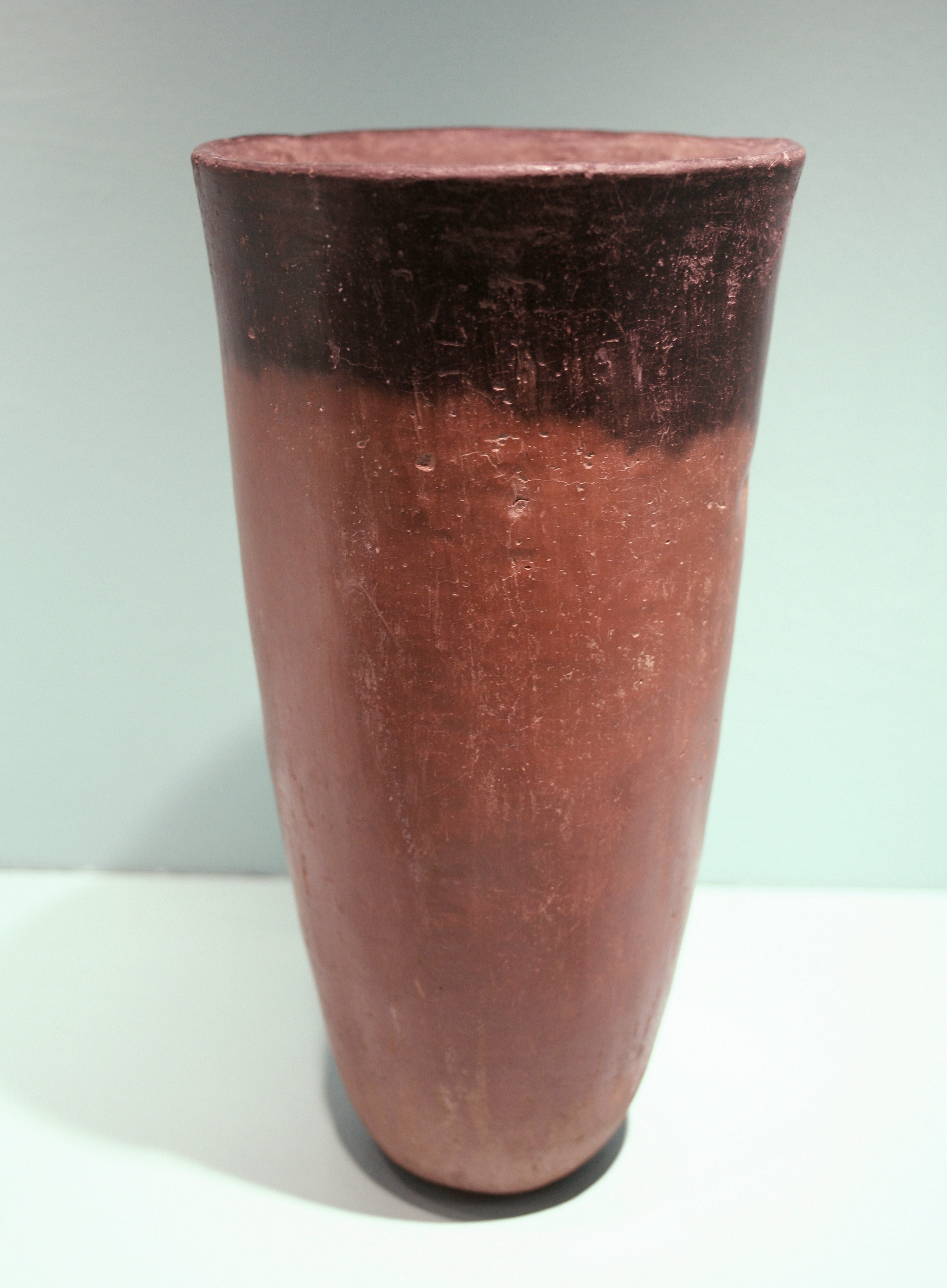
Black-Topped pottery of the Naqada I period

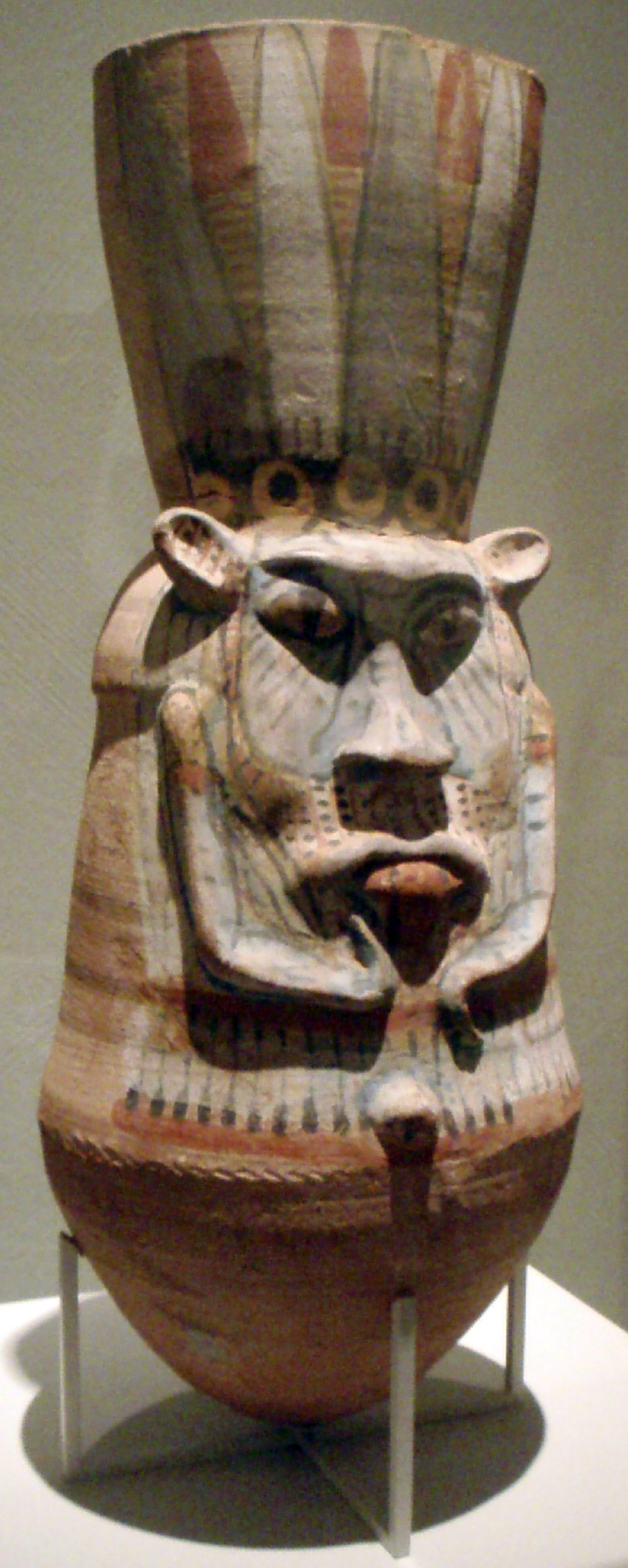
Bes pot

== Objects and function ==
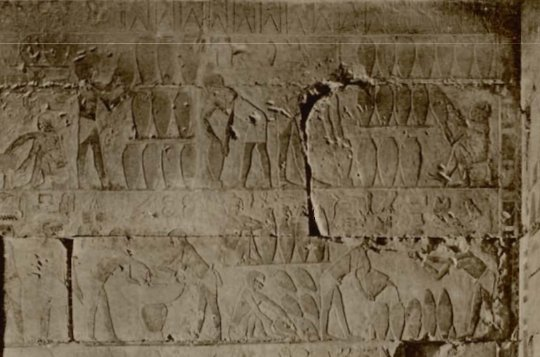
Depiction of beer production in the Mastaba of Ti, with typical beer jugs.

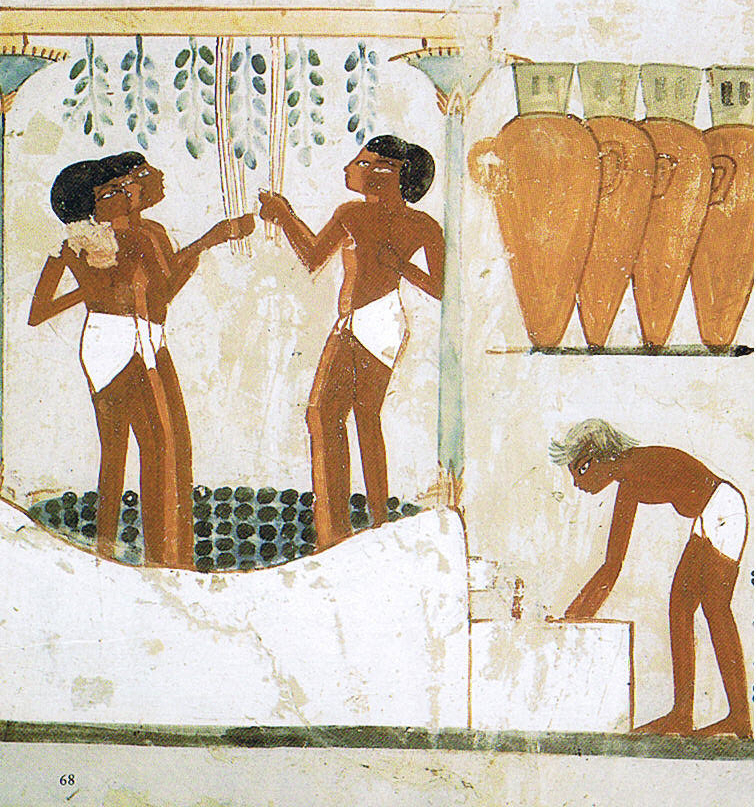
Depiction of wine production in the tomb of Nakht (TT52) with typical wine jugs

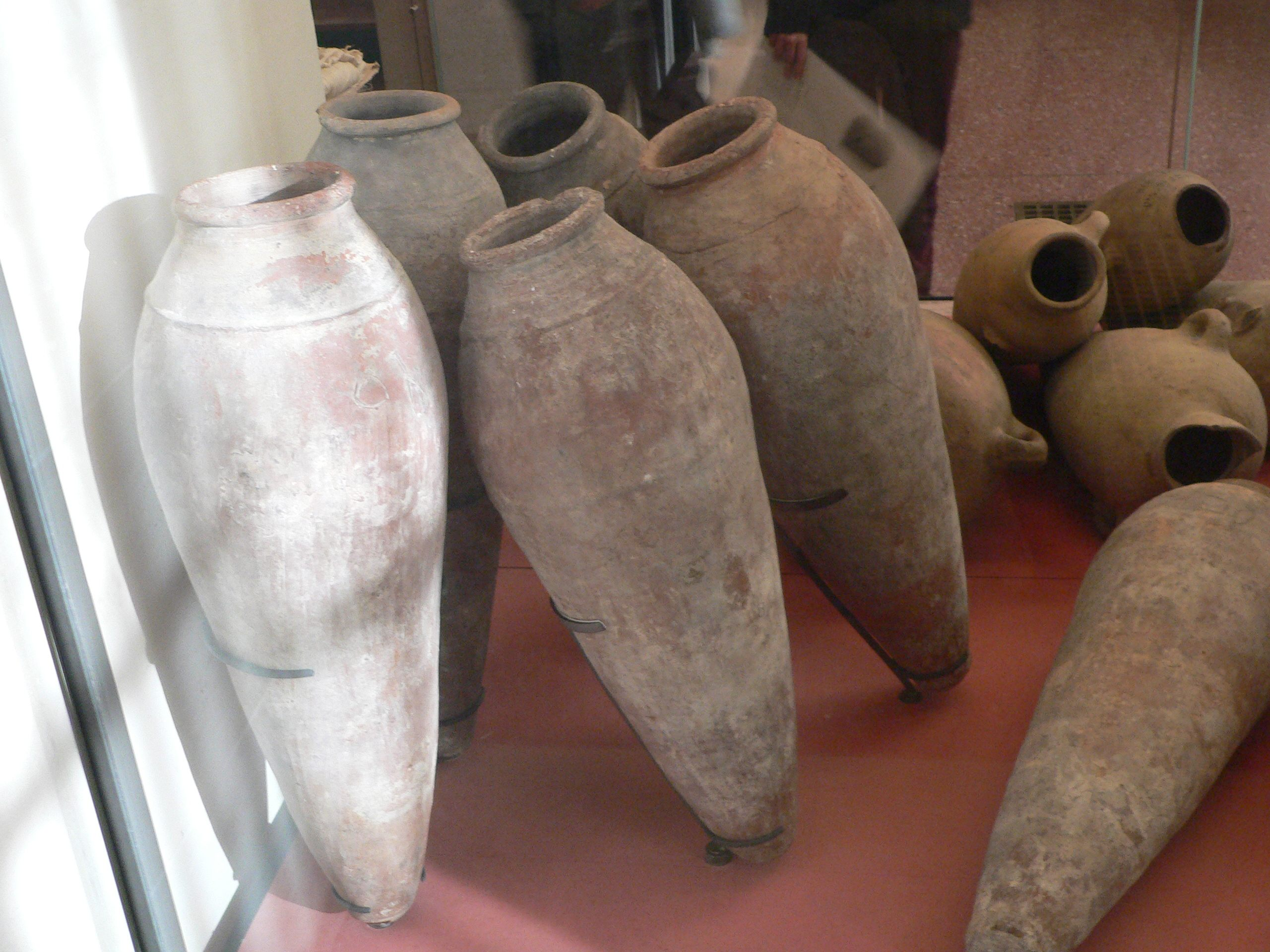
Wine jugs from Abydos, early dynastic.

In Egyptology, the term 'pottery' is used to refer to all non-figural objects made from fired clay. The majority of pottery vessels surely served as household wares and were used for the storage, preparation, transport and consumption of food and other raw materials. In addition to this, there were other objects frequently used in the household, like bread moulds, fireboxes, lamps and stands for vessels with round bases. Other types of pottery served ritual purposes. Sometimes water pipes were constructed from amphorae laid back-to-back, but actual ceramic water pipes were only introduced in the Roman period. Musical instruments, like rattles, could also be made from ceramics, in the form of bottles filled with pebbles and then sealed before being fired.

Evidence for the function of individual pottery types is given by depictions in tombs, textual descriptions, their shape and design, remains of their contents, and the archaeological context in which they are found. In tombs, pottery is often only sketched out schematically. Nevertheless, in some cases it is possible to identify the function of a vessel based on depictions in tombs. Examples include bread molds, spinning weights, and beer jugs. The shapes of beer jugs make it possible to link them with scenes of beer manufacture, such as the Mastaba of Ti: they are ovoid, round-bodied bottles, often with weakly defined lips, which are generally roughly shaped and are made of clay with a lot of organic matter mixed in.

Inscriptions giving the contents of the vessel are not unusual in the New Kingdom. As a result, wine jugs and fish kettles can be identified, although wine jugs were also used for other raw materials, like oil and honey. One of the largest finds of inscribed wine vessels came from the tomb of Tutankhamun (KV62). The inscriptions on the 26 inscribed wine jugs provide more information about the wine they contain than most modern wine labels. The year of the lees was recorded in the king's regnal years. The quality, the origin of the grapes, the owner of the winery, and the name of the vintner who was responsible for the actual product were all recorded. (See also Wine in ancient Egypt).

The vessels themselves provide evidence for their purpose, for example by the type of clay used, the treatment of the outer surface, and the shape of the vessel. Among the significant factors, is whether porosity was desirable or not. Thus, in modern water jugs like zirs and gullas, the water seeps through the walls, so that the contents can be cooled through evaporation. This effect can be best achieved with a bright clay or coating. Thus, Christiana Köhler in her study of the Early dynastic pottery from Buto was able to identify bottles or jugs with a white coating or light, large-grained marl clay, as water containers. An opposite effect could be created with a dark overcoat. By this, the pores of the outer surface were filled and the walls of the vessel were made impermeable to liquids. This made a vessel low-maintenance and hygienic, since no low-grade food residue would sick to the walls of the vessel. This can be seen, since no drink and food trays and plates can be detected.

== Social context of production ==
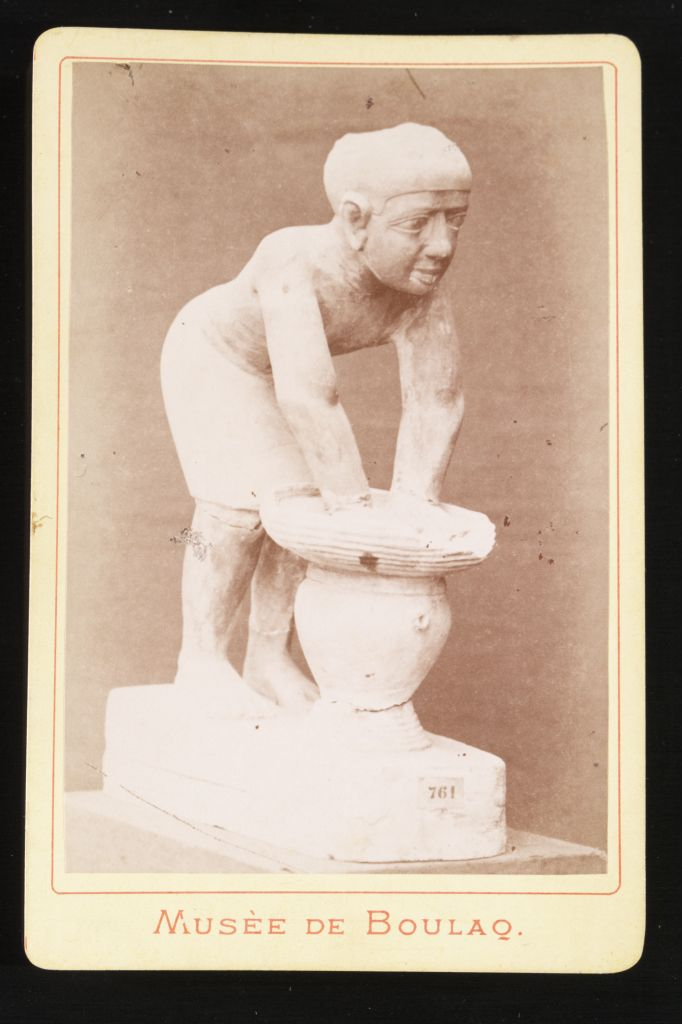
Statue of a potter

The place of the ceramic industry in the wider social and economic context of ancient Egyptian society has been treated only cursorily in research to date.

Tomb decorations and pottery models provide only a few pieces of evidence for the context of pottery production. Depictions from the Old Kingdom are closely linked with brewery and bakery scenes (although these are also depicted separately at times). This indicates that pottery production was an independent part of food production. However, the inhabitants of tombs desired food and drink in the afterlife, not empty vessels.

Models of pottery workshops from the First Intermediate period and the Middle Kingdom give only a little indication of where the production took place. In all cases they are depicted in the open air - sometimes in a courtyard. More information is offered by the Middle Kingdom scenes in the tombs at Beni Hasan. Here pottery production is shown taking place alongside other crafts, like carpentry, metal-working, textile production, and the manufacturing of stone vases - and much less frequently with food production. This trend continues in the only depictions we have from the New Kingdom, in the tomb of Kenamun in Thebes.

The models only ever show one or two men at work, which might indicate that production was carried out on a small scale. In almost all depictions, the works are male. There are a few examples from the Old Kingdom of women participating in the production process, e.g. helping to load the kiln. Little is known about the individual workers, but they were surely of low social status. That they were not part of higher society is also indicated by the absence of epigraphic evidence for this vocation. This is also illustrated by the Satire of the Occupations:

The potter is beneath the earth,

although his lifetime is beneath the living.
He rummages in the mud more than pigs,
in order to burn his pots.
His loincloth is stiff from the clay,
his belt is a rag.
The air in his nose,

actually(?) comes from his kiln.

— Satire of the Trades

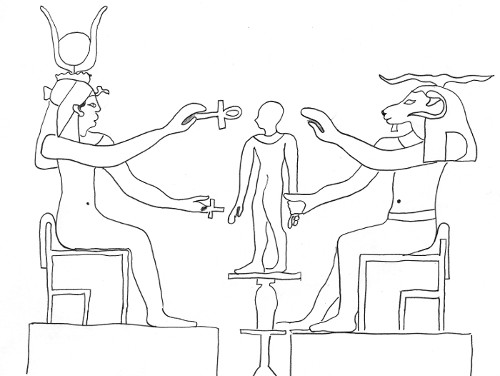
The ram-headed potter god Khnum makes the divine child Ihy (Horus/the king) on a potter's wheel and Isis-Hathor fills him with life.

On the other hand, pottery production had an important place in Egyptian culture. As part of everyday life it belonged to a level where perfection did not matter. From that point of view it was less about social stratification than about a stratification of the value which people attach to things. It would therefore be wrong to say that Egyptian potters were despised. There was a strong sense that the process was a creative one. Thus, the word for 'potter' (qd) is the same one used for 'building' walls and structures. Even the activities of creator gods were depicted using the image of the potter. The ram-headed creator god Khnum was shown creating gods, men, animals and plants on the potter's wheel. This suggests high esteem for ceramic production.

Stephan Seidlmayer investigated the social and organisational circumstances of pottery production in the transitional period from the Old Kingdom to the Middle Kingdom, asking how the archaeological evidence can be connected to the image of the historical situation which we have built up from other sources. He concludes that the economic situation in the Old Kingdom favoured a centralised, standardised, and specialised production in great quantities, using complicated procedures. The organisational capacity of the state enabled focused production with high-quality pottery suitable for storage and transport in the context of the extensive distribution of goods by a centralised system. In the late Old Kingdom and the First Intermediate period, the centralised system deteriorated. It was replaced by decentralised production in small quantities for the circulation of goods within relatively small areas. In order to achieve high output, it was necessary to compromise on the quality of the wares. The profound transformation of the archaeological material indicates the extent of the social transformation which affected the whole cultural system at this time.

== Economic context of production ==
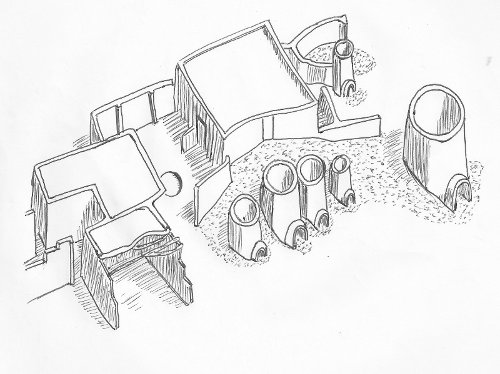
Reconstruction of a pottery workshop from Ayn-Asil of the First Intermediate Period

E. Christiana Köhler has shown that a non-industrial system of pottery production, based in individual households, developed in late predynastic Buto in particular, as a result of the unfavourable climatic conditions of the Nile Delta. At the same time, specialisation can already be seen in pottery production in the late Naqada I and early Naqada II cultures in Upper Egypt, where the typical pottery found in settlements is a simple, tempered, weak Nile-clay pottery (Rough ware). However, the typical red ware for cemeteries, the Red-polished and Black-topped ware, was made entirely differently: "whereas the rough ware of the settlements was fired at only c. 500-800 °C, temperatures of up to 1000 °C were used for the red wares." Although the red ware had a fine-grained, thick fabric, it was only occasionally tempered and it required a controlled firing process. This situation suggests that two different systems of manufacture already existed: a professional, specialised industry making funerary pottery and household production of rough wares.

The environment of Upper Egypt seems to have been more conducive to specialised pottery production. In densely settled areas like Hierakonpolis and Naqada, there was also heavy demand for pottery. "In the course of Naqada II, a society developed in Upper Egypt which placed significant value in their burials and the grave goods that they included in them, so that the demand for high-value pottery quickly increased." Only for funerary pottery does there seem to have been any demand for professional pottery, since the fine wares are regularly found in graves and very rarely in settlement contexts.

The best archaeological evidence for pottery production is provided by kilns:

- Even in the predynastic period, pottery production in Hierakonpolis had reached amazing heights. Fifteen kiln complexes have been identified. The excavated kilns are not very technologically advanced, but they produced at least three different kinds of ware in many different forms for both household and funerary use.
- In the late 5th or early 6th Dynasty, pottery was manufactured in the Mortuary temple of the Pyramid of Khentkaus II in Abusir. It was a small worship, dated rather later than the actual establishment. Inside the temple, there was a manufacturing area, a storage space and a kiln. Possibly vessels were manufactured here for cult purposes.
- Near the mortuary temple of Menkaure at Giza, an industrial area has been excavated, which included kilns. Mark Lehner also identified possible locations for the mixing of the clay. All food production and pottery production was subordinate to worship.
- In Elephantine, there were kilns outside the walls of the city, which were established in the Old Kingdom. They date to the middle of the 4th C BC, through to the early 5th century BC, and were part of a substantial industry.
- The best example of a workshop in a settlement context, comes from Ayn Asil in the Dakhla Oasis. These workshops produced pottery from the end of the Old Kingdom into the First Intermediate Period and were located outside the settlement's walls, like the kilns in Elephantine. It is estimated that they were operated by teams of five to ten workers, working with a wide variety of clays and producing a number of different forms. The presence of bread moulds in these workshops led the excavators to conclude that there was no household pottery production in the community, since these would be the most likely things to be produced in individual households. However, not all the city's needs were met by this production and only a little locally produced pottery was found in the city's cemetery.
- In Nag el-Baba in Nubia a pottery workshop has been uncovered, which was active from the 12th Dynasty to the Second Intermediate Period. It was a compound with several rooms, including some for the preparation of the clay and one with a 'simple' oven. Some tools were also identified, including probable fragments of a potter's wheel.
- Several kilns have been identified in Akhenaten's capital city of Amarna, as well as traces of both industrial and household pottery production.
- Remains of workshops from about the same time as those at Amarna have been found at Harube in north Sinai. They were located outside the settlement, near the granaries and contained areas for preparing the clay and for kilns. They fulfilled the demand of nearby garrisons and official convoys passing through the area.

== Classification and analysis ==
Various methods have been developed in archaeology for the classification of Egyptian pottery. The most important is called the Vienna system. This system is based on the following terms:

- Fabric: this indicates the type of clay, and whether it consists of a combination of types of clay and temper or additives.
- Form: this includes changes to the mixture introduced by the potter, such as temper-additives and surface treatments.
- Ware: this can encompass a number of different styles with the same clay-mixture.
- Fracture/fracturing: this refers to the assessment of the way in which sherds break.

=== The Vienna system ===
The 'Vienna System' is a classification system for Egyptian pottery, which was developed by Dorothea Arnold, Manfred Bietak, Janine Bourriau, Helen and Jean Jacquet and Hans-Åke Nordström at a conference in Vienna in 1980. All of them brought sherds from their own excavations which formed the basis for the classification system, with a few exceptions. As a result, the system is mainly based on find spots of the 'classic' periods and regions of Egypt. According to the group who developed it, the system was only intended as a departure point, a guide for the description of pottery. The classification of the various wares is based on the measurement of the size of the organic and non-organic components of the pottery fabric.

The components are divided into three groups according to their size. Mineral particles like sand and limestone are classified as fine (60-250 μm), medium (250-500 μm), and large (larger than 500 μm), while straw is categorised as fine (smaller than 2 mm), medium (2–5 mm), and large (over 5 mm). The meaningfulness of the system is limited somewhat by the caprice of the potter and a degree of accident during manufacture. The system also provides various criteria for the subdivision of Nile clay and marl clay, "thus the marl clay consists of naturally occurring geological groupings, but with Nile clay the different mixtures were created artificially." The system does not take account of surface treatment. The system is only of limited use for predynastic pottery and pottery that post-dates the New Kingdom. This shows the uncertain state of published research on these periods and the large variation in technique, distribution and raw material which occurred in both of these periods.

==== Nile clay A ====
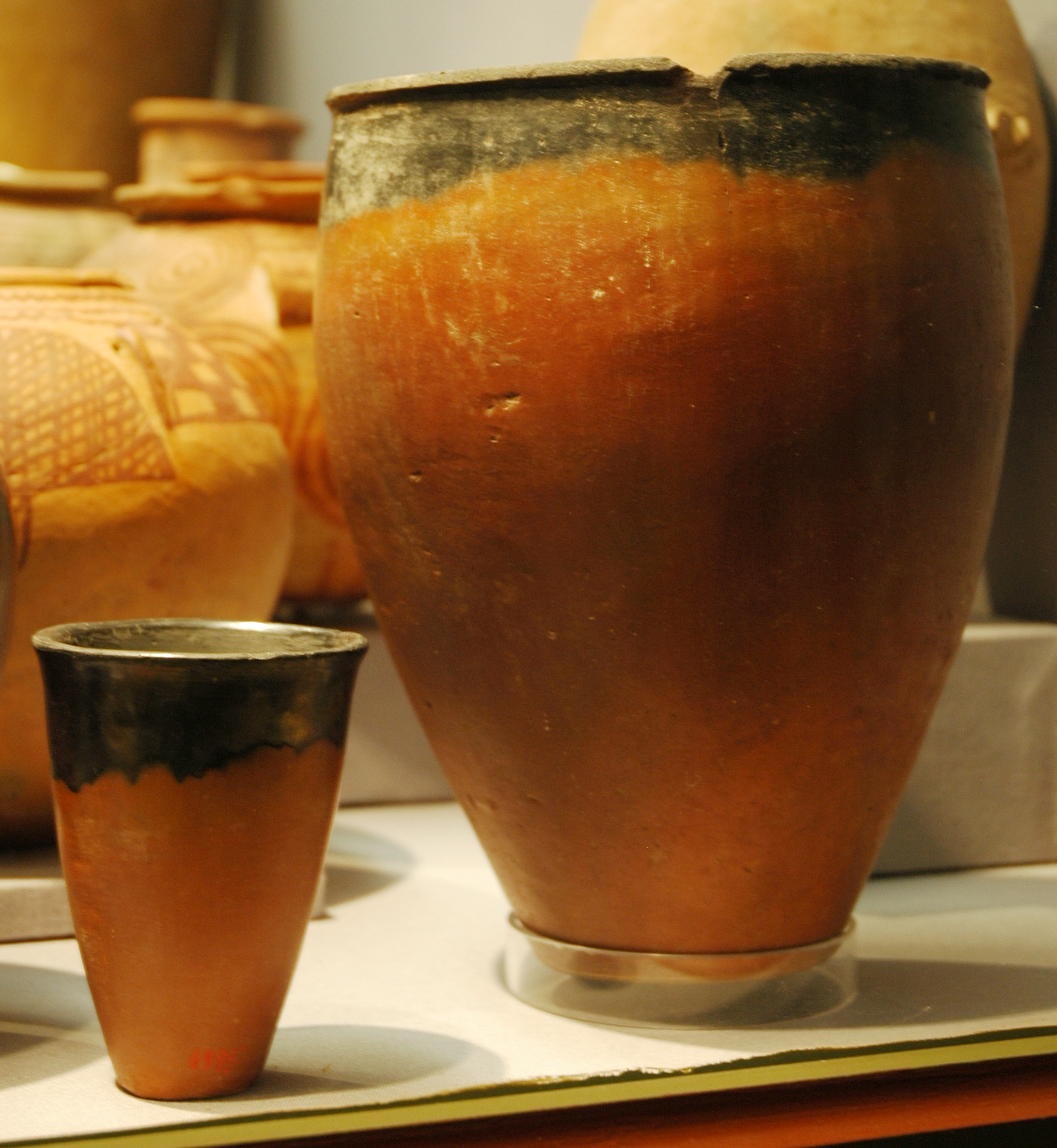
Nile clay A; Black-topped pottery; Naqada Ic-IIb

The fabric consists of a fine, homogeneous clay and a significant proportion of loam. Components are fine sand, a conspicuous amount of medium-grained sand and occasionally large grains of sand. Mica also occurs. Small amounts of tiny straw particles can occur, but they are not typical of this form. The quantity of clay and loam and the fine particles suggests that the sand is a natural component, not an addition for tempering.

==== Nile clay B ====
Nile clay B is subdivided into B1 and B2:

- B1: The fabric is relatively muddy and not as fine as Nile clay A. There is a lot of fine sand, with isolated particles of medium and large grains of sand. Mica particles are common. Isolated fine particles of straw also occur. Surfaces and incisions are often in the original red-brown, but black/gray or black/red areas can occur. This type is common from the Old Kingdom until the beginning of the 18th dynasty. It is the raw material for the spherical bowls and 'cups' of the Middle Kingdom and especially characteristic of the fine wares of the Delta and the region of Memphis-Fayyum in that period.
- B2: The fabric is similar to B1, but the mineral and organic components have larger grains and are more frequent. There are large amounts of fine sand and sand grains of medium size are common. Rounded grains of sandstone occur with limestone grains which show some signs of weathering. The demarcation between B and C is not very clear, especially between B2 and C. One aid in distinguishing them is that sand is the main additive in type B rather than straw. Unlike B1, B2 is common in all periods and regions. For example, Dorothea Arnold identified four varieties of it in Lisht-South. Manfred Bietak identified a large-grained variant from the Second Intermediate Period at Tell El-Dab'a. Other examples include the late 12th and 13th dynasties at Dahshur and the late 18th dynasty at Karnak.
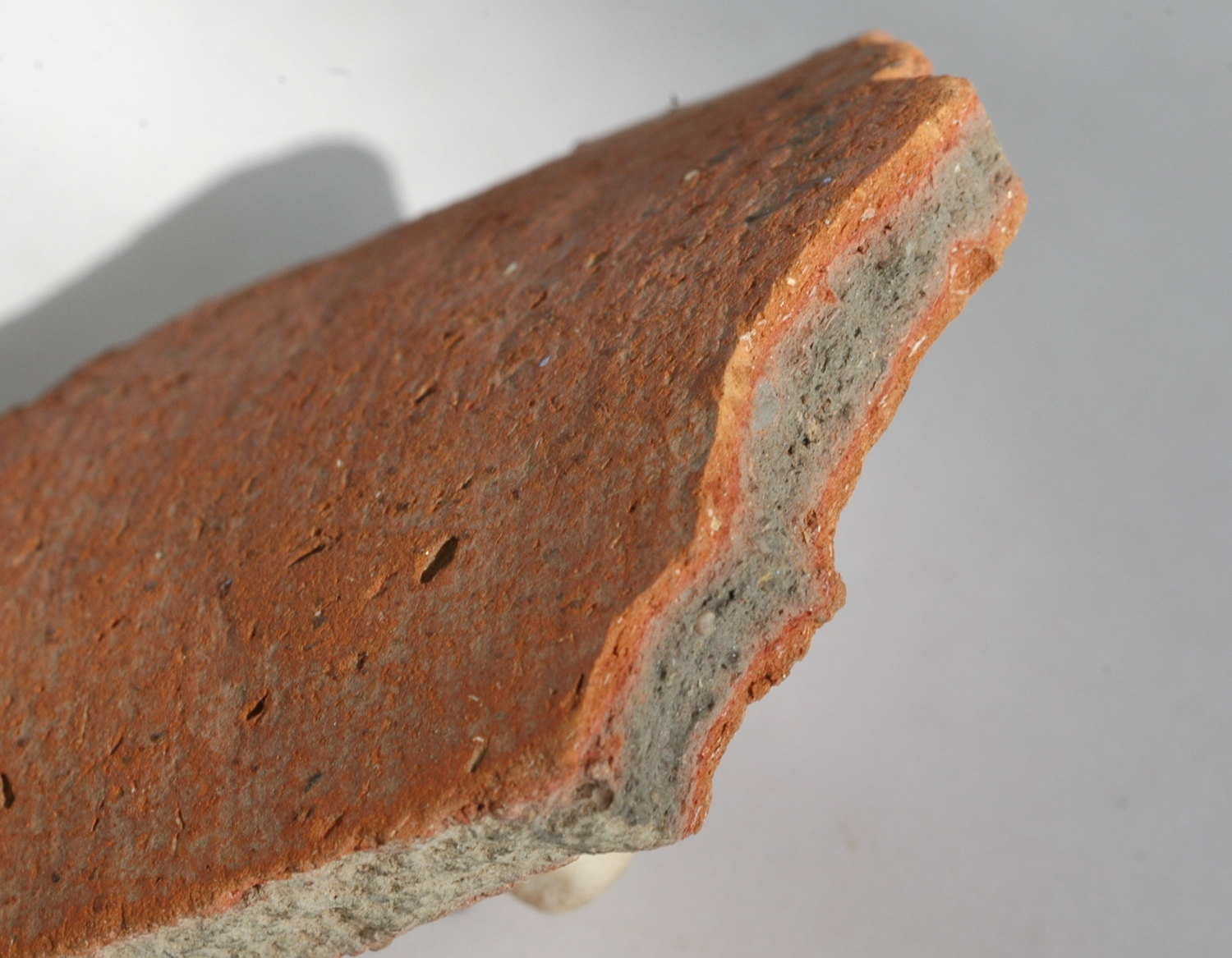
Nile clay B

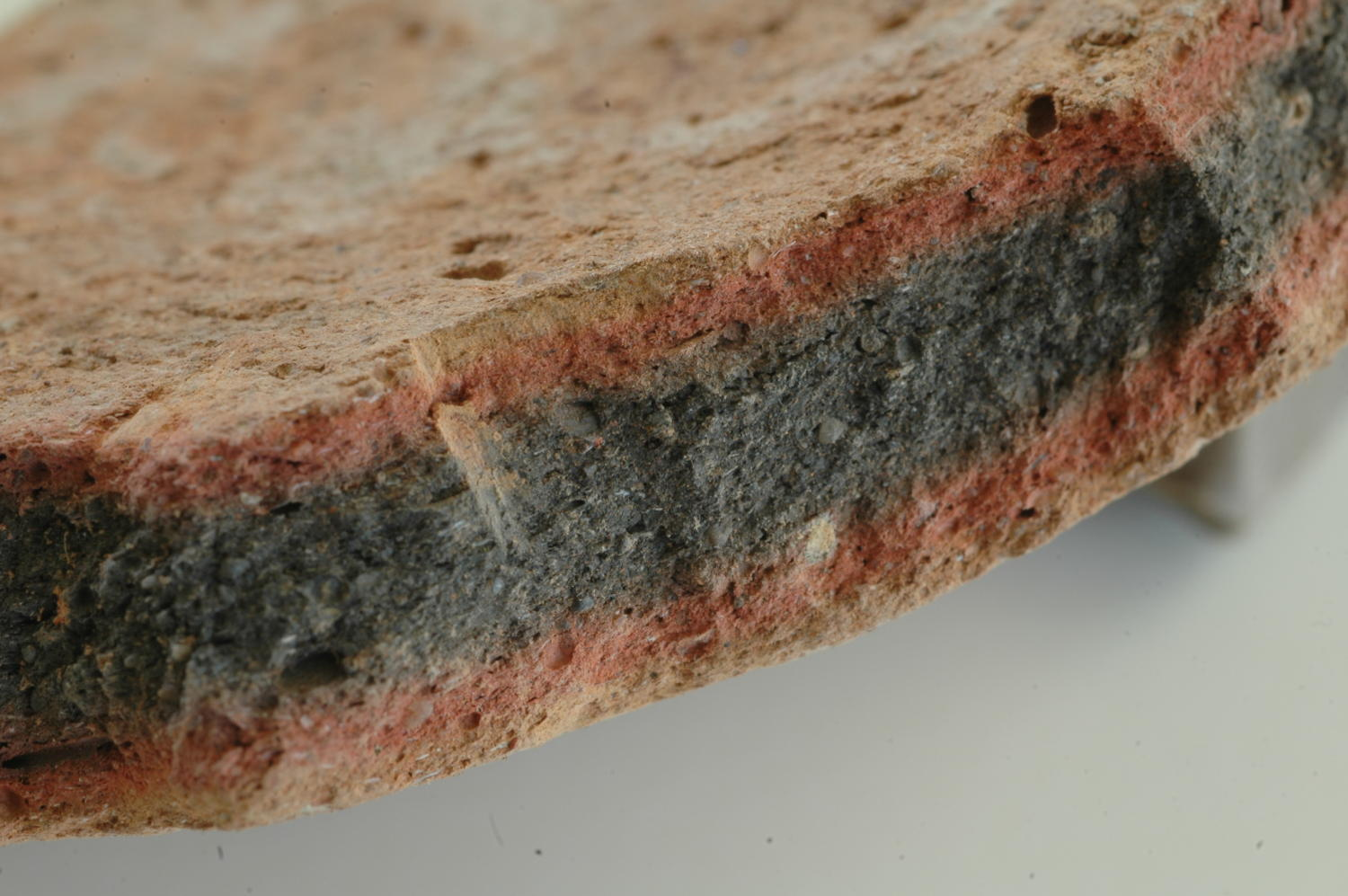
Nile clay B

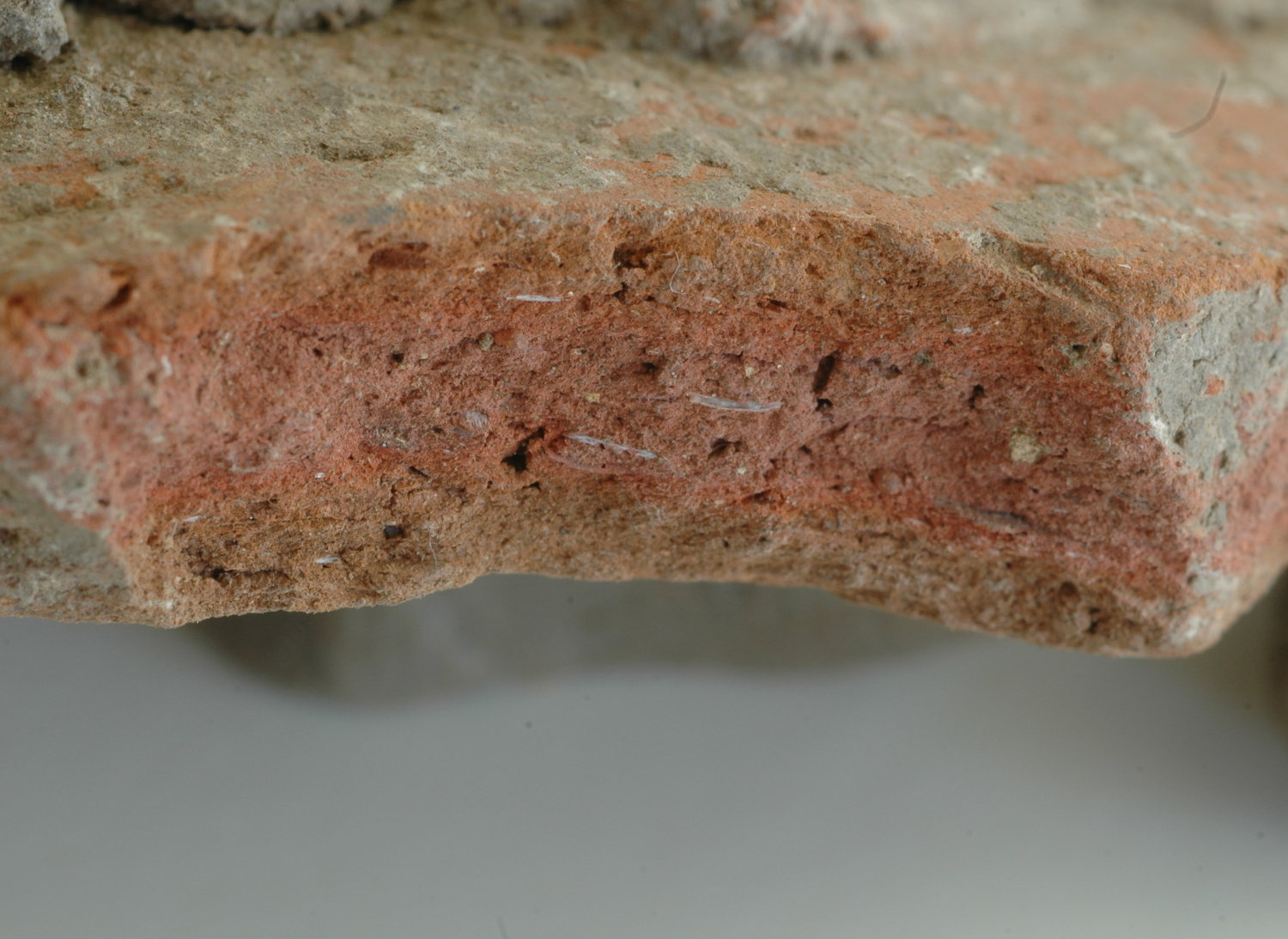
Nile clay B

==== Nile clay C ====
This material consists of muddy clay with rough or smooth grains of sand which can vary from fine to large and in frequency from seldom to often. Additives like limestone and other minerals, such as mica, crushed sherds of pottery and medium-grained stone particles, can occur. Straw is the dominant additive and is often visible in incisions and on the surface. These straw particles range from fine to large, with a large amount of large particles (over 5 mm). The straw is preserved as charred particles, appearing as white or grey silica and as impressions in the paste. Nile clay C occurs in all periods and regions, and includes a wide variety of variants.

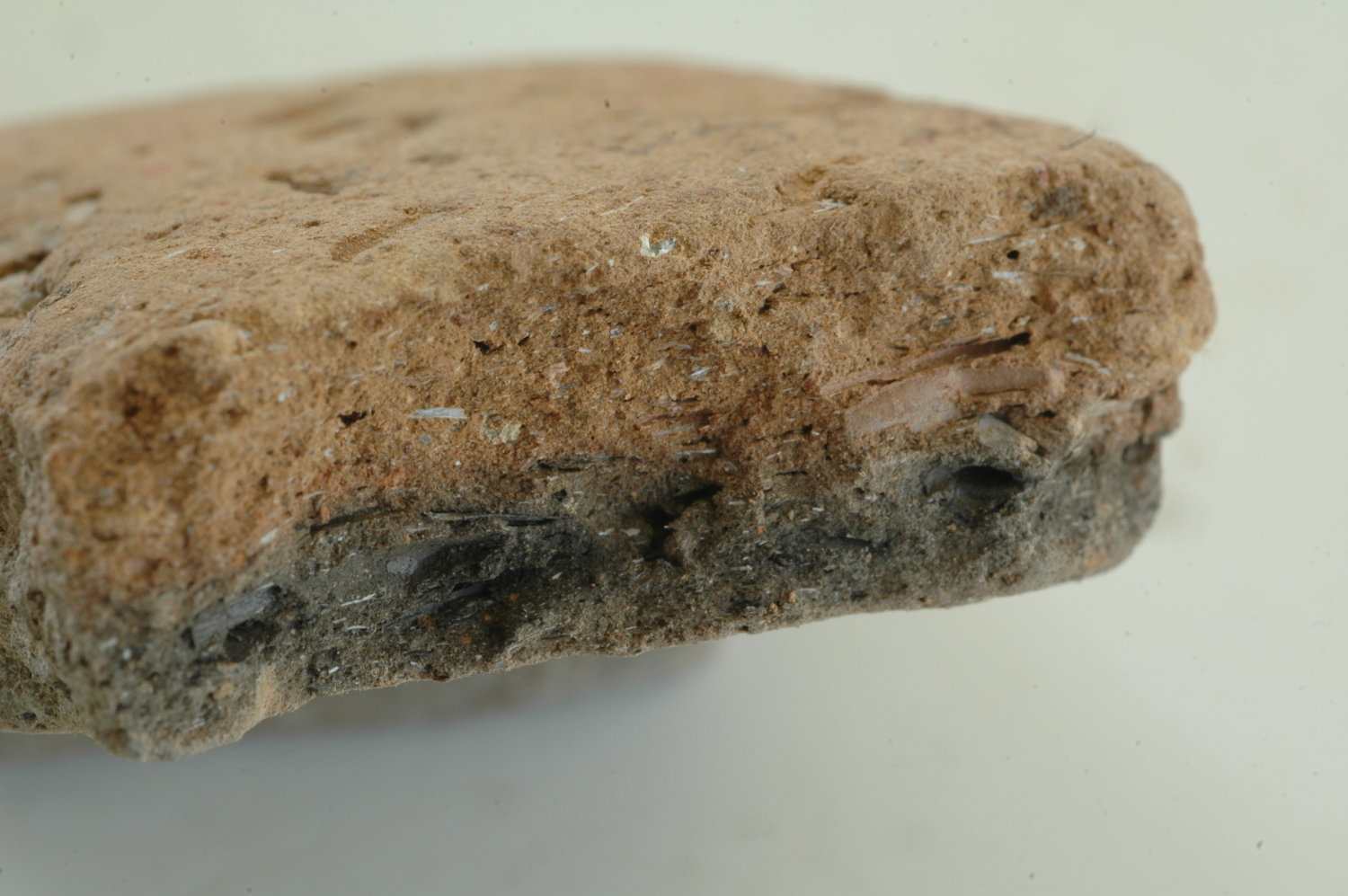
Nile clay C1

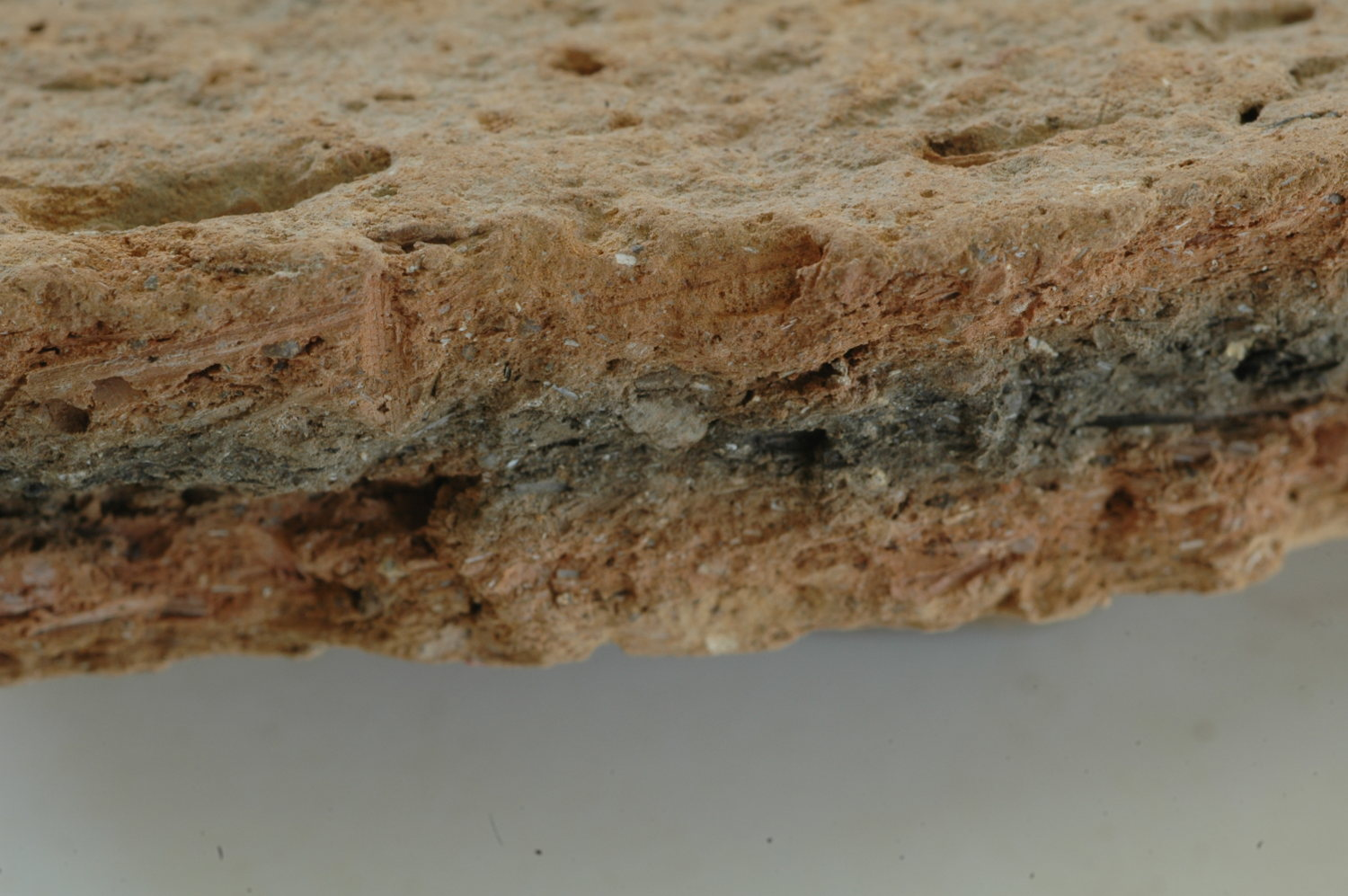
Nile clay C2

==== Nile clay D ====
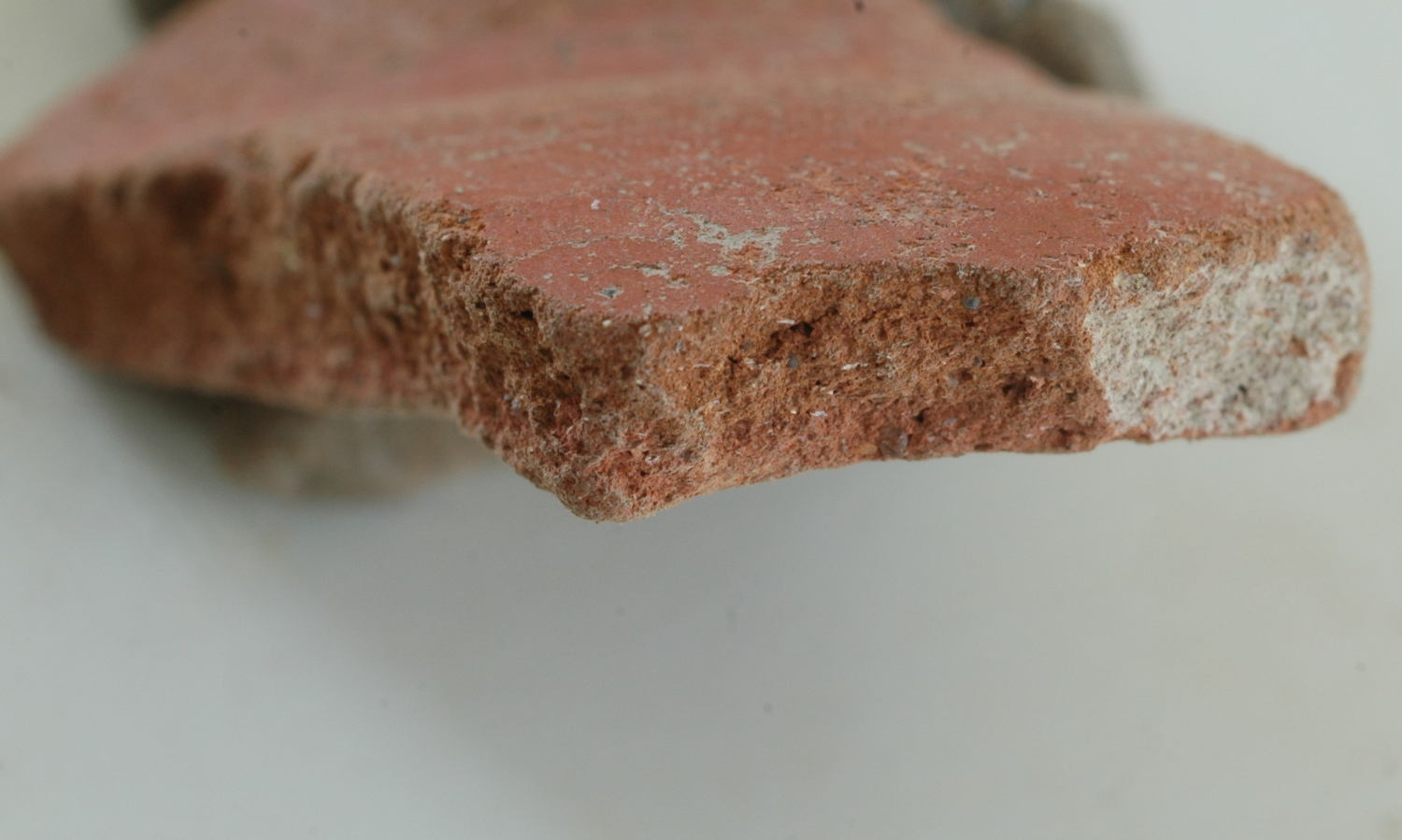
Nile clay D

The main sign of Nile clay D is the conspicuous quantity of limestone, which might be either a natural component or a tempering additive. Without this visible limestone component, this type of clay would be classified differently, as Nile clay A (at Tell el-Dab'a), lightly fired Nile clay B (at Dahshur), or as Nile clay B2 - C (at Memphis).

==== Nile clay E ====
This clay consists of a large amount of rounded sand particles, ranging from fine to large grains, which are clearly visible on the surface and in fractures. Aside from these diagnostic components, the fabric can look characteristic of Nile clay B or Nile clay C. Nile clay E has so far only been identified in a few locations: in the eastern Delta (Tell el-Dab’a and Qantir) and the region of Memphis and the southern Fayyum.

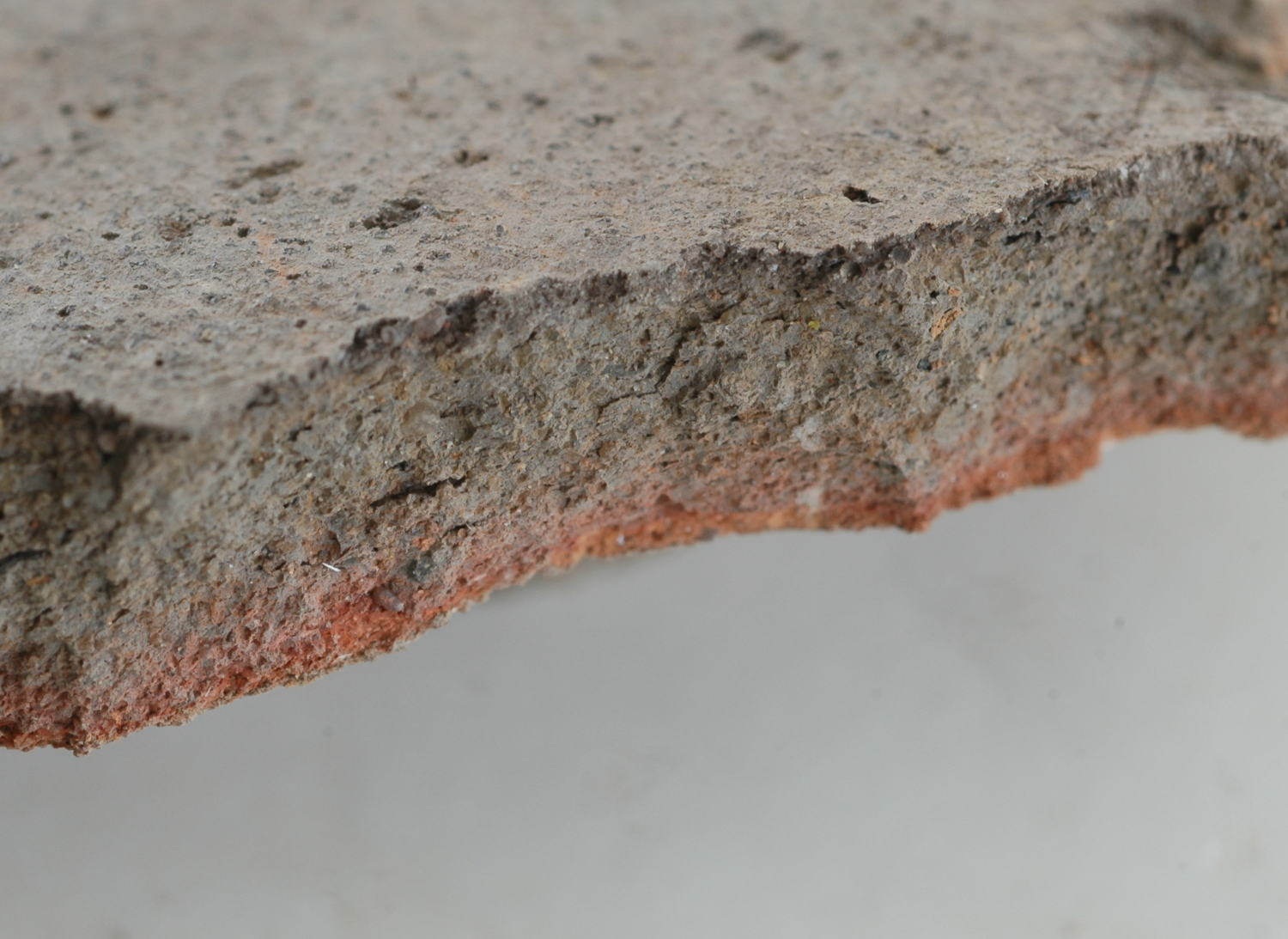
Nile clay E1

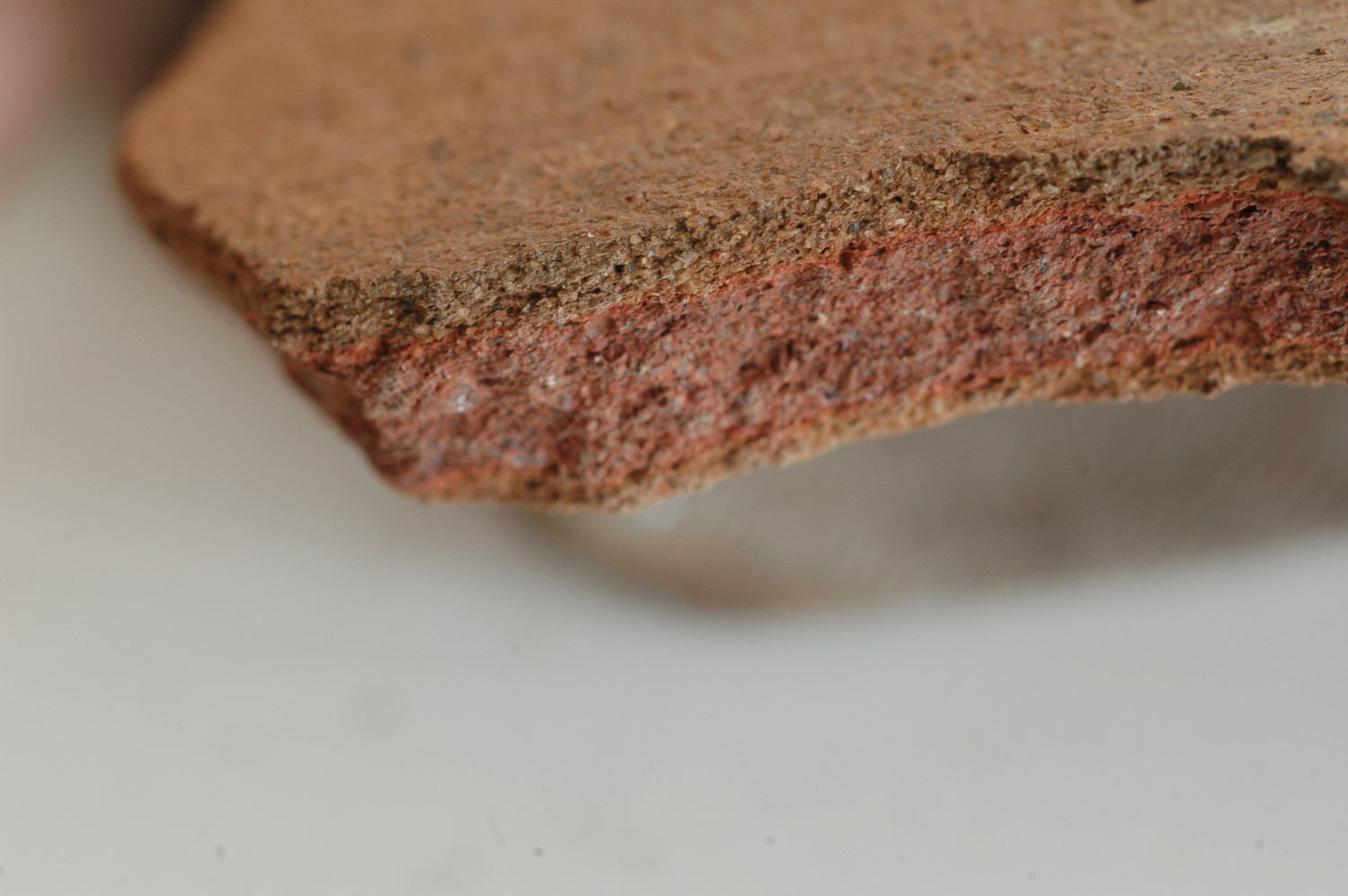
Nile clay E2

==== Marl clay A ====
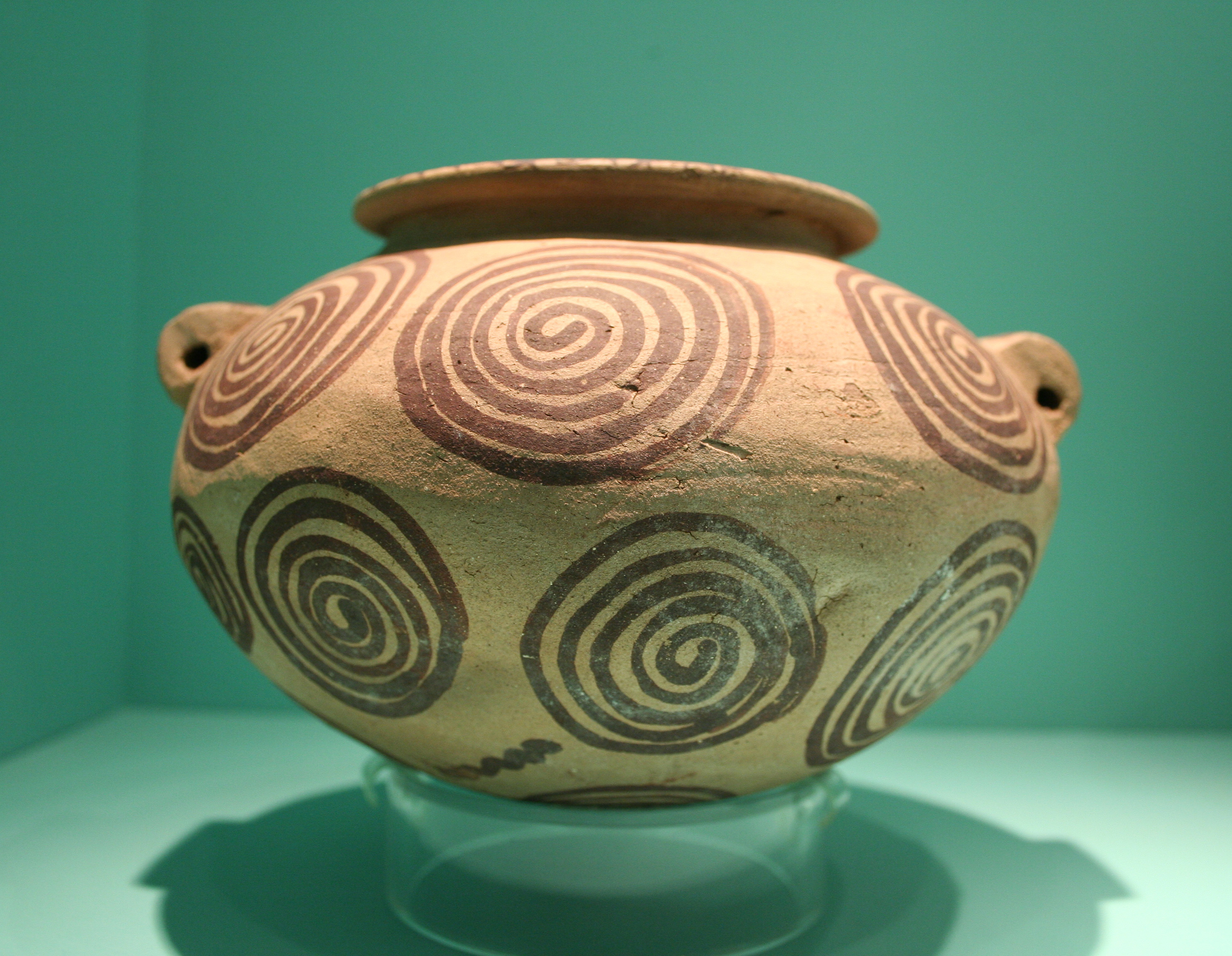
Marl clay A1

This group is divided into four variants. The shared characteristics of Marl clay A are its compact and homogeneous fabric, the fine mineral components and very low proportion of organic substances.

- Marl clay A1: The fabric consists of a relatively fine and homogeneous clay, tempered with visible particles of fine-to-medium grained limestone. This is the most visible aspect in fractures and outer surfaces. The particles are sharp and vary in size from 60 to 400 μm, with occasional larger particles. Fine sand and dark mica particles are common. Organic additives (straw) occur occasionally. This clay was common from Naqada II to the Old Kingdom and is one of the fabrics of Meidum ware.
- Marl clay A2: In this variant, the mineral additives are very fine and homogeneously distributed through the paste. Fine sand and limestone particles are present but do not dominate. Dark mica particles are present in small quantities. Marl clay A2 occurred from the Middle Kingdom, but is most common between the late Second Intermediate period and the 18th dynasty, mainly in Upper Egypt.
- Marl clay A3: This clay looks the most similar to modern Qena clay, although we cannot be sure that it came from this same region. A few mineral additives are visible under magnification in fractures and there is little sign that these were added as temper. The past is extraordinarily fine and homogeneous, which could indicate careful preparation of the clay, probably with a mortar. Occasionally, straw particles occur. This fabric occurs from the early Middle Kingdom into the New Kingdom, and seems to stem from Upper Egypt. On the other hand, it only rarely occurs in the eastern Delta (Tell el-Dab'a and Qantir) and the Memphis-Fayyum region.
- Marl clay A4: Of all the variants of Marl clay A, this has the greatest mix and quantity of fine and large sand particles. Mica particles and (often) straw particles can also occur. This clay already occurred in the Middle Kingdom, but is most common in the New Kingdom (Amarna, Malqata, Memphis, Saqqara, etc.).

==== Marl clay B ====
The fabric is homogeneous and very thick. The diagnostic feature of the fabric is its high sand content, which makes up roughly 40% of the paste and was added as temper. The particles range from angular to vaguely rounded and from fine to large. As in Marl clay A4, limestone additives are visible under magnification, appearing as a calcareous material in the clay's fabric at 45x magnification. Marl clay B was mainly used for large and mid-sized vessels and seems to be very restricted in space and time, to the Second Intermediate period and New Kingdom in Upper Egypt.

==== Marl clay C ====
This group is divided into three types. The shared feature of all three is the presence of numerous limestone particles, more or less ground down, which range from medium to large in size, and give the material a sparkly appearance. The fabric itself is fine and thick. Fine and medium sand particles, added as temper, are also encountered, as well as light and dark mica.

- Marl clay C1: This variant is defined by the presence of fine to medium ground particles of limestone. Fractures are almost always composed of different zones, each of which are red with a gray or black core and show many signs of prefatory glazing.
- Marl clay C2: Most of the limestone particles remain intact and fractures do not have zones, but a uniform colour which ranges from red (Munsell 10R 4/6) to brown (Munsell 5YR 6/6). Another distinction from C1 is the sand temper: in C2 the proportion of sand is larger than that of limestone.
- Marl clay C compact: This clay has much less sand than C1 and C2 and is much thicker. This variant has thus far only been found in a single type of ware - large, egg-shaped flasks with grooved necks.

==== Marl clay D ====
The fabric is fine and homogeneous. The characteristic feature is the limestone particles, which were probably added as temper. They are smaller than those in Marl clay C and vary from fine to large in size, forming around 25% of the material (which is less than the limestone temper of Marl clay C). Fine and large-grained sand, black mica, and dark stone are also added as temper. Organic additives are very rare. The surface is notably sandy to the touch. This type of clay was very widespread in the Delta and the Memphis-Fayyum region in the 18th and 19th Dynasties and seems to appear in the south only as imports from the north.

==== Marl clay E ====
The combination is similar to that in Marl clay B, with the exception of the visible mid-to-large particles of straw, which were added as temper. Sand was also added (medium to large particles, 20-40% of the mass of the clay), as well as particles of mica. This type of clay is relatively rare, but is known in Memphis and Upper Egypt (Koptos and Deir el-Ballas), during the short period between the Second Intermediate Period and the early 18th dynasty. It was used mainly for thick-walled vessels, often hand-molded bread tablets. This suggests that the intentional addition of straw might have been connected with this special function.

=== Köhler code ===
For the predynastic pottery from Buto and Helwan, which only has limited overlap with the Vienna system, E. Christiana Köhler developed a typological code. These five-digit codes are based on various criteria, whereby each digit in the code refers to a particular aspect:

- Appearance (large/heavy, medium, and fine with the numbers 1–3),
- Clay type (Nile clay = 1, Marl clay = 2, other clay = 3)
- Surface treatment (very rough = 1, roughly smoothed = 2, well-smoothed = 3, polished = 4)
- Coating (no coating = 0, black = 1, white coating = 2, red = 3, other colour = 4)
- Presence of additives and tempering (normal = 1, mainly straw = 2, mainly sand = 3, significant limestone = 4, very little or none = 5, fibre = 6).

=== Petrographic analyses ===
Petrographic analysis has also proven useful as a complementary system of classification and analysis to that based on characteristics that are observable to the naked eye or a microscope. This technique examines thin slices of the ceramic material or of extracted mineral additives, in order to get further information on them. It can identify various mineral and organic additives. The structure and porosity of the ceramic material can be precisely measured. The original firing temperature can be determined. The origin of the clay can be identified. It also makes it possible to work out whether other particles in the clay arrived their naturally or were added as temper.

=== Chemical and mineralogical analysis ===
Additionally, chemical and mineralogical methods developed by archaeological science can be deployed to determine the composition of the clay. Such methods include:

- Neutron activation analysis (NAA)
- Instrumental Neutron activation analysis (INAA)
- X-ray fluorescence spectroscopy (XRF spectroscopy)
- Atomic emission spectroscopy (AES), sometimes also called Optical emission spectrometry (OES)
- Atomic absorption spectroscopy (AAS)
- Inductively coupled plasma mass spectrometry (ICP-MS)
- X-Ray diffraction (XRD)

== Pottery dating ==
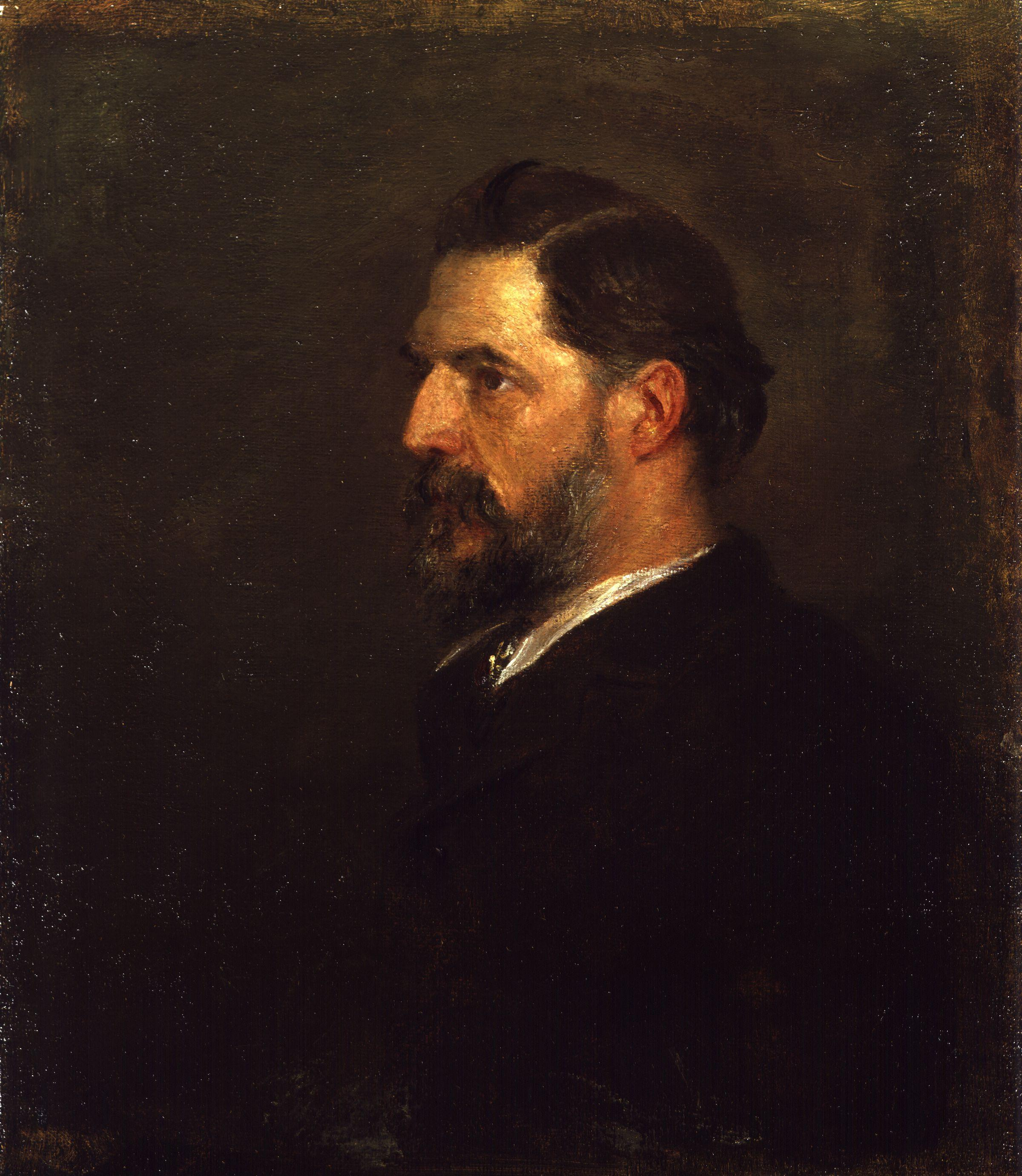
William Matthew Flinders Petrie, who developed the method of pottery seriation.

Pottery seriation has proven useful for constructing an archaeological relative chronology for Egypt. This method was invented in 1899 by Flinders Petrie. In the late twentieth century, there was an enormous increase in the studies of Egyptian pottery, with respect to the quantity of sherds which have been analysed (from a large number of different excavation sites) and the range of investigative techniques used to get information out of pottery remains. As a result, the changes in the pottery types have become ever more accurately understood over time. For example, the shape of bread-molds changed drastically at the end of the Old Kingdom, but it is not clear whether this process resulted from social, economic or technological causes, or just fashion. Thus, there are many causes of the changes observed in material culture and only a few can be linked to political changes which dominate traditional perspectives on Egyptian history.

On the other hand, for example, links can be made between political and cultural changes and the changes in pottery from centralised production in the Old Kingdom to the revival of local pottery types during the politically decentralised First Intermediate period to the new unity in the reunified 12th Dynasty. Through the study of pottery, along with other artifacts, it is possible to create a holistic narrative of Egyptian history, in which political developments are understood within the context of a long process of cultural change.

=== Petrie's Sequence Dating ===
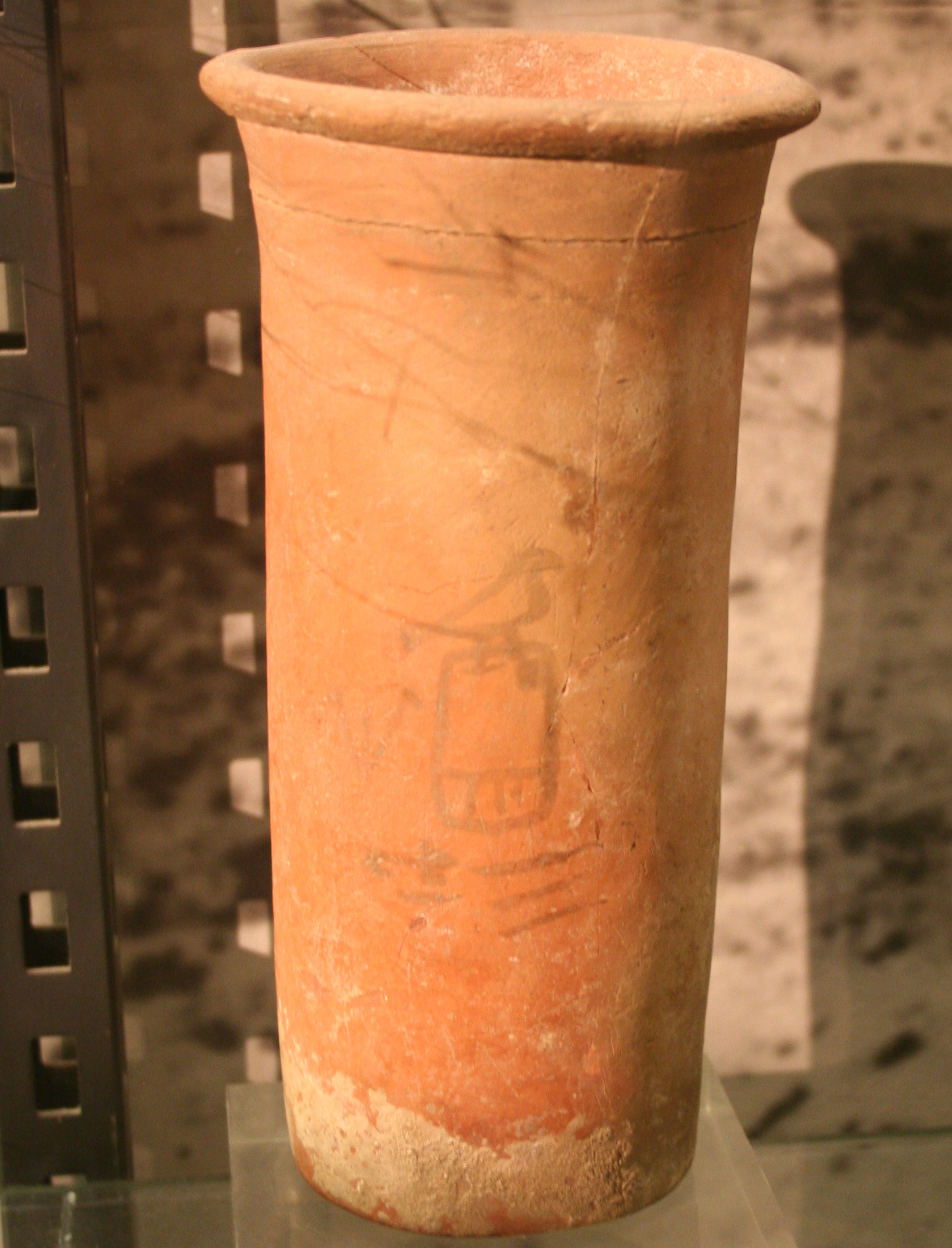
Cylinder vessel with decorative band, end of the way-handled typology, Naqada IIIC1 period; 1st Dynasty; King Aha

W. M. Flinders Petrie was the first to attempt a pottery seriation (which he called a 'Sequence dating'), focused on the pottery of the Naqada culture. He published his first study of the relative chronology of the Naqada culture in 1899. His first 'predynastic' corpus was based on the excavations of necropoleis at Naqada, Deir el-Ballas, and Hu. Originally, he identified nine classes and over 700 pottery types. For this typology, he selected 900 intact graves containing five or more types, out of the over 4,000 graves that he had excavated. He produced an index card for each of them and attempted to place these index cards in order. He made two important observations:

- White cross-lined pottery (Note: White cross-lined pottery mostly consists of Nile clay tempered with sand. The colour of the exterior surface ranges from dark red to reddish brown and is polished. Characteristically, it is painted with white or cream coloured images (geometric patterns, animals, plants, people, and ships).) practically never occurred with Decorated (Note: Decorated pottery is mostly made of marl clay tempered with sand. The surface is well-smoothed, but not polished. The colour ranges from light red to yellow-gray. The surface was painted with red-brown images. The most common motifs are ships, desert creatures, flamingos, people, spirals, wavy lines and Z-lines.) and Wavy-handled pottery. (Note: The Wavy-Handled pottery derives from the Naqada IIc period in appearance. In production and working, they are identical with the Decorated ware. The outer surface ranges from light red to yellow-gray. The characteristic feature is the wavy-handles.)
- The form of the wavy-handled types developed from a bullet-shape to a more cylindrical one, and from functional handles to decorative lines.

After Petrie had arranged all his index cards, he divided them into 50 groups, each consisting of 18 tombs. He defined SD 30 as the starting point, in order to give space for possible earlier cultures which had not then been discovered. He divided the 50 Sequence dates into three groups, which he classified as 'archaeological', 'cultural', and 'chronological', and named them after important find spots: Amratian (SD 30–37), Gerzean (SD 38–60) and Semainean (SD 60–75).

Pietre produced a second corpus of 'protodynastic' pottery, based principally on the finds in the necropolis in Tarchan. In this case, he identified 885 types, but no classes, which made it difficult for him to use this seriation. This second corpus partially overlapped with the earlier, 'predynastic corpus'. He started with SD 76 and continued to SD 86, with SD 83-86 remaining very theoretical, due to the shortage of material from the 2nd dynasty. This time, Petrie based the transition to a new 'sequence date' mainly on typological breaks, which Petrie defined on the basis of the development of the Wavy-handled types. He also linked the sequence dates with the historically dated pottery and objects from the royal graves of the early dynasties at Abydos.

There are some methodological issues with Petrie's classification:

- There is no distinction between typology and chronology.
- The 'classes' were very heterogeneously defined.
- The definitions are not based on strict rules.
- Since only tombs with five or more objects were used, the early periods are under-represented.
- Regional differences were not considered.
- The horizontal distribution of pottery within a cemetery was not treated as an important criterion.
- A systematic problem was that whenever new tombs were discovered, new types would need to be defined.
Typology of the wavy-handled pottery, according to Petrie

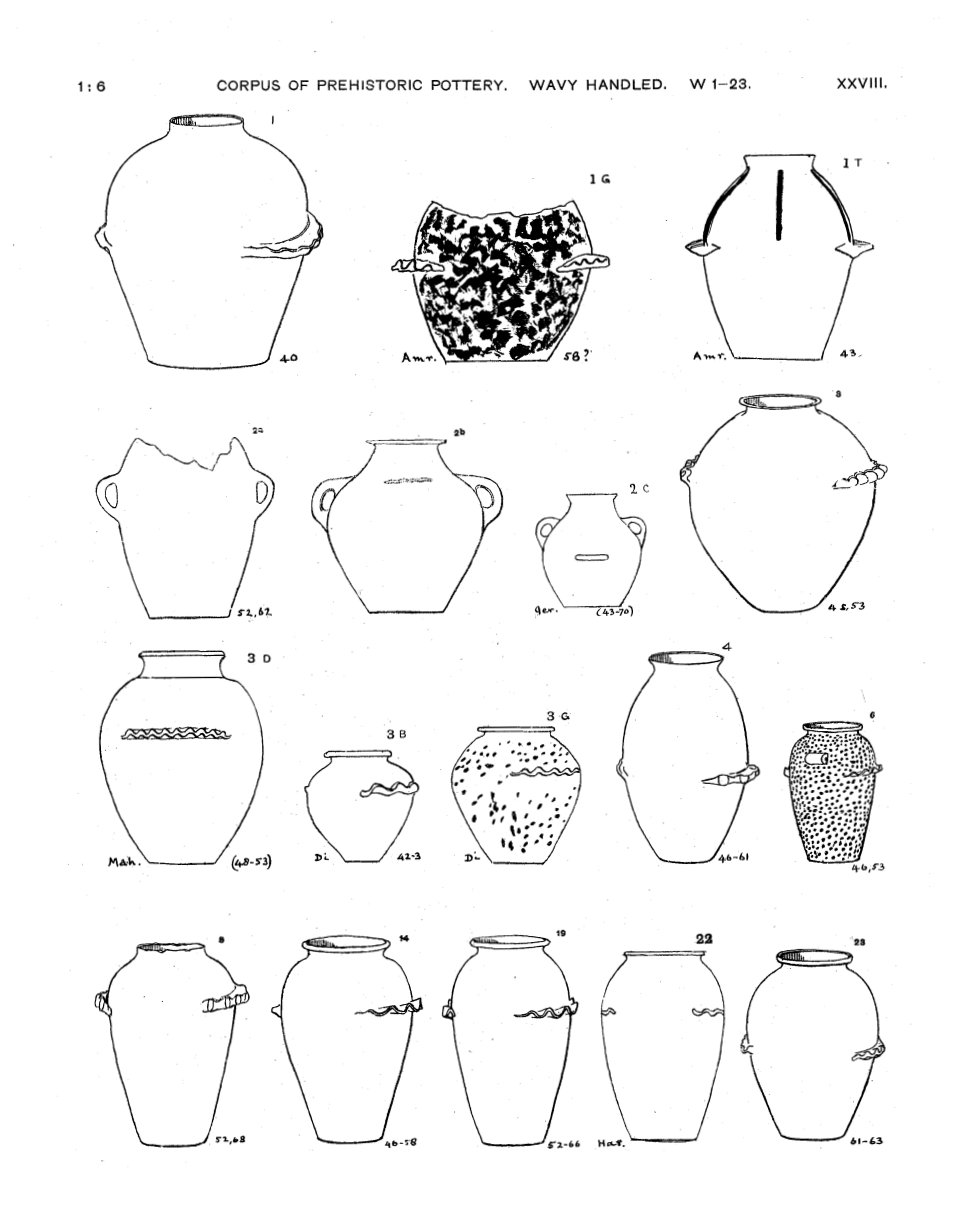
The evolution of the ceramics, from round vessels with two, functional handles...

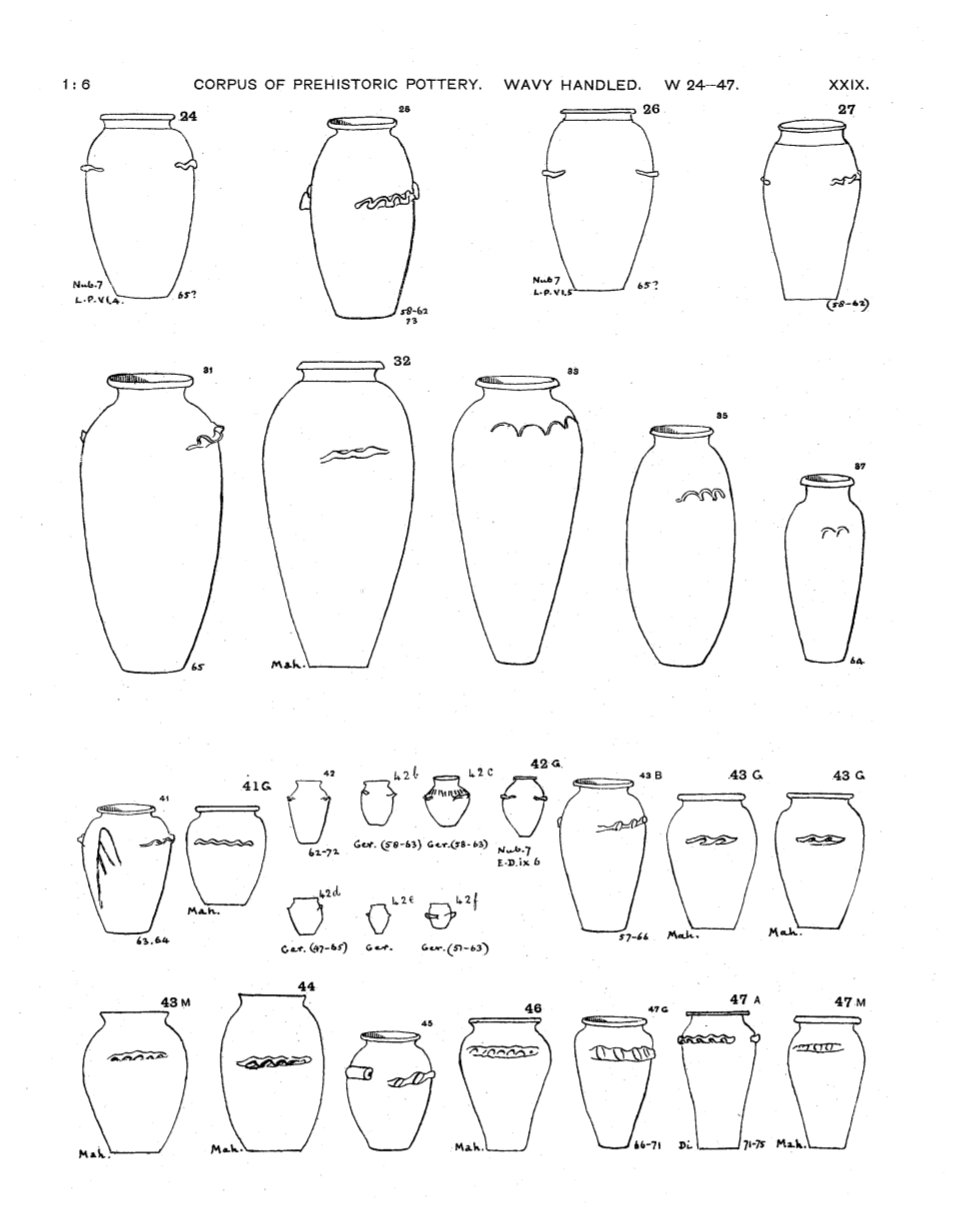

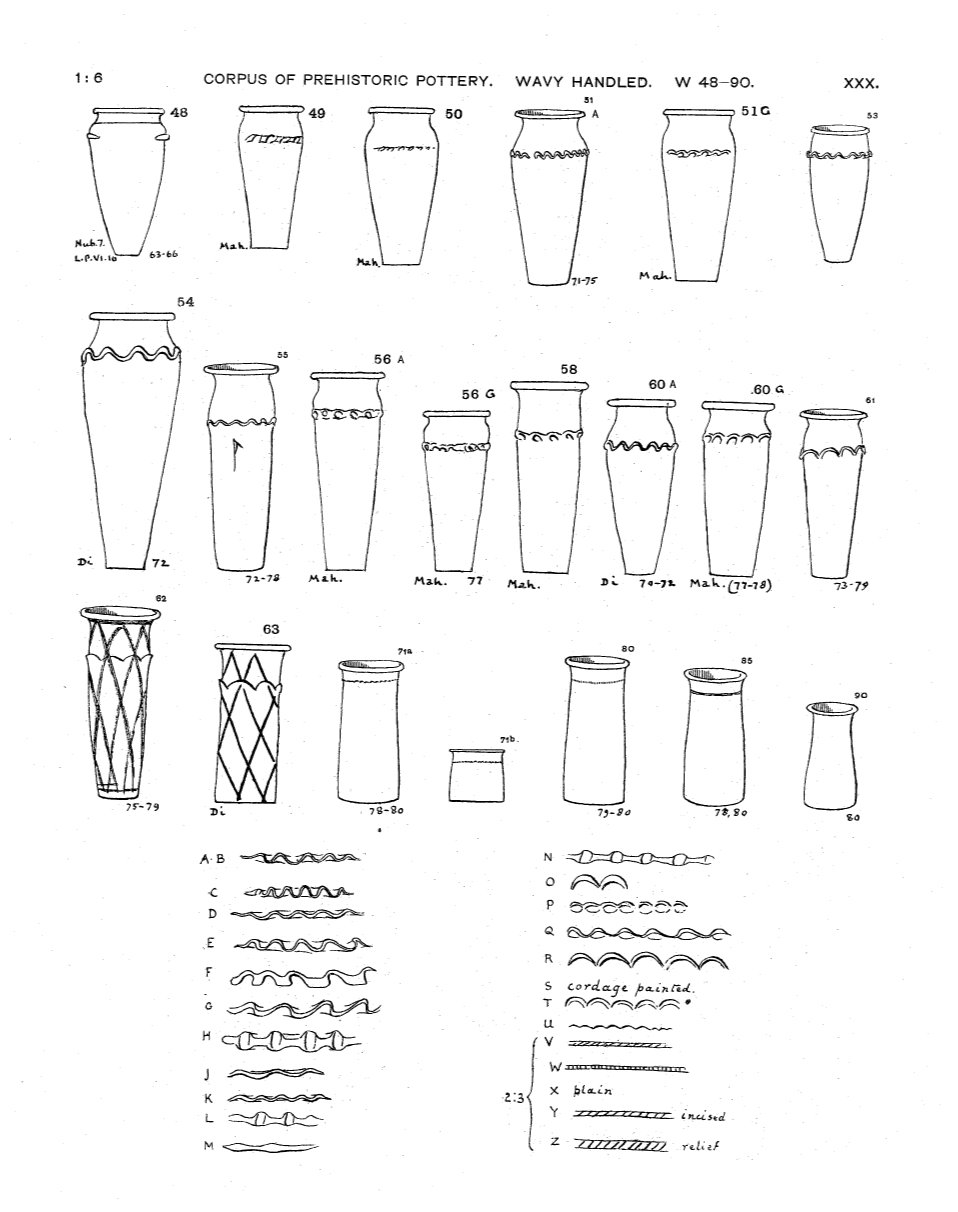
... into cylindrical vessels with decorative bands.

=== Kaiser's Stage-chronology ===
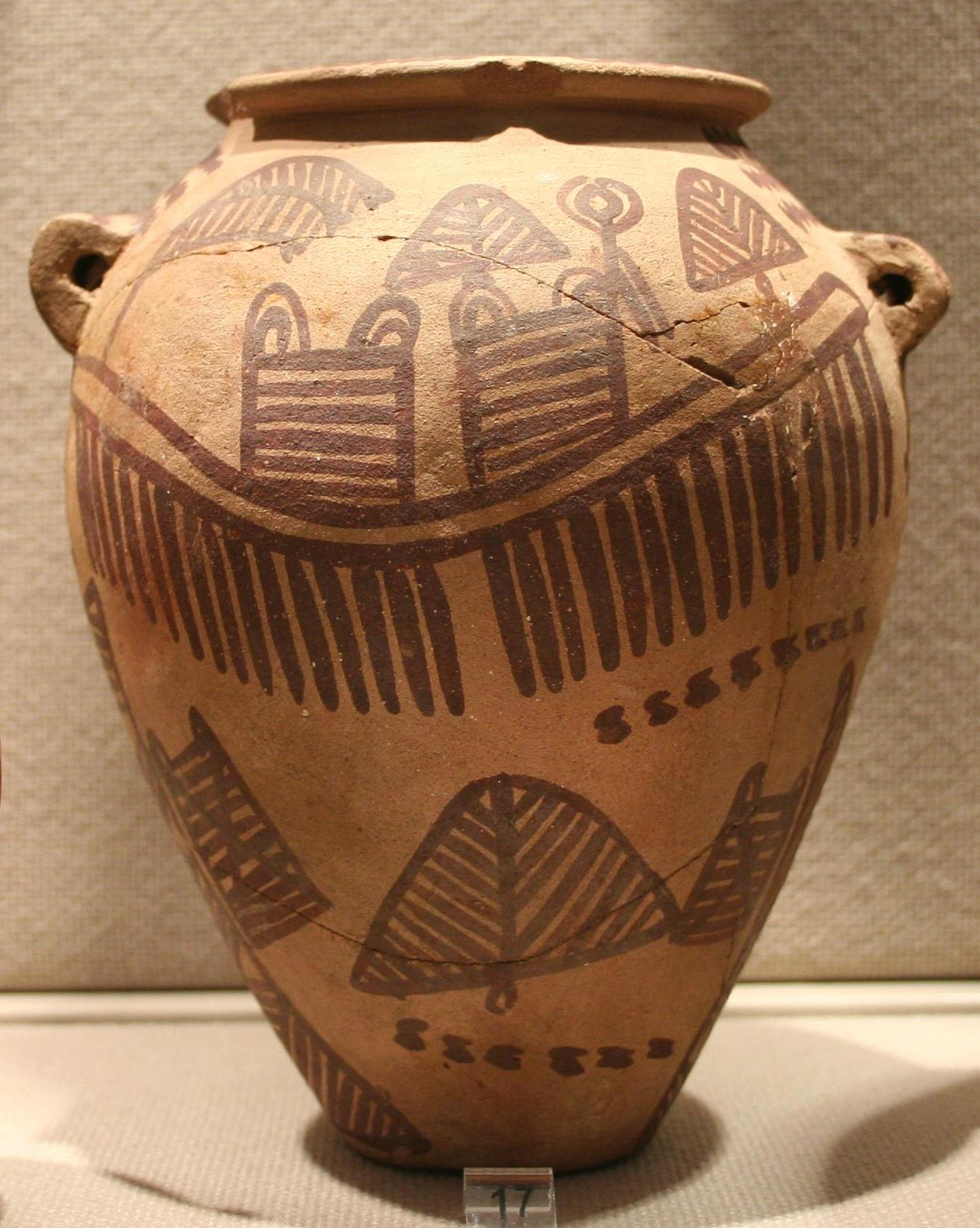
Typical decorated pottery of period II.

The next person to undertake a relative chronology of the predynastic period was Werner Kaiser. He largely accepted Petrie's typology and used the necropolis 1400–1500 at Armant as his starting point. At the same time, Kaiser also paid attention to the horizontal divisions of the pottery record and if a period was not attested at Armant, he also used pottery from other cemeteries. He identified three broad zones in the cemetery, each of which was dominated by a specific group of pottery: Black-topped, Rough wares, and Late or Wavy-Handled wares. Within each of these periods, he identified subdivisions, which he called "stages" (Stufen). These largely agreed with Petrie's divisions, but not entirely.

The following were the main stages, according to Kaiser:

- Stage I: All findspots in Upper Egypt include this stage, from the Badari regions to south of Aswan. Cemeteries were dominated by the Black-topped pottery (Note: Black-topped pottery was made of Nile clay tempered with sand and is typical of Naqada I and IIa-b. Its key characteristics are a black rim and a dark red or reddish brown outer surface, which is nearly always polished.) which made up more than 50% of the total assemblage. The second most common types are Red-polished (Note: Red-Polished pottery is identical to the Black-topped pottery except that it lacks the black rim.) and White Cross-Lined pottery.
- Stage II: According to Werner Kaiser's definition, this stage was dominated by the Rough pottery. (Note: Rough pottery is made of Nile clay, heavily tempered with straw. The outer surfaces are only roughly smoothed, with a red-brown colour and no glaze.) However, in Stage IIa, the Black-topped pottery increasingly overtakes the Rough pottery. During the transition from Stage IIb to IIc, the Wavy-Handled pottery came into use. Some new Decorated types also appeared at this point.
- Stage III: In this stage, the Late pottery occurs, (Note: Late pottery is made of the same material as the Decorated and Wavy-Handled wares and includes various kinds of vessel which only came into use in the later Naqada period. Aside from this, some of it cannot be distinguished from Rough ware.) outnumbering the Rough pottery. This stage is particularly important for the relative chronology of the predynastic and early dynastic periods, since it is contains the final stage of state formation and can partially be connected with the historical chronology of the First and Second dynasties.

There were still some problems with this chronology:

- It was almost entirely based on a single cemetery, which made it impossible to detect regional differences.
- Stages Ia, Ib and IIIb are pretty much hypothetical, especially the development of the Wavy-Handled class.
- Kaiser published only a short summary in the form of an article, which only illustrated the characteristic types for each stage.

=== Stan Hendrickx ===
Since the mid-1980s, Stan Hendrickx has extended and improved Werner Kaiser's model. He based his work on the principle of studying groups of graves as a unit (thus also respecting divisions of space within an individual cemetery), rather than just studying individual graves and their contents. As a result, he faced a conflict between developing a tight relative chronology of all individual pottery types and defining chronologically indicative assemblages. He could not accept a higher priority being given to either of these criteria.

=== Computer seriation ===
Barry Kemp undertook a multi-dimensional analysis of the tombs in Necropolis B at el-Amrah and the Necropolis at el-Mahasna. These seriations were only used to evaluate Petrie's Sequence dating, not Kaiser's Stage-chronology.

Toby Wilkinson undertook a seriation of eight predynastic and early dynastic necropoleis, based on 1420 types from Petrie's corpus (out of a total of 1542), which he arranged into 141 groups. There were large problems with the newly defined groups, since they were very heterogeneously defined. For example, the cylindrical vessels with and without incised decoration were placed in the same group, even though Kaiser had considered the presence of incision to be an important chronological indicator.

== Bibliography ==
- R. O. Allen, H. Hamroush, M. A. Hoffman: "Archaeological implications of differences in the composition of Nile sediments." in Ralph O Allen, Archaeological Chemistry IV: developed from a symposium sponsored by the Division of History of Chemistry at the 193rd meeting of the American Chemical Society, Denver, Colorado, April 5–10, 1987. American Chemical Society, Washington 1989, ISBN 978-0-8412-1449-1, pp. 33–56.
- Dorothea Arnold, "Keramik." in Wolfgang Helck, Wolfhart Westendorf: Lexikon der Ägyptologie. (LÄ) Vol. III: Horhekenu - Megeb. Harrassowitz, Wiesbaden 1980, ISBN 978-3-447-02100-5, col. 392–409.
- Dorothea Arnold, Janine Bourriau (ed.): An Introduction to Ancient Egyptian Pottery (= Deutsches Archäologisches Institut, Abteilung Kairo. [DAIKS] Sonderschrift 17). von Zabern, Mainz 1993.
- Dorothea Arnold, Studien zur Altägyptischen Keramik (= DAIKS. Sonderschriften 9). von Zabern, Mainz 1981.
- Dorothea Arnold, "Wandbild und Scherbenbefund. Zur Töpfereitechnik der alten Ägypter vom Beginn der pharaonischen Zeit bis zu den Hyksos." Mitteilungen des Deutschen Archäologischen Instituts, Abteilung Kairo. (MDAIK) Bd. 32, 1976, pp. 1–34.
- Dean E. Arnold, Ceramic Theory and Cultural Process (= New studies in archaeology.). Cambridge University Press, New York 1985, ISBN 978-0-521-25262-1.
- Janine D. Bourriau, Paul T. Nicholson, Pamela J. Rose, "Pottery." in Paul T. Nicholson, Ian Shaw (ed.): Ancient Egyptian Materials and Technology. Cambridge University Press, Cambridge/ New York 2000, ISBN 978-0-521-45257-1, pp. 121–147.
- Colin A. Hope: Egyptian Pottery (= Shire Egyptology. Vol. 5). Shire, Aylesbury 1987, ISBN 978-0-85263-852-1.
- Friedman, R. F. (1994). Predynastic settlement ceramics of Upper Egypt: A comparative study of the ceramics of Hemamieh, Nagada, and Hierakonpolis (Doctoral dissertation, University of California, Berkeley).
- E. Christiana Köhler, Buto III. Die Keramik von der späten Vorgeschichte bis zum frühen Alten Reich (Schicht III bis VI) (= Archäologische Veröffentlichungen des Deutschen Archäologischen Instituts Kairo. Vol. 94). von Zabern, Mainz 1998.
- Christina Regner: Keramik (= Bonner Sammlung von Aegyptiaca. Vol. 3). Harrassowitz, Wiesbaden 1998, ISBN 978-3-447-04114-0. (Online)
- Savage, S. (2001). Towards an AMS Radiocarbon Chronology of Predynastic Egyptian Ceramics. Radiocarbon, 43(3), 1255–1277. doi:10.1017/S0033822200038534
- Robert Schiestl, Anne Seiler: Handbook of Pottery of the Egyptian Middle Kingdom. Band I: The Corpus Volume. Band II: The Regional Volume. Verlag der Österreichischen Akademie der Wissenschaften, Wien 2012.
- Anna Wodzińska: A Manual of Egyptian Pottery (= AERA field manual series.). Ancient Egypt Research Associates (AERA), Boston, 2009/ 2010:
  - Volume 1: Fayum A – Lower Egyptian Culture (= AERA field manual series. Vol. 1). 2009, ISBN 978-0-9779370-2-8.
  - Volume 2: Naqada III – Middle Kingdom (= AERA field manual series. Vol. 1). 2009, ISBN 978-0-9825544-5-6.
  - Volume 3: Second Intermediate Period – Late Period (= AERA field manual series. Vol. 1). 2010, ISBN 978-0-9825544-0-1.
  - Volume 4: Ptolemaic Period – Modern (= AERA field manual series. Vol. 1). 2010, ISBN 978-0-9825544-2-5.
