= Aswan High Dam =

- The Aswan Dam as seen from space

- Location of the Aswan Dam in Egypt
- Official name: Aswan Dam
- Location: Aswan, Egypt
- Coordinates: 23°58′14″N 32°52′40″E
- Construction began: 1960; 66 years ago
- Opening date: 1970; 56 years ago
- Owner: Egypt

Dam and spillways
- Type of dam: Embankment
- Impounds: River Nile
- Height: 111 m (364 ft)
- Length: 3,830 m (12,570 ft)
- Width (base): 980 m (3,220 ft)
- Spillway capacity: 11,000 m^{3}/s (390,000 cu ft/s)

Reservoir
- Creates: Lake Nasser
- Total capacity: 132 km^{3} (107,000,000 acre⋅ft)
- Surface area: 5,250 km^{2} (2,030 sq mi)
- Maximum length: 550 km (340 mi)
- Maximum width: 35 km (22 mi)
- Maximum water depth: 130 m (430 ft)
- Normal elevation: 183 m (600 ft)

Power Station
- Commission date: 1967–1971
- Turbines: 12×175 MW (235,000 hp) Francis-type
- Installed capacity: 2,100 MW (2,800,000 hp)
- Capacity factor: 54.6%
- Annual generation: 10,042 GWh (2004)

The Aswan High Dam, often called simply Aswan Dam, was built between 1960 and 1970 across the Nile in Aswan, Egypt. One of the world's largest embankment dams, it was developed by the Egyptian government with the help of the Soviet Union to control flooding, increase water storage for irrigation, and generate hydroelectricity. The dam was seen as pivotal to the country's industrialization plans. Like the Aswan Low Dam, which had been completed in 1902, the High Dam has changed the economy and culture of Egypt.

When the Aswan High Dam was completed, it was the tallest earthen dam in the world, surpassing the Chatuge Dam in the United States. It created the Lake Nasser reservoir.

It was built 7 km (4.3 mi) upstream of the Low Dam, which was built in 1902 to regulate the annual flooding of the Nile during late summer. These floods brought high water with natural nutrients and minerals that annually enriched the fertile soil along its floodplain and delta; this predictability had made the Nile valley ideal for farming since ancient times. However, this natural flooding varied, since high-water years could destroy the whole crop, while low-water years could create widespread drought and consequently famine. The Low Dam's relatively small capacity meant water continued to pass largely unimpeded down the valley from its East African drainage basin, so floods and droughts continued.

As Egypt's population grew and technology increased, the desire and the ability developed to completely control the flooding, and thus both protect and support farmland and its economically important cotton crop. With the greatly increased reservoir storage provided by the High Aswan Dam, the floods could be controlled and the water could be stored for later release over multiple years.

The Aswan Dam was designed by Nikolai Aleksandrovich Malyshev of the Moscow-based Hydroproject Institute. Designed for both irrigation and power generation, the dam incorporates a number of features that were relatively new in the 1960s, including a very deep grout curtain below its base. Although the reservoir will eventually silt in, even the most conservative estimates indicate the dam will give at least 200 years of service.

== Construction history ==
The earliest recorded attempt to build a dam near Aswan was in the 11th century, when the Arab polymath and engineer Ibn al-Haytham (known as Alhazen in the West) was summoned to Egypt by the Fatimid Caliph Al-Hakim bi-Amr Allah to regulate the flooding of the Nile, a task requiring an early attempt at an Aswan Dam. After his field work convinced him of the impracticality of this scheme, and fearing the Caliph's anger, he feigned madness. He was kept under house arrest from 1011 until al-Hakim's death in 1021, during which time he wrote his influential Book of Optics.

=== Aswan Low Dam, 1898–1902 ===
The British began construction of the first dam across the Nile in 1898. Construction lasted until 1902 and the dam was opened on 10 December 1902. The project was designed by Sir William Willcocks and involved several eminent engineers, including Sir Benjamin Baker and Sir John Aird, whose firm, John Aird & Co., was the main contractor.

=== Aswan High Dam prelude, 1954–1960 ===
In 1952, the Greek-Egyptian engineer Adrian Daninos began to develop the plan of the new Aswan Dam. Although the Low Dam was almost overtopped in 1946, the government of King Farouk showed no interest in Daninos's plans. Instead the Nile Valley Plan by the British hydrologist Harold Edwin Hurst was favored, which proposed to store water in Sudan and Ethiopia, where evaporation is much lower. The Egyptian position changed completely after the overthrow of the monarchy, led by the Free Officers Movement including Gamal Abdel Nasser. The Free Officers were convinced that the Nile Waters had to be stored in Egypt for political reasons, and within two months, the plan of Daninos was accepted. Initially, both the United States and the USSR were interested in helping development of the dam. Complications ensued due to their rivalry during the Cold War, as well as growing intra-Arab tensions.

In 1955, Nasser was claiming to be the leader of Arab nationalism, in opposition to the traditional monarchies, especially the Hashemite Kingdom of Iraq following its signing of the 1955 Baghdad Pact. At that time the U.S. feared that communism would spread to the Middle East, and it saw Nasser as a natural leader of an anticommunist procapitalist Arab League. The United States and the United Kingdom offered to help finance construction of the High Dam, with a loan of $270 million, in return for Nasser's leadership in resolving the Arab-Israeli conflict. While opposed to communism, capitalism, and imperialism, Nasser identified as a tactical neutralist, and sought to work with both the U.S. and the USSR for Egyptian and Arab benefit. After the UN criticized a raid by Israel against Egyptian forces in Gaza in 1955, Nasser realized that he could not portray himself as the leader of pan-Arab nationalism if he could not defend his country militarily against Israel. In addition to his development plans, he looked to quickly modernize his military, and he turned first to the U.S. for aid.

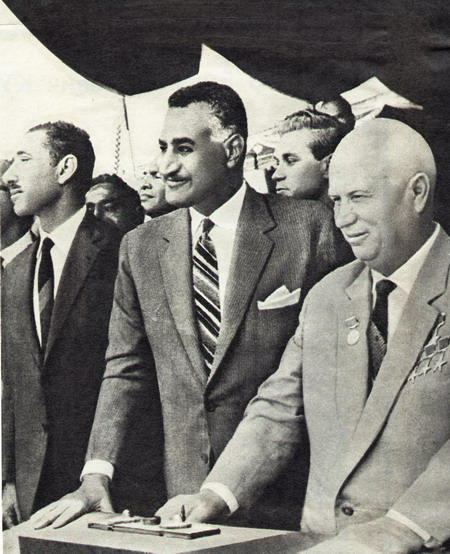
Egyptian President Nasser and Soviet leader Nikita Khrushchev at the ceremony to divert the Nile during the construction of the Aswan High Dam on 14 May 1964. At this occasion Khrushchev called it "the eighth wonder of the world"

American Secretary of State John Foster Dulles and President Dwight Eisenhower told Nasser that the U.S. would supply him with weapons only if they were used for defensive purposes and if he accepted American military personnel for supervision and training. Nasser did not accept these conditions, and consulted the USSR for support.

Although Dulles believed that Nasser was only bluffing and that the USSR would not aid Nasser, he was wrong: the USSR promised Nasser a quantity of arms in exchange for a deferred payment of Egyptian grain and cotton. On 27 September 1955, Nasser announced an arms deal, with Czechoslovakia acting as a middleman for the Soviet support. Instead of attacking Nasser for turning to the Soviets, Dulles sought to improve relations with him. In December 1955, the US and the UK pledged $56 and $14 million, respectively, toward construction of the High Aswan Dam.

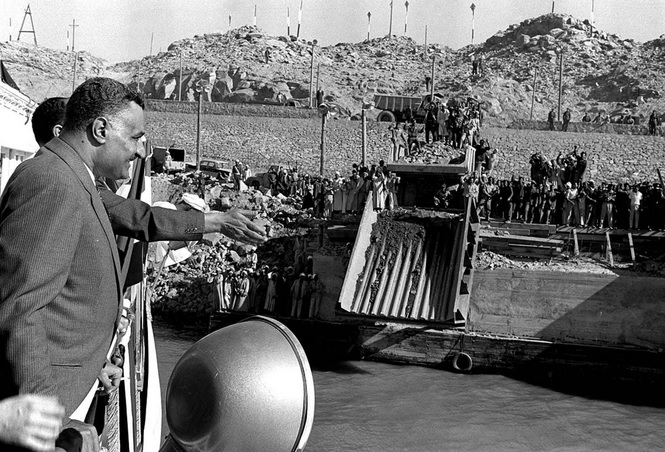
Gamal Abdel Nasser observing the construction of the dam, 1963

Though the Czech arms deal created an incentive for the US to invest at Aswan, the UK cited the deal as a reason for repealing its promise of dam funds. Dulles was angered more by Nasser's diplomatic recognition of China, which was in direct conflict with Dulles's policy of containment of communism.

Several other factors contributed to the US deciding to withdraw its offer of funding for the dam. Dulles believed that the USSR would not fulfill its commitment of military aid. He was also irritated by Nasser's neutrality and attempts to play both sides of the Cold War. At the time, other Western allies in the Middle East, including Turkey and Iraq, were resentful that Egypt, a persistently neutral country, was being offered so much aid.

In June 1956, the Soviets offered Nasser $1.12 billion at 2% interest for the construction of the dam. On 19 July the U.S. State Department announced that American financial assistance for the High Dam was "not feasible in present circumstances."

On 26 July 1956, with wide Egyptian acclaim, Nasser announced the nationalization of the Suez Canal that included fair compensation for the former owners. Nasser planned on the revenues generated by the canal to help fund construction of the High Dam. When the Suez War broke out, the United Kingdom, France, and Israel seized the canal and the Sinai. But pressure from the U.S. and the USSR at the United Nations and elsewhere forced them to withdraw.

In 1958, the USSR proceeded to provide support for the High Dam project.

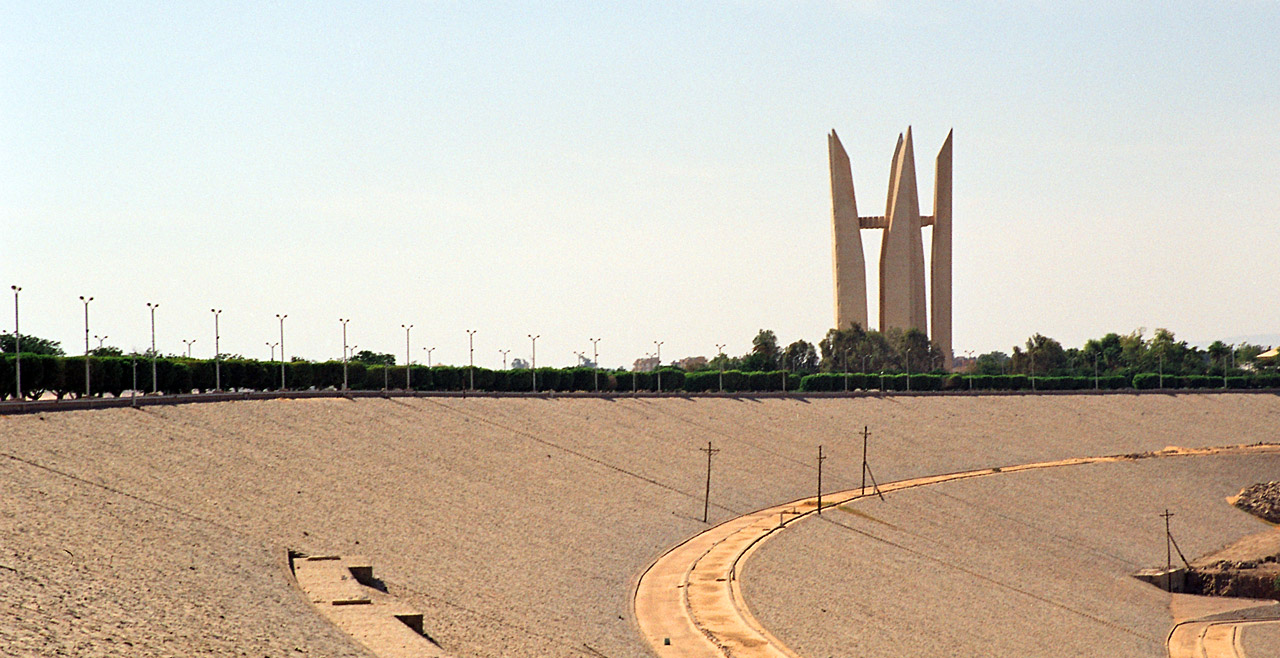
A view from the vantage point in the middle of High Dam towards the monument of Arab-Soviet Friendship (Lotus Flower) by architects Piotr Pavlov, Juri Omeltchenko and sculptor Nikolay Vechkanov

In the 1950s, archaeologists began raising concerns that several major historical sites, including the famous temple of Abu Simbel were about to be submerged by waters collected behind the dam. A rescue operation began in 1960 under UNESCO (for details see below under Effects).

Despite its size, the Aswan project has not materially hurt the Egyptian balance of payments. The three Soviet credits covered virtually all of the project's foreign exchange requirements, including the cost of technical services, imported power generating and transmission equipment and some imported equipment for land reclamation. Egypt was not seriously burdened by payments on the credits, most of which were extended for 12 years with interest at the very low rate of 2-1/2%. Repayments to the USSR constituted only a small net drain during the first half of the 1960s, and increased export earnings derived from crops grown on newly reclaimed land have largely offset the modest debt service payments in recent years. During 1965–1970, these export earnings amounted to an estimated $126 million, compared with debt service payments of $113 million.

=== Construction and filling, 1960–1976 ===
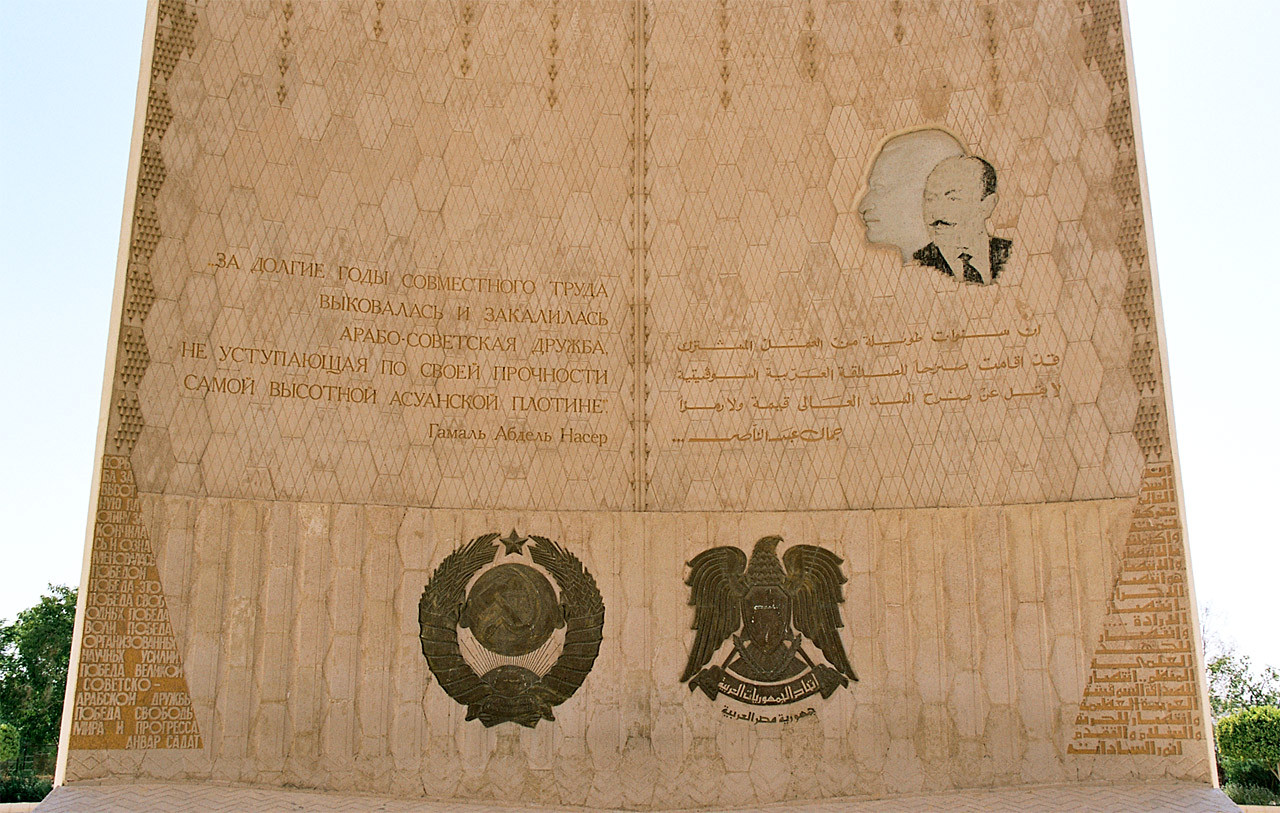
A central pylon of the monument to Arab-Soviet Friendship. The memorial commemorates the completion of the Aswan High Dam. The coat of arms of the Soviet Union is on the left and the coat of arms of Egypt is on the right.

The Soviets also provided technicians and heavy machinery. The enormous rock and clay dam was designed by Nikolai Aleksandrovich Malyshev of the Moscow-based Hydroproject Institute, along with some Egyptian engineers. 25,000 Egyptian engineers and workers contributed to the construction of the dams.

Originally designed by West German and French engineers in the early 1950s and slated for financing with Western credits, the Aswan High Dam became the USSR's largest and most famous foreign aid project after the United States, the United Kingdom, and the International Bank for Reconstruction and Development (IBRD) withdrew their support in 1956. The first Soviet loan of $100 million to cover construction of coffer dams for diversion of the Nile was extended in 1958. An additional $225 million was extended in 1960 to complete the dam and construct power-generating facilities, and subsequently about $100 million was made available for land reclamation. These credits of some $425 million covered only the foreign exchange costs of the project, including salaries of Soviet engineers who supervised the project and were responsible for the installation and testing of Soviet equipment. Actual construction, which began in 1960, was done by Egyptian companies on contract to the High Dam Authority, and all domestic costs were borne by the Egyptians. Egyptian participation in the venture has raised the construction industry's capacity and reputation significantly.

On the Egyptian side, the project was led by Osman Ahmed Osman's Arab Contractors. The relatively young Osman underbid his only competitor by one-half.

- 1960: Start of construction on 9 January
- 1964: First dam construction stage completed, reservoir started filling
- 1970: The High Dam, as-Sad al-'Aali, completed on 21 July
- 1976: Reservoir reached capacity.

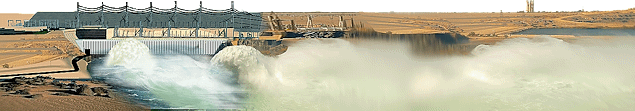

== Specifications ==
The Aswan High Dam is 3,830 metres (12,570 ft) long, 980 m (3,220 ft) wide at the base, 40 m (130 ft) wide at the crest and 111 m (364 ft) tall. It contains 43,000,000 cubic metres (56,000,000 cu yd) of material. At maximum, 11,000 cubic metres per second (390,000 cu ft/s) of water can pass through the dam. There are further emergency spillways for an extra 5,000 cubic metres per second (180,000 cu ft/s), and the Toshka Canal links the reservoir to the Toshka Depression. The reservoir, named Lake Nasser, is 500 km (310 mi) long and 35 km (22 mi) at its widest, with a surface area of 5,250 square kilometres (2,030 sq mi). It holds 132 cubic kilometres (1.73×10^{11} cu yd) of water.

A panorama of the Aswan Dam looking south

== Irrigation scheme ==
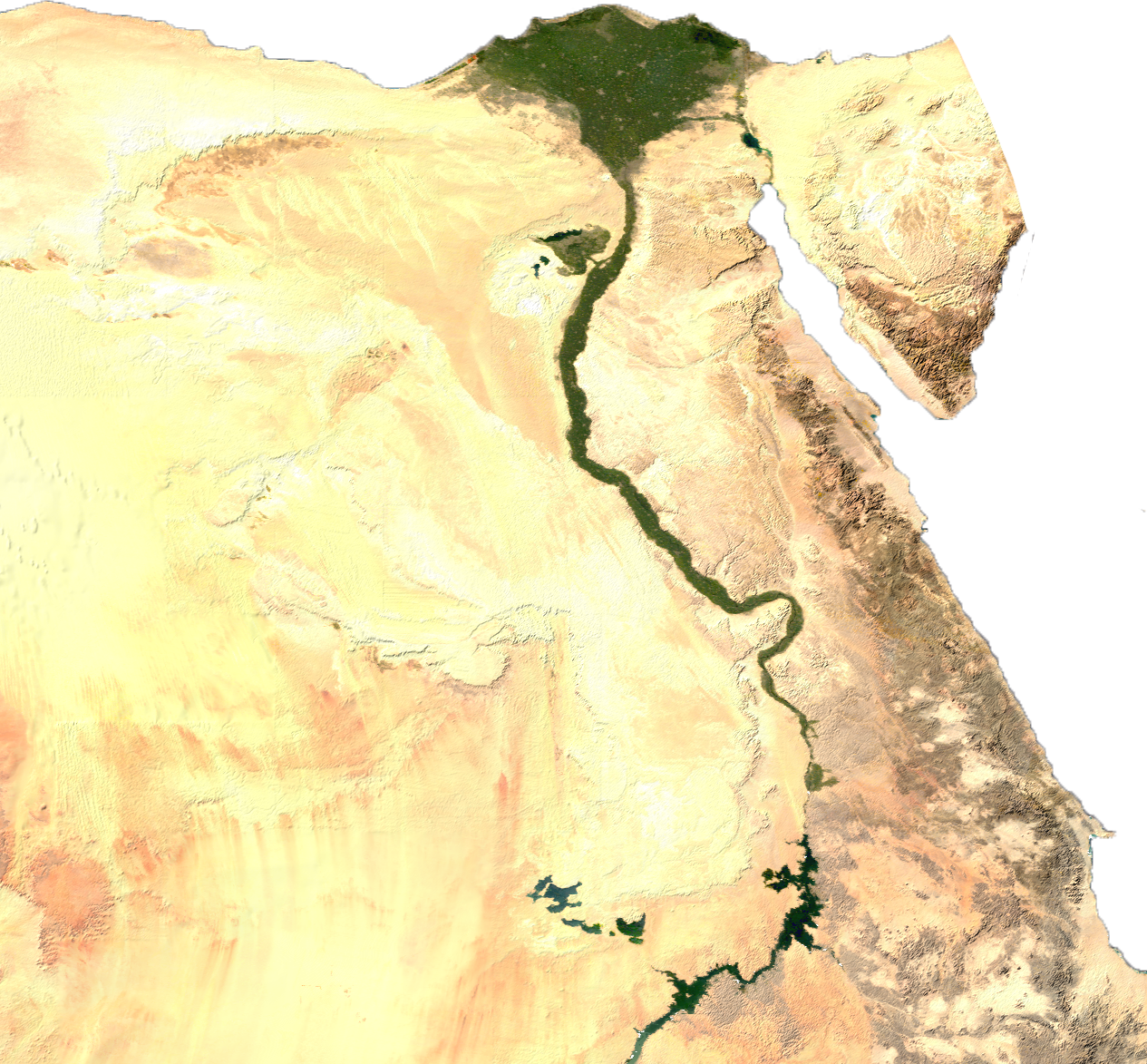
Green irrigated land along the Nile amidst the desert

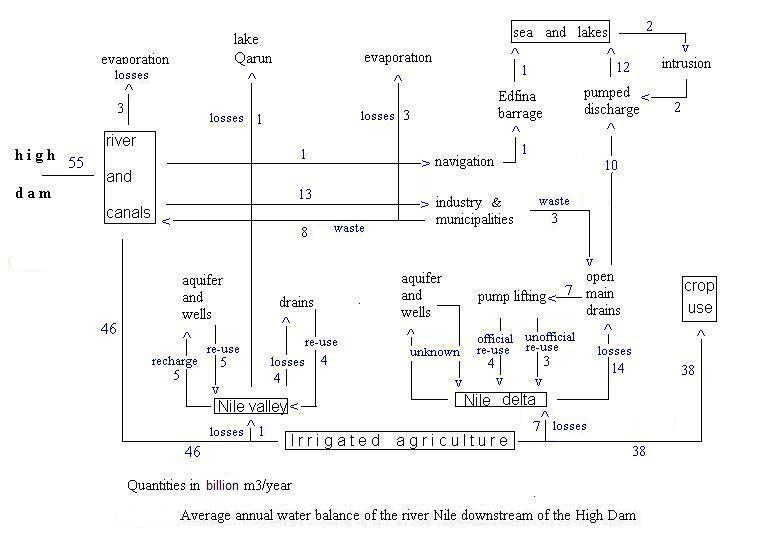
Water balances

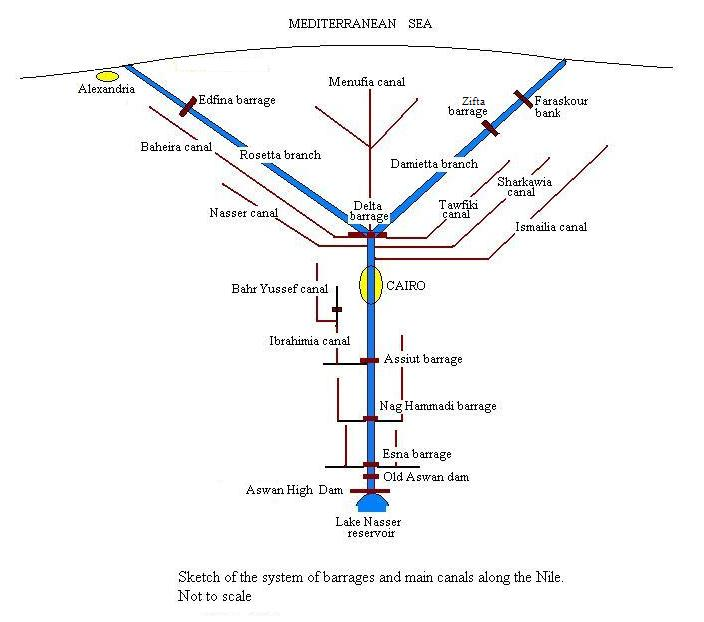
Main irrigation systems (schematically)

Due to the absence of appreciable rainfall, Egypt's agriculture depends entirely on irrigation. With irrigation, two harvests per year are possible, except for sugar cane which has a growing period of almost one year.

The high dam at Aswan releases, on average, 55 cubic kilometres (45,000,000 acre⋅ft) water per year, of which some 46 cubic kilometres (37,000,000 acre⋅ft) are diverted into the irrigation canals.

In the Nile valley and delta, almost 336,000 square kilometres (130,000 sq mi) benefit from these waters producing on average 1.8 crops per year. The annual crop consumptive use of water is about 38 cubic kilometres (31,000,000 acre⋅ft). Hence, the overall irrigation efficiency is 38/46 = 0.826 or 83%. This is a relatively high irrigation efficiency. The field irrigation efficiencies are much less, but the losses are reused downstream. This continuous reuse accounts for the high overall efficiency.

The following table shows the distribution of irrigation water over the branch canals taking off from the one main irrigation canal, the Mansuriya Canal near Giza.

Branch canal	Water delivery in m^{3}/feddan *
Kafret Nasser	4,700
Beni Magdul	3,500
El Mansuria	3,300
El Hammami upstream	2,800
El Hammami downstream	1,800
El Shimi	1,200

* Period 1 March to 31 July. 1 feddan is 0.42 ha or about 1 acre.
* Data from the Egyptian Water Use Management Project (EWUP)

The salt concentration of the water in the Aswan reservoir is about 0.25 kilograms per cubic metre (0.42 lb/cu yd), a very low salinity level. At an annual inflow of 55 cubic kilometres (45,000,000 acre⋅ft), the annual salt influx reaches 14 million tons. The average salt concentration of the drainage water evacuated into the sea and the coastal lakes is 2.7 kilograms per cubic metre (4.6 lb/cu yd). At an annual discharge of 10 cubic kilometres (2.4 cu mi) (not counting the 2 kilograms per cubic metre [3.4 lb/cu yd] of salt intrusion from the sea and the lakes, see figure "Water balances"), the annual salt export reaches 27 million ton. In 1995, the output of salt was higher than the influx, and Egypt's agricultural lands were desalinizing. Part of this could be due to the large number of subsurface drainage projects executed in the last decades to control the water table and soil salinity.

Drainage through subsurface drains and drainage channels is essential to prevent a deterioration of crop yields from waterlogging and soil salinization caused by irrigation. By 2003, more than 20,000 square kilometres (7,700 sq mi) have been equipped with a subsurface drainage system and approximately 7.2 square kilometres (2.8 sq mi) of water is drained annually from areas with these systems. The total investment cost in agricultural drainage over 27 years from 1973 to 2002 was about $3.1 billion covering the cost of design, construction, maintenance, research and training. During this period 11 large-scale projects were implemented with financial support from World Bank and other donors.

== Effects ==
The High Dam has resulted in protection from floods and droughts, an increase in agricultural production and employment, electricity production, and improved navigation that also benefits tourism. Conversely, the dam flooded a large area, causing the relocation of over 100,000 people. Many archaeological sites were submerged while others were relocated. The dam is blamed for coastline erosion, soil salinity, and health problems.

The assessment of the costs and benefits of the dam remains controversial decades after its completion. According to one estimate, the annual economic benefit of the High Dam immediately after its completion was E£255 million, $587 million using the exchange rate in 1970 of $2.30 per E£1: E£140 million from agricultural production, E£100 million from hydroelectric generation, E£10 million from flood protection, and E£5 million from improved navigation. At the time of its construction, total cost, including unspecified "subsidiary projects" and the extension of electric power lines, amounted to E£450 million. Not taking into account the negative environmental and social effects of the dam, its costs are thus estimated to have been recovered within only two years. One observer notes: "The impacts of the Aswan High Dam (...) have been overwhelmingly positive. Although the Dam has contributed to some environmental problems, these have proved to be significantly less severe than was generally expected, or currently believed by many people." Another observer disagreed and he recommended that the dam should be torn down. Tearing it down would cost only a fraction of the funds required for "continually combating the dam's consequential damage" and 500,000 hectares (1,900 sq mi) of fertile land could be reclaimed from the layers of mud on the bed of the drained reservoir. Samuel C. Florman wrote about the dam: "As a structure it is a success. But in its effect on the ecology of the Nile Basin – most of which could have been predicted – it is a failure".

Periodic floods and droughts have affected Egypt since ancient times. The dam mitigated the effects of floods, such as those in 1964, 1973, and 1988. Navigation along the river has been improved, both upstream and downstream of the dam. Sailing along the Nile is a favorite tourism activity, which is mainly done during the winter when the natural flow of the Nile would have been too low to allow navigation of cruise ships. A new fishing industry has been created around Lake Nasser, though it is struggling due to its distance from any significant markets. The annual production was about 35,000 tons in the mid-1990s. Factories for the fishing industry and packaging have been set up near the Lake.

According to a 1971 CIA declassified report, although the High Dam has not created ecological problems as serious as some observers have charged, its construction has brought economic losses as well as gains. These losses derive largely from the settling in dam's lake of the rich silt traditionally borne by the Nile. To date (1971), the main impact has been on the fishing industry. Egypt's Mediterranean catch, which once averaged 35,000–40,000 tons annually, has shrunk to 20,000 tons or less, largely because the loss of plankton nourished by the silt has eliminated the sardine population in Egyptian waters. Fishing in high dam's lake may in time at least partly offset the loss of saltwater fish, but only the most optimistic estimates place the eventual catch as high as 15,000–20,000 tons. Lack of continuing silt deposits at the mouth of the river also has contributed to a serious erosion problem. Commercial fertilizer requirements and salination and drainage difficulties, already large in perennially irrigated areas of Lower and Middle Egypt, will be somewhat increased in Upper Egypt by the change to perennial irrigation.

=== Drought protection, agricultural production and employment ===
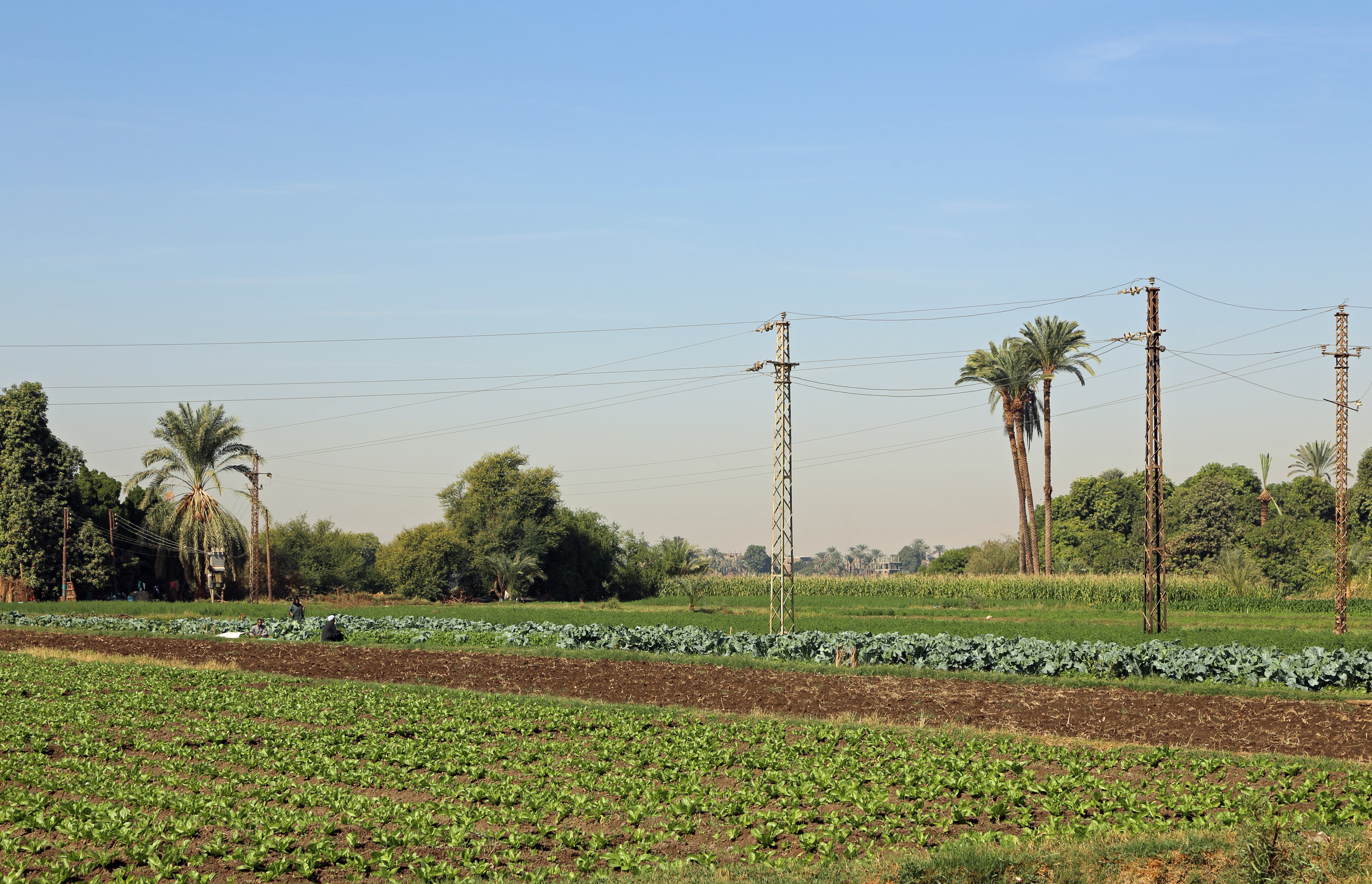
The Egyptian countryside benefited from the Aswan High Dam through improved irrigation as well as electrification, as shown here in Al Bayadiyah, south of Luxor

The dams also protected Egypt from the droughts in 1972–1973 and 1983–1987 that devastated East and West Africa. The High Dam allowed Egypt to reclaim about 2.0 million feddan (840,000 hectares) in the Nile Delta and along the Nile Valley, increasing the country's irrigated area by a third. The increase was brought about both by irrigating what used to be desert and by bringing under cultivation of 385,000 hectares (950,000 acres) that were previously used as flood retention basins. About half a million families were settled on these new lands. In particular the area under rice and sugar cane cultivation increased. In addition, about 1 million feddan (420,000 hectares), mostly in Upper Egypt, were converted from flood irrigation with only one crop per year to perennial irrigation allowing two or more crops per year. On other previously irrigated land, yields increased because water could be made available at critical low-flow periods. For example, wheat yields in Egypt tripled between 1952 and 1991 and better availability of water contributed to this increase. Most of the 32 km^{3} of freshwater, or almost 40 percent of the average flow of the Nile that were previously lost to the sea every year could be put to beneficial use. While about 10 km^{3} of the water saved is lost due to evaporation in Lake Nasser, the amount of water available for irrigation still increased by 22 km^{3}. Other estimates put evaporation from Lake Nasser at between 10 and 16 cubic km per year.

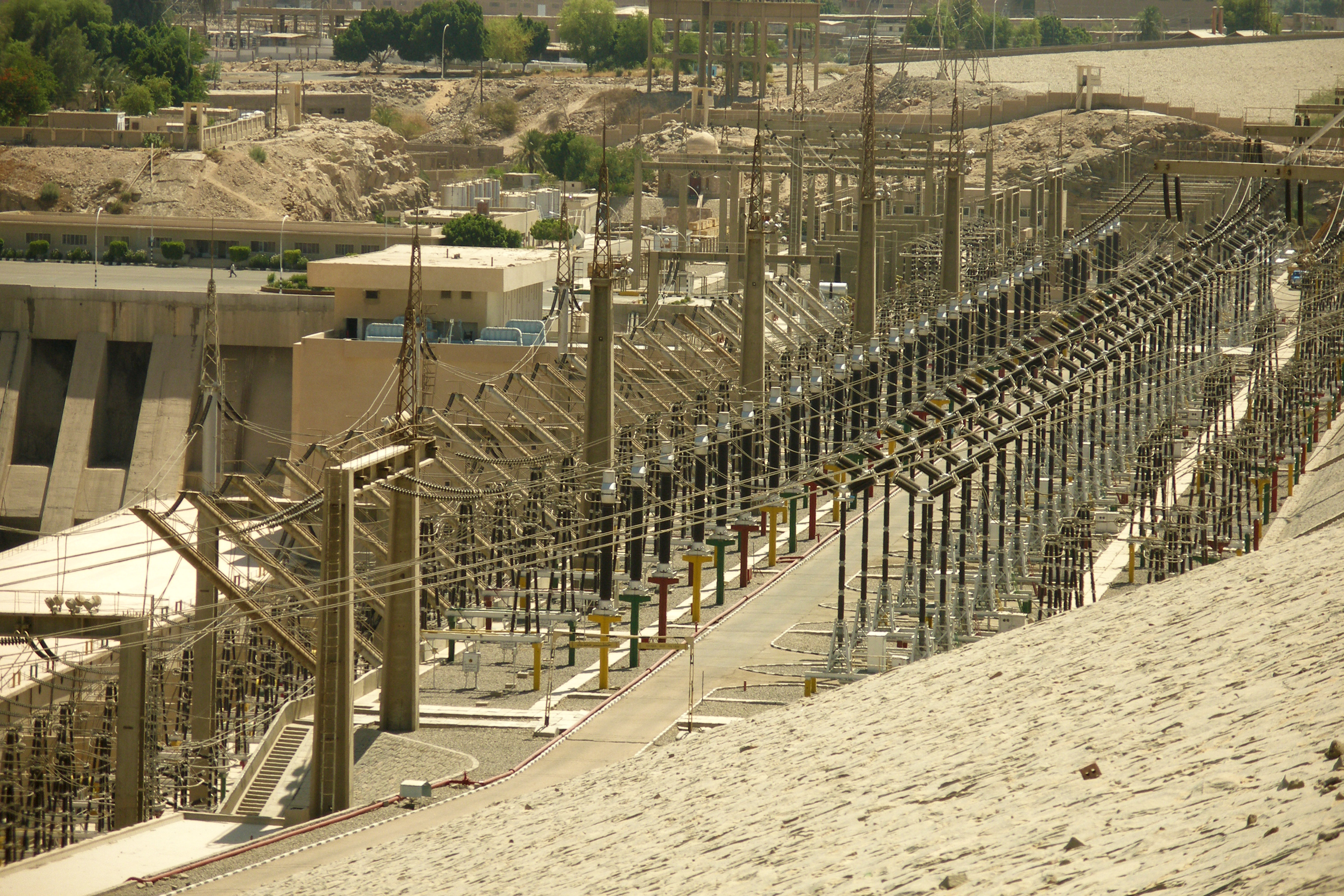
Power pylons at the power plant of the Aswan High Dam

=== Electricity production ===
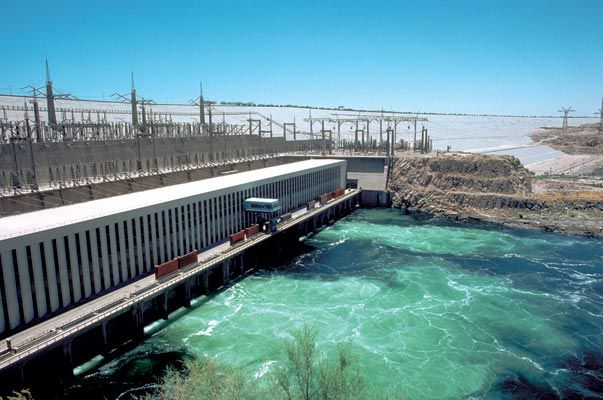
Power plant of the Aswan High Dam, with the dam itself in the background

The dam powers twelve generators each rated at 175 megawatts (235,000 hp), with a total of 2.1 gigawatts (2,800,000 hp). Power generation began in 1967. When the High Dam first reached peak output in 1970, it produced around half of Egypt's production of electric power (about 15 percent by 1998), and it gave most Egyptian villages the use of electricity for the first time. The High Dam has also improved the efficiency and the extension of the Old Aswan Hydropower stations by regulating upstream flows. At the time of completion, it was the largest power station in Africa and the 6th largest hydroelectric power station in the world.

All High Dam power facilities were completed ahead of schedule. Twelve turbines were installed and tested, giving the plant an installed capacity of 2,100 megawatts (MW), or more than twice the national total in 1960. With this capacity, the Aswan plant can produce 10 billion kWh of energy yearly. Two 500-kilovolt trunk lines to Cairo have been completed, and initial transmission problems, stemming mainly from poor insulators, were solved. Also, the damage inflicted on a main transformer station in 1968 by Israeli commandos has been repaired, and the Aswan plant is fully integrated with the power network in Lower Egypt. By a 1971 estimation, power output at Aswan would not reach much more than half of the plant's theoretical capacity, because of limited water supplies and the differing seasonal water-use patterns for irrigation and power production. Agricultural demand for water in the summer exceeds the amount needed to meet the comparatively low summer demand for electric power. Heavy summer irrigation use, however, would leave insufficient water under Egyptian control to permit hydroelectric power production at full capacity in the winter. Technical studies indicate that a maximum annual output of 5 billion kWh appears to be all that can be sustained due to fluctuations in Nile flows. Aswan High Dam electricity production is expected to be impacted by upstream mega-dams during extended drought periods.

=== Dangers ===
A 2024 study by Nicol-André Berdellé found that an overflow and subsequent collapse of the Aswan High Dam would be catastrophic to Egypt, as it would likely destroy most of the developed areas in the country and cause tens of millions of casualties. Because of the large volume of Nasser Lake and the rapid time-scale of such an event, it would be among the most violent flooding events in history. The affected land would be impossible to farm afterward due to rigid sediment that would cover much of the farmland, which would then cause widespread famine in Egypt.

Plausible causes of such an event cited by Berdellé include a failure of the Grand Ethiopian Renaissance Dam, a military attack on the dam, or an exceptionally high annual Nile flood. Due to the continuing deposition of sediment on the bottom of Nasser lake, Berdellé said that such an event will become more likely every year and will happen in several decades unless action is taken. Berdellé said that the reservoir is operated at unsafe water levels and called on Egyptian authorities to limit water levels and deepen the Toshka spillway.

=== Resettlement and compensations ===
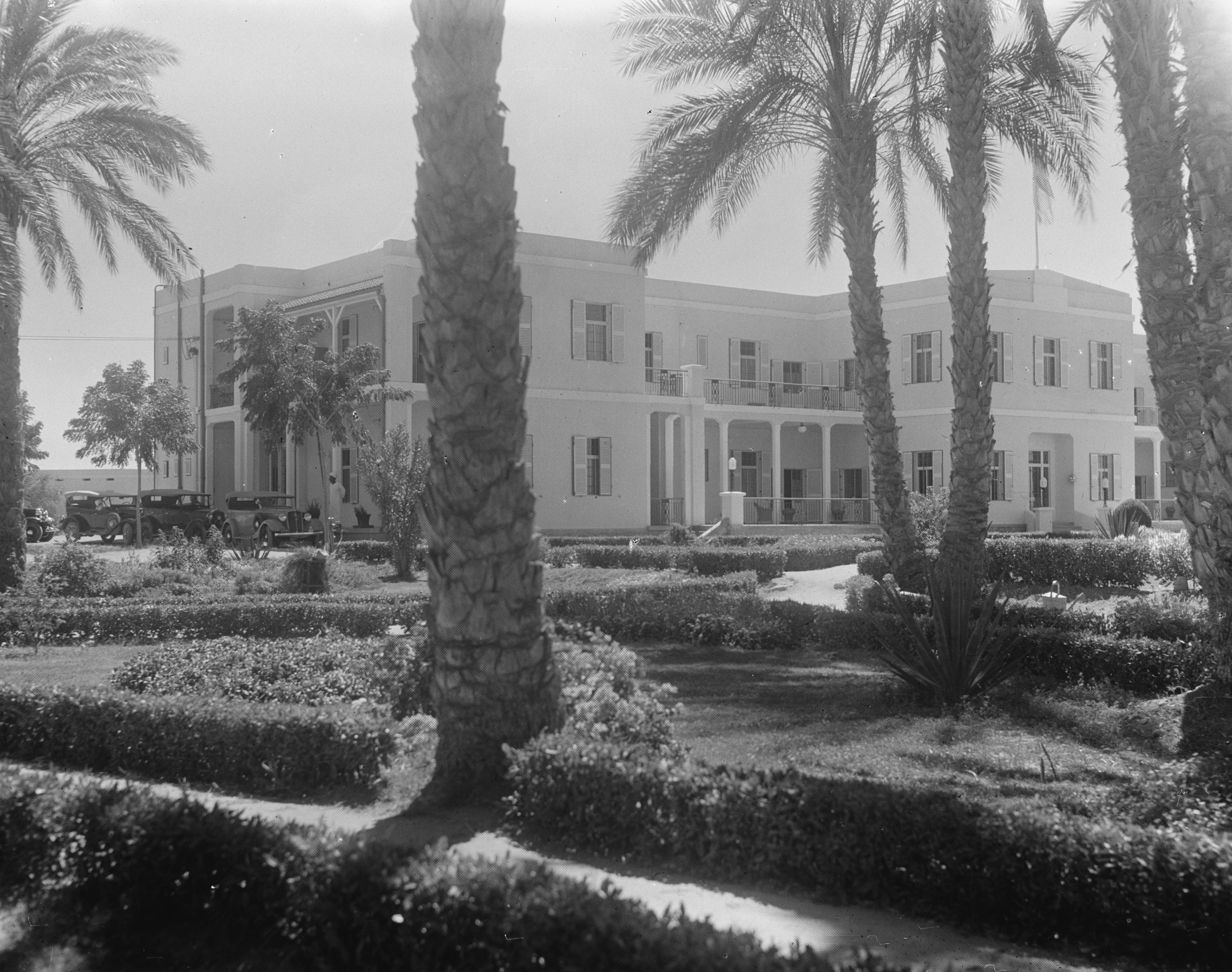
A picture of the old Wadi Halfa town that was flooded by Lake Nasser

Lake Nasser flooded much of lower Nubia and 100,000 to 120,000 people were resettled in Sudan and Egypt.

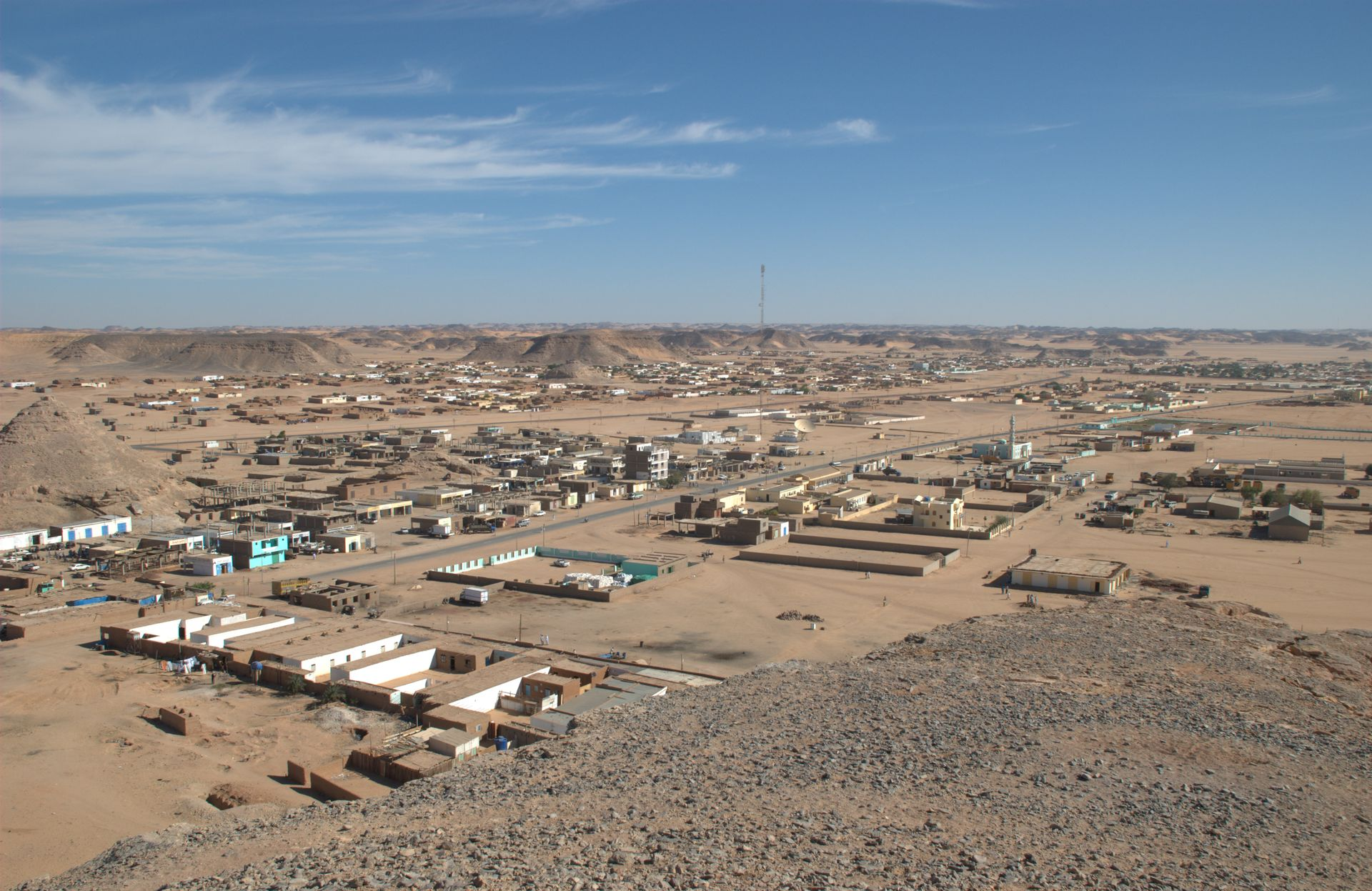
View of New Wadi Halfa, a settlement created on the shore of Lake Nasser to house part of the resettled population from the Old Wadi Halfa town

In Sudan, 50,000 to 70,000 Sudanese Nubians were moved from the old town of Wadi Halfa and its surrounding villages. Some were moved to a newly created settlement on the shore of Lake Nasser called New Wadi Halfa, and some were resettled approximately 700 kilometres (430 mi) south to the semi-arid Butana plain near the town of Khashm el-Girba up the Atbara River. The climate there had a regular rainy season as opposed to their previous desert habitat in which virtually no rain fell. The government developed an irrigation project, called the New Halfa Agricultural Development Scheme to grow cotton, grains, sugar cane and other crops. The Nubians were resettled in twenty five planned villages that included schools, medical facilities, and other services, including piped water and some electrification.

In Egypt, the majority of the 50,000 Nubians were moved three to ten kilometers from the Nile near Edna and Kom Ombo, 45 kilometers (28 mi) downstream from Aswan in what was called "New Nubia". Housing and facilities were built for 47 village units whose relationship to each other approximated that in Old Nubia. Irrigated land was provided to grow mainly sugar cane.

In 2019–20, Egypt started to compensate the Nubians who lost their homes following the dam impoundment.

=== Archaeological sites ===
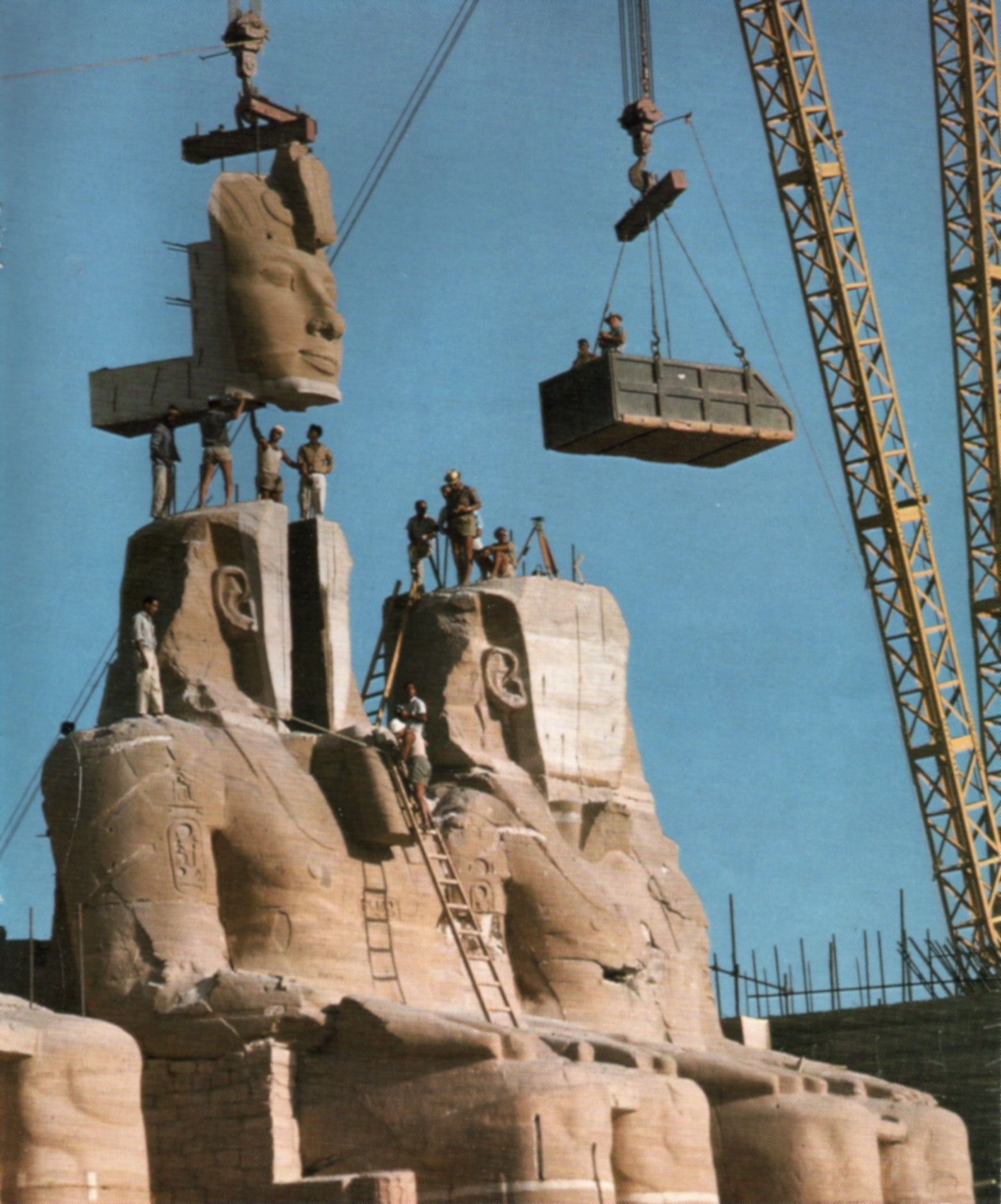
The statue of Ramses the Great at the Great Temple of Abu Simbel is reassembled after having been moved in 1967 to save it from being flooded.

Twenty-two monuments and architectural complexes that were threatened by flooding from Lake Nasser, including the Abu Simbel temples, were preserved by moving them to the shores of the lake under the UNESCO Nubia Campaign. Also moved were Philae, Kalabsha and Amada.

These monuments were granted to countries that helped with the works:

- The Debod temple to Madrid
- The Temple of Dendur to the Metropolitan Museum of Art of New York
- The Temple of Taffeh to the Rijksmuseum van Oudheden of Leiden
- The Temple of Ellesyia to the Museo Egizio of Turin

These items were removed to the garden area of the Sudan National Museum of Khartoum:

- The temple of Ramses II at Aksha
- The temple of Hatshepsut at Buhen
- The temple of Khnum at Kumma
- The tomb of the Nubian prince Djehuti-hotep at Debeira
- The temples of Dedwen and Sesostris III at Semna
- The granite columns from the Faras Cathedral
- A part of the paintings of the Faras Cathedral; the other part is in the National Museum of Warsaw.

The Temple of Ptah at Gerf Hussein had its free-standing section reconstructed at New Kalabsha, alongside the Temple of Kalabsha, Beit el-Wali, and the Kiosk of Qertassi.

The remaining archaeological sites, including the Buhen fort and the cemetery of Fadrus have been flooded by Lake Nasser.

=== Loss of sediments ===
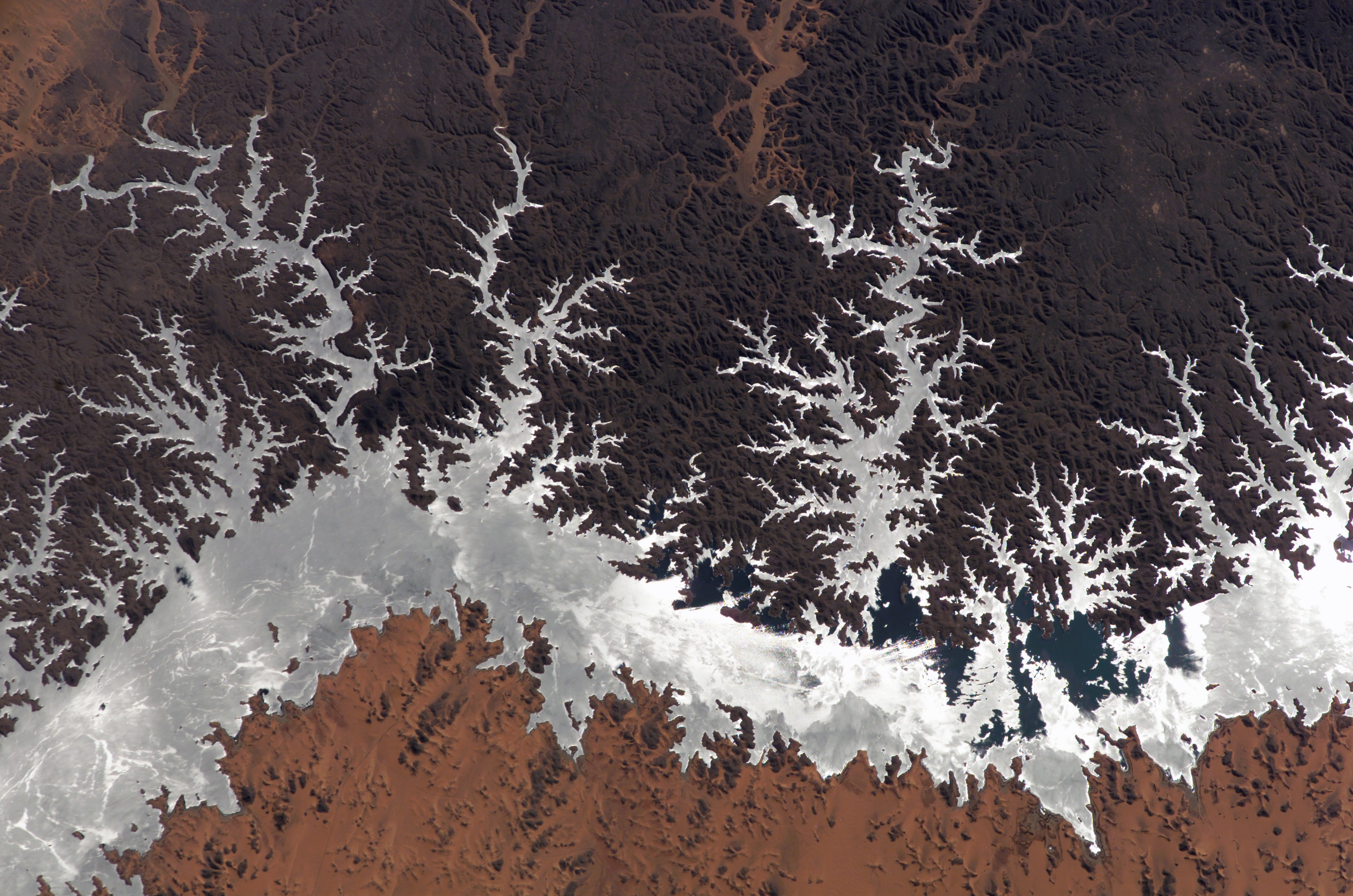
Lake Nasser behind the Aswan dam displaced more than 100,000 people and traps significant amounts of sediment.

Before the construction of the High Dam, the Nile deposited sediments of various particle size – consisting of fine sand, silt and clay – on fields in Upper Egypt through its annual flood, contributing to soil fertility. However, the nutrient value of the sediment has often been overestimated. 88 percent of the sediment was carried to the sea before the construction of the High Dam. The nutrient value added to the land by the sediment was only 6,000 tons of potash, 7,000 tons of phosphorus pentoxide and 17,000 tons of nitrogen. These amounts are insignificant compared to what is needed to reach the yields achieved today in Egypt's irrigation. Also, the annual spread of sediment due to the Nile floods occurred along the banks of the Nile. Areas far from the river which never received the Nile floods before are now being irrigated.

A more serious issue of trapping of sediment by the dam is that it has increased coastline erosion surrounding the Nile Delta. There is a lack of reliable statistics.

=== Waterlogging and increase in soil salinity ===
Before the construction of the High Dam, groundwater levels in the Nile Valley fluctuated 8–9 m (26–30 ft) per year with the water level of the Nile. During summer when evaporation was highest, the groundwater level was too deep to allow salts dissolved in the water to be pulled to the surface through capillary action. With the disappearance of the annual flood and heavy year-round irrigation, groundwater levels remained high with little fluctuation leading to waterlogging. Soil salinity also increased because the distance between the surface and the groundwater table was small enough (1–2 m depending on soil conditions and temperature) to allow water to be pulled up by evaporation so that the relatively small concentrations of salt in the groundwater accumulated on the soil surface over the years. Since most of the farmland did not have proper subsurface drainage to lower the groundwater table, salinization gradually affected crop yields. Drainage through sub-surface drains and drainage channels is essential to prevent a deterioration of crop yields from soil salinization and waterlogging. By 2003, more than 2 million hectares have been equipped with a subsurface drainage system at a cost from 1973 to 2002 of about $3.1 billion.

=== Health ===
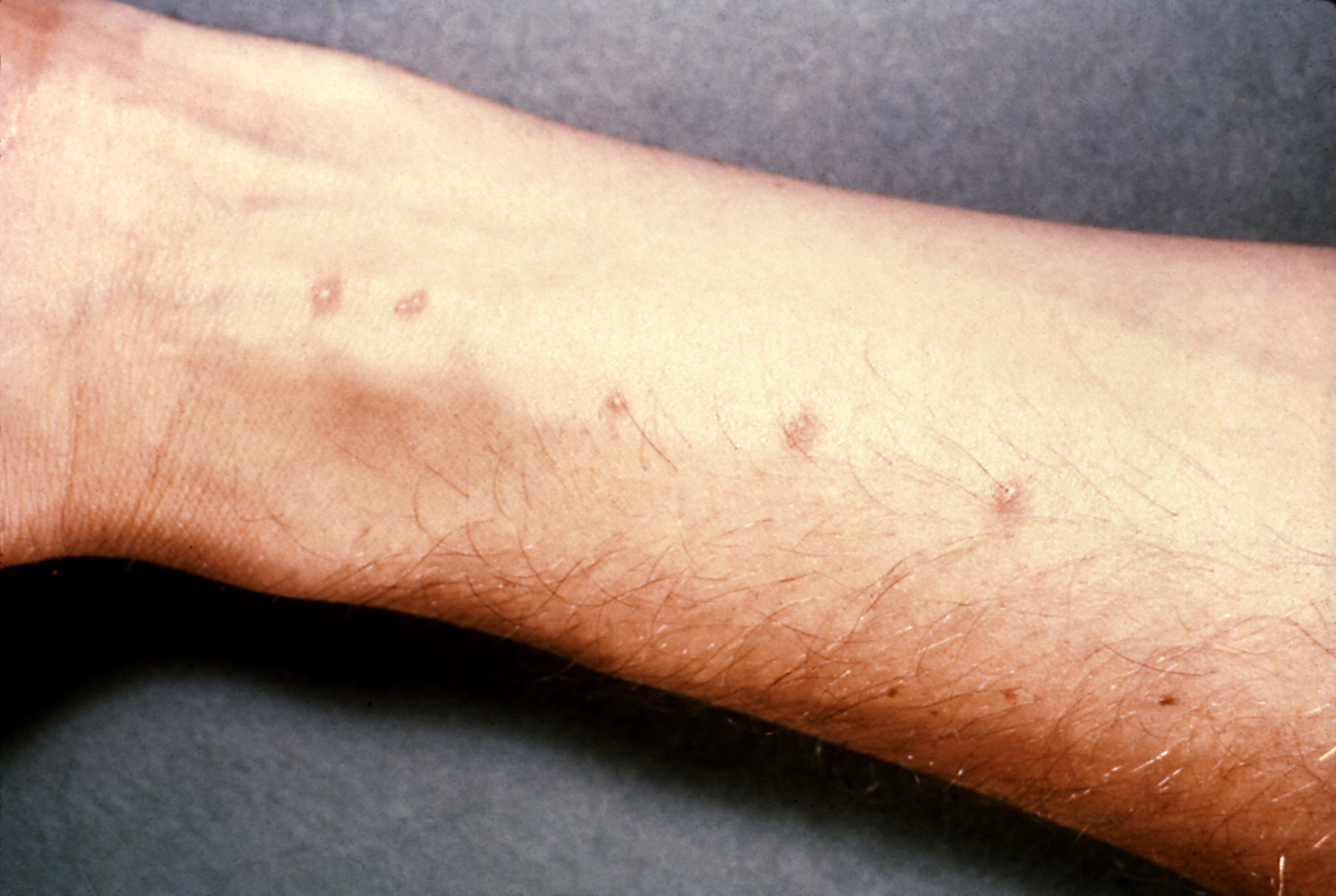
Skin vesicles: a symptom of schistosomiasis. A more common symptom is blood in the urine.

Contrary to many predictions made prior to the Aswan High Dam construction and publications that followed, that the prevalence of schistosomiasis (bilharzia) — a tropical disease spread by contact with fresh water contaminated with parasitic flatworms — would increase, it did not. This assumption did not take into account the extent of perennial irrigation that was already present throughout Egypt decades before the high dam closure. By the 1950s only a small proportion of Upper Egypt had not been converted from basin (low transmission) to perennial (high transmission) irrigation. Expansion of perennial irrigation systems in Egypt did not depend on the high dam. In fact, within 15 years of the high dam closure there was solid evidence that bilharzia was declining in Upper Egypt. S. haematobium has since disappeared altogether. Suggested reasons for this include improvements in irrigation practice. In the Nile Delta, schistosomiasis had been highly endemic, with prevalence in the villages 50% or higher for almost a century before. This was a consequence of the conversion of the Delta to perennial irrigation to grow long staple cotton by the British. This has changed. Large-scale treatment programmes in the 1990s using single-dose oral medication contributed greatly to reducing the prevalence and severity of S. mansoni in the Delta.

=== Other effects ===
Sediment deposited in the reservoir is lowering the water storage capacity of Lake Nasser. The reservoir storage capacity is 162 km^{3}, including 31 km^{3} dead storage at the bottom of the lake below 147 m (482 ft) above sea level, 90 km^{3} live storage, and 41 km^{3} of storage for high flood waters above 175 m (574 ft) above sea level. The annual sediment load of the Nile is about 134 million tons. This means that the dead storage volume would be filled up after 300–500 years if the sediment accumulated at the same rate throughout the area of the lake. Obviously sediment accumulates much faster at the upper reaches of the lake, where sedimentation has already affected the live storage zone.

Before the construction of the High Dam, the 50,000 km (31,000 mi) of irrigation and drainage canals in Egypt had to be dredged regularly to remove sediments. After construction of the dam, aquatic weeds grew much faster in the clearer water, helped by fertilizer residues. The total length of the infested waterways was about 27,000 km (17,000 mi) in the mid-1990s. Weeds have been gradually brought under control by manual, mechanical and biological methods.

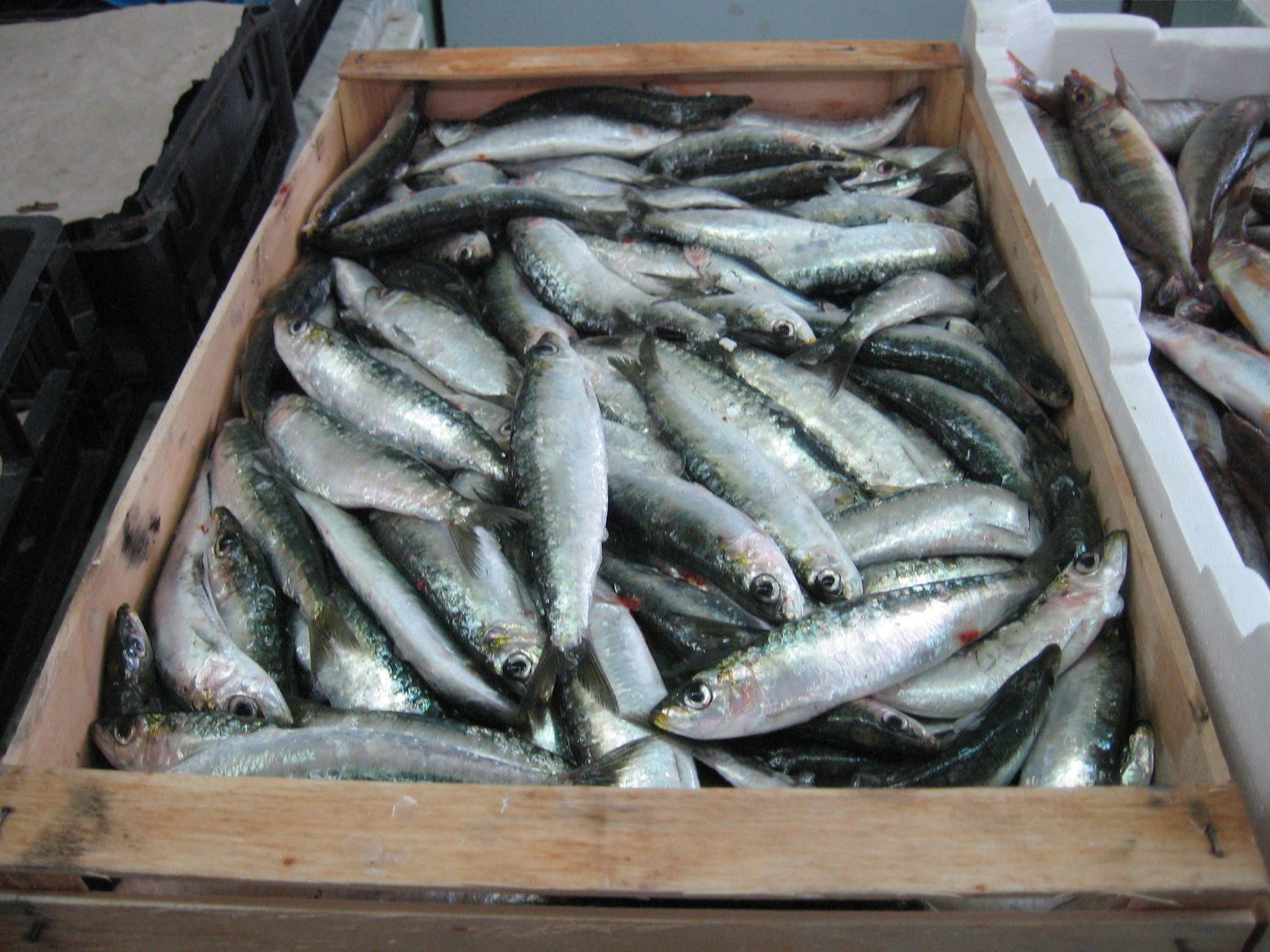
The catch of sardines in the Mediterranean off the Egyptian coast declined after the Aswan Dam was completed, but the exact reasons for the decline are still disputed.

Mediterranean fishing and brackish water lake fishery declined after the dam was finished because nutrients that flowed down the Nile to the Mediterranean were trapped behind the dam. For example, the sardine catch off the Egyptian coast declined from 18,000 tons in 1962 to a mere 460 tons in 1968, but then gradually recovered to 8,590 tons in 1992. A scientific article in the mid-1990s noted that "the mismatch between low primary productivity and relatively high levels of fish production in the region still presents a puzzle to scientists."

A concern before the construction of the High Dam had been the potential drop in river-bed level downstream of the Dam as the result of erosion caused by the flow of sediment-free water. Estimates by various national and international experts put this drop at between and 2 and 10 meters (6.6 and 32.8 ft). However, the actual drop has been measured at 0.3–0.7 meters (0.98–2.30 ft), much less than expected.

The red-brick construction industry, which consisted of hundreds of factories that used Nile sediment deposits along the river, has also been negatively affected. Deprived of sediment, they started using the older alluvium of otherwise arable land taking out of production up to 120 square kilometers (46 sq mi) annually, with an estimated 1,000 square kilometers (390 sq mi) destroyed by 1984 when the government prohibited, "with only modest success," further excavation. According to one source, bricks are now being made from new techniques which use a sand-clay mixture and it has been argued that the mud-based brick industry would have suffered even if the dam had not been built.

Because of the lower turbidity of the water sunlight penetrates deeper in the Nile water. Because of this and the increased presence of nutrients from fertilizers in the water, more algae grow in the Nile. This in turn increases the costs of drinking water treatment. Apparently few experts had expected that water quality in the Nile would actually decrease because of the High Dam.

== See also ==
- Closure of the Suez Canal (1967–1975)
- Energy in Egypt
- Egyptian Public Works
- List of conventional hydroelectric power stations
- List of largest dams
- List of power stations in Egypt
- Water politics in the Nile Basin
- 2025 Egyptian–Ethiopian crisis
