= Assiut Barrage =

Dam in Asyut, Egypt

Coordinates: 27°12′11″N 31°11′25″E

The Assiut Barrage
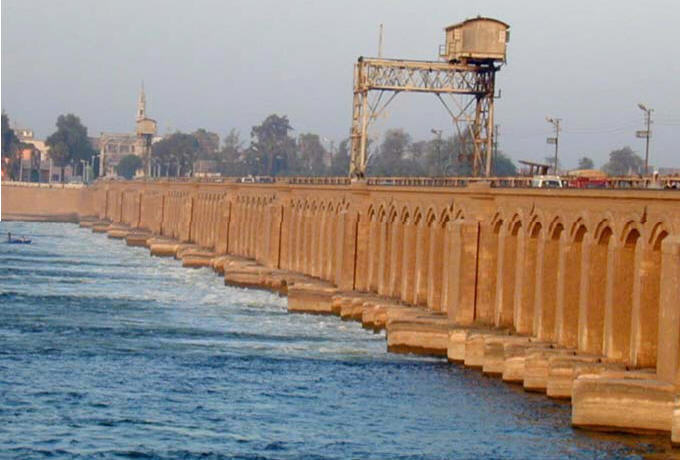
- Assiut Barrage Completed in 1903
- Interactive map of The Assiut Barrage
- Country: Egypt
- Location: Asyut
- Construction began: 1898
- Opening date: 1903
- Construction cost: £870,000
- Built by: John Aird & Co.

Dam and spillways
- Type of dam: Barrage
- Impounds: Nile River
- Height (thalweg): 48 feet (15 m)
- Spillways: 111

Reservoir
- Maximum water depth: 33.5 feet (10.2 m)

The Assiut Barrage is a dam on the Nile River in the city of Assiut in Upper Egypt (250 miles to the south of Cairo). It was completed in 1903.

== Background ==
It was designed by the famous British engineer Sir William Willcocks who also concurrently designed and built the Aswan Low Dam, the first Nile reservoir, about 350 miles (560 km) up-stream. The Assiut dam was constructed between 1898 and 1903, and in conjunction with the reservoir, provided for the diversion of river water into Egypt's largest irrigation canal, the Ibrahimiya Canal, during the low water season. The dam was estimated to cost £525,000 but by the time of its completion it actually cost £870,000. The main contractor for the project was the British contractor John Aird & Co. The project's massive size involved 2,400,000 cubic yards of earthwork, 125,000 cubic yards of concrete, 85,000 cubic yards of masonry, 125,000 cubic yards of pitching and more than 4,000 tons of cast iron pipes.

The dam consists of a masonry dam about 2,769 feet (844 m) long extended on both sides by earthen banks, making a total length of about 3,937 feet (1,200 m). There are 111 arched openings of 5 metres (16 feet 5 inches) span in the masonry dam. They can be closed by steel sluice-gates 16 feet (4.9 m) high. The piers and arches are founded upon a masonry platform 87 feet (27 m) wide by 10 feet (3.0 m) thick. This platform is protected on its up-stream and down-stream sides by a continuous and impermeable line of cast iron tongued and grooved sheet-piling with cemented joints. This piling extends into the sand bed of the river to a depth of 23 feet (7.0 m) below the upper surface of the platform and prevents it from being undermined. The river bed is protected against erosion for a width of 67 feet (20 m) upstream by a stone paving laid on a puddle clay blanket to check infiltration, and on the downstream side for the same width by a stone paving having an inverted filter bed underneath, so that any springs that may be caused by the water above the sluices shall not carry sand with them from beneath the paving.

The piers between the openings have a length of 51 feet (16 m) up and down stream and are 6.56 feet (2.00 m) wide with the exception of every thirtieth pier, which has double this width. The roadway is 41 feet (12 m) above the top of the masonry platform. The dam has a maximum height of about 48 feet (15 m), the maximum head of water retained being about 33.5 feet (10.2 m). It is constructed of granite, the foundation platform mentioned above being of concrete. A lock 262.5 feet (80.0 m) long by 52.8 feet (16.1 m) wide and capable of passing the largest Nile cargo ships and barges was constructed at the dam.

The Ibrahimiya head regulator structure, which was built at the same time when the Assiut Barrage was being constructed, was of similar design to the barrage except having only nine 5 m wide sluices, and a 9 m wide lock.

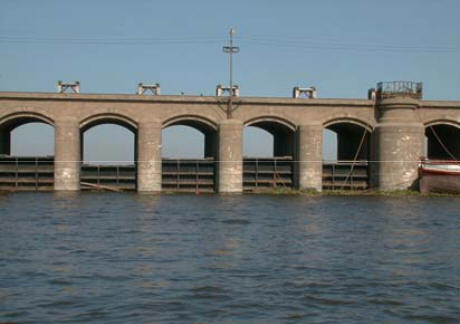
Ibrahimiya Canal Intake Regulator, also completed in 1902

== Assiut Barrages Repairs and Upgrades ==
Between 1934 and 1938 the Egyptian Government carried out extensive remodeling works at the barrage and the Ibrahimiya head regulator, principally extending the piers, grouting, extending the approach slabs and updating the hydro-mechanical equipment. The dam was remodeled in 1938 to increase the permissible head to 13.8-foot (4.2 m) from the 13.0-foot (4.0 m) head that was allowed under its original design. In 1956 works were carried out at the Ibrahimiya head regulator as a result of significant scour holes that developed downstream of the structure. Extensions to downstream concrete apron were completed as well as lengthening of the southern lock wall. Some further grouting works and replacement of the lock gates took place in the 1970s. In 1979 a reinforced concrete pedestrian footbridge was constructed on the downstream side of the head regulator. Between 1984 and 1986 a program of cement grouting works was undertaken at the barrage, though there are no records of the head regulator receiving similar treatment. After more than 100 years in service, the civil works have been affected by age and also by tailwater erosion as a consequence of a modified river regime after the construction of the Aswan High Dam.

== The Planned New Dam ==
Along with the Aswan Low Dam, the Assiut Dam today remains in service as the oldest dam on the Nile in Upper Egypt. The two other old dams (Naga Hamadi and Isna Barrages) were replaced with new dams in the 1990s. Between 2000 and 2005, the Egyptian government commissioned an extended Feasibility Study (FS) financed by the German government to investigate the options of rehabilitation of the existing Assiut Barrage and the Ibrahimiya head regulator against reconstruction of a new barrage with a hydro-power plant. German Consultants financed by the Kreditanstalt für Wiederaufbau (KfW) conducted the study and concluded that a new dam with power generating capabilities would be the most economic option. This new dam would provide an increase in the allowed head, allowing more water discharges into the Ibrahimiya Canal and will improve navigation conditions. The new dam will also include a low head hydropower plant providing about 40 Megawatts.

The decision taken upon the results of the feasibility study was to proceed with the project of constructing a new barrage 200-300m downstream of the existing barrage. The proposed dam components are:

1. Sluiceway: 8 radial gates, 17m wide
2. Hydropower plant: 4 turbines x 8MW
3. Additional navigation lock: 120 x 17m chamber
4. Closure dam: embankment type, 11m high
5. Rehabilitation of the existing navigation lock; and
6. Rehabilitation of the existing Ibrahimiya head regulator

There is a concern that the new maximum pool level will increase the groundwater levels in Assiut city and in some areas in the upstream. Dealing with this situation, different layouts of the project have been studied in the feasibility study and some mitigation measures have been suggested.
