= Ibrahimiya Canal =

Canal in Egypt

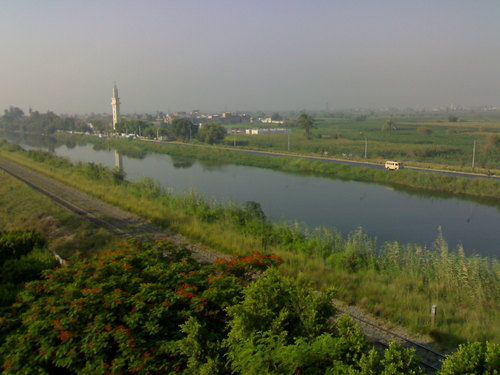
- Ibrahimiya Canal in Minya
- Interactive map of Ibrahimiya Canal
- Coordinates: 27°11′47″N 31°11′16″E

Specifications
- Length: 350 km (220 miles)

History
- Date completed: 1873; 153 years ago

The Ibrahimiyah Canal is an irrigation canal in Egypt built in 1873 during the reign of Ismail Pasha as Khedive of Egypt, the most important public work executed under the new Ministry of Public Works. It was commissioned by Bahgat Pasha, minister of public works, who designed it primarily to provide perennial irrigation to the Khedivial sugar estates in Middle Egypt. It supplied perennial irrigation to 580,000 acres (2,300 km^{2}) and flood irrigation to another 420,000 acres (1,700 km^{2}). The discharge of the canal varied between 30 and 80 cubic metres per second in summer and between 500 and 900 cubic metres per second in flood. Having its head on the left bank of the Nile, in Assiut, it runs northwards for 60 kilometres and then divides in Dairut into two main branches; one branch is the Bahr Yussef Canal, while the other is the Ibrahimiyah Canal proper.

This 350 kilometer long canal, which is undoubtedly one of the largest artificial canals in the world, used to take off from the Nile without any weirs or inlet works on the river (the water of the river entered it freely). Sir William Willcocks, the famous British civil engineer, would construct the Assiut Barrage later in 1901 to provide means for better control of its discharge.

Although locks were constructed through its southern third, Ibrahimya Canal is not navigable after Dairut as it was designed for irrigation purposes only. The Ibrahimiya, except at few locations where it follows portions of ancient canals, flows parallel to the Nile, and does not have between itself and the river a distance of more than 4 to 5 kilometres.

== Dairut Distribution Works ==
At its 60th kilometer at Dairut, Ibrahimiya Canal begins distribution of its water. At this point, the canal widens into a kind of basin, along which six works of distribution are constructed. They are:

1. Inlet of the Sahelieh Canal composed of two arches, 3 metres wide each.
2. Inlet of the Dairoutieh Canal, composed of three arches, 3 metres wide each.
3. Inlet of Bahr Yussef (the main irrigation canal for Faiyum), composed of five arches, 3 metres wide each. Bahr Yussef usually gets one third of the entire water of the Ibrahimiya Canal. It irrigates west of Minya, Beni Suef and Faiyum provinces.
4. Distribution work for Ibrahimiyah itself, composed of seven arches, 3 metres each and a lock 8.5 metres wide for navigation.
5. A reservoir to carry back to the Nile the surplus water of the canal. This works consists of five openings, 3-metre wide each and an 8.5 metre wide lock for navigation.
6. An inlet of two arches, 3-meter wide each, for filling several basins on the left bank of Bahr Yussef canal, and at a level too high to be filled with Bahr Yussef itself.

After Ibrahimiya leaves Dairut, a series of distribution works control water discharges along its route. They are :

1. Hafez Regulator: at kilometre 90 in Mallawi. The original regulator was abandoned and a new one was constructed in 1989 as part of the US funded Irrigation Improvements Project (IIP). Upstream of this regulator, on the left side is the intake for the Serry Canal, a major offshoot from Ibrahimiya, irrigating more than 140,000 acres (570 km^{2}) west of Minya.
2. Minya Regulator: at kilometre 120, in Minya. The old regulator (which is still used as a bridge) consists of three arches, 3 metres wide each. A new regulator 2 kilometers downstream of this old one was constructed in 1993 also as a part of the IIP project.
3. Matay Regulator: at kilometre 160. It also consists of three arches, 3 meters wide each.
4. Maghagha Regulator: at kilometre 188. Another structure with three arches, 3 metre wide each. It also has a weir.
5. Al Sharahnah Regulator: at kilometre 210. A 3-arch regulator and a siphon allowing drainage water to cross underneath the Ibrahimiya canal are found in this point.

After it leaves Al Sharahnah, the canal continues for about 140 kilometers but by the time it reaches Al Ayat in Giza, it is no longer a major canal, but rather a small irrigation canal with a width of 5 metres at the bottom.

== See also ==
- List of cities and towns in Egypt
