= Lucas Brothers =

Lucas Brothers may refer to:

- Lucas Brothers (company), British building business
- Kenny and Keith Lucas, comedic twin duo from Lucas Bros. Moving Co.
