= Hindiya Barrage =

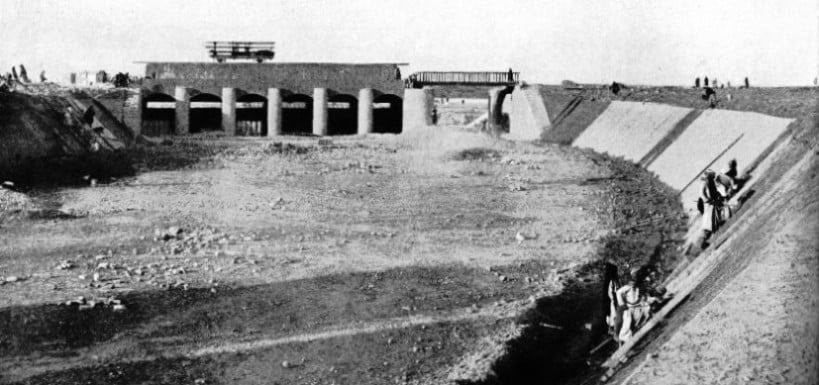
- During construction in 1911

- Location within Iraq
- Interactive map of Hindiya Barrage
- Location: Babil Governorate, Iraq
- Coordinates: 32°42′46″N 44°16′01″E
- Construction began: 1911
- Opening date: 1913

Dam and spillways
- Impounds: Euphrates
- Length: 250 m (820 ft)

The Hindiya Barrage is a barrage on the Euphrates south of the town of Musayyib in Babil Governorate of Iraq. Located north of the Al-Hindiya District, it was designed by British civil engineer William Willcocks in response to the silting up of the Hillah branch of the Euphrates. Construction of the dam, with a length of over 250 metres (820 ft), lasted between 1911 and 1913. Between 1984 and 1989, a new dam was built several kilometres upstream as a replacement for the Hindiya Barrage.

== Background and planning ==
Until 1875, the Euphrates split into two channels south of the town of Musayyib; the western Hindiya branch and the eastern Hillah branch. Due to changes in the water management of the wider Tigris–Euphrates river system in 1875, severe floodings of the Euphrates downstream from Fallujah occurred. As a result of these floodings, discharge into the lower Hindiya branch increased and the Hillah branch started to silt up. In 1909, discharge into the Hillah branch had been reduced to 300 cubic metres (11,000 cu ft) per second, compared to 2,000 cubic metres (71,000 cu ft) per second 50 years earlier. Because the town of Hillah is located on the Hillah branch of the Euphrates and depends on its waters for agriculture, a rubble embankment dam was constructed in the Hindiya branch to raise the water level of the Euphrates and increase the discharge into the Hillah branch. However, silting up of the Hillah branch continued and the dam was gradually being swept away by the continually increasing Euphrates discharge into the Hindiya branch. In 1908, the Ottoman government invited contractors to build a new dam based on revolutionary plans by a French engineer, but no company accepted the assignment.

After the Young Turk Revolution and the restructuring of the Ottoman government in 1908, British civil engineer William Willcocks, who had won recognition for his work on the Aswan Low Dam in Egypt, was tasked with the mapping of lower Iraq and the preparation of large-scale irrigation projects on both the Euphrates and the Tigris. Willcocks suggested to use the depressions of Habbaniyah and Abu Dibis, which he had recognised during his survey, as reservoirs for the excess floodwaters of the Euphrates, as well as to reconstruct the Hindiya Barrage so that the land around Hillah could be used for irrigated agriculture. Only the Hindiya Barrage would be completed before the outbreak of World War I.

== Construction ==
The Hindiya Barrage was constructed from 1911 to 1913, upstream from the old dam and next to the actual bed of the Hindiya branch. A new river bed leading up to and from the barrage was excavated and inundated after completion of the dam, and the old river bed was closed off by dams. Furthermore, because the barrage was also located upstream from the headwater of the Hillah branch, a new canal and headwater were excavated as well. The work was supervised by Willcocks and carried out by British engineering contractor John Jackson. The barrage is over 250 metres (820 ft) long and has 36 openings that are each 5 metres (16 ft) wide. It includes a lock for the passage of boats. The dam was upgraded in 1927. After the completion of the Hindiya Barrage, the remains of the old Ottoman dam were left in place, even though they inhibited ships to proceed further upstream, because it was feared that the new barrage could not fulfill its function. Apart from supplying water to the Hillah branch, the Hindiyah Barrage also supplies two other canals that run parallel and on either side of the Hindiya branch and are called the Beni Hasan and Kifil.

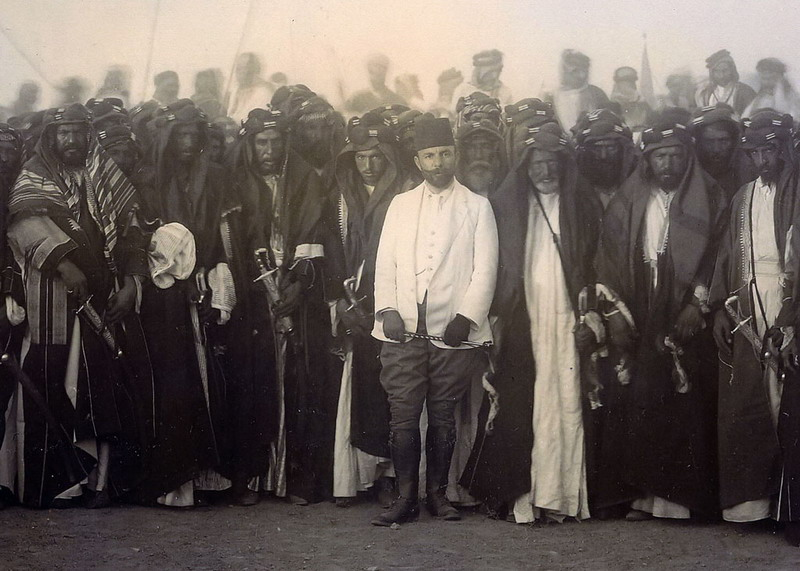

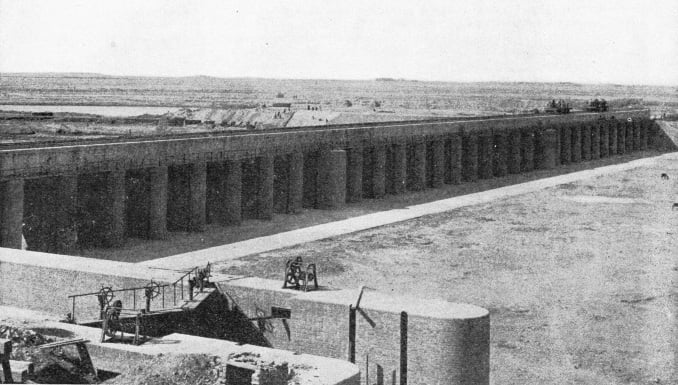

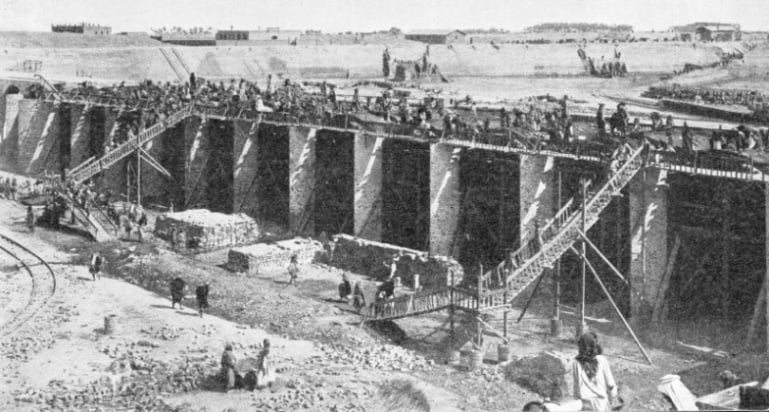

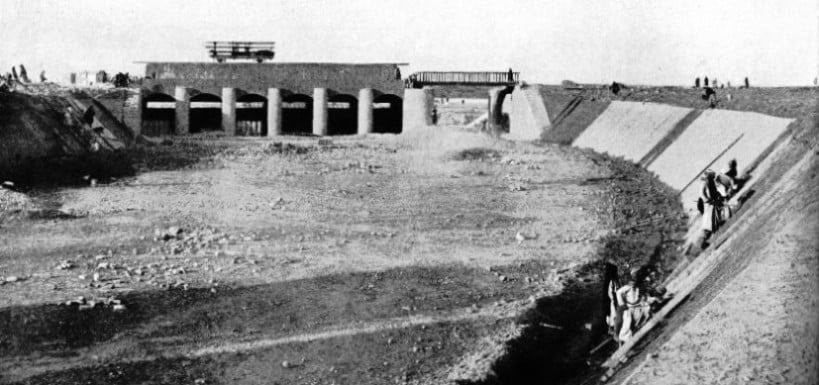

== New barrage ==
Between 1984 and 1989, a China State Construction Engineering built a new barrage closer to Musayyib to replace the old Hindiya Barrage at a cost of US$240 million. This new project included a hydroelectric power station, locks, a fish ladder and six new bridges over the Euphrates.
