= Lucas and Aird =

Civil engineering business operating in the 19th century

Lucas and Aird was a major civil engineering business operating in the 19th century.

== History ==
The business was formed as a joint venture between Lucas Brothers and John Aird & Co. in 1870. The joint venture was dissolved in 1896.

== Major projects ==
Major projects carried out by the firm included:

- The Welland Viaduct completed in 1870
- The Royal Albert Dock completed in 1880
- The Hull and Barnsley Railway completed in 1885
- The Suakin-Berber Railway completed in 1885
- The Tilbury Docks completed in 1886
- The Blackfriars Railway Bridge completed in 1886
- The West Highland Railway completed in 1895
- The Budleigh Salterton Railway completed in 1896
- The Plymouth to Yealmpton Branch completed in 1896
