= Al-Hindiya =

Al-Hindiya الهندية
- City
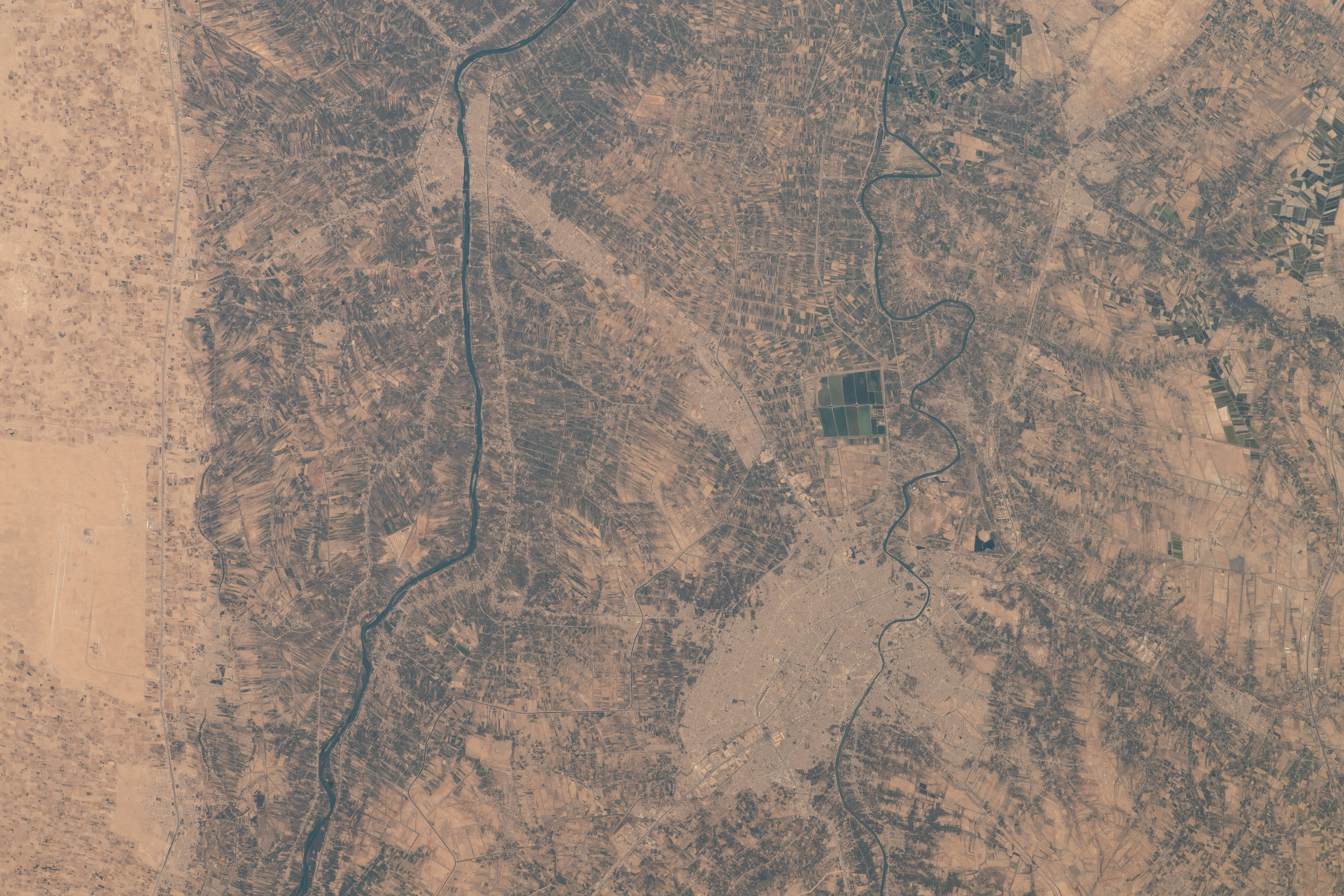
- Euphrates branch, Abu Gharaq corridor to Hillah

- Location within Iraq
- Coordinates: 32°32′39″N 44°13′11″E
- Country: Iraq
- Governorate: Kerbala
- Municipality: Al-Hindiya District

Population (2018)
  - Total: 84,100

Al-Hindiya or Hindiya (Arabic: الهندية) lit. "The Indian" is a city in Iraq on the Euphrates River. Al-Hindiya is located in the Karbala Governorate and is the seat of Al-Hindiya District. The city used to be known as Tuwairij (Arabic: طويريج), which gives name to the "Tuwairij run" (Arabic: ركضة طويريج) that takes place here every year as part of the Mourning of Muharram on the Day of Ashura. It has 84,100 citizens.

== History ==
The city was founded in 1793, during the Ottoman Iraq period, by "Muhammad Yahya Asif Al-Dawla Bahadur Al-Hindi" ( محمّد يحيى آصف الدولة بهادر الهندي), who was the first Nawab of Awadh. He funded digging a canal on the Euphrates to provide drinkable water for the region.

== Notable people ==
Nouri al Maliki went to school there in his younger days.
