= Sir John Aird, 1st Baronet =

British politician

John Aird
- Aird in his late years
- Born: 3 December 1833
- Died: 6 January 1911 (aged 77)

Sir John Aird, 1st Baronet (3 December 1833 – 6 January 1911) was an English civil engineering contractor of the late 19th and early 20th centuries. He also served as Conservative Member of Parliament (MP) for Paddington North from 1887 to 1906, was the first Mayor of Paddington in 1900, and became an enthusiastic collector of British art.

== Early life ==
Aird was the son of a former mason – also called John Aird (1806–1876) – who was superintendent of the Phoenix Gas Company's gasworks in Greenwich, south-east London before setting up his own contracting business, John Aird & Co., in 1848. On his 18th birthday in 1851, Aird junior joined the family firm – which subsequently traded as John Aird & Sons for a while. The business had initially focused on gas and water network installations, but soon expanded into more general building work.

== Engineering career ==
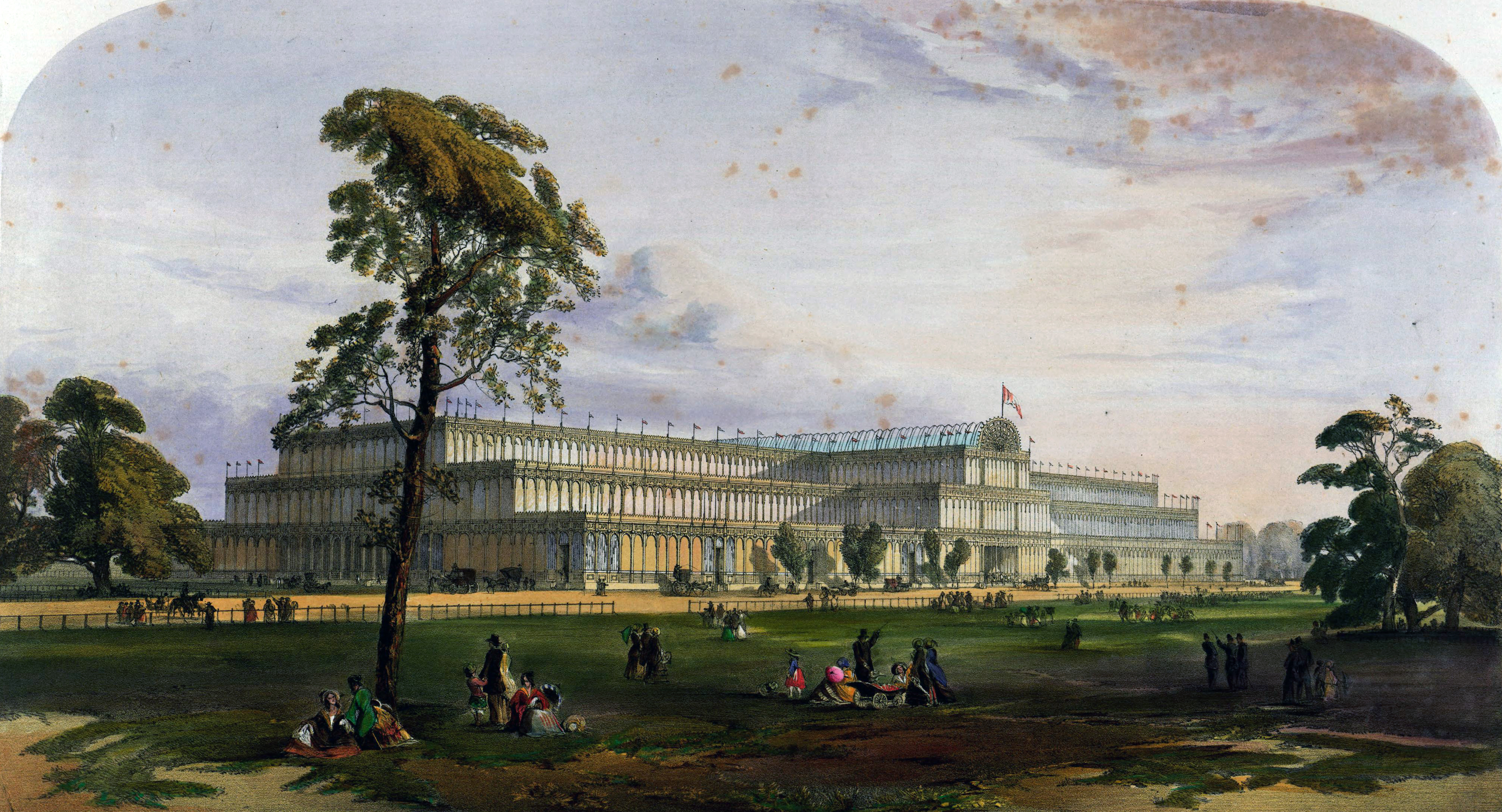
The 1851 Great Exhibition in Hyde Park

John Aird's first significant scheme was the dismantling, transportation and re-erection of The Crystal Palace buildings from the 1851 Great Exhibition from central London's Hyde Park to Sydenham in south London.

Other company projects included the construction of reservoirs and of railways and docks work.

Aird became an associate of the Institution of Civil Engineers in 1859.

After the firm merged with Lucas Brothers and his father's death John Aird junior became chief partner and the name of the business reverted to John Aird & Co. in 1895.

Under Aird's leadership, the firm also became internationally famous for building the first Aswan Dam between 1899 and 1902. Sir John and his son Malcolm were present in Egypt for the opening of the dam in December 1902, during which he received the Grand Cordon of the Order of the Medjidie from the Khedive. The business was also later engaged to increase the height of the dam.

== Political career ==
Aird served as Member of Parliament for Paddington North from 1887 to 1906. In 1900, he became the first mayor of the Metropolitan Borough of Paddington, serving two terms until 1902.

== Personal life and family ==
Aird married Sarah Smith of Lewisham on 6 September 1855 and they had eight children: John (who became, in succession to his father, Sir John Aird, 2nd Baronet), Malcolm, Sarah, Jessie, Ada, Vida, Gertrude, and Dorothy.

== Retirement ==
Aird was created a baronet on Lord Salisbury's recommendation on 5 March 1901. He died in January 1911 at his country home of Wilton Park in Beaconsfield, Buckinghamshire and he was buried in the churchyard of St Anne's Church, Dropmore, alongside his wife Sarah who died on 4 April 1909.

== Legacy ==
John Aird Court, a social housing estate in Little Venice, west London is named after him, in the area which would have formed part of his constituency and been in the original Paddington borough.

== Arms ==
Coat of arms of Sir John Aird, 1st Baronet

Crest
Upon a bull-headed rail fesswise a lion rampant holding between the paws a spike all Proper.
Escutcheon
Gules on a chevron between in chief two wolves' heads erased and in base an increscent between the horns a mullet of six point all Argent two falcons' heads erased Sable.
Motto
Vigilantiâ

Parliament of the United Kingdom
Preceded by Lionel Cohen	Member of Parliament for Paddington North; 1887 – 1906	Succeeded by Leo Chiozza Money
Baronetage of the United Kingdom
New creation	Baronet (of London); 1901–1911	Succeeded by John Aird
