= Al-Hindiya District =

- Location within Iraq
- Coordinates: 32.540801°N 44.174617°E
- Country: Iraq
- Governorate: Karbala Governorate
- Seat: Al-Hindiya
- Elevation: 30 m (98 ft)

Population
  - Total: 243,720
- Time zone: UTC+3 (AST)

Al-Hindiya District (Arabic: قضاء الهندية, romanized: Qadaa Al-Hindiya) Is a district in Karbala Governornate. (formerly belonged to Babil Governorate) Its largest town is Al-Hindiya, to the east of Karbala. The Hindiya Barrage in the north of the district controls floods and diverts water from the Euphrates into irrigation canals on both sides of the river. The district has been the scene of clashes with Turkish and British colonial forces, and more recently with American troops in 2003. The population is about 230,000, mostly Shia, including significant numbers of refugees. Infrastructure is poor, but efforts are being made to improve it. In late December 2024 and early 2025, as a joke, declaration of independence by a group of members was announced by editing the Wikipedia (The free encyclopedia) page of the district.

== Geography ==
The country is the easternmost of Karbala Governorate and is bordered by Babil Governorate to.". tte east. It lies to the south of Baghdad and west of ancient Babylon. The Euphrates flows through the district from north to south. The principal town is Al-Hindiya, which lies on the road from Karbala to the west and Hillah to the east. The district is at an altitude of about 30 metres (98 ft) above sea level. Observations of rainfall at Hindiya in the 1920s and 1930s gave a mean annual precipitation of 160 millimetres (6.3 in), but there were wide variances from a maximum of 568 millimetres (22.4 in) to a minimum of 37 millimetres (1.5 in).

== History ==
The city takes its name from the seat city, Al-Hindiya, which was founded in 1793 AD by "Yahya Asif Al-Dawla Bahadur Al-Hindi" (يحيى آصف الدولة بهادر الهندي), who was a vizier of Bahadur Shah Zafar. The vizier funded digging a canal on the Euphrates to provide drinkable water for the region.

The Hindiya city in the Ottoman era, which then covered a larger area of the lower Euphrates, was a rich source of grain. The peasants often paid tax in kind, in the form of barley, wheat and corn. In 1848 Najib Pasha triggered a rebellion that lasted two years by demanding excessive taxation. The government lost control of the countryside and its troops were confined to towns such as Karbala, Najaf and Hilla.

Writing of an 1849 expedition to explore the ruins of Ninevah and Babylon, Sir Austen Henry Layard reported that the large canal called the Hindiyah now led almost half the waters of the Euphrates into huge marshes west of Babylon. The Arabs had driven their buffaloes into the wetlands to escape the attention of the Turks. Abde Pasha was trying to dam the mouth of the canal and dry out the marshes. The current was washing away the earth and fascine barrier as fast as it could be built.

In the period from 1900 to 1908 most of the waters of the Euphrates shifted from the Hilla channel to the Hindiya, causing canals in the Hilla region to dry up and causing excessive flooding in the Hindiya region. The peasants were forced to move on a large scale, resulting in friction and conflicts. This was in part the motive for the Hindiya Barrage proposed by Sir William Willcocks to control the water system, completed in 1913. After World War I the British took over control of Iraq from Turkey. In 1920 there was an Iraqi revolt against the British. By July 1920 rebels were engaged with the British at Hindiya, Kufa and Rustamiya. Troops were sent from Hilla to Hindiya, and this caused the Beni Hassan tribes to rise in the Hilla District and seize the town of Kifl.

The town of Hindiya was the scene of a minor clash on 1 April 2003 during the Iraq War, when the US 3rd Infantry Division pushed past Republican Guards of the Nebuchadnezzar Division.

== Demographics ==
Karbala Governorate, Al-Hindiya in the east

As of 2007 Karbala governorate as whole was estimated to have 887,859 people in 2007, with equal numbers of men and women. Al-Hindiya District had about 26% of the governorate's population, or about 230,000 people. As of 2014 the population was mainly Shia, including many refugees from the violence in Baghdad and Diyala. About 8.3% of the population were post-2006 internally displaced people. 20% of Al-Hindiya District families were headed by women. Education levels, particularly among women, were low. 23% of residents over the age of 10 were illiterate. 8.1% suffered from chronic disease, and 3.1% of infants aged 0–5 years had suffered diarrhea in the last two weeks.

== Infrastructure ==
The Hindiya Barrage, crossing the Euphrates in the north of the district, was built by British engineers for the Turkish authorities just before World War I (1914–18). It reduced flooding and transferred water to canals to support irrigation throughout the year. The barrage diverted a large amount of water to the east of the river through the Hilla canal, and also diverted water into the Jarjiya canal to the east of the river and the Bani Hasan and Husainiya canals to the west. As of 1937 about 31.5% of the Euphrates water was diverted into these canals by the barrage, while the remainder continued down the Hindiya channel of the river. The Hilla Canal (Shatt-al-Hilla) flows south through the towns of Hindiya and Kifil, then bifurcates into smaller canals whose water is used for irrigation.

China State Construction Engineering undertook a project between October 1984 and April 1989 to replace the barrage and build a navigation lock, fish passage, bridges and a power station. It was one of China's largest foreign construction projects to date, at a cost of US$240 million. In September 2010 it was announced that about US$17.8 million had been set aside for development projects in the district in 2011. These included construction of roads, schools and a municipal building, power and telephone networks, sewage pumping stations and water network in several villages. 83.1% of households had a toilet by 2014, but 54% of households in the district had irregular access to drinking water.

== Sources ==
- Allan, Tony (2001-11-22). The Middle East Water Question: Hydropolitics and the Global Economy. I.B.Tauris. ISBN 978-0-85771-473-2.
- Bin Huwaidin, Mohamed Mousa Mohamed Ali (2003-09-02). China's Relations with Arabia and the Gulf 1949-1999. Routledge. ISBN 978-1-135-78689-2.
- Boesch, Hans H. (October 1939). "El-'Iraq". Economic Geography. 15 (4). Clark University: 325–361. doi:10.2307/141771. JSTOR 141771.
- Fattah, Hala (1997-06-05). The Politics of Regional Trade in Iraq, Arabia, and the Gulf, 1745-1900. SUNY Press. ISBN 978-0-7914-3114-6.
- Finger, Matthias; Tamiotti, Ludivine; Allouche, Jeremy (2012-02-01). The Multi-Governance of Water: Four Case Studies. SUNY Press. ISBN 978-0-7914-8251-3.
- Aswat al-Iraq (2010-09-22). "$18m Projects Approved in al-Hindiya District, Karbala". Iraq Business News.
- "Kerbala Governorate Profile". Joint Analysis and Policy Unit.;
- Layard, Sir Austen Henry (1853). Discoveries in the ruins of Nineveh and Babylon: with travels in Armenia, Kurdistan and the desert: being the result of a second expedition undertaken for the Trustees of the British Museum. G.P. Putnam and Co.
- "Map of Kerbala". Jauiraq.org. Archived from the original on 12 October 2014.
- Metz, Steven (2008). Iraq and the Evolution of American Strategy. Potomac Books, Inc. ISBN 978-1-61234-389-1.
- Naval Intelligence Division (2014-09-03). Iraq & The Persian Gulf. Taylor & Francis. ISBN 978-1-136-89273-8.
- Sanlaville, Paul (1989). "Considérations Sur l'Évolution de la Basse Mésopotamie Au Cours des Derniers Millénaires". Paléorient (in French). 15 (2). Paléorient and CNRS Editions: 5–27. doi:10.3406/paleo.1989.4506. JSTOR 41492359.
- Vinogradov, Amal (April 1972). "The 1920 Revolt in Iraq Reconsidered: The Role of Tribes in National Politics". International Journal of Middle East Studies Publication Info. 3 (2). Cambridge University Press: 123–139. doi:10.1017/S0020743800024843. JSTOR 162680.
