= Samuel C. Florman =

American author (1925–2024)

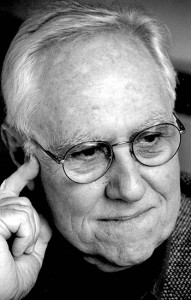
- Born: January 19, 1925; New York City, New York, U.S.
- Died: February 3, 2024 (aged 99); New York City, New York, U.S.
- Education: Dartmouth College, B.A., C.E. Columbia University, MA
- Occupations: Author, civil engineer
- Spouse: Judith Hadas (m. 1951)
- Children: 2 sons
- Writing career
- Genres: Non-fiction, fiction, Memoir
- Subjects: Engineering, Relationship between technology and the general culture
- Notable works: The Existential Pleasures of Engineering, and six other books
- Website: kbfgeneral.com

Samuel Charles Florman (January 19, 1925 – February 3, 2024) was an American civil engineer, general contractor and author. He is best known for his writings and speeches about engineering, technology and the general culture. The most widely distributed of his seven books is The Existential Pleasures of Engineering, published in 1976, second edition in 1994. According to one authority, "It has become an often-referred-to modern classic." His last published book was Good Guys, Wiseguys and Putting Up Buildings: A Life in Construction, published in 2012.

Florman was Chairman of Kreisler Borg Florman General Construction Company in Scarsdale, New York.

In 1995 he was elected to the National Academy of Engineering "For literary contributions furthering engineering professionalism, ethics and liberal engineering education."

== Early life, education and military service ==
Samuel C. Florman was born and raised in New York City where he attended the Ethical Culture Fieldston School. He entered Dartmouth College with the Class of 1946, which because of the outbreak of war, started studies in the summer of 1942. The following year he enlisted in the Navy V-12 program at Dartmouth, continued his studies while on active duty, and received the BS degree, summa cum laude in November 1944. He took graduate courses at Dartmouth's Thayer School of Engineering until February 1945 when he was sent to the Civil Engineer Corps officers training school in Davisville, Rhode Island. On May 5, 1945, he was commissioned as an ensign and assigned to a program of military training. For a year, starting in August 1945, he served with the 29th Construction Battalion (the Seabees) supervising construction work in the Philippines and Truk. Returning to civilian life in the fall of 1946 he entered graduate school at Columbia University and earned an MA degree in English Literature (June 3, 1947). He started work as a construction engineer in the summer of 1947 while taking graduate engineering courses at night at New York University. In subsequent years he earned his license to Practice Professional Engineering in the State of New York (October 17, 1957) and was awarded the fifth-year Civil Engineer degree by the Thayer School of Engineering at Dartmouth (April 14, 1973).

== Career ==
In 1948 after service in the Seabees and graduate studies at Columbia and N.Y.U., Florman worked as a field engineer for Hegeman-Harris Co. on a project in Venezuela. He then returned to the United States and worked as an office engineer for Thompson-Starrett Co., New York City, from 1949 to 1953. From 1954 to 1955 he was a project manager for Joseph P. Blitz, Inc., New York City. In 1956 he joined the newly formed Kreisler Borg Florman General Construction Co., Scarsdale and New York City. He was chairman at the time of his death.

== Personal life and death ==
Florman married Judith Hadas of Kansas City in 1951. They had their first son in 1954 followed by a second in 1958. The couple resided in New York City and Kent Lakes, Putnam County, New York. They had five granddaughters. Florman died in New York City on February 3, 2024, at the age of 99.

== Works ==
=== Books ===
- Engineering and the Liberal Arts (1968), McGraw-Hill Inc.
- The Existential Pleasures of Engineering (1976. Second Edition, 1994), St. Martin's Press.
- Blaming Technology: The Irrational Search for Scapegoats (1981), St. Martin's Press.
- The Civilized Engineer (1987), St. Martin's Press.
- The Introspective Engineer (1996), St. Martin's Press.
- The Aftermath: A Novel of Survival (2001), St. Martin's Press.
- Good Guys, Wiseguys, and Putting Up Buildings: A Life in Construction (2012), St. Martin's Press.

=== Articles ===
Florman has written more than 250 articles in professional journals, newspapers and magazines. His articles are seen in Harper's—for which he was a contributing editor from 1976 to 1981—and MIT's Technology Review, where he wrote a quarterly column from 1982 to 1998.

=== Papers, Presentations and Speeches ===
Florman has delivered papers and given speeches and presentations at many universities including Georgia Institute of Technology, Princeton, Yale and the U.S. Military Academy—as well as at many engineering conferences and the New York Academy of Science—since 1968.

== Professional Activities ==
Since being elected as a Fellow of American Society of Civil Engineers in 1965, Florman has served on many committees of the National Academy of Engineering and United States National Research Council, including the Committee on the Offshoring of Engineering, from 2006 to 2008.

== Awards and honors ==
Florman's numerous awards included the Ralph Coats Roe Medal, American Society of Mechanical Engineers, 1982, which "recognizes an outstanding contribution toward a better public understanding and appreciation of the engineer’s worth to contemporary society," and honorary doctorates from Manhattan College and Clarkson University.
