= John Aird & Co. =

Former British civil engineering business

- Company type: Private
- Industry: Construction
- Founded: 1848
- Defunct: 1990s
- Fate: Withdrew from Civil engineering
- Headquarters: London, UK
- Key people: Sir John Aird, Jnr, (Chairman)

John Aird & Co. was once a leading British civil engineering business based in London.

== Early history ==
The company was founded in 1848 by John Aird (1800–1876) with the objective of laying mains for gas and water companies in London.

In 1851 Aird was joined by his son, also called John, and the business was for a while known as John Aird & Sons. John Aird, Jnr was the real driver behind the business.

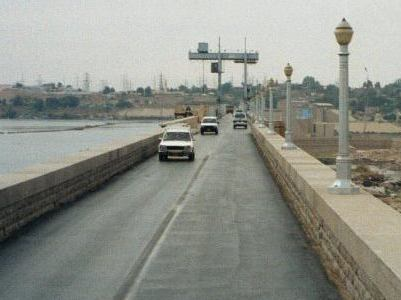
Aswan Low Dam built by John Aird & Co.

== Structure ==
After the company began collaborating with Lucas Brothers, their combined businesses were re-organised in 1870 as follows:

- Lucas Brothers - Building
- Lucas and Aird - Railway work and civil engineering
- John Aird & Sons - Water and gas contracts

In 1895, when Sir Charles Lucas died, the businesses were reorganised again:

- John Aird & Co. - Railway work and civil engineering
- Aird & Sons - Water and gas contracts

== Major projects ==
Major projects involving John Aird & Co. included:

- Re-locating Crystal Palace to Sydenham completed in 1851
- Millwall Dock completed in 1868
- Aswan Low Dam completed in 1902
- Assiut Barrage completed in 1903
- Hodbarrow Sea Defences completed in 1905

== Subsequent history ==
In 1908 Sir John Aird (1st Baronet) was largely incapacitated by a stroke and the business was managed by his two sons, Sir John Aird (2nd Baronet) and Malcolm Aird, who entered into a major contract with the Tanjong Pagar Dock Company to build a major extension of the Port of Singapore. The work progressed well at first but in 1910, a major problem arose constructing the East and West walls of the dock because the depth of silt and mud was too great for the method of construction specified by the Consulting Engineers. Work stopped and there followed one of the longest Civil Court Trials lasting 29 days in October to December 1912 and John Aird & Co were awarded £300,000 in compensation on the grounds that the dock design was not possible to build. At the end of the trial, the two Aird sons decided to close down the business.

In 1970, Sir John Aird, 4th Baronet revived the name for a while by forming Sir John Aird & Co as a construction and engineering business.
