= Lucas Brothers (company) =

British building business

Lucas Brothers, Builders
- Company type: Private
- Industry: Construction
- Founded: 1842
- Defunct: 1895
- Fate: Dissolved
- Headquarters: London, England
- Key people: Charles Lucas, (chairman)

Lucas Brothers was a leading British building business based in London.

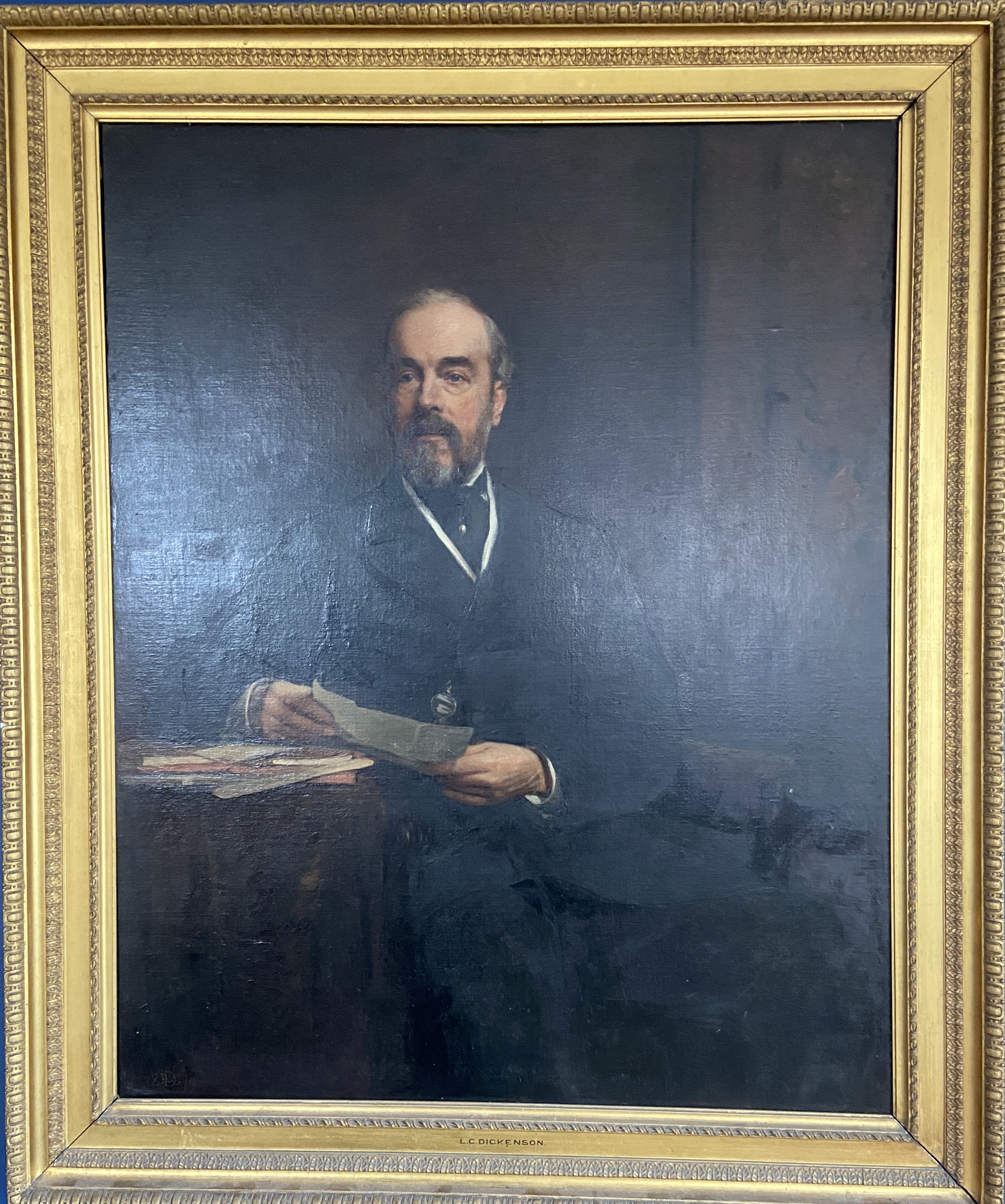
Sir Thomas Charles Lucas 1st Bart. of Ashtead Park and Lowestoft

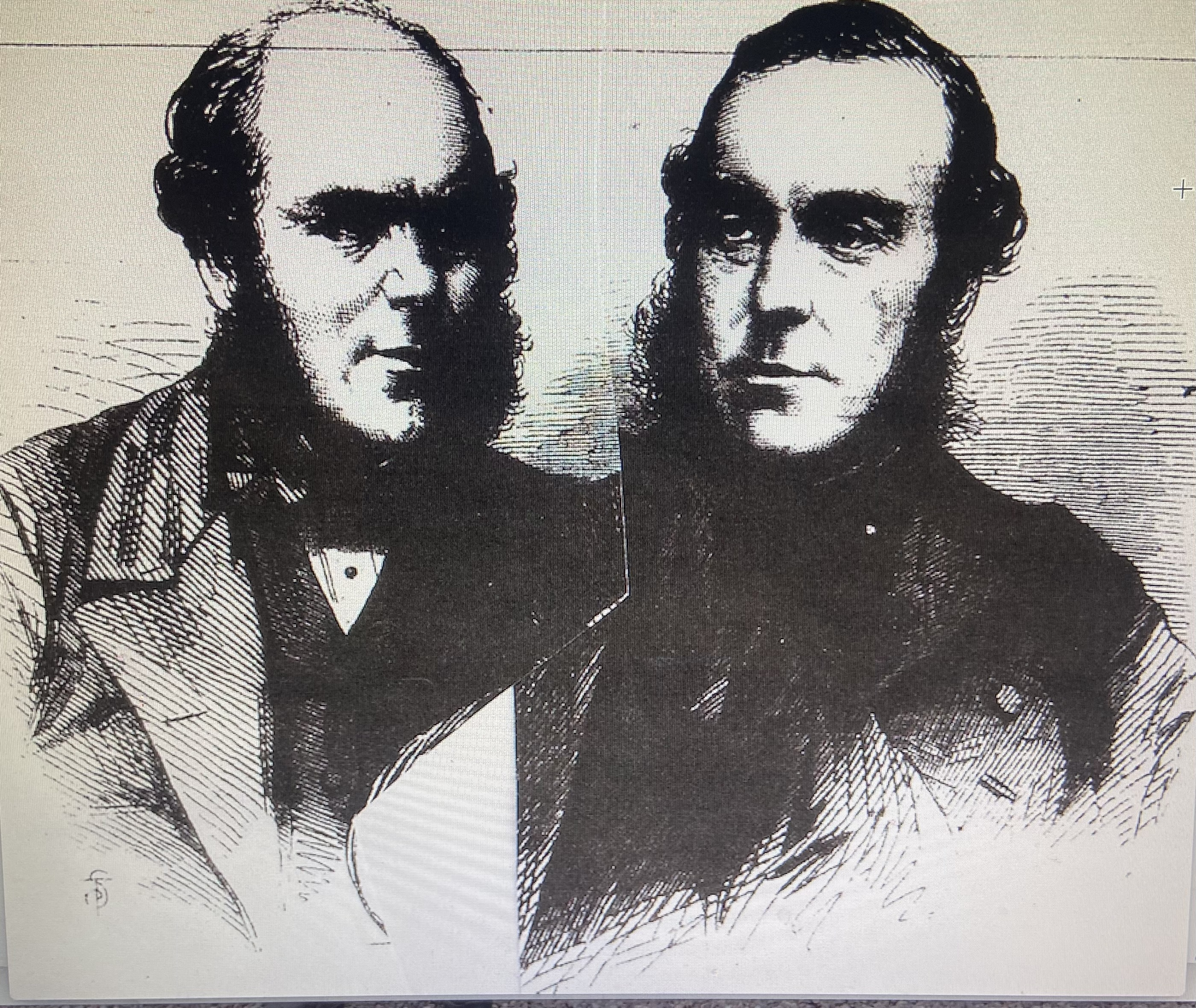
Sketch of Thomas and Charles Lucas, Circa. 1870

== Early history ==
The business was founded by Charles Thomas Lucas (1820 London – 1895 Warnham Court, near Horsham) and Thomas Lucas (1822–1902). They were the sons of James Lucas (1792–1865), a builder from St Pancras, London. Charles joined his father's business and was soon employed to manage construction of the Norwich and Brandon Railway for Sir Samuel Morton Peto.

In 1842 Charles set up his own contracting business in Norwich and progressed to rebuilding Peto's house, Somerleyton Hall. Charles and Thomas established a facility in Lowestoft from which they undertook various works, including the railway, the station, the Esplanade, Wellington Terrace, Kirkley Cliff Terrace, St John's church, and several hotels.

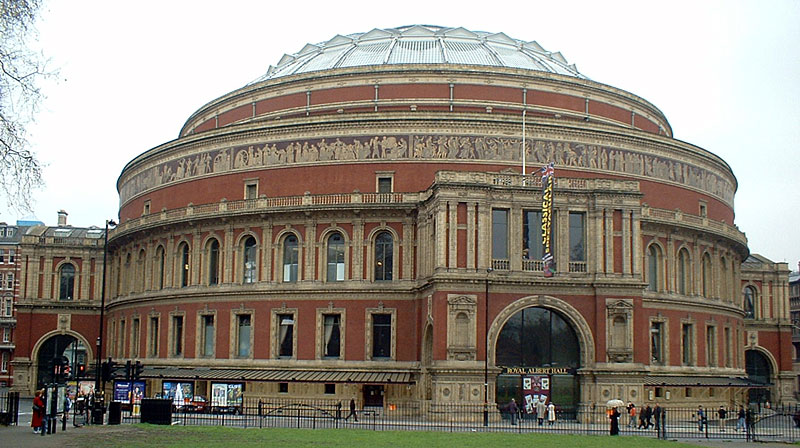
The Royal Albert Hall built by Lucas Brothers

== Building contracts ==
Building contracts included:

- Covent Garden Opera House (completed in 1858)
- Oxford University Museum of Natural History (1860)
- Floral Hall (1860)
- King's College Hospital (1862)
- Langham Hotel (1865)
- Charing Cross Hotel (1865)
- the Junior Carlton Club (1866)
- City Terminus Hotel (1867)
- Royal Albert Hall (1871)
- Charterhouse School (1872)
- Alexandra Palace (1873)
- Royal Station Hotel, York (1878)
- Great Eastern Hotel (1884)

Stations included:

- Lowestoft railway station (1855)
- Charing Cross railway station (1864)
- Cannon Street station (1866)
- Liverpool Street station (1874)
- York railway station (1877)

Private houses included:

- Cliveden (1851)
- Henham Hall (1858)
- Rendlesham Hall (1870)
- Normanhurst Court (1870)

Civil engineering works i.e. railways and bridges were undertaken from 1870 by the joint venture, Lucas and Aird.

Lucas Brothers also undertook the construction for the International Exhibition of 1862 and the South Kensington Exhibitions of 1867 and 1871 with Sir John Kelk.

== Structure ==
After the company began collaborating with John Aird & Co., their combined businesses were re-organised in 1870 as follows:

- Lucas Brothers – Building
- Lucas and Aird – Railway work and civil engineering
- John Aird & Sons – Water and gas contracts

In 1895, when Sir Charles Lucas died, Lucas Brothers and Lucas and Aird were dissolved.

== About the founders ==
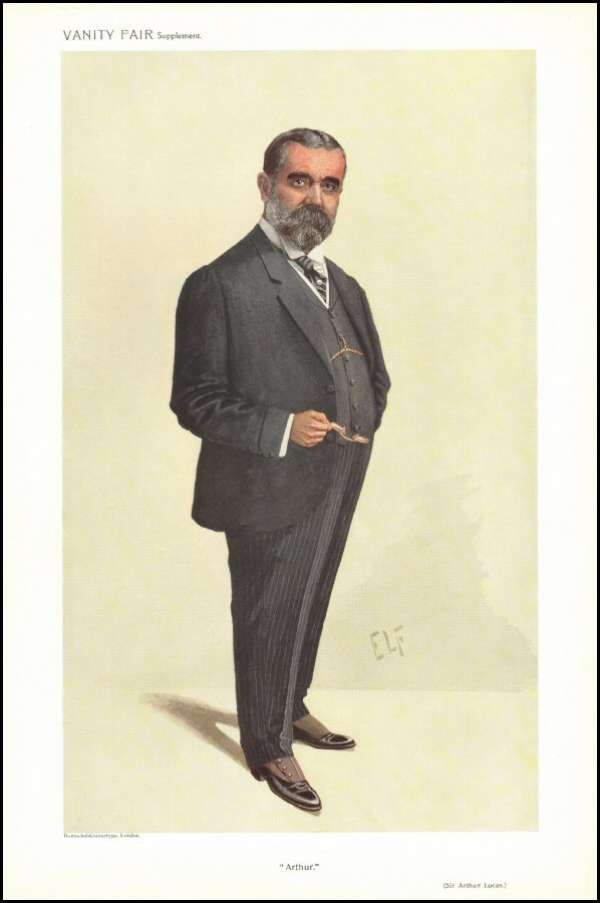
"Arthur". Caricature by Elf published in Vanity Fair in 1909.

Charles Thomas Lucas married Charlotte Tiffin and had five sons and two daughters. He lived in London and then at Warnham in Sussex. He was created a Baronet in 1887. Thomas Lucas married Jane Golder and had a daughter. After her death, he married Mary Amelia Chamberlin, daughter of Robert Chamberlin of Norwich, and had six sons and four daughters. He lived in London, Ascot, and briefly at Ashtead in Surrey.

Sir Thomas Charles Lucas was the first of the Lucas baronets, the present holder of the baronetcy is Sir Thomas Edward Gubbins Lucas 5th Bt.
