= William Willcocks =

British civil engineer

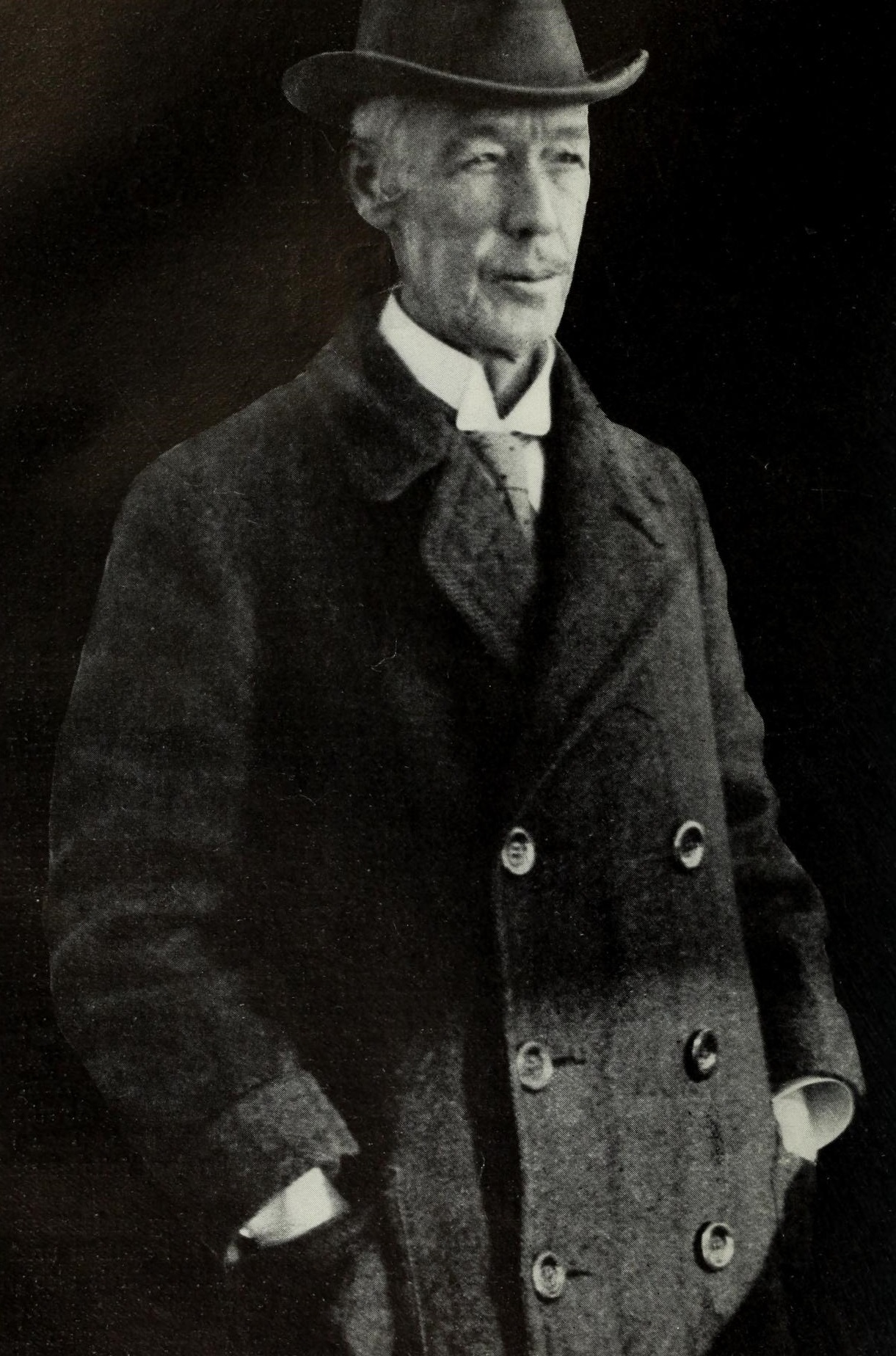
- William Willcocks
- Born: 27 September 1852; Landour, North-Western Provinces, British India
- Died: 28 July 1932 (aged 79); Cairo, Egypt
- Spouse: Susan Ann Scott Moncrieff
- Children: Mary Helena Willcocks, Maddeline Frances Willcocks, Alexander John Willcocks
- Parent(s): William and Mary Willcocks
- Engineering career
- Projects: Aswan Low Dam, Assiut Barrage, Hindiya Barrage

Sir William Willcocks KCMG (27 September 1852 in India – 28 July 1932 in Cairo, Egypt) was a British civil engineer during the high point of the British Empire. He was an irrigation engineer who proposed and built the first Aswan Dam, the scale of which had never been attempted previously. He later undertook other major irrigation projects in South Africa and the Ottoman Empire's Arabian territories.

== Biography ==
Willcocks was born and baptised in Landour, British India, one of four sons of a British Engineer posted in Roorkee for Ganges canal works. He graduated from the Indian Institute of Technology Roorkee in 1872, and joined the Indian Public Works Department the same year. A few years later he married Susan Ann Scott Moncrieff, daughter of Rev. John Edward Scott Moncrieff, in Meerut, India. Following the British invasion and occupation of Egypt, he began work with the long-established Egyptian Public Works Department in 1883. He was serving as director general of reservoirs for Egypt when he completed his studies and plans in 1896 to construct the Aswan Low Dam, the first true storage reservoir on the river. He supervised its construction from 1898 to its completion in 1902. He also designed and constructed another dam on the Nile, the Assiut Barrage, also completed in 1902. For his service to these projects he was appointed a Knight Commander of the Order of St Michael and St George (KCMG) in December 1902. He later became chairman of the Cairo Water Works Company, and was also president of the Anglo-Egyptian Land Allotments Company which was instrumental for the urbanization of Zamalek district (then known as Gezireh) early in the 20th century. One of the streets of Zamalek was named 'Willcocks' after him. He left his position in Egypt by 1897 and four years later he was invited to South Africa. With the end of the Anglo-Boer War he was asked to look into the possibility of irrigation projects in the Transvaal and Orange River Colony.

He later became head of irrigation for the Ottoman Turkish government, for what was then the greater area of Turkish Arabia. He drew up the first accurate maps of the region, which were subsequently a great help to British expeditionary forces in 1914 and again in 1915. In 1911 he proposed to have the water brought to the ancient area of Chaldea in Southern Mesopotamia. The Hindiya Barrage was consequently built on the River Euphrates near ancient Babylon being completed in 1914, bringing 3,500,000 acres (14,200 km^{2}) under irrigation and in so doing fashioned much of modern Iraq. At the time he mixed with Arabists such as Freya Stark, the intrepid traveller, and Sir Leonard Woolley, the archaeologist of Ur of the Chaldees and excavator of the ziggurat at Ur.

He later worked on irrigation projects in Romania shortly before the outbreak of World War I, and again as late as 1928 in Bengal, where he had received some his early training.

In Egypt he published a pamphlet critical of the Nile dams project and in so doing defamed the Under-Secretary of State for Public Works, Sir Murdoch MacDonald. He was asked to apologise but refused. In January 1921 he was put on trial before the Supreme Consular Court of Egypt on a charge of sedition and criminal libel, as under Ottoman-era orders libel could become a crime rather than a civil matter when it threatened to ‘disturb the peace’ – for instance, by undermining faith in public officials – and criminal libel prosecutions for this purpose were common in British colonies and protectorates. He was bound over for good behaviour for one year.

He died at the Anglo-American Hospital in Cairo.
