= Aswan Low Dam =

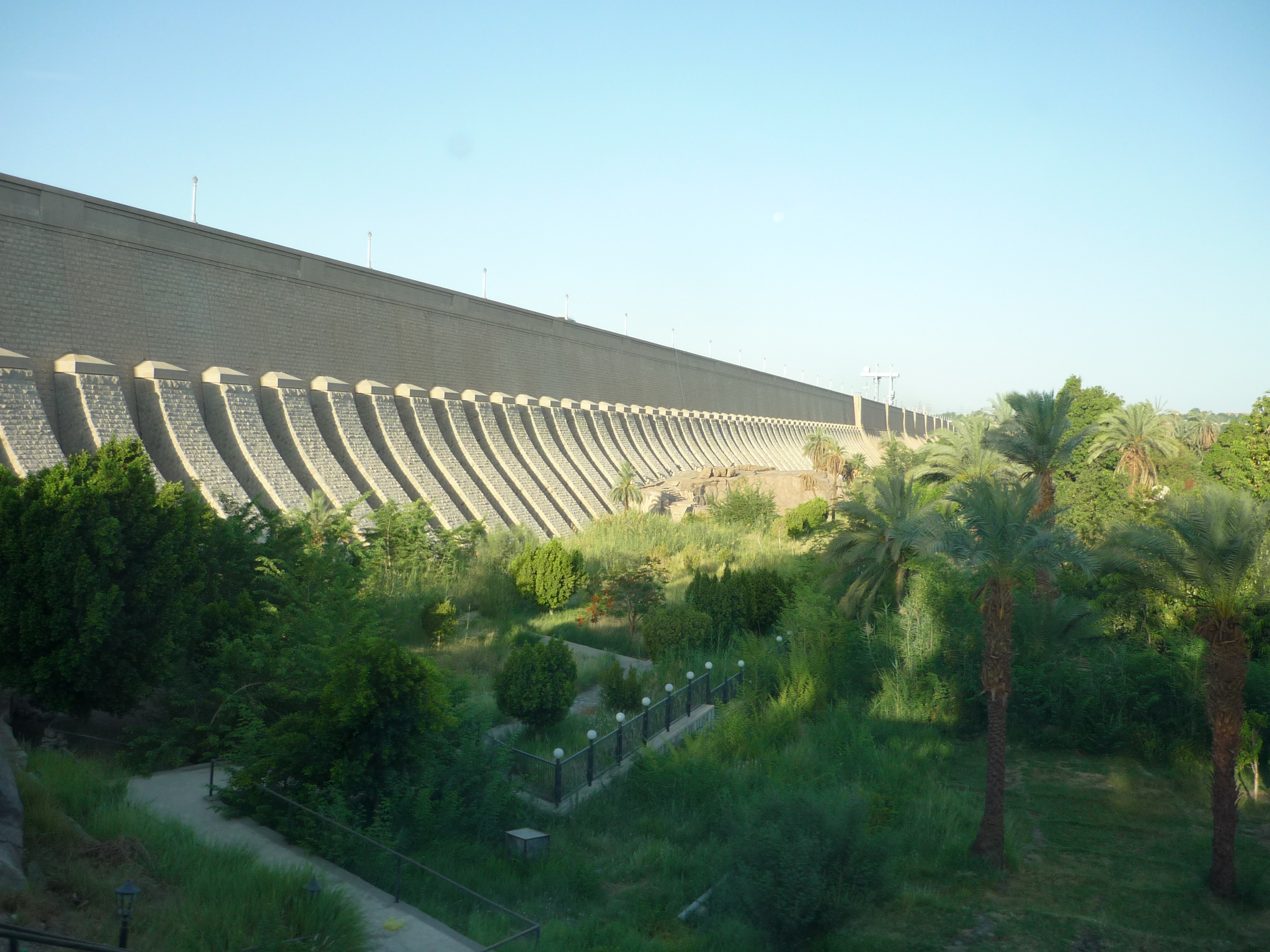
- Aswan Low Dam
- Interactive map of Aswan Low Dam
- Official name: Aswan Low Dam
- Location: Egypt
- Coordinates: 24°02′02″N 32°51′57″E
- Construction began: 1899
- Opening date: 1902
- Owner: Egypt
- Operator: Egypt

Dam and spillways
- Type of dam: Gravity, masonry buttress
- Impounds: River Nile
- Height: 36 m (118 ft)
- Length: 1,950 m (6,400 ft)
- Spillway type: Floodgates

Reservoir
- Creates: tailwater of Lake Nasser
- Total capacity: 5,300×10^{6} m^{3} (4,300,000 acre⋅ft)

Power Station
- Commission date: Aswan I: 1960; Aswan II: 1980–85
- Turbines: Aswan I: 7 × 40 MW (54,000 hp) Kaplan-type; Aswan II: 4 × 67.5 MW (90,500 hp) Kaplan-type
- Installed capacity: 592 MW (794,000 hp) (Aswan I, II)

The Aswan Low Dam or Old Aswan Dam is a gravity masonry buttress dam on the Nile River in Aswan, Egypt. The dam was built by the British at the former first cataract of the Nile, and is located about 1000 km up-river and 690 km (direct distance) south-southeast of Cairo. When initially constructed between 1899 and 1902, nothing of its scale had ever been attempted; on completion, it was the largest masonry dam in the world. The dam was designed to provide storage of annual floodwater and augment dry season flows to support greater irrigation development and population growth in the lower Nile. The dam, originally limited in height by conservation concerns, worked as designed, but provided inadequate storage capacity for planned development and was raised twice: between 1907 and 1912 and again between 1929 and 1933. These heightenings still did not meet irrigation demands and in 1946 it was nearly over-topped in an effort to maximize pool elevation. This led to the investigation and construction of the Aswan High Dam 6 kilometres (3.7 mi) upstream.

== Background ==
The earliest recorded attempt to build a dam near Aswan was in the 11th century, when the Arab polymath and engineer Ibn al-Haytham (known as Alhazen in the West) was summoned to Egypt by the Fatimid Caliph, Al-Hakim bi-Amr Allah, to regulate the flooding of the Nile. After his field work convinced him of the impracticality of this scheme, and fearing the Caliph's anger, he feigned madness. He was kept under house arrest from 1011 until al-Hakim's death in 1021, during which time he wrote his influential Book of Optics.

== Construction ==
Constructing the dam at Aswan was known to result in the flooding of Philae. Public Works Department engineers were instructed to go ahead with the project even if a different site could not be found. Following their 1882 victory of the Anglo-Egyptian War leading to the occupation of Egypt, the British began construction of the first dam across the Nile in 1898. Construction lasted until 1902, and it was opened on 10 December 1902, by Prince Arthur, Duke of Connaught and Strathearn. The project was designed by Sir William Willcocks and involved several eminent engineers of the time, including Sir Benjamin Baker and Sir John Aird, whose firm, John Aird & Co., was the main contractor. Capital and financing were furnished by Ernest Cassel.

The Old Aswan Dam was designed as a gravity-buttress dam; the buttress sections accommodate numerous gates, which were opened yearly to pass the flood and its nutrient-rich sediments, but without retaining any yearly storage. The dam was constructed of rubble masonry and faced with red ashlar granite. When constructed, the Old Aswan Dam was the largest masonry dam in the world. The design also included a navigation lock of similar construction on the western bank, which allowed shipping to pass upstream as far as the second cataract, whereas a portage overland was previously required. At the time of its construction, nothing of such scale had ever been attempted.

=== Heightening ===
Initial limitations were imposed on the dam's height, due to concern for the Philae Temple. The initial construction was found to be inadequate for development needs, and the height of the dam was raised in two phases: 5 metres (16 ft) between 1907 and 1912 and 9 metres (30 ft) between 1929 and 1933. Generation of electricity was added. The first phase was supervised by Sir Benjamin Baker, but much of the detailed work was undertaken by Murdoch MacDonald.

With its final raising (designed and supervised by MacDonald's firm, Sir M MacDonald & Partners), the dam is 1,950 metres (6,400 ft) in length, with a crest level 36 metres (118 ft) above the original riverbed; the dam provides the main route for traffic between the city and the airport. With the construction of the High Dam upstream, the Old Dam's ability to pass the flood's sediments was lost, as was the serviceability provided by the locks. The previous Old Dam reservoir level was also lowered and now provides control of tailwater for the High Dam.

== Power plants ==
The Aswan Low Dam supports two hydroelectric power plants, Aswan I (1960) and Aswan II (1985–1986). Aswan I contains 7 X 40 megawatts (54,000 hp) generators with Kaplan turbines for a combined capacity of 280 megawatts (380,000 hp) and is located west of the dam. Aswan II contains 4 x 67.5 megawatts (90,500 hp) generators for an installed capacity of 270 megawatts (360,000 hp) and is located at the toe of the dam.

== See also ==
- Energy in Egypt
