= Flooding of the Nile =

Natural phenomenon occurring in Egypt since ancient times

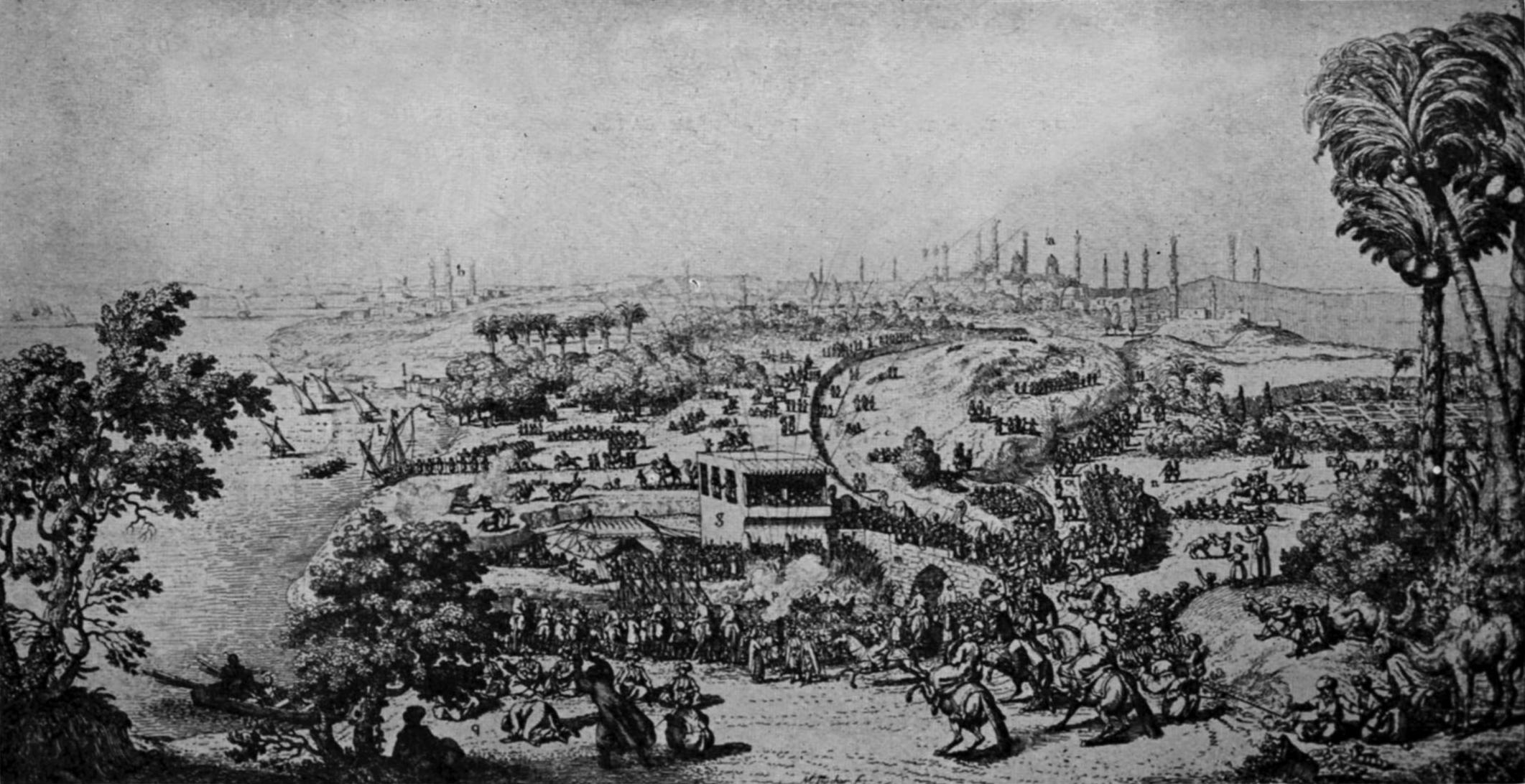
The festival of the Nile as depicted in Norden's Voyage d'Egypte et de Nubie

Map of the Nile river

The flooding of the Nile (commonly referred to as the Inundation) and its silt deposition was a natural cycle found in Ancient Egypt. It was very important in the history and culture of Ancient Egypt. In modern Egypt, governments began building flood management infrastructure during the 19th century. These efforts continued throughout the 20th century. In 1970, the annual flooding of the Nile ceased with the completion of the Aswan High Dam.

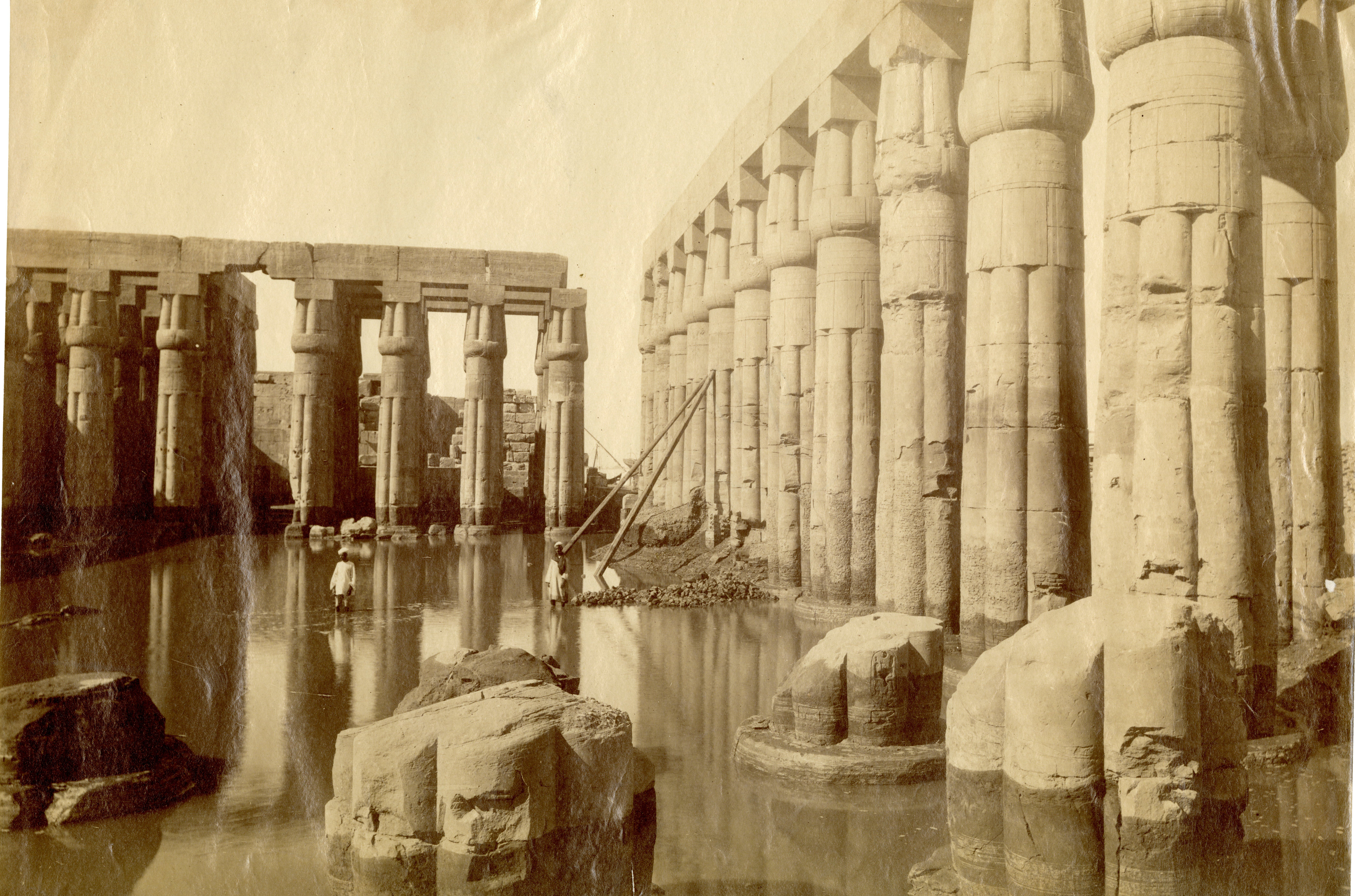
1870–1888 view of the ruins of the colonnade of the forecourt of Amenhotep III in the temple complex of Amun at Luxor, inundated during a flood of the Nile.

The river's predictability and annual deposits in the Nile Valley and Delta made for extraordinarily rich soil—classified today as alluvium on a bed of entisol— enabling the Egyptians to build an empire on the basis of its enormous agricultural wealth and surpluses of cereals which could be stored or traded. Egyptians were one of the first groups of people to practice agriculture on a large scale. This was only possible with their innovation of surface irrigation, also called "basin irrigation", which finally gave rise to the form of Ancient Egyptian agriculture that continued into the 20th century. Their farming practices allowed them to grow surpluses of both cereals—especially the staple crops wheat and barley—and industrial crops—such as flax for weaving into linen and Nile grass for manufacture into papyrus. By the time of Roman rule, Egypt was one of the most significant sources of wheat in the entire Roman Empire.

Egyptians have celebrated the flooding since at least early antiquity. Today the annual flooding is commemorated by a two-week holiday called Wafaa El-Nil, beginning on August 15. It is also celebrated in the Coptic Church by ceremonially throwing a martyr's relic into the river, giving it the name "The Martyr's Finger" (Coptic: ⲡⲓⲧⲏⲃ ⲛⲙⲁⲣⲧⲏⲣⲟⲥ, Arabic: Esbaʿ al-shahīd).

== Cultural significance in Ancient Egypt ==
The flooding of the Nile held a primary importance to the people of Ancient Egypt, reflected in their founding myths, their calendar, and in their very name for their land. In the Ancient Egyptian religion, the floodwaters were Isis's tears of sorrow for the murdered Osiris, killed by his own brother Set. During inundation festivals, Egyptians planted mud figures of Osiris with barley.

The Egyptian calendar year was divided into three seasons: Akhet (Inundation); Peret (Growth); and Shemu (Harvest). Akhet covered the Egyptian flood cycle. This cycle was so consistent that the Egyptians timed its onset using the heliacal rising of Sirius, the key event used to set their calendar.

The Egyptians' name for the Nile was Ar or Aur, meaning simply “black,” for the color of the sediments it carried and deposited as fertile black soils on the floodplains of the Nile Delta. The mud's black color is also the root of the Ancient Egyptian name for the country: 𓆎 𓅓 𓏏𓊖 (km.t) (commonly vocalised as Kemet; probably pronounced [kuːmat] in ancient Egyptian), literally: "black land." Kemet, with its fertile black soil, stood apart from the deshret (⟨dšṛt⟩), or "red land", of the surrounding Eastern and Western Deserts.

Hapi was the god of the Nile and its annual flooding, which was also called the Arrival of Hapi in addition to its proper seasonal name. Hapi, with the pharaoh, were said to control the flooding. His association with the fertilization of the soil also meant Hapi symbolised fertility itself.

Hapi, shown as an iconographic pair of genii symbolically tying together upper and lower Egypt

== Flooding cycle ==
The flooding of the Nile is an effect of the yearly monsoon between May and August, which entails peak rainfall on the Ethiopian Highlands, the summits of which reach heights of up to 4,550 m (14,930 ft). Most of this runoff flows into the Blue Nile and, by the Atbarah River, into the main Nile; a smaller amount flows through the Sobat and the White Nile into the Nile. During this short period, the Atbarah and Sobat contribute up to 90% of Nile's flow and most of its transported sediment. After the monsoon season, they dwindle to minor rivers.

For Ancient Egyptians, the flooding was foreseeable, although its exact dates and levels could be forecast only on a short-term basis by transmitting the Nilometer gauge readings at Aswan in Upper Egypt to the lower parts of the kingdom where the readings had to be correlated with the local conditions.

The first indications of the rise of the river in Akhet could be seen at the first of the cataracts of the Nile at Aswan as early as the beginning of June according to the modern calendar, and a steady increase went on until the middle of July when the rate of increase usually peaked. The Nile continued to rise until the beginning of September, when the level remained constant for a period of about three weeks, sometimes fewer. In October, it often rose again and reached its highest level. From peak level, it began to subside and usually sank steadily until June, when it reached its lowest level again. Flooding reached Aswan about a week earlier than modern Cairo, and Luxor five to six days earlier than Cairo. Typical heights of flood were 45 feet (14 metres) at Aswan, 38 feet (12 metres) at Luxor (and Thebes) and 25 feet (7.6 metres) at Cairo.

== Agriculture ==
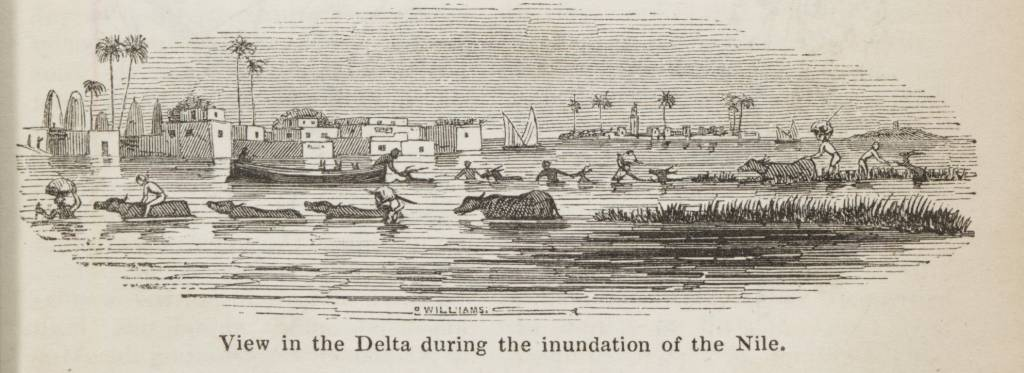
View in the Delta during the inundation of the Nile, 1847

=== Basin irrigation ===
Whilst the earliest Egyptians simply laboured those areas which were inundated by the floods, some 7000 years ago, they started to develop the basin irrigation method. Agricultural land was divided into large fields surrounded by dams and levees and equipped with intake and exit canals. The basins were flooded and then closed for about 45 days to saturate the soil with moisture and allow the silt to deposit. Then the water was discharged to lower fields or back into the Nile. Immediately thereafter, sowing started, and harvesting followed some three or four months later. In the dry season thereafter, farming was not possible. Thus, all crops had to fit into this tight scheme of irrigation and timing.

In case of a small flood, the upper basins could not be filled with water which could mean food shortages or famine. If a flood was too large, it would damage villages, dykes and canals.

The basin irrigation method did not over-extract nutrients from the soils, and the soils' fertility was sustained by the annual silt deposit. Salinisation did not occur, since, in summer, the groundwater level was well below the surface, and any salinity which might have accrued was washed away by the next flood.

It is estimated that by this method, in ancient Egypt, some 2 million up to a maximum of 12 million inhabitants could be nourished. By the end of Late Antiquity, the methods and infrastructure slowly decayed, and the population diminished accordingly; by 1800, Egypt had some 2.5 million inhabitants.

=== Perennial irrigation ===
Muhammad Ali Pasha, Khedive of Egypt (r. 1805–1848), attempted to modernize various aspects of Egypt. He endeavoured to extend arable land and achieve additional revenue by introducing cotton cultivation, a crop with a longer growing season and requiring sufficient water at all times. To this end, the Delta Barrages and wide systems of new canals were built, changing the irrigation system from the traditional basin irrigation to perennial irrigation whereby farmland could be irrigated throughout the year. Thereby, many crops could be harvested twice or even three times a year and agricultural output was increased dramatically. In 1873, Isma'il Pasha commissioned the construction of the Ibrahimiya Canal, thereby greatly extending perennial irrigation.

== End of flooding ==
The British, during their first period in Egypt, attempted to improve and expand the Egyptians' basin irrigation system, however the new infrastructure was not sufficiently capacious to fully retain the annual flooding. To remedy this, William Willcocks, in his role as director general of reservoirs for British Egypt, planned and supervised the construction of the Aswan Low Dam, the first true storage reservoir, and the Assiut Barrage, both completed in 1902. However, they were still not able to retain sufficient water to cope with the driest summers, despite the Aswan Low Dam being raised twice, in 1907–1912 and in 1929–1933.

During the 1920s, the British built the Sennar Dam on the Blue Nile to supply water to the massive Gezira Scheme on a regular basis from its reservoir. It was the first dam on the Nile to retain large amounts of sedimentation (and to divert a large quantity of it into the irrigation canals) and, despite opening its sluice gates during flooding to flush its sediments, the reservoir is assumed to have lost about a third of its storage capacity. In 1966, the Roseires Dam was added to help irrigating the Gezira Scheme. The Jebel Aulia Dam on the White Nile south of Khartoum was completed in 1937 in order to compensate for the Blue Nile's low waters in winter, but it was still not possible to overcome a period of very low waters in the Nile and thus avoid occasional drought, which had plagued Egypt since ancient times.

To overcome these problems, Harold Edwin Hurst, a British hydrologist in the Egyptian Public Works, studied the fluctuations of the water levels in the Nile, and in 1946 submitted a complex "century storage" plan to cope with exceptionally dry seasons occurring statistically once in 100 years. His ideas of constructing new reservoirs using Lake Victoria, Lake Albert and Lake Tana, and of reducing the evaporation in the Sudd by digging the Jonglei Canal, were opposed by the states concerned.

Eventually, Gamal Abdel Nasser, President of Egypt from 1956 to 1970, opted for the idea of the Aswan High Dam at Aswan in Egypt instead of attempting to coordinate internationally with upriver states. The required size of the reservoir was calculated by Hurst's figures and mathematical methods. In 1970, with the completion of the Aswan High Dam and filling of Lake Nasser—which was able to contain even the highest of high water—the annual flooding cycle in Egypt came to an end.

== See also ==
- Nilometer
- Egyptian Public Works
- Aswan Dam#Irrigation scheme
- Water supply and sanitation in Egypt
- Water resources management in modern Egypt
- The National Water Research Center (Egypt)
