= Alexandria Water Company =

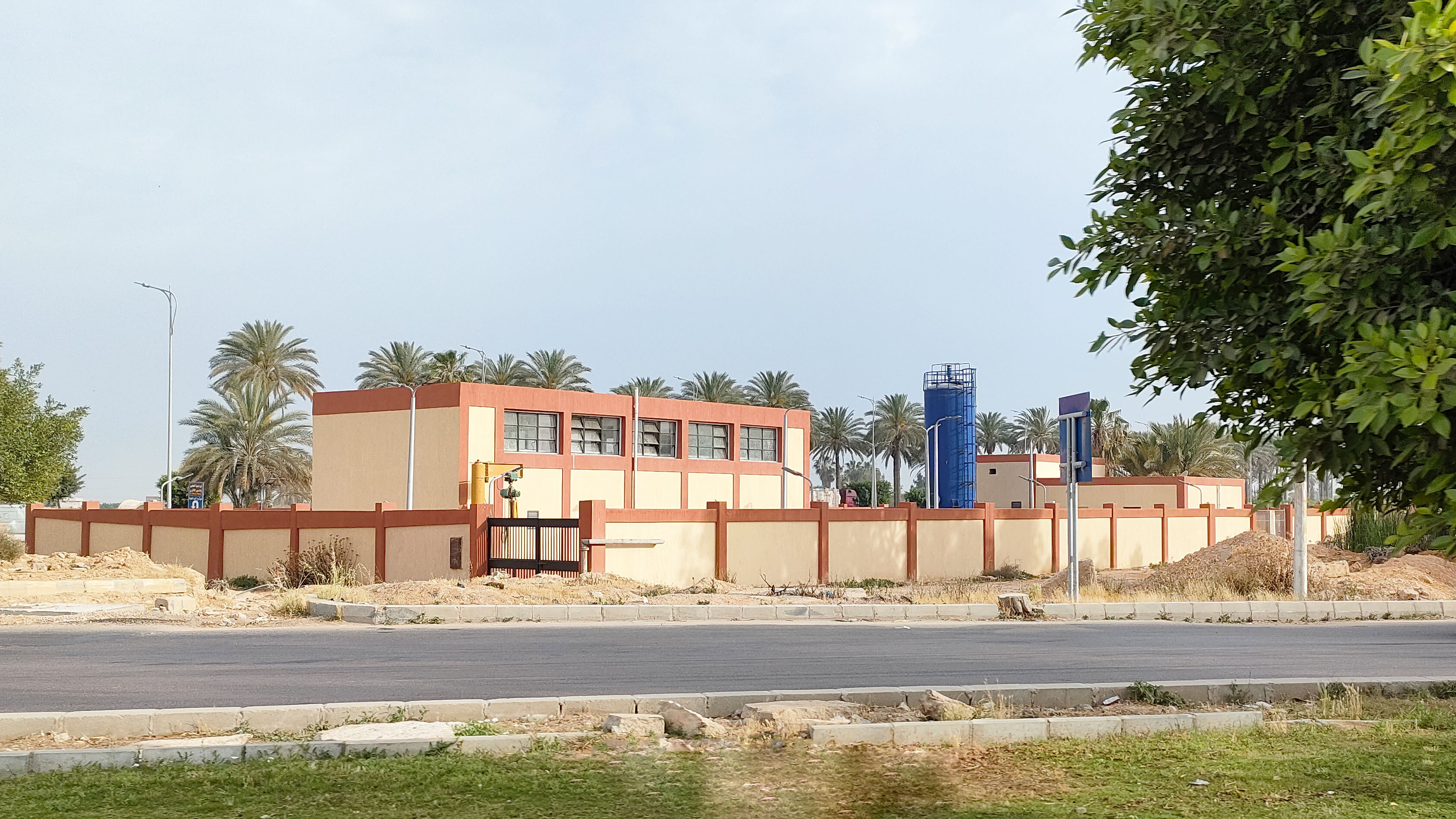
- New Borg El Arab city Pumping station
- Type: State-owned enterprise
- Industry: Water treatment
- Founded: 2004; 22 years ago
- Headquarters: Alexandria, Egypt
- Area served: Alexandria Governorate
- Key people: Ahmed Gaber (CEO)
- Owner: Holding Company for water and waste water

The Alexandria Water Company (AWCO) is the water company of the city and the governorate (province) of Alexandria, Egypt. It was founded in 1860 as a private company and it operated as such for more than 100 years before it was nationalized under the rule of Gamal Abdel Nasser. At that time it became the Alexandria Water General Authority (AWGA), a department of Alexandria Governorate in charge of both water supply and sewerage. In 2004, through a country-wide sector reform it became a commercially oriented company under private law. The sewerage and wastewater treatment functions were transferred to a separate company, the Alexandria General Organization for Sanitary Drainage (AGOSD), later renamed to Alexandria Sanitary and Drainage Company (ASDCO). The water utility became a company under private law, reverted to its old name AWCO and gained some operational independence. Both AWCO and ASDCO are part of the government-owned Holding Company for Water and Wastewater, which owns all utilities in Egypt. AWCO serves 4.5 million inhabitants, a number that increases to 6 million during the summer season. The Alexandria water utility is one of the better-performing water service providers in Egypt, ranked fifth among 22 water utilities by the Egyptian Water Regulatory Authority in 2012/13.

== Water resources ==
The city of Alexandria receives its water from the Nile River through the Mahmoudiyah Canal and the "Drinking Water Canal" that branches off from the Mahoudiyah Canal. Six water treatment plants draw their raw water from these two canals. The Noubaria Canal brings Nile water to the settlements in the western part of the Governorate. Two more water treatment plants are located on the Noubaria Canal. Because Alexandria is located downstream on the Nile, raw water quality is degraded, including by silt, weeds and debris. The salinity of the water is also elevated at around 600 parts per million. The water undergoes extensive treatment so that it complies with Egyptian drinking water quality standards. Each water treatment plant has its own laboratory that regularly monitors the quality of the treated water. In addition, there is a Central Laboratory that has been certified according to the ISO 17025:2005 standard. Water samples are taken on a weekly basis from the distribution network and showed a 98.4% compliance with standards in 2010–11.

== Corporate governance and role of women ==
As of 2005, all eight members of AWCO's Board of Directors, including its chairperson, Nadia Abdou, were women, making it one of the few utilities in the Arab world run by women. The board of directors consists of five members who are AWCO staff, including its chairperson, as well as four external board members. Two external board members are appointed by the Governorate of Alexandria and two by the Holding Company for Water and Wastewater that owns AWCO and to which its board of directors reports. AWCO is free to use its operating budget in any way it wants. However, investment plans and any internal restructuring have to be approved by the Holding Company. Increases of residential tariffs are infrequent. They have to be approved by the holding company, the national water regulatory agency EWRA, the Ministry of Housing, the Cabinet of Ministers, the President of the Republic and the National Assembly. Industrial tariffs can be set by the company.

== Evolution of performance ==
Between 2000 and 2004 the utility underwent a process of capacity development that manifested itself in the improvement of a number of performance indicators. For example, the utility introduced employee incentives. Field inspectors received five Egyptian pounds (about US$0.80) for each illegal connection they discovered. Also, meter readers and collectors received an incentive equal to up to 30% of their salary for exceeding monthly targets. Furthermore, water quality monitoring was improved and internal performance benchmarking as well as a financial forecasting tool were introduced. The utility increased its compliance with Egyptian drinking water standards from 90% to 100%; customer satisfaction improved from 60% to 82%; non-revenue water was reduced from 38% to 30% and bill collection efficiency increased from 59% to 81%. Technical assistance provided by various donors (USAID, GTZ and the Netherlands) helped in bringing about these improvements. It is not clear to what extent these improvements were sustained over time. According to one study, collection efficiency declined again to 65-70% in 2008.

== Tariffs and cost recovery ==
In 2004 AWCO was the only water utility in Egypt generating revenue sufficient to cover all operation and maintenance costs and debt service. The ratio of revenues to operating costs was 150% in that year. This was achieved although residential water tariffs in Egypt are among the lowest in the Middle East and North Africa: In 2012, for the first 10 m3 per month the residential water tariff was only Egyptian Pound 0.23/m3 (US$0.04) and for the second block until 30m3 it was Egyptian Pound 0.31/m3 (US$0.05), and for the third block until 45m3 it was EP 0.41/m3 (US$0.06). Unmeterd residential tariffs vary between 3.50 and 6.80 Pound per month depending on the number of rooms of the apartment or house. Non-residential metered tariffs vary between 0.60 and 2.30 Pound per cubic meter. They thus are up to ten times higher than the lowest block of the residential tariff. The highest tariff categories apply to private schools and universities and to large industries. Average water consumption is around 300 liter/capita/day (45m3 per month for a family of five). It is thus higher than in other countries in the region or in Europe, which has a favorable impact on revenues. Sanitation tariffs are a surcharge of 35% to the water bill. Revenues for sanitation are passed on to the Alexandria Drainage Company after deduction of a service fee. ASDCO does not recover its operating costs.

== Wastewater treatment and discharge ==
Until the 1980s domestic and industrial sewage from Alexandria were discharged without treatment into the Mediterranean Sea, where it caused pollution of beaches and degradation of aquatic life. Therefore, the local authorities decided to treat wastewater and discharge it into Lake Mariout, an important fishing ground and recreational area. The discharge of domestic and industrial wastewater, as well as nutrient-rich agricultural drainage, caused the degradation of the lake's water quality and its biodiversity. Ten wastewater treatment plants are operated by ASDCO. Their total capacity is 1.4 million m3 per day. The two main plants with a combined capacity of about 1 million m3 per day provide only primary treatment. Only one third of wastewater samples were in compliance with regulations in 2007.

== Challenges and perspectives ==
The city of Alexandria faces several environmental challenges. One is the expected long-term rise in the level that threatens to gradually inundate the city. The Intergovernmental Panel on Climate Change (IPCC) expects the sea level to rise by up to 59 cm in the worst of all considered scenarios by 2100. A 0.5-m rise in sea level would lead to estimated losses of land, installations, and tourism of more than US$32.5 billion in the Governorate of Alexandria alone, cutting off the city of Alexandria from the Delta. Another challenge is a possible decrease in the flow of the Nile, which will particularly hurt Alexandria as it is the furthest downstream on the river. Such a decrease could be caused by global warming or by increased water use from upstream countries. One option for Alexandria to respond to the latter challenges is to embark on seawater desalination, which is energy-intensive and thus not only expensive, but would further contribute to greenhouse gas emissions. Under an EU-funded research project called SWITCH, a plan for Integrated Urban Water Management has been developed. It has assessed “how Alexandria can meet a large part of its future water demand locally without depending mainly on Nile Waters”. According to the plan rainwater harvesting, stormwater usage, water reuse and water demand management could help in reaching that goal.

== See also ==
- Water supply and sanitation in Egypt
- Water resources management in modern Egypt
