= Research Institute for Groundwater =

The Research Institute for Groundwater (RIGW) is one of the most important organizations in Egypt specialized in development & Water Management of groundwater policy. The policy indicates the water allocation in space and time from water resources to users. Assessment of groundwater potential for the various users is made by RIGW, based on available information which is updated periodically according to the availability of the information.

RIGW has the principal responsibility within the National Water Research Center to formulate and conduct applied research programs responsive to the national requirements to support integrated development and management of groundwater resources in Egypt. To accomplish this mission RIGW activities is encompass:

- Exploratory research and appraisals describing the occurrences and characteristics of groundwater resources.
- Systematic data collection and analyses to monitor the state quantity, quality and use of groundwater resources.
- Basic and problem-oriented research to assess the potential of groundwater system and its response to natural and man-made stress.
- Studies that aid in providing solutions and alleviating problems related to groundwater system.
- Scientific and technical assistance in groundwater related fields to other state and private agencies.

To fulfill this mission, RIGW has to participate in the initiation of management and legislation system for the protection of groundwater from degradation and the control of the environmental impacts that may accompany groundwater development.

The role of RIGW at present is focused on its effective contribution to the planning and implementation of the national water policy and the development of Egypt's water resources.

Direct beneficiaries are the MWRI and its departments. Other clients include:

1. National institutions
2. Donor agencies
3. Agriculture societies
4. Water Companies
5. Individual investors.

== Organization ==
To fulfill the institute mission, the organization structure has been modified to reflect the activities and facilitate the execution of research and other programs.
