= New Delta Wastewater Treatment Plant =

Wastewater treatment plant in El Dabaa, Matrouh, Egypt

- محطة الدلتا الجديدة لمعالجة المياه
- Interactive map of the New Delta Wastewater Treatment Plant area

General information
- Type: wastewater treatment plant
- Location: El Dabaa, Matrouh, Egypt
- Coordinates: 30°22′39″N 29°36′27″E
- Completed: June 2023
- Cost: US$522 million

Technical details
- Grounds: 32 hecatres

Design and construction
- Architecture firm: Elnabarawy Consulting

The New Delta Wastewater Treatment Plant (Arabic: محطة الدلتا الجديدة لمعالجة المياه) is a wastewater treatment plant in El Dabaa, Matrouh Governorate, Egypt. It is the world's largest wastewater treatment plant.

== History ==
The construction of the plant was completed in June 2023. The construction lasted for 24 months.

== Architecture ==
The plant was designed by Elnabarawy Consulting architectural firm. The plant spans over an area of 32 hectares.

== Technical specifications ==
The plant has a water processing capacity of 7.5 million m^{3} per day. It is the world's largest wastewater treatment plant.

== Finance ==
The plant was constructed at a cost of US$522 million.

== See also ==
- Water supply and sanitation in Egypt
- List of largest wastewater treatment plants
