= List of largest wastewater treatment plants =

The largest wastewater treatment plants can be defined in several ways.

The largest in term of capacity, both during dry and wet-weathers, is the Jean-R.-Marcotte Wastewater Treatment Plant in Montreal. With full secondary treatment of effluents it would be the Deer Island Waste Water Treatment Plant of Boston. In terms of area occupied it is by far Melbourne's Western Treatment Plant.

Plant name	City	Country	Opening Year	Dry-weather capacity (m³ per day)	Wet-weather capacity (m³ per day)	Area (km^{2})	Notes
New Delta Wastewater Treatment Plant	El Dabaa	Egypt	2023	7 500 000		0.32	Holds four Guinness World Records.
Bahr El-Baqar Wastewater Treatment Plant	Port Said	Egypt	2021	5 600 000		0.65	
Jean-R.-Marcotte Wastewater Treatment Plant	Montreal	Canada	1984	2 780 000	7 600 000	0.67	Secondary treatment planned for 2028.
Detroit Wastewater Treatment Plant	Detroit	USA	1940	2 460 000	6 435 000	0.53	Wet-weather secondary treatment capacity limited to 3 520 000 m³/day.
Passaic Valley Sewerage Commission	Newark	USA	1902	1 320 000	2 700 000		Full secondary treatment since 1982.
Stickney Water Reclamation Plant	Chicago	USA	1930	2 665 000	5 450 000	1.67	
Blue Plains Advanced Wastewater Treatment Plant	Washington D.C.	USA	1937	1 450 000	4 073 000	0.62	Secondary treatment since 1959. Enhanced nutrient removal in 2014.
Deer Island Waste Water Treatment Plant	Boston	USA	1968	1 438 000	4 542 000	0.6	Full secondary treatment since 1995.
Abu Rawash Wastewater treatment plant	Giza	Egypt	2021	1 600 000		1.39	Secondary treatment since 2021.
Atotonilco de Tula Plant	Mexico City	Mexico	2015	2 000 000	3 000 000		
Hyperion Water Reclamation Plant	Los Angeles	USA	1925	1 041 000	3 000 000	0.81	Wet-weather secondary treatment (since 1950) capacity limited to 1 821 000 m³/day.
Kuryanovo wastewater treatment facilities	Moscow	Russia	1950	2 200 000			
Lyuberetskiye wastewater treatment facilities	Moscow	Russia	1963	3 000 000			
Seine Aval Wastewater Treatment Plant	Paris	France	1940	1 460 000	2 900 000	8	
Shanghai Zhuyan I Wastewater Treatment Plant	Shanghai	China	2004	1 700 000			
Stonecutters Island Sewage Treatment	Hong Kong	China	2001		2 765 000		
Bailonggang Wastewater Treatment Plant	Shanghai	China	1999	2 000 000			
Gabal el Asfar Wastewater Treatment Plant	Cairo	Egypt		1 700 000	2 500 000	1.63	
Beckton Sewage Treatment Works	London	UK	1864		2 330 000	1	
Morigasaki Water Reclamation Center	Tokyo	Japan	1966		1 540 000	0.41	
Vienna wastewater treatment plant	Vienna	Austria	2005	680 000	1 500 000	0.39	
ETE Barueri	Barueri	Brazil	1988		1 382 400	0.86	
Beijing Huaifang Water Plant	Beijing	China	2017	600 000		0.16	Built underground.
Crossness Sewage Treatment Works	London	UK	1859		564 000	0.7	Home to Sir Joseph Bazelgette beam engine house, victorian engineering.(beam engine trust), The engine was started by HRH The Prince of Wales, Albert Edward, who subsequently became King Edward VII. https://crossness.org.uk/
Western Treatment Plant	Melbourne	Australia	1897	485 000		105	
Jebel Ali Wastewater Treatment Plant	Dubai	UAE	2019	375 000		6.7	
Dasherkandi Sewage Treatment Plant	Dhaka	Bangladesh	2023	350 000	500 000	0.26	Largest sewage treatment plan in South Asia.
McAlpine Creek Wastewater Treatment Plant	Charlotte, N.C.	USA	1966	290 950			

Wastewater treatment capacities are expressed in cubic meters per day. 1000 cubic meters is 1 ML (mega liter). The area occupied by the plants are in square kilometers.

== See also ==
- Water pollution
- Sewage treatment
- History of water supply and sanitation
