= Huaifang Water Reclamation Plant =

Wastewater recycling plant in Beijing, China

Huaifang Water Reclamation Plant is a wastewater recycling plant located in the southwest of Beijing, China. Commissioned in 2017, the 3-floor plant spanned over an area of 162,000 m^{2} was built in response to the state capital of Beijing, facing a water shortage challenge exacerbated by climate change and urbanization with having the major water treatment systems being installed underground to save valuable land. The water treatment project is said to have been equipped with the forefront technologies.

Owned and operated by Beijing Drainage Group; Huaifang Water Reclamation Plant is the largest underground MBR-based wastewater treatment plant in Asia, with its construction being finished by December 2016 in association with the facility upgradation, executed by Suez in the year 2015.

== Operation ==
The plant is aimed towards maximizing the treatment capability of sludge and wastewater, the quality of treated water and improving flood control by holding a capacity to recycle 200 million m^{3}of wastewater per year.

Wastewater flowing into the facility is treated in several ways, including filtration, biological oxidation of chemicals and sterilization with ultraviolet rays. The Huaifang sludge line is fitted with pre-dewatering centrifuges, thermal hydrolysis CambiTHPTM, sludge silos, dewatering chamber filter presses & anaerobic digesters. A design capacity is 180 tDS/d, while the treatment of Lugouqiao (100,000 m^{3}/d) & Wujiacun (80,000 m^{3}/d) sludge is applied. The water treatment plant processes and turns the industrial and residential wasted water into water that meets environmental quality requirements; reclaimed water is then used in surrounding areas, for industrial and commercial uses as well as to replenish the nearby wetlands. According to the report by Xinhua, around 500,000 tons of reclaimed water per day is supplied to the 638,000 square meters of water wetland park, situated by the plant. Before moving towards the river, the reclaimed water flows into the wetland through underground pipes, further enhancing the local ecosystem.
