= Water supply and sanitation in Egypt =

The water supply and sanitation in Egypt is shaped by both significant achievements and persistent challenges. The country is heavily reliant on the Nile River, which provides 90% of its total water resources, amounting to 55 billion cubic meters annually, a figure unchanged since 1954. However, national water demand exceeds 90 billion cubic meters, creating a chronic water deficit. As a result, per capita water availability declined to 570 cubic meters in 2018, well below the 1,000 cubic meter water scarcity threshold. In response, Egypt has prioritized water conservation and wastewater treatment infrastructure to optimize limited resources while addressing rising consumption from population growth and agricultural expansion. Despite Egypt has made improvements in developing and improving its sanitation services and water infrastructure, Egypt still faces significant water shortages due to population growth, rising water demand, and substantial reliance on the Nile River.

Between 1990 and 2010, Egypt significantly expanded access to piped water, increasing urban coverage from 89% to 100% and rural coverage from 39% to 93%, while also eliminating open defecation in rural areas. By 2019, 96.9% of the population had access to safely managed drinking water, while proper sanitation coverage rose from 50% in 2015 to 66.2% in 2019, and the share of treated wastewater reached 74% by 2022.

Institutional reforms have shaped Egypt’s water and sanitation sector, with the Holding Company for Water and Wastewater (HCWW) created in 2004 and the Egyptian Water Regulatory Agency (EWRA) established in 2006 to oversee service provision and regulatory enforcement. While 98% of Egyptians now have access to at least basic water sources, challenges persist. Only half of the population is connected to sanitary sewers, and low cost recovery due to some of the world’s lowest water tariffs requires substantial government subsidies. These financial constraints, exacerbated by post-2011 salary increases without corresponding tariff adjustments, have hindered infrastructure expansion. Additionally, poor operation of facilities, limited government accountability, and low transparency further strain the sector.

Foreign assistance remains crucial, with the United States, European Union, France, Germany, the World Bank, and other international donors providing both financing and technical expertise. While sector reforms have aimed at improving cost recovery and service efficiency, private sector involvement has remained limited, primarily confined to Build-Operate-Transfer (BOT) projects for treatment plants.

== Water resources in Egypt ==
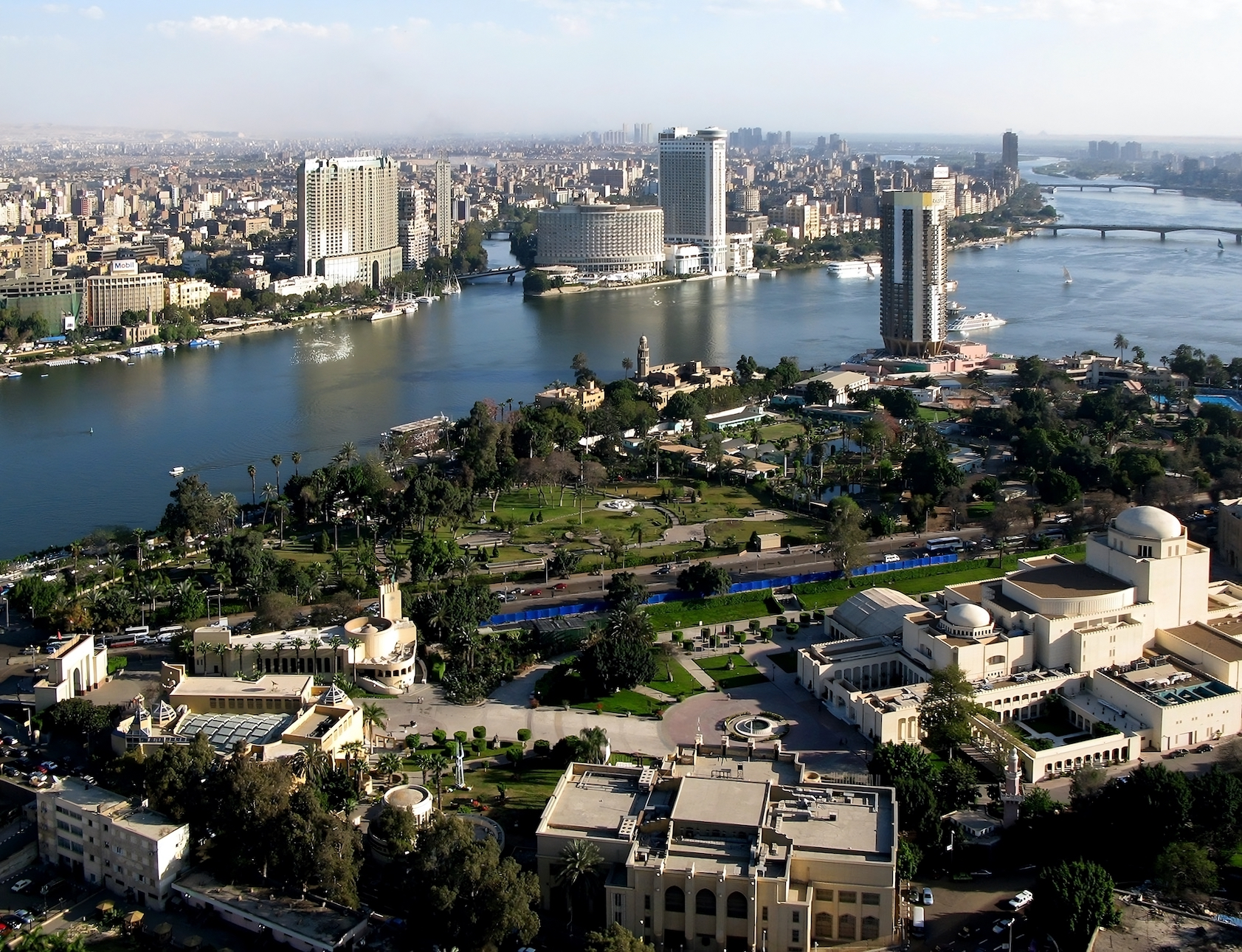
The Nile river is the only water source for most of Egypt, including its capital Cairo shown here.

Egypt's main source of freshwater is the Nile River. The river supplies 55 billion m^{3} of freshwater every year, which represents 97% of all renewable water resources in Egypt. Overall, the Nile River constitutes about 90% Egypt's water supply. Average rainfall in Egypt is estimated at 18 mm or 1.8 billion m^{3} per year. Furthermore, Egypt has four different groundwater aquifers: the Nile Aquifer, the Nubian Sandstone Aquifer, the Moghra Aquifer and the Coastal Aquifer. Since 2005, Egypt is classified as a water scarce country as it has less than 1000 m^{3} of fresh water per year per capita. Furthermore, it is forecasted that in 2025 the population will reach 95 million, which would mean a per capita share of only 600 m^{3} per year. Cities on the Red Sea coast such as Hurghada are supplied with water from the Nile pumped via pipelines. However, in 2015 a contract for an 80,000 m^{3}/day seawater desalination plant has been awarded to supply the city with water.

== Water access ==
In 2015, 98% of the population had access to "at least basic" water and 93% had access to "at least basic" sanitation. Nevertheless, there were still, 1.8 million people without access to "at least basic" water and 6.4 million without access to "at least basic" sanitation.

Access to Water and Sanitation in Egypt (2010)
		Urban (43% of the population)	Rural (57% of the population)	Total
Water	Broad definition	100%	63%	63%
Water	House connections	100%	93%	96%
Sanitation	Broad definition	97%	93%	95%
Sanitation	Sewage	n/a	n/a	50% (2006 census)

According to the Arab Republic of Egypt: Urban Sector Update, Egypt has reached the Millennium Development Goal of halving the number of people without proper access to safe water and sanitation by 2015 ahead of time in 2008. However, according to the government report of the same year, Egypt was still off track to achieve the sanitation target in rural areas, especially in Upper Egypt and in frontier governorates.

Soakaway latrines, which are common in rural areas, often do not work properly due to the high groundwater table. Infrequent emptying and cracks in the walls result in sewage leaks which contaminates the surrounding streets, canals, and groundwater. Trucks that empty latrines and septic tanks do not necessarily discharge septage into wastewater treatment plants, but rather dump the content in the environment.

== Water use and hygiene behavior ==
Water use allocation in Egypt

At the national level, domestic water use in Egypt was estimated at 5.5 billion cubic meters per year, accounting for 8% of total water consumption. This corresponded to an average daily usage of 200 liters per capita, nearly double the consumption level in Germany. However, actual domestic use was lower due to network losses and varied significantly across different regions. In the late 20th century, installed drinking water supply capacity ranged from 70 liters per capita per day (L/c/d) in Upper Egypt to 330 L/c/d in Cairo, while Alexandria recorded a consumption of approximately 300 L/c/d.

At the local level, a study conducted in the late 1980s on water and sanitation in two Nile Delta villages provided insights into rural water use and hygiene practices at the time. Villagers relied on three primary water sources: piped water from household connections or public standpipes, shallow wells with hand pumps, and canal water. Canals played a crucial role in household activities, as many women used them for laundry, washing utensils, and cleaning vegetables and grain.

Women preferred canal water to groundwater due to its softness and lack of brackishness. However, standpipe surroundings were often unclean, with residents viewing maintenance as a government responsibility rather than a communal duty. Shallow wells suffered from contamination, and sewerage systems were absent, leaving greywater unmanaged. Household latrines were primarily used by women, while men relied on mosque facilities or defecated in canals, and children defecated openly in streets or fields. Latrine waste was emptied by donkey carts or trucks, which often disposed of the contents into canals, exacerbating sanitation issues. These conditions contributed to persistently high infant mortality rates despite government efforts to expand water supply infrastructure through standpipes.

By the early 21st century, hygiene and sanitation conditions had significantly improved. Open defecation in rural areas declined from 17% in 1990 to less than 1% by 2005. While expanding access to water supply alone had limited impact on child mortality, subsequent improvements in sanitation and hygiene practices contributed to a significant decline in child mortality, from 90 deaths per 1,000 live births in 1990 to 23 in 2008.

== Infrastructure ==
As of 2008, there were 153 large and 817 small drinking water treatment plants, as well as 239 wastewater treatment plants. The length of the water distribution networks was 107,000 km and the length of the wastewater collection network was 29,000 km.

=== Drinking water quality ===
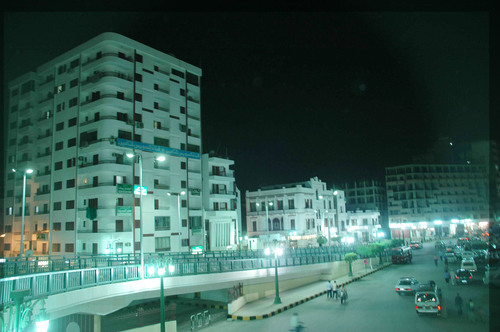
The city of Assiut where reports about contaminated drinking water emerged in 2009.

Throughout the 2000s and early 2010s, sanitation infrastructure deficiencies in Egypt posed significant public health risks. A 2007 report estimated that 17,000 children died annually from diarrheal diseases linked to poor sanitation, highlighting the dire consequences of inadequate wastewater management. Many water treatment plants suffered from poor maintenance, rendering them ineffective in removing parasites, viruses, and other parasitic microorganisms.

In 2009, a Ministry of Health study revealed that drinking water for 500,000 people in Asyut was unfit for human consumption. By June 2011, no remedial action had been taken. Chlorination systems installed in previous years to combat high bacterial contamination in groundwater had failed due to lack of maintenance, leading to their deactivation and exposing residents to untreated water.

Other regions faced similar crises. In 2007, residents of Wardan village in northern Giza reported darkened water, raising alarms over contamination. Authorities denied responsibility, attributing the issue to illegal shallow wells and private booster pumps used by residents to secure water access and pressure. Meanwhile, the Ministry of Environment acknowledged broader institutional failures, citing poor coordination between agencies, a lack of standardized monitoring, and inconsistent water quality analysis methods.

=== Wastewater treatment ===
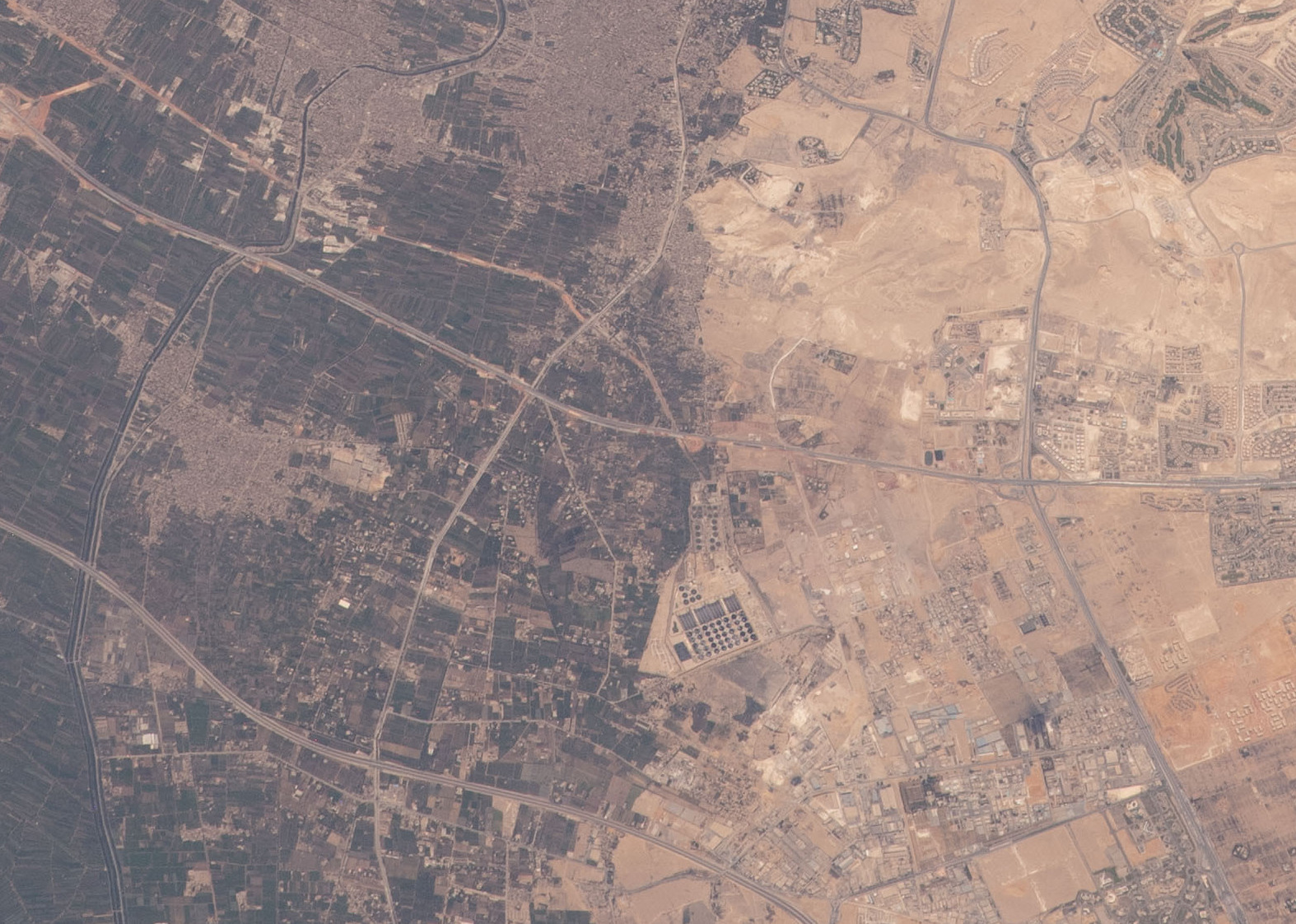
Abu Rawash Wastewater Treatment Plant

Egypt has significantly expanded its wastewater treatment capacity over the past two decades to address growing water demand and pollution concerns. By 2012, the country had 375 municipal wastewater treatment plants, treating an average of 10.1 million cubic meters per day. The number of plants increased tenfold between 1985 and 2005, and by 2021, total wastewater treatment capacity exceeded 16 million cubic meters per day.

The Gabal El Asfar Wastewater Treatment Plant, located northeast of Cairo, has been a key facility for water treatment. Initially completed in 1999 with a 1.2 million cubic meter per day capacity, it expanded to 2 million cubic meters per day by 2009. A further expansion to 2.5 million cubic meters per day, financed by the African Development Bank, was planned in 2013, with an ultimate goal of reaching 3 million cubic meters per day, serving 12 million people.

Located in western Giza, Abu Rawash initially treated 0.4 million cubic meters per day at a primary level. This was expanded to 1.2 million cubic meters per day by 2008. In 2013, a plan was launched to upgrade the plant to secondary treatment and expand its capacity to 1.6 million cubic meters per day under a public-private partnership with support from the European Bank for Reconstruction and Development (EBRD).

In 2021, the Bahr El Baqar Wastewater Treatment Plant was completed as the world’s largest at the time, with a capacity of 5 million cubic meters per day, supplying treated water for irrigating 342,000 acres in the Sinai Peninsula Development Plan. This was surpassed in 2023 by the New Delta Wastewater Treatment Plant, the largest globally, with a capacity of 7.5 million cubic meters per day. A core part of Egypt’s agricultural expansion strategy, it supports the New Delta reclamation project while reducing pollution in Lake Mariout and the Mediterranean Sea.

An effort to limit microplastics reaching the ocean is underway for wastewater treatment plants in Alexandria, with a €120 million loan from the European Investment Bank. Sludge treatment is part of the project, which will generate biogas and minimize the need of fossil fuels. This effort aims to enhance wastewater treatment facilities for 1.5 million people in the area.

== History ==
=== From the 19th century to contemporary Egypt ===
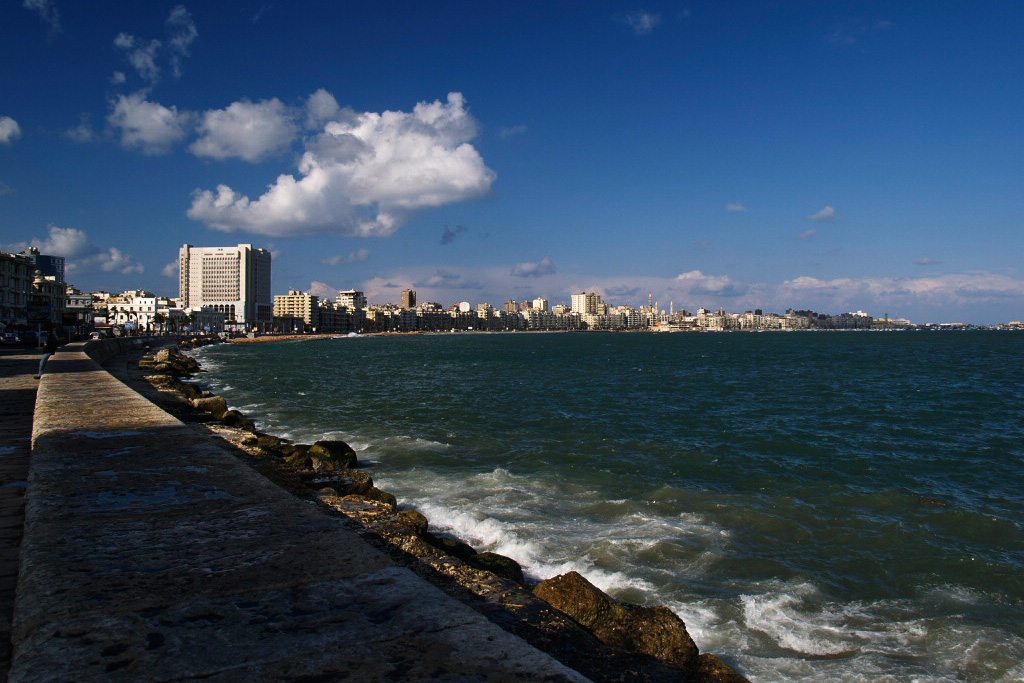
Drinking water in Alexandria was supplied by a foreign private company from 1860 until 1956.

The first modern water companies in Egypt were created by European private investors in Alexandria and Cairo in the 1860s under the Khedivate of Egypt. At the same time, the French-British Suez Canal Company operated, alongside the Suez Canal itself, the drinking water supply for the Suez Canal cities Port Said, Suez and Ismailia, the latter city having been created by the company.

The Cairo and Alexandria water companies were nationalized in 1956, along with the nationalization of the Suez Canal by the socialist government of Gamal Abdel Nasser. For the promotion of investments in provincial cities, two state agencies were created, one in charge of water supply and one in charge of sanitation.

=== Economic opening and the arrival of foreign aid in the 1970s ===
With the economic opening of Egypt under the government of Anwar Sadat in the 1970s (Infitah) substantial foreign aid arrived. In particular, USAID provided assistance for water supply and sanitation in Greater Cairo, Alexandria and the Suez Canal cities. Provincial cities and rural areas, however, were initially neglected. About half of the investments undertaken at that time were made in Cairo and Alexandria, although only a quarter of the population lived there.

Achievements. As a result of massive externally funded investments access to water supply and sanitation increased substantially during the next decades. For example, water production capacity increased from 5.5 million cubic meters per day in 1982 to 21 million in 2004 and per capita water consumption increased from 130 to 275 liter per day during the same period.

Challenges. However, the organizations in charge of operating and maintaining the infrastructure were weak in terms of financial and human resources, especially in provincial Egypt, so that service quality remained poor. A World Bank sector study in the late 1970s observed "dismal conditions", such as

"(i) fragmentation of operational responsibility;

(ii) poor maintenance and operation;
(iii) excessive water losses;
(iv) inadequate investment level;
(v) shortage of skilled staff; and

(vi) low tariffs and inadequate cost recovery."

Concerning inadequate cost recovery, in provincial Egypt only about one-third of the operating cost was recovered. Rural water supply was mostly through standpipes that provided water for free. All the meagre revenues were transferred to the Central Government, which in turn provided subsidies that were insufficient for proper operation and maintenance.

Only one of the six problems diagnosed in the 1970s has been resolved: investment levels have substantially increased and have remained high. However, the other problems still largely prevail more than three decades later despite two sector reforms carried out in 1981 and 2004.

Sector fragmentation and its consequences. The structure of the drinking water supply sector in the mid-1970s illustrates the problem of fragmentation:

- In Cairo and Alexandria water infrastructure was owned and operated by local water authorities - the Alexandria Water General Authority (AWGA) and the General Organization for Greater Cairo Water Supply (GOGCWS);
- in the Suez Canal cities, both water and sewer infrastructure were owned and operated by the Suez Canal Authority (SCA);
- the General Organization for Potable Water (GOPW) built and operated seven regional water systems, mainly in the Nile delta provinces;
- 115 municipalities owned and operated water systems in the larger provincial towns; and
- governorate housing directorates operated about 1250 rural water supply systems relying on boreholes or wells serving those areas not covered by municipalities or GOPW.

The responsibility for wastewater collection and disposal systems was almost equally fragmented. It consisted of:

- 17 municipal systems of which Cairo's and Alexandria's were by far the largest. They were owned and operated by the General Organization for Greater Cairo Sanitary Drainage (GOGCSD) and the Alexandria General Organization for Sanitary Drainage (AGOSD), respectively.
- In provincial Egypt, investment in sewerage systems was the responsibility of the General Organization for Sewerage and Sanitary Drainage (GOSSD).
- Operation of such systems, however, was the responsibility of municipalities.

The planning of infrastructure for water supply and sanitation was separated between two organizations, GOPW and GOSSD. As a result, some towns or neighborhoods received access to piped water supply, but not to sewers, which led to a deterioration of the hygiene situation.

=== The 1981 reforms: Reduced fragmentation and creation of public companies ===
To remedy this situation, donors pushed for a sector reform. The government initiated the reform in 1981 with two key elements: First, it merged the water investment agency GOPW and the sanitation investment agency GOSSD in a single new entity called NOPWASD. Second, it promoted the creation of autonomous water and wastewater companies in each governorate, following the example of the existing companies in Cairo and Alexandria. However, the central government did not push hard for their creation. Two decades later only three such companies were created.

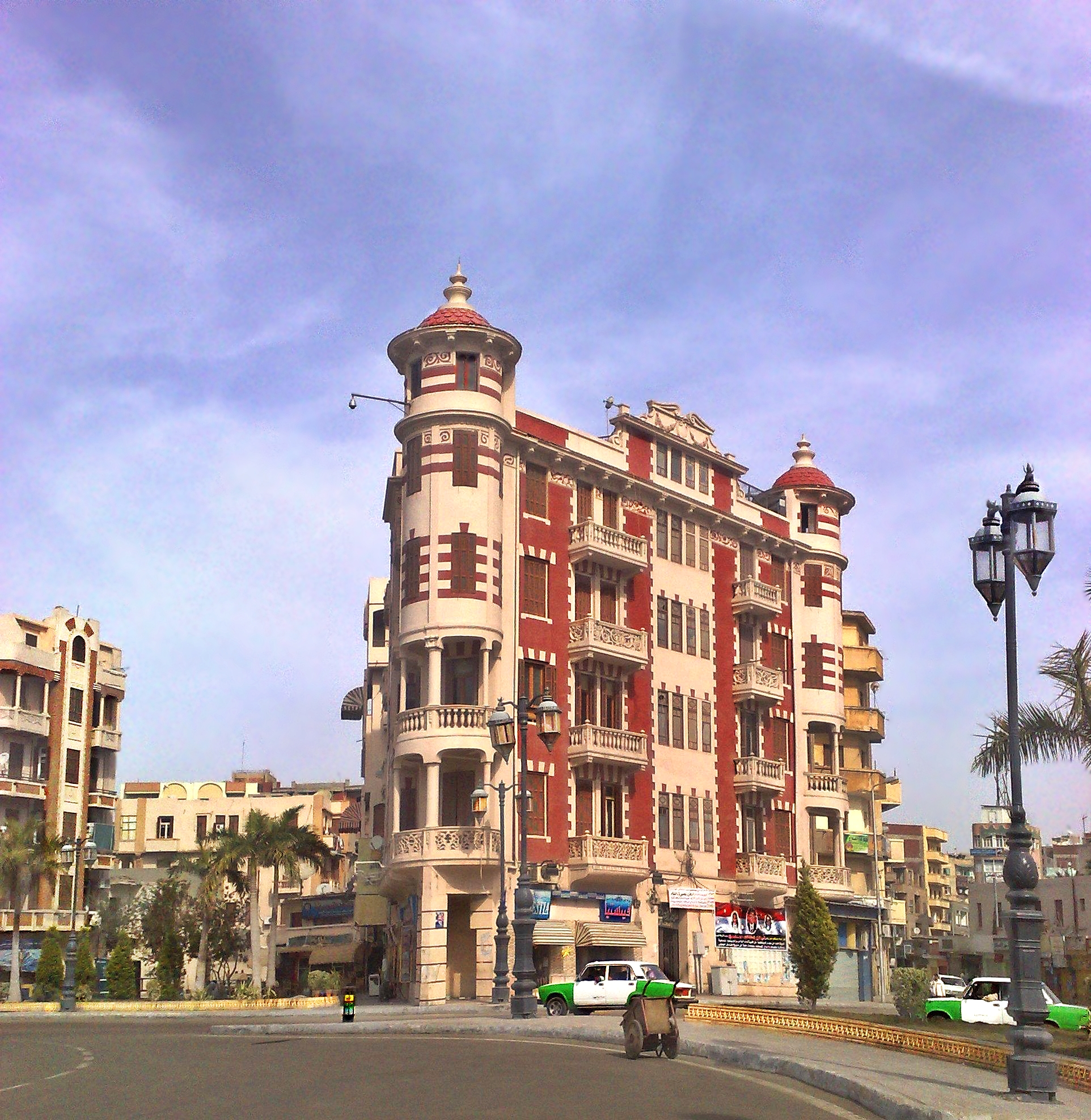
A building in Damanhur, the capital of Beheira governorate where the first autonomous public water company in Egypt outside of Cairo and Alexandria was created in 1981.

The Water Companies in the Nile Delta. The governor of Beheira governorate, located next to Alexandria, created the first such company, the Beheira Water Company, by decree in 1981. With financing from the World Bank and France, facilities in the governorate were renovated and expanded. This led to some positive results: water supply became continuous and cost recovery for operating costs was achieved. However, the project took 13 years to complete, 7 years longer than expected and experienced 67 percent cost overruns.

Two more water companies were created in the late 1980s, both also in the Nile Delta governorates and under the influence of external financiers: the Damietta water company with support from the World Bank and the Kafr el-Sheikh water and wastewater company with support from Germany. In other governorates, such as in Daqahliya, resistance from the governors and from NOPWASD prevented the creation of a water company despite pressure by external donors.

The three water companies were less successful than expected. A 1991 USAID report concluded:

"These water companies were intended to be autonomous, to generate revenues sufficient to cover operation and maintenance costs and to have flexibility in personnel actions. The three companies have not attained the intended goals. (…) The water companies are not as independent or as decentralized as was intended, are not financially viable."

Public Economic Authorities in other governorates. Seven other governorates (Aswan Governorate, Minya Governorate, Beni Suef Governorate, Faiyum Governorate, Dakahlia Governorate, Gharbia Governorate and Sharqia Governorate) created Public Economic Authorities for water supply which took over the responsibility to operate water supply systems from the former regional systems that had been operated by GOPW. These units had less scope for financial and managerial autonomy than the water companies.

National Water Pricing Policy. In 1985 the government adopted a National Water Pricing Policy with the objective to gradually reach full operation and maintenance cost recovery for water by 1991. The policy also introduced a sewer surcharge set at just 10% of the water bill. The policy also provided for incentives (10 percent of total income) in the form of bonuses to workers in the water industry. However, tariffs were not increased as foreseen by the policy.

Remaining challenges. In 2000, almost 10 years later, things had not much changed. A report by NOPWASD stated that institutional capacity and cost recovery in the sector remained low. Infrastructure continued to fall into disrepair, while the entities in charge of water supply and sewerage systems ran large deficits that were only partly covered through subsidies. At that time, the Alexandria Water Company was the only water company in Egypt to cover its operating costs. The report concluded that there was a "duplication of administrative entities, low cost recovery ratios, and lack of qualified management and modern management systems". A few years later, another government report observed that water and wastewater service providers were overstaffed with poorly qualified and poorly paid employees, that there was no system to evaluate staff performance, that billing and collection were poor and done manually, that there was no system to respond to citizen complaints, and no procedures for maintenance.

=== The 2004 reforms: Creation of the Holding Company and private sector participation ===
Genesis of the reforms. When donors expressed their dissatisfaction with the poor performance of the sector, the government initiated another sector reform that, again, aimed at improving service quality, gradually attaining a financial equilibrium and improving staff skills. The Ministry of Housing charged NOPWASD with the elaboration of a diagnostic study and recommendations for reforms. This was to be done under the label of decentralization through the creation of commercially oriented companies at the governorate level, just as recommended two decades earlier. However, two new elements were added to the reforms: private sector participation and autonomous regulation.

The study was presented to the Cabinet of Ministers in 1998. The Cabinet charged the Ministry of Housing with the elaboration of two documents: a decree on the reorganization of the water and wastewater sector, as well as a law on public utility concessions for water and wastewater. Both were initially approved in principle by Cabinet in 2000. However, the water concession law was never passed. A decree for the creation of a regulatory agency was also circulated. The process of enacting the reforms took many more years. During this time the decree on the reorganization of the sector was modified, creating a Holding Company that would de facto compete with NOPWASD.

Creation of the Holding Company. In April 2004 the decree that created the Holding Company, which was to become a central institution of the sector, was enacted. The existing 7 water and wastewater companies (2 in Cairo, 2 in Alexandria, and the 3 in the Nile Delta) as well as the existing 7 Public Economic Authorities were all transformed into Affiliated Companies of the Holding Company. While the Holding Company did not become responsible for investment, it was responsible for the acquisition of equipment to modernize its Affiliated Companies and for training their staff. Also, it became a key interlocutor for foreign donors.

Creation of a regulatory agency. In 2006 the sector reforms were complemented by the creation of a regulatory agency, the Egyptian Water Regulatory Agency. The creation of an "autonomous" regulatory agency for utilities was a standard recommendation made by donors for infrastructure sector reforms in developing countries at that time. The agency's tasks include reviewing proposals for tariff adjustments, monitoring the application of technical standards and reviewing customer complaints. The agency also has a mandate to both promote and regulate private sector participation. These tasks overlap with the tasks of other agencies, such as the Holding Company (which also reviews proposals for tariff adjustments, alongside the Ministry of Housing and the Cabinet), the public companies (which also review complaints) and the PPP Central Unit (which also promotes private sector participation). Five years after its creation, the regulatory agency remains a relatively weak and marginal entity whose autonomy is doubtful.

Private sector participation. In 2006 the government created a Public-Private Partnerships (PPP) Central Unit in the Ministry of Finance to promote private greenfield investments in infrastructure across various sectors. In the water sector, the unit promoted large Build-Operate-Transfer (BOT) projects for new wastewater treatment plants in Cairo and Alexandria. The unit left the operation of the utilities untouched.

Implementing the reforms. With the passing of the reforms, tariffs in Greater Cairo were increased from an extremely low base level by 100% as a signal to donors that the reforms were serious. The Holding Company started a program to replace 800,000 non-functioning meters, created a central laboratory, procured SCADA and GIS systems for the public companies and established customer hotlines. Furthermore, the Holding Company established a performance benchmarking system including bonus payments that are paid to companies that improve their performance. As a result of the reforms, donors re-engaged in the sector.

Unresolved challenges. While the reforms addressed some issues, others remain unresolved. For example, sector fragmentation was not actually reduced. No organization was dissolved; instead several new organizations were created. Cost recovery is still very low; overstaffing has apparently even increased from about 6.5 employees per 1000 connections in the early 2000s to about 10 in 2008. Also, the separation of responsibilities for investment and operation in provincial Egypt has not been addressed: NOPWASD remains in charge of investment, while the Affiliated Companies are only in charge of operation.

Overcoming the separation of investment and operation?. In the absence of a comprehensive reform, European donors have begun to address this issue at the project level. Under the Improved Water and Sanitation Program (IWSP), approved in 2009, the water and sanitation companies will be responsible for carrying out investments, thus by-passing NOPWASD. IWSP is jointly funded by four European financiers and the Egyptian government with a volume of 295 million Euro for its first phase. However, the World Bank under its Integrated Sanitation and Sewerage Infrastructure Project approved in 2008 (US$320m in two phases) continues to channel investments through NOPWASD.

=== Impact of the Arab Spring (2011 onwards) ===
The Arab spring temporarily diverted policy attention away from sector reforms, while the financial situation of the Egyptian water utilities deteriorated because of wage increases that were not fully compensated through higher subsidies. Furthermore, the bill collection ratio further declined. In 2012, the government of Mohamed Morsi created a Ministry of Water and Sanitation, which was formerly part of the Ministry of Housing.

== Responsibility for water supply and sanitation ==
=== Policy and regulation ===
Egyptian water sector policies are set by several ministries. The Ministry of Water Supply and Sanitation Facilities, created in 2012, took over its functions from the Ministry of Housing, Utilities and Urban Communities that had previously been in charge of the sector. The Ministry of Water Resources and Irrigation (previously called Ministry of Public Works and Water Resources) is in charge of water resources management and irrigation. The Ministry of Health and Population is responsible for monitoring drinking water quality. The Egyptian Environmental Affairs Agency is responsible for environmental affairs and the assessment and monitoring of water use. The Holding Company for Water and Wastewater, founded by decree in 2004, is responsible for the financial and technical sustainability to the Governorate-based utilities. The Egyptian Water Regulatory Agency (EWRA), established in 2006, is in charge of the economic and technical regulation of utilities.

After a visit by the UN Special Rapporteur for the human right to safe drinking water and sanitation in 2009, she noted limited transparency and accountability of the government to its citizens concerning water and sanitation. She received numerous accounts of complaints to the authorities about drinking water supply that remained without a response. She noted that it was "exceedingly difficult to obtain information about the quality of (...) drinking water" and "there was confusion about where to send complaints" - the Holding Company, the Ministry of Health or the Regulatory Agency. "The overlapping responsibilities create a situation where no institution considers itself accountable for the problem in question", she concluded, adding that "the overall lack of transparency and access to information in the water and sanitation sectors creates an atmosphere of suspicion, which is characterized by a lack of confidence in the quality of drinking water and overall distrust of the Government and the Holding Company."

The Ministry of Housing, Utilities and Urban Communities approved a Water and Wastewater Sector Policy Paper in September 2010, which enshrines the human right to water in the policy. As of 2012, the Ministry was in the process of elaborating a national strategy based on the policy paper, including several sub-strategies on topics such as tariffs, informal settlement and rural sanitation.

=== Service provision ===
==== Public institutions ====
The Ministry of Water Supply and Sanitation Facilities supervises all institutions in charge of providing water and sanitation services. Broadly speaking, these are two types of institutions: those in charge of investment and those in charge of operation. However, this separation is not always clear-cut, since some companies in charge of operation also carry out investments.

Three institutions are in charge of planning and supervision of infrastructure construction:

- the Cairo and Alexandria Potable Water Organisation (CAPWO) for the country's two largest cities,
- The National Organisation for Potable Water and Sanitary Drainage (NOPWASD) for the rest of the country excluding new communities, and
- The New Urban Communities Authority is responsible for water supply and sanitation investments in new communities, of which 22 with five million inhabitants have been built so far alongside 29 drinking water plants, 10,000 km of water pipelines, 7,000 km of sewer pipelines and 26 wastewater plants.

The Holding Company for Water and Wastewater (HCWW) and its 26 Affiliated Companies are in charge of operation and maintenance of water and sanitation infrastructure. The Holding Company owns all water and sanitation infrastructure in Egypt. Its Affiliated Companies include:

- The General Organization for Greater Cairo Water Supply (GOGCWS)
- The Cairo General Organization for Sewerage and Drainage (CGOSD)
- The Alexandria Water Company, AWCO
- The Alexandria Sanitary Drainage Company (ASDCO)
- 22 Affiliated Companies, each covering one or more of Egypt's 29 governorates and being in charge of both water supply and sewerage. The companies that cover several governorates include one for the Canal governorates (Suez, Port Said and Ismailia), and one for the Sinai (North and South Sinai governorates).

In some governorates water and sewer services are still provided directly by the Holding Company. It is envisaged to establish Affiliated Companies in all governorates, bringing the total number of Affiliated Companies to 28.

According to the Egyptian Water Regulatory Agency the five highest-performing Affiliated Companies in 2012/13 were Behira, Gharbia, Dakahlia, Sharkia and the Alexandria Water Company in the order listed, all located in the Nile Delta. The five Affiliated Companies with the worst performance are, in the order listed, Aswan, Luxor, Qena (all located in Upper Egypt), Sinai and Marsa Matrouh (located in peripherical areas). The performance is measured through a weighted score that consists of the following indicators: cost recovery (30% weight), collection efficiency (30%), subscribers billed on the basis of metering, number of employees per 1000 connections, water losses, and cooperation with EWRA (each 10% weight).

==== Private sector participation ====
The government's support for private sector participation in water supply and sanitation is focused on build-operate-transfer (BOT) for wastewater treatment plants, through which private finance is mobilized. This approach is limited to Cairo and Alexandria where external donors had become less keen to provide assistance. The first BOT wastewater for US$160 million for the New Cairo wastewater treatment plant with a capacity of 250,000 m^{3}/day was awarded in 2010 and was due to be completed at the end of 2012. However, the joint venture of Orascom and Aqualia from Spain, a subsidiary of FCC, found itself plagued by currency fluctuations and problems in commissioning the plant. The lead advisor for the structuring of the transaction was the International Finance Corporation of the World Bank Group.

The contract for another large wastewater treatment plant, the upgrade of the 1.2 million m^{3}/day Abu Rawash plant for US$500 million, was delayed for many years. The European Bank for Reconstruction and Development has announced its interest in supporting the project through a local currency loan. The Holding Company for Water and Wastewater plans to launch BOTs for seawater desalination on the Red Sea and the Sinai, together with the government's Public-Private-Partnership (PPP) unit that would provide a sovereign guarantee. The private sector has also become involved in other functions beyond construction and consulting. For example, in Cairo, Suez and Ismailia a private company has been engaged to inspect water and wastewater networks, reduce leakage and install water meters.

== Economic efficiency ==
The share of non-revenue water in Egypt was estimated at 32% in 2012/13., slightly lower than the level of 34% in 2005 and much lower than the level of 40-50% estimated for the 1990s. The good practice benchmark in the region is in Tunisia where the level of non-revenue water is 18%.

Egyptian utilities are overstaffed. They employed 98,500 staff in 2008 for 9.5 million subscribers, equivalent to more than 10 employees per 1000 connections. In 2012/13 this figure has decreased to 6.5 according to EWRA. Good practice for water and sanitation utilities is to have less than 5 employees.

== Financial aspects ==
Water and sewer tariffs in Egypt are among the lowest in the world. Despite their affordability, almost half the bills are not paid and politicians are reluctant to increase tariffs, especially since the Arab Spring. Thus only a fraction of costs is recovered through revenues from tariffs. The shortfall in revenues is partly made up by government subsidies for investment and operations at the tune of US$2.5bn per year, of which only about 10 percent is financed by external donors.

=== Tariffs and other prices ===
Tariff level. Water and sewer tariffs in Egypt are very low in international comparison. 80% of subscribers receive a bill based on meter readings. Other subscribers are charged a flat rate which is estimated according to the kind of building. In Cairo residential water tariffs were 29 piastres (about 5 US cents) per m^{3} in 2008. Sewerage is charged as a 63% surcharge to the water bill. In August 2017 the Egyptian government approved an increase of domestic water tariffs of up to 50%, prompted by IMF conditions to reduce subsidies. The price of water will increase to a range of EGP0.45-2.15/m3 ($0.03-$0.12/m3). Tariffs for industrial and commercial customers are much higher than residential tariffs. Businesses thus will pay up to EGP6.95/m3 ($0.39/m3).

According to a 2009 study by GIZ, tariffs at the time varied between 0.04 EUR per m^{3} in Gharbiya Governorate to 0.07 EUR per m^{3} in Alexandria. Coca-Cola paid 3 Egyptian Pounds per cubic meter in Alexandria in 2012.

Tariff structure. There are numerous customer classifications resulting in complex tariffs that vary, among others, depending on the customer's line of business, the effluent produced by the customer, the seasonality of water use, and a customer's distance from the water mains. Many water tariffs are uniform, i.e. the same tariff applies for each unit of consumption, if the water use is metered at all. Some Affiliated Companies have increasing-block tariffs for metered customers, i.e. the unit rate increases with consumption. But even in this case there the amount of water included in the first blocks is so large that there is little incentive to save water.

Tariff setting. Residential tariffs are set centrally and are almost the same all over Egypt. In certain areas they were raised after the reforms of 2005, and again in 2017. Residential tariff increases have to be approved by the holding company, the national water regulatory agency EWRA, the Ministry of Water Supply and Sanitation, the Cabinet of Ministers, the President of the Republic and the National Assembly. Tariffs in some areas have not been increased for more than two decades since 1992,. Since the Arab Spring residential tariff increases have become even more difficult to approve. Industrial tariffs, however, can be set by Affiliated Companies without government approval. However, the rising subsidy bill compelled the government to approve tariff increases in 2017.

Affordability. Based on a tariff of 5 US Cents per m^{3} and a consumption of 200 liter per capita and day, which is higher than in Central Europe, the monthly water bill of a family of five amounts only to the equivalent of US$1.50. According to a study done by the consulting firm Chemonics for the EU in 2009, a household consuming 218 liter per capita per day paid a water and sewer bill equivalent to 0.81% of total household expenditure. Only 11% of households (constituting 7.4% of the population) spent over 1% on water and wastewater.

Connection fees. Connection fees are a significant expenditure for households. In poor areas, connection fees are reduced and can be paid in instalments through a revolving fund established by the Holding Company, UNICEF and USAID.

Prices paid to water vendors. In some slums the majority of residents does not have legal access to water, and most people get water from tankers or water points. Because residents lack legal title over the land that they occupy, they are unable to connect legally to the water and sanitation network. Water provided by tankers costs two to three Egyptian pounds for 25 litres, approximately 300 times more than the tariff for piped water.

Costs of emptying septic tanks. The cost of emptying septic tanks can be significant. Some people avoid using their septic tanks, because if they do the tank fills up more quickly and they must pay to empty it more often. They thus continue to pollute the surrounding environment, although they have sanitation facilities at home.

=== Cost recovery and subsidies ===
The Egyptian government highly subsidizes the sector. The Egyptian Water Regulatory Agency estimates the degree of overall cost recovery in 2012/13 at 62%, and the recovery of operation and maintenance costs excluding depreciation at 76%. The regulator classifies this as insufficient compared to a good performance of more than 80% full cost recovery and more than 100% operation and maintenance cost recovery. This is lower than the degree of cost recovery achieved in 2010, when the recovery of operation and maintenance costs, excluding depreciation, through operating revenues was 95% for water supply and sanitation, ranging from 31% in Sinai to 134% in Beheira. Nevertheless, the degree of cost recovery is apparently higher than it was in the early 2000s. According to one estimate dating from prior to 2007, cost recovery was only 20%, with tariffs at 0.23 EP per m^{3} and costs at 1.10 EP per m^{3}. According to another estimate, between 1982 and 2004 the government spent 65 billion Egyptian pounds (about US$10.73 billion at the exchange rate of 2004) for water supply and sanitation, of which 40% was recovered through tariff revenues.

The average bill collection rate (total collection efficiency) was estimated at 47% in 2012/13. In 2010 it had been 57%, ranging from 48% in Cairo to 85% in Beni Suef.

=== Investment and financing ===
Investments in water supply and sanitation for Egypt exceeded US$9.15 bn over the 20 years prior to 2007. They stood at US$2.2bn in 2009/2010, suggesting a significant increase in investment over the previous years. According to a different source, investment was much lower at 4 billion Egyptian Pounds (US$650 million) in 2011 and 3 billion Egyptian Pounds (US$490 million) in 2012. The National Master Plan for Water Supply and Sanitation conservatively estimates the investment needs for the 30 years after 2007 at about Euro 20bn, out of which almost two thirds will be required for sanitation.

Financing. Investments are mostly financed by the government with the support of external donors. The private sector makes a limited contribution to finance, mostly through a single BOT that has so far been awarded for a US$160 million wastewater treatment plant. Between 2005 and 2010 Egypt received more than 1bn Euro in external aid for water supply and sanitation, out of which 30% were grants and the remainder soft loans with an average interest rate of 1%. This corresponds to EUR 200 million per year, corresponding to only about 10% of the government's investment budget for the sector in 2009/10. According to the Ministry of Housing, government subsidies to water and wastewater utilities amounted to more than 15 billion Egyptian pounds (US$2.5bn) in 2009/10, including EP 13.4bn (US$2.2bn) investment subsidies, EP 0.66 bn (US$0.1bn) operating subsidies and EP 1 bn (US$0.2bn) repair and rehabilitation subsidies.

== External cooperation ==
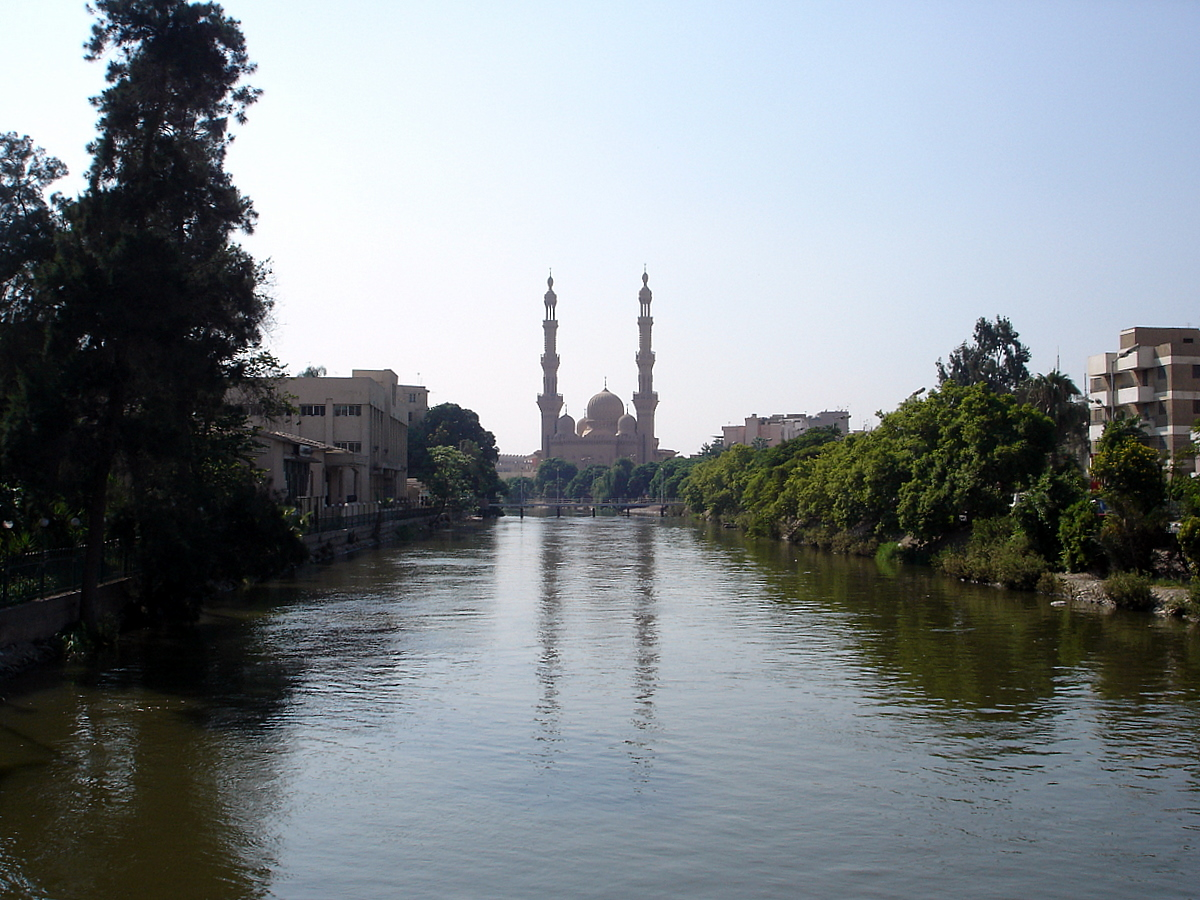
A view of Zagazig, the capital of the Al Sharqia Governorate, one of four governorates where four European financiers provide support under the Improved Water and Wastewater Program.

The European Union, France, Germany, the United States and the World Bank are among the most important external cooperation partners in the Egyptian water and sanitation sector in terms of funding. Several other bilateral donors, as well as UNDP and UNICEF, are also active in the sector.

European donors increasingly fund projects jointly under the EU's Neighborhood Investment Facility (NIF), which supports the Improved Water and Wastewater Services Program (IWSP) in four governorates in the Delta during its first phase (Gharbia, Sharkia, Damietta, and Beheira) and four governorates in Upper Egypt during its second phase. IWSP pools loans from Germany, France and the European Investment Bank as well as a grant from the European Commission, which is used as an incentive for the other donors to pool their loans and to thus harmonize their procedures.

There is a water donor group co-chaired by the EU and the Netherlands. As of 2012, the Netherlands was in the process of phasing out its assistance to the water and sanitation sector.

=== European Union ===
The European Union provides budget support in the form of grants, institutional strengthening, the support of a National Master Plan for Water Supply and Sanitation, as well as financing for a radio network and water meters. Budget support is through a so-called Water Sector Reform Programme, including a first phase of 80 million Euro (2005–2009) and a second phase of 120 million Euro (2011–2015). Funds for institutional strengthening are provided to the Egyptian Water Regulatory Authority (6m Euro for 2008–2010 and 1.5m for 2011–2013) and the Holding Company (1.5m Euro for 2011–2013). The EU also co-finances investment jointly funded with bilateral European donors and the European Investment Bank, in particular the Improved Water and Wastewater Services Program IWSP.

=== France ===
The French Development Agency supports the IWSP (see above). It contributes with 40 million Euro to the total project cost of 295 million Euro.

=== Germany ===
Germany provides investment finance and technical assistance for projects in Qena and Kafr El Sheikh, as well as for the IWSP (see above), for which KfW is the lead donor. The technical cooperation agency GIZ is active in strengthening the capacity of the Holding Company and the two Affiliated Companies in Qena and Kafr el Sheikh.

=== United States ===
The United States has supported the development of Egypt's water and sanitation sector since the early 1980s. It provided support to the sector reforms that established the holding company and the regulatory agency. USAID funded wastewater treatment plants throughout the country, including in Alexandria where it financed the expansion of the wastewater collection and treatment system to elimination raw wastewater discharge into the sea. It also financed technical assistance to the Alexandria General Water Authority (AGWA) through a strategic plan, training and a management information system.

It also financed water treatment plants in villages in Minya and Beni Suef Governorate as well as in Mansoura City, the capital of Dakahlia Governorate, all in the Nile Delta. In 2008 USAID began two technical assistance projects, one to provide managerial systems and tools to utilities, the other aimed at "developing a strategic plan for the sector", "creating a framework for public-private partnerships", and "improving investment planning" at the national level.

=== World Bank ===
The Integrated Sanitation and Sewerage Infrastructure Project was approved in 2008 and is expected to end in 2014. Its main objective is the sustainable improvement of the sanitation and environmental conditions as well as the water quality in the three Delta Governorates of Beheira, Gharbia and Kafr El-Sheikh. Furthermore, a local result-based monitoring and evaluation system will be established in order to improve sanitation coverage and thus environmental and health conditions. The project also contains a component of institutional development and capacity building. According to the World Bank, the project is the first large scale effort to address rural sanitation in Egypt. The total cost of the project is US$201.5 million, out of which the World Bank provides more than half (US$120 million). A second phase of the project, extending it to four more governorates (Menoufia and Sharkia in the Delta, Assiut and Sohag in Upper Egypt) was approved in 2011 with a volume of US$200 million.

=== Others ===
The following other external partners were active in the sector in 2008:

- Denmark provided technical assistance to the Aswan Water and Wastewater Company,
- Italy provided assistance to the Cairo Water Company to procure leak detection equipment and provide training,
- Japan provided technical assistance to the Sharqia Water and Wastewater Company, and
- The Netherlands supported an Integrated Sanitation Project. As of 2012, the Netherlands was in the process of phasing out its assistance to the water and sanitation sector.
- UNICEF supports school sanitation and hygiene, including in Qena governorate.

== See also ==
- Water resources management in modern Egypt
- The National Water Research Center (Egypt)
