= Water resources management in Egypt =

Water resources management in Egypt is a complex process that involves multiple stakeholders who use water for irrigation, municipal and industrial water supply, hydropower generation and navigation. In addition, the waters of the Nile support aquatic ecosystems that are threatened by abstraction and pollution. Egypt also has substantial fossil groundwater resources in the Western Desert.

A key problem of water resources management in Egypt is the imbalance between increasing water demand and limited supply. To ensure future water availability coordination with the nine upstream Nile riparian countries is essential. The Nile Basin Initiative provides a forum for such cooperation. In the 1990s the government launched three mega-projects to increase irrigation on "new lands". They are located in the Toshka area (the "New Valley"), on the fringe of the Western Nile Delta, and in the Northern Sinai. These projects all require substantial amounts of water that can only be mobilized through better irrigation efficiency on already irrigated "old lands" as well as the reuse of drainage water and treated wastewater.

The management of the water supply in Egypt is expected to get more complicated as climate change increases the variability of weather, puts increasing pressure on upstream countries, and causes sea level rise which will cause saltwater intrusion and salinisation on delta lands.

== History ==
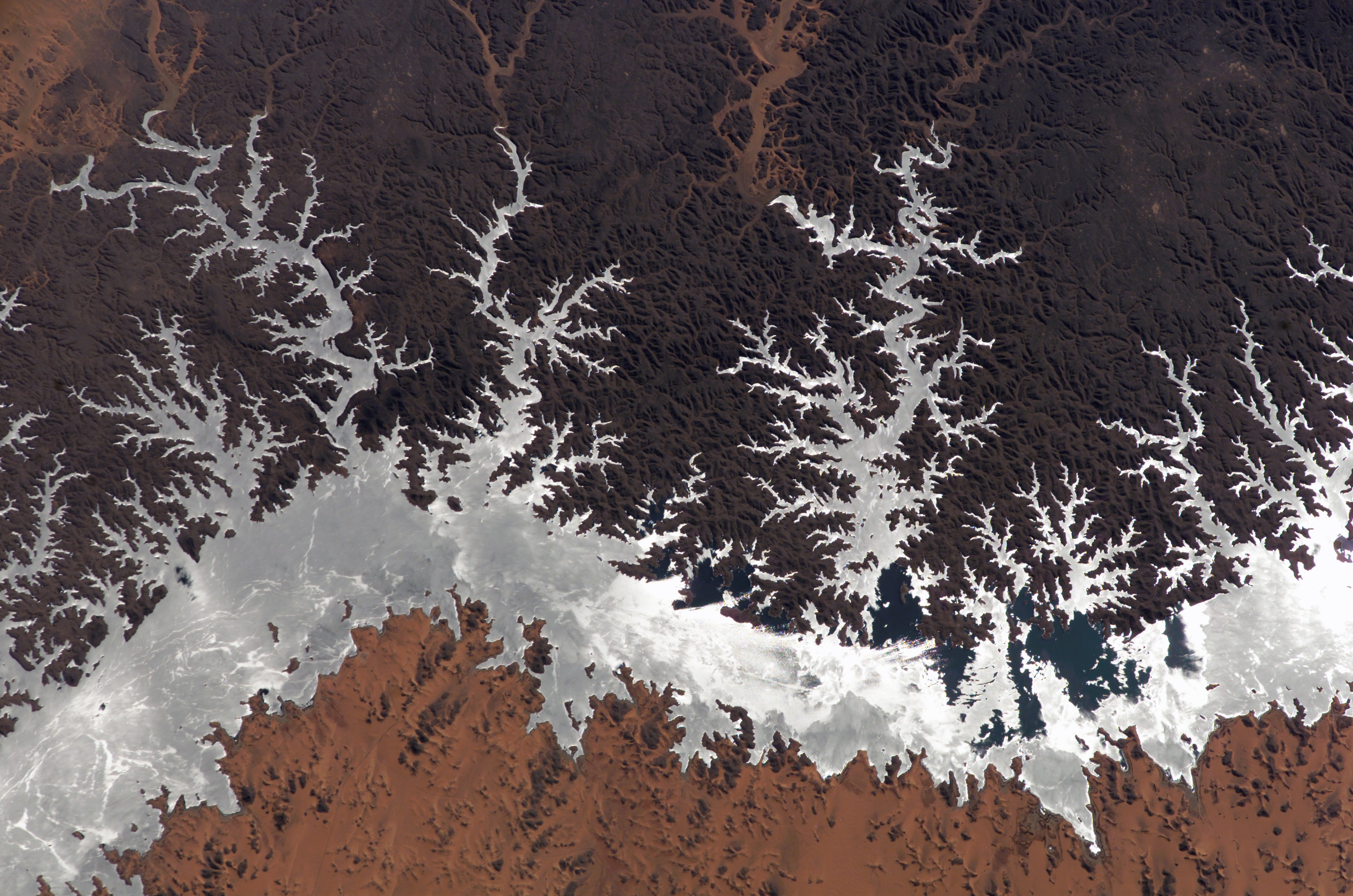
Lake Nasser behind the Aswan High Dam

The history of modern water management in Egypt begins with the construction of the Old Aswan Dam in 1902 and barrages on the Nile in the 19th and early 20th century. The Old Aswan Dam partially stored the waters of the Nile to allow the growing of multiple crops per year in the Nile Delta, while the barrages raised the water level of the Nile so that water could be diverted into large irrigation channels running in parallel to the river. The water regime of the river was changed fundamentally in 1970 when the Aswan High Dam was completed, eliminating the annual Nile flood. The dam brought major benefits such as increased water availability for Egyptian agriculture leading to higher income and employment, hydropower production, flood control, improved navigation, and the creation of fisheries in Lake Nasser. But it also had environmental and social impacts including resettlement, loss of fertile silt that now accumulates in the reservoir behind the dam, waterlogging combined with an increase in soil salinity, and increased coastal erosion.

Unrelated to the construction of the Aswan High Dam, water quality deteriorated through drainage return flows and discharges of untreated municipal and industrial wastewater. Beginning in the 1980s wastewater treatment improved and water quality in the Nile gradually improved again. Until 1992 the government decided which crops farmers had to grow, which allowed the authorities to deliver specific volumes of water to each canal based on the water needs of the crops. In 1992 a major change occurred when cropping patterns were liberalized and farmers were free to grow what they wanted. At the same time the government began to transfer the responsibility for the management of branch canals to water user associations, a process called "irrigation management transfer". In the mid-1990s the government also initiated three mega-projects to expand irrigation to "new lands" in the desert.

== Infrastructure ==
=== Existing infrastructure ===
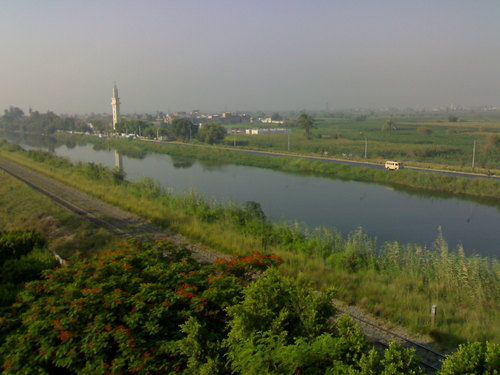
The Ibrahimiya Canal in Minya

Water resources management in Egypt depends on a complex set of infrastructure along the entire length of the river. The key element of this infrastructure is the Aswan High Dam that forms Lake Nasser. The High Dam protects Egypt from floods, stores water for year-round irrigation and produces hydropower. With a live storage capacity of 90 billion cubic the dam stores more than one and a half the average annual flow of the Nile River, thus providing a high level of regulation in the river basin compared to other regulated rivers in the world.

Downstream of the Aswan Dam, there are seven barrages to increase the river's water level so that it can flow into first-level irrigation canals. One of them is the 350 km long Ibrahimiya Canal completed in 1873, the largest artificial canal in the world. It branches off the left bank of the Nile in Assiut and then runs parallel to the river. Its discharge was increased by the Assiut Barrage completed in 1903. Other large barrages exist at Esna and Naga Hammadi on the main Nile, as well as the Delta Barrage, the Zifta Barrage and the Damietta Barrage on the Damietta branch and the Edfina barrage on the Rosetta branch of the Nile. Water also flows from the Nile to the Faiyum Oasis through a canal called Bahr Yussef that dates back to Pharaonic times. From the oasis it flows to the Birket Qarun (Lake Moesis). The Fresh Water Canal runs from Cairo to Ismailia and the Sweet Water Canal runs in parallel to the Suez Canal, supplying drinking water to the cities along the Canal. Both canals were completed in 1863. The Mahmoudiyah Canal links the Nile to Alexandria. Completed in 1820 it used to have an important role for navigation, but nowadays is used primarily for irrigation and to supply Alexandria with drinking water.

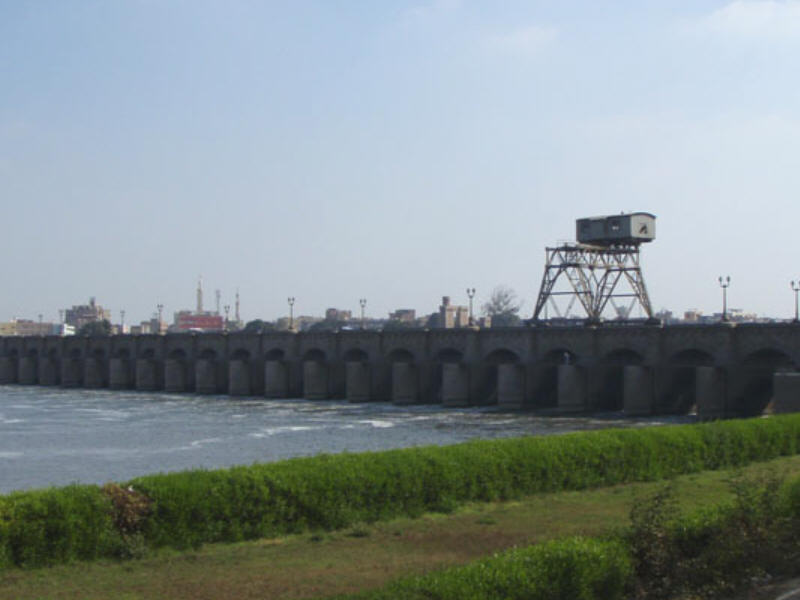
The Delta Barrage on the Damietta branch of the Nile (from downstream)

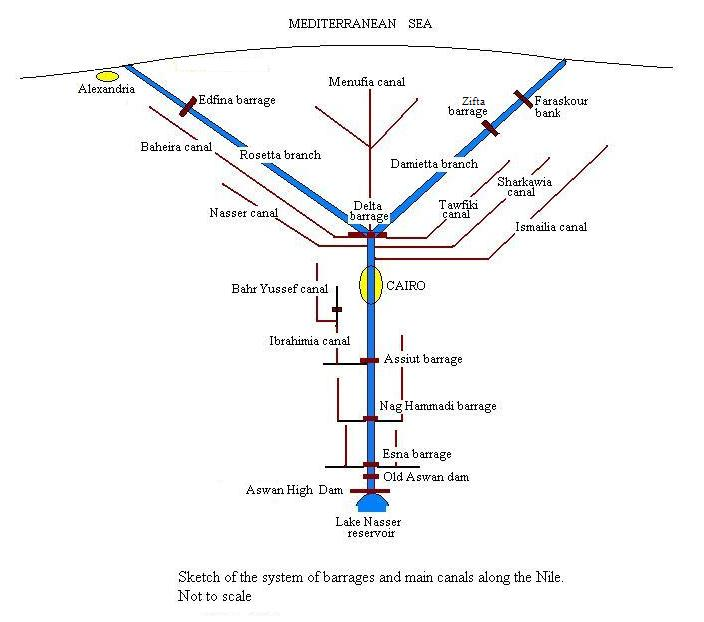
Main irrigation system (schematically)

Irrigation canals are classified into principal canals (Rayah), main canals (first level canals), branch canals (second level canals), distribution canals (mesqas, or third level canals) and irrigation ditches (Merwas). Flow in the principal and main canals is continuous; in the branch and distribution canals it is on a rotation basis. However, the government supports a process of converting some of the lower-level canals gradually to continuous flow. Farmers pump water from the mesqas to irrigate fields (lift: about 0.5–1.5 m). A mesqa typically serves an area of 50 to 200 feddan (20 to 80 hectares). In areas where there is no formal operational structure for proper water distribution, the tail-end users usually are not getting enough water to maintain crops. Water user associations have been formed beginning in the 1990s to better distribute water among farmers on a mesqa and to rationalize pumping, with the aim of reducing water abstraction, pumping costs and to increase yields.

In 1994 Egypt had approximately 30,000 km of public canals (first and second level), 17,000 km of public drains, 80,000 km of private third-level canals (mesqas) and irrigation ditches, 450,000 private water-lifting devices (sakias or pumps), 22,000 public water-control structures, and 670 large public pumping stations for irrigation.

Drainage through sub-surface drains and drainage channels is essential to prevent a deterioration of crop yields from soil salinization and waterlogging. By 2003 more than 2 million ha have been equipped with a subsurface drainage system and approximately 7.2 billion m^{3} of water is drained annually from areas with these systems. The total investment cost in agricultural drainage over 27 years from 1973 to 2002 was about 3.1 billion US$ covering the cost of design, construction, maintenance, research and training. During this period 11 large-scale projects were implemented with financial support from World Bank and other donors

=== Irrigation Improvement Program ===
Water savings in agriculture are an important objective of Egypt's water strategy to serve a growing population with limited resources. However, the magnitude of potential water savings in agriculture and how best to achieve such savings have been a subject of some debate. While "classical" field-level irrigation efficiencies may be low due to the predominance of flood irrigation, the overall system efficiency – the "effective irrigation efficiency" – is quite high due to return flows. Water savings strategies in Egypt therefore do not focus much on water-saving irrigation technologies such as sprinkler or drip irrigation. Instead, they are based on the observation that when farmers lack control of the timing and quantities of water supply, they irrigate too soon and apply too much water.

The feasibility of water savings in Egyptian agriculture was first assessed through pilot projects under the USAID-supported Egypt Water Use and Management Project (EWUP) begun in 1977. The pilots showed that to achieve water savings, it was important to allow farmers to participate more in irrigation management through water user associations, to provide continuous flow instead of rotational flow in mesqas, to replace individual by collective pumping, and to create an irrigation advisory service. The 1980 "Strategy for Irrigation Development in Egypt up to the year 2000" already envisaged the improvement of control and distribution of irrigation water as a first phase of the strategy. This was to be followed by the development of field irrigation systems and direct pricing of irrigation water. Based on the lessons of EWUP and the irrigation strategy the government set out the National Irrigation Improvement Program (IIP) in 1984, which was approved by the National Assembly in 1985. Its implementation began, again with support from USAID, in eleven pilot areas, beginning with the Serri Canal with 120,000 feddan (50,400 hectares) in Minya Governorate. The project replaced the old low-lying mesqas either with raised mesqas, from which water would flow to the fields via gravity, or with buried pressurized pipes. The value engineering techniques have been used to evaluate the optimum mesqa alternative targeting the minimum cost without affecting the quality of the alternative. By 1998 about 1,100 water user associations had been formed and systems irrigating 129,000 feddan had been modernized. The project reduced water losses, improved water quality at the tail end of mesqas, made more water available to farmers at the tail end of canals, saved land due to the smaller size of the new mesqas, reduced pumping costs by more than 50% and increased yields between 5% and 30%. Building on this success the concept of farmer participation in irrigation management was extended to branch canals with the creation of Branch Canal Water Users Association (BCWUAs) beginning in 1997 in Qemri, Bahr el Dahram and Balaqtar branch canals (Lower Egypt) and El Reity canal (Upper Egypt), as well as in Fayoum. This process was supported by two USAID-funded projects, the LIFE (Livelihood and Income from the Environment) project (2005–2008) and the Integrated Water Resources Management II project (2009–2012).

From 1996 onwards the World Bank and Germany's development bank KfW supported the IIP with the ultimate objective to increase agricultural production and income. As part of this project, 2,906 water user associations were created irrigating more than 200 thousand feddan (84,000 hectares) in the Western Delta (Mahmoudia) and the Northern Delta (Manaifa and Wasat). However, net revenues increased only by 6–9% due to reduced pumping costs compared to a target of 30%, so that the project was rated as "marginally satisfactory" by the World Bank in 2007.

Beginning in 1996 the government also initiated the creation of drainage user associations (DUAs) to manage drainage canals collectively. However, these associations remained marginal and apparently, farmers are not interested in organizing themselves in drainage matters only.

=== Mega projects to reclaim desert land ===
Three mega projects were initiated in the mid-1990s to irrigate so-called "new lands" outside the Nile Valley. From a hydrological point of view a key difference between new lands and old lands is that irrigation return flows from the new lands are not available further downstream, as it is the case for irrigation on the old lands in the Nile Valley.

==== The North Sinai Development Project ====
The North Sinai Development Project includes the Al-Salam Canal in front of Damietta Lock and Dam with the purpose of reclaiming 220 thousand feddan west of the Suez Canal, of which 180 thousand feddan are already irrigated. A siphon was built in 1997 under the Suez Canal to bring water to the Sinai through the Al-Sheikh Gaber Al-Sabah Canal to reclaim 400 thousand feddan east of the Suez Canal.

==== The New Valley Project ====
The New Valley Project, or Toshka project, is a system of canals around Sheikh Zayed Canal, fed from Lake Nasser through the Mubarak Pumping Station to irrigate 234,000 hectares in the Sahara. The project was begun in 1997, the pumping station was completed in 2003 and the entire project is scheduled to be completed before 2020. Private investors were supposed to complete the tertiary canals bringing water to the farmers. However, as of 2012 these investments significantly lagged behind, so that benefits from the project were much lower than expected.

==== The West Delta Project ====
The Infrastructure Project for Irrigation Improvement in the West Delta region aims to improve irrigation on 500 thousand feddan, reclamation of 170 thousand feddan and rehabilitation of infrastructure serving 250 thousand feddan. This project is a public-private partnership designed as a hybrid scheme based largely on the design-build-operate (DBO) model. Under this model a private operator would design and construct the system, and operate it for 30 years, including the associated demand and commercial risks. The public sector would own the assets finances the project. According to the World Bank, the decision process from design to execution involved users from the conception through a water user council. Revenues are supposed to come through a two-part tariff, consisting of a fixed fee based on the land area a volumetric fee based on water use. As of 2012, the new Egyptian government had frozen the project.

== Water resources ==
=== Current resources ===
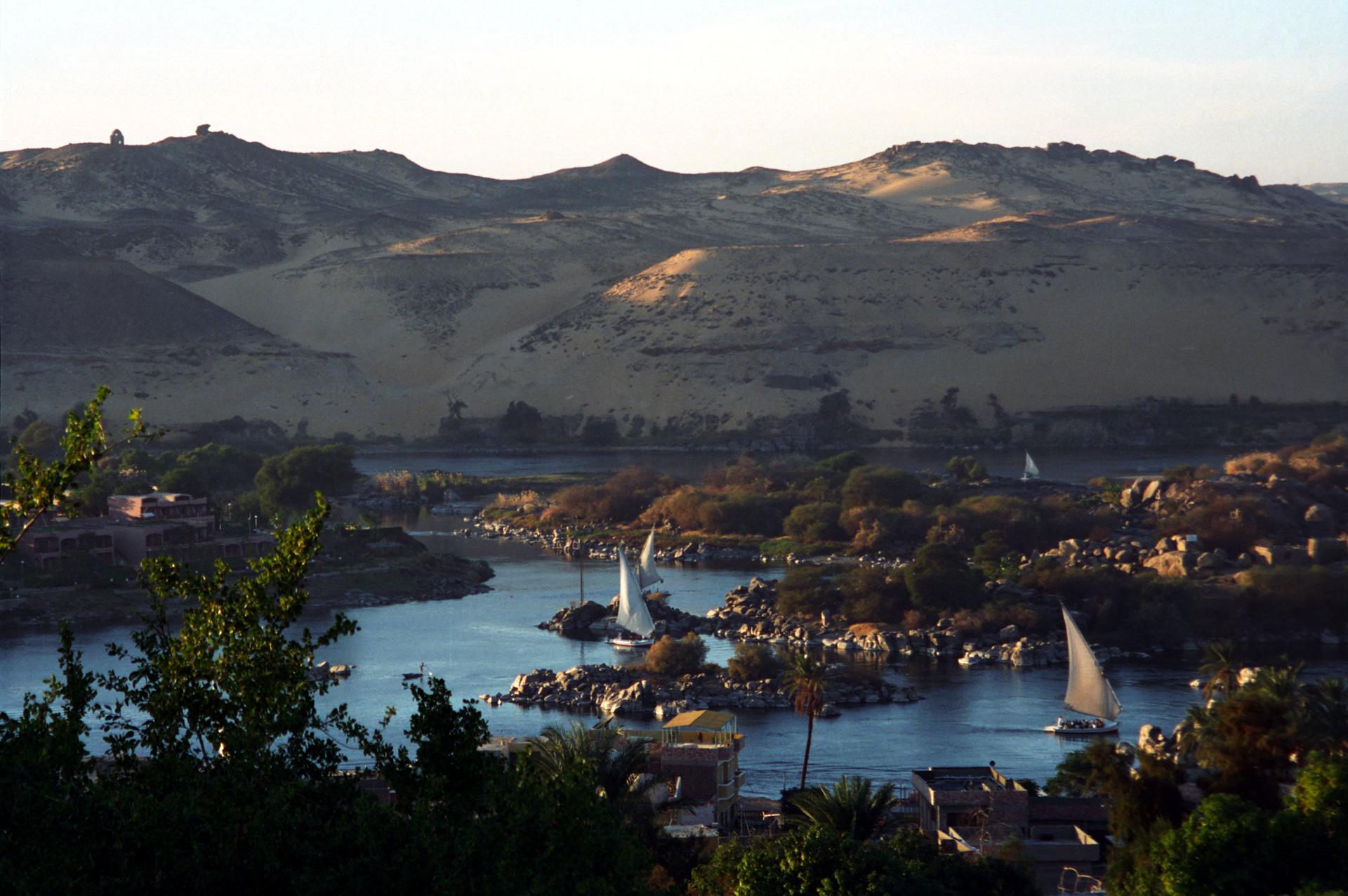
Feluccas on the Nile

Egypt depends for 97% of its water supply on the Nile. Rainfall is minimal at 18 mm per year, occurring mainly during autumn and winter time. The 1959 Nile waters treaty between Egypt and Sudan allocates 55.5 billion cubic meter of water per year to Egypt, without specifying any allocation for upstream riparians besides Sudan (18.5 billion cubic meters per year). Actual water use by Egypt is widely believed to be in excess of the allocation under the 1959 agreement. There is no water sharing agreement among all ten riparian countries of the Nile. However, the riparian countries cooperate through the Nile Basin Initiative.

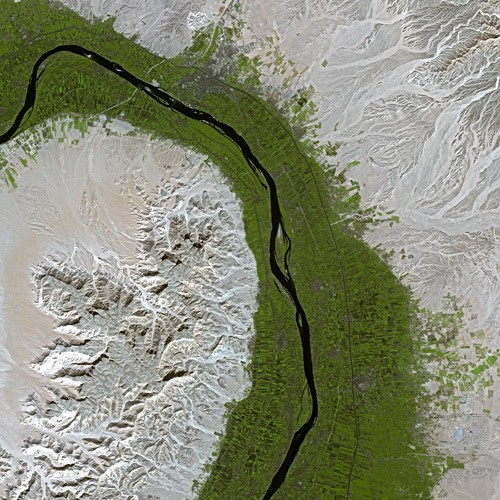
Satellite view of the Nile near Qena in Upper Egypt

Egypt has four main groundwater aquifers: the Nile Aquifer, the Nubian Sandstone Aquifer, the Moghra Aquifer between the West of the Nile Delta and the Qattara Depression, and coastal aquifers on the North-Western coast. The Nile Aquifer, the Moghra Aquifer and the Coastal Aquifer are renewable. The Nubian Sandstone Aquifer System which contains 150,000 billion m³ of freshwater, equivalent to almost 3,000 times the annual flow of the Nile, is non-renewable. It is shared with Sudan, Chad and Libya. Egypt's non-conventional water resources include agricultural sawage, salt water desalination, brackish water desalination and municipal wastewater reuse

Water Resources and Extraction in Egypt *)
Type of Water Resources	Quantity in billion m³ per year
Nile River	56.8
Precipitation	1.8
Fossil Groundwater Extraction	1
Sea Water Desalination	0.1
Sum	59.7
Reuse of Spilled Water Resources *)
Renewable Groundwater Extraction	2.3
Wastewater Reuse	2.9
Agricultural Drainage Reuse	7.5
Sum	12.7

*) See also: Irrigation from the Aswan dam for agriculture and the water flow chart

=== Future resources ===
It is forecasted that in 2025 the population of Egypt will increase to about 90 million from about 75 million in 2008, leading to a decrease in per capita water availability from 800 to 600 m^{3} per year assuming that total water availability remains constant. Developments in Sudan, Ethiopia or other riparian countries could reduce water availability to Egypt, for example through increased abstractions for irrigation. However, they could also increase water availability, for example through the draining of swamps such as the Sudd where large amounts of water currently evaporate.

So in conclusion, climate change is likely to affect water availability to Egypt, although the direction of change is uncertain. According to Nahla Abou El-Fotouh of the National Water Research Centre (NWRC) "Some experts say that there will be water increase with more rainfall from the Ethiopian plateau, and some say there will be a decrease because of water evaporation.". According to Mohamed al-Raey, a professor of environmental studies at Alexandria University, some studies foresee a decline of up to 70 percent in Nile water availability, while other studies project an increase in Nile water levels by 25 percent

Seawater desalination, which already is used in some resorts on the Red Sea, is also likely to become an increasingly important source for municipal water supply in coastal areas of Egypt. For example, in October 2009 the West Delta Electricity Production Company awarded a contract for a power plant with a 10,000 m^{3}/day seawater desalination plant near Alexandria. Brackish water desalination for irrigation may also become more important.

=== Impact of sea level rise in the Nile Delta ===
The Intergovernmental Panel on Climate Change (IPCC) expects the sea level to rise by up to 98 cm in the worst of all considered scenarios, and by 28 cm in the most benign scenario, by 2100. According to studies quoted by the IPCC, climate change could lead to the loss of a "sizable proportion of the northern part of the Nile delta" to "a combination of inundation and erosion". A 0.5-m rise in sea level would lead to estimated losses of land, installations, and tourism of more than US$32.5 billion in the Governorate of Alexandria alone, cutting off the city of Alexandria from the Delta. Erosion already increased in the Nile Delta since the construction of the Aswan High Dam in the 1970s which trapped much of the Nile sediments. Furthermore, agricultural land losses will occur as a result of soil salinization.

The extent of vulnerability of the Nile delta to increases in sea level varies. One study estimates that 30% of the Delta and Alexandria coast is vulnerable, 55% is "invulnerable" and 15% was artificially protected in 2003. High-risk areas in and near the Delta include parts of Alexandria, Behaira, Damietta and Port Said governorates. According to Omran Frihy, a retired coastal researcher, authorities are spending US$300 million to build concrete sea walls to protect the beaches of Alexandria. Sand is being dumped in some areas to replenish dwindling beaches.

According to a report in The Guardian, some senior Egyptian environmental officials do not believe climate change is real or are convinced the problem is so great that human intervention is useless.

== Water use ==
Water use allocation in Egypt

The main water-using sector in Egypt is agriculture, followed by municipal and industrial uses. Total water withdrawal in 2000 was estimated at 68.3 km3.

=== Agriculture and reuse of drainage water ===
Data on agricultural water use in Egypt are not precise and often contradictory. The total area equipped for irrigation was 3.4 million hectares in 2002; 85 percent of this area is in the Nile Valley and Delta. Agriculture used about 59 km3 of freshwater in 2000 (86 percent of total use). All drainage water in Upper Egypt, south of Cairo, flows back into the Nile and the irrigation canals; this amount is estimated at 4 km3/yr. Drainage water in the Nile Delta is estimated at 14 km3/yr. As mentioned below about 10 km3/year of drainage water in the Delta that originates from freshwater is being pumped to the sea. Reuse of drainage water occurs in three different ways:

- Official reuse through public pumping stations that pump water from drains to irrigation canals. This accounts for about 4.5 BCM/year in the Delta and 0.9 BCM/year in Upper Egypt and Faiyoum.
- Unofficial reuse done by farmers themselves when they are short of canal water. In the Delta alone this has been estimated to be around 2.8 BCM/year.
- Indirect reuse from drains in Upper Egypt that discharge into the Nile, amounting to about 4 BCM/year.

=== Municipal and industrial use ===
5.3 km3 of water was used for municipal uses (8 percent) and 4.0 km3 by industry (6 percent). It has been estimated that about 3.5 BCM/year of municipal wastewater was being discharged into the Nile and the sea in 2002, out of which only 1.6 BCM/year (about 45%) were treated. Industrial effluents contribute to about 1.3 BCM/yr of wastewater being discharged to surface waters, only some of which is being treated.

=== Other uses ===
Hydropower. An important use of water in Egypt is for the production of hydropower. This use is non-consumptive and is thus available for other uses further downstream. Hydropower plants exist at the Aswan High Dam (2100 MW), the old Aswan Dam (270 MW)and power plants at the Esna (90 MW) and Naga Hammadi weirs (64 MW). Together these plants accounted for 16% of installed electricity generation capacity in 2004. The share of hydropower in power generation declines since the hydropower potential is largely exploited and power demand increases rapidly.

Navigation. The Nile is also important for navigation, especially for tourism, which makes it necessary to maintain a minimum flow of the Nile year-round.

Ecology. Last but not least the Nile River also has ecological functions that require minimum flows to be maintained, especially for the brackish lakes in the Delta (see below under biodiversity).

Discharge to the sea. Drainage water that is too saline to be used for agriculture is discharged from drainage canals in the Delta to the sea and the northern lakes via drainage pump stations. The total amount of drainage water that was pumped to the sea in 1995/96 has been estimated at 12.4 BCM. This includes about 2.0 BCM/year of seawater that seeps into the drains in the Delta.

== Environmental aspects ==
=== Surface water quality ===
Water quality in the Nile deteriorates along the course of the river. Lake Nasser has good water quality with only small organic substance concentrations, which makes its water a reference point for water quality along the river and its branches. According to reports by the Egyptian Environmental Affairs Agency, in 2007 average organic loads in 11 governorates along the Nile remained below the allowed limit of 6 mg/liter of biological oxygen demand (BOD). This is due to the high self-assimilation capacity of the Nile. However, in the same year chemical oxygen demand was above the allowed limit of 10 mg/liter in 7 of 11 governorates.

According to a detailed study undertaken in 2002 by a research team working for the Ministry of Water and Irrigation and USAID the water quality of the Nile River was good despite high organic loads discharged from some of the drains and industrial activities. Water contamination is worst in drainage canals (drains), particularly in all drains in the Delta and some drains in Upper Egypt. The study ranks water pollutants according to their severity to public health and the environment: Pathogenic microorganisms are ranked first, followed by organic compounds. Pesticides and heavy metals are ranked third, while noting that very little information is available to quantify the magnitude of the problem.

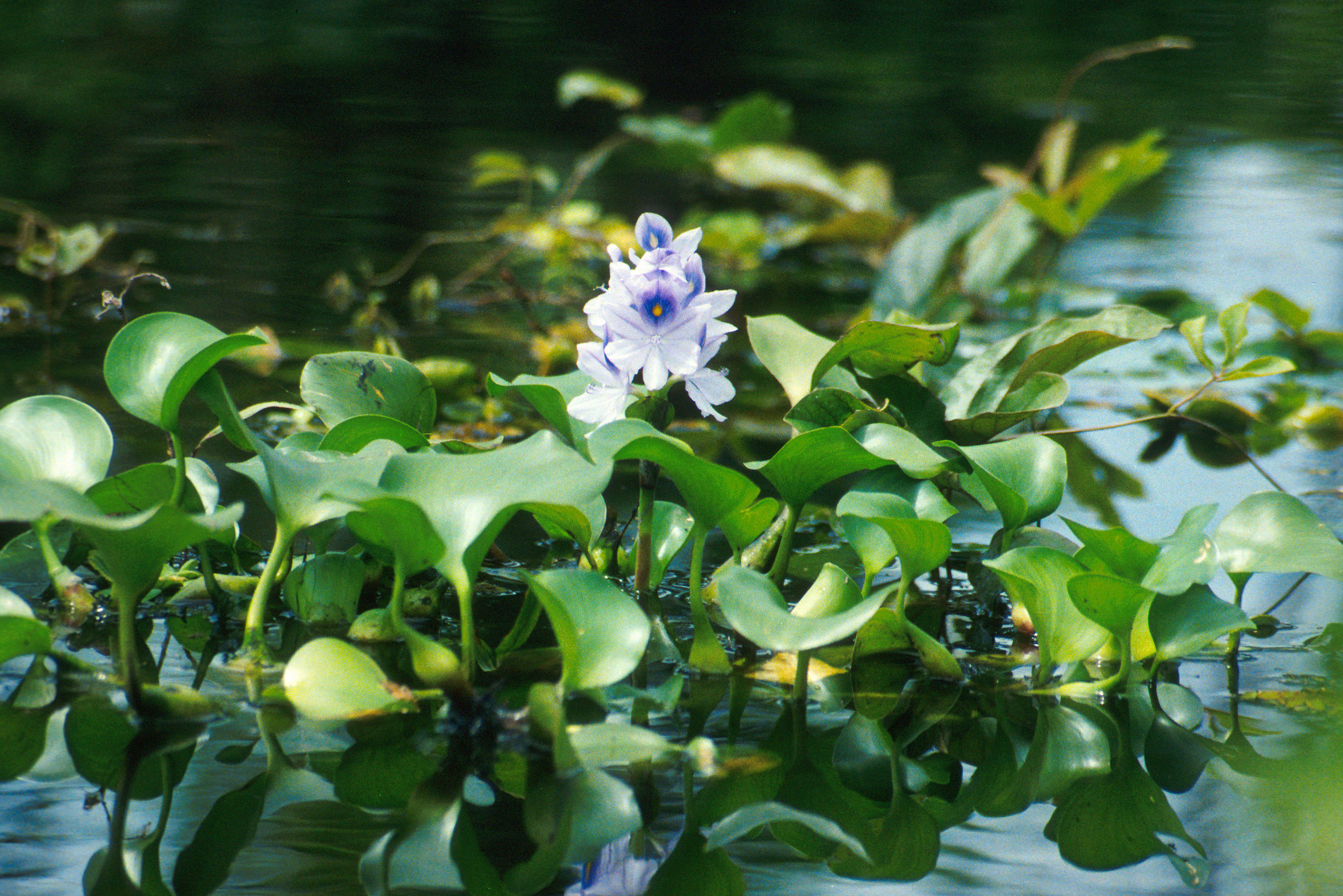
Water hyacinths clog irrigation and drainage canals and are being combated with mechanical and biological technologies

Nitrogen fertilizers whose consumption has doubled between 1980 and 1993 present another source of pollution. Water hyacinth flourishing at the downstream of water ways due to increased nutrients lead to clogging of canals. It is combated with mechanical and biological technologies.

Salinity is another important water quality issue. Drainage return flows to the Nile result in an increase in salinity of the water from 250 ppm (mg/L) at Aswan to 2,700 ppm at the Delta barrages. However, more salts are being discharged into the Mediterranean Sea than are entering at Aswan (see Irrigation for agriculture in Egypt) so that in the long run the salinity of the water at the Delta barrages could decrease. However, saline groundwater of marine origin enters the Delta through pumping of brackish water and upwelling in lakes and drains, thus counterbalancing this effect.

=== Biodiversity ===
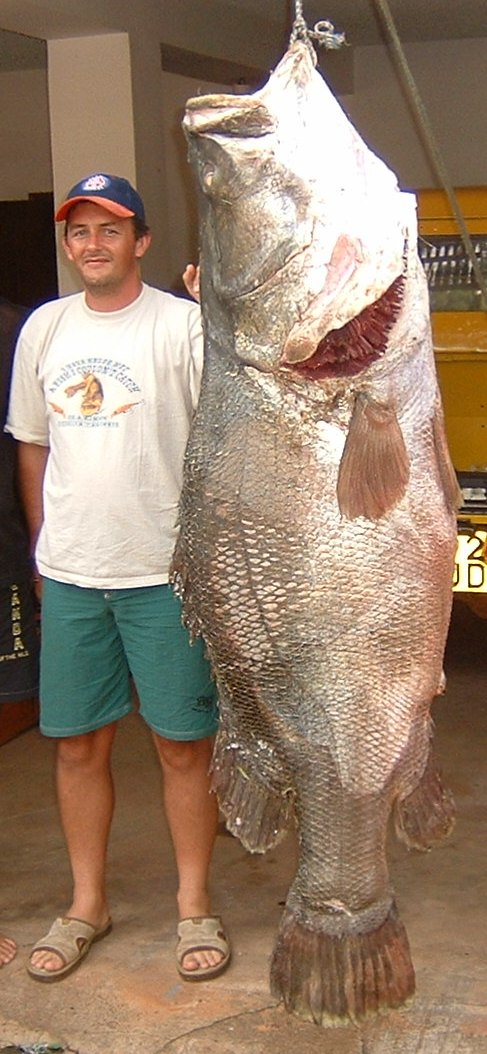
Nile perches are found in Lake Nasser and in Lake Mariout in the Nile Delta.

The Northern Lakes of Egypt are important to preserve biodiversity. From west to east the lakes in the Nile Delta are Lake Mariout south of Alexandria, Lake Edku east of Alexandria, Lake Burullus east of Rosetta and Lake Manzala between Damietta and Port Said. Another important Northern Lake is Lake Bardawil in northern Sinai that is not fed by the Nile. Several hundred thousand water birds winter in these lakes, including the world's largest concentrations of little gulls and whiskered terns. Other birds making their homes in the delta include grey herons, Kentish plovers, shovelers and cormorants. Also found are egrets and ibises. Lake Bardawil and Lake Burullus are protected wetlands of international importance under the Ramsar Convention. Despite the flourishing fish production in Egypt, only 17 species remain as of 1995 out of 47 species in 1948. The Nile perch is one of the more prominent fish species in the Egyptian Nile. It is found in Lake Nasser and in Lake Mariout in the Nile Delta. Other fish found in the delta include the striped mullet and soles. Other animals found in the delta include frogs, turtles, tortoises, mongooses, and the Nile monitor.

Lake Manzala, which used to be a significant source of inexpensive fish for human consumption in Egypt, has been affected by pollution and reduced water inflow. In 1985 the lakes fishery was an open area of 89,000 ha and employed roughly 17,000 workers. The government drained substantial portions of the lake in an effort to convert its rich Nile deposits to farmland. The project was unprofitable: crops did not grow well in the salty soil and the value of resulting produce was less than the market value of the fish that the reclaimed land had formerly yielded. By 2001, Lake Manzala had lost approximately 80 percent of its former area through the effects of drainage efforts.

=== Groundwater quality ===
Groundwater is contaminated from nitrogen and fertilisers (the use of which has quadrupled between 1960 and 1988) and the impact of pesticide and herbicide use, the latter being used to control weeds in canals. Shallow aquifers, in particular in the Nile Delta, are often heavily contaminated.

=== Health impact ===
In villages where the only available water is from irrigation canals, water is used for domestic purposes and dumped back into the drains. Villagers drinking polluted water have been affected with kidney and liver diseases. The northeast Nile Delta region has a high incident rate of pancreatic cancer that is believed to be from high levels of heavy metals and organochlorine pesticides found in the soil and water. Exposure to cadmium may be from heavy metals and pesticides found in the water. The water exceeds the European Community Standards of fecal contamination and there is a high salinization and saline intrusion in the delta. Schistosomiasis has been found in irrigation canals along with benthic cyanobacteria forming mats. Microbiological contamination of water includes fecal coliform bacteria pathogens include hookworms and other intestinal helminth eggs.

== Legal and institutional framework ==
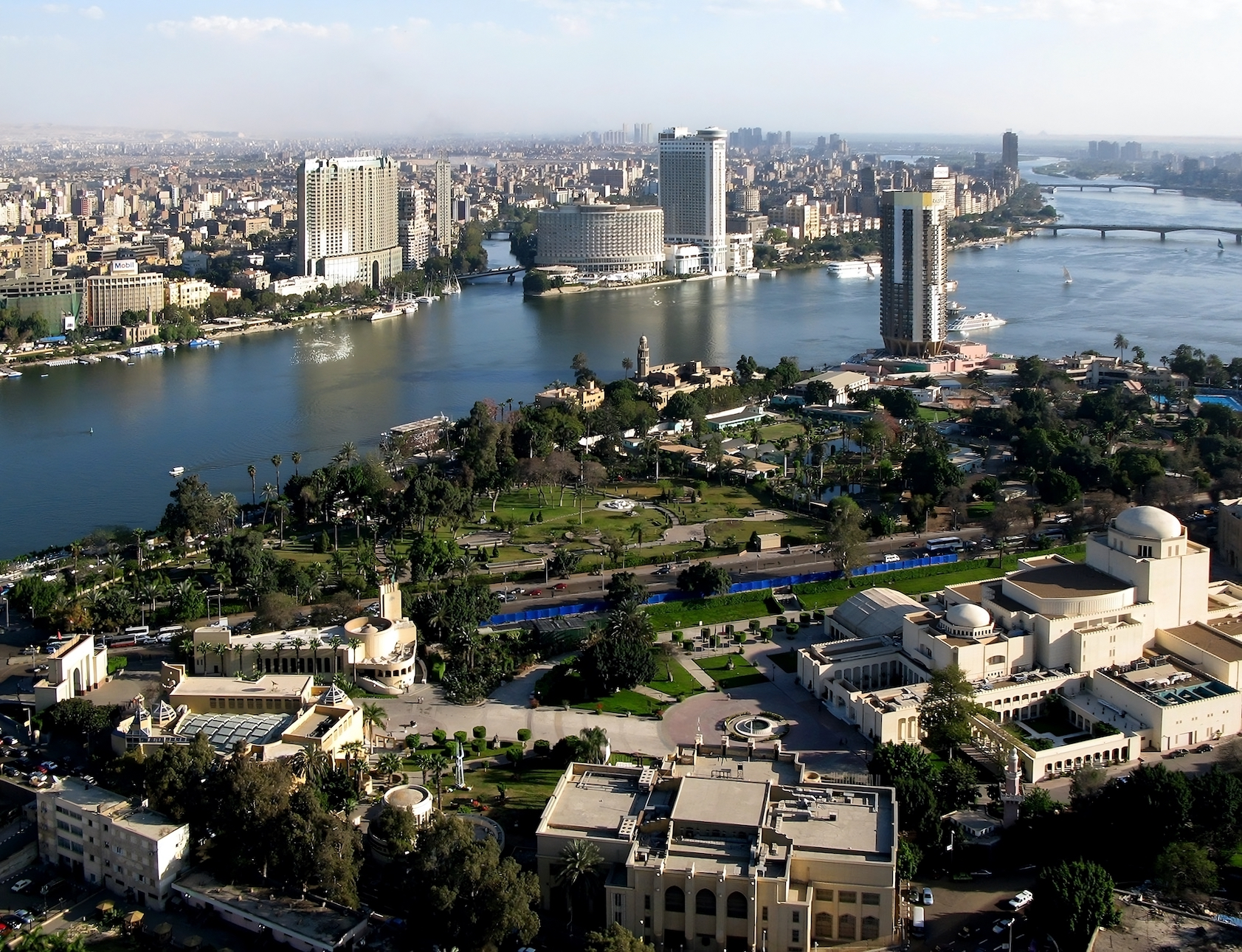
The Nile in Cairo, Egypt's capital city where key institutions responsible for water management in Egypt are located

=== Legal framework ===
There is no single overarching water resources law in Egypt. The main laws of relevance for water resources management include laws about irrigation and drainage on the one hand, and laws to protect the environment on the other hand. Among the irrigation and drainage laws are:

- Law 12 for the year 1984 for the Irrigation and drainage, and
- Law 213 for the year 1994 for farmer participation and cost sharing.

Among the laws and decrees for environmental protection are:

- Law 93 for the year 1962 for the discharge to open streams and its modifications for the years 1962, 1982, and 1989,
- Law 27 for the year 1978 for the regulation of water resources and treatment of wastewater,
- Law 48 for the year 1982 Regarding the protection of the River Nile and waterways from pollution,
- Law 4 for the year 1994 for Environment Protection.

=== Key institutions ===
Several ministries are involved in water resources management in Egypt. The Ministry of Water Resources and Irrigation (MWRI) plays a key role. It is in charge of development and management of water resources, and operating and maintaining dams, weirs, irrigation canals and drainage canals. It also monitors water quality. The Ministry of Agriculture and Land Reclamation (MALR) is involved in improving agricultural activities and land reclamation, including water management at the on-farm level. The Ministry of Water Supply and Sanitation Facilities (MWSSF) provides water supply and sanitation services. The Ministry of Health and Population (MoHP), the Ministry of State for Environmental Affairs (MSEA) together with the Egyptian Environmental Affairs Agency (EEAA), and the Ministry of Local Development (MoLD) also have specific roles in the sector.

The important task of water quality monitoring is shared among MWRI, MoHP and MSEA. Each of the three Ministries has its own monitoring sites along the Nile and canals. Groundwater quality is monitored exclusively by MWRI. In addition, three institutes within the National Water Research Center monitor water quality. According to a UN report "Despite the multiplicity of (water quality monitoring) programmes, they have sometimes lacked accurate information and have not been linked up". To improve the quality of monitoring and reporting, Egypt has received support from the Canadian Association for Environmental Analytical Laboratories. Furthermore, a water quality unit has been established, which gathers water quality data from various sections of MWRI and other ministries and collects them in a database with "more than 40 indicators and covering more than 435 sites".

To ensure co-ordination among Ministries involved in water resources there are several committees, including the Supreme Committee of the Nile, headed by the Minister of Water and Irrigation, the Committee for Land Reclamation and the Inter-Ministerial Committee on Water Planning. The latter was established in 1977 as part of the Master Water Plan project.

The following authorities operate under MWRI:

- The Egyptian Public Authority for the High Dam and Aswan Reservoir is responsible for operation of the Aswan High Dam.
- The Egyptian Public Authority for Drainage Projects (EPADP) is responsible for the construction and maintenance of drains.
- The Egyptian Public Authority for Shore Protection, also called Shore Protection Authority (SPA), is responsible for the planning of shore protection activities.
- The National Water Research Center comprises 12 institutes and is the scientific body of MWRI for all aspects related to water resources management.

=== National water planning ===
The concept of formal long-term national water resources planning was introduced in Egypt through foreign technical assistance during the 1970s. In 1981 a Master Plan for Water Resources Development and Use was finalized with the support of UNDP and the World Bank. Rather than being an actual plan, the document aimed at introducing planning tools such as databases and flow models that would allow better planning. In subsequent years a number of events increased water scarcity. These include a drought in 1979–88; cessation in 1983 of construction works on the Jonglei Canal in Sudan; and a revitalization of a land reclamation program, requiring one billion m3 of additional water each year. These events helped trigger a greater emphasis on integrated long-term water planning. In 1990 the government adopted its first national water plan covering the period until 2000. Under the plan the government stopped releases of water from Lake Nasser that was only destined for power generation. It also decided to replace old barrages with new ones and it launched the National Irrigation Improvement Program. Furthermore, it aimed to increase the re-use of drainage water and the use of groundwater. On the demand side, water release to the sea at times of low water demand in winter for the sole purpose of maintaining navigation and to regulate sea water intrusion in the Delta was to be reduced. During the period of the plan land reclamation was to continue at a rate of 60,000 hectares per year. The Plan assumed that the Jonglei Canal would be built by 2000. Some elements of the plan were implemented. Others – such as the Jonglei Canal – did not materialize or were delayed, such as the Irrigation Improvement Program.

Beginning in 1998 the Dutch government provided technical assistance to prepare a second national water plan. The National Water Resources Plan (NWRP) was completed in 2003 with a time horizon until 2017. The plan, which is not publicly available, is based on four principles: to develop additional resources, make better use of existing resources, protect public health and the environment, and improve institutional arrangements. According to the FAO the plan includes both "vertical expansion" through more efficient water use and increased agricultural productivity and "horizontal expansion" by increasing the existing agricultural area of 7.8 million feddan (about 3.12 million ha) by an additional 1.4 million feddan (about 560 000 ha). In June 2005 the Ministry presented an Integrated Water Resources Management Plan, which was prepared with technical assistance from the World Bank, as a "transitional strategy including further reform interventions" building on the NWRP. The Plan, which reads more like a World Bank report than a report by the Egyptian government, includes 39 actions in the fields of institutional reform and strengthening, policies and legislation, physical interventions, capacity building, technological and information systems, water quality, economic and financial framework, research, raising awareness, monitoring and evaluation and transboundary cooperation. The physical interventions mentioned include irrigation improvement and rural sanitation without mentioning the government's mega-projects that are at the heart of Egypt's actual water policy.

== External cooperation ==
External cooperation has played an important role in shaping Egypt's modern water resources management through both investment financing and technical assistance.

Concerning investment financing, the Soviet Union financed the Aswan High Dam during the 1960s. After Egypt opened itself to the West in the 1970s, the United States, various European countries and the World Bank provided major investment financing for water supply and sanitation and for irrigation and drainage. The Gulf countries partially financed mega-projects to develop new lands for irrigation in the New Valley (supported by the United Arab Emirates) and in Northern Sinai (supported by Kuwait and Saudi Arabia). Concerning technical assistance, the Netherlands, the World Bank and UNDP played important roles in supporting successive national water master plans since the 1980s. UNDP and the National Water Research Center have developed a computer-supported Decision Support System for Water Resources, which can produce various climate change scenarios for the Nile basin and therefore help to improve water resource planning and management. USAID provided substantial support to improve irrigation infrastructure and to support water user associations. With support by USAID a layer of management – the Inspectorate level – was stripped from the MWRI administrative system, different chains of command were brought together in the form of Integrated Water Management Districts (IWMDs), and Branch Canal Water User Associations were established across around 40% of the irrigated area of Egypt.

As of 2012, donors and the government worked on a Joint Integrated Sector Approach (JISA) based on the National Water Resources Plan to better coordinate the efforts from various donors, particularly in irrigation.

== See also ==
- Egyptian Public Works
- Water supply and sanitation in Egypt
- Aswan Dam § Irrigation scheme
- The National Water Research Center (Egypt)
