= The National Water Research Center (Egypt) =

Research institute in Egypt

A concrete canal developed by the research center as a demonstration project northwest of Cairo in the 1970s.

NWRC serves the Ministry of Water Resources and Irrigation (Egypt) (MWRI) to advance and expedite the implementation of the national water policy. As a MWRI research and development arm, NWRC coordinates and conducts basic and applied research to identify, characterize, and quantify water-related problems in Egypt. For these problems NWRC is mandated to provide innovative solutions and communicate them to the end users; therefore, enhance research uptake. Its role as a national organization goes beyond the MWRI; it assists the other ministries as well as the private sector facing water related problems through facilitated access to interdisciplinary expertise.

NWRC's organization consists of 12 research institutes; basically tackling the following water resources related fields: Irrigation and Drainage, Hydraulics, Hydraulic Structures and Machinery, Surface and Groundwater Hydrology, Sediment Transport, Water Quality and Pollution Control, Coastal Protection and Lake/Shore Environment, Climate Change and Geo-Measurements Analysis, Water Socio-Economics.

== Water Management Research Institute (WMRI) ==
The Water Management Research Institute focuses on the drawing policies that regulate the efficient use of water resources regardless of climatic conditions.

=== Research Areas ===
- Irrigation Scheduling
- Optimal agriculture water allocation and distribution
- Socioeconomic impact of irrigation systems
- Assessment of performance indicators of irrigation schemes

== Drainage Research Institute (DRI) ==
The DRI's mission is to carry out research in support of national plans for development of land drainage in Egypt. This subsequently results in implementation of drainage systems that are not only effective but also economically sound.

=== Research areas ===
- Functional design criteria of tile drainage network
- Testing and evaluating new technologies and materials utilized in field drainage networks
- Socioeconomic impacts of field drainage networks
- Development of guidelines for the reuse of marginal water in agriculture
- Improvement of open drains self-purification capacity

Water Resources Research Institute (WRRI)

The Institute covers the research areas of:

- Hydrologic analysis of Wadi Systems and flash floods
- Optimal design criteria for flash flood control structures and drainage networks
- Impacts of Nile socioeconomic development on inflow to Lake Nasser
- Optimal National Water Resources development strategy

== Channel Maintenance Research Institute (CMRI) ==
The role of the CMRI is to devise solutions of managing open waterways for the ministry.

=== Research Areas ===
- Recovery of water courses to avoid problems at channel tail ends.
- Designing programs for the running and maintenance of national major projects that have to do with hydraulic performance, management of aquatic weeds and movement of sand dunes.
- Coming up with most suitable solutions for procedures required for maintenance of open channels.

== See also ==
- Water resources management in modern Egypt
- Water supply and sanitation in Egypt
