= Egyptian Public Works =

The Egyptian Department of Public Works was established in the early 19th century, and concentrates mainly on public works relating to irrigation and hydraulic engineering. These irrigation projects have constituted the bulk of work performed by this entity in Egypt. During its almost 200-year history, the Egyptian Department of Public Works employed many notable engineers and constructed massive public works projects throughout the country. It became the most respected engineering entity and was regarded as the 'best school' for civil engineers in modern Egypt. Its history can be broken into three periods:

1. The Classic Period (1818–1882).
2. The Occupation Period (1882–1952).
3. The Modern Period (1952 to present).

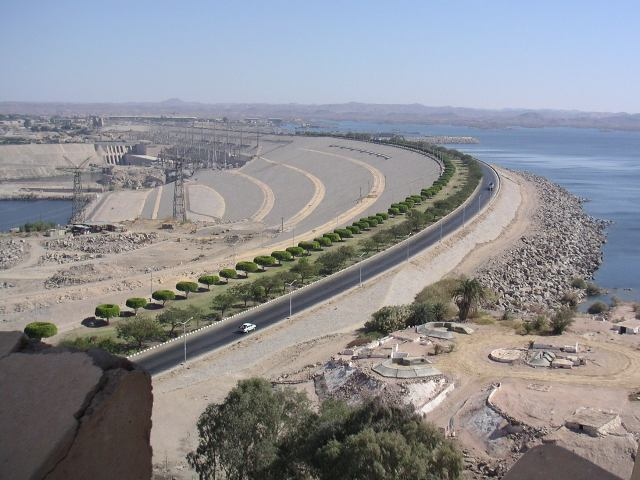
Aswan High Dam, crown jewel of the Egyptian Public Works

== The Classic Period (1818–1882) ==
This period was characterized by the strong influence of French engineers and/or French educated Egyptian engineers. Numerous public works projects were constructed in both Upper and Lower Egypt during this period, but the most notable of these were the construction of the three major irrigation canals (Mahmoudiyah, Ismailia, and Ibrahimiya) and the Delta Barrages.

=== Early Beginnings under Muhammad Ali ===
After his rise to power in 1805, Muhammad Ali Pasha embarked on consolidating his power and building an empire. His way of achieving that was to modernize Egypt and to build a European style strong army and a modern system of government. His desire for modernization fueled many new establishments such as the first modern military school, educational institutions, hospitals, roads and canals, factories to turn out uniforms and munitions, and a shipbuilding foundry at Alexandria. He established the school of Engineering (Mohandes Khana) in 1820 to provide the engineers and scientists he would need to carry out all the great projects he had planned. Impressed by the scientific and cultural aspects of the French Expedition (1798–1801), Muhammad Ali relied on French scientists and craftsmen to help him modernize Egypt. French engineer Pascal Coste was the first engineer hired by Muhammad Ali in 1817 to help him construct his ambitious projects. Coste worked on some small projects first, then came his biggest when he was appointed by Muhammad Ali as the Chief Engineer for Lower Egypt. This was the highest engineering post in Egypt at the time since most of Muhammad Ali's work to improve irrigation was concentrated in this region of the Nile Delta. Under his new position, Coste started working on constructing the Mahmoudiyah canal, the first of a long list of great irrigation projects that were to be constructed in that era.

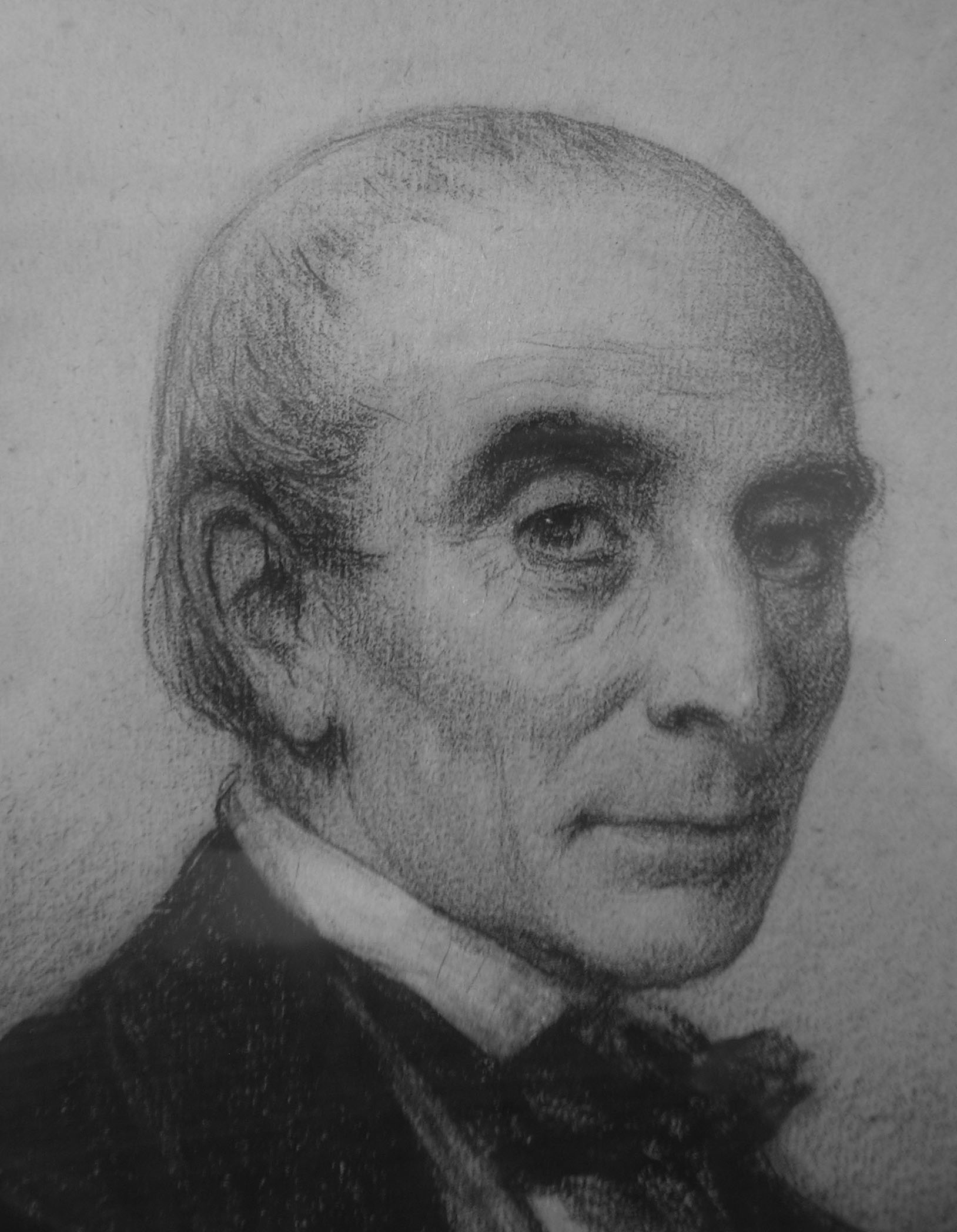
French engineer Pascal Coste (1787–1879). First Chief Engineer for Lower Egypt (1819–1829)

==== The Mahmoudiyah Canal ====
Around 1818, Muhammad Ali conceived the idea of digging a canal that would allow the barges bringing cargoes from Upper, Middle and Lower Egypt to reach Alexandria without passing Rosetta and the mouth of the river, a point where many ships sank due to the turbulence of the waters. He chose a Turkish engineer, Shakir Effendi, to be in charge of the design and execution of the work. The canal would begin in the village of Atfa, below Fuwwa; would be a little over 80-kilometer (50 mi) long. Shakir Effendi seems to have bungled his assignment, and was replaced by the French engineer Pascal Coste (1787–1879) who completed the canal in a record time of few months in 1820. This canal, which linked the Nile with the city's western harbor, gave Alexandria access to the Egyptian heartland and put Egypt face to face with the sea. It also provided Alexandria with Nile's fresh water for the first time in history.

It should be mentioned here however that the entire canal was constructed using the hated corvée system, which Muhammad Ali and his successors used extensively and which was finally abolished under Khedive Ismail during the digging of the Suez Canal. Corvée of more than 300,000 men were drafted from every part of Egypt to dig the Mahmoudiya canal, which was of very little importance to cultivation, and which was especially designed for the benefit of the city of Alexandria.

==== The Delta Barrages ====
With the great expansion of commercial cotton and sugarcane cultivation, river banks were initially raised and strengthened to protect summer crops from flood water. In the Nile Delta old canals were deepened and small weirs built across them to raise the water level. But this was an enormous undertaking, and since the canals were badly laid out and graded they became full of mud during flood season and required to be continually re-excavated. Muhammad Ali Pasha was then advised to raise the water surface by erecting a dam (or, as the French called it, a barrage) across the apex of the Nile Delta, twelve miles (19 km) north of Cairo.

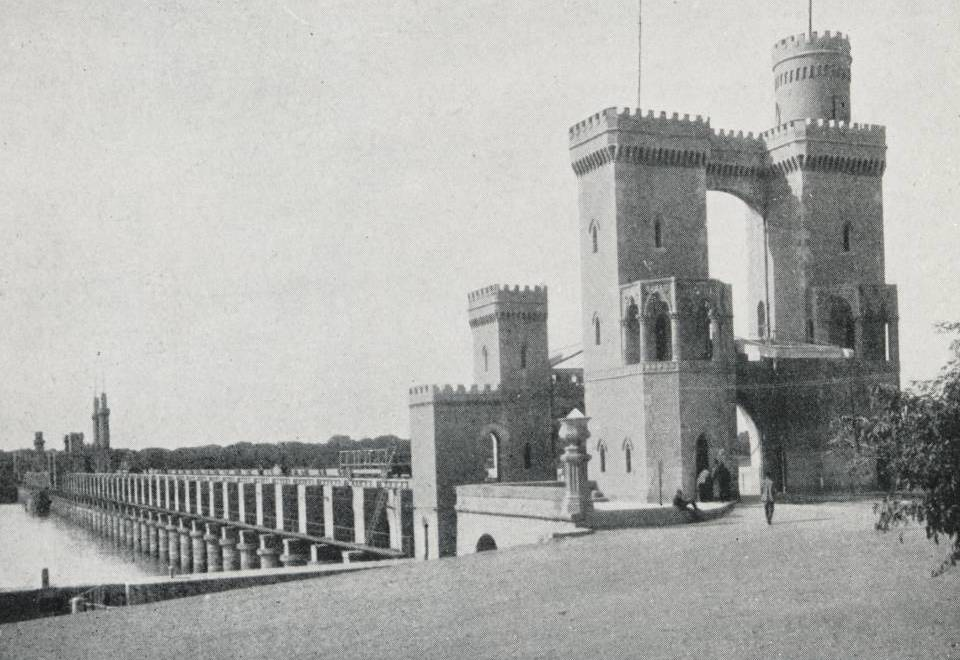
Nile Barrage in 1906, with its distinctive architecture

In 1843 the foundations were laid for the two great barrages across the Rosetta and Damietta branches of the Nile at the point where they divide north of Cairo. The project engineer was the French engineer Mougel Bey, whose objective was to regulate the entire hydraulic system of the Nile Delta. While initially unsuccessful, the two barrages would ultimately permit conversion of over 754,000 acres (3,050 km^{2}) of the Nile Delta from seasonal basin irrigation to perennial irrigation; the increased availability of water lengthened the dry summer growing season, and dramatically increased agricultural output. But this massive work proved to be very costly and impinged upon engineering's state of the art. Construction took nearly 20 years and consumed untold wealth. The Rosetta section was 465 meters in length with 61 arches containing sluices, each of five meters in width. The Damietta section was 535 meters long with 71 arches containing similarly sized sluices. Navigation locks were provided on both branches, and the two barrages were joined by an elevated roadway 8.6 meters wide, with drawbridges over the locks. Elaborate fortifications with towers and turrets completed the imposing structure.

By the time the barrages were finally completed in 1862, during the early reign of Viceroy Ismail Pasha (not yet khedive of Egypt), 3 million Egyptian pounds had been spent already. When it was time to operate the dam, the foundations had been so poorly laid that the whole purpose for which it had been built in the first place was abandoned. Poorly constructed, the barrages would have to be rebuilt during the British occupation. A more technical and specific description, some years later says: "When the work was subjected to a small head in 1863 and 1867, unmistakable signs of failure appeared in the form of cracks and displacements, and the barrage was forthwith put upon the sick list. The failure was due to "piping." Runs below the floor were developed under the influence of the head of water, and the sand of the foundation bed was carried away by the flowing water till the floor lost its support and settled down. The defects arose, not so much from faulty design, as from careless construction of the foundations. Worried by the impatience and impetuosity of the Viceroy, Mougel Bey's workmen laid the foundation concrete in running water, which carried away the mortar and left loose stone, without any binding material, through which the springs of the river bed had free passage. The design, if faithfully executed, was not much at fault. The floor was amply strong to resist the upward pressure due to the head, but its breadth was perhaps deficient; and the protection given both on the upper and lower sides of the flooring was inadequate. From 1867 to 1883 the barrage attracted attention by reason only of its imposing superstructure, but it failed to produce any impression by its performances, for it was weakest where strength was most needed."

Following the British occupation, engineers decided if any good could be done, they must either repair the old barrage, or build a new one; it was absolutely necessary to get control of the Nile water and thus improve irrigation and exports. They resolved to see what the cracked dam was worth, quite literally. In 1884, with initial safety testing, immediate repairs, and controlled filling, the existing structure held a pool about seven feet above the natural level. The cost to this work, totaled £26,000; the increased water provided to canals produced 30,000 tons more cotton than the previous year, which was worth over £1 million. This was so encouraging that, the following year, Lord Cromer, despite the state of finances, provided £1 million to improve Egypt's irrigation works. Between 1885 and 1890, Sir Colin Scott-Moncrieff successfully completed repairs of the barrages at a cost of $2.5 million; it provided a maintainable and desired depth of eight feet of water on downstream parts of the Nile. Maintenance and continuing repair of the Delta Barrages for irrigation purposes would continue into the mid-1930s.

==== Establishment of the Department ====
Up until construction of the Nile Barrages, no formal single entity was responsible for the execution of all public works that were being constructed in many parts of the Nile valley and the Nile Delta. Muhammad Ali had invented a new position in 1818: Chief Engineer for Lower Egypt (Pascal Coste was the first ever to be chosen for this position). A similar title for Upper Egypt was created in 1831 after Muhammad Ali started to consider building irrigation improvements in Upper Egypt. Linant de Bellefonds (another French engineer) was appointed the first chief engineer for Upper Egypt. Pascal Coste quit his position and returned to France in 1829 and was replaced by his fellow countryman Mougel Bey. As the volume of public works increased, Muhammad Ali Pasha decided to establish one entity to handle all the projects. In 1836 the Department of Public Works was established and was presided over by Linant de Bellefonds (later known as Linant Pasha). His position would associate him in a long and fruitful career with most of the great works of modernizing Egypt's irrigation system. But this also meant trouble for Mougel Bey as he and Linant had always been opposed to each other. Each had his own design for the Nile Barrages, and Mougel's had been preferred. Linant left sufficiently on record his jealousy of his rival, and seems to have come easily to the conclusion that his rival's Barrage was a costly failure, of no more use than those useless old Pyramids a few miles off.

=== Under Abbas Hilmi I ===
Muhammad Ali Pasha died in 1848 without seeing the Delta dams completed. He was succeeded by his grandson Abbas Hilmi I, (1848–1854) whose known contempt towards his grandfather caused him to halt or entirely abandon most of Muhammad Ali Pasha's massive projects, including the Delta Barrages. Abbas Pasha had no faith in the project and wished to abandon the construction of the dams. He dismissed Mougel Bey in April, 1853, and placed Mazhar Bey in charge of the work. Sensing his master's lack of enthusiasm for the project, Mazhar Bey, a Turkish engineer, did not do much to finish the work which would only be completed later during the time of Egypt's next Wali from Muhammad Ali Dynasty, Sa'id Pasha.

=== Under Sa'id Pasha ===
Under Sa'id Pasha's rule (1854–1863) there were several reforms as he tried to portray himself as the new great reformer. Some modernization of Egyptian and Sudanese infrastructure occurred using western loans. During this period, the Nizarah (or Ministry) of Public Works was established in 1857. It actually comprised many departments like the departments of Railroads, Telegraphs, Surveying, Building Construction, Agriculture, Alexandria Harbor, Antiquity, the Opera House, the Zoological Garden, the Aquarium Garden, Sewage, and Irrigation. Linant continued in charge of public works, as director general beginning with 1862, and as Minister of Public Works in 1869. He retired from this post in the same year (1869) and in 1873 was given the title Pasha by Khedieve Ismail Pasha.

==== The Suez Canal ====
In 1854 the first act of concession of land for the Suez Canal was granted to a French diplomat Ferdinand de Lesseps. Actual construction of the maritime canal lasted for 11 years (1858–1869). From its early start, design and construction work of this international waterway were kept out of the Department of Public Works and was totally handled by the Suez Canal Company, which would become a state within the state and would later have its strong impact on the Anglo-Egyptian relations.

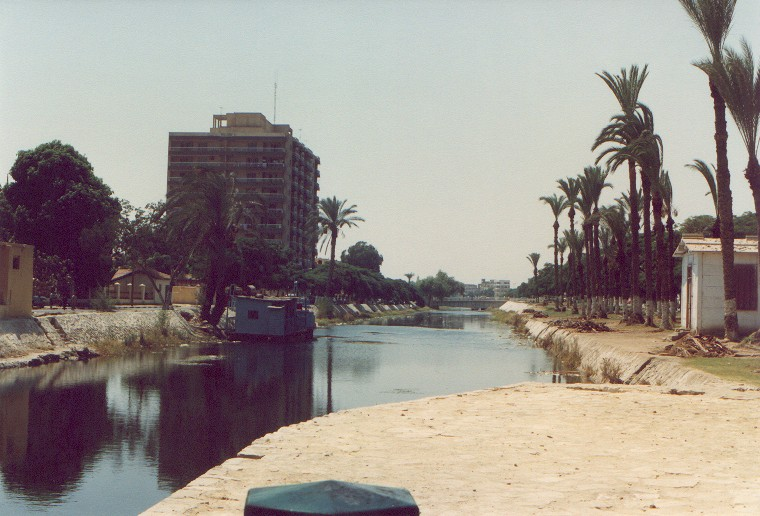
The Ismailia Canal

==== The Ismailia Canal ====
The first major project the department under Linant (now under his new title as director general) constructed was the Ismailia canal. It was constructed between 1861 and 1863, in virtue of agreements between the Egyptian Government and the Suez Canal Company, for the purpose of creating a navigable waterway between the Nile and the planned Suez maritime canal; to furnish water for irrigating some lands conceded to the company, and finally to provide for the needs of the maritime canal and the towns and stations established along its course a daily supply of 70,000 cubic meters of fresh water. It was designed by Linant who also managed its construction.

The Ismailia canal has its inlet at Cairo upstream of the Delta Barrages. It actually used to have two inlets, one called the Kasr-el-Nil, in the heart of Cairo. This was the oldest, but it was abandoned later after the area got very urbanized. The other inlet, called Shobra, is situated 7 kilometers below in the now bustling Shobra district in northern Cairo. After leaving its inlet, the canal follows the edge of the desert until it reaches the little Wadi Tumilat, which it crosses and follows the north side, trending direct to the east as far as the town of Ismailia, where it discharges into Lake Timsah. A branch, which begins a little before Ismailia, stretches toward the south across the desert, following a line parallel to the maritime Suez canal and empties into the channel of the port of Suez.

The line of the Ismailia canal conforms at many points to the direction followed by the ancient canal, which, according to historians, put the Nile in communication with Lake Timsah, or with the Red Sea itself, and of which traces have been found on the surface. The length of the canal between the Nile and Lake Timseh is 136 kilometers, and the length of the Suez branch is 89 kilometers.

=== Under Ismail Pasha ===
During the reign of Ismail Pasha (1863–1879), many great public works projects were constructed. Over 8,000 miles (13,000 km) of new canals (the longest of which was the Ibrahimiya Canal) were dug; the cultivated area increased from 3,050,000 feddans in 1813 to 4,743,000 in 1877. Ismail's khedivate is also closely connected to the construction of the Suez Canal. He agreed to, and oversaw, the Egyptian portion of its construction. Although Ismail was the greatest modernizer of Egypt since Muhammad Ali Pasha, his wars of expansion into Africa and the many infrastructure projects he carried, including the costly Suez Canal, put the country heavily in debt. In 1879 he was forced out of power by Great Britain and France who replaced him with his much less capable son Tawfiq.

==== The Ibrahimiya Canal ====
The Ibrahimiya Canal was the most important public work executed under the newly established Ministry of Public Works. It was built during the reign of Ismail Pasha when he was Khedive of Egypt. It was built in 1873 by Bahgat Pasha, minister of public works, who designed it primarily to provide perennial irrigation to the Khedivial sugar estates in Middle Egypt. It supplied perennial irrigation to 580,000 acres (2,300 km^{2}) and flood irrigation to another 420,000 acres (1,700 km^{2}). The discharge of the canal varied between 30 and 80 cubic meters per second in summer and between 500 and 900 cubic metres per second in flood. Having its head on the left bank of the Nile, opposite Assiut, it runs northwards for 60 kilometers and then divides in Dirout into two main branches; one branch is the Bahr Yousef Canal, while the other is the Ibrahimiya Canal proper.

=== Troubled years ===
Between 1849 and 1879, was the time of the great expansion and development of a centralized Egyptian bureaucracy, and important structural changes occurred in the Egyptian system of government. A trend of discontinuity of entities within the Egyptian government became apparent during these years. Departments of the government (Public Works included) were continuously being combined and recombined, abolished and reformed, or otherwise modified. From 1864 to 1866 that time, the Department of Public Works assumed jurisdiction over railways and was also given supervision of the Delta Barrages. In 1866, railways administration was separated from the Department of Public works which was reduced into an office (qalam) within the Department of Interior. Public Works was subsequently reconstituted as a department and with combined with Education into a single administration under Ali Mubarak, yet by 1869 it seems to have resumed an independent existence under its own director Linant Bey. After his resignation in 1870, public works was joined to Education and Charitable Endowments and was headed by Ali Mubarak for a second time. In November 1871 it was converted into an office of engineering and was placed under Interior again. By 1872, it had been reestablished as a department one more time, but in August of the same year it was joined again to Education and Charitable Endowments. Twelve months later, owing to the transfer of its director to Interior, it was returned to Interior. Two months later, it was joined to the War Department. In 1875, Public Works was reattached to Interior.

Following the Egyptian military's seizure of power in 1882, General Mahmoud Fehmy was appointed Minister of Public Works, a role he combined with his military duties.

== The British Occupation Period (1882–1922) ==
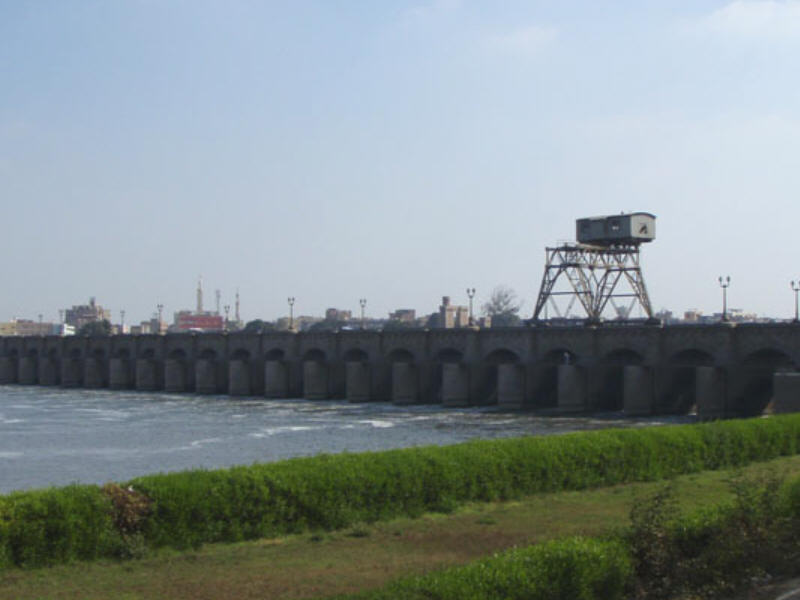
Replaced Nile Barrage at Damietta Nile Branch (from downstream)

After the British occupation of Egypt in 1882, British engineers took control of the department. They concentrated on building coffer dams, and facilitating the growing barrage trade. The impact of hydraulic developments was a dramatic increase in the output of Egyptian agriculture. Some of the greatest civil engineers of the 19th century worked in the department in this era, including Sir Colin Scott-Moncrieff, Sir Hanbury Brown, Sir Benjamin Baker and Sir William Willcocks, most of whom had been trained or experienced in British India. All the major dams controlling the Nile (the Old Aswan Dam and Esna, Nag Hammadi, Assiut, Edfeina and Zifta barrages) were constructed during this period. The venerable Delta Barrage, was finally replaced in 1939 by the newly constructed Mohammed Ali Barrage several hundred meters downstream from the original barrage location, and would again be relegated to the status of a romantic river crossing. Harold Edwin Hurst's work in Egypt started in 1906 and lasted 62 years doing his best work after he reached 65. He championed the prelude to the new Aswan High Dam project which was built using his calculations of the required long-term storage capacity.

== The Modern Period (1922 to present) ==
Egyptian engineers operated the Department after Egypt was liberated from the British rule. The biggest and most complicated of all public works in Egyptian history (Aswan High Dam) was constructed during this period. This period experienced influence of Soviet engineers in the 1950s and the 1960s. This was replaced by some influence of American engineers in the 1980s and the 1990s.

Currently, all the public works in Egypt are controlled by the Ministry of Water Resources and Irrigation. The goal of the Ministry of Water Resources and Irrigation is to implement feasible projects that will increase agricultural productivity. The Irrigation Improvement Project was designed to do that through improving the conveyance efficiency on both the main system, the mesqa system and on-farm level.
