= Charles Joseph Lambert (engineer) =

French explorer and engineer

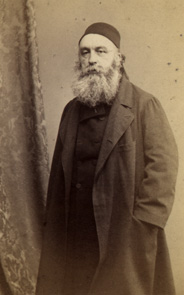
- Born: 2 May 1804; Valenciennes
- Died: 13 February 1864 (aged 59); Paris, Second French Empire
- Citizenship: France
- Education: École Polytechnique
- Occupations: Explorer, Engineer
- Known for: Suez Canal
- Awards: Knight of the Legion of Honour; Title of Bey

Charles Joseph Lambert, also known as Lambert Bey (Valenciennes, May 2, 1804 - Paris, February 13, 1864) was a French explorer and engineer.

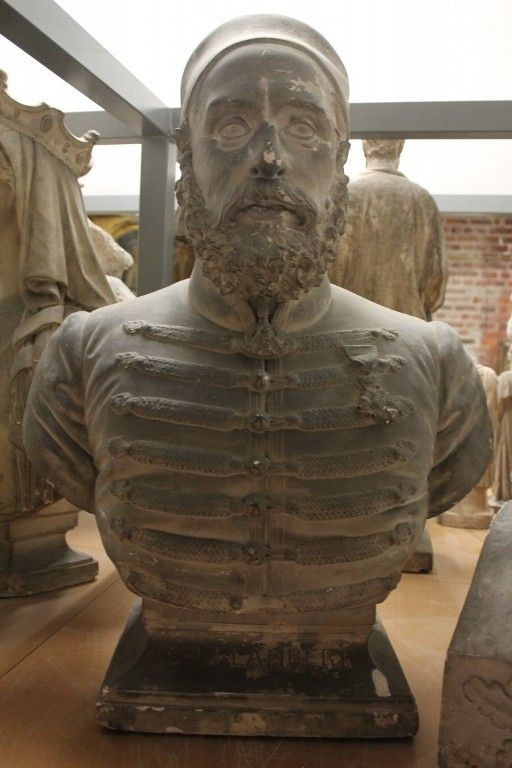
Buste of Charles Joseph Lambert aka Lambert Bey

== Biography ==
Lambert was a student of the École polytechnique (1822) and graduated as a mining engineer (1824). Around the year 1829, Lambert met "father" Barthélemy Prosper Enfantin, Michel Chevalier, and Fournel who were trying to propagate the doctrine of Saint-Simonism.

The young engineer became one of their favorite disciples, and abandoned his position to participate in the new religion. Lambert took an active part in the teachings of rue Monsigny, collaborating with the newspaper Le Globe and during the split that occurred in the Saint-Simonian family, he chose to side with Enfantin.

In 1832, Lambert was not included in the lawsuits against the Saint-Simonians. From his refuge at Ménilmontant, he appeared as trial counsel for one of the accused and produced an incisive and mocking speech which elicited a number of observations from the presiding judge.

Sometime afterward (1833), Lambert left for Egypt, and at first taught mathematics in Cairo but soon caught the attention of the Egyptian vice-roy, Muhammad Ali, who gave Lambert several missions:

Lambert created the ( l'École des mines) Mining School which he directed from 1836 to 1840, and then the Bulaq École polytechnique that he directed from 1840 to 1849. Lambert made it the flagship of the educational system organized by Muhammad Ali. Through the network of professors he built up from Egyptians sent to Paris, he was able to train excellent engineers who were considered "civilized" in the term of the day - that is to say, believing in the efficiency of technical progress as a factor of economic development and social progress. A member of the Higher Council for Education, Lambert participated in the development of all reforms of the school system in close liaison with Minister Ethem Bey.

Lambert also provided technical expertise for many projects. The record he created in 1849 of the work he conducted and to which he lent assistance during the reign of Muhammad Ali is eloquent: the Nile Barrage, railroads, irrigation, mines, topography and maps, public works, school programs and inspections, an observatory, gunpowder and saltpeter, paper factories, roads, bridges, causeways, and waster distribution in Cairo.

=== The Suez Canal ===
During his time in Egypt, Lambert attentively studied the work of French engineer, Jacques-Marie Le Père, who at the end of the 18th century proposed a canal to traverse the Suez Isthmus. Lambert initiated a feasibility study and 3 drilling projects for the Suez Canal and he drew the public's attention to this project. These results of these three projects were sent to Louis Maurice Adolphe Linant de Bellefonds by Enfantin. Linant worked together with Eugène Mougel on the project that was later realized by Ferdinand de Lesseps.

Lambert's services in Egypt were rewarded with the title of Bey in 1847.

=== Later life ===
In 1851, Lambert settled in Paris and devoted his leisure to questions of philosophy: he published a very curious study about the Trinity which was a great success when it appeared in La Revue philosophique et religieuse.

Lambert died in 1864 and was buried at the Montparnasse Cemetery.

== Awards ==
- Knight of the Legion of Honor, June 9, 1843

== Bibliography ==
- Alfred Mézières, Lettres, sciences, arts: Encyclopédie universelle du XXe, 1908, p. 56
- Numa Broc, Dictionnaire des Explorateurs français du XIXe siècle, T.1, Afrique, CTHS, 1988, pp. 185–186
- François Angelier, Dictionnaire des Voyageurs et Explorateurs occidentaux, Pygmalion, 2011, p. 414
