= Dual control =

Dual control can refer either to a concept in government, or a concept in airplane operation:

- Dual control (politics)
- Dual control (aviation)

== See also ==
- Dual control stand
- Dual control theory
- Dual mandate
