= Suez Company (1858–1997) =

Transport company

Compagnie de Suez
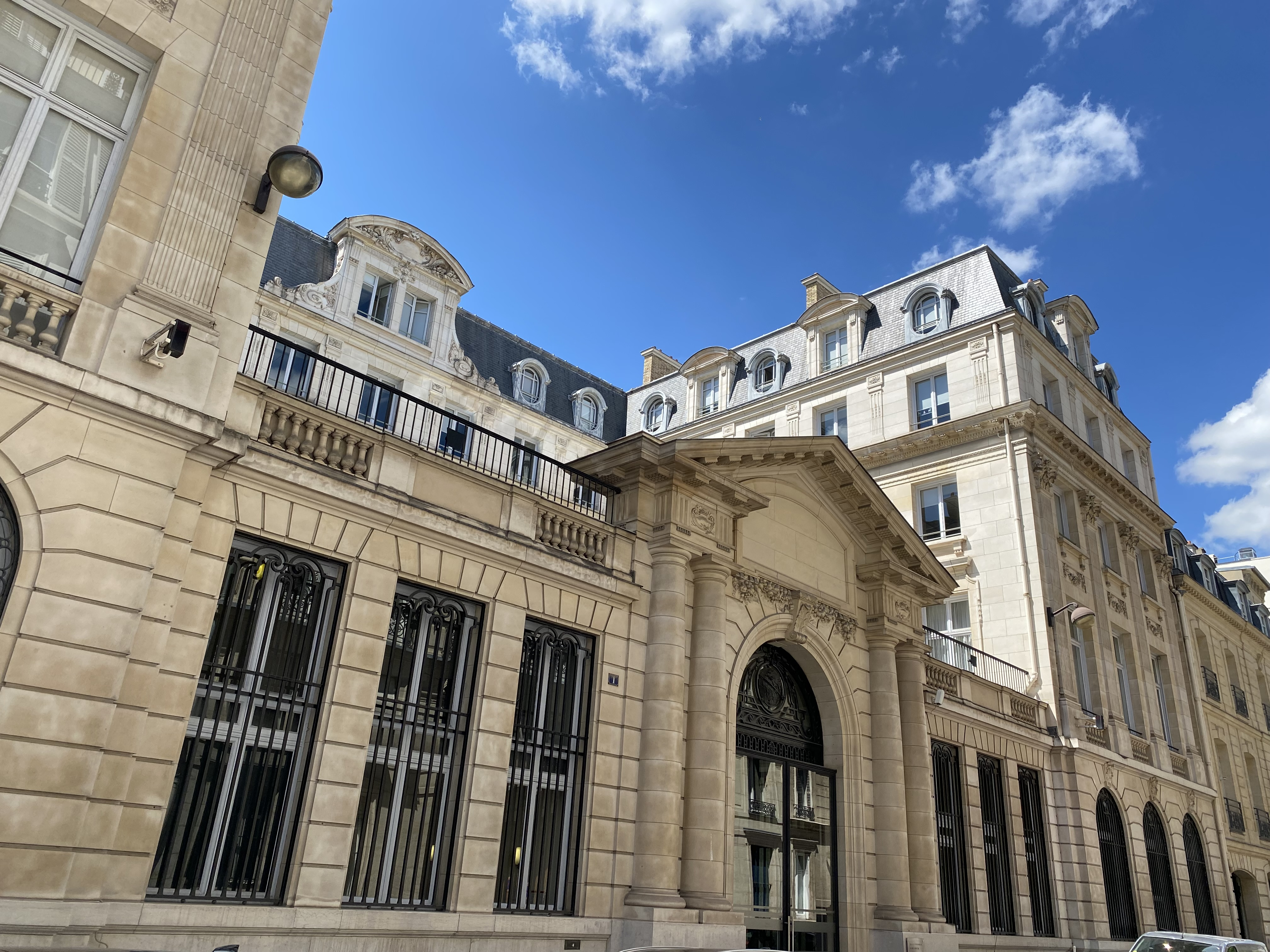
- Former head office of the Suez Company at 1 rue d'Astorg in Paris
- Industry: Transportation infrastructure, then investment
- Founded: 1858
- Founder: Ferdinand de Lesseps
- Defunct: 1997
- Fate: Merger to form Suez-Lyonnaise des eaux
- Successor: Banque Indosuez; Engie; Suez
- Headquarters: Paris

The Suez Company or Suez Canal Company, full initial name Compagnie universelle du canal maritime de Suez (Universal Company of the Maritime Canal of Suez), sometimes colloquially referred to in French as Le Suez ("The Suez"), was a company formed by Ferdinand de Lesseps in 1858 to operate the Egyptian granted concession of the Suez Canal, which the company built between 1859 and 1869. Initially, French investors held half of the Company's stock, with Egypt's ruler Sa'id Pasha holding most of the balance. In 1875, financial distress forced Sa'id's successor Isma'il Pasha to sell the country's shares to the government of the United Kingdom. The Suez Company operated the canal until Egypt's new president Gamal Abdel Nasser revoked its concession in 1956 and transferred canal operation to the state-owned Suez Canal Authority, precipitating the Suez Crisis.

Following the loss of the canal concession, the Suez Company received financial compensation from the Egyptian government, the final payment of which was made in 1962, and used this resource to reinvent itself as a major investment and holding company in France. In 1958 it renamed itself the Compagnie financière de Suez ("Suez Financial Company"), and in 1967 changed its name again to Compagnie financière de Suez et de l'Union parisienne, a change that was reversed in 1972. It was nationalized in 1982, then privatized in 1987. It acquired control of the Société Générale de Belgique in 1988, and changed name again to Compagnie de Suez in 1990. In 1997, it merged with water utility and construction conglomerate Lyonnaise des eaux to form Suez-Lyonnaise des eaux. The merged entity renamed itself as Suez in 2001 and underwent several subsequent mergers, spin-offs, and restructurings that led to the creation of the energy company Engie and the water and waste-management utility also named Suez.

== Background ==
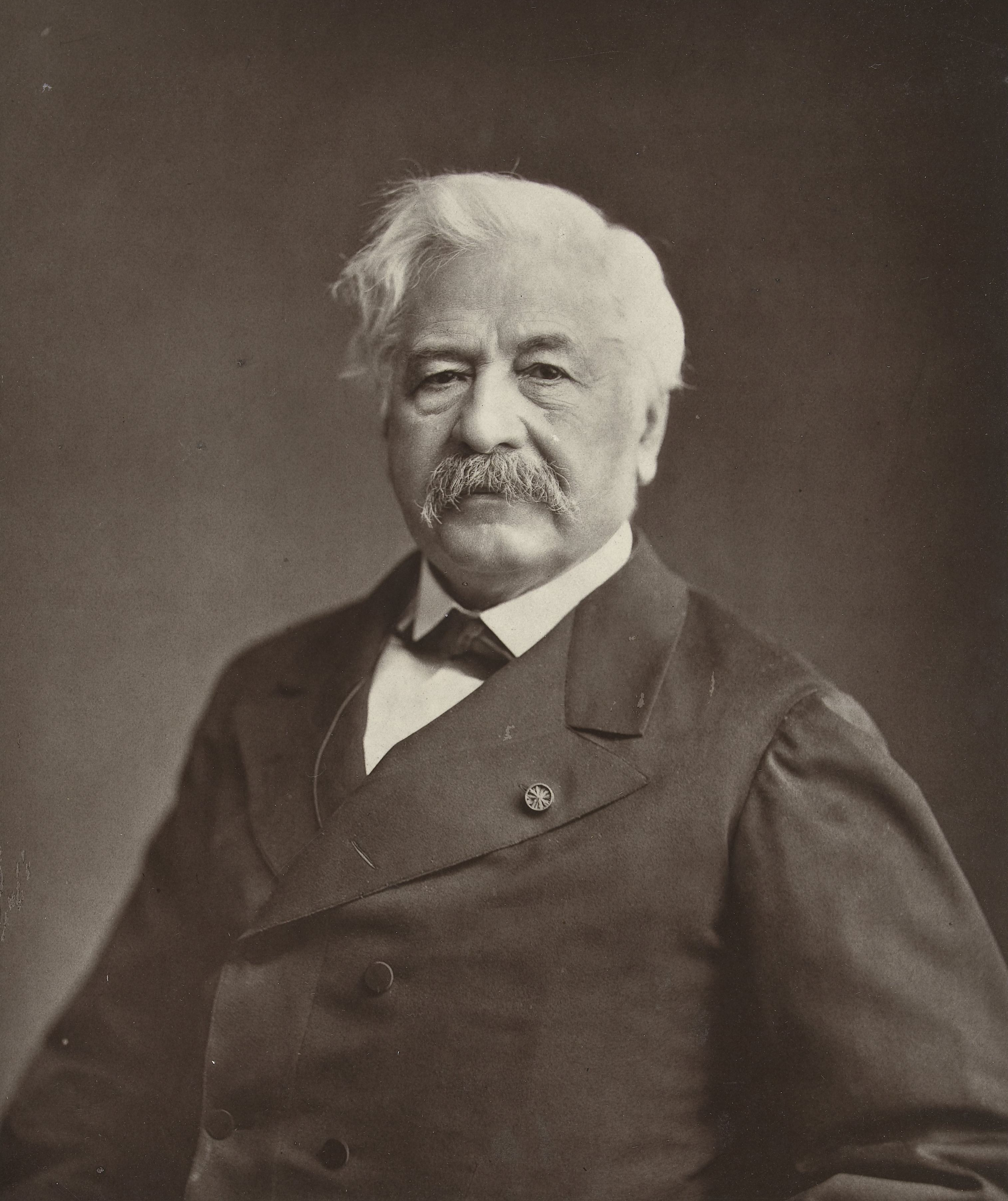
Ferdinand de Lesseps in the 1870s, photographed by Nadar

=== Original canal concession (1854) ===
In 1822, King William I of the Netherlands founded the "Société Générale des Pays-Bas" in Brussels; subsequently, in 1830, the Société Générale des Pays-Bas became the Société Générale de Belgique. The original concession assembled by Ferdiand de Lesseps and granted by Sa'id of Egypt in 1854 included the following stipulations: 10 percent of the annual profits were reserved for the founders, 15 percent of the annual profits were reserved for the Government of Egypt, and 75 percent of the annual profits were reserved for shareholders. There was no stipulation dictating whether the route of the canal would be direct or indirect (from the Nile). The company was given the right to free quarries and import equipment tax-free.

In that original concession, founding members of the Company were to receive 10 percent of the canal's profits. These members included François Barthélemy Arlès-Dufour, Louis Maurice Adolphe Linant de Bellefonds, Richard Cobden, Barthélemy Prosper Enfantin, Benoît Fould, Lesseps and several members of his family, Eugène Mougel, Ruyssenaers (Dutch Consul General in Egypt), M. Sabatier (French Consul General), Sa'id of Egypt and multiple members of his family, Paulin Talabot and his brother Edmond, and members of the chambers of commerce of Lyon and Venice.

=== Second canal concession (1856) ===
Following the granting of the first concession in 1854, de Lesseps was in near constant travel to assemble diplomatic approvals perceived as necessary to build the canal from other foreign governments involved. Although the first concession was granted by Egypt, at the time Egypt was an administrative subdivision of the Ottoman Empire, and so de Lesseps traveled frequently to the Sublime Porte to make his case to the Grand Vizier of the Sultan, Mehmed Emin Âli Pasha. The Ottoman Empire, although neutral to the idea, were greatly under the influence of the British at that time due to the Crimean War. Since Britain – through the policy of Lord Palmerston – was largely opposed to the canal project, and its citizens owned a potentially competing project in form of a railroad from Alexandria to Cairo, not to mention various merchant warehouses along the African sea route, Lesseps made several trips to Britain between 1854 and 1858 to persuade Palmerston and the British public. De Lesseps also had to fight back against Robert Stephenson's and even Barthélemy Prosper Enfantin's expert opinions on the feasibility of the canal. De Lesseps formed an organization of international engineers (the International Commission for the piercing of the isthmus of Suez) to again study the canal route in late 1855, and its results were released to the general public.

In January 1856, Sa'id granted a second concession to de Lesseps' company which replaced the first concession. This concession defined the canal as a direct route, but also stipulated a freshwater canal from the Nile to Lake Timsah. Again, mining and land rights were included along with generous tax exemptions. A majority (4/5ths) of the workers for the company were required to be supplied from Egypt and the skilled workers were required to be paid commensurate with skilled workers on other Egyptian public works projects. An amendment stipulated that work could only commence with the approval of the Ottoman Sultan. The board of directors of the concessionaire company would have 32 members, each serving for eight years. The operations office would be headquartered in Alexandria, while administrative offices would be located in Paris. This company was to be called the Universal Company of the Maritime Canal of Suez.

== Creation and initial public offering ==
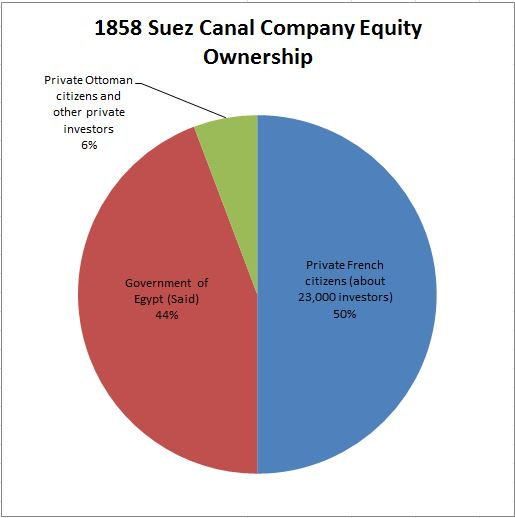
1858 Suez Canal Company Equity Ownership

In late Spring of 1858, the French Academy of Sciences released a public report approving of the engineering plans for the canal. The report noted that in the previous two decades, Europeans had spent 12 billion francs building railroads, and that at a cost of 200 million francs (or £8 million), the canal was affordable. De Lesseps pushed ahead without formal British or Ottoman approval. In October 1858, de Lesseps notified international press and company agents that 400,000 shares at a price of 500 francs each would be publicly offered beginning 5 November 1858. In the notification, de Lesseps estimated an annual revenue of 30 million francs based on freight fees, and a construction period lasting 6 years. In preparation for the offering, shares were sent to brokerage houses across Europe and in the United States. At the close of offering on 30 November 1858, about half of the shares (around 200,000) belonged to French citizens with the next largest block owned by citizens of the Ottoman Empire (Sa'id bought around 60,000). None of the shares reserved for Britain, Russia, Austria, or the United States were bought. Sa'id purchased the remaining unbought shares (for a total of 177,000 shares) in order to ensure that the company reached its necessary capitalization amount (to become a legal entity as defined in the 1856 concession). The average number of shares bought by French investors amounted to nine shares each. De Lesseps declared the company as being officially formed on 15 December 1858.

== Canal construction ==
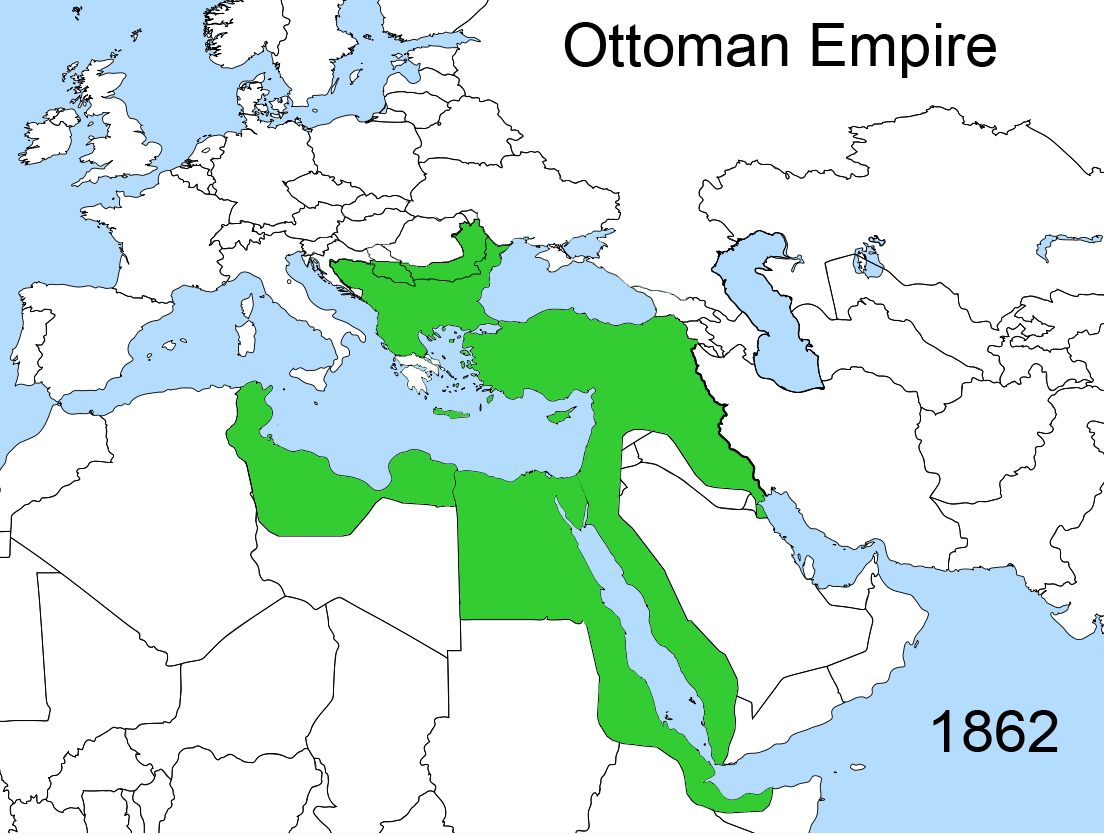
Ottoman Empire in 1862

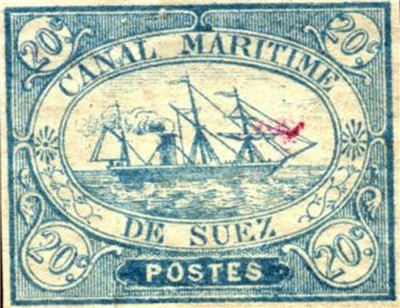
Suez Company stamp, 1868

Prior to the existence of the Suez Canal, Port Said and Lake Timsah had few residents, the Great Bitter Lake was a dry basin, and drinking water was difficult to find. In addition to infrastructure challenges, Sa'id would not allow the use of massive corvée labour until 1861, when Napoleon III publicly backed the canal project. In the meantime from 1859 to 1861, the company's Chief Engineer Eugène Mougel and its new superintendent Alphonse Hardon, planned for and built fresh water distilleries along the route, hauled in additional fresh water from the Nile, built housing for workers, gathered stone for the jetty, assembled some aging dredging equipment from the Nile, and looked for workers. Company town establishments arose along the route. In 1860, the company employed 210 Europeans and 544 Egyptians along 11 stations of the route. Employees were provided scrip to buy provisions. Plans were made for an access canal from the Nile to Lake Timsah to provide fresh water. Once the necessary infrastructure was established, the plan was to build an 8 metre-wide access canal from Port Said to Lake Timsah and later from Lake Timsah to the Red Sea with the aid of blasting. After the use of corvée labor was approved in 1861, work proceeded south from Lake Manzala with, at its height, 60,000 fellahin hand digging the canal. Guards were used to watch over the fellahin, although a large number of guards were not required due to the remote location and nearby hostile Bedouins. At the same time, the freshwater canal was being dug easterly to Lake Timsah. At the end of 1862, the access canal connecting Lake Timsah to the Mediterranean Sea was complete. François Philippe Voisin became chief engineer in January 1861 and Hardon's contract expired at the end of 1862. Compared with the later mechanised excavation, a low amount of material was excavated during this phase of construction. The British began to loudly decry the use of corvée labor in 1862.

Sa'id died in January 1863. His successor, Isma'il, declared that he was establishing reforms in the ways of the creation of a civil service list and the abolishment of corvée labor. Isma'il's motives had to do with his own personal projects (cotton farms, whose export from Egypt had been increasing since the beginning of the American Civil War, and other cash crops and public works) within Egypt and with limiting the company's power. Isma'il would soon issue a clarification that corvée labor could still be used for public works essential for the common good (though not on the Suez Canal project). The British also commented on the use of forced labor by the company. Isma'il issued declarations upholding much of the previous concessions, with exceptions including the labor issue. Sultan Abdulaziz favored the end of the use of the corvée and the return of land from the company to Egypt. The problem was referred during 1864 to the arbitration of Napoleon III. Isma'il authorised Boghos Nubar Nubarian to negotiate on behalf of Egypt, and Nubar in turn allied with Emile Ollivier and Charles de Morny, Duke of Morny against de Lesseps and the company. It wasn't until July 1864 that Napoleon III released a ruling for the framework for resolution which accepted the 1856 concession as a binding contract, ended the use of corvée labor, placed the land grants back into the hands of the Egyptian government, but called for remuneration of 84 million francs to the Suez Canal Company for violation of the labor and land agreements. Isma'il received a loan from the Oppenheim brothers for nearly 100 million francs.

Meanwhile, the progress of the canal construction proceeded slowly from 1863–1864. By February 1864, the corvée had finished the access canal from Lake Timsah to the Red Sea.

After Napoleon III's decree in Summer of 1864, the use of corvée labor was restricted. The use of large mechanical dredging machines began to excavate the main canal. In December 1863, Voisin hired Paul Borel and Alexandre Lavalley's company, Borel, Lavalley, and Company, to design, build, and operate the dredging and excavation machines to finish the canal. Borel and Lavalley, like many of the engineers working on the project, were École Polytechnique alumni. These machines were powered by steam from coal in an era before the mass production of machines and machine tools. The men had prior railroad experience and Lavalley, in particular, had customised locomotives, designed lighthouses on the Black Sea, created a tunnel boring machine in Lithuania, and created a machine to dredge ports in Russia. Railroad tracks were laid along the canal route to accommodate some of the machines, whereas others were mounted on barges. The varying soil type necessitated more than a dozen different types of excavation machinery. Nearly 300 of these machines were used in this 5 year dredging period. Their subcontractor excavation price was determined on a price-per-unit basis – francs per cubic meter – which was further varied depending upon the soil type they excavated. Ultimately, Borel, Lavalley and company removed 75% of the 74 million cubic meters excavated from the main canal. And most of that work was done between 1867 and 1869. Another French contractor, Alphonse Couvreux, who is credited with the first documented use of a bucket chain excavator on land, employed seven of his excavators to dig about 8 million cubic yards of material from 1863 to 1868.

During this same period, the jetties for Port Said were also constructed by the Dussaud brothers. They created two jetty structures, one at 1.5 miles in length, and the other at 2 miles in length, by dumping 20-ton concrete blocks in the Mediterranean Sea. The blocks were produced in an assembly line with mechanical elevators to pour in cement, lime, and water. After curing for two months in wooden frames, they were lifted on to barges that dropped them into the sea. 30,000 blocks were used in the jetties.

In 1867, the company began to develop its fee structure in preparation for opening. During this same year the company had already started to charge fees for transport of goods across the northern almost-completed portion to the separate southern access canal, garnering millions of francs in annual revenue. The company estimated that of the 10 million tons of annual goods shipped around the Cape of Good Hope, half would pass through the canal. After some complaints, a figure of 10 francs per ton and 10 francs per passenger was announced.

Politically during this period, company workers experienced a cholera outbreak in 1865 that caused the deaths of several hundred Europeans, including Voisin's wife, and more than 1,500 Arabs and Egyptians. The Ottoman Sultan approved of the French reconciliation framework in 1866. By 1866 there were about 8,000 Europeans and 10,000 Arab and Egyptians that had settled in the canal region. By 1867 and 1868 the total population in the canal region would grow to 26,000 and 34,000, respectively. As the diversity and number of settlers in the canal region rose, Isma'il directed Nubar to begin his decade-long journey of revising the judicial system from a system of capitulations to a system of mixed tribunals. The company made an appeal at the 1867 Universal Exposition of Art and Industry to attempt to sell an additional 100 million francs (£4 million) worth of debt in the form of bonds – maturing in 50 years – to finish the project. Remaining unsold bonds were sold in lotteries approved by the French government.

Two dams prevented the filling of the Great Bitter Lake and thus the completion of the canal, one to the north and one to the south. Rocky terrain was cleared on the Serapeum ridge to the north of the lake for a lake filling ceremony witnessed by Isma'il in early 1869. The prince of Wales visited in the spring of 1869 shortly after the initial lake filling ceremony but while the lake was still filling and toured the canal zone. The Prince of Wales stayed in a chalet in Ismailia while in the region. The southern dam in the rocky Chalufa ridge would not connect the Red Sea with the Mediterranean Sea until it was broken on 15 August 1869. Prior to that, hand digging was used to remove soil in the remaining 10 miles between Suez and the southern dam. The average final width of the canal was 200 feet – 300 feet at the top with a depth of at least 26 feet.

The company and Isma'il set aside 1 million francs for the inauguration of the canal on 17 November 1869. One thousand guests were invited for a tour upon opening. The Empress Eugénie and Isma'il were a major attraction. The multinational flotilla of about 60 ships proceeded south from Port Said to Ismailia, where a large expenses-paid festivity took place including: a riding exhibition, a rifle competition, tight-rope walking, an Armenian with a dancing bear, an Italian with a hurdy-gurdy, Arab sword dancing, glassblowing, flame eating, snake charming, juggling, dancing darvishes, belly dancers, Koran recitations, Arabic poetry recitations, prostitution, food, and drink. On 19 November, the flotilla proceeded south to Suez.

In summary, the total construction cost of the canal, according to de Lesseps' autobiographical account, was £11,627,000. This cost was more than covered by the initial equity capitalization of £8 million (1858), a legal decision awarding about £4 million (1864 and 1866), and a bond issuance of £4 million (1867).

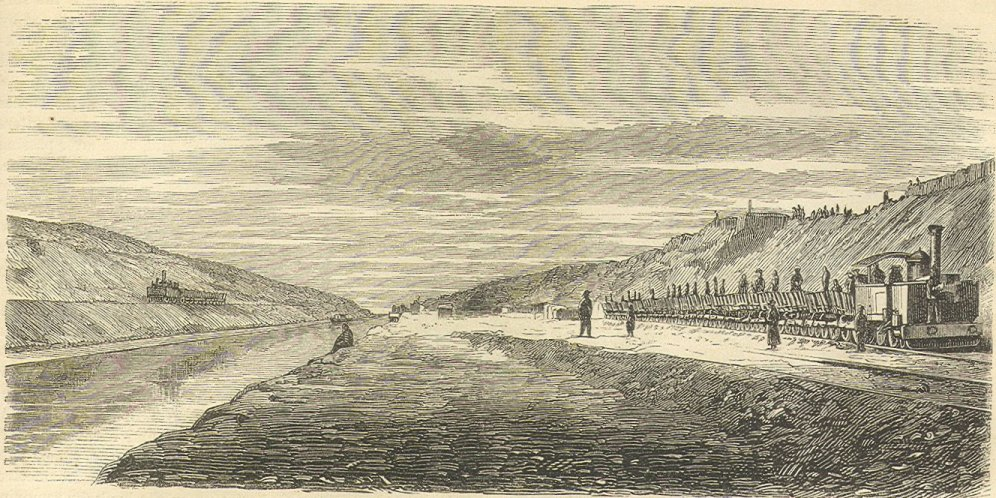
Construction trains

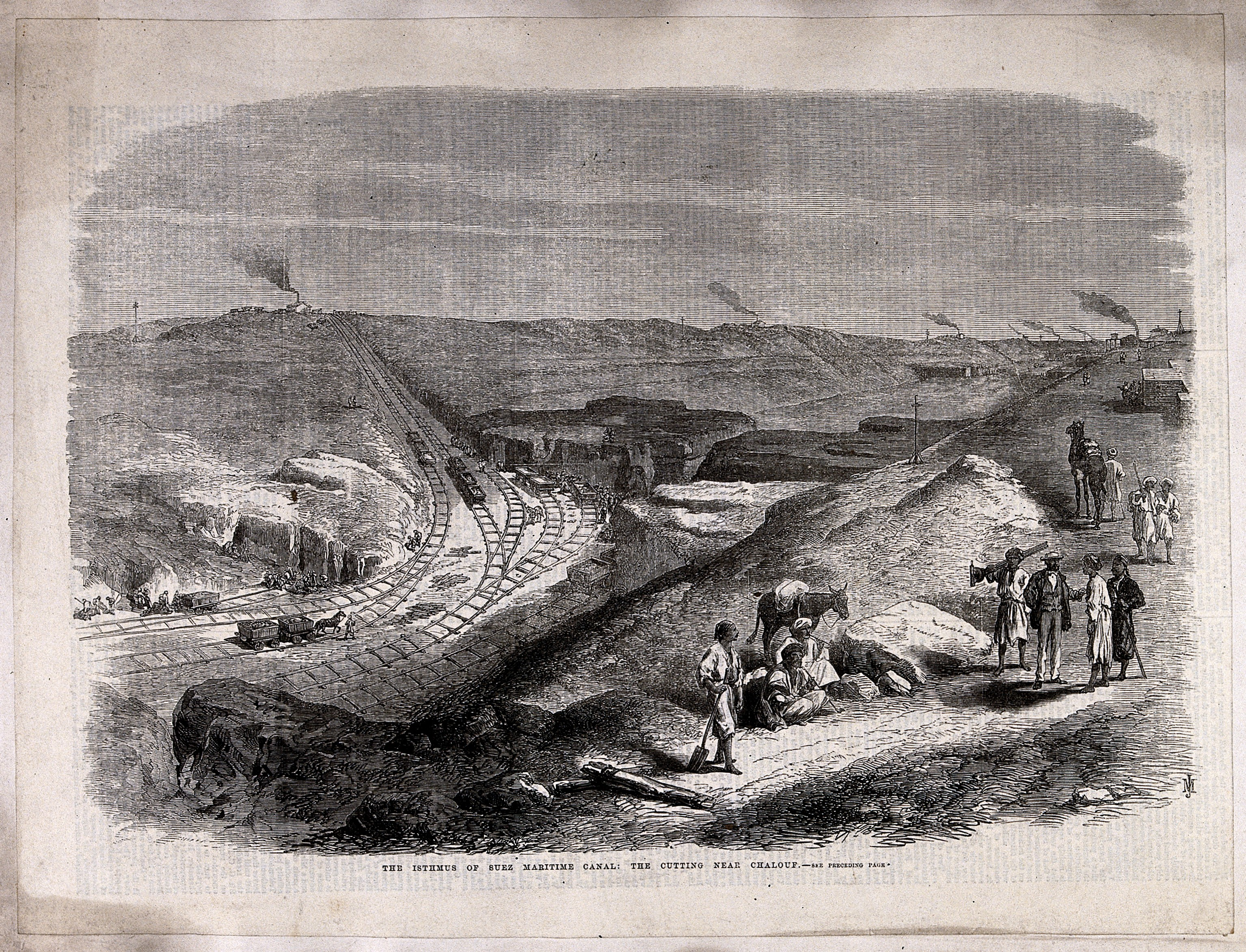
Chalufa ridge work

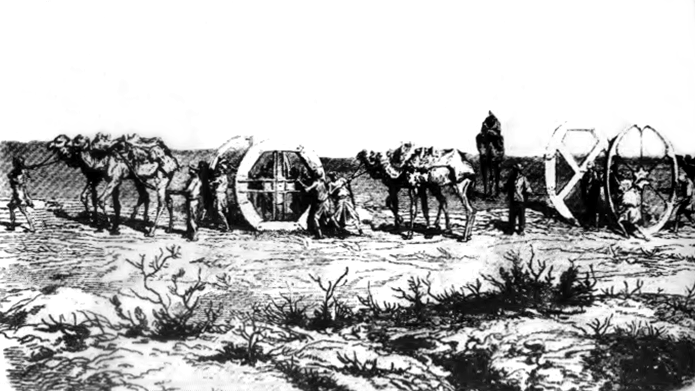
Suez canal construction laborers

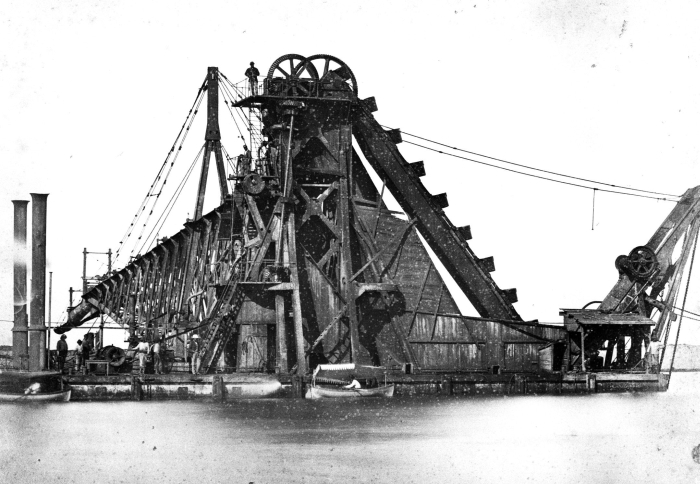
Dredge machine

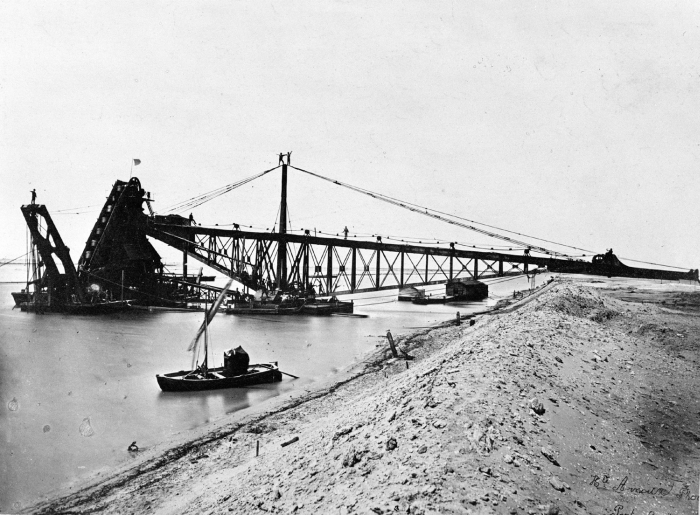
Dredging operations

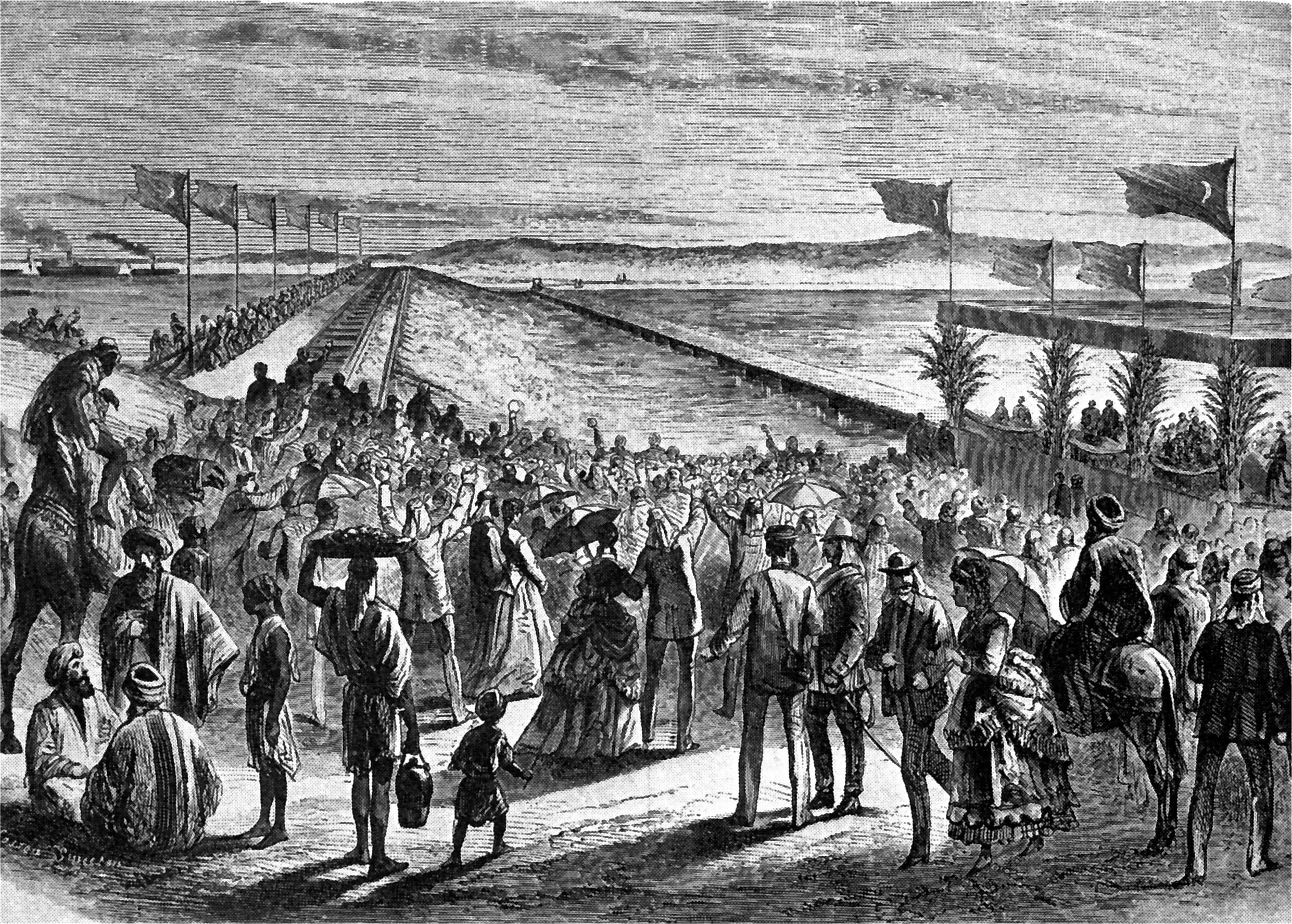
1869 inauguration, engraving

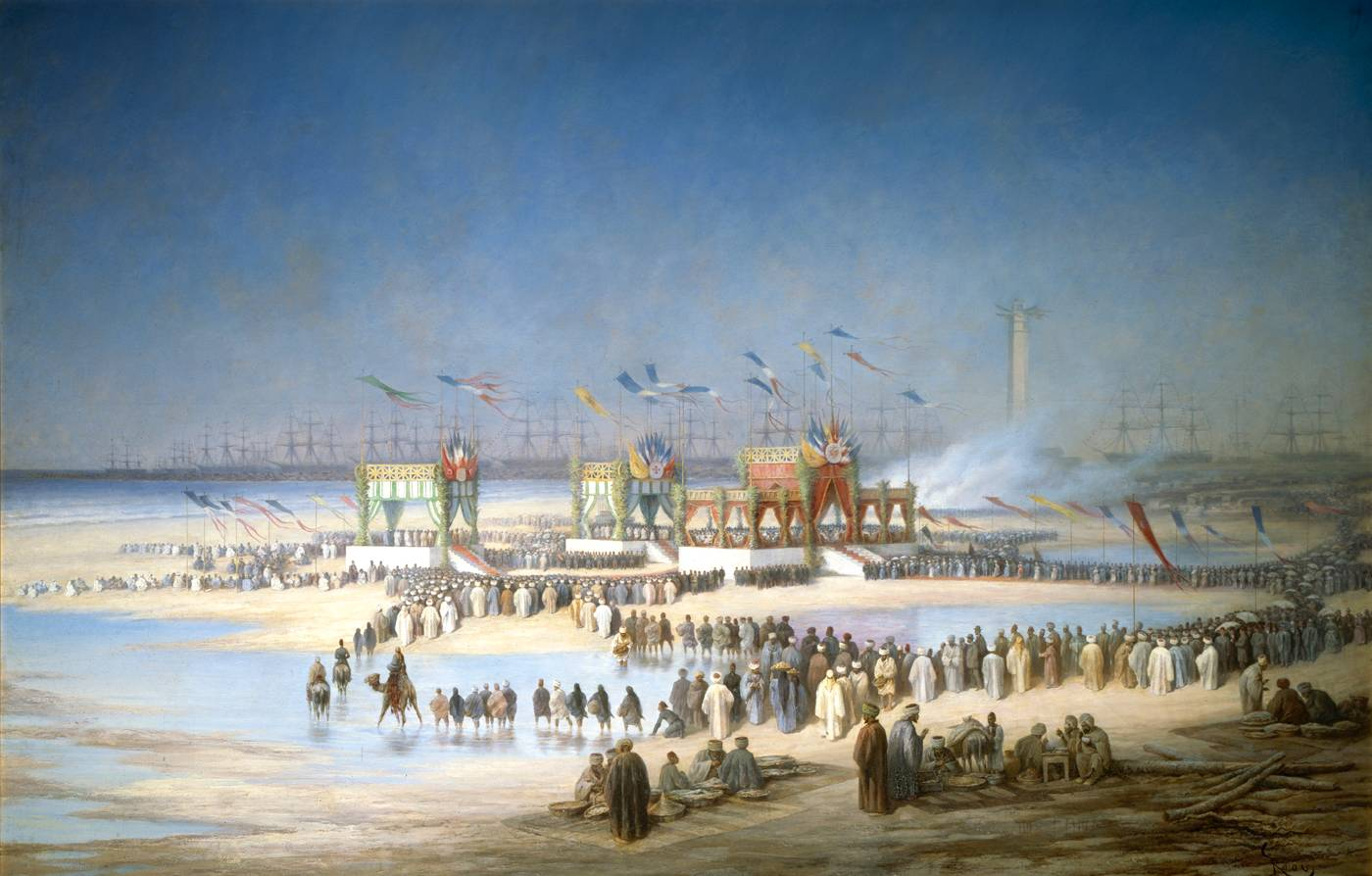
Illustration of the inauguration, by Édouard Riou in 1869

== Early operations ==
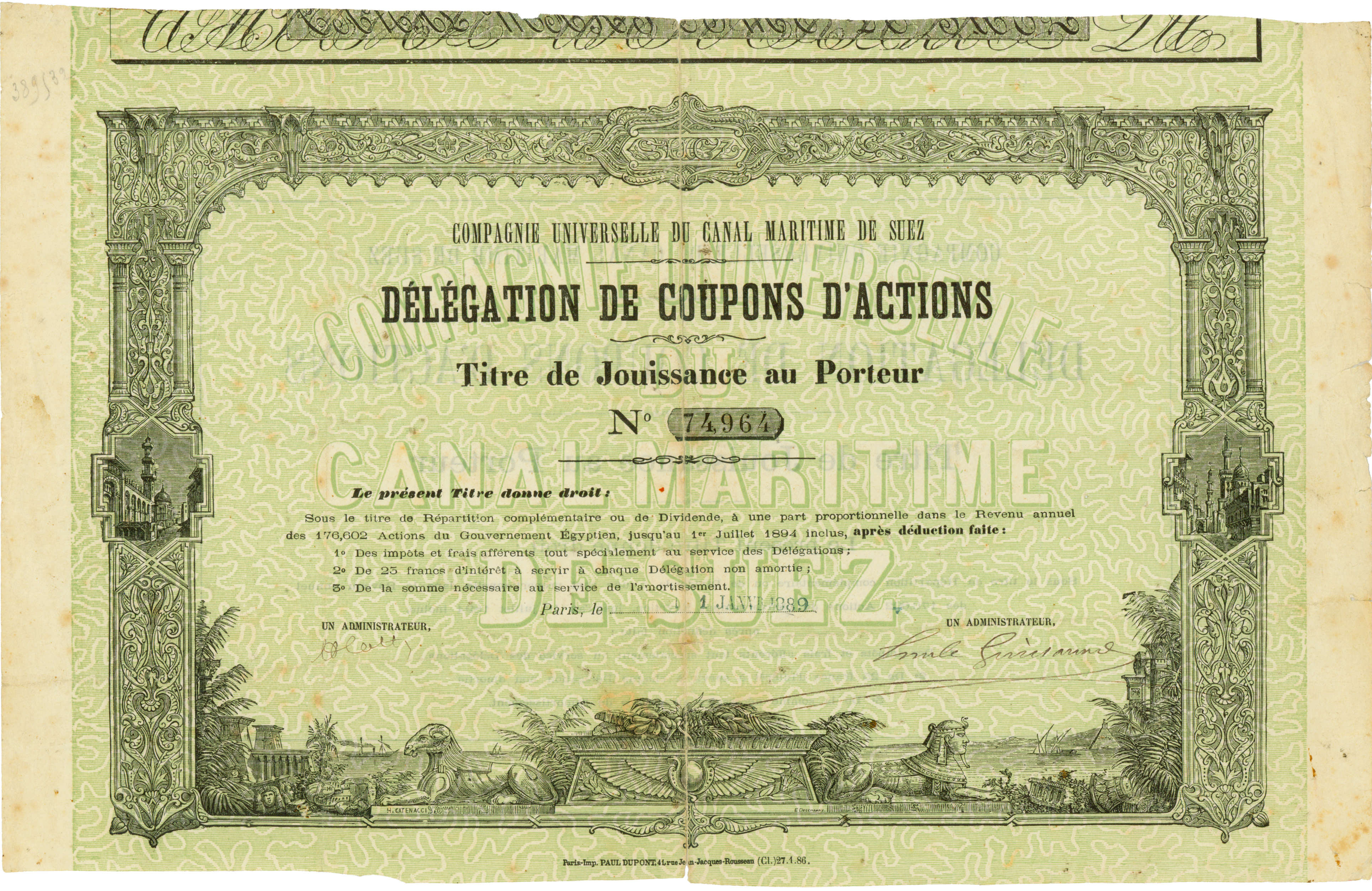
Suez Company security issued 1 January 1889

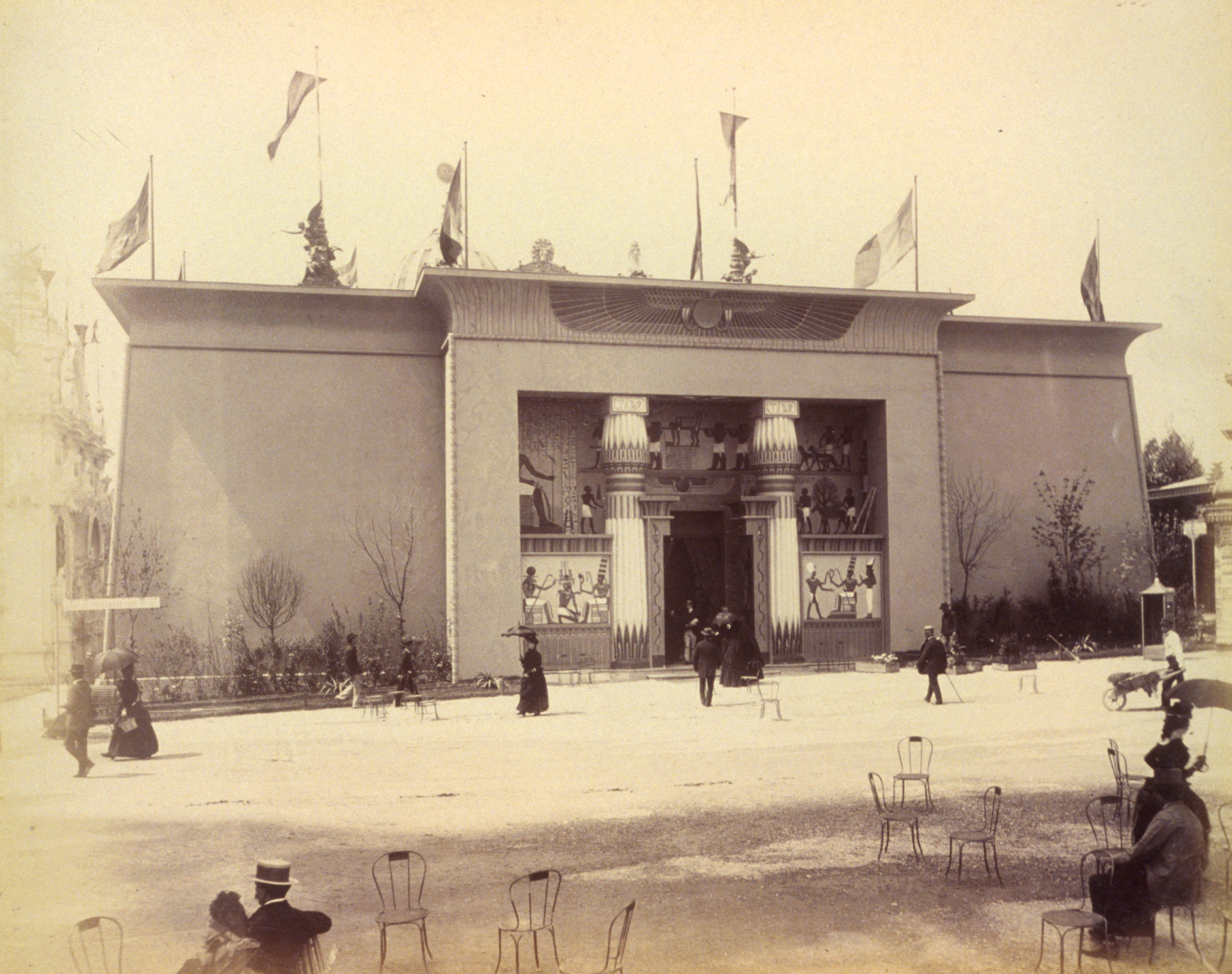
Suez Canal Company pavilion at the Exposition Universelle (1889)

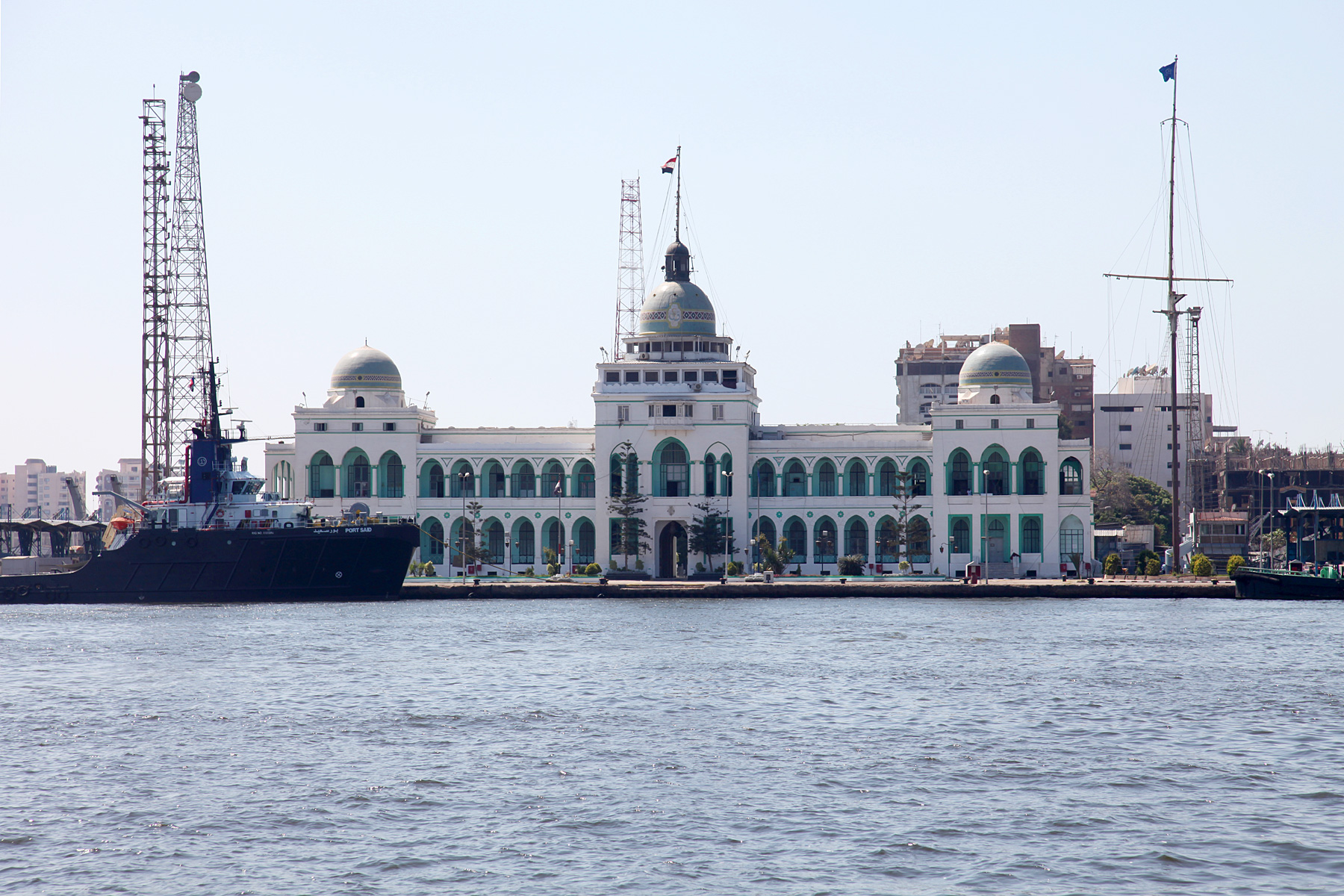
Suez Company office built by Edmond Coignet in the early 1890s, now Suez Canal House in Port Said

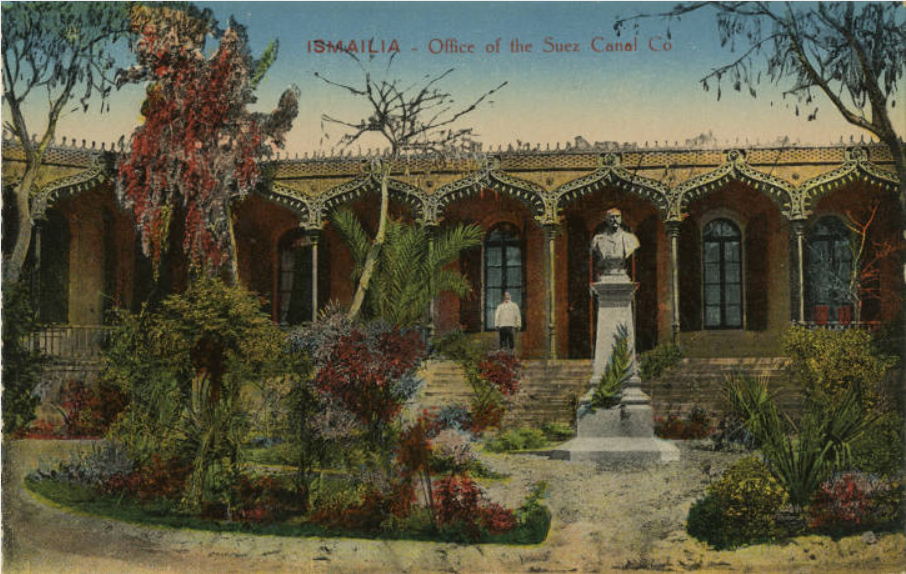
Postcard of the Suez Canal Company office in Ismailia, early 20th century

Approximately 500 ships carrying around 400,000 tons made passage through the canal in 1870, which was much less than the 5 million tons projected in 1867. Of that tonnage, three-quarters came from Britain. In 1871, more tonnage made the passage, but it was still less than 1 million tons. The ship tonnage for 1872, 1873, and 1874 was 1,439,000, 2,085,000, and 2,424,000, respectively.

Toll revenue from the first five years (1870–1874) are as follows: £206,373, £359,747, £656,305, £915,853, and £994,375.

In 1873, Isma'il borrowed £30 million (more than double the cost of the canal) to continue building other infrastructure in Egypt. By 1875, the Egyptian treasury was £100 million in debt, and no lender would issue Isma'il money to pay for the December debt instalment of several million pounds. Société Générale was interested in his shares of the Suez Canal Company in exchange for paying off the debt instalment, however, the British prime minister Benjamin Disraeli responded quickly and with permission from Queen Victoria received a £4 million loan from Lionel de Rothschild to purchase the 177,000 shares from Ismail on behalf of the British government. This offer was slightly greater than the French offer, and Isma'il physically delivered his share certificates to the British consulate. By December 1875 Britain became the largest shareholder of the Suez Canal Company, owning 44 percent of the shares. However, the remaining 56% of the company's shares remained under the ownership of French shareholders.

In 1876, Isma'il again faced government debt payment issues and was forced to join an international commission which would govern Egypt's finances known as Dual Control. As a condition of joining the Caisse de la Dette Publique commission, the Khedive's right to 15 percent of the commissions from Suez Canal traffic was sold. The buyer was a French bank and the price was 22 million francs.

In 1879, Isma'il was deposed by the Ottoman Sultan and replaced with Tewfik. Tewfik was challenged for leadership during a nationalist uprising in 1880 by Colonel Ahmad Urabi. In response to an anti-European riot in 1882, Britain landed an army, seized the canal, and developed an informal protectorate over Egypt, placing Lord Cromer as the head governing authority.

The 1888 Convention of Constantinople declared the canal a neutral zone under British protection. The agreement went into effect in 1904, the same year as the Entente cordiale between Britain and France.

== World War I and interwar period ==
The British assigned more than 100,000 troops to the canal during the First World War. The canal was used to help stage T. E. Lawrence and Faisal's Arab Revolt during the war against the Ottomans. Egypt was declared an independent country in 1922, however, Britain still asserted a right to defend the canal and stationed troops there for that purpose into the 1930s. The company's profits rose greatly during the 1920s and 1930s.

In 1938, Benito Mussolini demanded that Italy have a sphere of influence in the Suez Canal, specifically demanding that an Italian representative be placed on the company's board of directors. Italy opposed the French monopoly over the Suez Canal because under French domination of the company all Italian merchant traffic to its colony of Italian East Africa was forced to pay tolls upon entering the canal.

== From World War II to the Suez Crisis ==
Britain secured the canal against the Germans and their Afrika Korps during the Second World War. Immediately following the end of the war, company profits rose greatly due to petroleum shipments and the company reserved much of this income. By 1952, the company held four different reserves accounts: a statutory reserve of 430 million francs, a special reserve of 7 billion francs, a contingency fund of 1.72 billion francs, and a pension fund of 7.81 billion francs. After Jacques Georges-Picot's arrival to the company in the 1940s, the board started to hire investment advisors, and by the late 1940s, the company had investments in Air France, Air Liquide, colonial sugar refineries, coal mining companies, railroad companies, electric companies, the African forest and agriculture Society, and the Lyonnaise de Madagascar. King Farouk of the Muhammad Ali dynasty was overthrown in the Egyptian revolution of 1952 and Colonel Gamal Abdel Nasser eventually emerged as the leader of Egypt. By the mid-1950s, canal traffic reached 122 million tons annually, over half of which was oil shipments. In response to the World Bank denying a loan to build a dam across the Nile at Aswan, Nasser declared on 26 July 1956 that Egypt was nationalizing the canal, with compensation to the company. In response, Britain, France, and Israel attacked Egypt and destroyed large portions of Port Said. The canal was returned to Egypt after the United States disapproved of the action. For the following ten years, the canal was operated by Egypt who paid an amount to the Suez Canal Company for its use. In 1967, another war with Israel arose and the canal was made impassable with scuttled ships. The canal would not reopen until 1975 after the Camp David Accord. Traffic through the canal began to fall in the early 1980s after petroleum pipelines eroded ship traffic business. After the company became defunct in the late 1990s, the canal was generating $2 billion a year in revenue for Egypt.

== Development after 1956 ==
Following the Suez Crisis, the Suez Company reinvented itself as a diversified investment firm. In 1959, it established a banking subsidiary, the Banque de la Compagnie Financière de Suez, renamed Banque de Suez et de l'Union des mines in 1966 following Suez's combination with financier Jack Francès's conglomerate, Union des mines–La Hénin. That bank merged in 1975 with the Banque de l'Indochine to form Banque Indosuez, which the Suez Company eventually sold to Crédit Agricole in 1996. Meanwhile, in 1972 the Suez Company acquired control of another bank, Crédit Industriel et Commercial, which it relinquished in the 1980s.

Following its nationalization in 1982 and privatization in 1987, the Suez Company in 1988 successfully participated in a takeover battle for control of the Société Générale de Belgique, which significantly broadened its portfolio of activities.

== Paris headquarters building ==
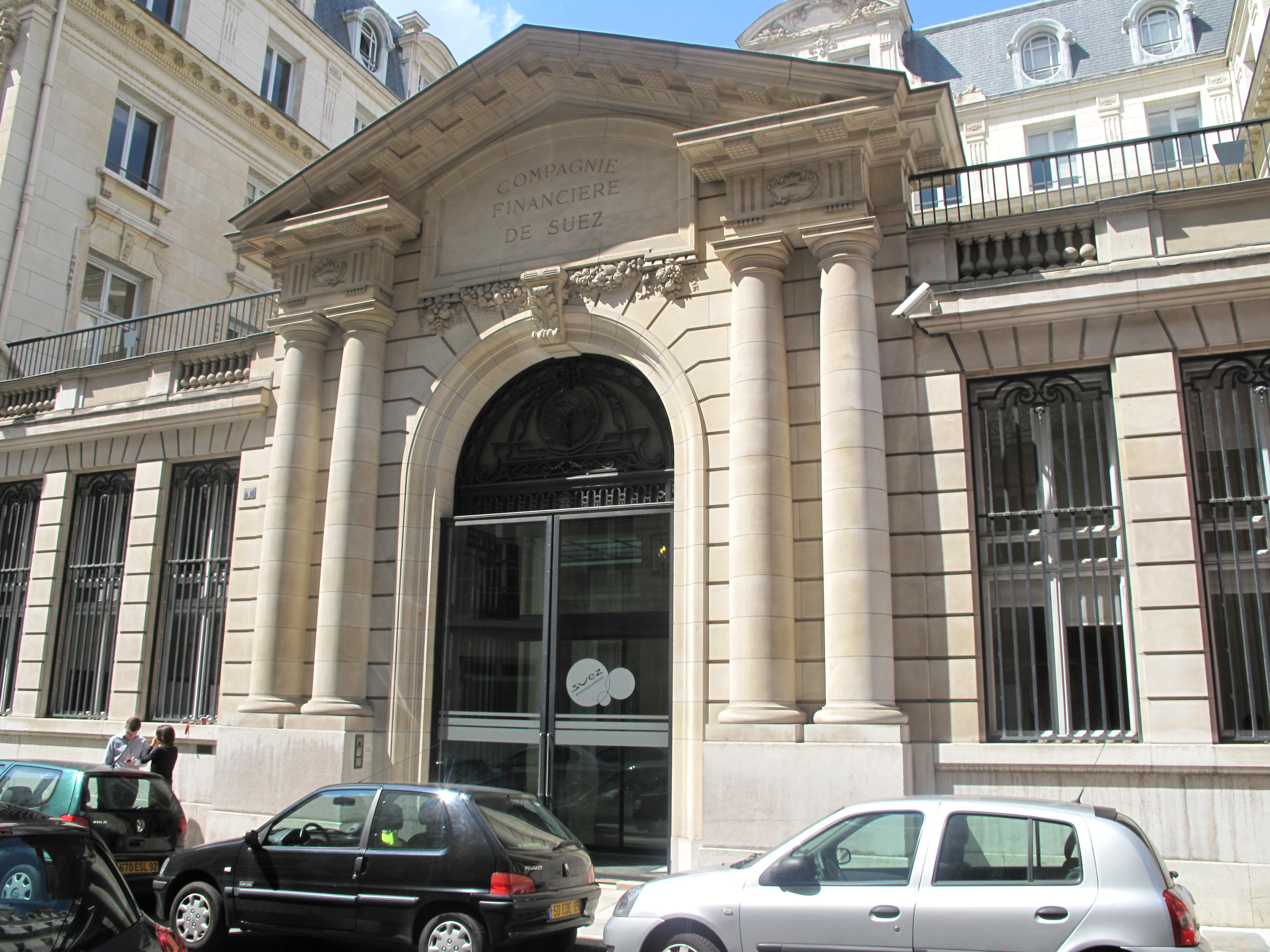
Portal of the headquarters building in 2010, before the company's name was erased

The opulent building at 1, rue d'Astorg was built for the Suez canal Company in 1911-1913 on a design by architect Henri Paul Nénot. The Suez Company was long known colloquially as the "old lady of the rue d'Astorg" (French: la vieille dame de la rue d'Astorg) with reference to its headquarters address.

Following the Suez Company's merger with Lyonnaise des eaux, it was sold to the real estate arm of General Electric and renovated in the early 2000s. In 2006, a museum dedicated to the Suez Canal history was created in the former board room, on the initiative of the heritage nonprofit Association du Souvenir de Ferdinand de Lesseps et du Canal de Suez. Since May 2015, it has been the Parisian office of the law firm Clifford Chance.

== Chairmen ==
- Ferdinand de Lesseps (1855 – 7 December 1894)
- Jules Guichard (17 December 1892 – 17 July 1896) (acting for de Lesseps to 7 December 1894)
- Auguste-Louis-Albéric, prince d'Arenberg (3 August 1896 – 1913)
- Charles Jonnart (19 May 1913 – 1927)
- Louis de Vogüé (4 April 1927 – 1 March 1948)
- François Charles-Roux (4 April 1948 – 1957)
- Jacques Georges-Picot (1957 – May 1971)
- Michel Caplain (May 1971 – May 1981)
- Philippe Malet (May 1981 – February 1982)
- Georges Plescoff (February 1982 – March 1983)
- Jean Peyrelevade (March 1983 – July 1986)
- Renaud de La Genière (July 1986 – October 1990)
- Gérard Worms (October 1990 – July 1995)
- Gérard Mestrallet (July 1995 – June 1997)

== See also ==
- Emancipation reform of 1861
- Panic of 1873
- Port Said Lighthouse
- 1948 Arab–Israeli War
- Yellow Fleet
- Suez (company, 1997–2008)
- Suez (company, 2015)

== Sources ==
- Brown, Nathan J. (1994). "Who abolished corvée labour in Egypt and why?". Past & Present. 144: 116–137. doi:10.1093/past/144.1.116.
- "European Business History Association 2007 Research Paper Webpage" (PDF). ebha.org. 2007.
- Fitzgerald, Percy (1876). "The Great Canal at Suez (Volume II)". Tinsley Brothers.
- "French Army breaks a one-day strike and stands on guard against a land-hungry Italy". Life. 19 December 1938.
- Karabell, Zachary (2003). Parting the desert: the creation of the Suez Canal. Alfred A. Knopf. ISBN 0-375-40883-5.
