= Delta Barrage =

Former dam in Egypt

Coordinates: 30.1843°N 31.1166°E

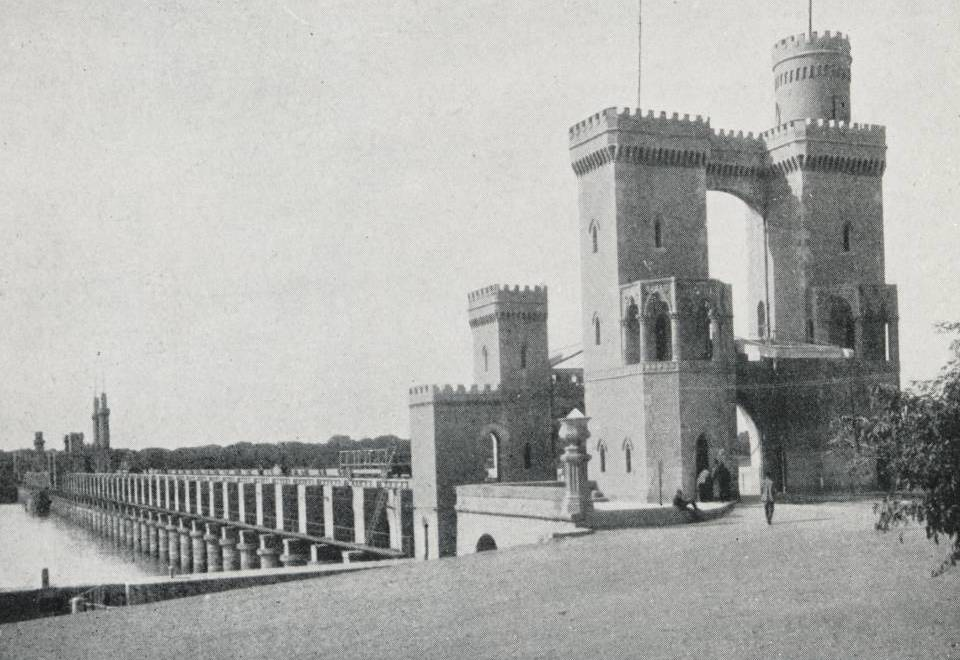
The Nile Barrage, as it was termed, in 1906

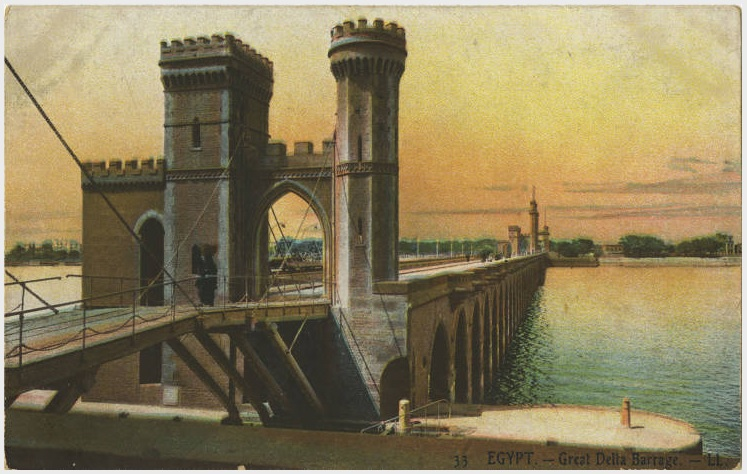
Nile Barrage

The Delta Barrage is a barrage-type dam constructed intermittently from 1833 to 1862. Its purpose was to improve irrigation and navigation along the main Rosetta and Damietta branches of the Nile downstream of the point where they divide north of Cairo, Egypt. At its first operation however, the structure's foundations were found to be of such poor quality that its main irrigation purpose had to be largely abandoned for safety reasons. The barrages have been much maligned as only a romantic river crossing.

Despite its ignoble beginnings, initial testing and later repairs were undertaken in the 1880s following the British occupation of Egypt. These repairs and their continued maintenance would largely provide the barrages' original intent. The overall effects were largely unexpected and startling. In addition to a great reduction in costs of lifting water to irrigate fields, and labor savings needed to unclog the canals from deposited silt, the cotton crop was doubled, and the costs needed to raise crops in general was cut in half. These combined factors would stimulate demand for agricultural land which saw a doubling in price and an immediate demand which could not be satisfied.

In the 1930s, when the idea for a larger, higher and stronger barrage was put forward, the old barrage was leaking again and the maintenance expenses required were of such magnitude, that the building of a new barrage was determined to be more feasible. A contract was awarded through public tender to the British firm of Messrs. McDonald Gibbs & Co. (Engineers). Construction of the new Mohammed Ali Barrage lasted from 1936 to 1939. The completed dam was inaugurated in December 1939. Due to technological advances, its foundation was built in steel piling and concrete cement encrusted several meters below the sandy base. Granite from Aswan was also used for part of the body. The project works were a great success, entailing a work force of twelve thousand and cost 2.75 million pounds. The old Delta Barrage was then abandoned, although it has been retained as a historic monument and is still used as a road bridge.

American diplomat Edwin de Leon reported that Muhammad Ali's grandson Abbas was willing to sacrifice one of the pyramids in order to complete the poorly financed dam, but this was avoided by the high estimated cost, provided by the engineer.

== See also ==
- Barthélemy Prosper Enfantin
- Charles Joseph Lambert
- Louis Maurice Adolphe Linant de Bellefonds
- Eugène Mougel
- Colin Scott-Moncrieff
