= Eugène Mougel =

French engineer (1808–1890)

- Born: 27 November 1808; Châtel-sur-Moselle
- Died: 27 November 1890 (aged 82); Paris
- Citizenship: France
- Education: École Polytechnique
- Occupation: Engineer
- Known for: Suez Canal
- Works: Nile Barrage
- Awards: Knight of the Legion of Honour (June 26, 1844); Title of Bey

Dieudonné Eugène Mougel aka Eugène Mougel Bey (27 November 1808 in Châtel-sur-Moselle – 27 November 1890 in Paris) was a French engineer graduated from the École Polytechnique and later working for the Egyptian administration.

== Biography ==
He built the Nile Barrage near Cairo, a project initially started by Louis Maurice Adolphe Linant de Bellefonds, and contributed as general supervisor to the initial phases of the Suez Canal works. Mougel was chief engineer for the Suez Canal Company from 1859 to 1861, where he worked with superintendent Alphonse Hardon to plan the mobilization infrastructure to build the Suez Canal: the freshwater access canals, freshwater distilleries, and early hand-digging operations. He was listed by Ferdinand de Lesseps as a founder of the Suez Canal Company.
