= Colin Scott-Moncrieff =

British engineer and soldier

Colonel Sir Colin Scott-Moncrieff
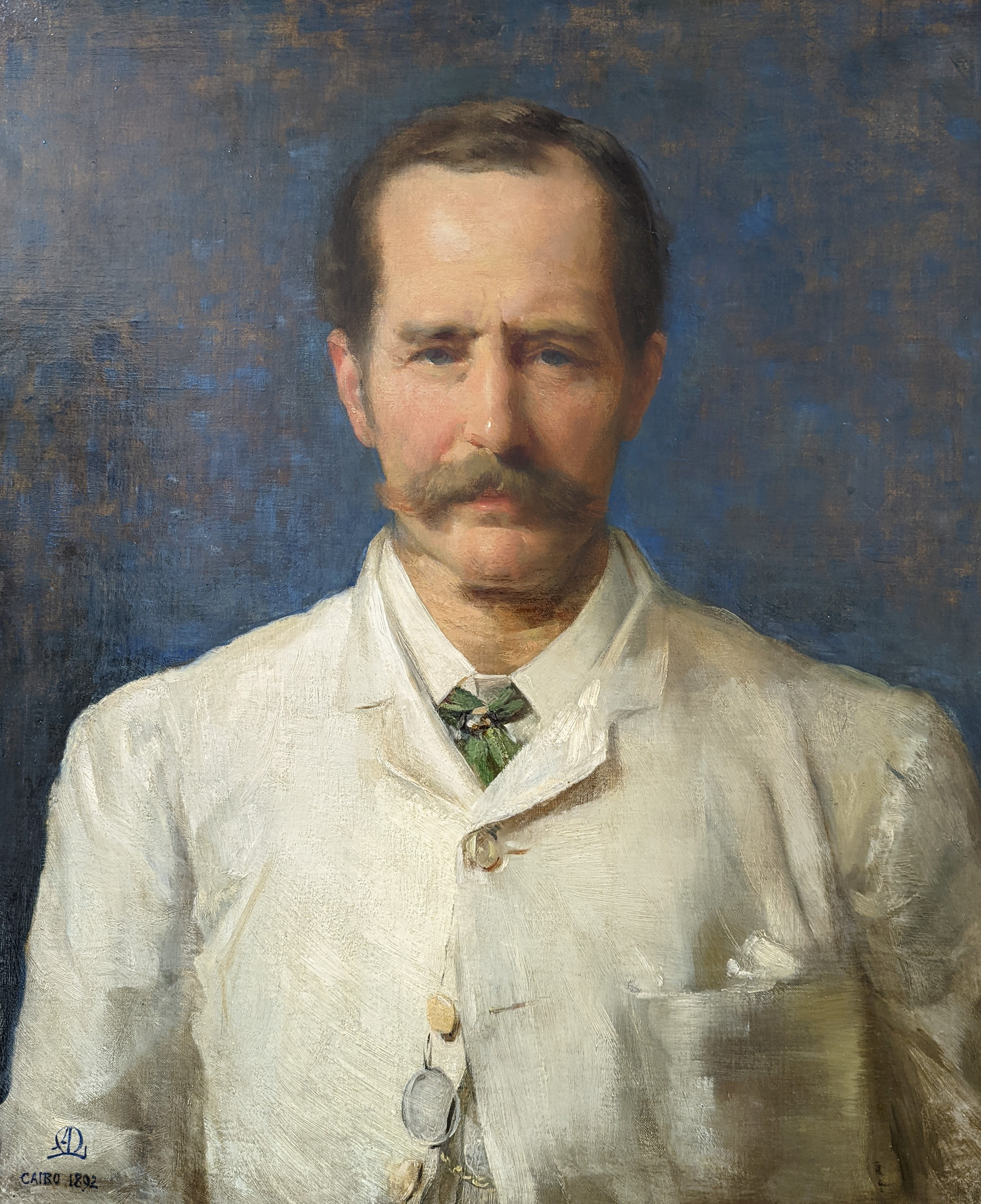
- Born: 3 August 1836
- Died: 6 April 1916 (aged 79)
- Military career
- Allegiance: British Empire
- Branch: British Army
- Rank: Colonel
- Unit: Corps of Royal Engineers

Colonel Sir Colin Campbell Scott-Moncrieff KCSI KCMG (3 August 1836 – 6 April 1916) was a British engineer, soldier and civil servant, best known for repairing the Nile Barrage and reorganizing the irrigation system of Egypt in the 1880s.

== Early life and India ==
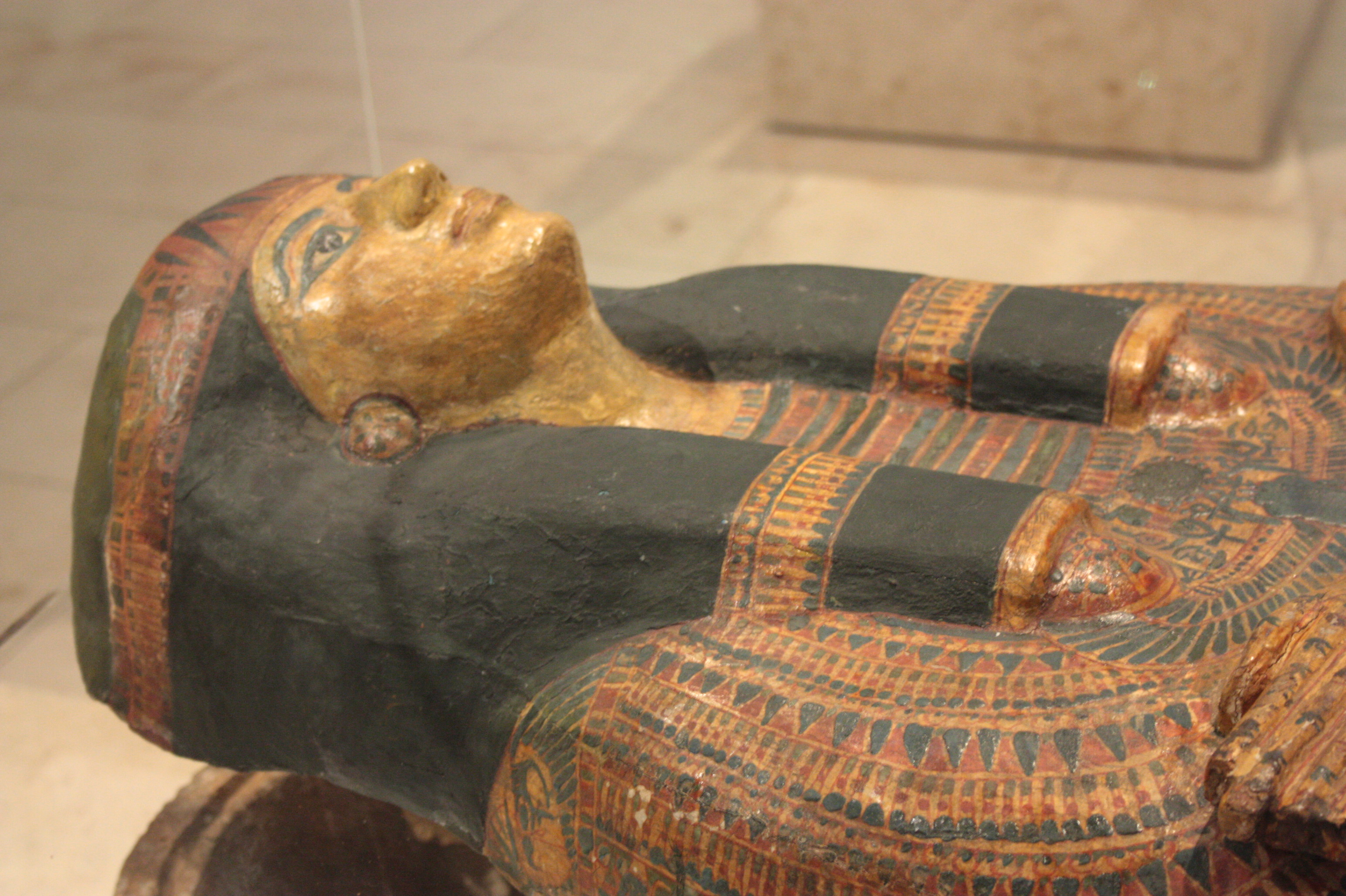
The lid of coffin base and mummy of senior priest Iufenamun; the lid in fact belonged to another coffin (of Tjentweretheqau, his grandmother), presented by Colin Scott-Moncrieff to the Royal Scottish Museum

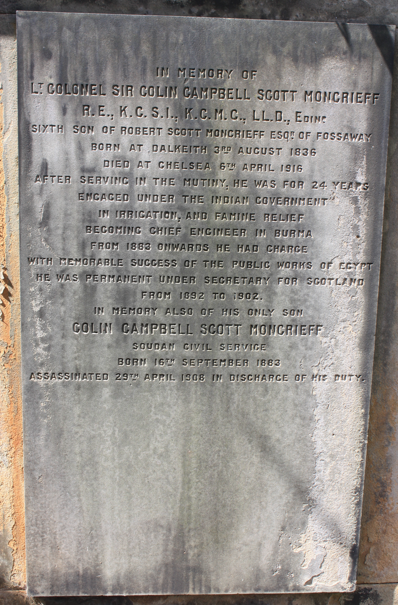
The grave of Colin Campbell Scott Moncrieff, Greyfriars Kirkyard

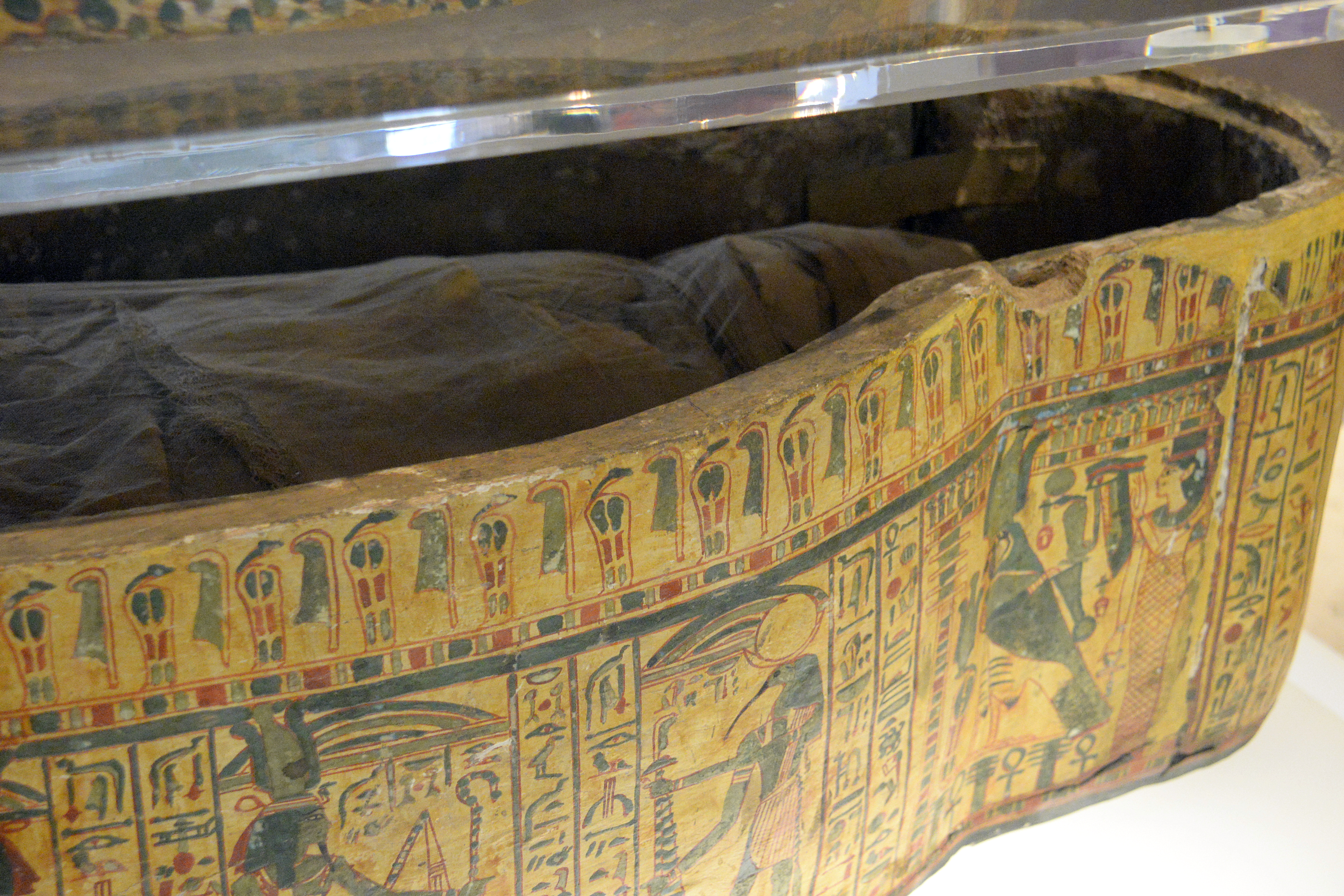
Detail. Coffin base and mummy of priest Iufenamun. From Egypt. Presented by Colin Scott-Moncrieff. National Museum of Scotland

Scott-Moncrieff was born in 1836, the son of Robert Scott Moncrieff. After training at the East India Company's establishment in Addiscombe, he was commissioned into the Bengal Engineers, party of the Company's private army which was soon integrated into the British army.

He arrived in India in 1858, and was involved in clearing-up operations after the Indian Rebellion of 1857, but was soon employed in the Indian irrigation system, becoming Chief Engineer of the Jumna Canal, then Superintending Engineer of the Ganges Canal from 1869–77, and Chief Engineer of Burma until 1883. He was appointed a Companion of the Order of the Star of India in 1878.

== Egypt ==
Retiring with the honorary rank of Colonel, on his way home he was summoned to Cairo to meet Lord Dufferin who offered him "the keys of the Nile" – the position of Director of Irrigation for Egypt, then still nominally part of the Ottoman Empire, but in practice controlled by the British.

His first priority was the Nile Barrage, designed to retain water to irrigate the Delta, which had been built at great expense between 1843 and 1862 but soon abandoned when cracks appeared in its structure. Scott Moncrieff arranged for a trial closing of the gates allowing a limited operation, while carefully monitoring the cracks. The results were so successful in terms of improved agricultural yield that he was able to ask for, and get, a million pounds for a complete repair and strengthening of the Barrage, which was carried out between 1885 and 90. Over a period of nine years he reorganised the whole irrigation system and "was so successful in improving the whole irrigation system that Egypt, from being a bankrupt country, became comparatively flourishing". For his work in Egypt he was appointed KCMG.

== After Egypt ==
Scott-Moncrieff returned to Britain in 1892 and served as Under-Secretary for Scotland from 1892 to 1902.

From 1901 to 1903, at the invitation of Lord Curzon, the Viceroy, Scott-Moncrieff served as President of a Commission to investigate and report on the prospects for further developing the Indian irrigation system. For this work he was promoted to a Knight Commander of the Order of the Star of India (KCSI) in the 1903 Durbar Honours.

His great-nephew was C.K. Scott-Moncrieff, the famed first translator into English of Proust's Remembrance of Things Past.
