= Dual control (politics) =

Dual control is the situation in which a national government agrees to share control of its country with representatives of foreign governments, called controllers, because it is indebted to them.

== Examples ==
- Egypt, which was indebted to European powers after the completion of the Suez Canal and thus forced to accept controllers in its government in the 1870s.

== See also ==
- Dual power, in which a revolutionary force attempts to provide alternative government services
