= Louis Maurice Adolphe Linant de Bellefonds =

Explorer and chief engineer of the Suez Canal (1798–1883)

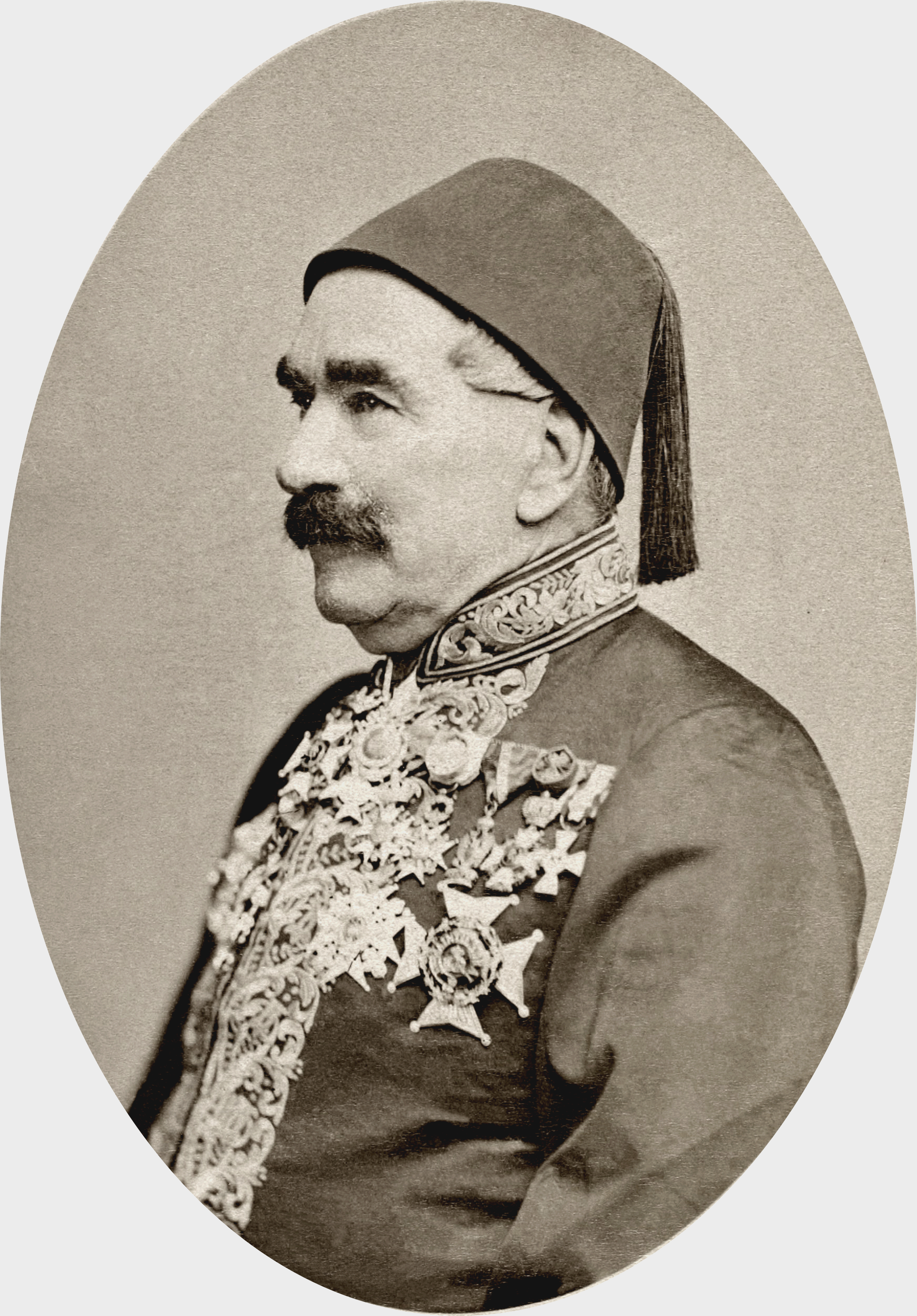
- Born: 23 November 1799; Lorient, France
- Died: 9 July 1883 (aged 83); Cairo, Egypt
- Citizenship: France
- Occupation: Engineer
- Known for: Suez Canal
- Awards: Title of Pasha

Louis Maurice Adolphe Linant de Bellefonds better known as Linant Pasha (Lorient, France, 23 November 1799 – Cairo 9 July 1883) was an explorer of Egypt and, as the chief engineer of Egypt's public works, 1831–1869, an influential engineer of the Suez Canal. He is listed as a founder of the Suez Canal Company.

== Biography ==
Having taken advantage of a sound education that emphasized mathematics, drawing and painting, then having been given some experience at sea through the efforts of his father, Antoine-Marie, a naval officer, charting the coastal waters of Newfoundland, in 1814, aged fifteen. Having passed his entrance exams, young Linant embarked as a naval cadet on the frigate Cléopâtre, engaged on a mission to Greece, Syria, Palestine and Egypt, which he spent making drawings and doing relief mapping. One of the artists attached to the expedition having suddenly died, Linant was commissioned to replace him, drawing sites and ruins in Athens, Constantinople, Ephesus, Akka and Jerusalem. At Jaffa the expedition reached Damiatta by camel caravan, then sailed up the Nile to disembark at Cairo in December. The expedition was completed, but Linant decided not to return to France, and through a recommendation from the comte de Forbin, the expedition's director, briefly entered the service of the viceroy of Egypt, Muhammad Ali, before setting out on a series of explorations that lasted from 1818 to 1830, which he described later in his Mémoires.

In 1818–19, he was in lower Nubia, beyond the Cataracts of the Nile. In 1820, he joined the expedition of the French consul general and explorer Bernardino Drovetti to the oasis of Siwa in the Libyan Desert, where the oracle of Ammon had been consulted by Alexander the Great but to which no modern European had penetrated; his drawings illustrated the Voyage à l'Oasis de Syouah, published by E. Jomard (1823). Within a few months he travelled with the Italian Alessandro Ricci to Sinai: the party left Cairo and followed the peninsula's eastern coast, passing through the Wells of Moses, Wadi Gharandel and Khazne Firaoun, to arrive at Maghara, where they made copies of the hieroglyphic inscriptions. Their intention to reach Petra was foiled by the insecurity of the area, but in returning to Cairo they passed through Sarbout el-Khadem and sketched its monuments. This first trip to Sinai enabled him to establish contacts with the Bedouin and prepare himself for the successful trip to Petra finally undertaken with Léon de Laborde in 1828.

Meantime he visited the Fayum in 1821, then was sent by the Englishman William John Bankes to the Sudan commissioned to get geographical information and draw the monuments there. He was gone from Cairo thirteen months from June 1821, discovering the ruins at Messaourat and at Naqa, only slightly in advance of Frédéric Cailliaud, the first European to reach Meroe.

In 1824, Linant spent a couple of months in London, where the African Company proposed to support him in a voyage of exploration, as they had supported Burckhardt. After further travels in Nubia and Sudan, in 1827 he set out funded by the Association, to make his way as far up the White Nile as could be, in search of the fabled source of the Nile: tribal hostility forced him back at 13 degrees north latitude. In 1831 the Société de Géographie of Paris commissioned a further attempt, which was postponed by the viceroy, who sent him instead to find the gold mines in Atbai.

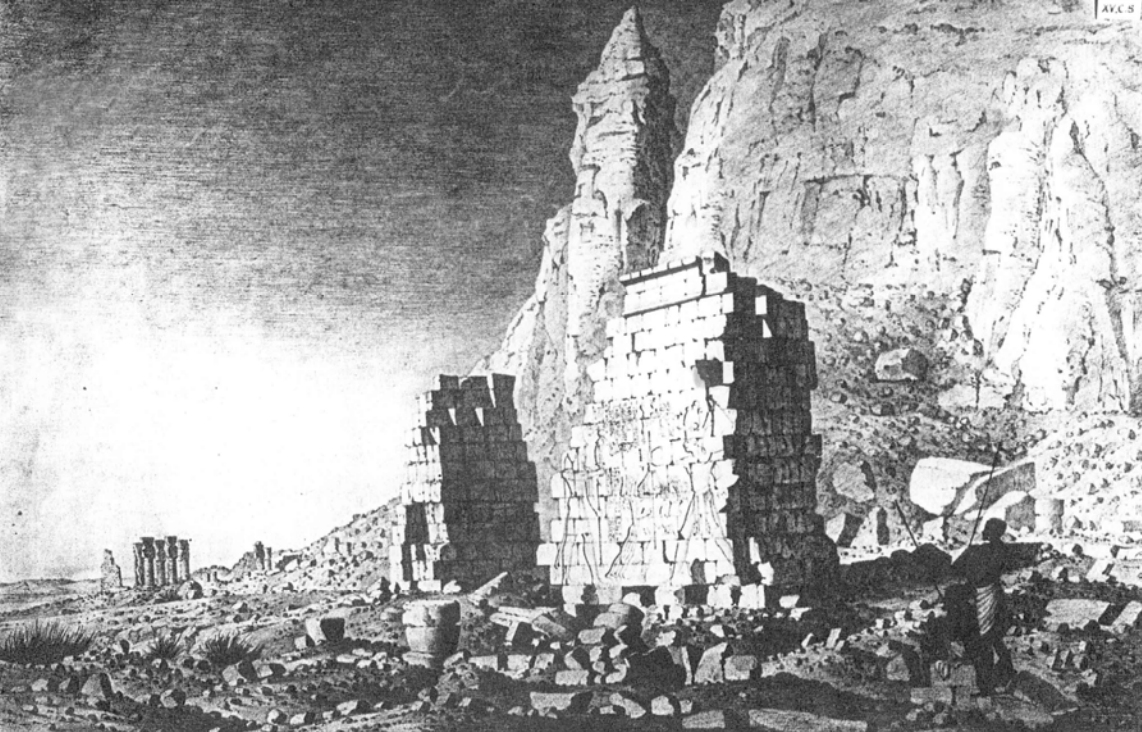
Ruins of Temple B700 of Jebel Barkal with relief of Senkamanisken clubbing enemies, drawn in 1821 by Louis Maurice Adolphe Linant de Bellefonds

In these travel Linant did not completely lose sight of his early experience in hydrology. In the Sinai in 1822 he had noted the traces of Trajan's canal, and had visited Suez and the peninsula's other lakes, and later he had roamed the Eastern Desert between the Nile and the Red Sea. "In 1827 and 1828" he wrote later, "I returned once more to the Isthmus, which I visited once again and its environs, and it was then that I began the first studies of a project of communication between the two seas." These projects he discussed with Laborde as they recrossed the peninsula on the way to Petra in 1828. There is a valley in the Sinai, once his contracts with the African Association were successfully terminated, Linant "passed more than a year alone with a choice library in order to study seriously and without distractions in order to acquire what I lacked in scientific understanding to take up service with the Egyptian government in the character of an engineer."

=== Linant as engineer ===
At his return to Cairo in 1831, Linant was named chief engineer of the public works of Upper Egypt, a position that associated him in a long and fruitful career with most of the great works of modernizing Egypt's network of irrigation canals, the grand levées along the Nile. By 1837, fully in charge of public works in the Ministry of Public Instruction, he received the title of bey.

All along, the idea of a communication between the Mediterranean and the Red Sea never left him. From 1830, he was expressing his ideas, first with the consul general of France, then with Ferdinand de Lesseps. In 1841, he submitted a preliminary plan for a canal to the Compagnie Péninsulaire et Orientale and in 1844, set before Lesseps his complete plans. In 1854 Lesseps obtained from the viceroy Muhammad Sa'id the firman for the canal concession on behalf of the Compagnie universelle du canal maritime de Suez, and Linant was named chief engineer, in which capacity he was soon assisted by the French hydraulics engineer Mougel, for Linant continued in charge of public works, as director general (1862), as Minister of Public Works (1869) and member of the viceroy's council.

He retired in 1869 to write his vast memoir. He was elected an International Member of the American Philosophical Society. In June 1873, the viceroy conferred upon him the title of pasha. He died leaving a vast accumulation of notes, memoirs, drawings, most of which remain unedited. A great number of visiting Europeans left their impressions of Linant.

== Publications ==
- Mémoires sur les principaux travaux d'utilité publique exécutés en Egypte depuis les temps de la plus haute antiquité jusqu'à nos jours (Paris, 1872–1873).
- L'Etbaye ou pays habité par les arabes Bichariehs : Géographie, ethnologie, mines d'or (Paris, 1868)

See also:

- Egypt in the European imagination

== Books on The Linant de Bellefonds ==
- Yasser OMAR AMINE, The Forgotten Memory of the History of the Egyptian Copyright Law : the jurist M. Linant de Bellefonds, M. Pupikofer and E. Piola Caselli (La mémoire oubliée de l'histoire du droit d'auteur égyptien : Les juristes M. Linant de Bellefonds, M. Pupikofer et E. Piola Caselli), Publisher Dar El Nahda El Arabia, Cairo, 2014–2015, 602 p. (in Arabic and part in French).
