= 1920 Argyll by-election =

UK parliamentary by-election

The 1920 Argyllshire by-election was a parliamentary by-election held for the British House of Commons constituency of Argyllshire on 10 March 1920.

== Vacancy ==
The by-election was caused by the appointment of the sitting Coalition Liberal MP Sir William Sutherland as a Lord of the Treasury. This was an office of appointment under the Crown which enabled Sutherland to take up the post of Scottish Liberal whip but under the constitutional requirements of the day it meant he had to resign and fight a by-election.

== Candidates ==
As the candidate of the Liberal-Conservative coalition government Sutherland had no Unionist opponent. Neither did he face opposition by the Independent Asquithian Liberals, who chose not to stand a candidate. He was however opposed by the Reverend M MacCallum of Muckairn, Oban for Labour.

== Issues ==
Reverend MacCallum was reported as being not only the representative of the Labour Party but also of the Highland Land League. Another candidate representing the Labour and the Highland Land League had been Sutherland's only opponent in Argyllshire at the 1918 general election. Sutherland was fighting on the record of the Coalition government. Given this was a straight fight between the Coalition and Labour, it is little surprise that Sutherland sought to portray it as a struggle against socialism and nationalisation and that MacCallum played up the issue of community control against the vested interests ranged against the working class.

== The result ==
The press reported there was little excitement in the constituency on polling day. Perhaps because the combined Liberal and Conservative votes were substantial there seemed little likelihood of an upset. Because of the scattered geography of the constituency it took until 24 March to get all the ballots collected and counted and the result formally declared. Sutherland held the seat with a reduced majority but Labour had nearly doubled its share of the vote.

William Sutherland

1920 Argyll by-election Electorate
Party		Candidate	Votes	%	±%
C	Liberal	William Sutherland	10,187	64.9	−16.5
	Labour	Malcolm MacCallum	5,498	35.1	New
Majority			4,689	29.8	−33.0
Turnout			15,685	50.2	−1.8
	Liberal hold		Swing		
C indicates candidate endorsed by the coalition government.

== See also ==
- Lists of United Kingdom by-elections
- United Kingdom by-election records
- Argyllshire
