= Wedding of Nora Robinson and Alexander Kirkman Finlay =

Australian vice-regal wedding

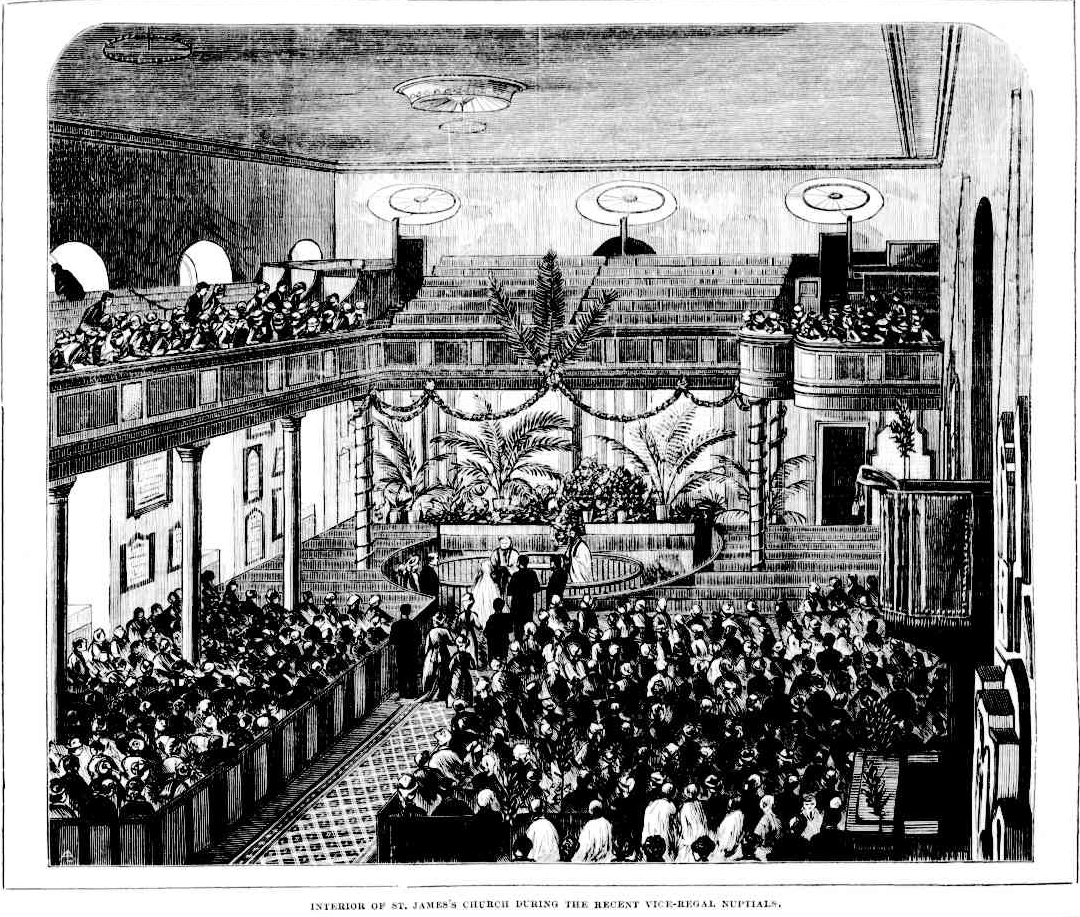
The wedding of Nora Augusta Maud Robinson and Alexander Kirkman Finlay on 7 August 1878, in St James' Church, Sydney

The wedding register, listing Finlay as a bachelor born in Scotland living at Glenorminston, Victoria and Robinson as a spinster born in St Kitts, living at Government House, Sydney, the service having been performed according to the Rites of the Church of England.

The wedding of Nora Augusta Maud Robinson with Alexander Kirkman Finlay, of Glenormiston, was solemnised in St James' Church, Sydney, on Wednesday, 7 August 1878 by the Rev. Canon Allwood, assisted by Rev. Hough. The bride was the second daughter of the governor of New South Wales, Sir Hercules Robinson, GCMG, and Nea Arthur Ada Rose D'Amour Annesley, fifth daughter of The 10th Viscount Valentia. The groom, owner of Glenormiston, a large station in Victoria, was the second son of Alexander Struthers Finlay, of Castle Toward, Argyleshire, Scotland.

As this was only the second vice-regal wedding to take place in the colony, it generated enormous public interest. The crowd, estimated at between 8,000 and 10,000, thronged the streets outside the church and a large body of police had trouble preserving order. The wedding was attended by the most important members of Sydney society at the time - leaders, administrators, officials, legislators, naval officers, lawyers and aristocrats, many of whom had Scottish connections. There was extensive coverage in the press around the country, including in The Sydney Morning Herald, The Queanbeyan Age, the South Australian Register, the Australian Town and Country Journal, The Argus, The Wagga Wagga Daily Advertiser and the Riverine Herald.

== Wedding service ==
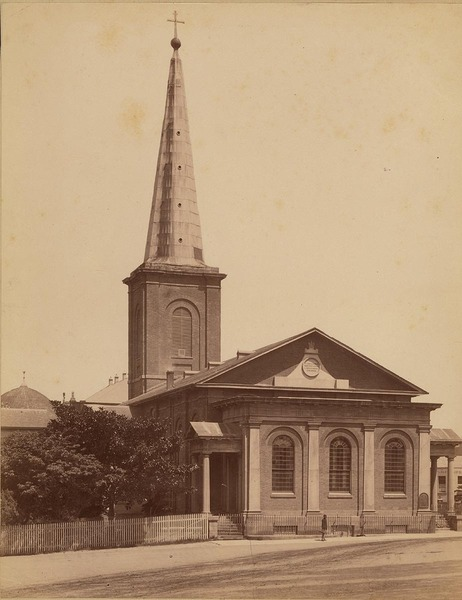
St James' Church (1880s) by Charles Bayliss

The first carriages to arrive at the church brought Lady Robinson, Mrs. St. John, Captain St. John, A.D.C., and H. S. Lyttleton, private secretary. The following carriage contained the bridegroom and Captain Standish (chief-commissioner of police in Victoria) as best man. The carriage containing the bride, her father, (the governor) and the bridesmaids (Miss Nereda Robinson and Miss Neva St. John) came immediately afterwards. The people cheered the arrival of each carriage.

The service was performed by Canon Allwood, who was assisted by Rev. Hough. Inside St James', the church was decorated with plants and flowers, which had come from the Botanic Gardens, including "palms, tree ferns, crotons, dracoenas, dieffenbachia, and pandanas, and immediately in front was a number of richest orchids and ferns. Among the former were vandas, graccelebium, and a Graeceum sesquapedale and superpetam, which will at once be recognised by florists as among the richest we have here ..."

The Robinson-Finlay bridal party arrived at the church shortly before 1 o'clock. The bridegroom was accompanied by his best man, Captain Standish, Chief Commissioner of Police in Victoria, and the bride entered the church leaning on the arm of her father, the governor of New South Wales. The service was accompanied by music provided by a choir and the organ and the bridal couple departing to the music of a wedding march. The bells of the nearby St Mary's Cathedral were rung (St James' had no bells at the time).

=== Wedding breakfast and honeymoon ===
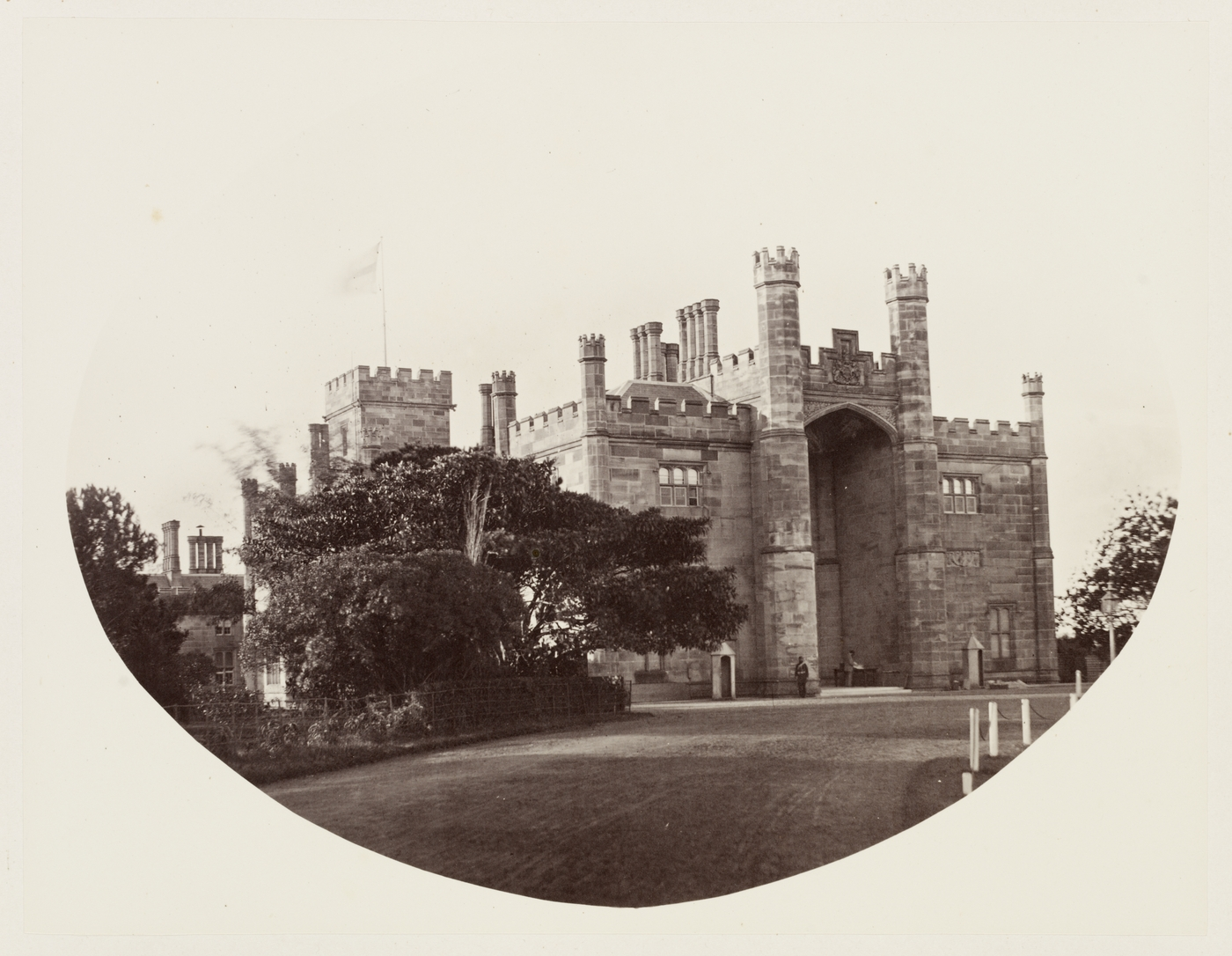
Government House in 1872

The wedding breakfast took place at Government House where the toast to the bride and groom was given by Sir Alfred Stephen, followed by other toasts.

The carriage containing the couple left Government House at about four o'clock, the travelling costume of the bride being a princess dress of dark-brown silk trimmed with blue, with bonnet and parasol of the same material." They spent their honeymoon at Eurimbla, Botany, at a house lent to them.

== Wedding party ==
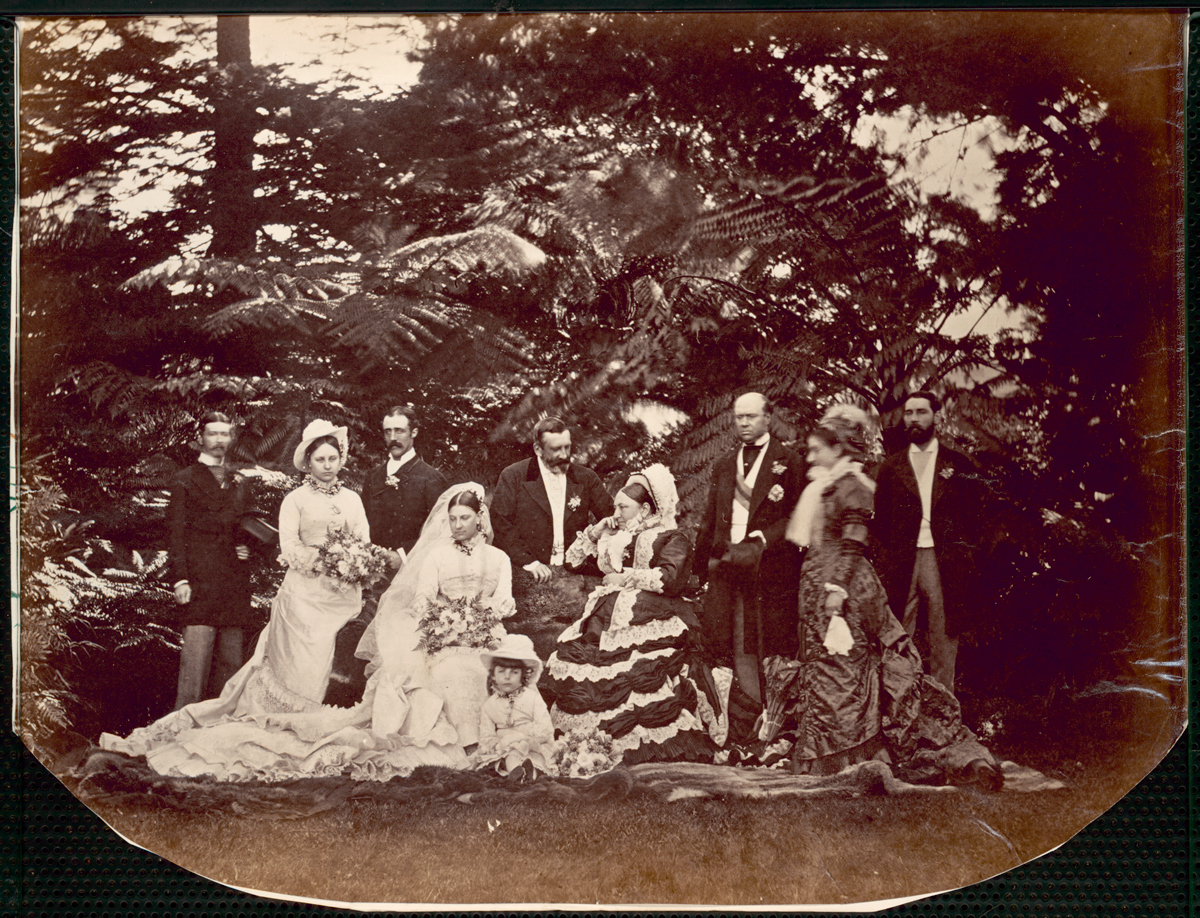
The wedding party. The bride (Nora Robinson) and her mother (Lady Nea Robinson) are seated. Sir Hercules Robinson (the bride's father) stands third from the right; the bride's mother sits fourth from the right; the groom (A.K. Finlay) stands third from the left.

The wedding party consisted of the bride and bride groom, the bridesmaids—Miss Nereda Robinson and Miss Neva St. John—the governor, the Lady Robinson, Captain St. John, A.D.C., Mrs St. John, and H. Littleton, private secretary; Sir John Hay and Lady Hay, Sir George W. Allen and Lady Allen, Sir Alfred and Lady Stephen, Sir George and Lady Innes, Sir William and Lady Manning, Commodore Hoskins, R.N., and several officers of HMS Wolverine. Commodore Hoskins had married Dorothea Ann Eliza Robinson, daughter of Sir George Stamp Robinson, 7th Baronet (1797–1873). Miss Deas-Thompson was still a parishioner of St James' in 1900.

=== Attire ===
The bride wore a train of the rich old English brocatelle over white ottoman silk, trimmed with flounces of Brussels lace and crepe-leece. Her head dress comprised a very long soft tulle veil, and a wreath composed of orange blossoms, intermixed with flowers in compliment to the Scottish bridegroom: heather and myrtle.

== Public reaction ==
There was intense public interest in the event, the second vice-regal wedding in the history of the colony. Its predecessor was the marriage of Sir Edward Deas Thomson, C.B., K.C.M.G., with the daughter of Governor Sir Richard Bourke. The press reported that eight to ten thousand onlookers "...thronged King street from Macquarie Street to Elizabeth Street, and gave a large body of police great trouble to preserve order ... the crushing and screaming were almost continuous".

King-street from Elizabeth-street to Macquarie-street, was thronged, and it became exceedingly difficult for the police, who were present in considerable force under Mr. sub-inspector Anderson, to preserve anything like order. Not only was the street thronged, but the balconies and the windows of the houses opposite the church were filled with sight-seers, the stone wall and railings enclosing the church were thick with people, and even the roof of the Supreme Court gave footing or a precarious support to adventurous individuals who were determined to see all that could be seen of the viceregal wedding. The crushing towards the church gates was enough to endanger life and limb. The persistent efforts made by the crowd to get within the railed enclosure caused the churchwardens to lock the gates, and to refuse, for some time, admittance to anybody, and even the guests specially invited to witness the marriage ceremony were subjected to much inconvenience and delay before they could reach the church doors. This, however, was almost unavoidable, for the crowd and the crushing were such that the severest measures were necessary to prevent the church being rushed by the people.

== Ancestry and family ==
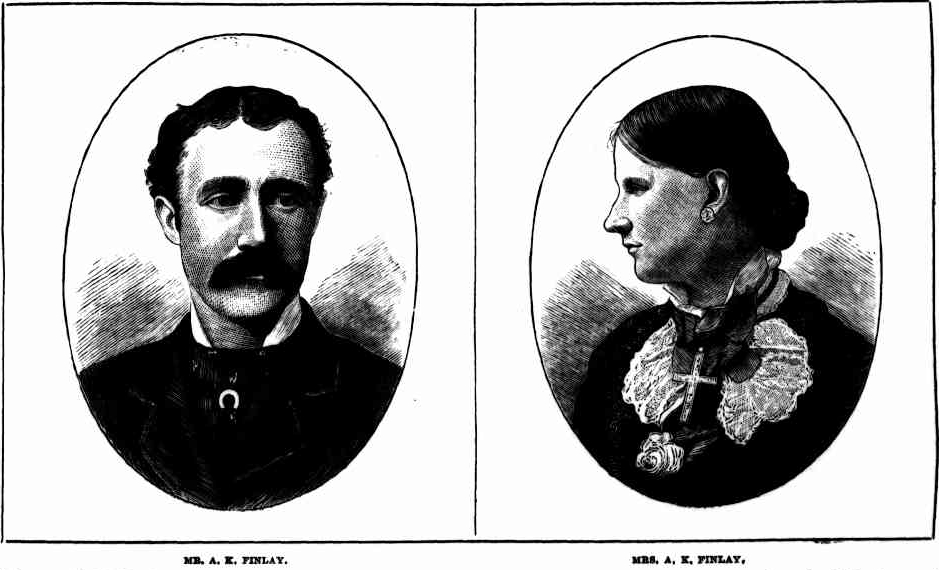
Mr & Mrs A.K. Finlay

=== Bride ===
Nora Robinson was born in St Kitts in the West Indies in 1858 during the period that her father was governor of the island (from 1855 to 1859).

The bride's father, Sir Hercules Robinson, was the governor of New South Wales. Her paternal grandfather was Admiral Hercules Robinson, R.N. The bride's uncle, William Robinson, was three times governor of Western Australia and at the time of Nora's wedding, was governor of the Straits Settlements.

The bride's mother, Lady Robinson, née Nea Arthur Ada Rose D'Amour, was the fifth daughter of the ninth Viscount Valentia.

=== Groom ===
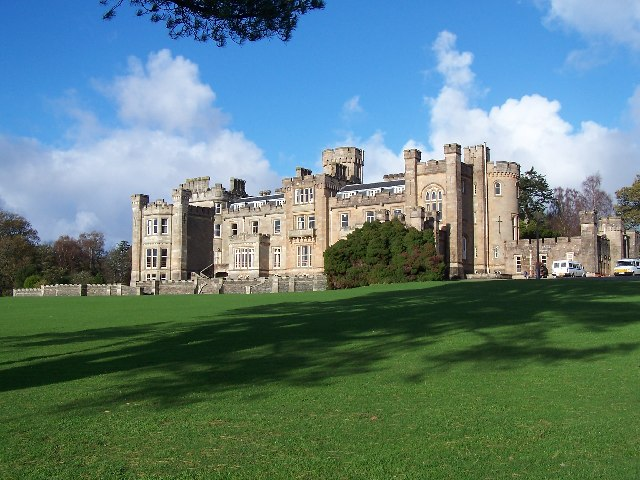
Castle Toward, Scotland

Alexander Kirkman Finlay was the second son of Alexander Struthers Finlay of Castle Toward, Argyllshire and Mrs Finlay in Glasgow, Lanarkshire, born about 1845 and had a brother, Colin Campbell, his elder by one year. His father had represented Argyllshire in Parliament and his grandfather, Kirkman was also a parliamentarian as well as rector of the University of Glasgow in 1817. The elder K. Finlay had acquired the large estate of Auchwhillan, and built Castle Toward on the shores of the Clyde near Dunoon in 1820, to the plans of the architect David Hamilton. He was a pioneer in large-scale afforestation, a cotton trader, chairman of the chamber of commerce who formed the Glasgow East India Association to promote a national campaign for free trade. He was also chairman of the Clyde Navigation Trust and chairman of the Glasgow Gaelic Society and of the Glasgow Highland Society, which encouraged emigration. Alexander arrived in Australia about 1869 after finishing his education at Harrow School and the University of Cambridge.

=== Glenormiston ===
Finlay's property, Glenormiston near Noorat in Victoria, was funded by three wealthy Scots who sent out Highland farmer Niel Black in 1840 to set up its first station near Terang, western Victoria. Black was the son of a Scots farmer who sailed for Australia from Scotland in 1839. He was managing partner of Niel Black and Company, a subsidiary of Gladstone, Serjeantson and Company of Liverpool. The partnership had been formed between him and William Steuart of Glenormiston, Peebleshire, T.S. Gladstone of Gladstone, Serjeantson and Company, Liverpool and the groom's father, A.S. Finlay of Toward Castle, Argyllshire. The company began with a financial backing of £6,000 which was soon increased to £10,000. "In 1840 Niel Black’s men were nearly all Highlanders brought out under the bounty immigration scheme." Melbourne and Adelaide had been linked by telegraph for since December 1857 and graziers like Niel Black found the service "indispensable" for making arrangements about the herds. In 1867, the Duke of Edinburgh (the first member of the royal family to visit Australia), had arrived in the district in late November after visiting Melbourne and sailing to Geelong in his ship the Galatea. He was met by Niel Black and his two sons in full Highland regalia and they escorted him to Glenormiston where a kangaroo shoot had been organised. The Duke had his Highland piper "pipe him into dinner".

Author Anthony Trollope, who travelled extensively in Australia in the 1870s and wrote about each State, said that rich landowners of Victoria erect European country houses "with the addition of a wide verandah". Glenormiston was one of the homesteads where life at the time continued "not only pleasantly, but ... with grace". Trollope's observation was that at this time, life in the Western District must have been like "English country life in the eighteenth century" when the roads were bad, there was great plenty but not luxury, the men were fond of sport, the women stayed at home and looking after the house was done by the mistress and her daughters or the master and his sons rather than by domestics or servants as in England at the time. Trollope commented that "horses are cheap and servants are dear in Victoria".

== Guests ==
Many dignitaries and colonial leaders - important members of Sydney society at the time - including administrators, officials, naval officers, lawyers and aristocrats, attended the ceremony. Among them were: "Hon. Sir Alfred Stephen, C.B., K.C.M.G., M.L.C., Lieutenant Governor, and Lady Stephen; Commodore Hoskins, C.B., A.D.C., and several other naval officers; Colonel Roberts, N.S.W.A.; the Hon. Sir John Hay, K.C.M.G., President of the Legislative Council, and Lady Hay; the Hon., Sir George Wigram Allen, Speaker of the Legislative Assembly, and Lady Allen; His Honor Sir William Manning and Lady Manning; the Hon. Professor Smith C.M.G., M.L.C., and Mrs. Smith; the Hon. R. Molyneaux; the Hon. Sir George Innes M.L.C., and Lady Innes; Mr. Edward Hill, and Mr. Edward Lee".

Notable guests
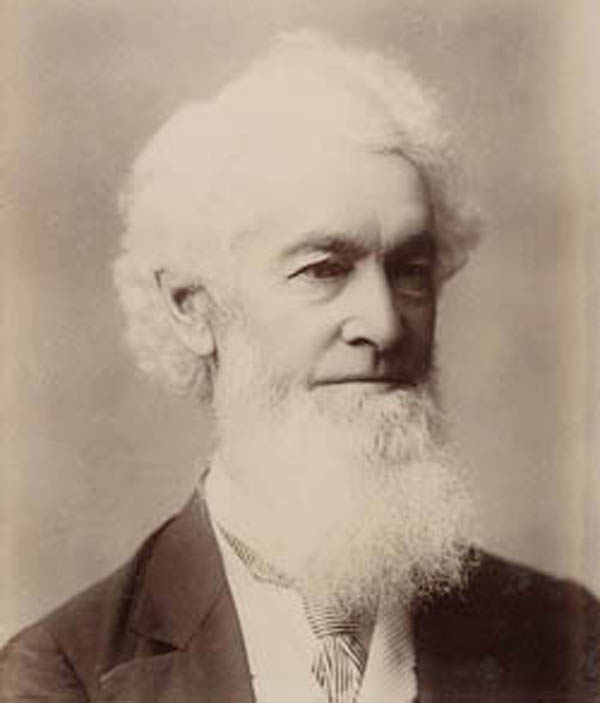
Sir John Hay
(President of the Legislative Council)

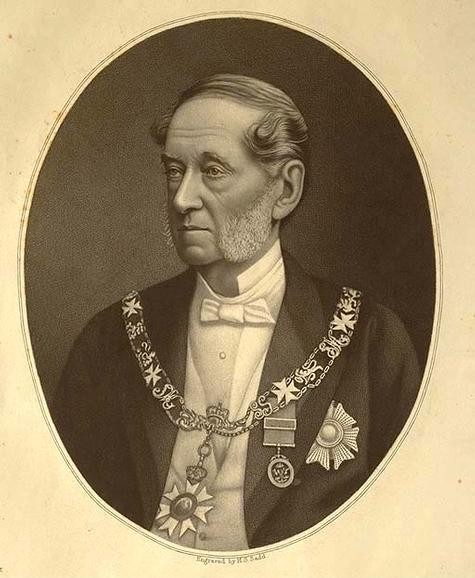
Sir Alfred Stephen
(Lieutenant Governor)

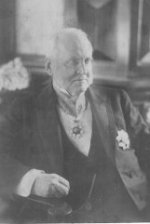
Sir William Manning
(Chancellor of the University of Sydney)

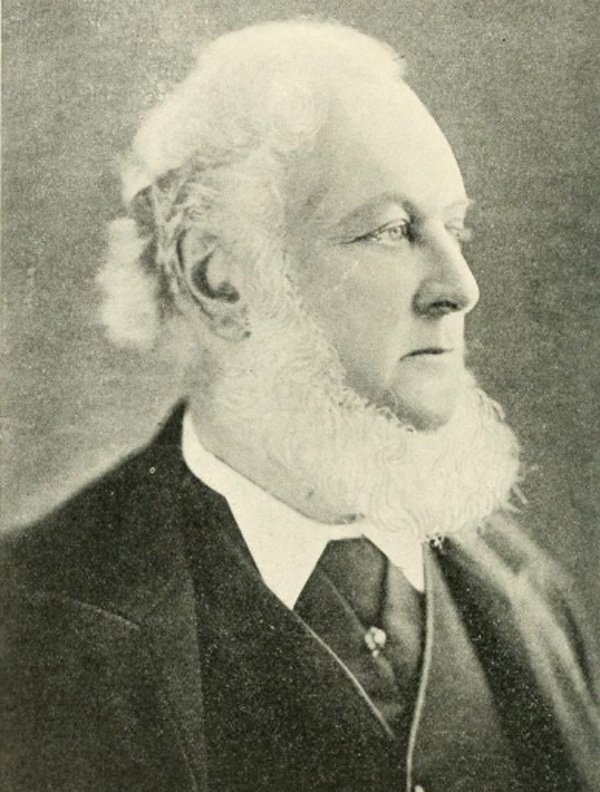
Sir George Wigram Allen
(Speaker of the Legislative Assembly)

== Gifts ==
The wedding presents, detailed in the press along with the names of their givers, were valuable and numerous. The bride's father gave her "a massive gold bracelet" and her mother "a large gold necklace and locket". The best man (Captain Standish) gave solitaire large diamond earrings. Other gifts of jewellery included a gold bracelet and pendant, set with amethyst, diamonds and pearls (from the Hon. Sir George Wigram and Lady Allen); a gold locket with diamond, centre of shamrocks (from Mr. and Mrs. William Gilchrist); a sapphire and diamond ring (from Mrs. Salamon); a diamond bracelet (from the Hon. John Campbell); a gold bracelet set with diamond, sapphire, ruby, and emerald (from the Hon. Sir John Hay and Lady Hay).

The list reveals much about the relationship of the giver to the bridal couple, their social standing and what items were regarded as appropriate, beautiful or useful at the time. For example, the children of some guests, such as Master Robinson and Miss Allwood, gave gifts appropriate to their age. Master Robinson - Hercules Arthur Temple (1866–1933) - Nora's brother, gave a silver pencil case. Miss Allwood's gift was a set of doilies, painted from subjects in Alice's Adventures in Wonderland. The butler at the bride's home (Government House), gave "a handsome butter dish".

Practical gifts included work-baskets, a travelling bag, a biscuit-box, a thimble, an egg-boiler and a photograph-book. Some gifts give a glimpse of items necessary at the time but which are no longer needed or are now less valuable and more disposable. For example, "carved ivory" hair brushes have been replaced by plastic ones; visiting cards, inkstands and riding whips are no longer in regular use.

Some of the gifts and references were consciously Australian. For example, the gift from the Marquis and the Marchioness of Normanby, (the Marquis was at the time governor of New Zealand) of a writing set was made from silver and blackwood, probably the Australian timber Acacia melanoxylon. The gift from Mrs Bladen Neill of a silk dresspiece was noted as "the product of Australian silkworms".

== Subsequent events ==
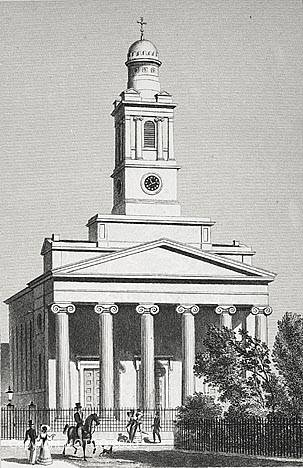
St Peter's Eaton Square, Belgravia, London

The groom returned to Castle Toward, his family home in Scotland, where he died on 29 July 1883 from "phthisis" (now known as tuberculosis), five years after his marriage. He would have been about 38 years old. His will, showing a personal estate of £493 14s. 9d. was proved by his older brother, Colin Campbell Finlay, who was present at Alexander's death and one of his Executors.

Four years later, on 8 September 1887, Nora Finlay married Charles Richard Durant (born about 1854) of the Parish of St James, Piccadilly, at the Parish Church of Eaton Square, London. Her son, Noel Fairfax Durant was born in 1889, while their recorded address was 13 Egerton Gardens, London. She died in London on 31 December 1938, leaving an estate of £124,344 7s. 2d. At the time she was a widow living at 22 Emperors-gate, Kensington.
