= Thomas Ainsworth (disambiguation) =

Thomas Ainsworth (1795–1841) was an Englishman and the founding father of Nijverdal.

Thomas or Tom Ainsworth may also refer to:

== People ==
- Sir Thomas Ainsworth, 2nd Baronet of the Ainsworth baronets (1886–1971)
- Sir Thomas Ainsworth, 4th Baronet of the Ainsworth baronets (1926–1999)

== Fictional characters ==
- Thomas Ainsworth, character in Gentleman Jack (TV series)
- Tom Ainsworth, character in Love is Strange played by Ron Silver
- Tom Ainsworth, character in The Raiders (1952 film)
