= John Campbell (1798–1830) =

Scottish politician (1798–1830)

John Campbell (28 May 1798 – 3 July 1830) was a Scottish advocate and politician.

He was the eldest surviving son of judge Sir Archibald Campbell, 2nd Baronet (Lord Succoth) of Succoth, Dunbarton, educated at Harrow School and became an advocate in 1821. He predeceased his father, who died in 1846.

He was the Member of Parliament (MP) for Dunbartonshire from 1826 to 1830.

He married Anna Jane Sitwell, daughter of Francis Sitwell. His eldest son Archibald Campbell (1825–66) succeeded John's father as 3rd Baronet and was Conservative MP for Argyllshire, 1851–57. He was in turn succeeded by his younger brother George Campbell, 4th Baronet (1829–74).

Parliament of the United Kingdom
Preceded by John Buchanan	Member of Parliament for Dunbartonshire; 1826–1830	Succeeded by Lord Montagu Graham
