= Sir Archibald Campbell, 2nd Baronet =

Scottish advocate and judge (1769–1846)

Sir Archibald Campbell of Succoth, Lord Succoth, 2nd Baronet FRSE (1 August 1769 – 23 July 1846) was a Scottish advocate and judge. His country house was Garscube House, succeeding to the estate in 1823, upon his father's death. He rebuilt the house at Garscube in 1827, to a design by William Burn. He added Cumlodden, Blairwhoisk, Sommerson and Gartowhern to the family estate.

The son of Sir Ilay Campbell and Susan Mary Murray, he was admitted to the Faculty of Advocates in 1791, and in 1809 became a Senator of the College of Justice under the judicial title Lord Succoth.

A member of the Highland Society (1792), he was elected a Fellow of the Royal Society of Edinburgh on 4 June 1821, upon the proposal of Alexander Maconochie.

== Family ==
He married Elizabeth, a daughter of John Balfour and Mary Gordon of Balbirnie, on 8 August 1794. Their second daughter, Elizabeth Anne Campbell, married David Leslie-Melville, 8th Earl of Leven, 7th Earl of Melville.

His son, John Campbell, was Member of Parliament for Dunbartonshire. His grandson, Archibald Campbell, 3rd Baronet, was Member of Parliament for Argyllshire.

== See also ==
- Campbell baronets
- Succoth, Argyll and Bute

Baronetage of the United Kingdom
Preceded by Ilay Campbell	Baronet (of Succoth); 1823–1846	Succeeded by Archibald Campbell
