= Donald Nicol (MP) =

Former Scottish politician

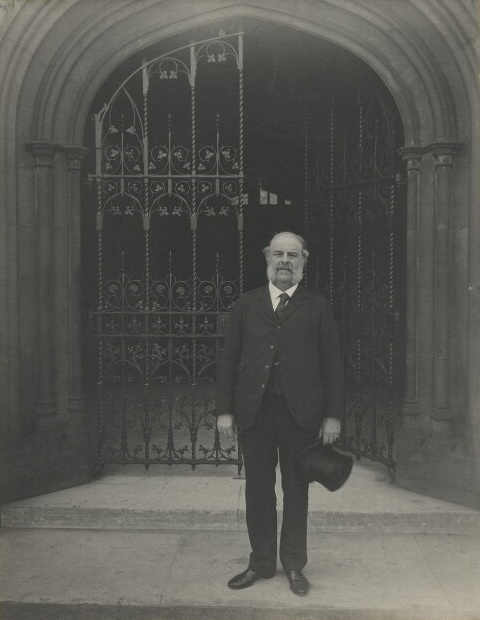
- Nicol in 1897.

Member of Parliament for Argyllshire
- In office 13 July 1895 – 27 July 1903
- Preceded by: Donald Horne Macfarlane
- Succeeded by: Sir John Ainsworth

Personal details
- Born: Donald Ninian Nicol; 3 October 1843 Liverpool, Lancashire
- Died: 27 July 1903 (aged 59) Marylebone, London
- Party: Unionist

Donald Ninian Nicol JP DL (3 October 1843 – 27 July 1903) was a British barrister and politician, who served as the Unionist Party MP for Argyllshire 1895 to 1903.

== Early life and education ==
Nicol was born in Liverpool, Lancashire, in October 1843 to a Scottish father & English mother. He was educated in Scotland, first at Merchiston Castle School, Edinburgh and at the University of Glasgow. In 1863 he entered Queen's College, Oxford, achieving a BA in 1867 and an MA in 1872. He was called to the bar at the Middle Temple in 1870 and worked on the Northern Circuit.

== Political career ==
Nicol stood for election as the Conservative candidate for Argyllshire in the 1895 general election, where he defeated the incumbent Liberal MP Donald Horne Macfarlane. Nicol was re-elected at the 1900 general election with a 54% majority.

== Personal life & death ==
Nicol was married to Anne Millicent Bates (1849-1946), daughter of Sir Edward Bates, in 1874. They had 4 children.

Nicol suffered from heart disease in later life, and he died in July 1903 after suffering a severe illness. He was succeeded as MP in a by-election by Liberal candidate Sir John Ainsworth who Nicol had previously defeated in 1900.

== Electoral history ==
=== 1895 general election ===
General election 1895: Argyllshire
Party	Candidate	Votes	%	±%
Conservative	Donald Nicol	3,970	50.9	+1.5
Liberal	Donald Horne Macfarlane	3,835	49.1	−1.5
Majority		135	1.8	N/A
Turnout		7,805	74.5	+1.1
Registered electors		10,471		
Conservative gain from Liberal		Swing	+1.5	

=== 1900 general election ===
General election 1900: Argyllshire
Party	Candidate	Votes	%	±%
Conservative	Donald Nicol	3,834	54.2	+3.3
Liberal	John Ainsworth	3,234	45.8	−3.3
Majority		600	8.4	+6.6
Turnout		7,068	67.9	−6.6
Registered electors		10,405		
Conservative hold		Swing	+3.3	
