= F. A. Macquisten =

British politician

Frederick Alexander Macquisten KC (23 July 1870 in Inverkip, Scotland – 29 February 1940 in Walton-on-Thames, England) was a British lawyer and politician. He was the son of Reverend Dr. Alexander Macquisten, the minister of Inverkip Parish Church.

== Background ==
Educated by his father, from whom he acquired an intimate knowledge of the Bible, he attended University of Glasgow and went on to practise as a solicitor. At the same time, he was elected a member of Glasgow Corporation. In 1909, he qualified as a member of the Faculty of Advocates in Scotland and ten years later was called to the Bar by Gray's Inn. He was made a King's Counsel (KC) in Scotland in 1919, and took silk at the English Bar in 1932.

== Politics ==
Macquisten unsuccessfully contested the Leith Burghs parliamentary constituency in 1910, and then Glasgow St. Rollox in 1912 as a Unionist. In 1918, he was elected as the Conservative party Member of Parliament (MP) for Glasgow Springburn.

In 1921 he put forward a proposal to criminalize lesbianism which was rejected by the House of Lords; during the debate, Lord Birkenhead, the then Lord High Chancellor of Great Britain argued that 999 women out of a thousand had "never even heard a whisper of these practices."

Macquisten held onto the Glasgow Springburn constituency until he was defeated in the general election of 1922. He then fought and won Argyllshire in 1924, holding it for the Scottish Conservative & Unionist Party until his death in 1940.

In the House of Commons he was known for his wit. The humour which he often brought to his speeches often belied their serious content. He was though serious in his effort to abolish the compulsory Political Levy which Trade Union members paid before the passing of the Trade Disputes and Trade Union Act 1927.

In 1925, he introduced a Private Member's Bill which was intended, in his own words, to "restore the individual freedom of the working man." The second reading of the Bill elicited a speech on "Peace in Industry" from the Prime Minister, Stanley Baldwin, a speech which made a great impression at the time. The Baldwin Government accepted the principle of the Bill, but moved an amendment on the basis that legislation on such an important question ought not to emanate from a private member, but from the Government itself. The Bill was eventually introduced following the general strike in 1926.

He was the champion of private buses and a one-man shopkeeper. He also sang the praises of herring and porridge, and his unerring praise of the properties of Scotch whisky gave rise to a series of much celebrated verbal duels with the teetotal Lady Astor. When rationing was introduced, he was the first to suggest mass-production of macon, the mutton substitute for bacon, which originated from an old Scottish recipe. "If the Parliamentary Secretary to the Minister of Food will consult with any farmer's wife in Perthshire, she will show him how to cure it," he informed the House of Commons.

== Death ==
Macquisten died at his home at Walton-on-Thames, Surrey, England, on 29 February 1940 aged 69.

Parliament of the United Kingdom
New constituency	Member of Parliament for Glasgow Springburn; 1918–1922	Succeeded by George Hardie
Preceded by Sir William Sutherland	Member of Parliament for Argyllshire; 1924–1940	Succeeded by Duncan McCallum
