= John MacKay, Baron MacKay of Ardbrecknish =

Scottish Conservative and Unionist Party politician

The Right Honourable The Lord Mackay of Ardbrecknish PC DL

Minister of State for Social Security with special responsibility for War Pensions
- In office 5 July 1995 – 4 May 1997
- Prime Minister: John Major

Parliamentary Under-Secretary of State for Transport
- In office 20 July 1994 – 5 July 1995
- Prime Minister: John Major

Lord-in-waiting
- In office 27 May 1993 – 20 July 1994
- Prime Minister: John Major
- Preceded by: The Viscount Astor
- Succeeded by: The Lord Annaly

Parliamentary Under-Secretary of State for Scotland
- In office 6 April 1982 – 14 June 1987
- Prime Minister: Margaret Thatcher
- Preceded by: Malcolm Rifkind
- Succeeded by: James Douglas-Hamilton

Member of Parliament for Argyll and Bute
- In office 9 June 1983 – 18 May 1987
- Preceded by: New constituency
- Succeeded by: Ray Michie

Member of Parliament for Argyll
- In office 3 May 1979 – 13 May 1983
- Preceded by: Iain MacCormick
- Succeeded by: Constituency abolished

Member of the House of Lords
- Lord Temporal
- Life peerage 26 June 1991 – 21 February 2001

Personal details
- Born: 15 November 1938
- Died: 21 February 2001 (aged 62) Wandsworth
- Party: Conservative
- Children: Colin MacKay, Fiona Sales, David MacKay
- Occupation: Politician

John Jackson Mackay, Baron Mackay of Ardbrecknish PC DL (15 November 1938 – 21 February 2001) was a Scottish Conservative and Unionist Party politician.

== Early life ==
Mackay was born in 1938, the son of Jackson and Jean Mackay, and was educated at Campbeltown Grammar School, the University of Glasgow (BSc) and Jordanhill College of Education, where he graduated with a Diploma in Education. Mackay started his career as a mathematics teacher, becoming Head of Mathematics at Oban High School.

== Political career ==
He was a Tory candidate for the Western Isles in the February 1974 election having, in the climate of the era, accepted he could realise his original Liberal Parliamentary ambitions only by joining the Conservatives. He contested Argyll in October 1974 and was Member of Parliament for the constituency from 1979 to 1983, and after boundary changes, for Argyll and Bute from 1983 to 1987, when he lost the seat to the Liberal candidate Ray Michie – the daughter of Lord Bannerman, a local Liberal.

Mackay was Parliamentary Under-Secretary of State for Scotland from 1982 to 1987 with responsibility for Health and Social Work and was Commons Scottish spokesman on Agriculture (which was the responsibility of the Earl of Mansfield sitting in the Lords). Against the advice of officials he supported a Private Member's Bill on solvent abuse, a scourge of the time, which became law in 1983. In Health he threw himself into the 1982 NHS strikes and a modernisation of mental health legislation.

== House of Lords ==
Following his defeat, he was given a life peerage as Baron Mackay of Ardbrecknish, of Tayvallich in the District of Argyll and Bute. He rejoined the government as a Lord in Waiting in 1993. In January 1994, he joined the Department of Transport as a Parliamentary Under-Secretary of State, being promoted later that year to become Minister of State at the Department of Social Security, a post he held until 1997. During this time he was held in high regard by both the civil servants who worked with him and by the ex-Service community with whom he had regular contact in his role as War Pensions Minister. In addition, he was sworn of the Privy Council in the 1996 Birthday Honours and was appointed to be a deputy lieutenant of the city of Glasgow on 7 January 1997. In opposition, he served as deputy leader of the Conservative peers.

== Death ==
He died in 2001 in Wandsworth at the age of 62.

== Sources ==
- Times Guide to the House of Commons 1983 (London: Times Books, 1984).
- Times Guide to the House of Commons 1987 (London: Times Books, 1988).
- Leigh Rayment's Peerage Pages
- Leigh Rayment's Historical List of MPs
- Roth, Andrew "Obituary: Lord Mackay of Ardbrecknish", The Guardian. Retrieved 24 May 2013.

Parliament of the United Kingdom
Preceded by Iain MacCormick	Member of Parliament for Argyll; 1979–1983	Constituency abolished
New constituency	Member of Parliament for Argyll and Bute; 1983–1987	Succeeded by Ray Michie
Political offices
Unknown	Minister of State for Education and Employment; 1995–1997	Unknown
Preceded by The Viscount Astor	Lord-in-waiting; 1994–1995	Succeeded by The Lord Annaly
Unknown	Parliamentary Under-Secretary of State for Department for Transport; 1993–1994	Unknown
Preceded by John Allan Stewart	Parliamentary Under-Secretary of State for Scotland; 1982–1987	Succeeded by James Douglas-Hamilton
