= Michael Noble, Baron Glenkinglas =

Scottish Conservative and Unionist politician

The Right Honourable The Lord Glenkinglas PC
- Photograph of Noble by Elliott & Fry, taken 26 September 1962.

President of the Board of Trade
- In office 20 June 1970 – 15 October 1970
- Prime Minister: Edward Heath
- Preceded by: Roy Mason
- Succeeded by: John Davies

Secretary of State for Scotland
- In office 13 July 1962 – 16 October 1964
- Prime Minister: Harold Macmillan; Alec Douglas-Home
- Preceded by: John Maclay
- Succeeded by: William Ross

Lord Commissioner of the Treasury
- In office 29 November 1961 – 13 July 1962
- Prime Minister: Harold Macmillan
- Preceded by: Robin Chichester-Clark
- Succeeded by: Gordon Campbell

Member of Parliament for Argyll
- In office 12 June 1958 – 8 February 1974
- Preceded by: Duncan McCallum
- Succeeded by: Iain MacCormick

Personal details
- Born: 13 March 1913 Las Palmas, Canary Islands, Spain
- Died: 15 May 1984 (aged 71) Cairndow, Argyll and Bute, Scotland
- Party: Conservative
- Spouse: Anne Pearson (1923-2007)
- Children: 4
- Education: Magdalen College, Oxford
- Profession: Landowner, farmer

Michael Antony Cristobal Noble, Baron Glenkinglas, PC (13 March 1913 – 15 May 1984) was a Scottish Conservative and Unionist politician.

Noble was the youngest son of Sir John Noble, 1st Baronet, and the grandson of Sir Andrew Noble, 1st Baronet, and was educated at Eton College and Magdalen College, Oxford. A farmer, he was president of the Black Face Sheep Breeders' Association and the Highland Cattle Society. He was an Argyll County Councillor and a director of Associated Fisheries.

From a by-election in June 1958 until his retirement in 1974 he was Member of Parliament for Argyll.

Noble was a Scottish whip from 1960 and Lord Commissioner of the Treasury from 1961. He was Secretary of State for Scotland from 1962 to 1964 in the governments of Harold Macmillan and Alec Douglas-Home, taking over from John Maclay after the Night of the Long Knives. He returned to government as President of the Board of Trade in 1970 and as Minister for Trade from 1970 to 1972 under Edward Heath.

As Scottish Secretary, he presided over the last execution in Scotland when Henry John Burnett was hanged at Craiginches Prison in Aberdeen on the morning of 15 August 1963 by the hangman Harry Allen for the murder of merchant seaman Thomas Guyan.

On 3 May 1974 Noble was elevated with a life peerage as Baron Glenkinglas, of Cairndow in the County of Argyll.

Although he was a good 25 years younger than the architectural historian Harry Stuart Goodhart-Rendel, the two had a very friendly feud. Noble is said to have joked that they were "best of enemies."

He died in May 1984, aged 71.

== Bibliography ==
- Torrance, David, The Scottish Secretaries (Birlinn 2006)
- Kidd, Charles, Williamson, David (editors). Debrett's Peerage and Baronetage (1990 edition). New York: St Martin's Press, 1990,,

Parliament of the United Kingdom
Preceded by Sir Duncan McCallum	Member of Parliament for Argyll; 1958–February 1974	Succeeded by Iain MacCormick
Political offices
Preceded by John Maclay	Secretary of State for Scotland; 1962–1964	Succeeded by William Ross
Preceded by Roy Mason	President of the Board of Trade; Jun–Oct 1970	Succeeded by John Davies (Secretary of State for Trade and Industry)
