= Ray Michie =

Scottish politician

The Right Honourable The Baroness Michie of Gallanach

Member of Parliament for Argyll and Bute
- In office 11 June 1987 – 14 May 2001
- Preceded by: John Mackay
- Succeeded by: Alan Reid

Member of the House of Lords
- Lord Temporal
- Life peerage 14 July 2001 – 6 May 2008

Personal details
- Born: Janet Ray Bannerman; 4 February 1934 Balmaha, Stirlingshire, Scotland, UK
- Died: 6 May 2008 (aged 74) Oban, Scotland
- Party: Liberal Democrat
- Other political affiliations: Liberal
- Spouse: Iain Michie
- Education: Edinburgh College of Speech Therapy

Janet Ray Michie, Baroness Michie of Gallanach (née Bannerman; 4 February 1934 – 6 May 2008) was a Scottish speech therapist and Liberal Democrat politician. She served as the Member of Parliament for Argyll and Bute for fourteen years, from 1987-2001, and then became a life peer in the House of Lords. She was the first peer to pledge the oath of allegiance in the House of Lords in Gaelic.

== Early life ==
Janet Ray Bannerman was born in the Old Manse, Balmaha, on the eastern shore of Loch Lomond in Stirlingshire, the second of four children of Jenny Murray (Ray) (née Mundell) and John Bannerman (later Lord Bannerman of Kildonan).

Her father was a farm manager to the Duke of Montrose, a former Scotland rugby player and Liberal politician. In her youth, she spoke at political meetings while waiting for her father to arrive. He contested Argyll at the 1945 general election, and Inverness at the 1950 general election. He surprised many by narrowly losing the 1954 Inverness by-election, coming close again at the general elections in 1951 and 1955. He narrowly lost the 1961 Paisley by-election, and contested Paisley again at the 1964 general election, before becoming a life peer in December 1967.

Michie was educated at Aberdeen High School for Girls, Lansdowne House School (Edinburgh), and the Edinburgh College of Speech Therapy. She married Iain Michie in 1957, and she followed his work with the Royal Army Medical Corps for 16 years in the UK and overseas. They had three daughters. She continued as a speech therapist after they settled in Oban, working at the county hospital and becoming Area Speech Therapist for the Argyll and Clyde Health Board in 1977.

== Political career ==
Following in the footsteps of her father, she entered politics and became Chairman of Argyll Liberal Association from 1973–76, and then vice-Chairman of the Scottish Liberal Party from 1977-79. She was the Liberal Party candidate for Argyll and Bute on three occasions, losing in 1979 and 1983, but ultimately defeating Conservative minister John Mackay to secure election as Member of Parliament at the 1987 general election, becoming the sole female Liberal MP.

She took the oath of allegiance in the House of Commons in Gaelic, and joined the Liberal Democrats upon the party's formation in 1988. She increased her majority at the next two general elections, gaining the confidence of the voters in her scattered constituency of peninsulas and islands.

She was a Liberal Democrat spokesman on Transport and Rural Development from 1987–88, on Women's Issues from 1988–94, and on Scotland from 1988-97. She was an advocate of home rule for Scotland and the promotion of and development of the Scottish Gaelic language. She was also chair of the Scottish Liberal Democrats from 1992-93. She was appointed a member of the panel of chairmen by Speaker Betty Boothroyd in her last term in the Commons; from 1997-2001. She supported the campaigns to end submarine operations of the Royal Navy and United States Navy in the Firth of Clyde, to hold another inquiry into the Chinook crash on the Mull of Kintyre in 1994 in her constituency, and the successful bid for the residents of Gigha to buy their own island.

In 1992, Michie became a member of the House of Commons Select Committee on Scottish Affairs. Later, she also became a joint Vice-Chairperson of the Parliamentary Group on the Whisky Industry. She stood down from Parliament at the 2001 general election, being replaced by Alan Reid. She was made a life peer as Baroness Michie of Gallanach, of Oban in Argyll and Bute on 14 July 2001. She was the first peer to pledge the oath of allegiance in Gaelic when being introduced to the Lords.

At different points in her career, she was Vice-President of the Royal College of Speech and Language Therapists, Honorary Associate of the National Council of Women of Great Britain, and Honorary President of the Clyde Fishermen's Association, and also held honorary positions in the An Comunn Gàidhealach, the Scottish National Farmers' Union and the Scottish Crofting Foundation, and was a participant in the early days of the Scottish Constitutional Convention. She chaired the West Highland Health Services Solutions Group.

In August 2007, she was appointed to the Scottish Broadcasting Commission established by the Scottish Government. Before the Commission was able to report, Michie died at her home in Oban after receiving treatment for cancer. She died two days after her Liberal Democrat colleague in the House of Lords, Richard Holme. She was survived by two daughters, having been predeceased by her husband and a third daughter.

Parliament of the United Kingdom
Preceded by John Mackay	Member of Parliament for Argyll and Bute; 1987–2001	Succeeded by Alan Reid
