= Sir John Ainsworth, 1st Baronet =

British politician (1844–1923)

Sir John Stirling Ainsworth 1st Baronet
- John Ainsworth
- Born: 30 January 1844; Cleator Moor, Cumberland, England
- Died: 24 May 1923 (aged 79)
- Education: University College School, London
- Alma mater: University College London
- Occupations: Industrialist banker politician
- Spouse: Margaret Catherine Macredie (m. 1879; died 1918)
- Children: 3
- Parents: Thomas Ainsworth (father); Mary Laurie Stirling (mother)
- Relatives: David Ainsworth (brother)

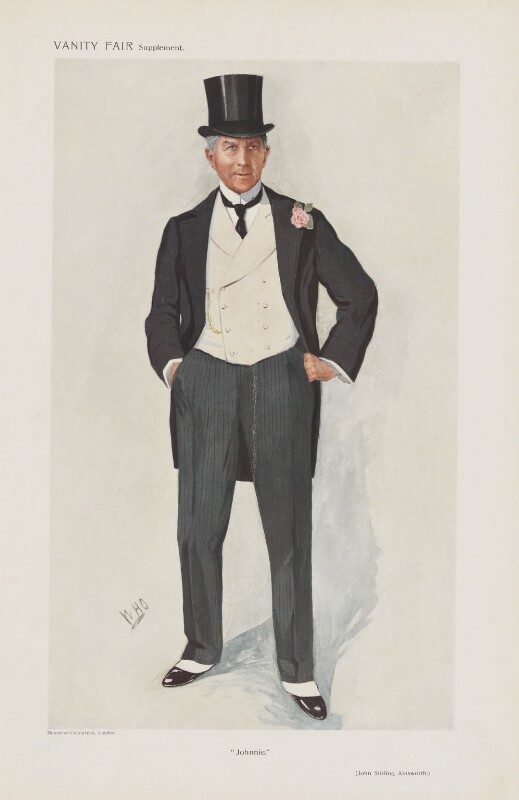
Sir John Ainsworth caricatured by "WHO" in Vanity Fair, 1910

Sir John Stirling Ainsworth (30 January 1844 – 24 May 1923) was an English industrialist, banker and Liberal Party politician.

== Family and education ==
Ainsworth was the son of Thomas Ainsworth of Cleator Moor, Cumberland. His mother was Mary Laurie, daughter of John Stirling, a Doctor of Divinity from Craigie in East Ayrshire. He was educated at University College School, London and at University College London where he obtained MA and LL.B degrees. In 1879 he married Margaret Catherine daughter of Robert Reid Macredie. They had one son and two daughters. His wife died in 1918. His brother, David Ainsworth (1842–1906) was Liberal Member of Parliament for West Cumberland from 1880 to 1885 and for Egremont from 1892 to 1895.

== Career ==
Ainsworth had interests in the iron mines and related industries in Cumberland. He was Chairman of the Cleator and Workington Junction Railway. He was also involved in banking, being a director of the Whitehaven Joint Stock Bank which later merged with Parr's Bank, of which Ainsworth then became director of the Cumberland and Westmoreland local board.

== Politics ==
Ainsworth contested the Barrow-in-Furness constituency at the 1886 general election. He faced the sitting Member of Parliament, William Sproston Caine who had been elected earlier that year in a by-election as a Liberal but had switched to the Liberal Unionist Party. Ainsworth did not fight the general elections of 1892 or 1895 but in 1900 he was chosen to contest Argyllshire. He did not win but got the chance to fight the seat again in 1903 at a by-election when the sitting member, Donald Ninian Nicol, died.

At the by-election, which was held on 26 August 1903, Ainsworth won in a straight fight against a Unionist candidate, Mr. C Stewart, by a majority of 1,586 votes. Whilst an MP he voted in favour of the 1908 Women's Enfranchisement Bill. He held the seat until 1918 when he stood down from Parliament.

== Other public service ==
Ainsworth was High Sheriff of Cumberland in 1891 and was later deputy lieutenant of Cumberland and of Argyllshire. He commanded the 3rd Volunteer Battalion, the Border Regiment from 1898 to November 1902, and received the honorary rank of colonel as he retired. He also served as a justice of the peace in Cumberland. He was created a baronet in 1917. In 1910 he was a member of the royal commission on Mines.

== Death ==
Ainsworth died on 24 May 1923, aged 79 years.

== See also ==
- Ainsworth baronets
- List of baronetcies in the baronetage of the United Kingdom
- List of Old Gowers

Parliament of the United Kingdom
Preceded by Donald Nicol (MP)	Member of Parliament for Argyllshire; 1903 – 1918	Succeeded by William Sutherland
Baronetage of the United Kingdom
New creation	Baronet (of Ardanaiseig); 1917–1923	Succeeded by Thomas Ainsworth
