= Alexander Struthers Finlay =

Scottish Liberal Party politician

Alexander Struthers Finlay (20 July 1807 – 9 June 1886) was a Scottish Liberal Party politician who served as the member of parliament (MP) for Argyllshire 1857–68.

He was a deputy lieutenant for Argyllshire and Buteshire and a magistrate. He was the son of Kirkman Finlay, MP for Glasgow.

His son, Alexander Kirkman Finlay, married Nora Robinson, the daughter of Sir Hercules Robinson, then Governor of New South Wales, in one of the most celebrated weddings of colonial Australia.

Parliament of the United Kingdom
Preceded by Archibald Islay Campbell	Member of Parliament for Argyllshire; 1851 – 1868	Succeeded by Marquess of Lorne
