= Robert Allwood =

English-born cleric & academic (1803-1891)

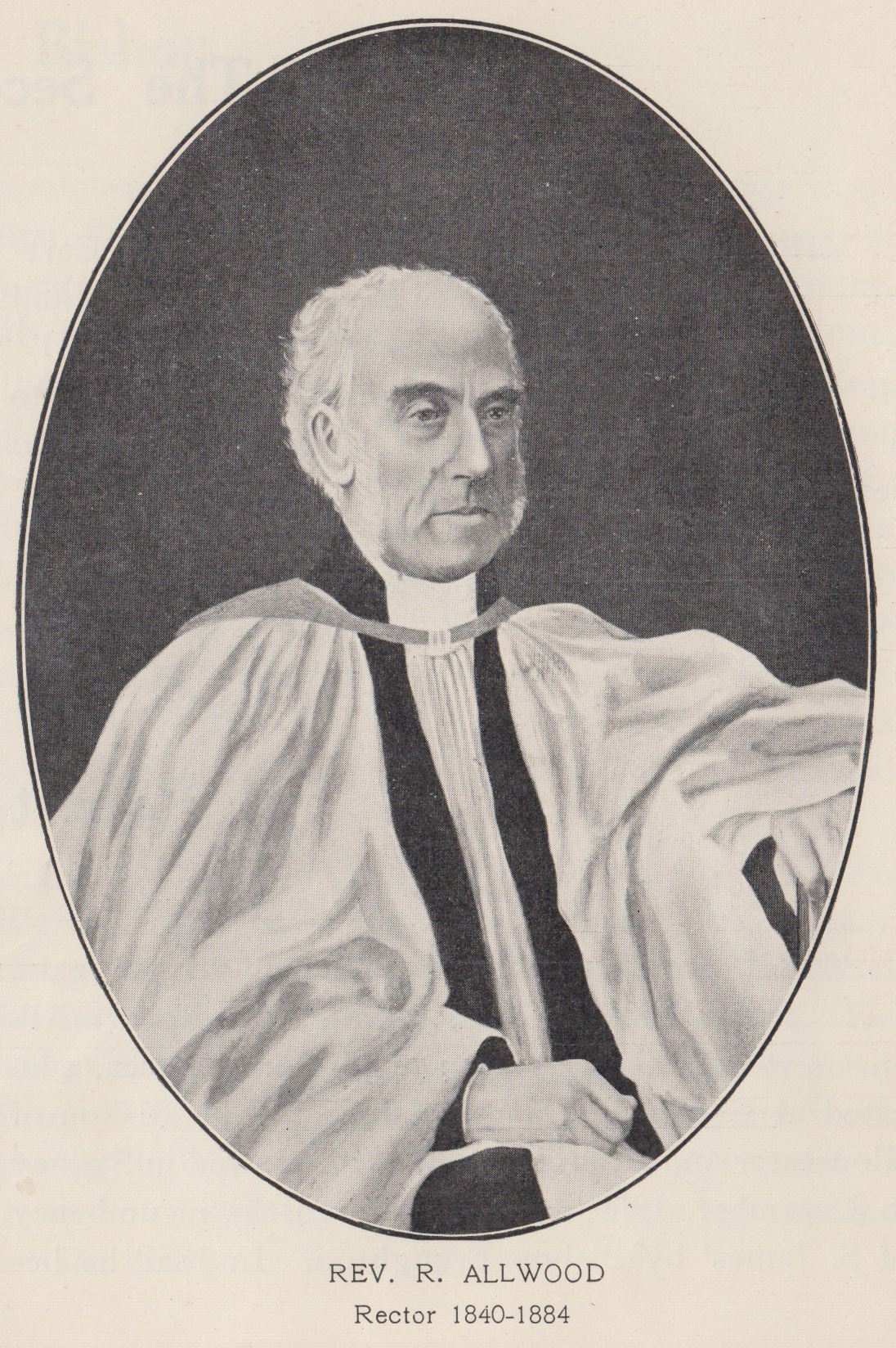
The Reverend Robert Allwood, Rector of St James' Church, Sydney (1840–1884)

Robert Allwood (1803–1891) was an English-born cleric, and academic in colonial Sydney, who served as rector of St James' Church, Sydney for 44 years.

== Early life ==
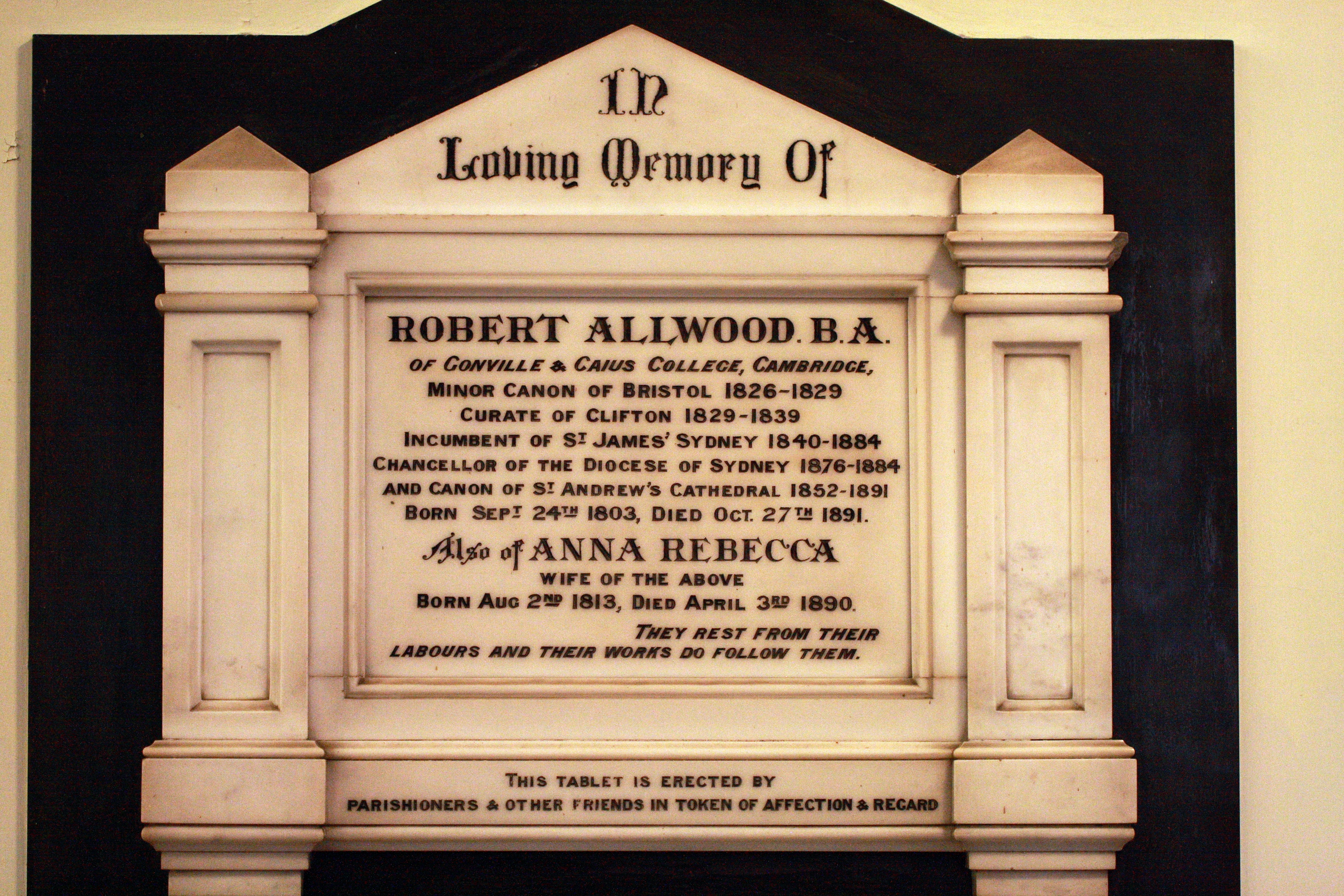
A memorial to Allwood on the wall of St James' Church, Sydney

Allwood was born in 1803 and was the son of Chief Justice Allwood, of Jamaica. He was educated at Gonville and Caius College, Cambridge, where he graduated BA in 1825. He took holy orders and was ordained deacon in 1826 by the Bishop of Bath and Wells and priest in 1827 by the Bishop of Gloucester and Bristol. He was a minor canon of Bristol Cathedral from 1826 to 1839 and curate of Clifton from 1829 to 1839.

His father received significant compensation at the abolition of slavery, owning more than 500 slaves at the time.

In the 1830s he lodged compensation claims on behalf of his wife's family (the children of Joseph Bush of Martinique) for the slaves they lost upon the abolition of slavery. Allwood's claim realized £10,000 for 202 slaves from the British government, and was distributed among Bush's legatees.

His sister Anne also emigrated to Australia with her husband Francis Henslowe. Henslowe was private secretary to Sir John Franklin and first clerk of the colony's House of Assembly, in Tasmania.

== New South Wales ==
Allwood emigrated to New South Wales, arriving in Sydney on 8 December 1839 on the Kinnear. From 1840 to 1884 he was incumbent of St James' Church, Sydney, where he officiated at many important events in the colony, including at the wedding of Nora Robinson and Alexander Kirkman Finlay in 1878. He was appointed canon of St Andrew's Cathedral in 1852; was chancellor of the Sydney diocese from 1876 to 1884; and Vice-Chancellor of the University of Sydney in 1869. He died on 27 October 1891.

== Works ==
In 1843, he published a brochure entitled "The Papal Claim of Jurisdiction" (in Australia).
