= Macon (food) =

Bacon substitute made from mutton

Macon is a cured and smoked form of mutton. Macon is prepared in a similar manner to bacon, with the meat being either dry cured with large quantities of salt or wet cured with brine and then smoked. The name macon is a portmanteau word of mutton and bacon. In South Africa the term is also used for other bacon substitutes, including ones made from beef.

Generally macon has a light black and yellow color, with the outer edges being a darker pink. Macon looks and feels similar to bacon. It would more commonly be found in a thin sliced form used in sandwiches, or as a smaller cut slice topping on a pizza.

It is also used as a bacon substitute for religious groups such as Jews and Muslims, whose faith does not allow the consumption of pork.

== Use in World War II ==
Local macon production has been practiced for centuries in Scotland. It was mass-produced in the United Kingdom during World War II when rationing was instituted. Scottish lawyer and politician Frederick Alexander Macquisten, was the first to suggest mass production of macon. "If the Parliamentary Secretary to the Minister of Food will consult with any farmer's wife in Perthshire, she will show him how to cure it," he informed the House of Commons. This led to its popular name Macon's bacon.

== See also ==
- List of lamb dishes
