= Alexander Campbell Cameron =

British politician

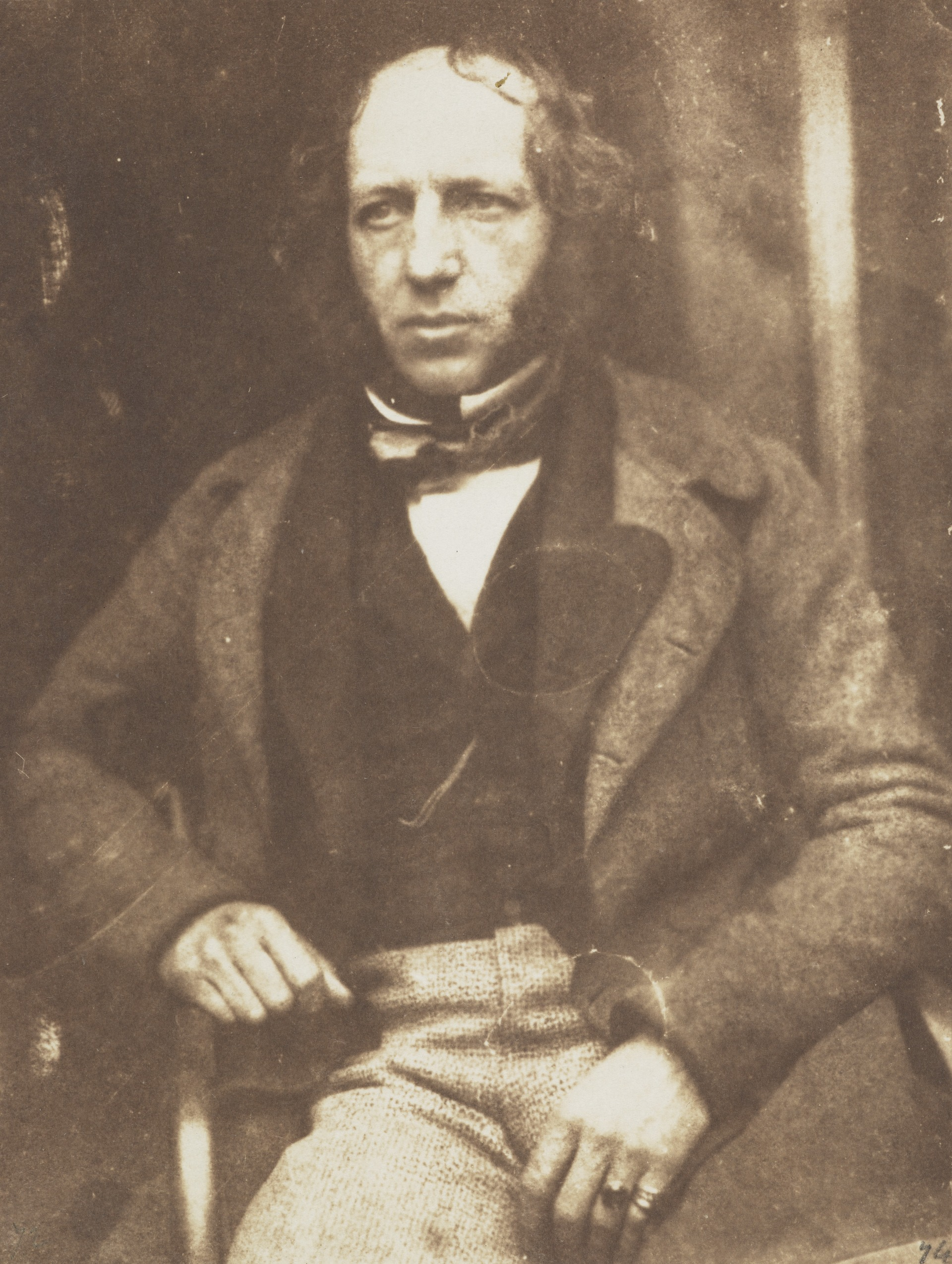
- Alexander Campbell of Monzie by Hill & Adamson

Member of Parliament for Argyllshire
- In office 9 July 1841 – 8 September 1843
- Preceded by: Walter Frederick Campbell
- Succeeded by: Duncan McNeill

Personal details
- Born: Alexander Campbell; 30 December 1812
- Died: 5 January 1869 (aged 56)
- Party: Conservative

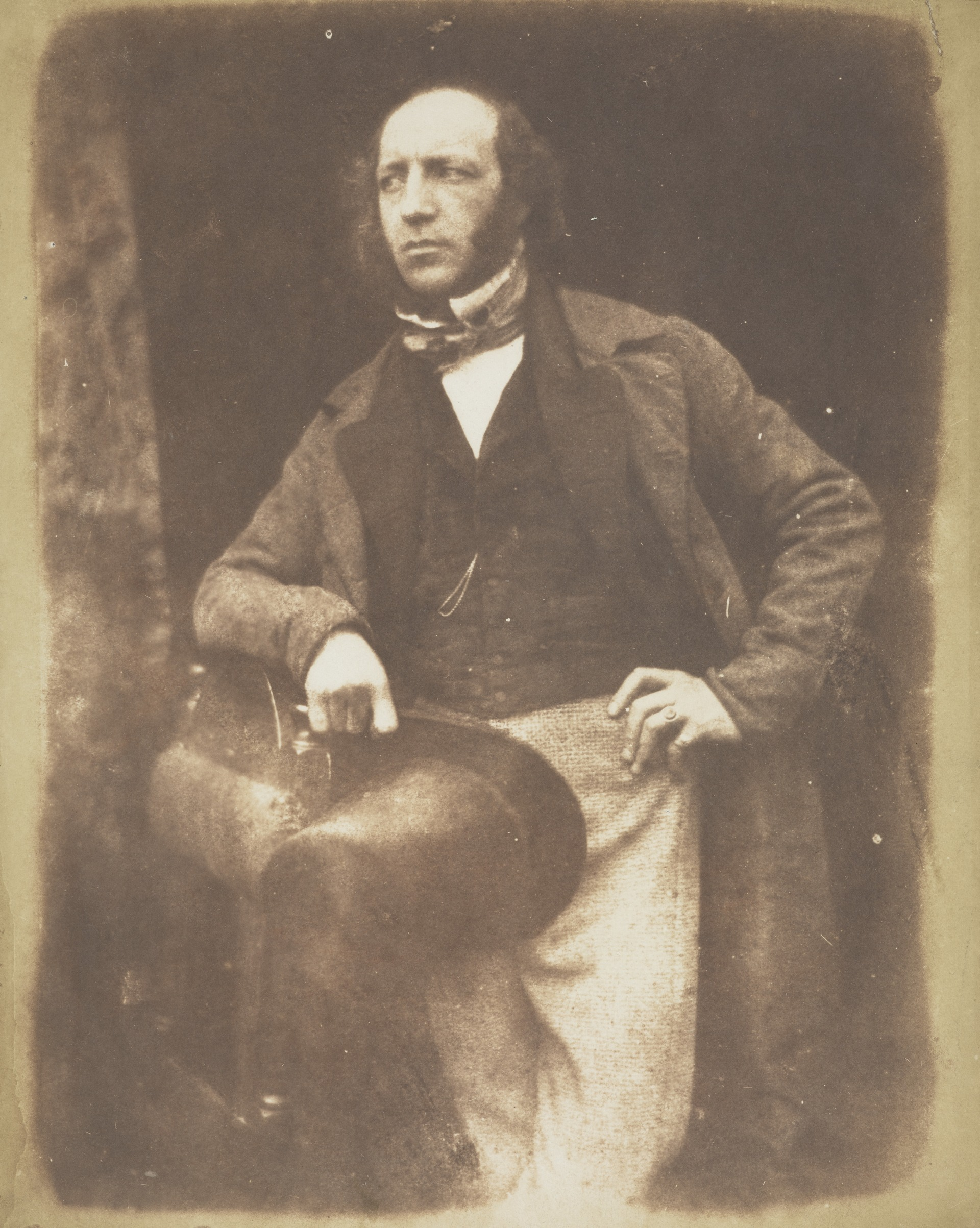
Alexander Campbell of Monzie, by Hill & Adamson

Alexander Campbell Cameron (30 December 1812 – 5 January 1869), known as Alexander Campbell until 1844, was a British Conservative politician.

He was elected Conservative MP for Argyllshire at the 1841 general election but resigned from the seat two years later by accepting the office of Steward of the Chiltern Hundreds. He unsuccessfully sought election again at Edinburgh in 1852, and at Inverness Burghs in 1857 and 1859.

== Ancestry ==
The Monzie branch of the Clan Campbell springs from Sir Duncan of Glenorchy, also known as "Black Duncan of Lochow", the patriarch of the house of Breadalbane. Archibald, a younger son of this old knight, inherited from his father various estates in several of the Highland counties, and transmitted them to his lineal descendants, the Campbells of Monzie. The original designation was "of Fonab," a property in Perthshire, near Killiecrankie, where Viscount Dundee was slain; and the tradition is, that Claverhouse fell by a shot fired by Fonab himself, or by one of his dependants who followed his chief to the field. The Fonab of 1702 commanded the British troops sent to protect the interests of the colonists of Darien against the attacks of the Spaniards, and obtained a signal and decisive victory over a vastly more numerous force of the enemy at Toubocante. For this action a gold medal, bearing on one side a plan of the battle, was voted to him by the Directors of the Indian and African Company of Scotland; while the British Crown rewarded him with a grant of a special coat of arms, with supporters, bearing the motto "Quid non pro patria"; and as this latter honour was bestowed on him as "Campbell of Monzie".

== Early life and education ==
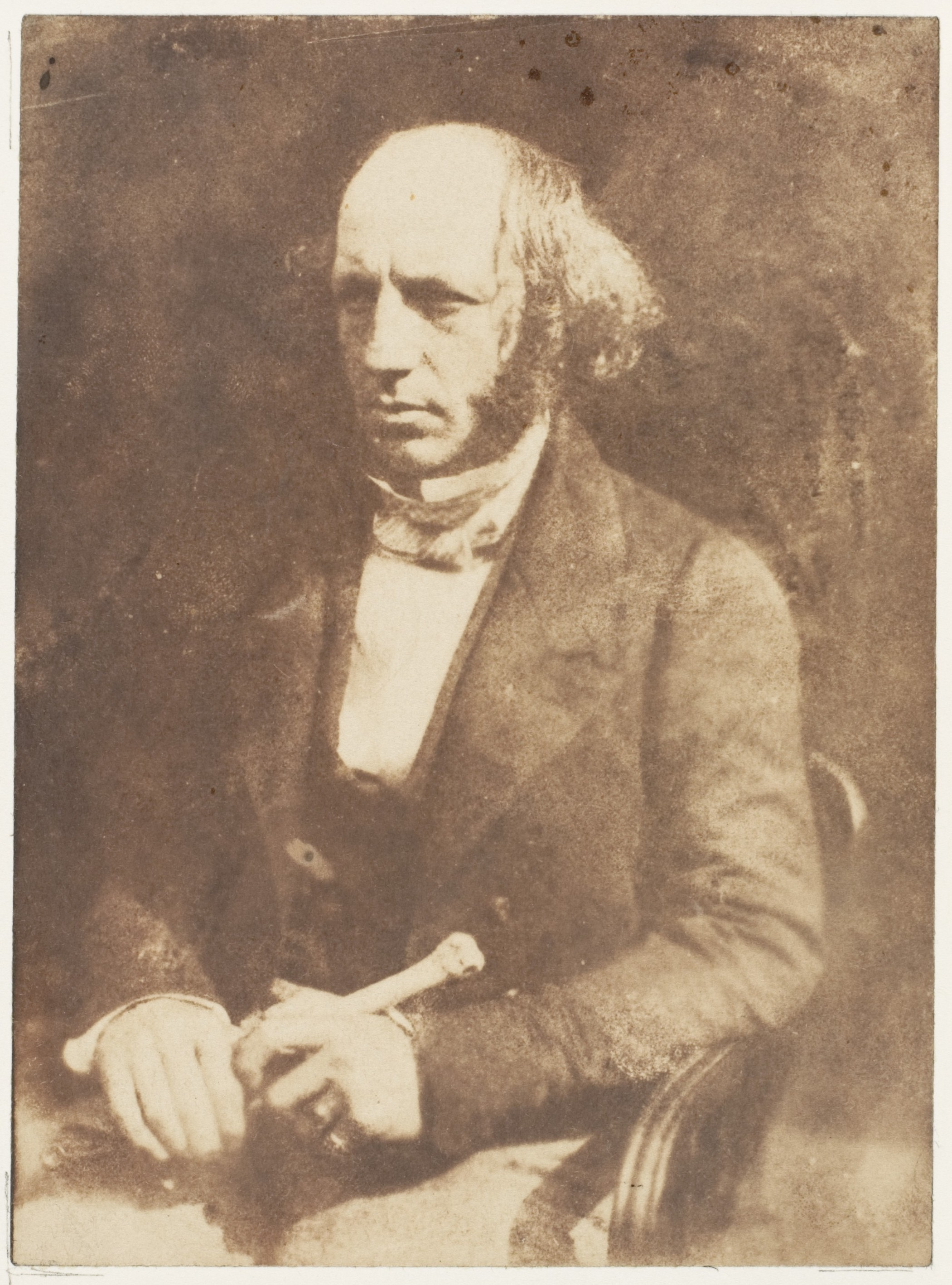
Campbell of Monzie

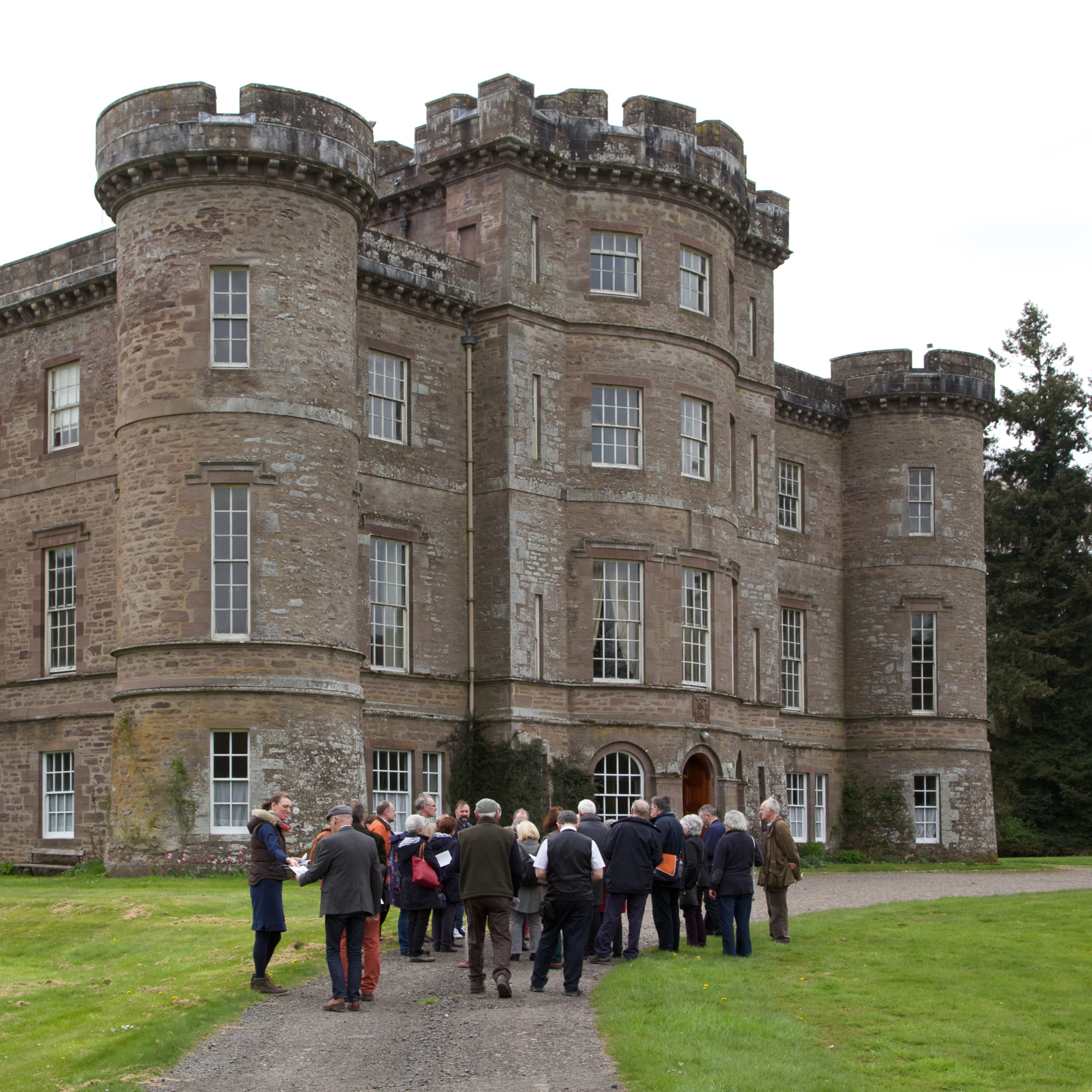
Monzie Castle seen from the east

Alexander Campbell was born on 30 December 1811. He was the eldest son of Lieutenant-General Alexander Campbell of Monzie, M.P., and his wife Christina Menzies. After his education, partly at home and partly at Sandhurst College, he entered the army in 1828 as ensign in the 32d Foot, of which regiment his father had been colonel. Serving some time in Canada with that regiment, he changed into the 15th Hussars under the Earl of Cardigan; but in 1835 he left the army, and engaged himself in the management of his landed property at Monzie, his father having died in 1832.

== Early political career ==
At the time Campbell assumed the position of a country gentleman, the non-intrusion controversy was agitating all Scotland; and Campbell adopted the views of the evangelical party in the Church. About this time he was asked by the Conservative electors in Argyllshire to oppose the Liberal candidate; but though he was unsuccessful in the election of 1837, he so effectively advocated the Church's claims during his canvass, as to draw the attention and win the confidence of the non-intrusion leaders. Having been ordained an elder in 1838, he began still more prominently to plead the Church's cause; for instance, when in 1840 he proposed Home-Drummond on the hustings at Perth, he embodied in his speech a proposal for Parliamentary interference to obviate the deadlock between the ecclesiastical and civil courts, which Thomas Chalmers characterized as "presenting a most felicitous solution of the whole difficulty."

== Member of Parliament ==
In 1841 he was returned M.P. for the county of Argyll without a contest. He entered Parliament as a Liberal Conservative, and so attracted the notice of Sir Robert Peel as to be offered by him a subordinate place under Government; but Campbell felt it better to be free from party control, and declined the appointment. At this period, in addition to his strong ecclesiastical convictions, he held free trade principles, and was a supporter of vote by ballot, both of which he insisted would prove truly Conservative measures. His first speech in the House of Commons on Scottish Church matters was delivered in March 1842, in the debate on Andrew Leith Hay's motion as to the exercise of crown patronage in the case of Elgin, a speech which again drew forth the praise of Dr Chalmers, who, at the same time, urged him to push his proposed motion that the House should appoint a committee of its members to inquire into the Church's claims. This motion he did bring forward soon thereafter, and pled the expediency of such a step with great force of argument; but the motion was lost by 139 to 62.

These Parliamentary appearances so commended him to the Church Defence Committee in Scotland, that, after the Duke of Argyll's Bill was coldly received in the House of Lords, Mr Campbell was requested to introduce a similar bill into the House of Commons. Acceding heartily to this request, he, on 14 April 1842, brought in a "Bill to regulate the exercise of Church Patronage in Scotland." Though not granting the anti-patronage claims which the Church regarded as the best settlement, it is said that it would have saved both the rights of the people and the Church's spiritual independence, and thus have prevented the secession of next year. When the order of the day for its second reading was moved in the beginning of May, Sir James Graham, on the part of Government, requested Mr Campbell to postpone the second reading for six weeks, as Government intended to propose a course which would put an end to the collision between the Church and the civil courts. Mr Campbell consented to this, with the distinct proviso, that, should the Government measure prove unsatisfactory, he would that day six weeks proceed with the second reading of his own Bill; but Mr Fox Maule, intimating his hopelessness of any proper measure from Government, moved "That the Bill be now read a second time," and, after some debate, Mr Maule's amendment was lost by 131 to 48. Thus ended what was called "Monzie's Bill." Sir James Graham's pledge was never fulfilled, for Government did nothing. Most people now saw — and none more plainly than Mr Campbell— that a Disruption was imminent. In the prospect of this, a Convocation of ministers was held in Edinburgh, followed by active arrangements throughout many congregations in Scotland in preparation for the event. The rejection of Fox Maule's motion by the House of Commons in the spring of 1843 rendered the Disruption so certain, that Mr Campbell left London for a time, and at once set about the building of a wooden church for his residential parish of Monzie. This was quickly finished at his own expense, while he purchased a church which was for sale in Crieff, and presented it to the Free Church congregation there.

After delivering several earnest speeches in Scotland on the impending crisis, he resumed for a time his place in Parliament, and wrote what has been called "a solemn letter to Sir Robert Peel, imploring him even at the eleventh hour to avert the breaking up of the Church, by instantaneous and satisfactory legislative interposition." All in vain. The General Assembly met. Mr Campbell, as a representative elder, was present; and after Dr Welsh had read the Protest, bowed to the Lord High Commissioner, and stepped down from the chair, Dr Chalmers took Mr Campbell's arm, saying, "Come away now, Monzie," and the two walked together down to the Canonmills Hall, where the first Free Church General Assembly was constituted. Before the sessions of that Assembly were concluded, Mr Campbell returned to London, to make final arrangements for retiring from Parliament; but the Assembly, on 30 of May, passed a cordial vote of thanks to him for his services, which was communicated to him by a much-prized letter under Dr Chalmers' own hand.

On the very day of the Disruption, Mr Campbell wrote a circular to the Argyllshire constituency, intimating his resolution to resign his position as their representative, having felt constrained in conscience to differ widely from many of those who had originally elected him. Being thus, as it were, set free from other influences, he devoted himself to promote the interests of the Free Church, the object 'nearest and dearest to his heart."

== Work for the Free Church ==
Hence he was much occupied for several years in labours connected with the Sustentation Fund, the General Assembly, the formation of the Evangelical Alliance, the Christian education of the people, the endowment of Popery, the sanctity of the Sabbath in reference to railway traffic, the destitution in the Highlands, and many other undertakings. He also contributed liberally to many schemes, specially those of his own Church, giving £1000 to the building of the Free Church College in Edinburgh, £300 to the manse fund, £250 towards extinguishing debt on Free Church buildings, along with notable yearly subscriptions to the Sustentation Fund in the various districts where his property was situated. Some ladies of the West of Scotland presented him with a carpet, sewed by their own hands, and valued at £200. The presentation was made in Glasgow, on 14 April 1846, by Dr Thomas Brown, in presence of an enthusiastic audience; while, on the 18 May following, the East of Scotland shewed their appreciation of his services by choosing him to lay the foundation of the John Knox Memorial Church, hard by the house of the Reformer in the city of Edinburgh.

== Death and burial ==
During the last ten years of his life, Mr Campbell laboured under insidious disease, which gradually unhinged his whole nervous system, and rendered him increasingly and painfully unlike his former self. This state of things was much aggravated by several accidents, by which his head was severely injured. He partially recovered strength; but after much suffering, he died at Leamington on 5 January 1869, having just completed the fifty-seventh year of his age.

Mr Campbell's remains were buried in the vault within St Mary's Church, Warwick, where his father and his only son are also interred.

== Family ==
In May 1844 Mr Campbell married Christina, only child of Sir Duncan Cameron of Fassfern, with whom he had three daughters, the eldest of whom was the wife of Henry Spencer Lucy, Esq., of Charlecote Park, Warwickshire; and the second was married to Colonel J. P. W. Campbell of the Bengal Staff Corps.

Parliament of the United Kingdom
Preceded by Walter Frederick Campbell	Member of Parliament for Argyllshire; 1841–1843	Succeeded by Duncan McNeill
