= Iain MacCormick =

Scottish politician (1939–2014)

Member of Parliament for Argyll
- In office 28 February 1974 – 7 April 1979
- Preceded by: Michael Noble
- Succeeded by: John MacKay

Personal details
- Born: Iain Somerled MacDonald MacCormick; 28 September 1939 Glasgow, Scotland
- Died: 19 September 2014 (aged 74)
- Party: Scottish National Party

Iain Somerled MacDonald MacCormick (28 September 1939 – 19 September 2014) was a Scottish National Party (SNP) politician.

== Early life ==
MacCormick was born in Glasgow. He was educated at the High School of Glasgow and Glasgow University. He worked as a computer salesman, before leaving Glasgow in 1965 to become a teacher at Oban High School.

== Political career ==
MacCormick belonged to a family steeped in nationalist politics: his father John MacCormick was one of the founders of the SNP, while his brother Neil was, from 1999 to 2004, one of Scotland's Members of the European Parliament, again for the Nationalists. He stood as the SNP candidate for Member of Parliament for Argyll in 1970. On his second attempt, MacCormick was elected Member of Parliament for Argyll at the February 1974 general election, gaining the seat from the Conservatives. He was re-elected in October 1974. At the 1979 general election he was defeated by the Conservative John MacKay. He was then elected to the Argyll and Bute District Council, after standing in a by-election in September 1979.

MacCormick was one of the original members of the Social Democratic Party (SDP), founded in 1981. He later returned to the SNP.

MacCormick died on the night of 19 September 2014 aged 74.

== Bibliography ==
- Times Guide to the House of Commons 1979
- Who's Who (155th edition, 2003)
- Leigh Rayment's Historical List of MPs

Parliament of the United Kingdom
Preceded by Michael Noble	Member of Parliament for Argyll; February 1974–1979	Succeeded by John MacKay
