= 1940 Argyllshire by-election =

The 1940 Argyllshire by-election was a parliamentary by-election for the British House of Commons constituency of Argyllshire, on 10 April 1940.

== Vacancy ==
The by-election was caused by the death of the sitting Unionist MP, Frederick Alexander Macquisten on 29 February 1940 at the age of 69. He had been MP here since gaining the seat in 1924.

== Election history ==
Argyllshire had been won by the Unionists at every election since 1924 but was a marginal seat in which the Liberal Party had continued to challenge strongly. The result at the last General election was as follows;

1935 general election : Argyllshire
Party	Candidate	Votes	%	±%
Unionist	Frederick Alexander Macquisten	13,260	53.6	N/A
Liberal	Basil Andrew Murray	11,486	46.4	New
Majority		1,774	7.2	N/A
Turnout		24,746	56.6	N/A
Unionist hold		Swing	N/A	

== Candidates ==
- In August 1939 with the expectation of an imminent General Election, the local Unionists had replaced Macquisten as candidate with 52-year-old Duncan McCallum. He was serving as an Honorary Attaché at the British Legations in Bulgaria and Egypt.
- Back in 1938 the local Liberals had selected 37-year-old John Bannerman to regain the seat at the forthcoming General Election. He was a former Scottish Rugby Union International. Bannerman became active in Liberal politics from the 1930s. He was particularly interested in the problems of depopulation and unemployment for ordinary people in the Scottish Highlands and islands.
- Although the Labour party had not contested the seat since 1929, in January 1939 they selected A. MacNeill Weir, a relative of Lauchlin MacNeill Weir who had fought the seat in 1918.

At the outbreak of war, the Conservative, Liberal and Labour parties had agreed an electoral truce which meant that when a by-election occurred, the party that was defending the seat would not be opposed by an official candidate from the other two parties. Approaches were made by the Liberals to the Unionists for them to support Bannerman being returned rather than their own candidate. However, with the Liberal Party sitting in opposition to the Chamberlain led Government, this was never likely to happen. Both Bannerman and Weir duly withdrew.

On the 8 March, the Scottish National Party decided to contest the election. On 12 March, they chose as their candidate, 66-year-old William Power who was a journalist from Glasgow.

== Campaign ==
Polling day was set for 10 April 1940. When nominations closed, it was to reveal a two horse race, between McCallum for the Unionists and Power, for the Nationalists.

McCallum was in Egypt at the time of the death of Macquisten and remained there until returning to Scotland after his first campaign meeting on 26 March 1940, more than two weeks after he knew he would be opposed.

Half of the constituency was in a restricted area, and candidates and speakers were required to obtain permits to pass in and out. The authorities rejected the permit applications of the Nationalist candidate, effectively restricting his movements.

The SNP campaign sought to highlight government neglect of the Highlands. Power chose not to disagree with the government's foreign policy.

Neville Chamberlain sent a message to McCallum stating, We are fighting for just and durable peace which will restore freedom and security to Europe and rid us of the perpetual menace of war. The Premier expressed the hope that "the electors of Argyllshire will send you to Parliament by such a majority as will provide convincing evidence of the national unity of purpose in the prosecution of the war."

== Result ==
As expected the Unionists held the seat. The SNP polled over 7,000 votes, the majority of which were believed to be from the 11,000 people who voted Liberal last time.

1940 Argyllshire by-election
Party	Candidate	Votes	%	±%
Unionist	Duncan McCallum	12,317	62.8	+9.2
SNP	William Power	7,308	37.2	New
Majority		5,009	25.6	+17.3
Turnout		19,625	47.9	−8.7
Unionist hold		Swing	N/A	

== Aftermath ==
McCallum took his seat on the benches behind Neville Chamberlain, but within a month, Chamberlain had been replaced by Winston Churchill. This result catapulted Power into the leadership of the SNP. However, it did not represent any progression for the SNP in Argyll as the party did not contest the seat at the following General election. Instead both Liberal and Labour candidates who had withdrawn from the by-election came forward to challenge McCallum; The result at the following General election;

General election 1945: Argyllshire
Party	Candidate	Votes	%	±%
Unionist	Duncan McCallum	15,791	56.6	+3.0
Labour	A MacNeill Weir	8,889	31.9	New
Liberal	John MacDonald Bannerman	3,228	11.6	−34.8
Majority		6,902	24.7	+17.5
Turnout		27,908	63.9	+7.3
Unionist hold		Swing		

== See also ==
- List of United Kingdom by-elections
- United Kingdom by-election records
