= 1903 Argyllshire by-election =

UK parliamentary by-election

The 1903 Argyllshire by-election was a Parliamentary by-election held on 26 August 1903. The constituency returned one Member of Parliament (MP) to the House of Commons of the United Kingdom, elected by the first past the post voting system.

== Vacancy ==
Donald Ninian Nicol had been Conservative MP for the seat of Argyllshire since the 1895 general election. He died on 27 July 1903 at the age of 60.

== Electoral history ==
The seat had been Conservative since they gained it in 1895. They easily held the seat at the last election, with an increased majority;

John Ainsworth

General election January 1900 Electorate 10,405
Party	Candidate	Votes	%	±%
Conservative	Donald Nicol (MP)	3,834	54.2	+3.3
Liberal	John Stirling Ainsworth	3,234	45.8	−3.3
Majority		600	8.4	+6.6
Turnout		7,068	67.9	−6.6
Conservative hold		Swing	+3.3	

== Candidates ==
The local Conservative Association selected 63-year-old Charles Stewart as their candidate to defend the seat. He was a solicitor.

The local Liberal Association selected 59-year-old John Stirling Ainsworth as their candidate to gain the seat. Ainsworth contested the Barrow-in-Furness constituency at the 1886 general election and Argyllshire in 1900. He commanded the 3rd Volunteer Battalion, the Border Regiment from 1898-1902.

== Campaign ==
Polling Day was fixed for the 26 August 1903, just 30 days after the previous MP died.

== Result ==
The Liberals gained the seat from the Conservatives;

1903 Argyllshire by-election Electorate 10,643
Party	Candidate	Votes	%	±%
Liberal	John Stirling Ainsworth	4,326	61.2	+15.4
Conservative	Charles Stewart	2,740	38.8	−15.4
Majority		1,586	22.4	N/A
Turnout		7,066	66.4	−1.5
Liberal gain from Conservative		Swing	+15.4	

== Aftermath ==
At the following General Election the result was;

General election January 1906 Electorate 11,216
Party	Candidate	Votes	%	±%
Liberal	John Stirling Ainsworth	4,507	59.9	+14.1
Conservative	George Hutchison	3,012	40.1	−14.1
Majority		1,495	19.8	N/A
Turnout		7,519	67.0	−0.9
Liberal hold		Swing	+14.1	
