= 1958 Argyll by-election =

UK parliamentary by-election

The 1958 Argyll by-election of 12 June 1958 was held after the death of Conservative Party MP Duncan McCallum.

The seat was safe, having been won at the 1955 United Kingdom general election by over 10,000 votes On the eve of the by-election The Glasgow Herald said the campaign had been "strenuously", but cleanly fought by the candidates. It also noted that while Labour's candidate, Robert Young, had predicted a victory for himself, such a result would be a surprise, with the contest being seen as a battle between the Unionists (as the Conservatives in Scotland were styled) and the Liberals.

== Result of the previous general election ==
General election 1955: Argyll
Party	Candidate	Votes	%	±%
Conservative	Duncan McCallum	19,119	67.77	
Labour	Robert M. Young	9,091	32.23	
Majority		10,028	35.54	
Turnout		28,210	66.9	−0.2
Conservative hold		Swing		

== Result of the by-election ==
By-election 1958: Argyll
Party	Candidate	Votes	%	±%
Conservative	Michael Noble	12,541	46.79	−20.98
Liberal	William D. McKean	7,375	27.52	New
Labour	Robert M. Young	6,884	25.69	−6.54
Majority		5,166	19.27	−16.28
Turnout		26,800		
Conservative hold		Swing		

== Aftermath ==
While Noble held the seat for the Unionists, their majority was significantly reduced, while the Liberal Party pushed Labour into third place. After his victory Noble said that his win represented "a vote of confidence in the Government" as he had fought the contest "entirely on the Government's record". In contrast McKean said that the result meant that the constituency was "no longer a safe Tory seat". He also claimed that the contest had been a "trial run" for the next general election and the Liberals would be ready to fight it. The Glasgow Herald noted that the election was the first time the Liberals had contested Argyll since 1945, further commenting that "the Argyll Liberal Party re-formed only a few months before the by-election". The newspaper stated that given this, the Liberals had "every reason to be pleased" with the result they had achieved.

Young claimed that the "anti-government vote" had been split, but argued that despite winning the seat the Conservative government could not "view the result with any great satisfaction." He also announced that he would not contest the seat again in the future, this being the third time that he had stood in Argyll and failed to be elected.

Ultimately the Liberals did contest the seat at the next year's general election, but their new candidate Gerard Noel could only finish in third place, with Labour regaining second spot. The Labour vote share actually remained relatively static, with Noble's vote share increasing from 46.8% to 58.4%, with the Liberal vote share dropping from 27.5% to 15.7%. However both the Labour and Conservative share were down on their 1955 levels.
