= William Sutherland (Liberal politician) =

British politician (1880–1949)

The Right Honourable Sir William Sutherland KCB
- Sutherland c. 1910–20

Chancellor of the Duchy of Lancaster
- In office 7 April – 19 October 1922
- Prime Minister: David Lloyd George
- Preceded by: The Viscount Peel
- Succeeded by: The Marquess of Salisbury

Personal details
- Born: 4 March 1880
- Died: 19 September 1949 (aged 69)
- Education: Glasgow University

Sir William Sutherland, KCB, PC (4 March 1880 – 19 September 1949) was a Scottish civil servant, Liberal Party politician and colliery owner. He was closely associated with Prime Minister David Lloyd George serving as his private and press secretary and later as his Parliamentary Private Secretary. He was one of Lloyd George's go-betweens in the sale of honours for the Lloyd George Fund. In his dealings with the press he would certainly have been labelled a spin doctor if that phrase had currency in the early twentieth century, indeed he has recently been described as "the first of the modern spin doctors".

== Family and education ==
Sutherland was born in Glasgow, the son of Alan Sutherland. He was educated at The High School of Glasgow and at Glasgow University where he gained an MA degree., and was admitted to the Middle Temple on 18 January 1904, withdrawing without being Called to the Bar on 3 March 1927. On 27 August 1921 he married Annie Christine Fountain, CBE of Birthwaite Hall, near Barnsley. The wedding was attended by Prime Minister David Lloyd George and Mrs Lloyd George. His wife died in 1949. His uncle, Angus Sutherland was Liberal MP for Sutherland from 1886 to 1894.

== Career ==
Sutherland entered the civil service after leaving university and was appointed to the Board of Trade. This was where he first attracted Lloyd George's attention when he was President of the Board of Trade. Sutherland helped Lloyd George prepare and develop some of his legislation. He made a particular study of the Land question and between 1909 and 1913 he wrote tracts or books entitled The Call of the Land, The Land Question and Rural Regeneration. He was also involved in the preparation of the legislation on Old Age Pensions and National Insurance and assisted in the implementation of these measures. In 1907 he wrote Old Age Pensions, in Theory and Practice, with Some Foreign Examples (published by Methuen). He followed Lloyd George to the Ministry of Munitions, the War Office and, eventually to Number 10 Downing Street. He also wrote a one shilling pamphlet in 1920 about the work of Coalition government of David Lloyd George, However the work was dismissed by The Times as "no more than a child’s guide for Coalition candidates and other apologists of the government".

== Politics ==
=== Lloyd George fund raiser ===
From his administrative and then Parliamentary association with Lloyd George, Sutherland developed an increasingly close political connection to the Prime Minister. In the run up to the 1918 general election, he was used as a fund-raiser from wealthy sources. He was described by political insider and newspaper magnate Lord Riddell as "...an amusing, cynical dog". He was a major participant in the honours scandal through which Lloyd George was able to build up his war-chest, the Lloyd George Fund. Martin Pugh has called Sutherland "an unsavoury character" who, together with Maundy Gregory, Lloyd George used to raise money by lavishly dispensing honours at inflated prices and he had a reputation for indulging in the good life by hawking baronetcies at London Clubs.

=== Policy adviser ===
In 1918 Sutherland assisted Lloyd George in building a case to discredit Major-General Sir Frederick Maurice in the circumstances surrounding the Maurice Debate. He was one of Lloyd George's closest policy advisers. He understood that the old Liberal themes of education, Free trade and temperance had lost their resonance with the electorate. In their place he urged an emphasis on social and economic issues. This analysis harked back to the social liberalism of the Liberal Governments of 1908–1914 and certainly pre-figured the radical direction Liberal policy took in the later 1920s when Lloyd George was reinstated as party leader and commissioned the series of ‘coloured books’ on land, industry and employment policy which formed the basis of the Liberal manifesto for the 1929 general election. Sutherland also participated in the building up of the Coalition Liberal organisation in the constituencies, particularly in Scotland and took charge of the publicity programme. His warnings on the need to have good constituency organisation if the Lloyd George National Liberals were going to possess effective local influence went largely unheeded however.

=== Press fixer ===
Lloyd George also employed Sutherland to further his interests with the press. He built up useful relations with newspaper editors in order to promote Lloyd George's achievements and the record of the Coalition. In his role as go-between with Lloyd George and the journalists in the Lobby he acquired the nickname ‘Bronco Bill’ Sutherland (the media circus ringmaster in the age of the press lords) and would allegedly invent damaging stories about Lloyd George's political opponents, which were then published in the press as genuine – although he was never named as the source. Lloyd George retained a high regard for Sutherland. As late as 1932 he was referring to him as "...one of the best and cutest politicians of the day."

=== Political appointments and honours ===
Sutherland was Secretary to the Cabinet Committee on the Supply of Munitions in 1915 and then became Private Secretary to Lloyd George as Minister of Munitions, (1915–16). He continued as Lloyd George's private secretary when Lloyd George was appointed Secretary of State for War between June and December 1916. When Lloyd George became Prime Minister in December 1916, Sutherland accompanied him to 10 Downing Street in the role of private and press secretary. He was knighted in 1919, being awarded the KCB. He was also appointed as a Commander of the Order of Leopold.

=== Elected to Parliament ===
It can have come as no surprise when, in 1918, Sutherland secured the nomination to fight the general election as Coalition Liberal candidate for Argyllshire. As a representative of the Coalition Government he would have received the Coalition Coupon although his only opponent in the election was a candidate from the Highland Land League and Sutherland was returned easily with over 80% of the poll.

=== Government appointments ===
Between 1918 and 1920, Sutherland served as the Prime Minister's Parliamentary Private Secretary. In 1920 he was made a Lord of the Treasury to enable him to fulfil the role of the Scottish whip, a position he held until 1922. In that year he was made a Privy Councillor after which he was entitled to be styled the ‘Right Honourable’. Also in 1922 he briefly achieved Cabinet rank with his appointment as Chancellor of the Duchy of Lancaster.

=== By-election in Argyllshire ===
On appointment as a Lord of the Treasury (an office of profit under the Crown) in 1920, Sutherland was obliged under the constitutional requirements of the day to fight a by-election in Argyllshire. He faced no opposition from his party's Unionist allies in the Coalition Government and the decision of the Independent Asquithian Liberals not to oppose him enabled him to retain the seat in a straight fight with Labour, albeit with a reduced majority. He was not required to fight again on his appointment as Chancellor of the Duchy of Lancaster as he was already a profit holder.

=== 1922–1924 ===
With the fall of the Coalition Sutherland's ministerial career ended. He held his seat at the 1923 general election but was beaten in 1924 in a three-cornered contest by the Conservatives. He did agree to stand as a Liberal at the general election of 1929 in Barnsley. He claimed second place to Labour but this was by the wide margin of 9,338 votes.

== Colliery owner ==
After he left Parliament Sir William pursued interests in the coal industry. He was a director of the Wharncliffe Woodmoor Colliery, near Barnsley and owner of the Woolley group of collieries in the same area. He was also managing director of Fountain and Burnley Ltd, which owned the North Gawber colliery.

== Sutherland Cup ==
Sir William's name survives attached to the shinty knockout competition to which he donated a trophy in 1922, the Sir William Sutherland Cup. This cup is the national junior championship for shinty in Scotland.

== Death ==
Sutherland died at Sheffield on 19 September 1949 aged 69 years.

Parliament of the United Kingdom
Preceded by Sir John Ainsworth, Bt	Member of Parliament for Argyllshire; 1918–1924	Succeeded by F. A. Macquisten
Political offices
Preceded by The Viscount Peel	Chancellor of the Duchy of Lancaster; April–October 1922	Succeeded by The Marquess of Salisbury
