= Sir Archibald Campbell, 3rd Baronet =

British Conservative politician

Sir Archibald Campbell Bt

Member of Parliament for Argyllshire
- In office 6 June 1851 – 23 April 1857
- Preceded by: Duncan McNeill
- Succeeded by: Alexander Struthers Finlay

Personal details
- Born: 15 May 1825
- Died: 11 September 1866 (aged 41)
- Party: Conservative
- Spouse: Agnes Grosvenor (m. 1858)
- Parent(s): John Campbell; Anna Jane Sitwell

Sir Archibald Islay Campbell, 3rd Baronet (15 May 1825 – 11 September 1866) was a British Conservative politician.

Campbell was the son of John Campbell, Tory MP for Dunbartonshire from 1826 to 1830, and Anna Jane née Sitwell. In 1858, he married Lady Agnes Grosvenor, daughter of Richard Grosvenor, 2nd Marquess of Westminster and Lady Elizabeth Mary née Leveson-Gower.

Campbell was elected Conservative MP for Argyllshire at an 1851 by-election—caused by Duncan McNeill's resignation upon being appointed a senator of the College of Justice—and held the seat until 1857 when he did not seek re-election.

He became the 3rd Baronet of Succoth on 23 July 1846, upon the death of Sir Archibald Campbell, 2nd Baronet. Upon his own death, the title was passed to his younger brother, Sir George Campbell, 4th Baronet.

Parliament of the United Kingdom
Preceded by Duncan McNeill	Member of Parliament for Argyllshire; 1851–1857	Succeeded by Alexander Struthers Finlay
Baronetage of the United Kingdom
Preceded by Archibald Campbell	Baronet (of Succoth); 1846–1866	Succeeded by George Campbell
