= Argyll and Bute (UK Parliament constituency) =

UK Parliament constituency (1983–2024)

Coordinates: 55.933°N 5.349°W

- Former county constituency for the House of Commons
- Boundary of Argyll and Bute in Scotland
- Major settlements: Campbeltown, Dunoon, Helensburgh, Lochgilphead, Rothesay, Oban

1983–2024
- Created from: Argyll; Bute and Northern Ayrshire
- Replaced by: Argyll, Bute and South Lochaber

Argyll and Bute was a county constituency of the House of Commons of the Parliament of the United Kingdom. It was created for the 1983 general election, merging most of Argyll with some of Bute and Northern Ayrshire, and then superseded by Argyll, Bute and South Lochaber in the 2023 review of Westminster constituencies.

Under the 2023 review of Westminster constituencies, the constituency now comprises the vast majority of the new Argyll, Bute and South Lochaber constituency, first contested at the 2024 general election.

== Boundaries ==
Map of boundaries 2005–2024

1983–2005: Argyll and Bute District.

2005–2024: The area of the Argyll and Bute Council.

When created in 1983, the constituency covered the area of the Argyll and Bute district of the Strathclyde region. In 2005 it was enlarged to cover the Argyll and Bute council area, which had been created in 1996. Thus Helensburgh, already included within the new council area, was included in the constituency. Helensburgh had been within the Dunbarton district until 1996, and within the Dumbarton constituency until 2005.

== Politics ==
Argyll and Bute was one of the few four-way marginal constituencies in the UK. The Liberal Democrats held the seat from 1987, when they took it from the Conservatives, until 2015 when the SNP won the seat. The equivalent seat to Argyll and Bute in the Scottish Parliament was lost to the SNP in 2007, with Labour representing the overlapping constituency of Dumbarton to the southeast covering Helensburgh and Lomond. Since 2017, the Scottish Conservatives have been the main challengers in the seat.

== Members of Parliament ==
Election	Member	Party
1983	John MacKay	Conservative
1987	Ray Michie	Liberal
1988	Ray Michie	Liberal Democrats
2001	Alan Reid	Liberal Democrats
2015	Brendan O'Hara	SNP

== Election results ==
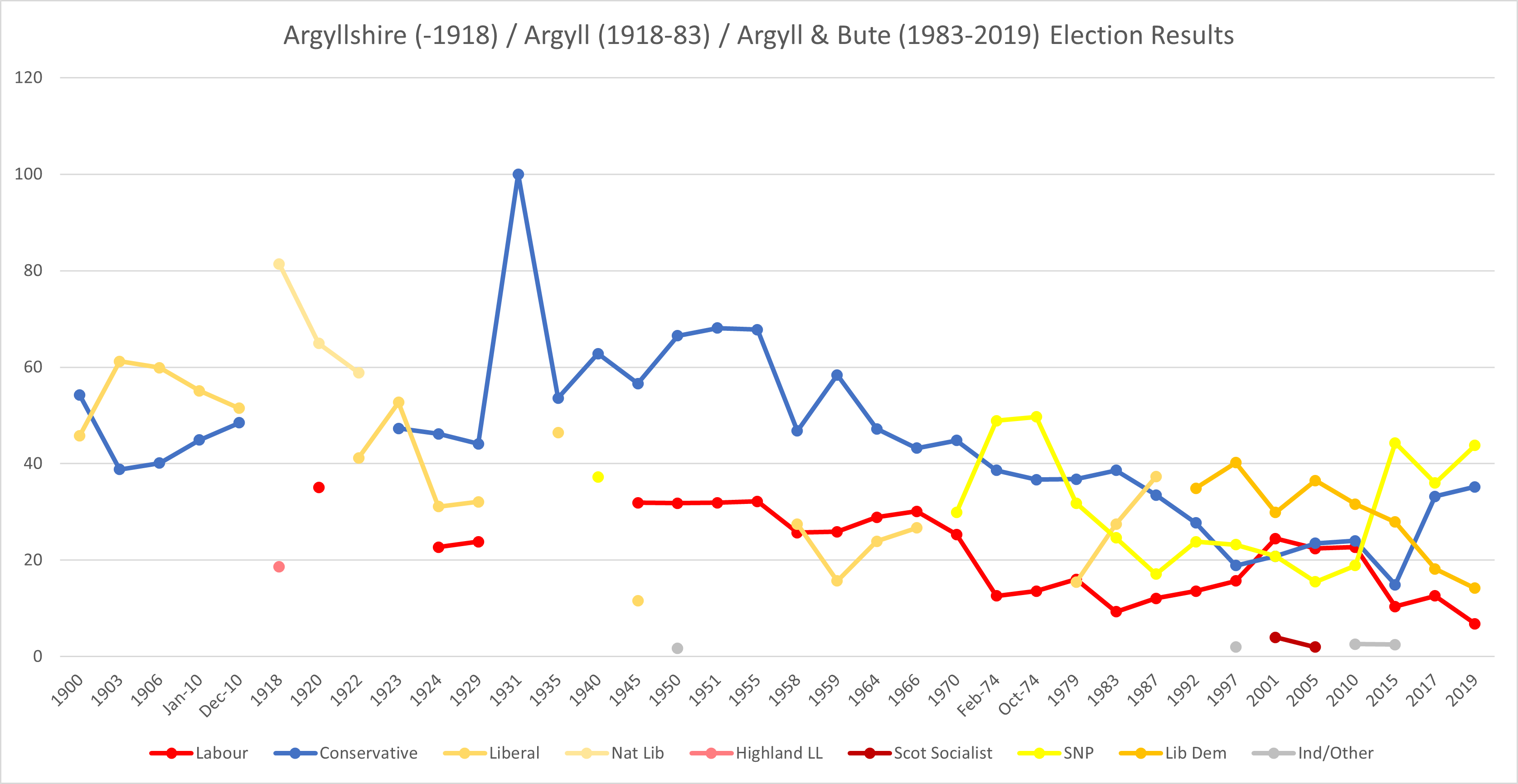
Argyllshire (1900–1918) / Argyll (1918–1983) / Argyll & Bute (1983–2019) Election Results

=== Elections in the 2010s ===
General election 2019: Argyll and Bute
Party	Candidate	Votes	%	±%
SNP	Brendan O'Hara	21,040	43.8	+7.8
Conservative	Gary Mulvaney	16,930	35.2	+2.0
Liberal Democrats	Alan Reid	6,832	14.2	−4.0
Labour	Rhea Barnes	3,248	6.8	−5.8
Majority		4,110	8.6	+5.8
Turnout		48,050	72.2	+0.7
SNP hold		Swing	+2.9	

General election 2017: Argyll and Bute
Party	Candidate	Votes	%	±%
SNP	Brendan O'Hara	17,304	36.0	−8.3
Conservative	Gary Mulvaney	15,976	33.2	+18.3
Liberal Democrats	Alan Reid	8,745	18.2	−9.7
Labour	Michael Kelly	6,044	12.6	+2.2
Majority		1,328	2.8	−13.6
Turnout		48,069	71.5	−3.8
SNP hold		Swing	−13.3	

General election 2015: Argyll and Bute
Party	Candidate	Votes	%	±%
SNP	Brendan O'Hara	22,959	44.3	+25.4
Liberal Democrats	Alan Reid	14,486	27.9	−3.7
Conservative	Alastair Redman	7,733	14.9	−9.1
Labour	Mary Galbraith	5,394	10.4	−12.3
UKIP	Caroline Santos	1,311	2.5	New
Majority		8,473	16.4	N/A
Turnout		51,883	75.3	+8.0
SNP gain from Liberal Democrats		Swing	+14.5	

General election 2010: Argyll and Bute
Party	Candidate	Votes	%	±%
Liberal Democrats	Alan Reid	14,292	31.6	−4.9
Conservative	Gary Mulvaney	10,861	24.0	+0.5
Labour	David Graham	10,274	22.7	+0.3
SNP	Mike MacKenzie	8,563	18.9	+3.4
Green	Elaine Morrison	789	1.7	New
Independent	George Doyle	272	0.6	New
Scottish Jacobite	John Black	156	0.3	New
Majority		3,431	7.6	−5.4
Turnout		45,207	67.3	+3.1
Liberal Democrats hold		Swing	−2.7	

=== Elections in the 2000s ===
General election 2005: Argyll and Bute
Party	Candidate	Votes	%	±%
Liberal Democrats	Alan Reid	15,786	36.5	+3.7
Conservative	Jamie McGrigor	10,150	23.5	−0.2
Labour	Carolyn Manson	9,696	22.4	−0.3
SNP	Isobel Strong	6,716	15.5	−2.0
Scottish Socialist	Deirdre Henderson	881	2.0	−1.4
Majority		5,636	13.0	+7.6
Turnout		43,229	64.2	+4.1
Liberal Democrats hold		Swing	+2.0	

General election 2001: Argyll and Bute
Party	Candidate	Votes	%	±%
Liberal Democrats	Alan Reid	9,245	29.9	−10.3
Labour	Hugh J.E. Raven	7,592	24.5	+8.8
Conservative	Dave Petrie	6,436	20.8	+1.9
SNP	Agnes Samuel	6,433	20.8	−2.4
Scottish Socialist	Des Divers	1,251	4.0	New
Majority		1,653	5.4	−11.6
Turnout		30,957	63.0	−9.9
Liberal Democrats hold		Swing	−9.6	

=== Elections in the 1990s ===
General election 1997: Argyll and Bute
Party	Candidate	Votes	%	±%
Liberal Democrats	Ray Michie	14,359	40.2	+5.3
SNP	Neil MacCormick	8,278	23.2	−0.6
Conservative	Ralph Leishman	6,774	18.9	−8.8
Labour	Ali A. Syed	5,596	15.7	+2.1
Referendum	Michael Stewart	713	2.0	New
Majority		6,081	17.0	+9.8
Turnout		35,720	72.9	−3.2
Liberal Democrats hold		Swing	+3.0	

General election 1992: Argyll and Bute
Party	Candidate	Votes	%	±%
Liberal Democrats	Ray Michie	12,739	34.9	−2.4
Conservative	John Corrie	10,117	27.7	−5.8
SNP	Neil MacCormick	8,689	23.8	+6.7
Labour	Des Browne	4,946	13.6	+1.5
Majority		2,622	7.2	+3.4
Turnout		36,491	76.1	+0.6
Liberal Democrats hold		Swing	+1.7	

=== Elections in the 1980s ===
General election 1987: Argyll and Bute
Party	Candidate	Votes	%	±%
Liberal	Ray Michie	13,726	37.3	+9.8
Conservative	John MacKay	12,332	33.5	−5.1
SNP	Robert Shaw	6,297	17.1	−7.5
Labour	Desmond Tierney	4,437	12.1	+2.8
Majority		1,394	3.8	N/A
Turnout		36,792	75.5	+2.6
Liberal gain from Conservative		Swing	+7.5	

General election 1983: Argyll and Bute
Party	Candidate	Votes	%	±%
Conservative	John MacKay	13,380	38.6	−1.7
Liberal	Ray Michie	9,536	27.5	+13.7
SNP	Ian Smith	8,514	24.6	−4.6
Labour	Charles McCafferty	3,204	9.3	−7.4
Majority		3,844	11.1	
Turnout		34,634	72.9	
Conservative win (new seat)				
