= Ainsworth baronets =

Baronetcy in the Baronetage of the United Kingdom

- Escutcheon of the Ainsworth baronets of Ardanaiseig
- Creation date: 1917
- Status: extant

The Ainsworth Baronetcy, of Ardnanaiseig in the County of Argyll, is a title in the Baronetage of the United Kingdom. It was created on 12 January 1917 for the industrialist, banker and Liberal politician John Ainsworth.

== Ainsworth baronets, of Ardanaiseig (1917) ==
- Sir John Stirling Ainsworth, 1st Baronet (1844–1923)
- Sir Thomas Ainsworth, 2nd Baronet (1886–1971)
- Sir John Francis Ainsworth, 3rd Baronet (1912–1981)
- Sir (Thomas) David Ainsworth, 4th Baronet (1926–1999)
- Sir Anthony Thomas Hugh Ainsworth, 5th Baronet (born 1962, succeeded to the title 1999)

The heir presumptive is Charles David Ainsworth (born 1966).
