= Duncan McCallum =

Scottish Unionist Party politician (1888–1958)

Sir Duncan McCallum MC

Member of Parliament for Argyllshire
- In office 1940–1950
- Preceded by: F. A. Macquisten
- Succeeded by: Constituency renamed

Member of Parliament for Argyll
- In office 1950–1958
- Preceded by: Constituency renamed
- Succeeded by: Michael Noble

Personal details
- Born: 24 November 1888 Fulham, London, England
- Died: 10 May 1958 (aged 69) Glasgow, Scotland
- Party: Scottish Unionist
- Spouse: Violet Mary Hope (m. 1925)
- Parent: Colin Whitton McCallum (father)
- Education: Filey School; Christ's Hospital; Gonville and Caius College, Cambridge
- Military career
- Allegiance: United Kingdom
- Branch: British Army
- Service years: 1914-1918
- Unit: East Yorkshire Regiment
- Conflicts: World War I
- Awards: MC; Mentioned in Despatches

Sir Duncan McCallum (24 November 1888 – 10 May 1958) was a Scottish Unionist Party politician. He was elected Member of Parliament (MP) for Argyllshire by a 1940 by-election. McCallum remained as MP for the constituency (renamed Argyll in 1950) until his death in 1958.

McCallum was born on 24 November 1888 in Fulham, London, the son of Colin Whitton McCallum (the British music entertainer known as Charles Coborn). McCallum was educated at Filey School, Christ's Hospital and Gonville and Caius College, Cambridge. He won a Military Cross and was Mentioned in Despatches during the First World War for which his service took him to the Cameroons and to France. The years that followed the end of hostilities were scarcely less adventurous for him, for between 1920 and 1924 he was British liaison officer with the French in Syria and participated with a pioneering journey across the Syrian Desert in 1923. A party consisting of McCallum, Mr. Palmer, Consul in Damascus, Mahommed Ibn Bassam, a gold trader, drove from Syria to Baghdad in three cars, a Buick, an Oldsmobile, and a Lancia. This was the first official reconnaissance of the trans-desert route.

He performed an even more ambitious journey in 1927. His regiment, The East Yorkshire, was quartered in Tientsin (now Tianjin), China, and he was Commandant of the British Legation Guard at Peking (now Beijing). He conceived the idea of motoring from Peking to London and was granted leave and permission for that purpose.

The expedition, which included his wife, left in two Buick cars in June 1927. They motored to Tientsin and then went by sea to Haiphong in Vietnam, the Chinese Civil War making an overland journey from north to south China impracticable. From Haiphong they went north to the Chinese frontier and then, turning south again, followed the line of the ancient Mandarin Road, the highway from China to Siam (now Thailand), through the rice-fields of Tonkin, (now the north of Vietnam), down the coast of Annam (central Vietnam), across the great plain of Cochin-China (southern Vietnam) to Saigon (now Ho Chi Minh City), and thence to Angkor and the Siamese frontier.

The party entrained at Bangkok, entered Malaya through Kedah, traveling south to Singapore, there taking ship to Rangoon and thence by sea to Calcutta, after spending a week trying to find an overland route into Burma. After reaching Calcutta they drove across India by way of Lahore, Peshawar, and Quetta, across the Balochistan desert, through north-eastern Persia to Meshed; thence to Teheran, Baghdad, Damascus, and Beirut. They reached London in May 1928, after a journey of 15,200 miles (24,500 km) of actual driving, with only one serious mishap but no shortage of "near misses". The journey from Constantinople (Istanbul) was through Bulgaria at the time an earthquake occurred, and the party arrived from Adrianople at the village of Papazali the day after it had been laid in ruins. The journey was recounted by McCallum in his book China to Chelsea: A Modern Pilgrimage Along Ancient Highways (1930).

Subsequently, he served as an honorary attaché at British legations in Bulgaria and Egypt in 1939 and 1940, and Conservative member of Parliament for Argyll from 1940 to 1958. He was known as a successful breeder of pedigree Highland cattle and was a member of the Highlands and Islands Advisory Panel from 1947. He received a knighthood in 1955.

In 1925, McCallum married Violet Mary, daughter of J. L. A. Hope, and widow of Captain E. A. Hume. McCallum died on 10 May 1958, in a Glasgow nursing home. He was 69.

Parliament of the United Kingdom
Preceded by F. A. Macquisten	Member of Parliament for Argyllshire; 1940–1950	Constituency renamed
New constituency previously Argyllshire	Member of Parliament for Argyll; 1950–1958	Succeeded by Michael Noble
