= Highland Land League (1909) =

Scottish political group active 1909-1920s

- Founded: 1909
- Dissolved: 1920s
- Preceded by: Highland Land League; Crofters Party
- Merged into: Labour and Scots National League
- Ideology: Land Reform; Nationalisation; Scottish Home Rule; Crofter interests
- Political position: Left-wing

Highlighted in pink are constituencies in which the League stood in the 1918 election.

The Highland Land League founded in 1909 was a left wing political party active in Scotland in the early twentieth century. It was separate from, although a conscious imitation of, the late 19th century Highland Land League.

It was founded in Glasgow, in 1909 as a political party. This organisation was a broadly left-wing group that sought the restoration of deer forests to public ownership, abolition of plural farms and the nationalisation of the land. Also they resolved to resolutely defend crofters facing eviction by their landlords and they supported home rule for Scotland.

During the First World War (1914 to 1918) politicians made lavish promises about reform which would follow the war, and of course many croftsmen lost their lives in the war itself. After the war the words of politicians did not translate into action, but croftmen returning from the war were in no mood to accept government inaction. Land raids began again. At this time the Easter Rising was recent history in Ireland, as was the Communist revolution in Russia.

In August 1918 the new Land League had affiliated with the Labour Party, with four candidates for the 1918 general election being joint League-Labour. They were the only opposition to the Coalition candidate in Argyllshire in 1918 and backed the unsuccessful Labour candidate in the 1920 by election.

By the 1920s the League had fully merged with Labour, under the unfulfilled promise of autonomy for Scotland were Labour to gain power in the forthcoming years. Land League members were then key to the formation of the Scottish National Party in 1934.
