= Argyllshire (UK Parliament constituency) =

Parliamentary constituency in the United Kingdom, 1801–1983

- Former county constituency for the House of Commons
- Subdivision: Argyllshire

1708–1983
- Seats: One
- Replaced by: Argyll and Bute and Inverness, Nairn and Lochaber

Argyllshire was a county constituency of the House of Commons of the Parliament of Great Britain from 1708 to 1800 and of the House of Commons of the Parliament of the United Kingdom from 1801 until 1983. The constituency was named Argyll from 1950. The constituency was replaced in 1983 with Argyll and Bute.

It elected one Member of Parliament (MP) using the first-past-the-post voting system.

== Creation ==
The British parliamentary constituency was created in 1708 following the Acts of Union 1707 and replaced the former Parliament of Scotland shire constituency of Argyllshire .

== Local government areas ==
Until Scottish counties were abolished, for most purposes, in 1975, the constituency represented the county of Argyll, except that constituency boundaries may not have coincided at all times with county boundaries, and any parliamentary burgh within the county would have been outside the constituency.

In 1975 most of the county plus the Isle of Bute became the Argyll district of the Strathclyde region. A northern area of the county became part of the Highland region. Until 1975 the Isle of Bute had been part of the county of Bute.

In 1996, 13 years after the abolition of the Argyll constituency and creation of the Argyll and Bute constituency, the Argyll district, plus a portion of the Dumbarton district of Strathclyde, became the Argyll and Bute unitary council area.

== Members of Parliament ==
=== Argyllshire ===
Election	Member	Party
1708	Sir James Campbell, 2nd Baronet	
1736 by-election	Charles Campbell	
1742 by-election	James Stuart-Mackenzie	
1747	Sir Duncan Campbell of Lochnell	
1754	Dugald Campbell	
1764 by-election	Lord William Campbell	
1766 by-election	Robert Campbell	
1772 by-election	Adam Livingston	
1780	Lord Frederick Campbell	
1799 by-election	Lord John Campbell	Whig
1822 by-election	Walter Frederick Campbell	Whig
1832	James Henry Callander	Whig
1835	Walter Frederick Campbell	Whig
1841	Alexander Campbell	Conservative
1843 by-election	Duncan McNeill	Conservative
1851 by-election	Sir Archibald Campbell, 3rd Baronet	Conservative
1857	Alexander Struthers Finlay	Whig
1859	Alexander Struthers Finlay	Liberal
1868 by-election	Marquess of Lorne	Liberal
1878 by-election	Lord Colin Campbell	Liberal
1885	Donald Horne Macfarlane	Crofters' Party
1886	John Malcolm	Unionist
1892	Sir Donald Horne Macfarlane	Liberal
1895	Donald Nicol	Unionist Party
1903 by-election	John Ainsworth	Liberal
1918	Sir William Sutherland	Coalition Liberal
Jan 1922	Sir William Sutherland	National Liberal
1923	Sir William Sutherland	Liberal
1924	Frederick Alexander Macquisten	Unionist
1940 by-election	Sir Duncan McCallum	Unionist
1950	constituency renamed	

=== Argyll ===
Election	Member	Party
1950	Sir Duncan McCallum	Unionist
1958 (b)	Michael Noble	Unionist
Feb 1974	Iain MacCormick	Scottish National Party
1979	John Mackay	Conservative
1983	constituency abolished	

== Election results ==
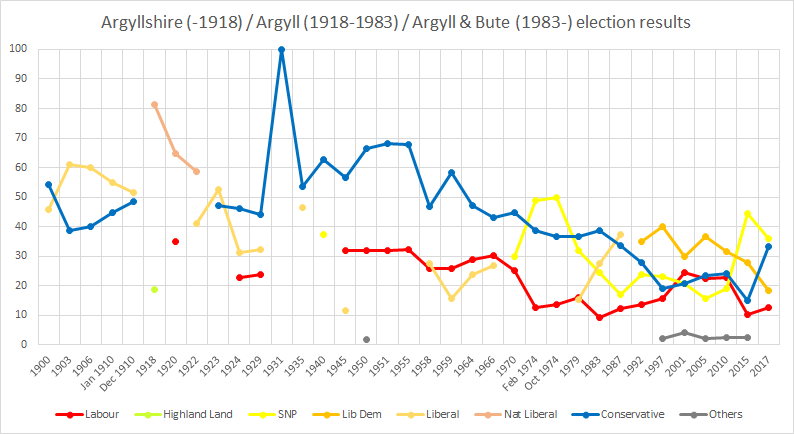
Argyll election results

Decades:	1840s; 1850s; 1860s; 1870s; 1880s; 1890s; 1900s; 1910s; 1920s; 1930s; 1940s; 1950s; 1960s; 1970s

=== Elections in the 1830s ===
General election 1830: Argyllshire
Party	Candidate	Votes	%
Whig	Walter Frederick Campbell	Unopposed	
Registered electors		114	
Whig hold			

General election 1831: Argyllshire
Party	Candidate	Votes	%
Whig	Walter Frederick Campbell	Unopposed	
Whig hold			

General election 1832: Argyllshire
Party	Candidate	Votes	%
Whig	James Henry Callander	Unopposed	
Registered electors		995	
Whig hold			

General election 1835: Argyllshire
Party	Candidate	Votes	%
Whig	Walter Frederick Campbell	Unopposed	
Registered electors		1,084	
Whig hold			

General election 1837: Argyllshire
Party	Candidate	Votes	%
Whig	Walter Frederick Campbell	712	60.6
Conservative	Alexander Campbell	462	39.4
Majority		250	21.2
Turnout		1,174	70.5
Registered electors		1,666	
Whig hold			

=== Elections in the 1840s ===
General election 1841: Argyllshire
Party	Candidate	Votes	%	±%
Conservative	Alexander Campbell	Unopposed		
Registered electors		1,600		
Conservative gain from Whig				

Campbell resigned by accepting the office of Steward of the Chiltern Hundreds, causing a by-election.

By-election, 8 September 1843: Argyllshire
Party	Candidate	Votes	%	±%
Conservative	Duncan McNeill	Unopposed		
Conservative hold				

General election 1847: Argyllshire
Party	Candidate	Votes	%	±%
Conservative	Duncan McNeill	Unopposed		
Registered electors		1,889		
Conservative hold				

=== Elections in the 1850s ===
McNeill resigned after being appointed a Senator of the College of Justice, becoming Lord Colonsay and causing a by-election.

By-election, 6 June 1851: Argyllshire
Party	Candidate	Votes	%	±%
Conservative	Archibald Campbell	Unopposed		
Conservative hold				

General election 1852: Argyllshire
Party	Candidate	Votes	%	±%
Conservative	Archibald Campbell	Unopposed		
Registered electors		2,156		
Conservative hold				

General election 1857: Argyllshire
Party	Candidate	Votes	%	±%
Whig	Alexander Struthers Finlay	Unopposed		
Registered electors		2,256		
Whig gain from Conservative				

General election 1859: Argyllshire
Party	Candidate	Votes	%	±%
Liberal	Alexander Struthers Finlay	Unopposed		
Registered electors		2,294		
Liberal hold				

Back to Election results

=== Elections in the 1860s ===
General election 1865: Argyllshire
Party	Candidate	Votes	%	±%
Liberal	Alexander Struthers Finlay	Unopposed		
Registered electors		1,914		
Liberal hold				

Finlay resigned, causing a by-election.

By-election, 3 Mar 1868: Argyllshire
Party	Candidate	Votes	%	±%
Liberal	John Campbell	Unopposed		
Liberal hold				

General election 1868: Argyllshire
Party	Candidate	Votes	%	±%
Liberal	John Campbell	Unopposed		
Registered electors		2,870		
Liberal hold				

Back to Election results

=== Elections in the 1870s ===
General election 1874: Argyllshire
Party	Candidate	Votes	%	±%
Liberal	John Campbell	Unopposed		
Registered electors		3,018		
Liberal hold				

Campbell resigned after being appointed Governor General of Canada.

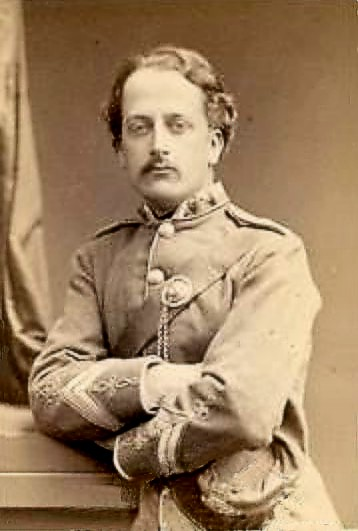
Lord Colin Campbell

By-election, 31 Aug 1878: Argyllshire
Party	Candidate	Votes	%	±%
Liberal	Colin Campbell	1,462	56.9	N/A
Conservative	John Malcolm	1,107	43.1	New
Majority		355	13.8	N/A
Turnout		2,569	82.0	N/A
Registered electors		3,133		
Liberal hold		Swing	N/A	

Back to Election results

=== Elections in the 1880s ===
General election 1880: Argyllshire
Party	Candidate	Votes	%	±%
Liberal	Colin Campbell	1,457	55.0	N/A
Conservative	John Malcolm	1,191	45.0	N/A
Majority		266	10.0	N/A
Turnout		2,648	80.3	N/A
Registered electors		3,299		
Liberal hold		Swing	N/A	

General election 1885: Argyllshire
Party	Candidate	Votes	%	±%
Independent Liberal (Crofters)	Donald Horne McFarlane	3,340	48.6	New
Independent Liberal	William Mackinnon	2,856	41.6	New
Liberal	John Stuart McCaig	670	9.8	−45.2
Majority		484	7.0	N/A
Turnout		6,866	68.6	−11.7
Registered electors		10,011		
Independent Liberal gain from Liberal		Swing	N/A	

General election 1886: Argyllshire
Party	Candidate	Votes	%	±%
Conservative	John Malcolm	3,658	54.6	New
Liberal (Crofters)	Donald Horne McFarlane	3,045	45.4	−3.2
Majority		613	9.2	N/A
Turnout		6,703	67.0	−1.6
Registered electors		10,011		
Conservative gain from Independent Liberal		Swing	N/A	

Back to Election results

=== Elections in the 1890s ===
General election 1892: Argyllshire
Party	Candidate	Votes	%	±%
Liberal (Crofters)	Donald Horne Macfarlane	3,666	50.6	+5.2
Conservative	John Malcolm	3,586	49.4	−5.2
Majority		80	1.2	N/A
Turnout		7,252	73.4	+6.4
Registered electors		9,874		
Liberal gain from Conservative		Swing	+5.2	

General election 1895: Argyllshire
Party	Candidate	Votes	%	±%
Conservative	Donald Nicol	3,970	50.9	+1.5
Liberal	Donald Horne Macfarlane	3,835	49.1	−1.5
Majority		135	1.8	N/A
Turnout		7,805	74.5	+1.1
Registered electors		10,471		
Conservative gain from Liberal		Swing	+1.5	

Back to Election results

=== Elections in the 1900s ===
General election 1900: Argyllshire
Party	Candidate	Votes	%	±%
Conservative	Donald Nicol	3,834	54.2	+3.3
Liberal	John Ainsworth	3,234	45.8	−3.3
Majority		600	8.4	+6.6
Turnout		7,068	67.9	−6.6
Registered electors		10,405		
Conservative hold		Swing	+3.3	

John Ainsworth

1903 Argyllshire by-election
Party	Candidate	Votes	%	±%
Liberal	John Ainsworth	4,326	61.2	+15.4
Conservative	C. Stewart	2,740	38.8	−15.4
Majority		1,586	22.4	N/A
Turnout		7,066	66.4	−1.5
Registered electors		10,643		
Liberal gain from Conservative		Swing	+15.4	

General election 1906: Argyllshire
Party	Candidate	Votes	%	±%
Liberal	John Ainsworth	4,507	59.9	+14.1
Conservative	George Hutchison	3,012	40.1	−14.1
Majority		1,495	19.8	N/A
Turnout		7,519	67.0	−0.9
Registered electors		11,216		
Liberal gain from Conservative		Swing	+14.1	

Back to Election results

=== Elections in the 1910s ===
General election January 1910: Argyllshire
Party	Candidate	Votes	%	±%
Liberal	John Ainsworth	4,443	55.1	−4.8
Conservative	George Hutchison	3,617	44.9	+4.8
Majority		826	10.2	−9.6
Turnout		8,060	73.1	+6.1
Registered electors		11,025		
Liberal hold		Swing	−4.8	

General election December 1910: Argyllshire
Party	Candidate	Votes	%	±%
Liberal	John Ainsworth	4,280	51.5	−3.6
Conservative	George Hutchison	4,023	48.5	+3.6
Majority		257	3.0	−7.2
Turnout		8,303	71.8	−1.3
Registered electors		11,572		
Liberal hold		Swing	−3.6	

General Election 1914–15:

Another General Election was required to take place before the end of 1915. The political parties had been making preparations for an election to take place and by July 1914, the following candidates had been selected;

- Liberal:
- Unionist: George Hutchison

General election 1918: Argyllshire
Party		Candidate	Votes	%	±%
C	National Liberal	William Sutherland	11,970	81.4	+29.9
	Highland Land League	Lauchlin MacNeill Weir	2,733	18.6	New
Majority			9,237	62.8	+59.8
Turnout			14,703	52.0	−29.8
	National Liberal gain from Liberal		Swing		
C indicates candidate endorsed by the coalition government.

Back to Election results

=== Elections in the 1920s ===
Sir W. Sutherland

1920 Argyll by-election
Party		Candidate	Votes	%	±%
C	National Liberal	William Sutherland	10,187	64.9	−16.5
	Labour	Malcolm MacCallum	5,498	35.1	New
Majority			4,689	29.8	−33.0
Turnout			15,685	50.2	−1.8
	National Liberal hold		Swing		
C indicates candidate endorsed by the coalition government.

General election 1922: Argyllshire
Party	Candidate	Votes	%	±%
National Liberal	William Sutherland	9,848	58.8	–22.6
Liberal	Henry Anderson Watt	6,897	41.2	New
Majority		2,591	15.6	−47.2
Turnout		16,745	51.8	−0.2
National Liberal hold		Swing	N/A	

General election 1923: Argyllshire
Party	Candidate	Votes	%	±%
Liberal	William Sutherland	9,020	52.7	−6.1
Unionist	Frederick Alexander Macquisten	8,100	47.3	New
Majority		920	5.4	N/A
Turnout		17,120	53.3	+1.5
Liberal hold		Swing	N/A	

General election 1924: Argyllshire
Party	Candidate	Votes	%	±%
Unionist	Frederick Alexander Macquisten	9,240	46.2	−1.1
Liberal	William Sutherland	6,211	31.1	−21.6
Labour	I.H. MacIver	4,532	22.7	New
Majority		3,029	15.1	+9.7
Turnout		19,983	62.7	+9.4
Unionist gain from Liberal		Swing		

General election 1929: Argyllshire
Party	Candidate	Votes	%	±%
Unionist	Frederick Alexander Macquisten	11,108	44.1	−2.1
Liberal	Basil Murray	8,089	32.1	+1.0
Labour	John L. Kinloch	6,001	23.8	+1.1
Majority		3,019	12.0	−3.1
Turnout		25,198	62.7	0.0
Unionist hold		Swing	−1.6	

Back to Election results

=== Elections in the 1930s ===
General election 1931: Argyllshire
Party	Candidate	Votes	%	±%
Unionist	Frederick Alexander Macquisten	Unopposed		
Unionist hold				

General election 1935: Argyllshire
Party	Candidate	Votes	%	±%
Unionist	Frederick Alexander Macquisten	13,260	53.6	N/A
Liberal	Basil Murray	11,486	46.4	New
Majority		1,774	7.2	N/A
Turnout		24,746	56.6	N/A
Unionist hold		Swing	N/A	

Back to Election results

=== Elections in the 1940s ===
1940 Argyllshire by-election
Party	Candidate	Votes	%	±%
Unionist	Duncan McCallum	12,317	62.8	+9.2
SNP	William Power	7,308	37.2	New
Majority		5,009	25.5	+17.3
Turnout		19,625	47.9	−8.7
Unionist hold		Swing		

General election 1945: Argyllshire
Party	Candidate	Votes	%	±%
Unionist	Duncan McCallum	15,791	56.6	+3.0
Labour	A. MacNeill Weir	8,889	31.9	New
Liberal	John Bannerman	3,228	11.6	−34.8
Majority		6,902	24.7	+17.5
Turnout		27,908	63.9	+7.3
Unionist hold		Swing		

Back to Election results

=== Elections in the 1950s ===
General election 1950: Argyll
Party	Candidate	Votes	%	±%
Unionist	Duncan McCallum	19,259	66.5	+9.9
Labour	I. Nicholson	9,215	31.8	−0.1
Scottish Home Rule	M S McP Holt	490	1.7	New
Majority		10,044	34.7	+10.0
Turnout		28,964	75.1	+11.2
Unionist hold		Swing		

General election 1951: Argyll
Party	Candidate	Votes	%	±%
Unionist	Duncan McCallum	21,191	68.1	+1.6
Labour	Robert M. Young	9,925	31.9	+0.1
Majority		11,266	36.2	+1.5
Turnout		28,210	67.1	−8.0
Unionist hold		Swing		

General election 1955: Argyll
Party	Candidate	Votes	%	±%
Unionist	Duncan McCallum	19,119	67.8	−0.3
Labour	Robert M. Young	9,091	32.2	+0.3
Majority		10,028	35.6	−0.6
Turnout		28,210	66.9	−0.2
Unionist hold		Swing	−0.3	

1958 Argyll by-election
Party	Candidate	Votes	%	±%
Unionist	Michael Noble	12,541	46.8	−21.0
Liberal	William D. McKean	7,375	27.5	New
Labour	Robert M. Young	6,884	25.7	−6.5
Majority		5,166	19.3	−16.3
Turnout		26,800		
Unionist hold		Swing		

General election 1959: Argyll
Party	Candidate	Votes	%	±%
Unionist	Michael Noble	16,599	58.4	−9.4
Labour	D. Nisbet	7,356	25.9	−6.3
Liberal	Gerard Noel	4,469	15.7	New
Majority		9,243	32.5	−3.1
Turnout		28,424	71.0	+4.1
Unionist hold		Swing		

Back to Election results

=== Elections in the 1960s ===
General election 1964: Argyll
Party	Candidate	Votes	%	±%
Unionist	Michael Noble	13,277	47.2	−11.2
Labour	Duncan L. MacMillan	8,120	28.9	+3.0
Liberal	John MacKay	6,707	23.9	+8.2
Majority		5,157	18.4	−14.1
Turnout		28,104	70.3	−0.7
Unionist hold		Swing		

General election 1966: Argyll
Party	Candidate	Votes	%	±%
Conservative	Michael Noble	12,178	43.2	−4.0
Labour	John McFadden	8,486	30.1	+1.2
Liberal	John MacKay	7,512	26.7	+2.8
Majority		3,692	13.1	−5.3
Turnout		28,176	72.3	+2.0
Conservative hold		Swing		

Back to Election results

=== Elections in the 1970s ===
General election 1970: Argyll
Party	Candidate	Votes	%	±%
Conservative	Michael Noble	13,521	44.8	+1.6
SNP	Iain MacCormick	9,039	29.9	New
Labour	John McFadden	7,633	25.3	−4.8
Majority		4,482	14.9	+1.8
Turnout		30,193	73.9	+1.6
Conservative hold		Swing		

General election February 1974: Argyll
Party	Candidate	Votes	%	±%
SNP	Iain MacCormick	15,646	48.9	+19.0
Conservative	Peter Craft Hutchison	12,358	38.6	−6.2
Labour	M.J.N. MacGregor	4,027	12.6	−12.7
Majority		3,288	10.3	N/A
Turnout		32,031	77.3	+3.4
SNP gain from Conservative		Swing	+12.6	

General election October 1974: Argyll
Party	Candidate	Votes	%	±%
SNP	Iain MacCormick	14,967	49.7	+0.8
Conservative	John MacKay	11,036	36.7	−1.9
Labour	M.J.N. MacGregor	4,103	13.6	+1.0
Majority		3,931	13.0	+1.7
Turnout		30,106	72.0	−5.3
SNP hold		Swing	+1.4	

General election 1979: Argyll
Party	Candidate	Votes	%	±%
Conservative	John MacKay	12,191	36.8	+0.1
SNP	Iain MacCormick	10,545	31.8	−17.9
Labour	M.J.N. MacGregor	5,283	16.0	+2.4
Liberal	Ray Michie	5,113	15.4	New
Majority		1,646	5.0	N/A
Turnout		33,132	76.1	+4.1
Conservative gain from SNP		Swing	+9.0	

Back to Top

== See also ==
- 1920 Argyll by-election
