= 1954 Inverness by-election =

UK parliamentary by-election

The 1954 Inverness by-election was a by-election held on 21 December 1954 for the British House of Commons constituency of Inverness.

The by-election was caused by the resignation of the sitting Unionist Member of Parliament (MP) Lord Malcolm Douglas-Hamilton, by his application for the Chiltern Hundreds. Douglas-Hamilton had held the seat since 1950.

The result was a victory for the Unionist candidate Neil McLean. McLean held the seat until 1964 when he lost to the Liberal Russell Johnston.

== The constituency ==
In 1954 the constituency of Inverness was one of the largest Parliamentary constituencies in Britain spread across 4,000 square miles (10,000 km^{2}) of Scottish Highland, from the county town of Inverness to the west coast of Scotland and included the Isle of Skye and some nearby islands. More than half the electorate lived in the town of Inverness itself however.

== Candidates ==
The Tories chose as their representative the 36-year-old, Eton and Sandhurst educated Lieutenant Colonel Neil McLean who had lived in the Highlands as a child. McLean had the advantage of knowing that Douglas-Hamilton was going to resign and had moved to the constituency in anticipation of the by-election. He had been installed as the prospective candidate for about 18 months, using the time to get to know the area well and establish a rapport with the electorate. Labour selected Dundee engine driver and trade union official, William Paterson, aged 44. The former Labour candidate at the 1951 general election, Alexander Macnair had indicated he wished to stand again but the local Labour Party preferred a new man. Macnair then said he might put up as an Independent Labour candidate but did not do so in the end. The Liberals, who had not fought the seat at the previous general election in 1951 settled on John Bannerman a Gaelic speaking farmer and former Scotland Rugby international, who had been Liberal candidate for Argyll at the general elections of 1945 and 1950.

== Election issues ==
The first political controversy to emerge in relation to Inverness was the timing of the by-election itself. Labour in particular objected to what they called 'the sharp practice' of moving the by-election writ by the Tories when they did, based on the deliberate shortening of campaign time this would mean for opposition candidates, especially in a geographically large and electorally scattered constituency and at a difficult time of year - the dead of winter and just before Christmas. According to one account in a national newspaper the topical issues were the problems of depopulation, transport and midges. However the Liberal candidate, John Bannerman, based his campaign on support for Home Rule for Scotland and an increase in old age pensions. Paterson received a letter of support from former prime minister Clement Attlee reminding voters that the Labour Party in office had developed hydro-electric power and a great programme of afforestation in the Highlands.

== Result ==
Inverness by-election, 1954: Inverness
Party	Candidate	Votes	%	±%
Unionist	Neil McLean	10,329	41.4	−23.1
Liberal	John Bannerman	8,998	36.0	New
Labour	William Paterson	5,642	22.6	−12.9
Majority		1,331	5.4	−23.7
Turnout		24,959	49.2	−20.1
Unionist hold		Swing		

== Impact ==
The by-election result caused little stir at the time, although the Liberals were clearly pleased with their performance given they had not fought the seat in 1951 and had pushed Labour into third place. It does however seem that Inverness served as a portent of what was to come in Scotland over the next few general elections. One historian has commented that the "...Conservative Party was to suffer in the following decades from the effects of growing support for home rule, later translated into support for the Scottish National Party and a rise in support for the Liberals and Labour." Despite the opinion in The Times newspaper that ‘...it is possible to argue that if the Liberals could not recover Inverness this time, when all the circumstances and candidate favoured them, their best days there seem to be over for good' the Inverness result also pre-figured the Liberal revival of the late 1950s and 1960s when under the leadership of Jo Grimond the party won its first by-election victory since 1929 at Torrington in 1958 and more spectacularly at Orpington in 1962. As already noted, the Liberals best days in Inverness were hardly behind them as they won the seat in 1964 and the Liberal Democrats‘ Danny Alexander held the equivalent constituency until the 2015 general election.

== See also ==
- 1922 Inverness by-election
- Inverness constituency
- Lists of United Kingdom by-elections
- Murdoch Macdonald
