= Tara (Cairo villa) =

Former squat in Cairo, Egypt

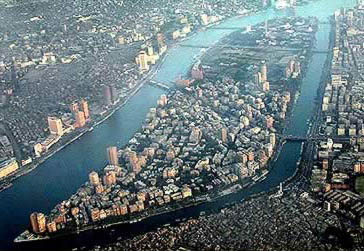
- Gezira Island from the north. Sharia Abou el Feda runs along the shore from the tip of the island (bottom left) to the bridge (mid right).
- Interactive map of the "Tara" area

General information
- Type: Villa
- Location: Sharia Abou el Feda; Zamalek District; Gezira Island, Cairo, Egypt
- Coordinates: 30°4′15″N 31°13′11″E

Tara was the given and temporary name of an illegally commandeered villa (a squat in more recent terms) on Gezira Island, Cairo, made notorious by its occupants during World War II. The group of Special Operations Executive agents who lived there, together with Countess Zofia (Sophie) Tarnowska, turned the villa into a centre of high life excess.

== History ==
The villa was discovered in 1943 by Captain W. Stanley Moss, a British officer in the Special Operations Executive. It was spacious and had a large ballroom with parquet floors, which could accommodate four or five people. Moss chose to occupy the villa rather than live in the SOE hostel, "Hangover Hall". He moved in alone at first, then bought his Alsatian puppy, Pixie. Xan Fielding, who had worked in Crete, joined him. The next occupant to arrive was Countess Zofia (Sophie) Tarnowska, a refugee from Poland in 1939, followed by Arnold Breene of SOE HQ. Finally, Patrick Leigh Fermor, an SOE officer who had spent the previous nine months in Crete, joined the household.

The villa's new occupants called it Tara after the Hill of Tara in Ireland.

Sophie Tarnowska and two other women had been asked to share the house with the SOE agents, but only she went through with it, after the men pleaded with her not to let them down. She moved in with her few possessions (a bathing costume, an evening gown, a uniform and two pet mongooses), and had her reputation in the all-male household protected by a fictitious chaperone, "Madame Khayatt", who suffered from "distressingly poor health" and was always indisposed when visitors asked after her.

They were later joined by SOE agents "Billy" McLean, David Smiley returning from Albania ("David deciding that it would be cheaper to live in Tara than to come in every day and be tapped by the cook or Abdul for money to pay for meals"), and Rowland Winn, also active in Albania.

Tara became the most exciting place in the city, the centre of high-spirited entertaining of diplomats, officers, writers, lecturers, war correspondents, and Coptic and Levantine party-goers. The residents adopted nicknames: "Princess Dneiper-Petrovsk" (Sophie Tarnowska) and the young buccaneers, "Sir Eustace Rapier" (Billy McLean), "the Marquis of Whipstock" (David Smiley), "the Hon. Rupert Sabretache" (Rowland Winn), "Lord Hughe Devildrive" (Xan Fielding), "Lord Pintpot" (Arnold Breene), "Lord Rakehell" (Patrick Leigh Fermor) and "Mr Jack Jargon" (W. Stanley Moss).

There followed lots of parties – the night we had the bullfight, the night we let some other people throw a party in Tara and we locked ourselves up in Kitten's (Tarnowska's) bedroom – the night we broke 19 windows and Andrew Tarnowski picked up the biggest bowl of flowers and threw it through the biggest window – Peter Wilkinson moving in, Paddy's return from Haifa, Billy arriving to take the spare room – house full of Abyssinian and Albanian and every other kind of loot – continuous round of gaiety – this was Tara at its happiest and most popular – everyone seemed to love us and not one, but all of us, were asked everywhere and did everything. Paddy setting things on fire with incredible regularity – and never let me forget Arnold, on the night of the windows, sitting on the roof hurling things at the neighbour – or Kitten breaking her finger doing a tummy-dance!

Tarnowska drew on memories of liqueur-making on her father's estates to produce the party drinks, adding plums, apricots, and peaches to raw alcohol (as a substitute for vodka) purchased from the local garage, in the bath. The results were disappointing as, rather than being left to mature for three weeks, the mixture was drunk after three days.

At the end of their first ball, Leigh Fermor fell asleep on a sofa which ignited, before it was thrown burning into the garden below. Over the course of the winter of 1943, a piano was borrowed from the Egyptian Officers' Club, light bulbs were shot out. On one occasion, King Farouk arrived at the villa with a crate of champagne.

In the winter of 1944 the rightful owner of the villa secured the occupants' eviction on the grounds that it had not been let to a "Princess Dneiper-Petrovsk" et al., as stated on the villa's name plate, and the Tara household had to leave the rather battered building and move into a flat.
