= John Bannerman, Baron Bannerman of Kildonan =

Scotland international rugby union player, politician & farmer

The Right Honourable The Lord Bannerman of Kildonan

Personal details
- Born: John MacDonald Bannerman, 1 September 1901 Glasgow, Scotland
- Died: 10 May 1969 (aged 67) Tidworth, Hampshire, England
- Party: Liberal
- Spouse: Ray Mundell
- Relatives: Shade Munro, John Bannerman, Ray Michie
- Education: Shawlands Academy, Glasgow High School, University of Glasgow; Balliol College, Oxford; Cornell University
- Occupation: Farmer, politician/life peer
- Nickname(s): J.M., Iain mac Iain

Rugby union career
- Position: Forward
Amateur team(s)
Years	Team	Apps	(Points)
- Glasgow HSFP
–	Glasgow University		
–	Oxford University		
Provincial / State sides
Years	Team	Apps	(Points)
1922	Glasgow District		
International career
Years	Team	Apps	(Points)
1921–1929	Scotland	37	(6)

68th President of the Scottish Rugby Union
- In office 1954–1955
- Preceded by: Malcolm Allan
- Succeeded by: Robert Meldrum

John MacDonald Bannerman, Baron Bannerman of Kildonan OBE (1 September 1901 – 10 May 1969; Scottish Gaelic: Iain mac Iain Mac-a'-Bhrataich) was a Scottish farmer, rugby union internationalist and Liberal politician.

== Family and education ==
Born in Glasgow in 1901, Bannerman was the son of John Roderick Bannerman, a Post Office employee originally from the Hebridean island of South Uist but living in Glasgow at the time of his son's birth; he is remembered for writing the popular Scottish folk song "Mairi's Wedding". John Bannerman always treasured his Highland heritage and was a native Gaelic speaker. Bannerman was educated at Shawlands Academy and Glasgow High School. He graduated from the University of Glasgow with a Bachelor of Science and then went on to Balliol College, Oxford and later to Cornell University in the United States.

In 1931 he married Ray Mundell and they had two sons and two daughters. One of their daughters was the Liberal Democrat MP, Ray Michie (later Baroness Michie of Gallanach). The historian John Bannerman was his son, and Donald Shade Munro, the rugby player and coach was his grandson.

== Rugby union ==
=== School and College Rugby ===
Bannerman started playing rugby union while at school, and between 1919 and 1920, he was captain of Glasgow High School's 1st XV.

Bannerman was an accomplished sportsman winning a "rugby blue" at Oxford

=== Provincial career ===
He played for Glasgow District in the 1922 inter-city match.

=== International career ===
He won 37 caps for Scotland, playing in all that country's internationals between 1921 and 1929 and was Scotland's most capped player until 1962 when Hugh McLeod surpassed his total. He played in Scotland's first "grand slam" winning team in 1925, securing this achievement by beating England in the opening match of the new Murrayfield Stadium. In 1926 he played in the Scotland team that beat England at Twickenham and France in Paris, a feat that no Scottish team would repeat until 2021, 95 years later. The 1926 victory was the first game that England had lost at Twickenham to a "5 Nations" opponent. During the years Bannerman played international rugby Scotland won the championship four times, outright in 1925 and 1929 and shared with Ireland in 1926 and 1927 In the first year of his international career Bannerman played at prop; thereafter he played at lock. He captained Scotland on four occasions in 1928 and 29

He went on to become Glasgow HSFP's most capped player.

John Bannerman's International Record
Opponent	Played	won	Lost	Drawn
England	9	4	5	0
Ireland	9	5	4	0
Wales	9	5	3	1
France	9	6	2	1
New South Wales.	1	1	0	0

=== Administrative career ===
In 1954–55, Bannerman served as President of the Scottish Rugby Union.

== Career ==
In 1930, Bannerman was appointed as a farm manager on land owned by the Duke of Montrose. In 1952 Bannerman left the Montrose estate to become a farmer in his own interests and also that year became an Officer of the Order of the British Empire for services to the Festival of Britain.

== Politics ==
Previously a member of the Scottish Party, Bannerman became active in Liberal politics from the 1930s. He was particularly interested in the problems of depopulation and unemployment for ordinary people in the Scottish Highlands and islands. From 1942 to 1957 he was a Forestry Commissioner. In 1938 he was adopted as prospective Liberal parliamentary candidate for Argyll. When the seat fell vacant in 1940 it was mooted that Bannerman might run as a Liberal National but the negotiations with the Conservatives broke down robbing him of his best chance of entering the House of Commons. He contested Argyll unsuccessfully in the 1945 general election and Inverness in 1950. But in 1954 he was the candidate in an extraordinary by-election at Inverness which some historians have seen as a true turning point in Liberal fortunes in Scotland and perhaps the United Kingdom. From a position where there had been no Liberal candidate in the 1951 election, Bannerman jumped into second place over Labour, coming just 1331 votes behind the Tory winner. This was the best Liberal by-election performance since the war. At the general election of 1955, Bannerman came even closer, losing by just 966 votes. Although his vote share declined in the 1959 general election, the ground had been laid for a successful attack on the seat in the 1964 general election by Russell Johnston, who held the seat until he retired from the Commons in 1997.

Bannerman was chairman of the Scottish Liberal Party from 1954 to 1964 and Rector of Aberdeen University in 1957. He made other attempts to enter the Commons, including giving Labour a close run at the Paisley by-election of 1961, registering 41.3% of the vote in a seat where there had been no Liberal candidate at the 1959 general election. He tried again without success at Paisley at the 1964 general election but in December 1967 he was made Baron Bannerman of Kildonan, of Kildonan in the County of Sutherland, and so finally entered Parliament.

=== Life peerage ===
Bannerman was one of three Liberals to be made life peers in 1967; the others were Tim Beaumont and John Foot. Their appointments were attacked by the Young Liberals as undemocratic. One particular critic was Tony Greaves, then editor of the Young Liberal publication Gunfire, who argued that as the Liberal Party was in favour of a new social and political order, it was quite wrong to participate in the most pathetic feature of the existing order, the House of Lords. (Greaves would become Baron Greaves of Pendle in 2000).

In his maiden speech in the Lords, Bannerman took up the Scottish cause, referring to the anger of Hamilton where the Scottish National Party had just won a parliamentary by-election; and warning it was the anger of two centuries in which the Scots had been a "sleeping partner" in the United Kingdom political scene.

== Gaelic culture ==
In 1922 he won the prestigious gold medal for solo singing at the Royal National Mòd in Fort William. He was President of An Comunn Gàidhealach, the national Gaelic Society, a position previously held by his father, from 1949 to 1954.

== Death ==
He died in Tidworth, Hampshire, on 10 May 1969 aged 67.

Party political offices
Preceded by C. H. Johnston	Chairman of the Scottish Liberal Party; 1956–1964	Succeeded by George Mackie
Preceded by Archibald Sinclair	President of the Scottish Liberal Party with Archibald Sinclair 1963–1965; Andrew Murray 1965–1967; 1963–1969	Succeeded by ?
Academic offices
Preceded by Sir Rhoderick McGrigor	Rector of the University of Aberdeen; 1957–1960	Succeeded by Peter Scott
