= Lord Malcolm Douglas-Hamilton =

British politician (1909–1964)

Lord Malcolm Douglas-Hamilton OBE, DFC

Member of Parliament for Inverness
- In office 23 February 1950 – 2 December 1954
- Preceded by: Murdoch Macdonald
- Succeeded by: Billy McLean

Personal details
- Born: 12 November 1909 Dungavel House, Lanarkshire, Scotland
- Died: 21 July 1964 (aged 54) Cameroon
- Cause of death: Aeroplane crash
- Party: Unionist
- Spouses: Pamela Bowes-Lyon (m. 1931; div. 1952) Natalie Scarritt Wales (m. 1953)
- Children: 4
- Parent(s): Alfred Douglas-Hamilton; Nina Mary Benita Poore
- Education: Eton College

Military service
- Allegiance: United Kingdom
- Branch/service: Royal Air Force
- Rank: Wing Commander
- Commands: RAF Winkleigh; No. 540 Squadron RAF
- Battles/wars: Second World War
- Awards: Officer of the Order of the British Empire; Distinguished Flying Cross

Wing Commander Lord Malcolm Avondale Douglas-Hamilton, OBE, DFC (12 November 1909 – 21 July 1964) was a Scottish aristocrat, aviator and politician.

He also drove in the 1935 24 Hours of Le Mans, driving an Aston Martin Ulster owned by principal driver Peter Donkin; they finished 11th.

== Marriage and family ==
Douglas-Hamilton was third son of Alfred Douglas-Hamilton, 13th Duke of Hamilton, and Nina Poore. He was educated at Eton College and at the RAF College Cranwell.

Douglas-Hamilton married twice: firstly in 1931 to Pamela Bowes-Lyon, a granddaughter of the 13th Earl of Strathmore and Kinghorne and cousin to Queen Elizabeth the Queen Mother. They had four children. Their elder son, Alasdair, wrote a biography of his father, Lord of the Skies. Following their divorce, Douglas-Hamilton married in 1953 Natalie Scarritt Paine née Wales (1909-2013), an American who had organised the Bundles for Britain campaign during the Second World War, for which she was awarded the CBE. (Note: Enid Scarritt Wales had married first Kenelm Winslow, and second Edward Latham, both of whom she divorced. It was as Natalie Latham that she first made contact with Winston Churchill. Her third marriage was to Edward Bragg Paine, from whom she was widowed in 1951.)

After his second marriage, Douglas-Hamilton emigrated to the United States, where he became extremely active in fostering relations between Scotland and Americans of Scottish descent. He considered the United States to be his adopted country. He founded, along with Lady Malcolm, the American Scottish Foundation, which after the Saint Andrews Society is the oldest American organization devoted to US/Scottish relations in existence. The organization was responsible for establishment of Scotland House, and the Scottish Ball, an annual charitable dinner devoted to raising money to support the American Scottish cause.

After Lord Malcolm Douglas came to the U.S., he established an American branch of a racial eugenics group headquartered in Scotland. The oil billionaire Hunt brothers and Senator Jesse Helms are members of this group. It was headed by Robert Gayre, who published the racialist Mankind Quarterly until Roger Pearson took it over in 1978.

== Career in aviation ==
Douglas-Hamilton served with the Royal Air Force (RAF) from 1929 to 1932, then worked in civil aviation until the outbreak of the Second World War.

Recently disclosed documents from MI5 show, that, on 1 August 1936, Douglas-Hamilton flew a de Havilland plane to Spain, that he delivered to pro-Franco nationalists. Another plane was flown the next day by Dick Seaman. Only two weeks earlier, General Franco was flown in a de Havilland from the Canary Islands to Morocco and onwards to Spain, helped by two other Britons, Hugh Pollard and Cecil Bebb.

During the Second World War Douglas-Hamilton again served with the RAF, becoming commander of RAF Winkleigh on 29 March 1944. He was appointed an Officer of the Order of the British Empire in 1943 and awarded the Distinguished Flying Cross in 1944. He was Air Training Corps Commandant for Scotland from 1945 to 1946. His elder brother, the Marquess of Douglas and Clydesdale, later 14th Duke of Hamilton and 11th Duke of Brandon, had also been active in the RAF and ATC.

Douglas-Hamilton continued his love of flying, starting his own charter flying company in the early 1960s, and with his son Niall traversed remote parts of the globe. It was on one such trip through Cameroon in 1964 that Douglas-Hamilton, aged 54, went missing with his son Niall and a passenger, in the heavy equatorial mountainous jungle of Cameroon. Following an exhaustive manhunt by Douglas-Hamilton's family, including assistance from the Rockefeller company United Fruit, his remains were located in the jungle. Neither Niall Douglas-Hamilton nor the passenger were ever located.

== Positions held ==
Douglas-Hamilton was the Unionist Member of Parliament for Inverness from 1950 to 1954.

Douglas-Hamilton held a number of appointments, including as a Governor of Gordonstoun School and as a member of the Royal Company of Archers.

== See also ==
- George Nigel Douglas-Hamilton, 10th Earl of Selkirk
- Lord David Douglas-Hamilton
- Duke of Hamilton

== Sources ==
- Charles Mosley, ed., Burke's Peerage and Baronetage, 106th edition, 2 vols. (Crans, Switzerland: Burke's Peerage (Genealogical Books) Ltd, 1999), volume 1, page 1286

Parliament of the United Kingdom
Preceded by Sir Murdoch Macdonald	Member of Parliament for Inverness; 1950–1954	Succeeded by Neil McLean
