= Xan Fielding =

British Army officer

Major Xan Fielding DSO
- Born: Alexander Percival Wallace; 26 November 1918; Ootacamund, British India
- Died: 19 August 1991 (aged 72); Paris, France
- Military career
- Allegiance: United Kingdom
- Branch: British Army
- Service years: 1940 – 1946
- Rank: Major
- Service number: 159770
- Units: Cyprus Regiment; Special Operations Executive
- Conflicts: World War II
- Awards: Distinguished Service Order (UK); Croix de Guerre (France); Commemorative Medal for National Resistance, 1941–1945 (Greece)
- Other work: Author, translator

Alexander Wallace Fielding DSO (26 November 1918 – 19 August 1991), known as Xan Fielding, was a British author, translator, journalist and traveller, who served as a Special Operations Executive (SOE) agent in Crete, France and East Asia during World War II. The purpose of SOE was to conduct espionage, sabotage and reconnaissance in occupied Europe and Asia against the Axis powers, especially Nazi Germany.

== Biography ==
=== Early life ===
Fielding was born in Ootacamund, India, where his father, Alexander James Lumsden Wallace, served in the Indian Army, as a major in the 52nd Sikhs (Frontier Force). Fielding's mother Mary Gertrude (née Feilmann) died soon after his birth, on 13 December 1918, and he was largely brought up in Nice, France, by his maternal grandparents who adopted the name Fielding. For the first eight years of his life, he thought his grandparents were his parents and his seven aunts and uncles were his older siblings. He was educated at Charterhouse School and then studied briefly at the Universities of Bonn, Munich and Freiburg in Germany. In the late 1930s, Fielding moved to Cyprus, where he worked as a sub-editor on The Cyprus Times and ran a bar.

The actress Vivien Leigh was his first cousin once removed, as her mother Gertrude was the youngest sister of Fielding's maternal grandmother. The actor Gerald Fielding was his uncle and took care of him after the death of his grandparents.

=== Crete ===
Following the fall of France, Fielding joined the British Army, and was commissioned into the Cyprus Regiment as a second lieutenant on 1 September 1940. After the fall of Crete in May 1941, he joined the Special Operations Executive, and was eventually landed in Crete with a supply of weapons and explosives by the submarine Torbay, under Commander Anthony Miers. Fielding teamed up with Patrick Leigh Fermor, and built an intelligence gathering network which provided detailed information on the movement of Axis troops, shipping, and air transport.

He arranged for the transportation to Egypt of hundreds of Allied soldiers left behind after the evacuation, and now being hidden by the Cretans. After six months Fielding returned to Cairo, and was awarded the Distinguished Service Order on 15 October 1942.

Fielding finally returned to Crete with Arthur Reade in November 1942. In November 1943 he successfully concluded a pact between the two rival groups of andartes, the communist-led EAM-ELAS and the EOK, the national organisation of Crete. He was then relieved by Dennis Ciclitira. In Cairo, he became a member of the Tara household created by Bill Stanley Moss.

=== France ===
In early 1944 Fielding volunteered to join the French section of SOE, and was parachuted into the south of France in mid-1944, where he was met by two other SOE agents: Francis Cammaerts (codename "Roger") and Christine Granville (codename "Pauline") of the "Jockey" network.

On 13 August 1944, two days before the Allied landings in southern France, Fielding, Cammaerts and French agent Christian Sorensen were stopped at a roadblock near Digne. An irregularity in Fielding's papers, plus the large amount of cash he and Cammaerts were carrying, aroused suspicion and they were arrested. Granville soon arrived at Digne prison posing as Cammaerts' wife and, using a mixture of bribery and threats, persuaded the Germans to release them. As a result, the men were led out of prison expecting to be shot, and were astonished to be met by Granville, waiting for them with a car.

=== Post-war ===
Before the war in Europe ended Fielding briefly returned to Crete; he was one of the first Allied officers to enter liberated Athens. He served in the Far East for a few months until the end of the war, and visited Tibet. He then spent six months in Germany serving with the Special Intelligence Service, before serving as a United Nations observer in the Balkans in 1946.

In 1948 he met Daphne Thynne, the wife of Henry Thynne, 6th Marquess of Bath. After her divorce, they were married in 1953 and lived in Cornwall, Morocco, Portugal and Uzès.

In 1956 Fielding was hired by Michael Powell to act as technical adviser for the filming of Bill Stanley Moss's book Ill Met by Moonlight – the story of Leigh Fermor's and Moss's abduction of General Kreipe, the German commander in Crete. He wrote a number of books; including The Stronghold, an account of SOE's Cretan operations, and a memoir of his own wartime experiences Hide and Seek (which he dedicated to Christine Granville). In 2014 Folio republished Hide and Seek with an introduction by Granville's biographer Clare Mulley. He provided the English translations for many of the works of the French novelist Pierre Boulle, including his best-known books Le Pont de la rivière Kwaï (The Bridge over the River Kwai) and La Planète des singes (Planet of the Apes). He translated several books by Jean Lartéguy, as well as works by Gabriel Chevallier, Pierre Schoendoerffer and Jean Hougron. Fielding also collaborated with Patrick Leigh Fermor in a translation from Greek of George Psychoundakis' book The Cretan Runner

His marriage to Lady Daphne was dissolved in 1978. He remarried, to Agnes, daughter of Admiral John H. Magruder of the U.S. Navy and the widow of the artist Arshile Gorky.

=== Death ===
Xan Fielding died in Paris on 19 August 1991, aged 72.

== Publications ==
- The Stronghold: An Account of the Four Seasons in the White Mountains of Crete (1953)
- Hide and Seek: The Story of a War-time Agent (1954)
- Corsair Country: The Diary of a Journey along the Barbary Coast (1958)
- The Money Spinner: Monte Carlo and its Fabled Casino (1977)
- Best of Friends: The Brenan - Partridge Letters (1986), editor
- One Man in His Time: The Life of Lieutenant-Colonel N.L.D. ("Billy") McLean DSO (1990)
- Images of Spain (1991)
- Aeolus Displayed (1992)
- A Hideous Disguise (1994)

== See also ==
- Sophie Moss
- Dudley Perkins
- Cretan resistance
