= Clara B. Spence =

Educator, women's and civil rights advocate, adoption pioneer

- Born: 1859; Albany, New York, US
- Died: 1923 (aged 63–64); New York City, US
- Education: Boston University; University of London
- Occupation: educator
- Children: 4

Clara B. Spence (1859–1923) was an American educator, women's and civil rights advocate, adoption pioneer and civic leader.

== Background and career ==
Born in Albany, New York, in 1859 Spence came from a middle-class family. She got a good education and a degree from Boston University in Oratory 1879. She studied Shakespeare in London University and came back to New York City to work as an actor in the Madison Square Theatre. However, when her mother died in 1883, Spence changed her focus from acting to education.

She founded the Spence School for girls in East 91st Street in New York City, where she served as Headmistress for 31 years. In 1892 this included a nursery for abandoned babies. She became known as an innovative educator and was on many boards in the city including the American Museum of Natural History, Barnard College, the Oratorio Society and the Metropolitan Museum of Art. One of the teachers she hired for the school was Isadora Duncan. Edith Wharton gave lectures as did Helen Keller, with Anne Sullivan. One of the Alumni, Ruth Draper, was a close friend and returned to give talks at the school. Other speakers included Booker T. Washington and Aldous Huxley.

== Personal life ==
As an educated woman of her day it was not entirely uncommon for her not to marry. In the last two decades of the 19th century 50% of college educated women in the United States did not marry. In fact she found a like-minded woman with whom she shared the rest of her life. Together they adopted children, making them one of the first same sex adoption families. Her partner was Charlotte S. Baker and together they ran the school that Spence founded in 1892, The Spence School. In winter they lived with their children in an apartment at the school and in summer they moved to The Willows in Maine. The children were adopted through an adoption agency that Spence founded from the nursery that started the school, now called Spence-Chapin Services to Families and Children. She pioneered the idea of bringing children from other countries, in this case Great Britain, to the United States for adoption. Her own children were adopted in 1909, 1911, 1914 and 1915. Each of the two women adopted 2 children, a boy and a girl each. This personal investment in adoption paved the way for the modern idea of the children being part of the family and not cheap labour to be used. The women were supporters of the suffrage movement. Spence marched with Harriot Stanton Blatch in the Fifth Avenue march for equality in 1913.

Spence died in the summer of 1923. Her funeral was on 22 November 1923.
