= Inverness-shire (UK Parliament constituency) =

Parliamentary constituency in the United Kingdom, 1801–1918

- Former county constituency for the House of Commons

1708–1918
- Seats: One
- Replaced by: Western Isles; Inverness

Inverness-shire was a county constituency of the House of Commons of the Parliament of Great Britain from 1708 to 1801 and of the Parliament of the United Kingdom from 1801 until 1918.

There was also a burgh constituency called Inverness Burghs, 1708 to 1918, and a county constituency called Inverness, 1918 to 1983.

== Creation ==
The British parliamentary constituency was created in 1708 following the Acts of Union, 1707 and replaced the former Parliament of Scotland shire constituency of Inverness-shire.

== History ==
The constituency elected one Member of Parliament (MP) by the first past the post system until the seat was abolished in 1918.

== Boundaries ==
The Inverness-shire Member of Parliament (MP) represented, nominally, the county of Inverness minus the Inverness parliamentary burgh, which was represented as a component of Inverness District of Burghs. However, by 1892 the boundaries of the county had been redefined for all purposes except parliamentary representation, and it had become a local government area, under the Local Government (Scotland) Act 1889. 26 years were to elapse before a review of constituency boundaries took account of new local government boundaries. Results of the review were implemented under the Representation of the People Act 1918.

In 1918, the constituency was largely replaced by two new county constituencies. The Western Isles constituency was created to cover Outer Hebridean areas of the county of Inverness, as well as part of the county of Ross and Cromarty. The Inverness constituency was created to cover the rest of the county of Inverness, including the parliamentary burgh.

== Members of Parliament ==
Elected	Member	Party
1708	Alexander Grant	
1710	Alexander MacKenzie	
1715	John Forbes	
1722	Sir James Grant, Bt.	Whig
1741	Norman Macleod, (1705–1772)	
1754	Pryse Campbell	Whig
1761	Simon Fraser	
1782 by-election	Archibald Campbell Fraser	
1784	Lord William Gordon	
1790	Norman Macleod, (1754–1801)	Pittite/Tory
1791	Norman Macleod, (1754–1801)	Foxite Whig
1796	John Simon Frederick Fraser	Pittite/Tory
1802	Charles Grant (senior)	Pittite/Tory
1818	Rt Hon. Charles Grant, later Baron Glenelg	Tory/Canningite
1828 by-election	Rt Hon. Charles Grant, later Baron Glenelg	Whig
1835 by-election	Alexander William Chisholm	Conservative
1838 by-election	Francis William Grant	Conservative
1840 by-election	Henry James Baillie	Conservative
1868	Donald Cameron	Conservative
1885	Charles Fraser-Mackintosh	Independent Liberal/Crofters'
1886 change	Charles Fraser-Mackintosh	Liberal Unionist /Crofters' Party
1892	Donald MacGregor	Liberal/Crofters' Party
1895	James Evan Bruce Baillie	Conservative
1900	Sir John Dewar, Bt., later Baron Forteviot	Liberal
1917 by-election	Thomas Brash Morison, who was subsequently MP for Inverness	Liberal
1918	constituency abolished	

== Election results ==
The original electorate for this constituency was limited to substantial landowners. The 40 shilling freehold qualification used for English county constituencies, which was not adjusted for inflation since it was first set in the 15th century, was significantly lower than the Scottish county qualification. In Scotland the qualification was land worth 40 shillings "of old extent", which prevented inflation lowering the real value of the property qualification required.

The county electorate, in Scotland, was significantly extended in 1832 and was further expanded in 1868 and 1885. The change, before and after 1832, can be seen by comparing the 32 votes cast at the contested election in 1802 with the 467 votes cast in 1832 (when the new registration system recorded a registered electorate of 669).

Unless otherwise indicated, the primary source for the results listed was Craig. Candidates identified by Craig as Conservatives, in the 1832-1835 Parliament, are listed as Tories. In elections before the formal creation of the Liberal Party, shortly after the 1859 general election, candidates identified by Craig as Liberals are classified as Whigs. There were no Radicals candidates in this seat, according to Stooks Smith. Craig's registered electorate and vote figures are sometimes different from those of Stooks Smith, but Craig's figures are used below. For details of the books of Craig and Stooks Smith, see the Reference section below.

The calculations of change in % vote and swing, for the 1835 general election result, relate the performance of the Conservative candidate to his achievements as the Tory candidate in the 1832 general election.

1800s – 1830s – 1840s – 1850s – 1860s – 1870s – 1880s – 1890s – 1900s – 1910s

=== Elections in the 1800s ===
General election 1802: Inverness-shire
Party	Candidate	Votes	%	±%
Nonpartisan	Charles Grant (senior)	15	46.9	N/A
Nonpartisan	Simon Fraser	11	34.4	N/A
Nonpartisan	Arthur Forbes	6	18.8	N/A
Majority		4	12.5	N/A
Turnout		32	N/A	N/A
Nonpartisan hold		Swing	N/A	

=== Elections in the 1830s ===
General election 1830: Inverness-shire
Party	Candidate	Votes	%
Whig	Charles Grant	Unopposed	
Registered electors		77	
Whig gain from Tory			

Grant was appointed as President of the Board of Control, requiring a by-election.

By-election, 30 December 1830: Inverness-shire
Party	Candidate	Votes	%
Whig	Charles Grant	Unopposed	
Registered electors		77	
Whig hold			

General election 1831: Inverness-shire
Party	Candidate	Votes	%
Whig	Charles Grant	Unopposed	
Registered electors		81	
Whig hold			

General election 1832: Inverness-shire
Party	Candidate	Votes	%
Whig	Charles Grant	257	55.0
Tory	John Norman McLeod	210	45.0
Majority		47	10.0
Turnout		467	69.8
Registered electors		669	
Whig hold			

General election 1835: Inverness-shire
Party	Candidate	Votes	%	±%
Whig	Charles Grant	260	50.7	−4.3
Conservative	John Norman McLeod	253	49.3	+4.3
Majority		7	1.4	−8.7
Turnout		513	71.5	+1.7
Registered electors		717		
Whig hold		Swing	−4.3	

- Appointment of Grant as Secretary of State for War and the Colonies and elevation to the peerage as the 1st Lord Glenelg

By-election, 15 May 1835: Inverness-shire
Party	Candidate	Votes	%	±%
Conservative	Alexander William Chisholm	268	52.8	+3.5
Whig	James Murray Grant	240	47.2	−3.5
Majority		28	5.6	N/A
Turnout		508	70.9	−0.6
Registered electors		717		
Conservative gain from Whig		Swing	+3.5	

General election 1837: Inverness-shire
Party	Candidate	Votes	%	±%
Conservative	Alexander William Chisholm	303	54.9	+5.6
Whig	James Murray Grant	249	45.1	−5.6
Majority		54	9.8	N/A
Turnout		552	73.3	+1.8
Registered electors		753		
Conservative gain from Whig		Swing	+5.6	

- Resignation of Chisholm, in June 1838

By-election, 12 June 1838: Inverness-shire
Party	Candidate	Votes	%
Conservative	Francis William Grant	Unopposed	
Conservative hold			

=== Elections in the 1840s ===
- Death of Grant

By-Election 31 March 1840: Inverness-shire
Party	Candidate	Votes	%	±%
Conservative	Henry Baillie	Unopposed		
Conservative hold				

General election 1841: Inverness-shire
Party	Candidate	Votes	%	±%
Conservative	Henry Baillie	Unopposed		
Registered electors		789		
Conservative hold				

General election 1847: Inverness-shire
Party	Candidate	Votes	%	±%
Conservative	Henry Baillie	Unopposed		
Registered electors		817		
Conservative hold				

=== Elections in the 1850s ===
General election 1852: Inverness-shire
Party	Candidate	Votes	%	±%
Conservative	Henry Baillie	Unopposed		
Registered electors		908		
Conservative hold				

General election 1857: Inverness-shire
Party	Candidate	Votes	%	±%
Conservative	Henry Baillie	Unopposed		
Registered electors		827		
Conservative hold				

General election 1859: Inverness-shire
Party	Candidate	Votes	%	±%
Conservative	Henry Baillie	Unopposed		
Registered electors		884		
Conservative hold				

=== Elections in the 1860s ===
General election 1865: Inverness-shire
Party	Candidate	Votes	%	±%
Conservative	Henry Baillie	336	53.1	N/A
Liberal	George MacPherson-Grant	297	46.9	New
Majority		39	6.2	N/A
Turnout		633	72.1	N/A
Registered electors		878		
Conservative hold		Swing	N/A	

General election 1868: Inverness-shire
Party	Candidate	Votes	%	±%
Conservative	Donald Cameron	Unopposed		
Registered electors		1,661		
Conservative hold				

=== Elections in the 1870s ===
General election 1874: Inverness-shire
Party	Candidate	Votes	%	±%
Conservative	Donald Cameron	Unopposed		
Registered electors		1,724		
Conservative hold				

- Appointment of Cameron as a Groom in Waiting to Her Majesty

By-Election 19 March 1874: Inverness-shire
Party	Candidate	Votes	%	±%
Conservative	Donald Cameron	Unopposed		
Conservative hold				

=== Elections in the 1880s ===
General election 1880: Inverness-shire
Party	Candidate	Votes	%	±%
Conservative	Donald Cameron	808	50.9	N/A
Liberal	Kenneth Mackenzie	779	49.1	New
Majority		29	1.8	N/A
Turnout		1,587	85.7	N/A
Registered electors		1,851		
Conservative hold		Swing	N/A	

General election 1885: Inverness-shire
Party	Candidate	Votes	%	±%
Independent Liberal (Crofters)	Charles Fraser-Mackintosh	3,555	47.5	New
Conservative	Reginald MacLeod	2,031	27.1	−23.8
Liberal	Kenneth Mackenzie	1,897	25.4	−23.7
Majority		1,524	20.4	N/A
Turnout		7,483	80.2	−5.5
Registered electors		9,330		
Independent Liberal gain from Conservative		Swing		

General election 1886: Inverness-shire
Party	Candidate	Votes	%	±%
Liberal Unionist (Crofters)	Charles Fraser-Mackintosh	Unopposed		
Liberal Unionist gain from Independent Liberal				

=== Elections in the 1890s ===
General election 1892: Inverness-shire
Party	Candidate	Votes	%	±%
Liberal (Crofters)	Donald MacGregor	3,035	52.9	New
Liberal Unionist	Charles Fraser-Mackintosh	2,706	47.1	N/A
Majority		329	5.8	N/A
Turnout		5,741	67.7	N/A
Registered electors		8,480		
Liberal gain from Liberal Unionist		Swing	N/A	

- Since the last election Fraser-Mackintosh had lost the support of the Highland Land League; which endorsed the Liberal nominee MacGregor as a Crofters' candidate.
- Resignation of MacGregor'

By-Election 13 June 1895: Inverness-shire
Party	Candidate	Votes	%	±%
Conservative	James Baillie	3,164	55.7	+8.6
Liberal (Crofters)	Donald Macrae	2,514	44.3	−8.6
Majority		650	11.4	N/A
Turnout		5,678	69.0	+1.3
Registered electors		8,229		
Conservative gain from Liberal		Swing	+8.6	

- The Highland Land League supported Macrae in this election, so he was a Crofters' candidate as well as the Liberal nominee.

General election 1895: Inverness-shire
Party	Candidate	Votes	%	±%
Conservative	James Baillie	2,991	50.9	+3.8
Liberal	Neil Kennedy	2,891	49.1	−3.8
Majority		100	1.8	N/A
Turnout		5,882	71.5	+3.8
Registered electors		8,229		
Conservative gain from Liberal		Swing	+3.8	

- Results compared with 1892 election, not the 1895 by-election.

=== Elections in the 1900s ===
General election 1900: Inverness-shire
Party	Candidate	Votes	%	±%
Liberal	John Dewar	3,168	52.5	+3.4
Conservative	Alfred Donald Mackintosh	2,867	47.5	−3.4
Majority		301	5.0	N/A
Turnout		6,035	66.6	−4.9
Registered electors		9,061		
Liberal gain from Conservative		Swing	-3.4 (L to C)	

General election 1906: Inverness-shire
Party	Candidate	Votes	%	±%
Liberal	John Dewar	3,918	68.4	+15.9
Conservative	L.H. Strain	1,810	31.6	−15.9
Majority		2,108	36.8	+31.8
Turnout		5,728	57.5	−9.1
Registered electors		9,957		
Liberal hold		Swing	-15.9 (L to C)	

=== Elections in the 1910s ===
General election January 1910: Inverness-shire
Party	Candidate	Votes	%	±%
Liberal	John Dewar	4,599	62.4	−6.0
Conservative	Reginald Macleod	2,774	37.6	+6.0
Majority		1,825	24.8	−12.0
Turnout		7,373	74.1	+16.6
Registered electors		9,951		
Liberal hold		Swing	+6.0 (L to C)	

General election December 1910: Inverness-shire
Party	Candidate	Votes	%	±%
Liberal	John Dewar	Unopposed		
Liberal hold				

- Creation of Dewar as the 1st Baron Forteviot

Thomas Morison

By-Election 2 January 1917: Inverness-shire
Party	Candidate	Votes	%	±%
Liberal	Thomas Brash Morison	Unopposed		
Liberal hold				

- Constituency abolished (1918)

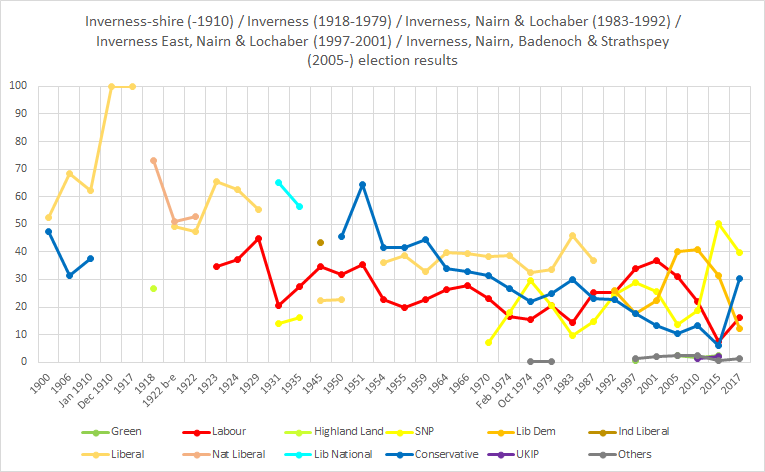
Inverness election history
