= Caroline Beaumont Zachry =

American educational psychologist

Caroline Beaumont Zachry (20 April 1894 – 22 February 1945) was an educational psychologist born in New York City to James Greer Zachry and Elise Clarkson Thompson. Her maternal grandfather was Hugh Smith Thompson the Governor of South Carolina from 1882 to 1886.

== Early life ==
Caroline attended the Spence School for girls from 1908 to 1914. For the next ten years she attended as well as taught at the Teachers College, Columbia University, where she received a B.S. in 1924. Under the direction of William Heard Kilpatrick, professor of philosophy of education, her dissertation on the personality adjustment of schoolchildren earned her a Ph.D. in 1929.

== Career ==
Her interest in psychology and its message to teachers prompted her to travel to Vienna in the 1930s where she studied under the psychiatrist Carl Jung. This experience influenced her intellectual development so much that, although not a psychiatrist, she became a Fellow of the American Orthopsychiatric Association. Her interest shifted from new methods of teaching to examining the psychological forces that determine the psychological development of schoolchildren. She was the director of Mental Hygiene Institute at the New Jersey State Teachers College (Now Montclair State College) from 1930 to 1934. From 1934 to 1939 she led the study of adolescence for the Commission on Secondary School Curriculum of the Progressive Education Association. The results of this study she published in 1940 as Emotion and Conduct in Adolescence. She went on to become the director of the Institute for the Study of Personality Development which was renamed after her death to the Caroline B. Zachry Institute of Human Development. In 1942 she was appointed director of the Bureau of Child Guidance of the New York City Board of Education that lasted until her death three years later in 1945.

== Family ==
Caroline was never married but adopted two children in the 1930s, Stephen Beaumont and Nancy Greer.

== Works ==
- Illustrations of English Work in the Junior High School. 1925
- Personality Adjustments of School Children. 1929
- Reorganizing Secondary Education. 1939 (co-authored with Vivian T. Thayer and Ruth Kotinsky)
- Democracy and the Curriculum. 1939
