= 1917 Inverness-shire by-election =

UK parliamentary by-election

The 1917 Inverness-shire by-election was a parliamentary by-election held for the UK House of Commons constituency of Inverness-shire in the Scottish Highlands on 2 January 1917.

== Vacancy ==
The by-election was caused by the elevation to the peerage of the sitting Liberal MP, John Dewar. Dewar had held the seat since 1900 and had been unopposed at the previous election in December 1910.

== Candidates ==
Thomas Morison

The Inverness-shire Liberals adopted Thomas Brash Morison KC as their new candidate. Morison was a barrister who had been serving as Solicitor General for Scotland since 1913.

There was at this time no tradition of candidates from organised labour contesting Parliamentary elections in this constituency. No nominations were received from the Conservatives who were partners in the wartime Coalition and were presumably content to honour the wartime electoral truce. Morison was therefore returned unopposed.

== Result ==
Inverness-shire by-election, 1917
Party	Candidate	Votes	%	±%
Liberal	Thomas Brash Morison	Unopposed	N/A	N/A
Liberal hold				

== See also ==
- Lists of United Kingdom by-elections
- United Kingdom by-election records
