= Elisabeth C. Draper =

Elisabeth C. Draper (1900-1993) was a prominent interior decorator in New York City. Mrs. Draper was one of the grande dames of decorating in an era when a professionally decorated home was a mark of privilege. She became known for comfortable rooms that mixed antiques with contemporary furnishings.

== Early life ==
She was born Elisabeth Carrington Frank in New York City in 1900, the daughter of Charles and Louise Frank. She attended Miss Spence's School but left before her graduation in 1918 to be trained as a radio operator 1st class, and served in that capacity until the end of World War I.

== Career ==
In 1929 Mrs. Draper and her sister, Tiffany Taylor, establishing a decorating firm called Taylor & Low. In 1935 she married Dr. George Draper and the next year she established a business under her own name.

In 1948 she was hired by Columbia University to refurbish the President's House to make it ready for the new president of Columbia, Dwight D. Eisenhower. She decorated the Eisenhowers' New York home as well as the Eisenhower farmhouse in Gettysburg, Pennsylvania. In 1980 Mrs. Draper was hired as a consultant to help the National Park Service document the history of the interior of the Eisenhower’s Gettysburg farmhouse.

She decorated the American Embassy in Paris for Ambassador Amory Houghton, worked on a number of rooms at the White House, and did the interiors of Blair House. The Old Merchant's House on East Fourth Street in Manhattan was restored under her direction. In 1967, she said: "I came along in that lovely ladies' era of decorating and just before all the talented men began emerging in the field."
