= Spence School =

Private, all-girls, college-prep school in New York City

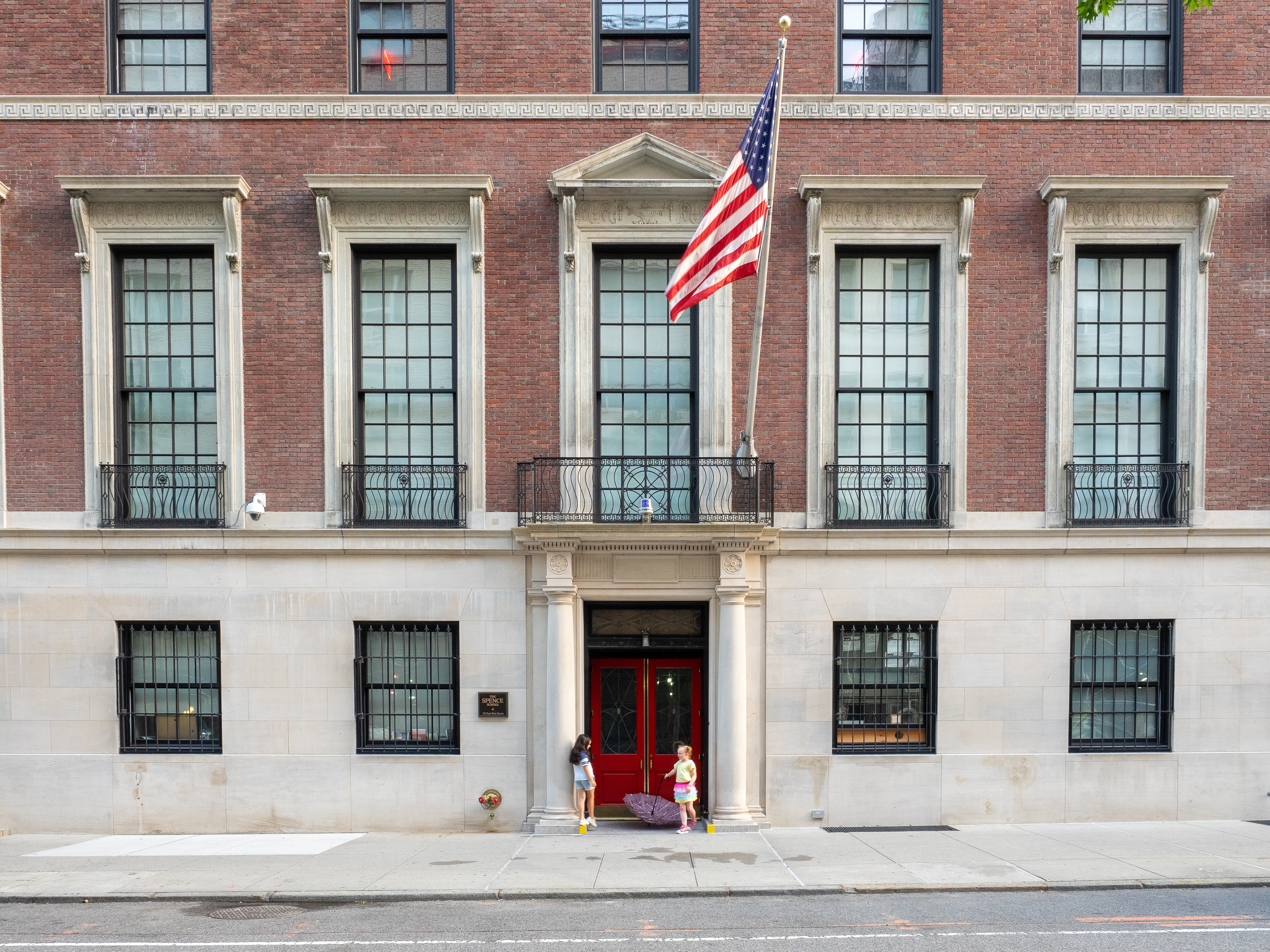
- Entrance to the Upper School (2019)

Location
- 56 East 93rd Street (Lower School); 22 East 91st Street (Middle/Upper School); New York City (Manhattan), New York 10128; United States; 40°47′03″N 73°57′25″W

Information
- Type: Private, Day, College-prep
- Motto: Latin: Non scholae sed vitae discimus (Not for school, but for life we learn)
- Established: 1892
- Founder: Clara B. Spence
- Head of School: Felicia Wilks
- Faculty: 210 (2014–15)
- Grades: K–12
- Gender: Girls
- Enrollment: 736 (2014–15)
- Student to teacher ratio: 7:1
- Campus: Urban
- Colors: Blue, Gold and White
- Athletics conference: AAIS (most sports); NYSAISAA
- Nickname: Sabers
- Accreditation: NYSAIS
- Tuition: $68,480 (2025-2026)
- Affiliations: New York Interschool
- Website: www.spenceschool.org

The Spence School is an American all-girls private school in New York City, founded in 1892 by Clara B. Spence.

Spence has about 740 students, with grades K-4 representing the Lower School, 5-8 representing the Middle School, and 9-12 representing the Upper School. Lower school average class sizes are 16-18 and middle and upper school average class sizes are 13–14. The student: teacher ratio is 7:1 and students of color in all grades make up approximately 33 percent of the student body.

For the 2025–26 academic year, tuition and fees total $68,480 for all grades. Its sister schools are the all-girls Brearley School, the all-girls Chapin School and the all-boys Collegiate School, all in New York City. Forbes magazine ranked Spence ninth on its "America's Best Prep Schools" list in 2010.

== History ==
The Spence School was founded in 1892 by Clara B. Spence, who was its head for 31 years. The school's motto is non scholae sed vitae discimus (Latin for 'Not for school, but for life we learn'). The first building was located on New York City's West 48th Street. The school once had a boarding option, but all current girls are day students.

Clara B. Spence described her school as: "A place not of mechanical instruction, but a school of character where the common requisites for all have been human feeling, a sense of humor and the spirit of intellectual and moral adventure."

Spence read from Shakespeare in dramatic declamation every week. She was known for her conservative comportment and strictness, but also her devotion to women's rights. She arranged for Edith Wharton, Helen Keller, and George Washington Carver to speak at the school. Isadora Duncan taught dance classes.

In a commencement address from an unknown year, Spence said that cultivating imagination was an important skill, since “sympathy, that great bond between human beings, is largely dependent on imagination—that is, upon the power of realizing the feelings and the circumstances of others so as to enable us to feel with and for them.”

The school has been located on East 91st Street since 1929.

In 1987, renovation and expansion of the 91st street campus was completed by FXCollaborative, including the addition of a three-story building on the western side of the campus. When the school wanted to expand and build on the lot in the 1990s, they built a new playground on the roof of the new building to meet the stipulations of the gift. In 2004, the Lower School (Kindergarten through Grade 4) was moved to a restored landmark five-story building at 53 East 93rd Street. In 1999, the school purchased the William Goadby Loew House at 53 E 93rd Street for use as its Lower School building. In 2008, Spence acquired the adjoining Wanamaker-Munn townhouse on 90th street for use as its Upper School facilities.

== Academics ==
Spence offers a liberal arts and science curriculum, including programs in the arts and foreign languages.

== Notable alumnae ==
- Serena Altschul, broadcast journalist
- Madeleine Astor, Titanic survivor
- Maiken Baird, film producer
- Frances Baldwin, artist
- Edith Bouvier Beale, socialite
- Georgina Bloomberg, equestrienne, daughter of Michael Bloomberg
- Doris Caesar, sculptor
- Eleanor A. Campbell, physician and founder of Judson Health Center
- Huguette M. Clark, artist and philanthropist
- Louise Olga Gaylord Dillingham, socialite, community civic leader, and philanthropist
- Melissa Doi, businesswoman and victim of 9/11 terrorist attacks
- Lady Malcolm Douglas-Hamilton, philanthropist and anti-communist
- Elisabeth C. Draper, interior decorator
- Ruth Wales du Pont, socialite, philanthropist, and composer
- Dawn French, comedian
- Helen Clay Frick, philanthropist and art collector
- Caroline Gorman, singer
- Francine du Plessix Gray, author and literary critic
- Patricia Wright Gwyn, politician and librarian
- Michelle Harper, brand consultant, entrepreneur, member of the International Best Dressed List
- Angelia Lawrance Morrison Harris, First Lady of North Carolina
- Janet Hobhouse, novelist and biographer
- Nancy Hopkins, molecular biologist
- Jade Jagger, jewelry designer
- Bonnie Jenkins, public servant
- Jill Kargman, actress, writer
- Jane Kim, politician
- Greta Kline, singer
- Margaret Carnegie Miller, philanthropist
- Alley Mills, actress
- Elizabeth Montgomery, actress
- Sara Wiborg Murphy, socialite
- Dorothy Klenke Nash, neurosurgeon
- Gwyneth Paltrow, actress
- Mary Ellis Peltz, music critic and poet
- Karen Polle, equestrian
- Marjorie Merriweather Post, philanthropist
- Sally Pressman, actress
- Louise Goff Reece, politician
- Evette Rios, lifestyle expert
- Emmy Rossum, actress
- Franca Somigli, soprano
- Heidi Vanderbilt, actress, photographer, and writer
- Natalie Mai Vitetti, socialite
- Kerry Washington, actress
- Electra Havemeyer Webb, arts patron
- Caroline Beaumont Zachry, psychologist

== Affiliated organizations ==
- National Coalition of Girls' Schools
- New York State Association of Independent Schools
- New York Interschool

== See also ==
- Education in New York City
