= Donald Cameron of Lochiel (1835–1905) =

Scottish clan chief (1835–1905)

The Much Honoured Donald Cameron of Lochiel JP DL FRGS
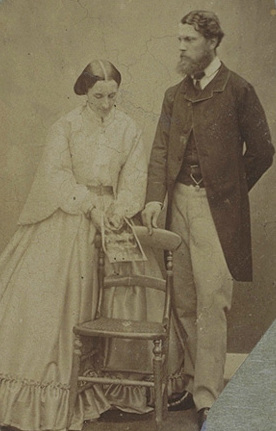
- With Viscountess Hawarden, 1861

Lord Lieutenant of Inverness
- In office 1887–1905
- Preceded by: The Lord Lovat
- Succeeded by: Alfred Mackintosh

Member of Parliament for Inverness-shire
- In office 1868–1885
- Preceded by: Henry Baillie
- Succeeded by: Charles Fraser-Mackintosh

Personal details
- Born: Donald Cameron; 5 April 1835
- Died: 30 November 1905 (aged 70) Achnacarry, Inverness-shire, Scotland
- Spouse: Lady Margaret Montagu Douglas Scott (m. 1875)
- Children: 4, including Donald Walter
- Parent(s): Donald Cameron of Lochiel; Lady Vere Hobart

Donald Cameron of Lochiel, JP, DL, FRGS (5 April 1835 – 30 November 1905) was a Scottish landowner, Conservative Member of Parliament and diplomat. He was the 24th Chief of Clan Cameron.

== Early life ==
Lochiel was the eldest son of Donald Cameron of Lochiel and Lady Vere Catherine Louisa Hobart (1803–1888), of Hampden House, Buckinghamshire. His mother, a sister of the 5th Earl of Buckinghamshire, was daughter of The Hon. George Vere Hobart by his second wife Janet Maclean – a scion of the Camerons of Glendessary. Lochaber joyously celebrated the birth of Lochiel's heir during the spring of 1835, with commemorative dinners held by Camerons and the lighting of bonfires on Ben Nevis.

He was educated at Harrow, and shortly thereafter entered into the Diplomatic service.

== Career ==
=== Diplomacy ===
Entering the Foreign Office in 1852, Cameron was appointed a secretary of the British Embassy at Berne, Switzerland. He was then a paid attaché at Copenhagen, Berlin and Stockholm. In 1857, he was appointed First Attaché of the Earl of Elgin's special embassy to China and Japan during the Second Opium War. He retired from the diplomatic service in 1859.

=== Public life ===
At the 1868 general election Cameron was elected Member of Parliament for Inverness-shire and took his seat in the House of Commons, which he held until 1885. He was a Justice of the peace and Deputy lieutenant for Inverness-shire and Buckinghamshire, respectively. From 1887, he held the office of Lord Lieutenant of Inverness-shire. From 1874 to 1880, Lochiel served as groom-in-waiting to Queen Victoria, whom he had hosted during a Royal visit to Achnacarry in 1873.

Active in sheep farming, Lochiel had to take on the stakes of most of the sheep farms on his estate during the acute depression in the industry. As such, he had an intimate knowledge of the shepherds plight, and that of the related business of deer stalking. He was appointed in 1883 to the Napier Association to enquire into the grievances of the crofters, and was later named to the Deer Forest Commission in 1894. In 1886, his nephew the Earl of Dalkeith was accidentally killed while stalking near Achnacarry.

Lochiel owned 125,000 acres, with 110,000 in Inverness-shire, 16,000 in Argyll and 400 in Buckinghamshire.

== Marriage and children ==
In 1875, Lochiel married Lady Margaret Elizabeth Montagu Douglas Scott (1846–1918), the second daughter of Walter Montagu Douglas Scott, 5th Duke of Buccleuch and sister of the 1st Baron Montagu of Beaulieu. They had four sons:

- Col. Sir Donald Walter Cameron, 25th Lochiel, KT (1876–1951), commanding officer of the Queen's Own Cameron Highlanders who succeeded as Chief; married Lady Hermione Graham, daughter of the 5th Duke of Montrose.
- Maj. Ewen Charles Cameron (1878–1958), officer of the Lovat Scouts.
- Capt. Allan George Cameron (1880–1914), killed near Aisne during World War I.
- Archibald Cameron (1886–1917), killed at the Battle of Arras during World War I.

== Commemoration ==
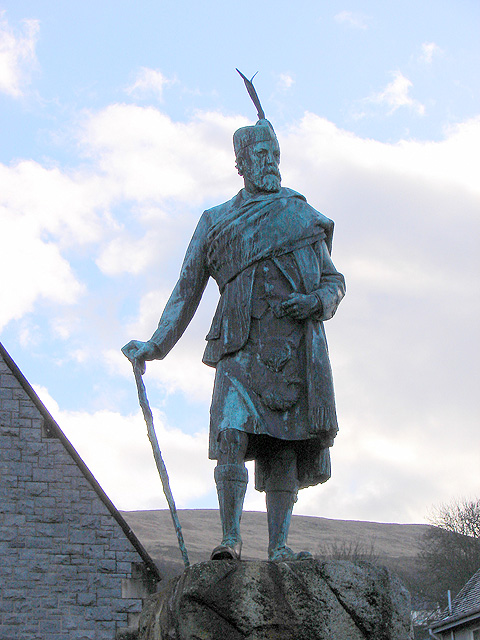
Statue in Fort William

Lochiel is commemorated with a statue in Fort William on the Parade, erected circa 1905. He is depicted in full Highland regalia with an inscription in Scottish Gaelic which reads: Dòmhnall Camshron mac Dhòmhnaill Dubh. The statue serves as tribute to a Highland gentleman who faithfully served both Lochaber and his clan during his lifetime.

Parliament of the United Kingdom
Preceded by Henry James Baillie	Member of Parliament for Inverness-shire; 1868–1885	Succeeded by Charles Fraser-Mackintosh
Honorary titles
Preceded by The Lord Lovat	Lord Lieutenant of Inverness; 1887–1905	Succeeded by Alfred Mackintosh
