= Doris Caesar =

American sculptor (1892–1971)

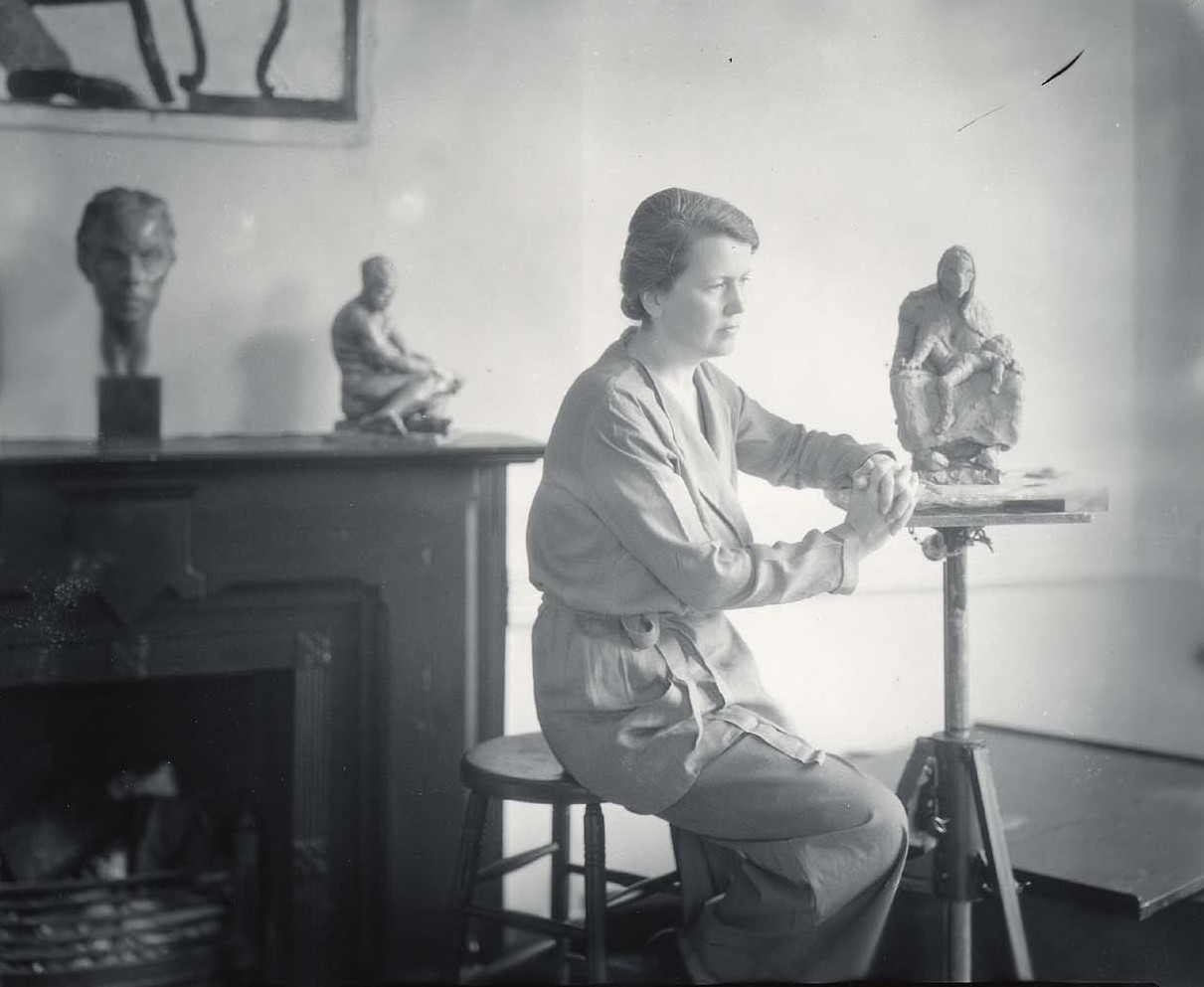
- Born: November 8, 1892; Brooklyn, New York
- Died: 1971; Litchfield, Connecticut
- Education: Art Students League of New York
- Known for: Sculpture

Doris Porter Caesar (November 8, 1892 – 1971) was an American sculptor best known for her portrayals of the nude female body.

== Early life and education ==
Doris Porter Caesar was born in Brooklyn. Her mother, Lillian Dean Porter, died of pneumonia when Doris was eleven years old. As she grew up, her father, Alfred Haynes Porter, regularly took her to the theatre and on trips to Europe and Africa, experiences that bore an influence on her later work.

Caesar attended Miss Chapin's School before transferring to the Spence School and the Art Students League, where she studied under George Bridgman. In 1913, she married and subsequently had three children. In 1925 she studied under Alexander Archipenko, under whom she developed her expressionistic approach to representing the female body. Doris' first solo show occurred in 1931 at the Montross Gallery.

== Work ==
Caesar experimented with sculpting the female body in clay, bronze, and brass, often elongating the figures to be taller than human height. In 1927, she cast her first bronze, the primary material she would work with throughout her career. She took this bronze to E. Weyhe, a dealer on Lexington Avenue in New York City, who gave her access to his collection of German Expressionist artists. There, she was inspired by Ernst Barlach, Wilhelm Lehmbruck, and Käthe Kollwitz, whose work led her to turn away from classical forms and begin distorting the figures she sculpted until they were "stick-like." Unfortunately, most of her work in the 1920s and 1930s was destroyed; the bulk of her major work was created in the following two decades after she moved to North Salem, New York and then to Litchfield, Connecticut, where she died in 1971. In an article published in Hill News (March 11, 1975), Caesar says that she chose sculpture "because it's big and fights against you all the time."

=== Major works ===
Doris Caesar, Kneeling Torso, bronze sculpture with green-brown patina, 1955

- 1947: Mother and Child
- 1950: Descent from the Cross
- 1955: Kneeling Torso
- 1957: Ascent

=== Exhibitions ===
- 1931: First solo exhibition at the Montross Gallery in New York City
- 1934: Solo exhibition at the Montross Gallery
- 1935: Solo exhibition at the E. Weyhe Bookshop and Gallery, New York City
- 1943: Exhibition by Curt Valentin, New York City
- 1957: Annual Exhibition, Whitney Museum, New York City
- 1959: "Four American Expressionists," Whitney Museum, New York City
