= Lady Malcolm Douglas-Hamilton =

American socialite and philanthropist

Lady Malcolm Douglas-Hamilton CBE
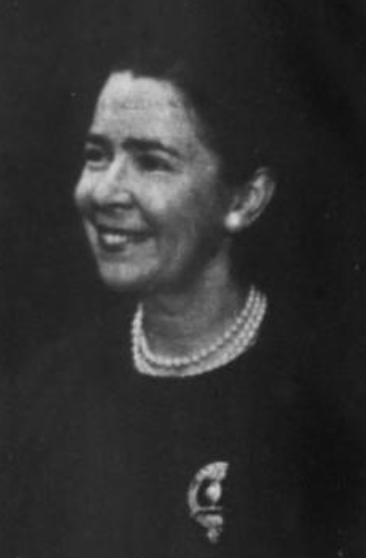
- Lady Malcolm Douglas-Hamilton, from a 1966 publication of the US State Department
- Born: Natalie Scarritt Wales; August 6, 1909; Cohasset, Massachusetts
- Died: January 14, 2013 (age 103); Andover, New Jersey
- Education: Spence School; Columbia University
- Occupations: Socialite, philanthropist
- Spouse: Kenelm Winslow (m. 1929; div. 1937) Edward Latham (m. 1937; div. 1940) Edward Bragg Paine (m. 1947; died 1951) Lord Malcolm Douglas-Hamilton (m. 1953; died 1964)
- Children: Two daughters
- Parent: Nathaniel B. Wales

Lady Malcolm Douglas-Hamilton CBE (born Natalie Scarritt Wales in Cohasset, Massachusetts, August 6, 1909; died Andover, New Jersey, January 14, 2013) was an American socialite and philanthropist best known for organizing the "Bundles for Britain" campaign during World War II.

== Early life ==
Born Natalie Scarritt Wales in Cohasset, Massachusetts, she was the daughter of inventor and businessman Nathaniel B. Wales, inventor of the Kelvinator refrigerator. Educated at the elite Spence School in New York City, classmates remembered her as "annoyingly popular with the opposite sex"; she once invited thirty boys to a tea party - and no other girls. She was touring Europe at seventeen and almost married an English aristocrat, until her parents brought her home and sent her to Columbia University instead. She had her formal society debut the next year.

She married a stockbroker named Kenelm Winslow in 1929; they had two children, her daughters Natalie "Bubbles" (1930-1988) and Mary-Chilton "Mimi" (1934-2014), before they divorced. She married diplomat Edward Latham in 1937, a marriage that ended in divorce in 1939.

== Bundles for Britain ==
Shortly after Winston Churchill became Prime Minister in May 1940, Natalie Latham sent a telegram to his wife Clementine asking what the British needed to help fight the war; Clementine replied that they needed warm socks for British sailors. Latham set to work, organizing her society friends and carefully following British Navy regulations. "Hopelessly fond of organizing" as she said of herself and with many Americans anxious to help, "Bundles to Britain" soon became a major enterprise, raising money through a variety of means and shipping millions of dollars' worth of goods to Britain - clothing, blankets, ambulances, X-ray machines, hospital beds, oxygen tents, surgical instruments, blood transfusion kits, tinned food and children’s cots. An auction in England featured several items donated by the queen; Andrew Carnegie's wife made a major donation, actress Joan Crawford encouraged fans to send money to "Bundles" instead of buying her holiday gifts, and Eleanor Roosevelt spoke at a fundraiser. Hollywood fictionalized Natalie Latham as socialite "Dorothy Bryant" (played by Laraine Day) in the 1943 movie Mr. Lucky.

Another wartime effort of Latham's was the 1941 "Barkers for Britain" campaign, which raised money by selling membership tags for dogs. Fala, Franklin Roosevelt's dog, was issued tag #1 and made honorary president of the organization. Over 30,000 tags were issued. Another of her campaigns, "Bundles for America", raised money for needy Americans during the war.

After the war, Natalie Latham was made an honorary Commander of the British Empire.

== Anti-Communism ==
In June 1947 Latham married Edward Bragg "Ned" Paine, another scion of a wealthy old New England family, who had previously been married to Louise Mitchell Paine (later married to George Washington Vanderbilt III). In 1947 they founded an anti-Communist organization called "Common Cause" (not related to the modern public interest lobbying group). Paine died November 16, 1951, at the age of 42. Natalie Paine continued his work, encouraging the creation of a sister organization in Great Britain in late 1951, somewhat to the distress of the British Foreign Office. One of the prominent members was Scottish Conservative MP Lord Malcolm Douglas-Hamilton; while in England in 1953 to give speeches on anti-Communism, Natalie married him - following his divorce from Pamela Bowes-Lyon, a granddaughter of Claude Bowes-Lyon, 13th Earl of Strathmore and Kinghorne and cousin of the Queen Mother. After his term in Parliament ended in 1954 the couple moved to America. Now Lady Malcolm Douglas-Hamilton, she continued to be active in anti-Communist organizations. She founded the moralizing "Committee to Unite America". She appeared on the conservative Manion Forum radio talk show to promote it. In the late 1970s she was on the board of the American Security Council Education Foundation, which attempted to sue CBS over perceived bias in reporting on national security issues under the fairness doctrine.

A charitable organization she founded, the Friends of Haiti, was accused by some of being too close to the dictator François Duvalier. She was in fact an enthusiastic supporter of Duvalier, at least in his early years in power.

== Scottish relations ==
In 1956 Lady Malcolm and her husband founded the American-Scottish Foundation to promote cultural relations between the two countries. Lord Malcolm Douglas-Hamilton founded an air charter company in the early 1960s and enjoyed exploring remote areas of the world; he died July 21, 1964, age 54, in an airplane accident in Cameroon, along with his son Niall.

In the early 1970s Lady Malcolm Douglas-Hamilton organized "Scotland Week" along Fifth Avenue in New York City, with store displays featuring Scottish themes, and in 1971 initiated an annual American-Scottish Ball at the Plaza Hotel featuring Highland dancing.

After living for many years on the Upper East Side, she retired to Stillwater, New Jersey. Lady Malcolm died on January 14, 2013 at the age of 103 and was survived by one of her two daughters, six grandchildren and 11 great-grandchildren.

== Other activities ==
Lady Malcolm Douglas-Hamilton also headed the American Institute of Approval, a women's organization which aimed to promote good taste. The organization sponsored the House of Good Taste exhibit at the 1964 World's Fair in New York City.
