= Mary Ellis Peltz =

American poet

Mary Ellis Peltz (4 May 1896 – 24 October 1981) was an American drama and music critic, magazine editor, poet, and writer on the subject of music. Born Mary Ellis Opdycke, in New York, she was educated at the Spence School and Barnard College (Phi Beta Kappa). At the age of 24, she joined the staff of The New York Sun as assistant music critic. She left the paper in 1924 when she married John DeWitt Peltz. She later worked for The Junior League Magazine as a drama critic and published poetry and articles in a variety of publications, including Harper's Magazine, Poetry, and Vogue. In 1936 she became the first chief editor of Opera News, a position she held until 1957 when she founded the Metropolitan Opera's archives. She served as director of the Met's archives from 1957 to 1981.

Mary Ellis Peltz is buried in Green-Wood Cemetery, Brooklyn, New York.
