= Desmond Nethersole-Thompson =

British teacher, ornithologist and writer

Desmond Nethersole-Thompson (1908–1989) was a British teacher, ornithologist and writer. Of Irish stock, Nethersole-Thompson was brought up in the south of England, and educated at St Paul's School, London and the London School of Economics. From the 1930s he spent most of his life in Scotland and is notable for his contribution to ornithology through his monographs on various birds of the Scottish Highlands, as well as his other writings. He was one of a generation of country-lovers who transferred their field craft from stalking, hunting and collecting to observing the previously unstudied behaviours of wild animals.

Together with his second wife, Maimie (1930–2015), Nethersole-Thompson raised six children: Bruin, Patrick, Richard, Maimie, Eamonn and Katherine, all of whom grew up involved in the family wader research.

Nethersole-Thompson stood as a parliamentary candidate for the Labour Party in Inverness at the 1950 and 1955 general elections. He was also an elected member of Inverness County Council.

In 1981, Nethersole-Thompson was awarded the Neill Prize by the Royal Society of Edinburgh for his tireless fieldwork and detailed publications, and in 1983 he received an Honorary D.Sc. from the University of Aberdeen.

== Bibliography ==
Books authored or co-authored by Nethersole-Thompson include:

- 1951 – The Greenshank (New Naturalist Monograph no.5), London: Collins
- 1966 – The Snow Bunting, Edinburgh: Oliver & Boyd
- 1971 – Highland Birds (Highland Life series), Highlands and Islands Development Board; London
- 1974 – The Cairngorms: their natural history and scenery, London: Collins
- 1975 – Pine Crossbills: a Scottish Contribution, Berkhamsted: Poyser
- 1979 – Greenshanks (with Maimie Nethersole-Thompson), Berkhamsted: Poyser
- 1986 – Waders, their breeding, haunts and watchers (with Maimie Nethersole-Thompson), Berkhamsted: Poyser
- 1988 – The Oystercatcher (Shire Natural History), Shire Publications
- 1992 – In Search of Breeding Birds, Leeds: Peregrine Books
- 2002 – Tundra Plovers: the Eurasian, Pacific and American Golden Plovers, and Grey Plover (with Ingvar Byrkjedal and Des Thompson), Berkhamsted: Poyser
