= Secretary to the Board of Control =

The Secretary to the Board of Control was a British government office in the late 18th and early 19th century, supporting the President of the Board of Control, who was responsible for overseeing the British East India Company and generally serving as the chief official in London responsible for Indian affairs. During part of 1834 and from 1835 the post was held by Joint Secretaries. The position was abolished in 1858 with the abolition of the East India Company. It was succeeded by the new position of Under-Secretary of State for India.

== Secretaries to the Board of Control, 1784-1858 ==
- 8 September 1784: Charles William Rouse-Boughton
- 10 May 1791: Henry Beaufoy
- 3 July 1793: William Brodrick
- 19 November 1803: Benjamin Hobhouse
- 22 May 1804: George Peter Holford
- 14 February 1806: Thomas Creevey
- 8 April 1807: George Peter Holford
- 6 January 1810: Sir Patrick Murray, 6th Baronet
- 14 March 1812: John Bruce
- 20 August 1812: Thomas Courtenay
- 2 May 1829: George Bankes
- 16 February 1830: John Stuart-Wortley
- 18 December 1830: Dudley Ryder, Viscount Sandon
- 18 May 1831: Thomas Hyde Villiers
- 19 December 1832: Thomas Babington Macaulay
- 26 December 1833: Robert Gordon (to 1834)
- 22 April 1834: James Alexander Stewart Mackenzie (to 1834)
- 20 December 1834: Winthrop Mackworth Praed (to 1835)
- 8 January 1835: Sidney Herbert (to 1835)
- 21 April 1835: Robert Gordon (to 1839)
- 21 April 1835: Robert Vernon Smith (to 1839)
- 30 September 1839: Edward Seymour, Lord Seymour (to 1841)
- 30 September 1839: William Clay (to 1841)
- 21 June 1841: Charles Buller (to 1841)
- 8 September 1841: James Emerson Tennent (to 1845)
- 8 September 1841: Bingham Baring (to 1845)
- 17 February 1845: Robert Jocelyn, Viscount Jocelyn (to 1846)
- 5 August 1845: Philip Stanhope, Viscount Mahon (to 1846)
- 6 July 1846: George Stevens Byng (to 1847)
- 6 July 1846: Thomas Wyse (to 1849)
- 30 November 1847: George Cornewall Lewis (to 1848)
- 16 May 1848: James Wilson (to 1852)
- 26 Jan 1849: John Elliot (to 1852)
- 1852: Henry Baillie (to 1852)
- 1852: Charles Bruce (to 1852)
- 1852: Robert Lowe (to 1855)
- 1852: Thomas Nicholas Redington (permanent)
- 1855: Henry Danby Seymour
- 1858: Henry Baillie
