= Henry Baillie =

British politician

Colonel The Right Honourable Henry Baillie

Under-Secretary of State for India
- In office 30 September 1858 – 11 June 1859
- Monarch: Victoria
- Prime Minister: The Earl of Derby
- Preceded by: New office
- Succeeded by: Thomas Baring

Personal details
- Born: 1803
- Died: 16 December 1885 (aged 81–82)
- Party: Conservative
- Spouse(s): (1) Hon. Philippa Eliza Sydney Smythe (d. 1854) (2) Clarissa Rush

Colonel Henry James Baillie PC (1803 – 16 December 1885), was a British Conservative politician. He served under Lord Derby as Under-Secretary of State for India from 1858 to 1859.

== Background ==
Baillie was the son of Colonel Hugh Duncan Baillie, son of Evan Baillie, by his first wife Elizabeth, daughter of Reverend Henry Reynett. Peter Baillie and James Evan Baillie were his uncles. He was educated at Eton College.

== Political career ==
Baillie was a friend of Benjamin Disraeli, and in 1835 was actually called upon by Disraeli to serve as his second (after d'Orsay declined), when it appeared that Disraeli and Morgan O'Connell, the son of Daniel O'Connell, were going to fight a duel, which apparently did not actually occur. In 1840 Baillie was elected Member of Parliament for Inverness-shire, and retained that seat until 1868. In the early 1840s he was associated with the "Young England" movement, of which Disraeli was the head. Another member of that group, George Smythe, was Baillie's brother-in-law. He apparently broke with Sir Robert Peel over the Corn Laws and accepted minor office in Lord Derby's 1852 government as Joint Secretary to the Board of Control. He again held office under Derby as Under-Secretary of State for India from 1858 to 1859. In 1866 he was sworn of the Privy Council.

== Family ==
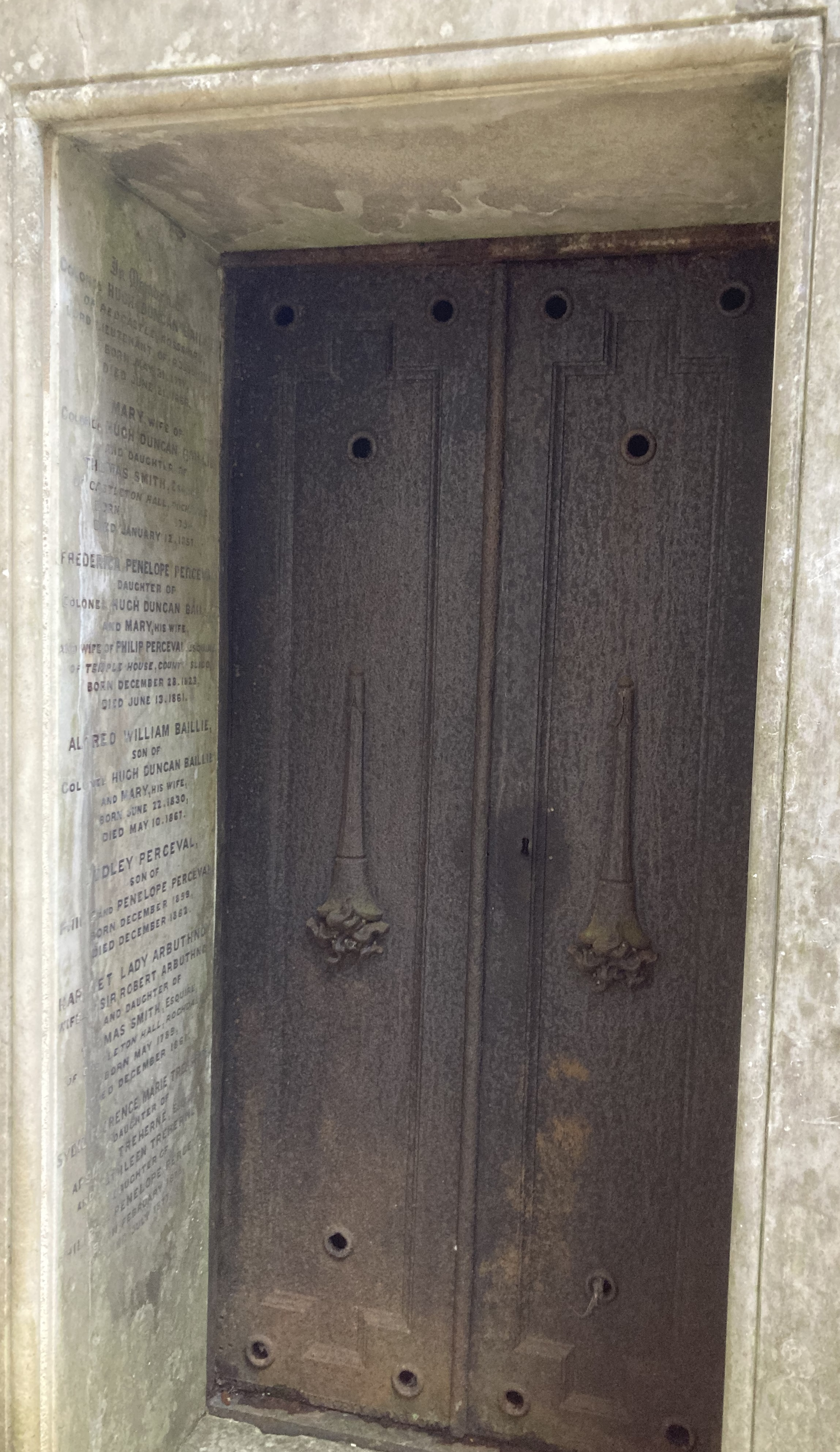
Grave of Henry James Baillie in the Baillie family vault in the Lebanon Circle in Highgate Cemetery

Baillie married firstly the Honourable Philippa Eliza Sydney Smythe, daughter of Percy Smythe, 6th Viscount Strangford, in 1840. They had several children. After Philippa's death in June 1854 he married secondly Clarissa Rush, daughter of George Rush, in 1857. Baillie died at the age of 82 and was buried in the Baillie family vault in the Lebanon Circle on the west side of Highgate Cemetery.

Parliament of the United Kingdom
Preceded by Francis William Grant	Member of Parliament for Inverness-shire; 1840–1868	Succeeded by Donald Cameron
Political offices
Preceded by James Wilson; John Elliot	Joint Secretary of the Board of Control; 1852; With: Charles Cumming-Bruce	Succeeded by Robert Lowe; Thomas Nicholas Redington
New office	Under-Secretary of State for India; 1858–1859	Succeeded by Thomas Baring
