= Inverness (UK Parliament constituency) =

Parliamentary constituency in the United Kingdom, 1918–1983

- Former county constituency for the House of Commons

1918–1983
- Seats: One
- Created from: Inverness-shire and Inverness Burghs
- Replaced by: Inverness, Nairn and Lochaber and Ross, Cromarty and Skye

Inverness was a county constituency of the House of Commons of the Parliament of the United Kingdom from 1918 until 1983. It elected one Member of Parliament (MP) by the first-past-the-post system of election.

There was also a county constituency called Inverness-shire, 1708 to 1918, and a burgh constituency called Inverness Burghs, 1708 to 1918.

== Boundaries ==
The earlier Inverness-shire constituency covered, nominally, the county of Inverness minus the burgh of Inverness, which was a part of the Inverness Burghs constituency. By 1918, however, county boundaries were out of alignment with constituency boundaries.

In 1918, the Representation of the People Act 1918 created new constituency boundaries, taking account of new local government boundaries, and the new constituency boundaries were first used in the 1918 general election.

The new Inverness constituency included the burgh of Inverness and was one of three constituencies covering the county of Inverness and the county of Ross and Cromarty. The other two were the Ross and Cromarty constituency and the Western Isles constituency.

The Inverness constituency covered the county of Inverness minus Outer Hebridean areas (the districts of Harris, North Uist and South Uist), which were covered by the Western Isles constituency. The same boundaries were used in every election from 1918 onwards.

In 1975, counties and burghs were abolished as local government areas, under the Local Government (Scotland) Act 1973, and from 1975 until 1983, the Inverness constituency was entirely within the Highland local government region.

For the 1983 general election, new boundaries defined three new constituencies to cover the region: Inverness, Nairn and Lochaber, Ross, Cromarty and Skye and Caithness and Sutherland. Each of the new constituencies covered a number of the districts of the region. The Caithness and Sutherland constituency carried forward the name of an older constituency.

== Members of Parliament ==
Election	Member	Party	Notes
1918	Thomas Brash Morison	Coalition Liberal	Previously MP for Inverness-shire
1922 by-election	Sir Murdoch Macdonald	Coalition Liberal	
1922	Sir Murdoch Macdonald	National Liberal	
1922	Sir Murdoch Macdonald	Liberal	
1931	Sir Murdoch Macdonald	Liberal National	
1950	Lord Malcolm Douglas-Hamilton	Unionist	
1954 by-election	Neil McLean	Unionist	
1964	Russell Johnston	Liberal	Subsequently, MP for Inverness, Nairn and Lochaber
1983	constituency abolished		

== Election results ==
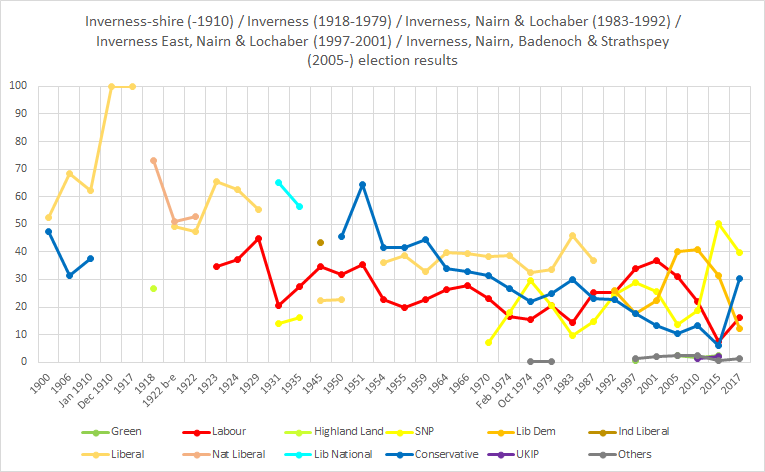
Inverness election history

=== Elections in the 1910s ===
Thomas Morison

UK General Election, 1918: Inverness
Party		Candidate	Votes	%	±%
C	Liberal	Thomas Morison	7,991	73.2	N/A
	Highland Land League	George James Bruce	2,930	26.8	N/A
Majority			5,061	46.4	N/A
Turnout			10,921	37.3	N/A
Registered electors			29,263		
	Liberal win (new seat)				
C indicates candidate endorsed by the coalition government.

=== Elections in the 1920s ===
1922 Inverness by-election
Party	Candidate	Votes	%	±%
National Liberal	Murdoch Macdonald	8,340	51.0	−22.2
Independent Liberal	Alexander Livingstone	8,024	49.0	−24.2
Majority		316	2.0	−44.4
Turnout		16,364	50.1	+13.8
Registered electors		32,695		
National Liberal hold		Swing	−22.2	

UK General Election, 1922: Inverness
Party	Candidate	Votes	%	±%
National Liberal	Murdoch Macdonald	9,796	52.7	−20.5
Liberal	Alexander Livingstone	8,785	47.3	−25.9
Majority		1,011	5.4	−41.0
Turnout		18,581	54.3	+17.0
Registered electors		34,244		
National Liberal hold		Swing	−20.5	

UK General Election, 1923: Inverness
Party	Candidate	Votes	%	±%
Liberal	Murdoch Macdonald	10,194	65.4	+12.7
Labour	Andrew D. Kinloch	5,385	34.6	New
Majority		4,809	30.8	+25.4
Turnout		15,579	46.9	−7.4
Registered electors		33,230		
Liberal hold		Swing	+12.7	

UK General Election, 1924: Inverness
Party	Candidate	Votes	%	±%
Liberal	Murdoch Macdonald	11,468	62.6	−2.8
Labour	T. Henderson	6,863	37.4	+2.8
Majority		4,605	25.2	−5.6
Turnout		18,331	54.1	+7.2
Registered electors		33,875		
Liberal hold		Swing	+2.8	

UK General Election, 1929: Inverness
Party	Candidate	Votes	%	±%
Liberal	Murdoch Macdonald	14,042	55.3	−7.3
Labour	David Norman Mackay	11,369	44.7	+7.3
Majority		2,673	10.6	−14.6
Turnout		25,411	58.6	+4.5
Registered electors		43,387		
Liberal hold		Swing	−7.3	

=== Elections in the 1930s ===
UK General Election, 1931: Inverness
Party	Candidate	Votes	%	±%
Liberal National	Murdoch Macdonald	18,702	65.3	+10.0
Labour	David Norman Mackay	5,941	20.7	−24.0
National (Scotland)	John MacCormick	4,016	14.0	New
Majority		12,761	44.6	N/A
Turnout		28,659	61.9	+3.3
Liberal National gain from Liberal		Swing		

UK General Election, 1935: Inverness
Party	Candidate	Votes	%	±%
Liberal National	Murdoch Macdonald	14,985	56.4	−8.9
Labour	Hugh Fraser	7,297	27.5	+6.8
SNP	John MacCormick	4,273	16.1	+2.1
Majority		7,688	28.9	−15.7
Turnout		26,555	57.8	−4.1
Liberal National hold		Swing		

=== Elections in the 1940s ===
UK General Election, 1945: Inverness
Party	Candidate	Votes	%	±%
Independent Liberal	Murdoch Macdonald	12,090	43.26	−13.1
Labour	Neil George Maclean	9,655	34.55	+7.0
Liberal	John MacCormick	6,200	22.19	+6.1
Majority		2,435	8.71	N/A
Turnout		27,945	59.40	+1.6
Independent Liberal gain from Liberal National		Swing		

=== Elections in the 1950s ===
General election 1950: Inverness
Party	Candidate	Votes	%	±%
Unionist	Malcolm Douglas-Hamilton	16,056	45.47	New
Labour	Desmond Nethersole-Thompson	11,236	31.82	−2.73
Liberal	John Bannerman	8,023	22.72	+0.53
Majority		4,820	13.65	+4.94
Turnout		35,315	68.52	+9.12
Unionist gain from National Liberal		Swing		

General election 1951: Inverness
Party	Candidate	Votes	%	±%
Unionist	Malcolm Douglas-Hamilton	22,497	64.54	+19.07
Labour	Thomas Alexander MacNair	12,361	35.46	+3.64
Majority		10,136	29.08	+15.43
Turnout		34,858	69.30	+0.78
Unionist hold		Swing	+21.37	

1954 Inverness by-election
Party	Candidate	Votes	%	±%
Unionist	Neil McLean	10,329	41.4	−23.1
Liberal	John Bannerman	8,998	36.0	New
Labour	William Paterson	5,642	22.6	−12.9
Majority		1,331	5.4	−23.7
Turnout		24,969	49.2	−20.1
Unionist hold		Swing		

General election 1955: Inverness
Party	Candidate	Votes	%	±%
Unionist	Neil McLean	14,352	41.5	−23.0
Liberal	John Bannerman	13,386	38.7	N/A
Labour	Desmond Nethersole-Thompson	6,891	19.9	−15.6
Majority		966	2.8	−26.3
Turnout		34,629	67.49	−1.8
Unionist hold		Swing	−9.1	

General election 1959: Inverness
Party	Candidate	Votes	%	±%
Unionist	Neil McLean	15,728	44.4	+2.9
Liberal	John Bannerman	11,653	32.9	−5.8
Labour	Ian John Forgan Coulter	8,073	22.77	+2.9
Majority		4,075	11.49	+8.70
Turnout		35,454	71.56	+4.07
Unionist hold		Swing	+5.75	

=== Elections in the 1960s ===
General election 1964: Inverness
Party	Candidate	Votes	%	±%
Liberal	Russell Johnston	14,235	39.8	+6.9
Unionist	Neil McLean	12,099	33.9	−10.5
Labour	Allan Campbell McLean	9,402	26.3	+3.5
Majority		2,136	5.9	−5.6
Turnout		35,736	71.4	−0.2
Liberal gain from Unionist		Swing		

General election 1966: Inverness
Party	Candidate	Votes	%	±%
Liberal	Russell Johnston	14,356	39.4	−0.4
Conservative	David Anthony Wathen	11,961	32.9	−1.0
Labour	Allan Campbell McLean	10,069	27.7	+1.4
Majority		2,395	6.5	+0.6
Turnout		36,386	72.1	+0.7
Liberal hold		Swing		

=== Elections in the 1970s ===
General election 1970: Inverness
Party	Candidate	Votes	%	±%
Liberal	Russell Johnston	15,052	38.4	−1.0
Conservative	David Anthony Wathen	12,378	31.5	−1.4
Labour	Donald Macauley	9,038	23.0	−4.7
SNP	Athole Christina Cameron	2,781	7.1	New
Majority		2,674	6.9	+0.4
Turnout		39,248	72.3	+0.2
Liberal hold		Swing		

General election February 1974: Inverness
Party	Candidate	Votes	%	±%
Liberal	Russell Johnston	16,903	38.7	+0.3
Conservative	Robert Ewart Henderson	11,680	26.8	−4.7
SNP	Rob Gibson	7,816	17.9	+10.8
Labour	David James Cameron	7,258	16.6	−6.4
Majority		5,223	11.9	+5.0
Turnout		43,657	76.1	+3.8
Liberal hold		Swing		

General election October 1974: Inverness
Party	Candidate	Votes	%	±%
Liberal	Russell Johnston	13,128	32.4	−6.3
SNP	Donald Barr	11,994	29.6	+11.7
Conservative	Robert Ewart Henderson	8,922	22.0	−4.8
Labour	J.W.L. Cumming	6,332	15.6	−1.0
Fine Gael (Scotland)	Uilleam Bell	155	0.4	New
Majority		1,134	2.8	−9.1
Turnout		40,531	70.5	−5.6
Liberal hold		Swing		

General election 1979: Inverness
Party	Candidate	Votes	%	±%
Liberal	Russell Johnston	15,716	33.7	+1.3
Conservative	Richard Hunter Gordon	11,559	24.8	+2.8
SNP	Donald Barr	9,603	20.6	−9.0
Labour	Brian David Henderson Wilson	9,586	20.6	+5.0
Fine Gael (Scotland)	Uilleam Bell	112	0.2	−0.2
Majority		4,157	8.9	+6.1
Turnout		46,576	74.4	−4.1
Liberal hold		Swing		

== Notes and references ==
- Craig, F. W. S. (1983) [1969]. British parliamentary election results 1918-1949 (3rd ed.). Chichester: Parliamentary Research Services. ISBN 978-0-900178-06-1.
- Leigh Rayment's Historical List of MPs – Constituencies beginning with "I"
