= Thomas Morison, Lord Morison =

Scottish politician

Thomas Morison

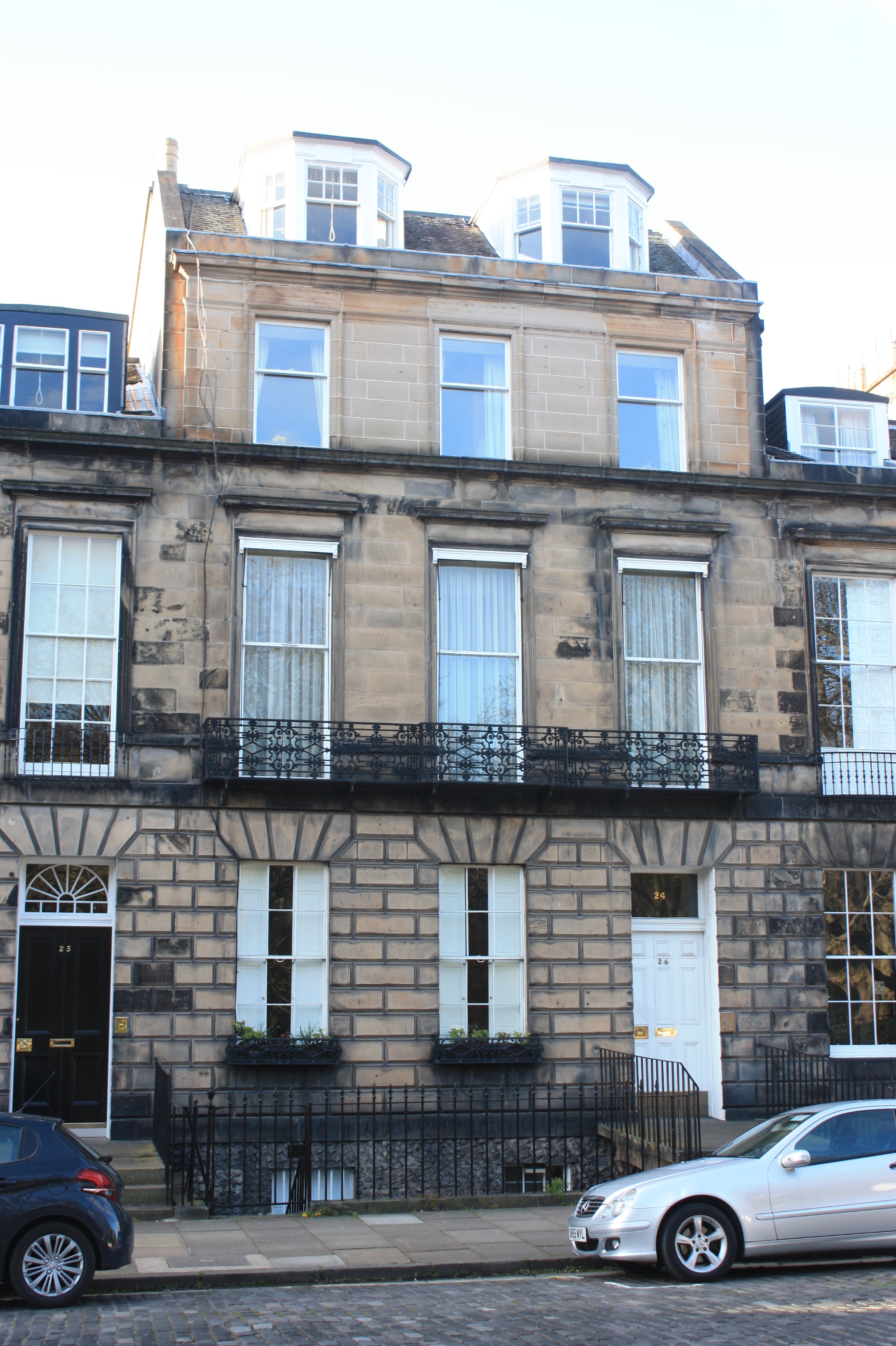
24 Heriot Row, Edinburgh

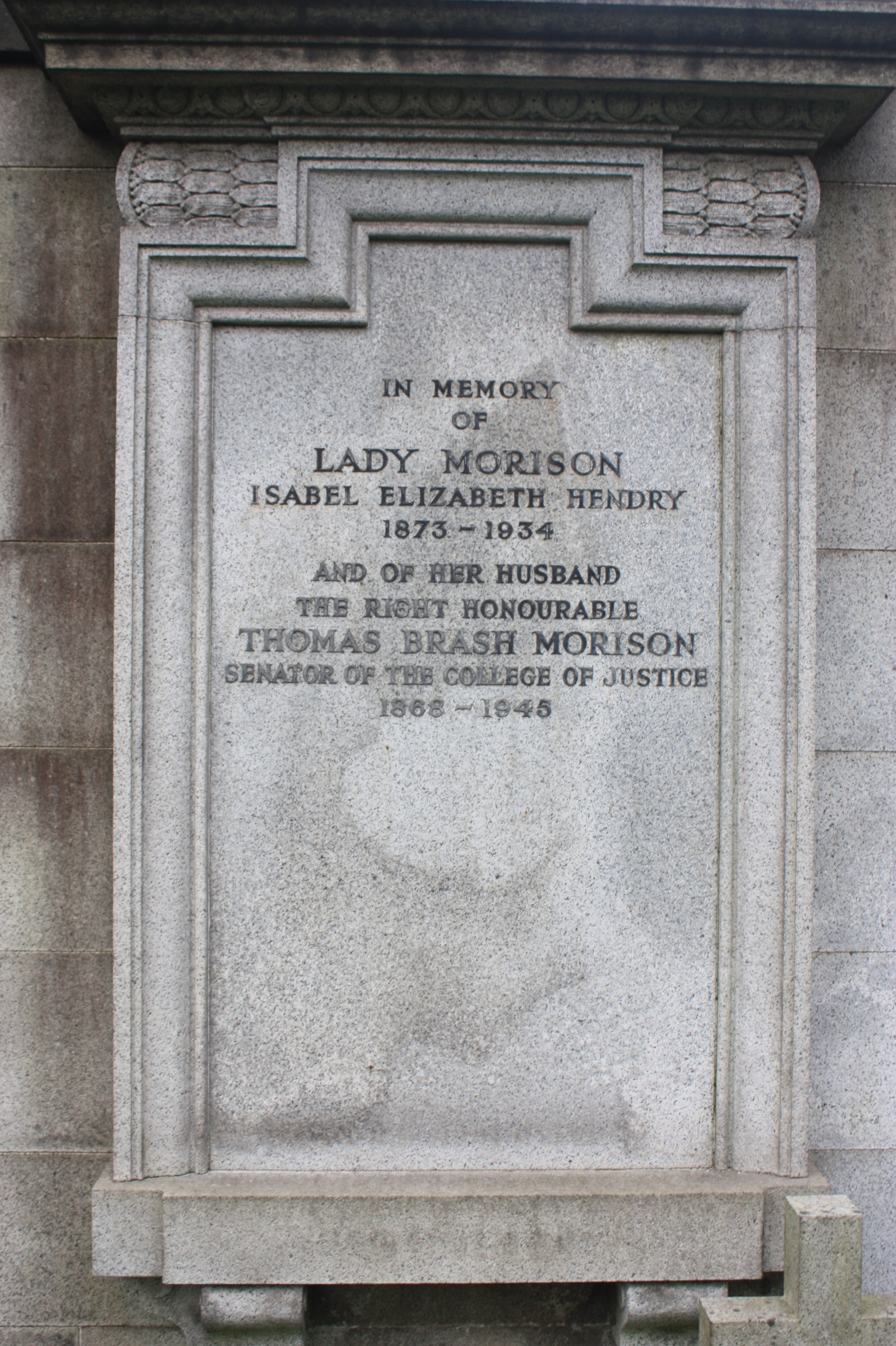
The grave of Thomas Brash Morison, Dean Cemetery

Thomas Brash Morison, Lord Morison (21 November 1868 – 28 July 1945) was a Scottish politician and judge. In March 1922 he was created a Senator of the College of Justice with the title of Lord Morison.

== Life ==
Morison was born in Edinburgh. He studied law at the University of Edinburgh where he obtained an MA and LLD. He was called to the bar in Scotland in 1891 and then in England in 1899. He took silk in October 1906.

He was knighted in 1906. He was senior Advocate-Depute, 1908–1910 and Deputy Chairman of the Fishery Board for Scotland, 1910–1913. During the same period he also held the post of Sheriff of Fife and Kinross. He was made a Bencher of Gray's Inn in 1920.

In Edinburgh he lived at 24 Heriot Row in the New Town.

Liberal Member of Parliament for Inverness-shire from 1917 to 1918 and for Inverness from 1918 to 1922, Morison was Solicitor General for Scotland in the Liberal and Coalition Governments from October 1913 to 1920. In 1920 he was appointed Privy Counsellor and promoted to Lord Advocate, a post he held until 1922. He resigned from the House of Commons on 27 February 1922 by accepting the office of Steward of the Chiltern Hundreds.

He is buried against the northern wall of the 20th extension to Dean Cemetery in western Edinburgh with his wife, Isabel Elizabeth Hendry, Lady Morison (1873–1934).

== Family ==
He married twice, firstly to Isabel Elizabeth Hendry secondly to Georgina Morgan Mitchell.

His children included Harold Thomas Brash Morison. A son was the noted lawyer Sir Ronald Peter Morison QC, whose son Malcolm Morison, Lord Morison also became a Senator of the College of Justice.

Parliament of the United Kingdom
Preceded by John Dewar	Member of Parliament for Inverness-shire; 1917–1918	constituency abolished
New constituency	Member of Parliament for Inverness; 1918–1922	Succeeded by Sir Murdoch Macdonald
Legal offices
Preceded by Andrew Anderson	Solicitor General for Scotland; 1913–1920	Succeeded by Charles Murray
Preceded by James Clyde	Lord Advocate; 1920–1922	Succeeded by Charles Murray
