= Karen Polle =

Japanese showjumping rider

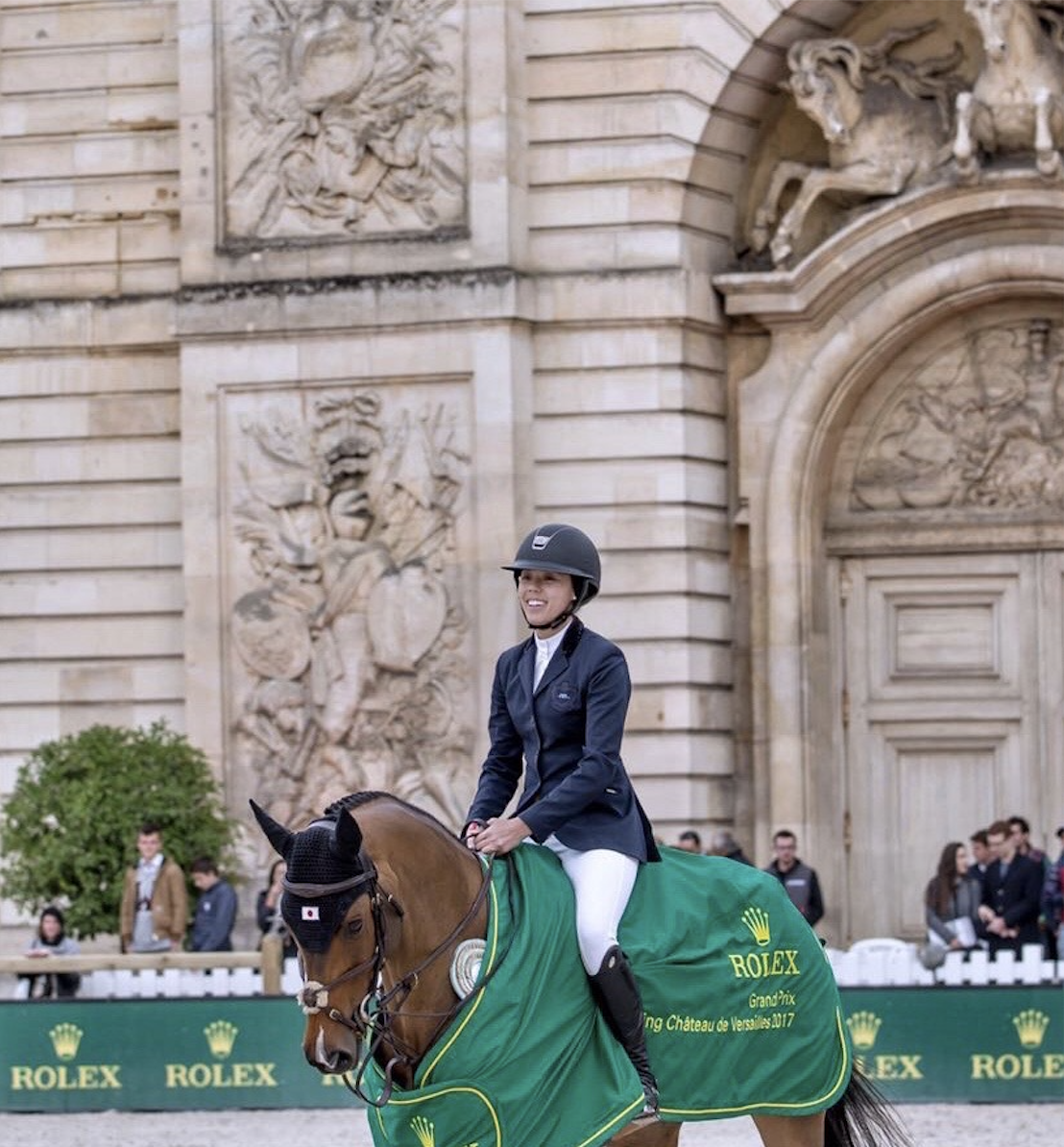
- Karen Polle and her horse With Wings at Jumping Chateau de Versailles 2017
- Born: Tokyo, Japan
- Education: Yale University
- Occupation: Equestrian

Karen Polle is a Japanese equestrian athlete competing in showjumping. She is a member of the Japanese National Showjumping Team and is the top-ranked Asian rider in the world. In September 2018, Polle competed in her first championship at the FEI World Equestrian Games in Tryon, North Carolina, where she was an Individual Finalist with her horse With Wings. She was one of the youngest athletes competing at the championship. She is a member of the Rolex Young Riders Academy, whose mission is to support some of the most promising up-and-coming riders in the sport. Polle is a Hermès Partner Rider, and is currently the brand's only Asian Partner Rider. She is a Kinoshita Group Sports athlete and is a Brand Ambassador for Japanese jewelry company Mikimoto.

== Personal life ==
Polle was born in Tokyo, Japan, and grew up in New York City. She attended the Spence School from K-12. She then attended Yale University, graduating with a degree in Economics. She is currently a student at Stanford Graduate School of Business.
