= Nathaniel B. Wales =

American inventor

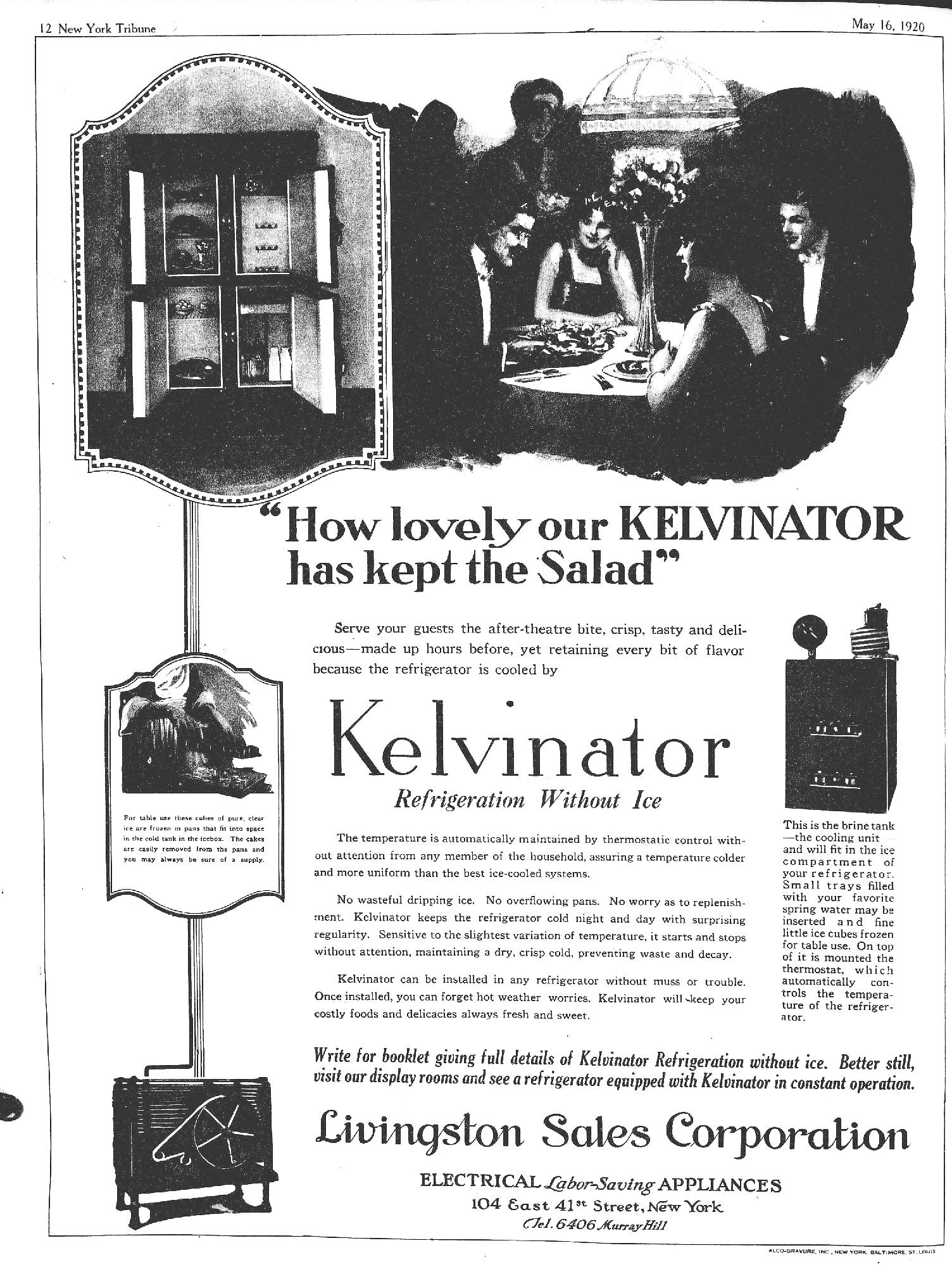
1920 newspaper ad featuring Wales' Kelvinator refrigerator

Nathaniel Brackett Wales (11 July 1883, Braintree, Massachusetts – November 15, 1974) was an American inventor credited with early patents on refrigerators, washers, vacuum cleaners, and co-inventor with his son of the proximity detonator used in bombs in World War II.

Wales graduated from Harvard College in 1905. He was the founder of the Kelvinator home appliance company in Detroit, Michigan in 1914.

In 1908 in Bridgewater, Massachusetts, Nathaniel B. Wales, Sr. married Enid Mariner Scarritt (1889-1972). They had two children and were divorced in July 1923. In 1928, he married Mary van Wagenen Terry. His final wife was Madge Mariner (1885-1978).

His daughter Natalie Scarritt Wales (1909-2013), best known as Lady Natalie Malcolm Douglas-Hamilton, was a socialite and philanthropist known for organizing the "Bundles for Britain" campaign during World War II. His son Nathaniel Brackett Wales, Jr. (1915–1969) graduated from Harvard College in 1937. He was a physicist and inventor with over 75 patents.
