= Frances Baldwin =

American artist (born 1907)

- Born: Frances Sanborn Baldwin; October 18, 1907; San Francisco, California, U.S.
- Died: August 7, 1999 (aged 91); San Francisco, California, U.S.
- Education: Art Students League of New York; San Francisco Art Institute; Mills College
- Known for: Painting

Frances Sanborn Baldwin (1907–1999) was an American painter and a descendant of a pioneer California family.

== Early life and education ==
Frances Baldwin was born in San Francisco, California in 1907. Her father was attorney Alexander Richards Baldwin, he was also the former president of the Western Pacific Railroad. Her grandfather was John R. Glascock. Baldwin was raised in Woodside, California on the family estate.

She moved to New York City and went to the Spence School as a child. Baldwin studied at the Art Students League of New York, and while there, she studied under Yasuo Kuniyoshi. She proceeded to study at Mills College with Fernand Léger. She then returned to San Francisco to study at the California School of Fine Arts. There, she studied with Mark Rothko and Maurice Sterne.

She served in the WAVES during World War II. She served as a pharmacist's aide in Oakland, California.

== Mid-life and career ==
Baldwin traveled to China, India and Taiwan. She became one of the first docents at the Asian Art Museum, serving for over 20 years. From 1951-52 she served as the president of the Association of San Francisco Women Artists. She served on the board of directors for the California School of Fine Arts from 1957 to 1960.

== Later life and legacy ==
She died in San Francisco in 1999.

== Work ==
Baldwin painted small oil paintings and was inspired by Asian art. The San Francisco Chronicle called her an "expert" in the subject of Asian art. She shared her knowledge with students at the San Francisco Art Institute and with the public as a docent at the Asian Art Museum.

== Collections ==
- "Fisherman's Lunch", ca. 1940, pen and ink, watercolor and pencil on paper, Smithsonian American Art Museum
