= Malcolm Morison, Lord Morison =

Scottish lawyer and judge

Alastair Malcolm Morison, Lord Morison (12 February 1931 – 31 July 2005) was a Scottish lawyer and judge. He was a Senator of the College of Justice in Scotland from 1985 to 1997.

== Biography ==
The son of Sir Ronald Peter Morison QC and the grandson of Thomas Morison, Lord Morison, Malcolm Morison was educated at Cargilfield School, Winchester College, and the University of Edinburgh. He was admitted to the Faculty of Advocates in 1956 and devilled to George Emslie, later Lord Emslie. At the bar, he was nicknamed "tiger" for his fierce advocacy. He became a Queen's Counsel in 1968.

Morison became a Senator of the College of Justice in 1985, taking the same judicial title as his grandfather. As a judge, he was often critical of the Scottish Executive. He retired in 1997.

After his retirement, Lord Morison continued to sit in the High Court and the Court of Session as a retired judge until 2004, when he resigned in protest against the increased use of temporary judges, arguing that the practice undermined the independence of the judiciary. He also complained about the difficulty of claiming payment for his expenses.

Lord Morison died of cancer a year later, in 2005.
