= Thomas Nicholas Redington =

Irish administrator, politician and civil servant

Sir Thomas Nicholas Redington KCB (2 October 1815 – 11 October 1862) was an Irish administrator, politician and civil servant.

Redington, the only son of Christopher Talbot Redington (1780–1825), a captain in the army, by Frances, only daughter of Henry Dowell of Cadiz, was born at Kilcornan, Clarenbridge, County Galway. He was educated at Oscott College and at Christ's College, Cambridge, but as a Roman Catholic was not eligible to graduate with a degree. Devoting himself to politics, he succeeded William Sharman Crawford as the Member of Parliament for Dundalk, serving in the Whig interest from 1837 to 1846.

On 11 July 1846, he was appointed under-secretary of state for Ireland, in 1847 a commissioner of national education, and ex officio an Irish poor-law commissioner. As a member of Sir John Burgoyne's relief commission in 1847 he rendered much active service during the famine, and in consequence of his services he was on 28 Aug. 1849 nominated a knight-commander of the civil division of the Bath, soon after Queen Victoria's first visit to Ireland. He served as secretary to the board of control from December 1852 to 1856, when he accepted the post of commissioner of inquiry respecting lunatic asylums in Ireland.

On 30 August 1842, he married Anne Eliza Mary, eldest daughter and coheiress of John Hyacinth Talbot, M.P., of Talbot Hall, County Wexford. He resided at Kilcornan House, but he died in London on 11 October 1862 aged 47.

Parliament of the United Kingdom
Preceded by William Sharman Crawford	Member of Parliament for Dundalk; 1837–1846	Succeeded by Daniel O'Connell Jnr
Political offices
Preceded by Charles Bruce; Henry Baillie	Joint Secretary to the Board of Control; 1852–1856	Succeeded by Post becomes non-political
