= 1922 Inverness by-election =

UK parliamentary by-election

| ← 1918 | 16 March 1922 | 1922 → |

Constituency of Inverness
- Registered: 29,263
- Turnout: 50.1% (▲12.8%)

| Candidate | Murdoch Macdonald | Alexander Livingstone |
| Party | Liberal | Independent Liberal |
| Alliance | Coalition |
| Popular vote | 8,340 | 8,024 |
| Percentage | 51.0% | 49.0% |
MP before election
Morison
Liberal
Subsequent MP
MacDonald
National Liberal

The 1922 Inverness by-election was a by-election held on 16 March 1922 for the British House of Commons constituency of Inverness.

== Vacancy ==
The by-election was caused by the resignation of the sitting Coalition Liberal Member of Parliament (MP) Rt Hon. Sir Thomas Brash Morison, upon his appointment as a Senator of the College of Justice. Morison had held the seat since 1917.

== Electoral history ==
At the last general election, the Liberal candidate, Sir Thomas Morison was elected with the endorsement of the Coalition Government.

Morison

General election, 1918: Inverness
| Party | | Candidate | Votes | % | ±% |
|---|---|---|---|---|---|
| C | Liberal | Thomas Brash Morison | 7,991 | 73.2 | N/A |
| | Highland Land League | George James Bruce | 2,930 | 26.8 | N/A |
| Majority | | | 5,061 | 46.4 | N/A |
| Turnout | | | 10,921 | 37.3 | N/A |
| Registered electors | | | 29,263 | | |
| | Liberal win (new seat) | | | | |
C indicates candidate endorsed by the coalition government.

== Candidates ==
The Inverness Liberal Association chose as their candidate to defend the seat, Sir Murdoch Macdonald. Macdonald was a supporter of the Coalition Government and received the additional support of the Inverness Unionist Association. The Scottish Liberal Federation, who were opposed to the Coalition Government, organised support for Mackenzie Livingstone, who was adopted as an Independent Liberal candidate.

== Result ==
The result was a victory for the Coalition Liberal candidate.

By-election 1922: Inverness
| Party | | Candidate | Votes | % | ±% |
|---|---|---|---|---|---|
| C | Liberal | Murdoch Macdonald | 8,340 | 51.0 | −22.2 |
| | Independent Liberal | Alexander Livingstone | 8,024 | 49.0 | New |
| Majority | | | 316 | 2.0 | −44.4 |
| Turnout | | | 16,364 | 50.1 | +13.8 |
| Registered electors | | | 32,695 | | |
| | Liberal hold | | Swing | -22.2 | |
C indicates candidate endorsed by the coalition government.

== Aftermath ==
General election, 1922: Inverness
| Party | Candidate | Votes | % | ±% |
|---|---|---|---|---|
| National Liberal | Murdoch Macdonald | 9,796 | 52.7 | +1.7 |
| Liberal | Alexander Livingstone | 8,785 | 47.3 | −1.7 |
| Majority | | 1,011 | 5.4 | +3.4 |
| Turnout | | 18,581 | 54.3 | +4.2 |
| Registered electors | | 34,244 | | |
| National Liberal hold | | Swing | +1.7 | |

Sir Murdoch Macdonald held the seat until he retired in 1950 aged 83.
