= Murdoch Macdonald =

British politician (1866–1957)

Macdonald pictured in 1922

Sir Murdoch MacDonald KCMG CB (6 May 1866 – 24 April 1957) was a notable Scottish civil engineer and British politician. Born in Inverness, and educated at the Farraline Park Institution there, he would serve later as the constituency's MP from 1922 until 1950.

A civil engineer by profession starting in 1890, MacDonald would work in British Egypt from 1898 to 1921. He established the firm of consulting engineers which eventually practised under the name of Sir M MacDonald & Partners from 1927. In 1932, he became President of the Institution of Civil Engineers.

== Engineering career ==
MacDonald served his apprenticeship as an engineer with the former Highland Railway Company, and following its completion he spent some years as an assistant engineer on various railway construction projects in Northern Scotland. Among them, there was the building of the Black Isle line between 1890 and 1894, and the widening of the main line between Dalnaspidal and Blair Athol. Years later, MacDonald noted that his early railway work included the design and construction of a small earthen dam and hydroelectric plant.

In 1898, he was invited by Benjamin Baker to go to Egypt as assistant engineer to Maurice Fitzmaurice, the resident engineer in charge of constructing the first Aswan Dam. MacDonald's appointment as an assistant engineer during the building of this significant structure marked the beginning of a 23-year term of service in Egypt. During the same dam's first heightening between 1908 and 1912, MacDonald was director-general of irrigation for the Egyptian Government. He subsequently became Under Secretary of State for Public Works, and finally adviser to Egypt's Minister of Public Works.

For most of his years in Egypt, MacDonald's principal work was with the Aswan Low Dam and its first heightening. The initial dam provided storage capacity above the Nile's natural flow, for Egyptian agriculture requirements, and was capable of holding a summer water supply for lands reasonably expected to be converted to summer irrigation in the immediate future. By 1905 however, it appeared that Egypt was experiencing a cycle of low years in regard to the volume of water passing down the river during the summer. The Government was thus very soon faced with the problem of finding additional storage room to meet possible demands for the existing area, as well as making adequate provision for future extension. A scheme for thickening and heightening the existing Aswan Dam was prepared by Benjamin Baker, and a great deal of the work involved was undertaken by MacDonald. The project was brought to fulfillment principally under his direction, with the "first heightening" completed in 1912.

There were, however, several other projects initiated by Sir Murdoch during his years of service with the Egyptian Government. He was responsible for the planning and completion of overall drainage schemes for lower Egypt which finally dealt with about 3,000,000 acres. He also designed the Sennar Dam on the Blue Nile, and put into operation the first stages of the Gezira irrigation schemes for the conversion of virgin land in the Sudan for cotton growing.

MacDonald worked on the initial siting and design of Gebel Aulia Dam, which was built upstream in the Sudan, but also provided 4 billion cubic metres of regulated storage annually for irrigation downstream in Egypt. He designed and constructed the head works of the Menufia Canal, downstream of the Delta Barrage, the Esna Barrage downstream of Aswan, and effected large-scale improvements to Alexandria Harbour. But even in the 1910s, the propagation of many of these schemes for the development of Egypt aroused much controversy. One expert commission after another was set up to examine the projects and investigate the criticisms of them, and it was in this connection that MacDonald prepared a detailed report entitled Nile Control, which is looked upon as an early valuable guide to the effective water resource management of the Nile.

Following his departure from Egyptian service and starting Sir M. MacDonald & Partners, he continued his work on Egyptian irrigation schemes. The firm was invited to submit proposals for a second heightening of the Aswan Dam, and the work was carried out between 1929 and 1933. About the same time, MacDonald was responsible for work undertaken to strengthen the Esna Barrage, and he advised on various schemes for land drainage and irrigation in Greece and Portugal. After World War II, he was again consulted by the Government of Egypt about the Aswan Dam, and submitted a report advising that a third heightening was practicable, though never carried out.

Between 1951 and 1953, he was engaged on the design of four new schemes, for the Egyptian Government, involving barrages and storage reservoirs on the Nile. Despite advancing years, he twice visited Egypt to discuss these works.

MacDonalds's principal work in his later years also included domestic projects associated with some of the North of Scotland Hydro-Electric Board's schemes, and with the Great Ouse flood protection scheme. The latter was first considered early in 1938 following serious flooding in the Fens. Several proposals were put forward, and he was asked to formulate a protection scheme in conjunction with the River Great Ouse Catchment Board. Detailed surveys were made to determine the practicability of the works involved, and a report dealing with the whole problem was presented to the Board. The report was printed in early March 1941, but its construction was delayed by the war and until further serious flooding emphasised its urgency. In the mid-1950s the work was started in earnest under the direction of MacDonalds's firm, but he would not see its completion.

In addition to project work over his long civil engineering career, MacDonald gave his services to other spheres. He was elected an associate member of the Institution of Civil Engineers in 1892, and became a full member in 1909. He presented two papers to the Institution dealing with various aspects of the work on the Aswan Dam, and was twice awarded the Telford Gold Medal. He became president of the Institution in 1932.

He was created a Knight Commander of the Order of St Michael and St George (KCMG) in 1914, and was appointed a Companion of the Order of the Bath (CB) in 1917. For his service during the construction of the initial Aswan Low Dam he in 1902 received the 3rd class of the Ottoman Order of the Medjidie from the Khedive of Egypt.

== Political career ==
MacDonald was elected as a Liberal Party Member of Parliament (MP) for Inverness in 1922. He joined the Liberal National Party split in 1931, but resigned from the Liberal National group in the House of Commons in 1942 and according to some descriptions stood as an Independent Liberal MP at the 1945 general election. However Who was Who, The Times and Whitaker's Almanack all show Macdonald with the description Liberal National in 1945. At his last election, he became the House's oldest MP. He remained a member of his constituency association, which was aligned with the National Liberals. He sat until he retired as the oldest MP in 1950, at age 83.

He died, aged 90, in 1957.

== Notes ==
Parliament of the United Kingdom
Preceded by Thomas Morison	Member of Parliament for Inverness; 1922–1950	Succeeded by Malcolm Douglas-Hamilton
Preceded by Will Thorne	Oldest sitting member (nb not Father of the House); 1945 – 1950	Succeeded by David Logan
Professional and academic associations
Preceded by Cyril Kirkpatrick	President of the Institution of Civil Engineers; November 1932 – November 1933	Succeeded by Henry Maybury
