= Billy McLean (politician) =

British Army officer and politician (1918–1986)

Lieutenant-Colonel Billy McLean

Member of Parliament for Inverness
- In office 21 December 1954 – 25 September 1964
- Preceded by: Malcolm Douglas-Hamilton
- Succeeded by: Russell Johnston

Personal details
- Born: Neil Loudon Desmond McLean; 28 November 1918 Sutherland, Scotland
- Died: 17 November 1986 (aged 67) London, England
- Spouse: Daška Ivanović
- Awards: DSO and Two Bars; Distinguished Military Medal of Haile Selassie I General Service Medal GVI 1 General Service Medal, Palestine 1945-48 and Bar

Military service
- Allegiance: United Kingdom
- Branch/service: British Army
- Rank: Lieutenant-Colonel
- Unit: Royal Scots Greys; Special Operations Executive
- Commands: Gideon Force, Ethiopia; 1st Partisan Brigade, Albania
- Battles/wars: Arab revolt in Palestine; World War II; Albanian Subversion

Lieutenant-Colonel Neil Loudon Desmond McLean, DSO** (28 November 1918 – 17 November 1986), known as Billy McLean, was a Scottish politician and intelligence officer in the British Army. During World War II, he worked for Special Operations Executive and was involved in clandestine missions in Ethiopia, China, and particularly Albania. In 1954 he served as a Unionist Member of Parliament for Inverness.

== Family and education ==
McLean was born in Sutherland, the elder son of Neil Gillean McLean, who had made a great deal of money trading with India and owned an estate at Glencalvie. The family called him "Billy". He was educated at Eton College, where he excelled in fencing, becoming Captain of the school team. He was then sent to the Royal Military College, Sandhurst to train to become an officer. Having spent his holiday periods fox hunting, he was a keen sportsman and won many point to point races while attending Sandhurst.

== WWII and Army service ==
In August 1938 on leaving Sandhurst, McLean was commissioned into the Royal Scots Greys. The following year he was posted to Palestine and spent the first two years of the Second World War there. In 1941, he was transferred to the Special Operations Executive, an unorthodox military unit which worked behind enemy lines on sabotage and espionage. After completing his training he was sent to join Col. Wingate's Gideon Force in Ethiopia, where he commanded a mixed group of Ethiopian and Eritrean irregulars (nicknamed "McLean's Foot") against the occupying Italian army. For his efforts he was awarded the Distinguished Military Medal of Haile Selassie I in 1941. 1942 saw McLean shifted to a staff job with the Special Operations Executive (SOE); first in Cairo, Egypt then in Syria and back in Palestine. He also worked for MI9 in Istanbul aiding resistance fighters in Nazi-occupied countries.

== Albanian missions ==
In early 1943 McLean was selected by SOE to lead a mission in occupied Albania, for which he was promoted to major. His team was parachuted behind enemy lines in April 1943, where they made contact with the partisan National Liberation Movement (LANÇ) and the nationalist, anti-Communist, anti-Zog movement, the Balli Kombëtar. McLean then organized them into the 1st Partisan Brigade, and arranged their training and armament. Following his evacuation from Albania in November 1943, McLean was awarded the Distinguished Service Order and promoted to lieutenant colonel. However, even after he left tension between the partisans and the nationalists in Albania was still causing concern to SOE at which point the Foreign Office and McLean devised a plan to unite them in a common struggle against the Axis forces there. In April 1944, exactly one year later, McLean returned to Albania with a small team known as "The Musketeers" which included Major David Smiley and Captain Julian Amery. Unfortunately they could not persuade the nationalists to join with the partisans; nor could McLean get SOE-HQ in Bari to support his nominee to lead the partisan fight against the Axis powers, Abaz Kupi. Meanwhile, the partisans grew suspicious of this outside interference, and eventually McLean and his team had to be withdrawn. Ironically, British strategy was subsequently altered to recognize only the LANÇ who went on to convert Albania into a Communist state.

== Post-war ==
Early in 1945 McLean volunteered to work for SOE against the Japanese forces in China and was appointed military advisor to Sir Clarmont Skrine, the British consul in Kashgar. He was still working undercover there when the war ended. After some years traveling in the late 1940s, McLean resigned his commission and returned to Albania one last time, joining a clandestine organization operated by the United States and British intelligence agencies to undermine Enver Hoxha and the Communist government there. In 1949 he married Daška Ivanović, from Dubrovnik in Croatia. Coincidentally his new brother-in-law, diplomat Vane Ivanovic, had been a member of the Yugoslav section of the Political Warfare Executive (PWE), the propaganda arm of SOE, during the war.

== Entry to politics ==
At the 1950 general election, McLean ran as the Conservative Party candidate for Preston South, a newly created constituency which was expected to be marginal. He was defeated by 149 votes. He stood again in the 1951 general election, but was again defeated by the extremely narrow margin of 16 votes. This was the smallest majority in any constituency in that election. In the summer of 1952, McLean was chosen as the Unionist Party candidate for Inverness, where the sitting Member of Parliament Lord Malcolm Douglas-Hamilton intended to stand down. He toured the constituency continuously, familiarizing himself with its problems and speaking to local groups.

Lord Malcolm resigned in autumn 1954 and a by-election was called for 21 December. The Liberal Party was strong in the constituency and campaigned against the practice of "plural farming" by which landowners farmed multiple farms with a single labour force, and which was unpopular with agricultural workers. McLean's work in nursing the constituency paid off as he was elected by 1,331 votes.

Owing to illness, McLean did not make his maiden speech until March 1956, and he chose to speak about Egypt and Gamal Abdel Nasser whom he regarded with extreme concern. McLean was a strong supporter of the decision to invade Egypt during the Suez Crisis, and an equally strong opponent of the decision shortly thereafter to withdraw. The Members of Parliament who took this view were known as the "Suez Group"; McLean did not join those who abandoned the Conservative whip in 1957, but did declare that he was in sympathy with them and that "the M.P.s who have resigned have raised the flag for many of us who have not resigned". In general McLean's Parliamentary contributions were concentrated on foreign affairs.

He also visited areas of concern, including French Indochina and Algeria to find the situation on the ground, and reported back to British newspapers. In September 1962 while visiting Algeria he was pinned down for an hour by a firefight between rival groups. That year he also began to work with Muhammad al-Badr in resisting Egyptian efforts to install an ally as President of North Yemen where he became the principal military advisor to the Royalist forces. He persuaded the Foreign Office not to recognize the Communist-backed government in the country; an accomplishment described by McLean's biographer Xan Fielding as his "crowning achievement". In June 1964 McLean introduced a Private members bill aimed at protecting some paper mills, shipbuilding and cotton firms which had received government grants from nationalization. During the 1964 general election he found himself under severe pressure from the Liberal Party and ended up losing his seat.

== Final years ==
Being out of Parliament left McLean more time to travel, especially in the Middle East. He kept up his work in Yemen, and had contacts with most of the Muslim Arab states including Jordan where he had developed a close relationship with then monarch King Hussein. Fielding claimed that he was a kind of "unofficial under-secretary" of the Foreign Office, and quoted a 1979 letter from Harold Macmillan which said "You are one of those people whose services to our dear country are known only to a few". In his retirement he was appointed to the Royal Company of Archers, the Queen's bodyguard in Scotland.

McLean suffered from diabetes and septicaemia and died of heart failure in 1986. At his side were his family, including his step-grandson, the actor Cary Elwes. All of his diaries, notes and orders kept meticulously from all his campaigns now reside in the Imperial War Museum.

== Literature ==
- Xan Fielding. One Man in His Time: The life of Lieutenant-Colonel NLD ('Billy') McLean, DSO, London: Macmillan; 1st Edition (1 November 1990)

== See also ==
- David Smiley
- Julian Amery
- Xan Fielding
- Sophie Moss

Parliament of the United Kingdom
Preceded by Lord Malcolm Douglas-Hamilton	Member of Parliament for Inverness; 1954–1964	Succeeded by Russell Johnston
