= Cyprus Regiment =

Military unit of the British Army during WWII

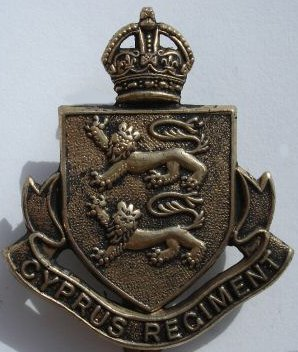
- Cap badge of the Cyprus Regiment
- Active: 1940–1950
- Disbanded: 1950
- Country: British Cyprus
- Allegiance: United Kingdom
- Branch: British Army
- Type: Infantry
- Size: 30,000
- Engagements: World War II: Western Front; Battle of France; Mediterranean and Middle East Theatre; Battle of Greece; North African Campaign; Operation Compass; Italian Campaign; Allied Invasion of Italy; Palestine Emergency

The Cyprus Regiment was a military unit of the British Army. Created by the British Government during World War II, it was made up of volunteers from the Greek Cypriot, Turkish Cypriot, Armenian, Maronite and Latin inhabitants of Cyprus, but also included other Commonwealth nationalities.

The badge of the Cyprus Regiment was a shield charged with two lions passant guardant in pale and ensigned with the Imperial Crown and below the shield was a scroll bearing the title of the regiment.

== Service history ==
The Cyprus Regiment was founded on 12 April 1940. It included Infantry, Mechanical, Transport and Pack Transport Companies. Cypriot mule drivers were the first colonial troops sent to the Western Front. They served in France, Ethiopia, Palestine, and Italy carrying equipment to areas inaccessible to vehicles. They were used to supply and support other troops at Monte Cassino.

On a brief visit to Cyprus in 1943, Winston Churchill praised the "soldiers of the Cyprus Regiment who have served honourably on many fields from Libya to Dunkirk."

About 30,000 Cypriots served in the Cyprus Regiment. The regiment was involved in action from the very start and served in the Battle of France, in the Greek Campaign (the Battle of Greece, in which about 600 soldiers were captured at Kalamata, in 1941), North Africa (Operation Compass), France, the Middle East and Italy. Many soldiers were taken prisoner especially at the beginning of the war and were interned in various POW camps, including Stalag VIII-B Lamsdorf, Stalag IV-C at Wistritz near Teplitz (now in the Czech Republic), and Stalag IV-B near Dresden. The soldiers captured in Kalamata were transported by train to prisoner of war camps.

In the post-war years the regiment served in Cyprus and the Middle East, including Palestine during the 1945-1948 period. The regiment was disbanded on 31 March 1950.

== Sources ==
- Panyiotou, Nicos. Cyprus' participation in World War II. Nicosia : Theopres Press Ltd., 1985.
- 50th anniversary of The Cyprus Regiment, 1939-1945. Nicosia : Republic of Cyprus Press & Information Office, 1990
- London Gazette : Operations in the Middle East from August, 1939 to November, 1940 (Publication date: 11 June 1946 Supplement: 37609 Page: 2997) (
- Jackson, Ashley. The British Empire and the Second World War
- The Commonwealth War Graves Commission
