= RAF Winkleigh =

Former Royal Air Force station in Devon, England

RAF Winkleigh USAAF Station 460
- Near Winkleigh, Devon in England

Site information
- Type: Royal Air Force satellite station
- Code: WK
- Owner: Air Ministry
- Operator: Royal Air Force; United States Army Air Forces; 1943-44
- Controlled by: RAF Fighter Command * No. 10 Group RAF; 1943 & 1944; Ninth Air Force; RAF Flying Training Command * No. 23 Group RAF; 1944-

Location
- Shown within Devon RAF Winkleigh (the United Kingdom)
- Coordinates: 50°52′04″N 003°57′34″W

Site history
- Built: 1942/43
- In use: January 1943 - December 1958
- Battles/wars: European theatre of World War II

Airfield information
- Elevation: 165 metres (541 ft) AMSL
Runways
Direction	Length and surface
00/00	Concrete/Tarmac
00/00	Concrete/Tarmac

Royal Air Force Winkleigh, or more simply RAF Winkleigh, is a former Royal Air Force satellite station located near to Winkleigh, Devon and south of Barnstaple, Devon, England.

The following units were here at some point:

- A detachment No. 161 Squadron RAF (September 1943 - September 1944) with the Westland Lysander
- A detachment of No. 286 Squadron RAF (1942-) with the Hawker Hurricane IIC
- No. 406 Squadron RCAF (April - September 1944) with Bristol Beaufighter and de Havilland Mosquito XII & XXX
- No. 415 Squadron RCAF (1943-44) with the Fairey Albacore
- Norwegian Training Base between December 1944 and November 1945 with North American Harvards, Airspeed Oxfords and Fairchild PT-19 Cornells
