= Russell Johnston =

British politician (1932–2008)

The Right Honourable The Lord Russell-Johnston
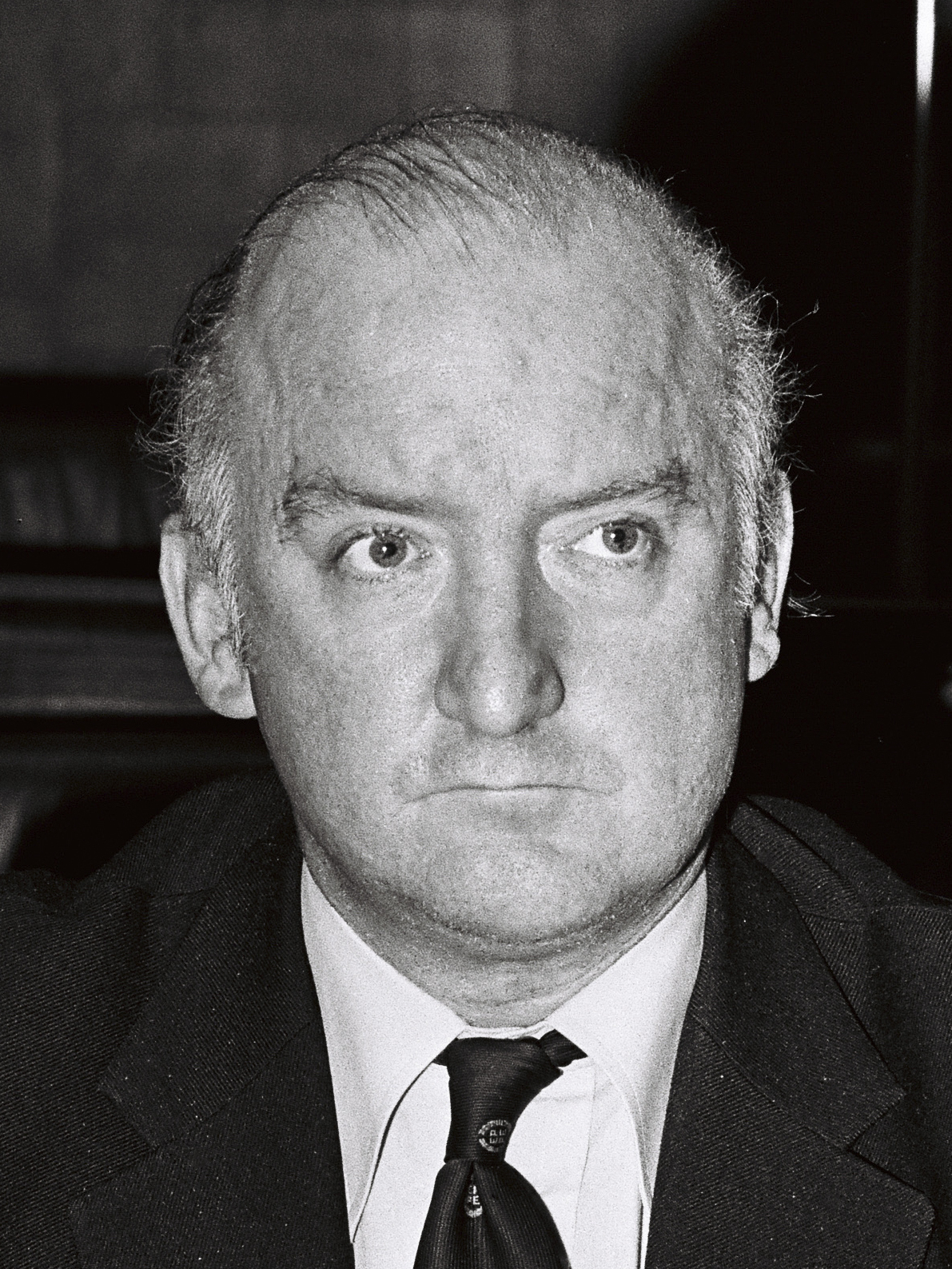
- Johnston in 1976

President of the Parliamentary Assembly of the Council of Europe
- In office 25 January 1999 – 20 January 2002
- Preceded by: Leni Fischer
- Succeeded by: Peter Schieder

Deputy Leader of the Liberal Democrats
- In office 16 July 1988 – 13 April 1992
- Leader: Paddy Ashdown
- Preceded by: Alan Beith (Liberal Party)
- Succeeded by: Alan Beith

Member of Parliament for Inverness, Nairn and Lochaber Inverness (1964–1983)
- In office 15 October 1964 – 8 April 1997
- Preceded by: Neil McLean
- Succeeded by: Constituency abolished

Member of the House of Lords
- Lord Temporal
- Life peerage 21 July 1997 – 27 July 2008

Personal details
- Born: David Russell Johnston; 28 July 1932 Edinburgh, Scotland
- Died: 27 July 2008 (aged 75) Paris, France
- Party: Scottish Liberal Democrats (1988–2008); Scottish Liberal Party (before 1988)

David Russell Russell-Johnston, Baron Russell-Johnston (born David Russell Johnston; 28 July 1932 – 27 July 2008), usually known as Russell Johnston, was a leading Scottish Liberal Democrat politician and was the Leader of the Scottish Liberal Party from 1974 to 1988.

== Early life ==
David Russell Johnston was born on 28 July 1932 at 39 Palmerston Place, Edinburgh to Georgina Margaret Gerrie (née Russell) and David Knox Johnston, a customs and excise officer. He was educated at Portree High School on the Isle of Skye, and attended the University of Edinburgh, graduating in 1957 with an MA in history. After completing national service in the intelligence corps (1958–9) he trained as a teacher at Moray House College of Education, going on to teach at Liberton High School.

In 1961, he won The Observer Mace, speaking with David Harcus and representing the University of Edinburgh.

== Political career ==
He was elected to the House of Commons and represented Inverness (1964–83) and its successor seat Inverness, Nairn and Lochaber (1983–97) as a Member of Parliament (MP) for the Liberal Party (1964–88) and then the Liberal Democrats (1988–97). He also served as leader of the Scottish Liberal Party (1974–88) and as deputy leader of the Liberal Democrats (1988–92). In October 1966, he proposed a bill of federal law in order to deal with the Scotland and Wales case.

Johnston was knighted in 1985.

In the 1992 election, he made history by holding his seat with just 26% of the vote in a close four-way battle with Labour, the SNP, and the Conservatives. At the time, this was the lowest ever winning percentage for a candidate, until being superseded by Belfast South at the 2015 election. On retiring from the House of Commons in 1997, he was created a life peer as Baron Russell-Johnston of Minginish in Highlands, changing his surname by deed poll to allow his forename to be incorporated into his title.

He was a member of the Parliamentary Assembly of the Council of Europe from 1985 to his death in 2008, leading the Alliance of Liberals and Democrats for Europe (ALDE-PACE) from 1994 to 1999, and serving as the assembly's president from 1999 until 2002. In 2003 Alija Izetbegović described him as "a great friend of Bosnia."

== Personal life ==
In 1967 Johnston married Joan Graham Menzies, a bank clerk; they had three sons.

Lord Russell-Johnston collapsed and died in a Paris street on 27 July 2008, the day before his 76th birthday. He had been diagnosed with cancer, for which he was receiving chemotherapy. While undergoing treatment he continued to work on human rights issues for the Council of Europe. At the time of his death he and his wife had been estranged for over ten years, although they remained close friends.

Parliament of the United Kingdom
Preceded by Neil McLean	Member of Parliament for Inverness; 1964–1983	Constituency abolished
New constituency	Member of Parliament for Inverness, Nairn and Lochaber; 1983–1997	Constituency abolished
Party political offices
Preceded by George Mackie, Baron Mackie of Benshie	Chairman of the Scottish Liberal Party; 1970–1974	Succeeded by Menzies Campbell
Preceded by Office established	Leader of the Scottish Liberal Party; 1974–1988	Succeeded by Malcolm Bruce; Leader of the Scottish Liberal Democrats
Preceded by Alan Beith; Deputy Leader of the Liberal Party ? Deputy Leader of the Social Democratic Party	Deputy Leader of the Liberal Democrats; 1988–1992	Succeeded by Alan Beith
Preceded by George Mackie, Baron Mackie of Benshie as President of the Scottish Liberal Party	President of the Scottish Liberal Democrats; 1988–1994	Succeeded by ?
Political offices
Preceded by Leni Fischer	President of the Parliamentary Assembly of the Council of Europe; 1999–2002	Succeeded by Peter Schieder
