= 1911 Ross and Cromarty by-election =

UK parliamentary by-election

The 1911 Ross and Cromarty by-election was a Parliamentary by-election held on 14 June 1911. It returned one Member of Parliament (MP) to the House of Commons of the Parliament of the United Kingdom, elected by the first past the post voting system.

== Vacancy ==
James Galloway Weir died. He had been the sitting Liberal MP since 1892.

== Electoral history ==
This was a safe Liberal seat that the party had won at every election since 1847. Weir was returned at the last General election in December 1910. The previous contested election before that was the General election in January 1910;

General election January 1910: Ross and Cromarty Electorate 8,211
| Party | Candidate | Votes | % | ±% |
|---|---|---|---|---|
| Liberal | James Galloway Weir | 4,430 | 75.8 | +7.1 |
| Liberal Unionist | Neil Maclean | 1,418 | 24.2 | −7.1 |
| Majority | | 3,012 | 51.6 | +14.2 |
| Turnout | | 5,848 | 71.2 | +1.4 |
| Liberal hold | | Swing | +7.1 | |

== Candidates ==
- The Liberal candidate selected to defend the seat was 31-year-old Ian Macpherson. He was educated at the University of Edinburgh and was called to the Bar, by the Middle Temple in 1906. He had contested Wigtownshire in January 1910 and East Renfrewshire in December 1910.
- The Liberal Unionist candidate was the 35-year-old William Paterson Templeton. He was the Organising Secretary of Unionist Workers' League. He was standing for Parliament for the first time.

== Result ==
Polling took place on 14 June. Macpherson easily held the seat for the Liberals. Compared with the last contested election, his share of the vote only dropped by 1%;

Ian MacPherson

1911 Ross and Cromarty by-election Electorate
| Party | Candidate | Votes | % | ±% |
|---|---|---|---|---|
| Liberal | Ian Macpherson | 3,717 | 74.8 | −1.0 |
| Liberal Unionist | William Templeton | 1,253 | 25.2 | +1.0 |
| Majority | | 2,464 | 49.6 | −2.0 |
| Turnout | | 4,970 | 60.2 | −11.0 |
| Liberal hold | | Swing | -1.0 | |

== Aftermath ==
A General Election was due to take place by the end of 1915. By the autumn of 1914, the following candidates had been adopted to contest that election.

- Liberal:Ian Macpherson

Due to the outbreak of war, the election was postponed. Macpherson supported the Lloyd George Coalition Government and received their endorsement at the 1918 election.

General election 14 December 1918: Ross and Cromarty Electorate 20,685
| Party | Candidate | Votes | % | ±% |
|---|---|---|---|---|
| Liberal | Ian Macpherson | 8,358 | 78.9 | +4.1 |
| Highland Land League | Hector Munro | 2,238 | 21.1 | New |
| Majority | | 6,120 | 57.8 | +8.2 |
| Turnout | | 10,596 | 51.2 | −9.0 |
| Liberal hold | | Swing | | |

Templeton did not contest the 1918 General election but was later elected as MP for Banffshire.
