= Ross and Cromarty (UK Parliament constituency) =

Parliamentary constituency in the United Kingdom, 1832–1983

- Former county constituency for the House of Commons
- Subdivision: 1890–1975: Ross and Cromarty; 1975–1983: Highland

1832–1983
- Seats: One
- Created from: Inverness Burghs, Ross-shire and Cromartyshire
- Replaced by: Ross, Cromarty and Skye
- During its existence contributed to new seat(s) of: Na h-Eileanan an Iar or the Western Isles

Ross and Cromarty was a county constituency of the House of Commons of the UK Parliament from 1832 to 1983. It elected one Member of Parliament (MP) using the first-past-the-post voting system.

When created in 1832 by the Scottish Reform Act 1832 it combined in one seat the former seats Ross-shire and Cromartyshire.

In 1918 Lewis (a large island several miles offshore) was taken from the seat and merged into the then new Western Isles constituency, and the Fortrose component of the former Inverness Burghs constituency and the Dingwall and Cromarty Parliamentary burghs which formed part of the Wick Burghs constituency were merged into the Ross and Cromarty constituency.

In 1983 the remaining area of the seat was merged with the Isle of Skye and Isle of Raasay areas of the then-Inverness seat to form Ross, Cromarty and Skye.

== Local government areas ==
1890 to 1918

County councils were created in Scotland in 1890, and so the constituency area became also the county council area of Ross and Cromarty, minus the Fortrose, Dingwall and Cromarty parliamentary burghs.

1918 to 1975

When reformed in 1918 the constituency covered the county of Ross and Cromarty (including the former parliamentary burghs) minus Lewis.

1975 to 1983

County councils were abolished in 1975 and replaced with regions and districts and island council areas. The constituency area was then that of the district of Ross and Cromarty plus the Lochalsh area of Skye and Lochalsh. Both districts were within the Highland region.

See also

- Counties of Scotland
- Regions and districts of Scotland

== Members of Parliament ==
Election	Member	Party	Notes
1832	James Alexander Stewart-Mackenzie	Whig	
1837	Thomas Mackenzie	Conservative	
1847	Sir James Matheson	Whig	
1859	Sir James Matheson	Liberal	
1868	Alexander Matheson	Liberal	
1884 by-election	Ronald Munro-Ferguson; Later Viscount Novar	Liberal	
1885	Roderick Macdonald	Crofters	
1892	James Galloway Weir	Liberal	
1911 by-election	Ian Macpherson	Liberal	
1916	Ian Macpherson	Coalition Liberal	
1922	Ian Macpherson	National Liberal	
1923	Ian Macpherson	Liberal	
1931	Ian Macpherson	Liberal National	Later made Baron Strathcarron
1936 by-election	Malcolm MacDonald	National Labour	
1945	John MacLeod	Independent Liberal	
1947	John MacLeod	National Liberal	
1964	Alasdair Mackenzie	Liberal	
1970	Hamish Gray	Conservative	
1983	constituency abolished		

== Election results ==
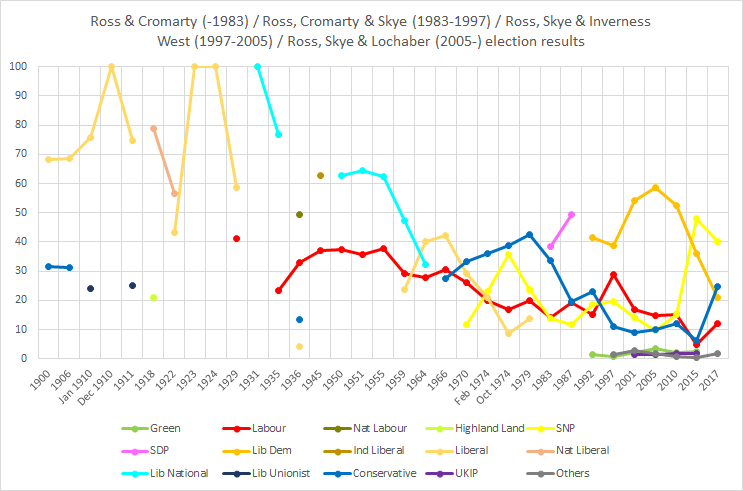
Ross and successor constituencies election results

=== Elections in the 1830s ===
General election 1832: Ross and Cromarty Shire
Party	Candidate	Votes	%
Whig	James Alexander Stewart-Mackenzie	272	64.8
Tory	Hugh Alexander Johnstone Munro	148	35.2
Majority		124	29.6
Turnout		420	81.4
Registered electors		516	
Whig win (new seat)			

General election 1835: Ross and Cromarty Shire
Party	Candidate	Votes	%	±%
Whig	James Alexander Stewart-Mackenzie	241	54.6	−10.2
Conservative	Thomas Mackenzie	200	45.4	+10.2
Majority		41	9.2	−20.4
Turnout		441	74.2	−7.2
Registered electors		594		
Whig hold		Swing	−10.2	

Stewart-Mackenzie resigned after being appointed as Governor of Ceylon, causing a by-election.

By-election, 18 April 1837: Ross and Cromarty Shire
Party	Candidate	Votes	%	±%
Conservative	Thomas Mackenzie	307	61.0	+15.6
Whig	William Mackenzie	196	39.0	−15.6
Majority		111	22.0	N/A
Turnout		503	66.7	−7.5
Registered electors		754		
Conservative gain from Whig		Swing	+15.6	

General election 1837: Ross and Cromarty Shire
Party	Candidate	Votes	%
Conservative	Thomas Mackenzie	Unopposed	
Registered electors		754	
Conservative gain from Whig			

=== Elections in the 1840s ===
General election 1841: Ross and Cromarty Shire
Party	Candidate	Votes	%	±%
Conservative	Thomas Mackenzie	Unopposed		
Registered electors		713		
Conservative hold				

General election 1847: Ross and Cromarty Shire
Party	Candidate	Votes	%	±%
Whig	James Matheson	Unopposed		
Registered electors		827		
Whig gain from Conservative				

=== Elections in the 1850s ===
General election 1852: Ross and Cromarty Shire
Party	Candidate	Votes	%	±%
Whig	James Matheson	288	56.9	N/A
Conservative	George William Holmes Ross	218	43.1	New
Majority		70	13.8	N/A
Turnout		506	60.8	N/A
Registered electors		832		
Whig hold		Swing	N/A	

General election 1857: Ross and Cromarty Shire
Party	Candidate	Votes	%	±%
Whig	James Matheson	Unopposed		
Registered electors		825		
Whig hold				

General election 1859: Ross and Cromarty Shire
Party	Candidate	Votes	%	±%
Liberal	James Matheson	Unopposed		
Registered electors		851		
Liberal hold				

=== Elections in the 1860s ===
General election 1865: Ross and Cromarty Shire
Party	Candidate	Votes	%	±%
Liberal	James Matheson	Unopposed		
Registered electors		933		
Liberal hold				

General election 1868: Ross and Cromarty Shire
Party	Candidate	Votes	%	±%
Liberal	Alexander Matheson	Unopposed		
Registered electors		1,564		
Liberal hold				

=== Elections in the 1870s ===
General election 1874: Ross and Cromarty Shire
Party	Candidate	Votes	%	±%
Liberal	Alexander Matheson	Unopposed		
Registered electors		1,559		
Liberal hold				

=== Elections in the 1880s ===
General election 1880: Ross and Cromarty Shire
Party	Candidate	Votes	%	±%
Liberal	Alexander Matheson	Unopposed		
Registered electors		1,664		
Liberal hold				

Matheson's resignation caused a by-election.

By-election, 22 August 1884: Ross and Cromarty Shire
Party	Candidate	Votes	%	±%
Liberal	Ronald Munro-Ferguson	717	55.2	N/A
Conservative	Alasdair Mackenzie	334	25.7	New
Crofters	Roderick Macdonald	248	19.1	New
Majority		383	29.5	N/A
Turnout		1,299	75.5	N/A
Registered electors		1,721		
Liberal hold		Swing	N/A	

General election 1885: Ross and Cromarty Shire
Party	Candidate	Votes	%	±%
Independent Liberal (Crofters)	Roderick Macdonald	4,942	62.8	N/A
Liberal	Ronald Munro-Ferguson	2,925	37.2	N/A
Majority		2,017	25.6	N/A
Turnout		7,867	76.6	N/A
Registered electors		10,265		
Independent Liberal gain from Liberal		Swing	N/A	

General election 1886: Ross and Cromarty Shire
Party	Candidate	Votes	%	±%
Liberal (Crofters)	Roderick Macdonald	4,263	78.1	+40.9
Liberal Unionist	John Peter Grant	1,197	21.9	New
Majority		3,066	56.2	+30.6
Turnout		5,460	53.2	−23.4
Registered electors		10,265		
Liberal gain from Independent Liberal		Swing		

=== Elections in the 1890s ===
Weir

General election 1892: Ross and Cromarty Shire
Party	Candidate	Votes	%	±%
Liberal (Crofters)	Galloway Weir	3,171	56.8	−21.3
Liberal Unionist	Neil Maclean	2,413	43.2	+21.3
Majority		758	13.6	−42.6
Turnout		5,584	62.3	+9.1
Registered electors		8,966		
Liberal hold		Swing	−21.3	

General election 1895: Ross and Cromarty Shire
Party	Candidate	Votes	%	±%
Liberal	Galloway Weir	3,272	57.6	+0.8
Liberal Unionist	Randle Jackson	2,409	42.4	−0.8
Majority		863	15.2	+1.6
Turnout		5,681	68.8	+6.5
Registered electors		8,256		
Liberal hold		Swing	+0.8	

=== Elections in the 1900s ===
General election 1900: Ross and Cromarty Shire
Party	Candidate	Votes	%	±%
Liberal	Galloway Weir	3,554	68.3	+10.7
Conservative	J.D. Fletcher	1,651	31.7	−10.7
Majority		1,903	36.6	+21.4
Turnout		5,205	65.8	−3.0
Registered electors		7,909		
Liberal hold		Swing	+10.7	

General election 1906: Ross and Cromarty Shire
Party	Candidate	Votes	%	±%
Liberal	Galloway Weir	3,883	68.7	+0.4
Conservative	James Crabb Watt	1,771	31.3	−0.4
Majority		2,112	37.4	+0.8
Turnout		5,654	69.8	+4.0
Registered electors		8,101		
Liberal hold		Swing	+0.4	

=== Elections in the 1910s ===
General election January 1910: Ross and Cromarty Shire
Party	Candidate	Votes	%	±%
Liberal	Galloway Weir	4,430	75.8	+7.1
Liberal Unionist	Neil Maclean	1,418	24.2	−7.1
Majority		3,012	51.6	+14.2
Turnout		5,848	71.2	+1.4
Registered electors		8,211		
Liberal hold		Swing	+7.1	

General election December 1910: Ross and Cromarty Shire
Party	Candidate	Votes	%	±%
Liberal	Galloway Weir	Unopposed		
Liberal hold				

1911 Ross and Cromarty by-election
Party	Candidate	Votes	%	±%
Liberal	Ian Macpherson	3,717	74.8	N/A
Liberal Unionist	William Templeton	1,253	25.2	N/A
Majority		2,464	49.6	N/A
Turnout		4,970	60.2	N/A
Registered electors		8,259		
Liberal hold		Swing	N/A	

General Election 1914–15:

Another General Election was required to take place before the end of 1915. The political parties had been making preparations for an election to take place and by July 1914, the following candidates had been selected;

- Liberal: Ian Macpherson
- Unionist: MacLeod

General election 1918: Ross and Cromarty Shire
Party		Candidate	Votes	%	±%
C	National Liberal	Ian Macpherson	8,358	78.9	N/A
	Highland Land League	Hector Munro	2,238	21.1	New
Majority			6,120	57.8	N/A
Turnout			10,636	51.2	N/A
	National Liberal hold		Swing		
C indicates candidate endorsed by the coalition government.

=== Elections in the 1920s ===
Ian MacPherson

General election 1922: Ross and Cromarty
Party	Candidate	Votes	%	±%
National Liberal	Ian Macpherson	5,923	56.7	−22.2
Liberal	John Macdonald	4,521	43.3	−35.6
Majority		1,402	13.4	−44.4
Turnout		10,444	42.4	−8.8
National Liberal hold		Swing		

General election 1923: Ross and Cromarty
Party	Candidate	Votes	%	±%
Liberal	Ian Macpherson	Unopposed		
Liberal hold				

General election 1924: Ross and Cromarty
Party	Candidate	Votes	%	±%
Liberal	Ian Macpherson	Unopposed		
Liberal hold				

General election 1929: Ross and Cromarty
Party	Candidate	Votes	%	±%
Liberal	Ian Macpherson	9,564	58.8	N/A
Labour	Hugh Donald MacIntosh	6,710	41.2	New
Majority		2,854	17.6	N/A
Turnout		16,274	55.6	N/A
Liberal hold		Swing	N/A	

=== Elections in the 1930s ===
General election 1931: Ross and Cromarty
Party	Candidate	Votes	%	±%
National Liberal	Ian Macpherson	Unopposed		
National Liberal hold				

General election 1935: Ross and Cromarty
Party	Candidate	Votes	%	±%
National Liberal	Ian Macpherson	10,810	76.7	N/A
Labour	John MacKinnon MacDiarmid	3,284	23.3	New
Majority		7,526	53.4	N/A
Turnout		14,094	50.8	N/A
National Liberal hold		Swing	N/A	

1936 Ross and Cromarty by-election
Party	Candidate	Votes	%	±%
National Labour	Malcolm MacDonald	8,949	49.5	N/A
Labour	Hector McNeil	5,967	33.0	+9.7
Unionist	Randolph Churchill	2,427	13.4	N/A
Liberal	Russell Thomas	738	4.1	N/A
Majority		2,982	16.5	N/A
Turnout		18,081	62.4	+11.6
National Labour gain from National Liberal		Swing		

=== Elections in the 1940s ===
General Election 1939–40

Another General Election was required to take place before the end of 1940. The political parties had been making preparations for an election to take place and by the Autumn of 1939, the following candidates had been selected;

- National Labour: Malcolm MacDonald
- Labour: Malcolm MacEwen

General election 1945: Ross and Cromarty
Party	Candidate	Votes	%	±%
Independent Liberal	John MacLeod	10,061	62.8	New
Labour	Angus Mackay Mackintosh	5,959	37.2	+13.9
Majority		4,102	25.6	N/A
Turnout		16,020	62.4	+11.6
Independent Liberal gain from National Labour		Swing		

=== Elections in the 1950s ===
General election 1950: Ross and Cromarty
Party	Candidate	Votes	%	±%
National Liberal (Conservative)	John MacLeod	10,912	62.6	–0.2
Labour	Alastair C Reid	6,521	37.4	+0.2
Majority		4,391	25.2	N/A
Turnout		17,433	63.1	+0.7
National Liberal hold		Swing	–0.2	

General election 1951: Ross and Cromarty
Party	Candidate	Votes	%	±%
National Liberal (Conservative)	John MacLeod	10,969	64.25	+1.6
Labour	Alastair C Reid	6,104	35.75	−1.7
Majority		4,865	28.5	+3.3
Turnout		17,073	57.5	−5.6
National Liberal hold		Swing		

General election 1955: Ross and Cromarty
Party	Candidate	Votes	%	±%
National Liberal (Conservative)	John MacLeod	9,929	62.3	−1.9
Labour	Jane B Saggar	6,003	37.7	+2.0
Majority		3,926	24.6	−3.9
Turnout		15,932	61.9	+4.4
National Liberal hold		Swing		

General election 1959: Ross and Cromarty
Party	Candidate	Votes	%	±%
National Liberal (Conservative)	John MacLeod	7,813	47.2	−15.1
Labour	Jane B Saggar	4,815	29.1	−8.6
Liberal	Colin Murchison	3,918	23.7	New
Majority		2,998	18.1	−6.5
Turnout		21,902	75.2	+13.3
National Liberal hold		Swing		

=== Elections in the 1960s ===
General election 1964: Ross and Cromarty
Party	Candidate	Votes	%	±%
Liberal	Alasdair Mackenzie	6,923	40.2	+16.5
National Liberal (Conservative)	John MacLeod	5,516	32.1	−15.1
Labour	William Alexander Ross	4,767	27.7	−1.4
Majority		1,407	8.2	N/A
Turnout		17,306	69.4	−5.8
Liberal gain from National Liberal		Swing		

General election 1966: Ross and Cromarty
Party	Candidate	Votes	%	±%
Liberal	Alasdair Mackenzie	7,348	42.1	+1.9
Labour	William Alexander Ross	5,304	30.4	+2.7
Conservative	Allan John Cameron	4,820	27.6	−4.5
Majority		2,044	11.7	+3.5
Turnout		17,472	71.2	+1.8
Liberal hold		Swing		

=== Elections in the 1970s ===
General election 1970: Ross and Cromarty
Party	Candidate	Votes	%	±%
Conservative	Hamish Gray	6,418	33.2	+5.6
Liberal	Alasdair Mackenzie	5,617	29.1	−13.0
Labour	Ronald D. Maclean	5,023	26.0	−4.4
SNP	George Nicholson	2,268	11.7	New
Majority		801	4.1	N/A
Turnout		19,326	71.7	+0.5
Conservative gain from Liberal		Swing		

General election February 1974: Ross and Cromarty
Party	Candidate	Votes	%	±%
Conservative	Hamish Gray	7,908	36.1	+2.9
SNP	Willie McRae	5,037	23.0	+11.3
Liberal	John C. Robertson	4,621	21.1	−8.0
Labour	Ronald D. Maclean	4,336	19.8	−6.2
Majority		2,871	13.1	+9.0
Turnout		21,902	75.2	+3.5
Conservative hold		Swing		

General election October 1974: Ross and Cromarty
Party	Candidate	Votes	%	±%
Conservative	Hamish Gray	7,954	38.9	+2.8
SNP	Willie McRae	7,291	35.7	+12.7
Labour	Brian Wilson	3,440	16.8	−3.0
Liberal	Tam Glen	1,747	8.6	−12.5
Majority		663	3.2	−9.9
Turnout		20,432	69.5	−5.7
Conservative hold		Swing		

General election 1979: Ross and Cromarty
Party	Candidate	Votes	%	±%
Conservative	Hamish Gray	10,650	42.4	+3.5
SNP	Willie McRae	5,915	23.6	−12.1
Labour	Keir Bloomer	5,055	20.1	+3.3
Liberal	Hamish Morrison	3,496	13.9	+5.3
Majority		4,735	18.8	+15.6
Turnout		25,116	76.4	+6.9
Conservative hold		Swing		
