= Strathcarron =

Strathcarron may refer to:

- Baron Strathcarron
- Strathcarron railway station
- Strathcarron Sports Cars
- Strathcarron, Highland, a village in Scotland
- the strath of the River Carron, Wester Ross
- the strath of the River Carron (Forth)
- the strath of the River Carron, Sutherland
