= Crofters Party =

British political party

The results of the 1885 UK general election in Scotland, showing the western Highlands and Caithness having elected MPs from the Crofters Party

The Crofters' Party was the parliamentary arm of the Highland Land League. It gained five MPs in the 1885 general election and five in the election of the following year.

The Highland Land League had started on the Isle of Skye, and in 1884 protest action was much more widespread: many thousands of crofters became members of the Highland Land League. A number of candidates stood with the Highland Land League's backing in the 1885 general election and in subsequent elections in the rest of the 19th century.

== MPs ==
The MPs elected with the backing of the Highland Land League formed themselves into the Crofters' Party, although they were also known as Independent Liberals. The MPs were:

- Donald Horne Macfarlane, Argyllshire
- Gavin Brown Clark, Caithness
- Charles Fraser-Mackintosh, Inverness-shire, who joined the Liberal Unionist Party before the 1892 election, so Galloway Weir was endorsed the Land League in his stead.
- Roderick Macdonald, Ross and Cromarty
- Angus Sutherland was defeated in Sutherland, but won in 1886, when the incumbent Marquess of Sutherland did not stand. In 1894, Angus Sutherland was appointed Chairman of the Fishery Board for Scotland, causing a by-election in which John MacLeod was elected unopposed; MacLeod defeated the Liberal Unionist candidate the following year.
- John Macdonald Cameron, Wick Burghs (allied with the Crofters Party)

Also standing in 1885 was Walter McLaren, a Land League-endorsed Independent Liberal who was beaten by Liberal candidate Robert Finlay in the Inverness Burghs.

A year later Parliament passed the Crofters Act, formally the Crofters' Holdings (Scotland) Act 1886 (49 & 50 Vict. c. 29), which applied to croft tenure in an area which is now recognisable as a definition of the Highlands and Islands The Act granted real security of tenure of existing crofts and established the first Crofters Commission which had rent-fixing powers. Rents were generally reduced and 50% or more of outstanding arrears were cancelled. The Act failed however to address the issue of severely limited access to land, and crofters renewed their protest actions.

At the same time there was a shift in the political climate: William Gladstone's Liberal government fell from power; the new Conservative government was much less sympathetic to the plight of crofters and much more willing to use troops to quell protests. The Liberal Party appeared to adopt and champion Land League objectives and, as a distinct parliamentary force, the Land League fragmented during the 1890s.

== Electoral results ==
Constituency	1885	1886	1892	1894	1895	1895
Argyllshire	**Macfarlane*** (Ind. Lib.)	Malcolm† (U.)		**Macfarlane*** (Lib.)		Nicol† (U., to 1903)
Caithness	**Clark***‡ (Ind. Lib., then Lib.)					
Inverness-shire	**Fraser-Mackintosh*** (Ind. Lib., then Lib. U.)			**MacGregor*** (Lib.)		Baillie‡ (U.)
Inverness Burghs	Finlay (Lib.)	Finlay (now Lib. U.)		Beith (Lib.)		Finlay (Lib. U., to 1906)
Ross and Cromarty	**Macdonald*** (Ind. Lib., then Lib.)			**Weir*** (Lib., to 1911)		
Sutherland	Mqs of Stafford (Lib.)	**Sutherland*** (Ind. Lib., then Lib.)			**MacLeod***† (Lib.)	
Wick Burghs	**Cameron*** (WRWA, then Lib.)			Pender† (Lib. U., resigned 1896)		
References						

Candidates with asterisks (*) and names in bold were endorsed by the Land League as Crofters Party candidates. Candidates with a dagger (†) were elected ahead of candidates endorsed by the Land League. Candidates with a double dagger (‡) were unseated in the 1900 United Kingdom general election. John Macdonald Cameron, MP for Wick Burghs, ran under the banner of the Wick Radical Workingmen's Association in 1885, but was endorsed by the Land League; subsequently he ran as the official Liberal Party candidate. Liberal Unionist John Pender beat John Macdonald Cameron in 1892 but his 1896 opponent was not Land League endorsed.
