= John Macleod (Sutherland MP) =

John Macleod, sometimes John Macleod of Gartymore, (8 August 1862 – 1 April 1931) was MP for Sutherland, representing the Crofters Party (allied to the Liberal Party).

Macleod was born at Helmsdale in 1862 (though he often stated 1863 in later life), the son of John and Ann McLeod. His father was a fish-curer. He trained in Glasgow as an analytical chemist, then after further study in London worked for a Welsh gold-mining company at Gwynfynydd and Glasdir. They sent him to Sutherland in around 1882 to investigate the potential for gold mines at Kildonan, where there had been a minor gold rush in the late 1860s. While working there, he attended a public meeting of the Napier Commission and became active in the land reform movement.

Through the 1880s, he campaigned for the Highland Land League, and was one of the founders of the Sutherland county branch of the movement. He was the campaign agent for Angus Sutherland in the 1885 and 1886 general elections, when Sutherland was elected as the Crofters candidate for the county. In 1888 he moved to Inverness, where he became an editor of the Highland News. He was again active in the county Liberal association, and helped support the election of Donald MacGregor there in 1892. In 1893 he was elected as a representative for Lewis – where he had never visited – on the Ross-shire county council, and appointed Secretary of the Highland Land League.

When Angus Sutherland stood down as an MP in 1894, Macleod was well-placed to secure the Liberal nomination as his successor. He was challenged by Dr. Donald Murray of Brora (later to become MP for the Western Isles), who felt that the county should have consulted more widely before selecting a candidate. Murray stood down in the interests of party unity, though not without a public rebuke to Macleod and his use of the Highland News.

Following this, Macleod was returned unopposed as the Crofters/Liberal candidate. At the 1895 general election he was returned with 65% of the vote, a comfortable majority over the Liberal Unionist candidate, though slightly reduced from Sutherland's 72% in 1886 and 17% in 1892. In the 1900 general election, however, he was defeated by the Liberal Unionist Frederick Leveson-Gower, a relative of the Duke of Sutherland, taking only 38% of the vote.

After leaving Parliament, he appears to have remained in London, where he is found working as a journalist in the 1901 and 1911 censuses. He died at Claybury Hospital, a psychiatric institution in London, on 1 April 1931; he had been a patient there since at least 1929.

Parliament of the United Kingdom
| Preceded by Angus Sutherland | Member of Parliament for Sutherland; 1894 – 1900 | Succeeded by Frederick Leveson-Gower |
