= Angus Sutherland =

Angus Sutherland may refer to:

- Angus Sutherland (actor) (born 1982), Canadian-American actor
- Angus Sutherland (politician) (1848–1922), Scottish Liberal politician
