= Ian Macpherson, 3rd Baron Strathcarron =

British peer

The Right Honourable: The Lord Strathcarron
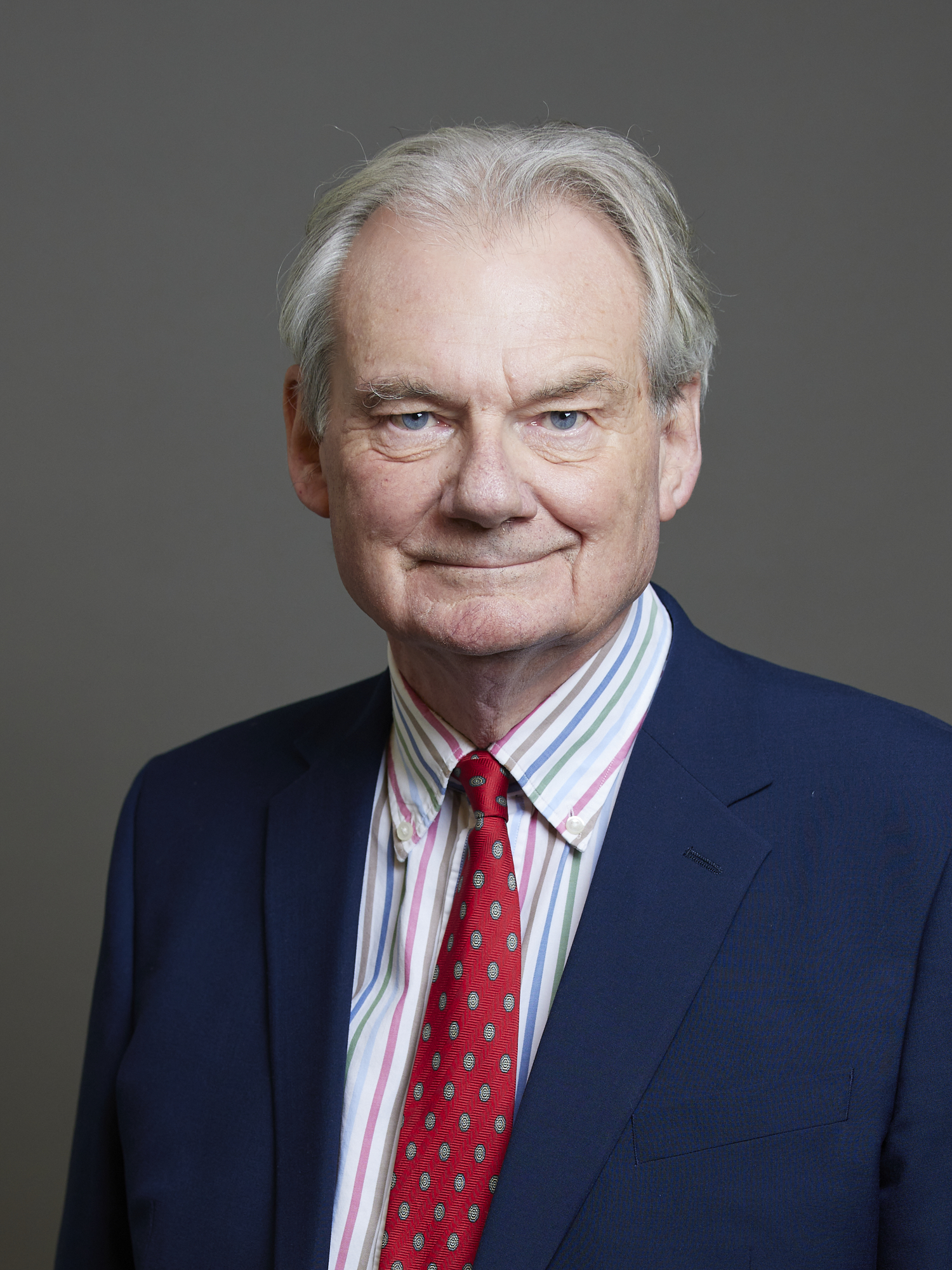
- Official portrait, 2022

Member of the House of Lords
- Lord Temporal
- Elected Hereditary Peer; 18 February 2022 – 29 April 2026
- By-election: 2022
- Preceded by: The 5th Viscount Ridley
- Succeeded by: position abolished

Personal details
- Born: Ian David Patrick Macpherson; 31 March 1949 (age 77) London, England
- Party: Non-affiliated
- Spouse: Gillian Rosamund Allison
- Children: 2
- Parent: David Macpherson, 2nd Baron Strathcarron

Ian David Patrick Macpherson, 3rd Baron Strathcarron (born 31 March 1949), is a British hereditary peer and former member of House of Lords. He is also the baronet Sir Ian David Patrick Macpherson of Drumalban. He inherited the titles on the death of his father David Macpherson, 2nd Baron Strathcarron, on 31 August 2006.

== Education ==
Strathcarron's early education was at Hill House School, before attending Horris Hill and then Eton College; after Eton, he went to Grenoble University.

== Personal life ==
Strathcarron married the former Gillian Rosamund Allison (born 15 September 1946) in 1974 and they have two children.

== Career ==
Strathcarron spent ten years in East Asia working for Time Life as a freelance journalist and copywriter. In 1970, he founded the Japan Europa Press Agency in Tokyo and sold it in 1995.

He became a partner in Strathcarron & Company in 1974, and a founder and Director of Global Alliance Automotive Ltd, a transnational version of Strathcarron & Company in 1993. In 1995, he founded Strathcarron Sports Cars plc, manufacturers of sports/racing cars and since 2006 he has been a trustee and director of the National Motor Museum in Beaulieu, Hampshire.

He is chairman and commissioning editor of Unicorn Publishing House Ltd, a visual arts, cultural history and digital publishing and media distribution company. In 2018, he founded the transmedia production company Affable Media Ltd.

In February 2022, he was elected to replace Viscount Ridley in the House of Lords following Ridley's retirement in December 2021. He took the oath on 21 February 2022.

== Media works ==
Strathcarron is a student of Advaita Vedanta and has written of his experiences in non-duality in the books Living with Life and Mysticism and Bliss. He is also the author of two spy thriller novels for Troubador: Invisibility, and Black Beach.

In 2009, he recreated Lord Byron's 1809–1811 Grand Tour of the Mediterranean for the book Joy Unconfined! Lord Byron's Grand Tour Re-Toured published by Signal Books, an imprint of Christopher Hurst.

In 2010, he completed the first part of a Mark Twain travel trilogy based on Twain's 1867 tour of the Holy Land, resulting in the book Innocence & War: Mark Twain's Holy Land Revisited published in 2012 in the US by Dover Publications and in the UK by Signal Books. The second part of the trilogy, recreating Mark Twain's 1896 lecture tour of India for the book The Indian Equator; Mark Twain's India Revisited published in 2014 in the US by Dover Publications and in the UK by Signal Books.

In 2016, Unicorn Press published his biography of Sir Francis Chichester, Never Fear: Reliving the Life of Sir Francis Chichester.

In 2017, Unicorn Press published his art book about the painter Sophie Walbeoffe, Painting with Both Hands.

In 2020, Unicorn published his spiritual abstract art book Truth and Beauty: The Art of Sophie Chang.

In 2022, he wrote and produced the short film Undead and Alive, a zombie/witch romcom.

In 2025, Unicorn published his art book 'Delightful, Enchanting.': The Art of Annabel Fairfax.

In 2026, Histria Books US published his sports history book Andrea Moda Formula: The Legend of the Formula One Team Too Bad To Be True.

== Interests and hobbies ==
An ex-Yachtmaster Instructor, Strathcarron is an Honorary Life Member of the Royal Bombay Yacht Club, a member of the Royal Cruising Club and the Royal Yacht Squadron (see List of Royal Yacht Squadron members), and Commodore of the House of Lords Yacht Club.

In 2012, he qualified as a civil and commercial mediator with the Civil Mediation Council. In 2013, he qualified as a Restorative Justice practitioner, registered with the Restorative Justice Council. He is also the vice-chair and a trustee of The Society of Mediators.

== Arms ==
Coat of arms of Ian Macpherson, 3rd Baron Strathcarron
Crest A cat-a-mountain sejant guardant having its dexter paw raised Proper. Escutcheon Per fess Or and Azure a galley of the first masts oars and tacking Proper flagged Gules in the dexter chief point a hand couped fesswise holding a dagger palewise and in the sinister a cross crosslet fitchee of the last over all a fess chequy of the second and Argent. Supporters Dexter a private soldier of the Cameron Highlanders in full service dress of the period 1916-18 sinister a Macpherson clansman of the period of 1745. Motto Le Cridhe's Le Cliu

Peerage of the United Kingdom
Preceded by David Macpherson	Baron Strathcarron; 2006–present	Incumbent; Heir apparent: Hon. Rory Macpherson
Baronetage of the United Kingdom
Preceded by David Macpherson	Baronet of Drumalban; 2006–present	Incumbent; Heir apparent: Hon. Rory Macpherson
Parliament of the United Kingdom
Preceded by The Viscount Ridley	Elected hereditary peer to the House of Lords under the House of Lords Act 1999; 2022–2026	Position abolished under the House of Lords (Hereditary Peers) Act 2026
