= SC-5 =

SC-5, SC5, SC 5 or variants, may refer to:

- SC05, an FIPS 10-4 region code
- SC-05, a subdivision code for Anse Royale, Seychelles, see ISO 3166-2:SC
- South Carolina's 5th congressional district
- South Carolina Highway 5
- USS Cuttlefish (SC-5)
- SpaceX Crew-5

== Video games ==
- Soulcalibur V
- Space Channel 5

== See also ==
- Strathcarron SC-5A
