= Robert Purvis (politician) =

British politician

- Purvis in 1895

Member of Parliament for Peterborough
- In office 1895–1906
- Preceded by: Alpheus Morton
- Succeeded by: Granville Greenwood

Personal details
- Born: 5 July 1844 Roxburghshire, Scotland
- Died: 23 June 1920 (aged 75)
- Party: Liberal Unionist
- Other political affiliations: Liberal (1885-1886)
- Occupation: Barrister

Sir Robert Purvis (5 July 1844 – 23 June 1920) was a British barrister and Liberal Unionist politician. He sat in the House of Commons from 1895 to 1906 as the member of parliament (MP) for Peterborough.

== Early life ==
Robert Purvis was born on 5 July 1844 in Roxburghshire, the third son of Joseph Purvis. The family moved to Hexham when Purvis was small. He was educated at Marlborough and at Downing College, Cambridge, where he graduated with a BA in 1880, an MA and LL.M in 1875, and as a Doctor of law (LL.D) in 1881.

== Career ==
He was called to the bar in 1873 at the Inner Temple, and practised on the North Eastern Circuit.

At the 1885 general election he unsuccessfully contested the Abingdon division of Berkshire as a Liberal Party candidate. When the Liberals split over Home Rule for Ireland, they took the Unionist side, and at the 1886 election he stood as a Liberal Unionist in Edinburgh South, but lost to William Ewart Gladstone's ally and former minister, Hugh Childers, who had been defeated in his previous district the previous December.

General election 1886: Edinburgh South
Party	Candidate	Votes	%	±%
Liberal	Hugh Childers	3,778		
Liberal Unionist	Robert Purvis	2,191		
Majority		1,587		

Purvis then contested the Peterborough by-election in October 1889, but lost to the Liberal candidate Alpheus Morton. The election was fought largely on the issue of Home Rule, which Purvis asserted was opposed to the true principles of democracy, because if Ireland got Home Rule because its people wanted it, then they would also have to get separation if they demanded it. (The report in The Times did not explain why Purvis considered separation to be opposed to democracy).

He contested the seat again in 1892, cutting Morton's majority to 158 votes (4% of the total), down from 251 votes (7%)in 1889. Purvis won Peterborough on his third attempt, when he defeated Morton at the 1895 general election. Morton had hoped to contest the seat again in 1900, but the local Liberals declined to nominate him again, and Purvis was re-elected with a reduced majority over the Liberal candidate Halley Stewart.

In 1903 he supported Joseph Chamberlain's policy of Imperial Preference, a proposed system of reciprocally-levelled tariffs or free trade agreements between different Dominions and Colonies within the British Empire which had caused a division in Unionist ranks.

He was knighted in 1905, in the King's Birthday Honours, but lost his seat at the 1906 general election to the Liberal Granville Greenwood, who won by a large majority of 1,159 votes (21% of the total).

Purvis continued as an active Liberal Unionist, and in December 1908 he was one of several speaker at a mass meeting on tariff reform held in Stamford. He contested Peterborough again at the January 1910 general election, but even before Parliament was dissolved on 10 January, The Times was pessimistic about his chances. The Liberal majority in 1906 was "decisive", and Greenwood had the support of most of Peterborough's railway and engineering workers made up a large proportion of the electorate. When the votes were counted, Greenwood had held the seat, although with a more modest majority of 43 votes (7%).

In 1914, he supported calls by Unionist MP Jesse Collings for tenant farmers to become owner-occupiers of their lands. He saw it as an alternative to encouraging he emigration of young men to take up land grants in the colonies, and as a bulwark against radical Liberal proposals to nationalise the land.

== Family and death ==
In 1874 Purvis married Elizabeth Marion Peat, eldest daughter of William Henry Peat, a merchant from London.

He died on 23 June 1920.

Parliament of the United Kingdom
Preceded by Alpheus Morton	Member of Parliament for Peterborough; 1895 – 1906	Succeeded by Granville Greenwood
