= Sutherland (UK Parliament constituency) =

Parliamentary constituency in the United Kingdom, 1801–1918

- Former county constituency for the House of Commons
- Subdivisions of Scotland: Sutherland

1708–1918
- Seats: One
- Created from: Sutherland
- Replaced by: Caithness & Sutherland

Sutherland was a Scottish constituency of the House of Commons of the Parliament of Great Britain from 1708 to 1801 and of the Parliament of the United Kingdom from 1801 to 1918.

== Creation ==
The British parliamentary constituency was created in 1708 following the Acts of Union, 1707 and replaced the former Parliament of Scotland shire constituency of Sutherlandshire.

== Boundaries ==
The constituency represented essentially the traditional county of Sutherland. The county town of Dornoch, however, was represented as a component of the Tain Burghs constituency, from 1708 to 1832, and of the Wick Burghs constituency, from 1832 to 1918.

== History ==
The constituency elected one Member of Parliament (MP) by the first past the post system until the seat was abolished in 1918. In 1918 the Sutherland constituency and Dornoch were merged into the then new constituency of Caithness and Sutherland. In 1997 Caithness and Sutherland was merged into Caithness, Sutherland and Easter Ross.

== Members of Parliament ==
Election	Member	Party
1708	Sir William Gordon	
1713	William Morison	
1714	Sir William Gordon	
1727	Lord Strathnaver	
1734	Sir James Fergusson	
1736	Hon. James St Clair	
1747	Hon. George Mackay	
1761	Hon. Alexander Mackay	
1768	James Wemyss	
1784	William Wemyss	Pittite
1787	James Grant	
1802	William Dundas	Tory
1808	John Randoll Mackenzie	
1809	George Macpherson-Grant	
1812	James Macdonald	Whig
1816	George Macpherson-Grant	
1826	Lord Francis Leveson-Gower	Tory
1831	Sir Hugh Innes	Whig
1831 by-election	Roderick Macleod	Whig
1837	Hon. William Howard	Conservative
1840 by-election	Sir David Dundas	Whig
1852	Marquess of Stafford	Whig
1859	Marquess of Stafford	Liberal
1861 by-election	Sir David Dundas	Liberal
1867 by-election	Lord Ronald Gower	Liberal
1874	Marquess of Stafford	Liberal
1886	Angus Sutherland	Liberal/Crofter
1894 by-election	John MacLeod	Liberal/Crofter
1900	Frederick Leveson-Gower	Liberal Unionist
1906	Alpheus Morton	Liberal
1918	constituency abolished	

== Elections ==
Decades:	1840s; 1850s; 1860s; 1870s; 1880s; 1890s; 1900s; 1910s

=== Elections in the 1830s ===
General election 1830: Sutherland
Party	Candidate	Votes	%
Tory	Francis Leveson-Gower	Unopposed	
Registered electors		20	
Tory hold			

General election 1831: Sutherland
Party	Candidate	Votes	%
Whig	Hugh Innes	Unopposed	
Registered electors		20	
Whig gain from Tory			

Innes' death caused a by-election.

By-election, 14 September 1831: Sutherland
Party	Candidate	Votes	%
Whig	Roderick Macleod	Unopposed	
Registered electors		20	
Whig hold			

General election 1832: Sutherland
Party	Candidate	Votes	%
Whig	Roderick Macleod	Unopposed	
Registered electors		84	
Whig hold			

General election 1835: Sutherland
Party	Candidate	Votes	%
Whig	Roderick Macleod	Unopposed	
Registered electors		108	
Whig hold			

General election 1837: Sutherland
Party	Candidate	Votes	%
Conservative	William Howard	Unopposed	
Registered electors		128	
Conservative gain from Whig			

=== Elections in the 1840s ===
Howard resigned by accepting the office of Steward of the Chiltern Hundreds, causing a by-election.

By-election, 8 April 1840: Sutherland
Party	Candidate	Votes	%	±%
Whig	David Dundas	Unopposed		
Whig gain from Conservative				

General election 1841: Sutherland
Party	Candidate	Votes	%	±%
Whig	David Dundas	Unopposed		
Registered electors		137		
Whig gain from Conservative				

Dundas was appointed Solicitor General for Scotland, requiring a by-election.

By-election, 28 July 1846: Sutherland
Party	Candidate	Votes	%	±%
Whig	David Dundas	Unopposed		
Whig hold				

General election 1847: Sutherland
Party	Candidate	Votes	%	±%
Whig	David Dundas	Unopposed		
Registered electors		184		
Whig hold				

Dundas was appointed Judge Advocate General of the Armed Forces, requiring a by-election.

By-election, 5 June 1849: Sutherland
Party	Candidate	Votes	%	±%
Whig	David Dundas	Unopposed		
Whig hold				

=== Elections in the 1850s ===
General election 1852: Sutherland
Party	Candidate	Votes	%	±%
Whig	George Sutherland-Leveson-Gower	Unopposed		
Registered electors		207		
Whig hold				

General election 1857: Sutherland
Party	Candidate	Votes	%	±%
Whig	George Sutherland-Leveson-Gower	Unopposed		
Registered electors		264		
Whig hold				

General election 1859: Sutherland
Party	Candidate	Votes	%	±%
Liberal	George Sutherland-Leveson-Gower	Unopposed		
Registered electors		298		
Liberal hold				

=== Elections in the 1860s ===
Sutherland-Leveson-Gower succeeded to the peerage, becoming 3rd Duke of Sutherland, and causing a by-election.

By-election, 27 March 1861: Sutherland
Party	Candidate	Votes	%	±%
Liberal	David Dundas	Unopposed		
Liberal hold				

General election 1865: Sutherland
Party	Candidate	Votes	%	±%
Liberal	David Dundas	Unopposed		
Registered electors		180		
Liberal hold				

Dundas resigned, causing a by-election.

By-election, 27 May 1867: Sutherland
Party	Candidate	Votes	%	±%
Liberal	Ronald Gower	Unopposed		
Liberal hold				

General election 1868: Sutherland
Party	Candidate	Votes	%	±%
Liberal	Ronald Gower	Unopposed		
Registered electors		358		
Liberal hold				

=== Elections in the 1870s ===
General election 1874: Sutherland
Party	Candidate	Votes	%	±%
Liberal	Marquess of Stafford	Unopposed		
Registered electors		324		
Liberal hold				

=== Elections in the 1880s ===
General election 1880: Sutherland
Party	Candidate	Votes	%	±%
Liberal	Marquess of Stafford	Unopposed		
Registered electors		326		
Liberal hold				

General election 1885: Sutherland
Party	Candidate	Votes	%	±%
Liberal	Marquess of Stafford	1,701	61.7	N/A
Independent Liberal (Crofters)	Angus Sutherland	1,058	38.3	New
Majority		643	23.4	N/A
Turnout		2,759	86.6	N/A
Registered electors		3,185		
Liberal hold		Swing	N/A	

General election 1886: Sutherland
Party	Candidate	Votes	%	±%
Liberal (Crofters)	Angus Sutherland	1,463	71.5	+9.8
Liberal Unionist	Ralph Wardlaw McLeod Fullarton	583	28.5	New
Majority		880	43.0	+19.6
Turnout		2,046	64.2	−22.4
Registered electors		3,185		
Liberal hold				

=== Elections in the 1890s ===
General election 1892: Sutherland
Party	Candidate	Votes	%	±%
Liberal (Crofters)	Angus Sutherland	1,453	70.5	-1.0
Liberal Unionist	John MacKay	607	29.5	+1.0
Majority		846	41.0	−2.0
Turnout		2,060	75.0	+10.8
Registered electors		2,745		
Liberal hold		Swing	-1.0	

Sutherland was appointed Chairman of the Fishery Board for Scotland, causing a by-election.

By-election, 26 Oct 1894: Sutherland
Party	Candidate	Votes	%	±%
Liberal (Crofters)	John MacLeod	Unopposed		
Liberal hold				

General election 1895: Sutherland
Party	Candidate	Votes	%	±%
Liberal	John MacLeod	1,085	64.8	−5.7
Liberal Unionist	John Alexander Swanston	590	35.2	+5.7
Majority		495	29.6	−11.4
Turnout		1,675	67.2	−7.8
Registered electors		2,493		
Liberal hold		Swing	−5.7	

=== Elections in the 1900s ===
General election 1900: Sutherland
Party	Candidate	Votes	%	±%
Liberal Unionist	Frederick Leveson-Gower	1,224	61.9	+26.7
Liberal	John MacLeod	752	38.1	−26.7
Majority		472	23.8	N/A
Turnout		1,977	76.3	+9.1
Registered electors		2,589		
Liberal Unionist gain from Liberal		Swing	+26.7	

General election 1906: Sutherland
Party	Candidate	Votes	%	±%
Liberal	Alpheus Morton	1,383	59.7	+21.6
Liberal Unionist	Frederick Leveson-Gower	933	40.3	−21.6
Majority		450	19.4	N/A
Turnout		2,316	82.3	+6.0
Registered electors		2,814		
Liberal gain from Liberal Unionist		Swing	+21.6	

=== Elections in the 1910s ===
Morton

General election January 1910: Sutherland
Party	Candidate	Votes	%	±%
Liberal	Alpheus Morton	1,607	62.8	+3.1
Conservative	Donald Cameron	951	37.2	−3.1
Majority		656	25.6	+6.2
Turnout		2,558	83.7	+1.4
Registered electors		3,055		
Liberal hold		Swing	+3.1	

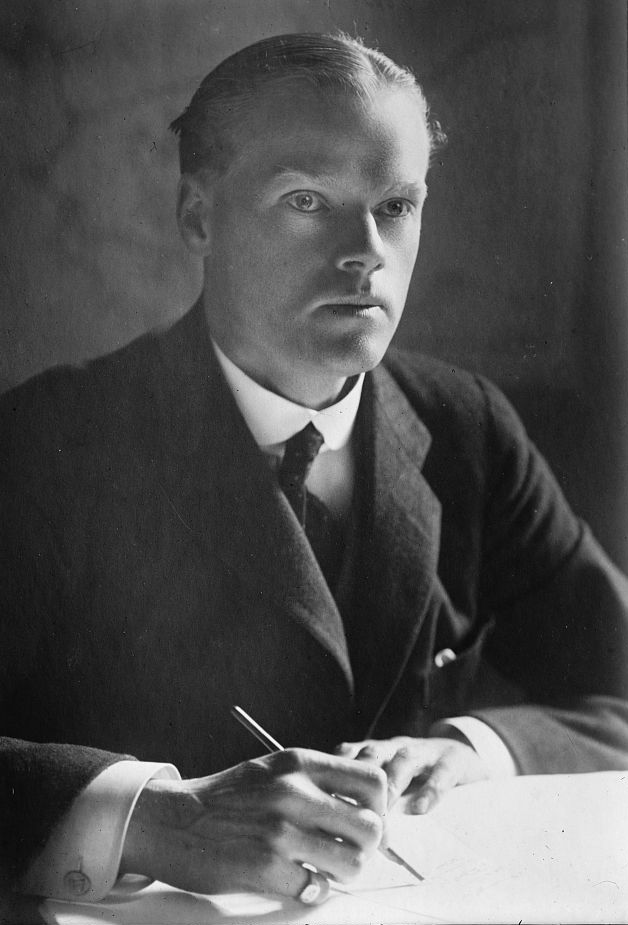
Stafford

General election December 1910: Sutherland
Party	Candidate	Votes	%	±%
Liberal	Alpheus Morton	1,464	53.4	−9.4
Liberal Unionist	Marquess of Stafford	1,277	46.6	+9.4
Majority		187	6.8	−18.8
Turnout		2,741		
Liberal hold		Swing	-9.4	

General Election 1914–15:

Another General Election was required to take place before the end of 1915. The political parties had been making preparations for an election to take place and by July 1914, the following candidates had been selected;

- Liberal: Alpheus Morton
- Unionist: Theodore Gervase Chambers
