= Alpheus Morton =

British politician

Sir Alpheus Morton

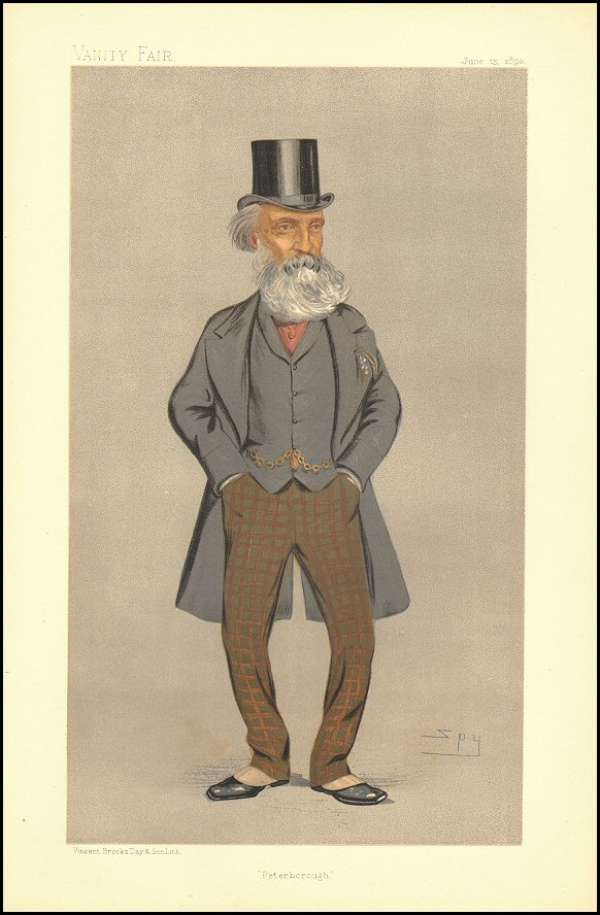
"Peterborough". Caricature by Spy published in Vanity Fair in 1893.

Sir Alpheus Cleophas Morton (12 March 1840 – 26 April 1923) was a British architect and surveyor, and a Liberal Party politician. He was active in local government in London from the 1880s until his death, and sat in the House of Commons in two periods between 1889 and 1918.

== Career ==
Morton was born in Cheltenham, Gloucestershire, the son of Francis and Ann Morton, and considered himself Scottish. He was educated privately in Canada. He became an architect and surveyor, based in Chancery Lane in London. By 1885 he was living in Clapham, and was a member of the Wandsworth District Board of Works and president of the Clapham, Stockwell, and South Lambeth Water Consumers' Defence Association.

He was a member of the City of London Corporation from 1882 until his death, for the ward of Farringdon Without. The park at Finsbury Circus was known as "Morton's Park" in Corporation circles, because it was mainly due to his work that the gardens had been opened to the public after being compulsorily purchased by the Corporation through powers in the City of London (Various Powers) Act 1900. Morton was one of those who gave evidence in support of the proposal to the House of Commons Select Committee which scrutinised the Bill in March 1900. The Act received Royal Assent in July 1900, and in August of each year Morton made an annual gift to the Lord Mayor of London of the first crop of mulberries from the park's gardens.

He was later a member of the City and Guilds of London Institute, a member of the Commission of Lieutenancy of the City of London, a governor of St Bartholomew's Hospital, and chairman of the Metropolitan Paving Committee. In January 1918 he was appointed as a trustee of the Crystal Palace, as a representative of the City of London Corporation.

=== Parliament ===
Morton first stood for Parliament at the 1885 general election, when he contested Hythe, and was unsuccessful again in Christchurch at the 1886 election. He won a seat three years later, when he was elected at a by-election in October 1889 as the member of parliament (MP) for Peterborough, after the death of the Liberal Unionist MP John Wentworth-FitzWilliam, becoming the 81st new MP since the general election in 1886. His victory was unexpected, and when the result was declared he said that he hoped his victory would be seen as a gesture of conciliation Ireland. He was re-elected in 1892, and raised in Parliament the issue of the appointment of Justices of the Peace (magistrates) in April 1893. In November that year, 280 Gladstonian MPs met the Lord Chancellor, Lord Herschell, in the House of Lords to discuss the system. Morton led the response to the Lord Chancellor's explanation and defence of the existing system of appointment, and denounced the reliance on advice from Lord Lieutenants who were entirely dependent on what Morton called "class cliques". He was also a member of a Select Committee set up to examine the accommodation provided for members and officials of the House of Commons. Great Western Railway

At the 1895 general election, Morton was defeated in Peterborough by the Liberal Unionist Robert Purvis. He continued to "nurse" the constituency in the hope of a return at the next election, but in May 1900 the Peterborough Liberal Association rejected a motion to adopt him as their candidate, choosing instead Halley Stewart, the former MP for Spalding.

He contested Bath at the general election in October 1900, supported by a campaigning visit from former Liberal leader Sir William Vernon Harcourt. However, the city's two seats were won by a Conservative Party and a Liberal Unionist, and Morton was the last-placed of the four candidates. After eleven years out of the Commons, he was returned at the 1906 general election as MP for the Scottish county of Sutherland, defeating the sitting Liberal Unionist MP Frederick Leveson-Gower. He was re-elected for Sutherland in both the January and December 1910 elections, and held the seat until the constituency was abolished at the 1918 general election.

In July 1910 he abstained on the Second Reading vote on the Parliamentary Franchise (Women) Bill, but voted in favour of Bill being referred to a Committee of the Whole House.

He was knighted on 6 February 1918, at a ceremony in Buckingham Palace where the new knights (who included the architect Edwin Lutyens) were introduced to King George V by the Home Secretary Sir George Cave.

Morton died on 26 April 1923, aged about 83. A memorial service for him was held on 2 May in the church of St Dunstan-in-the-West in Fleet Street, where he had been a churchwarden, and had led the opposition 1919 to a proposal by the Bishop of London's Commission on the City Churches to demolish St Dunstans and 18 other churches.

Parliament of the United Kingdom
Preceded by Hon. John Wentworth-FitzWilliam	Member of Parliament for Peterborough; 1889 – 1895	Succeeded by Robert Purvis
Preceded by Frederick Leveson-Gower	Member of Parliament for Sutherland; 1906 – 1918	Constituency abolished
