= Ian Macpherson, 1st Baron Strathcarron =

British politician (1880–1937)

The Right Honourable The Lord Strathcarron PC PC (Ire) KC JP
- Macpherson in 1920

Chief Secretary for Ireland
- In office 10 January 1919 – 2 April 1920
- Monarch: George V
- Prime Minister: David Lloyd George
- Preceded by: Edward Shortt
- Succeeded by: Sir Hamar Greenwood, Bt

Minister of Pensions
- In office 2 April 1920 – 19 October 1922
- Monarch: George V
- Prime Minister: David Lloyd George
- Preceded by: Sir Laming Worthington-Evans, Bt
- Succeeded by: George Tryon

Personal details
- Born: 14 May 1880 Scotland
- Died: 14 August 1937 (aged 57)
- Party: Liberal, Liberal National
- Spouse: Jill Rhodes (died 1956)
- Children: 3, including David
- Education: University of Edinburgh

James Ian Stewart Macpherson, 1st Baron Strathcarron, PC, PC (Ire), KC, JP (14 May 1880 – 14 August 1937), known as Sir Ian Macpherson, 1st Baronet, between 1933 and 1936, was a Scottish lawyer and Liberal politician. In 1931 he joined the breakway Liberal National Party.

== Background and education ==
Macpherson was the son of James Macpherson, JP, of Inverness, and Anne, daughter of James Stewart. Lord Drumalbyn, George Macpherson and Sir Tommy Macpherson were his nephews. He was educated at the University of Edinburgh and was called to the Bar, Middle Temple, in 1906.

== Political career ==
Macpherson sat as Member of Parliament for Ross and Cromarty from 1911 to 1935. In 1916 he was appointed Under-Secretary of State for War, a post he held until 1918, and then served as Deputy Secretary of State for War and Vice-President of the Army Council between 1918 and 1919, as Chief Secretary for Ireland between 1919 and 1920 and as Minister of Pensions between 1920 and 1922.

He was admitted to the British Privy Council in 1918 and to the Irish Privy Council in 1919 and made a King's Counsel in 1919.

He was created a Baronet, of Banchor in the County of Inverness, in 1933 and raised to the peerage as Baron Strathcarron, of Banchor in the County of Inverness, in 1936.

== Family ==
Lord Strathcarron married Jill, daughter of Sir George Rhodes, 1st Baronet, in 1915. They had one son and two daughters. He died in London in August 1937, aged 57, and was cremated at Golders Green Crematorium. He was succeeded in his titles by his son, David. Lady Strathcarron remarried in 1938, to Hedley Ernest Le Bas, son of Hedley Le Bas, and died in August 1956.

== Arms ==
Coat of arms of Ian Macpherson, 1st Baron Strathcarron
Crest A cat-a-mountain sejant guardant having its dexter paw raised Proper. Escutcheon Per fess Or and Azure a galley of the first masts oars and tacking Proper flagged Gules in the dexter chief point a hand couped fesswise holding a dagger palewise and in the sinister a cross crosslet fitchee of the last over all a fess chequy of the second and Argent. Supporters Dexter a private soldier of the Cameron Highlanders in full service dress of the period 1916-18 sinister a Macpherson clansman of the period of 1745. Motto Le Cridhe's Le Cliu

Parliament of the United Kingdom
Preceded by Galloway Weir	Member of Parliament for Ross and Cromarty; 1911–1935	Succeeded by Malcolm MacDonald
Political offices
Preceded by The Earl of Derby	Under-Secretary of State for War; 1916–1919	Succeeded by The Viscount Peel
Preceded by Edward Shortt	Chief Secretary for Ireland; 1919–1920	Succeeded by Sir Hamar Greenwood, Bt
Preceded by Laming Worthington-Evans	Minister of Pensions; 1920–1922	Succeeded by George Tryon
Peerage of the United Kingdom
New creation	Baron Strathcarron; 1936–1937	Succeeded by David Macpherson
Baronetage of the United Kingdom
New creation	Baronet (of Drumalban); 1933–1937	Succeeded by David Macpherson
