= Land league =

Land league may refer to:

- Irish National Land League
- Highland Land League
- Statute league
