= Sir David Dundas, 2nd Baronet =

British politician

Sir David Barnett Dundas, 2nd Baronet, QC, FRSE (28 August 1803 – 30 March 1877) was a Scottish advocate, Liberal politician and agricultural improver.

== Life ==
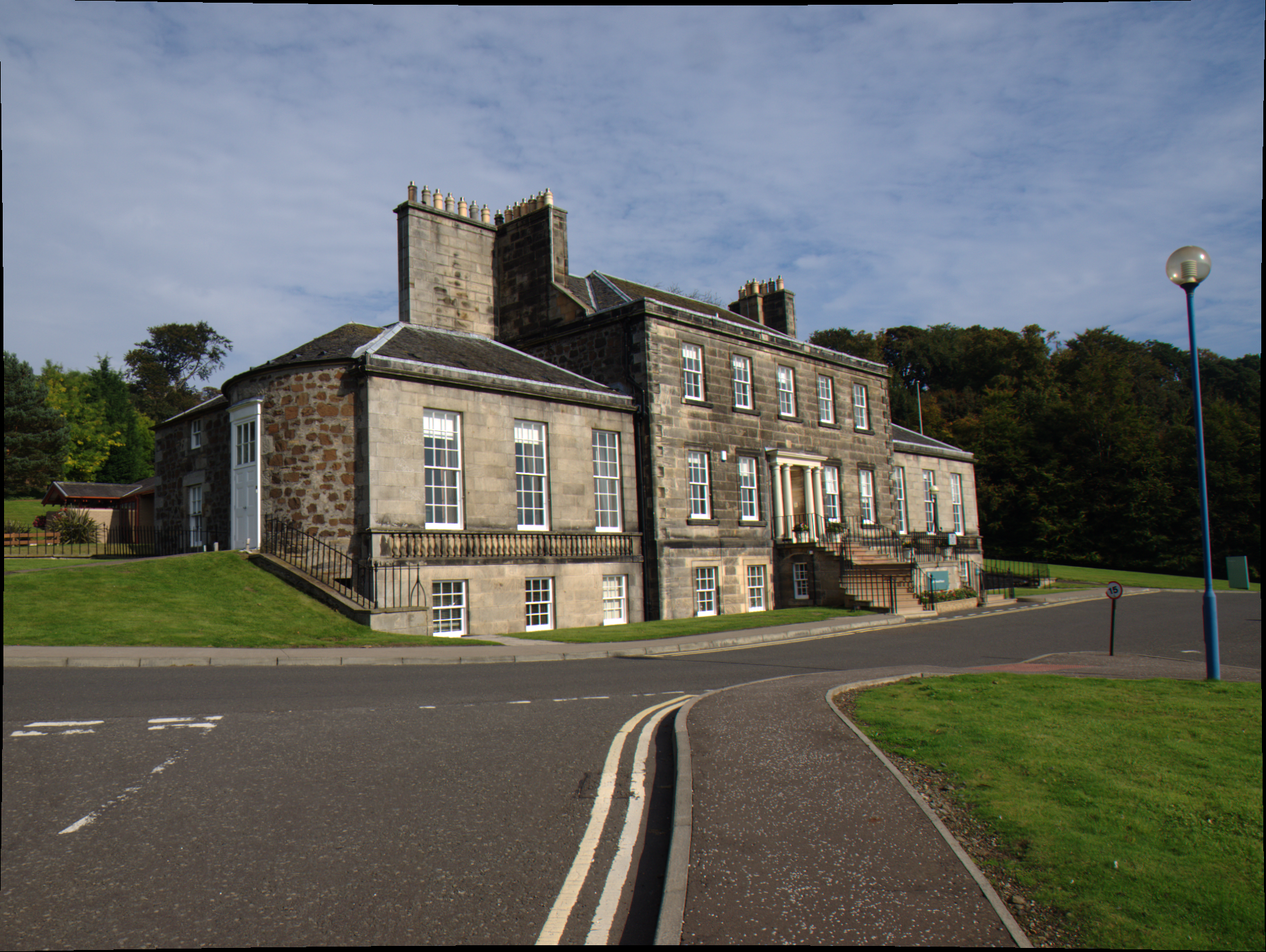
Beechwood House, west Edinburgh, birthplace of David Dundas

He was the son of Robert Dundas of Beechwood, 1st Baronet Dundas (1761–1835) and Matilda Cockburn (daughter of Archibald Cockburn). He was born at the family mansion of Beechwood House near Corstorphine, west Edinburgh on 28 August 1803. In 1824, he acquired Henry Dundas's estate of Dunira in Perthshire. On his father's death in 1835, David became the 2nd Baronet.

Dundas was educated at Westminster School and at Christ Church, Oxford. He was called to the Bar at the Inner Temple in 1824, and appointed Queen's Counsel in February 1840.

He was elected to represent Sutherland in Parliament as a Liberal in March 1840. In July 1846 he was appointed Solicitor General for England and Wales. At the time, it was the normal practice that accepting ministerial office caused a by-election; he was re-elected on 28 July.

In February 1846, he was knighted, a traditional perquisite of the office, but he resigned the position in March 1848 due to ill-health and returned to the backbenches. In May 1849, he was appointed Judge Advocate General, again re-elected in a by-election on 5 June, and made a member of the Privy Council on 29 June.

In 1851, he was elected a Fellow of the Royal Society of Edinburgh his proposer being John Cockburn, the wine merchant who founded Cockburns of Leith.

In 1852, he commissioned the architect William Burn to completely remodel the mansion at Dunira and lived there until the late 1860s.

He retired from politics in the 1852 general election, and was succeeded by the Marquess of Stafford, also a Liberal.

In retirement he lived and worked in his chambers at the Inner Temple; among other work, he served as a Trustee of the British Museum. His retirement from politics was not permanent; when Stafford was elevated to the House of Lords in March 1861 on becoming the third Duke of Sutherland, Dundas returned to Parliament. He stood down again in May 1867, being succeeded by Lord Ronald Sutherland-Leveson-Gower, the Duke's younger brother.

He died on 30 March 1877.

== Family ==
He married twice: firstly on 29 November 1841 to Catherine Whyte-Melville (d. 23 April 1856), sister of writer George John Whyte-Melville; secondly in 1858 to Lady Lucy Anne Pelham (1815–1901), daughter of Thomas Pelham, 2nd Earl of Chichester. Lucy was a gifted amateur artist.

He had seven children by his first marriage:

- Georgina Catherine Dundas (1843–1859)
- Robert Dundas (1844–1865), who died unmarried
- David Pelham Dundas (1845–1856), who died in childhood
- Sir Sydenham James Dundas, 3rd Baronet (1849–1904), who died unmarried
- Sir Charles Henry Dundas, 4th Baronet (1851–1908), who died unmarried
- Sir George Whyte Melville Dundas, 5th Baronet (1856–1934), who married Matilda Louisa Mary Wilson, and had children
- Lady Jane Dundas (died 1929), who married Reverend Francis Agnew Bickmore and had children

Dundas's second marriage produced a son. Sydenham Jaspar Dundas (1859–1909).

== Publications ==
- On the Potato Disease – Crop 1845 (1846)

Parliament of the United Kingdom
Preceded by William Howard	Member of Parliament for Sutherland; 1840–1852	Succeeded by The Marquess of Stafford
Preceded by The Marquess of Stafford	Member of Parliament for Sutherland; 1861–1867	Succeeded by Lord Ronald Sutherland-Leveson-Gower
Political offices
Preceded by John Jervis	Solicitor General; 1846–1848	Succeeded by Sir John Romilly
Preceded by William Goodenough Hayter	Judge Advocate General; 1849–1852	Succeeded by George Bankes
Baronetage of the United Kingdom
Preceded by Robert Dundas	Baronet (of Beechwood); 1835–1877	Succeeded by Sydenham Dundas
