= Frederick Leveson-Gower (Sutherland MP) =

British politician

Member of Parliament for Sutherland
- In office 1900–1906
- Preceded by: John MacLeod
- Succeeded by: Alpheus Morton

Personal details
- Born: Frederick Neville Sutherland Leveson-Gower; 31 May 1874
- Died: 9 April 1959 (aged 84)
- Party: Liberal Unionist
- Spouse: Blanche Lucie Gillard (m. 1916)

Frederick Neville Sutherland Leveson-Gower (31 May 1874 – 9 April 1959) was a British Liberal Unionist Party politician from the Leveson-Gower family.

Leveson-Gower was the son of Lord Albert Leveson-Gower, third son of George Sutherland-Leveson-Gower, 2nd Duke of Sutherland. His mother was Grace Emma Townshend Abdy, daughter of Sir Thomas Abdy, 1st Baronet. He entered Parliament for Sutherland in 1900, a seat he held until defeated by Alpheus Morton in the Liberal landslide of 1906. He was appointed a deputy lieutenant of Sutherland in 1905.

Leveson-Gower married Blanche Lucie Gillard in 1916. He died in April 1959, aged 84.

== See also ==
- Duke of Sutherland

== Notes ==
Parliament of the United Kingdom
Preceded by John MacLeod	Member of Parliament for Sutherland; 1900–1906	Succeeded by Alpheus Morton
