= George Greenwood =

British lawyer and politician (1850–1928)

Granville George Greenwood
- Portrait by Walter Stoneman, 1917
- Born: 3 January 1850; Kensington, England
- Died: 27 October 1928 (aged 78); London
- Education: Trinity College, Cambridge
- Occupations: Barrister; Politician; Writer
- Years active: 1876–1928
- Notable work: The Shakespeare Problem Restated
- Spouse: Fanny H. Welch

Sir Granville George Greenwood (3 January 1850 – 27 October 1928), usually known as George Greenwood or G. G. Greenwood, was an English lawyer, politician, cricketer, animal welfare campaigner and energetic advocate of the Shakespeare authorship question.

== Life and work ==
Born Granville George Greenwood, in Kensington, London, he was the second son of John Greenwood, Q. C. and Fanny Welch. Educated at Eton he was in the "select" for the Newcastle scholarship and then matriculated to Trinity College, Cambridge. As a foundation scholar, he took his degree with a first-class in the classical tripos in 1873. Having been called to the Bar by the Middle Temple in 1876, he joined the Western Circuit. He married in 1878 Laura, daughter of Dr. Cumberbatch and had one son and three daughters.

He contested Peterborough in 1886 and Central Hull in 1900. In 1906 he won Peterborough for the Liberal Party and held it till December 1915, when forced by rheumatism to retire. He was knighted in 1916. While he was in Parliament his consistent vigilance and practical knowledge were of great service. He was an outspoken advocate for the independence of India at a time when the Indian cause lacked effective voices within England.

Greenwood was also a cricketer and made a single first-class appearance, for Hampshire against Kent, in one of Hampshire's heaviest first-class defeats. Greenwood scored a single run in each innings of the match. His father John Greenwood and brother, Charles Greenwood, had equally brief first-class careers.

Greenwood died from heart failure at his residence in Linden Gardens, London. He was president of the Society for the Prevention of Premature Burial and left instructions that when he died his heart should be cut out.

== Animal welfare ==
Greenwood was an ardent supporter of animal welfare and was on the Council of the RSPCA for twenty years. He is credited with introducing the Protection of Animals Act 1911. He resigned from the council of RSPCA in November 1926. He resigned over his advanced age but also because Ada Cole had been dismissed from the Society for investigating the cruelty and slaughter of British horses being exported to Belgium. He disagreed with exporting horses to Belgium for slaughter and commented that "I have been a member of the council for many years... and do not agree with the line they are taking on many subjects".

Greenwood advocated for humane slaughter. He was a member of the Council of Justice to Animals (Humane Slaughter Association). He was a speaker with Henry S. Salt, Rev. Joseph Stratton and others at the International Anti-Vivisection and Animal Protection Congress held at Caxton Hall in 1909. He authored a chapter "The Cruelty of Sport" in the volume Killing for Sport published by George Bell & Sons for the Humanitarian League in 1915.

He was an opponent of blood sports and was the first president of the League for the Prohibition of Cruel Sports. In 1927, Amos resigned from the League in protest of Henry B. Amos' criticisms of the RSPCA. He disputed Amos' claim that the RSPCA was "the greatest stumbling-block" for the abolition of blood sports. Greenwood argued that the RSPCA only has limited powers, claiming "it cannot of itself bring in a Bill to suppress stag-hunting or other cruel sports, though it can, to some extent, support members of Parliament who present such Bills to the House of Commons". Greenwood died a year later after what Henry S. Salt described as a "stormy meeting of the RSPCA that heralded his final and fatal illness".

== Shakespeare authorship ==
Greenwood was also one of the most persistent and effective fighters in the Shakespeare authorship question, and published many books on the subject. He was a frequent correspondent to The Times, both on Shakespearean subjects and on the protection of animals.

Greenwood is the author of twelve books and numerous articles on the authorship question, all published 1908–1924. A prolific and entertaining writer, he engaged in a series of well-known public debates, carried on in books and in public forums of exchange such as newspapers and literary journals, with Sir Sidney Lee, the leading Shakespearean biographer of his generation. Although the most effective anti-Stratfordian of the early decades of the 20th century, Greenwood refused to endorse an alternative author of the Shakespearean canon, preferring instead to remain agnostic on the identity of the author while steadfastly maintaining that the traditional view of authorship was ultimately indefensible.

In 1922 he joined with J. Thomas Looney to establish The Shakespeare Fellowship, the organisation which subsequently carried forward public discussion of the authorship question up to the 1940s.

Newspaper obituaries for Greenwood published in 1928 described him as a "convinced believer in the Baconian theory of Shakespeare's works" and a "famous adherent of the Baconian theory". These descriptions were disputed by his widow, who wrote a letter commenting that Greenwood "most empathetically was not a Baconian" and that all his research led him to believe that it was "not proven" who authored Shakespeare's works but there were probably several authors.

== Selected publications ==
- The Faith of an Agnostic (1902)
- The Shakespeare Problem Restated (1908)
- In re Shakespeare: Beeching vs Greenwood (1909)
- The Vindicators of Shakespeare (1911)
- Is There a Shakespeare Problem? (1916)
- The Cruelty of Sport (1915)
- Letters to The Nation and the Literary Guide (1915–1916)
- Shakespeare's Law and Latin (1916)
- Shakespeare's Law (1920)
- Shakespeare's Handwriting (1920)
- Ben Jonson and Shakespeare (1921)
- Baconian Essays (Introduction and two essays) (1922)
- Lee, Shakespeare and a Tertium Quid (1923)
- Shakespeare's Signature and "Sir Thomas More" (1924)
- The Stratford Bust and the Droeshout Engraving (1925)

== Quotes ==
I cannot help the belief that, as thought and true civilisation advance, it will be recognised that to seek pleasure in the hunting of any animal to its death is unworthy of a thinking and humane man. If the humane man can do these things, it must be because he has not yet become a thinking man. If the thinking man can do them, it must be because he is not a humane man.

— George Greenwood, in 1915

Parliament of the United Kingdom
Preceded by Sir Robert Purvis	Member of Parliament for Peterborough; 1906 – 1918	Succeeded by Henry Brassey
