= Galloway Weir =

British politician

James Galloway Weir

James Galloway Weir (6 July 1839 – 18 May 1911) was a Scottish businessman and Liberal Party politician.

== Biography ==
Born in Scotland, he was the son of a builder, James Ross Weir. He was a pupil at Dollar Academy before moving with his family to London as a young man. He worked as a travelling salesman for a haberdashery company before he went into business on his own account in 1863 importing sewing machines. He retired from business in about 1879/80 to pursue politics full-time. Weir's brother, John Weir became the secretary of the Fife and Kinross Miners' Association.

He unsuccessfully contested the Falkirk Burghs constituency in 1885, when he got a derisory vote. He was elected for Ross and Cromarty as one of five Crofters' Party MPs in 1892, transferring his allegiance to the mainstream Liberal Party in 1895. He held the seat until his death.

He was also elected to the London County Council in 1892 to represent Islington East as a member of the majority Liberal-backed Progressive Party.

He died at his home in Frognal, Hampstead in 1911 aged 71, and was buried at Marylebone Cemetery.

General election 1892: Ross and Cromarty Shire
| Party | Candidate | Votes | % | ±% |
|---|---|---|---|---|
| Liberal | Galloway Weir | 3,171 | | |
| Liberal Unionist | N. McLean | 2,413 | | |

General election 1895: Ross and Cromarty Shire
| Party | Candidate | Votes | % | ±% |
|---|---|---|---|---|
| Liberal | Galloway Weir | 3,272 | | |
| Conservative | Randle Jackson | 2,413 | | |

General election 1900: Ross and Cromarty Shire
| Party | Candidate | Votes | % | ±% |
|---|---|---|---|---|
| Liberal | Galloway Weir | 3,554 | | |
| Liberal Unionist | I.D. Fletcher | 1,651 | | |

General election 1906: Ross and Cromarty Shire
| Party | Candidate | Votes | % | ±% |
|---|---|---|---|---|
| Liberal | Galloway Weir | 3,883 | | |
| Conservative | J.C. Watt KC | 1,773 | | |

General election Jan 1910: Ross and Cromarty Shire
| Party | Candidate | Votes | % | ±% |
|---|---|---|---|---|
| Liberal | Galloway Weir | 4,430 | | |
| Liberal Unionist | Neil Maclean | 1,418 | | |

General election Dec 1910: Ross and Cromarty Shire
| Party | Candidate | Votes | % | ±% |
|---|---|---|---|---|
| Liberal | Galloway Weir | unopposed | | |

Parliament of the United Kingdom
| Preceded by Roderick Macdonald | Member of Parliament for Ross and Cromarty; 1892 – 1911 | Succeeded by Ian Macpherson |
