= David Macpherson, 2nd Baron Strathcarron =

British racing driver and peer

The Right Honourable: The Lord Strathcarron

Member of the House of Lords
- Lord Temporal
- Hereditary peerage 14 August 1937 – 11 November 1999
- Preceded by: Ian Macpherson, 1st Baron Strathcarron
- Succeeded by: Abolished

Personal details
- Born: 23 January 1924
- Died: 31 August 2006 (aged 82)
- Spouse: Diana
- Children: 2, including Ian Macpherson, 3rd Baron Strathcarron
- Parent: Ian Macpherson, 1st Baron Strathcarron

David William Anthony Blyth Macpherson, 2nd Baron Strathcarron (23 January 1924 – 31 August 2006), was best known as the "motorcycling peer". He inherited the Barony on his father's death in 1937, but lost his seat in the House of Lords with the passage of the House of Lords Act 1999.

Lord Strathcarron's father was Ian Macpherson, a government minister in the cabinet of Lloyd George who had been created Baron Strathcarron, of Banchor, in 1936. He attended Eton College and Jesus College, Cambridge. After the outbreak of the Second World War, he joined the RAF in 1941, before he graduated, and flew Wellingtons for Coastal Command on reconnaissance and search-and-rescue missions over the Atlantic Ocean, during the Battle of the Atlantic. He then flew long-range transport missions, and was demobbed in 1947. He continued to fly as a private pilot after the war, until the 1980s.

His interest in motor vehicles began in his youth, when he learned to drive in his mother's 1932 Essex Terraplane. He was bought a Morgan Super Sports for his sixteenth birthday, in which he quickly passed his motorcycle test, but then also soon had his first driving accident. He raced motor vehicles after the war, competing against Stirling Moss in 500cc motor racing, and drove for Marwyn and Kieft. He raced vintage cars from his own collection, including Alfa Romeos, Austin-Healeys, Bentleys, Jensens and Rileys. He was the motoring correspondent of The Field from 48 years, from 1954 to 2002. He founded an automotive supplies business, Strathcarron & Co, in 1960. In 1963, he wrote an account of his experiences in motor racing, entitled Motoring for Pleasure. He won the Lords versus Commons motor race at Brands Hatch in 2000, aged 76. After he retired as motoring correspondent of The Field in 2002, he wrote a column for the website Hoot! entitled "View from a Peer".

During his time in Parliament, Lord Strathcarron was involved in many motoring issues, and was chairman of the All-Party Parliamentary Motorcycling Group. He was involved in working with the Motor Cycle Industry Association to create the system of Compulsory Basic Training for learner motorcyclists, introduced in December 1990. He usually voted with the Conservative Party, but rarely spoke.

Outside Parliament, he was a President of the Guild of Motoring Writers, President of the Jensen Owners' Club and Fellow of the Institute of Advanced Motorists. He was also involved with the British Racing Drivers' Club, the Guild of Experienced Motorists, the Vintage Sports Car Club, the Driving Instructors' Association, the Vehicle Builders and Repairers' Association, the Institute of Road Transport Engineers, the Institute of the Motor Industry and the Order of the Road.

He died seven weeks after a motorcycling accident involving a dustcart. His obituary in The Daily Telegraph described him as "an engaging amalgam of Mr Punch, Bertie Wooster and Mr Toad". He married four times, and was survived by his fourth wife, Diana. The title was inherited by Ian Macpherson, 3rd Baron Strathcarron, the elder of the two sons from his second marriage.

== Arms ==
Coat of arms of David Macpherson, 2nd Baron Strathcarron
Crest A cat-a-mountain sejant guardant having its dexter paw raised Proper. Escutcheon Per fess Or and Azure a galley of the first masts oars and tacking Proper flagged Gules in the dexter chief point a hand couped fesswise holding a dagger palewise and in the sinister a cross crosslet fitchee of the last over all a fess chequy of the second and Argent. Supporters Dexter a private soldier of the Cameron Highlanders in full service dress of the period 1916-18 sinister a Macpherson clansman of the period of 1745. Motto Le Cridhe's Le Cliu

Peerage of the United Kingdom
Preceded by Ian Macpherson	Baron Strathcarron; 1937–2006	Succeeded by Ian Macpherson
Baronetage of the United Kingdom
Preceded by Ian Macpherson	Baronet (of Drumalban); 1937–2006	Succeeded by Ian Macpherson
