= Alasdair Mackenzie =

Alasdair Roderick Mackenzie (3 August 1903 – 8 November 1970) was a Scottish farmer and politician who became a Liberal Party member of parliament.

A Gaelic speaker, he went to Broadford Junior Secondary School on the Isle of Skye. He became a farmer, and was active in the National Farmers Union, being President of the East Ross branch for two years. He was elected to Ross-shire County Council in 1935 on which he served for twenty years; on leaving the council he was a member of the Crofters' Commission for five years.

At the 1964 general election Mackenzie was elected, at the age of 61 and contesting his first parliamentary election, as a Liberal for Ross and Cromarty. He defeated the sitting National Liberal obtaining a majority of 1407 votes. He was re-elected in 1966 but defeated at the 1970 general election. Mackenzie had been party spokesman in the Commons on Agriculture and Fisheries and posts and telecommunications. He differed from the majority of his party in opposing United Kingdom membership of the European Economic Community. He was the lone Liberal voting against the Labour government at the end of debate on the Common Market. He was also out of step with the mainstream party on the issue of capital punishment. He was a principal supporter of the campaign to re-instate the death penalty for the murder of police or prison officers led by Conservative MP, Duncan Sandys in 1966 In 1970 he was appointed to the Scottish Agricultural Advisory Committee but died later that year.

Parliament of the United Kingdom
Preceded by Sir John MacLeod	Member of Parliament for Ross and Cromarty; 1964–1970	Succeeded by Hamish Gray
