= John MacLeod (Ross and Cromarty MP) =

British army officer, tweed designer and politician

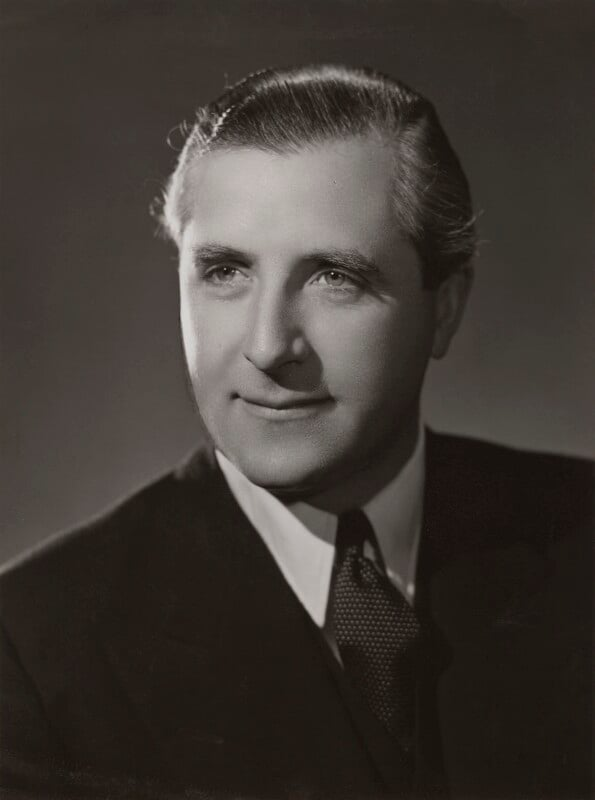
MacLeod in 1949

Sir John MacLeod TD (23 February 1913 – 3 June 1984) was a British army officer, tweed designer, and politician who was a Member of Parliament in the Scottish highlands for 19 years.

== Family ==
MacLeod's family were from the Isle of Skye where his father owned Skeabost. Jacko, as the family called him, was the youngest son of Duncan MacLeod CBE who had interests in the whisky industry. MacLeod was sent to Fettes College in Edinburgh for his education. In 1938, he married Rosemary Theodora Hamilton Wills from a Gloucestershire family. The couple had two sons and three daughters. He managed a centre that sold items woven by crofters on the family's land.

== Army service ==
In 1935, MacLeod had joined the Territorial division of the Cameron Highlanders. During the Second World War, he served as a captain with the 51st Highland Division in France in 1940 and was taken prisoner in June at Saint-Valery-en-Caux when the Division surrendered. He spent the rest of the war as a Prisoner of war.

== Election to Parliament ==
When repatriated at the end of the war, MacLeod avidly read, The Times, for 3 weeks to get up to speed on British affairs before entering into politics as a candidate for Ross and Cromarty in the 1945 general election. MacLeod was adopted by the Ross-shire Liberal Association, which was not affiliated to the Liberal Party or the National Liberal Party; thereupon, he declared himself a supporter of Winston Churchill. Most of the press designated him as a Liberal National and he faced a straight fight with the Labour Party to succeed Malcolm MacDonald. MacLeod had no difficulty in being elected, winning with a majority of 4,102. MacLeod had intended to take the Liberal whip in support of Sir Archie Sinclair, the Liberal leader, who represented the neighbouring constituency, but Sinclair was narrowly defeated in the same election.

== Parliamentary contributions ==
MacLeod concentrated on constituency interests including hill farming during his time in Parliament. In 1947, he led the textile group of the Highlands Advisory Panel which organised a tour of the area for the Secretary of State for Scotland and a group of experts; their aim was to build up the industry. Because of his specialist interests, he was a low-profile MP.

== Transport concerns ==
Starting at the 1950 general election, MacLeod described himself as a "Liberal and Conservative" candidate, the National Liberals having merged with the Conservative Party. From 1951, he was an official candidate and he backed the Conservatives in Parliament; however, on issues which he felt adversely affected his constituents, he was willing to break party lines.

One such issue was transport. In 1954, he joined with 5 other Scottish Conservative MPs to move for the annulment of a 10% increase in rail freight charges. He was highly critical of Ernest Marples in the early 1960s, asking rhetorically in 1963, "Has the Minister given up on the Highlands altogether?"; later that year MacLeod abstained, rather than support, the Beeching Axe of lesser-used rail services.

MacLeod also pressed for better roads and more roads around the highlands, particularly on the basis of improving tourism. In 1960, he moved a motion condemning the state drink monopoly in three Scottish towns (Annan, Dingwall and Invergordon) created during the First World War and obtained all-party support for its ending.

== Defeat ==
Despite his rebelliousness, MacLeod's standing in his local community was recognised when he was Knighted in the Queen's Birthday Honours List in 1963. He was, however, defeated at the 1964 general election by the Liberal Party candidate Alasdair Mackenzie where he thereupon left politics. He returned to the tweed looms of Portree where he designed many new patterns which he continued to sell across the world. MacLeod's later years were dominated by a long illness.

== Bibliography ==
- Sir David Wills, "Sir John Macleod" (Obituary), The Times, 10 July 1984.
- "Who Was Who", A & C Black

Parliament of the United Kingdom
Preceded by Malcolm MacDonald	Member of Parliament for Ross and Cromarty; 1945–1964	Succeeded by Alasdair Mackenzie
