= Sir Robert Dundas, 1st Baronet =

Scottish landowner and lawyer (1761–1835)

Sir Robert Dundas, 1st Baronet of Beechwood FRSE (30 June 1761 – 4 January 1835) was a Scottish landowner and lawyer.

== Life ==
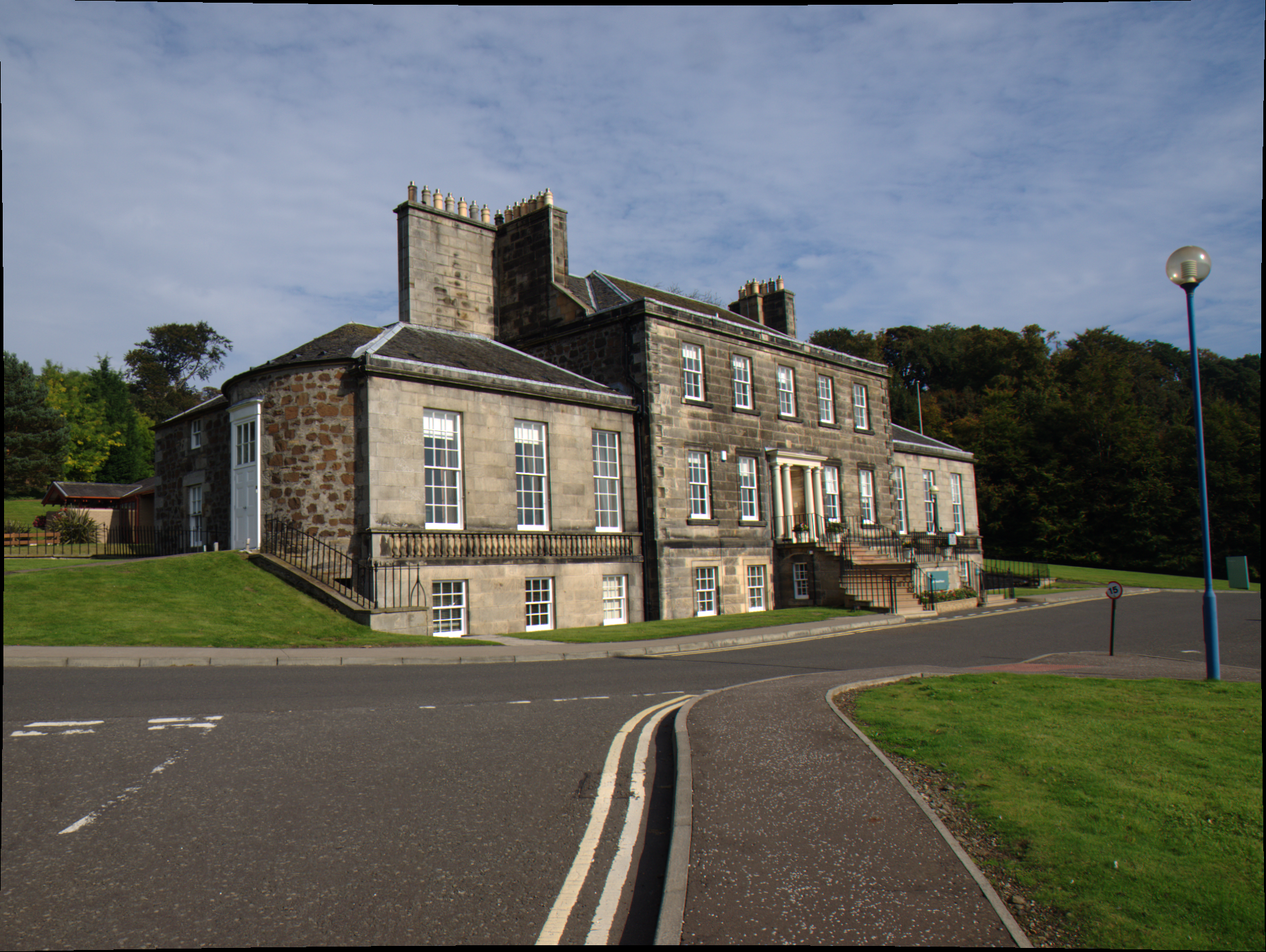
Beechwood House, in west Edinburgh

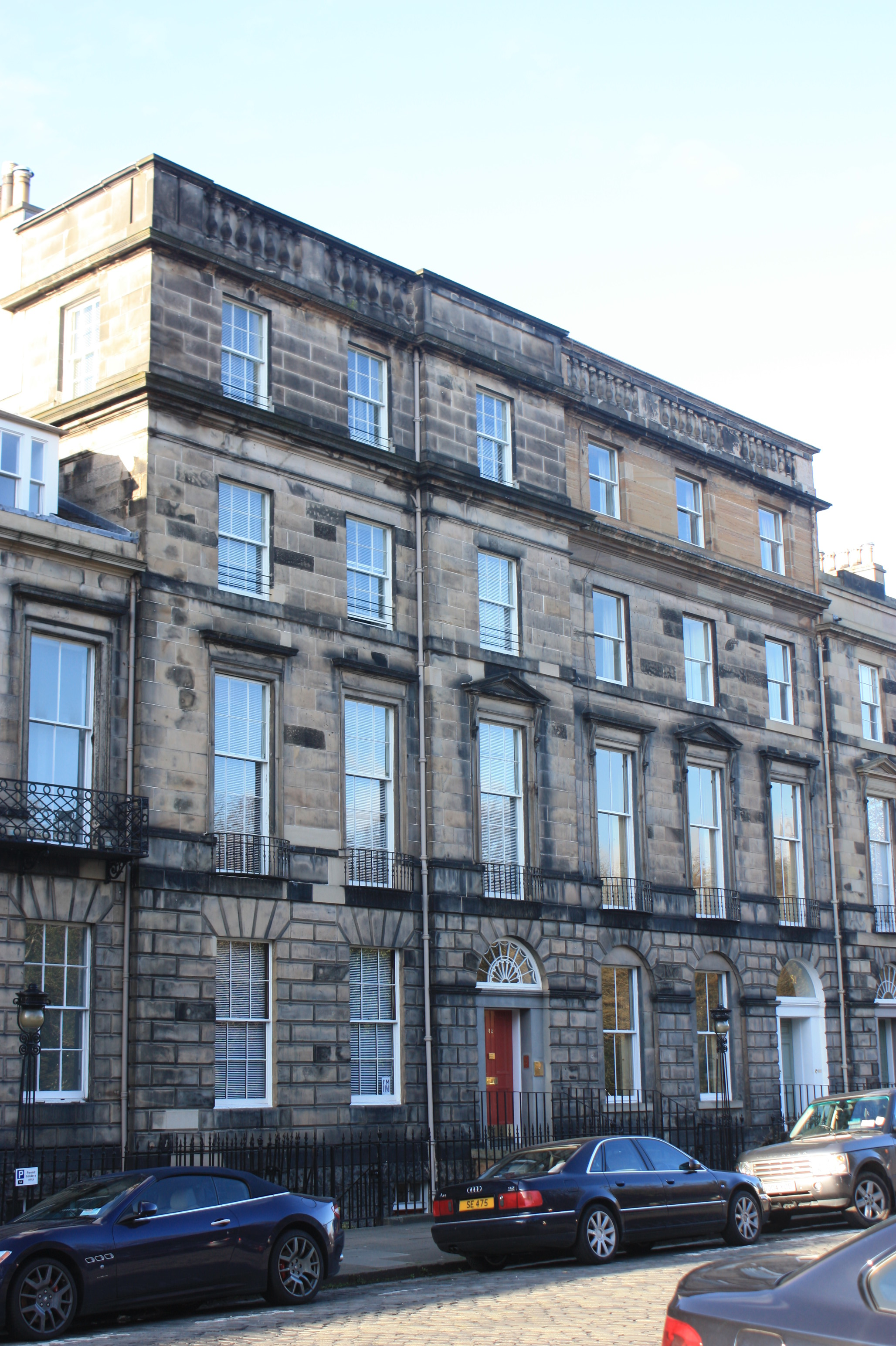
32 Heriot Row, Edinburgh

He was born on 30 June 1761, the son of Elizabeth (née Turnbull) and the Rev Robert Dundas of Humbie in East Lothian. Descended from a legal dynasty, he was trained as a lawyer, probably at the University of Edinburgh, and with a legal apprenticeship under James Balfour, and became a Writer to the Signet in 1785. He was Principal Clerk of Session to the Edinburgh High Courts 1817 to 1830. In 1820, he was Deputy to the Lord Privy Seal of Scotland.

In 1820, upon the death of his uncle General Sir David Dundas, he inherited the estate of Beechwood near Corstorphine in western Edinburgh.

In 1824, he acquired the huge Dunira estate in Perthshire, but appears to have passed it immediately to his son, David Dundas. The estate had belonged to the late Henry Dundas, Viscount Melville who had died in 1811. Lord Melville was his second cousin, once removed, being both descended from James Dundas, Lord Arniston (albeit from different marriages).

Dundas was created a Baronet of Beechwood in the County of Midlothian on 24 August 1821.

In 1823, he was elected a Fellow of the Royal Society of Edinburgh, his proposer being Sir William Arbuthnot, 1st Baronet during his second term as Lord Provost of Edinburgh.

He died at his Edinburgh townhouse, 32 Heriot Row. on 4 January 1835.

== Family ==
He married Matilda Cockburn, daughter of Janet Rennie and her husband, Archibald Cockburn (1738–1820), descended in the female line from the Dundas family.

They had seven daughters and one son, David Barnett Dundas. Their daughter, Robina Mary Dundas (d. 1905), married her distant cousin Vice Admiral Henry Dundas, son of Robert Dundas of Arniston. Their daughter Jane Dundas married George Whigham of Lochpatrick; they would become the parents of David Dundas Whigham, who in turn was the grandfather of Margaret Campbell, Duchess of Argyll.

== Artistic recognition ==
He was portrayed by Sir Thomas Lawrence, one of Britain's foremost portrait painters of his day.

Baronetage of the United Kingdom
New creation	Baronet (of Beechwood); 1821–1835	Succeeded by David Dundas
