= William Templeton (British politician) =

Scottish Unionist Party politician

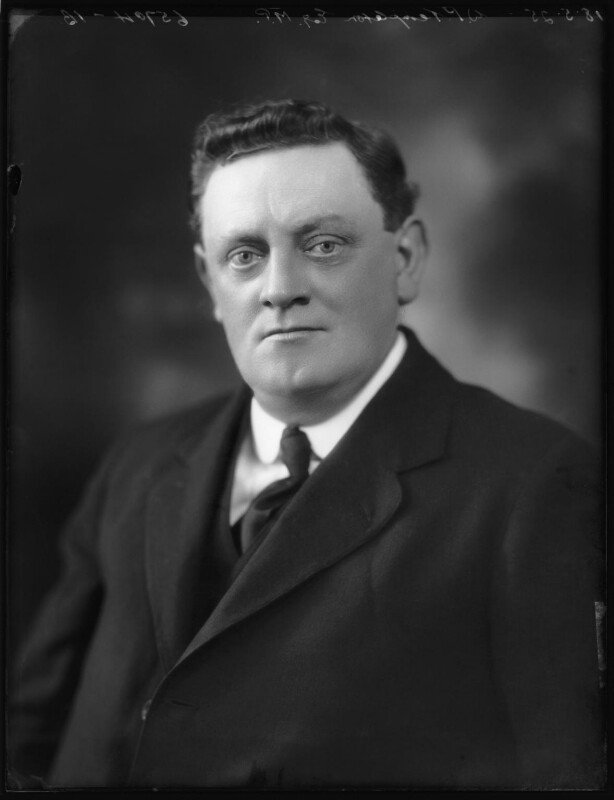
Templeton in 1925

William Paterson Templeton (8 November 1876 – 4 July 1938) was a Scottish Unionist Party politician. He was a member of the Orange Order.

A native of Camlachie, Glasgow, Templeton was a wood turner by trade. Before entering Parliament, Templeton was the first organising secretary of the Unionist Workers' League and a speaker for the Tariff Reform League.

He contested Ross and Cromarty in 1911 and sat as member of parliament for Banffshire from 1924 until 1929. He was unsuccessful in Glasgow Shettleston at a 1930 by-election and sat for Coatbridge from 1931 until 1935.

In 1934, he, alongside Captain Herbert Moss MP and former Glasgow town councillor Thomas MacKenzie, was convicted of contravening the Lotteries Act 1710 in connection to the Modern School of Art Union Cesarewitch draw. Templeton was fined £25 (equivalent to £1,547 in 2025).

Parliament of the United Kingdom
Preceded by Charles Barrie	Member of Parliament for Banffshire; 1924–1929	Succeeded by Murdoch McKenzie Wood
Preceded by James C. Welsh	Member of Parliament for Coatbridge; 1931–1935	Succeeded by James Barr
