= Thomas Mackenzie (Scottish politician) =

Member of Parliament for Ross and Cromarty
- In office 18 April 1837 – 10 August 1847
- Preceded by: James Alexander Stewart-Mackenzie
- Succeeded by: James Matheson

Personal details
- Born: 1793
- Died: 9 June 1856 (aged 62–63)
- Party: Conservative

Thomas Mackenzie (1793 – 9 June 1856) was a British Conservative Party politician.

Mackenzie was elected Conservative MP for Ross and Cromarty at a by-election in 1837—caused by the resignation of James Alexander Stewart-Mackenzie—and held the seat until 1847 when he did not seek re-election.

Parliament of the United Kingdom
Preceded by James Alexander Stewart-Mackenzie	Member of Parliament for Ross and Cromarty; 1837–1847	Succeeded by James Matheson
