= Hamish Gray, Baron Gray of Contin =

British politician (1927–2006)

The Right Honourable The Lord Gray of Contin PC DL

Minister of State for Scotland
- In office 13 June 1983 – 11 September 1986
- Monarch: Elizabeth II
- Prime Minister: Margaret Thatcher
- Preceded by: The Earl of Mansfield
- Succeeded by: The Lord Glenarthur

Minister of State for Energy
- In office 7 May 1979 – 13 June 1983
- Monarch: Elizabeth II
- Prime Minister: Margaret Thatcher
- Preceded by: Dickson Mabon
- Succeeded by: Alick Buchanan-Smith

Member of the House of Lords
- Lord Temporal
- Life peerage 4 July 1983 – 14 March 2006

Member of Parliament for Ross and Cromarty
- In office 18 June 1970 – 13 May 1983
- Preceded by: Alasdair Mackenzie
- Succeeded by: constituency abolished

Personal details
- Born: 28 June 1927
- Died: 14 March 2006 (aged 78)
- Party: Conservative

James Hector Northey "Hamish" Gray, Baron Gray of Contin, PC, DL (28 June 1927 – 14 March 2006) was a Scottish Conservative politician and life peer.

Gray was born in Inverness and educated at the Inverness Royal Academy. His father owned an Inverness roofing firm. He was commissioned into the Queen's Own Cameron Highlanders in 1945 and served in India, during partition. He married Judith Waite Brydon in 1953 and they had two sons and a daughter.

He was elected as an Independent member of Inverness Council in 1965 and at the 1970 general election he was elected to Parliament as the Conservative and Unionist Party Member of Parliament (MP) for Ross and Cromarty. He was appointed to the Whips' Office in 1971, and he served as a front bench Energy spokesman (1975–1979). Upon the Conservatives' return to government in 1979, he was appointed as the Minister of State for Energy under David Howell, where he remained until the 1983 general election, when he was defeated in the new Ross, Cromarty and Skye constituency by the SDP candidate Charles Kennedy.

He was appointed a privy counsellor in the 1982 Birthday Honours, and made a life peer in 1983, taking the title Baron Gray of Contin, of Contin, in the District of Ross and Cromarty, and was Minister of State for Scotland from 1983 to 1986.

He served Inverness as Deputy lieutenant (1989), Vice Lord Lieutenant (1994) and Lord-lieutenant (1996–2002).

He died on 14 March 2006 at a hospice in Inverness after a long battle with cancer.

Parliament of the United Kingdom
Preceded by Alasdair Mackenzie	Member of Parliament for Ross and Cromarty; 1970–1983	Constituency abolished
Honorary titles
Preceded by Lachlan Mackintosh	Lord Lieutenant of Inverness-shire; 1996–2002	Succeeded by Donald Angus Cameron
