= Roderick Macdonald (politician) =

Scottish medical doctor and politician

Roderick Macdonald FRCS

Member of Parliament for Ross and Cromarty
- In office 1885–1892
- Preceded by: Ronald Munro Ferguson
- Succeeded by: Galloway Weir

Personal details
- Born: 1840 Isle of Skye, Scotland
- Died: 1894 (aged 53–54) Middlesex, England
- Party: Crofters'
- Other political affiliations: Liberal
- Spouse: Frances Emma Maryon Perceval (m. 1890; died 1893)
- Occupation: Medical doctor; politician

Roderick Macdonald, FRCS (1840–1894) was a Scottish medical doctor and a Crofters Party politician. As a coroner he presided over the inquest of one of the victims in the Whitechapel murders.

Macdonald was the son of Angus Macdonald, a house carpenter, of Fairy Bridge, Skye. He was educated at the Free Church Normal School, Glasgow, and the University of Glasgow. Later he was a teacher at the Free Church School, Lonmore. He then studied medicine and was LRCP and LRCS, Edinburgh in 1867. He was also a member of the Inner Temple.

He practised medicine in the East End of London, and was the divisional surgeon for the police in the Isle of Dogs.

In 1885 Macdonald was elected as the Member of Parliament (MP) for Ross and Cromarty in the crofter's interest. He held the seat until he stood down at the 1892 election. Around 1887, he was elected as coroner for the north-east part of East Middlesex. He presided over the inquest into the death of Mary Jane Kelly, one of the victims in the Whitechapel murders, at Shoreditch Town Hall on 12 November 1888.

On 28 January 1890 Macdonald married Frances Emma Maryon Perceval (20 July 1868 – 15 March 1893), a great-granddaughter of Spencer Perceval. He lived at 65 West Ferry Road, Millwall, and later at 252 Camden Road, Middlesex, where he died from cancer, at age 54.

Parliament of the United Kingdom
Preceded by Ronald Munro Ferguson	Member of Parliament for Ross and Cromarty; 1885 – 1892	Succeeded by Galloway Weir
