= Strathcarron Sports Cars =

British auto maker

Strathcarron Sports Cars plc was a British car manufacturer based in Hove, East Sussex, in business from 1998 until 2001.

== Company overview ==
Strathcarron produced two models while in business between 1999 and 2002, the Strathcarron SC-5A, and the Strathcarron SC-6, which in essence was the same as the SC-5A, only with ABS plastic bodywork in place of the more expensive kevlar and carbon fiber. The company's founder, Ian Macpherson, now Lord Strathcarron, is the son of David Macpherson who was a noted motorcyclist and automotive columnist. The goal for the company was to build simple and lightweight cars powered by motorcycle engines. The cars were designed by Reynard and used Triumph motorcycle engines and were minimalist in terms of options and amenities.

Initially, the company planned to send 50 to 60 cars out of their factory once the firm was fully up and running during the year 2000. However, due to changes in the UK's Single Vehicle Approval laws during the time Strathcarron was beginning to sell the cars to customers, the company had to go back and reconsider using the engine out of an automobile in order to legally sell the car for public roadway use. An attempt was made to use the Rover K-Series motor, but financial hardship forced the company to shut down before a working prototype could be completed and road tested.

== SC-5A specifications ==
- Dimensions
  - Length: 142 in (3,607 mm)
  - Width: 67 in (1,702 mm)
  - Wheelbase: 94 in (2,388 mm)
  - Wheel Track (Front): 58.4 in (1,483 mm)
  - Wheel Track (Rear): 57.5 in (1,460 mm)
  - Weight: 1,213 lb (550.2 kg)
  - Seating Capacity: 2
- Powertrain
  - Engine Type: Inline 4
  - Displacement: 1,200 cc (1.2 L; 73.2 cu in)
  - Sourced from: Triumph Trophy 1200 motorcycle
  - Valves: 16 valves/4 per cylinder
  - Horsepower: 125 hp (93 kW)
  - HP-to-Weight Ratio: 9.3 lb (4.2 kg) per hp
  - Transmission: 6-speed manual (Sequential)
  - Drive Wheels: Rear
  - Engine Placement: Mid-Engined
- Handling
  - Wheels: Front 16x6 - rear 16x7
  - Tires: Front 205/55/16 - Rear 215/50/17
  - Brakes: Brembo vented discs with AP brake calipers
  - Steering: Unassisted rack-and-pinion
- Performance
  - 0-60 mph Time: 5.6 seconds

== See also ==
- List of car manufacturers of the United Kingdom
