= Highland Land League =

Political group active in the 1880s and 1890s

The emblem of the Highland Land Law Reform Association

The first Highland Land League (Scottish Gaelic: Dionnasg an Fhearainn) emerged as a distinct political force in Scotland during the 1880s, with its power base in the country's Highlands and Islands. It was known also as the Highland Land Law Reform Association and the Crofters' Party. It was consciously modelled on the Irish Land League.

The Highland Land League was successful in getting Members of Parliament (MPs) elected in 1885 (in the 1885 general election). As a parliamentary force, it was dissipated by the Crofters' Holdings (Scotland) Act 1886 and by the way the Liberal Party was seen to adopt Land League objectives. Similarly to its Irish predecessor, the Land League also used direct action tactics to resist both rackrenting and mass evictions by the Anglo-Scottish landlords of the Highlands and the use of the same tactics was to continue into 20th century. The Land League's tactics included rent strikes, boycotting, and land occupations by crofters, cottars and squatters. Perhaps the Land League's best known Gaelic slogan was "Is treasa tuath na tighearna", (lit. "The people are mightier than a lord." fig. "The whole Clan is mightier than the Chief.")

== Background ==
By the 1880s the common people or peasantry of the Highlands and Islands had been cleared from large areas of their ancestral lands, the clearances (known as the Highland Clearances) having occurred during the decades following the Battle of Culloden in 1746. Many emigrated at that time to Canada, Australia and other British colonies, but also to the US and closer to home, many moved to the new industrial towns in Scotland's developing Central Belt. Many who did not leave were crammed into crofting (pieces of land surrounded by legislation) townships on very small areas of land where they were openly abused and exploited by their landlords. Many lacked even crofts of their own and became cottars and squatters on the crofts of other people. Landlords turned most of the land over to use as sheep farms and hunting parks called deer forests. In addition, in the 1880s, the Highlands and Islands were recently ravaged by the potato famine of the mid 19th century. The 1880s were also a time, however, of growing democracy and of government which was increasingly responsive to public opinion, particularly after the electoral reform Act of 1884. As many crofters in the Scottish Highlands newly qualified as £10 occupiers, the Act empowered Scottish Gaels to form the Crofters' Party and Highland Land League.

In the early 1880s, in terms of gaining sympathetic public opinion, crofters were protesting very effectively, with rent strikes and land raids, about their lack of secure tenure of land and their severely reduced access to land. The government responded in 1883 with a commission of enquiry headed by Francis Napier, and the Napier Commission published recommendations in 1884. Napier's report fell a long way short of addressing crofters' demands and it stimulated a new wave of protests.

== The Crofters' Party ==
The earlier protests had been largely confined to Skye. In 1884 protest action was much more widespread, many thousands of crofters became members of the Highland Land League and among the list of MPs elected in the 1885 United Kingdom general election there were Crofters' Party MPs elected by the constituencies of Argyllshire (Donald Horne Macfarlane), Inverness-shire (Charles Fraser-Mackintosh), Ross and Cromarty (Roderick Macdonald) and Caithness (Gavin Brown Clark). At Wick Burghs John Macdonald Cameron was also allied with the Crofters Party. A year later Parliament created the Crofters Act.

== The Crofters' Holdings (Scotland) Act 1886 ==
The Crofters' Holdings (Scotland) Act 1886 (49 & 50 Vict. c. 29) applied to croft tenure in an area which is now recognisable as a definition of the Highlands and Islands: that of the ancient counties of Argyll, Inverness-shire, Ross and Cromarty, Sutherland, Caithness, Orkney and Shetland. (The name is used now as a name for an electoral area of the Scottish Parliament: please see Highlands and Islands). The Act granted security of tenure of existing crofts and established the first Crofters Commission (The same name was given to a different body in 1955). The Crofters Commission had rent-fixing powers. Rents were generally reduced and 50% or more of outstanding arrears were cancelled. The Act failed however to address the issue of severely limited access to land, and crofters renewed their protest actions. At the same time there was a shift in the political climate: William Gladstone's Liberal government fell from power; the new Conservative government was much less sympathetic to the plight of crofters and much more willing to use troops to quell protests. The Liberal Party appeared to adopt and champion Land League objectives and, as a distinct parliamentary force, the Land League fragmented during the 1890s. On the issue of access to land, therefore, little real progress was to be made until after the First World War.

Some resources were put into development of the communications infrastructure of the Highlands and Islands (roads, railways, and harbours) and, in the early years of the 20th century the Congested Districts Board was able to push through the establishment of new crofting townships on Skye and in the Strathnaver area of Sutherland. The Congested Districts Board was created in 1897 and can be seen as a precursor to the Highlands and Islands Development Board, which is known now as Highland and Islands Enterprise (HIE).

A new Liberal government, elected in 1906 (in the 1906 general election), abolished the Congested Districts Board and created the Board of Agriculture for Scotland. The new board's principal task was supposed to be that of pressing forward with land reform in the Highlands and Islands. It was largely ineffective. By 1913 crofters were again staging land raids.

== Second League in 1909 ==
Meanwhile, in Glasgow, in 1909, a second Highland Land League was formed as a political party. This organisation was a broadly left-wing group that sought the restoration of deer forests to public ownership, abolition of plural farms and the nationalisation of the land. Also they resolved to resolutely defend crofters facing eviction by their landlords and they supported home rule for Scotland.

During the First World War (1914 to 1918) politicians made lavish promises about reform which would follow the war, and of course many crofters died in the war itself. After the war the words of politicians did not translate into immediate action, but crofters returning from the war were in no mood to accept government inaction. Land raids began again. To set this Scottish Highland political radicalism in context, the 1916 Easter Rising was recent history in Ireland, as were the Liberal February Revolution and the Communist October Revolution in Russia, not to mention the socialist Kiel mutiny, which helped end the First World War and bring about the German Revolution. With these other events in mind, the Highland Land League, although radical, were positively gentle in their politics compared to radicals in other countries around the same time.

In August 1918 the new Land League had affiliated with the Labour Party, with four candidates for the 1918 general election being joint League-Labour. By the 1920s they had fully merged with Labour, under the promise of autonomy for Scotland were Labour to gain power in the forthcoming years, which however remained unfulfilled, presumably at least partly because although Labour succeeded in forming a government, they failed to gain a majority in the House of Commons.

== Subsequent history ==
Land League members were then key to the formation of the Scottish National Party in 1934. When faced with new land raids the government responded by giving the Board of Agriculture the money and powers to do something like what had been promised. The Board's work was assisted by a downturn in the profitability of sheep farming and, by the late 1920s, perhaps 50,000 acres (20,000 hectares; 200 square kilometres) of arable land and 750,000 acres (300,000 ha; 3,000 km^{2}) of hill pasture had been given over to establishing new crofts. Most of the new crofts were in the Hebrides, the area where Gaelic best survives into the present day. Crofters benefited also in parts of Caithness, Sutherland, Shetland, and various other localities.

Crofting is still a distinct lifestyle today, and the Scottish Crofting Federation continues to represent crofters.
