= Angus Sutherland (politician) =

Angus Sutherland CB (1848 – 16 January 1922) was a Scottish Liberal politician.

Angus was the son of William Sutherland, a crofter whose parents had suffered eviction as a consequence of the Highland Clearances. He grew up in Helmsdale and was educated at the parish school. He went on to Edinburgh Training College and Glasgow University. He taught in Aberfeldy and later became tutor to John Sinclair who was later to become Secretary for Scotland from 1905 to 1912. In 1885 he stood as crofter's candidate for the parliamentary seat of Sutherland against the incumbent member, the Marquess of Stafford, who was eldest son of the Duke of Sutherland. Although he was unsuccessful, when there was a further election in 1886, the Marquess chose not to stand, and Sutherland was elected as an MP. After nine years as an MP, in 1894 he resigned his post and became Chairman of the Fishery Board for Scotland. In this role he chaired the Scottish Departmental Committee on the North Sea Fishing Industry He was also a Member of Royal Commission on Highlands and Islands of Scotland, of the Congested Districts Board for Scotland and of the Royal Commission on Congestion in Ireland.

He was appointed a Companion of the Order of the Bath in 1907.

Parliament of the United Kingdom
| Preceded by Cromartie Sutherland-Leveson-Gower | Member of Parliament for Sutherland; 1886–1894 | Succeeded by John MacLeod |
