= Macpherson baronets =

Title in Baronetage of United Kingdom

There have been two baronetcies created for persons with the surname Macpherson, one in the Baronetage of Great Britain and one in the Baronetage of the United Kingdom.

The Macpherson baronetcy, of Calcutta in India, was created in the Baronetage of Great Britain on 27 June 1786 for John Macpherson. He was Acting Governor-General of India from 1785 to 1786 and also represented Cricklade and Horsham in the House of Commons.

The Macpherson baronetcy, of Drumalban, was created in the Baronetage of the United Kingdom on 26 April 1933. For more information on this creation, see the Baron Strathcarron.

== Macpherson baronets, of Calcutta (1786) ==
- Sir John Macpherson, 1st Baronet (c. 1745–1821)

== Macpherson baronets, of Drumalban (1933) ==
- see the Baron Strathcarron
