= Baron Strathcarron =

Barony in the Peerage of the United Kingdom

Ian MacPherson, 1st Baron

Baron Strathcarron, of Banchor in the County of Inverness, is a title in the Peerage of the United Kingdom. It was created on 11 January 1936 for the Liberal politician Sir Ian Macpherson, 1st Baronet. He had already been created a baronet, of Drumalban on 26 April 1933. As of 2017, the titles are held by his grandson, the third Baron, who succeeded his father in 2006.

Niall Macpherson, 1st Baron Drumalbyn, was the nephew of the first Baron Strathcarron.

== Barons Strathcarron (1936) ==
- (James) Ian Macpherson, 1st Baron Strathcarron (1880–1937)
- David William Anthony Blyth Macpherson, 2nd Baron Strathcarron (1924–2006)
- Ian David Patrick Macpherson, 3rd Baron Strathcarron (b. 1949)

The heir apparent is the present holder's son, the Hon. Rory David Alisdair Macpherson (b. 1982).
The heir apparent’s heir apparent is his son, Otto Macpherson (b. 2017)

Coat of arms of Baron Strathcarron
Crest A cat-a-mountain sejant guardant having its dexter paw raised Proper. Escutcheon Per fess Or and Azure a galley of the first masts oars and tacking Proper flagged Gules in the dexter chief point a hand couped fesswise holding a dagger palewise and in the sinister a cross crosslet fitchee of the last over all a fess chequy of the second and Argent. Supporters Dexter a private soldier of the Cameron Highlanders in full service dress of the period 1916-18 sinister a Macpherson clansman of the period of 1745. Motto Le Cridhe's Le Cliu
