= Matheson baronets of Lochalsh (1882) =

Escutcheon of the Matheson baronets of Lochalsh

The Matheson baronetcy, of Lochalsh in the County of Ross, was created in the Baronetage of the United Kingdom on 15 May 1882 for the businessman and politician Alexander Matheson. He was the nephew of the 1st Baronet of the 1850 creation and a partner in Jardine Matheson. He represented Inverness Burghs from 1847 to 1868 and Ross and Cromarty from 1868 to 1884 in the House of Commons.

The Matheson family owned Gledfield House, a 19th-century country house, near Ardgay, Sutherland. It was developed in the 1850s and extended by architects Ross & Macbeth, for the 2nd baronet, from 1895 to 1907. The 3rd Baronet was a member of the Senate of Australia. The 5th Baronet was a General in the British Army, from 1934.

The 6th Baronet succeeded a kinsman as Chief of Clan Matheson in 1975.

== Matheson baronets, of Lochalsh (1882) ==
- Sir Alexander Matheson, 1st Baronet (1805–1886)
- Sir Kenneth James Matheson, 2nd Baronet (1854–1920)
- Sir Alexander Perceval Matheson, 3rd Baronet (1861–1929)
- Sir Roderick Mackenzie Chisholm Matheson, 4th Baronet (1861–1944)
- Sir Torquhil George Matheson, 5th Baronet (1871–1963)
- Sir Torquhil Alexander Matheson, 6th Baronet (1925–1993)
- Sir Fergus John Matheson, 7th Baronet (1927–2017)
- Lieutenant-Colonel Sir Alexander Fergus Matheson of Matheson, 8th Baronet LVO DL (born 1954)

The heir apparent is the present holder's son Andrew William Fergus Matheson (born 1985).

== Notes ==
Baronetage of the United Kingdom
Preceded by Vivian baronets	Matheson baronets of Lochalsh; 15 May 1882	Succeeded by Milbank baronets
