= 1895 Inverness Burghs by-election =

UK parliamentary by-election

The 1895 Inverness Burghs by-election was a parliamentary by-election held on 31 August 1895 for the UK House of Commons constituency of Inverness Burghs, which was made up of the towns of Inverness, Fortrose, Forres and Nairn in the Scottish Highlands.

== Vacancy ==
Under the provisions of the Succession to the Crown Act 1707 and a number of subsequent Acts, MPs appointed to certain ministerial and legal offices were at this time required to seek re-election. The vacancy in Inverness Burghs was caused by the appointment of the sitting Liberal Unionist MP, Robert Finlay to become Solicitor General.

== Candidates ==
Finlay stood again in the Liberal Unionist interest. The Liberal Party had held the seat from 1892, when Gilbert Beith took it from Finlay, until the general election of 1895 when Finlay had regained it. Beith had stood down and the Liberals had a new candidate, Henry Bell. But on 26 August 1895, the local Liberal Association held a meeting to consider whether or not to oppose Finlay and it was unanimously agreed not to field a candidate.

There being no other nominations therefore, Finlay was returned unopposed.

== Result ==
Inverness Burghs by-election, 1895
Party	Candidate	Votes	%	±%
Liberal Unionist	Robert Finlay	Unopposed	N/A	N/A
Liberal Unionist hold				

== See also ==
- Lists of United Kingdom by-elections
- United Kingdom by-election records
