= Màiri Mhòr nan Òran =

Scottish Gaelic poet (1821–1898)

Mary MacPherson
- Màiri Mhòr nan Òran
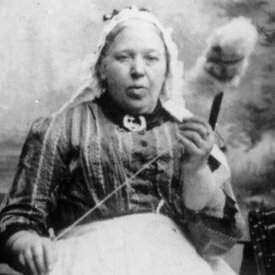
- Born: Mary MacDonald; 10 March 1821; Skeabost, Skye, Scotland
- Died: 8 November 1898 (aged 77); Portree, Skye, Scotland
- Education: Glasgow Royal Infirmary
- Occupations: Nurse and midwife, poet
- Spouse: Isaac MacPherson
- Writing career
- Language: Scottish Gaelic
- Movement: Highland Land League

Mary MacPherson (née MacDonald), known as Màiri Mhòr nan Òran (English: Great Mary of the Songs) or simply Màiri Mhòr (10 March 1821 – 7 November 1898), was a Scottish Gaelic poet from the Isle of Skye, whose contribution to Scottish Gaelic literature is focused heavily upon the Highland Clearances and the Crofters War; the Highland Land League's campaigns of rent strikes and other forms of direct action. Although she could read her own work when it was written down, she could not write it down herself. She retained her songs and poems in her memory and eventually dictated them to others, who wrote them down for publication. She often referred to herself as Màiri Nighean Iain Bhàin (Mary, daughter of fair haired John), the name by which she would have been known as a child in Skye.

== Life ==
Mary MacDonald was born at Skeabost, Isle of Skye, in 1821 to John Macdonald and Flora MacInnes. She moved to Inverness in 1844 where she married shoemaker Isaac MacPherson on 11 November 1847. She and Isaac had five children who lived to maturity. Following the death of her husband in 1871, Mairi Mhòr took employment as a domestic servant with the family of a British Army officer. She was accused of stealing clothes belonging to the officer's wife, who had just died of typhoid, and sentenced to 40 days imprisonment. All court documents relating to the case appear to have been lost and it is unclear exactly what happened. It is often claimed that another servant with a grudge against her planted the stolen clothes in Mairi Mhòr's box. She protested her innocence for the rest of her life and was almost universally believed by the Gaelic speaking community. At the time of her trial, she was supported by John Murdoch, campaigning journalist and founder of The Highlander. Charles Fraser-Mackintosh, Inverness solicitor and politician, is also said to have acted on her behalf, but it is unclear in what capacity. This marks the start of a friendship between the poet and the politician that lasted for the rest of her life. Her brush with the law and the feeling it aroused is recorded in Tha mi sgìth de luchd na Beurla (I'm tired of the English speakers). She said that the humiliation (tàmailt) she endured brought her muse to life.

On her release in 1872 Mairi Mhòr moved to Glasgow, aged about 50. Here she seems to have learned to read and write in English, and qualified with a nursing certificate and diploma in obstetrics from Glasgow Royal Infirmary. In 1876 she moved to Greenock to work but often returned to Glasgow for cèilidhs and other gatherings of Skye people. Both Glasgow and Greenock had sizeable Gaelic-speaking communities at the time. It is thought that she probably sang at many of these cèilidhs as there is evidence of her frequently doing so after she retired to Skye in 1882. By this time she had acquired a reputation for her songs and her championing of the crofters in the increasingly heated debate over land rights. She sang at the first ever National Mòd in Oban in 1892 but did not win a medal.

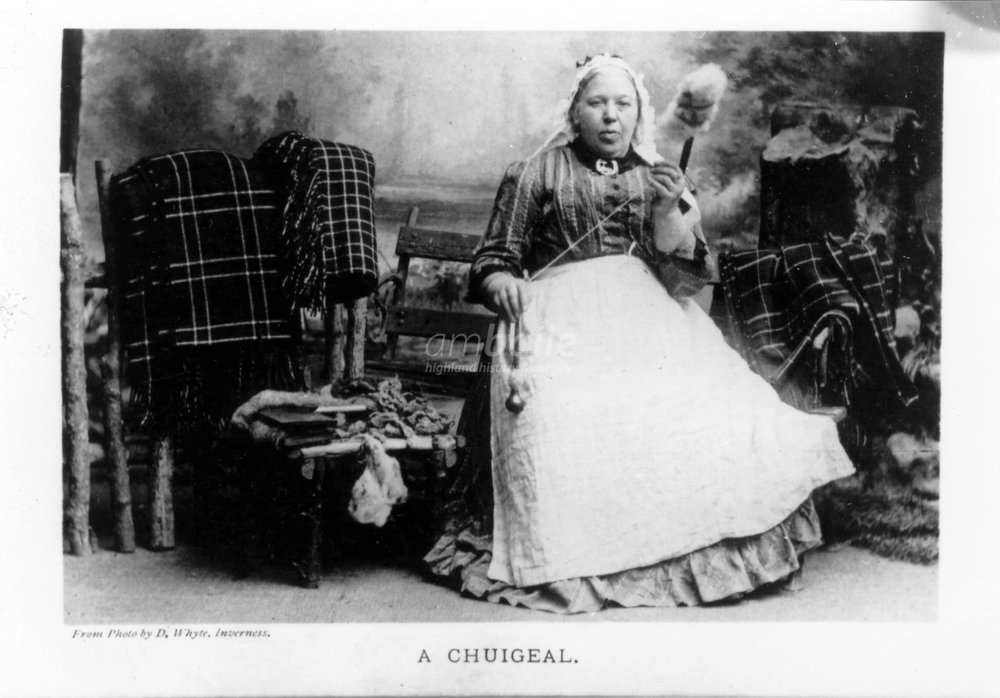
Photograph of Màiri Mhòr with her spinning whorl

On returning to Skye she lived with a friend, Mrs MacRae of Os, until Lachlann MacDonald, laird of Skeabost provided her with a rent free cottage. She then became actively involved in the Crofters' War and the Highland land issue, which provided the themes of some of her best known songs. She is known to have been present at Highland Land League meetings and to have been actively involved with campaigners such as Alexander Mackenzie and her friend Fraser-Mackintosh in the run up to the Napier Commission of 1883-4 and the Crofters Act of 1886.

In one of her songs of this period, Nuair chaidh na ceithir ùr oirre Mairi describes a crossing of the Strome Ferry with Fraser-Mackintosh, Mackenzie (Clach na Cùdainn), his son and Kenneth MacDonald to gather support for the land struggle. Clach tells her that the boat will sink if she gets on board with the rest as she weighs in at 17 stone (108 kg). Instead she is to wait behind and the boatman will return for her alone. She was 5 ft 9 inches tall (172.5cm) tall so the epithet mhòr can refer to her physique as well as to her status in Gaelic poetry. Among other well known and frequently sung songs from her Land League period are Oran Beinn Li, Coinneamh nan Croitearan and Eilean a' Cheò.

Like her contemporary Gaelic bard and activist, Mary Mackellar, Mairi Mhòr greatly admired and became friendly with Professor John Stuart Blackie. She was a skilled spinner and wool worker and made Blackie a tartan plaid. Later she devised a tartan which she called "The Blackie". Blackie gave her a beautifully crafted cromag (shepherd's crook). She also presented Fraser-Mackintosh with a woollen suit. She had done the spinning and dying but not the weaving.

Her last known address, at Beaumont Crescent, Portree, in the building now called the Rosedale Hotel, is commemorated today with a blue plaque.

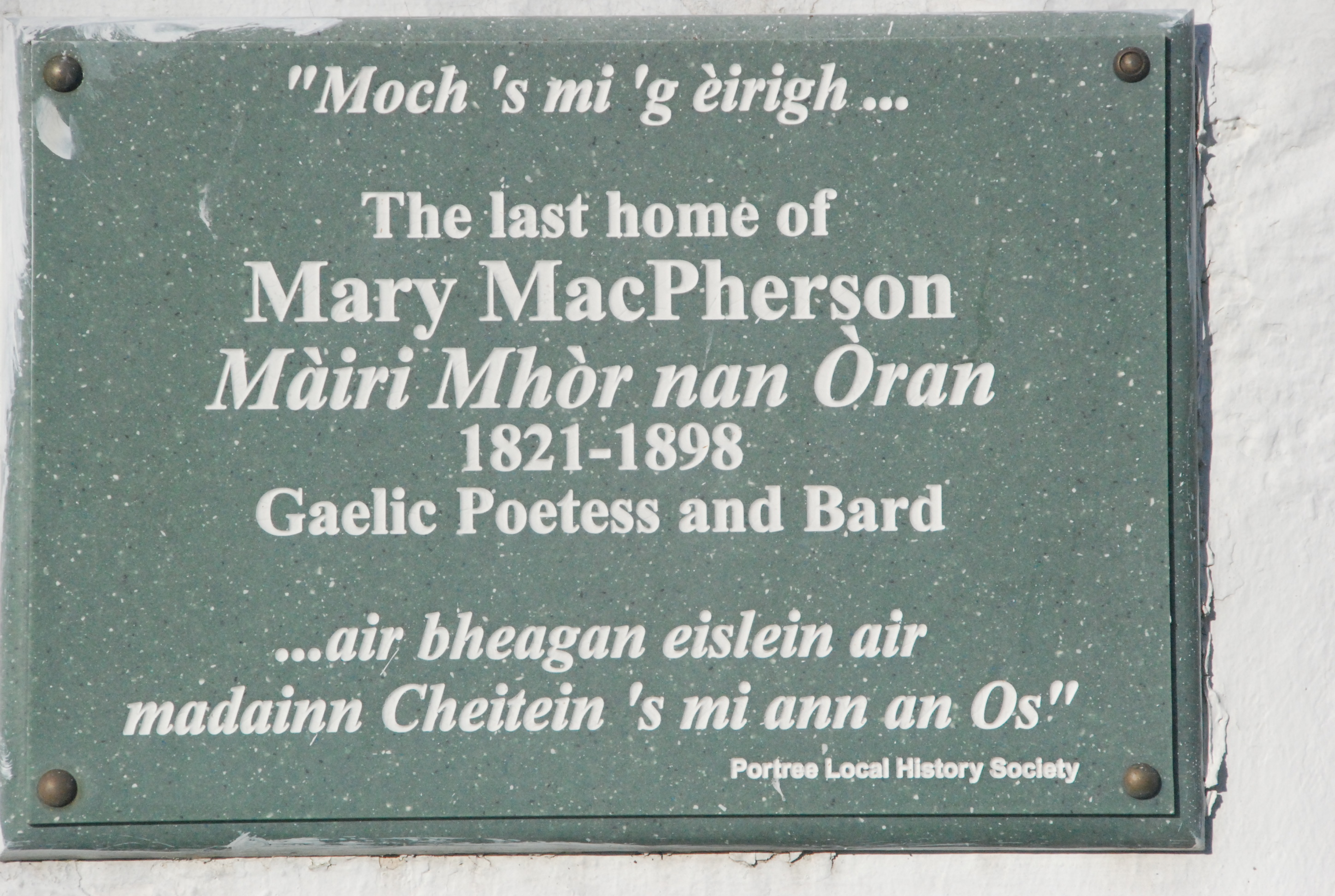
Plaque on the Rosedale Hotel, Portree to Mairi Mhor nan Oran

Màiri Mhòr died in Portree 1898 and was buried in Chapel Yard Cemetery in Inverness beside her husband. A gravestone was erected by Fraser-Mackintosh.

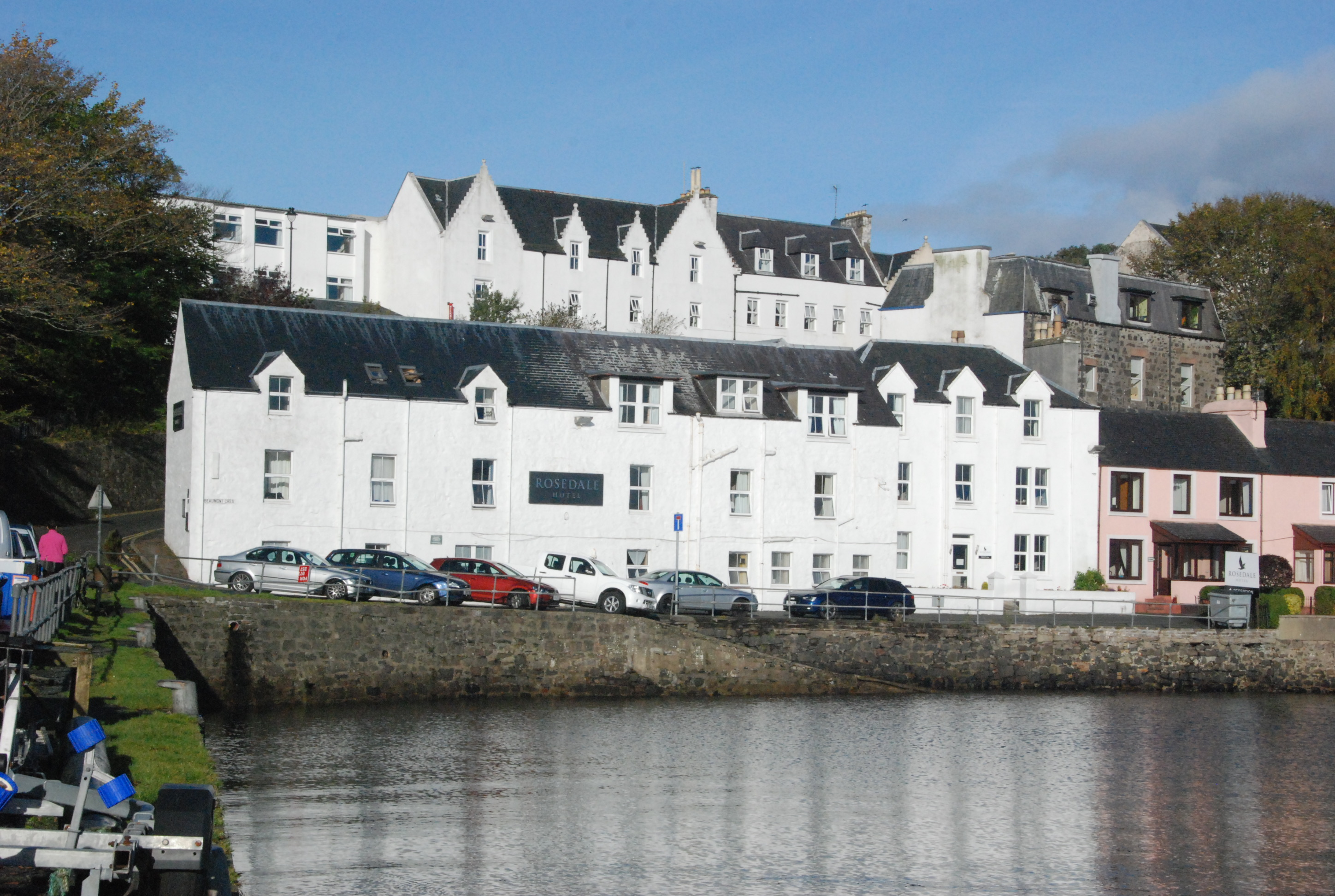
Beaumont Crescent, Portree. Last known address of Mairi Mhor nan Oran

== Significance of her work ==
During the Highland Land League, song was a key mode of spreading information to local Gaelic speaking communities in Skye, many of whom were not literate in Gaelic. Furthermore, her poetry now provides a significant body of evidence about the crofters' uprisings.

Furthermore, according to Celticist and historian of the Highland Scottish diaspora Michael Newton, "The songs of Màiri Mhòr nan Òran... were very popular in Scotland during the late nineteenth century. These songs not only made their way to Cape Breton but were also recorded in California by folksong collector Sydney Robertson Cowell in 1939 (available through the California Gold Collection prepared by the Library of Congress)."

=== Published work ===
- Gaelic Songs and Poems, by Mary MacPherson, 1891.

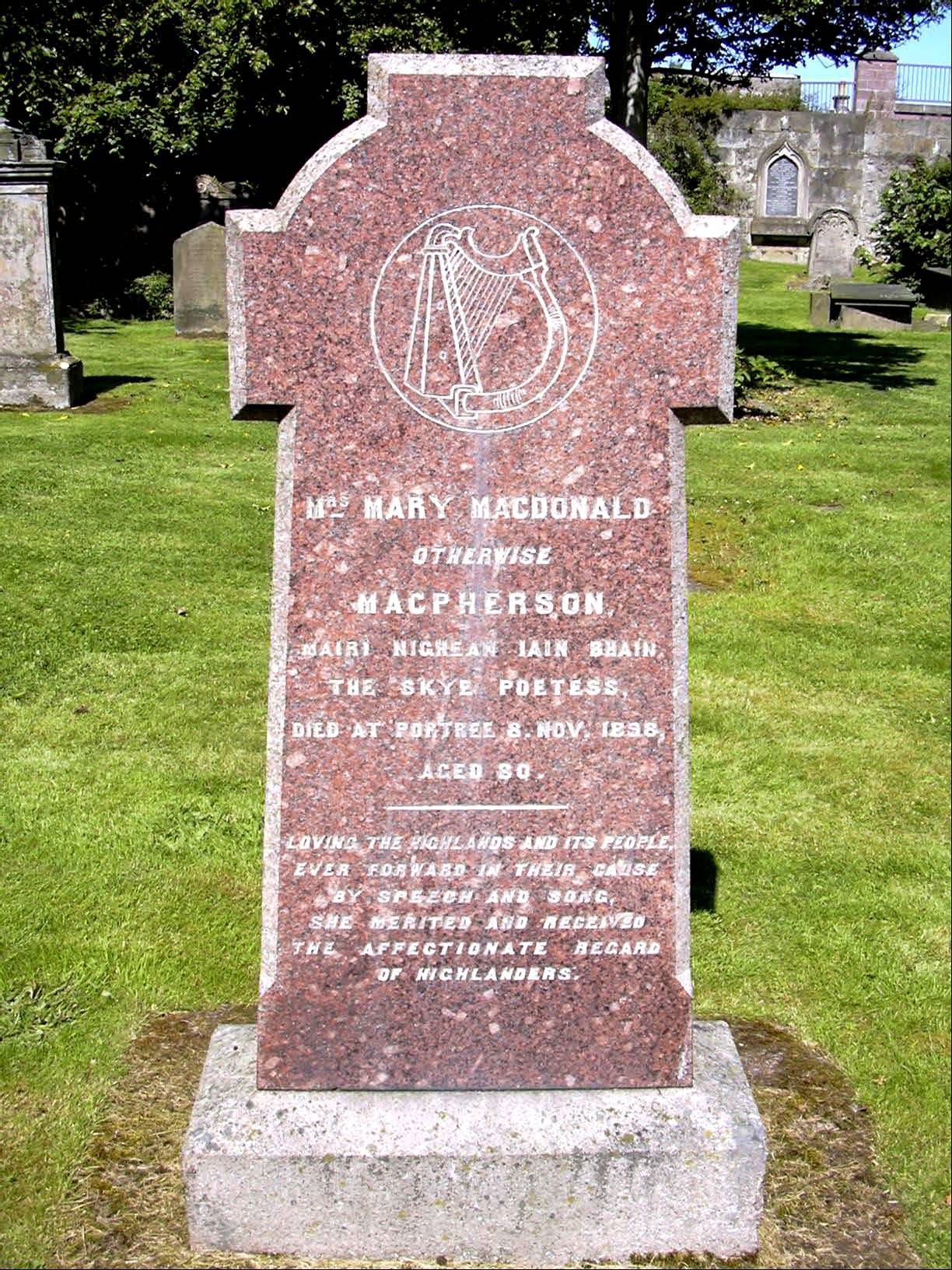
Grave Stone of Mairi Mhòr in Chapel Yard Cemetery, Inverness

== Critiques of her work ==
Mairi's loyalty to ancient Highland tradition and her people shows in Eilean a' Cheò she tells of her hopes for her native Skye;

Gum bi ur crodh air bhuailtean,
'S gach tuathanach air dòigh,
'S na Sasannaich air fuadach,
A Eilean uain' a' Cheò

Translation:

that your cattle will be penned
and every farm in order
and the English cleared
from the Green Island of the mist (Skye)

Donald Meek quotes Sheriff Alexander Nicolson in his History of the Island of Skye as saying that Màiri's songs had little permanent value after the events they commemorated has passed. Nicholson felt that "few of her productions are worthy of preservation…. her imagery was too fleeting and superficial".

Sorley Maclean, on the other hand, wrote of her work that “Its greatness consists of the fusion of social and private passion…..with extra-ordinary vitality and joie de vivre; for of all the Gaelic poets not even Alexander MacDonald (Alasdair mac Mhaighstir Alasdair) had more vitality and joie de vivre than Màiri Mhòr.... Màiri's poetry is rich in imagery and symbol although it is not very rich in metaphor ... Màiri Mhòr's poetry has always been greatly moving to the 'sophisticated' as well as a great many of the 'unsophisticated' among those who know her language".

At the same time, however, Maclean had pointed criticism of Màiri Mhòr's repeated decision in her poetry to blame the Highland Clearances upon the Isle of Skye on "the English" (Scottish Gaelic: na Sasannaich). According to Maclean, "She attacked the English for their doings in Skye, though it was very plain that not one clearance had been made in Skye by anyone who had not a name as Gaelic as her own."
