= John Murdoch (editor) =

Scottish newspaper owner and editor (1818–1903)

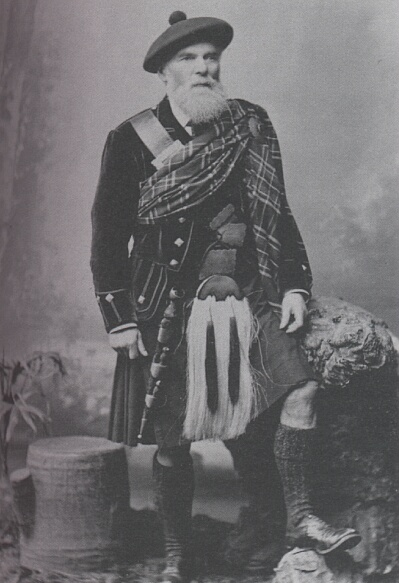
John Murdoch

John Murdoch (Scottish Gaelic: Iain MacMhuirich) (15 January 1818 – 29 January 1903) was a Scottish newspaper owner and editor and land reform campaigner who played a significant part in the campaign for crofters rights in the late 19th century.

== Early life ==
Murdoch was born in the farmhouse of Lynemore in the parish of Ardclach, Nairn. He was the second child of John Murdoch and Mary Macpherson, the daughter of a sea captain. In 1827 the family moved to the island of Islay and Murdoch lived there until 1838, when he moved to work in a grocer's shop in Paisley. Shortly afterwards he joined the Excise service, completing his training in Edinburgh. He served as an exciseman in Kilsyth, Lancashire and Ireland. He retired to Inverness and from 1873 until 1881 ran the campaigning newspaper, The Highlander.

In his youth in Islay, Murdoch associated with the family of the laird, Walter Frederick Campbell, including his son, the famous Gaelic folklorist and literary scholar, Iain Òg Ile (1822–85). The laird's refusal to evict his tenants ultimately resulted in bankruptcy during the Highland Potato Famine, the confiscation and sale of Islay by the Laird's creditors to James Morrison, and the beginning of the Highland Clearances upon the island. Murdoch's commitment to the Gaelic language revival and his hostility to the absolute power granted to Anglo-Scottish landlords by Scots property law are both believed to be rooted in his experiences while living on Islay.

== Career ==
In the 1840s Murdoch spent time in Armagh in Ulster. He would later be posted in Lancashire where he came into contact with Chartism and the views of Feargus O'Connor. The Chartists believed that a healthy rural population needed to own their own land and be free of the influence of Anglo-Irish landlords, land agents, and industrialists. In Lancashire he found himself acquainted with Michael Davitt who had been evicted from his farm in Mayo and moved to Haslingden.

In the 1850s and 1860s, Murdoch spent a number of years living in Dublin, where he encountered Irish nationalism and the radical ideology that led to the Land War. At this time he wrote articles for the Irish Nationalist newspaper The Nation under the synonym Finlagan. He was a close friend of its founder, Charles Gavan Duffy, and maintained relationships with others such as the editor A. M. Sullivan, with whom he shared common literary interests and a mutual disdain of landlordism. While working in Dublin he is said to have had an influence on Alexander Carmichael, a fellow Argyllshire Gael who, likewise, was employed as an exciseman.

As a civil servant, he found himself committed to improving the working conditions and treatment of his profession. He was well-respected by other civil servants for this, and despite achieving great improvements in treatment for civil servants he continued to push for more. Hunter speculates that he was removed to Shetland as a result of his activism.

== The Highlander ==
On retiring to Inverness, Murdoch quickly became a figure of national prominence. He championed the poet Mairi Mhòr nan Oran, when she was put on trial. He is said to have arranged for her legal representation and may have introduced her to Charles Fraser-Mackintosh. Shortly after this he started editing the weekly newspaper, The Highlander, which ran until it succumbed to endemic financial difficulties in 1881. Professor Meek writes that the songs of Mairi Mhòr show the influence that The Highlander had on both Scottish Gaelic literature and upon the opinions of ordinary Highland people, even though the articles were mainly in English.

Murdoch believed that a vicious economic system rooted in the greed of the landlords and in the abuse of Scots property law was at the root of all other ills in the Highlands and Islands. He further believed that this could only be changed by the crofters and peasants standing up for themselves in a campaign of direct action similar to the Irish Land War. In common with other campaigners for the reform of Scots property law, Murdoch invoked the Gaelic cultural principle of dùthchas, according to which all clan members had an inalienable right to live in their clan's territory and that the land belonged to the clan as a whole and had never been the mere personal property of the Chiefs. Murdoch also argued that a sustained campaign of linguistic imperialism and coercive Anglicisation had all but destroyed the morale and cultural self-confidence of the Gaels, which also needed to be reversed as part of the land reform campaign.

In The Highlander, Murdoch further declared his Pan-Celtic beliefs and aimed towards, "sinking the differences between the different members of the great Celtic family... after the ages and generations during which they have been perpetuating follies and wickednesses against each other at the bidding of their common political enemies."

Murdoch's kilted figure became familiar in crofting townships as he urged crofters and tenants to organise and stand up for themselves. Affectionately known as Murchadh na Feilidh ("Murchadh of the Kilt"), he also encouraged the crofting population to set a much higher value on their country, race, lore, and language.

== Later life ==
James Hunter credits Murdoch with bringing together urban middle class Gaels, who had lost contact with crofts and crofting but had retained a sense of their Gaelic cultural identity, and the crofting communities of the Highlands and Islands Murdoch was possibly the single most influential individual in the creation of the atmosphere and situation that resulted in the Highland Land League, The Crofters' War, hearings of The Napier Commission, and the resultant Crofters Holdings (Scotland) Act 1886, which accordingr to John Lorne Campbell, was nothing less than "the Magna Carta of the Highlands and Islands", and which, according to Roger Hutchinson, "legislated for fair rents, compensation for improvements to land and property, and above all for security of tenure to crofters in South Uist, Barra, and everywhere else in the north and west of Scotland. The days of the crofting tenant-at-will were over. There would be – there could be – no more mass Clearances from the Highlands. The men of that large region, whatever their language or religion, could after 1886 exercise their right to vote in local and national elections without the threat of serious reprisal."

Professor Meek suggests that Murdoch was also a significant influence over the Rev. Donald MacCallum, a minister of the Established Church of Scotland and one of the few Protestant clergymen to actively challenge the Anglo-Scottish landlords. MacCallum's campaigns at the time of the Crofters War sought to use the Bible to justify reforming the laws regarding land ownership, a regular theme in Murdoch's writing.

While many of the leaders of the land reform movement were associated with the Liberal Party, Murdoch was a socialist. He stood unsuccessfully for the Scottish Land Restoration League in Partick at the 1885 general election, and persuaded Keir Hardie to stand as an Independent Labour candidate and was one of the chairs at the meeting to found the Scottish Labour Party.

== Personal life ==
Murdoch married an Irishwoman, Eliza Jane Tickell, in Dublin in 1856. She was fourteen years younger than him. Together they had six children: Frances, Jessie, John, Ronald Gordon, Alexander Sullivan (Charlie), and Mary. He died on 29 January 1903 at Saltcoats in Ayrshire, where he had moved with his wife some years previously. He is buried in Ardrossan cemetery with Eliza who died in June 1905.
