= Charles Cumming-Bruce =

British politician

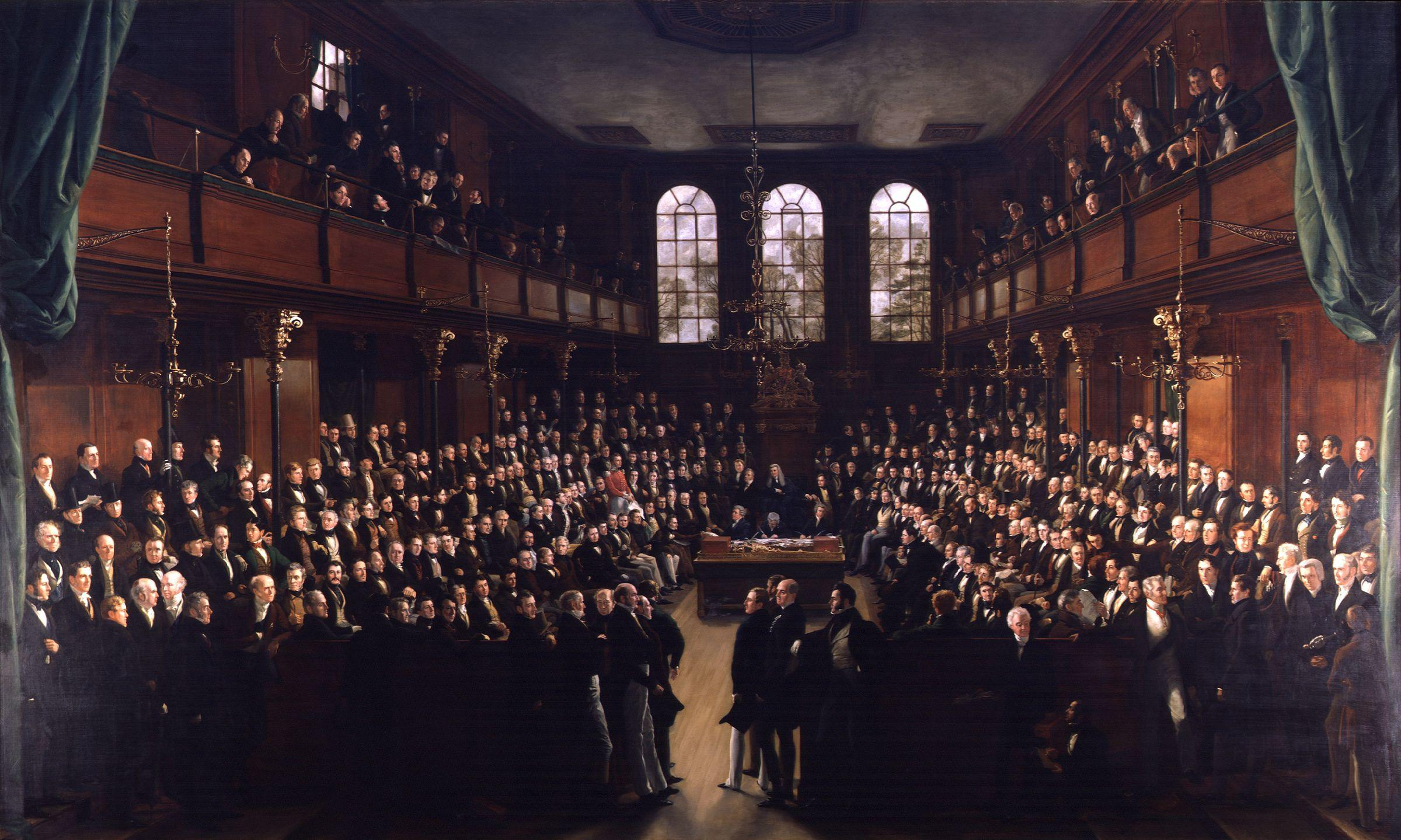
The House of Commons, 1833 by Sir George Hayter

Charles Lennox Cumming-Bruce (20 February 1790 – 1 January 1875), was a Scottish Conservative politician. He was the second son of Sir Alexander Cumming-Gordon, 1st Baronet, and in 1820 married Mary Elizabeth Bruce, the only daughter of James Bruce.

He served as the Member of Parliament for the Inverness Burghs constituency from 1831 to 1837 - being re-elected in 1834 with a majority of only four votes, and for Elginshire and Nairnshire from 1840 to 1868.

Cumming-Bruce's only child Elizabeth Mary Cumming-Bruce married James Bruce, 8th Earl of Elgin.

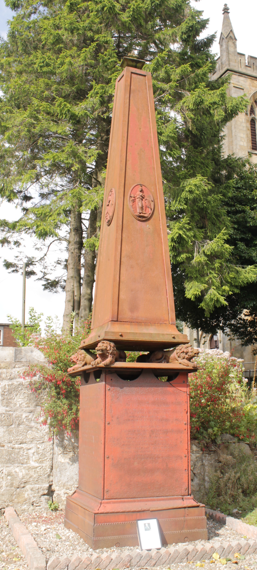
The grave of James Bruce of Kinnaird, Larbert Churchyard

He is commemorated on the monument to James Bruce of Kinnaird on the east face of the iron monument.

Parliament of the United Kingdom
Preceded by John Baillie	Member of Parliament for Inverness Burghs; 1831–1832	Succeeded by John Baillie
Preceded by John Baillie	Member of Parliament for Inverness Burghs; 1833–1837	Succeeded by Roderick Macleod
Preceded by Francis Ogilvy-Grant	Member of Parliament for Elginshire and Nairnshire; 1840–1868	Succeeded by James Ogilvy-Grant
