= Sir Alexander Matheson, 1st Baronet =

British China merchant, Member of Parliament and railway entrepreneur

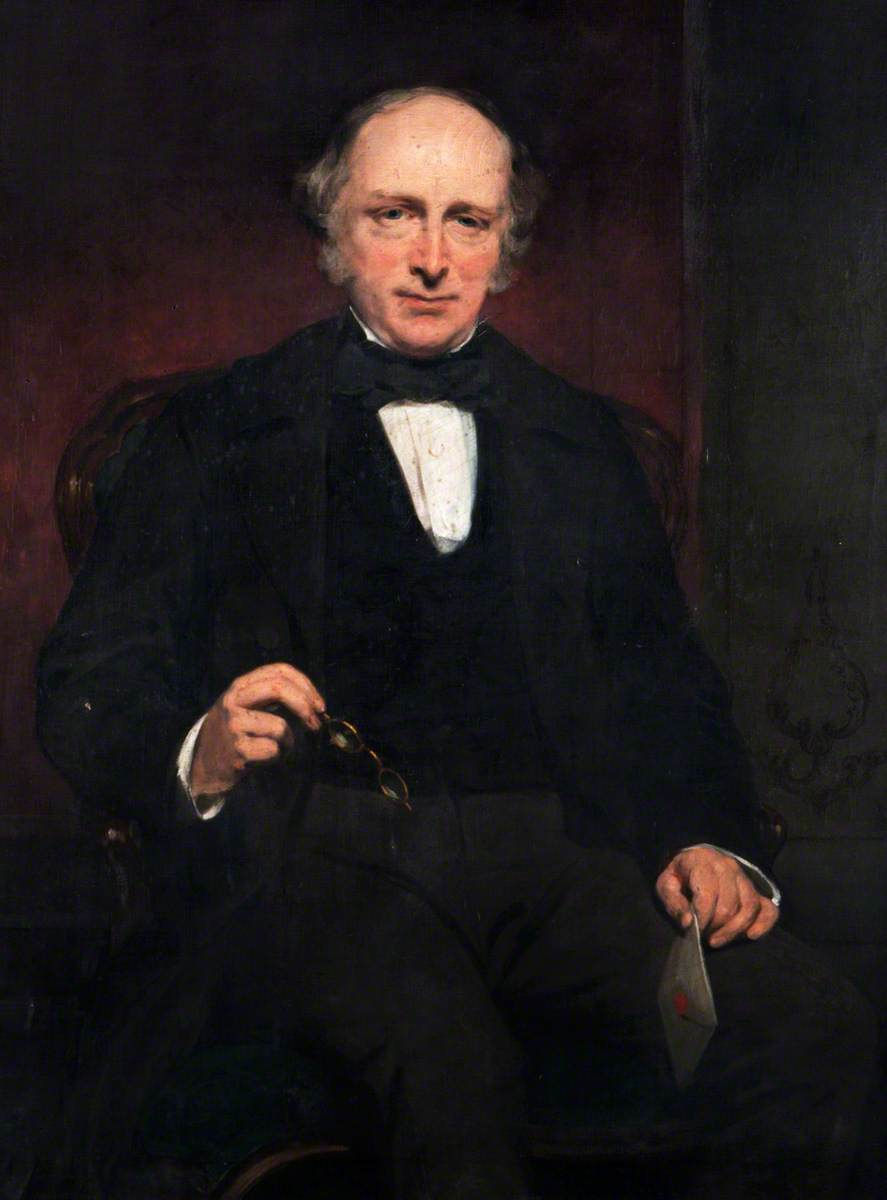
Sir Alexander Matheson

Sir Alexander Matheson, 1st Baronet, JP, DL (16 January 1805 – 26 July 1886) was a British China merchant, Liberal Member of Parliament, and railway entrepreneur.

== Life and career ==
The son of John Matheson Esq of Ardross and Attadale, Ross-shire, the family's ancestral seat, Alexander left home at an early age to trade in the Far East. Matheson was a nephew of Sir James Matheson of Lewis, the famous Jardine & Matheson Co, making his fortune from trading opium in the Far East, notably in the Canton and Hong Kong. Matheson was the nephew of Sir James Matheson, 1st Baronet, and made a partner in the family firm of Jardine Matheson, and a matrilinear nephew of Lt-Col. Thomas Matheson. Educated at Edinburgh University, he knew enough economics to become a Director of the Bank of England. He also served as a magistrate, and was appointed Deputy Lieutenant of the counties of Ross and Cromarty and Inverness-shire.

Having retired from trade in 1839 he made a land deal purchasing the Ardintoul estate, with more land acquired at Inverinate on Loch Duich in 1844. To his own disappointment he was not a successful farmer on the sparsely populated lochside, but proved a developer and builder. Matheson was elected as MP for Inverness Burghs in 1847, on repeal of the corn laws. From 1849 his London home was at no.16 South Audley Street, near Park Lane and joined the Reform Club on The Mall. He succeeded his uncle, as Liberal MP for Ross and Cromarty from 1868.

In 1851 he added to his local status as an MP by purchasing the feudal barony of Lochalsh, which had remained dormant since 1427. The estate comprised lands on the left bank of Loch Ness purchased in the 1850s: and the ruins of Eilean Donan Castle, later sold by the second baronet. He built Ardross House and Ardross Street on the west side of Inverness. To the north of the town he built Perceval Street. Historian A Clark speculated that the "poppies adorning" the gatehouse at Ardross were proof of involvement in the opium trade. He was responsible for building in the small village, and developing the Skye railhead at the Kyle from Dingwall. In the 1860s Sir Alexander built another home at Duncraig Castle.

By 1862, Matheson was Chairman of the Northern Railway, making it the largest in the Highlands. He joined up with Joseph Mitchell to extend the line to Dingwall, the directors dispensing with his services by 1867. The line finally opened on 1 August 1870. During the following decades Matheson evicted tenants from his more fertile Easter Ross estates. Riots broke out at Plockton, on one occasion resulting in ten arrests. Matheson posted extra guards on the Highland Railway sacking all his employees involved in the protests. By 1893, largely through Sir Alexander's influence the Kyle had replaced Plockton as the district's administrative centre.

He supported William Ewart Gladstone's remarkable Midlothian campaign, but remained critical of Munro-Ferguson's utterances on Home Rule for Scotland.

As Chairman of the Dingwall and Skye railway he effected a merger with the Highland railway on 2 August 1880. The result was that his concern held sway over the network across the highlands from Inverness to the sea at Skye. On 15 May 1882 he was created a Baronet, of Lochalsh in the County of Ross. When the Napier Commission arrived in 1883-4 for an extensive tour of the affected areas in the Highlands, they were met by Matheson at the Kyle of Lochalsh. The Crofters Holdings Act 1886 enfranchised the tenantry for the first time entitling them to be included in the settlement south of the border; an unprecedented Crofters Party was formed to stand for Parliament.

== Family ==
Matheson married three times. His first marriage was to Mary, only daughter of J. C. Macleod Esq., of Geanses in 1840, but she died soon afterwards.

His second marriage in 1853 was to the Hon. Lavinia Mary, daughter of Thomas Stapleton, by Mary Gerard, and sister of 8th Lord Beaumont; they had a son and daughter:

- Sir Kenneth James, 2nd Baronet of Lochalsh (1854–1920)
- Mary Isabella (1855–1933)

Lavinia drowned soon after Mary's birth.

Thirdly he married Eleanor Irving, daughter of Spencer Perceval Esq., of Portman Square, London and Anna Eliza Macleod on 17 April 1860. They had eight children:

- Flora Matheson ( -1927)
- Hylda Nora Grace Matheson (1870–1902)
- Anna Elizabeth (1864–1927)
- Sir Alexander Perceval Matheson of Lochalsh, 3rd baronet (1861–1929)
- Sir Roderick Mackenzie Chisholm Matheson of Lochalsh, 4th baronet (1861–1944)
- George Charles Matheson (1867–1870)
- Eleanor Margaret Matheson (1868–1896)
- Gen. Sir Torquil George Matheson of Lochalsh, 5th baronet (1871–1963).

== Legacy ==
History has adjudged Sir Alexander and his uncle, Sir James Matheson, as benevolent landlords but when the estate was sold in 1919 by Sir Kenneth, 2nd Baronet, he was the last of the ancient clan bloodline of duthchas to own the wilderness of Wester Ross the Balmacara estate. Sir Alexander was an energetic and dynamic entrepreneur who drove forward the industrial revolution. Despite this the population remained small and, isolated without growth, had shrunk by 1901.

Matheson died on 27 July 1886, aged 81.

== Notes ==
Parliament of the United Kingdom
Preceded by James Morrison	Member of Parliament for Inverness Burghs; 1847–1868	Succeeded by Aeneas William Mackintosh
Preceded by Sir James Matheson	Member of Parliament for Ross and Cromarty; 1868–1884	Succeeded by Ronald Munro-Ferguson
Baronetage of the United Kingdom
New creation	Baronet (of Lochalsh); 1882–1886	Succeeded by Kenneth James Matheson
