= Penguins of Madagascar (soundtrack) =

2014 film score by Lorne Balfe

Penguins of Madagascar: Music from the Motion Picture

Film score by Lorne Balfe
- Released: November 21, 2014
- Recorded: 2014
- Genre: Film score
- Length: 52:46
- Label: Relativity Music Group
- Producer: Hans Zimmer

Lorne Balfe chronology
Gloria (2014)	Penguins of Madagascar: Music from the Motion Picture (2014)	Home (2015)

Penguins of Madagascar: Music from the Motion Picture is the score album for the 2014 film Penguins of Madagascar. The fourth installment and spin-off of the Madagascar film series, features original score composed by Lorne Balfe, in his first solo debut in a DreamWorks Animation film. He previously wrote additional music for the previous two Madagascar films and also co-composed the score of Megamind (2010) with Hans Zimmer. Zimmer and his music company Remote Control Productions produced the original soundtrack.

The soundtrack album was released digitally on November 21, 2014 and through CDs on December 5, by Relativity Music Group. It featured a special edition bonus track, that consisted the musical score as well as tracks from the extended play, Penguins of Madagascar: Black & White Christmas Album, which featured five holiday songs. Pitbull performed a non-album single titled "Celebrate" for the film, which was played during the credits, and released as a part of his eighth studio album Globalization. A music video of the song was also released on YouTube on October 21, 2014, and the full song released the following day.

== Reception ==
The score received mixed reviews from critics. James Southall of Movie Wave wrote "anyone who likes this sort of thing will certainly like this because it's done very well – it's accomplished music, it's a great example of how to do essentially monothematic scoring for this type of film in an interesting way (indeed, the score's weakest moments tend to be when Balfe leaves the theme behind and goes a bit more mickey-mousey) and it certainly has entertainment value." Entertainment Junkie critic wrote "Penguins of Madagascar is a rewarding and highly enjoyable induction into the Lorne Balfe canon; a canon populated with more accomplished releases than many would care to admit. The repetition of the central thematic concept all throughout the running time will undeniably irritate many of the listeners, but the composer's meticulous attempts to provide variation prove effective."

Writing for The Highlander, Edward Dave wrote "The soundtrack was actually pretty impressive for the simple fact that it made the larger-than-life events in the movie have gravity and weight. It encompasses city music with lots of instrumentation to emphasize the hustle and bustle of the land and tropical sounds which were simpler to set the tone of the island regions. Every musical choice transitioned seamlessly and there were never any parts where the music seemed too overbearing to incorporate comedy or exposition, which many cartoon movies happen to do."

Penguins of Madagascar's score by Lorne Balfe was shortlisted as one of the 114 contenders in the Academy Award for Best Original Score category.

== Track listing ==
No.	Title	Length
1.	"The Penguins of Madagascar"	4:10
2.	"Antarctica"	3:31
3.	"Demersus"	2:53
4.	"Sclateri"	3:25
5.	"Adeliae"	3:31
6.	"Forsteri"	2:52
7.	"Patagonicus"	3:03
8.	"Magellanicus"	1:24
9.	"Private's Theme"	2:34
10.	"Robustus"	3:36
11.	"Eudyptula Minor"	1:35
12.	"Chrysolophus"	2:51
13.	"Chrysocome"	1:59
14.	"Antipodes"	1:20
15.	"Schlegeli"	2:46
16.	"Mendiculus"	3:14
17.	"Papua"	1:56
18.	"Humboldti"	2:52
19.	"He Is Dave" (featuring Antony Genn)	3:14
Total length:		52:46

== Chart performance ==
Chart (2014)	Peak position
UK Soundtrack Albums (OCC)	41
US Soundtrack Albums (Billboard)	19

== Personnel ==
Credits adapted from CD liner notes.

- Composer and producer – Lorne Balfe
- Recording – Geoff Foster, Chris Barrett
- Additional recording – Olga Fitzroy, Seth Waldmann
- Programming – Max Aruj
- Mixing – Dennis Sands
- Mastering – Stephen Marsh
- Editing – Slamm Andrews
- Music co-ordinator – Ian Broucek, Meredith McBee
- Music supervisor – Charlene Ann Huang
- Music librarian – Jill Streater
- Score assistance – John Barrett, Laurence Anslow, Stefano Civetta
- Executive producer – Bob Bowen, Jason Markey, Ryan Kavanaugh
- Design – Jordan Butcher

Orchestra

- Orchestration – Òscar Senén
- Additional orchestration– Joan Martorell
- Orchestra contractor – Lucy Whalley
- Assistant orchestra contractor – Isobel Griffiths
- Orchestra conductor – Gavin Greenaway

Choir

- Choir – Bratislava Symphony Choir
- Choir conductor – David Hernando Rico

Instrumentation

- Basses – Allen Walley, Ben Rossell, Lynda Houghton, Mary Scully, Roger Linley, Steve Mair, Steve Rossell
- Bassoon – Gavin McNaughton
- Cellos – Adrian Bradbury, Caroline Dearnley, Dave Daniels, Dave Lale, Frank Schaefer, Jonathan Williams, Josephine Knight, Martin Loveday, Nick Cooper, Paul Kegg, Sophie Harris, Anthony Lewis, Vicki Matthews, Will Schofield
- Clarinets – Nick Rodwell
- Drums – Ian Thomas
- Flutes – Eliza Marshall, Anna Noakes
- French horns – Laurence Davies, Martin Owen, Nicholas Korth, Nigel Black, Philip Eastop, Richard Berry, Richard Watkins
- Oboe, cor anglais – Rosie Jenkins
- Piano – Dave Arch
- Pipe, whistle – Troy Donockley
- Saxophones:
  - Altos – Jamie Talbot, Phil Todd
  - Tenors – Jamie Talbot, Ben Castle
  - Baritone – Dave Bishop
  - Soprano – Phil Todd
  - Bass – Mick Foster
- Trombones – Andy Wood, Byron Fulcher, Darren Smith, Dave Stewart, Keith McNicoll, Liam Kirkman, Mark Nightingale, Patrick Jackman, Pete North, Richard Edwards
- Trumpets – Alistair Mackie, Andy Crowley, John Barclay, Mike Lovatt, Simon Gardner, Tom Rees-Roberts
- Tubas – Owen Slade
- Violas – Andy Parker, Bob Smissen, Bruce White, Fiona Bonds, Helen Kamminga, Paul Cassidy, Peter Lale, Steve Wright
- Violins – Boguslaw Kostecki, Cathy Thompson, Chris Tombling, Christina Emanuel, Emil Chakalov, Emlyn Singleton, Everton Nelson, Ian Humphries, Jim McLeod, John Bradbury, Katherine Mayes, Lorraine McAslan, Maciej Rakowski, Mark Berrow, Martin Burgess, Matthew Scrivener, Patrick Kiernan, Perry Montague-Mason, Peter Hanson, Philippa Ibbotson, Rita Manning, Simon Baggs, Steve Morris, Sue Briscoe, Tom Pigott-Smith, Warren Zielinski

== Penguins of Madagascar: Black & White Christmas Album ==
Penguins of Madagascar: Black & White Christmas Album

EP by Penguins of Madagascar
- Released: November 24, 2014
- Recorded: 2014
- Genres: Pop; jazz; Christmas music
- Length: 18:36
- Label: Relativity Music Group

Penguins of Madagascar: Black & White Christmas Album is the extended play consisting of six holiday songs, performed by the cast members, released by Relativity Music Group on November 24, 2014. The album was also included into the two-disc "special edition" bonus album released on December 5.

=== Track listing ===
No.	Title	Length
1.	"Real Chill Christmas"	3:04
2.	"Jingle Bells" (Power Mix)	2:41
3.	"Stuck In The Chimney"	2:26
4.	"12 Days Of Missions"	3:58
5.	"Flying Home For Christmas"	3:49
6.	"Silver Smelt"	2:41
Total length:		18:39

== Release history ==
Region	Date	Edition	Format(s)	Label	Ref.
Various	November 21, 2014	Standard	CD; digital download; streaming	Relativity	
Various	December 5, 2014	Special edition	CD	Relativity	
Various	February 20, 2015	Special edition	Vinyl	Relativity	
