= Home (score) =

2015 film score album

Home (Original Motion Picture Score)

Film score by Lorne Balfe and Stargate
- Released: April 14, 2015
- Recorded: 2014–2015
- Studios: AIR Studios, London
- Genre: Film score
- Length: 39:44
- Label: Relativity Music Group
- Producers: Lorne Balfe; Stargate

Lorne Balfe chronology
Penguins of Madagascar (2014)	Home (2015)	Bone in the Throat (2015)

Stargate chronology
Home (soundtrack) (2015)	Home (score) (2015)	Revival (2015)

Home (Original Motion Picture Score) is the film score to the 2015 DreamWorks Animation film Home directed by Tim Johnson. The original score is composed by Lorne Balfe and the Norwegian music producers duo Stargate and recorded at the AIR Studios in London. The album was released under the Relativity Music Group on April 14, 2015.

== Background ==
In November 2014, it was announced that Lorne Balfe would compose the score for Home, after previously working with DreamWorks on Penguins of Madagascar and also in the short film Almost Home. He began recording the score at the AIR Studios in London. As he recently experienced fatherhood during that time, the composer had created the music by recording his son's heartbeat and using it into the film score, providing an emotional experience. The Norwegian music production duo Stargate which worked on the eponymous concept album had also helped in the production and recording of the film score. Much of Balfe's score had been excluded from the final film, which resulted in only 13 tracks of the score included with a runtime of nearly 40 minutes.

== Reception ==
James Southall of Movie Wave wrote "You'll know not to expect too much of Home and it does its job just fine, a cheap and cheerful piece of pure entertainment that maintains attention throughout and (unlike most similar efforts) sticks in the head, albeit only because of its main theme's similarity to something else. There are far, far worse ways of spending 40 minutes." Filmtracks wrote "Overall, few could have expected such an intelligent and entertaining score to result from Balfe for Home. It's among the more brilliantly conceived and executed children's scores of its generation, utilizing the songs and its own themes with extraordinary appeal. The recording sounds fantastic as well, begging for a lossless appreciation that is truly required in this case given the scope and ambience of the work."

TFG1Mike of Geek Cast Radio wrote "Home is a wonderful animated film for 2015, and Lorne Balfe along with Stargate compose the music so well. This score is by far one of my favorites of the year." Peter Debruge of Variety called the score "inspirational". Virginia Kublawi of Geeks + Gamers wrote "The film's original music by Lorne Balfe and Stargate is a mixed bag. There are some decent score pieces here, though the occasional humming of the five-note sequence from Close Encounters of the Third Kind was distracting. I don't understand why this reference was made."

== Track listing ==
No.	Title	Length
1.	"Symphony in Oh"	3:29
2.	"Gratuity's Apartment"	1:58
3.	"Saying the Sorry"	2:45
4.	"Two Fugitives"	3:04
5.	"Come Into the Out Now"	2:47
6.	"Smek Down"	4:18
7.	"Patched-In"	4:08
8.	"Moving Day"	2:47
9.	"Sad-Mad"	2:22
10.	"Running Towards Danger"	2:16
11.	"Knock-Knock"	2:39
12.	"Returning the Shusher"	3:41
13.	"Frolicking in Paris"	3:30
Total length:		39:44

== Unreleased tracks ==
The following are the unreleased tracks from Home:

No.	Title	Length
1.	"Face to Face"
2.	"Bathroom Humor"
3.	"Ripoff"
4.	"Fear Storming"
5.	"Cannonball Score"
6.	"Stealing the Superchip"
7.	"Warming of House Party"
