= Fortrose (Parliament of Scotland constituency) =

Constituency of the Old Parliament of Scotland

Fortrose (with Rosemarkie) in Ross-shire was a burgh constituency that elected one commissioner to the Parliament of Scotland and to the Convention of Estates.

After the Acts of Union 1707, Fortrose, Forres, Nairn and Inverness formed the Inverness district of burghs, returning one member between them to the House of Commons of Great Britain.

== List of burgh commissioners ==
- 1661–63: Alexander Grahame of Drynie
- 1665 convention: Hugh Dallas
- 1667 convention: John Gellie
- 1669–74: Alexander Forrester
- 1678 convention: Hugh Bailie
- 1681–82, 1685–86, 1689 convention, 1689: Robert Innes, bailie (fined for non-attendance, 1689)
- 1692–1701: Donald (or Daniel) Simpson the younger
- 1702–03: John Mackenzie of Assint, provost (died c.1703)
- 1703–07: Roderick McKenzie of Prestonhall

== See also ==
- List of constituencies in the Parliament of Scotland at the time of the Union
