= William Finlay, 2nd Viscount Finlay =

British judge and peer

The Right Honourable The Viscount Finlay GBE PC
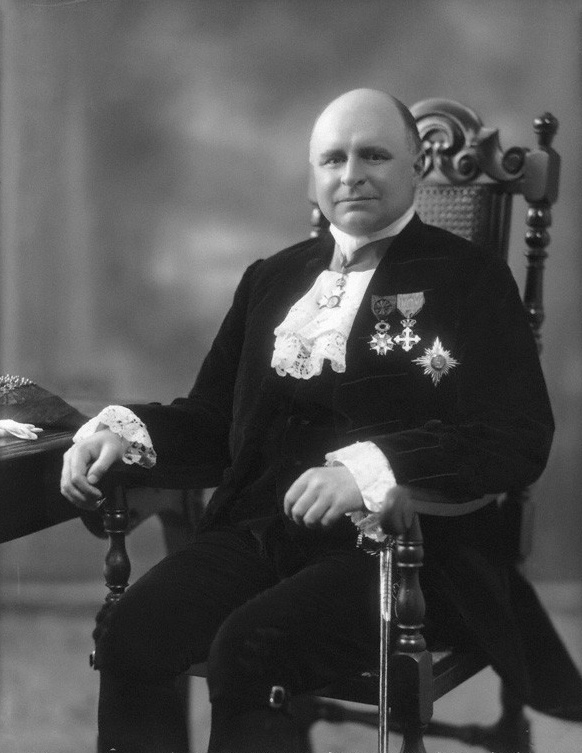
- Mr Justice Finlay in 1925

Lord Justice of Appeal
- In office 10 October 1938 – 30 June 1945
- Preceded by: None

Justice of the High Court
- In office 15 December 1924 – 10 October 1938
- Preceded by: None

Personal details
- Born: William Finlay; 15 October 1875 London, England
- Died: 30 June 1945 (aged 69) Redhill, Surrey, England
- Spouse: Beatrice Marion Hall (m. 1903; died 1942)
- Children: 1
- Education: Eton College; Trinity College, Cambridge
- Awards: Legion of Honour – (1920)

William Finlay, 2nd Viscount Finlay, GBE PC (15 October 1875 – 30 June 1945) was a British judge and peer who served as a Lord Justice of Appeal from 1938 to 1945.

The son of Lord Chancellor Finlay, William Finlay was educated at Eton and Trinity College, Cambridge, before being called to the English bar in 1901. He became a King's Counsel in 1914, a High Court judge in 1924, and a Lord Justice of Appeal in 1938. Finlay's rapid rise to professional prominence was accompanied by accusations of nepotism, though his competence was not questioned. In 1929, he inherited his father's peerages, becoming the second and last Viscount Finlay.

In addition to his legal work, Finlay also played an important role in economic warfare against Germany during both World Wars, and was responsible for two influential, if much criticised, reports on the English legal aid system. After the Second World War, Finlay was involved in the prosecution of German war crimes, serving as the British representative to the United Nations War Crimes Commission, and fought against British official indifference and obstruction. The work took a heavy toll on his health, leading to his premature death in 1945.

== Early life and career ==
Finlay was born on 15 October 1875 in London, the son of the Scottish barrister Robert Finlay and of Mary Finlay, née Innes, daughter of Cosmo Innes. Robert Finlay, later the first Viscount Finlay, later served as Lord Chancellor between 1916 and 1919 in Lloyd George's government. William Finlay was educated at Eton and Trinity College, Cambridge, where he placed third division of the third class in Part I of the classical tripos in 1897. He was president of the Cambridge Union in Easter term 1898.

Finlay was called to the bar by the Middle Temple in 1901 and joined the Northern Circuit. In 1905, he was appointed junior counsel to the Board of Inland Revenue by his father, in one of his last official acts as Attorney-General. The choice caused some controversy, given his father's position and his very short standing at the bar. In contrast, his predecessor, Sidney Rowlatt, had fourteen years' seniority at the bar when he was appointed. Criticising the appointment, the Law Times wrote:

Of this gentleman's ability and qualifications for this important and not unrenumerative post we confess our entire ignorance—a lack of knowledge that is shared by the Profession generally. But we do contend that to appoint a barrister of four years and six months' standing to a position of this description can only be described as a job.

However, there was no criticism of the way in which he carried out the duties of the post, which he occupied until 1914. He was appointed a King's Counsel the same year.

During World War I, Finlay served as chairman of the Contraband Committee in 1916, vice-chairman of the Allied Blockade Committee from 1917 to 1919, and was a temporary adviser to the Foreign Office for the Paris Peace Conference. For his wartime service, Finlay was appointed a Knight Commander of the Order of the British Empire (KBE) in 1920. He was also appointed to the Légion d'honneur and was made an Officer of the Order of Saints Maurice and Lazarus.

After the war, Finlay returned to the bar, often appearing in front of the Judicial Committee of the Privy Council. On at least one occasion he appeared in the House of Lords before his father, who was sitting as a judge. He served as Commissioner of Assize for the Northern Circuit in 1921 and for the Midland and Oxford Circuits in 1922. Finlay also served as the British representative on the International Blockade Commission in 1920–21. He was elected a bencher of the Middle Temple in November 1924.

== High Court judge ==
In 1924, Parliament passed resolutions under the Supreme Court of Judicature Act 1910 to authorise the appointment of two additional High Court judges to deal with the arrears of cases in the King's Bench Division. Finlay was duly appointed to one of the new positions in December 1924. The appointment again caused some controversy, as his father was still judicially active. The Law Times remarked that:

Sir William Finlay ... must be accounted as a singularly fortunate man ... after but twenty-three years at the Bar, for no apparent Professional reason, he is passed over the heads of those who have undoubted prior claims for consideration and whose appointment would have strengthened the King's Bench.

However, there was subsequently little complaint about the way in which he carried out his judicial duties. On the bench, Finlay tried the revenue list, which he inherited from Mr Justice Rowlatt, and presided over a number of notable criminal trials. In 1925, he tried Norman Thorne for murder. His summing-up speech, which singled out the forensic evidence of Sir Bernard Spilsbury for the prosecution over those of several defence witnesses, proved to be controversial. In 1932, he tried 31 Dartmoor prison rioters over sixteen days, taking three hours to pronounce sentence. In 1935, he tried Reginald Woolmington (of Woolmington v DPP fame) for murder; the jury was unable to come to a verdict, and Woolmington was tried again before Mr Justice Rigby Swift. In 1938, he tried the 17-year-old Owen Meakin for the murder of his father. Norman Birkett KC convinced the jury to return a verdict of manslaughters by referring to the father's behaviour towards his family, and Finlay sentenced Meakin to a short term of twelve months' imprisonment.

In 1925, Finlay was appointed to chair the Committee on Legal Aid for the Poor, charged with examining English legal aid arrangements. The committee's two reports, on criminal legal aid (1926) and civil legal aid outside of the High Court (1928) concluded that no major reform of the English legal aid system was necessary, a conclusion much criticised later. Memorably, rejecting a submission that a system of "legal hospitals" should be established, the second report stated that "It is manifestly in the interests of the State that its citizens should be healthy, not that they should be litigious."

Upon the death of his father in 1929 Finlay succeeded as the second Viscount Finlay. In 1937, he became ex officio Railway and Canal Commissioner for England and chairman of Wiltshire Quarter sessions.

== Court of Appeal and Second World War ==
The Supreme Court of Judicature (Amendment) Act 1938 authorised the appointment of three additional Lords Justices of Appeal to create a permanent third division of the Court of Appeal. In October 1938, Finlay was appointed as one of the three new Lords Justices and was sworn of the Privy Council the following month. During the Second World War, he was seconded from the Court of Appeal to chair the Contraband Committee of the Ministry of Economic Warfare, an appointment which reflected his work during the First World War. In 1943, Lord Selborne, the Minister of Economic Warfare, commissioner Finlay to produce a report on the future of the ministry; Finlay recommend that it should be disbanded after the end of the war in Europe, but that provision should be made elsewhere within the government for economic warfare planning and economic intelligence.

Finlay was promoted to be a Knight Grand Cross of the Order of the British Empire (GBE) in the 1945 New Year honours list. The same year, he was chosen as the British representative to the United Nations War Crimes Commission, in succession to Sir Cecil Hurst, whose health had broken down and who was frustrated at the British government's failure to respond to the commission's proposals for the prosecution of war criminals. The relationship between the Commission and the British government was at a low point: there was a general feeling that the British were uninterested in the commission's work, and the Norwegian government had withdrawn from the Commission out of frustration. Finlay was proposed as a candidate by Sir William Malkin, the Foreign Office Legal Adviser, who wanted to appoint a prominent figure to show that the British government attached importance to the commission's work.

Finlay was also appointed chairman of a British war crimes inter-departmental committee. It was pointed out in Whitehall that Finlay "would be personally responsible for making the British machine work and could not therefore possibly accuse the Foreign Office or HMG generally for unnecessary delays, following the example of Sir Cecil Hurst." Finlay was met with obstruction from certain parts of the government. For instance, a proposal to have German prisoners of war interrogated at the London Cage on war crimes was vetoed by Patrick Dean at the Foreign Office on the grounds that to ask them anything more than their name, rank, and number would breach the Geneva Conventions. Finlay also complained that the British Army was so disorganised that it had allowed important evidence of war crimes to be lost.

Finlay's health was affected by a trip to Buchenwald concentration camp with the UN War Crimes Commission in April 1945. He continued to work after his return, but "admitted to friends that he never really felt well again". He died on 30 June 1945, in a nursing home in Redhill, Surrey, whereupon his peerages became extinct. He had been widely expected to be the British choice for appointment to the new International Court of Justice.

== Character and assessment ==
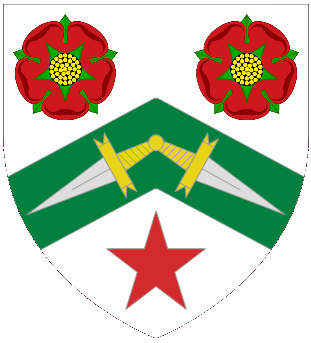
Finlay's arms displayed in the House of Lords

Writing in the Oxford Dictionary of National Biography, G. R. Rubin described Finlay as "competent but not outstanding" both at the bar and on the bench, although he praised Finlay for his courage and zeal in his drive to make governments pursue German war criminals in the face of official obstruction and disinterest. Finlay's judicial demeanour was described as dignified and courteous, if slightly pompous. In private he was said to be jovial and an engaging host.

Finlay shared his father's interest in literature, and was described by The Times as "like his father...a scholar, with a vein of old-world culture". As Reader of the Middle Temple in 1933 he delivered a noted reading on "Law and Literature".

== Family ==
In 1903, Finlay married Beatrice Marion Hall (1880–1942), daughter of Edward Kirkpatrick Hall. They had one daughter, the Hon Rosalind Mary Finlay (1914–2002), who married Vice-Admiral Sir John Hayes in 1939.

Peerage of the United Kingdom
Preceded by Robert Bannatyne Finlay	Viscount Finlay; 1929–1945	Extinct
