= Sir Alexander Matheson, 3rd Baronet =

Australian politician (1861–1929)

The Honourable Sir Alexander Matheson 3rd Baronet
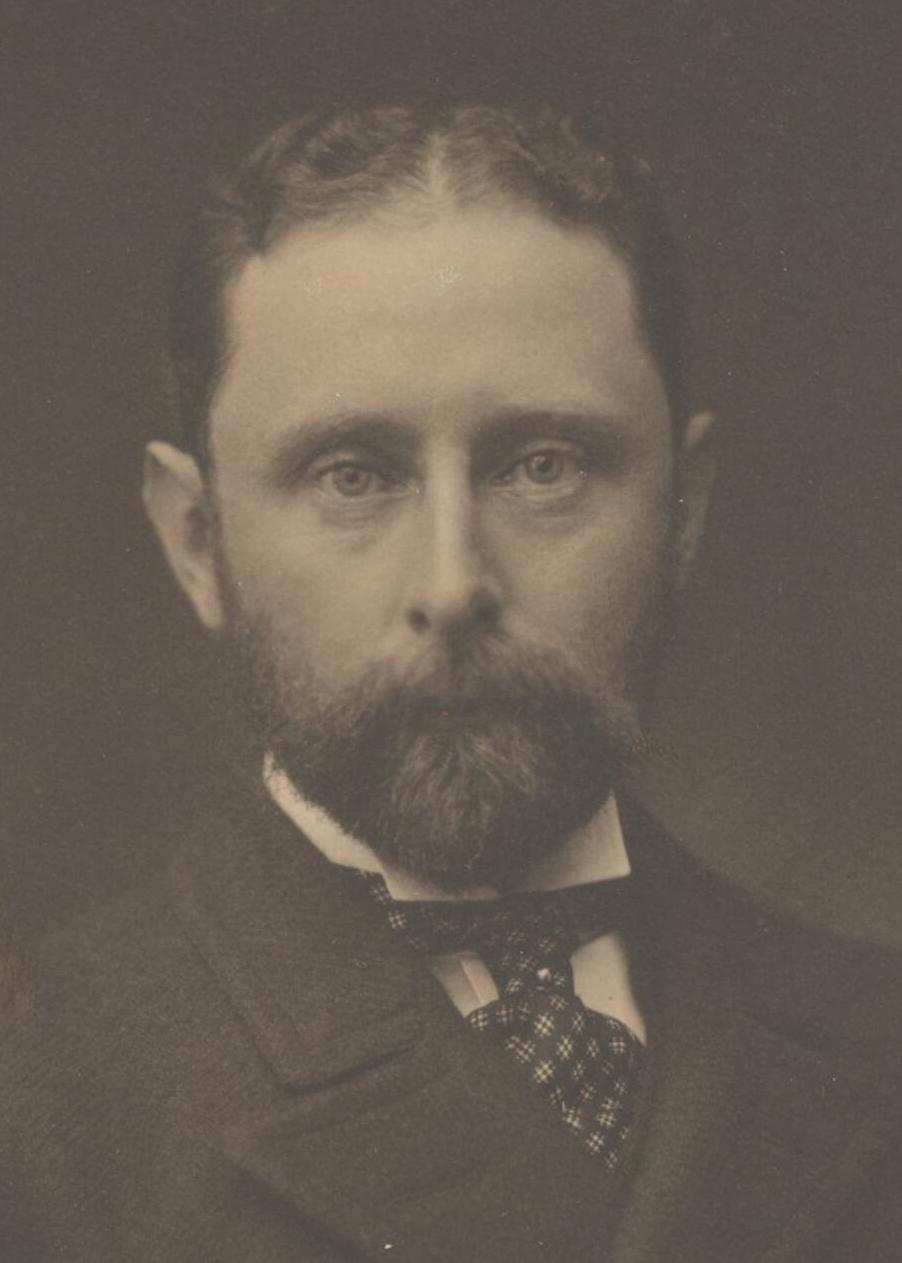

Senator for Western Australia
- In office 29 March 1901 – 31 December 1906

Member of the Western Australian Legislative Council
- In office 29 June 1897 – March 1901
- Constituency: North-East Province

Personal details
- Born: 6 February 1861 Mayfair, London, England
- Died: 6 August 1929 (aged 68) Kensington, London, England
- Party: Free Trade
- Spouse: Eleanor Money (m. 1884)
- Relations: Spencer Perceval jun. (grandfather)
- Parent(s): Sir Alexander Matheson, 1st Bt. Eleanor Perceval
- Occupation: Businessman

Sir Alexander Perceval Matheson, 3rd Baronet (6 February 1861 – 6 August 1929) was a Senator for Western Australia (1901–1906) and member of the Western Australian Legislative Council (1897–1901). He was born in London and arrived in Australia in 1894 during the Western Australian gold rush, returning to England following the end of his Senate term. He was the son of Scottish MP Sir Alexander Matheson, 1st Baronet, and succeeded to the baronetcy in 1920.

== Early life ==
Matheson was born on 8 February 1861 in Mayfair, London, England. He was the son of Alexander Matheson and his third wife Eleanor (née Perceval). His maternal grandfather was Spencer Perceval junior, his mother being a granddaughter of the assassinated British prime minister Spencer Perceval. Matheson's father, a Scotsman from Ross-shire, was a wealthy businessman and Liberal MP who was created a baronet in 1882.

Matheson was educated at Harrow School. He spent two years travelling after leaving school, and in 1884 married Eleanor Money, the daughter of an English clergyman, in New Gisborne, Victoria. The couple had seven children. In 1894, following the Western Australian gold rush, Matheson moved to Western Australia and established the Mutual Stores Company on the Eastern Goldfields. The firm was based in Coolgardie and also had branches in various smaller towns. As "Alexander Matheson & Company", he also provided finance for new mines, rented offices and rooms in Kalgoorlie, and acted as an agent for British mining firms.

== Colonial politics ==
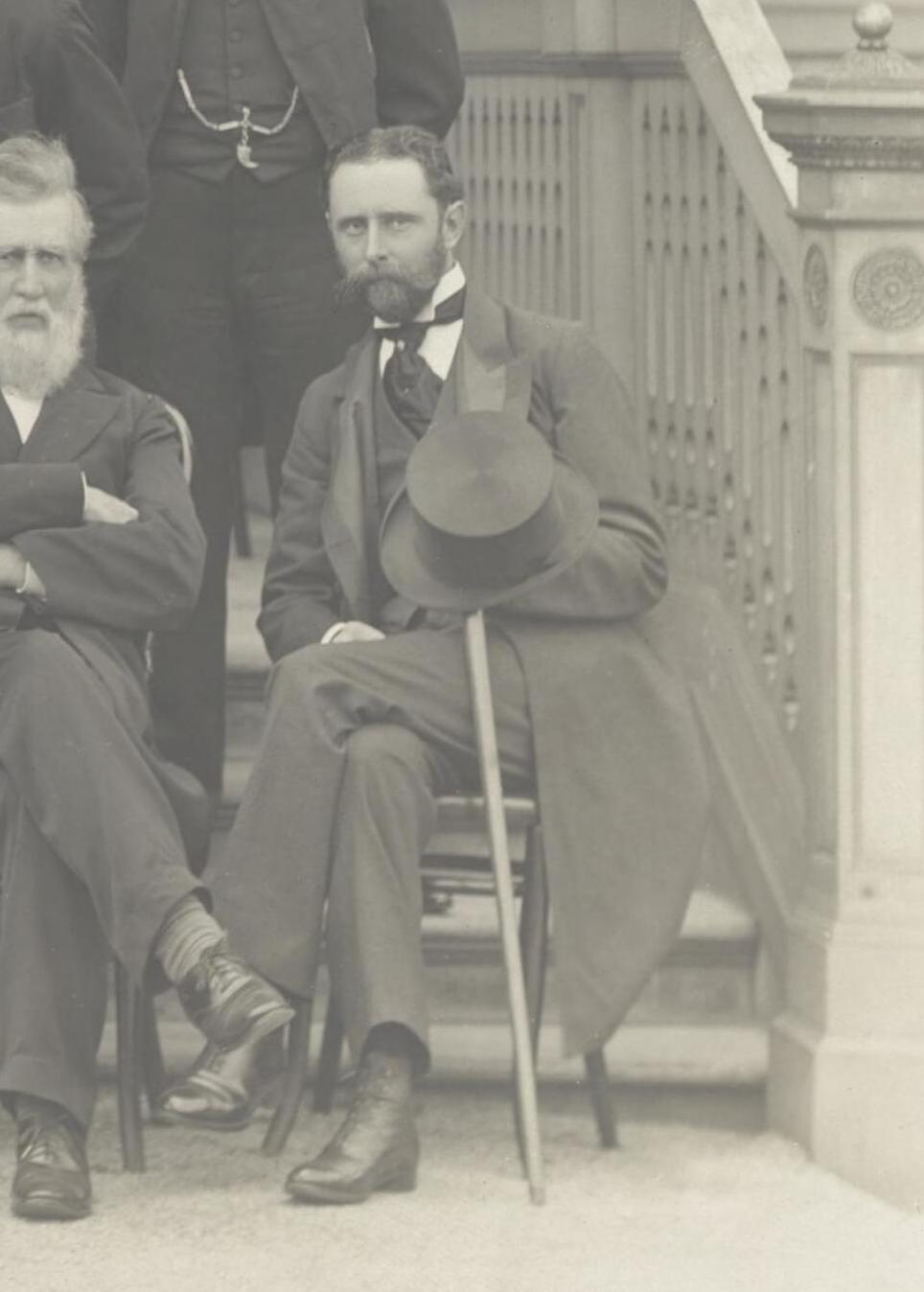
Matheson in 1899 at the final meeting of the Federal Council of Australasia

Matheson was elected to the Western Australian Legislative Council at an 1897 by-election, standing as an "advanced democrat" in North-East Province. He topped the poll, running on a platform that called for mining law reform, electoral reform, the elimination of food taxes, and regional schools of mines. Premier John Forrest subsequently appointed him as one of the colony's representatives on the Federal Council of Australasia. However, in 1900 he became president of the Eastern Goldfields Reform League, which campaigned for the creation of a separate colony on the goldfields.

After his election to the Legislative Council, Matheson brought his family to Perth where they joined the upper ranks of its society. He had earlier bought much of the present-day suburb of Applecross, which he subdivided.

== Senate ==
Matheson was elected to the Senate at the inaugural 1901 federal election. He was endorsed by the Australian Free Trade and Liberal Association, but he publicly repudiated its endorsement. His election was contested by another candidate, Henry Saunders, who sought to have the result overturned on the grounds that Matheson had offered bribes to electors and to John Croft, the secretary of the Political Labor Party in Perth. In November 1901, a Senate committee dismissed the petition on a technicality.

Matheson's election platform included support for free trade, compulsory arbitration, old-age pensions, and universal white suffrage. He supported much of the policy of the newly formed Australian Labor Party (ALP) and was a close friend of Labor MP King O'Malley, but did not join the party. As with the other Western Australian MPs, he was a strong supporter of the Trans-Australian Railway. He spoke frequently on defence matters and favoured increased defence spending.

Matheson was a strong opponent of voting rights for Indigenous Australians. In the debate over the Commonwealth Franchise Bill in 1902, he moved an amendment that would have denied all Aboriginal people the right to vote in federal elections. He stated:

Surely it is absolutely repugnant to the great number of the people of the Commonwealth that an aboriginal man, or aboriginal lubra or gin – a horrible, degraded, dirty creature – should have the same rights, simply by virtue of being 21 years of age, that we have, after some debate today, decided to give to our wives and daughters. To me it is as repugnant and atrocious a legislative proposal as anyone could suggest.

In 1903, Matheson came into renewed conflict with John Forrest, who had become the federal defence minister. He asked 17 questions in parliament about Forrest's "Minute on Naval Defence", which had attracted attention in Britain, and accused him of writing "in absurdly hyperbolic terms" in order to obtain an invitation to the 1902 Colonial Conference. In defence of Forrest, government Senate leader Richard O'Connor said that Matheson's criticisms were due to personal antipathy and that "almost every word he uttered in regard to Sir John Forrest was bubbling over with personal malice". Matheson subsequently proposed the creation of a Council of Defence in order to reduce Forrest's powers as minister, but the proposal failed to pass.

== Later life ==
Matheson did not re-contest his seat at the 1906 federal election. He wound up his business affairs in Australia and returned to England, where he was soon in financial difficulties. During World War I, all three of Matheson's sons were killed in action. He succeeded his half-brother Kenneth in the baronetcy in 1920, and shortly after moved to New Zealand where he was a correspondent for The Times. In 1925, it was announced that he was engaged to Beatrice Davison, but the marriage did not take place. By 1927 he was living in a flat in Monaco. He died at Queen's Gate, Kensington, London, on 6 August 1929 and was buried in Putney Vale Cemetery.

Baronetage of the United Kingdom
Preceded by Kenneth James Matheson	Baronet (of Lochalsh); 1920–1929	Succeeded by Roderick Mackenzie Chisholm Matheson
