= Aeneas William Mackintosh =

Scottish Liberal politician (1819–1900)

Aeneas William Mackintosh (7 September 1819 – 18 June 1900) was a Scottish Liberal politician who sat in the House of Commons from 1868 to 1874.

Mackintosh was the son of Lauchlan Mackintosh of Raigmore and his second wife, Margaret Dunbar, daughter of Sir Archibald Dunbar, 6th Baronet. He was educated at University College, Oxford. He was a J.P. and Deputy Lieutenant of Inverness-shire, Lieutenant-Colonel Commandant and later Honorary Colonel of the 1st Inverness Artillery Volunteers, and Lord of the Barony of Raigmore.

At the 1868 general election Mackintosh was elected Member of Parliament for Inverness Burghs. He lost the seat in 1874.

He was chairman of the Highland Railway from 1892 to 1897.

Mackintosh died at the age of 80.

Mackintosh married Grace Menzies, daughter of Sir Neil Menzies, 6th Baronet.

Parliament of the United Kingdom
Preceded by Alexander Matheson	Member of Parliament for Inverness Burghs; 1868 – 1874	Succeeded by Charles Fraser-Mackintosh
