= Donald MacGregor (Liberal MP) =

British politician (1839–1911)

Donald MacGregor (1839 – 20 July 1911) was a Scottish Liberal Party politician. From 1892 to 1895 he was a member of parliament (MP) for the Inverness-shire constituency.

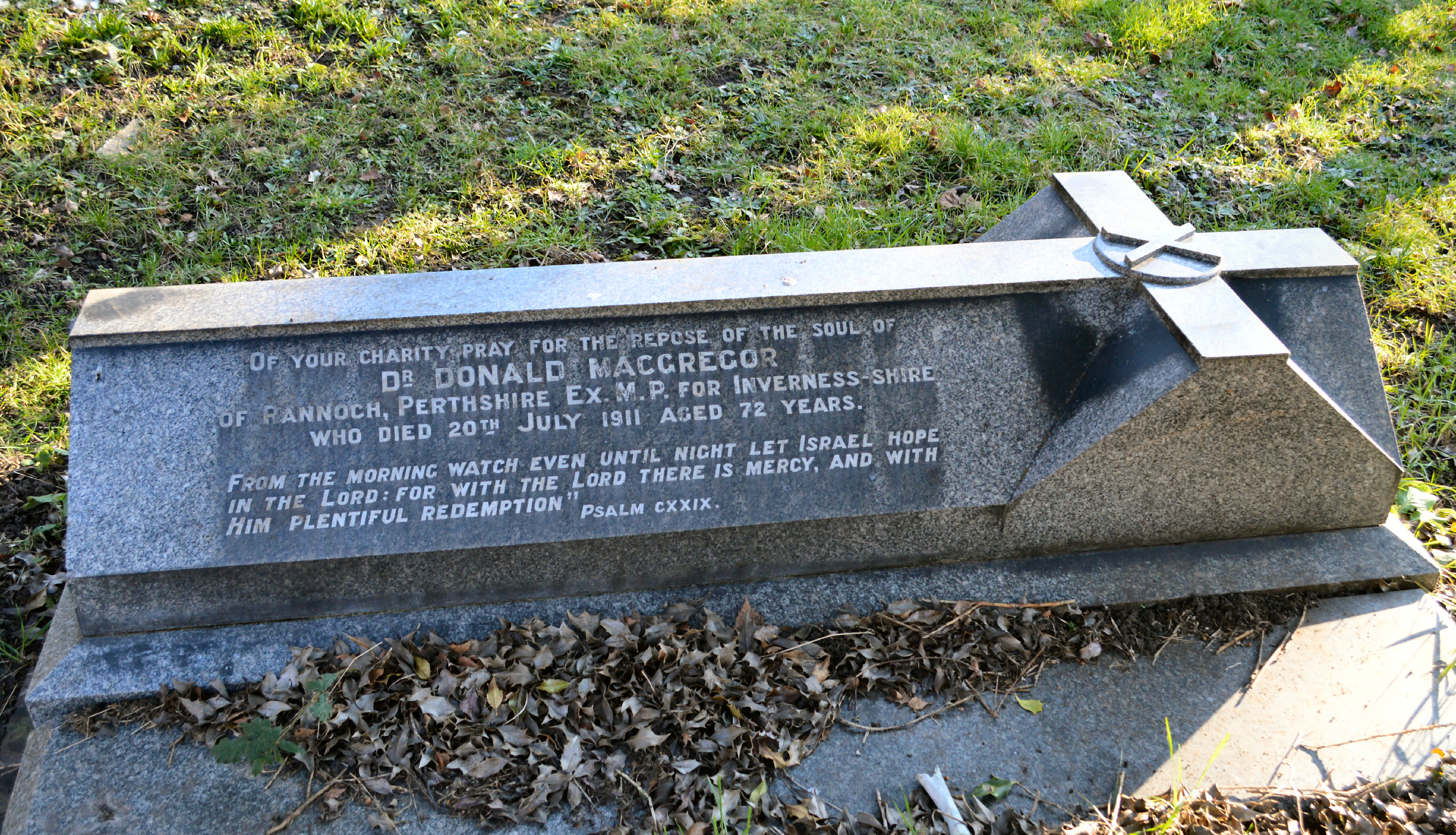
St Mary Magdalen, Mortlake

He is buried in London at St Mary Magdalen Roman Catholic Church Mortlake.

== Sources ==
- Leigh Rayment's Historical List of MPs – Constituencies beginning with "I"

Parliament of the United Kingdom
Preceded by Charles Fraser-Mackintosh	Member of Parliament for Inverness-shire; 1892–1895	Succeeded by James Evan Bruce Baillie
