= Forres (Parliament of Scotland constituency) =

Scottish parliamentary constituency

Forres in Elginshire was a burgh constituency that elected one commissioner to the Parliament of Scotland and to the Convention of Estates.

After the Acts of Union 1707, Forres, Fortrose, Nairn and Inverness formed the Inverness district of burghs, returning one member between them to the House of Commons of Great Britain.

== List of burgh commissioners ==
- 1661: John Layne, bailie
- 1665 convention: Francis Forbes of Thornhill
- 1667 convention: Harie Ross
- 1669–1672, 1678 convention: Patrick Tulloch of Boigton, provost
- 1681–82: Thomas Urquhart
- 1685–86: James Smith, heritor
- 1689 convention, 1689: Thomas Tulloch (declared absent)
- 1693–1702: William Brodie of Whitewreath
- 1702–07: George Brodie of Ailisk

== See also ==
- List of constituencies in the Parliament of Scotland at the time of the Union
