= Viscount Finlay =

Title in the Peerage of the United Kingdom

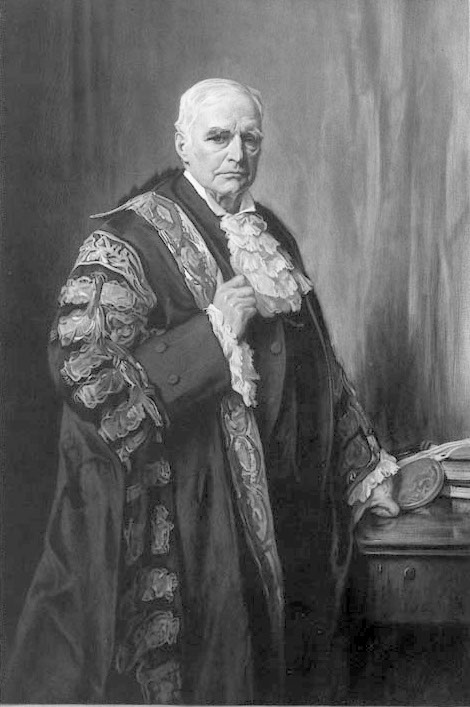
Robert Finlay, 1st Viscount Finlay

Viscount Finlay, of Nairn in the County of Nairn, was a title in the Peerage of the United Kingdom. It was created on 27 March 1919 for the lawyer and politician Robert Finlay, 1st Baron Finlay. He had already been created Baron Finlay, of Nairn in the County of Nairn, on his appointment as Lord Chancellor in 1916. He was succeeded by his only son, the second Viscount, who was a Lord Justice of Appeal. Both titles became extinct on his death in 1945.

== Viscounts Finlay (1919) ==
- Robert Bannatyne Finlay, 1st Viscount Finlay (1842–1929)
- William Finlay, 2nd Viscount Finlay (1875–1945)

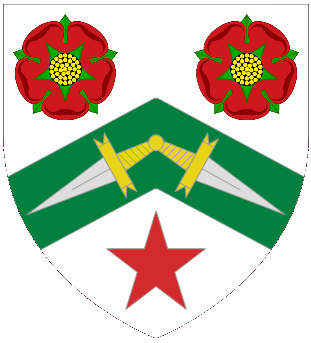
Finlay's arms displayed in the House of Lords
