= Inverness (Parliament of Scotland constituency) =

Constituency of the Old Parliament of Scotland

Inverness was a burgh constituency that elected one commissioner to the Parliament of Scotland and to the Convention of Estates.

After the Acts of Union 1707, Inverness, Forres, Fortrose and Nairn formed the Inverness district of burghs, returning one member between them to the House of Commons of Great Britain.

== List of burgh commissioners ==
- 1661–63, 1678 convention: Alexander Cuthbert, provost
- 1665 convention: not represented
- 1667 convention:Robert Barbour
- 1669–74: Fraser Finlay, bailie
- 1681–82: William Duff, bailie
- 1685–86, 1689 convention, 1689–1701: John Cuthbert of Drakies, merchant, provost
- 1702–07: Alexander Duff of Drumure

== See also ==
- List of constituencies in the Parliament of Scotland at the time of the Union
