= Charles Fraser-Mackintosh =

British politician

Charles Fraser-Mackintosh FSA Scot (Scottish Gaelic: Teàrlach Friseal Mac an Tòisich; 1828 – 25 January 1901) was a Scottish lawyer, land developer, author, and independent Liberal and Crofters Party politician. He was a significant champion of the Scottish Gaelic language in Victorian Britain.

Fraser-Mackintosh was the son of Alexander Fraser, of Dochnalurg, Inverness, and his wife Marjory Mackintosh. He assumed the additional surname of Mackintosh by royal licence 1857. He trained as a lawyer and became a councillor in Inverness. He was heavily involved in land and development in the town and was chairman of the Anglo-American Land Mortgage and Agency Co. Using money he made from the construction of Union Street, in which he made a large number of people homeless [see The Life and Times of Fraser Mackintosh, pages 23 to 34] he bought and laid out the Drummond estate (1863), which had previously belonged to Fraser-Mackintosh's great-great uncle Provost Phineas Mackintosh and Ballifeary estates (1860s). Fraser-Mackintosh was also a captain in the Inverness-shire Rifle Volunteers from 1860 and a J.P. for Inverness-shire.

As a lawyer, he had access to many rare manuscripts and documents, and these formed the basis for his own published works on Scottish history. In his historical work, Fraser-Mackintosh admitted to a sympathy for the Jacobite cause of "Bonnie Prince Charlie," due to being indirectly named after the prince via various Jacobite ancestors. He was a Fellow of the Society of Antiquaries of Scotland. In 1875, he was Chief of the Gaelic Society of Inverness. He was the third President of An Comunn Gaidhealach, the national Gaelic Society, serving from 1896 to 1898.

It is thought that Fraser-Mackintosh rendered legal assistance to Mairi Mhòr nan Oran when she was accused of theft from her employer in 1872. He appears to have recruited to her cause by John Murdoch and to have earned her enduring gratitude and affection. He is one of the land rights campaigners mentioned in her celebrated poem Nuair a chaidh na ceithir ùr oirre. Fraser-Mackintosh was elected Member of Parliament (MP) for Inverness Burghs in 1874 and held the seat until the 1885 general election. Initially he was opposed to agrarian unrest, arguing that negative consequences would occur if Scottish Gaels adopted the tactics of the Irish Land League and came to be seen as "discontented and disaffected." Later he changed his mind and was returned as the MP for Inverness-shire for the Crofter's Party in 1885. He was returned unopposed in 1886, but opposing home rule for Ireland, he joined the Liberal Unionist Party, and lost the support of the local Highland Land League. The League backed Liberal Party candidate Donald MacGregor at the 1892 election, who unseated Fraser-Mackintosh. He was then the only Gaelic-speaking member of the Commons and became known as the 'Member for the Highlands'. One of five members of the Napier Commission, set up in 1883, to investigate the crofters' situation; he was the driving force behind the establishment of the Crofters' Commission and for promoting the use of Gaelic in Highland schools. His efforts led to the establishment of a Free Library in Inverness in 1883.

Fraser-Mackintosh died at the age of 72 and is buried in Kensal Green Cemetery.

Fraser-Mackintosh married Eveline May Holland of Brooklands, Streatham in 1876. His widow left his personal library of over 5000 books and journals to Inverness Burgh library in 1921.

== Publications ==
- Dunachton, past and present (1866)
- Letters of Two Centuries (1890)
- The Last Macdonalds of Isla (1895)
- An account of the confederation of clan Chattan (1898)
- Antiquarian notes (1897)

Parliament of the United Kingdom
| Preceded by Aeneas William Mackintosh | Member of Parliament for Inverness Burghs; 1874–1885 | Succeeded by Robert Finlay |
| Preceded by Donald Cameron | Member of Parliament for Inverness-shire; 1885–1892 | Succeeded by Donald MacGregor |
