= Sir Alexander Grant, 5th Baronet =

Scottish slave trader and planter

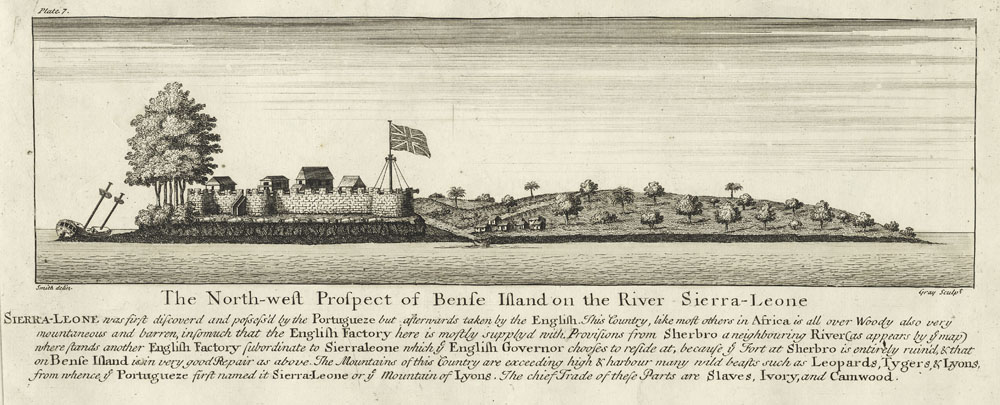
The slave fort of Bunce Island in 1727

Sir Alexander Grant, 5th Baronet (1 July 1705 – 1 August 1772) was a Scottish slave trader and planter who was active in the City of London in the mid-18th century. Alongside fellow Scottish slaver Richard Oswald, he owned Bunce Island in Sierra Leone. Alexander was born in Dalvey, Inverness-shire, the son of Sir Patrick Grant, 4th Baronet. He took a correspondence course with the University of Aberdeen in pharmacy. However, when the family finances were affected by their support for the Jacobites, he emigrated to the British colony of Jamaica in 1721, where he practiced in "Physick and Chiurgery". By 1730 he bought a plantation of 300 acres in Saint Elizabeth Parish. He also went into business with Peter Beckford, leasing a storehouse from which they sold supplies to their fellow plantation owners.

Parliament of the United Kingdom
Preceded by John Campbell of Cawdor	Member of Parliament for Inverness Burghs; 1761–1768	Succeeded by Hector Munro
Baronetage of Nova Scotia
Preceded by Patrick Grant	Baronet (of Dalvey); 1755–1772	Succeeded by Ludovic Grant
