= Nairn (Parliament of Scotland constituency) =

Constituency of the Old Parliament of Scotland in Highland, Scotland

Nairn was a burgh constituency that elected one commissioner to the Parliament of Scotland and to the Convention of Estates.

After the Acts of Union 1707, Nairn, Forres, Fortrose and Inverness formed the Inverness district of burghs, returning one member between them to the House of Commons of Great Britain.

== List of burgh commissioners ==
- 1567: Name not known
- 1617: Alexander Dunbar
- 1639–41, 1649: John Tulloch
- 1648: John Rose
- 1649: Hugh Rose of Kilravock
- 1661: John Rose
- 1665 convention: William Rose
- 1667 convention: William Rose
- 1669–72: Alexander Rose
- 1678 convention: David Rose
- 1681–2: Hugh Rose, yr of Broadley
- 1685–6: Alexander Falconer (son of Bishop Falconer)
- 1689 convention: John Rose
- 1689–1702: John Rose
- 1703–7: John Rose

== See also ==
- List of constituencies in the Parliament of Scotland at the time of the Union
