= Milbank baronets =

Baronetcy in the Baronetage of the United Kingdom

Milbank Baronetcy
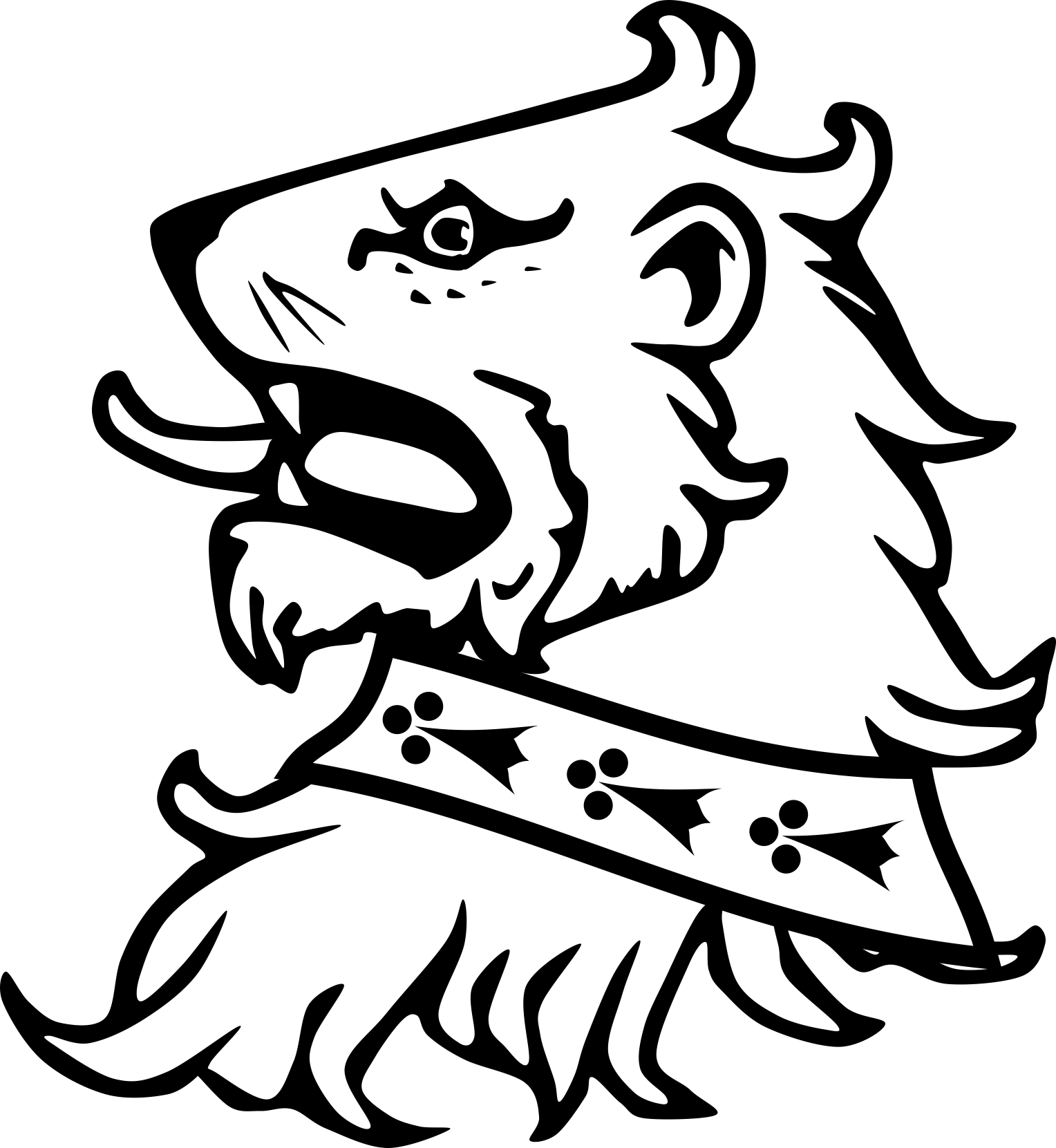
- Heraldic Symbol of the Milbank Family
- Creation date: 16 May 1882
- First holder: Sir Frederick Milbank
- Present holder: Sir Edward Milbank
- Seat: Barningham Park

The Milbank baronetcy, of Well in the County of York, and of Hart in the County of Durham, is a title in the Baronetage of the United Kingdom. It was created on 16 May 1882 for Frederick Milbank, Member of Parliament for the North Riding of Yorkshire from 1865 to 1885, and for Richmond from 1885 to 1886.

The 2nd Baronet represented Radnorshire in the House of Commons as a Conservative, from 1895 to 1900. The 4th Baronet was Master of the Household between 1954 and 1967. The 5th Baronet won awards for game conservancy.

== Milbank baronets, of Well and Hart (1882) ==
- Sir Frederick Acclom Milbank, 1st Baronet (1820–1898)
- Sir Powlett Charles John Milbank, 2nd Baronet (1852–1918)
- Sir Frederick Richard Powlett Milbank, 3rd Baronet (1881–1964)
- Sir Mark Vane Milbank, 4th Baronet (1907–1984)
- Sir Anthony Frederick Milbank, 5th Baronet (1939–2016)
- Sir Edward Mark Somerset Milbank, 6th Baronet (born 1973)

The heir apparent is the present holder's son Harry Frederick Somerset Milbank (born 2009).

== See also ==
- Milbanke baronets

== Notes ==
Baronetage of the United Kingdom
Preceded by Matheson baronets	Milbank baronets of Well and Hart; 16 May 1882	Succeeded by Bass baronets
