= Gilbert Beith =

British politician (1827–1904)

- Born: 1827
- Died: 5 July 1904
- Occupation: Politician

Gilbert Beith (5 July 1827 – 5 July 1904) was a Scottish merchant and Liberal politician.

Beith was the son of the Rev. Alexander Beith, D.D., and brother of Ian Hay Beith, of Stirling. He was a partner in the firm of Beith, Stevenson, & Co., export merchants of Glasgow and Manchester, and a Director of the Glasgow Chamber of Commerce.

At the 1885 general election, Beith was elected as the member of parliament (MP) for Glasgow Central, but at the 1886 election he lost the seat in a large swing to the Conservative Party candidate. He was returned to the House of Commons at the 1892 general election as the MP for Inverness Burghs, and held that seat until he stood down at the next election, in 1895.

== Family ==
His daughter Jane Fordyce Beith married Frederick Moir.

Parliament of the United Kingdom
New constituency see Glasgow	Member of Parliament for Glasgow Central; 1885 – 1886	Succeeded by John George Alexander Baird
Preceded by Robert Finlay	Member of Parliament for Inverness Burghs; 1892 – 1895	Succeeded by Robert Finlay
