= James Morrison (businessman) =

British businessman (1789–1857)

James Morrison (1789–1857) was a British millionaire businessman and Whig Member of Parliament.

== Upbringing and family ==
Morrison was the son of an innkeeper from Middle Wallop in Hampshire. He married Mary Anne, daughter of Joseph Todd, a London draper; he continued the drapery business and quickly made it one of the most profitable in the world.

His children included Alfred Morrison, of Fonthill, who was High Sheriff of Wiltshire in 1857, a notable art collector (see The Morrison Triptych), the father of Hugh and Major James Archibald Morrison of Fonthill and Basildon; Charles of Basildon Park and Islay; Frank of Hole Park, Kent, and Strathraich, Ross; and Walter Morrison of Malham Tarn, Yorkshire.

== Career ==
Morrison began his career working in a London warehouse. Effort eventually secured him a partnership in the general drapery business in Fore Street, London of Joseph Todd, whose daughter he married. The firm became known as Morrison, Dillon & Co, and later was converted into the Fore Street Limited Liability Company.

Morrison worked to small margins, with a rapid circulation of capital, his motto being "small profits and quick returns". He made a fortune, much of which went to buying land in Berkshire, Buckinghamshire, Kent, Wiltshire, Yorkshire, and Islay in Argyllshire, an island he purchased for nearly £½m in 1854. In his Life and Correspondence, Robert Southey records how he saw Morrison at Keswick in September 1823. He was then worth some £150,000 and was on his way to New Lanark on the Clyde. He intended investing £5,000 in Robert Owen's philanthropic community "if he should find his expectations confirmed by what he sees there".

From his arrival in London, Morrison was associated with the Whig Party in the city. In 1830, he entered Parliament as member for St Ives, Cornwall, which he helped to partially disfranchise by voting for the Great Reform Bill. In 1831, he secured a seat at Ipswich, for which he was again elected in December 1832. He was, however, defeated there on the 'Peel Dissolution' in January 1835. On an election petition, Fitzroy Kelly and Robert Adam Dundas, the members, were unseated and Morrison, with Rigby Wason, headed the poll in June 1835. At the succeeding dissolution, in July 1837, Morrison remained out of parliament and, in the following December, on the occasion of a by-election for a vacancy at Ipswich, he was defeated in a contest with Joseph Bailey. In March 1840, he re-entered the House of Commons as member for the Inverness Burghs and was again returned unopposed in the general election of 1841 but, on the dissolution of 1847, in poor health, he finally retired.

In the 1830s, Morrison established the American trading company, Morrison, Cryder & Co., and invested heavily in the railway industry both in the United States and in France. On 17 May 1836, he made an able speech on moving a resolution urging the periodical revision of tolls and charges levied on railroads and other public works. In 1845, he moved similar resolutions and, again in March 1846, when he finally succeeded in obtaining a select committee for the better promoting and securing of the interests of the public in railway acts. His draft report, not altogether adopted, was drawn with great skill and many of its principles were adopted in subsequent legislation.

An entirely self-educated man, Morrison built up a large library. He likewise collected pictures by the Old Masters, Italian and Dutch, together with the English school of painters. It was a "collection of a very high class". Morrison housed his collection in his London house in Harley Street, and at Basildon Park in Berkshire which, by 1842, had completely replaced the Pavilion at Fonthill (Wiltshire) as his favoured country estate. It included works by Constable, Da Vinci, Hogarth, Holbein, Poussin, Rembrandt, Reynolds, Rubens, Titian, Turner, Cuyp, Jan Steen, Murillo and Van Dyck.

== Notes ==
Parliament of the United Kingdom
Preceded by Charles Arbuthnot; James Halse	Member of Parliament for St Ives; 1830–1831; With: William Pole-Tylney-Long-Wellesley	Succeeded by Edward Bulwer-Lytton; James Halse
Preceded by Charles Mackinnon; Robert Dundas	Member of Parliament for Ipswich; 1831–1835; With: Rigby Wason	Succeeded by Fitzroy Kelly; Robert Dundas
Preceded by Roderick Macleod	Member of Parliament for Inverness Burghs; 1840–1847	Succeeded by Alexander Matheson
