= Matheson baronets =

Set index for Shelley baronets

There have been two baronetcies created for persons with the surname Matheson, both in the Baronetage of the United Kingdom. As of 2026 one creation is extant.

- Matheson baronets, of The Lews (1850): see Sir James Matheson, 1st Baronet (1796–1878)
- Matheson baronets of Lochalsh (1882)
