= Robert Finlay, 1st Viscount Finlay =

British politician (1842–1929)

The Right Honourable The Viscount Finlay GCMG PC
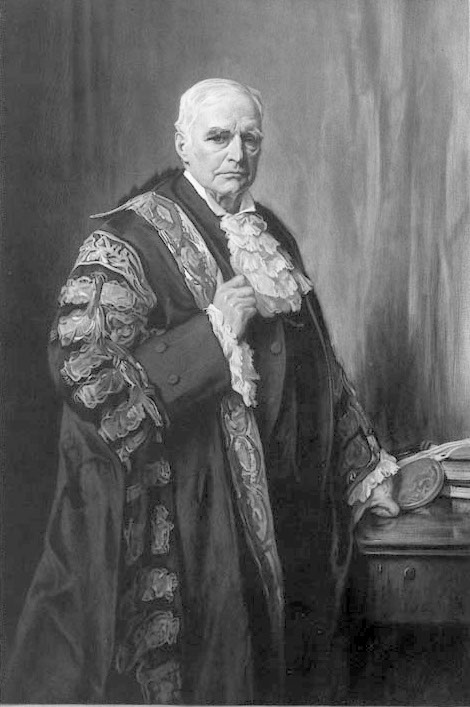
- Portrait by Henry Macbeth-Raeburn, 1917

Lord Chancellor
- In office 10 December 1916 – 10 January 1919
- Monarch: George V
- Prime Minister: David Lloyd George
- Preceded by: The Lord Buckmaster
- Succeeded by: The Lord Birkenhead

Personal details
- Born: Robert Bannatyne Finlay; 11 July 1842 Newhaven, Edinburgh
- Died: 9 March 1929 (aged 86) Kensington, London
- Party: Liberal; Liberal Unionist; Scottish Unionist
- Spouse: Mary Innes (d. 1911)
- Education: University of Edinburgh; Middle Temple

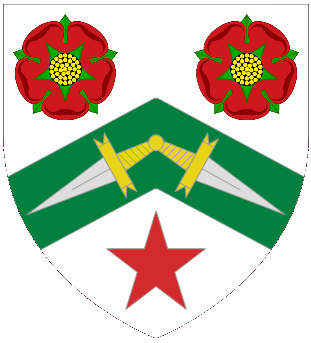
Finlay's arms displayed in the House of Lords

Robert Bannatyne Finlay, 1st Viscount Finlay, GCMG, PC (11 July 1842 – 9 March 1929), known as Sir Robert Finlay from 1895 to 1916, was a British barrister and politician who was Lord High Chancellor of Great Britain from 1916 to 1919.

== Background and education ==
Finlay was born at Cherry Bank in Newhaven, Edinburgh, the son of William Finlay, a physician, and Ann, daughter of Robert Bannatyne. He was educated at the Edinburgh Academy and Edinburgh University, graduating in medicine in 1864.

== Legal and political career ==
After entering Middle Temple as a student in 1865, Finlay was called to the bar two years later and built up a successful practice, becoming a Queen's Counsel in 1882. Three years later he was elected Liberal Member of Parliament for the Inverness Burghs, but broke with William Ewart Gladstone over Irish Home Rule and joined the Liberal Unionists in 1886. He lost his seat in 1892 but regained it three years later, the same year he was appointed Solicitor General and knighted.

In 1900, Finlay became Attorney General for England and Wales and also became President of the Edinburgh Sir Walter Scott Club, and gave the Toast to Sir Walter at the club's annual dinner. In November 1902 he was elected Lord Rector of Edinburgh University for three years, and the same month he was elected Treasurer of the Middle Temple for the ensuing year. For his services in representing the British Empire in a number of international legal arbitrations he was appointed GCMG in 1904, and the following year became a Privy Counsellor. However, in the 1906 general election he again lost his seat, and it was four years before he returned to Parliament as member for Edinburgh and St Andrews Universities.

Finally represented the White Star Line during the British inquiry into the sinking of RMS Titanic, held from April to June 1912.

One of his last official acts as Attorney General was to appoint his son, William Finlay, as the junior counsel to the Board of Inland Revenue, an appointment which provoked much negative comment.

== Judicial career ==
On 19 December 1916, Finlay became Lord Chancellor in Lloyd George's coalition government, being at the same time created Baron Finlay, of Nairn in the County of Nairn. It is generally thought that Finlay was a temporary appointment: Lloyd George excluded him from the War Cabinet and insisted that he forgo the £5,000 pension given to retired lord chancellors. He sat on the Woolsack for three years, and in 1919, on his retirement, was created Viscount Finlay, of Nairn in the County of Nairn on 27 March.

The following year he was appointed a British member of the Court of Arbitration at The Hague, and in 1921 was elected a Judge of the Permanent Court of International Justice established by the League of Nations. As a judge of the Permanent Court, he participated in the celebrated Lotus case in 1927, where the Court, by a bare majority, laid down the "Lotus principle" that States may exercise extraterritorial jurisdiction i.e. they may apply their national laws beyond their own borders, in any case where this is not explicitly prohibited. Finlay himself dissented from the majority decision.

Finlay received the freedom of the Royal burgh of Nairn on 1 October 1902.

== Family ==
Lord Finlay married Mary, daughter of Cosmo Innes, in 1874. She died in June 1911. Lord Finlay died in March 1929, aged 86, at his home in Kensington, London, and was buried at Nairn. He was succeeded in his titles by his son, William Finlay, later a Lord Justice of Appeal.

== Cases ==
- Cotman v Brougham [1918] AC 514
- Lotus case 1927 PCIJ series A No.9

Parliament of the United Kingdom
Preceded by Charles Fraser-Mackintosh	Member of Parliament for Inverness Burghs; 1885 – 1892	Succeeded by Gilbert Beith
Preceded by Gilbert Beith	Member of Parliament for Inverness Burghs; 1895 – 1906	Succeeded by John Annan Bryce
Preceded by Sir John Batty Tuke	Member of Parliament for Edinburgh & St Andrews Universities; January 1910 – 1916	Succeeded by Christopher Nicholson Johnston
Legal offices
Preceded by Sir Robert Reid	Solicitor General; 1895–1900	Succeeded by Sir Edward Carson
Preceded by Sir Richard Webster	Attorney General for England and Wales; 1900–1905	Succeeded by Sir John Walton
Political offices
Preceded by The Lord Buckmaster	Lord High Chancellor of Great Britain; 1916–1919	Succeeded by The Lord Birkenhead
Academic offices
Preceded by The Marquess of Dufferin and Ava	Rector of the University of Edinburgh; 1902–1905	Succeeded by Richard Haldane
Peerage of the United Kingdom
New creation	Viscount Finlay; 1919–1929	Succeeded by William Finlay
New creation	Baron Finlay; 1916–1929	Succeeded by William Finlay
