= John Baillie of Leys =

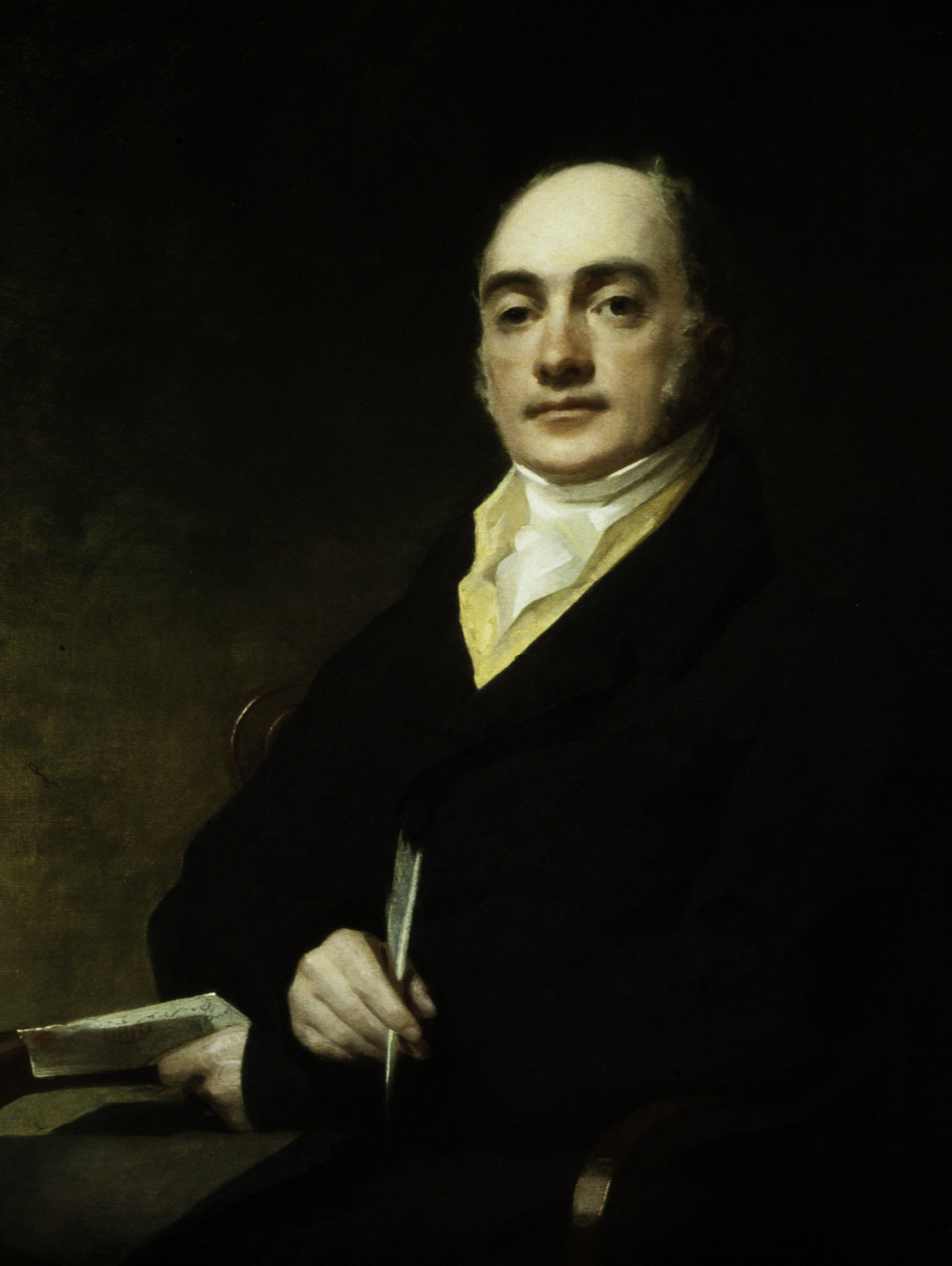
Portrait of John Baillie

Colonel John Baillie (10 May 1772 – 20 April 1833) entered the military service of the East India Company in 1790. He proved to be an excellent linguist and took up a professorship at Fort William College in Calcutta, India. In 1807 he resigned his professorship for the position of Resident at the Indian city of Lucknow which he held until 1815. In that year was commissioned a Lieutenant-Colonel of the 4th Native Infantry. He returned to the United Kingdom in 1816 and as well as managing the family estates in Inverness-shire he became Member of Parliament and a director of the East India Company.

== Biography ==
John Baillie was born at Inverness on 10 May 1772. He was the younger son of George Baillie of Leys, Inverness, and his wife, Anne. Baillie served in the East India Company from 1790 until retiring in 1818 (arriving in India in 1791 and leaving in 1816). He was commissioned an ensign in 1793 and a lieutenant in 1794, devoting his leisure to the study of oriental languages, which he prosecuted with such success that on the foundation of the new college of Fort William College in Calcutta in 1801 he was appointed professor of the Arabic and Persian languages and of Mohammedan law.

In 1803, on the outbreak of the Second Anglo-Maratha War, Baillie joined in the siege of Agra with the rank of captain, and soon after was appointed to the difficult post of Political Agent at Bundelkhand in central India. Disaffection was rife there, and the chiefs were forming dangerous combinations. Captain Baillie, however, succeeded in disuniting the league of the chiefs and re-establishing order and security, for which services he was publicly thanked by the governor-general in a letter to the directors, in which it was said that "the British authority in Bundelkhand was only preserved by his fortitude, ability, and influence". He had, in fact, transferred to the company a territory with a revenue of £225,000 a year.

Baillie resigned his professorship in 1807 for the position of Resident at the Indian city of Lucknow which he held till 1815. In that year was commissioned a Lieutenant-Colonel of the 4th Native Infantry.

Baillie returned to the United Kingdom in 1816 and as well as managing the family estates in Inverness-shire he became Member of Parliament and a director of the East India Company. He stood successfully for Parliament: for Hedon (1820–1830), Inverness Burghs (1830–1831) and again for Inverness Burghs (1832 – 20 April 1833).

He was elected as a Fellow of the Royal Society in 1817. In 1823 he became a director of the East India Company, and was willing use his influence in Parliament to support the Companies interests.

== Works ==
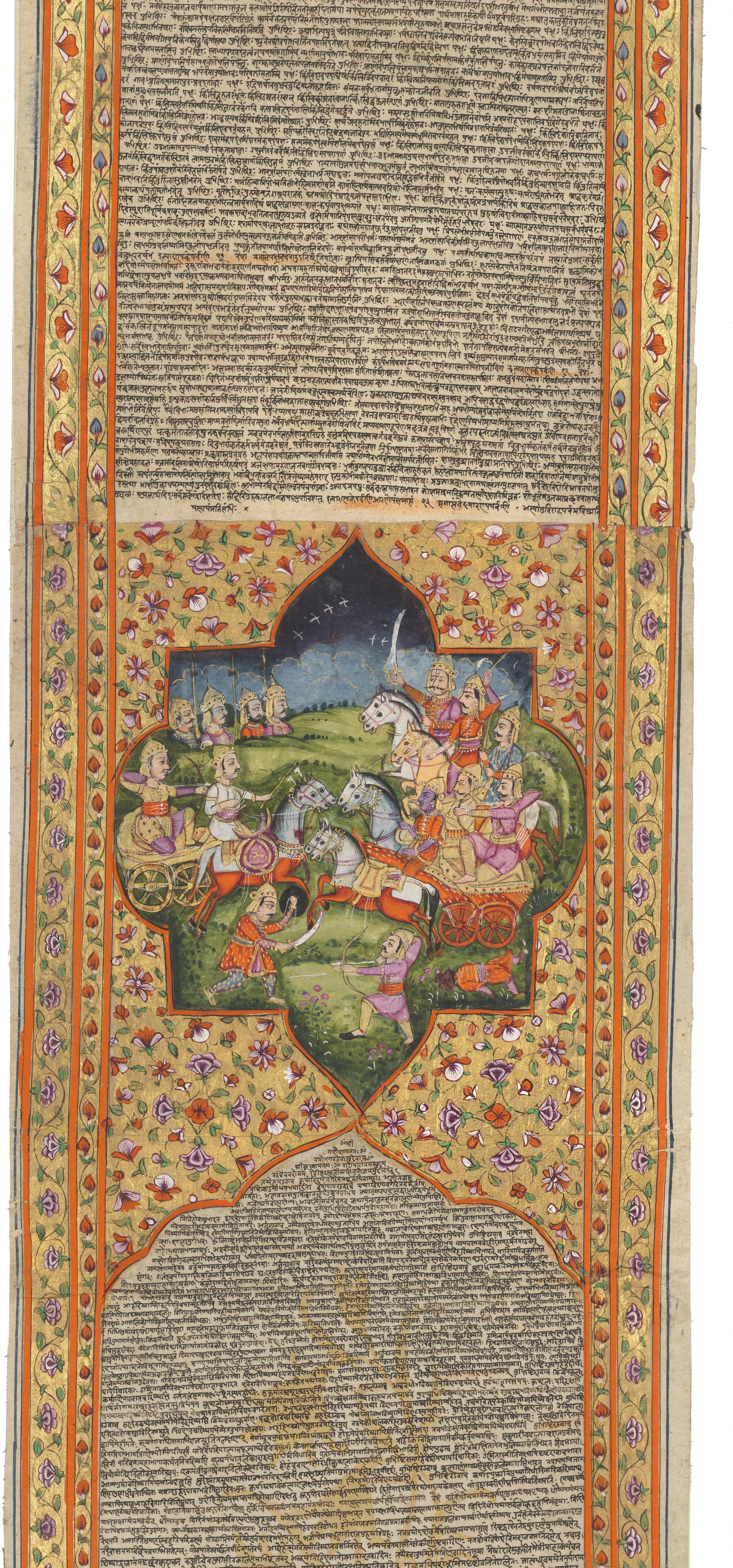
The god Krishna acts as a charioteer to Arjuna in the battle of the Bhagavad Gita, a section of the Mahabharata. Taken from an illustrated manuscript scroll, 1795 C.E., which previously belonged to John Baillie but is now held in the archive collection at the University of Edinburgh, Scotland.

While professor, John Baillie wrote:

- Sixty Tables elucidatory of a Course of Lectures on Arabic Grammar delivered in the College of Fort William during the first year of its institution (first edition 1801)
- 'The Five Books upon Arabic Grammar, i.e. the "Meeut Âmel", "Shurhu Meeut Âmel", "Mesbâh", "Hedâyut oon-Nuhve", and the "Kâfeea", of which the first four were issued in two thin volumes in 1802–3, and the last had not been published by 1900.

Baillie also translated from the Arabic part (relating to commercial transactions) of a digest of Mohammedan law in 1797, at the request of Sir John Shore (Lord Teignmouth), the then governor-general, but the work was never completed.

Baillie's position as Resident in Lucknow allowed him to amass a large collection of manuscripts, many of which later passed to the Edinburgh University Library in 1876, where they were catalogued by Edward Robertson in 1912. His collection includes paintings and illustrated manuscripts, such as the Jami al-Tawarikh, the poems of Hafiz of Sharaz. and the Mahabharata.

== Press Cutting – Morning Post 22 April 1833 – Deaths ==
On the 20th inst., at his house in Devonshire-place, in the 61st year of his age, Colonel John Baillie, of Leys, Inverness-shire, M.P. for the Inverness District of Burghs and a Director of the East India Company.
