= Napier Commission =

The Napier Commission, officially the Royal Commission of Inquiry into the Condition of Crofters and Cottars in the Highlands and Islands was a royal commission and public inquiry into the condition of crofters and cottars in the Highlands and Islands of Scotland.

The commission was appointed in 1883, with Francis Napier, 10th Lord Napier, as its chairman, under William Gladstone's Liberal government of the United Kingdom. The Royal Commission had five other members and published its report, the Report of Her Majesty's Commissioners of Inquiry Into the Condition of the Crofters and Cottars in the Highlands and Islands of Scotland, in 1884. The other members were:

- Sir Donald Cameron of Lochiel, Conservative Member of Parliament (MP) for Inverness-shire
- Sir Kenneth Mackenzie of Gairloch
- Charles Fraser-Mackintosh, MP for Inverness Burghs
- Alexander Nicolson, Sheriff of Kirkcudbright
- Professor Donald MacKinnon, first occupant of the Chair of Celtic, the University of Edinburgh.

== Historical context ==
The commission was a response to crofter and cottar agitation in the Highlands of Scotland. The agitation was about excessively high rents, lack of security of tenure and deprivation of de facto rights of access to land. It took the form of rent strikes (withholding rent payments) and what came to be known as land raids (crofter occupation of land which landlords had given over to sheep farming and to hunting parks called deer forests). Crofters' War has been used since as a name for this agitation.

In the 1870s there had been sporadic short-lived agitations in Wester Ross and Lewis (then both in the county of Ross). In the early 1880s agitation began in Skye (then in the county of Inverness) and there it became persistent and threatened to spread throughout the Hebrides and the Highlands. Police forces attempted to enforce what landlords believed to be their rights, but the police were severely overstretched, especially in Inverness-shire, where William Ivory was Sheriff Principal. Agitation became therefore an issue needing the attention of central government and, eventually, Gladstone's government appointed the Napier Commission.

About three years after the commission's appointment the Crofters' Holdings (Scotland) Act 1886 (49 & 50 Vict. c. 29) would be on the statute book. The act was not based on the recommendations of the commission, but the process by which the commission collected evidence, and the commission's report, did foster and inform the public, parliamentary and Cabinet debate which led, eventually to the legislation. The legislation was based on principles accepted in the Landlord and Tenant (Ireland) Act 1870 and Land Law (Ireland) Act 1881, principles which Napier had implicitly rejected in 1884.

According to Scottish nationalist, biographer, and historian John Lorne Campbell, the Crofters' Holdings (Scotland) Act 1886 was nothing less than "the Magna Carta of the Highlands and Islands, which conferred on the small tenants there something which the peasantry of Scandinavian countries had known for generations, security of tenure and the right to the principle of compensation for their own improvements at the termination of tenancies. Nothing was suggested in the report, or contained in the Act, to restrict absentee landlordism or limit the amount of land any one individual might own in Scotland, but for the moment a great advantage has been secured.".

== The Commission ==
Appointments to the Commission were made by the Home Secretary, Sir William Harcourt. In Napier himself the Commission had an amateur historian and anthropologist. In Nicolson and Mackinnon it had two members with good knowledge of Gaelic. Cameron and MacKenzie were obviously landlords, and Fraser-Mackintosh was an antiquarian who, as an MP, had made himself known as someone who was sympathetic to the crofters' cause.

The terms crofter, cottar and Highlands and Islands all lacked clear definition, and the Commission was left to use its own judgement as when, where and from whom to take evidence. Napier was reluctant to include Caithness, which he regarded as '"not inhabited by the Celtic race". The Commission was aware however that the government wanted a fairly early report, rather than an exhaustive inquiry, in the hope that this itself would help to quell crofter agitation.

The Commission began its work in the Hebrides, where rent strikes and land raids were most prevalent. It took evidence from crofters, landlords and others, and it moved on to tour much of what is now regarded as the Highlands and Islands area. Evidence from crofters exhibited remarkably consistent rhetoric, and there were accusations of coaching from the Highland Land League. Equally there were accusations that any crofter daring to give evidence risked being singled out for reprisals from landlords.

== Napier's report ==
The Commission was far from unanimous in its report. Many of the recommendations were those of Napier alone. For tenants whose holdings had rental values of more than £6 a year he proposed security of tenure in 30-year improving leases and township organisation. For tenants whose holdings fell below the £6-a-year threshold he recommended voluntary assisted emigration. Improving lease means a lease which includes a programme of improvement for the holding. Townships were conceived as re-establishing communal management of grazing land.

Publication of the report did bring some calm to the situation in the Highlands, but this was very short lived.

== See also ==
Crofting

Crofters Holdings (Scotland) Act 1886
