= Inverness Burghs (UK Parliament constituency) =

Parliamentary constituency in the United Kingdom, 1801–1918

- Former district of burghs constituency for the House of Commons
- Major settlements: Inverness, Fortrose, Forres, Nairn

1708–1918
- Seats: One
- Created from: Inverness, Forres, Fortrose and Nairn
- Replaced by: Inverness, Moray and Nairn and Ross and Cromarty

Inverness Burghs was a district of burghs constituency of the House of Commons of the Parliament of Great Britain (at Westminster) from 1708 to 1801 and of the Parliament of the United Kingdom (also at Westminster) from 1801 to 1918. It elected one Member of Parliament (MP).

There was also, 1708 to 1918, the Inverness-shire constituency, which was, as its name implies, a county constituency.

== Creation ==
The British parliamentary constituency was created in 1708 following the Acts of Union, 1707 and replaced the former Parliament of Scotland burgh constituencies of Inverness, Forres, Fortrose and Nairn.

== Boundaries ==
As first used in the 1708 general election Inverness Burghs consisted of four burghs: Inverness in the county of Inverness, Fortrose in the county of Ross, Forres in the county of Elgin and Nairn in the county of Nairn.

== History ==
The constituency elected one Member of Parliament (MP) by the first past the post system until the seat was abolished for the 1918 general election.

For the 1832 general election, as a result of the Representation of the People (Scotland) Act 1832, the boundaries of burghs for parliamentary election purposes ceased to be necessarily those for other purposes.

In 1918, as a result of the Representation of the People Act 1918, the component burghs of Inverness Burghs were merged into three different county constituencies: Inverness into the Inverness constituency, Forres and Nairn into the Moray and Nairn constituency and Fortrose into the Ross and Cromarty constituency. By this date, the county of Elgin had become the county of Moray and the county of Ross had been merged with the county of Cromarty to form the county of Ross and Cromarty.

== Members of Parliament ==
Elected	Member	Party
1708	Alexander Duff	
1710	George Mackenzie	Tory
1713	William Steuart	
1722	Alexander Gordon	
1722 election petition	Duncan Forbes	
1737 by-election	Duncan Urquhart	
1741	Kenneth Mackenzie	
1747	Alexander Brodie	
1754	John Campbell	
1761	Sir Alexander Grant, Bt	
1768	Sir Hector Munro	
1802	Alexander Cumming-Gordon	
1803 by-election	George Cumming	
1806	Francis Ogilvy-Grant	
1807	Peter Baillie	
1811 by-election	Charles Grant	
1818	George Cumming	Tory
1826	Robert Grant	Whig
1830	John Baillie	Tory
1831	Charles Cumming-Bruce	Tory
1832	John Baillie	Tory
1833 by-election	Charles Cumming-Bruce	Tory
1834	Charles Cumming-Bruce	Conservative
1837	Roderick Macleod	Whig
1840 by-election	James Morrison	Whig
1847	Alexander Matheson	Whig
1859 change	Alexander Matheson	Liberal
1868	Aeneas William Mackintosh	Liberal
1874	Charles Fraser-Mackintosh	Independent Liberal
1880	Charles Fraser-Mackintosh	Liberal
1885	Robert Finlay	Liberal
1886 change	Robert Finlay	Liberal Unionist
1892	Gilbert Beith	Liberal
1895	Robert Finlay	Liberal Unionist
1906	John Annan Bryce	Liberal
1918	constituency abolished	

== Election results ==
The original electoral system for this constituency gave each of the four burghs one vote, with an additional casting vote (to break ties) for the burgh where the election was held. The place of election rotated amongst the burghs in successive Parliaments. The vote of a burgh was exercised by a burgh commissioner, who was elected by the burgh councillors.

The first direct election in Inverness Burghs was in 1832. The votes from qualified electors, in each burgh, were added together to establish the result.

Unless otherwise indicated, the primary source for the results was Craig. Candidates identified by Craig as Conservatives, in the 1832-1835 Parliament, are listed as Tories. In results for elections before the formal creation of the Liberal Party, shortly after the 1859 general election, candidates identified by Craig as Liberals are divided into Whigs and Radicals following Stooks Smith. Craig's registered electorate and vote figures are sometimes different from those of Stooks Smith, but Craig's figures are used below. For details of the books of Craig and Stooks Smith, see the Reference section below.

In terms of change in % votes and swing, the Conservative candidate in 1835 is related to his performance as the Tory candidate in the 1833 by-election. As there were two Tory candidates in 1832, no swing figure was calculated for the 1833 by-election.

1760s – 1830s – 1840s – 1850s – 1860s – 1870s – 1880s – 1890s – 1900s – 1910s

=== Elections in the 1760s ===
This is an example of a contested election, before the extension of the franchise in 1832. The election took place in Fortrose, so that burgh's commissioner had the casting vote which decided the election.

General election 11 April 1768: Inverness Burghs (election at Fortrose)
Party	Candidate	Votes	%	±%
Nonpartisan	Hector Munro	3 Fortrose, Nairn	60.0	N/A
Nonpartisan	Alexander Grant	2 Forres, Inverness	40.0	N/A
Majority		1	20.0	N/A
Turnout		5 (4 electors)	100.0	N/A
Nonpartisan hold		Swing	N/A	

=== Elections in the 1830s ===
General election 1830: Inverness Burghs
Party	Candidate	Votes	%
Tory	John Baillie	Unopposed	
Registered electors		c. 72	
Tory gain from Whig			

General election 1831: Inverness Burghs
Party	Candidate	Votes	%
Tory	Charles Cumming-Bruce	Unopposed	
Registered electors		c. 72	
Tory hold			

General election 1832: Inverness Burghs
Party	Candidate	Votes	%
Tory	John Baillie	250	36.2
Whig	John Stewart (candidate)	243	35.2
Tory	Charles Cumming-Bruce	193	27.9
Radical	Robert Fraser (candidate)	6	0.9
Majority		7	1.0
Turnout		691	96.6
Registered electors		715	
Tory hold			

- Death of Baillie in April 1833

By-election, 17 May 1833: Inverness Burghs
Party	Candidate	Votes	%	±%
Tory	Charles Cumming-Bruce	357	55.2	−8.9
Whig	John Stewart (candidate)	290	44.8	+9.6
Majority		67	10.4	+9.4
Turnout		647	90.9	−5.7
Registered electors		712		
Tory hold		Swing	−9.3	

General election 1835: Inverness Burghs
Party	Candidate	Votes	%	±%
Conservative	Charles Cumming-Bruce	344	50.3	−13.8
Whig	Edward Ellice	340	49.7	+14.5
Majority		4	0.6	−0.4
Turnout		684	90.4	−6.2
Registered electors		757		
Conservative hold		Swing	−14.2	

General election 1837: Inverness Burghs
Party	Candidate	Votes	%	±%
Whig	Roderick Macleod	336	51.5	+1.8
Conservative	Sir James John Randoll Mackenzie, 6th Baronet	317	48.5	−1.8
Majority		19	3.0	N/A
Turnout		653	93.4	+3.0
Registered electors		699		
Whig gain from Conservative		Swing	+1.8	

=== Elections of the 1840s ===
- Resignation of Macleod in March 1840

By-election, 4 March 1840: Inverness Burghs
Party	Candidate	Votes	%	±%
Whig	James Morrison	353	53.5	+2.0
Conservative	John Fraser	307	46.5	−2.0
Majority		46	7.0	+4.0
Turnout		660	87.2	−6.2
Registered electors		757		
Whig hold		Swing	+2.0	

General election 1841: Inverness Burghs
Party	Candidate	Votes	%	±%
Whig	James Morrison	Unopposed		
Registered electors		757		
Whig hold				

General election 1847: Inverness Burghs
Party	Candidate	Votes	%	±%
Whig	Alexander Matheson	280	58.5	N/A
Radical	Richard Hartley Kennedy	199	41.5	N/A
Majority		81	17.0	N/A
Turnout		479	62.1	N/A
Registered electors		771		
Whig hold		Swing	N/A	

=== Elections of the 1850s ===
General election 1852: Inverness Burghs
Party	Candidate	Votes	%	±%
Whig	Alexander Matheson	Unopposed		
Registered electors		825		
Whig hold				

General election 1857: Inverness Burghs
Party	Candidate	Votes	%	±%
Whig	Alexander Matheson	382	53.3	N/A
Conservative	Alexander Campbell Cameron	335	46.7	New
Majority		47	6.6	N/A
Turnout		717	84.0	N/A
Registered electors		854		
Whig hold		Swing	N/A	

General election 1859: Inverness Burghs
Party	Candidate	Votes	%	±%
Liberal	Alexander Matheson	410	57.2	+3.9
Conservative	Alexander Campbell Cameron	307	42.8	−3.9
Majority		103	14.4	+7.8
Turnout		717	82.0	−2.0
Registered electors		874		
Liberal hold		Swing	+3.9	

=== Elections of the 1860s ===
General election 1865: Inverness Burghs
Party	Candidate	Votes	%	±%
Liberal	Alexander Matheson	Unopposed		
Registered electors		1,022		
Liberal hold				

General election 1868: Inverness Burghs
Party	Candidate	Votes	%	±%
Liberal	Aeneas Mackintosh	Unopposed		
Registered electors		1,995		
Liberal hold				

=== Elections of the 1870s ===
General election 1874: Inverness Burghs
Party	Candidate	Votes	%	±%
Independent Liberal	Charles Fraser-Mackintosh	1,134	55.9	New
Liberal	Aeneas William Mackintosh	879	43.3	N/A
Conservative	Angus Mackintosh	16	0.8	New
Majority		255	12.6	N/A
Turnout		2,029	83.9	N/A
Registered electors		2,419		
Independent Liberal gain from Liberal		Swing	N/A	

=== Elections in the 1880s ===
General election 1880: Inverness Burghs
Party	Candidate	Votes	%	±%
Liberal	Charles Fraser-Mackintosh	Unopposed		
Registered electors		2,990		
Liberal gain from Independent Liberal				

General election 1885: Inverness Burghs
Party	Candidate	Votes	%	±%
Liberal	Robert Finlay	1,709	52.5	N/A
Independent Liberal (Crofters)	Walter McLaren	1,546	47.5	New
Majority		163	5.0	N/A
Turnout		3,255	91.5	N/A
Registered electors		3,556		
Liberal hold		Swing	N/A	

- Note (1886): Shortly before the 1886 general election, the Liberal Party split. Finlay joined the new Liberal Unionist Party.

General election 1886: Inverness Burghs
Party	Candidate	Votes	%	±%
Liberal Unionist	Robert Finlay	1,619	54.6	+2.1
Liberal	Robert Peel	1,346	45.4	−7.1
Majority		273	9.2	N/A
Turnout		2,965	83.4	−8.1
Registered electors		3,556		
Liberal Unionist gain from Liberal		Swing	N/A	

=== Elections of the 1890s ===
General election 1892: Inverness Burghs
Party	Candidate	Votes	%	±%
Liberal	Gilbert Beith	1,615	50.8	+5.4
Liberal Unionist	Robert Finlay	1,562	49.2	−5.4
Majority		53	1.6	N/A
Turnout		3,177	85.3	+1.9
Registered electors		3,724		
Liberal gain from Liberal Unionist		Swing	+5.4	

General election 1895: Inverness Burghs
Party	Candidate	Votes	%	±%
Liberal Unionist	Robert Finlay	1,846	53.6	+4.4
Liberal	Henry Bell	1,596	46.4	−4.4
Majority		250	7.2	N/A
Turnout		3,442	86.6	+1.3
Registered electors		3,974		
Liberal Unionist gain from Liberal		Swing	+4.4	

- Seat vacated on the appointment of Finlay as Solicitor General for England and Wales

1895 Inverness Burghs by-election
Party	Candidate	Votes	%	±%
Liberal Unionist	Robert Finlay	Unopposed		
Liberal Unionist hold				

=== Elections of the 1900s ===
General election 1900: Inverness Burghs
Party	Candidate	Votes	%	±%
Liberal Unionist	Robert Finlay	1,829	55.5	+1.9
Liberal	J.A. Duncan	1,469	44.5	−1.9
Majority		360	11.0	+3.8
Turnout		3,298	80.7	−5.9
Registered electors		4,085		
Liberal Unionist hold		Swing	+1.9	

- Note (1900): Change and swing figures are calculated from the 1895 general election.

General election 1906: Inverness Burghs
Party	Candidate	Votes	%	±%
Liberal	John Annan Bryce	2,304	56.9	+12.4
Liberal Unionist	Robert Finlay	1,746	43.1	−12.4
Majority		558	13.8	N/A
Turnout		4,050	89.1	+8.4
Registered electors		4,547		
Liberal gain from Liberal Unionist		Swing	+12.4	

=== Elections of the 1910s ===
General election January 1910: Inverness Burghs
Party	Candidate	Votes	%	±%
Liberal	John Annan Bryce	2,440	59.7	+2.8
Liberal Unionist	Torrance McMicking	1,650	40.3	−2.8
Majority		790	19.4	+5.6
Turnout		4,090	89.9	+0.8
Liberal hold		Swing	+2.8	

General election December 1910: Inverness Burghs
Party	Candidate	Votes	%	±%
Liberal	John Annan Bryce	2,367	56.6	−3.1
Liberal Unionist	Patrick Ford	1,812	43.4	+3.1
Majority		555	13.2	−6.2
Turnout		4,179	88.6	−1.3
Liberal hold		Swing	-3.1	

- Constituency abolished (1918)

== See also ==
- Former United Kingdom Parliament constituencies
