= The Highlander (newspaper) =

- "Advocating the cause of the people, and particularly the right of the Gaelic people to their native soil."
- Format: Weekly
- Publisher: John Murdoch
- Editor: John Murdoch
- Founded: May 1873; 152 years ago
- Ceased publication: 1881
- Headquarters: Inverness
- City: Inverness
- Country: Scotland

The Highlander was a 19th-century Scottish political newspaper written in English and Scottish Gaelic. Edited by John Murdoch, the newspaper is credited with helping to revitalize the Gaelic language in Scotland. Based in Inverness, The Highlander was published weekly starting in May 1873 until it was halted due to financial issues in 1881 due to lawsuits brought on by disgruntled landowners. The newspaper's mission was "advocating the cause of the people, and particularly the right of the Gaelic people to their native soil."
