= 1900 United Kingdom general election in Scotland =

- 26 September – 24 October 1900

All 72 Scottish seats to the House of Commons
- Turnout: 75.3% (▼1.0 pp)
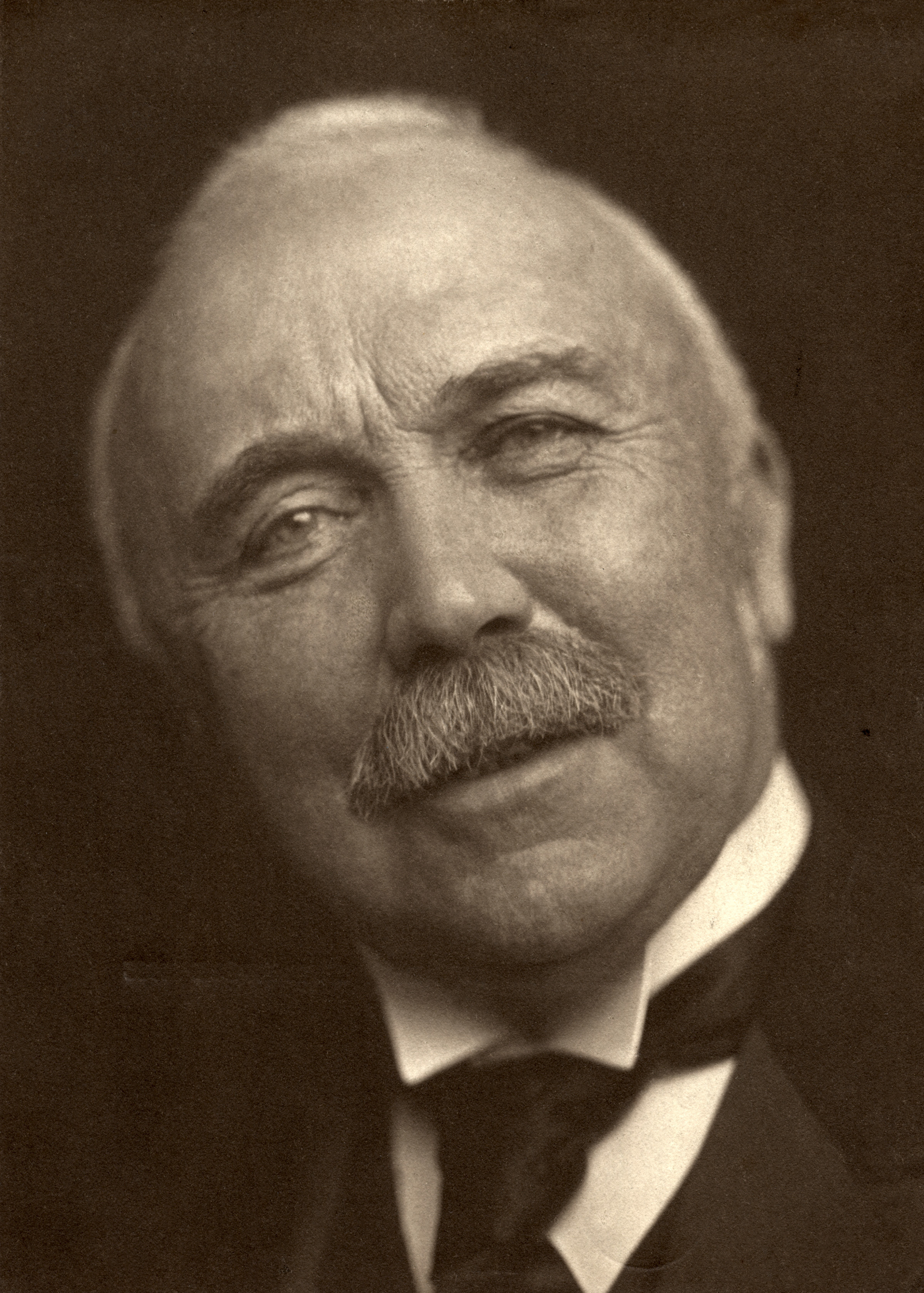

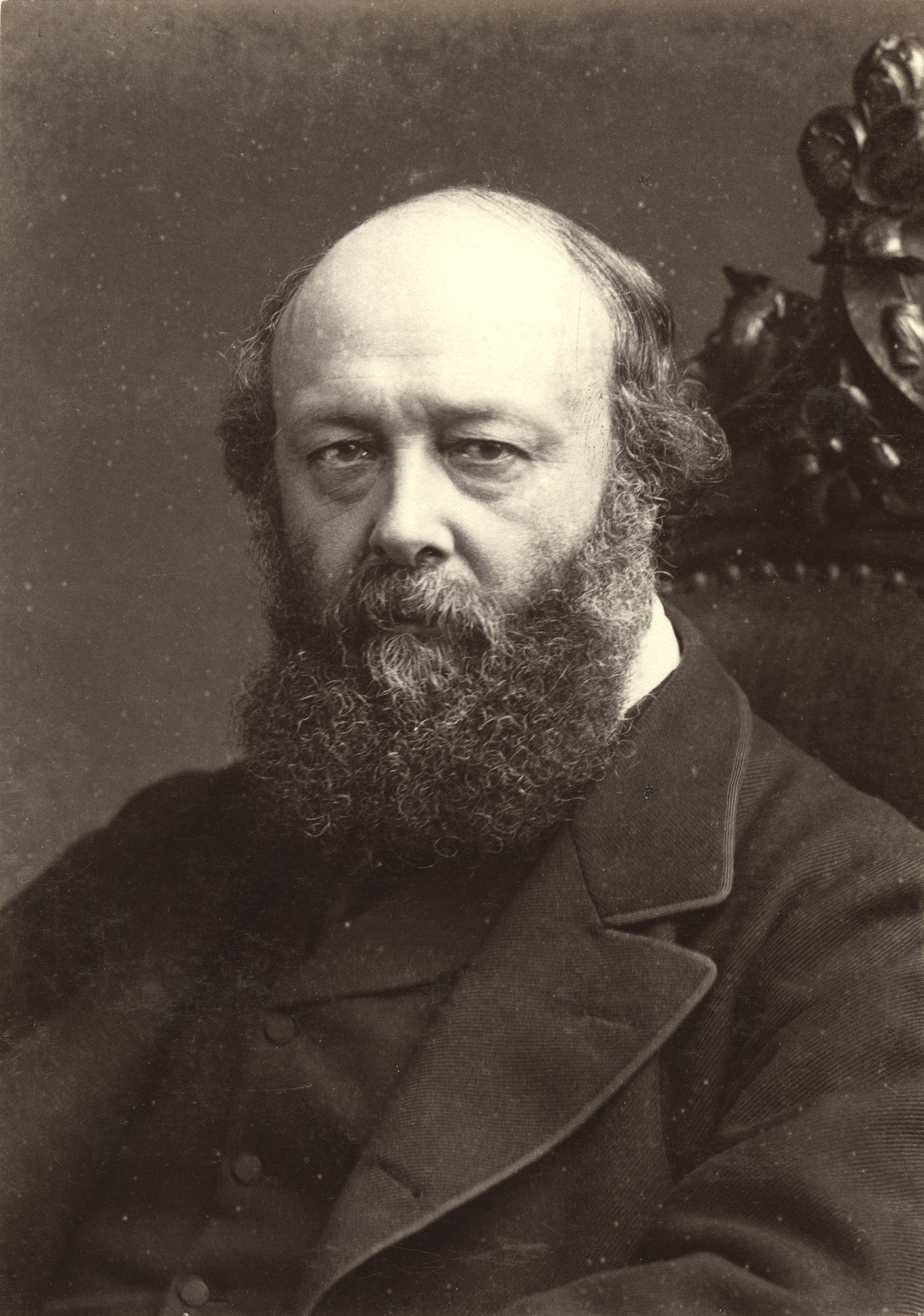

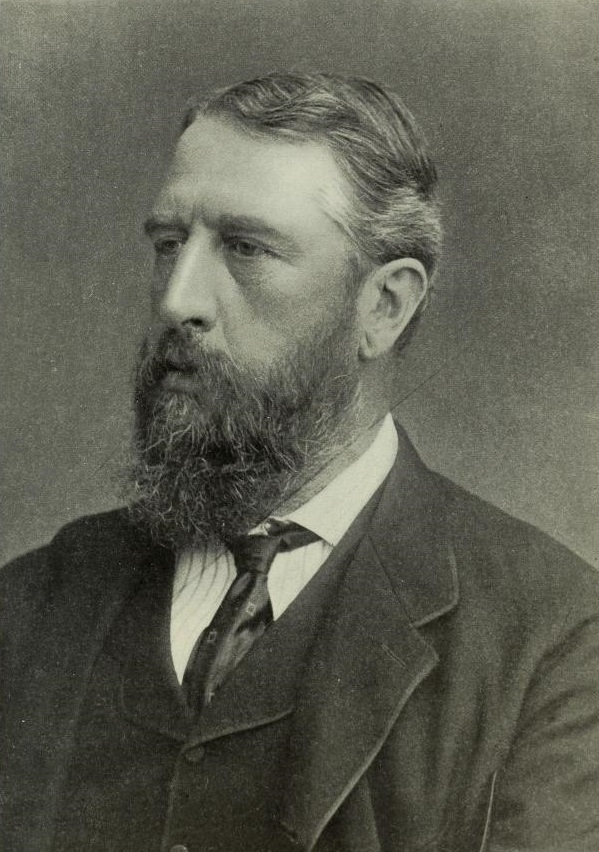
	First party	Second party	Third party
Leader	Henry Campbell-Bannerman	Marquess of Salisbury	Duke of Devonshire
Party	Liberal	Conservative	Liberal Unionist
Alliance	Liberal	Conservative-Liberal Unionist	Conservative-Liberal Unionist
Leader since	December 1898	April 1881	1886
Leader's seat	Stirling Burghs	House of Lords	House of Lords
Last election	39 seats, (Note: Combined results for burgh, county and university seats) 51.7%	19 seats, 26.8%	14 seats, 20.6%
Seats won	34	21	17
Seat change	▼5	▲2	▲3
Popular vote	245,092 (Note: Total and percentage votes given here are for territorial constituencies only)	120,030	117,187
Percentage	50.2%	24.9%	24.1%
Swing	▼1.5 pp	▼1.9 pp	▲3.5 pp
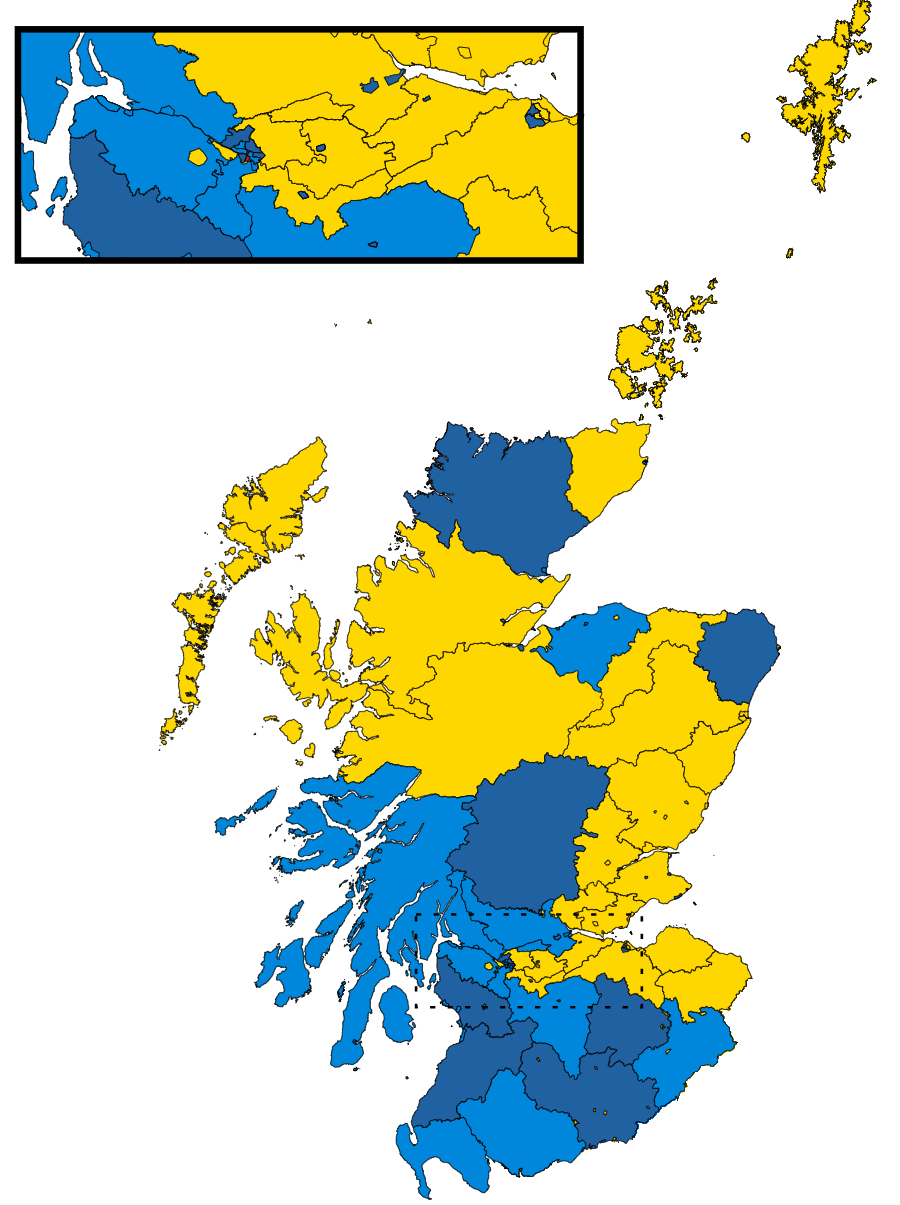
- Results of the 1900 election in Scotland for the county and burgh seats

The 1900 United Kingdom general election was held between 26 September and 24 October 1900, and members were returned for all Scottish seats. Scotland was allocated 72 seats in total, with 70 territorial seats, comprising 32 burgh constituencies and 37 county constituencies. (Note: One burgh seat, Dundee, was represented by two members of parliament.) There were also two university constituencies, Glasgow and Aberdeen Universities and Edinburgh and St Andrews Universities.

The elected was referred to as the "Khaki Election", as it was held at a time when it was widely believed that the Second Boer War had effectively been won, although would continue for another two years. The election was an attempt by the Conservative Party and its government allies, the Liberal Unionist Party, to regain the confidence of the electorate. It was also the final general election of the Victorian era, due to the death of Queen Victoria in 1901. It was the last one at which the leader of either of the two largest parties (and by extension, the incumbent Prime Minister) sat in the House of Lords rather than the House of Commons. It was also the last election during which the Marquess of Salisbury was leader of the Conservative Party, and indeed the last election he contested before his death in 1903.

== Candidates ==
Below is a table summarising the candidates of the 1900 general election in Scotland, excluding those in the university constituencies.

Affiliation	Candidates
Scottish Liberal Party	66 (Note: Includes Liberal-Labour candidate William Maxwell in Glasgow Tradeston.)
Conservative Party	39
Liberal Unionist Party	31
Scottish Workers'	1 (Note: Candidate Alfred Fletcher stood in Glasgow Camlachie.)
Crofters Party	1 (Note: Candidate Gavin Brown Clark stood in Caithness.)
Land Law Reform Association	1 (Note: Candidate F. C. Auld stood in Caithness.)
Total	139

== Analysis ==
The election in Scotland saw the Liberal Party and the alliance of the Conservative Party and Liberal Unionist Party winning almost all votes between them, with the Liberals taking over half the votes cast, whilst the Conservative and Liberal Unionist alliance secured only slightly fewer, winning 49.0% of the vote.

Despite winning more votes in Scotland than the Conservatives and Liberal Unionists the Liberals finished 4 seats behind their rivals. When combined with results from across the United Kingdom, the Conservatives, led by Lord Salisbury with their Liberal Unionist allies, secured a large majority of 134 seats, despite having received only 5.6% more votes than Henry Campbell-Bannerman's Liberals. This was largely owing to the Conservatives winning 163 seats that were uncontested by others.

=== Liberal Party ===
The Liberal Party saw a very minor 1.5% drop in vote share, taking 50.2% of the votes in Scotland, but thereby maintaining its majority in votes. However, it saw a loss of 5 seats, primarily to the Conservative Party, and some to the Liberal Unionists. It did see 1 gain in exchanges from the Conservative Party in Inverness-shire, but suffered losses to both the Conservatives and Liberal Unionists. At 34 seats, it lost its majority of seats in Scotland.

Liberal-Labour candidate, William Maxwell, stood in Glasgow Tradeston for the Liberals under its sponsorship; however, he was unsuccessful.

=== Conservative Party ===
The Conservative Party, which was in an alliance with the Liberal Unionists in Parliament and at the constituency level, saw a rise in seats at the election. With the party standing 39 candidates, it took around 24.9% of the vote, an decrease of 1.9% but with a rise in seats by 2 seats, from 19 to 21. The party held the university constituency seats of Edinburgh and St Andrews Universities and Glasgow and Aberdeen Universities. It also held the county and borough seats of Elginshire and Nairnshire, Stirlingshire, Dunbartonshire,East Renfrewshire, West Renfrewshire, Ayr Burghs, Kilmarnock Burghs, Argyllshire, Buteshire, Glasgow Central, Glasgow College, South Lanarkshire, Kirkcudbright Stewartry, Wigtownshire and Roxburghshire.

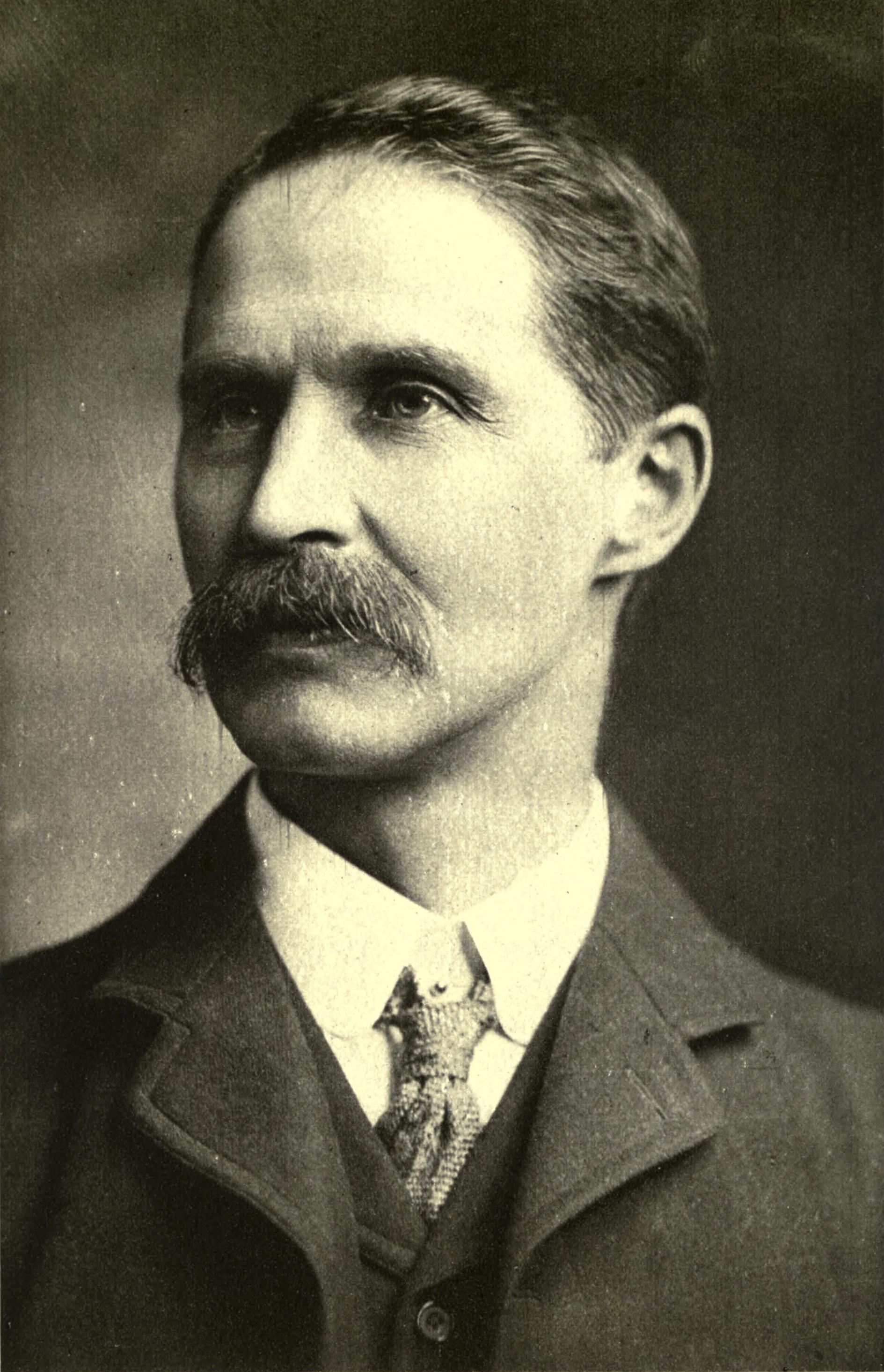
Bonar Law

Furthermore, the Conservatives won Glasgow Blackfriars and Hutchesontown and Glasgow Bridgeton from the Liberal Party, but Lost Inverness-shire to the Liberals. In Glasgow Blackfriars and Hutchesontown, future Prime Minister Bonar Law entered Parliament for the first time.

Between the constituency and parliamentary alliance with the Liberal Unionists, the Conservatives won Greenock in an exchange with the Liberal Unionist Party. In the seat, Liberal Unionist MP Thomas Sutherland did not stand for re-election, with Conservative candidate James Reid winning the seat for the party, but was otherwise a retain within the alliance. The Conservatives also won Wick Burghs from the Liberal Unionists, with candidate Arthur Bignold taking the seat. Conversely, however, it lost Glasgow St Rollox to the Liberal Unionist Party. Incumbent Conservative MP Ferdinand Begg did not stand for re-election, with Liberal Unionist John Wilson winning the seat, also retaining it within the alliance. Overall, the Conservative Party saw a loss of 2 seats but a gain of 4, taking of 21 seats at this election, which was an overall gain of two compared with the previous election.

=== Liberal Unionist Party ===
The Liberal Unionist Party won around 24.1% of the vote, with the party standing 31 candidates in Scotland, an increase 3.5% in terms of vote share. With the Conservative Party standing 39 candidates in Scotland (and two in the University constituencies), and with neither party standing against each other, the alliance covered all seats in Scotland. Of note, in the seat of writer Arthur Conan Doyle unsuccessfully stood in Edinburgh Central. He would stand again in 1906 in the seat of Hawick Burghs. The Liberal Unionists retained the seats of Inverness Burghs, West Perthshire, Falkirk Burghs, St Andrews Burghs, North Ayrshire, South Ayrshire, Glasgow Camlachie, Glasgow Tradeston, Partick, Edinburgh South, Edinburgh West and Peebles and Selkirk.

It also gained Orkney and Shetland, Sutherland, East Aberdeenshire and Dumfriesshire. Overall, when combined with the single loss in Greenock by exchange with the Conservatives and gain of Glasgow St Rollox from the Conservatives, the party saw a rise in seats from 13 at the previous election to 17 seats. Between the alliance of the parties, they held 38 of the 72 seats in Scotland, and held 49.0% of the vote share.

=== Other parties ===
The Scottish Workers' Representation Committee contested their first election. Candidate Alfred Fletcher stood in Glasgow Camlachie, but was unsuccessful. This organisation would later evolve in the Scottish branch of the Labour Party.

Crofters Party candidate Gavin Brown Clark stood in Caithness. Clark had held the seat since the 1885 United Kingdom general election in Scotland as both Leader of the Crofters Party and a sponsored and supporting Liberal MP; however, he was replaced by Liberal candidate Leicester Harmsworth in the seat. Harmsworth won the seat, technically thereby retaining it for the Liberal Party, but with Clark leaving parliament at this election.

== Seats summary ==
Below is a table summarising the total number of seats, gains and losses for each party in both the territorial county and burgh constituencies and the university constituencies.

Party	Seats				
Party	Total	Gains	Losses	Net	Of all (%)
Conservative-Liberal Unionist	38	9	4	▲5	52.8
Conservative	21	4	2	▲2	29.2
Liberal Unionist	17	5	2	▲3	23.6
Liberal	34	1	6	▼5	47.2
Total	72				

== County and burgh results ==
Party	Seats					Aggregate votes		
Party	Total	Gains	Losses	Net	Of total (%)	Total	Of total (%) (Note: Adjusted for multi-member constituencies.)	Change (%)
Liberal	34	1	6	▼5	48.6	245,092	50.2	▼1.5
Conservative-Liberal Unionist	36	8	3	▲5	51.4	237,217	49.0	▲1.6
Conservative	19	4	2	▲2	27.1	120,030	24.9	▼1.9
Liberal Unionist	17	5	2	▲3	24.3	117,187	24.1	▲3.5
Scottish Workers'	0	New			—	3,107	0.6	New
Crofters	0	Did not stand in 1895			—	673	0.1	—N/a
Land Law Reform	0	New			—	141	0.0	New
Total	70			0	100.0	486,230	100.0	0.0
Registered voters, and turnout						628,488 (Note: Electorate in contested constituencies. The total electorate was 661,748.)	75.3	▼1.0

=== Popular vote ===
Popular vote
Liberal	50.2%
Conservative	24.9%
Liberal Unionist	24.1%
Scottish Workers	0.6%
Other	0.2%

Popular vote (alliances)
Liberal	50.2%
Con-LU	49.0%
Scottish Workers	0.6%
Other	0.2%

=== Parliament seats ===
Parliamentary seats
Liberal	47.2%
Conservative	29.2%
Liberal Unionist	23.6%

Parliamentary seats (alliances)
Con-LU	52.8%
Liberal	47.2%

== University constituency results ==
The two university constituencies each elected an additional member to the house. In this election both seats were uncontested, with the winning candidates being elected unopposed.

=== Edinburgh and St Andrews Universities ===
General election 1900: Edinburgh and St Andrews Universities
Party	Candidate	Votes	%	±%
Conservative	John Batty Tuke	Unopposed		
Conservative hold				

=== Glasgow and Aberdeen Universities ===
General election 1900: Glasgow and Aberdeen Universities
Party	Candidate	Votes	%	±%
Conservative	James Alexander Campbell	Unopposed		
Conservative hold				

== See also ==
- 1900 United Kingdom general election in England
- 1900 United Kingdom general election in Ireland
- 1900 United Kingdom general election in Wales
- List of United Kingdom Parliament constituencies (1885–1918) by region
