= 1900 United Kingdom general election in Wales =

- 26 Sept. – 24 Oct. 1900

All 34 Welsh seats to the House of Commons
- Turnout: 76.4% (▼2.9 pp)
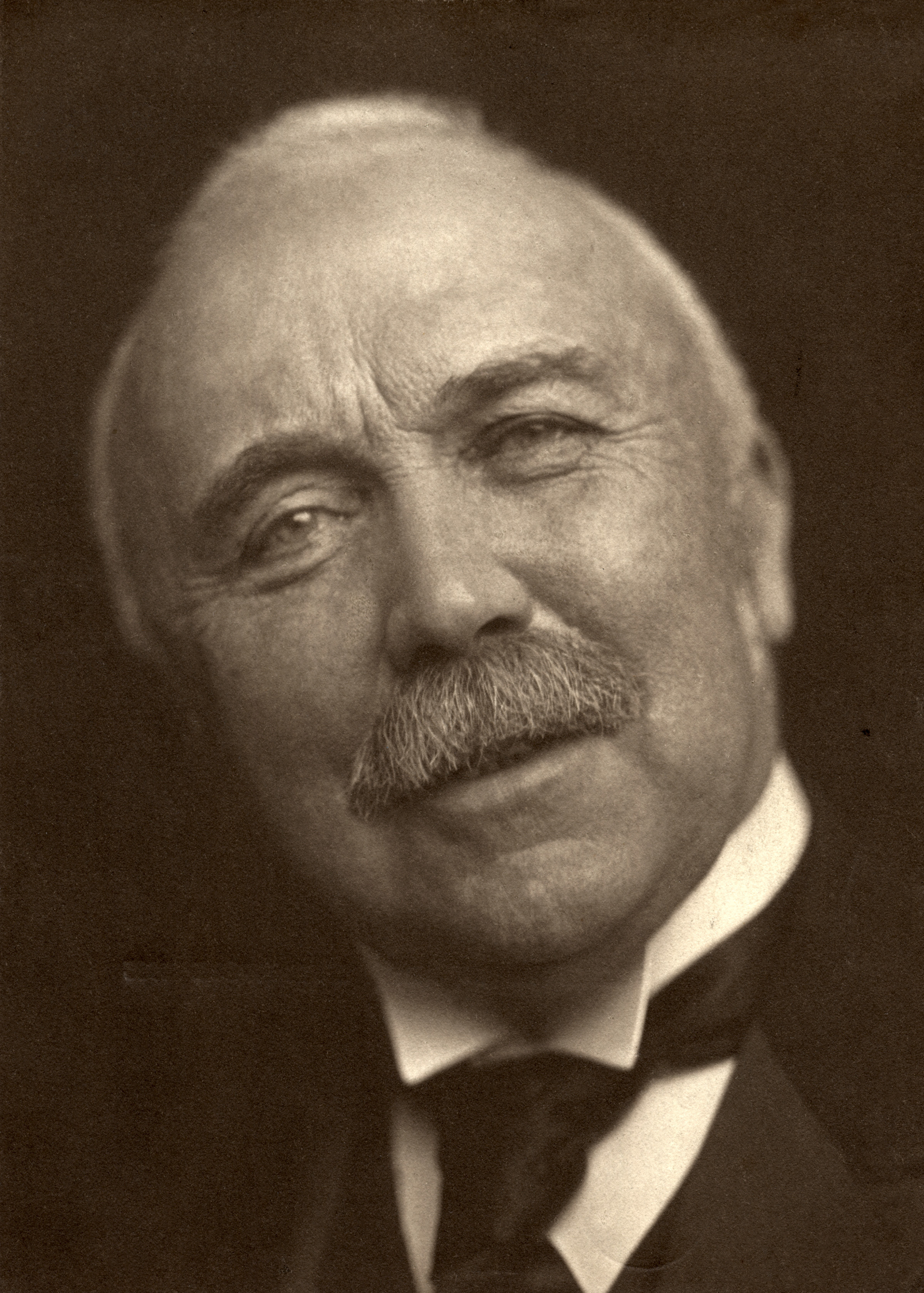

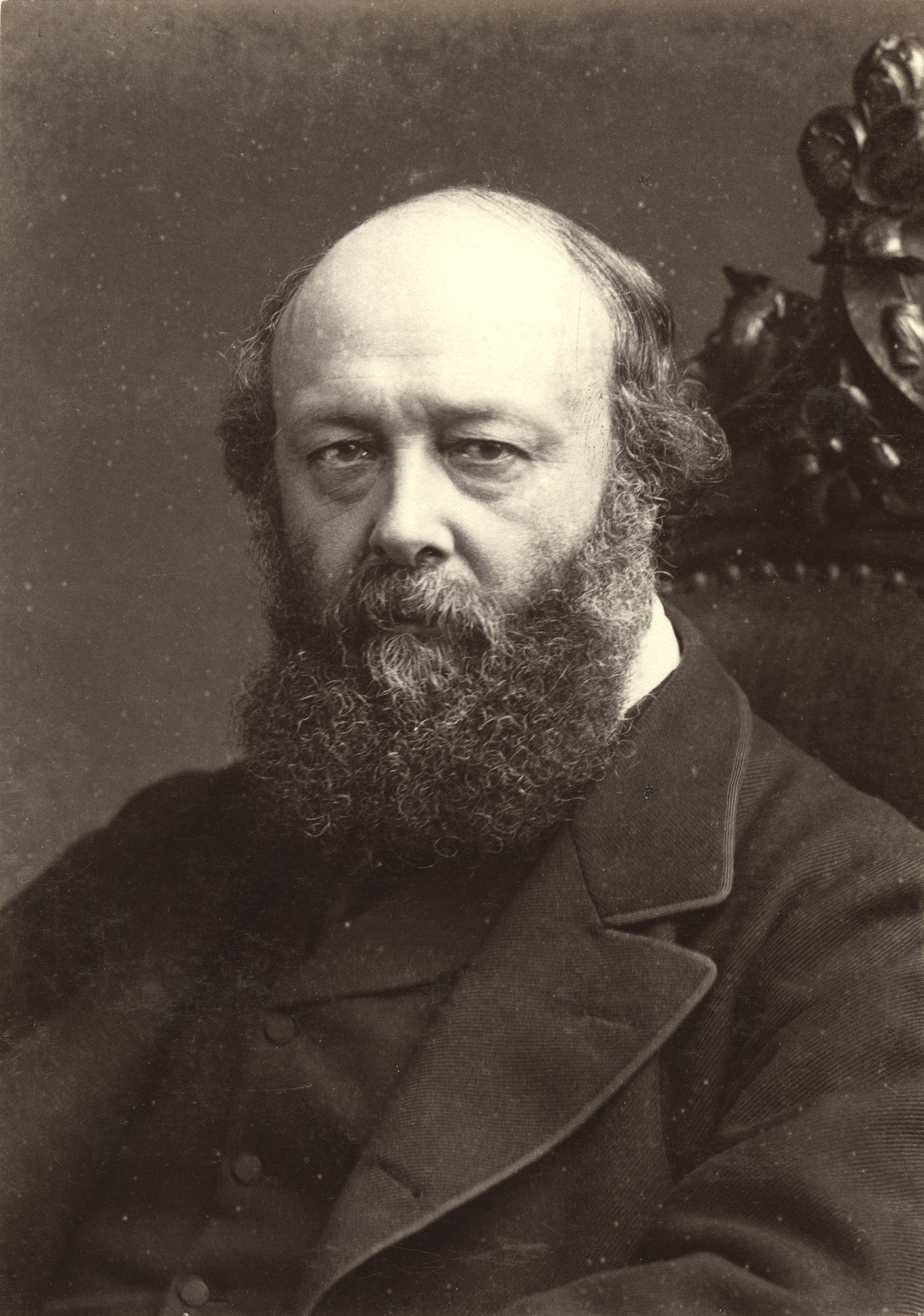

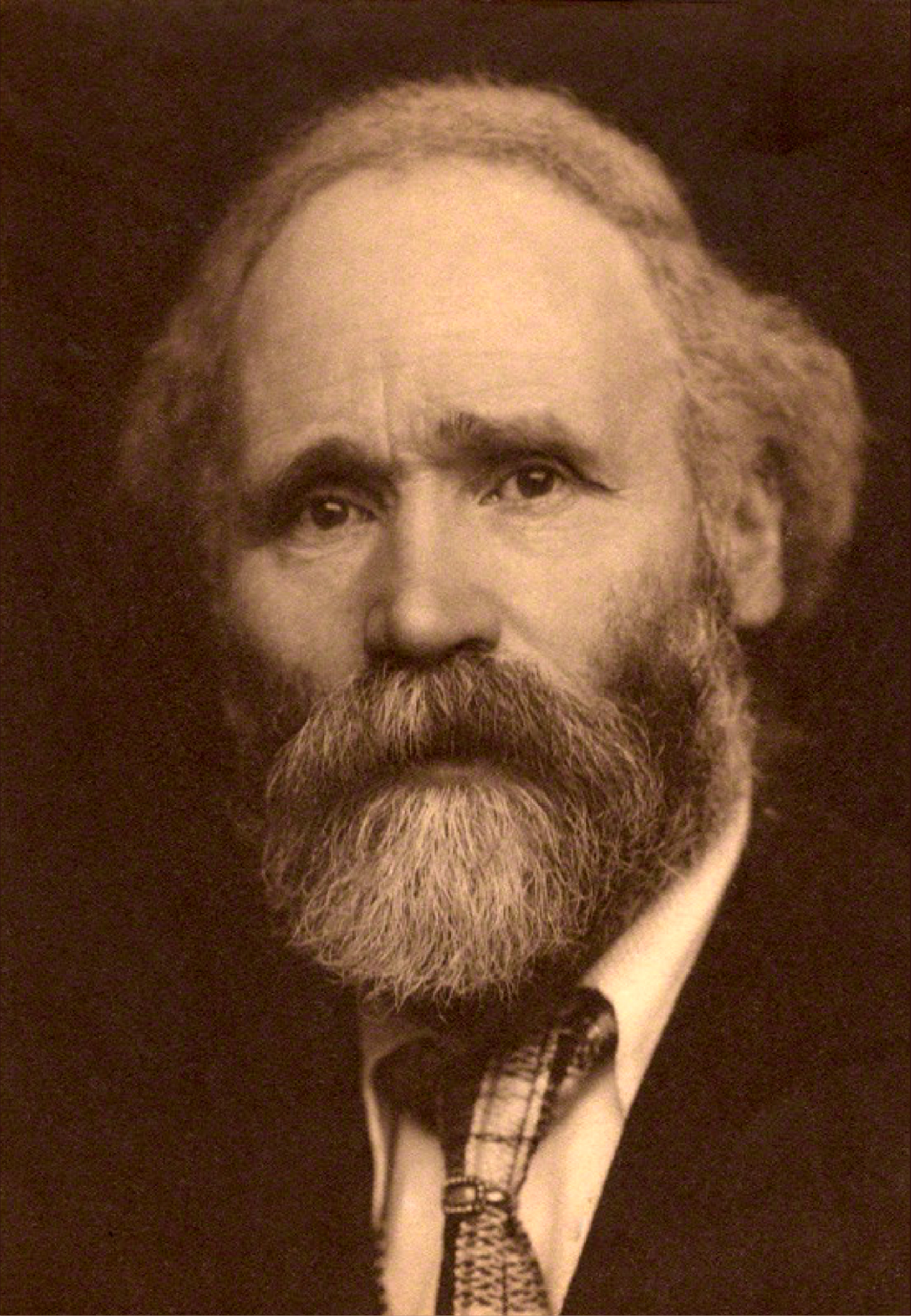

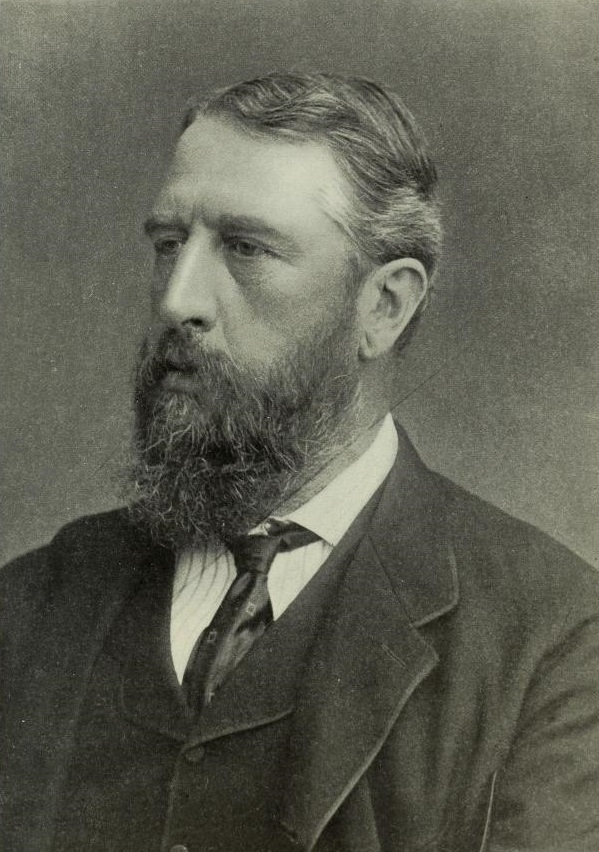
	First party	Second party
Leader	Henry Campbell-Bannerman	Marquess of Salisbury
Party	Liberal	Conservative
Alliance		Conservative-Liberal Unionist
Leader since	December 1898	April 1881
Leader's seat	Stirling Burghs	House of Lords
Last election	25 seats, 56.8%	8 seats, 40.0%
Seats won	27	6
Seat change	▲2	▼2
Popular vote	105,837	61,885
Percentage	58.5%	36.5%
Swing	▲1.7 pp	▼3.5 pp
	Third party	Fourth party
Leader	Keir Hardie	Duke of Devonshire
Party	Labour Repr. Cmte.	Liberal Unionist
Alliance		Conservative-Liberal Unionist
Leader since	28 February 1900	1886
Leader's seat	Ran in Merthyr Tydfil (won)	House of Lords
Last election	Did not contest	1 seat, 2.2%
Seats won	1	0
Seat change	▲1	▼1
Popular vote	9,598	2,047
Percentage	3.9%	1.1%
Swing	New party	▼1.1 pp

From 26 September to 24 October 1900, the 1900 United Kingdom general election was held in Wales, to elect all 670 members of the House of Commons, with 34 seats being in Wales. 34 seats represented territorial constituencies contested under the first past the post electoral system amongst 33 constituencies.

The elected was referred to as the "Khaki Election", as it was held at a time when it was widely believed that the Second Boer War had effectively been won, although would continue for another two years. The election was an attempt by the Conservative Party and its government allies, the Liberal Unionist Party, to regain the confidence of the electorate. It was also the final general election of the Victorian era, due to the death of Queen Victoria in 1901. It was the last one at which the leader of either of the two largest parties (and by extension, the incumbent Prime Minister) sat in the House of Lords rather than the House of Commons. It was also the last election during which the Marquess of Salisbury was leader of the Conservative Party, and indeed the last election he contested before his death in 1903.

The Labour Representation Committee contested its first general election, with its leader Keir Hardie entering Parliament in Wales. The committee would later become the Labour Party. More broadly, the Liberal Party made gains from the Conservatives and Liberal Unionist Party.

== Candidates ==
Below is a table summarising the candidates of the 1900 general election in Wales.

Affiliation	Candidates
Liberal Party	33 (Note: Includes Liberal-Labour candidates William Abraham in Rhondda, and Clement Edwards in Denbigh Boroughs.)
Conservative Party	20
Labour Representation Committee	2 (Note: The candidates that stood were Keir Hardie in Merthyr Tydfil and John Hodge in Gower.)
Liberal Unionist Party	1 (Note: Candidate John Jones Jenkins stood in Carmarthen Boroughs.)
Total	56

== Analysis ==
=== Liberal Party ===
The Liberal Party under new leader Henry Campbell-Bannerman saw an increase in vote share with a net gain of only 2 seats, which were gains from the Conservative Party and its ally, the Liberal Unionist Party. In Wales, the Liberals saw a increase in its seats from 25 seats to 27, as well as increase in vote share by roughly 1.7%.

The Liberal Party retained the seats of Anglesey, Arfon, Eifion, East Denbighshire, Flint Boroughs, Flintshire, Merioneth, Montgomeryshire, Breconshire, Cardiganshire, Carmarthen Boroughs, East Carmarthenshire, West Carmarthenshire, West Denbighshire, Pembrokeshire, Caernarfon, East Glamorganshire, Rhondda, Mid Glamorganshire, Swansea District, Gower, North Monmouthshire and West Monmouthshire. The party also held one of the two seats in the two-member constituency of Merthyr Tydfil. However, it also saw two losses, one to the Conservative Party and one to the new Labour Representation Committee. This was set-off with four gains from the Conservative Party and Liberal Unionists.

=== Conservatives and Liberal Unionists ===
Conservative Party saw a large swing against it primarily to the Liberal Party, with the Liberal Unionist Party also suffering a loss. Overall, the alliance between the two parties saw an decrease in vote share and seats, leaving only the Conservative Party with representation in Wales out of the two. Although the Conservative Party made one gain in Wales, the allies' overall losses of 4 seats saw it only holding 6 seats in total.

The Conservatives retained the seats of Montgomery, Denbigh Boroughs, South Glamorganshire, South Monmouthshire, Pembroke and Haverfordwest. The Conservatives also gained Monmouth Boroughs from the Liberal Party. However, it also lost Radnorshire, Cardiff and Swansea Town to the Liberal Party.

The Liberal Unionist Party suffered swing against it to the Liberal Party and by way of the party only having one standing in Wales. John Jones Jenkins in Carmarthen Boroughs, who had won the seat at the last election after having run several times before, lost the seat to the Liberal Party. As a result, the party was without representation in Wales, with the party (although standing candidates at subsequent elections), and would not hold any more seats before its official merge with the Conservative Party in 1912.

=== Labour Representation Committee ===
The newly formed Labour Representation Committee, which had emerged as a group to represent the working classes, stood candidates in England and Wales at this election. Primarily due to the very short existence of the party a few months before the election, it stood only 15 candidates nationally. In Wales, the group stood two candidates. These were founder and leader of the group, Keir Hardie, in Merthyr Tydfil and John Hodge in Gower. Hardie was successful in Merthyr Tydfil, winning one of the two seats in the constituency from the Liberal Party, and thus entering Parliament. Hodge, however, was unsuccessful against Liberal incumbent John Aeron Thomas, although achieved 47.4% of the vote. In all, the group gained one of its two seat first seats in Wales; the other winning candidate for the group, Richard Bell, won one of the two seats in Derby, England. The group would also contest the 1906 general election before emerging as the Labour Party following that election.

== Results ==
Party	Seats					Aggregate votes		
Party	Total	Gains	Losses	Net	Of total (%)	Total	Of total (%) (Note: Adjusted for multi-member constituencies.)	Change (%)
Liberal	27 (Note: Includes Liberal-Labour MP William Abraham in Rhondda.)	4	2	▲2	79.4	105,837	58.5	▲1.7
Conservative-Liberal Unionist	6	1	4	▼3	17.6	63,932	37.6	▼4.6
Conservative	6	1	3	▼2	17.6	61,885	36.5	▼3.5
Liberal Unionist	0	0	1	▼1	—	2,047	1.1	▼1.1
Labour Repr. Cmte.	1	New		▲1	2.9	9,598	3.9	New
Total	34			0	100.0	179,367	100.0	0.0
Registered voters, and turnout						225,738 (Note: Electorate in contested constituencies. The total electorate was 340,290.)	76.4	▼2.9

=== Popular vote ===
Popular vote
Liberal	58.5%
Conservative	36.5%
Labour R. C.	3.9%
Liberal Unionist	1.1%

Popular vote (alliances)
Liberal	56.8%
Con-LU	37.6%
Labour R. C.	3.9%

=== Parliament seats ===
Parliament seats
Liberal	79.4%
Conservative	17.6%
Labour R. C.	2.9%

Parliament seats (alliances)
Liberal	79.4%
Con-LU	17.6%
Labour R. C.	2.9%

== See also ==
- 1900 United Kingdom general election in England
- 1900 United Kingdom general election in Ireland
- 1900 United Kingdom general election in Scotland
- List of United Kingdom Parliament constituencies (1885–1918) by region
- List of MPs for constituencies in Wales (1900–1906)
