= List of MPs for constituencies in Wales (1900–1906) =

- 1900
- 1900 general election in England and Wales; Colours on map indicate the party allegiance of each constituency's MP.

This is a list of members of Parliament in Wales, elected to the House of Commons of the United Kingdom in the 1900 general election.

== Composition ==
Affiliation	Members
Liberal Party	26
Conservative Party	6
Liberal-Labour	1
Labour Representation Committee	1
Total	34

== MPs ==
MP	Constituency	Party	In constituency since	Ref.
William Abraham	Rhondda	Lib-Lab	1885	
Windham Wyndham-Quin	South Glamorganshire	Conservative	1895	
David Brynmor Jones	Swansea District	Liberal Party	1895	
Arthur Humphreys-Owen	Montgomeryshire	Liberal Party	1894 by-election	
John Bryn Roberts	Eifion	Liberal Party	1885	
George Thomas Kenyon	Denbigh Boroughs	Conservative Party	1900	
Frank Edwards	Radnorshire	Liberal Party	1900	
Ellis Ellis-Griffith	Anglesey	Liberal Party	1895	
Samuel Thomas Evans	Mid Glamorganshire	Liberal Party	1892	
Keir Hardie	Merthyr Tydfil	Labour Repr. Cmte.	1900	
Frederick Rutherfoord Harris	Monmouth Boroughs	Conservative Party	1900	
Frederick Courtenay Morgan	South Monmouthshire	Conservative Party	1906	
William Jones	Arfon	Liberal Party	1895	
Samuel Smith	Flintshire	Liberal Party	1886	
David Lloyd George	Caernarfon	Liberal Party	1890	
Reginald McKenna	North Monmouthshire	Liberal Party	1895	
John Lloyd Morgan	West Carmarthenshire	Liberal Party	1889 by-election	
Samuel Moss	East Denbighshire	Liberal Party	1897 by-election	
George Newnes	Swansea	Liberal Party	1900	
William Harcourt	West Monmouthshire	Liberal Party	1895	
John Roberts	West Denbighshire	Liberal Party	1892	
Charles Morley	Breconshire	Liberal Party	1895	
Walter Roch	Pembrokeshire	Liberal Party	1898 by-election	
Abel Thomas	East Carmarthenshire	Liberal Party	1890 by-election	
Alfred Thomas	East Glamorganshire	Liberal Party	1885	
D. A. Thomas	Merthyr Tydfil	Liberal Party	1892	
Matthew Vaughan-Davies	Cardiganshire	Liberal Party	1895	
Osmond Williams	Merioneth	Liberal Party	1900	
Alfred Davies	Carmarthen Boroughs	Liberal Party	1900	
John Aeron Thomas	Gower	Liberal Party	1900	

== By-elections ==
- 1901 Monmouth Boroughs by-election
- 1904 West Monmouthshire by-election

== See also ==
- List of MPs elected in the 1900 United Kingdom general election
- 1900 United Kingdom general election
- 1900 United Kingdom general election in Wales
