= 1900 United Kingdom general election in Ireland =

- 29 September – 12 October 1900

103 seats for Ireland of the 670 seats in the House of Commons
- Turnout: 60.9% (▼11.8 pp)
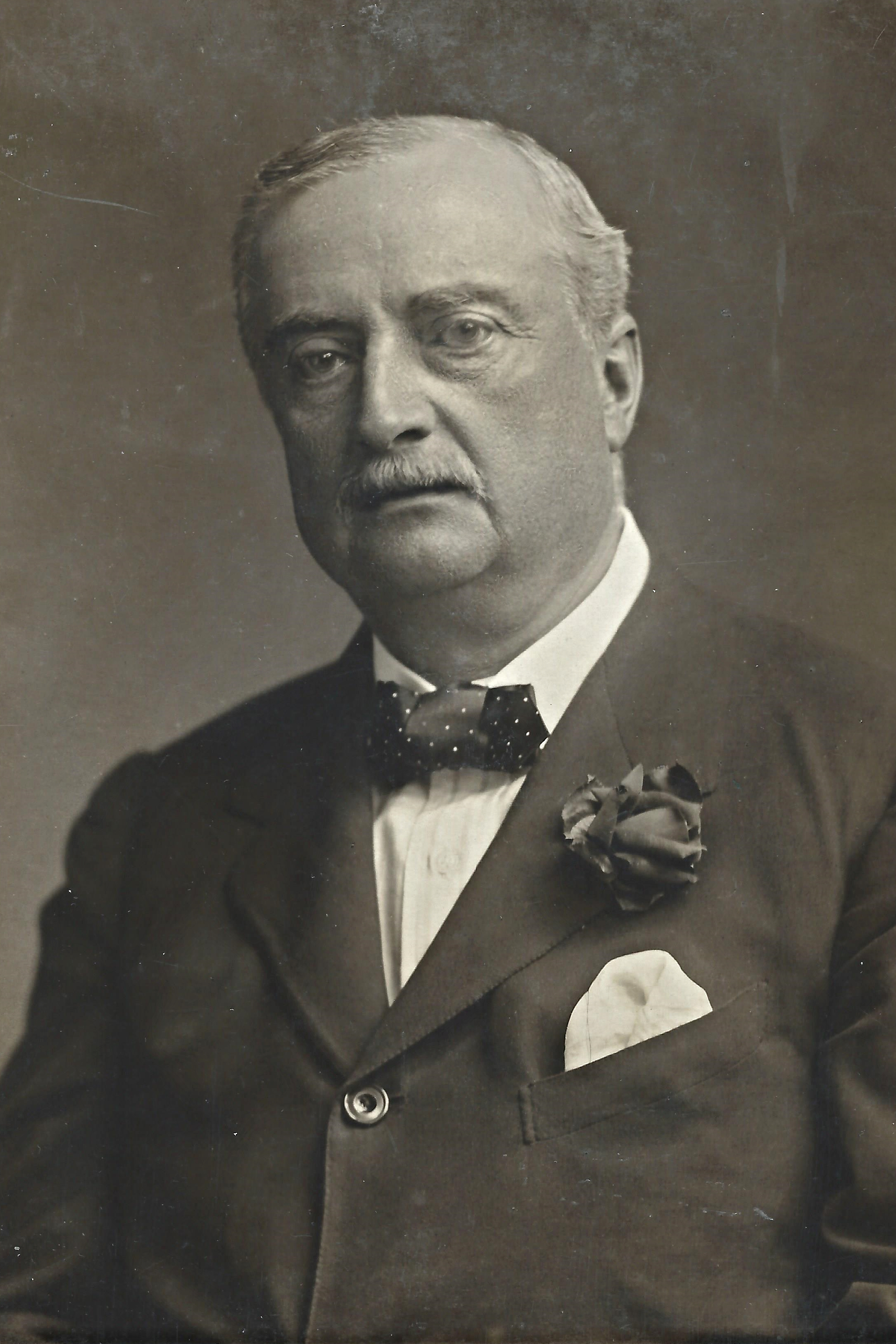

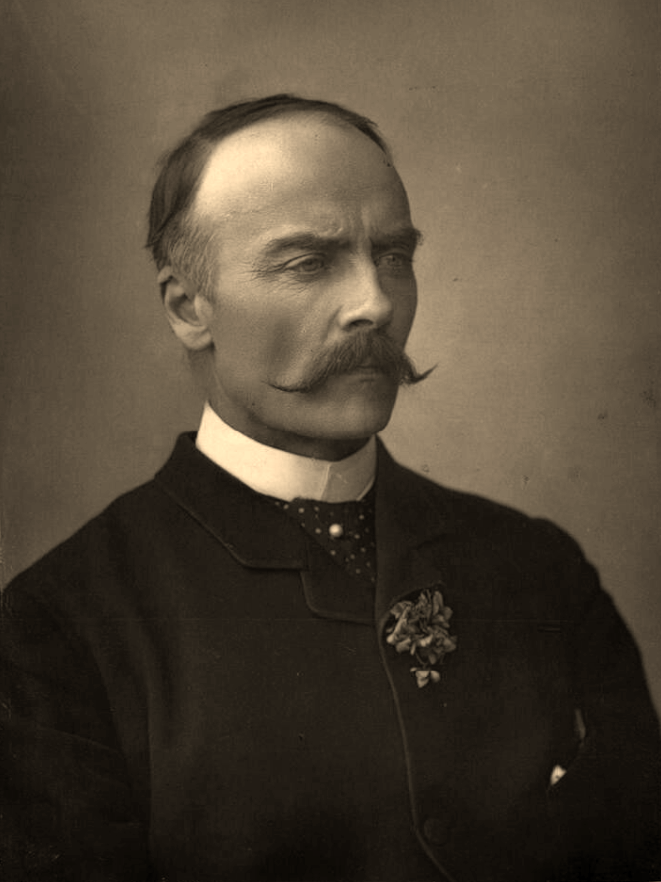

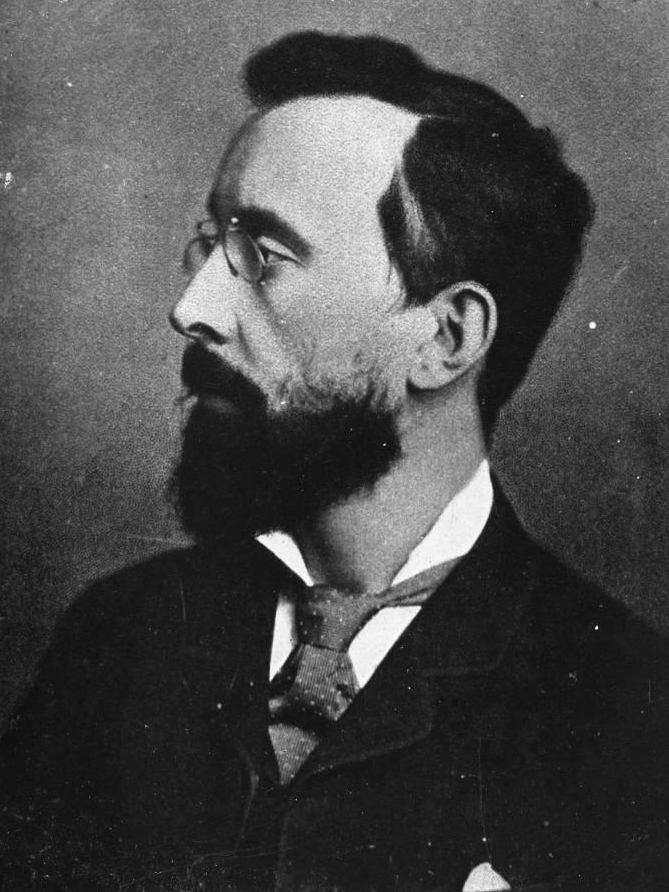

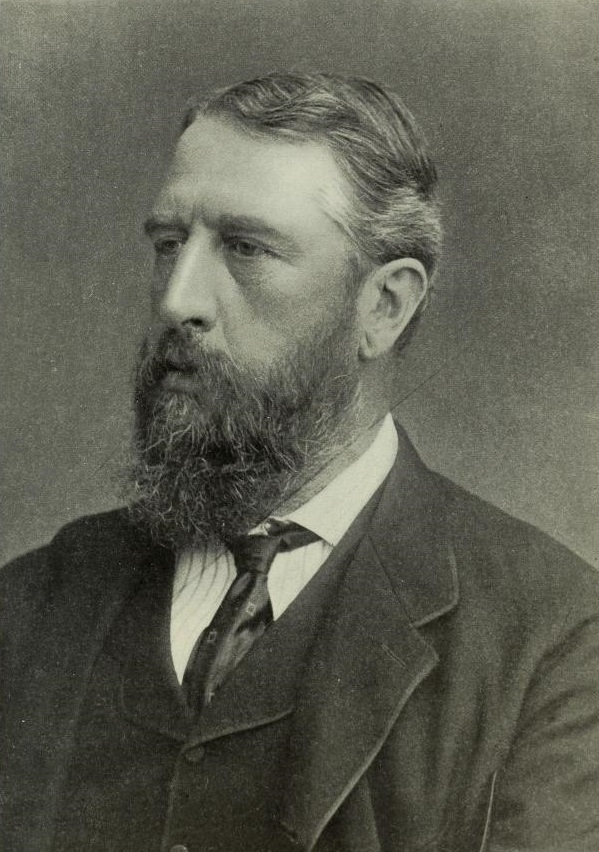

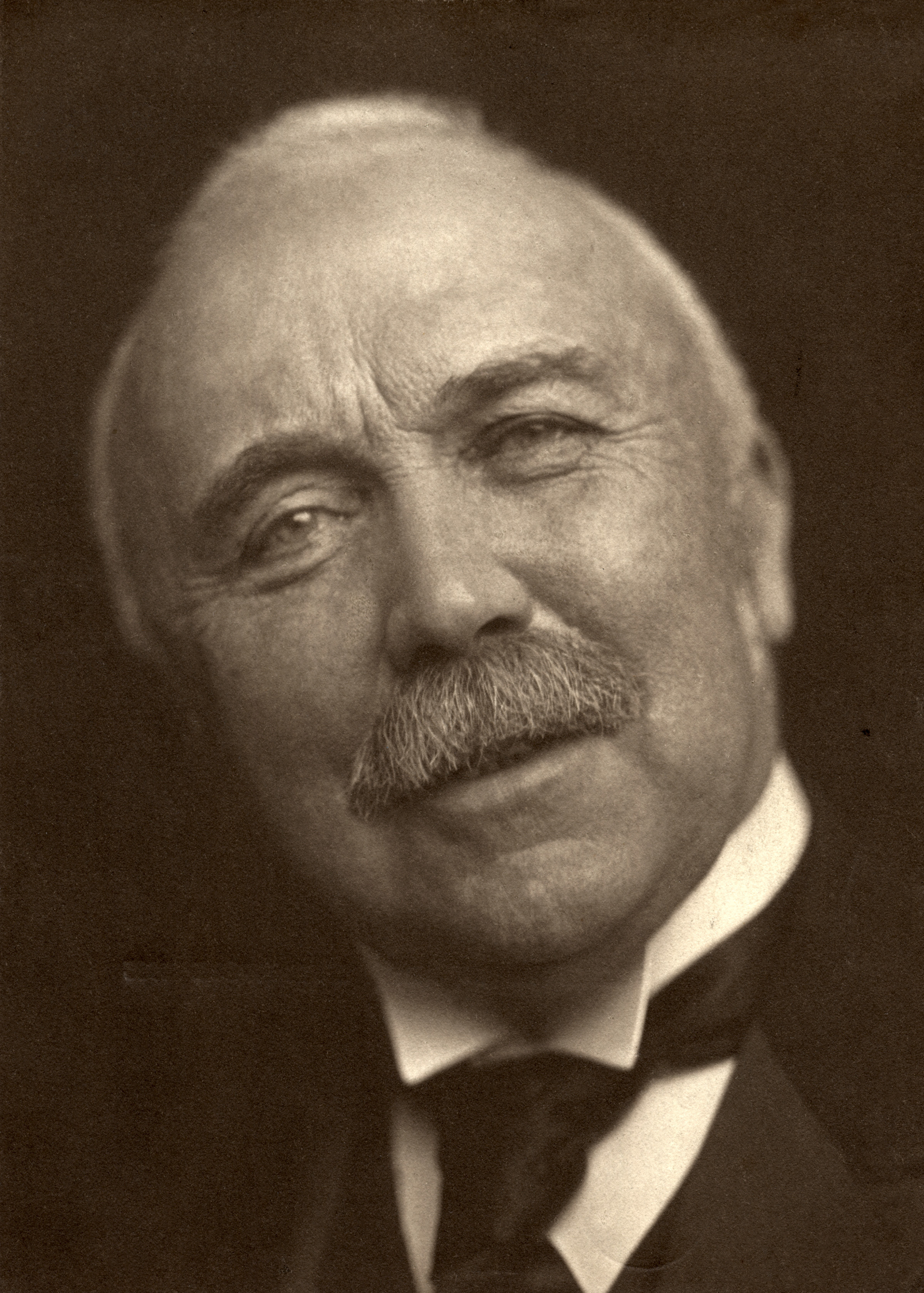
	First party	Second party	Third party
Leader	John Redmond	Edward James Saunderson	Tim Healy
Party	Irish Parliamentary	Irish Unionist	Healyite Nationalist
Alliance		Conservative-Liberal Unionist
Leader since	1900	1891	1895
Leader's seat	Waterford City	North Armagh	North Louth
Last election	81 seats, 66.9%	17 seats, 16.7%	Did not stand
Seats won	76	17	4
Seat change	▼5	Steady	▲4
Popular vote	63,195	43,115	22,174
Percentage	40.2%	30.5%	14.8%
Swing	▼26.7 pp	▲13.8 pp	New party
	Fourth party	Fifth party
Leader	Duke of Devonshire	Henry Campbell-Bannerman
Party	Liberal Unionist	Liberal
Alliance	Conservative-Liberal Unionist
Leader since	1886	December 1898
Leader's seat	House of Lords	Stirling Burghs
Last election	4 seats, 9.3%	1 seat, 4.3%
Seats won	4	1
Seat change	Steady	Steady
Popular vote	2,499	2,869
Percentage	1.7%	2.0%
Swing	▼7.6 pp	▼2.3 pp

From 29 September and 12 October 1900, the 1900 United Kingdom general election was held in Ireland. Of the 670 seats in the House of Commons, 103 were in Ireland; 101 represented 100 county and borough territorial constituencies, with 2 seats representing Cork City; and two additional seats represented the Dublin University wherein only graduates of the university could vote.

The elected was referred to as the "Khaki Election", as it was held at a time when it was widely believed that the Second Boer War had effectively been won, although would continue for another two years. The election was an attempt by the Conservative Party and its government allies, the Liberal Unionist Party, to regain the confidence of the electorate. It was also the final general election of the Victorian era, due to the death of Queen Victoria in 1901. It was the last one at which the leader of either of the two largest parties (and by extension, the incumbent Prime Minister) sat in the House of Lords rather than the House of Commons. It was also the last election during which the Marquess of Salisbury was leader of the Conservative Party, and indeed the last election he contested before his death in 1903.

This election was the first fought after the separate organisations in the Irish Parliamentary Party re-merged after a split in 1891 between the Irish National Federation, which had opposed the leadership of Charles Stewart Parnell, and the Irish National League, which had supported his continued leadership. The IPP was now led by John Redmond of the smaller INL.

In the overall election result, the coalition of the Conservative Party, which included the Irish Unionist Alliance, and the Liberal Unionist Party, was returned and the Marquess of Salisbury continued as Prime Minister.

== Candidates ==
Below is a table summarising the candidates of the 1900 general election in Ireland, excluding those who stood in the University constituency of Dublin University.

Affiliation	Candidates
Irish Parliamentary Party	82
Irish Unionist Party	25
Healyite Nationalist	16
Independent Unionist	5
Liberal Unionist Party	3 (Note: The candidates stood in Belfast West, South Londonderry and South Tyrone.)
Independent Nationalist	2
Liberal Party	1 (Note: Candidate Charles Hemphill stood in North Tyrone.)
Independent Liberal Unionist	1
Total	135

== County and borough results ==
Party	Leader	Seats					Aggregate votes		
Party	Leader	Total	Gains	Losses	Net	Of total (%)	Total	Of total (%) (Note: Adjusted for multi-member constituencies.)	Change (%)
Irish Parliamentary	John; Redmond	76	2	7	▼5	75.2	63,195	40.2	▼26.7
Irish; Unionist	Edward James Saunderson	16	2	1 (Note: South Dublin.)	▲1	15.8	43,115	30.5	▲13.8
Healyite Nationalist	Tim; Healy	4	New		▲4	4.0	22,174	14.8	New
Independent; Unionist	—N/a	0	New			—	10,044	6.7	New
Independent; Nationalist	—N/a	1	1 (Note: South Louth.)	0	▲1	1.0	3,642	2.4	▲0.8
Liberal	Henry Campbell-Bannerman	1	0	0	Steady	1.0	2,869	2.0	▼2.3
Liberal Unionist	Duke of Devonshire	3	0	1 (Note: Dublin St Stephen's Green.)	▼1	3.0	2,499	1.7	▼7.6
Independent Liberal Unionist	—N/a	0	New			—	1,855	1.2	New
Total		101			0	100.0	149,393	100.0	0.0
Registered voters, and turnout							233,110 (Note: Electorate in contested constituencies. The total electorate was 757.849.)	60.9	▼11.8

=== Popular vote ===
Parliamentary seats
IPP	40.2%
Irish Unionist	30.5%
Healyite Nat.	14.8%
Ind. Unionist	6.7%
Ind. Nationalist	2.4%
Liberal	2.0%
Liberal Unionist	1.7%
Ind. LU	1.2%

Parliamentary seats (alliances)
IPP	40.2%
Con-LU	32.2%
Healyite Nat.	14.8%
Ind. Unionist	6.7%
Ind. Nationalist	2.4%
Liberal	2.0%
Ind. LU	1.2%

=== Parliament seats ===
Parliamentary seats
IPP	75.2%
Irish Unionist	15.8%
Healyite Nat.	4.0%
Liberal Unionist	3.0%
Liberal	1.0%
Ind. Nationalist	1.0%

Parliamentary seats (alliances)
IPP	75.2%
Con-LU	18.8%
Healyite Nat.	4.0%
Liberal	1.0%
Ind. Nationalist	1.0%

== Dublin University constituency result ==
1900 general election: Dublin University (2 seats)
Party	Candidate	Votes	%	±%
Irish Unionist	Edward Carson	Unopposed		
Liberal Unionist	W. E. H. Lecky	Unopposed		
Irish Unionist hold				
Liberal Unionist gain from Irish Unionist				

== See also ==
- 1900 United Kingdom general election in England
- 1900 United Kingdom general election in Scotland
- 1900 United Kingdom general election in Wales
- List of United Kingdom Parliament constituencies (1885–1918) by region
- History of Ireland (1801–1923)
