= 1900 United Kingdom general election in England =

- 26 Sept. – 24 Oct. 1900

All 461 English seats to the House of Commons
- Turnout: 76.0% (▼3.2 pp)
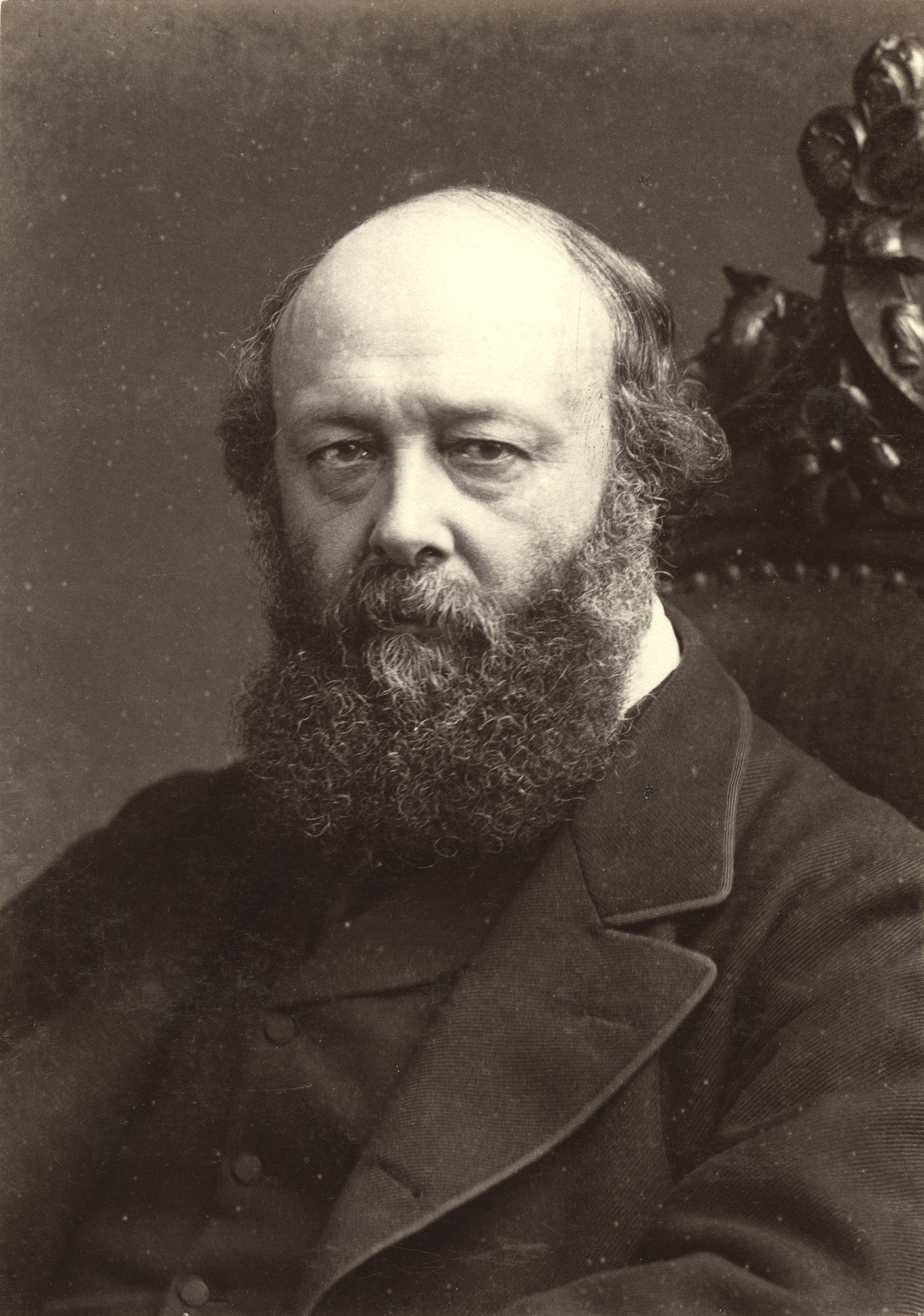

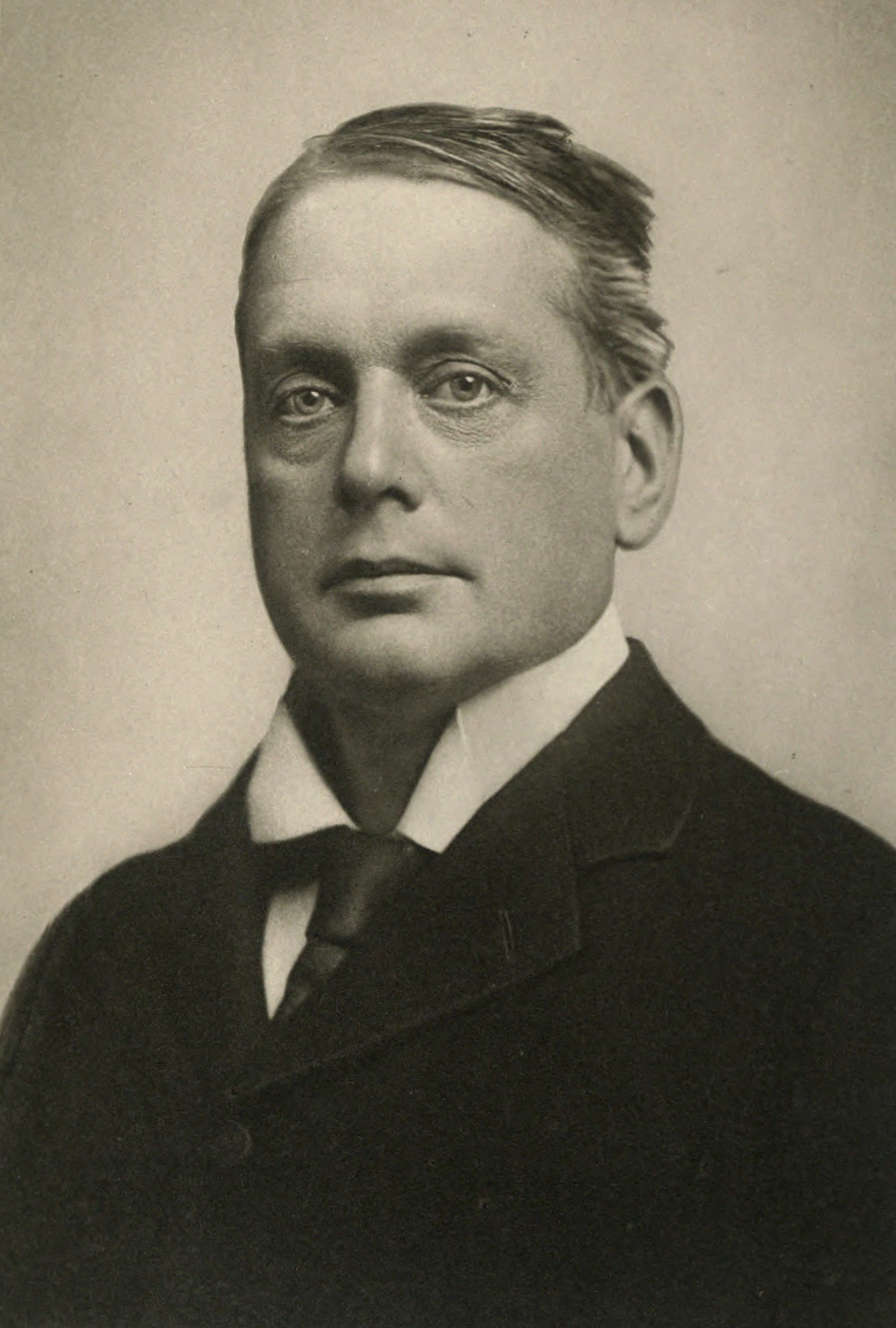

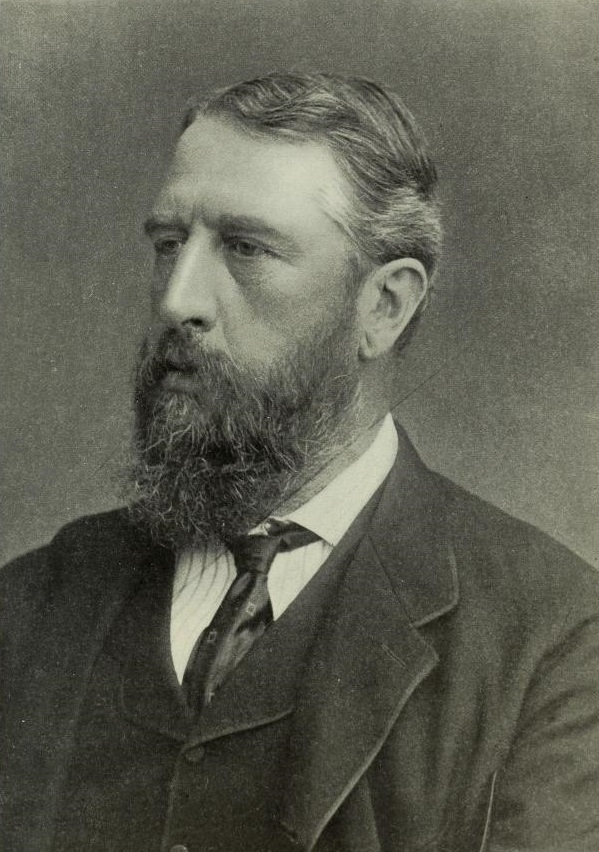

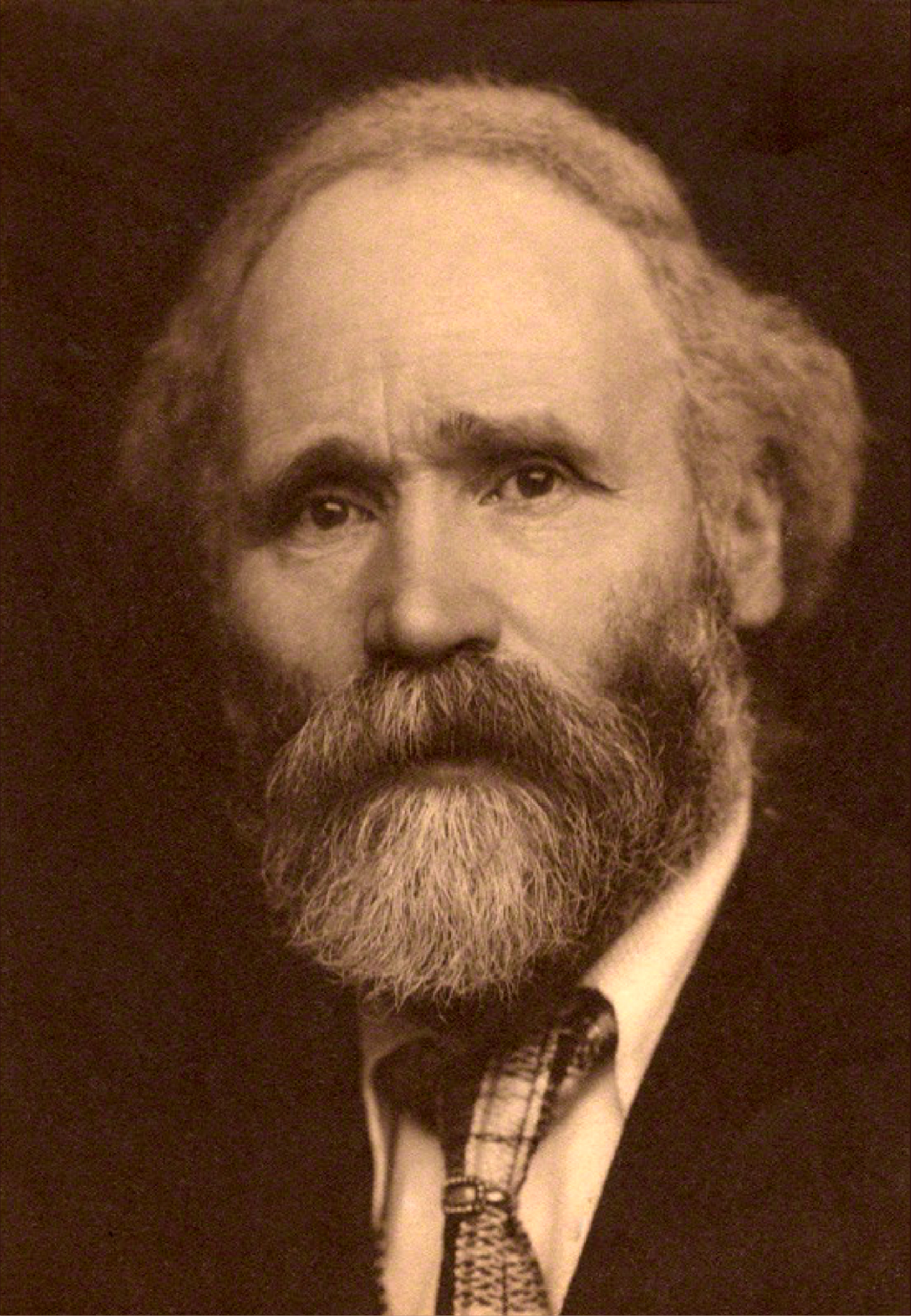
	First party	Second party
Leader	Marquess of Salisbury	Earl of Rosebery
Party	Conservative	Liberal
Alliance	Conservative-Liberal Unionist
Leader since	April 1881	5 March 1894
Leader's seat	House of Lords	House of Lords
Last election	296 seats, (Note: Combined results for borough, county and university seats) 43.8%	112 seats, 46.7%
Seats won	291	121 (Note: Figure includes Speaker of the House of Commons William Court Gully in Carlisle.)
Seat change	▼5	▲9
Popular vote	1,242,243 (Note: Total and percentage votes given here are for territorial constituencies only)	1,218,525
Percentage	45.8%	45.6%
Swing	▲2.0 pp	▼1.1 pp
	Third party	Fourth party
Leader	Duke of Devonshire	Keir Hardie
Party	Liberal Unionist	Labour Repr. Cmte.
Alliance	Conservative-Liberal Unionist
Leader since	1886	28 February 1900
Leader's seat	House of Lords	Ran in Merthyr Tydfil (won)
Last election	52 seats, 8.1%	Did not contest
Seats won	46	1
Seat change	▼6	▲1
Popular vote	178,952	53,100
Percentage	6.6%	1.4%
Swing	▼1.5 pp	New party

From 26 September to 24 October 1900, the 1900 United Kingdom general election was held in England, to elect all 670 members of the House of Commons, with 461 seats being in England. 456 seats represented territorial constituencies contested under the first past the post electoral system, and several multi-member constituencies under the block voting system; and 5 additional seats represented the 3 university constituencies which returned members under different voting systems.

The elected was referred to as the "Khaki Election", as it was held at a time when it was widely believed that the Second Boer War had effectively been won, although would continue for another two years. The election was an attempt by the Conservative Party and its government allies, the Liberal Unionist Party, to regain the confidence of the electorate. It was also the final general election of the Victorian era, due to the death of Queen Victoria in 1901. It was the last one at which the leader of either of the two largest parties (and by extension, the incumbent Prime Minister) sat in the House of Lords rather than the House of Commons. It was also the last election during which the Marquess of Salisbury was leader of the Conservative Party, and indeed the last election he contested before his death in 1903.

The Labour Representation Committee contested its first general election, with its first English MP Richard Bell entering Parliament. The committee would later become the Labour Party. More broadly, the Liberal Party made gains from the Conservatives and Liberal Unionist Party.

== Candidates ==
Below is a table summarising the candidates of the 1900 general election in England, excluding those in the university constituencies.

Affiliation	Candidates
Conservative Party	378
Liberal Party	302
Liberal Unionist Party	63
Labour Representation Committee	13
Independent Protestant	2 (Note: The candidates that stood were Benjamin Nicholson in Ashford and John Kensit in Brighton.)
Nationalist Party	1 (Note: Candidate T. P. O'Connor stood in Liverpool Scotland.)
Independent Liberal	1 (Note: Candidate Sir John Austin stood in Osgoldcross.)
Independent Conservative	1
Independent Labour	1
Independent	1
Total	763

== Analysis ==
=== Liberal Party ===
The Liberal Party maintained 45.6% of the vote share, with a minor drop of 1.1% when compared to the previous election. The Liberals, much like with the reset of the partes in England, saw very little in terms of change of the number of seats, despite several exchanges taking place: it lost 17 seats to the Conservative Party, but gained 24 from the Conservatives; its lost 6 seats to the Liberal Unionists, but gained 9 seats from the latter. In addition, in the seat of Osgoldcross, the incumbent MP Sir John Austin had since left the Liberal Party and voluntarily brought about the 1899 Osgoldcross by-election, which he won as an Independent Liberal. He stood again at this election under this label and retained the seat personally, however it represented a gain from the Liberal Party. Overall, the party decreased its number of seats to 9 at this election.

Within the Liberal party stood several Liberal-Labour sponsored candidates, with several holding seats in England. Such MPs won or held Battersea, Haggerston, one of the two seats in Leicester, Mid Durham, Morpeth, Wansbeck and Normanton. Overall, the Liberal Party It took 121 seats in total, within which 7 were Liberal-Labour MPs.

=== Conservative Party ===
The Conservative Party saw a slight increase in vote share of around 2.0%, but with a small decrease in seats across England, part of the wider only 0.5% increase vote share between itself and its allies, the Liberal Unionist Party. The Conservatives did retain 3 of its seats in the English university constituencies. It gained Bethnal Green South West, Hoxton, Hanley, Gainsborough, Cockermouth, Eskdale, Burnley, Stockton-on-Tees, Middlesbrough, Leeds East, Sheffield Brightside from the Liberal Party. The party also gained one of the two seats in the two-member seat of Plymouth from the Liberals, with the party already holding the other, as well as one of the two seats in Leicester, Sunderland and York. Additionally, it took both of the two seats in Portsmouth.

In exchange with the Liberal Unionists, it won Lambeth North, Marylebone West, Stoke-upon-Trent, Birmingham Edgbaston with the Liberal Unionists not standing against the Conservatives in the seat due to the parties' alliance. It may have also gained Heywood from the Liberal Unionists, with the MP switching to standing for the party at this election. However, it lost Halifax to the Liberal Unionists. It lost one of its university constituency seats in Oxford University to the Liberal Unionists.

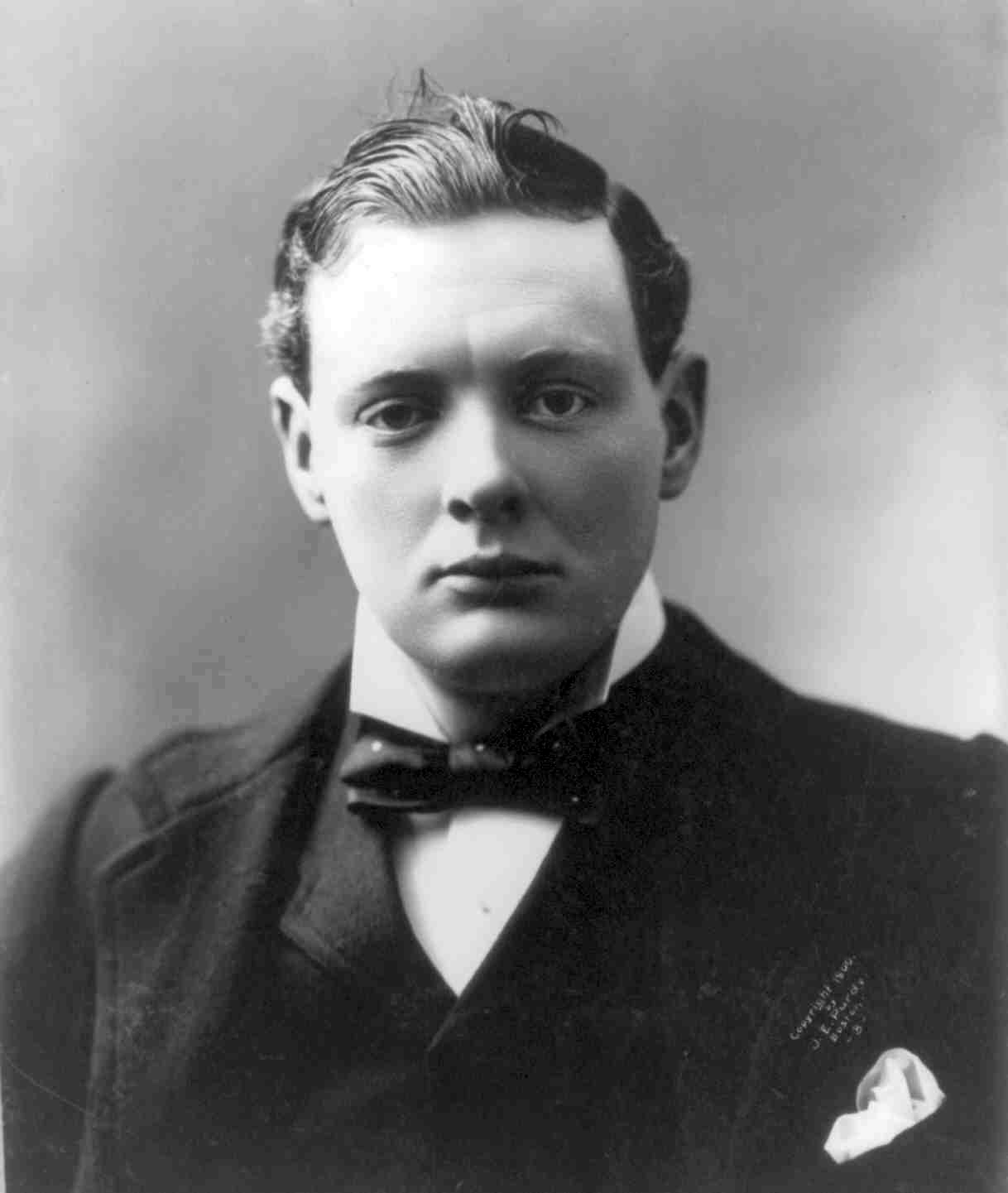
Winston Churchill

The Conservatives lost the single-member county and borough constituencies of Torquay, Frome, Stroud, Westbury, Reading, Hastings, Maidstone, Camberwell North, Haggerston, Wisbech, Walsall, Rugby, High Peak, Grantham, Mid Northamptonshire, Appleby, Lancaster, Radcliffe-cum-Farnworth, Crewe and Otley to the Liberal Party. It also lost both of its seats in Derby, with one going to the Liberals and another to the newly formed Labour Representation Committee. It lost its one seat in the multi-member seats of Northampton, Oldham and Stockport to the Liberals.

Notably, Conservative candidate Winston Churchill stood and won in Oldham, after having unsuccessfully stood in the seat in the 1899 Oldham by-election. His taking of the seat represented a gain from the Liberal Party, which he would go on to later join before the next election. Nevertheless, Churchill entered Parliament at this election as a Conservative MP.

With 22 gains and 27 losses, the party took an overall 288 seats in the county and borough constituencies, with 3 in the university constituencies, at a total seat count of 296 seats.

=== Liberal Unionist Party ===
The Liberal Unionist Party, led by the Duke of Devonshire (and Joseph Chamberlain in the House of Commons), saw a 1.5% decrease in vote to 6.6% of the vote, but with a drop of 6 seats. The party retained Bodmin, St Ives, Truro, Totnes, East Somerset, Bristol North, Aylesbury, St Pancras South, Biggleswade, Sudbury, Ludlow, Wellington (Shropshire), Handsworth, West Staffordshire, Ross, Droitwich, North Worcestershire, East Worcestershire, Warwick and Leamington, West Derbyshire, Lincoln, Peterborough, Liverpool Exchange, North Lonsdale, Manchester South, Darlington, South East Durham, Bradford Central, Shipley and Wakefield.

It retained one of the two seats in both Bath and Southampton, as well as its university constituency seat in London University. It also held its metropolitan Birmingham seats of Birmingham Bordesley, Birmingham Central, Birmingham North, Birmingham South and Birmingham West. It gained Tavistock, Burton, Newcastle-under-Lyme, Great Grimsby, Durham, Tyneside from the Liberal Party. It also gained one of the two seats in Halifax from the Conservative Party, as well as one of the two seats in Oxford University

However, internally in the alliance with the Conservatives, the Liberal Unionists lost Lambeth North, Marylebone West, Stoke-upon-Trent and Birmingham Edgbaston to the Conservatives. It also lost Camborne, Barnstaple, Gloucester, Cricklade, South Norfolk, Wolverhampton South, Spalding, The Hartlepools and Skipton to the Liberal Party. Of some uncertainty is the candidacy of George Kemp in the constituency of Heywood. Kemp had been elected to the House of Commons as a Liberal Unionist in the 1895 general election. However, he had crossed the floor between elections, and had his allegiances between the Conservative Party, the Liberal Unionist Party and Liberal Party were uncertain, particularly as he would be elected as a Liberal in the January 1910 general election. As such, revised political listings consider labelling him as a Conservative rather than a Liberal Unionist, as he may have been instead tentatively elected as a Conservative. The Liberal Unionists therefore may have lost the seat of Heywood in this election.

As such, the Liberal Unionists lost 14 seats but gained 8, taking a total of 46 seats in England at this election. When combined with the results of the Conservatives' 291 seats, the alliance between the Liberal Unionists and Conservatives held 337 English seats (with 5 being university constituency seats), and held a combined 52.4% majority vote share.

=== Labour Representation Committee ===
This was the first election in which the Labour Representation Committee –– a precursor committee that would go on to become the Labour Party –– stood at an election. The party only stood 13 candidates in England, though stood 15 nationally with the other 2 candidates, including Leader Keir Hardie in Wales. Hardie won his seat.

In England, the party only took 1.4% of the vote, with the party gaining its first MP, Richard Bell, in one of the two seats in Derby. Bell, however, would fall out with the party after the election, and instead stand in defection as Liberal-Labour candidate in support of the Liberal Party in the next election.

== Seats summary ==
Below is a table summarising the total number of seats, gains and losses for each party in both the territorial county and borough constituencies and the university constituencies.

Party	Seats				
Party	Total	Gains	Losses	Net	Of all (%)
Conservative-Liberal Unionist	337	30	41	▼11	73.1
Conservative	292	22	27	▼5	63.3
Liberal Unionist	45	8	14	▼6	9.8
Liberal	121 (Note: Includes 7 Liberal-Labour MPs.)	33	24	▲9	26.2
Labour Repr. Cmte.	1	New		▲1	0.2
Independent Liberal	1	1	0	▲1	0.2
Irish Nationalist	1	0	0	Steady	0.2
Total	461				

== County and borough results ==
Below is a table summarising the constituency results of the 1900 general election in England, excluding the result in the university constituencies.

Party	Seats					Aggregate votes		
Party	Total	Gains	Losses	Net	Of total (%)	Total	Of total (%) (Note: Adjusted for multi-member constituencies.)	Change (%)
Conservative-Liberal Unionist	332	29	40	▼11	72.8	1,421,195	52.4	▲0.5
Conservative	288	22	26	▼4	63.2	1,242,243	45.8	▲2.0
Liberal Unionist	44	7	14	▼7	9.6	178,952	6.6	▼1.5
Liberal	121 (Note: Includes 7 Liberal-Labour MPs.)	33	24	▲9	26.5	1,218,525	45.6	▼1.1
Labour Repr. Cmte.	1	New		▲1	0.2	53,100	1.4	New
Independent Protestant	0	New			—	7,036	0.3	New
Independent Liberal	1 (Note: Sir John Austin in Osgoldcross.)	1	0	▲1	0.2	5,609	0.2	▲0.1
Irish Nationalist	1 (Note: T. P. O'Connor in Liverpool Scotland.)	0	0	Steady	0.2	2,044	0.1	Steady
Ind. Conservative	0	Did not stand in 1895			—	439	0.0	—N/a
Independent Labour	0	0	0	Steady	—	433	0.0	▼0.6
Independent	0	0	0	Steady	—	111	0.0	Steady
Total	456			0	100.0	2,708,492	100.0	0.0
Registered voters, and turnout						3,281,948 (Note: Electorate in contested constituencies. The total electorate was 4,929,485.)	76.0	▼3.2

=== Popular vote ===
Popular vote
Conservative	45.8%
Liberal	45.6%
Liberal Unionist	6.6%
Labour R. C.	1.4%
Irish Nationalist	0.1%
Others	0.5%

Popular vote (alliances)
Con-LU	52.4%
Liberal	45.6%
Labour R. C.	1.4%
Irish Nationalist	0.1%
Others	0.5%

=== Parliament seats ===
Parliament seats
Conservative	63.2%
Liberal	26.5%
Liberal Unionist	9.6%
Labour R. C.	0.2%
Ind. Liberal	0.2%
Irish Nationalist	0.2%

Parliament seats (alliances)
Con-LU	72.8%
Liberal	26.5%
Labour R. C.	0.2%
Ind. Liberal	0.2%
Irish Nationalist	0.2%

== University constituency results ==
=== University results summary ===
Below is a table summarising the seats and vote share of the English university constituencies in the 1900 general election.

Party	Seats				Aggregate votes	
Party	Total	Gains	Losses	Net	Total	Of all (%)
Conservative-Liberal Unionist	5	1	1	Steady	0	0.0
Conservative	3	0	1	▼1	0	0.0
Liberal Unionist	2	1	0	▲1	0	0.0
Total	5				0	

=== Cambridge University ===
The constituency for Cambridge University returned two Members of Parliament using the Plurality block voting electoral system. The electorate consisted of graduates of the university.

General election 1900: Cambridge University (2 seats)
Party	Candidate	Votes	%	±%
Conservative	Sir John Eldon Gorst	Unopposed		
Conservative	Richard Claverhouse Jebb	Unopposed		
Conservative hold				
Conservative hold				

=== London University ===
The constituency for London University returned one Member of Parliament using the First-past-the-post electoral system. The electorate consisted of graduates of the university.

General election 1900: London University
Party	Candidate	Votes	%	±%
Liberal Unionist	Michael Foster	Unopposed		
Liberal Unionist hold				

=== Oxford University ===
The constituency for Oxford University returned two Members of Parliament using the Plurality block voting electoral system. The electorate consisted of graduates of the university.

General election 1 October 1900: Oxford University (2 seats)
Party	Candidate	Votes	%	±%
Conservative	John Gilbert Talbot	Unopposed		
Liberal Unionist	Sir William Anson	Unopposed		
Conservative hold				
Liberal Unionist gain from Conservative				

== See also ==
- 1900 United Kingdom general election in Ireland
- 1900 United Kingdom general election in Scotland
- 1900 United Kingdom general election in Wales
- List of United Kingdom Parliament constituencies (1885–1918) by region
