= 1900 United Kingdom general election =

Election

- 26 September – 24 October 1900

All 670 seats in the House of Commons 336 seats needed for a majority
- Turnout: 3,260,696; 75.1% (▼3.3 pp)
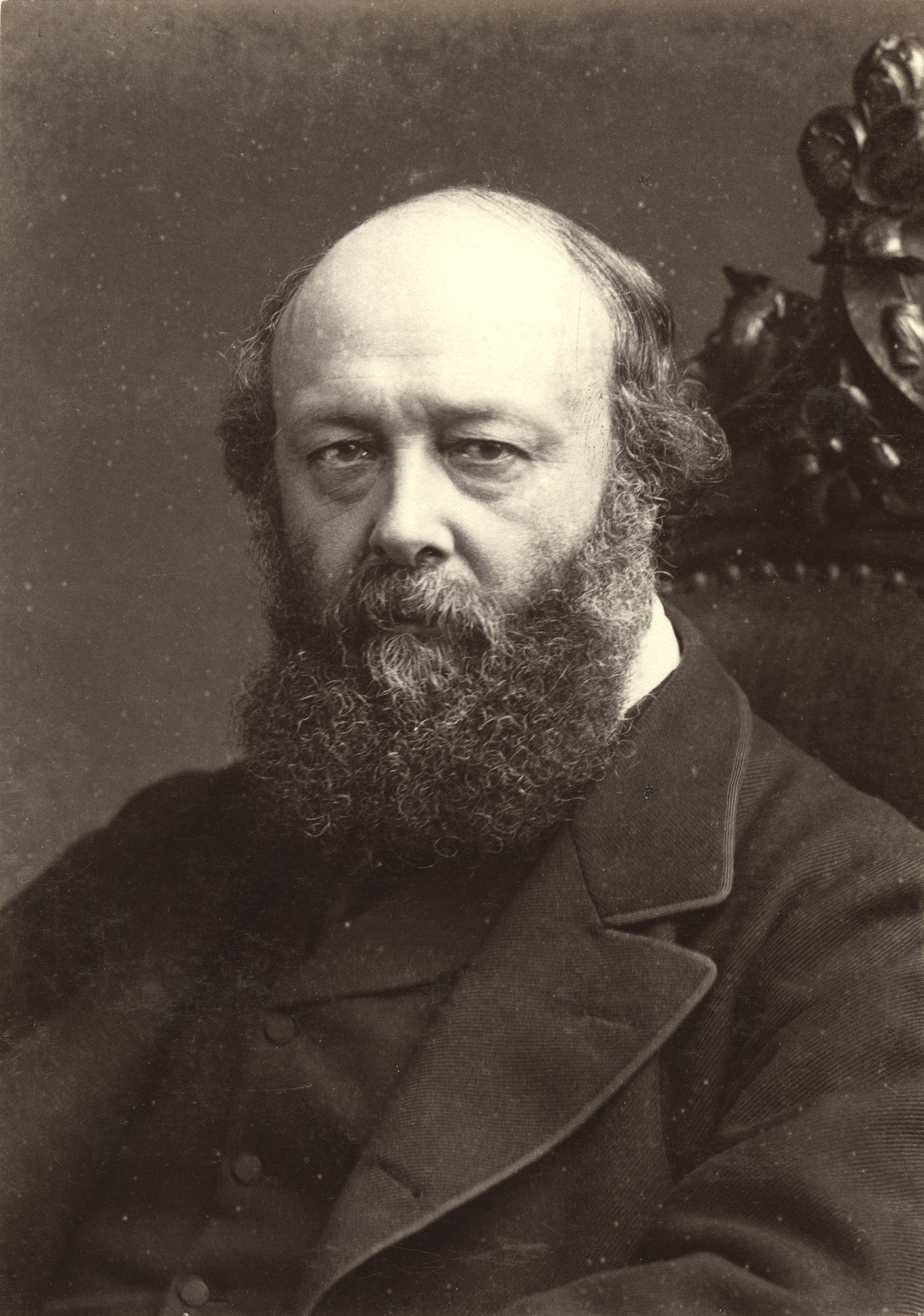

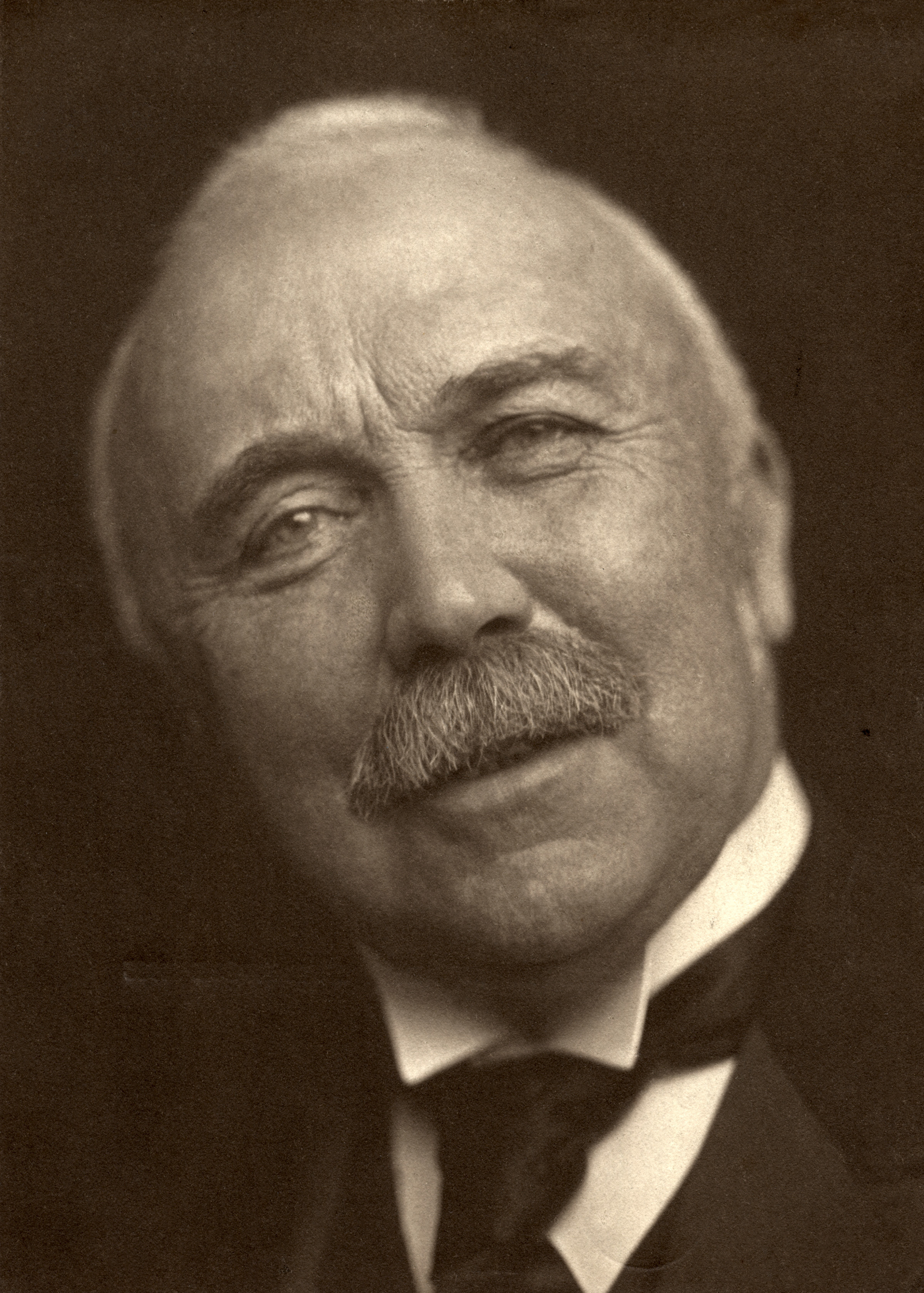

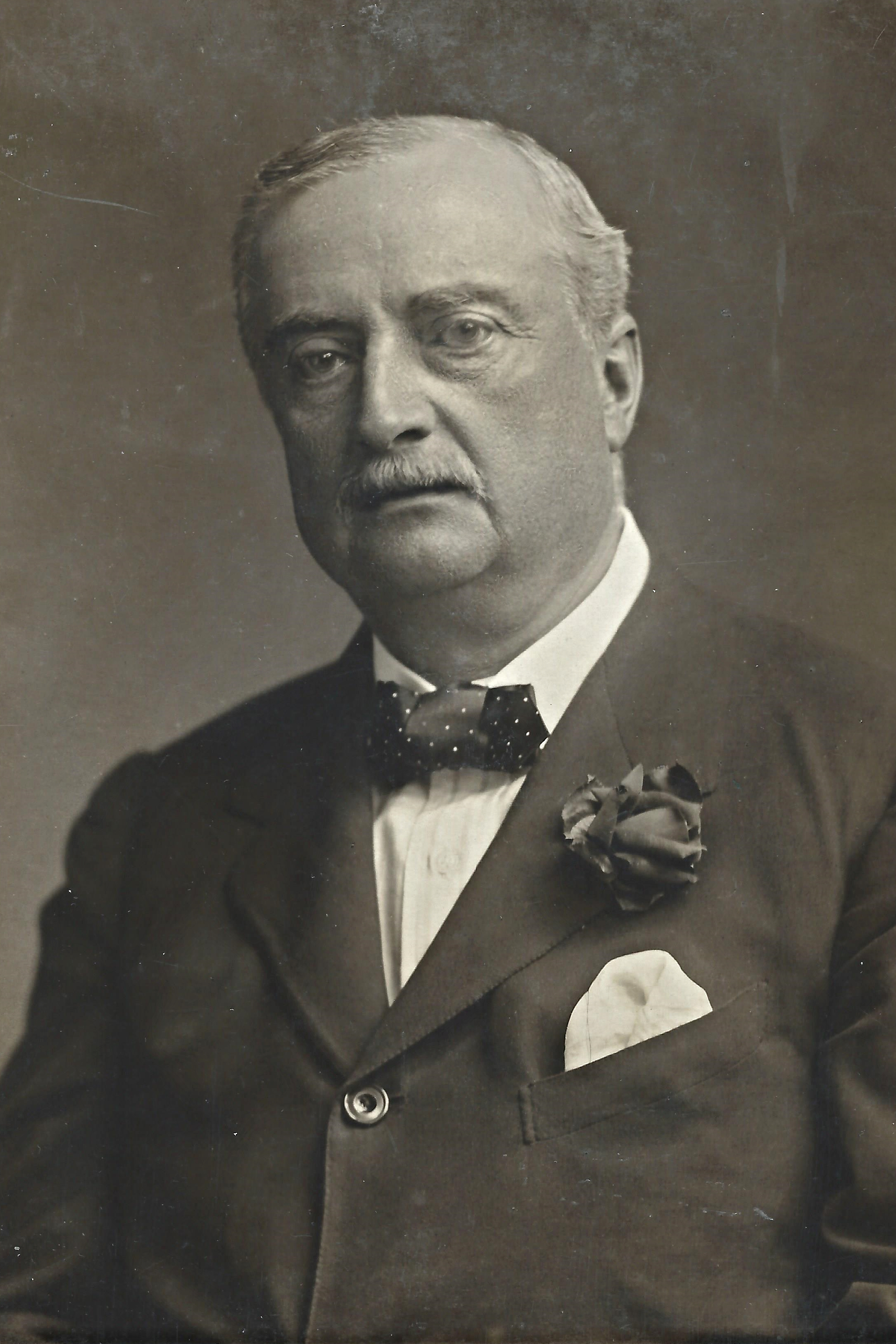

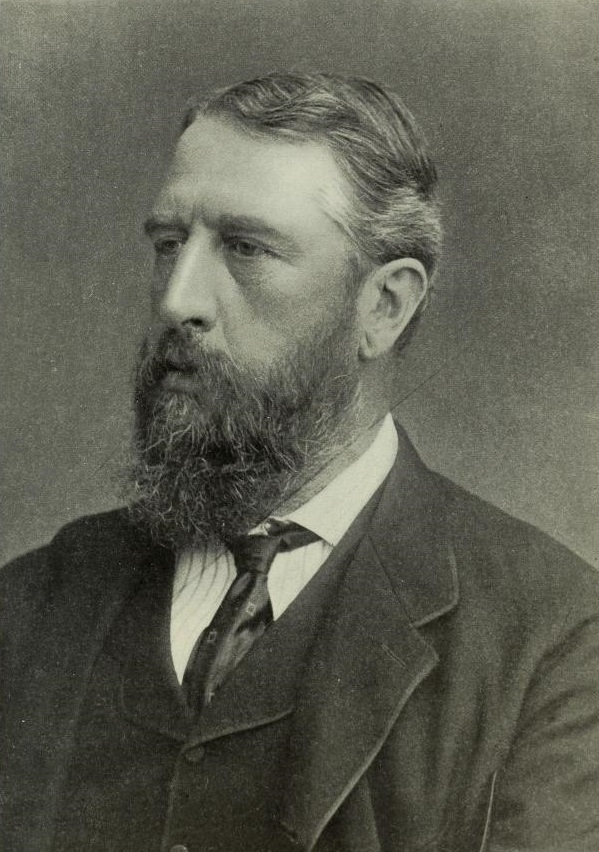

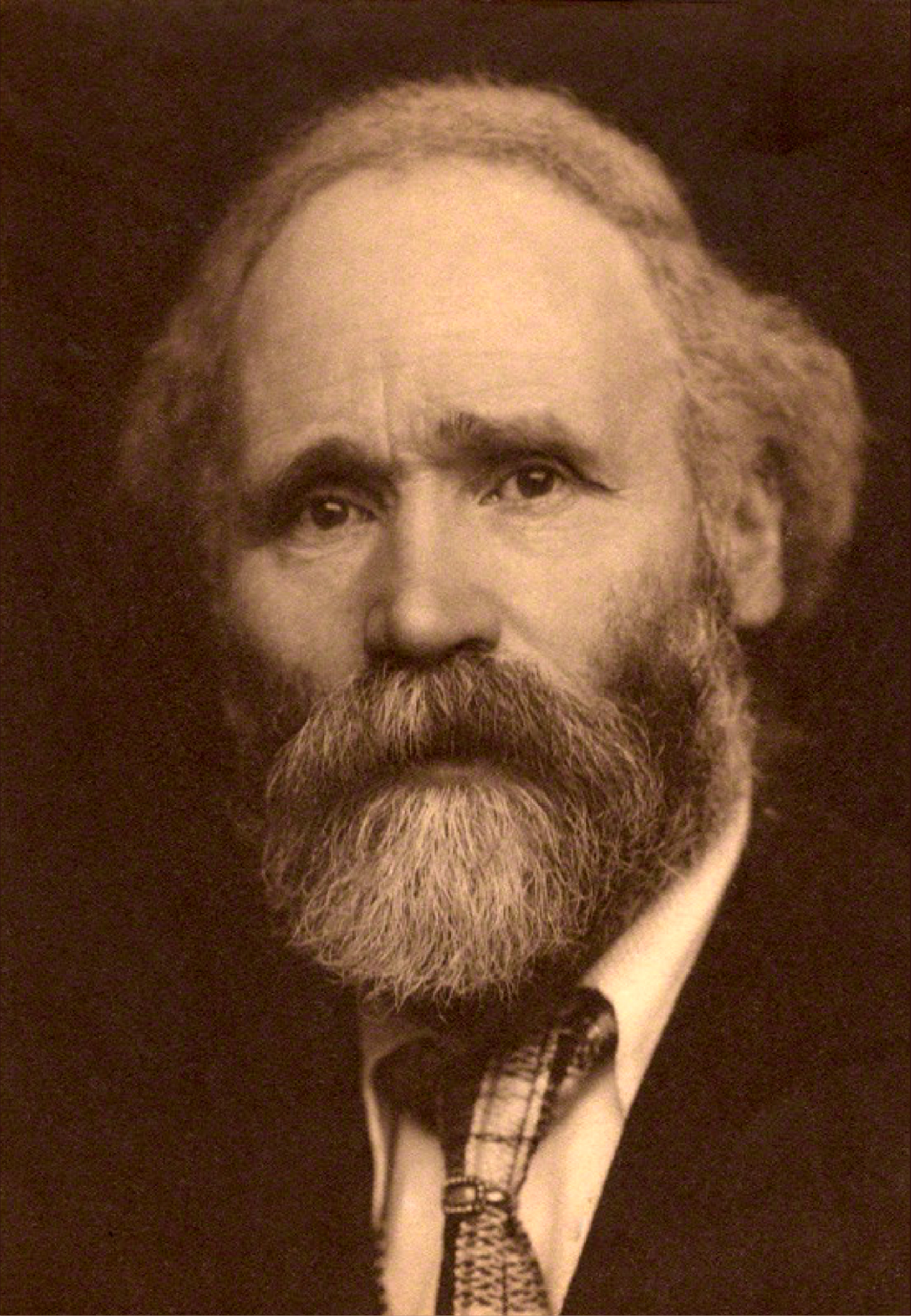
	First party	Second party	Third party
Leader	Marquess of Salisbury	Henry Campbell-Bannerman	John Redmond
Party	Conservative	Liberal	Irish Parliamentary
Alliance	Conservative-Liberal Unionist
Leader since	April 1881	December 1898	6 February 1900
Leader's seat	House of Lords	Stirling Burghs	Waterford City
Last election	340 seats, 39.8%	177 seats, 45.6%	82 seats, 3.9%
Seats won	335	183 (Note: Figure includes Speaker of the House of Commons William Court Gully in Carlisle)	77
Seat change	▼5	▲6	▼5
Popular vote	1,467,273	1,572,323	65,239
Percentage	41.8%	45.0%	1.8%
Swing	▲2.0 pp	▼0.7 pp	▼2.1 pp
	Fourth party	Fifth party
Leader	Duke of Devonshire	Keir Hardie
Party	Liberal Unionist	Labour Repr. Cmte.
Alliance	Conservative-Liberal Unionist
Leader since	1886	28 February 1900
Leader's seat	House of Lords	Ran in Merthyr Tydfil (won)
Last election	71 seats, 9.3%	Did not contest
Seats won	67	2
Seat change	▼4	▲2
Popular vote	300,685	62,698
Percentage	8.5%	1.3%
Swing	▼0.8 pp	New party
- Colours denote the winning party

- Diagram displaying the composition of the House of Commons following the election
Prime Minister before election
Marquess of Salisbury
Conservative
Prime Minister after
election
Marquess of Salisbury
Conservative

The 1900 United Kingdom general election was held between 26 September and 24 October 1900, following the dissolution of Parliament on 25 September. Also referred to as the Khaki Election (the first of several elections to bear this sobriquet), it was held at a time when it was widely believed that the Second Boer War had effectively been won (though in fact it was to continue for another two years).

The Conservative Party, led by Lord Salisbury and with its Liberal Unionist allies, secured a large majority of 134 seats, despite having received only 5.3% more votes than Henry Campbell-Bannerman's Liberals. This was largely owing to the Conservatives winning 163 seats that were uncontested by others. The Labour Representation Committee, later to become the Labour Party, participated in a general election for the first time. However, it had only been in existence for a few months; as a result, Keir Hardie and Richard Bell were the only LRC Members of Parliament elected in 1900.

This was the first occasion at which Winston Churchill was elected to the House of Commons. He had stood in the same constituency, Oldham, at a by-election held the previous year, but had lost. It was also the final general election of the Victorian era, as well as the last one at which the leader of either of the two largest parties (and by extension, the incumbent Prime Minister) sat in the House of Lords rather than the House of Commons.

== Electoral system ==
Most of the MPs were elected through first-past-the-post voting in single-member districts. Conversely, 54 MPs were elected in two-seat districts by the use of plurality block voting, where each voter could cast up to two votes.

== Candidates ==
Below is a table summarising the candidates of the 1900 general election.

Affiliation	Candidates
Conservative Party	452
Liberal Party	402
Irish Parliamentary Party	83 (Note: Includes candidate T. P. O'Connor, who stood in Liverpool Scotland.)
Liberal Unionist Party	101
Irish Unionist Party	26
Healyite Nationalist	16
Labour Representation Committee	15
Independent Unionist	5
Independent Nationalist	2
Independent Protestant	2 (Note: The candidates that stood were Benjamin Nicholson in Ashford and John Kensit in Brighton.)
Independent Liberal Unionist	1 (Note: Candidate Thomas Harrison stood in Belfast North.)
Independent Liberal	1 (Note: Candidate Sir John Austin stood in Osgoldcross.)
Independent Conservative	1 (Note: Candidate H. H. Montague-Smith stood in Westminster.)
Independent Labour	1 (Note: Candidate John Hempsall stood in Accrington.)
Independent	1 (Note: Candidate J. Sheldon stood in Bradford East.)
Scottish Workers'	1 (Note: Candidate Alfred Fletcher stood in Glasgow Camlachie.)
Crofters Party	1 (Note: Candidate Gavin Brown Clark stood in Caithness.)
Land Law Reform Association	1 (Note: Candidate F. C. Auld stood in Caithness.)
Total	1,102

== Outcome ==
=== Liberal Party ===
The Liberal Party maintained 45.0% of the vote share, with a minor drop of 0.7% when compared to the previous election. In England, the Liberals, saw very little in terms of change of the number of seats, despite several exchanges taking place: it lost 17 seats to the Conservative Party, but gained 24 from the Conservatives; its lost 6 seats to the Liberal Unionists, but gained 9 seats from the latter. In addition, in the seat of Osgoldcross, the incumbent MP Sir John Austin had since left the Liberal Party and voluntarily brought about the 1899 Osgoldcross by-election, which he won as an Independent Liberal. He stood again at this election under this label and retained the seat personally, however it represented a gain from the Liberal Party. Overall, the party decreased its number of seats to 9 at this election.

In Scotland, the party saw a very minor 1.5% drop in vote share, taking 50.2% of the votes in Scotland, but thereby maintaining its majority in votes. However, it saw a loss of 5 seats, primarily to the Conservative Party, and some to the Liberal Unionists. It did see 1 gain in exchanges from the Conservative Party in Inverness-shire, but suffered losses to both the Conservatives and Liberal Unionists. At 34 seats, it lost its majority of seats in Scotland. In Wales, it saw an increase in vote share and gains of 2 seats from 25 to 27 seats, which were gains from the Conservative Party and its ally, the Liberal Unionist Party. In Ireland, Charles Hemphill retained North Tyrone.

Within the Liberal party stood several Liberal-Labour sponsored candidates, with several holding seats in England. Such MPs won or held Battersea, Haggerston, one of the two seats in Leicester, Mid Durham, Morpeth, Wansbeck and Normanton. In Wales, William Abraham held in Rhondda. Overall, there were 8 Liberal-Labour MPs.

=== Conservative Party ===
The Conservative Party saw a slight increase in vote share of around 2.0%, but with a small decrease in seats across England, part of the wider only 0.5% increase vote share between itself and its allies, the Liberal Unionist Party. The Conservatives did retain 3 of its seats in the English university constituencies. It gained Bethnal Green South West, Hoxton, Hanley, Gainsborough, Cockermouth, Eskdale, Burnley, Stockton-on-Tees, Middlesbrough, Leeds East, Sheffield Brightside from the Liberal Party. The party also gained one of the two seats in the two-member seat of Plymouth from the Liberals, with the party already holding the other, as well as one of the two seats in Leicester, Sunderland and York. Additionally, it took both of the two seats in Portsmouth.

In exchange with the Liberal Unionists, it won Lambeth North, Marylebone West, Stoke-upon-Trent, Birmingham Edgbaston with the Liberal Unionists not standing against the Conservatives in the seat due to the parties' alliance. It may have also gained Heywood from the Liberal Unionists, with the MP switching to standing for the party at this election. However, it lost Halifax to the Liberal Unionists. It lost one of its university constituency seats in Oxford University to the Liberal Unionists.

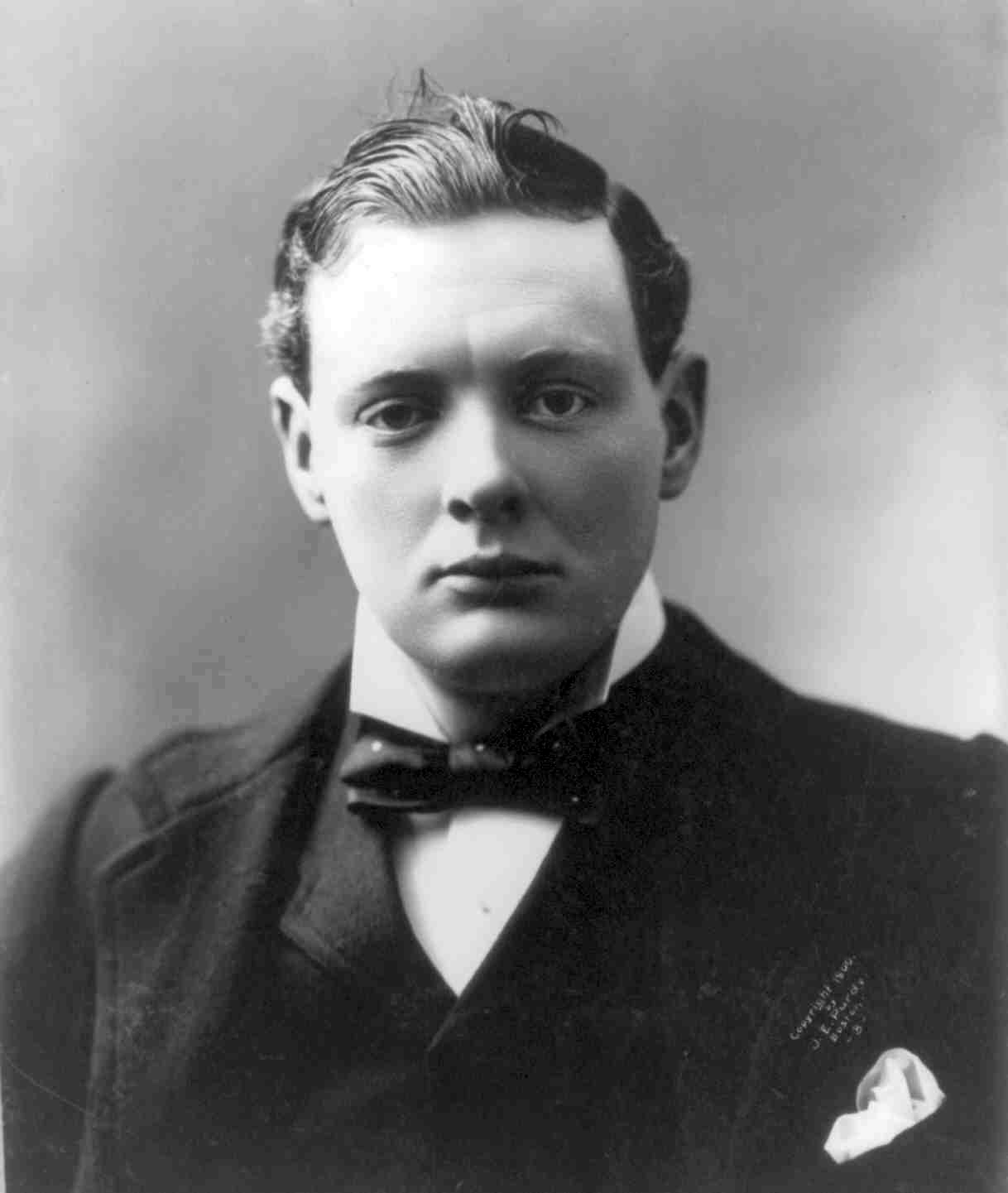
Winston Churchill

The Conservatives lost the single-member county and borough constituencies of Torquay, Frome, Stroud, Westbury, Reading, Hastings, Maidstone, Camberwell North, Haggerston, Wisbech, Walsall, Rugby, High Peak, Grantham, Mid Northamptonshire, Appleby, Lancaster, Radcliffe-cum-Farnworth, Crewe and Otley to the Liberal Party. It also lost both of its seats in Derby, with one going to the Liberals and another to the newly formed Labour Representation Committee. It lost its one seat in the multi-member seats of Northampton, Oldham and Stockport to the Liberals.

Notably, Conservative candidate Winston Churchill stood and won in Oldham, after having unsuccessfully stood in the seat in the 1899 Oldham by-election. His taking of the seat represented a gain from the Liberal Party, which he would go on to later join before the next election. Nevertheless, Churchill entered Parliament at this election as a Conservative MP.

In Scotland, the party saw a rise in seats at the election rom 19 to 21 seats. The party held the university constituency seats of Edinburgh and St Andrews Universities and Glasgow and Aberdeen Universities. It also held the county and borough seats of Elginshire and Nairnshire, Stirlingshire, Dunbartonshire,East Renfrewshire, West Renfrewshire, Ayr Burghs, Kilmarnock Burghs, Argyllshire, Buteshire, Glasgow Central, Glasgow College, South Lanarkshire, Kirkcudbright Stewartry, Wigtownshire and Roxburghshire.

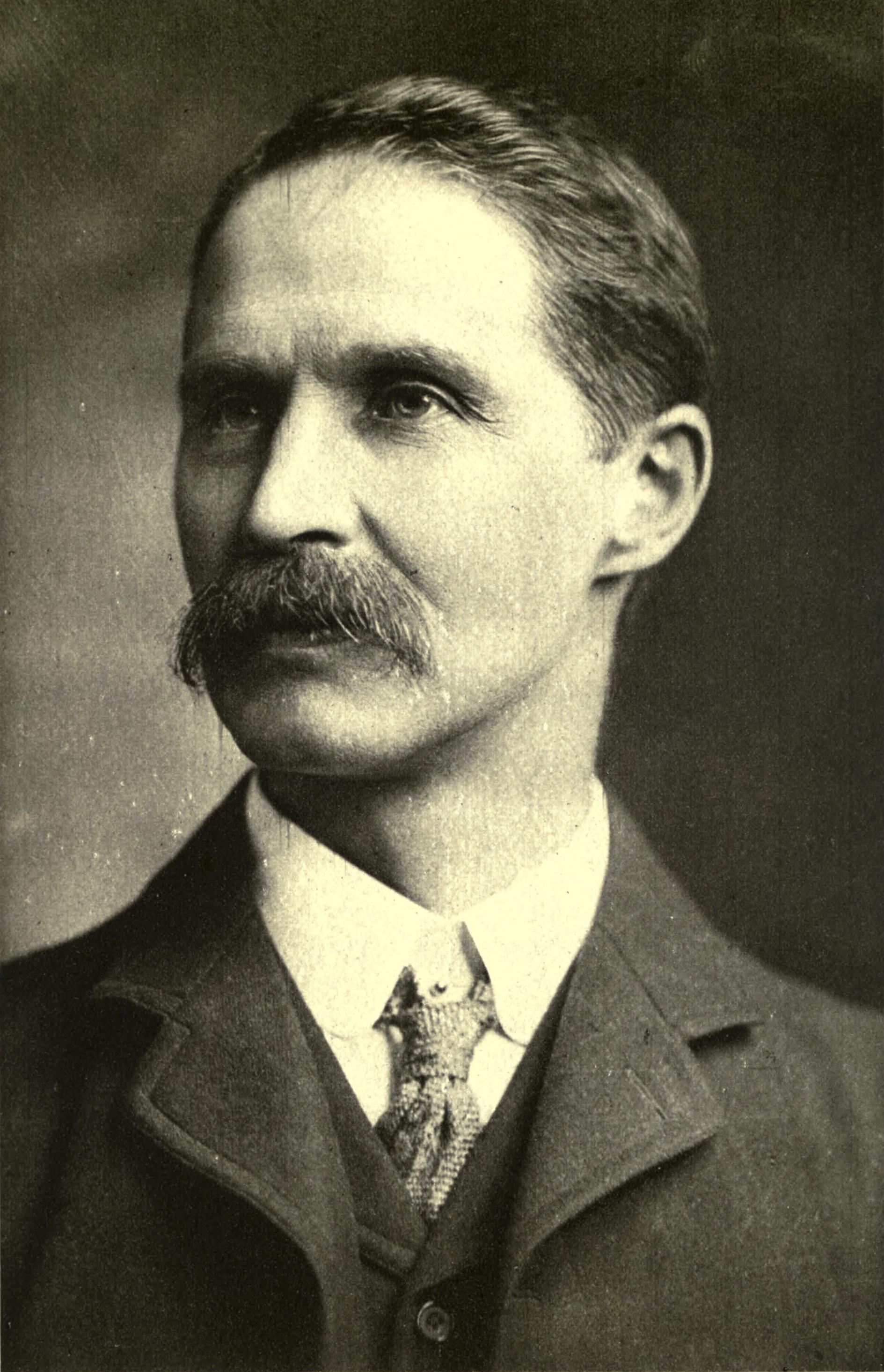
Bonar Law

Furthermore, the Conservatives won Glasgow Blackfriars and Hutchesontown and Glasgow Bridgeton from the Liberal Party, but Lost Inverness-shire to the Liberals. In Glasgow Blackfriars and Hutchesontown, future Prime Minister Bonar Law entered Parliament for the first time.

Between the constituency and parliamentary alliance with the Liberal Unionists, the Conservatives won Greenock in an exchange with the Liberal Unionist Party. In the seat, Liberal Unionist MP Thomas Sutherland did not stand for re-election, with Conservative candidate James Reid winning the seat for the party, but was otherwise a retain within the alliance. The Conservatives also won Wick Burghs from the Liberal Unionists, with candidate Arthur Bignold taking the seat. Conversely, however, it lost Glasgow St Rollox to the Liberal Unionist Party. Incumbent Conservative MP Ferdinand Begg did not stand for re-election, with Liberal Unionist John Wilson winning the seat, also retaining it within the alliance. Overall, the Conservative Party saw a loss of 2 seats but a gain of 4, taking of 21 seats at this election, which was an overall gain of two compared with the previous election.

In Wales, the Conservatives retained the seats of Montgomery, Denbigh Boroughs, South Glamorganshire, South Monmouthshire, Pembroke and Haverfordwest. The Conservatives also gained Monmouth Boroughs from the Liberal Party. However, it also lost Radnorshire, Cardiff and Swansea Town to the Liberal Party.

=== Liberal Unionist Party ===
The Liberal Unionist Party, led by the Duke of Devonshire (and Joseph Chamberlain in the House of Commons), saw a drop of 4 seats. In England, the party retained Bodmin, St Ives, Truro, Totnes, East Somerset, Bristol North, Aylesbury, St Pancras South, Biggleswade, Sudbury, Ludlow, Wellington (Shropshire), Handsworth, West Staffordshire, Ross, Droitwich, North Worcestershire, East Worcestershire, Warwick and Leamington, West Derbyshire, Lincoln, Peterborough, Liverpool Exchange, North Lonsdale, Manchester South, Darlington, South East Durham, Bradford Central, Shipley and Wakefield. It retained one of the two seats in both Bath and Southampton, as well as its university constituency seat in London University. It also held its metropolitan Birmingham seats of Birmingham Bordesley, Birmingham Central, Birmingham North, Birmingham South and Birmingham West. It gained Tavistock, Burton, Newcastle-under-Lyme, Great Grimsby, Durham, Tyneside from the Liberal Party. It also gained one of the two seats in Halifax from the Conservative Party, as well as one of the two seats in Oxford University

However, internally in the alliance with the Conservatives, the Liberal Unionists lost Lambeth North, Marylebone West, Stoke-upon-Trent and Birmingham Edgbaston to the Conservatives. It also lost Camborne, Barnstaple, Gloucester, Cricklade, South Norfolk, Wolverhampton South, Spalding, The Hartlepools and Skipton to the Liberal Party. Of some uncertainty is the candidacy of George Kemp in the constituency of Heywood. Kemp had been elected to the House of Commons as a Liberal Unionist in the 1895 general election. However, he had crossed the floor between elections, and had his allegiances between the Conservative Party, the Liberal Unionist Party and Liberal Party were uncertain, particularly as he would be elected as a Liberal in the January 1910 general election. As such, revised political listings consider labelling him as a Conservative rather than a Liberal Unionist, as he may have been instead tentatively elected as a Conservative. The Liberal Unionists therefore may have lost the seat of Heywood in this election.

In Wales, the party suffered swing against it to the Liberal Party and by way of the party only having one standing in Wales. John Jones Jenkins in Carmarthen Boroughs, who had won the seat at the last election after having run several times before, lost the seat to the Liberal Party. As a result, the party was without representation in Wales, with the party (although standing candidates at subsequent elections), and would not hold any more seats before its official merge with the Conservative Party in 1912.

In Scotland, it won around 24.1% of the vote, with the party standing 31 candidates in Scotland, an increase 3.5% in terms of vote share. With the Conservative Party standing 39 candidates in Scotland (and two in the University constituencies), and with neither party standing against each other, the alliance covered all seats in Scotland. Of note, writer Arthur Conan Doyle unsuccessfully stood in Edinburgh Central. He would stand again in 1906 in the seat of Hawick Burghs. The Liberal Unionists retained the seats of Inverness Burghs, West Perthshire, Falkirk Burghs, St Andrews Burghs, North Ayrshire, South Ayrshire, Glasgow Camlachie, Glasgow Tradeston, Partick, Edinburgh South, Edinburgh West and Peebles and Selkirk.

It also gained Orkney and Shetland, Sutherland, East Aberdeenshire and Dumfriesshire. Overall, when combined with the single loss in Greenock by exchange with the Conservatives and gain of Glasgow St Rollox from the Conservatives, the party saw a rise in seats from 13 at the previous election to 17 seats. Between the alliance of the parties, they held 38 of the 72 seats in Scotland, and held 49.0% of the vote share.

In Ireland, it stood candidates in Belfast West, South Londonderry and South Tyrone. Each won their seats; however, it lost Dublin St Stephen's Green, with a Unionist Party candidate running and losing in the seat to the reunited Irish Parliamentary Party.

=== Labour Representation Committee ===
This was the first election in which the Labour Representation Committee –– a precursor committee that would go on to become the Labour Party –– stood at an election. The party only stood 13 candidates in England, though stood 15 nationally with the other 2 candidates, including Leader Keir Hardie in Wales. Nationally, it took 1.3% of the vote, and won 2 seats in its first election.

In England, the party only took 1.4% of the vote, with the party gaining its first MP, Richard Bell, in one of the two seats in Derby. Bell, however, would fall out with the party after the election, and instead stand in defection as Liberal-Labour candidate in support of the Liberal Party in the next election.

In Wales, the group stood two candidates. These were founder and leader of the group, Keir Hardie, in Merthyr Tydfil and John Hodge in Gower. Hardie was successful in Merthyr Tydfil, winning one of the two seats in the constituency from the Liberal Party, and thus entering Parliament. Hodge, however, was unsuccessful against Liberal incumbent John Aeron Thomas, although achieved 47.4% of the vote. In all, the group gained one of its two seat first seats in Wales. The group would also contest the 1906 general election before emerging as the Labour Party following that election.

== Results ==
The following tables are based on the collations of seats and votes collected by F. W. S. Craig for the results in Great Britain, and seats and votes collected by Brian Mercer Walker for Ireland. The distinctions made between the Conservatives, Irish Unionists and Liberal Unionists in alterations to these works are set out according to Wesley Ferris.

=== Summary of seats returned ===
Party	Leader	MPs		Aggregate votes	
Party	Leader		Of total		Of total (Note: Adjusted for multi-member constituencies.)
Conservative-Liberal Unionist	Marquess of Salisbury	402	60.0%	1,767,958	50.3%
Conservative Party	Marquess of Salisbury	318	47.5%	1,424,158	40.8%
Liberal Unionist Party	Duke of Devonshire	67	10.0%	300,685	8.5%
Irish Unionist Party (Note: Stood under the Conservative Party Whip; all figures are attributed to the Conservative Party nationally.)	Edward James Saunderson	17	2.5%	43,115	1.0%
Liberal Party	Henry Campbell-Bannerman	183	27.3%	1,572,323	45.0%
Irish Parliamentary Party	John Redmond	77 (Note: Includes T. P. O'Connor in Liverpool Scotland.)	11.5%	65,239	1.8%
Healyite Nationalist	Tim Healy	4	0.6%	22,174	0.6%
Labour Representation Committee	Keir Hardie	2	0.3%	62,698	1.3%
Independent Liberal	—N/a	1	0.1%	5,609	0.2%
Independent Nationalist	—N/a	1	0.1%	3,642	0.1%

=== Full results ===

UK General Election 1900
		Candidates						Votes		
Party	Leader	Stood	Elected	Gained	Unseated	Net	% of total	%	No.	Net %
Conservative and Liberal Unionist	Marquess of Salisbury	569	402	32	41	−9	60.1	50.2	1,637,683	+1.0
Liberal	Sir Henry Campbell-Bannerman	402	183	38	32	+6	27.4	45.1	1,469,500	−0.5
Irish Parliamentary	John Redmond	83	76	2	8	−6	11.3	1.8	57,576	−0.8
Labour Repr. Cmte.	Keir Hardie	15	2	2	0	+2	0.3	1.3	41,900	N/A
Ind. Nationalist	N/A	18	6	6	0	+6	0.9	0.7	23,706	
Ind. Conservative	N/A	7	0	0	0	0	0	0.4	13,713	
Independent Liberal	N/A	3	1	1	0	+1	0.1	0.2	6,423	+0.1
Independent	N/A	3	0	0	0	0	0	0.2	4,800	+0.2
Scottish Workers	Robert Allan	1	0	0	0	0	0	0.1	3,107	N/A
Ind. Liberal Unionist	N/A	1	0	0	0	0	0	0.1	1,855	N/A
Independent Labour	N/A	1	0	0	0	0	0	0.0	433	+0.0

=== Voting summary ===
Popular vote
Liberal	45.0%
Conservative	41.8%
Liberal Unionist	8.5%
Irish Parliamentary	1.8%
Labour R. C.	1.3%
Others	1.6%

Popular vote (alliances)
Con-LU	50.3%
Liberal	45.0%
Irish Parliamentary	1.8%
Labour R. C.	1.3%
Others	1.6%

=== Seats summary ===
Parliamentary seats
Conservative	50.0%
Liberal	27.3%
Irish Parliamentary	11.6%
Liberal Unionist	10.0%
Labour R. C.	0.3%
Others	0.8%

Popular vote (alliances)
Con-LU	60.0%
Liberal	27.3%
Irish Parliamentary	11.6%
Labour R. C.	0.3%
Others	0.8%

== See also ==
- 1900 United Kingdom general election in England
- 1900 United Kingdom general election in Ireland
- 1900 United Kingdom general election in Scotland
- 1900 United Kingdom general election in Wales
- List of United Kingdom Parliament constituencies (1885–1918) by region
- List of MPs elected in the 1900 United Kingdom general election
- Parliamentary franchise in the United Kingdom 1885–1918
