= Alfred Fletcher (journalist) =

British journalist

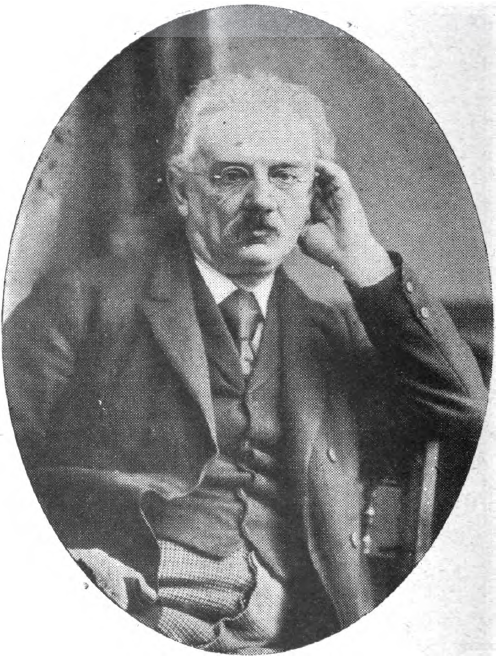
Fletcher, about 1898

Alfred Ewen Fletcher (1841 – 14 November 1915) was a British journalist active in the labour movement.

Born in Long Sutton in Lincolnshire, Fletcher became a teacher before moving into journalism as editor of the Barrow Vulcan. He moved to London in the 1870s, and in 1878 began working for the Daily Chronicle, becoming its editor in 1889. Under his editorship, the newspaper documented the New Unionism movement, and supported Irish Home Rule. He also incorporated more fiction and illustrations in the newspaper.

Fletcher left the editorship in 1895, to stand as the Liberal Party candidate in Greenock. He was unsuccessful, and instead became editor of The New Age, then a Christian socialist magazine.

At the 1900 UK general election, Fletcher stood in Glasgow Camlachie for the Scottish Workers' Representation Committee. The Committee had been set up by the Scottish Trades Union Congress and he was its only candidate at the election. He attracted the support of the Independent Labour Party, the Social Democratic Federation, the Glasgow Trades Council and, at the last moment, was endorsed by the Liberal Party, but he was not elected.

Media offices
Preceded by R. Whelan Boyle	Editor of the Daily Chronicle; 1889 – 1895	Succeeded by Henry William Massingham
Preceded by Frederick A. Atkins	Editor of The New Age; 1895 – 1898	Succeeded by Arthur Compton-Rickett
