= John Aeron Thomas =

British politician

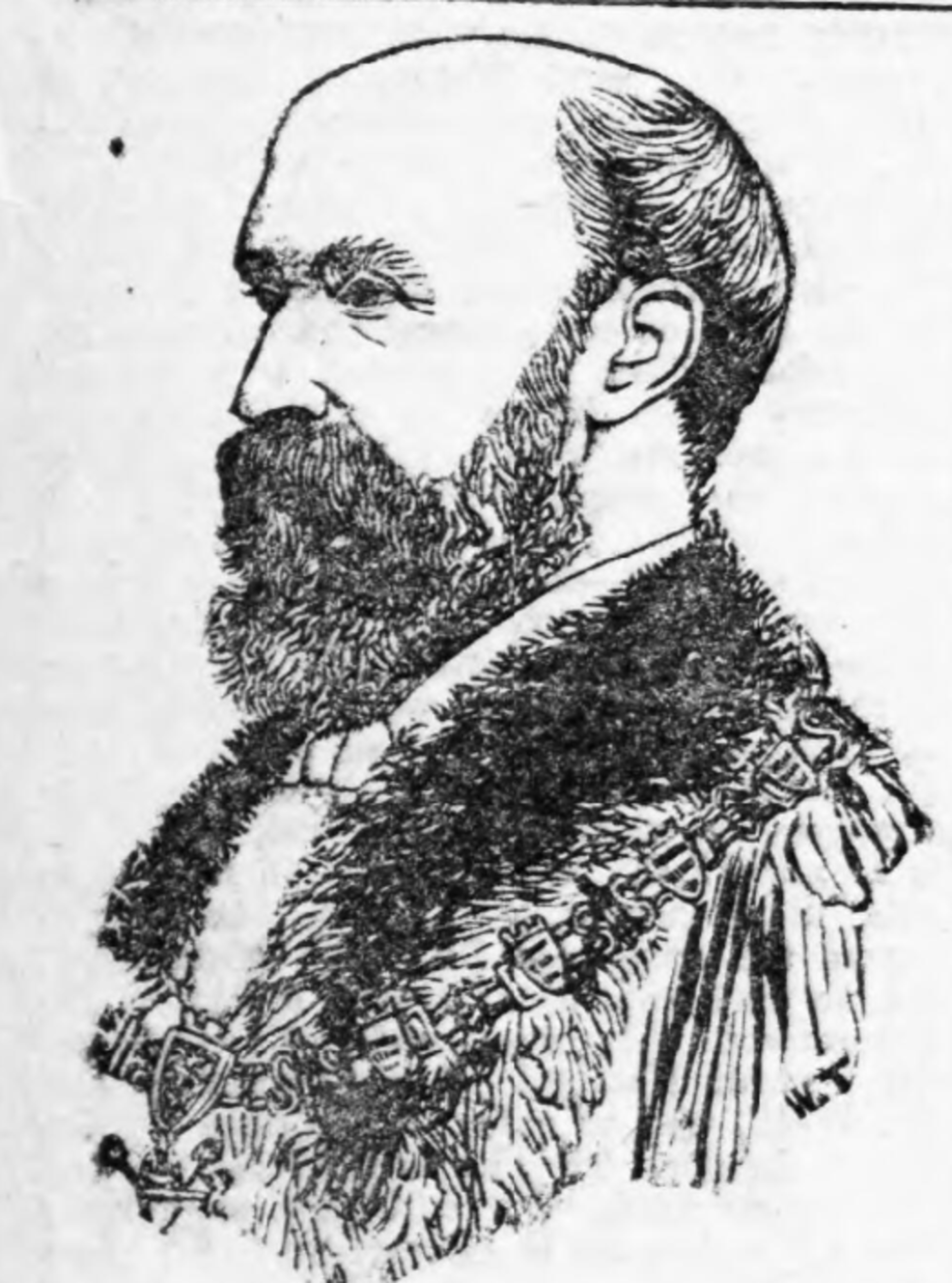
J Aeron Thomas as Mayor of Swansea, 1897

John Aeron Thomas (24 November 1850 – 1 February 1935), was a British Liberal Party politician and industrialist.

== Background ==
He was the son of Lewis Thomas, of Panteryrod, Cardiganshire. He was educated at Rhydowen and at Milford grammar school. He married in 1880, Eleanor Lewis of Nantgwynne, Carmarthenshire. They had two sons and one daughter.

== Career ==
He became a Solicitor in 1874 working for Aeron Thomas and co. of Swansea. He was also a colliery proprietor and tin-plate manufacturer. He was and Alderman of Swansea Council and Mayor of Swansea from 1897 to 1898, a justice of the peace and a Member of Swansea Harbour Trust. He sat as Liberal MP for the Gower from 1900 to 1906;

General election 1900 Gower District of Boroughs Electorate 12,267
Party	Candidate	Votes	%	±%
Liberal	John Aeron Thomas	4,276	52.6	
Independent Labour	John Hodge	3,853	47.4	
Majority		423	5.2	
Turnout			66.3	
Liberal hold		Swing		

He retired at the general election of January 1906. He did not stand for parliament again.

== Sources ==
- Who Was Who
- British parliamentary election results 1885–1918, Craig, F. W. S.

Parliament of the United Kingdom
Preceded by David Randell	Member of Parliament for Gower; 1900–January 1906	Succeeded by John Williams
