= Khaki election =

Election heavily influenced by militarist sentiment

In Westminster systems of government, a khaki election is any national election which is heavily influenced by wartime or postwar sentiment. In the British general election of 1900, the Conservative Party government of Lord Salisbury was returned to office, defeating a disunited Liberal Party. The reason for this name is that the election was held in the midst of the Second Boer War and khaki was the colour of the relatively new military uniform of the British Army that had been universally adopted in that war.

The term was later used to describe two later elections like the 1918 general election, fought at the end of World War I, which resulted in a huge victory for David Lloyd George's wartime coalition government and the 1945 general election, held after the end of World War II in Europe and in the closing days of the Pacific War, where Labour Party leader Clement Attlee won by a landslide. Another such case is the 1983 general election in which the Conservative government of Margaret Thatcher was elected into office despite its previous unpopularity, which was linked to the economic situation. The Falklands War, along with a divided opposition, ensured the next Conservative term in office.

The term is also applied to the 1917 Canadian federal election, which was held during World War I. By allowing servicemen and women related to servicemen to vote, Sir Robert Borden's Unionist Party won a majority.

The term also has currency in Australia. In 2015, the Labor Party Opposition accused the Coalition federal government of attempting to manufacture a khaki election by emphasising terror and military action in response to the 2014 rise of violent Islamic extremism from the Islamic State terrorist group.
