= 1906 United Kingdom general election in England =

- 12 Jan. – 8 Feb. 1906

All 461 English seats to the House of Commons
- Turnout: 83.6% (▲7.6 pp)
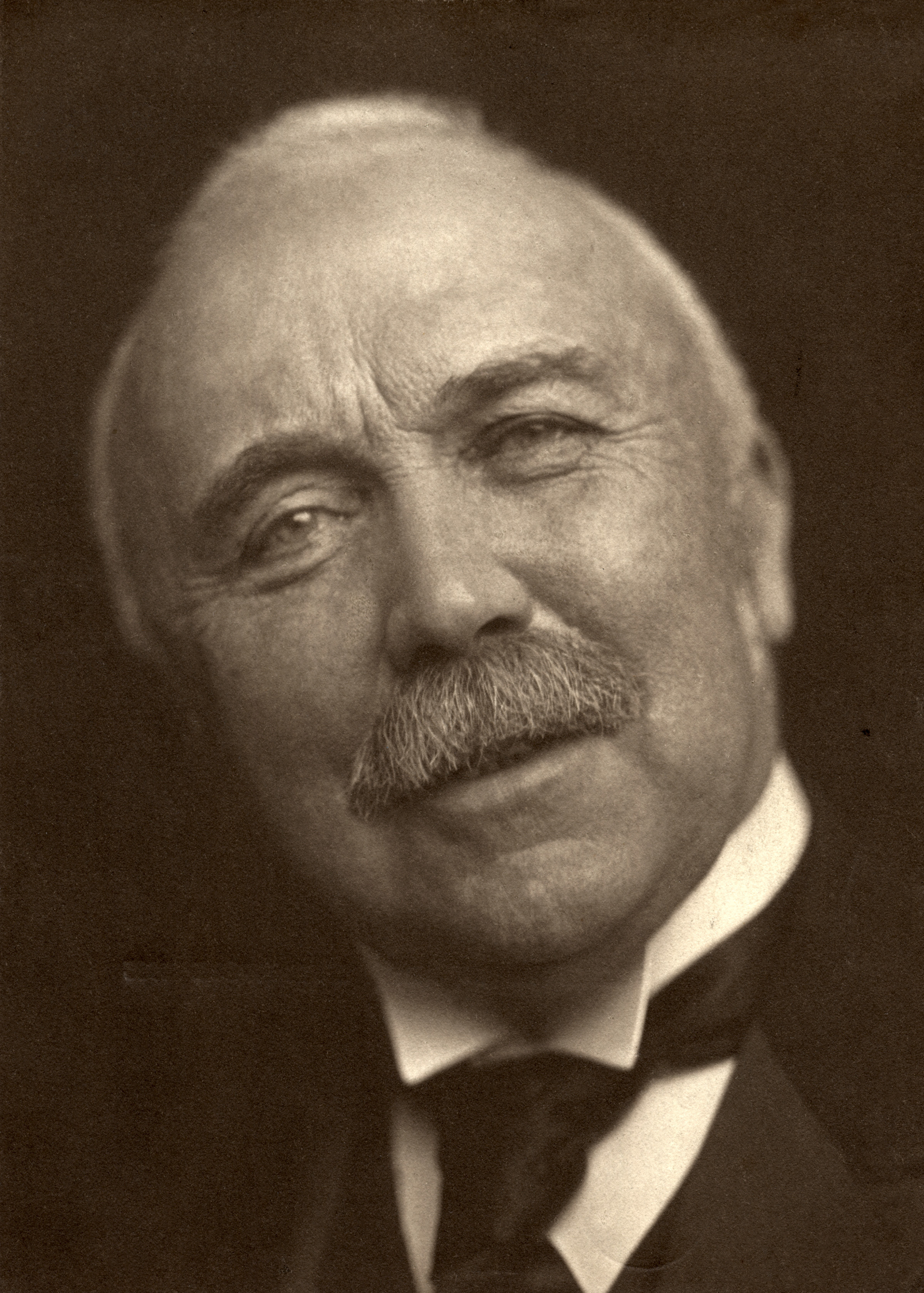

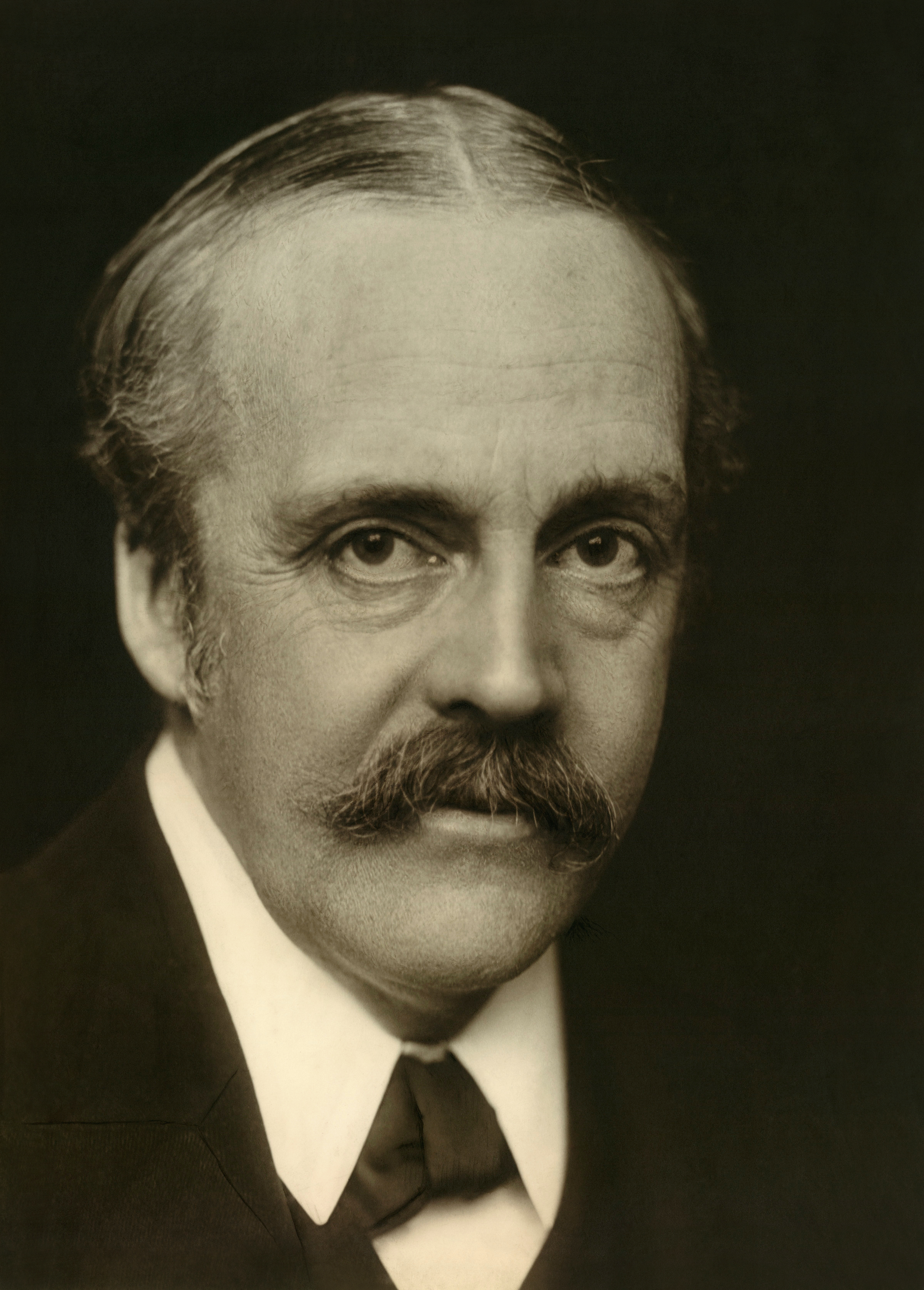

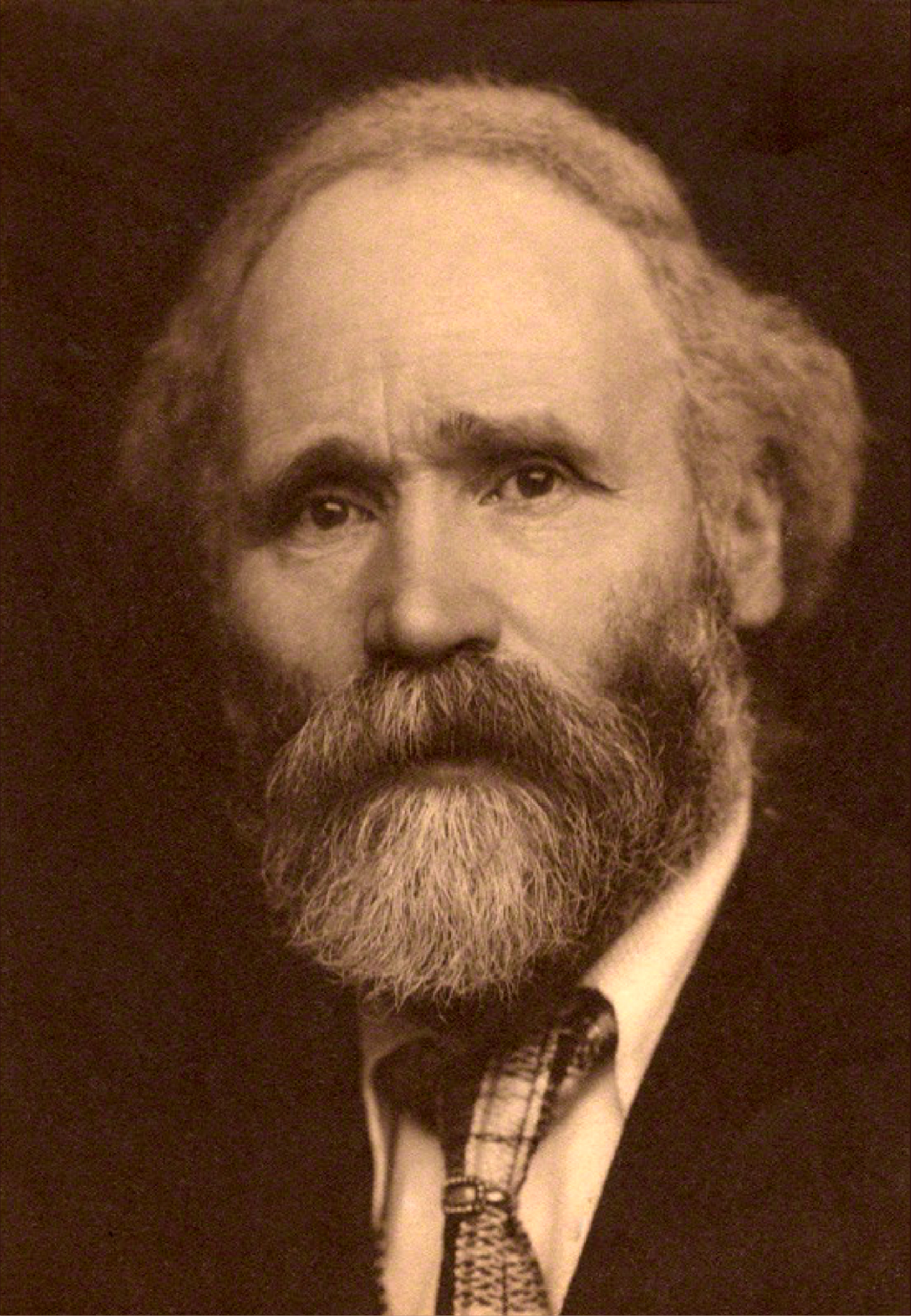

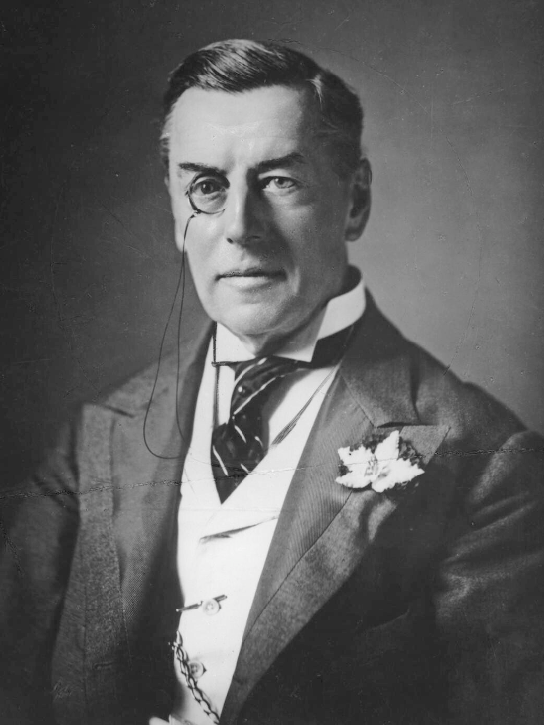
	First party	Second party
Leader	Henry Campbell-Bannerman	Arthur Balfour
Party	Liberal	Conservative
Alliance	Gladstone–MacDonald pact	Conservative-Liberal Unionist
Leader since	December 1898	11 June 1902
Leader's seat	Stirling Burghs	Manchester East (lost seat)
Last election	121 seats, (Note: Combined results for borough, county and university seats) 45.6%	291 seats, 45.8%
Seats won	306	107 (Note: Figure includes Speaker of the House of Commons James Lowther in Penrith.)
Seat change	▲185	▼184
Popular vote	2,255,358 (Note: Total and percentage votes given here are for territorial constituencies only)	1,750,078
Percentage	49.0%	37.8%
Swing	▲3.4 pp	▼8.0 pp
	Third party	Fourth party
Leader	Keir Hardie	Joseph Chamberlain
Party	Labour Repr. Cmte.	Liberal Unionist
Alliance	Gladstone–MacDonald pact	Conservative-Liberal Unionist
Leader since	28 February 1900	1903
Leader's seat	Merthyr Tydfil	Birmingham West
Last election	1 seat, 1.4%	46 seats, 6.6%
Seats won	26	20
Seat change	▲25	▼26
Popular vote	288,285	300,722
Percentage	5.3%	6.5%
Swing	▲3.9 pp	▼0.1 pp

From 12 January to 8 February 1906, the 1906 United Kingdom general election was held in England, to elect all 670 members of the House of Commons, with 461 seats being in England. 456 seats represented territorial constituencies contested under the first past the post electoral system, and several multi-member constituencies under the block voting system; and 5 additional seats represented the 3 university constituencies which returned members under different voting systems.

The election was held as a result of the resignation of the Conservative Government after a series of defeats in by-elections and internal disputes over tariff reform. The Liberal Party formed a minority Liberal Government and immediately requested a dissolution. It was the first of two general elections held during the reign of King Edward VII.

When combined with results from across the United Kingdom the result was a landslide victory for the Liberals against the Conservative Party, whose leader, Arthur Balfour, lost his seat, and its allies the Liberal Unionist Party; the Conservatives won the lowest number of seats it ever had in its history, which was only unsurpassed in 2024. The primary reason given by historians for the Conservatives' and Liberal Unionists' weakness resulted from the party's split over the issue of free trade (Joseph Chamberlain had resigned from government in September 1903 in order to campaign for Tariff Reform, which would allow "preferential tariffs"). Many working-class people at the time saw this as a threat to the price of food, hence the debate was nicknamed "Big Loaf, Little Loaf". Under Henry Campbell-Bannerman, the Liberals' landslide victory of 125 seats over all other parties led to the passing of social legislation known as the Liberal reforms.

It was the worst seat result of the Conservative Party in England since its formation at the time, with the party beating the Tory Party's result in England in the 1832 general election. With a combined county, borough and university constituency results of the Conservative Party at approximately 107 seats, and when combined with its ally the Liberal Unionist Party at a total of 127 seats, Conservatives would only face a defeat this large again in the 2024 general election in England. It was the last election in which the Liberal Party would hold the majority (or indeed most) seats in England.

== Candidates ==
Below is a table summarising the candidates of the 1906 general election in England, excluding those in the university constituencies.

Affiliation	Candidates
Liberal Party	421
Conservative Party	368
Liberal Unionist Party	67
Labour Representation Committee	43
Social Democratic Federation	7
Independent Conservative	6
Independent Labour	6
Free Trader	2 (Note: The candidates that stood were Arthur Elliot in Durham and Sir Charles Seely in Lincoln.)
Nationalist Party	1 (Note: Candidate T. P. O'Connor stood in Liverpool Scotland.)
Independent Liberal	1 (Note: Candidate Murray Spencer Richardson stood in Sevenoaks.)
Independent Protestant	1 (Note: Candidate John Alfred Kensit stood in Birkenhead.)
Lancashire and Cheshire Women's Textile	1 (Note: Candidate Thorley Smith stood in Wigan.)
London Liberal and Radical	1 (Note: Candidate Dadabhai Naoroji stood in Lambeth North.)
Naval	1 (Note: Candidate Fred T. Jane stood in Portsmouth.)
Thanet Conservative League	1 (Note: Candidate Frederick E McCormick Goodhart stood in Isle of Thanet.)
Free Church and Progressive	1 (Note: Candidate William Riley stood in Hackney South.)
Total	928

== Analysis ==
=== Liberal Party ===
The Liberal Party led by Henry Campbell-Bannerman saw a massive majority both nationally and in England, with the party winning 306 seats, an increase of 185 seats. The party won 49.0% of the vote in England, a minor increase by 3.4%. The party only lost 2 seats to Conservatives, and 2 seat to the Labour Representation Committee, with the otherwise party gaining 189 seats from the Conservatives and Liberal Unionists.

It also gained Osgoldcross. Independent Liberal MP Sir John Austin had stood down at this election, leaving Parliament, with the Liberals re-taking the seat. Notably, Winston Churchill had defected from the Conservative Party after having won his seat as such in Oldham. However, Churchill ran instead in Manchester North West, winning as a Liberal candidate; however, he would lose the seat at the 1908 Manchester North West by-election caused by him being made the president of the Board of Trade. Churchill would, however, re-enter Parliament in Scotland at the 1908 Dundee by-election, and remain there for the next election.

Within the Liberal Party count were several Liberal-Labour faction MPs who won or held seats in England. These were Dartford, Battersea, Finsbury Central, Haggerston, Hanley, Stoke-upon-Trent, Nuneaton, Chesterfield, Nottingham South, North Northamptonshire, Burnley, Salford North, Birkenhead, Mid Durham, Gateshead, Morpeth, Wansbeck, Middlesbrough, Hallamshire and Normanton. The faction also one of the two seats in each of Derby and Leicester. As such, the Liberal took 306 seats, within which 22 were held by Liberal-Labour MPs.

=== Conservative Party ===
It was the worst seat result of the Conservative Party in England since its formation at the time, with the party beating the Tory Party's result in England in the 1832 general election. With a combined county, borough and university constituency results of the Conservative Party at approximately 107 seats, and when combined with its ally the Liberal Unionist Party at a total of 127 seats, Conservatives would only face a defeat this large again in the 2024 general election in England.

The Conservatives saw a drop in vote share of around 8.0% to 37.8%, but with a significant decrease in seats across England, with a wider 8.1% decrease vote share to 44.3% between itself and its allies, the Liberal Unionist Party. The Conservatives did retain 3 of its seats in the English university constituencies. It lost 187 seat in England to both the Liberals and Labour Representation Committee, off-set by a few gains. It gained the seats of Hastings, Maidstone which it had lost in the previous election, and took Wakefield technically from the Liberal Unionists. Overall, the party only took 104 county and borough constituency seats, and held its 3 university constituency seats.

Another major upset was in Manchester East, where Leader of the Conservative Party and incumbent Prime Minister Arthur Balfour lost his seat, with Liberal candidate Thomas Gardner Horridge winning the seat. Balfour would, however, would remain as leader and re-enter Parliament in City of London at the February 1906 City of London by-election.

=== Liberal Unionist Party ===
The Liberal Unionist Party, led by Joseph Chamberlain, which saw splits over free trade policy with the Conservative Party and internally, saw only a relatively small 0.1% decrease in vote to 6.5% of the vote, but with a drop of 26 seats. The Liberal Unionists stood more candidates in England than in the last election, and saw a steady vote share, particularly due to more of its candidates facing opponents in its seats rather than running unopposed. The party retained Totnes, Aylesbury, Ludlow, Burton, Handsworth, East Worcestershire, West Derbyshire, Great Grimsby, Darlington, Durham and South East Durham. The party may have retained the seat of North Lonsdale. Seminal collations classed George Haddock as a winning Conservative, replacing the retiring Liberal Unionist Lord Richard Cavendish; however, subsequent research on Haddock's candidature placed him instead as a winning Liberal Unionist, with the party thereby retaining the seat.

It also retained its university constituency seats in London University and Oxford University. It also held its metropolitan Birmingham seats of Birmingham Bordesley, Birmingham Central, Birmingham North, Birmingham South and Birmingham West. Its only gain in the election was in Croydon, wherein Hugh Oakeley Arnold-Forster won the seat, with Conservative Charles Ritchie not standing, retiring from Parliament. The gain was technically a gain from the Conservatives, however the Conservatives did not stand against the party as party its national alliance.

However, in its heavy losses, it lost Bodmin, St Ives, Truro, Tavistock, East Somerset, Bristol North, St Pancras South, Biggleswade, Sudbury, Wellington (Shropshire), Newcastle-under-Lyme, West Staffordshire, Ross, Droitwich, North Worcestershire, Warwick and Leamington, Lincoln, Peterborough, Manchester South, Liverpool Exchange, Tyneside, Bradford Central, Shipley to the Liberal party. It also lost it one seat in each of Bath, Southampton and Halifax to the Liberals. Between it and the Conservative Party, the Conservatives won Wakefield from the Liberal Unionists. Liberal Unionist MP, William Wentworth-Fitzwilliam, took his peerage to the House of Lords, with Conservative Edward Brotherton winning the seat in the 1902 Wakefield by-election. Nevertheless, Brotherton's retain was a gain from the Liberal Unionist, running unopposed by the party.

Overall, the Liberal Unionist suffered its worst result both in England and Nationally. With it suffering 27 losses and only 1 gain, it lost a net 26 seats in England. Between it and the Conservative Party, they only held a combined 127 seats in England, including the university constituencies.

=== Labour Representation Committee ===
Henderson (on left) in 1906, with other leading figures in the new Labour Party

The Labour Representation Committee led by Keir Hardie saw a surge in representation in England. The party took a total of 26 seats overall. The committee did see a loss, with the group's first MP Richard Bell, in one of the two seats in Derby. Bell defected, standing and winning instead a as Liberal-Labour candidate in support of the Liberal Party.

The group otherwise won Chatham, Deptford, Woolwich, West Ham South, Wolverhampton West, Barrow and Furness, Manchester Gorton, Ince, Manchester North East, Manchester South West, Newton, St Helens, Westhoughton, Bradford West, Leeds East from the Conservatives. It won Clitheroe and Barnard Castle from the Liberal Party. Future Leader of the Labour Party Arthur Henderson entered Parliament in Barnard Castle. It also took one of the two seats in Norwich, Leicester, Blackburn, Bolton, Preston, Stockport, Sunderland, Newcastle-upon-Tyne from the Conservatives. It also won one of the two seats in Halifax from the Liberal Unionists.

In the seat of Chester-le-Street, John Wilkinson Taylor was elected as an Independent Labour MP. Taylor's candidature had for technical reasons not been endorsed by the Labour Representation Committee but he joined the Parliamentary Labour Party upon election.

The Labour Representation Committee would form the Labour Party following the election, and standing the following elections as such.

== Seats summary ==
Below is a table summarising the total number of seats, gains and losses for each party in both the territorial county and borough constituencies and the university constituencies.

Party	Seats				
Party	Total	Gains	Losses	Net	Of all (%)
Liberal	306 (Note: Includes 22 Liberal-Labour MPs.)	189	4	▲185	66.4
Conservative-Liberal Unionist	127	4	214	▼210	27.5
Conservative	107	3	187	▼184	23.2
Liberal Unionist	20	1	27	▼26	4.3
Labour Repr. Cmte.	26	26	1	▲25	5.6
Independent Labour	1	1	0	▲1	0.2
Irish Nationalist	1	0	0	Steady	0.2
Independent Liberal	0	0	1	▼1	—
Total	461				

== County and borough results ==
Below is a table summarising the constituency results of the 1906 general election in England, excluding the result in the university constituencies.

Party	Seats					Aggregate votes		
Party	Total	Gains	Losses	Net	Of total (%)	Total	Of total (%) (Note: Adjusted for multi-member constituencies.)	Change (%)
Liberal	306 (Note: Includes 22 Liberal-Labour MPs.)	189	4	▲185	67.1	2,255,358	49.0	▲3.4
Conservative-Liberal Unionist	122	4	214	▼210	26.7	2,050,800	44.3	▼8.1
Conservative	104	3	187	▼184	22.8	1,750,078	37.8	▼8.0
Liberal Unionist	18	1 (Note: Croydon.)	27	▼26	3.9	300,722	6.5	▼0.1
Labour Repr. Cmte.	26	26	1 (Note: Derby.)	▲25	5.7	288,285	5.3	▲3.9
Social Democratic Federation	0	Did not stand in 1900			—	20,039	0.4	—N/a
Independent Labour	1 (Note: John Wilkinson Taylor in Chester-le-Street, although he would join the Labour Representation Committee formally following the election.)	1	0	▲1	0.2	16,681	0.4	▲0.4
Ind. Conservative	0	0	0	Steady	—	10,352	0.2	▲0.2
Free Trader	0	New			—	4,598	0.1	New
Irish Nationalist	1 (Note: T. P. O'Connor in Liverpool Scotland.)	0	0	Steady	0.2	2,808	0.1	Steady
Women's Textile	0	New			—	2,205	0.1	New
Independent Protestant	0	0	0	Steady	—	2,118	0.1	▼0.2
Thanet Conservative	0	New			—	925	0.0	New
Free Church and Progressive	0	New			—	804	0.0	New
London Liberal and Radical	0	New			—	733	0.0	New
Independent Liberal	0	0	1 (Note: Sir John Austin in Osgoldcross.)	▼1	—	44	0.0	▼0.2
Total	456			0	100.0	4,657,609	100.0	0.0
Registered voters, and turnout						5,189,442 (Note: Electorate in contested constituencies. The total electorate was 5,416,537.)	83.6	▲7.6

=== Popular vote ===
Popular vote
Liberal	49.0%
Conservative	37.8%
Liberal Unionist	6.5%
Labour R. C.	5.3%
Irish Nationalist	0.1%
Others	1.3%

Popular vote (alliances)
Liberal	49.0%
Con-LU	44.3%
Labour R. C.	5.3%
Irish Nationalist	0.1%
Others	1.3%

=== Parliament seats ===
Parliament seats
Liberal	67.1%
Conservative	22.8%
Labour R. C.	5.7%
Liberal Unionist	3.9%
Ind. Labour	0.2%
Irish Nationalist	0.2%

Parliament seats (alliances)
Liberal	67.1%
Con-LU	26.7%
Labour R. C.	5.7%
Ind. Labour	0.2%
Irish Nationalist	0.2%

== University constituency results ==
=== University results summary ===
Below is a table summarising the seats and vote share of the English university constituencies in the 1906 general election.

Party	Seats				Aggregate votes	
Party	Total	Gains	Losses	Net	Total	Of all (%)
Conservative-Liberal Unionist	5	0	0	Steady	7,866	69.4
Conservative	3	0	0	Steady	6,026	53.2
Liberal Unionist	2	0	0	Steady	1,840	16.2
Liberal	0	Did not stand in 1900			1,816	16.0
Free Trader	0	New			1,653	14.6
Total	5				11,335	

=== Cambridge University ===
The constituency for Cambridge University returned two Members of Parliament using the Plurality block voting electoral system. The electorate consisted of graduates of the university.

General election 1906: Cambridge University (2 seats)
Party	Candidate	Votes	%	±%
Conservative	Samuel Butcher	3,050	39.72	N/A
Conservative	John Rawlinson	2,976	38.76	N/A
Free Trader	Sir John Eldon Gorst	1,653	21.53	New
Majority		1,323	17.23	N/A
Turnout		4,063	65.8	N/A
Registered electors		6,972		
Conservative hold		Swing	N/A	
Conservative hold		Swing	N/A	

=== London University ===
The constituency for London University returned one Member of Parliament using the First-past-the-post electoral system. The electorate consisted of graduates of the university.

General election 1906: London University
Party	Candidate	Votes	%	±%
Liberal Unionist	Philip Magnus	1,840	50.3	N/A
Liberal	Michael Foster	1,816	49.7	N/A
Majority		24	0.6	N/A
Turnout		3,656	70.1	N/A
Registered electors		5,212		
Liberal Unionist hold		Swing	N/A	

=== Oxford University ===
The constituency for Oxford University returned two Members of Parliament using the Plurality block voting electoral system. The electorate consisted of graduates of the university.

General election 13 January 1906: Oxford University (2 seats)
Party	Candidate	Votes	%	±%
Conservative	John Gilbert Talbot	Unopposed		
Liberal Unionist	Sir William Anson	Unopposed		
Conservative hold				
Liberal Unionist hold				

== See also ==
- 1906 United Kingdom general election in Ireland
- 1906 United Kingdom general election in Scotland
- 1906 United Kingdom general election in Wales
- List of United Kingdom Parliament constituencies (1885–1918) by region
