= 1906 United Kingdom general election in Scotland =

- 12 January – 8 February 1906

All 72 Scottish seats to the House of Commons
- Turnout: 80.9% (▲5.6 pp)
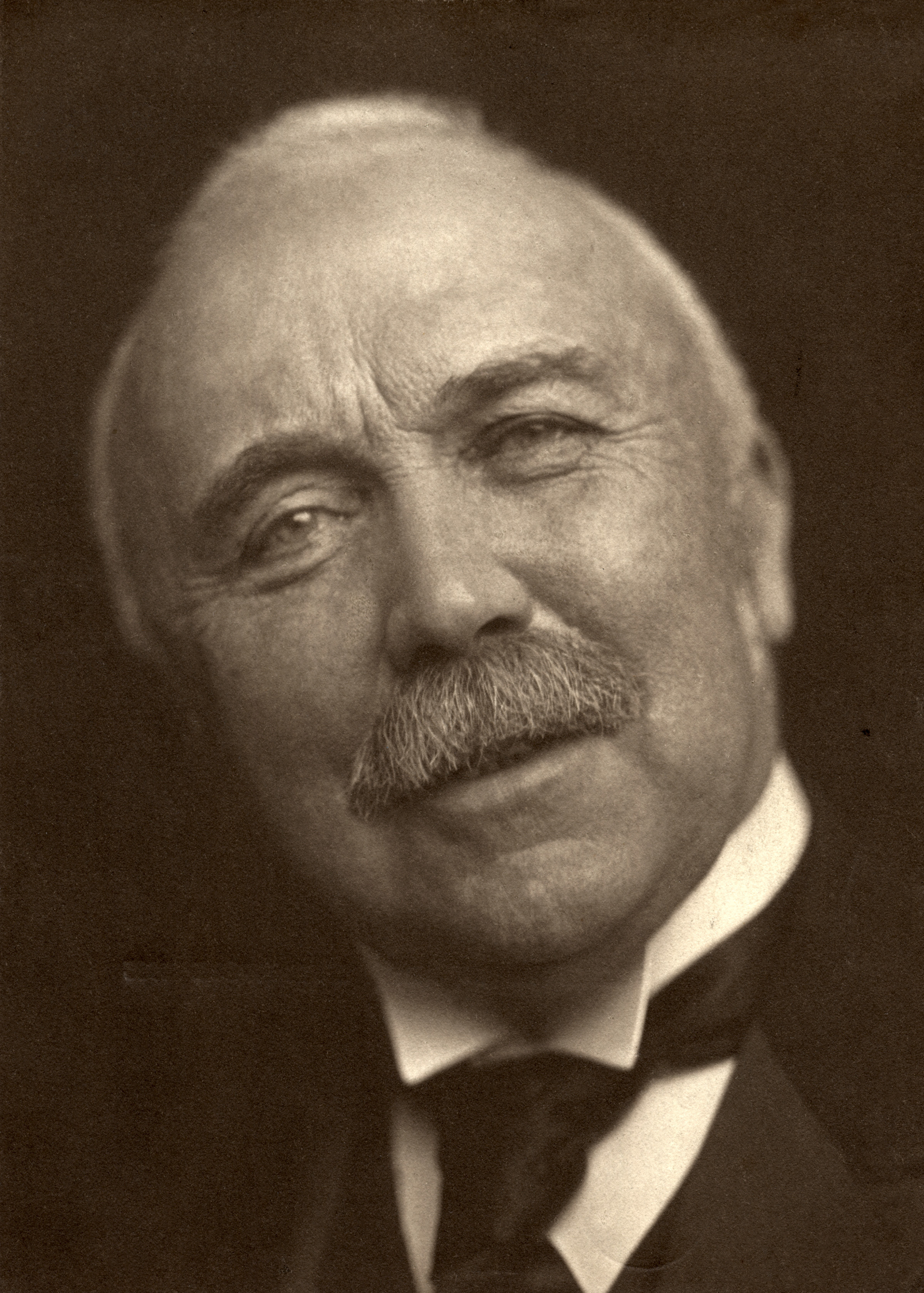

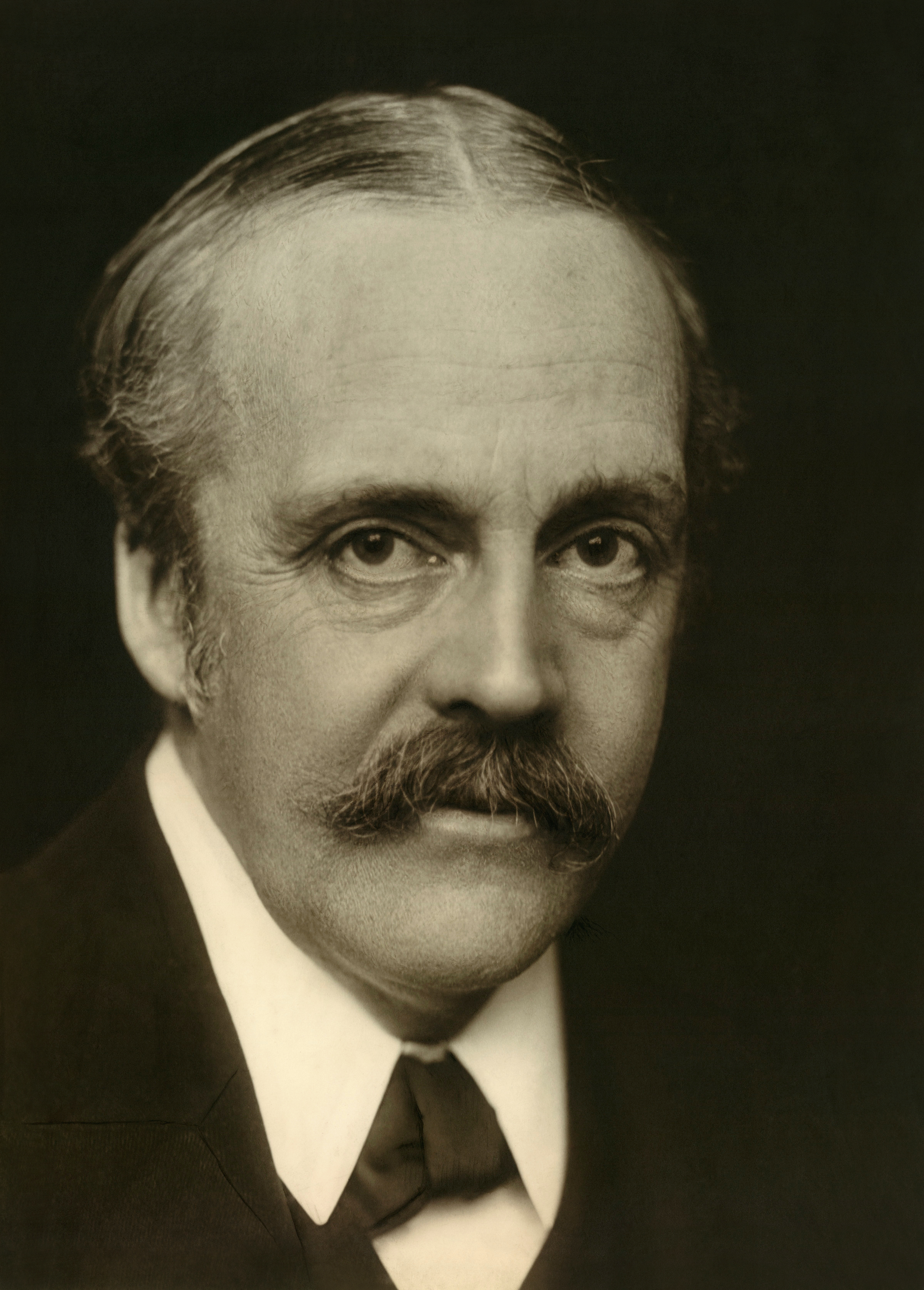

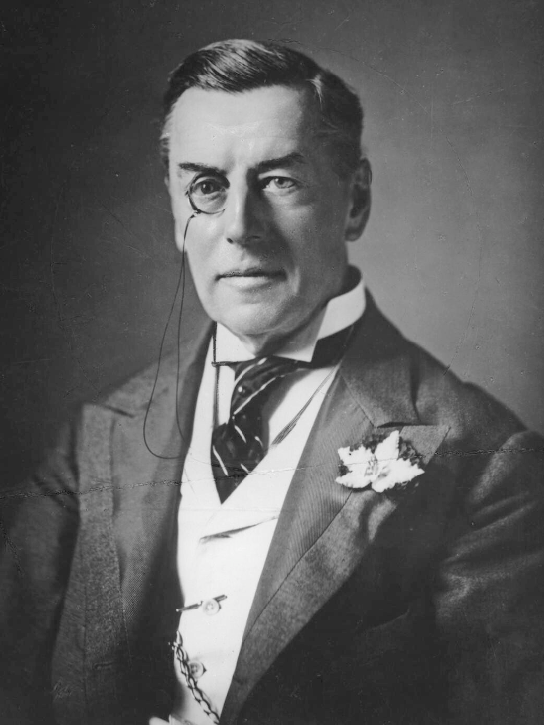

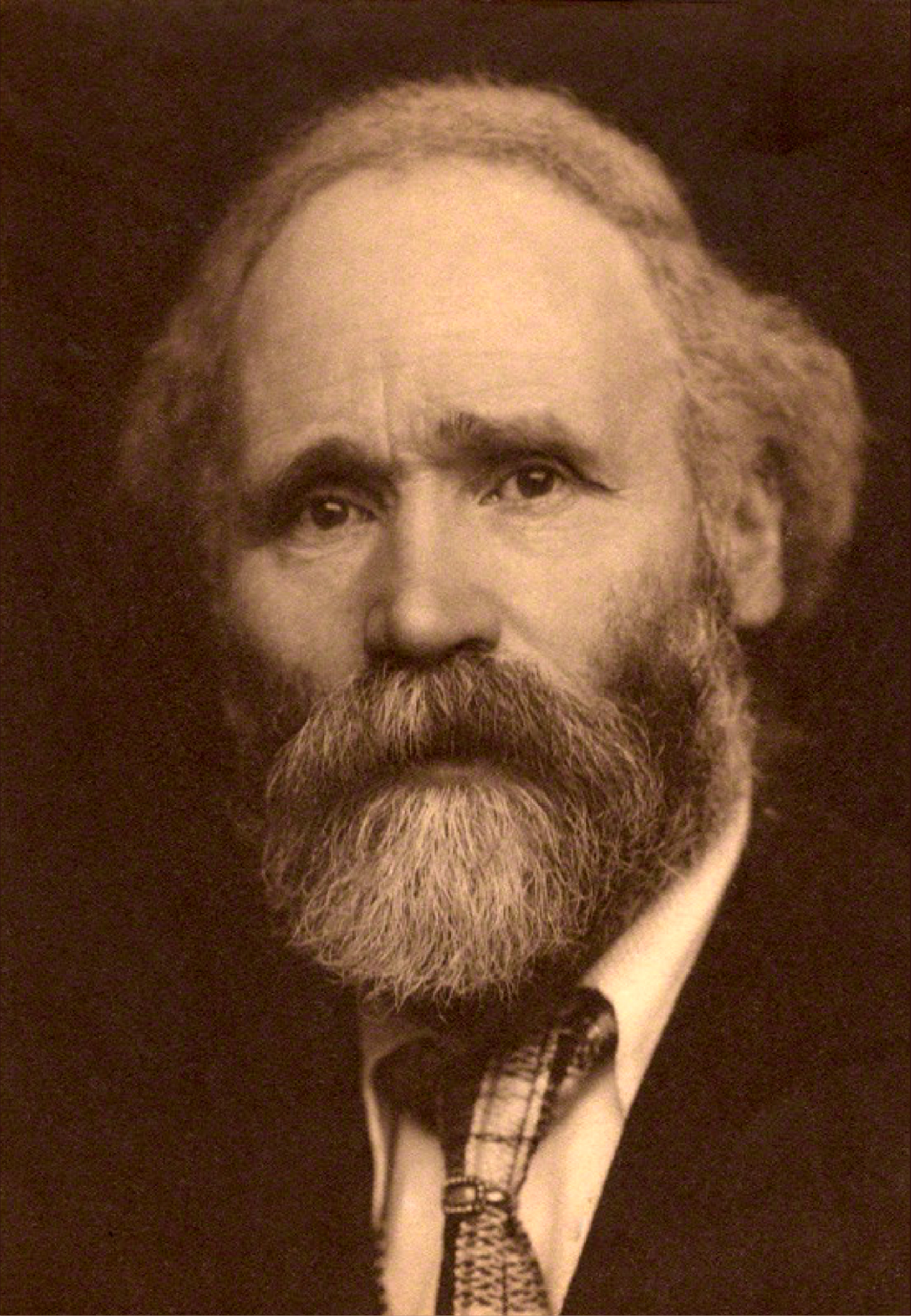
| | First party | Second party |
|---|---|---|
| Leader | Henry Campbell-Bannerman | Arthur Balfour |
| Party | Liberal | Conservative |
| Alliance | Gladstone–MacDonald pact | Conservative-Liberal Unionist |
| Leader since | December 1898 | 11 June 1902 |
| Leader's seat | Stirling Burghs | Manchester East (lost seat) |
| Last election | 34 seats, (Note: Combined results for burgh, county and university seats) 50.2% | 21 seats, 24.9% |
| Seats won | 58 | 7 |
| Seat change | ▲24 | ▼14 |
| Popular vote | 336,400 (Note: Total and percentage votes given here are for territorial constituencies only) | 143,052 |
| Percentage | 56.4% | 24.3% |
| Swing | ▲6.2 pp | ▼0.6 pp |
| | Third party | Fourth party |
| Leader | Joseph Chamberlain | Keir Hardie |
| Party | Liberal Unionist | Labour Repr. Cmte. |
| Alliance | Conservative-Liberal Unionist | Gladstone–MacDonald pact |
| Leader since | 1903 | 28 February 1900 |
| Leader's seat | Birmingham West | Merthyr Tydfil |
| Last election | 17 seats, 24.1% | Did not contest |
| Seats won | 5 | 2 |
| Seat change | ▼12 | ▲2 |
| Popular vote | 82,750 | 16,897 |
| Percentage | 13.9% | 2.3% |
| Swing | ▼10.2 pp | New party |
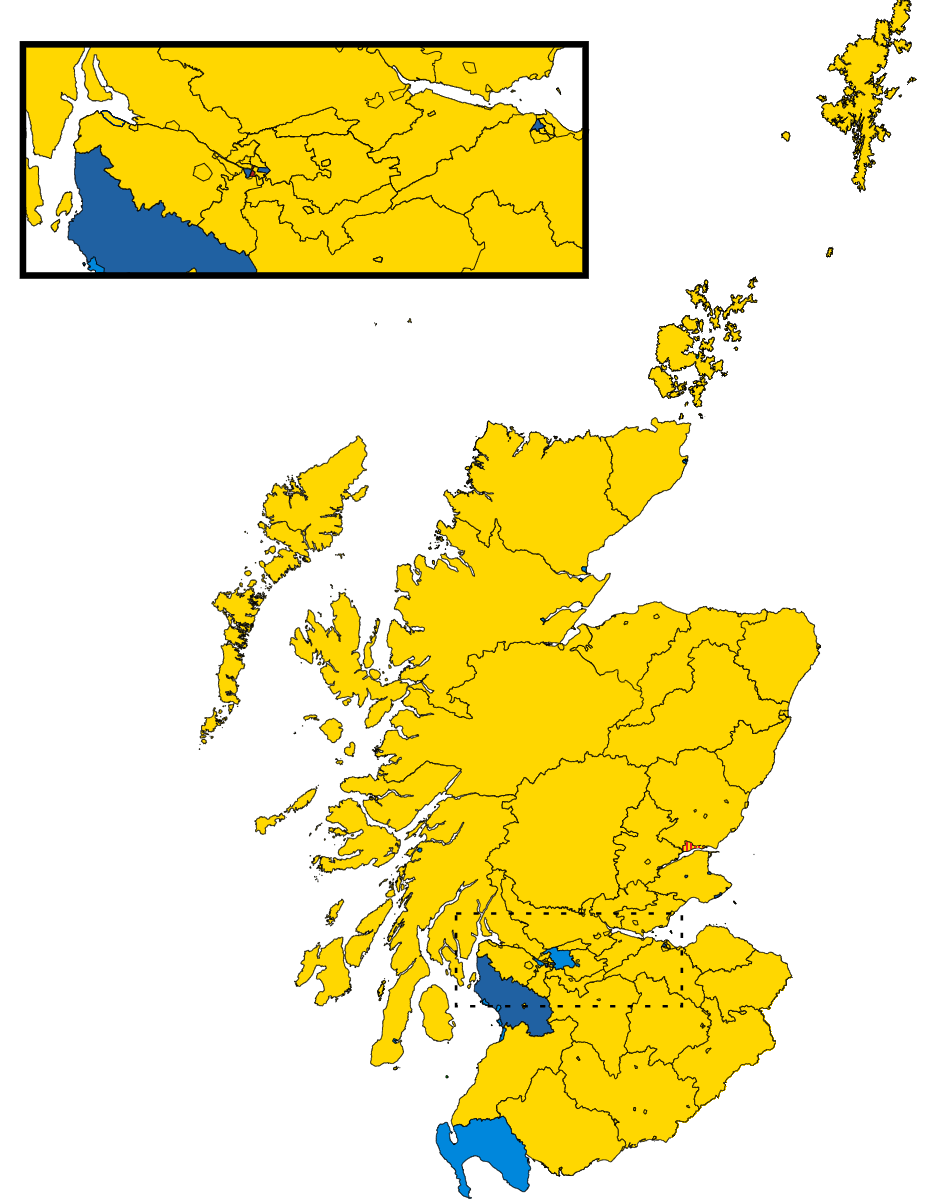
- Results of the 1906 election in Scotland for the county and burgh seats

The 1906 United Kingdom general election was held between 12 January and 8 February 1906, and members were returned for all Scottish seats. Scotland was allocated 72 seats in total, with 70 territorial seats, comprising 32 burgh constituencies and 37 county constituencies. (Note: One burgh seat, Dundee, was represented by two members of parliament.) There were also two university constituencies, Glasgow and Aberdeen Universities and Edinburgh and St Andrews Universities.

The election was held as a result of the resignation of the Conservative Government after a series of defeats in by-elections and internal disputes over tariff reform. The Liberal Party formed a minority Liberal Government and immediately requested a dissolution. It was the first of two general elections held during the reign of King Edward VII.

When combined with results from across the United Kingdom the result was a landslide victory for the Liberals against the Conservative Party, whose leader, Arthur Balfour, lost his seat, and its allies the Liberal Unionist Party; the Conservatives won the lowest number of seats it ever had in its history, a nadir unsurpassed until 2024. The primary reason given by historians for the Conservatives and Liberal Unionists' weakness resulted from the party's split over the issue of free trade (Joseph Chamberlain had resigned from government in September 1903 in order to campaign for Tariff Reform, which would allow "preferential tariffs"). Many working-class people at the time saw this as a threat to the price of food, hence the debate was nicknamed "Big Loaf, Little Loaf". The Liberals' landslide victory of 125 seats over all other parties led to the passing of social legislation known as the Liberal reforms.

In Scotland the opposition Liberals under Henry Campbell-Bannerman won a crushing victory, winning 56.4% of vote and 58 out of Scotland's 72 seats.

== Candidates ==
Below is a table summarising the candidates of the 1906 general election in Scotland, excluding those in the university constituencies.

| Affiliation | Candidates |
|---|---|
| Scottish Liberal Party | 70 |
| Conservative Party | 45 |
| Liberal Unionist Party | 24 |
| Scottish Workers' | 5 |
| Labour Representation Committee | 4 |
| Social Democratic Federation | 1 (Note: Candidate Tom Kennedy stood in Aberdeen North.) |
| Music Copyright Association | 1 (Note: Candidate A. S. Gibson stood in Mid Lanarkshire.) |
| Fiscal Reform | 1 (Note: Candidate Abraham Rosenthal stood in Glasgow Tradeston.) |
| Total | 151 |

== Analysis ==
=== Liberal Party ===
In Scotland the opposition Liberals under Henry Campbell-Bannerman won a crushing victory, winning 56.4% of vote and 58 out of Scotland's 72 seats. The Liberals gained 27 seats from the Conservatives and Liberal Unionists. However, it suffered 3 losses; 2 seats to the Conservative Party, and one to the Labour Party. The figure of 56.4% has not been surpassed by any single party in any election since, although the coalition of parties forming the National Government would secure 64.0% at the 1931 election.

=== Conservative Party ===
The Conservative Party, which was in an alliance with the Liberal Unionist Party in Parliament and at the constituency level, saw a heavy drop in seats at the election. With the party standing 45 candidates, more than it stood than at the previous election, it took around 24.3% of the vote, a decrease of 0.4%. The party held the university constituency seats of Edinburgh and St Andrews Universities and Glasgow and Aberdeen Universities. It also held the county and borough seats of Wick Burghs, Ayr Burghs and Wigtownshire. Notably, in Ayrshire Burghs, George Younger was elected, after first contesting the seat at the 1904 Ayr Burghs by-election after the death of the Conservative incumbent. His win in the seat was a retain overall in the election, despite the Liberals winning the by-election. Younger would go on to be the chairman of the Unionist Party upon its formation in 1912 following the merging of the Conservative and Liberal Unionist parties.

George Younger

Despite is loss in vote share overall, it gained Glasgow Govan and North West Lanarkshire. In both seats, the Conservatives stood against Liberal candidates, but also respective labour movement candidates. Although the Conservatives lost vote share in each seat, the labour candidates took more vote share in stead from the Liberals.

However, it lost Elginshire and Nairnshire, Stirlingshire, Dunbartonshire, Greenock, East Renfrewshire, West Renfrewshire, Kilmarnock Burghs, Argyllshire, Buteshire, Glasgow Bridgeton, Glasgow Central, Glasgow College, South Lanarkshire, Kirkcudbright Stewartry, and Roxburghshire to the Liberal Party. It also lost Glasgow Blackfriars and Hutchesontown to the Labour Party. George Barnes unseated incumbent sitting MP, Bonar Law, who later would go on to become Prime Minister. Law would leave Parliament briefly at this election, with his re-entry to Parliament occurring in England at the 1906 Dulwich by-election. Law would return to a Scottish constituency in Glasgow Central in the 1918 general election. Overall, with 2 gains but 16 losses, the party was reduced from 21 seats to just 7 in Scotland.

=== Liberal Unionist Party ===
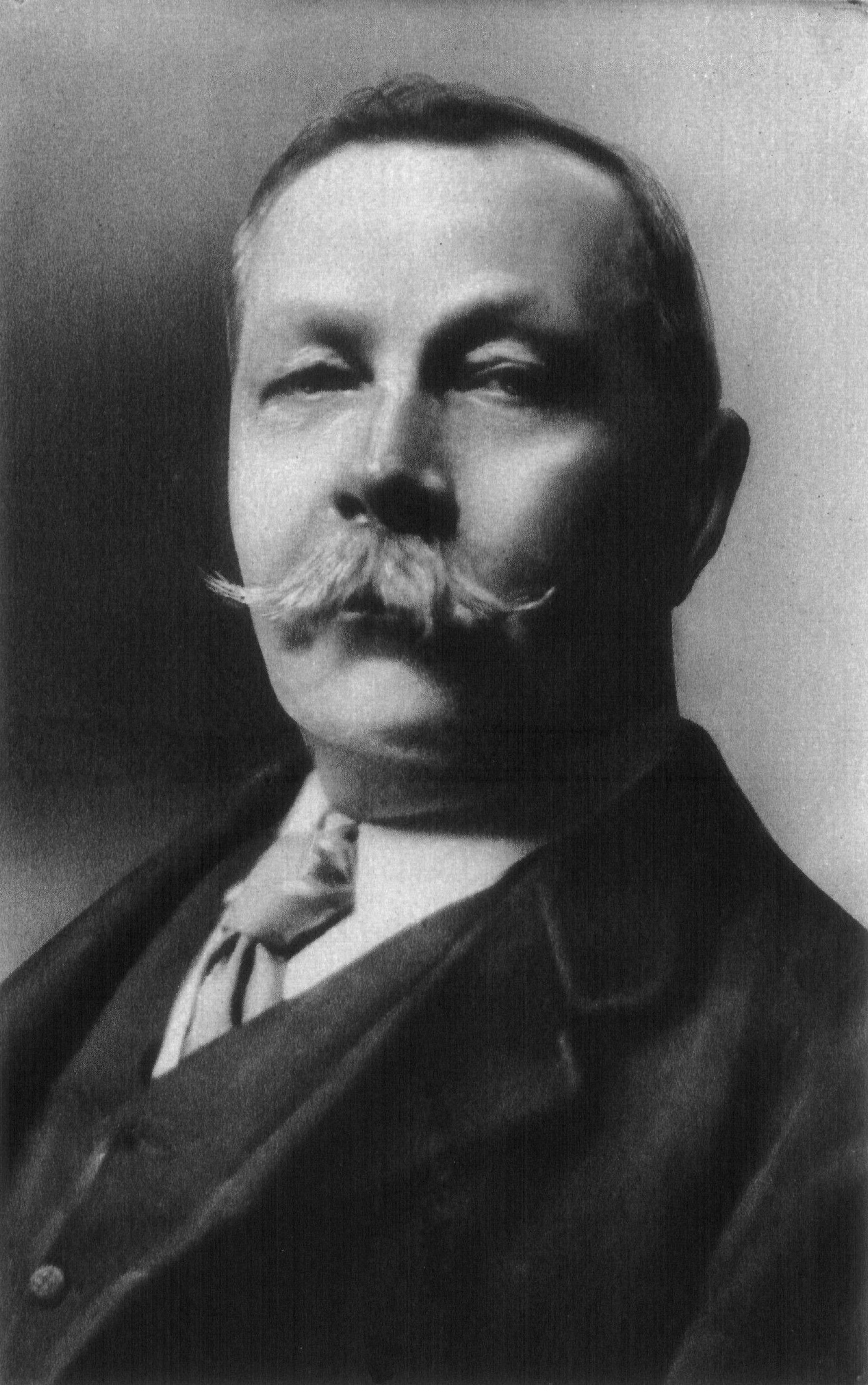
Conan Doyle

The Liberal Unionist Party won around 13.9% of the vote, a very sharp 10.4% drop in terms of vote share, with the party standing 24 candidates in Scotland which was far fewer than in the previous election. Of note, in the seat of Hawick Burghs, writer Arthur Conan Doyle once again unsuccessfully stood as a Liberal Unionist candidate, after having been defeated in 1900 in Edinburgh Central. The Liberal Unionists retained the seats of St Andrews Burghs, North Ayrshire, Glasgow Camlachie, Glasgow Tradeston, Edinburgh West.

However, much like the Conservative party, the Liberal Unionists suffered several losses. It lost Orkney and Shetland, Sutherland, Inverness Burghs, East Aberdeenshire, West Perthshire, Falkirk Burghs, South Ayrshire, Glasgow St Rollox, Partick, Edinburgh South, Dumfriesshire and Peebles and Selkirk.

The Liberal Unionists, therefore, suffered 12 losses, reducing its number of seats from 17 to 5 across Scotland. Between the alliance of the parties, they held just 12 of the 72 seats in Scotland, down from its 38-seat high at the previous election, and held 38.2% of the vote share.

=== Labour Representation ===
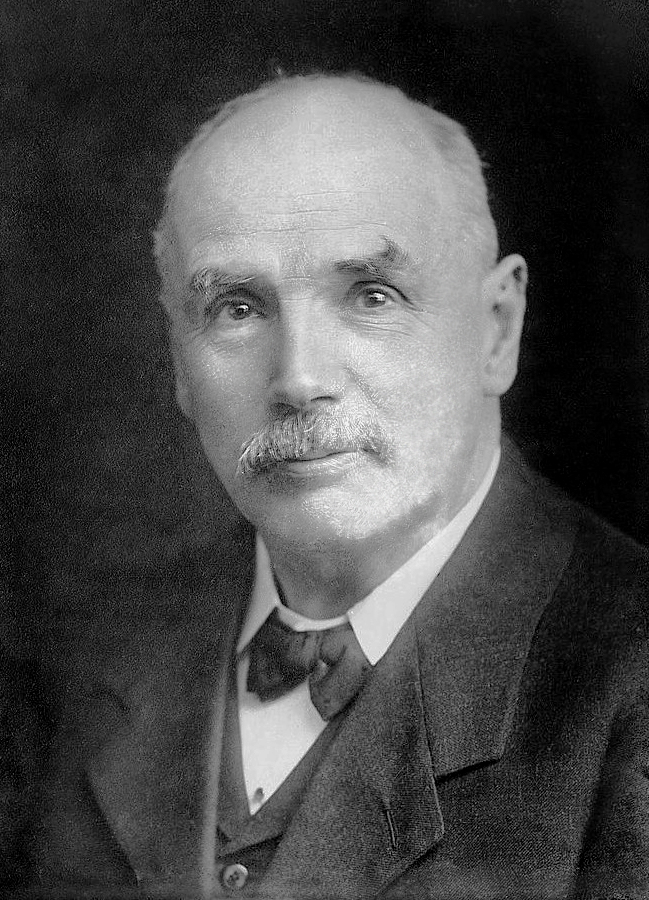
George Barnes

Amongst the several Labour representative and socialist parties that stood in the election, the Scottish Workers' Representation Committee (SWRC) stood five candidates: John Robertson in North East Lanarkshire, Joseph Sullivan in North West Lanarkshire, David Gilmour in Falkirk Burghs, James Brown in North Ayrshire, and Robert Smillie in Paisley. The candidates together won a total of 14,877 votes, but the group failed to win a single seat.

The Labour Representation Committee (which after the election would be renamed the Labour Party) was more successful, with the party standing only 4 candidates but picking up 2 Scottish seats. These were future Leader of the Labour Party George Barnes in Glasgow Blackfriars and Hutchesontown and Alexander Wilkie in one of the two seats in Dundee, with a 2.3% vote share when adjusted for the multi-member seat calculous. Alongside the 2 seats in Scotland, the Labour Representation Committee took a total of 29 seats across the UK.

Following the SWRC's failure to secure representation, the organisation decided to align itself more closely with the new Labour Party, eventually becoming the party's Scottish section.

== Seats summary ==
Below is a table summarising the total number of seats, gains and losses for each party in both the territorial county and burgh constituencies and the university constituencies.

| Party | Seats | | | | |
| Party | Total | Gains | Losses | Net | Of all (%) |
|---|---|---|---|---|---|
| Liberal | 58 | 27 | 3 | ▲24 | 80.6 |
| Conservative-Liberal Unionist | 12 | 2 | 28 | ▼26 | 16.7 |
| Conservative | 7 | 2 | 16 | ▼14 | 9.7 |
| Liberal Unionist | 5 | 0 | 12 | ▼12 | 6.9 |
| Labour Repr. Cmte. | 2 | New | | ▲2 | 2.8 |
| Total | 72 | | | | |

== County and burgh results ==
| Party | Seats | | | | | Aggregate votes | | |
| Party | Total | Gains | Losses | Net | Of total (%) | Total | Of total (%) (Note: Adjusted for multi-member constituencies.) | Change (%) |
|---|---|---|---|---|---|---|---|---|
| Liberal | 58 | 27 | 3 | ▲24 | 82.9 | 336,400 | 56.4 | ▲6.2 |
| Conservative-Liberal Unionist | 10 | 2 | 28 | ▼26 | 14.3 | 225,802 | 38.2 | ▼10.8 |
| Conservative | 5 | 2 | 16 | ▼14 | 7.1 | 143,052 | 24.3 | ▼0.6 |
| Liberal Unionist | 5 | 0 | 12 | ▼12 | 7.1 | 82,750 | 13.9 | ▼10.2 |
| Labour Repr. Cmte. | 2 | New | | ▲2 | 2.9 | 16,897 | 2.3 | New |
| Scottish Workers' | 0 | 0 | 0 | Steady | — | 14,877 | 2.5 | ▲1.9 |
| Social Democratic Federation | 0 | New | | | — | 1,935 | 0.3 | New |
| Musical Copyright | 0 | New | | | — | 758 | 0.1 | New |
| Fiscal Reform | 0 | New | | | — | 245 | 0.0 | New |
| Total | 70 | | | 0 | 100.0 | 596,914 | 100.0 | 0.0 |
| Registered voters, and turnout | | | | | | 721,261 (Note: Electorate in contested constituencies. The total electorate was 728,725.) | 80.9 | ▲5.6 |

=== Popular vote ===
Popular vote
| Liberal | 56.4% |
| Conservative | 24.3% |
| Liberal Unionist | 13.9% |
| Scottish Workers | 2.5% |
| Labour R. C. | 2.3% |
| Others | 0.6% |

Popular vote (alliances)
| Liberal | 56.4% |
| Con-LU | 38.2% |
| Scottish Workers | 2.5% |
| Labour R. C. | 2.3% |
| Others | 0.6% |

=== Parliament seats ===
Parliamentary seats
| Liberal | 80.6% |
| Conservative | 9.7% |
| Liberal Unionist | 6.9% |
| Labour R. C. | 2.8% |

Parliamentary seats (alliances)
| Liberal | 80.6% |
| Con-LU | 16.7% |
| Labour R. C. | 2.8% |

== University constituency results ==
The two university constituencies each elected an additional member to the house. Both seats were uncontested at the previous election, with the winning candidates having been elected unopposed.

=== Edinburgh and St Andrews Universities ===
General election 1906: Edinburgh and St Andrews Universities
| Party | Candidate | Votes | % | ±% |
|---|---|---|---|---|
| Conservative | John Batty Tuke | 4,893 | 67.9 | N/A |
| Free Trader | John Strachey | 2,310 | 32.1 | N/A |
| Majority | | 2,583 | 35.8 | N/A |
| Turnout | | 7,203 | 64.7 | N/A |
| Registered electors | | 11,131 | | |
| Conservative hold | | Swing | N/A | |

=== Glasgow and Aberdeen Universities ===
General election 1906: Glasgow and Aberdeen Universities
| Party | Candidate | Votes | % | ±% |
|---|---|---|---|---|
| Conservative | Henry Craik | 3,543 | 49.0 | N/A |
| Liberal | Alexander Murison | 2,450 | 33.9 | New |
| Free Trader | W.R. Smith | 1,240 | 17.1 | N/A |
| Majority | | 1,093 | 15.1 | N/A |
| Turnout | | 7,233 | 68.6 | N/A |
| Registered electors | | 10,545 | | |
| Conservative hold | | Swing | N/A | |

== See also ==
- 1906 United Kingdom general election in England
- 1906 United Kingdom general election in Ireland
- 1906 United Kingdom general election in Wales
- List of United Kingdom Parliament constituencies (1885–1918) by region
