= 2024 United Kingdom general election in England =

- 4 July 2024

All 543 English seats in the House of Commons
- Turnout: 60.1% (▼7.4 pp)
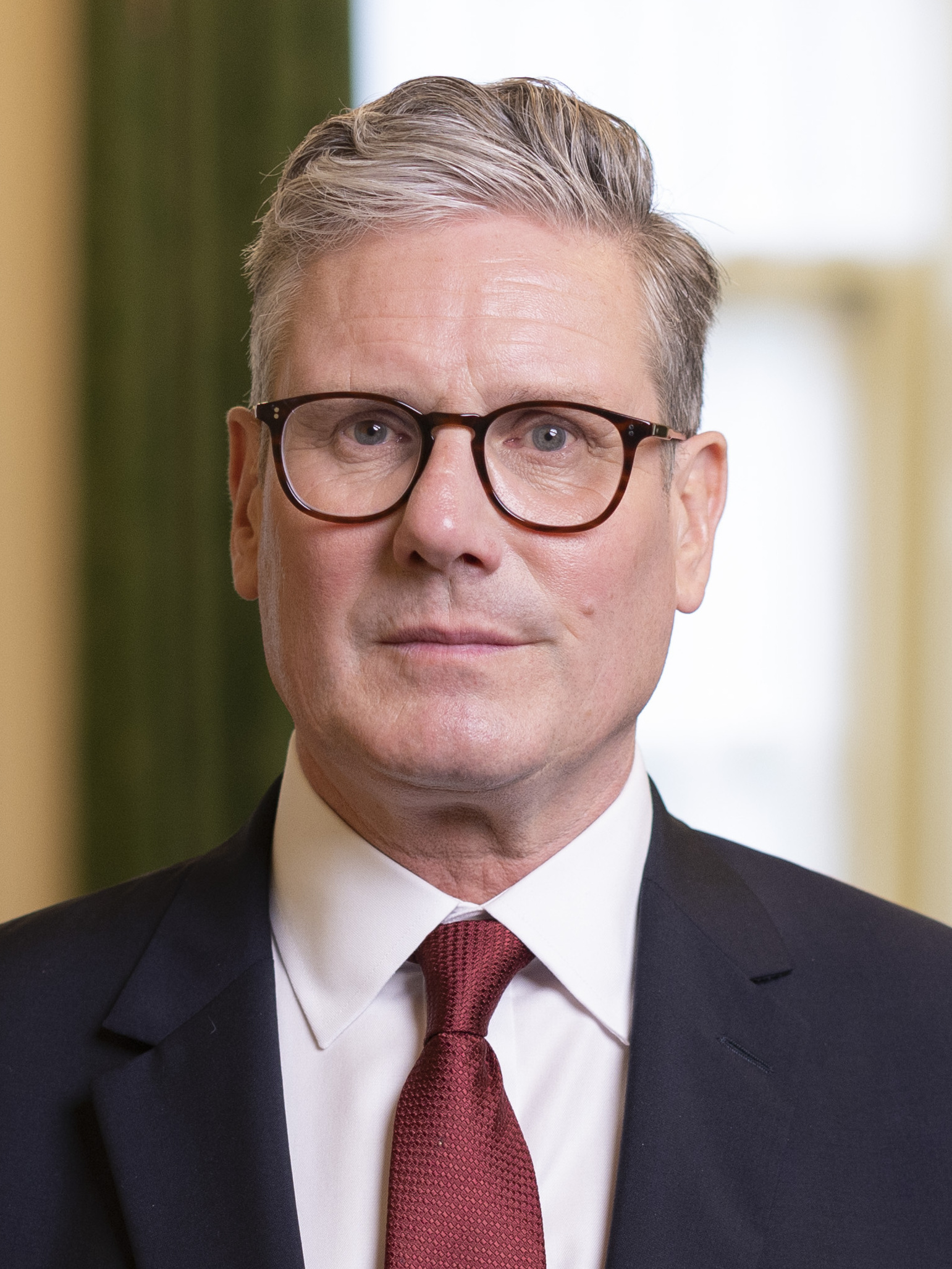

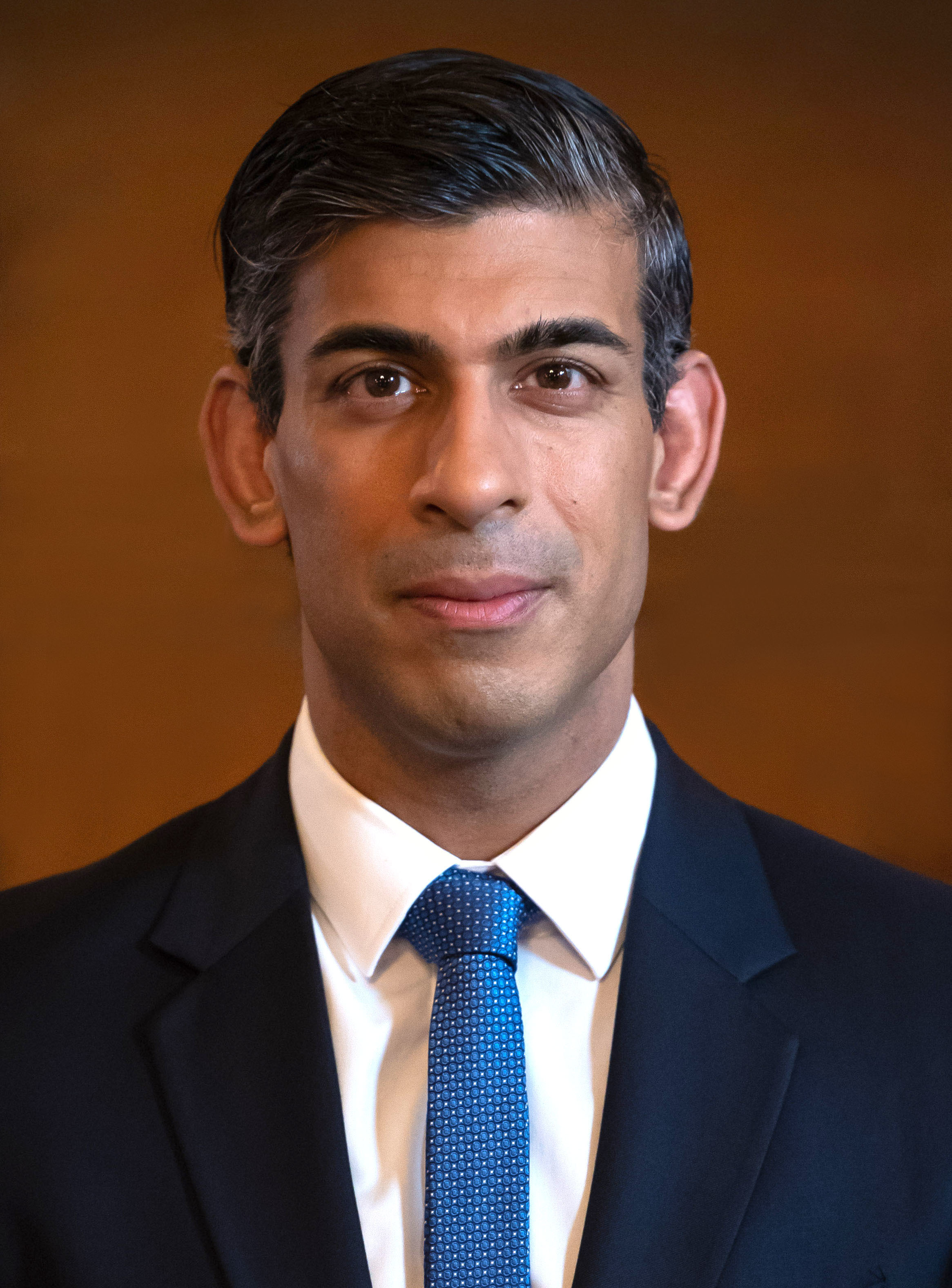

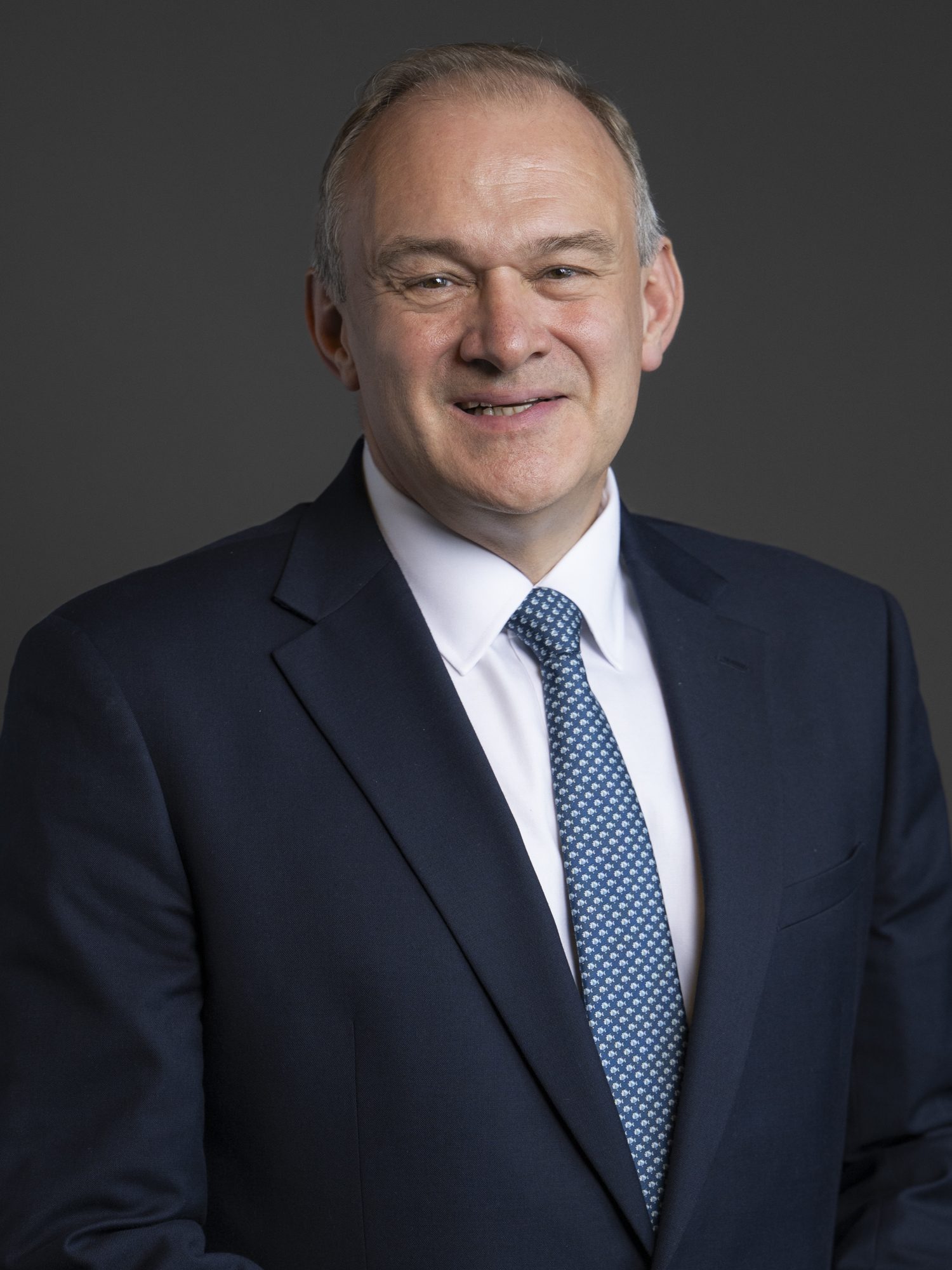

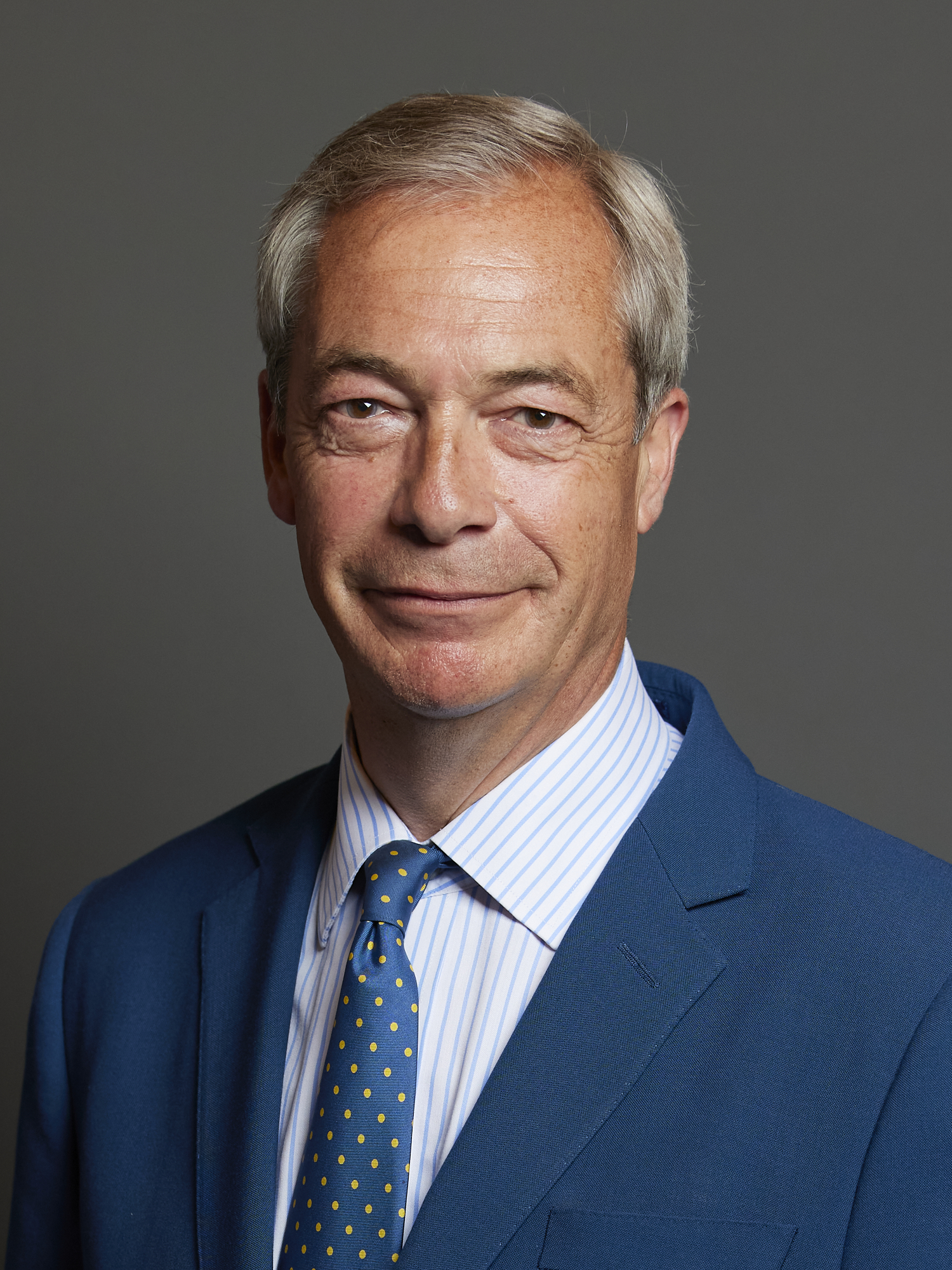

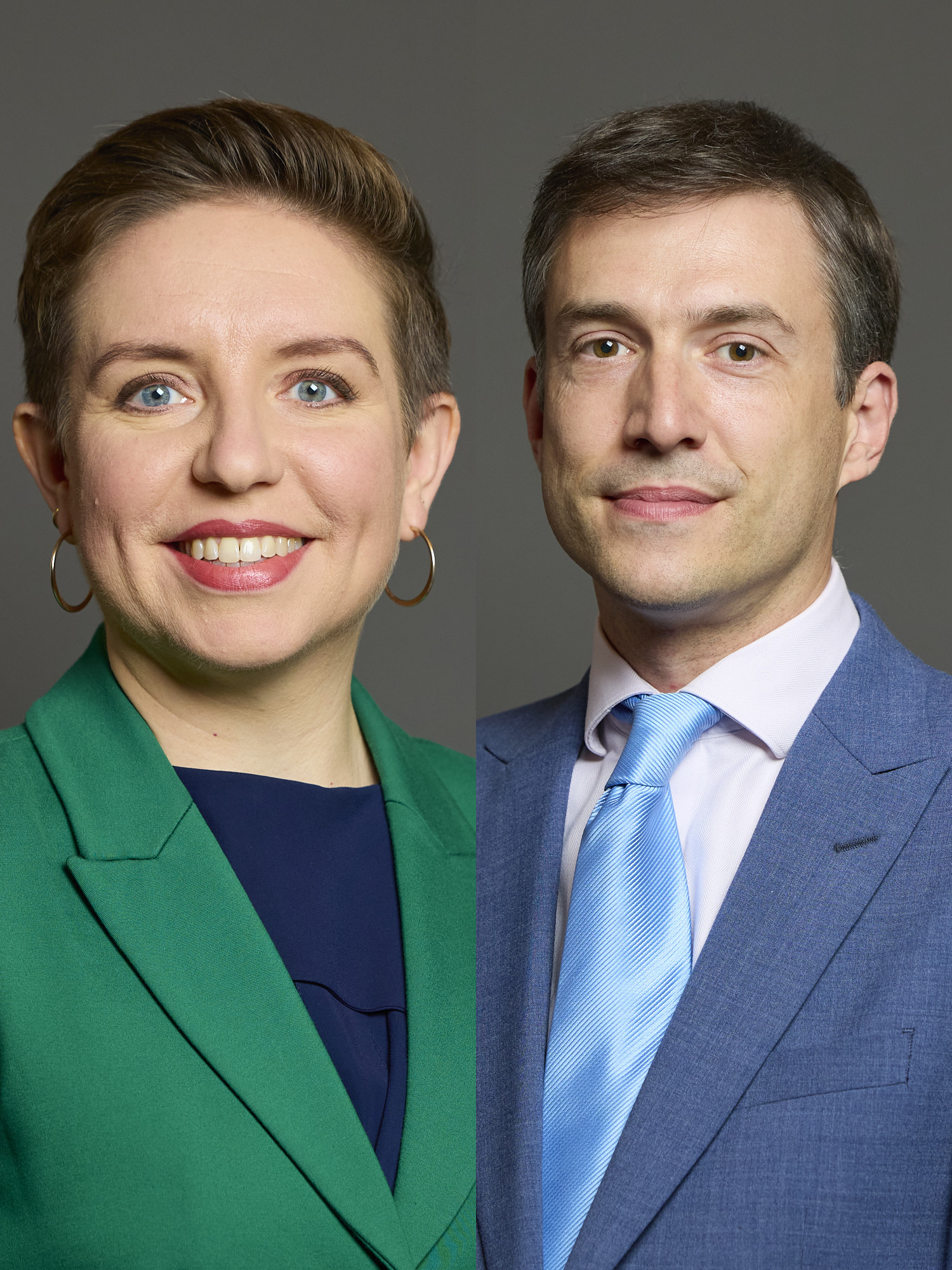

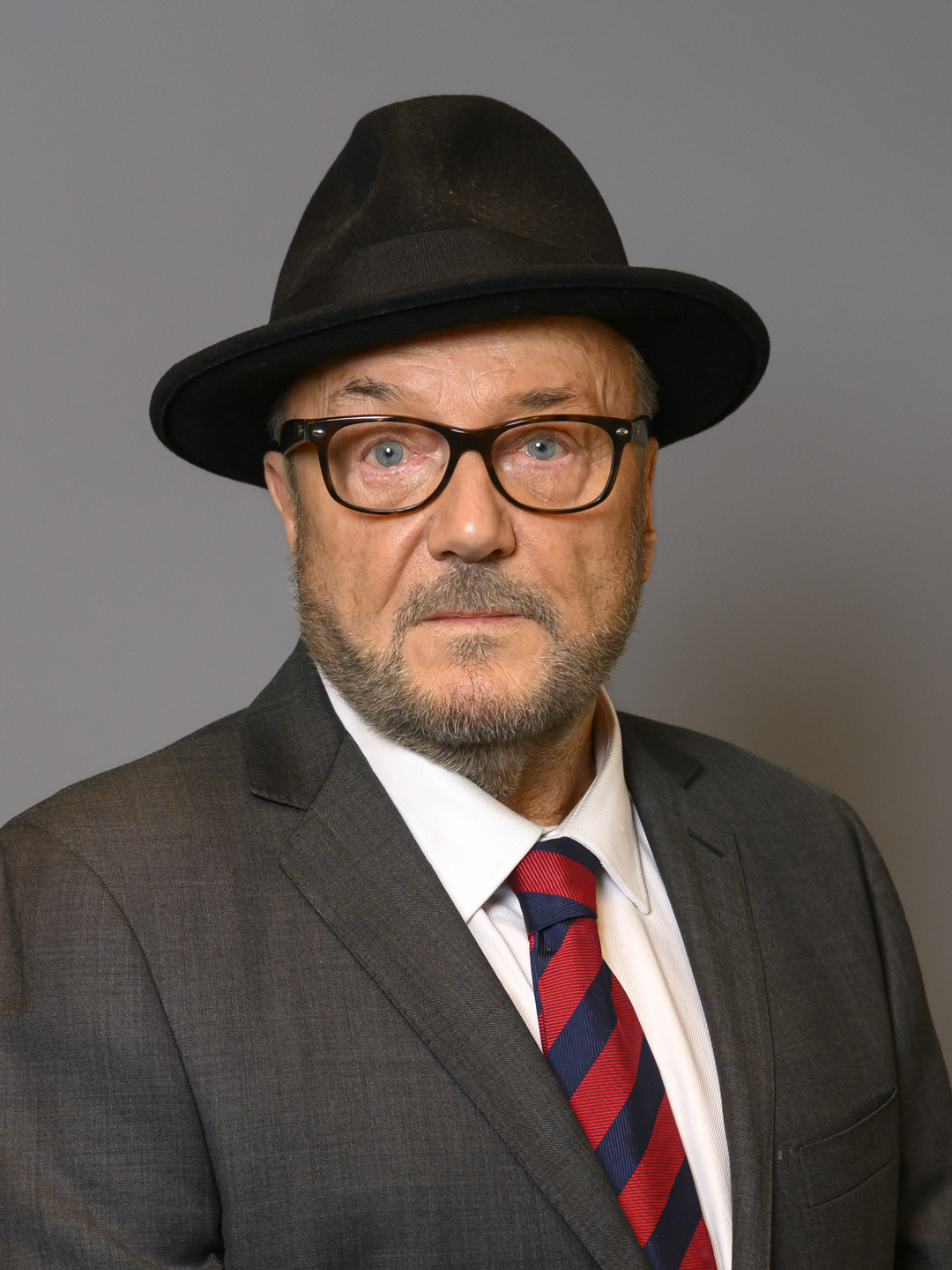
	First party	Second party	Third party
Leader	Keir Starmer	Rishi Sunak	Ed Davey
Party	Labour	Conservative	Liberal Democrats
Leader since	4 April 2020	24 October 2022	27 August 2020
Leader's seat	Holborn and St Pancras	Richmond and Northallerton	Kingston and Surbiton
Last election	179 seats, 33.9%	349 seats, 47.2%	7 seats, 12.4%
Seats before	184	331	11
Seats won	347*	116	65
Seat change	▲166	▼229	▲59
Popular vote	8,369,183	6,281,025	3,199,004
Percentage	34.4%	25.9%	13.2%
Swing	▲0.5 pp	▼21.3 pp	▲0.8 pp
	Fourth party	Fifth party	Sixth party
Leader	Nigel Farage	Carla Denyer & Adrian Ramsay	George Galloway
Party	Reform	Green	Workers Party
Leader since	3 June 2024	1 October 2021	8 December 2019
Leader's seat	Ran in Clacton (won)	Ran in Bristol Central and Waveney Valley (won)	Ran in Rochdale (lost)
Last election	0 seats, 2.0%	1 seat, 3.0%	Did not stand
Seats before	1	1	1
Seats won	5	4	0
Seat change	▲5	▲3	New
Popular vote	3,726,613	1,781,462	208,292
Percentage	15.3%	7.3%	0.9%
Swing	▲13.3 pp (Note: Compared to the Brexit Party)	▲4.3 pp	New
- *Seat figure does not include Speaker of the House of Commons Lindsay Hoyle, who was included in the Labour seat total by some media outlets.

On 4 July 2024, the 2024 United Kingdom general election was held in England, to elect all 650 members of the House of Commons, with 543 constituencies being in England.

== Electoral system ==
The election was fought under the boundaries created by the 2023 Periodic Review of Westminster constituencies. Due to population growth, England elected 10 more MPs than in 2019. The North East, North West, and West Midlands lost seats, while the East Midlands, East, London, South East, and South West gained seats.

== Candidates ==
Below is a table summarising the candidates of the 2024 general election in England, showing parties that stood 10 or more candidates each.

Affiliation	Candidates
Labour Party	542
Green Party of England and Wales	542
Conservative and Unionist Party	541
Liberal Democrats	541
Reform UK	521
Workers Party of Britain	146
Social Democratic Party	120
Trade Unionist and Socialist Coalition	34
Heritage Party	34
Yorkshire Party	27
Rejoin EU	26
Christian Peoples Alliance	22
UK Independence Party	20
Official Monster Raving Loony Party	20
Party of Women	16
English Democrats	15
Climate Party	12
Liberal Party	11
Hampshire Independents	10
Others	520
Total	3,720

== Analysis ==
At a turnout of 60.1% in England, this was the lowest turnout for the a general election since the 2001 general election, where 59.2% of the electorate voted. Similarly low English turnouts were recorded in the 2005 general election at 61.3% and the 1918 general election, wherein 55.7% voted but with not all seats contested.

The Labour Party won the majority of seats in England for the first time since 2005, with a net gain of 166 seats for a total of 348. Labour won the most seats in every region of England for the first time, Labour also won the most votes in all but two regions, coming second behind the Conservatives in South East England and third behind the Conservatives and Liberal Democrats in South West England. Every Labour gain in England was from the Conservatives compared to 2019, this does not include seats that Labour lost due to defections and by-elections during the Parliament but regained in this election, such as Rochdale from the Workers Party. Labour's seven losses were all in England, five to independents including former leader Jeremy Corbyn in Islington North, one to the Green Party in Bristol Central and one to the Conservative Party in Leicester East. The Co-operative Party, which is in an electoral pact with Labour, won 38 seats, its best ever showing in England. All of its candidates and MP's are labelled as Labour-Co-op, and simply included in Labour's total.

The Conservative Party had their worst ever result in England, being reduced to 116 seats following a net loss of 229, surpassing its result in 1906. The Conservatives lost the majority of their seats in every region of England, and lost most of their 'red wall' seats which they had gained from Labour in 2019, for example only one Conservative MP was elected in North East England (Stockton West), and only three Conservative MPs were elected in North West England. Nearly a third of Conservative losses in England were to the Liberal Democrats, particularly in South East England and South West England. Both Reform UK and the Green Party also gained from the Conservatives. Liz Truss lost her own seat of South West Norfolk to Labour. The only Conservative gain in England was Leicester East, where a split Labour vote between the official Labour candidate and former Labour MPs Claudia Webbe and Keith Vaz depressed the Labour vote.

The Liberal Democrats had their best ever result in England, and the best result for any liberal party in England since 1923, they won 65 seats, 59 gains from 2019. Every Liberal Democrat gain was from the Conservatives, and were mainly in the south of England. The Liberal Democrats came second in terms of votes and seats in South West England, outpolling Labour on votes and the Conservatives on seats. The only regions in England without any Liberal Democrat MPs are East Midlands and North East England.

Reform UK won five seats, all in England, three in East of England and two in East Midlands, all five were gains from the Conservatives. Party leader Nigel Farage was elected in Clacton, former leader Richard Tice was elected in Boston and Skegness, and Lee Anderson who had defected from the Conservatives, was re-elected in Ashfield, the other two Reform seats were Great Yarmouth (Rupert Lowe) and South Basildon and East Thurrock (James McMurdock). All five seats were strongly pro-Brexit, each voting more than 70% to Leave in 2016. Reform finished in third place in terms of votes in East of England, North East England (just 0.4% behind the Conservatives), North West England, East Midlands, West Midlands and Yorkshire and The Humber. Most of the seats where Reform UK came second were in England, particularly in the north behind Labour and ahead of the Conservatives.

The Green Party had their best ever result. They won four seats, Siân Berry defended Brighton Pavilion after Caroline Lucas did not stand again, while co-leader Carla Denyer gained Bristol Central from Labour, co-leader Adrian Ramsay gained Waveney Valley from the Conservatives, and Ellie Chowns gained North Herefordshire from the Conservatives. The Green Party therefore has MPs across four English regions: one each in East of England, South East England, South West England and West Midlands. The Green Party also came second in many safe Labour seats for the first time, including most seats in central London, and every other seat in Bristol.

Five independent MPs were elected in England, the highest number of independent MPs since 1945. Former Labour leader Jeremy Corbyn held his seat in Islington North, after being expelled from the party. The other four independent gains were in previously safe Labour seats: Blackburn, Birmingham Perry Barr, Dewsbury and Batley and Leicester South. Each constituency had a large Muslim population, and these independents were elected in opposition to Labour's stance on the Israel-Gaza war.

The Workers Party lost their 1-seat, that they had won in a by-election a few months prior to the general election.

== Results ==
Below is a table summarising the results of the 2024 general election in England, showing all parties above 500 votes.

Party	Seats					Aggregate votes		
Party	Total	Gains	Losses	Net	Of all (%)	Total	Of all (%)	Change (%)
Labour	347	173	7	▲166	63.9	8,369,183	34.4	▲0.5
Conservative	116	1	230	▼229	21.4	6,281,025	25.9	▼21.3
Reform	5	5	0	▲5	0.9	3,726,613	15.3	▲13.3
Liberal Democrats	65	59	0	▲59	12.0	3,199,004	13.2	▲0.8
Green	4	3	0	▲3	0.7	1,781,462	7.3	▲4.3
Independent	5	5	0	▲5	0.9	513,065	2.1	▲1.4
Workers Party	0	New			—	208,292	0.9	New
SDP	0	0	0	Steady	—	33,385	0.1	▲0.1
Speaker	1	0	0	Steady	0.2	25,238	0.1	Steady
Yorkshire	0	0	0	Steady	—	17,236	0.1	Steady
Ind. Network	0	0	0	Steady	—	13,663	0.1	Steady
TUSC	0	Did not stand in 2019			—	10,846	0.0	—N/a
Rejoin EU	0	New			—	9,288	0.0	New
NIP	0	New			—	7,180	0.0	New
Ashfield Ind.	0	0	0	Steady	—	6,276	0.0	▼0.1
Liberal	0	0	0	Steady	—	5,894	0.0	Steady
UKIP	0	0	0	Steady	—	5,617	0.0	Steady
CPA	0	0	0	Steady	—	5,604	0.0	Steady
Heritage	0	New			—	5,441	0.0	New
Monster Raving Loony	0	0	0	Steady	—	5,421	0.0	Steady
English Democrat	0	0	0	Steady	—	5,182	0.0	Steady
Party of Women	0	New			—	5,077	0.0	New
Lincolnshire Independent	0	0	0	Steady	—	4,277	0.0	Steady
One Leicester	0	New			—	4,008	0.0	New
Community Independents	0	New			—	3,294	0.0	New
Swale Ind.	0	New			—	3,238	0.0	New
Hampshire Ind.	0	New			—	2,872	0.0	New
Democracy for Chorley	0	New			—	2,424	0.0	New
Socialist Labour	0	0	0	Steady	—	2,397	0.0	Steady
IOA	0	New			—	2,381	0.0	New
Alliance	0	New			—	1,924	0.0	New
Climate	0	New			—	1,863	0.0	New
British Democrats	0	Did not stand in 2019			—	1,860	0.0	—N/a
ADF	0	New			—	1,769	0.0	New
Communist	0	Did not stand in 2019			—	1,585	0.0	—N/a
North East	0	0	0	Steady	—	1,581	0.0	Steady
English Constitution	0	New			—	1,563	0.0	New
Animal Welfare	0	0	0	Steady	—	1,486	0.0	Steady
True & Fair	0	New			—	1,440	0.0	New
Consensus	0	Did not stand in 2019			—	1,289	0.0	—N/a
Workers Revolutionary	0	0	0	Steady	—	1,190	0.0	Steady
KIRG	0	New			—	1,177	0.0	New
Ind. Alliance	0	New			—	926	0.0	New
Freedom Alliance	0	New			—	782	0.0	New
Southend Confelicity	0	New			—	750	0.0	New
Women's Equality	0	0	0	Steady	—	739	0.0	Steady
PIP	0	New			—	733	0.0	New
Shared Ground	0	New			—	664	0.0	New
Transform	0	New			—	595	0.0	New
Putting Crewe First	0	New			—	588	0.0	New
Peace	0	0	0	Steady	—	531	0.0	Steady
Taking the Initiative	0	New			—	503	0.0	New
Others	0	—N/a			—	5,193	0.0	—N/a
Total	543			0	100.0	24,295,614	100.0	0.0
Registered voters, and turnout						40,418,601	60.1	▼7.4

Aggregate votes
Labour	34.4%
Conservative	25.9%
Reform UK	15.3%
Liberal Democrats	13.2%
Green	7.3%
Independent	2.1%
Other	1.9%

Members of parliament
Labour	64.1%
Conservative	21.4%
Liberal Democrats	12.0%
Reform UK	0.9%
Independent	0.9%
Green	0.7%

== By region ==
=== East of England ===
Results in the East of England

The East of England elected 61 MPs, three more than the 58 elected in 2019 general election. The election was fought under the boundaries created by the 2023 Periodic Review of Westminster constituencies. In the 2019 general election, the Conservatives won 52 seats in the region. Labour won five and the Liberal Democrats won one (St Albans).

Party	Seats					Aggregate votes		
Party	Total	Gains	Losses	Net	Of all (%)	Total	Of all (%)	Change (%)
Conservative	23	0	29	▼29	37.7	869,447	30.6	▼26.5
Labour	27	22	0	▲22	44.3	834,896	29.4	▲5.0
Reform	3	3	0	▲3	4.9	496,237	17.5	▲17.1
Liberal Democrats	7	6	0	▲6	11.5	375,642	13.2	▼0.2
Green	1	1	0	▲1	1.6	195,665	6.9	▲3.9
Others	0	0	0	Steady	0.0	67,432	2.4	▲0.7
Total	61			▲3		2,839,319		

=== East Midlands ===
The East Midlands elected 47 MPs, which is one more than the 46 elected in 2019 general election. The election was fought under the boundaries created by the 2023 Periodic Review of Westminster constituencies. In the 2019 general election, the Conservatives won 38 seats in the region and Labour won 8.

Party	Seats					Aggregate votes		
Party	Total	Gains	Losses	Net	Of all (%)	Total	Of all (%)	Change (%)
Labour	29	23	2	▲21	61.7	753,723	35.3	▲3.6
Conservative	15	1	24	▼23	31.9	626,568	29.4	▼25.4
Reform	2	2	0	▲2	4.3	403,470	18.9	▲17.4
Liberal Democrats	0	0	0	Steady	0.0	136,929	6.4	▼1.4
Green	0	0	0	Steady	0.0	133,447	6.3	▲3.7
Others	1	1	0	▲1	2.1	79,524	3.7	▲2.1
Total	47			▲1		2,133,661		

=== London ===
Results by constituency

London elected 75 MPs, which is 2 more than the 73 elected in 2019 general election. The election was fought under the boundaries created by the 2023 Periodic Review of Westminster constituencies.

Party	Seats					Aggregate votes		
Party	Total	Gains	Losses	Net	Of all (%)	Total	Of all (%)	Change (%)
Labour	59	11	1	▲10	78.7	1,432,622	43.0	▼5.2
Conservative	9	0	12	▼12	12.0	685,082	20.5	▼11.5
Liberal Democrats	6	3	0	▲3	8.0	367,424	11.0	▼3.9
Green	0	0	0	Steady	0.0	335,479	10.1	▲7.0
Reform	0	0	0	Steady	0.0	289,459	8.7	▲7.3
Others	1	1	0	▲1	1.3	223,916	6.7	▲6.2
Total	75			▲2		3,333,982		

=== North East England ===
North East England elected 27 MPs, which is two fewer than the 29 elected in 2019 general election. The election was fought under the boundaries created by the 2023 Periodic Review of Westminster constituencies. In the 2019 general election, Labour won 19 seats and the Conservatives won 10.

Party	Seats					Aggregate votes		
Party	Total	Gains	Losses	Net	Of all (%)	Total	Of all (%)	Change (%)
Labour	26	7	0	▲7	96.3	504,569	45.4	▲2.8
Conservative	1	0	9	▼9	3.7	224,584	20.2	▼18.0
Reform	0	0	0	Steady	0.0	220,875	19.9	▲11.8
Green	0	0	0	Steady	0.0	66,680	6.0	▲3.6
Liberal Democrats	0	0	0	Steady	0.0	65,385	5.9	▼0.9
Others	0	0	0	Steady	0.0	29,447	2.6	▲0.7
Total	27			▼2		1,111,540		

=== North West England ===
North West England elected 73 MPs, which is 2 less than the 75 elected in 2019 general election. The election was fought under the boundaries created by the 2023 Periodic Review of Westminster constituencies. In the 2019 general election, the Conservatives won 32 seats in the region and Labour won 41.

Party	Seats					Aggregate votes		
Party	Total	Gains	Losses	Net	Of all (%)	Total	Of all (%)	Change (%)
Labour	65	25	1	▲24	87.7	1,361,196	44.0	▼2.5
Conservative	3	0	29	▼29	4.1	581,099	18.8	▼18.7
Reform	0	0	0	Steady	0.0	512,115	16.6	▲12.7
Liberal Democrats	3	2	0	▲2	4.1	242,662	7.8	Steady
Green	0	0	0	Steady	0.0	217,092	7.0	▲4.6
Speaker	1	0	0	Steady	1.2	25,238	0.8	Steady
Others	1	1	0	▲1	2.7	178,298	5.8	▲4.0
Total	73			▼2		3,092,462		

=== South East England ===
South East England elected 91 MPs, which is 7 more than the 84 elected in 2019 general election. The election was fought under the boundaries created by the 2023 Periodic Review of Westminster constituencies. In the 2019 general election, the Conservatives won 74 seats in the region and Labour won 8. The Liberal Democrats held Oxford West and Abingdon and the Greens held Brighton Pavilion.

Party	Seats					Aggregate votes		
Party	Total	Gains	Losses	Net	Of all (%)	Total	Of all (%)	Change (%)
Conservative	30	0	44	▼44	31.9	1,332,755	30.6	▼23.4
Labour	36	28	0	▲28	39.6	1,067,897	24.5	▲2.4
Liberal Democrats	24	23	0	▲23	26.4	951,222	21.9	▲3.6
Reform	0	0	0	Steady	0.0	609,281	14.0	▲13.7
Green	1	0	0	Steady	1.1	299,665	6.9	▲2.9
Others	0	0	0	Steady	0.0	90,596	2.1	▲0.7
Total	91			▲7		4,351,416		

=== South West England ===
South West England elected 58 MPs, which is 3 more than the 55 elected in 2019 general election. The election was fought under the boundaries created by the 2023 Periodic Review of Westminster constituencies. In the 2019 general election, the Conservatives won 48 seats in the region and Labour won 6. The Liberal Democrats held Bath.

Party	Seats					Aggregate votes		
Party	Total	Gains	Losses	Net	Of all (%)	Total	Of all (%)	Change (%)
Conservative	11	0	37	▼37	19.0	785,672	28.2	▼24.7
Liberal Democrats	22	21	0	▲21	37.9	686,921	24.7	▲6.5
Labour	24	19	1	▲18	41.4	682,080	24.5	▲1.1
Reform	0	0	0	Steady	0.0	384,240	13.8	▲13.4
Green	1	1	0	▲1	1.7	206,780	7.4	▲3.7
Others	0	0	0	Steady	0.0	39,737	1.4	▼0.1
Total	58			▲3		2,785,430		

=== West Midlands ===
The West Midlands elected 57 MPs, which is 2 fewer than the 59 elected in 2019 general election. The election was fought under the boundaries created by the 2023 Periodic Review of Westminster constituencies.

Party	Seats					Aggregate votes		
Party	Total	Gains	Losses	Net	Of all (%)	Total	Of all (%)	Change (%)
Labour	38	24	1	▲23	66.7	824,433	34.0	▲0.1
Conservative	15	0	29	▼29	26.3	669,368	27.6	▼25.8
Reform	0	0	0	Steady	0.0	439,278	18.1	▲16.8
Liberal Democrats	2	2	0	▲2	3.5	214,493	8.8	▲1.0
Green	1	1	0	▲1	1.8	159,140	6.6	▲3.6
Others	1	1	0	▲1	1.8	119,145	4.9	▲4.4
Total	57			▼2		2,425,857		

=== Yorkshire and the Humber ===
Yorkshire and the Humber elected 54 MPs, which is the same amount elected in 2019 general election. The election was fought under the boundaries created by the 2023 Periodic Review of Westminster constituencies. In the 2019 general election, the Conservatives won 26 seats in the region and Labour won 28.

Party	Seats					Aggregate votes		
Party	Total	Gains	Losses	Net	Of all (%)	Total	Of all (%)	Change (%)
Labour	43	16	1	▲15	79.6	907,767	40.9	▲2.0
Conservative	9	0	17	▼17	16.7	506,450	22.8	▼20.3
Reform	0	0	0	Steady	0.0	371,658	16.7	▲10.8
Green	0	0	0	Steady	0.0	167,514	7.5	▲5.3
Liberal Democrats	1	1	0	▲1	1.9	158,326	7.1	▼0.9
Others	1	1	0	▲1	1.9	110,232	5.0	▲3.1
Total	54			Steady		2,221,947		

== By county ==
=== Avon ===
Party	Seats					Aggregate Votes		
Party	Total	Gains	Losses	Net	Of all (%)	Total	Of all (%)	Change (%)
Labour	8	4	0	▲4	72.7	189,007	36.2	▲0.5
Liberal Democrats	2	1	0	▲1	18.2	71,768	13.7	▼2.1
Green	1	1	0	▲1	9.1	87,204	16.7	▲11.1
Conservative	0	0	6	▼6	0.0	110,554	21.2	▼20.5
Reform	0	0	0	Steady	0.0	56,721	10.9	▲10.0
Others	0	0	0	Steady	0.0	6,951	1.3	▲1.0
Total	11			Steady		522,205		

=== Bedfordshire ===
Party	Seats					Aggregate Votes		
Party	Total	Gains	Losses	Net	Of all (%)	Total	Of all (%)	Change (%)
Labour	5	2	0	▲2	71.4	114,813	36.8	▲0.5
Conservative	2	0	1	▼1	28.6	88,794	28.0	▼20.5
Reform	0	0	0	Steady	0.0	45,831	14.4	▲10.0
Liberal Democrats	0	0	0	Steady	0.0	29,346	9.2	▼2.1
Green	0	0	0	Steady	0.0	17,092	5.4	▲11.1
Workers Party	0	New			—	8,020	2.5	New
Others	0	0	0	Steady	0.0	13,447	4.2	▲1.0
Total	7			▲1		317,343		

=== Berkshire ===
Party	Seats					Aggregate Votes		
Party	Total	Gains	Losses	Net	Of all (%)	Total	Of all (%)	Change (%)
Labour	5	3	0	▲3	55.6	108,614	25.7	▼0.4
Liberal Democrats	3	3	0	▲3	33.3	98,858	23.2	▲3.6
Conservative	1	0	5	▼5	11.1	132,771	31.4	▼18.7
Reform	0	0	0	Steady	0.0	36,252	8.6	▲8.1
Green	0	0	0	Steady	0.0	25,994	6.1	▲3.0
Others	0	0	0	Steady	0.0	20,886	4.9	▲4.5
Total	9			▲1		423,375		

=== Buckinghamshire ===
Party	Seats					Aggregate Votes		
Party	Total	Gains	Losses	Net	Of all (%)	Total	Of all (%)	Change (%)
Labour	5	5	0	▲5	62.5	108,134	27.5	▲2.1
Conservative	2	0	5	▼5	25.0	126,497	32.2	▼20.5
Liberal Democrats	1	1	0	▲1	12.5	79,011	20.1	▲6.4
Reform	0	0	0	Steady	0.0	49,683	12.6	▲12.3
Green	0	0	0	Steady	0.0	20,433	5.2	▲2.3
Workers Party	0	New			—	4,326	1.1	New
Others	0	0	0	Steady	0.0	4,972	1.3	▼3.7
Total	8			▲1		393,056		

=== Cambridgeshire ===
Party	Seats					Aggregate Votes		
Party	Total	Gains	Losses	Net	Of all (%)	Total	Of all (%)	Change (%)
Labour	3	2	0	▲2	37.5	94,767	25.4	▲1.1
Liberal Democrats	3	3	0	▲3	37.5	83,359	22.4	▲0.9
Conservative	2	0	4	▼4	25.0	114,186	31.4	▼19.5
Reform	0	0	0	Steady	0.0	41,173	11.0	▲10.2
Green	0	0	0	Steady	0.0	25,065	6.7	▲4.3
Others	0	0	0	Steady	0.0	14,115	3.8	▲2.9
Total	8			▲1		372,665		

=== Cheshire ===
Party	Seats					Aggregate Votes		
Party	Total	Gains	Losses	Net	Of all (%)	Total	Of all (%)	Change (%)
Labour	10	5	0	▲5	83.3	252,726	45.9	▲6.4
Conservative	2	0	4	▼4	16.7	135,749	24.7	▼21.7
Reform	0	0	0	Steady	0.0	90,090	16.4	▲13.9
Liberal Democrats	0	0	0	Steady	0.0	34,774	6.3	▼2.7
Green	0	0	0	Steady	0.0	29,250	5.3	▲2.9
Others	0	0	0	Steady	0.0	7,970	1.4	▲1.2
Total	12			▲1		550,558		

=== Cleveland ===
Party	Seats					Aggregate Votes		
Party	Total	Gains	Losses	Net	Of all (%)	Total	Of all (%)	Change (%)
Labour	5	2	0	▲2	83.3	100,144	43.1	▲2.5
Conservative	1	0	2	▼2	16.7	70,935	30.5	▼13.0
Reform	0	0	0	Steady	0.0	39,000	16.8	▲9.1
Green	0	0	0	Steady	0.0	8,472	3.6	▲2.7
Liberal Democrats	0	0	0	Steady	0.0	7,519	3.2	▼0.9
Others	0	0	0	Steady	0.0	6,124	2.6	▼0.6
Total	6			Steady		232,194		

=== Cornwall ===
Party	Seats					Aggregate Votes		
Party	Total	Gains	Losses	Net	Of all (%)	Total	Of all (%)	Change (%)
Labour	4	4	0	▲4	66.7	77,517	26.4	▲3.3
Liberal Democrats	2	2	0	▲2	33.3	72,881	24.8	▲5.5
Conservative	0	0	6	▼6	0.0	76,817	26.2	▼27.6
Reform	0	0	0	Steady	0.0	48,574	16.6	New
Green	0	0	0	Steady	0.0	13,778	4.7	▲2.5
Others	0	0	0	Steady	0.0	3,740	1.3	▼0.3
Total	6			Steady		293,307		

=== County Durham ===
Party	Seats					Aggregate Votes		
Party	Total	Gains	Losses	Net	Of all (%)	Total	Of all (%)	Change (%)
Labour	6	3	0	▲3	100.0	104,518	43.7	▲3.3
Reform	0	0	0	Steady	0.0	54,168	22.6	▲14.2
Conservative	0	0	4	▼4	0.0	48,348	20.2	▼20.4
Liberal Democrats	0	0	0	Steady	0.0	15,538	6.5	▼0.5
Green	0	0	0	Steady	0.0	12,747	5.3	▲2.3
Others	0	0	0	Steady	0.0	3,848	1.6	Steady
Total	6			▼1		239,167		

=== Cumbria ===
Party	Seats					Aggregate Votes		
Party	Total	Gains	Losses	Net	Of all (%)	Total	Of all (%)	Change (%)
Labour	4	4	0	▲4	80.0	81,131	35.4	▲6.4
Liberal Democrats	1	0	0	Steady	10.0	41,654	18.2	▲3.8
Conservative	0	0	5	▼5	0.0	58,915	25.7	▼26.8
Reform	0	0	0	Steady	0.0	37,683	16.5	▲15.1
Green	0	0	0	Steady	0.0	7,811	3.4	▲1.9
Others	0	0	0	Steady	0.0	1,731	0.8	▼0.4
Total	5			▼1		228,925		

=== Derbyshire ===
Party	Seats					Aggregate Votes		
Party	Total	Gains	Losses	Net	Of all (%)	Total	Of all (%)	Change (%)
Labour	11	9	0	▲9	100.0	195,568	40.1	▲5.4
Conservative	0	0	9	▼9	0.0	133,262	27.3	▼25.0
Reform	0	0	0	Steady	0.0	94,292	19.3	▲16.6
Green	0	0	0	Steady	0.0	30,348	6.2	▲3.6
Liberal Democrats	0	0	0	Steady	0.0	24,897	5.1	▲2.1
Workers Party	0	New			—	5,603	1.1	New
Others	0	0	0	Steady	0.0	3,498	0.7	▲0.2
Total	11			Steady		487,468		

=== Devon ===
Party	Seats					Aggregate Votes		
Party	Total	Gains	Losses	Net	Of all (%)	Total	Of all (%)	Change (%)
Liberal Democrats	5	5	0	▲5	41.7	143,624	24.9	▲10.2
Conservative	4	0	6	▼6	33.3	165,316	28.7	▼25.2
Labour	3	1	0	▲1	25.0	135,300	23.5	▲0.7
Reform	0	0	0	Steady	0.0	85,711	14.9	New
Green	0	0	0	Steady	0.0	41,036	7.1	▲3.8
Others	0	0	0	Steady	0.0	4,690	0.8	▼3.8
Total	12			Steady		575,677		

=== Dorset ===
Party	Seats					Aggregate Votes		
Party	Total	Gains	Losses	Net	Of all (%)	Total	Of all (%)	Change (%)
Labour	4	4	0	▲4	50.0	82,652	21.9	▲3.5
Conservative	2	0	6	▼6	25.0	127,188	33.7	▼24.6
Liberal Democrats	2	2	0	▲2	25.0	95,463	25.3	▲6.4
Reform	0	0	0	Steady	0.0	45,367	12.0	New
Green	0	0	0	Steady	0.0	18,400	4.9	▲1.0
Others	0	0	0	Steady	0.0	8,287	2.2	▲1.7
Total	8			Steady		377,357		

=== East Sussex ===
Party	Seats					Aggregate Votes		
Party	Total	Gains	Losses	Net	Of all (%)	Total	Of all (%)	Change (%)
Labour	3	1	0	▲1	37.5	106,732	27.6	▲0.3
Conservative	2	0	3	▼3	25.0	88,069	22.8	▼21.4
Liberal Democrats	2	2	0	▲2	25.0	75,211	19.5	▲2.6
Green	1	0	0	Steady	12.5	60,012	15.5	▲5.4
Reform	0	0	0	Steady	0.0	44,040	11.4	▲10.3
Others	0	0	0	Steady	0.0	12,536	3.2	▲2.8
Total	8			Steady		386,600		

=== Essex ===
Party	Seats					Aggregate Votes		
Party	Total	Gains	Losses	Net	Of all (%)	Total	Of all (%)	Change (%)
Conservative	10	0	8	▼8	55.6	270,382	32.9	▼31.6
Labour	5	5	0	▲5	27.8	235,891	28.7	▲7.5
Reform	2	2	0	▲2	0.0	179,977	21.9	New
Liberal Democrats	1	1	0	▲1	5.6	78,238	9.5	▼1.1
Green	0	0	0	Steady	0.0	42,582	5.2	▲2.9
Others	0	0	0	Steady	0.0	14,054	1.7	▲0.3
Total	18			Steady		821,124		

=== Gloucestershire ===
Party	Seats					Aggregate Votes		
Party	Total	Gains	Losses	Net	Of all (%)	Total	Of all (%)	Change (%)
Liberal Democrats	3	3	0	▲3	42.3	93,112	26.6	▲9.5
Labour	3	3	0	▲3	42.3	77,973	22.3	▼0.6
Conservative	1	0	5	▼5	14.3	111,103	31.8	▼22.4
Reform	0	0	0	Steady	0.0	39,478	11.3	▲11.0
Green	0	0	0	Steady	0.0	23,559	6.7	▲1.8
Others	0	0	0	Steady	0.0	4,399	1.3	▲0.6
Total	7			▲1		349,624		

=== Greater London ===
Party	Seats					Aggregate Votes		
Party	Total	Gains	Losses	Net	Of all (%)	Total	Of all (%)	Change (%)
Labour	59	11	1	▲10	78.7	1,432,622	43.0	▼0.6
Conservative	9	0	12	▼12	12.0	685,082	20.6	▼22.4
Liberal Democrats	6	3	0	▲3	8.0	367,424	11.0	▲9.5
Green	0	0	0	Steady	0.0	334,791	10.0	▲1.8
Reform	0	0	0	Steady	0.0	289,459	8.7	▲11.0
Others	1	1	0	▲1	1.3	223,916	6.7	▲0.6
Total	75			▲2		3,333,294		

=== Greater Manchester ===
Party	Seats					Aggregate Votes		
Party	Total	Gains	Losses	Net	Of all (%)	Total	Of all (%)	Change (%)
Labour	25	7	0	▲7	92.6	471,074	42.8	▼5.1
Liberal Democrats	2	2	0	▲2	7.4	95,978	8.7	▼0.1
Reform	0	0	0	Steady	0.0	191,257	17.4	▲11.9
Conservative	0	0	0	▼9	0.0	173,735	15.8	▼19.1
Green	0	0	0	Steady	0.0	89,203	8.1	▲5.7
Others	0	0	0	Steady	0.0	79,496	7.2	▲6.7
Total	27			Steady		1,100,743		

=== Hampshire ===
Party	Seats					Aggregate Votes		
Party	Total	Gains	Losses	Net	Of all (%)	Total	Of all (%)	Change (%)
Conservative	9	0	7	▼7	50.0	273,242	32.4	▼24.7
Labour	6	4	0	▲4	33.3	209,643	24.8	▲4.7
Liberal Democrats	3	3	0	▲3	16.7	177,830	21.1	▲2.5
Reform	0	0	0	Steady	0.0	128,853	15.3	▲15.0
Green	0	0	0	Steady	0.0	45,751	5.4	▲2.1
Others	0	0	0	Steady	0.0	8,778	1.0	▲0.4
Total	18			Steady		844,097		

=== Herefordshire and Worcestershire ===
Party	Seats					Aggregate Votes		
Party	Total	Gains	Losses	Net	Of all (%)	Total	Of all (%)	Change (%)
Conservative	5	0	3	▼3	62.5	127,020	33.1	▼28.7
Labour	2	2	0	▲2	25.5	96,738	25.2	▲3.4
Green	1	1	0	▲1	12.5	44,812	11.7	▲7.1
Reform	0	0	0	Steady	0.0	68,306	17.8	New
Liberal Democrats	0	0	0	Steady	0.0	41,479	10.8	▼0.7
Others	0	0	0	Steady	0.0	5,849	1.5	▲1.2
Total	8			Steady		384,204		

=== Hertfordshire ===
Party	Seats					Aggregate Votes		
Party	Total	Gains	Losses	Net	Of all (%)	Total	Of all (%)	Change (%)
Labour	7	7	0	▲7	58.3	177,658	30.5	▲7.0
Conservative	3	0	7	▼7	25.0	177,264	30.4	▼22.3
Liberal Democrats	2	1	0	▲1	16.7	108,704	18.6	▲0.3
Reform	0	0	0	Steady	0.0	80,967	13.9	New
Green	0	0	0	Steady	0.0	33,850	5.8	▲3.3
Others	0	0	0	Steady	0.0	5,492	0.8	▼2.2
Total	12			▲1		583,127		

=== Humberside ===
Party	Seats					Aggregate Votes		
Party	Total	Gains	Losses	Net	Of all (%)	Total	Of all (%)	Change (%)
Labour	6	3	0	▲3	60.0	135,391	37.4	▲8.0
Conservative	4	0	3	▼3	40.0	99,980	27.6	▼28.1
Reform	0	0	0	Steady	0.0	82,716	22.9	▲17.9
Liberal Democrats	0	0	0	Steady	0.0	22,406	6.2	▼0.1
Green	0	0	0	Steady	0.0	33,850	4.3	▲1.8
Others	0	0	0	Steady	0.0	5,807	1.6	▲0.5
Total	10			Steady		381,976		

=== Kent ===
Party	Seats					Aggregate Votes		
Party	Total	Gains	Losses	Net	Of all (%)	Total	Of all (%)	Change (%)
Labour	11	10	0	▲10	61.1	249,043	31.0	▲6.0
Conservative	6	0	10	▼10	33.3	251,860	31.3	▼28.8
Liberal Democrats	1	0	0	▲1	5.6	57,579	7.0	▼3.4
Reform	0	0	0	Steady	0.0	168,652	21.0	New
Green	0	0	0	Steady	0.0	64,303	8.0	▲4.8
Others	0	0	0	Steady	0.0	13,059	1.6	▲0.3
Total	18			▲1		804,496		

=== Lancashire ===
Party	Seats					Aggregate Votes		
Party	Total	Gains	Losses	Net	Of all (%)	Total	Of all (%)	Change (%)
Labour	13	10	1	▲9	81.3	231,808	36.3	▼1.5
Conservative	1	0	10	▼10	6.3	151,797	23.7	▼22.5
Speaker	1	0	0	Steady	6.3	25,238	3.9	▲0.2
Reform	0	0	0	Steady	0.0	112,124	17.5	▲15.2
Liberal Democrats	0	0	0	Steady	0.0	38,345	6.0	▲0.8
Green	0	0	0	Steady	0.0	35,957	5.6	▲2.8
Others	1	1	0	▲1	6.3	13,059	6.9	▲5.1
Total	16			Steady		639,269		

=== Leicestershire and Rutland ===
Party	Seats					Aggregate Votes		
Party	Total	Gains	Losses	Net	Of all (%)	Total	Of all (%)	Change (%)
Conservative	7	2	2	Steady	63.6	173,711	34.2	▼19.1
Labour	3	2	2	Steady	27.3	142,114	28.0	▼4.1
Reform	0	0	0	Steady	0.0	77,889	15.3	▲14.5
Liberal Democrats	0	0	0	Steady	0.0	49,343	9.7	▼0.1
Green	0	0	0	Steady	0.0	34,014	6.7	▲3.2
Others	1	1	0	▲1	9.1	30,875	6.1	▲5.6
Total	11			▲1		507,946		

=== Lincolnshire ===
Party	Seats					Aggregate Votes		
Party	Total	Gains	Losses	Net	Of all (%)	Total	Of all (%)	Change (%)
Conservative	6	0	1	▼1	75.0	130,092	35.6	▼31.6
Labour	1	1	0	▲1	12.5	94,894	26.0	▲5.4
Reform	1	1	0	▲1	12.5	82,464	22.6	▲22.3
Liberal Democrats	0	0	0	Steady	0.0	23,808	6.5	▼1.2
Green	0	0	0	Steady	0.0	18,204	5.0	▲3.1
Others	0	0	0	Steady	0.0	15,514	4.3	▲2.2
Total	8			▲1		364,976		

=== Merseyside ===
Party	Seats					Aggregate Votes		
Party	Total	Gains	Losses	Net	Of all (%)	Total	Of all (%)	Change (%)
Labour	16	2	0	▲2	100.0	324,457	56.8	▼8.4
Reform	0	0	0	Steady	0.0	80,961	14.2	▲9.5
Conservative	0	0	1	▼1	0.0	60,903	10.7	▼9.5
Green	0	0	0	Steady	0.0	54,871	9.6	▲6.9
Liberal Democrats	0	0	0	Steady	0.0	23,808	5.6	Steady
Others	0	0	0	Steady	0.0	17,681	3.1	▲1.5
Total	16			▲1		570,855		

=== Norfolk ===
Party	Seats					Aggregate Votes		
Party	Total	Gains	Losses	Net	Of all (%)	Total	Of all (%)	Change (%)
Labour	4	3	0	▲3	44.4	132,398	28.68	▲2.8
Conservative	3	0	5	▼5	33.3	132,494	28.70	▼28.9
Reform	1	1	0	▲1	11.1	86,482	18.7	▲18.0
Liberal Democrats	1	1	0	▲1	11.1	50,962	11.0	▼1.4
Green	0	0	0	Steady	0.0	50,249	10.9	▲8.4
Others	0	0	0	Steady	0.0	8,999	1.9	▲1.0
Total	10			▲1		461,584		

=== Northamptonshire ===
Party	Seats					Aggregate Votes		
Party	Total	Gains	Losses	Net	Of all (%)	Total	Of all (%)	Change (%)
Labour	5	5	0	▲5	71.4	122,226	36.3	▲7.2
Conservative	2	0	5	▼5	28.6	100,203	29.8	▼29.2
Reform	0	0	0	Steady	0.0	61,502	18.3	New
Green	0	0	0	Steady	0.0	23,170	6.9	▲4.0
Liberal Democrats	0	0	0	Steady	0.0	22,306	6.6	▼1.8
Others	0	0	0	Steady	0.0	6,894	2.0	▲1.4
Total	7			Steady		336,331		

=== Northumberland ===
Party	Seats					Aggregate Votes		
Party	Total	Gains	Losses	Net	Of all (%)	Total	Of all (%)	Change (%)
Labour	4	3	0	▲3	100.0	84,147	45.1	▲11.2
Conservative	0	0	3	▼3	0.0	47,776	25.6	▼23.2
Reform	0	0	0	Steady	0.0	27,999	15.0	▲11.1
Liberal Democrats	0	0	0	Steady	0.0	10,876	5.8	▼4.2
Green	0	0	0	Steady	0.0	8,314	4.5	▲1.3
Others	0	0	0	Steady	0.0	6,894	3.9	▲3.7
Total	4			Steady		186,466		

=== North Yorkshire ===
Party	Seats					Aggregate Votes		
Party	Total	Gains	Losses	Net	Of all (%)	Total	Of all (%)	Change (%)
Labour	4	3	0	▲3	44.4	148,199	33.4	▲7.9
Conservative	4	0	3	▼3	44.4	141,867	32.0	▼24.4
Liberal Democrats	1	1	0	▲1	11.1	53,460	12.0	▼2.7
Reform	0	0	0	Steady	0.0	67,443	15.2	▲14.9
Green	0	0	0	Steady	0.0	26,381	5.9	▲3.3
Others	0	0	0	Steady	0.0	6,618	1.5	▼1.0
Total	9			▲1		440,946		

=== Nottinghamshire ===
Party	Seats					Aggregate Votes		
Party	Total	Gains	Losses	Net	Of all (%)	Total	Of all (%)	Change (%)
Labour	9	6	0	▲6	81.8	201,997	41.5	▲4.1
Conservative	1	0	7	▼7	9.1	119,325	24.5	▼22.9
Reform	1	1	0	▲1	9.1	94,331	19.4	▲16.5
Green	0	0	0	Steady	0.0	30,517	6.3	▲4.4
Liberal Democrats	0	0	0	Steady	0.0	22,827	4.7	▼1.5
Workers Party	0	New			—	4,459	0.9	New
Others	0	0	0	Steady	0.0	13,060	2.7	▼1.5
Total	11			Steady		486,516		

=== Oxfordshire ===
Party	Seats					Aggregate Votes		
Party	Total	Gains	Losses	Net	Of all (%)	Total	Of all (%)	Change (%)
Liberal Democrats	5	4	0	▲4	71.4	117,151	34.7	▲5.3
Labour	2	1	0	▲1	28.6	68,618	20.3	▼0.5
Conservative	0	0	4	▼4	0.0	92,622	27.4	▼19.2
Reform	0	0	0	Steady	0.0	33,776	10.0	▲9.5
Green	0	0	0	Steady	0.0	19,693	5.8	▲3.6
Others	0	0	0	Steady	0.0	10,350	3.1	▼2.6
Total	7			▲1		337,751		

=== Shropshire ===
Party	Seats					Aggregate Votes		
Party	Total	Gains	Losses	Net	Of all (%)	Total	Of all (%)	Change (%)
Labour	2	2	0	▲2	40.0	66,943	27.5	▲1.6
Conservative	2	0	3	▼3	40.0	65,156	26.8	▼33.5
Liberal Democrats	1	1	0	▲1	20.0	55,257	22.7	▲12.3
Reform	0	0	0	Steady	0.0	44,412	18.2	New
Green	0	0	0	Steady	0.0	10,680	4.4	▲1.7
Others	0	0	0	Steady	0.0	1,109	0.5	▼0.2
Total	5			Steady		243,557		

=== Somerset ===
Party	Seats					Aggregate Votes		
Party	Total	Gains	Losses	Net	Of all (%)	Total	Of all (%)	Change (%)
Liberal Democrats	6	6	0	▲6	85.7	114,443	36.5	▲7.5
Conservative	1	0	4	▼4	14.3	88,408	28.2	▼28.5
Reform	0	0	0	Steady	0.0	53,160	17.0	New
Labour	0	0	0	Steady	0.0	34,865	11.1	▲0.7
Green	0	0	0	Steady	0.0	18,076	5.8	▲3.6
Others	0	0	0	Steady	0.0	4,314	1.4	▼0.1
Total	7			▲2		313,266		

=== South Yorkshire ===
Party	Seats					Aggregate Votes		
Party	Total	Gains	Losses	Net	Of all (%)	Total	Of all (%)	Change (%)
Labour	14	3	0	▲3	100.0	249,037	47.4	▲5.1
Conservative	0	0	3	▼3	0.0	88,286	16.8	▼15.5
Reform	0	0	0	Steady	0.0	76,843	14.6	▲1.0
Green	0	0	0	Steady	0.0	43,012	8.2	▲5.9
Liberal Democrats	0	0	0	Steady	0.0	40,758	7.8	Steady
Others	0	0	0	Steady	0.0	27,778	5.3	▲3.6
Total	14			Steady		525,696		

=== Staffordshire ===
Party	Seats					Aggregate Votes		
Party	Total	Gains	Losses	Net	Of all (%)	Total	Of all (%)	Change (%)
Labour	9	9	0	▲9	75.0	183,181	35.4	▲7.1
Conservative	3	0	9	▼9	25.0	164,440	31.8	▼29.8
Reform	0	0	0	Steady	0.0	105,605	20.4	▲19.3
Green	0	0	0	Steady	0.0	23,018	4.4	▲1.3
Liberal Democrats	0	0	0	Steady	0.0	21,396	4.1	▼1.5
Others	0	0	0	Steady	0.0	9,757	1.9	▲1.5
Total	12			Steady		517,614		

=== Suffolk ===
Party	Seats					Aggregate Votes		
Party	Total	Gains	Losses	Net	Of all (%)	Total	Of all (%)	Change (%)
Labour	4	4	0	▲4	50.0	107,057	28.4	▲4.5
Conservative	3	0	4	▼4	37.5	115,953	30.8	▼29.3
Green	1	1	0	▲1	12.5	49,925	13.3	▲6.9
Reform	0	0	0	Steady	0.0	69,230	18.4	▲18.0
Liberal Democrats	0	0	0	Steady	0.0	31,160	8.3	Steady
Others	0	0	0	Steady	0.0	9,757	0.9	Steady
Total	8			▲1		376,667		

=== Surrey ===
Party	Seats					Aggregate Votes		
Party	Total	Gains	Losses	Net	Of all (%)	Total	Of all (%)	Change (%)
Liberal Democrats	6	6	0	▲6	50.0	213,388	35.1	▲6.5
Conservative	6	0	5	▼5	50.0	202,906	33.4	▼20.3
Labour	0	0	0	Steady	0.0	84,921	14.0	▲1.3
Reform	0	0	0	Steady	0.0	74,360	12.2	New
Green	0	0	0	Steady	0.0	26,741	4.4	▲1.7
Others	0	0	0	Steady	0.0	4,768	0.8	▼1.4
Total	12			▲1		607,084		

=== Tyne and Wear ===
Party	Seats					Aggregate Votes		
Party	Total	Gains	Losses	Net	Of all (%)	Total	Of all (%)	Change (%)
Labour	12	0	0	Steady	100.0	238,034	47.7	▼0.1
Reform	0	0	0	Steady	0.0	109,162	21.9	▲12.8
Conservative	0	0	0	Steady	0.0	66,117	13.2	▼17.7
Green	0	0	0	Steady	0.0	39,282	7.9	▲4.8
Liberal Democrats	0	0	0	Steady	0.0	33,350	6.7	▼0.3
Others	0	0	0	Steady	0.0	13,155	2.6	▲0.6
Total	12			Steady		499,100		

=== Warwickshire ===
Party	Seats					Aggregate Votes		
Party	Total	Gains	Losses	Net	Of all (%)	Total	Of all (%)	Change (%)
Labour	4	3	0	▲3	66.7	90,025	31.4	▲4.5
Conservative	1	0	4	▼4	16.7	86,657	30.2	▼26.9
Liberal Democrats	1	1	0	▲1	16.7	43,615	15.2	▼3.2
Reform	0	0	0	Steady	0.0	47,812	16.7	▲16.4
Green	0	0	0	Steady	0.0	15,998	5.6	▲2.1
Others	0	0	0	Steady	0.0	2,507	0.9	▲0.7
Total	6			Steady		286,614		

=== West Midlands (county) ===
Party	Seats					Aggregate Votes		
Party	Total	Gains	Losses	Net	Of all (%)	Total	Of all (%)	Change (%)
Labour	21	8	1	▲7	80.8	387,609	38.7	▼5.4
Conservative	4	0	10	▼10	15.4	226,095	22.6	▼21.8
Reform	0	0	0	Steady	0.0	173,143	17.3	▲14.8
Green	0	0	0	Steady	0.0	64,632	6.5	▲4.2
Liberal Democrats	0	0	0	Steady	0.0	52,746	5.3	▼0.8
Others	1	0	1	▲1	3.8	96,229	9.6	▲9.0
Total	26			▼2		1,000,454		

=== West Sussex ===
Party	Seats					Aggregate Votes		
Party	Total	Gains	Losses	Net	Of all (%)	Total	Of all (%)	Change (%)
Labour	3	3	0	▲3	37.5	102,338	25.0	▲2.4
Liberal Democrats	3	3	0	▲3	37.5	91,349	22.3	▲5.8
Conservative	2	0	6	▼6	25.0	126,025	30.8	▼25.5
Reform	0	0	0	Steady	0.0	60,727	14.8	New
Green	0	0	0	Steady	0.0	22,841	5.6	▲1.8
Others	0	0	0	Steady	0.0	5,778	1.4	▲0.6
Total	8			Steady		409,058		

=== West Yorkshire ===
Party	Seats					Aggregate Votes		
Party	Total	Gains	Losses	Net	Of all (%)	Total	Of all (%)	Change (%)
Labour	20	7	0	▲7	91.0	375,140	42.1	▼3.9
Conservative	1	0	8	▼8	4.5	176,335	19.8	▼19.9
Reform	0	0	0	Steady	0.0	144,656	16.2	▲12.0
Green	0	0	0	Steady	0.0	82,445	9.3	▲7.3
Liberal Democrats	0	0	0	Steady	0.0	41,702	4.7	▼1.4
Others	1	1	0	▲1	4.5	70,020	7.9	▲6.0
Total	22			Steady		890,298		

=== Wiltshire ===
Party	Seats					Aggregate Votes		
Party	Total	Gains	Losses	Net	Of all (%)	Total	Of all (%)	Change (%)
Conservative	3	0	4	▼4	37.5	125,505	32.6	▼25.2
Liberal Democrats	3	3	0	▲3	37.5	96,677	25.1	▲6.5
Labour	2	2	0	▲2	25.0	89,880	23.3	▲3.2
Reform	0	0	0	Steady	0.0	52,755	13.7	New
Green	0	0	0	Steady	0.0	16,864	4.4	▲1.1
Others	0	0	0	Steady	0.0	3,849	1.0	▲0.4
Total	8			▲1		385,530		

== See also ==
- 2024 United Kingdom general election in Northern Ireland
- 2024 United Kingdom general election in Scotland
- 2024 United Kingdom general election in Wales
- Clacton in the 2024 general election
- Islington North in the 2024 general election
- South West Norfolk in the 2024 general election
