= Labour Representation Committee (1900) =

British Labour Party foundation

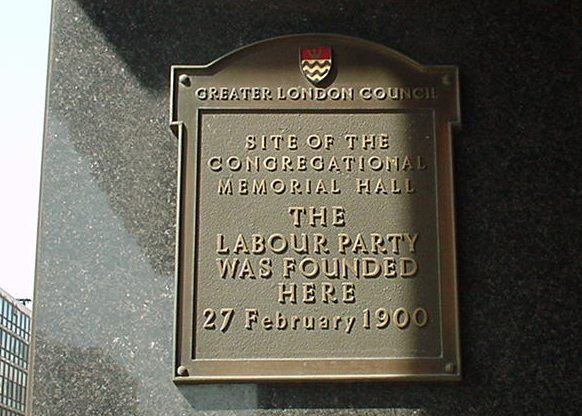
Labour Party Plaque from Caroone House, 14 Farringdon Street

The Labour Representation Committee (LRC; Welsh: Pwyllgor Cynrychiolaeth Llafur) was a pressure group founded in 1900 as an alliance of socialist organisations and trade unions, aimed at increasing representation for labour interests in the Parliament of the United Kingdom. The Labour Party traces its origin to the LRC's foundation.

== Formation ==
In 1899, a Doncaster member of the Amalgamated Society of Railway Servants, Thomas R. Steels, proposed in his union branch that the Trades Union Congress call a special conference to bring together all left-wing organisations and form them into a single body that would sponsor Parliamentary candidates. The motion was passed at all stages by the TUC, and the proposed conference was held at the Congregational Memorial Hall on Farringdon Street, London on 26 and 27 February 1900. The meeting was attended by a broad spectrum of working-class and left-wing organisations — trades unions represented about a half of the unions and one third of the membership of the TUC delegates. The LRC is the direct predecessor of the modern British Labour Party.

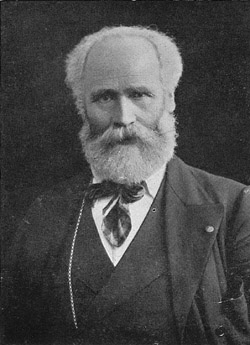
Keir Hardie, one of the Labour Party's founders and its first leader

In addition to various trade union leaders, organisations present at this conference were the Independent Labour Party (ILP), the Social Democratic Federation (SDF) and the Fabian Society, After a debate all the 129 delegates passed Keir Hardie's motion to establish "a distinct Labour group in Parliament, who shall have their own whips, and agree upon their policy, which must embrace a readiness to cooperate with any party which for the time being may be engaged in promoting legislation in the direct interests of labour." This created an association called the Labour Representation Committee (LRC), meant to coordinate attempts to support MPs sponsored by trade unions and represent the working-class population. To make this possible the Conference established the LRC. This committee included two members from the ILP, two from the SDF, one Fabian, and seven trade unionists.

== Operation ==
It had no single leader, and in the absence of one, the Independent Labour Party nominee Ramsay MacDonald was elected as Secretary. He had the difficult task of keeping the various strands of opinions in the LRC united. The October 1900 "Khaki election" came too soon for the new party to campaign effectively; total expenses for the election only came to £33 and between them they won 62,698 votes. Only 15 candidatures were sponsored, but two were successful; Keir Hardie in Merthyr Tydfil and Richard Bell in Derby.

Support for the LRC was boosted by the 1901 Taff Vale Case, a dispute between strikers and a railway company that ended with the union being ordered to pay £23,000 damages for a strike. The judgement effectively made strikes illegal since employers could recoup the cost of lost business from the unions. The apparent acquiescence of the Conservative Government of Arthur Balfour to industrial and business interests (traditionally the allies of the Liberal Party in opposition to the Conservative's landed interests) intensified support for the LRC against a government that appeared to have little concern for the industrial proletariat and its problems.

In the 1906 election, the LRC won 29 seats—helped by a secret Gladstone–MacDonald pact in 1903 between Ramsay MacDonald and Liberal Chief Whip Herbert Gladstone that aimed to avoid splitting the opposition vote between Labour and Liberal candidates in the interest of removing the Conservatives from office.

Historian Eric J. Evans argues:

The MacDonald–Gladstone pact proved to be a turning point. It gave the LRC a bridgehead in parliament, with twenty-nine of its candidates elected in 1906. By the end of 1910, the Labour party (as it was known from 1906) had forty-two MPs....With the benefit of hindsight, the MacDonald-Gladstone pact looks to have been a tactical disaster for the Liberals....On deeper investigation, Gladstone's decision is defensible and might even have been the best option.

== The Labour Party ==
Leaders of the party in 1906

On 15 February 1906, at their first meeting after the election, the group's Members of Parliament decided to adopt the name "The Labour Party" formally.

Keir Hardie, who had taken a leading role in getting the party established, was elected as Chairman of the Parliamentary Labour Party (in effect, the Leader), although only by one vote over David Shackleton after several ballots. In the party's early years the Independent Labour Party (ILP) provided much of its activist base as the party did not have individual membership until 1918 but operated as a conglomerate of affiliated bodies. The Fabian Society provided much of the intellectual stimulus for the party. One of the first acts of the new Liberal Government was to reverse the Taff Vale judgement.

The Labour Party itself regarded 2000 as its centenary year, though it also marked the founding of the party with the singing of "The Red Flag" in parliament at the end of Commons business on 9 February 2006.

== Archive ==
The People's History Museum in Manchester holds the minutes of the first Labour Party meeting in 1906 and has them on display in the Main Galleries. Also within the museum is the Labour History Archive and Study Centre, which holds the collection of the Labour Party, with material ranging from 1900 to the present day.

== Chairmen of the LRC ==
The following served as Chairman of the LRC:

- 1900-01 Frederick Rogers
- 1901-02 Allen Gee
- 1902-03 Richard Bell MP
- 1903-04 John Hodge
- 1904-05 David Shackleton MP
- 1905-06 Arthur Henderson MP

== Election results ==
Election	Seats won	±	Total votes	%	Position	Leader
1900	2 / 670	▲	41,900 (#5)	1.3%	Third party	Keir Hardie
1906	29 / 670	▲	254,202 (#3)	4.8%	Third party	Keir Hardie
Became the Labour Party in 1906
