= Gladstone–MacDonald pact =

Electoral agreement of 1903

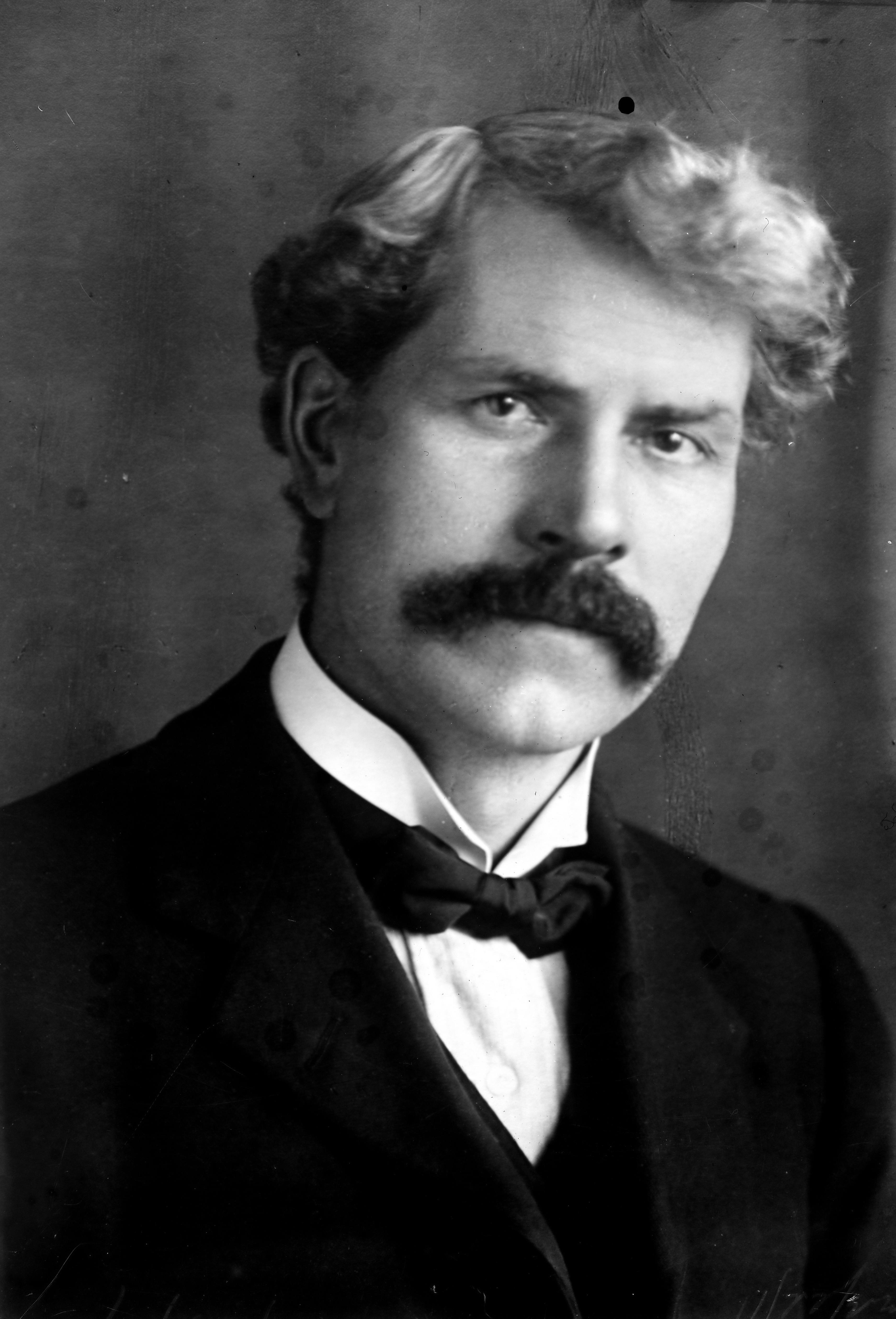
Ramsay MacDonald, Secretary of the Labour Representation Committee

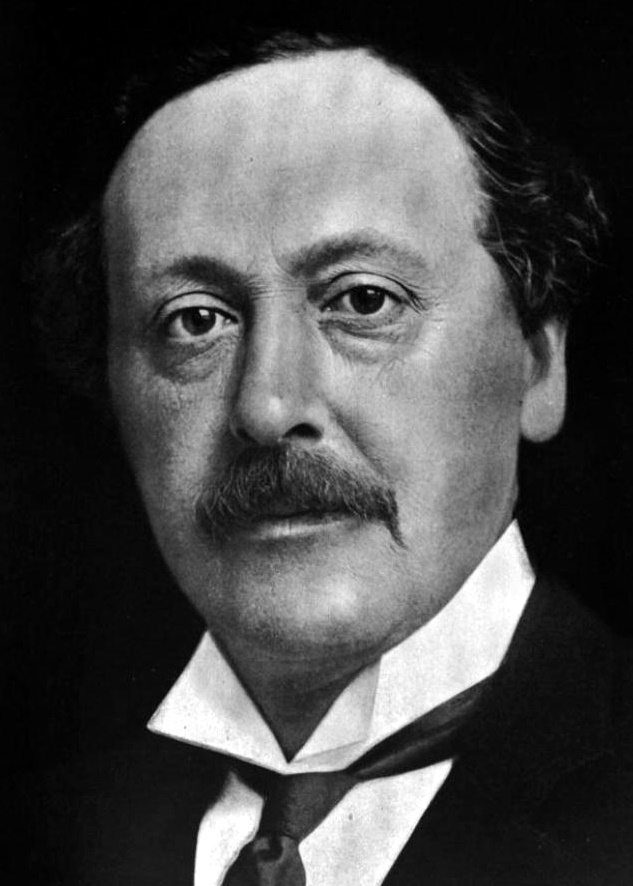
Herbert Gladstone, Chief Whip of the Liberal Party

The Gladstone–MacDonald pact of 1903 was a secret informal electoral agreement negotiated by Herbert Gladstone, Liberal Party Chief Whip, and Ramsay MacDonald, Secretary of the Labour Representation Committee (LRC). The Liberal Party agreed to withdraw parliamentary candidates in some constituencies where the LRC was also standing in order to make sure the anti-Conservative vote was not split.

There was increasing tension between the Liberal Party and the LRC since the latter's formation in 1900. For example, in the by-election for Clitheroe in 1902, local cotton weavers refused to withdraw their candidate, David Shackleton, who was not an approved Lib-Lab candidate. Gladstone therefore withdrew the Liberal candidate and Shackleton was elected unopposed. This was one of the main reasons behind the formation of the pact.

In the general election of 1906, 31 of the 50 LRC candidates contested seats where the Liberals agreed not to put up a candidate. 24 of the 29 LRC MPs elected in that election were in seats where the Liberals did not stand. Eric J. Evans argues:

The MacDonald–Gladstone pact proved to be a turning point. It gave the LRC a bridgehead in parliament, with twenty-nine of its candidates elected in 1906. By the end of 1910, the Labour party (as it was known from 1906) had forty-two MPs. ... With the benefit of hindsight, the MacDonald–Gladstone pact looks to have been a tactical disaster for the Liberals. ... On deeper investigation, Gladstone's decision is defensible and might even have been the best option.

== See also ==
- Lib–Lab pact
