= List of elections in 1886 =

The following elections occurred in the year 1886.

== South America ==
- 1886 Argentine presidential election
- 1886 Brazilian parliamentary election
- 1886 Chilean presidential election
- 1886 Colombian presidential election
- 1886 Peruvian general election

== North America ==
=== Canada ===
- 1886 British Columbia general election
- 1886 Manitoba general election
- 1886 New Brunswick general election
- 1886 Nova Scotia general election
- 1886 Ontario general election
- 1886 Prince Edward Island general election
- 1886 Quebec general election

=== United States ===
- 1886 New York state election
- 1886 United States elections
- United States House of Representatives elections in South Carolina, 1886
- 1886 South Carolina gubernatorial election

==== United States Senate ====
- 1886 and 1887 United States Senate elections
- 1886 United States Senate special election in California

==== United States House of Representatives ====
- 1886 United States House of Representatives elections
- United States House of Representatives elections in California, 1886
- United States House of Representatives elections in Florida, 1886
- United States House of Representatives elections in South Carolina, 1886

==== United States lieutenant gubernatorial ====
- 1886 California lieutenant gubernatorial election
- 1886 Connecticut lieutenant gubernatorial election
- 1886 Minnesota lieutenant gubernatorial election
- 1886 Nebraska lieutenant gubernatorial election
- 1886 Texas lieutenant gubernatorial election
- 1886 Wisconsin lieutenant gubernatorial election

==== United States gubernatorial ====
- 1886 Alabama gubernatorial election
- 1886 Arkansas gubernatorial election
- 1886 California gubernatorial election
- 1886 Colorado gubernatorial election
- 1886 Connecticut gubernatorial election
- 1886 Delaware gubernatorial election
- 1886 Georgia gubernatorial election
- 1886 Kansas gubernatorial election
- 1886 Maine gubernatorial election
- 1886 Massachusetts gubernatorial election
- 1886 Michigan gubernatorial election
- 1886 Minnesota gubernatorial election
- 1886 Nebraska gubernatorial election
- 1886 Nevada gubernatorial election
- 1886 New Hampshire gubernatorial election
- 1886 New Jersey gubernatorial election
- 1886 Oregon gubernatorial election
- 1886 Pennsylvania gubernatorial election
- 1886 Rhode Island gubernatorial election
- 1886 South Carolina gubernatorial election
- 1886 Tennessee gubernatorial election
- 1886 Texas gubernatorial election
- 1886 Vermont gubernatorial election
- 1886 Wisconsin gubernatorial election

==== United States mayoral elections ====
- 1886 Boston mayoral election
- 1886 Manchester, New Hampshire mayoral election
- 1886 New York City mayoral election

== Europe ==
=== United Kingdom ===
- 1886 Altrincham by-election
- 1886 Banffshire by-election
- 1886 Barrow-in-Furness by-election
- 1886 Battersea by-election
- 1886 Bedfordshire Southern by-election
- 1886 Mid Armagh by-election
- 1886 Sydenham by-election
- 1886 United Kingdom general election
- 1886 United Kingdom general election in Ireland
- 1886 United Kingdom general election in Scotland

== See also ==
- Category:1886 elections
