= North Worcestershire =

North Worcestershire could be

- North Worcestershire (constituency), former constituency of the UK House of Commons
- North Worcestershire (district), future unitary authority area
