= 1886 United Kingdom general election in England =

- 1–27 July 1886

All 461 English seats to the House of Commons
- Turnout: 74.1% (▼7.8 pp)
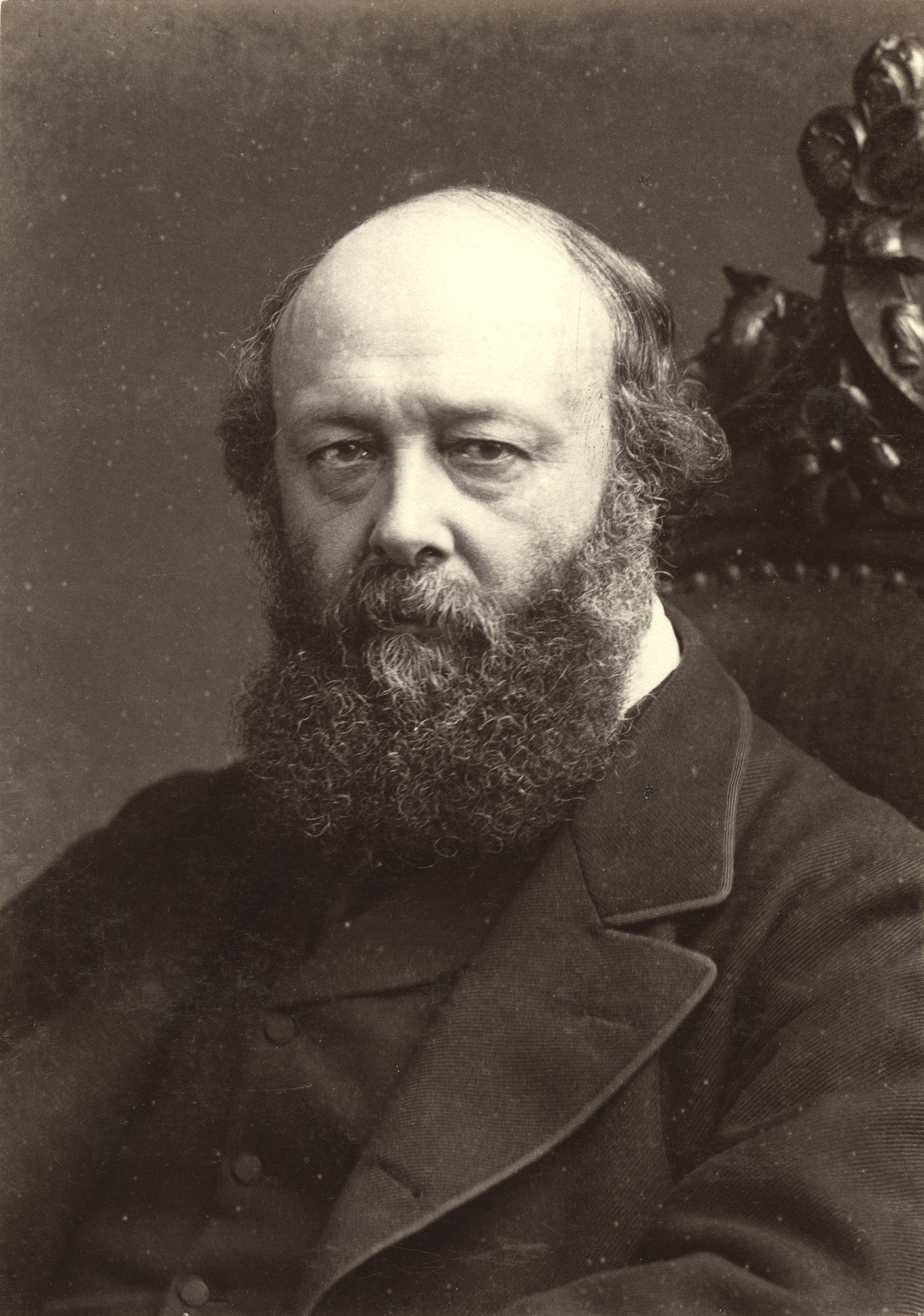

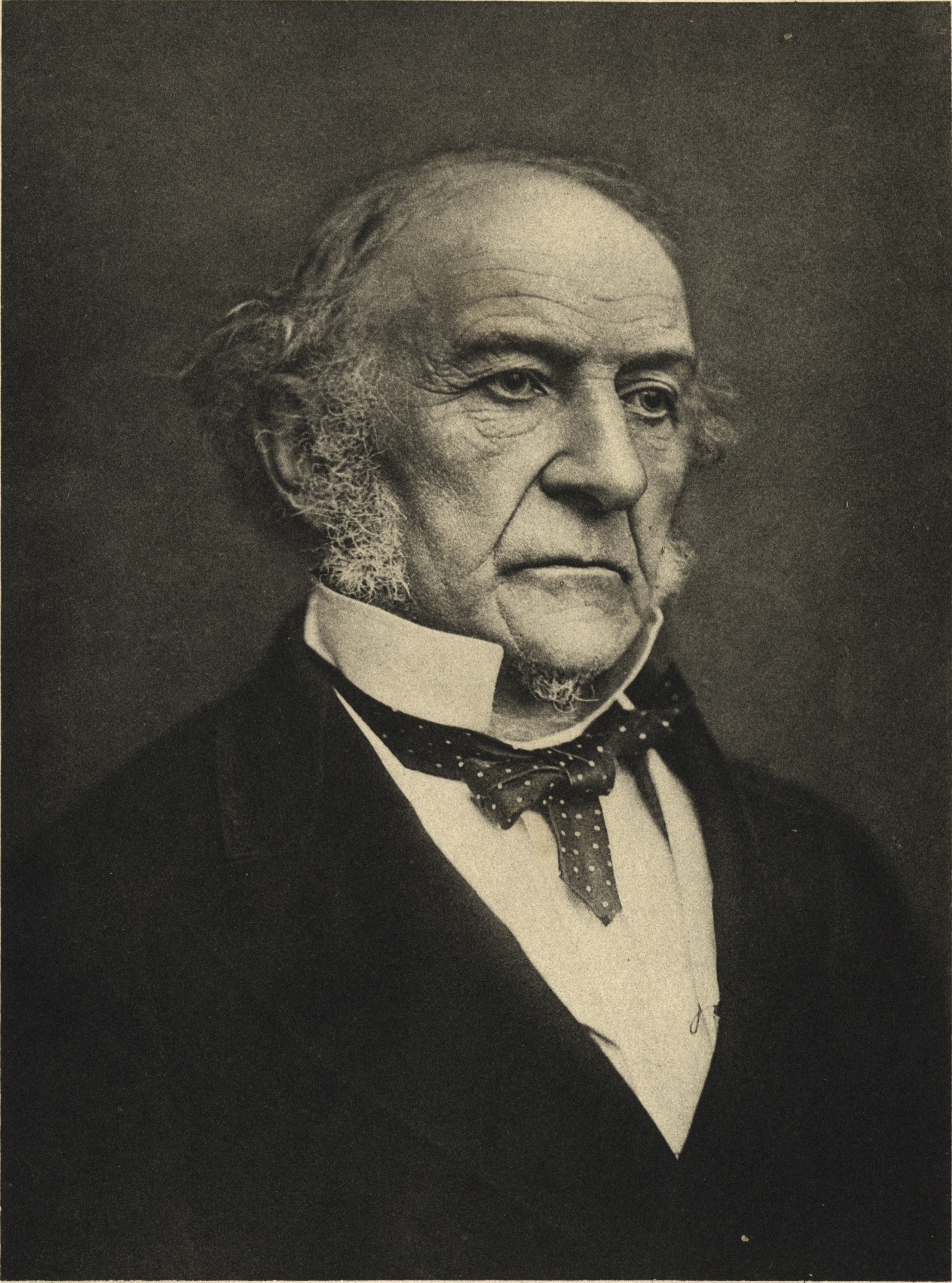

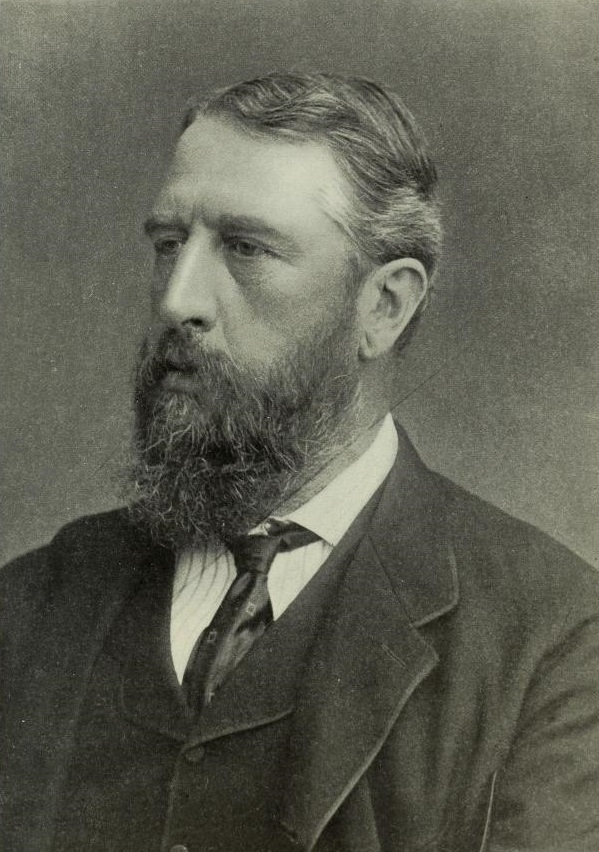
	First party	Second party	Third party
Leader	Marquess of Salisbury	William Ewart Gladstone	Marquess of Harrington
Party	Conservative	Liberal	Liberal Unionist
Alliance	Conservative-Liberal Unionist		Conservative-Liberal Unionist
Leader since	April 1881	April 1880	1886
Leader's seat	House of Lords	Midlothian	Rossendale
Last election	217 seats, (Note: Combined results for borough, county and university seats) 47.5%	239 seats, 51.4%	Did not stand
Seats won	282	122	56 (Note: Figure includes Speaker of the House of Commons Arthur Peel in Warwick and Leamington.)
Seat change	▲65	▼117	▲56
Popular vote	930,973 (Note: Total and percentage votes given here are for territorial constituencies only)	1,087,065	262,316
Percentage	41.1%	47.2%	11.5%
Swing	▼6.4 pp	▼4.2 pp	New party

From 1 to 27 July 1886, the 1886 United Kingdom general election was held in England, to elect all 670 members of the House of Commons, with 461 seats being in England. 456 seats represented territorial constituencies contested under the first past the post electoral system, and several multi-member constituencies under the block voting system; and 5 additional seats represented the 3 university constituencies which returned members under different voting systems.

The election came about as a result of the Liberal Party's resignation of Government and request for a parliamentary dissolution after a defeat in the House of Commons on the Government of Ireland Bill 1886, a major defeat within the Irish Home Rule movement. The Liberal Party support also brought a major split within the Liberals, leading the creation the Liberal Unionist Party under the leadership of the Marquess of Harrington. The Liberal Unionists entered a broad alliance with the Conservative Party which would last until the Liberal Unionist merger into the latter political party in 1912.

== Candidates ==
Below is a table summarising the candidates of the 1886 general election in England, excluding those in the university constituencies.

Affiliation	Candidates
Liberal Party	347 (Note: Includes 13 Liberal-Labour candidates.)
Conservative Party	336
Liberal Unionist Party	96
Independent Liberal Unionist	2 (Note: The candidates that stood were William Pirie Duff in Camberwell North and William Henry Hall in Newmarket.)
Nationalist Party	1 (Note: Candidate T. P. O'Connor stood in Liverpool Scotland.)
Independent Liberal	1 (Note: Candidate Sir John Bennett stood in Cricklade.)
Total	783

== Analysis ==
=== Conservative Party ===
The Conservative Party saw a surge in seats across England, despite seeing a relatively sharp drop in its vote share. The party stood far fewer candidates than it had in 1885, with it standing 336 candidates in county and borough constituencies, compared with 440 in 1885. Aside multi-member seats, the Conservatives did not stand candidates against its ally, the Liberal Unionist Party, aside in three seats of Torquay, Romford and Petersfield. In Torquay, the sitting Liberal MP Lewis McIver had joined the splitting Liberal Unionists, however was stood against a Conservative candidate despite the parties' alliance against the Liberal Party. The seat was a gain from the Liberal Party. Similarly, in Romford, former Liberal MP John Westlake lost against a Liberal and a Conservative candidate, placing third, with the Conservative Party winning the seat. Lastly, in William Palmer in Petersfield won the seat, following his defection from the Liberals, despite a Conservative standing against him in the constituency.

Nevertheless, the Conservative Party saw a net increase of 65 seats despite its fewer candidates and resulting fall in vote share, with 77 gains from the Liberal Party, but also with 12 losses to the Liberals. Leader of the Conservative Party, the Marquess of Salisbury, won the election and formed a new government nationally, with the support of the Liberal Unionist Party. It would hold this alliance at the constituency and governance levels with the Liberal Unionists throughout the latter's existence.

=== Liberal Unionist Party ===
The newly formed Liberal Unionist Party, under the leadership of former leader of the Liberal Party, Marquess of Harrington, were successful across England and the United Kingdom as a whole. The party stood in an alliance with the Conservative Party, which would last until the Liberal Unionist merger with the Conservative Party to form the modern Conservative and Unionist Party in 1912. The party had split from the Liberal Party following opposition amongst the Liberal faction opposed to Irish Home Rule.

In England, the Liberal Unionists saw a vote share of around 11.5% and 55 seats amongst the county and borough constituencies, almost all of which were gains from the Liberal Party, from which it split over the question of Irish Home Rule. The Liberal Unionists won the county and borough constituencies of Bodmin, St Ives, Truro, Barnstaple, South Molton, Tavistock, Totnes, East Somerset, Bristol North, Cirencester, Cricklade, Wilton, Woodstock, Aylesbury, Petersfield, Biggleswade, Mid Norfolk, South Norfolk, Lowestoft, Sudbury, Ludlow, Wellington (Shropshire), Handsworth, Newcastle-under-Lyme, West Staffordshire, Wolverhampton South, Ross, Droitwich, North Worcestershire, North Worcestershire, East Worcestershire, Chesterfield, West Derbyshire, Great Grimsby, Barrow and Furness, Burnley, Bury, Northwich, South East Durham, The Hartlepools, Colne Valley and Skipton. It also won one of the two seats in Bath and Portsmouth, as well as one university constituency seat in London University.

It also won a number of seats in metropolitan borough seats. In Birmingham these were Birmingham Bordesley, Birmingham Central, Birmingham Edgbaston, Birmingham North, Birmingham South and Birmingham West. In Birmingham West, leading figure of the movement and future Leader of the Liberal Unionists, Joseph Chamberlain, retained his seat as a Liberal Unionist. In the County of London, it won Islington West (the seat of Richard Chamberlain, Joseph Chamberlain's younger brother) and St Pancras South. It also won Hythe, wherein former Liberal MP, Edward Watkin, who had sat as an Independent Liberal after leaving the party before the 1885 election, joined the new Liberal Unionists for this election. The seat was a gain for the Liberal Unionists. Similarly, in Peterborough, John Wentworth-FitzWilliam, who had sat as an Independent Liberal, joined the Liberal Unionists, retained the seat and thereby gained it for the party.

Amongst its wins, Leader of the Liberal Unionists, the Marquess of Harrington, retained his seat of Rossendale. He would hold the seat for the Liberal Unionists, a gain from his former Liberal Party. He would, however, take his peerage in as the Duke of Devonshire, following which the 1892 Rossendale by-election was held. The Liberals would take back the seat before the next election in 1892. As a further upset in this political realignment against the Liberal Party, Speaker of the House of Commons, Arthur Peel, had defected from the Liberal Party to the Liberal Unionists. He retained his seat of Warwick and Leamington, a gain from the Liberal Party, as well as retained his position as Speaker throughout the new Parliament.

Overall, the Liberal Unionists took 56 seats across England from the Liberal Party, and joined and maintained its alliance with the Conservative Party. Combined with the results across the country, it won 77 seats nationally. When combined with the Conservative Party, with which it formed a government, the parties held a combined 332 seats in England, with a combined 393 seats nationally.

=== Liberal Party ===
The Liberal party saw a collapse in support in England, much like it saw in Scotland. The Liberals saw a drop in support by 4.2% to 47.2%, thereby losing its majority vote share in England. In addition, it saw a loss of 128 seats amongst the county and borough constituencies, which were loses between the Conservatives and Liberal Unionists, which had split from the party over the dispute over Irish Home Rule. It also lost London University wherein John Lubbock, who had also joined the Liberal Unionist Party, retained the seat but gained it from the Liberal Party.

The Liberals did see some gains, however. The party won Camborne and one of the two seats in Newcastle-upon-Tyne from Independent Liberal. Both sitting Independent Liberal MPs –– Charles Conybeare in Camborne and Joseph Cowen in Newcastle-upon-Tyne –– had rejoined the Liberal party whip and retained their seats but as Liberal Party candidates. Further, the Liberals won Wednesbury, Wolverhampton West, Cockermouth, Lancaster, Liverpool Exchange, Manchester North, Manchester South West, Scarborough and Leeds East from the Conservative Party.

The party also won Finsbury East, wherein Liberal-Labour candidate gained the seat. He with 7 other Liberal-Labour MPs gave their support to the Liberal and with Liberal support and sponsorship of respective unions held a total of 8 seats. Other Liberal-Labour MPs held Bethnal Green North East, Haggerston, Mid Durham, Morpeth, Wansbeck and Normanton, although lost seats to Conservative and Liberal Unionist candidates. These were West Ham South and Houghton-le-Spring to the Conservative party, and Birmingham Bordesley to the Liberal Unionists. Additionally, Nottingham West was also held by the Liberal Party, but under Liberal-Labour candidate Henry Broadhurst who replaced the retiring Liberal MP. Overall, the Liberals saw a fall of a net 117 to 122 seats in England, within which 8 Liberal-Labour MPs held seats.

=== Other parties ===
Amongst the major parties, the four Independent Liberal candidates had retained their seats from 1885, but as either official candidates for the Liberal Unionist Party or the Liberal Party. As such, none remained independent of any party.

Irish Nationalist MP and member of the Irish Parliamentary Party, T. P. O'Connor, retained his seat in Liverpool Scotland, which he had won for the first time at the previous election. No other Irish Nationalist stood in England as this election.

== Seats summary ==
Below is a table summarising the total number of seats, gains and losses for each party in both the territorial county and borough constituencies and the university constituencies.

Party	Seats				
Party	Total	Gains	Losses	Net	Of all (%)
Conservative-Liberal Unionist	338	New		▲121	73.1
Conservative	282	77	12	▲65	61.0
Liberal Unionist	56	New		▲56	12.1
Liberal	122 (Note: Includes 8 Liberal-Labour MPs.)	12	129	▼117	26.7
Irish Nationalist	1	0	0	Steady	0.2
Independent Liberal	0	0	4	▼4	—
Total	461				

== County and borough results ==
Below is a table summarising the constituency results of the 1886 general election in England, excluding the result in the university constituencies.

Party	Seats					Aggregate votes		
Party	Total	Gains	Losses	Net	Of total (%)	Total	Of total (%) (Note: Adjusted for multi-member constituencies.)	Change (%)
Conservative-Liberal Unionist	333	New		▲120	72.8	1,193,289	52.6	New
Conservative	278	77	12	▲65	60.7	930,973	41.1	▼6.4
Liberal Unionist	55	New		▲55	12.1	262,316	11.5	New
Liberal	122 (Note: Includes 8 Liberal-Labour MPs.)	12	128	▼116	27.0	1,087,065	47.2	▼4.2
Irish Nationalist	1 (Note: T. P. O'Connor in Liverpool Scotland.)	0	0	Steady	0.2	2,911	0.1	Steady
Independent Liberal	0	0	4	▼4	—	1,247	0.1	▼0.6
Ind. Liberal Unionist	0	New			—	544	0.0	New
Total	456			0	100.0	2,285,056	100.0	0.0
Registered voters, and turnout						2,828,983 (Note: Electorate in contested constituencies. The total electorate was 4,094,674.)	74.1	▼7.8

=== Popular vote ===
Popular vote
Liberal	47.2%
Conservative	41.1%
Liberal Unionist	11.5%
Irish Nationalist	0.1%
Others	0.1%

Popular vote (alliances)
Con-LU	52.6%
Liberal	47.2%
Irish Nationalist	0.1%
Others	0.1%

=== Parliament seats ===
Parliament seats
Conservative	60.7%
Liberal	27.0%
Liberal Unionist	12.1%
Irish Nationalist	0.2%

Parliament seats (alliances)
Con-LU	72.8%
Liberal	27.0%
Irish Nationalist	0.2%

== University constituency results ==
=== University results summary ===
Below is a table summarising the seats and vote share of the English university constituencies in the 1886 general election.

Party	Seats				Aggregate votes	
Party	Total	Gains	Losses	Net	Total	Of all (%)
Conservative-Liberal Unionist	5	New		▲1	1,314	71.8
Conservative	4	0	0	Steady	0	0.0
Liberal Unionist	1	New		▲1	1,314	71.8
Liberal	0	0	0	▼1	516	28.2
Total	5				1,830	

=== Cambridge University ===
The constituency for Cambridge University returned two Members of Parliament using the Plurality block voting electoral system. The electorate consisted of graduates of the university.

General election 1886: Cambridge University (2 seats)
Party	Candidate	Votes	%	±%
Conservative	Alexander Beresford Hope	Unopposed		
Conservative	Henry Cecil Raikes	Unopposed		
Conservative hold				
Conservative hold				

=== London University ===
The constituency for London University returned one Member of Parliament using the First-past-the-post electoral system. The electorate consisted of graduates of the university.

General election 1886: London University
Party	Candidate	Votes	%	±%
Liberal Unionist	John Lubbock	1,314	71.8	N/A
Liberal	Frederic Harrison	516	28.2	N/A
Majority		798	43.6	N/A
Turnout		1,830	71.0	N/A
Registered electors		2,579		
Liberal Unionist gain from Liberal		Swing	N/A	

=== Oxford University ===
The constituency for Oxford University returned two Members of Parliament using the Plurality block voting electoral system. The electorate consisted of graduates of the university.

General election 2 July 1886: Oxford University (2 seats)
Party	Candidate	Votes	%	±%
Conservative	John Mowbray	Unopposed		
Conservative	John Gilbert Talbot	Unopposed		
Conservative hold				
Conservative hold				

== See also ==
- 1886 United Kingdom general election in Ireland
- 1886 United Kingdom general election in Scotland
- 1886 United Kingdom general election in Wales
- List of United Kingdom Parliament constituencies (1885–1918) by region
