= Harvey W. Hardy =

American politician (1825–1913)

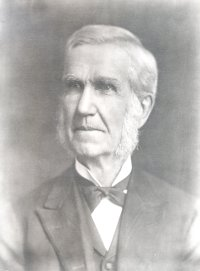

7th Mayor of Lincoln, Nebraska
- In office 1877–1879
- Preceded by: Seth P. Galey
- Succeeded by: Robert D. Silver

Personal details
- Born: Harvey Wesley Hardy; October 29, 1825 Perry, New York, U.S.
- Died: January 10, 1913 (aged 87) Lincoln, Nebraska, U.S.
- Resting place: Wyuka Cemetery
- Party: Democratic; Prohibition (1884–1896); Republican (1856–1884); Whig (before 1856)
- Spouse: Charlotte Abbott (m. 1855; died 1897)
- Parents: Samuel Hardy (father); Polly Parker (mother)
- Education: Genesee Community College

Harvey Wesley Hardy (October 29, 1825 – January 10, 1913) was an American politician who served as the seventh mayor of Lincoln, Nebraska, from 1877 to 1879.

== Life ==
Harvey Wesley Hardy was born on October 29, 1825, to Samuel Hardy and Polly Parker in Perry, New York, and his family moved to Gainesville, New York, in 1830. Hardy attended public schools until he was seventeen, then attended Wesleyan Seminary, and graduated from Genesee Community College. Afterwards, he became superintendent of schools in Gainesville and then Wyoming county superintendent. On June 6, 1855, he married Charlotte Abbott and would later have four children with her. In 1868, he moved to Aurora, Illinois, and then moved to Lincoln, Nebraska, in 1870, where he operated furniture businesses in both places.

Hardy joined the Whig Party and later joined the Republican Party shortly after it was founded. In 1877, he was elected as mayor of Lincoln, Nebraska, and then again in 1878, donating his first $300 municipal salary to fund the Lincoln Public Library. During his tenure as mayor, he created a $1,000 liquor license fee. During the 1884 presidential election, he joined the Prohibition Party and supported former Kansas Governor John St. John. In 1884, he ran for the Nebraska Senate and for governor in 1886 with the Prohibition nominations. During the 1896 presidential election he supported William Jennings Bryan.

Hardy died in Lincoln, Nebraska, on January 10, 1913.

== Electoral history ==
1886 Nebraska gubernatorial election
Party	Candidate	Votes	%	±%
Republican	John Milton Thayer	76,456	55.18%	+0.64%
Democratic	James E. North	52,456	37.86%	−5.29%
Prohibition	Harvey W. Hardy	8,198	5.92%	+3.62%
National	J. Burrows	1,422	1.03%	+1.03%
Write-in		30	0.02%	+0.01%
Total votes		138,562	100.00%	
