= List of MPs for constituencies in Wales (1886–1892) =

- 1–27 July 1886

This is a list of Members of Parliament elected to the Parliament of the United Kingdom between the 1886 United Kingdom general election and the 1892 United Kingdom general election.

== List of members of parliament ==
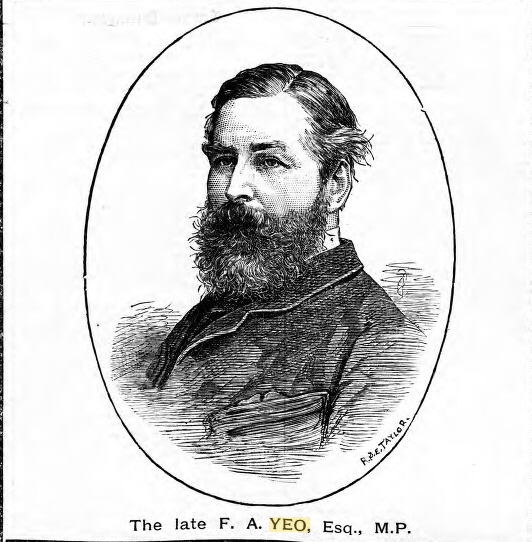
Frank Ash Yeo AS

- William Abraham
- Arthur Cowell-Stepney
- William Davies
- Lewis Llewelyn Dillwyn
- Thomas Edward Ellis
- Sir George Elliot, 1st Baronet
- Samuel Thomas Evans (from 1890)
- William Fuller-Maitland
- David Lloyd George (from 1890)
- Walter Rice Howell Powell (until 1889)
- Charles Herbert James (until 1888)
- Frederick Hanbury-Tracy
- George Thomas Kenyon
- John Lloyd Morgan
- Frederick Courtenay Morgan
- Thomas Lewis
- Christopher Rice Mansel Talbot
- Richard Charles Mayne
- Abel Thomas (from 1890)
- Alfred Thomas (until 1890)
- George Osborne Morgan
- William Pritchard Morgan (from 1888)
- David Pugh (until 1890)
- Thomas Phillips Price
- William Rathbone
- Henry Richard (until 1888)
- Edward James Reed
- David Randell (from 1888)
- Stuart Rendel
- John Bryn Roberts
- John Roberts
- William Bowen Rowlands
- Samuel Smith
- Edmund Swetenham (until 1890)
- Christopher Rice Mansel Talbot (until 1890)
- Abel Thomas (from 1890)
- David Alfred Thomas (from 1888)
- Henry Hussey Vivian
- Arthur Walsh
- Cornelius Marshall Warmington
- William Cornwallis West
- Arthur John Williams
- Frank Ash Yeo (until 1888)

== See also ==
- 1886 United Kingdom general election
- 1886 United Kingdom general election in Wales
