= 1886 United Kingdom general election in Wales =

- 1–27 July 1886

All 34 Welsh seats to the House of Commons
- Turnout: 74.5% (▼7.7 pp)
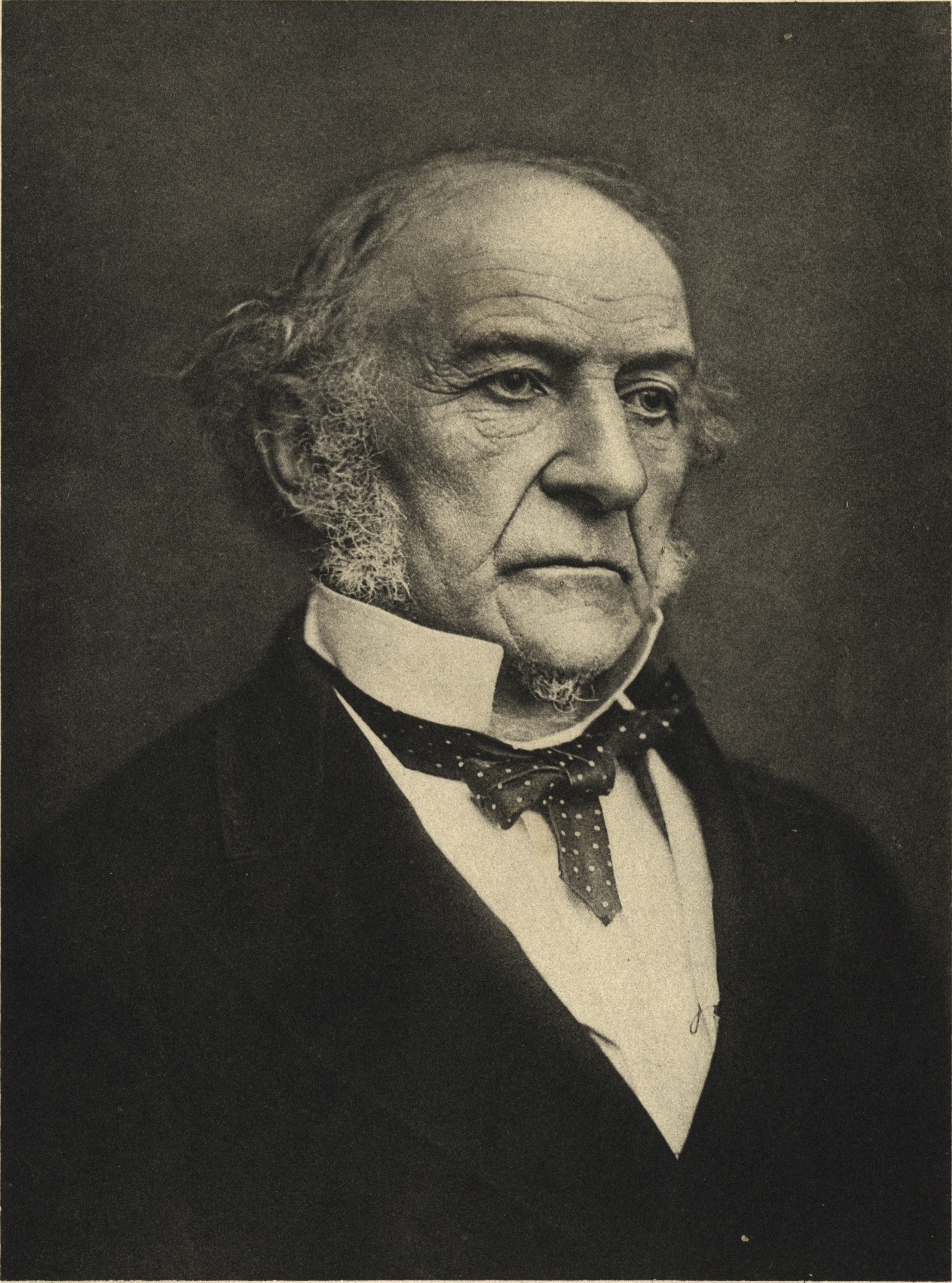

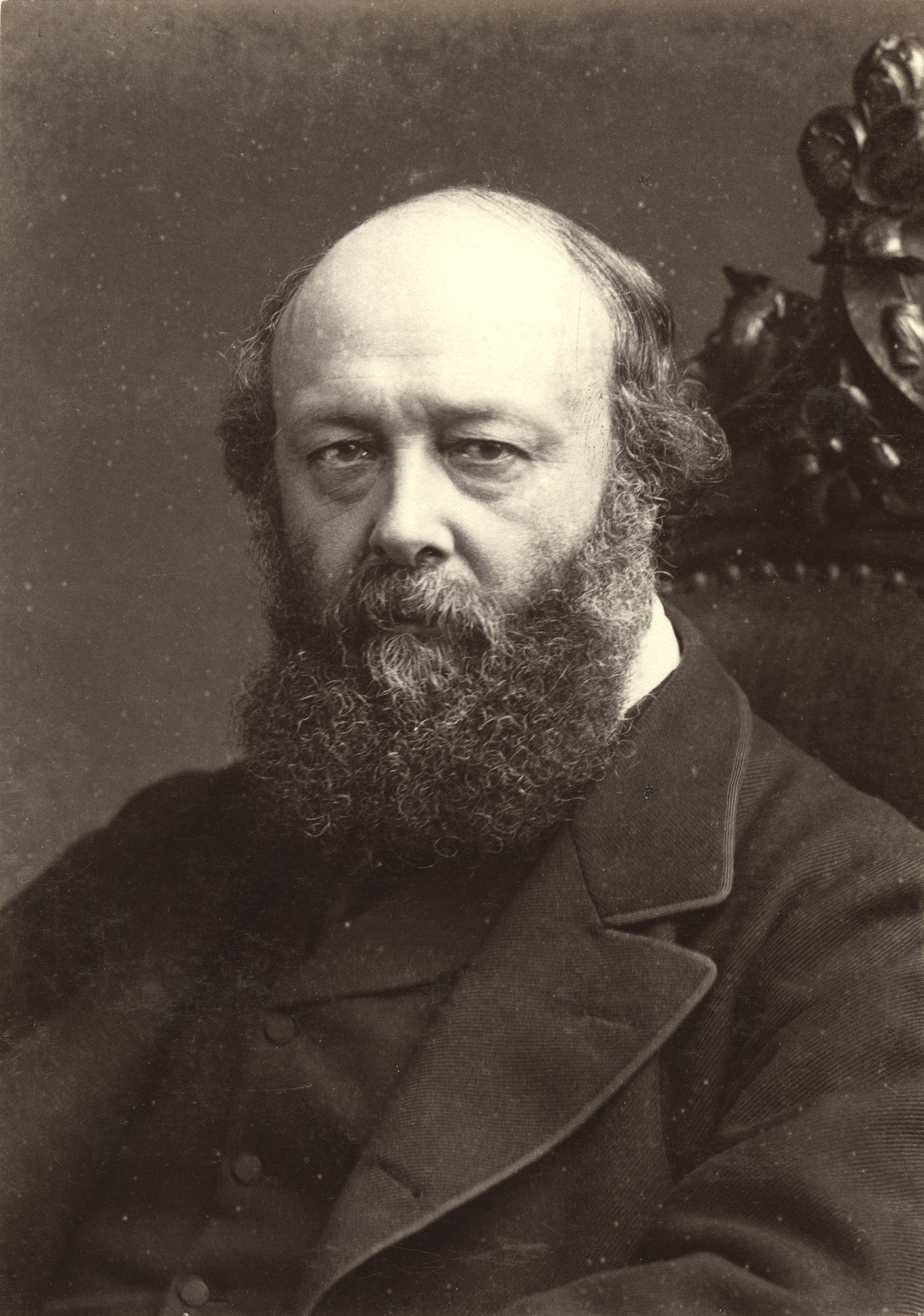

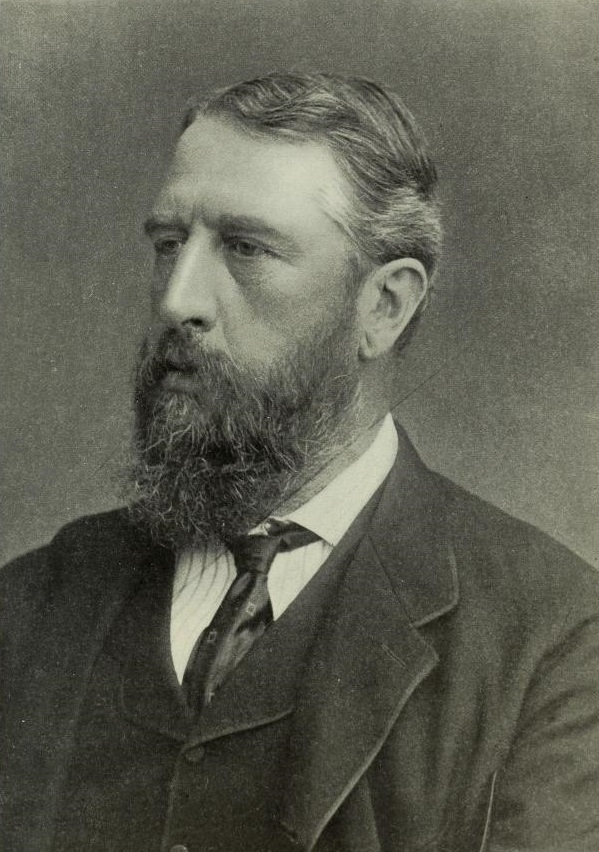
	First party	Second party	Third party
Leader	William Ewart Gladstone	Marquess of Salisbury	Marquess of Harrington
Party	Liberal	Conservative	Liberal Unionist
Alliance		Conservative-Liberal Unionist	Conservative-Liberal Unionist
Leader since	April 1880	April 1881	1886
Leader's seat	Midlothian	House of Lords	Rossendale
Last election	29 seats, 58.3%	4 seats, 38.9%	Did not stand
Seats won	26	6	2
Seat change	▼3	▲2	▲2
Popular vote	70,289	40,439	19,609
Percentage	53.9%	31.1%	15.0%
Swing	▼4.4 pp	▼7.8 pp	New party

From 1 to 27 July 1886, the 1886 United Kingdom general election was held in Wales, to elect all 670 members of the House of Commons, with 34 seats being in Wales. 34 seats represented territorial constituencies contested under the first past the post electoral system amongst 33 constituencies.

The election came about as a result of the Liberal Party's resignation of Government and request for a parliamentary dissolution after a defeat in the House of Commons on the Government of Ireland Bill 1886, a major defeat within the Irish Home Rule movement. The Liberal Party support also brought a major split within the Liberals, leading the creation the Liberal Unionist Party under the leadership of the Marquess of Harrington. The Liberal Unionists entered a broad alliance with the Conservative Party which would last until the Liberal Unionist merger into the latter political party in 1912.

Despite the overwhelming trend across the United Kingdom at this election of the Liberal Party losing seats to the Conservatives and new Liberal Unionist Party in Scotland and England, the Liberal Party's results remained relatively stable in Wales.

== Candidates ==
Below is a table summarising the candidates of the 1886 general election in Wales.

Affiliation	Candidates
Liberal Party	32 (Note: Includes Liberal-Labour candidate William Abraham who stood in Rhondda.)
Conservative Party	14
Liberal Unionist Party	10 (Note: Candidates stood in Eifion, West Denbighshire, Flint Boroughs, Cardiganshire, Carmarthen Boroughs, West Carmarthenshire, Cardiff, South Glamorganshire, Swansea District and Swansea.)
Total	56

== Analysis ==
Across the United Kingdom, the Liberal Party under the leadership of William Ewart Gladstone lost 127 seats to the Conservative Party and the newly formed Liberal Unionist Party. However, despite the overwhelming trend of this occurring in England and Scotland, there was very change in terms of seats in Wales.

=== Liberal Party ===
The Liberal Party saw a relatively minor drop in vote share across Wales, only losing 3 seats. The Liberals maintained 26 seats in Wales as well as holding its Welsh majority vote of 53.9%. The Liberal Party retained the seats of Anglesey, Arfon, Eifion, East Denbighshire, Flint Boroughs, Flintshire, Merioneth, Montgomeryshire, Breconshire, Cardiganshire, Carmarthen Boroughs, East Carmarthenshire, West Carmarthenshire, Pembrokeshire, Cardiff, East Glamorganshire, Mid Glamorganshire, South Glamorganshire, Gower, Swansea Town, North Monmouthshire and West Monmouthshire. The party also won both seats in the two-member constituency of Merthyr Tydfil.

Liberal Party also gained Montgomery from the Conservative Party. William Abraham, who had won as an Independent Liberal-Labour candidate in 1885 in Rhondda. As William stood in the support of the Liberal Party, he had been regarded as in effect a winning candidate for the Liberal Party. As such, the Liberal Party had won two seats, however lost five.

=== Conservatives and Liberal Unionists ===
The Conservatives Party itself stood far fewer candidates than at the last election in Wales, standing no candidates against Liberal Unionist candidates, with the Conservatives suffering a loss in vote share more widely. Nevertheless, the Conservative Party won Carnarvon Boroughs, Pembroke and Haverfordwest and Monmouth Boroughs from the Liberal Party. The Conservative Party also retained Denbigh Boroughs, Radnorshire and South Monmouthshire. As such, with its sinlge loss to the Liberals, the Conservatives took six seats in Wales.

The newly formed Liberal Unionist Party, which had formed from split in the Liberal Party over Irish Home Rule, stood 10 candidates in Wales at the election, though saw limited success in Wales. Former Liberal MP Henry Vivian retained his seat of Swansea District unopposed, representing a gain from the Liberal Party, although would rejoin the Liberal Party before the next election. In West Denbighshire, William Cornwallis-West, also a former Liberal MP, retained his seat unopposed which was also a gain from the Liberal Party.

Another former Liberal MPs David Davies re-contested his seat of Cardiganshire, along with John Jones Jenkins in Carmarthen Boroughs, however both lost their seats to a Liberal candidates. The seats were, therefore, retains for the Liberal Party. Jenkins would successfully attempt the seat subsequently in 1895, however.

Former Liberal MP and former Lord Mayor of London Sir James Lawrence contended West Carmarthenshire, however was defeated. Henry Brand, former Liberal MP for Stroud, was also unsuccessful in Cardiff. Several other unsuccessful candidates contended the remaining seat who were not themselves former MPs.

== Results ==
Party	Seats					Aggregate votes		
Party	Total	Gains	Losses	Net	Of total (%)	Total	Of total (%) (Note: Adjusted for multi-member constituencies.)	Change (%)
Liberal	26	2 (Note: Includes Liberal-Labour MP William Abraham in Rhondda.)	5	▼3	76.5	70,289	53.9	▼4.4
Conservative-Liberal Unionist	8	New		▲4	23.5	60,048	46.1	New
Conservative	6	3	1	▲2	17.6	40,439	31.1	▼7.8
Liberal Unionist	2	New		▲2	5.9	19,609	15.0	New
Other non-contested	0	—N/a		▼1 (Note: William Abraham in Rhondda retained his seat but is recognised as standing with support of the Liberal Party. His seat is regarded as a Liberal seat.)	—	0	0.0	—N/a
Total	34			0	100.0	130,337	100.0	0.0
Registered voters, and turnout						174,892 (Note: Electorate in contested constituencies. The total electorate was 282,242.)	74.5	▼7.7

=== Popular vote ===
Popular vote
Liberal	53.9%
Conservative	31.1%
Liberal Unionist	15.0%

Popular vote (alliances)
Liberal	53.9%
Con-LU	46.1%

=== Parliament seats ===
Parliament seats
Liberal	76.5%
Conservative	17.6%
Liberal Unionist	5.9%

Parliament seats (alliances)
Liberal	76.5%
Con-LU	23.5%

== See also ==
- 1886 United Kingdom general election in England
- 1886 United Kingdom general election in Ireland
- 1886 United Kingdom general election in Scotland
- List of United Kingdom Parliament constituencies (1885–1918) by region
- List of MPs for constituencies in Wales (1886–1892)
