= 1886 Nebraska gubernatorial election =

- November 2, 1886
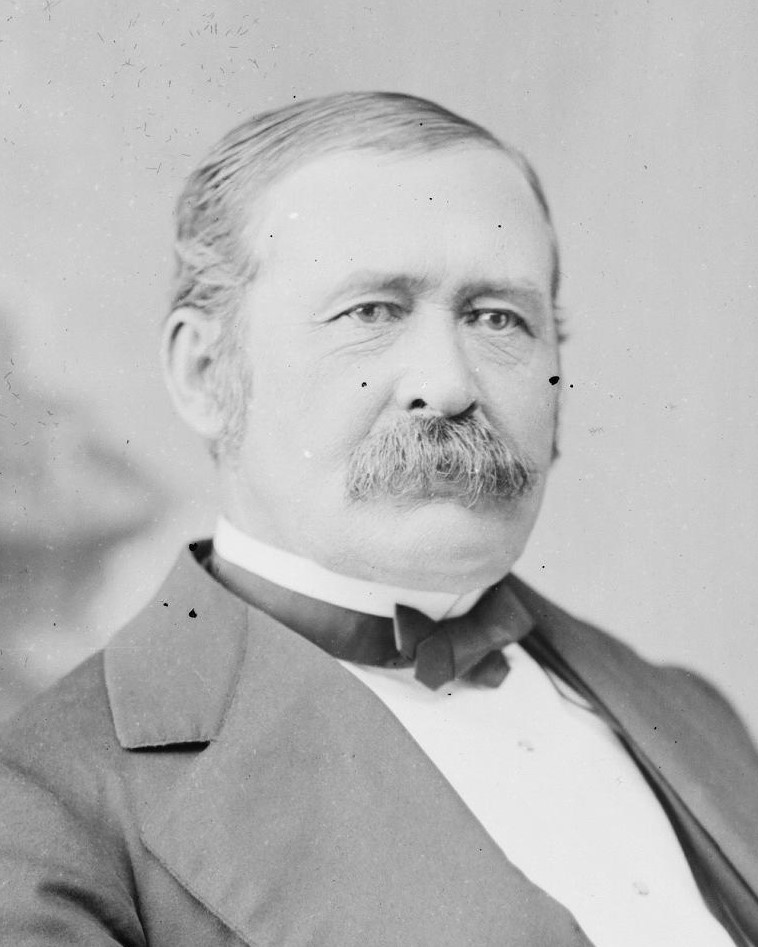

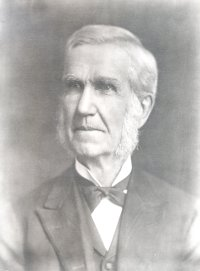
| Nominee | John Milton Thayer | James E. North | Harvey W. Hardy |
| Party | Republican | Democratic | Prohibition |
| Popular vote | 75,956 | 52,656 | 8,175 |
| Percentage | 54.95% | 38.09% | 5.91% |
- County results Thayer: 40–50% 50–60% 60–70% 70–80% 80–90% North: 40–50% 50–60% 60–70% No Data/Votes
Governor before election
James W. Dawes
Republican
Elected Governor
John Milton Thayer
Republican

The 1886 Nebraska gubernatorial election was held on November 2, 1886.

== Details ==
Incumbent Republican governor James W. Dawes did not seek reelection. The two candidates from the major parties were Republican nominee John Milton Thayer, a former United States senator from Nebraska, and Democratic nominee James E. North, the former mayor of Columbus, Nebraska.

Additionally, the Prohibition Party nominated Harvey W. Hardy, a former mayor of Lincoln, Nebraska, and a newly created "National Union" party nominated Jay Burrows, one of its founders from Filley, Nebraska. The National Union Party was founded just prior to the election of 1886 and appears to have been a precursor to the later populist movement in Nebraska. One source refers to the party as the "anti-monopoly party." The party was very closely associated with various figures such as John H. Powers and Charles Van Wyck who were later prominent in the populist movement. Jay Burrows was associated with the Nebraska Farmers' Alliance, which he helped found in Filley, Nebraska in 1880. Burrows later became the founder and editor of The Farmers' Alliance, a publication associated with the Farmers' Alliance movement founded in 1889.

== General election ==
=== Candidates ===
- Jay Burrows, National Union candidate
- Harvey W. Hardy, Prohibition candidate, former mayor of Lincoln, Nebraska, from 1877 to 1879
- James E. North, Democratic candidate, former mayor of Columbus, Nebraska, from 1872 to 1874
- John Milton Thayer, Republican candidate, former Republican United States Senator from Nebraska from 1867 to 1871 and former Governor of Wyoming Territory from 1875 to 1878

=== Results ===
Nebraska gubernatorial election, 1886
| Party | Candidate | Votes | % |
|---|---|---|---|
| Republican | John Milton Thayer | 75,956 | 54.95% |
| Democratic | James E. North | 52,656 | 38.09% |
| Prohibition | Harvey W. Hardy | 8,175 | 5.91% |
| National Union | Jay Burrows | 1,422 | 1.03% |
| Scattering | | 30 | |
| Total votes | | 138,239 | 100.0% |
| Republican hold | | | |

== See also ==
- 1886 Nebraska lieutenant gubernatorial election
