= 1886 Brazilian parliamentary election =

- 15 January 1886

125 members of the Chamber of Deputies
	First party	Second party
Party	Conservative	Liberal
Seats won	103	22
Seat change	▲48	▼45
- Results by Electoral District

Parliamentary elections were held in the Empire of Brazil on 15 January 1886 to elect members of the 20th legislature of the Chamber of Deputies. These were the third direct elections held after the Saraiva Law was enacted (Law No. 3,029 of 9 January 1881) The Conservative Party won 103 seats, the Liberal Party won 22, and the Republican Party won none. The chamber was later dissolved on 17 June 1889, with fresh elections held on 31 August 1889.

== Results ==
Party	Seats	+/–
Conservative Party	103	+48
Liberal Party	22	–45
Paulista Republican Party	0	–3
Total	125	0
Source: Câmara dos Deputados 1889, p. 395

=== Results by province ===
Provinces and Neutral Municipality	Districts	Liberals	Conservatives	Elected votes	Total votes
Alagoas	5	2	3	2,076	3,417
Amazonas	2	–	2	455	752
Bahia	14	–	14	8,442	13,216
Ceará	8	3	5	3,874	5,401
Espírito Santo	2	–	2	833	1,389
Goiás	2	–	2	1,146	1,875
Maranhão	6	–	6	2,056	3,916
Mato Grosso	2	–	2	757	1,238
Minas Gerais	20	11	9	11,229	19,589
Neutral Municipality and Rio de Janeiro	12	–	12	8,446	13,618
Pará	6	–	6	2,433	4,180
Paraíba	5	1	4	2,465	3,845
Paraná	2	1	1	1,193	2,050
Pernambuco	13	1	12	6,519	10,355
Piauí	3	–	3	1,506	3,097
Rio Grande do Norte	2	–	2	1,487	2,234
Rio Grande do Sul	6	1	5	4,663	9,125
Santa Catarina	2	–	2	1,278	2,368
São Paulo	9	2	7	6,746	12,413
Sergipe	4	–	4	1,725	2,803
Source: Câmara dos Deputados 1889, p. 395
