= 1886 United Kingdom general election =

- 1–27 July 1886

All 670 seats in the House of Commons 336 seats needed for a majority
- Registered: 3,734,832 (Note: Electorate in contested constituencies. The total electorate was 5,708,030.)
- Turnout: 2,974,163; 74.2% (▼7.0 pp)
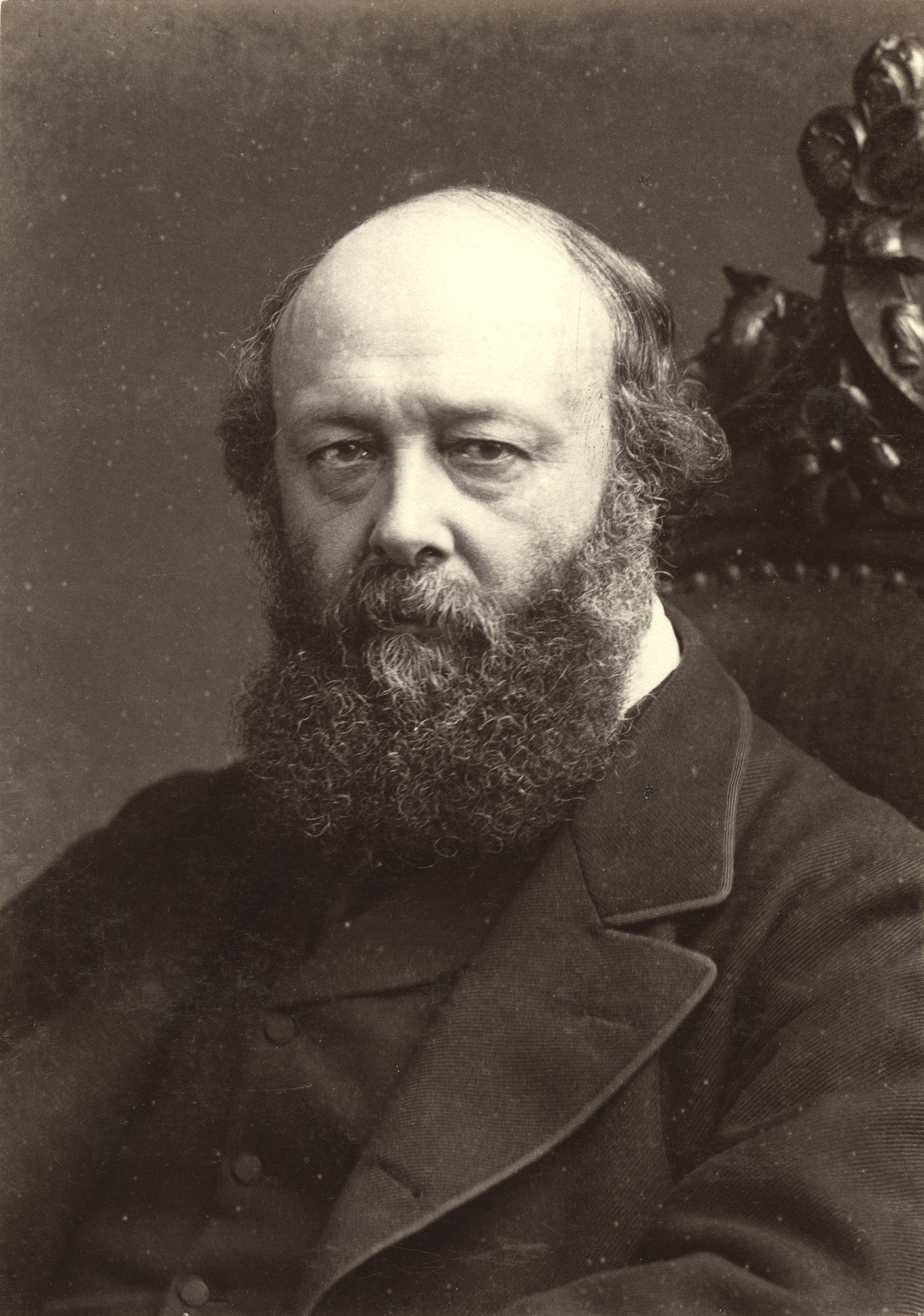

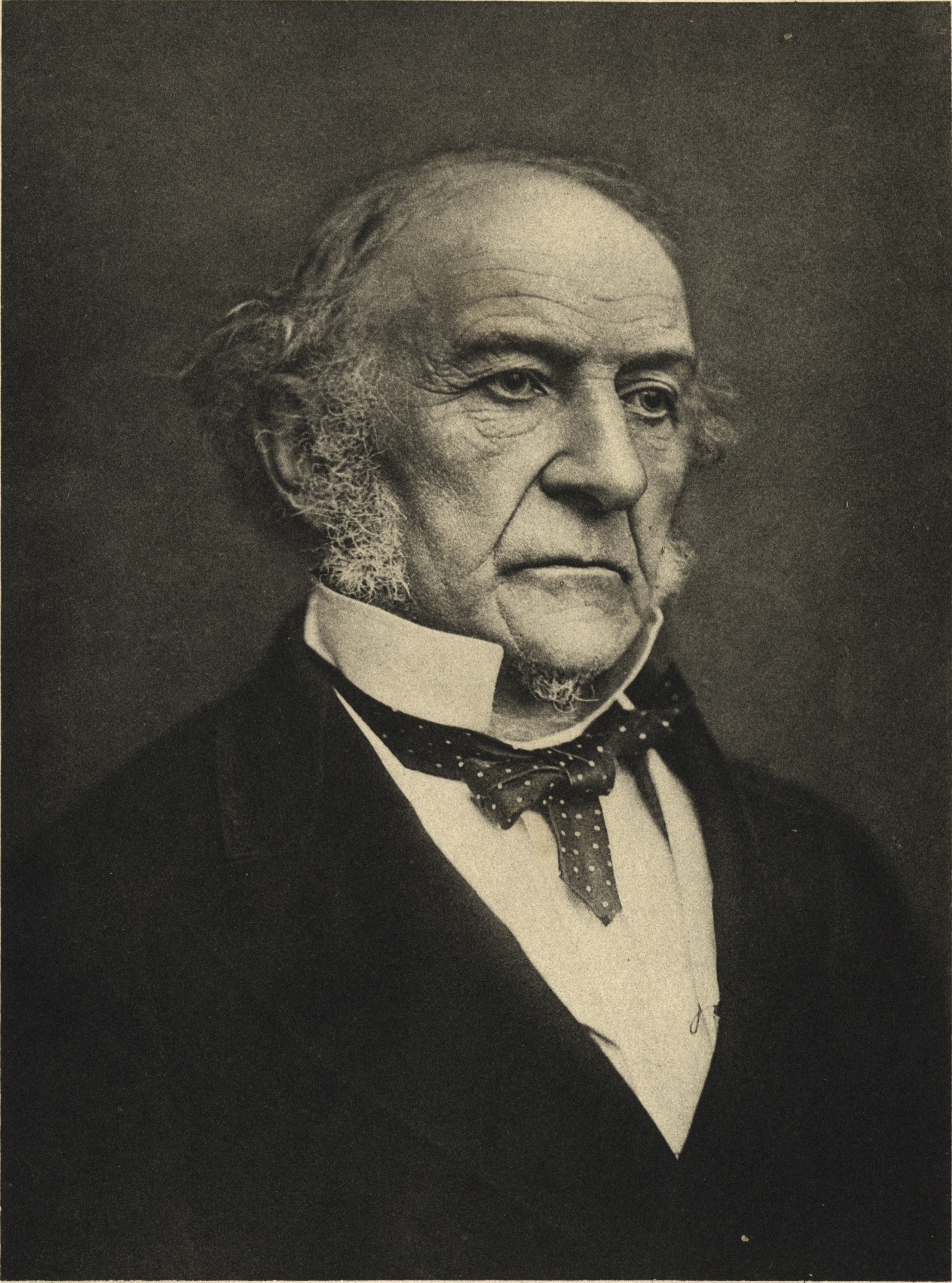

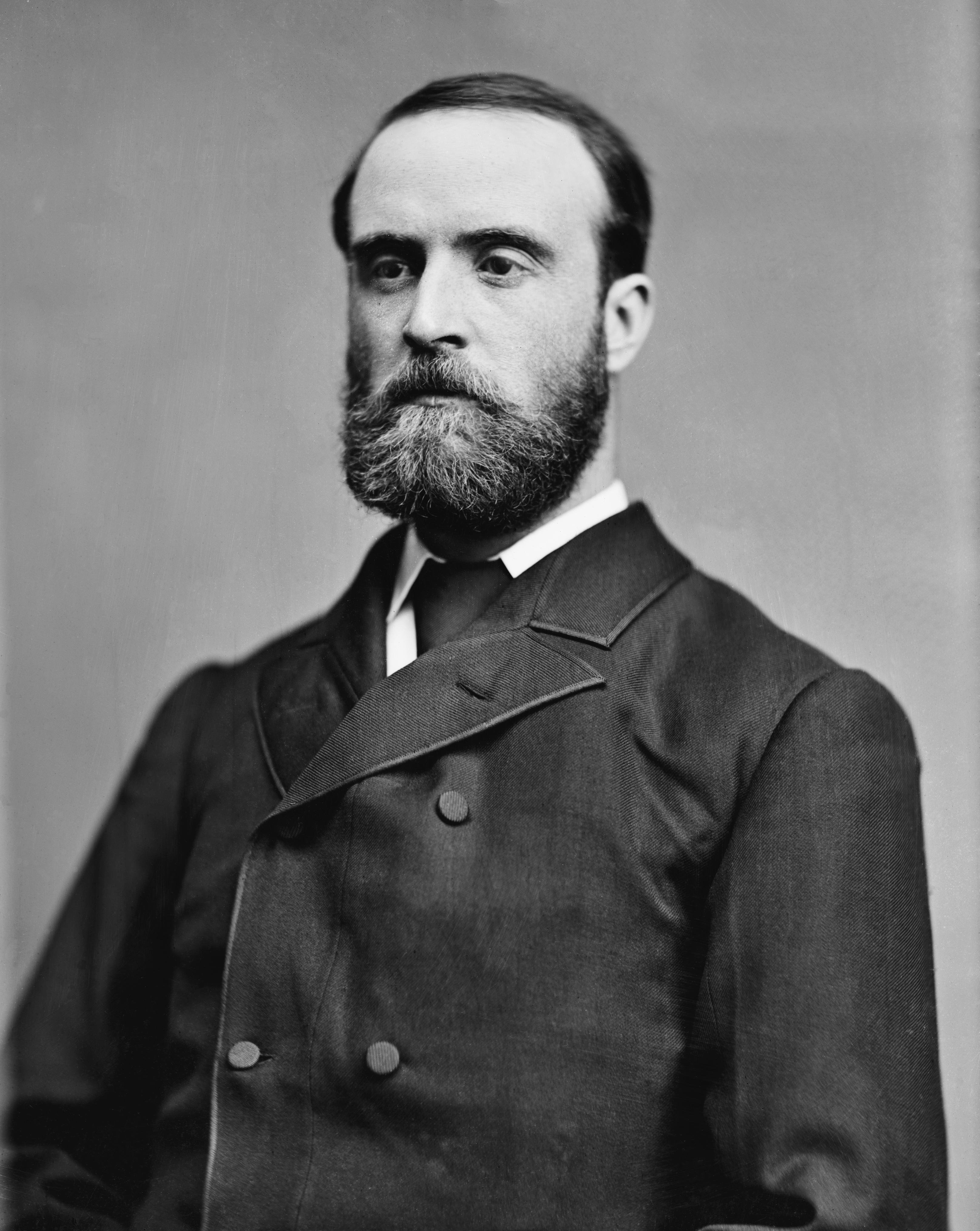

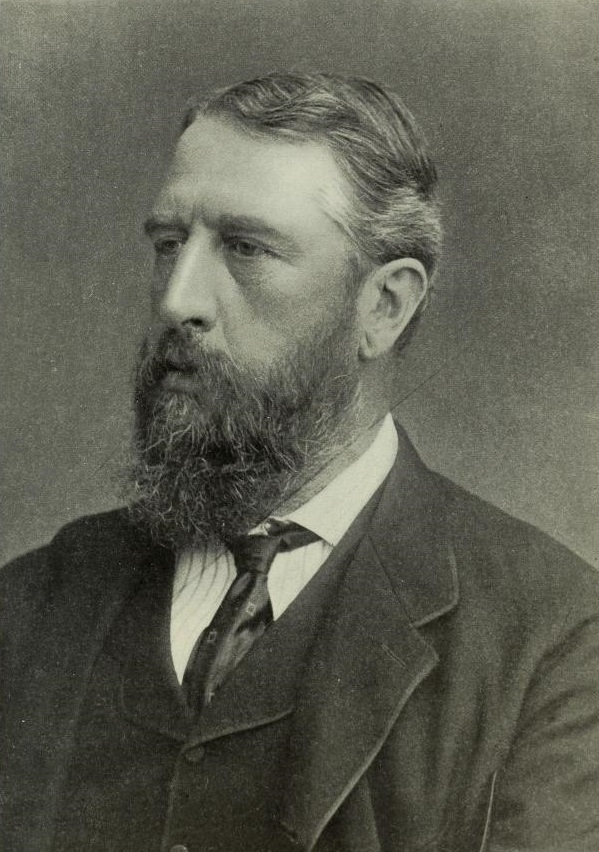
	First party	Second party
Leader	Marquess of Salisbury	William Ewart Gladstone
Party	Conservative	Liberal
Alliance	Conservative-Liberal Unionist
Leader since	April 1881	April 1880
Leader's seat	House of Lords	Midlothian
Last election	247 seats, 43.5%	319 seats, 47.4%
Seats won	317	191
Seat change	▲70	▼128
Popular vote	1,104,495	1,357,381
Percentage	37.4%	45.1%
Swing	▼6.1 pp	▼2.3 pp
	Third party	Fourth party
Leader	Charles Stewart Parnell	Marquess of Harrington
Party	Irish Parliamentary	Liberal Unionist
Alliance		Conservative-Liberal Unionist
Leader since	17 October 1882	1886
Leader's seat	Cork City	Rossendale
Last election	86 seats, 6.9%	Did not stand
Seats won	85	77 (Note: Figure includes Speaker of the House of Commons Arthur Peel in Warwick and Leamington.)
Seat change	▼1	▲77
Popular vote	94,105	416,391
Percentage	3.4%	14.0%
Swing	▼3.5 pp	New party
- Colours denote the winning party

- Diagram displaying the composition of the House of Commons following the general election
Prime Minister before election
William Ewart Gladstone
Liberal
Prime Minister after election
Marquess of Salisbury
Conservative

The 1886 United Kingdom general election took place from 1 to 27 July 1886, following the defeat of the Government of Ireland Bill 1886. It resulted in a major reversal of the results of the 1885 election as the Conservatives, led by Lord Salisbury, were joined in an electoral pact with the breakaway Unionist wing of the Liberals led by Lord Hartington (later the Duke of Devonshire) and Joseph Chamberlain. The new Liberal Unionist party elected 77 members and gave the Conservatives their parliamentary majority, but did not join them in a formal coalition.

William Ewart Gladstone's Liberals, who supported the Irish Home Rule movement, and their sometimes allies the Irish Parliamentary Party, led by Charles Stewart Parnell, were placed a distant second. The split in the Liberal Party ended the period of Liberal dominance. They had held power for 18 of the 27 years since 1859 and won five of the six elections held during that time, but would only be in power for three of the next nineteen years. The political realignment resulting from the Liberal Unionist split also meant that between this election and the end of the Second World War, only one election (in 1906) would result in a party other than the Conservatives forming a majority government (though the Liberals, and later the Labour Party, would form minority governments with support from smaller parties). This was also the first election since the 1841 election in which the Conservatives won a plurality or majority of the popular vote. They would ultimately win at least a plurality of the popular vote in every general election until 1945, again with the exception of the 1906 election.

== Electoral system ==
Most of the MPs were elected through first-past-the-post voting in single-member districts. Conversely, 54 MPs were elected in two-seat districts by the use of plurality block voting, where each voter could cast up to two votes.

== Candidates ==
Below is a table summarising the candidates of the 1886 general election.

Affiliation	Candidates
Liberal Party	451 (Note: Includes 16 Liberal-Labour candidates.)
Conservative Party	403
Liberal Unionist Party	160
Irish Parliamentary Party	98 (Note: Includes candidate T. P. O'Connor, who stood in Liverpool Scotland.)
Independent Liberal Unionist	2 (Note: The candidates that stood were William Pirie Duff in Camberwell North and William Henry Hall in Newmarket.)
Independent Liberal	1 (Note: Candidate Sir John Bennett stood in Cricklade.)
Total	1,115

== Outcome ==
=== Conservative Party ===
In England, the Conservative Party saw a surge in seats across England, despite seeing a relatively sharp 5.6% drop in its vote share. The party stood far fewer candidates than it had in 1885, with it standing 336 candidates in county and borough constituencies, compared with 440 in 1885. Aside multi-member seats, the Conservatives did not stand candidates against its ally, the Liberal Unionist Party, aside in three seats of Torquay, Romford and Petersfield. In Torquay, the sitting Liberal MP Lewis McIver had joined the splitting Liberal Unionists, however was stood against a Conservative candidate despite the parties' alliance against the Liberal Party. The seat was a gain from the Liberal Party. Similarly, in Romford, former Liberal MP John Westlake lost against a Liberal and a Conservative candidate, placing third, with the Conservative Party winning the seat. Lastly, in William Palmer in Petersfield won the seat, following his defection from the Liberals, despite a Conservative standing against him in the constituency.

Nevertheless, the Conservative Party in England saw a net increase of 65 seats despite its fewer candidates and resulting fall in vote share, with 77 gains from the Liberal Party, but also with 12 losses to the Liberals.

In Scotland, there were some exchanges with the Liberals. This was despite the party standing far fewer candidates in Scotland, owing to its alliance with the Liberal Unionists, and therefore suffering a huge 19.5% swing against them as a result. Nevertheless, the Party held the university constituency seats of Edinburgh and St Andrews Universities and Glasgow and Aberdeen Universities. It also held the county and borough seats of Dunbartonshire, West Renfrewshire, Buteshire, Glasgow Govan, Kirkcudbright Stewartry and Wigtownshire. It also won East Renfrewshire, Glasgow Central, South Lanarkshire from the Liberal Party, along with winning Argyllshire from a Liberal-Crofters party sitting MP. Due to gaining 4 seats but losing 2, it received 2-seat net gain in Scotland.

In Wales, the Conservative Party won Carnarvon Boroughs, Pembroke and Haverfordwest and Monmouth Boroughs from the Liberal Party. The Conservative Party also retained Denbigh Boroughs, Radnorshire and South Monmouthshire. As such, with its single loss to the Liberals, the Conservatives took six seats in Wales. Within Ireland, the party saw an increase of 1 from 14 seats to 15 seats.

In Ireland, the Irish Conservative Party vote nearly doubled. The party retained its seats of Belfast North, East Antrim, Mid Antrim, North Antrim, South Antrim, Londonderry City, North Londonderry, North Tyrone, Mid Armagh, North Armagh, East Down, North Down, West Down and its two seats in Dublin University. Additionally, 2 Independent Conservative MPs, Edward de Cobain in Belfast East and William Johnston in Belfast South, joined the party official before the election. Each retained their seats as official Conservatives, and therefore represented gains for the Conservative Party. However, it lost Belfast West to the Irish Parliamentary Party. Therefore, it gained an overall one seat at this election.

Leader of the Conservative Party, the Marquess of Salisbury, won the election and formed a new government nationally, with the support of the Liberal Unionist Party. It would hold this alliance at the constituency and governance levels with the Liberal Unionists throughout the latter's existence.

=== Liberal Unionist Party ===
The newly formed Liberal Unionist Party, under the leadership of former leader of the Liberal Party, the Marquess of Harrington, were successful. The party stood in an alliance with the Conservative Party, which would last until the Liberal Unionist merger with the Conservative Party to form the modern Conservative and Unionist Party in 1912.

In England, the Liberal Unionists saw a vote share of around 11.5% and 55 seats amongst the county and borough constituencies, almost all of which were gains from the Liberal Party, from which it split over the question of Irish Home Rule. The Liberal Unionists won the county and borough constituencies of Bodmin, St Ives, Truro, Barnstaple, South Molton, Tavistock, Totnes, East Somerset, Bristol North, Cirencester, Cricklade, Wilton, Woodstock, Aylesbury, Petersfield, Biggleswade, Mid Norfolk, South Norfolk, Lowestoft, Sudbury, Ludlow, Wellington (Shropshire), Handsworth, Newcastle-under-Lyme, West Staffordshire, Wolverhampton South, Ross, Droitwich, North Worcestershire, North Worcestershire, East Worcestershire, Chesterfield, West Derbyshire, Great Grimsby, Barrow and Furness, Burnley, Bury, Northwich, South East Durham, The Hartlepools, Colne Valley and Skipton. It also won one of the two seats in Bath and Portsmouth, as well as one university constituency seat in London University.

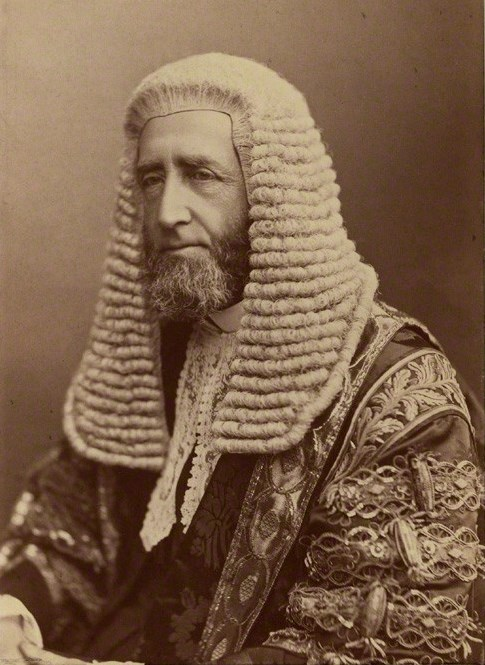
Speaker Arthur Peel, who had defected to the Liberal Unionists

It also won a number of seats in metropolitan borough seats. In Birmingham these were Birmingham Bordesley, Birmingham Central, Birmingham Edgbaston, Birmingham North, Birmingham South and Birmingham West. In Birmingham West, leading figure of the movement and future primary Leader of the Liberal Unionists, Joseph Chamberlain, retained his seat as a Liberal Unionist. Furthermore, it won the metropolitan seats of Islington West (the seat of Richard Chamberlain, Joseph Chamberlain's younger brother) and St Pancras South. It also won Hythe, wherein former Liberal MP, Edward Watkin, who had sat as an Independent Liberal after leaving the party before the 1885 election, joined the new Liberal Unionists for this election. The seat was a gain for the Liberal Unionists. Similarly, in Peterborough, John Wentworth-FitzWilliam, who had sat as an Independent Liberal, joined the Liberal Unionists, and retained the seat.

Amongst its wins, Leader of the Liberal Unionists, the Marquess of Harrington, retained his seat of Rossendale. He would hold the seat for the Liberal Unionists, a gain from his former Liberal Party. As a further upset in this political realignment against the Liberal Party, Speaker of the House of Commons, Arthur Peel, had defected from the Liberal Party to the Liberal Unionists. He retained his seat of Warwick and Leamington, a gain from the Liberal Party, as well as retained his position as Speaker throughout the new Parliament.

In Scotland, some of its seats also came from defecting Independent Liberals, much like what had occurred with the Liberal Party. The sitting Crofters Party and Independent Liberal, Charles Fraser-Mackintosh, retained his seat of Inverness-shire. His gain was from his former party. Similarly, Independent Liberal Henry Torrens Anstruther in St Andrews Burghs joined the Liberal Unionists, retaining his seat personally, but gaining it for the Liberal Unionists. The new party also won, mainly by way of Liberal defectors who joined the splitting party, Inverness Burghs, Forfarshire, West Perthshire, Falkirk Burghs, Greenock, Ayr Burghs, North Ayrshire, South Ayrshire, Edinburgh West, Dumfriesshire, Roxburghshire and Peebles and Selkirk, along with the central Glasgow burgh seats of Glasgow St Rollox, Glasgow Tradeston, and Partick. In total, the new party won 17 seats in Scotland amongst the county and burgh seats. In Wales, former Liberal MP Henry Vivian retained his seat of Swansea District unopposed, representing a gain from the Liberal Party, although would rejoin the Liberal Party before the next election. In West Denbighshire, William Cornwallis-West, also a former Liberal MP, retained his seat unopposed which was also a gain from the Liberal Party. In Ireland, it won South Londonderry and South Tyrone.

Overall, the Liberal Unionists took 77 seats across the country from the Liberal Party, and joined and maintained its alliance with the Conservative Party with which it formed a government, holding a combined 394 seats nationally.

=== Liberal Party ===
The Liberal party saw a collapse in support in England, and Scotland. It lost a net of 117 seats in England, along with its majority vote share. It lost London University wherein John Lubbock, who had also joined the Liberal Unionist Party, retained the seat but gained it from the Liberal Party.

The Liberals did see some gains, however. The party won Camborne and one of the two seats in Newcastle-upon-Tyne from Independent Liberals. Both sitting Independent Liberal MP Charles Conybeare in Camborne had rejoined the Liberal party whip and retained their seats but as a Liberal Party candidate. Further, the Liberals won Wednesbury, Wolverhampton West, Cockermouth, Lancaster, Liverpool Exchange, Manchester North, Manchester South West, Scarborough and Leeds East from the Conservative Party.

In Scotland, although the Liberals held their majority of the seats, when combined with results from across the United Kingdom the election resulted in the defeat of William Ewart Gladstone's government. The party took 61.4% of the vote, thereby retaining its majority vote share, where it had lost this in England but retained this also in Wales. The Liberals took 43 seats, winning 10 but losing 18, to a net loss of 8 seats across Scotland.

The wins in Scotland for the party mainly consisted of sitting Independent Liberal and Crofters Party MPs standing as official Liberal candidates at this election. From the Crofters MPs standing as official Liberal candidates, it wins were Caithness, Ross and Cromarty. From the Independent Liberals standing as official Liberals, it took Wick Burghs, Perth, Kirkcaldy Burghs, along with the Edinburgh burgh seats of Edinburgh Central, Edinburgh East and Edinburgh South.

H. H. Asquith

Further, North West Lanarkshire was won by Cunninghame Graham, a Liberal-Labour candidate, who was sponsored by the Liberal Party and a union. His win was from Conservatives, after he was unsuccessful in the previous election. He was the only Liberal-Labour MP in Scotland, and, as with all of their Liberal-Labour MPs sat with the Liberal Party in the House of Commons. Additionally, the Liberals gained Kilmarnock Burghs from the Conservative Party.

Notably, future Prime Minister of the United Kingdom, H. H. Asquith, entered Parliament in East Fife.

In Wales, the Party also gained Montgomery from the Conservative Party. William Abraham, who had won as an Independent Liberal-Labour candidate in 1885 in Rhondda. As William stood in the support of the Liberal Party, he had been regarded as in effect a winning candidate for the Liberal Party. As such, the Liberal Party had won two seats, however lost five. It remained without representation in Ireland.

== Results ==
The following tables are based on the collations of seats and votes collected by F. W. S. Craig for the results in Great Britain, and seats and votes collected by Brian Mercer Walker for Ireland. The distinctions made between the Conservatives, Irish Unionists and Liberal Unionists in alterations to these works are set out according to Wesley Ferris.

=== Summary of seats returned ===
Party	Leader	MPs		Aggregate votes	
Party	Leader		Of total		Of total (Note: Adjusted for multi-member constituencies.)
Conservative-Liberal Unionist	Marquess of Salisbury	394	58.8%	1,520,886	51.4%
Conservative Party	Marquess of Salisbury	317	47.3%	1,104,495	37.4%
Liberal Unionist Party	Marquess of Harrington	77	11.5%	416,391	14.0%
Liberal Party	William Ewart Gladstone	191 (Note: Includes 10 Liberal-Labour MPs.)	28.5%	1,357,381	45.1%
Irish Parliamentary Party	Charles Stewart Parnell	85 (Note: Includes T. P. O'Connor in Liverpool Scotland.)	12.7%	94,105	3.4%

=== Full results ===

Results of the July 1886 general election to the House of Commons of the United Kingdom
Party	Leader	Candidates	MPs					Aggregate votes		
Party	Leader	Candidates	Total	Gains	Losses	Net	Of total (%)	Total	Of total (%) (Note: Adjusted for multi-member constituencies.)	Change (%)
Conservative-Liberal Unionist	Marquess of Salisbury	563	394	New		▲147	58.8	1,520,886	51.4	New
Conservative	Marquess of Salisbury	403	317	86	16	▲70	47.3	1,104,495	37.4	▼6.1
Liberal Unionist	Marquess of Harrington	160	77	New		▲77	11.5	416,391	14.0	New
Liberal	William Ewart Gladstone	451 (Note: Includes 16 Liberal-Labour candidates.)	191 (Note: Includes 10 Liberal-Labour MPs.)	24	152	▼128	28.5	1,357,381	45.1	▼2.3
Irish Parliamentary	Charles Stewart Parnell	98	85	1 (Note: Belfast West.)	2	▼1	12.6	94,105	0.6	—N/a
Independent; Liberal	—N/a	1	0	0	11	▼11	—	1,247	0.1	▼1.1
Independent Liberal Unionist	—N/a	2	0	New			—	544	0.0	New
Other non-contested		0	0	—N/a		▼7	—	0	0.0	—N/a
Total		1,115	670			0	100.0	2,974,163	100.0	0.0
Registered voters, and turnout								3,734,832 (Note: Electorate in contested constituencies. The total electorate was 5,708,030.)	74.2	▼7.0

=== Vote summary ===
Popular vote
Liberal	45.1%
Conservative	37.4%
Liberal Unionist	14.0%
Irish Parliamentary	3.4%
Others	0.1%

Popular vote (alliances)
Con-LU	51.4%
Liberal	45.1%
Irish Parliamentary	3.4%
Others	0.1%

=== Seats summary ===
Parliamentary seats
Conservative	47.3%
Liberal	28.5%
Irish Parliamentary	12.6%
Liberal Unionist	11.5%

Parliamentary seats (alliances)
Con-LU	58.8%
Liberal	28.5%
Irish Parliamentary	12.6%

== See also ==
- 1886 United Kingdom general election in England
- 1886 United Kingdom general election in Ireland
- 1886 United Kingdom general election in Scotland
- 1886 United Kingdom general election in Wales
- List of United Kingdom Parliament constituencies (1885–1918) by region
- List of MPs elected in the 1886 United Kingdom general election
- List of MPs for constituencies in Wales (1886–1892)
- Parliamentary franchise in the United Kingdom 1885–1918
