= 1886 Texas lieutenant gubernatorial election =

- November 2, 1886
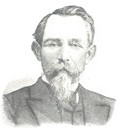

| Nominee | Thomas Benton Wheeler | Lock McDaniel | S. G. Mullins |
| Party | Democratic | Republican | Prohibition |
| Popular vote | 231,950 | 66,536 | 15,392 |
| Percentage | 73.87% | 21.19% | 4.90% |
Lieutenant Governor before election
Barnett Gibbs
Democratic
Elected Lieutenant Governor
Thomas Benton Wheeler
Democratic

The 1886 Texas lieutenant gubernatorial election was held on November 2, 1886, in order to elect the lieutenant governor of Texas. Democratic candidate Thomas Benton Wheeler defeated Republican candidate Lock McDaniel and Prohibition candidate S. G. Mullins.

== General election ==
The incumbent lieutenant governor Democrat Barnett Gibbs declined to run for reelection, choosing instead to run for a congressional seat against Olin Wellborn. (Note: During a deadlocked convention, Gibbs would withdraw his candidacy in favor of Jo Abbott.) At the Democratic party covention several candidates were put forward to replace him. Ultimately, Thomas B. Wheeler secured the nomination.

The Greenback party which had seen success in the state as one of the main opposition parties against the Democrats had lost support and failed to call a convention to nominate any candidates, effectively ending the party's existence in Texas.

The prohibition of alcohol was becoming a major political issue in the state and, after failing to secure a plank in the Democratic party platform calling for a vote on the issue, the Prohibition Party nominated its first slate of statewide candidates.

At the time, Texas was a part of the "Solid South" and the Democratic party was overwhelmingly favored in state elections. On November 2, 1886, Wheeler won the election by an overwhelming margin continuing the Democratic Party's control of the State. He was sworn in as the 16th lieutenant governor of Texas on January 19, 1887.

=== Candidates ===
- Bryan T. Barry, (Democratic) (withdrawn)
- Franklin Lewis Johnston, state senator, lawyer, former state representative, sergeant in the 11th Texas Infantry(Democratic)
- John M. Claiborne, (Democratic) (withdrawn)
- Thomas Benton Wheeler, judge of the 12th Judicial District, former mayor of Austin (1872–1877) (Democrat)
- Lodowick "Lock" McDaniel, former Grimes County judge (Republican)
- S. G. Mullins (Prohibition)

=== Results ===
Texas lieutenant gubernatorial election, 1882
| Party | Candidate | Votes | % | ±% |
|---|---|---|---|---|
| Democratic | Thomas Benton Wheeler | 231,950 | 73.87 | ▼8.29 |
| Republican | Lock McDaniel | 66,536 | 21.19 | ▲3.35 |
| Prohibition | S. G. Mullins | 15,392 | 4.90 | N/A |
| Write-in | | 136 | 0.04 | N/A |
| Total votes | | 314,014 | 100.00 | |
| Democratic hold | | | | |
