= 1886 Wisconsin lieutenant gubernatorial election =

- November 2, 1886
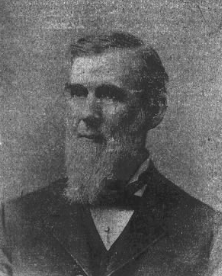

Nominee	George Washington Ryland	John Day Putnam
Party	Republican	Democratic
Popular vote	131,063	116,424
Percentage	45.75%	40.64%
Nominee	George A. Lloyd	Charles Alexander
Party	Union Labor	Prohibition
Popular vote	21,772	17,188
Percentage	7.60%	6.00%
Lieutenant Governor before election
Sam Fifield
Republican
Elected Lieutenant Governor
George Washington Ryland
Republican

The 1886 Wisconsin lieutenant gubernatorial election was held on November 2, 1886, in order to elect the lieutenant governor of Wisconsin. Republican nominee and former member of the Wisconsin Senate George Washington Ryland defeated Democratic nominee and former mayor of River Falls John Day Putnam, Union Labor nominee George A. Lloyd and Prohibition nominee Charles Alexander.

== General election ==
On election day, November 2, 1886, Republican nominee George Washington Ryland won the election by a margin of 14,639 votes against his foremost opponent Democratic nominee John Day Putnam, thereby retaining Republican control over the office of lieutenant governor. Ryland was sworn in as the 15th lieutenant governor of Wisconsin on January 3, 1887.

=== Results ===
Wisconsin lieutenant gubernatorial election, 1886
Party	Candidate	Votes	%
Republican	George Washington Ryland	131,063	45.75
Democratic	John Day Putnam	116,424	40.64
Union Labor	George A. Lloyd	21,772	7.60
Prohibition	Charles Alexander	4,308	1.35
	Scattering	31	0.01
Total votes		286,478	100.00
Republican hold			
