= 1886 United Kingdom general election in Scotland =

- 1–27 July 1886

All 72 Scottish seats to the House of Commons
- Turnout: 72.3% (▼9.7 pp)
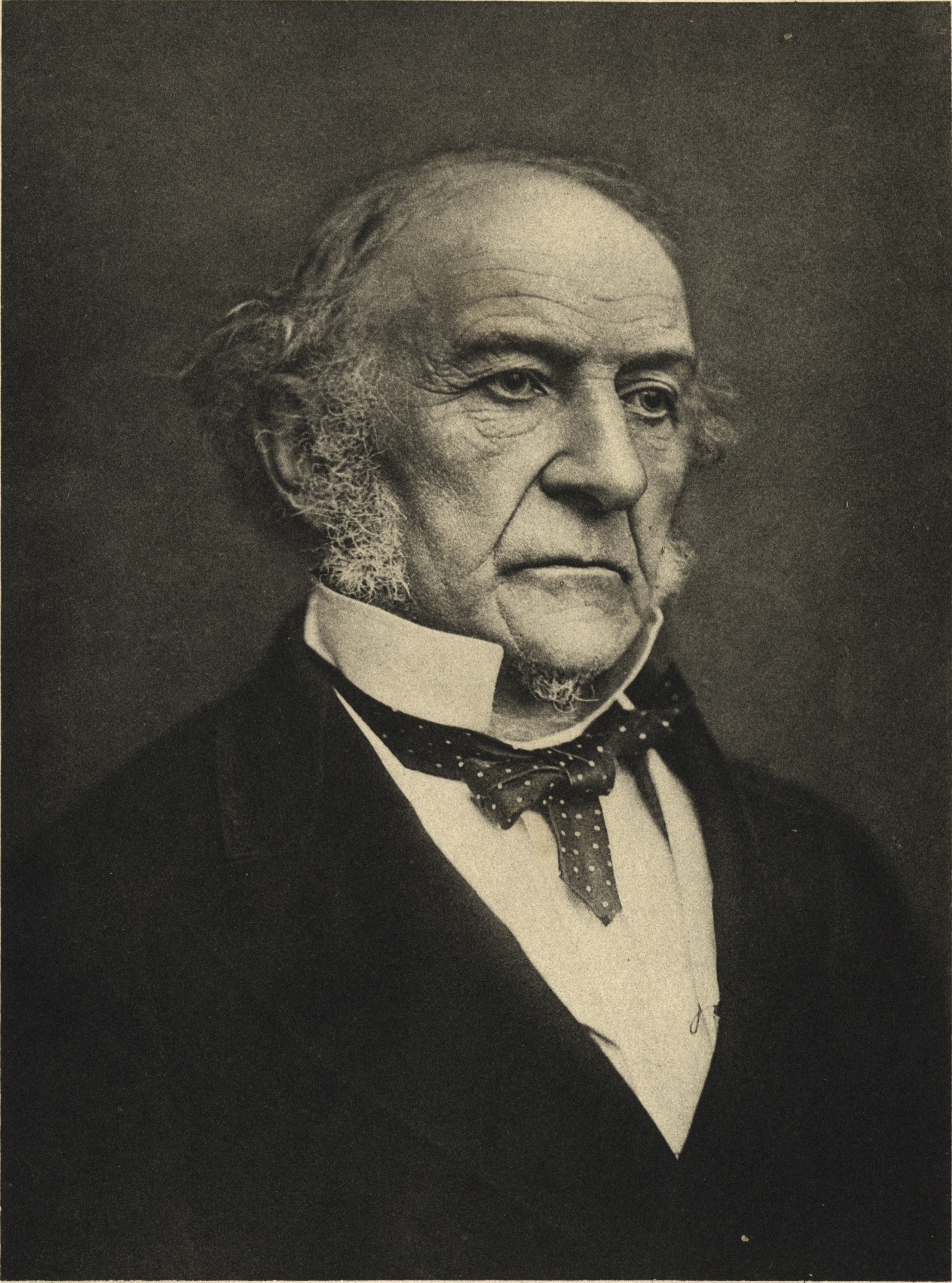

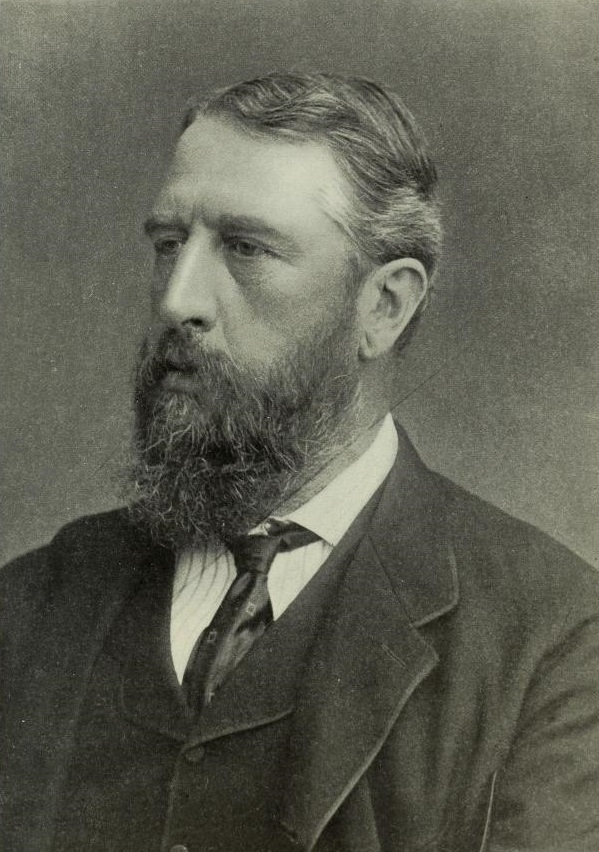

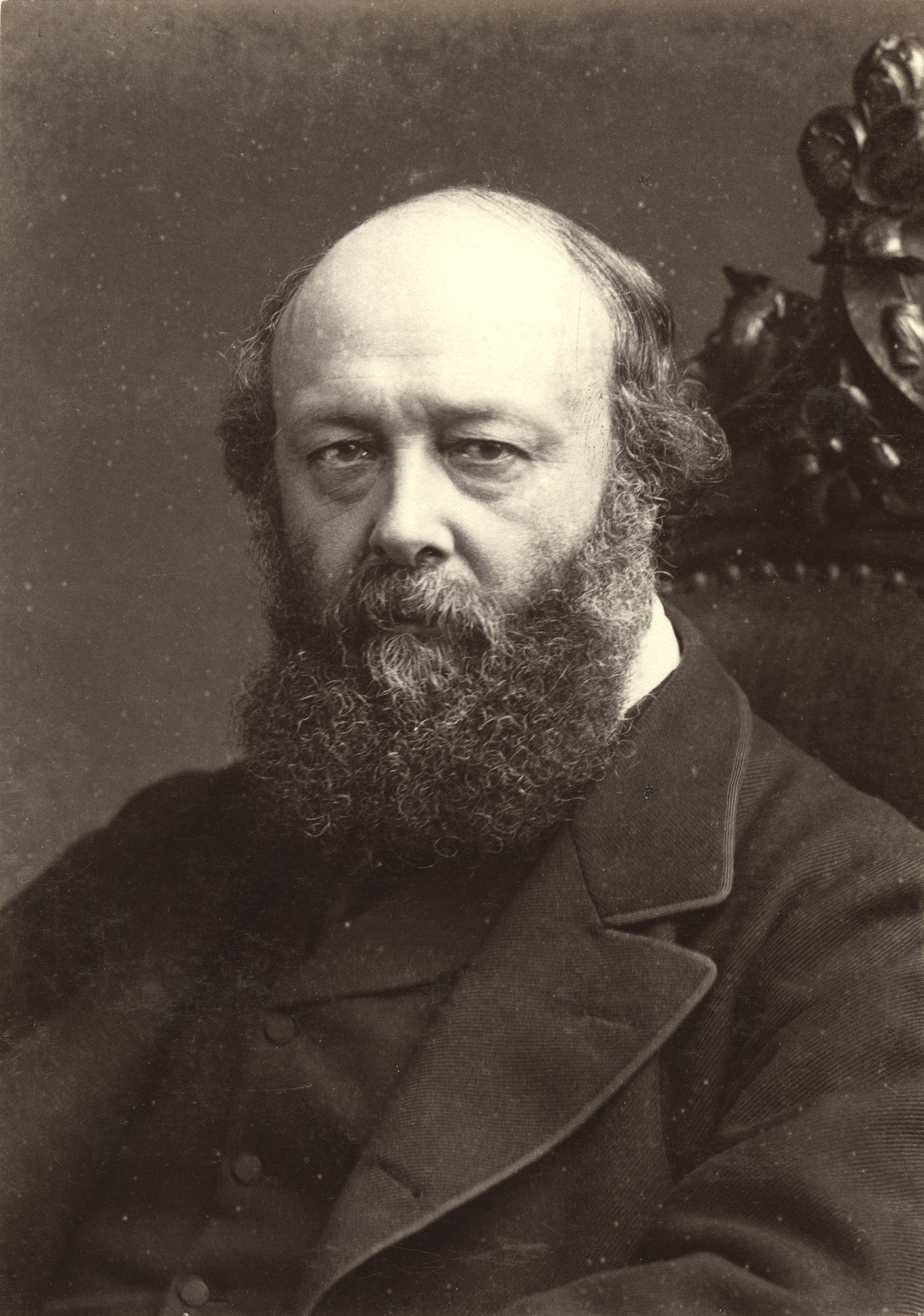
	First party	Second party	Third party
Leader	William Ewart Gladstone	Marquess of Harrington	Marquess of Salisbury
Party	Liberal	Liberal Unionist	Conservative
Alliance	Liberal	Conservative-Liberal Unionist	Conservative-Liberal Unionist
Leader since	April 1880	1886	April 1881
Leader's seat	Midlothian	Rossendale	House of Lords
Last election	51 seats, (Note: Combined results for burgh, county and university seats) 53.3%	Did not contest	10 seats, 34.3%
Seats won	43	17	12
Seat change	▼8	▲17	▲2
Popular vote	193,801 (Note: Total and percentage votes given here are for territorial constituencies only)	111,208	53,106
Percentage	53.6%	31.6%	14.8%
Swing	▲0.3%	New party	▼19.5%
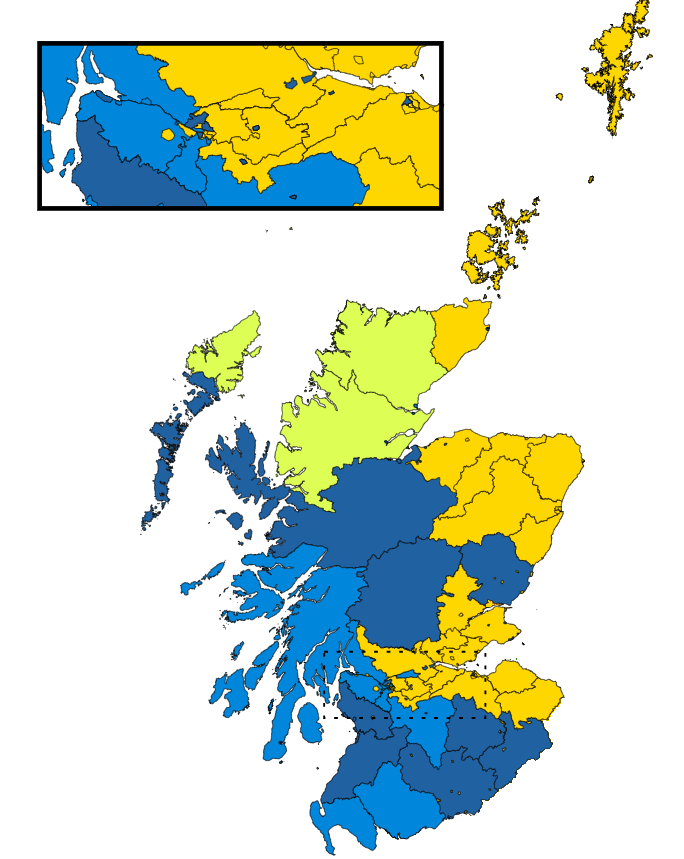

The 1886 United Kingdom general election was held in the United Kingdom over the period from 1 to 27 July 1886, and members were returned for all Scottish seats. Scotland was allocated 72 seats in total, with 70 territorial seats, comprising 32 burgh constituencies and 37 county constituencies. (Note: One burgh seat, Dundee, was represented by two members of parliament.) There were also two university constituencies, Glasgow and Aberdeen Universities and Edinburgh and St Andrews Universities. As voters in university constituencies voted in addition to their territorial vote, the results are compiled separately.

The election was called following the defeat of the Government of Ireland Bill 1886, which led to a split in the Liberal party: Liberals who did not support Home Rule for Ireland formed the breakaway Liberal Unionist Party. The election in Scotland was effectively fought between two blocs, as the Conservatives did not put up candidates against sitting Liberal Unionist MPs, whilst the Liberals did not oppose sitting Crofters Party MPs even where they did not take the Liberal whip (several Crofters candidates elected in 1885 had been endorsed by Liberals prior to election, or had since become fully aligned with them).

Although the Liberals won a majority of the seats in Scotland, when combined with results from across the United Kingdom the election resulted in the defeat of William Ewart Gladstone's government. Although the Liberal Unionists did not formally join with the Conservatives, in practice the two groups acted together to control a parliamentary majority in the House of Commons.

== Candidates ==
Below is a table summarising the candidates of the 1886 general election in Scotland, excluding those in the university constituencies.

Affiliation	Candidates
Scottish Liberal Party	68 (Note: Includes Liberal Labour candidates James Samuelson in East Renfrewshire and Cunninghame Graham in North West Lanarkshire; and Crofters Party candidates Donald Horne Macfarlane in Argyllshire, Gavin Brown Clark in Caithness, Roderick Macdonald in Ross and Cromarty and Angus Sutherland in Sutherland.)
Liberal Unionist Party	46
Conservative Party	17
Total	131

== Analysis ==
=== Liberal ===
Although the Liberals won a majority of the seats in Scotland, when combined with results from across the United Kingdom the election resulted in the defeat of William Ewart Gladstone's government. Although the Liberal Unionists did not formally join with the Conservatives, in practice the two groups acted together to control a parliamentary majority in the House of Commons. The party took 61.4% of the vote, thereby retaining its majority vote share, where it had lost this in England but retained this also in Wales. The Liberals took 43 seats, winning 10 but losing 18, to a net loss of 8 seats across Scotland.

The wins for the party mainly consisted of sitting Independent Liberal and Crofters Party MPs standing as official Liberal candidates at this election. From the Crofters MPs standing as official Liberal candidates, it wins were Caithness, Ross and Cromarty. From the Independent Liberals standing as official Liberals, it took Wick Burghs, Perth, Kirkcaldy Burghs, along with the Edinburgh burgh seats of Edinburgh Central, Edinburgh East and Edinburgh South.

H. H. Asquith

Further, North West Lanarkshire was won by Cunninghame Graham, a Liberal-Labour candidate, who was sponsored by the Liberal Party and a union. His win was from Conservatives, after he was unsuccessful in the previous election. He was the only Liberal-Labour MP in Scotland, and, as with all of their Liberal-Labour MPs sat with the Liberal Party in the House of Commons. Additionally, the Liberals gained Kilmarnock Burghs from the Conservative Party.

Notably, future Prime Minister of the United Kingdom, H. H. Asquith, entered Parliament in East Fife. Asquith stood against the incumbent MP John Boyd Kinnear, who had been one of the several sitting Liberal MPs who had joined and stood as a Liberal Unionist candidate. Asquith would hold the seat until the 1918 general election. Also of note, Leader of the Liberal Party, William Ewart Gladstone, was elected in two seats ––Midlothian and Leith Burghs–– but chose to sit in Midlothian. A by-election had held in Leith Burghs in which Liberal Ronald Munro Ferguson won, and took the seat.

Overall, with its respective 18 losses from the Conservative Party, and the Liberal Unionist Party, which had split from the Liberal Party over Irish Home Rule, the Liberal lost an overall 8 seats in Scotland.

=== Liberal Unionist Party ===
The newly formed Liberal Unionist Party, under the leadership of former leader of the Liberal Party, Marquess of Harrington, were successful across England and the United Kingdom as a whole. The party stood in an alliance with the Conservative Party, which would last until the Liberal Unionist merger with the Conservative Party to form the modern Conservative and Unionist Party in 1912. The party had split from the Liberal Party following opposition amongst the Liberal faction opposed to Irish Home Rule.

Some of its seats came from defecting Independent Liberals, much like what had occurred with the Liberal Party. The sitting Crofters Party and Independent Liberal, Charles Fraser-Mackintosh, retained his seat of Inverness-shire. His gain was from his former party. Similarly, Independent Liberal Henry Torrens Anstruther in St Andrews Burghs joined the Liberal Unionists, retaining his seat personally, but gaining it for the Liberal Unionists.

The new party also won, mainly by way of Liberal defectors who joined the splitting party, Inverness Burghs, Forfarshire, West Perthshire, Falkirk Burghs, Greenock, Ayr Burghs, North Ayrshire, South Ayrshire, Edinburgh West, Dumfriesshire, Roxburghshire and Peebles and Selkirk, along with the central Glasgow burgh seats of Glasgow St Rollox, Glasgow Tradeston, and Partick. In total, the new party won 17 seats in Scotland amongst the county and burgh seats.

=== Conservative Party ===
The Conservative party under the Marquess of Salisbury saw success also in Scotland. Although it lost some seats to the Liberal Party, it took others from the Liberals. This was despite the party standing far fewer candidates in Scotland, owing to its alliance with the Liberal Unionists, and therefore suffering a huge 19.5% swing against them as a result. Nevertheless, the Party held the university constituency seats of Edinburgh and St Andrews Universities and Glasgow and Aberdeen Universities. It also held the county and borough seats of Dunbartonshire, West Renfrewshire, Buteshire, Glasgow Govan, Kirkcudbright Stewartry and Wigtownshire.

It also won East Renfrewshire, Glasgow Central, South Lanarkshire from the Liberal Party, along with winning Argyllshire a Liberal-Crofters party sitting MP. Due to gaining 4 seats but losing 2, it received 2-seat net gain in Scotland.

Unlike what was seen in Wales and England, the Conservative Party actually stood fewer candidates in Scotland, and as such saw fewer seats and vote share than its allies, the Liberal Unionists. Leader of the Conservative Party, the Marquess of Salisbury, won the election and formed a new government nationally, with the support of the Liberal Unionist Party. It would hold this alliance at the constituency and governance levels with the Liberal Unionists throughout the latter's existence.

== Seats summary ==
Below is a table summarising the total number of seats, gains and losses for each party in both the territorial county and burgh constituencies and the university constituencies.

Party	Seats				
Party	Total	Gains	Losses	Net	Of all (%)
Liberal	43 (Note: Includes 1 Liberal Labour MP and 2 Crofters Party MPs, aligned with the Liberal Party as its candidates at this election.)	10	18	▼8	59.7
Conservative-Liberal Unionist	29	New		▲19	40.3
Liberal Unionist	17	New		▲17	23.6
Conservative	12	4	2	▲2	16.7
Other non-contested	0	—N/a		▼11 (Note: 4 Crofters Party seats, although 2 retained their seats as Liberal Party candidates in Ross and Cromarty and Caithness; 7 Independent Liberal seats, although several retained their seats as official Liberal Party and Liberal Unionist Party candidates.)	—
Total	72				

== County and burgh constituency results ==
Party	Seats					Aggregate votes		
Party	Total	Gains	Losses	Net	Of total (%)	Total	Of total (%) (Note: Adjusted for multi-member constituencies.)	Change (%)
Liberal	43 (Note: Includes 1 Liberal Labour MP and 2 Crofters Party MPs, aligned with the Liberal Party as its candidates at this election.)	10	18	▼8	61.4	193,801	53.6	▲0.3
Conservative-Liberal Unionist	27	New		▲19	38.6	164,314	46.4	New
Liberal Unionist	17	New		▲17	24.3	111,208	31.6	New
Conservative	10	4	2	▲2	14.3	53,106 (Note: Adding up the 17 candidates in Scotland in 1886 gives a total of 53,196, which is 90 more votes than the combined Liberal-Unionist count given in Craig and Thrasher.)	14.8	▼19.5
Other non-contested	0	—N/a		▼11 (Note: 4 Crofters Party seats, although 2 retained their seats as Liberal Party candidates in Ross and Cromarty and Caithness; 7 Independent Liberal seats, although several retained their seats as official Liberal Party candidates and Liberal Unionist Party.)	—	0	0.0	—N/a
Total	70			0	100.0	358,115	100.0	0.0
Registered voters, and turnout						479,808 (Note: Electorate in contested constituencies. The total electorate was 560,580.)	72.3	▼9.7

=== Popular vote ===
Popular vote
Liberal	53.6%
Liberal Unionist	31.6%
Conservative	14.8%

Popular vote (alliances)
Liberal	53.6%
Con-LU	46.4%

=== Parliament seats ===
Parliament seats
Liberal	59.7%
Liberal Unionist	23.6%
Conservative	16.7%

Parliament seats (alliances)
Liberal	59.7%
Con-LU	40.3%

== University constituencies ==
The two university constituencies each elected an additional member to the house. In this election both seats were uncontested, with the sitting members being returned unopposed.

=== Edinburgh and St Andrews Universities ===
General election 1886: Edinburgh and St Andrews Universities
Party	Candidate	Votes	%	±%
Conservative	John Macdonald	Unopposed		
Conservative hold				

=== Glasgow and Aberdeen Universities ===
General election 1886: Glasgow and Aberdeen Universities
Party	Candidate	Votes	%	±%
Conservative	James Alexander Campbell	Unopposed		
Conservative hold				

== See also ==
- 1886 United Kingdom general election in England
- 1886 United Kingdom general election in Ireland
- 1886 United Kingdom general election in Wales
- List of United Kingdom Parliament constituencies (1885–1918) by region
