= 1886 Nebraska lieutenant gubernatorial election =

- November 2, 1886
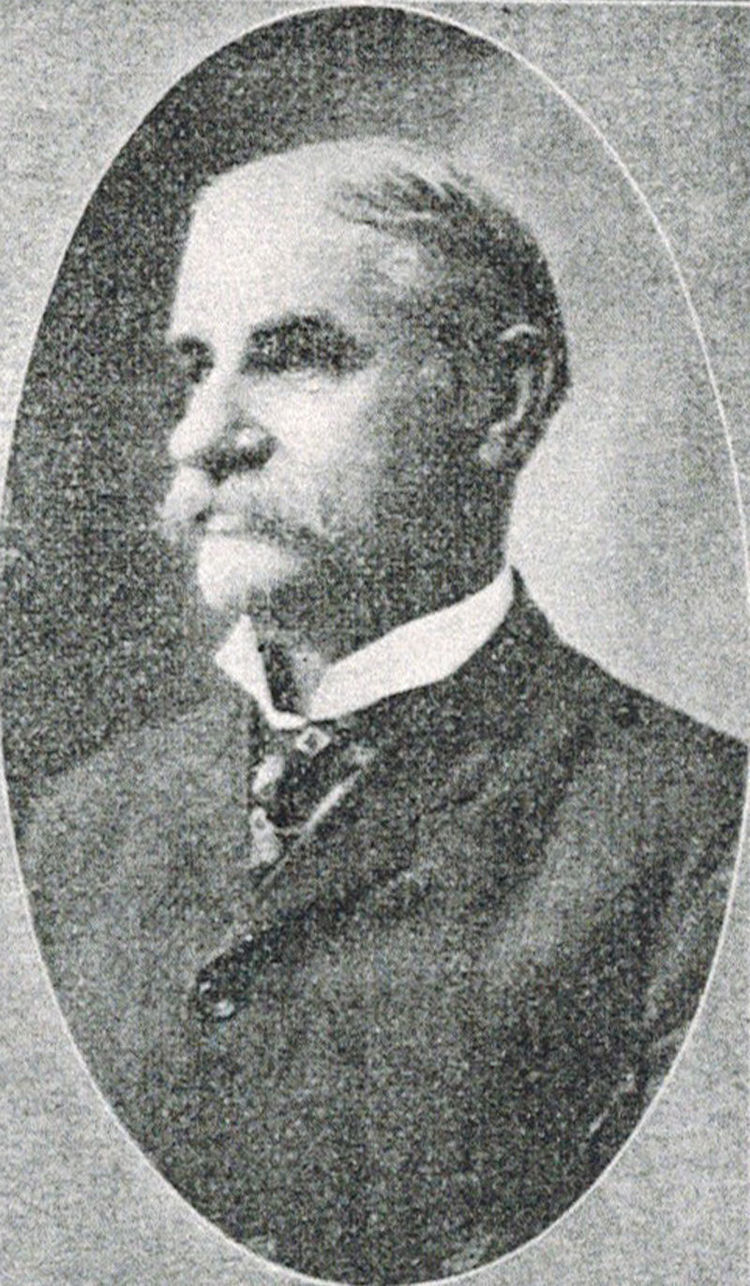

Nominee	Hibbard H. Shedd	Charles J. Bowlby	E. B. Graham
Party	Republican	Democratic	Prohibition
Popular vote	75,177	53,509	8,204
Percentage	54.3%	38.7%	5.9%
Lieutenant Governor before election
Hibbard H. Shedd
Republican
Elected Lieutenant Governor
Hibbard H. Shedd
Republican

The 1886 Nebraska lieutenant gubernatorial election was held on November 2, 1886, and featured incumbent Nebraska Lieutenant Governor Hibbard H. Shedd, a Republican, defeating Democratic nominee Charles J. Bowlby as well as Prohibition Party nominee E. B. Graham and National Union Party nominee M. K. Lewis.

The National Union Party was founded just prior to the election of 1886 and appears to have been a precursor to the later populist movement in Nebraska. One source refers to the party as the "anti-monopoly party." The party was very closely associated with various figures such as John H. Powers and Charles Van Wyck who were later prominent in the populist movement.

== General election ==
=== Candidates ===
- Charles J. Bowlby, Democratic candidate, Democratic nominee for Nebraska Secretary of State in 1882, president of the Saline County Agricultural Society, and lawyer from Crete, Nebraska
- Rev. E. B. Graham, Prohibition candidate, chairman of the Prohibition Party, and pastor of First Presbyterian Church in Omaha, Nebraska
- M. K. Lewis, National Union candidate, chairman of the Nebraska National Union Party, first mayor of Hastings, Nebraska, and president of the company M. K. Lewis and Sons as well as the newly formed Hastings Manufacturing Company
- Hibbard H. Shedd, Republican candidate, incumbent Nebraska Lieutenant Governor and former Speaker of the Nebraska House of Representatives from 1881 to 1883 from Ashland, Nebraska

=== Results ===
Nebraska lieutenant gubernatorial election, 1886
Party	Candidate	Votes	%
Republican	Hibbard H. Shedd (incumbent)	75,177	54.32
Democratic	Charles J. Bowlby	53,509	38.66
Prohibition	E. B. Graham	8,204	5.93
National Union	M. K. Lewis	1,481	1.07
Scattering		25	
Total votes		138,396	100.00
Republican hold			

== See also ==
- 1886 Nebraska gubernatorial election
