= 1886 United Kingdom general election in Ireland =

- 1–27 July 1886

103 seats for Ireland of the 670 seats in the House of Commons
- Turnout: 79.8% (▲4.8 pp)
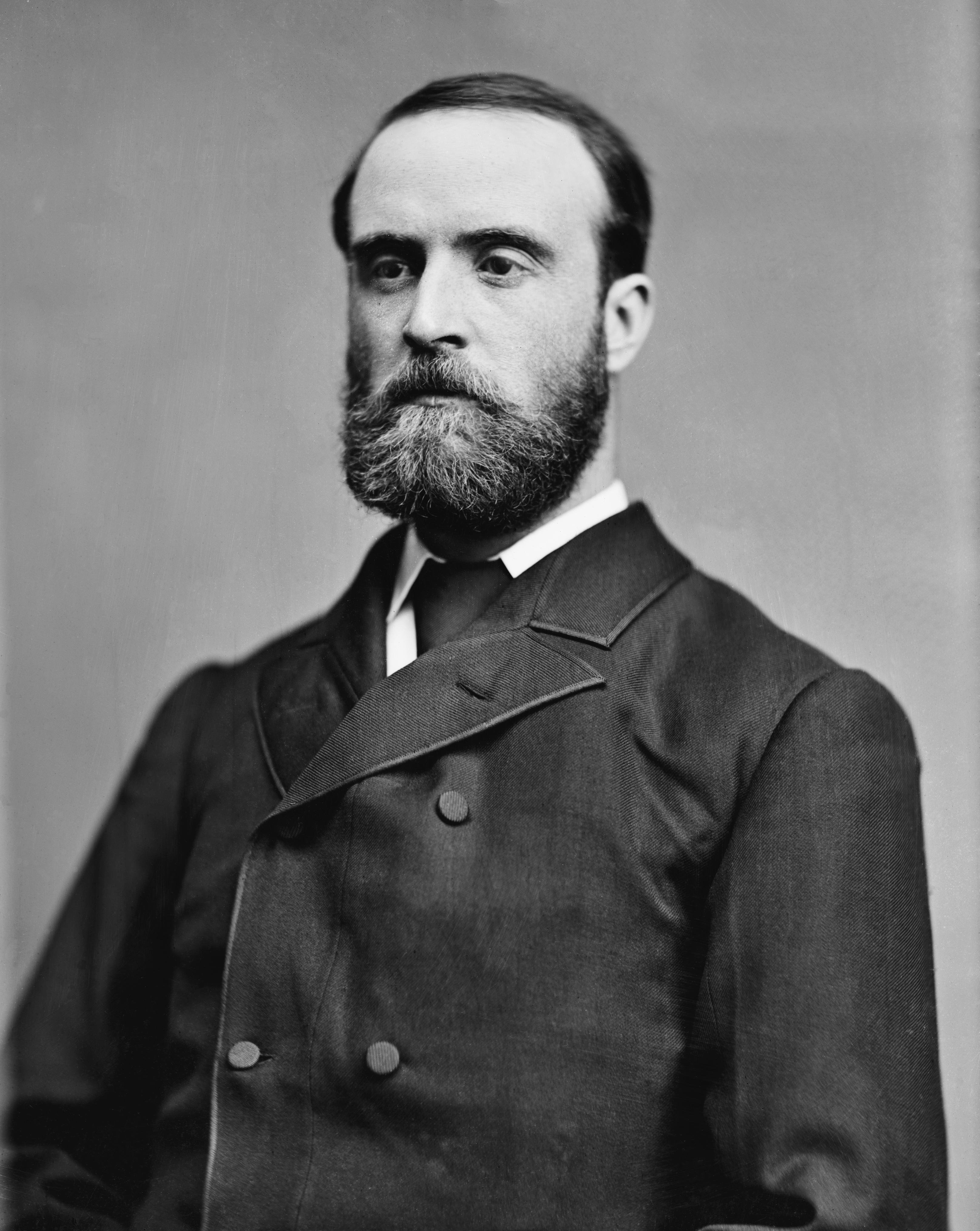

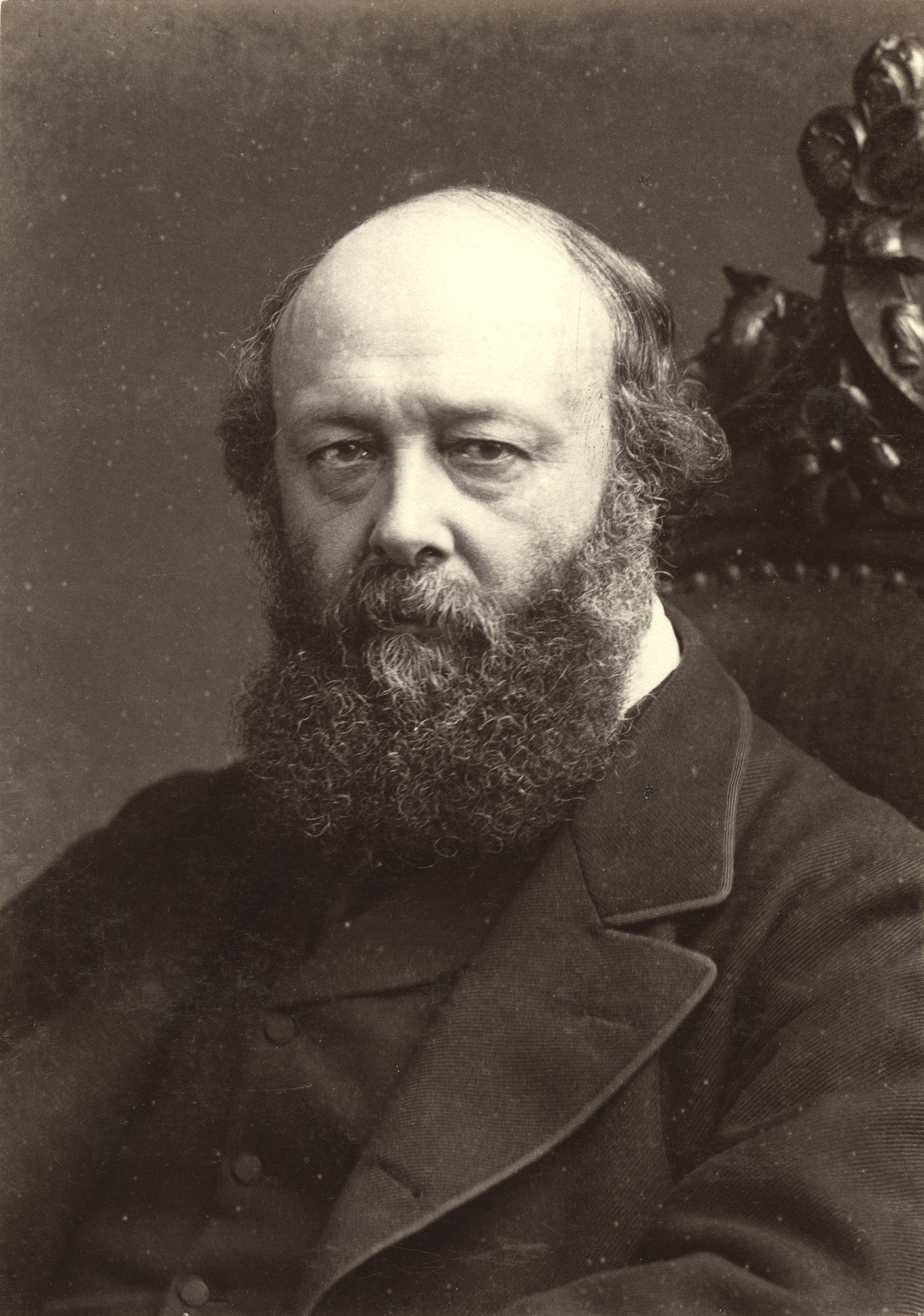

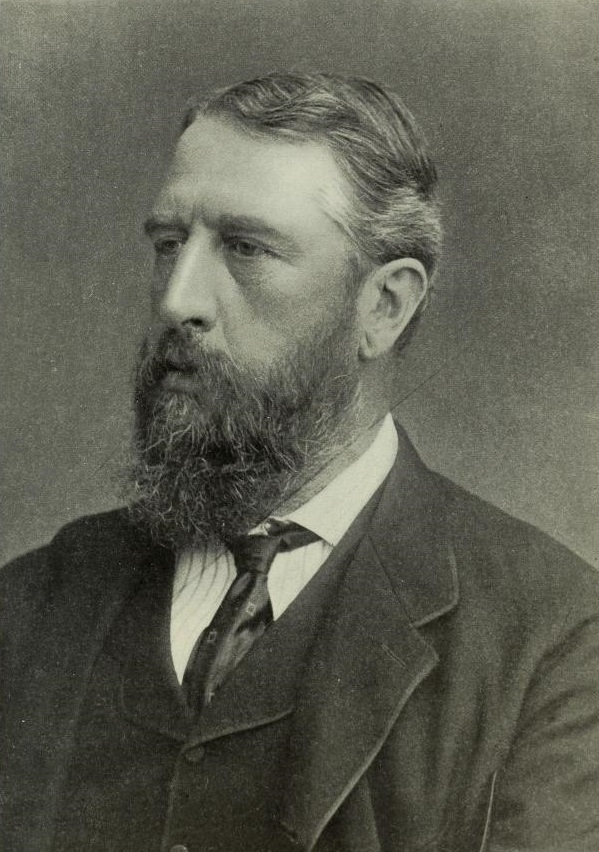

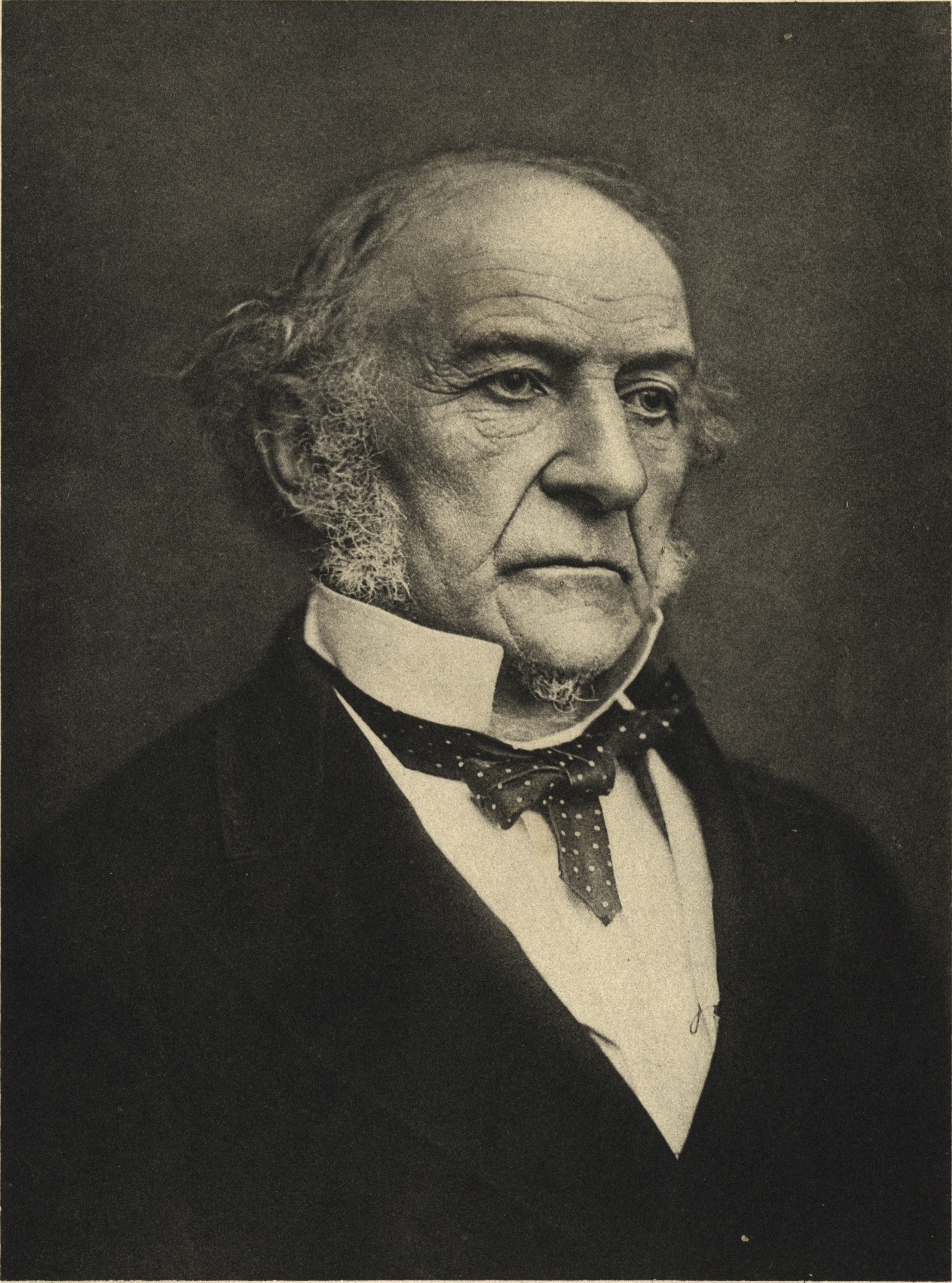
	First party	Second party
Leader	Charles Stewart Parnell	Marquess of Salisbury
Party	Irish Parliamentary	Conservative
Alliance		Conservative-Liberal Unionist
Leader since	17 October 1882	April 1881
Leader's seat	Cork City	House of Lords
Last election	85 seats, 66.9%	16 seats, 23.1%
Seats won	84	17
Seat change	▼1	▲1
Popular vote	91,083	76,257
Percentage	46.7%	39.1%
Swing	▼20.2%	▲16.0%
	Third party	Fourth party
Leader	Marquess of Harrington	William Ewart Gladstone
Party	Liberal Unionist	Liberal
Alliance	Conservative-Liberal Unionist
Leader since	1886	April 1880
Leader's seat	Rossendale	Midlothian
Last election	Did not stand	0 seats, 6.7%
Seats won	2	0
Seat change	▲2	Steady
Popular vote	21,944	5,710
Percentage	11.3%	2.9%
Swing	New party	▼3.8%

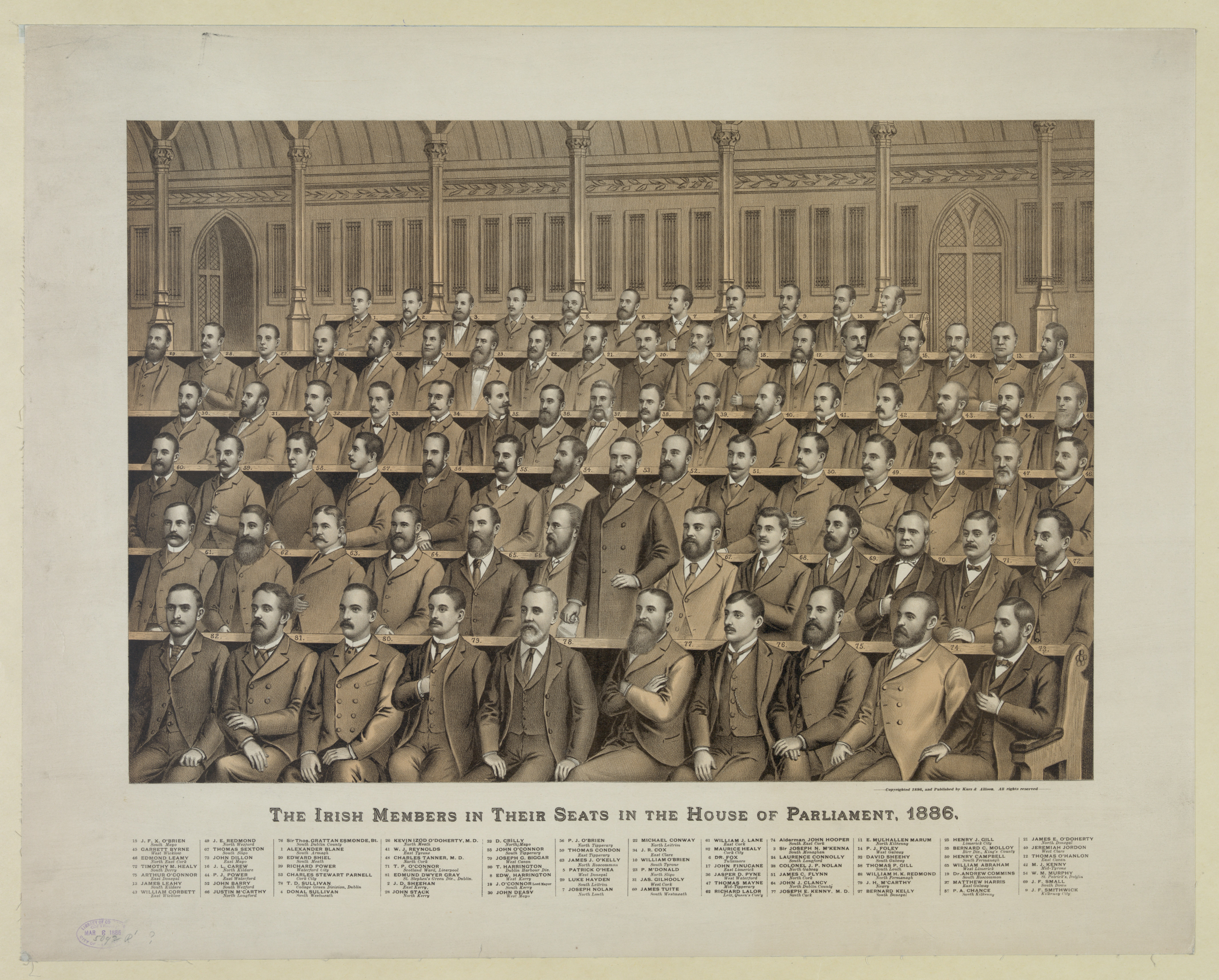
Irish Parliamentary Party MPs elected in 1886.

From 1 to 27 July 1886, the 1886 United Kingdom general election was held in Ireland, to elect all 670 members of the House of Commons. Of the 670 seats in the House of Commons, 103 were in Ireland; 101 represented 100 county and borough territorial constituencies, with 2 seats representing Cork City; and two additional seats represented the Dublin University wherein only graduates of the university could vote. All county and borough seats were contest via first-past-the-post voting, with Dublin University being contested under Plurality block voting.

The election came about as a result of the Liberal Party's resignation of Government and request for a parliamentary dissolution after a defeat in the House of Commons on the Government of Ireland Bill 1886, a major defeat within the Irish Home Rule movement. The Liberal Party support also brought a major split within the Liberals, leading the creation the Liberal Unionist Party under the leadership of Marquess of Harrington. The Liberal Unionists entered a broad alliance with the Conservative Party which would last until the Liberal Unionist merger into the latter political party in 1912.

In response to Gladstone's attempt to implement Home Rule a unionist wing of the Liberals broke off to found the Liberal Unionist Party, which entered into an alliance with the Conservatives in an effort to block any attempt to implement Home Rule. The party won seats in Ireland with the Conservatives. Nonetheless, the Irish Parliamentary Party maintained its position as the largest party in Ireland.

== Candidates ==
Below is a table summarising the candidates of the 1886 general election in Ireland, excluding those who stood in the University constituency of Dublin University.

Affiliation	Candidates
Irish Parliamentary Party	95
Irish Conservative Party	28
Liberal Unionist Party	7 (Note: The candidates that stood were Sir Edward Sullivan, 2nd Baronet in Dublin St Stephen's Green, Matthew George Megaw in East Tyrone, Reginald Cantley Saunders in Newry, Joseph Todhunter Pim in South Dublin, Robert Swan Corbitt in South Down, Sir Thomas Lea in South Londonderry, and Sir Thomas Russell in South Tyrone.)
Liberal Party	3 (Note: The candidates that stood were James Hamilton McKelvey in Mid Antrim, Samuel Craig McElroy in North Antrim and James Owens Wylie in North Tyrone.)
Total	133

== Analysis ==
The Irish Liberal Party, having lost all seats in the 1885 election, saw its share of the vote further plummet to 3.0% with the party only standing three candidates.

In comparison, the relative share of the vote enjoyed by the Irish Conservative Party nearly doubled. This is explained by the fact that in this election, most southern Irish seats were uncontested as opposed to the previous year, so the Irish Parliamentary Party had no contests in seats they were popular and won in walkovers. The party retained its seats of Belfast North, East Antrim, Mid Antrim, North Antrim, South Antrim, Londonderry City, North Londonderry, North Tyrone, Mid Armagh, North Armagh, East Down, North Down, West Down and its two seats in Dublin University.

Additionally, 2 Independent Conservative MPs, Edward de Cobain in Belfast East and William Johnston in Belfast South, joined the party official before the election. Each retained their seats as official Conservatives, and therefore represented gains for the Conservative Party. However, it lost Belfast West to the Irish Parliamentary Party. Therefore, it gained an overall one seat at this election.

The newly-formed Liberal Unionist Party, which had split from the Liberal party over the question of Irish Home rule, gained two seats. These were South Londonderry and South Tyrone. Both gains were from the Irish Parliamentary Party.

Despite a drop in their relative share of the vote the Parliamentary party only lost one seat, with the bulk of their seats – 66 – being unopposed. In total the Parliamentary party stood some 97 candidates, the Conservatives 30 (three of whom were unopposed).

== County and borough results ==
Party	Leader	Seats					Aggregate votes		
Party	Leader	Total	Gains	Losses	Net	Of total (%)	Total	Of total (%) (Note: Adjusted for multi-member constituencies.)	Change (%)
Irish; Parliamentary	Charles Stewart Parnell	84	1	2	▼1	83.2	91,083	46.7	▼20.2
Irish Conservative	Lord; Salisbury	15	2	1	▲1	14.9	76,257	39.1	▲16.0
Liberal Unionist	Joseph; Chamberlain	2	New		▲2	2.0	21,944	11.3	New
Liberal	William Ewart; Gladstone	0	0	0	Steady	—	5,710	2.9	▼3.8
Total		101			0	100.0	194,994	100.0	0.0
Registered voters, and turnout							244,415 (Note: Electorate in contested constituencies. The total electorate was 737,965.)	79.8	▲4.8

=== Popular vote ===
Popular vote
IPP	46.7%
Conservative	39.1%
Liberal Unionist	11.3%
Liberal	2.9%

Popular vote (alliances)
Con-LU	50.4%
IPP	46.7%
Liberal	2.9%

=== Parliament seats ===
Parliamentary seats
IPP	83.2%
Conservative	14.9%
Liberal Unionist	2.0%

Parliamentary seats (alliances)
IPP	83.2%
Con-LU	16.9%

== Dublin University constituency result ==
1886 general election: Dublin University (2 seats)
Party	Candidate	Votes	%	±%
Conservative	David Plunket	1,865	48.7	N/A
Conservative	Hugh Holmes	1,855	48.4	N/A
Irish Parliamentary	Hugh Herbert Johnston	56	1.5	New
Irish Parliamentary	Edward Patrick Sarsfield Counsell	55	1.4	New
Majority		1,799	46.9	N/A
Turnout		1,916 (est)	46.1 (est)	N/A
Registered electors		4,155		
Conservative hold		Swing	N/A	
Conservative hold		Swing	N/A	

== See also ==
- 1886 United Kingdom general election in England
- 1886 United Kingdom general election in Scotland
- 1886 United Kingdom general election in Wales
- List of United Kingdom Parliament constituencies (1885–1918) by region
- History of Ireland (1801–1923)
