= North Worcestershire (constituency) =

Parliamentary constituency in the United Kingdom, 1885–1918

- Former county constituency for the House of Commons

1885–1918
- Seats: one
- Replaced by: Stourbridge and Kidderminster

North Worcestershire was a county constituency in the county of Worcestershire, which returned one Member of Parliament (MP) to the House of Commons of the Parliament of the United Kingdom, elected by the first past the post voting system.

It was created by the Redistribution of Seats Act 1885 for the 1885 general election. The constituency was abolished for the 1918 general election.

== Boundaries ==
The constituency included the Sessional Divisions of Halesowen and Oldbury, the Municipal Borough of Dudley, and the parishes of Cradley, Lutley, Lye, and Northfield.

== Members of Parliament ==
| Election | Member | Party |
|---|---|---|
| 1885 | Benjamin Hingley | Liberal |
| 1886 | Benjamin Hingley | Liberal Unionist |
| 1892 | Benjamin Hingley | Liberal |
| 1895 | John William Wilson | Liberal Unionist |
| 1903 | John William Wilson | Liberal |
| 1918 | constituency abolished | |

== Elections ==
=== Elections in the 1880s ===
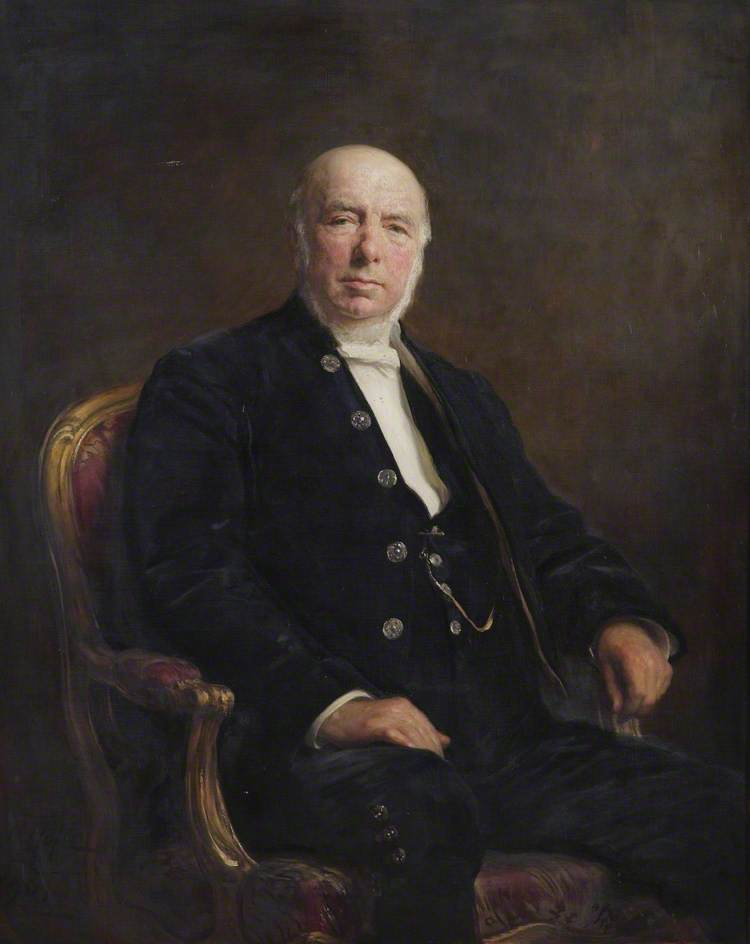
Sir Benjamin Hingley

General election 1885: North Worcestershire
| Party | Candidate | Votes | % | ±% |
|---|---|---|---|---|
| Liberal | Benjamin Hingley | 5,774 | 72.8 | |
| Conservative | John Willis-Bund | 2,155 | 27.2 | |
| Majority | | 3,619 | 45.6 | |
| Turnout | | 7,929 | 75.0 | |
| Registered electors | | 10,573 | | |
| Liberal win (new seat) | | | | |

General election 1886: North Worcestershire
| Party | Candidate | Votes | % | ±% |
|---|---|---|---|---|
| Liberal Unionist | Benjamin Hingley | Unopposed | | |
| Liberal Unionist gain from Liberal | | | | |

=== Elections in the 1890s ===
General election 1892: North Worcestershire
| Party | Candidate | Votes | % | ±% |
|---|---|---|---|---|
| Liberal | Benjamin Hingley | 5,329 | 62.7 | N/A |
| Conservative | William Bridgeman | 3,171 | 37.3 | N/A |
| Majority | | 2,158 | 25.4 | N/A |
| Turnout | | 8,500 | 79.1 | N/A |
| Registered electors | | 10,744 | | |
| Liberal gain from Liberal Unionist | | Swing | N/A | |

John Wilson

General election 1895: North Worcestershire
| Party | Candidate | Votes | % | ±% |
|---|---|---|---|---|
| Liberal Unionist | John Wilson | 5,012 | 55.5 | +18.2 |
| Liberal | Robert Waite | 4,024 | 44.5 | −18.2 |
| Majority | | 988 | 11.0 | N/A |
| Turnout | | 9,036 | 80.6 | +1.5 |
| Registered electors | | 11,209 | | |
| Liberal Unionist gain from Liberal | | Swing | +18.2 | |

=== Elections in the 1900s ===
General election 1900: North Worcestershire
| Party | Candidate | Votes | % | ±% |
|---|---|---|---|---|
| Liberal Unionist | John Wilson | Unopposed | | |
| Liberal Unionist hold | | | | |

General election 1906: North Worcestershire
| Party | Candidate | Votes | % | ±% |
|---|---|---|---|---|
| Liberal | John Wilson | 6,908 | 51.8 | N/A |
| Liberal Unionist | William Campion | 6,429 | 48.2 | N/A |
| Majority | | 479 | 3.6 | N/A |
| Turnout | | 13,337 | 84.8 | N/A |
| Registered electors | | 15,732 | | |
| Liberal gain from Liberal Unionist | | Swing | N/A | |

=== Elections in the 1910s ===
General election January 1910: North Worcestershire
| Party | Candidate | Votes | % | ±% |
|---|---|---|---|---|
| Liberal | John Wilson | 8,272 | 51.0 | −0.8 |
| Liberal Unionist | William Campion | 7,953 | 49.0 | +0.8 |
| Majority | | 319 | 2.0 | −1.6 |
| Turnout | | 16,225 | 89.1 | +4.3 |
| Registered electors | | 18,200 | | |
| Liberal hold | | Swing | -0.8 | |

General election December 1910: North Worcestershire
| Party | Candidate | Votes | % | ±% |
|---|---|---|---|---|
| Liberal | John Wilson | 7,894 | 50.9 | −0.1 |
| Conservative | D. T. Timins | 7,625 | 49.1 | +0.1 |
| Majority | | 269 | 1.8 | −0.2 |
| Turnout | | 15,519 | 85.3 | −3.8 |
| Registered electors | | 18,200 | | |
| Liberal hold | | Swing | −0.1 | |

General Election 1914–15:

Another General Election was required to take place before the end of 1915. The political parties had been making preparations for an election to take place and by July 1914, the following candidates had been selected;

- Liberal: John Wilson
- Unionist:
