= 1895 United Kingdom general election in England =

- 13 Jul. – 7 Aug. 1895

All 461 English seats to the House of Commons
- Turnout: 79.2% (▲0.5 pp)
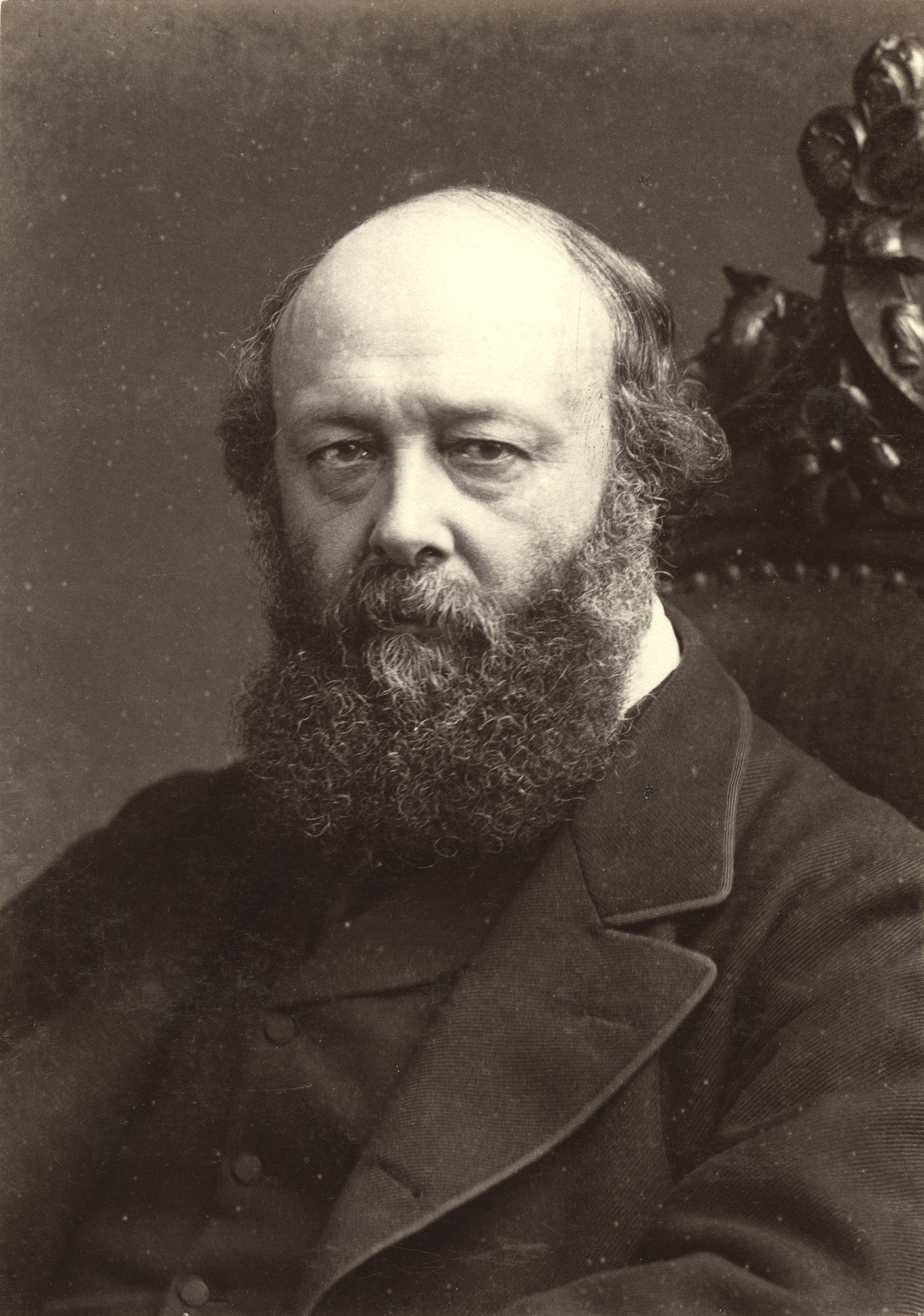

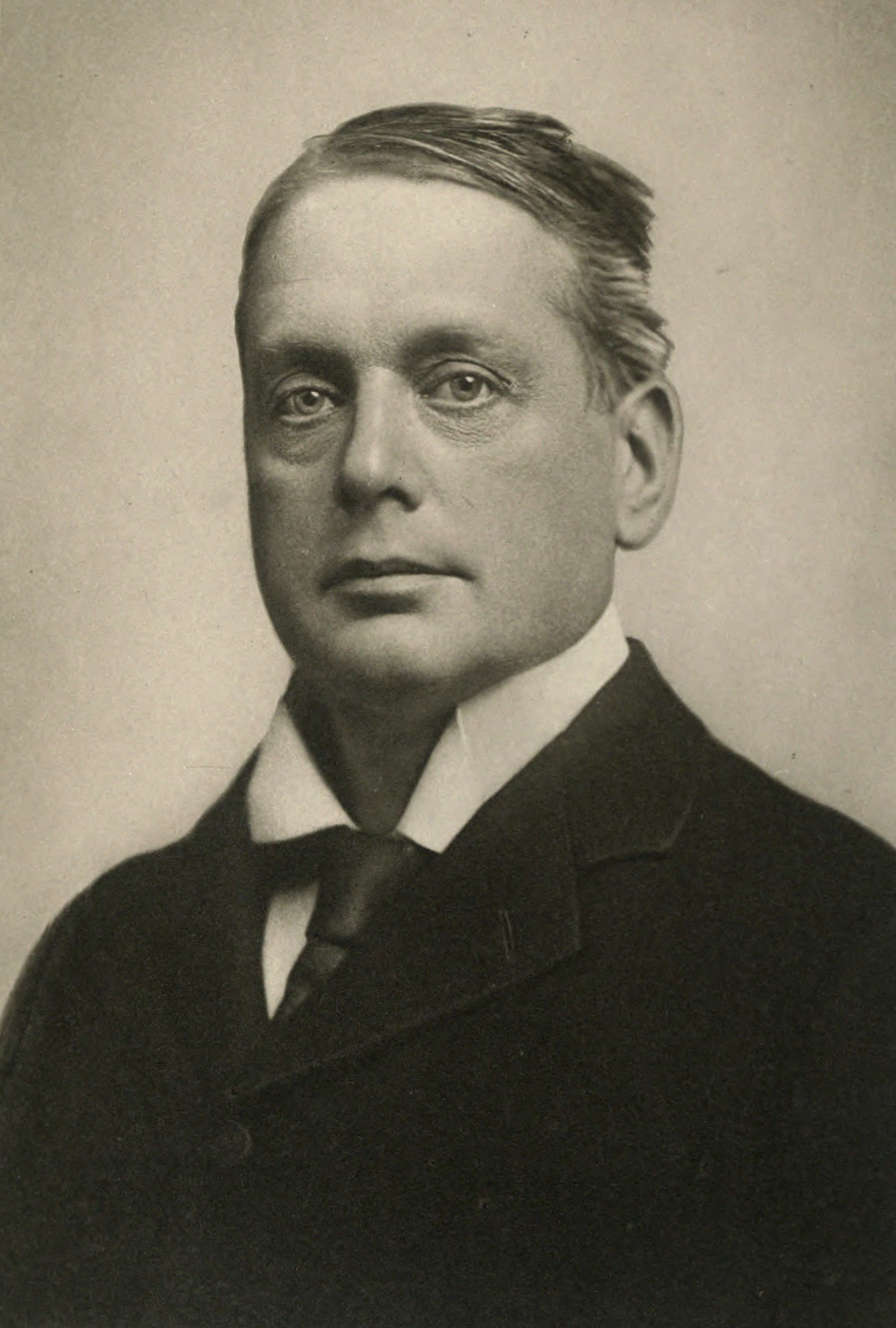

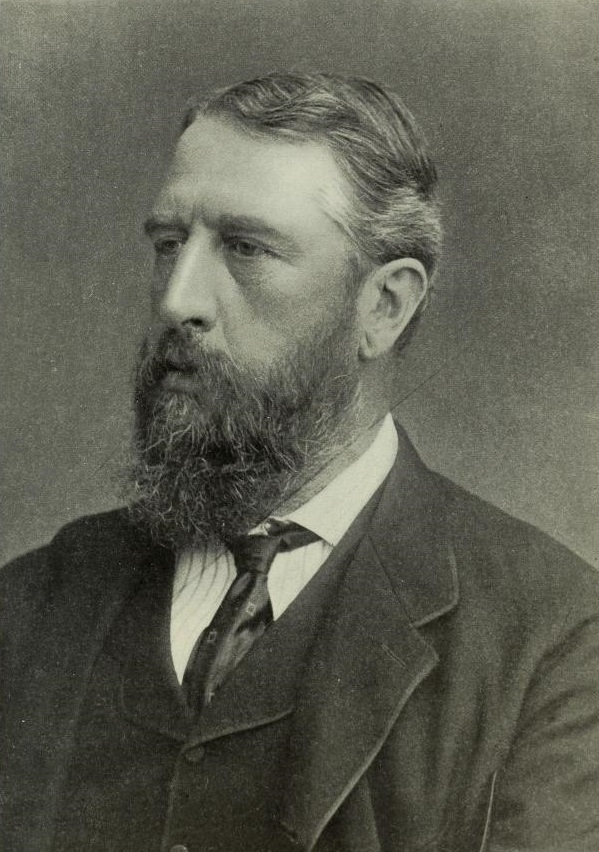

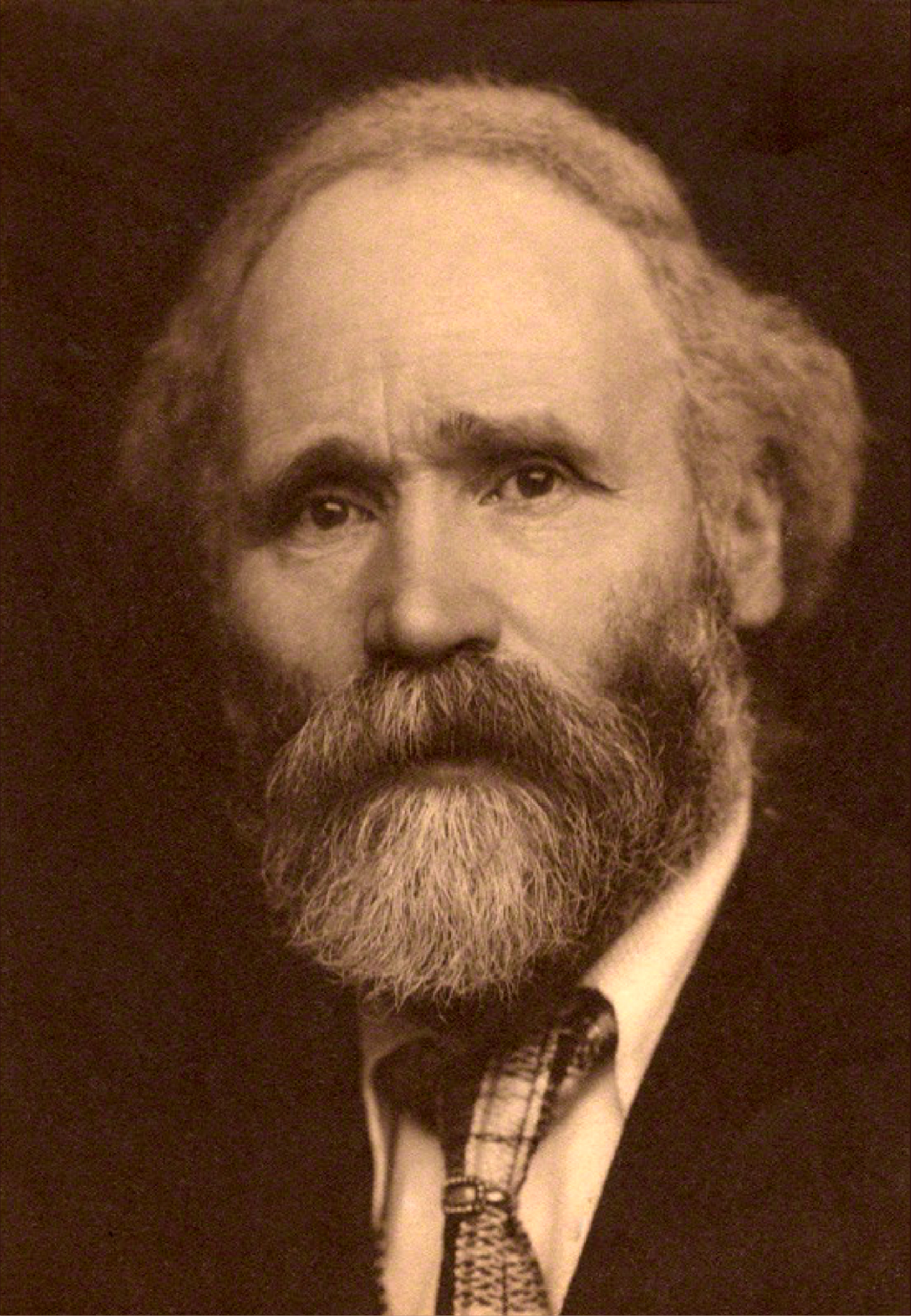
	First party	Second party
Leader	Marquess of Salisbury	Earl of Rosebery
Party	Conservative	Liberal
Alliance	Conservative-Liberal Unionist
Leader since	April 1881	5 March 1894
Leader's seat	House of Lords	House of Lords
Last election	235 seats, (Note: Combined results for borough, county and university seats) 42.2%	190 seats, 48.0%
Seats won	296	112 (Note: Figure includes Speaker of the House of Commons William Court Gully in Carlisle.)
Seat change	▲61	▼78
Popular vote	1,285,213 (Note: Total and percentage votes given here are for territorial constituencies only)	1,369,598
Percentage	43.8%	46.7%
Swing	▲1.6 pp	▼1.3 pp
	Third party	Fourth party
Leader	Duke of Devonshire	Keir Hardie
Party	Liberal Unionist	Ind. Labour Party
Alliance	Conservative-Liberal Unionist
Leader since	1886	1893
Leader's seat	House of Lords	West Ham South (lost seat)
Last election	32 seats, 8.9%	Did not contest
Seats won	52	0
Seat change	▲20	Steady
Popular vote	236,725	40,056
Percentage	8.1%	1.1%
Swing	▼0.8 pp	New party

From 13 July to 7 August 1895, the 1895 United Kingdom general election was held in England, to elect all 670 members of the House of Commons, with 461 seats being in England. 456 seats represented territorial constituencies contested under the first past the post electoral system, and several multi-member constituencies under the block voting system; and 5 additional seats represented the 3 university constituencies which returned members under different voting systems.

William Gladstone had retired as prime minister in the previous year, and Queen Victoria, disregarding Gladstone's advice to name Lord Spencer as his successor, had appointed the Earl of Rosebery as the new prime minister. Rosebery's government found itself largely in a state of paralysis due to a power struggle between him and William Harcourt, the Liberal Party leader in the Commons.

On 21 June, Parliament voted to dismiss Secretary of State for War Henry Campbell-Bannerman following the 1895 vote of no confidence in the Rosebery ministry over Rosebery following the move to reduce the salary of the Secretary of State for War as a censure over deficient supply of cordite to the Army. Fearing the government would likely not survive a potential motion of no confidence, Rosebery resigned as Prime Minister. Leader of the Conservative Party Lord Salisbury was re-appointed as prime minister, and called a new election.

The Conservative Party and Liberal Unionist Party once again ran under their national alliance, leading to a landslide victory for the parties over the Liberal Party nationally.

== Candidates ==
Below is a table summarising the candidates of the 1895 general election in England, excluding those in the university constituencies.

Affiliation	Candidates
Conservative Party	373
Liberal Party	342 (Note: Includes 13 Liberal-Labour candidates.)
Liberal Unionist Party	69
Independent Labour Party	21
Social Democratic Federation	4 (Note: The candidates that stood were Leader Henry Hyndman in Burnley, Frederick George Jones in Northampton, H. W. Hobart in Salford South and George Lansbury in Walworth.)
Independent Liberal	3 (Note: The candidates that stood were Nelson P. Palmer in Camberwell North, William Wightman in Kennington and J. M. Robertson in Northampton.)
Nationalist Party	1 (Note: Candidate T. P. O'Connor stood in Liverpool Scotland.)
Independent Labour	1 (Note: Candidate Alton William Hillen stood in Cheltenham.)
Independent	1 (Note: Candidate John Leighton stood in St Pancras North.)
Total	815

== Analysis ==
=== Liberal Party ===
The Liberal Party saw a drastic fall in seats across England, with the party losing several seats to the Conservative Party and Liberal Unionists. It maintained 46.7% of the vote share, with a minor drop of 1.3% when compared to the previous election. The party lost 92 seats. However it gained Penryn and Falmouth, Colchester, Prestwich, Stockton-on-Tees, Hexham, Scarborough and Pontefract from the Conservatives. It also gained Nottingham West and Lichfield from the Liberal Unionists. It also gained one of the two seats in two-seated constituencies of Plymouth, Ipswich and Bolton from the Conservatives, with the Conservative Party holding the others.

From others, it gained Battersea from being an Independent Labour seat, with incumbent John Burns retaining it personally, but having joined the Liberal-Labour faction of the Liberal Party, won it for the Liberal Party. Similarly, in Middlesbrough, Havelock Wilson, who was an Independent Labour MP, joined the Liberal-Labour factions under the Liberal sponsorship. His retention was also a gain for the Liberals.

Amongst the Liberal-Labour candidates, they held North West Norfolk, Mid Durham, Morpeth, Wansbeck, Normanton. There was a gain in Leicester with a Liberal-Labour dual candidate, following a by-election in 1904 after both Liberals in the two-member seat resigned from Parliament. Liberal-Labour candidate Henry Broadhurst took one of the two seats in the two-seat by-election, and retained its for the faction at this election as a sitting MP. But the faction also lost Bethnal Green North East, Finsbury East, Haggerston in the County of London, as well as Ince to the Conservative Party. It also lost Shipley to the Liberal Unionists.

Overall, the party gained 14 seats in England, but lost 92 to the Conservatives and Liberal Unionists, with an overall loss of 78 seats. It took 112 seats in total, within which 8 were Liberal-Labour MPs.

=== Conservative Party ===
The Conservative Party saw a slight increase in vote share of around 1.6%, but with a significant increase in seats across England. The party lost only 12 seats, two of which were uncontested exchanges with its ally, the Liberal Unionist Party. Its other losses were to the Liberal party. It otherwise gained 73 seats, primarily from the Liberal Party, but also including two from the Liberal Unionists.

The party retained it 4 seats in the English university constituencies, and an overall 292 seats in the county and borough constituencies, to a total seat count of 296 seats. When combined with the results of the Liberal Unionist Party, they held a combined 343 county and borough seats, as well as all 5 university constituency seats. And, when combined with the results across the United Kingdom, the Conservative Party and its allies the Liberal Unionist Party took a landslide victory over the Liberal Party nationally, forming government once again and Lord Salisbury returning as Prime Minister.

=== Liberal Unionist Party ===
The Liberal Unionist Party, led by the Duke of Devonshire (and Joseph Chamberlain in the House of Commons), saw a slight 0.8% decrease in vote to 8.1% of the vote, but with a gain of 20 seats.The party retained Bodmin, St Ives, Truro, Totnes, East Somerset, Aylesbury, St Pancras South, South Norfolk, Sudbury, Ludlow, Wellington (Shropshire), Handsworth, West Staffordshire, Wolverhampton South, Ross, Droitwich, East Worcestershire, Warwick and Leamington and West Derbyshire. It retained one of the two seats in Bath, as well as its university constituency seat in London University.

It also held its Birmingham provincial borough seats of Birmingham Bordesley, Birmingham Central, Birmingham Edgbaston, Birmingham North, Birmingham South and Birmingham West.

The party also won Camborne, Barnstaple, Bristol North, Gloucester, Cricklade, Lambeth North, Biggleswade, Stoke-upon-Trent, North Worcestershire, Lincoln, Spalding, Peterborough, Heywood, Liverpool Exchange, North Lonsdale, Manchester South, Darlington, South East Durham, The Hartlepools, Bradford Central, Shipley and Skipton from the Liberal Party. It also one of the two seats in Southampton also from the Liberals. Additionally, it won Marylebone West from the Conservative Party, with the Conservative incumbent MP retiring from Parliament and not standing a candidate against its ally. William Wentworth-Fitzwilliam also entered Parliament in Wakefield. This was a win from the Conservatives, where the Conservatives again did not stand a candidate.

However, lost Westminster St George's, Hannover Square to the Conservative Party due to incumbent George Goschen joining the Conservative Party and standing as its candidate at this election. It also lost Bury and Hythe to the Conservatives, with the Liberal Unionist incumbent MPs retiring, and the party not standing against the Conservatives. Outside the alliance with the Conservatives, it lost Nottingham West and Lichfield to the Liberal Party.

Overall, the Liberal Unionists lost 5 seats but gained 25, an increase of 20 seats at 52 seats total (51 being county and borough MPs, with 1 in the university constituency of London University) compared to the last election.

=== Independent Labour Party ===
The newly-formed Independent Labour Party under its leader Keir Hardie stood for the first time at this election, with the party standing candidates in 21 candidates in England and 7 in Scotland. However, the party saw no success, with it not gaining any seats in England or Scotland. Additionally, Hardie himself lost his seat of West Ham South to the Conservative Party, although the gain was technically from Hardie as an Independent Labour MP from the previous election.

The ILP would stand in subsequent elections in smaller numbers, but would not gain seats at any until the 1931 general election, although in support of the future Labour Party.

Hardie would go on to return to Parliament in the 1900 United Kingdom general election in Wales, as part of the Labour Representation Committee which he would found following this election.

== Seats summary ==
Below is a table summarising the total number of seats, gains and losses for each party in both the territorial county and borough constituencies and the university constituencies.

Party	Seats				
Party	Total	Gains	Losses	Net	Of all (%)
Conservative-Liberal Unionist	348	98	17	▲81	75.5
Conservative	296	73	12	▲61	64.2
Liberal Unionist	52	25	5	▲20	11.3
Liberal	112 (Note: Includes 8 Liberal-Labour MPs.)	14	92	▼78	24.3
Irish Nationalist	1	0	0	Steady	0.2
Independent Labour	0	0	3	▼3	—
Total	461				

== County and borough results ==
Below is a table summarising the constituency results of the 1895 general election in England, excluding the result in the university constituencies.

Party	Seats					Aggregate votes		
Party	Total	Gains	Losses	Net	Of total (%)	Total	Of total (%) (Note: Adjusted for multi-member constituencies.)	Change (%)
Conservative-Liberal Unionist	343	98	17	▲81	75.2	1,521,938	51.9	▲0.8
Conservative	292	73	12	▲61	64.0	1,285,213	43.8	▲1.6
Liberal Unionist	51	25	5	▲20	11.2	236,725	8.1	▼0.8
Liberal	112 (Note: Includes 8 Liberal-Labour MPs.)	14	92	▼78	24.6	1,369,598	46.7	▼1.3
Ind. Labour Party	0	New			—	40,056	1.1	New
Social Democratic Federation	0	0	0	Steady	—	3,730	0.1	▲0.1
Irish Nationalist	1 (Note: T. P. O'Connor in Liverpool Scotland.)	0	0	Steady	0.2	2,089	0.1	Steady
Independent Liberal	0	0	0	Steady	—	1,893	0.1	▲0.1
Independent	0	0	0	Steady	—	29	0.0	Steady
Independent Labour	0	0	3	▼3	—	23	0.0	▼0.6
Total	456			0	100.0	2,939,356	100.0	0.0
Registered voters, and turnout						3,424,695 (Note: Electorate in contested constituencies. The total electorate was 4,620,320.)	79.2	▲0.5

=== Popular vote ===
Popular vote
Liberal	46.7%
Conservative	43.8%
Liberal Unionist	8.1%
Ind. Labour Party	1.1%
Irish Nationalist	0.1%
Others	0.2%

Popular vote (alliances)
Con-LU	51.9%
Liberal	46.7%
Ind. Labour Party	1.1%
Irish Nationalist	0.1%
Others	0.2%

=== Parliament seats ===
Parliament seats
Conservative	64.0%
Liberal	24.6%
Liberal Unionist	11.2%
Irish Nationalist	0.2%

Parliament seats (alliances)
Con-LU	75.2%
Liberal	24.6%
Irish Nationalist	0.2%

== University constituency results ==
=== University results summary ===
Below is a table summarising the seats and vote share of the English university constituencies in the 1895 general election.

Party	Seats				Aggregate votes	
Party	Total	Gains	Losses	Net	Total	Of all (%)
Conservative-Liberal Unionist	5	0	0	Steady	0	0.0
Conservative	4	0	0	Steady	0	0.0
Liberal Unionist	1	0	0	Steady	0	0.0
Total	5				0	

=== Cambridge University ===
The constituency for Cambridge University returned two Members of Parliament using the Plurality block voting electoral system. The electorate consisted of graduates of the university.

General election 1895: Cambridge University (2 seats)
Party	Candidate	Votes	%	±%
Conservative	Sir John Eldon Gorst	Unopposed		
Conservative	Richard Claverhouse Jebb	Unopposed		
Conservative hold				
Conservative hold				

=== London University ===
The constituency for London University returned one Member of Parliament using the First-past-the-post electoral system. The electorate consisted of graduates of the university.

General election 1895: London University
Party	Candidate	Votes	%	±%
Liberal Unionist	John Lubbock	Unopposed		
Liberal Unionist hold				

=== Oxford University ===
The constituency for Oxford University returned two Members of Parliament using the Plurality block voting electoral system. The electorate consisted of graduates of the university.

General election 13 July 1895: Oxford University (2 seats)
Party	Candidate	Votes	%	±%
Conservative	John Mowbray	Unopposed		
Conservative	John Gilbert Talbot	Unopposed		
Conservative hold				
Conservative hold				

== See also ==
- 1895 United Kingdom general election in Ireland
- 1895 United Kingdom general election in Scotland
- 1895 United Kingdom general election in Wales
- List of United Kingdom Parliament constituencies (1885–1918) by region
