= 1895 United Kingdom general election in Ireland =

- 12–29 July 1895

103 seats for Ireland of the 670 seats in the House of Commons
- Turnout: 72.7% (▲5.0 pp)
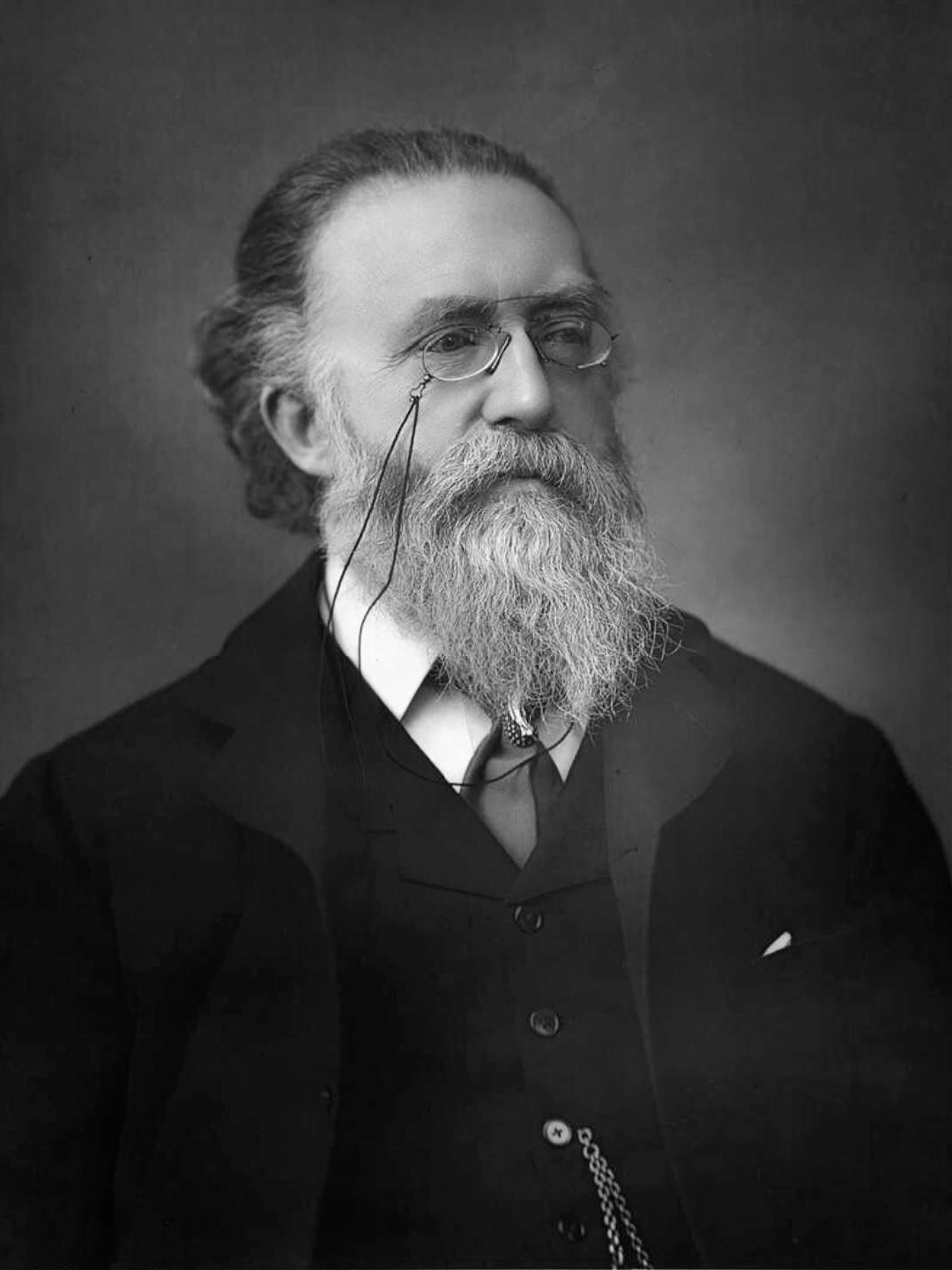

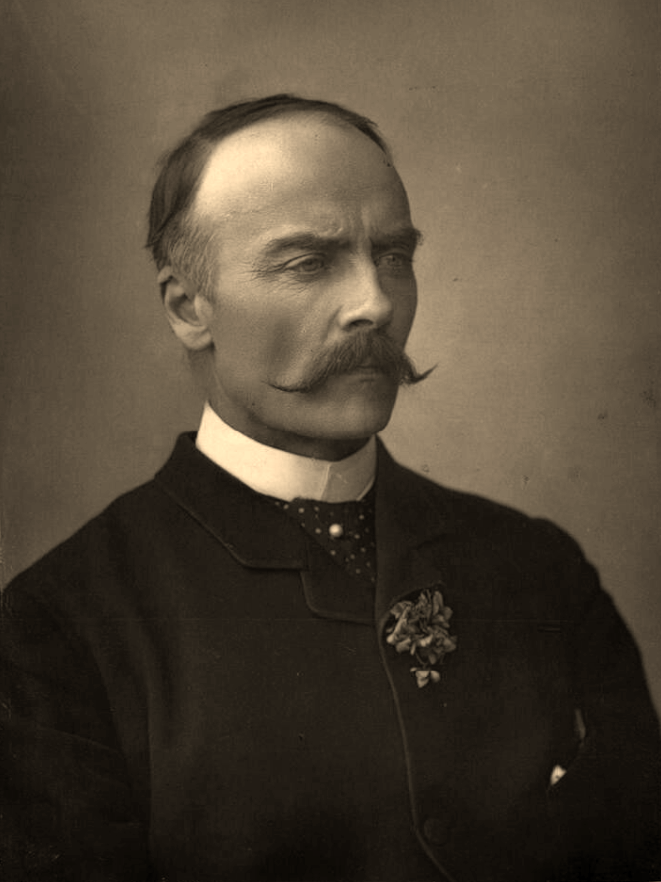

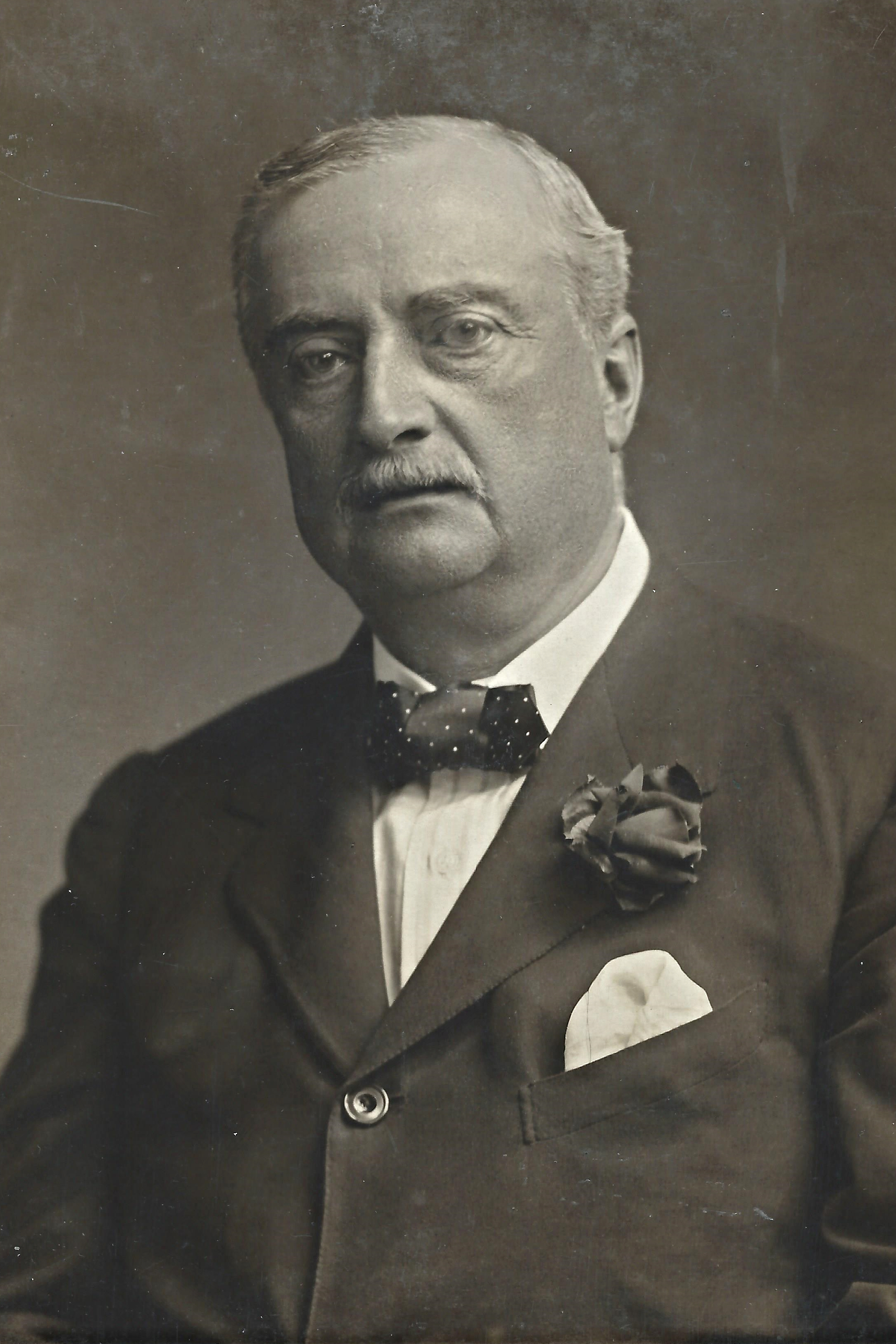

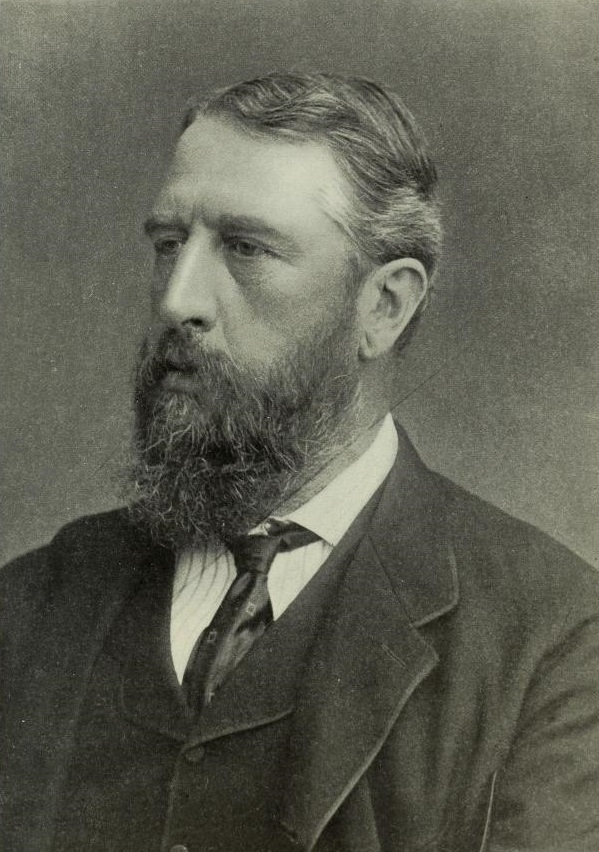

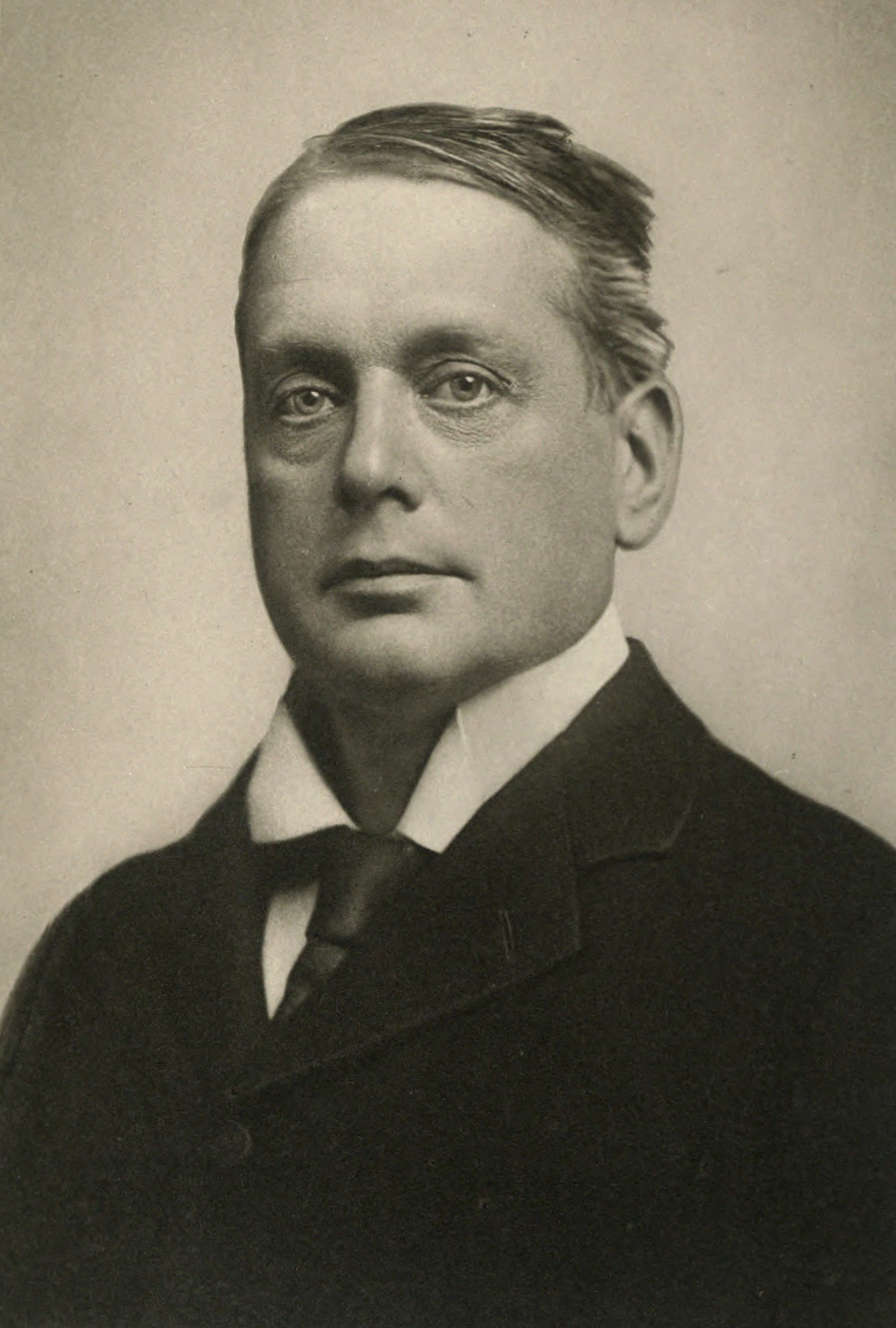
| | First party | Second party | Third party |
|---|---|---|---|
| Leader | Justin McCarthy | Edward James Saunderson | John Redmond |
| Party | Irish National Federation | Irish Unionist | Irish National League |
| Alliance | | Conservative-Liberal Unionist |
| Leader since | 1892 | 1891 | October 1891 |
| Leader's seat | North Longford | North Armagh | Waterford City |
| Last election | 71 seats, 59.6% | 18 seats, 13.4% | 9 seats, 17.9% |
| Seats won | 69 | 17 | 12 |
| Seat change | ▼2 | ▼1 | ▲3 |
| Popular vote | 95,715 | 36,193 | 52,678 |
| Percentage | 43.4% | 16.7% | 23.9% |
| Swing | ▼16.2 pp | ▲3.3 pp | ▲6.0 pp |
| | Fourth party | Fifth party |
| Leader | Duke of Devonshire | Earl of Rosebery |
| Party | Liberal Unionist | Liberal |
| Alliance | Conservative-Liberal Unionist |
| Leader since | 1886 | 5 March 1894 |
| Leader's seat | House of Lords | House of Lords |
| Last election | 5 seats, 7.2% | 0 seats, 3.7% |
| Seats won | 4 | 1 |
| Seat change | ▼1 | ▲1 |
| Popular vote | 20,530 | 9,554 |
| Percentage | 9.3% | 4.3% |
| Swing | ▲2.1 pp | ▲0.6 pp |

From 13 July to 7 August 1895, the 1895 United Kingdom general election was held in Ireland. Of the 670 seats in the House of Commons, 103 were in Ireland; 101 represented 100 county and borough territorial constituencies, with 2 seats representing Cork City; and two additional seats represented the Dublin University wherein only graduates of the university could vote.

William Gladstone had retired as prime minister in the previous year, and Queen Victoria, disregarding Gladstone's advice to name Lord Spencer as his successor, had appointed the Earl of Rosebery as the new prime minister. Rosebery's government found itself largely in a state of paralysis due to a power struggle between him and William Harcourt, the Liberal Party leader in the Commons.

On 21 June, Parliament voted to dismiss Secretary of State for War Henry Campbell-Bannerman following the 1895 vote of no confidence in the Rosebery ministry over Rosebery following the move to reduce the salary of the Secretary of State for War as a censure over deficient supply of cordite to the Army. Fearing the government would likely not survive a potential motion of no confidence, Rosebery resigned as Prime Minister. Leader of the Conservative Party Lord Salisbury was re-appointed as prime minister, and called a new election.

The Conservative Party and Liberal Unionist Party once again ran under their national alliance, leading to a landslide victory for the parties over the Liberal Party nationally.

== Candidates ==
Below is a table summarising the candidates of the 1895 general election in Ireland, excluding those who stood in the University constituency of Dublin University.

| Affiliation | Candidates |
|---|---|
| Irish National Federation | 76 |
| Irish Unionist Party | 31 |
| Irish National League | 26 |
| Liberal Unionist Party | 8 (Note: The candidates stood in Belfast West, Dublin St Stephen's Green, East Donegal, Mid Tyrone, North Wexford, South Down, South Londonderry, South Tyrone.) |
| Liberal Party | 3 (Note: The candidates that stood were Arthur Houston in North Londonderry, William Huston Dodd in South Londonderry and Charles Hemphill in North Tyrone.) |
| Independent Nationalist | 2 (Note: The candidates that stood were William Archibald Macdonald in Ossory and Thomas Shillington in South Tyrone.) |
| Independent Liberal | 1 (Note: Candidate George Reginald Leeper stood in North Fermanagh.) |
| Total | 147 |

== Analysis ==
The divide between the anti-Parnellite Irish National Federation and the pro-Parnellite Irish National League continued, and with only minor variation in seats. In the overall election result, the Conservative–Liberal Unionist coalition beat the Liberal Party government led by the Earl of Rosebery. Lord Salisbury returned as Prime Minister of the United Kingdom, having previously served from 1885 to 1886, and again from 1886 to 1892.

The Unionist Party and Liberal Unionists, both under the alliance of the Conservatives and Liberal Unionists nationally, held a combined 21 seats; the Conservatives held 17 while the Liberal Unionists held 4. There was one seat exchange between the parties in Dublin University wherein Edward Carson was instead elected a Unionist rather than a Liberal Unionist.

The Liberal Party under its new leader, the Earl of Rosebery, regained representation in Ireland since its collapse in the 1885 general election. The party finally regained North Tyrone wherein candidate Charles Hemphill won the seat from the Unionists.

The Irish National League and Irish National Federation, still split between two parties, maintained a steady lead in terms of seats, with the League gaining 3 further seats. However, although the Federation lost seats overall, it won seats as well. The Federation did lose North Roscommon, South Meath, Kilkenny City and Limerick City and East Wicklow to the League. But the Federation gained North Galway from the League. the Federation also won Londonderry City from the Unionists.

== County and borough results ==
| Party | Leader | Seats | | | | | Aggregate votes | | |
| Party | Leader | Total | Gains | Losses | Net | Of total (%) | Total | Of total (%) (Note: Adjusted for multi-member constituencies.) | Change (%) |
|---|---|---|---|---|---|---|---|---|---|
| Irish National Federation | Justin; McCarthy | 69 | 3 | 5 | ▼2 | 68.3 | 95,715 | 43.0 | ▼16.2 |
| Irish National League | John; Redmond | 12 | 2 | 5 | ▲3 | 11.9 | 52,678 | 23.9 | ▲6.0 |
| Irish Unionist | Edward James; Saunderson | 15 | 0 | 2 | ▼2 | 14.9 | 36,193 | 16.7 | ▲3.3 |
| Liberal Unionist | Duke of Devonshire | 4 | 0 | 0 | Steady | 3.9 | 20,530 | 9.3 | ▲2.1 |
| Liberal | Earl of Rosebery | 1 | 1 | 0 | ▲1 | 1.0 | 9,554 | 4.3 | ▲0.6 |
| Independent; Nationalist | —N/a | 0 | 0 | 0 | Steady | — | 3,429 | 1.6 | ▲1.0 |
| Independent; Liberal | —N/a | 0 | New | | | — | 2,406 | 1.1 | New |
| Total | | 101 | | | 0 | 100.0 | 220,505 | 100.0 | 0.0 |
| Registered voters, and turnout | | | | | | | 289,239 (Note: Electorate in contested constituencies. The total electorate was 732,046.) | 72.7 | ▲5.0 |

=== Popular vote ===
Popular vote
| Nat. Federation | 43.0% |
| Nat. League | 23.9% |
| Irish Unionist | 16.7% |
| Liberal Unionist | 9.3% |
| Liberal | 4.3% |
| Others | 2.7% |

Popular vote (alliances)
| Nat. Federation | 43.0% |
| Con-LU | 26.0% |
| Nat. League | 23.9% |
| Liberal | 4.3% |
| Others | 2.7% |

=== Parliament seats ===
Parliamentary seats
| Nat. Federation | 68.3% |
| Irish Unionist | 14.9% |
| Nat. League | 11.9% |
| Liberal Unionist | 3.9% |

Parliamentary seats (alliances)
| Nat. Federation | 68.3% |
| Con-LU | 18.8% |
| Nat. League | 11.9% |

== Dublin University constituency result ==
1895 general election: Dublin University (2 seats)
| Party | Candidate | Votes | % | ±% |
|---|---|---|---|---|
| Irish Unionist | David Plunket | Unopposed | | |
| Irish Unionist | Edward Carson | Unopposed | | |
| Registered electors | | 4,506 | | |
| Irish Unionist hold | | | | |
| Irish Unionist gain from Liberal Unionist | | | | |

== See also ==
- 1895 United Kingdom general election in England
- 1895 United Kingdom general election in Scotland
- 1895 United Kingdom general election in Wales
- List of United Kingdom Parliament constituencies (1885–1918) by region
- History of Ireland (1801–1923)
