= List of MPs for constituencies in Wales (1895–1900) =

- 1895
- 1895 general election in England and Wales; Colours on map indicate the party allegiance of each constituency's MP.

This is a list of Members of Parliament elected to the Parliament of the United Kingdom from Wales between the 1895 United Kingdom general election and the 1900 United Kingdom general election.

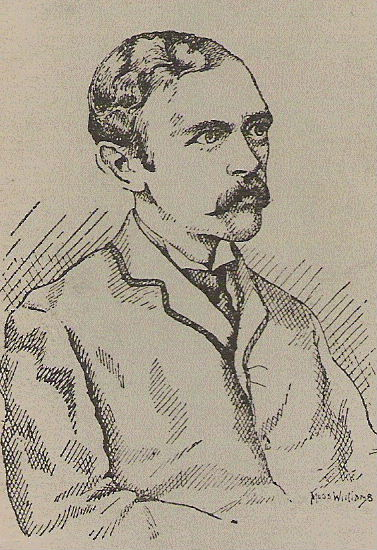
Thomas Edward Ellis AS

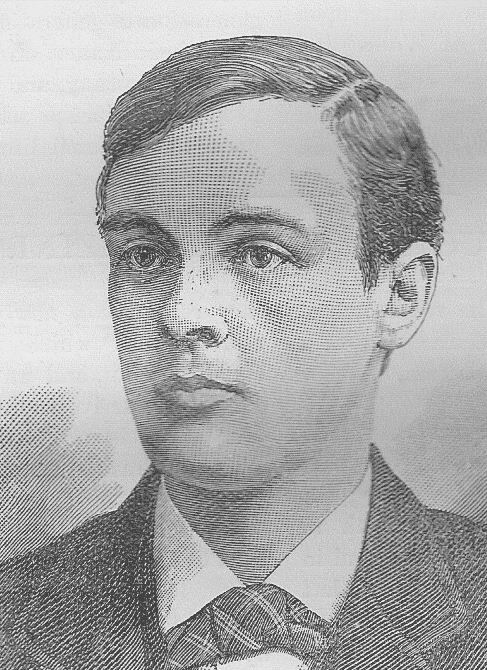
Owen Morgan Edwards AS

== List ==
- William Abraham
- William Rees Morgan Davies (until 1898)
- Owen Morgan Edwards (from 1899)
- Thomas Edward Ellis (until 1899)
- Ellis Jones Ellis-Griffith
- Samuel Thomas Evans
- David Lloyd George
- William Vernon Harcourt
- William Tudor Howell
- John Jones Jenkins
- David Brynmor Jones
- William Jones
- Arthur Humphreys-Owen
- John Wimburn Laurie
- John Herbert Lewis
- John Talbot Dillwyn Llewellyn
- Powlett Milbank
- Reginald McKenna
- James Mackenzie Maclean
- Frederick Courtenay Morgan
- George Osborne Morgan (until 1897)
- John Lloyd Morgan
- William Pritchard Morgan
- Charles Morley
- Samuel Moss (from 1897)
- John Wynford Philipps
- Edward Pryce-Jones
- David Randell
- John Herbert Roberts
- John Bryn Roberts
- Samuel Smith
- Albert Spicer
- Alfred Thomas
- Abel Thomas
- David Alfred Thomas
- Matthew Vaughan-Davies
- Henry Wyndham-Quin
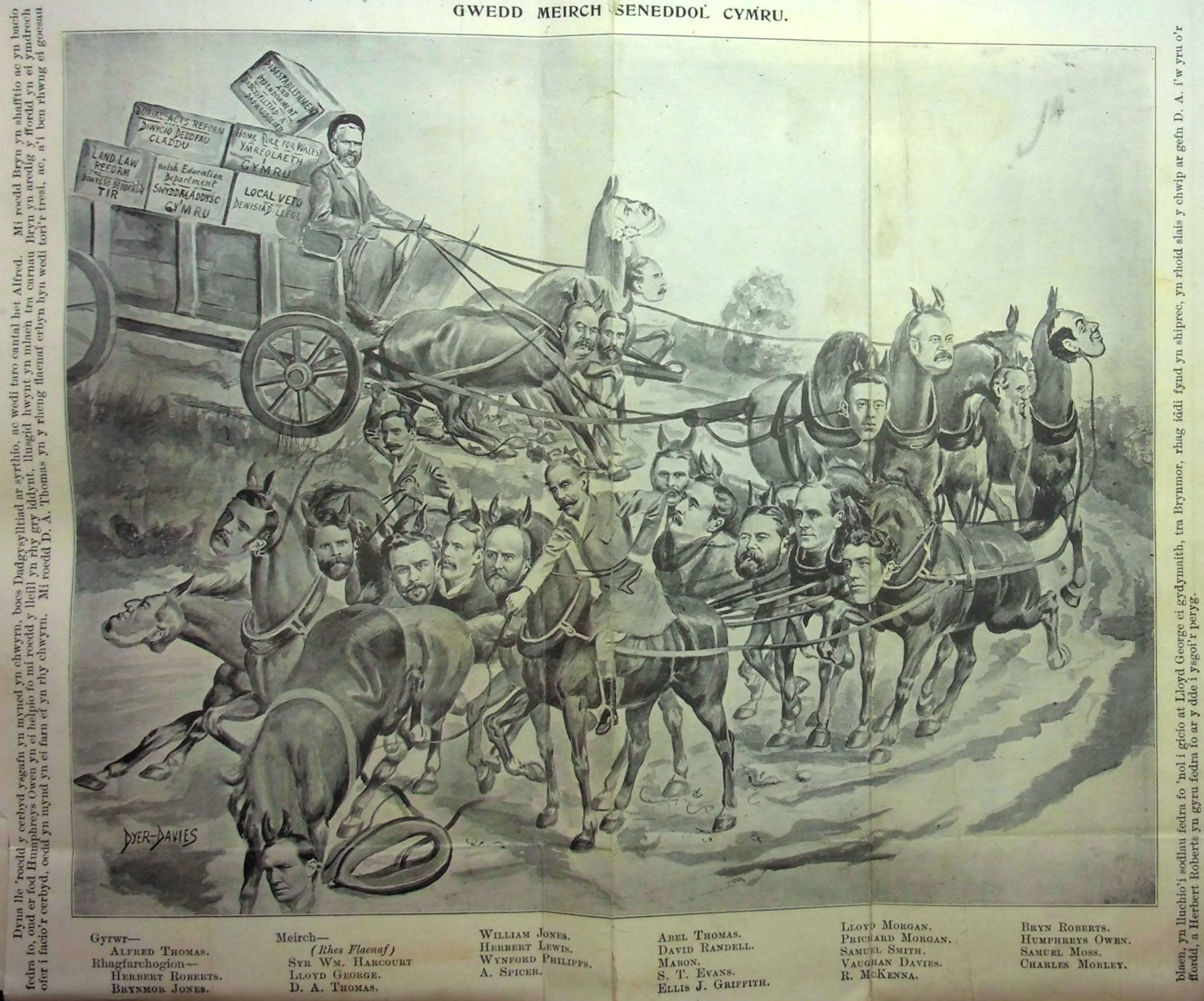
Liberal Members of Parliament for Wales in 1898 by Dafydd Dafis

== See also ==
- 1895 United Kingdom general election
- 1895 United Kingdom general election in Wales
