= 1895 United Kingdom general election in Wales =

- 13 Jul. – 7 Aug. 1895

All 34 Welsh seats to the House of Commons
- Turnout: 79.3% (▲3.7 pp)
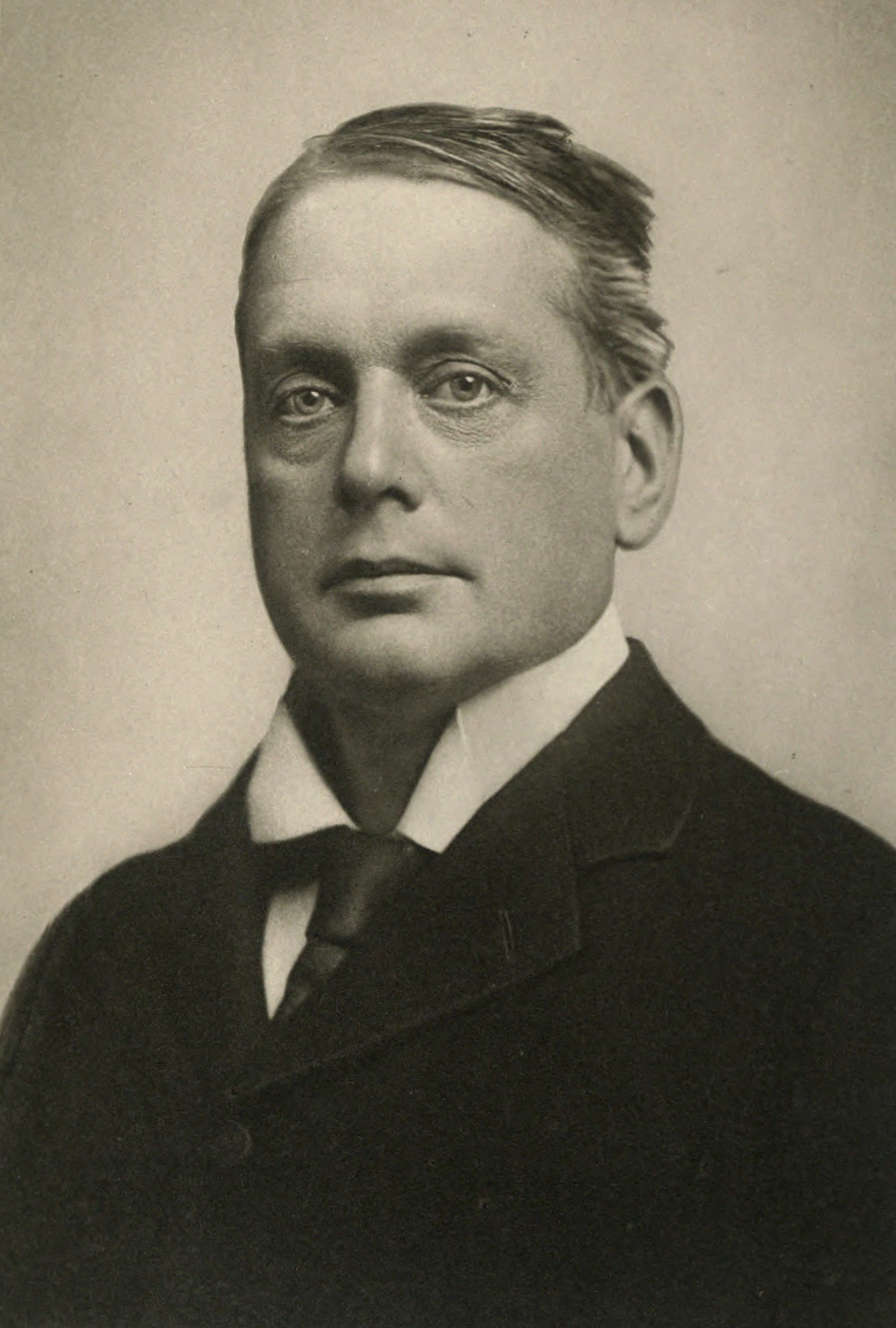

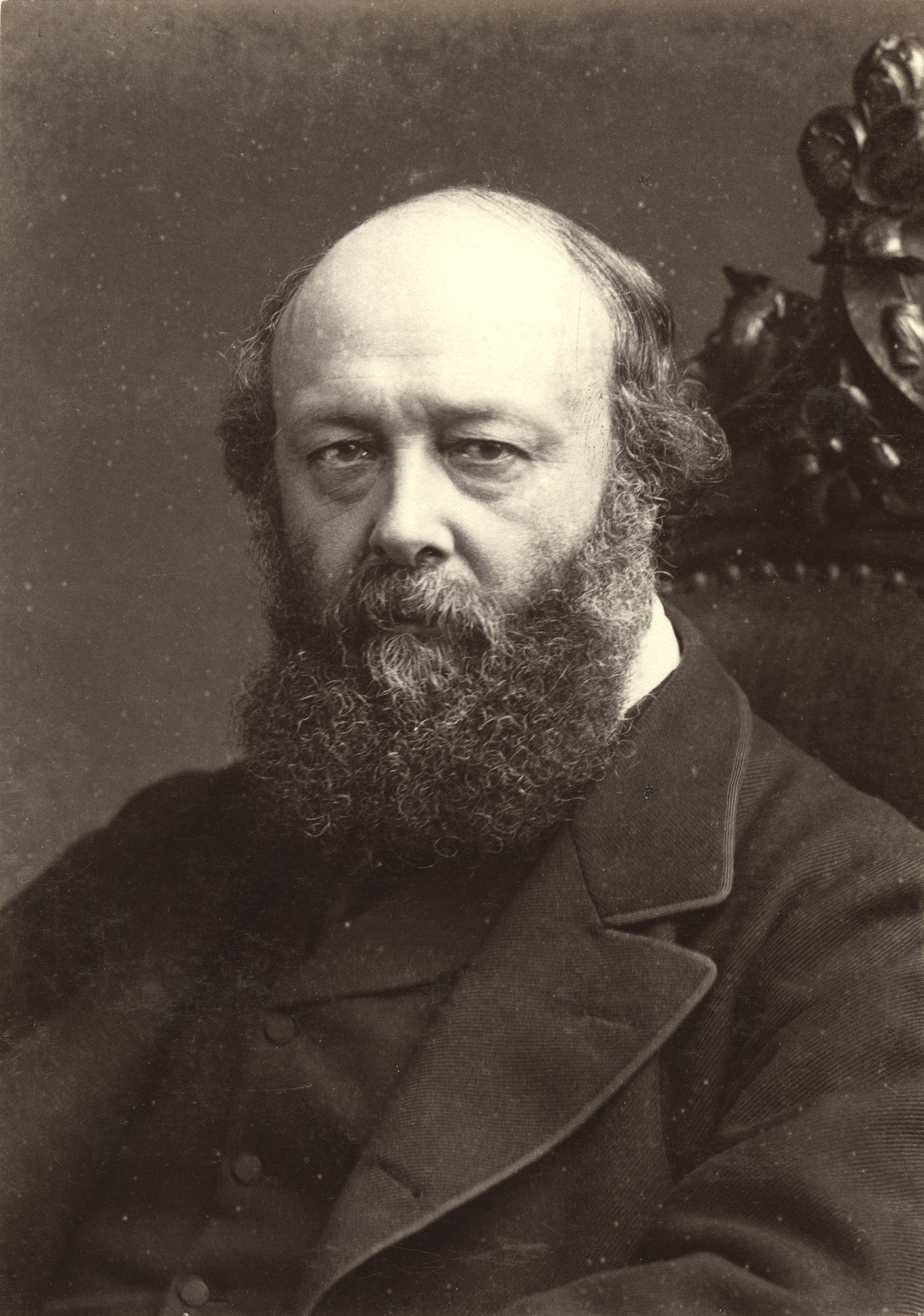

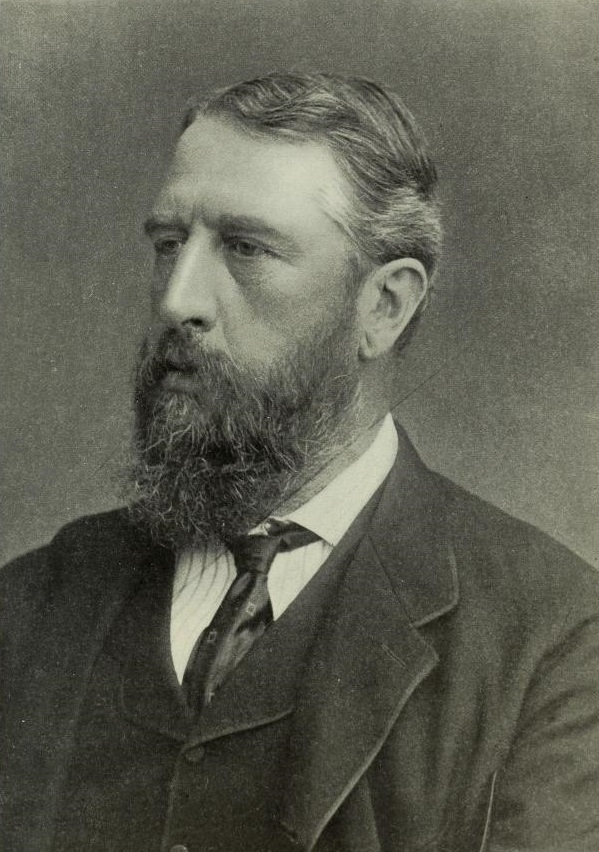
| | First party | Second party | Third party |
|---|---|---|---|
| Leader | Earl of Rosebery | Marquess of Salisbury | Duke of Devonshire |
| Party | Liberal | Conservative | Liberal Unionist |
| Alliance | | Conservative-Liberal Unionist | Conservative-Liberal Unionist |
| Leader since | 5 March 1894 | April 1881 | 1886 |
| Leader's seat | House of Lords | House of Lords | House of Lords |
| Last election | 31 seats, 62.8% | 3 seats, 27.5% | 0 seats, 9.7% |
| Seats won | 25 | 8 | 1 |
| Seat change | ▼6 | ▲5 | ▲1 |
| Popular vote | 144,216 | 98,256 | 5,546 |
| Percentage | 56.8% | 40.0% | 2.2% |
| Swing | ▼6.0 pp | ▲12.5 pp | ▼7.5 pp |

From 13 July to 7 August 1895, the 1895 United Kingdom general election was held in Wales, to elect all 670 members of the House of Commons, with 34 seats being in Wales. 34 seats represented territorial constituencies contested under the first past the post electoral system amongst 33 constituencies.

William Gladstone had retired as prime minister in the previous year, and Queen Victoria, disregarding Gladstone's advice to name Lord Spencer as his successor, had appointed the Earl of Rosebery as the new prime minister. Rosebery's government found itself largely in a state of paralysis due to a power struggle between him and William Harcourt, the Liberal Party leader in the Commons.

On 21 June, Parliament voted to dismiss Secretary of State for War Henry Campbell-Bannerman following the 1895 vote of no confidence in the Rosebery ministry over Rosebery following the move to reduce the salary of the Secretary of State for War as a censure over deficient supply of cordite to the Army. Fearing the government would likely not survive a potential motion of no confidence, Rosebery resigned as Prime Minister. Leader of the Conservative Party Lord Salisbury was re-appointed as prime minister, and called a new election.

The Conservative Party and Liberal Unionist Party once again ran under their national alliance, leading to a landslide victory for the parties over the Liberal Party nationally, with a more pronounced trend towards this alliance in Wales.

== Candidates ==
Below is a table summarising the candidates of the 1895 general election in Wales.

| Affiliation | Candidates |
|---|---|
| Liberal Party | 34 (Note: Includes Liberal-Labour candidate William Abraham who stood in Rhondda.) |
| Conservative Party | 29 |
| Liberal Unionist Party | 2 (Note: The candidates stood were John Jones Jenkins in Carmarthen Boroughs and William Joseph Buckley in West Carmarthenshire.) |
| Independent Liberal-Labour | 2 (Note: The candidates that stood were Allen Upward in Merthyr Tydfil and Ernest Hall Hedley in Swansea District.) |
| Total | 67 |

== Analysis ==
=== Liberal Party ===
Across the United Kingdom, the Liberal Party saw a 0.6% drop in vote share with a net loss of 94 seats, which were primarily transferred to the Conservative Party and its allies, the Liberal Unionist Party. However, this general trend was much more pronounced in vote share in Wales, with a transfer of seats away from the Liberals. In Wales, the Liberals saw a decrease in its seats from 31 seats to 25, as well as dropping in vote share by roughly 6.0%.

The Liberal Party retained the seats of Anglesey, Arfon, Eifion, East Denbighshire, Flint Boroughs, Flintshire, Merioneth, Montgomeryshire, Breconshire, Cardiganshire, Carmarthen Boroughs, East Carmarthenshire, West Carmarthenshire, West Denbighshire, Pembrokeshire, Caernarfon, East Glamorganshire, Rhondda, Mid Glamorganshire, Monmouth Boroughs, Swansea District, Gower, North Monmouthshire and West Monmouthshire. The party also held both seats in the two-member constituency of Merthyr Tydfil.

=== Conservatives and Liberal Unionists ===
Conservative Party saw a large swing in its favour against the Liberal Party much like it had nationally, as well as by standing more candidates in Wales compared to the previous elect with its allies, the Liberal Unionists, standing far fewer in Wales. Many of such seats instead had Conservative candidates. Overall, the alliance between the two parties saw an increase in vote share of a combined 5.0% and increase of 6 seats.

The Conservatives won Radnorshire, Pembroke and Haverfordwest, Cardiff, South Glamorganshire, Swansea Town from the Liberal Party. It otherwise retained Montgomery, Denbigh Boroughs and South Monmouthshire.

The Liberal Unionist Party suffered a large swing against it due largely to the party only having stood two candidates in Wales: John Jones Jenkins in Carmarthen Boroughs and William Joseph Buckley in West Carmarthenshire. Jenkins, who had run in Carmarthen Boroughs in the previous two elections unsuccessfully, won the constituency from the Liberal Party, returning to Parliament in the constituency after having lost his seat in 1886. Buckley was unsuccessful in West Carmarthenshire, but took 42.8% of the vote in the constituency. It was the last election at which the Liberal Unionists would hold elected political representation in Wales, before the party formally merged with the Conservative Party in 1912.

== Results ==
| Party | Seats | | | | | Aggregate votes | | |
| Party | Total | Gains | Losses | Net | Of total (%) | Total | Of total (%) (Note: Adjusted for multi-member constituencies.) | Change (%) |
|---|---|---|---|---|---|---|---|---|
| Liberal | 25 (Note: Includes Liberal-Labour MP William Abraham in Rhondda.) | 0 | 6 | ▼6 | 73.5 | 144,216 | 56.8 | ▼6.0 |
| Conservative-Liberal Unionist | 9 | 6 | 0 | ▲6 | 26.5 | 103,802 | 42.2 | ▲5.0 |
| Conservative | 8 | 5 | 0 | ▲5 | 23.5 | 98,256 | 40.0 | ▲12.5 |
| Liberal Unionist | 1 | 1 | 0 | ▲1 | 2.9 | 5,546 | 2.2 | ▼7.5 |
| Independent Liberal-Labour | 0 | Did not stand in 1892 | | | — | 2,677 | 1.0 | —N/a |
| Total | 34 | | | 0 | 100.0 | 250,695 | 100.0 | 0.0 |
| Registered voters, and turnout | | | | | | 303,488 (Note: Electorate in contested constituencies. The total electorate was 322,784.) | 79.3 | ▲3.7 |

=== Popular vote ===
Popular vote
| Liberal | 56.8% |
| Conservative | 40.0% |
| Liberal Unionist | 2.2% |
| Ind. Lib-Lab | 1.0% |

Popular vote (alliances)
| Liberal | 56.8% |
| Con-LU | 42.2% |
| Ind. Lib-Lab | 1.0% |

=== Parliament seats ===
Parliament seats
| Liberal | 73.5% |
| Conservative | 23.5% |
| Liberal Unionist | 2.9% |

Parliament seats (alliances)
| Liberal | 73.5% |
| Con-LU | 26.5% |

== See also ==
- 1895 United Kingdom general election in England
- 1895 United Kingdom general election in Ireland
- 1895 United Kingdom general election in Scotland
- List of United Kingdom Parliament constituencies (1885–1918) by region
- List of MPs for constituencies in Wales (1895–1900)
