= 1895 United Kingdom general election in Scotland =

- 13 July – 7 August 1895

All 72 Scottish seats to the House of Commons
- Turnout: 76.3% (▼2.0 pp)
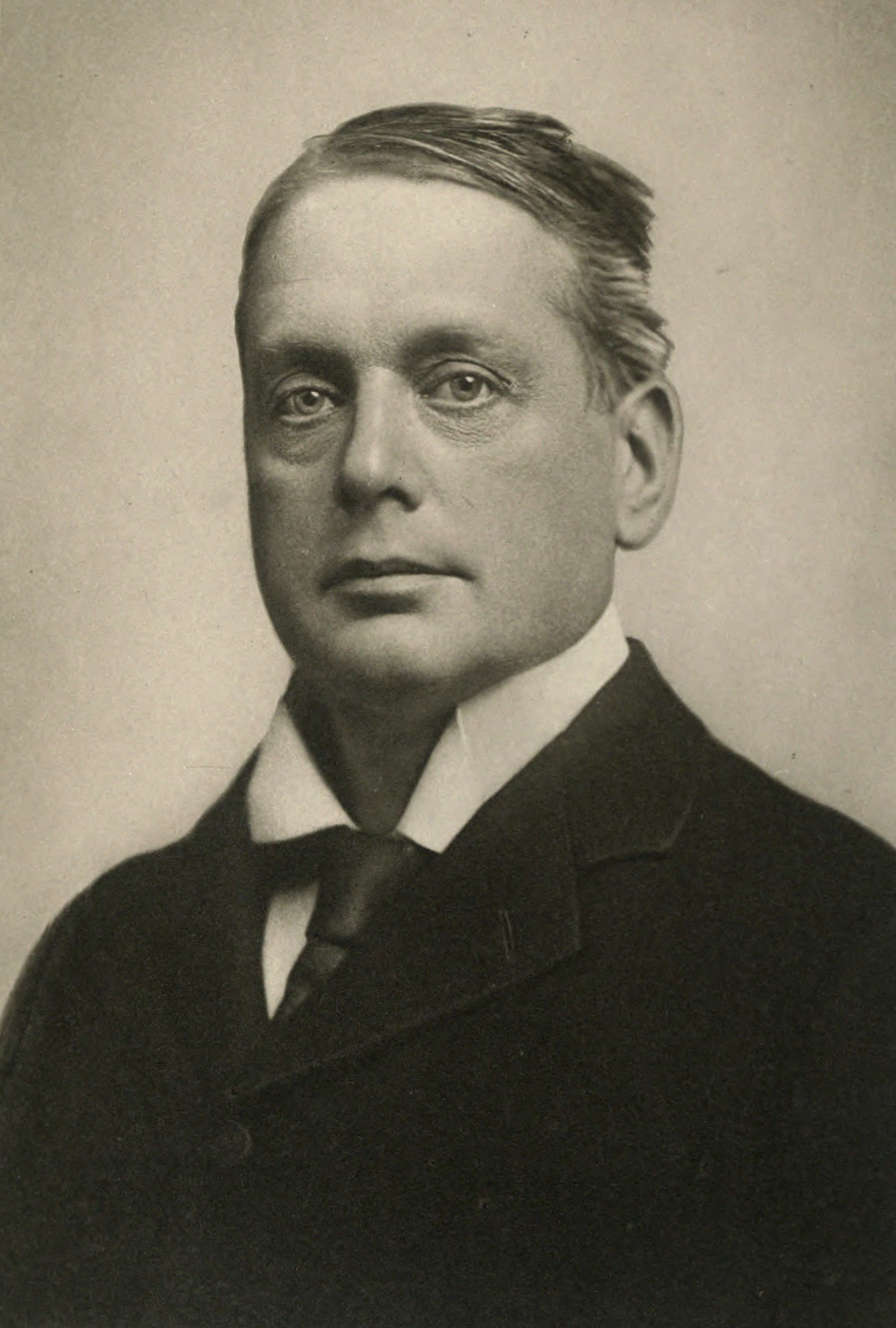

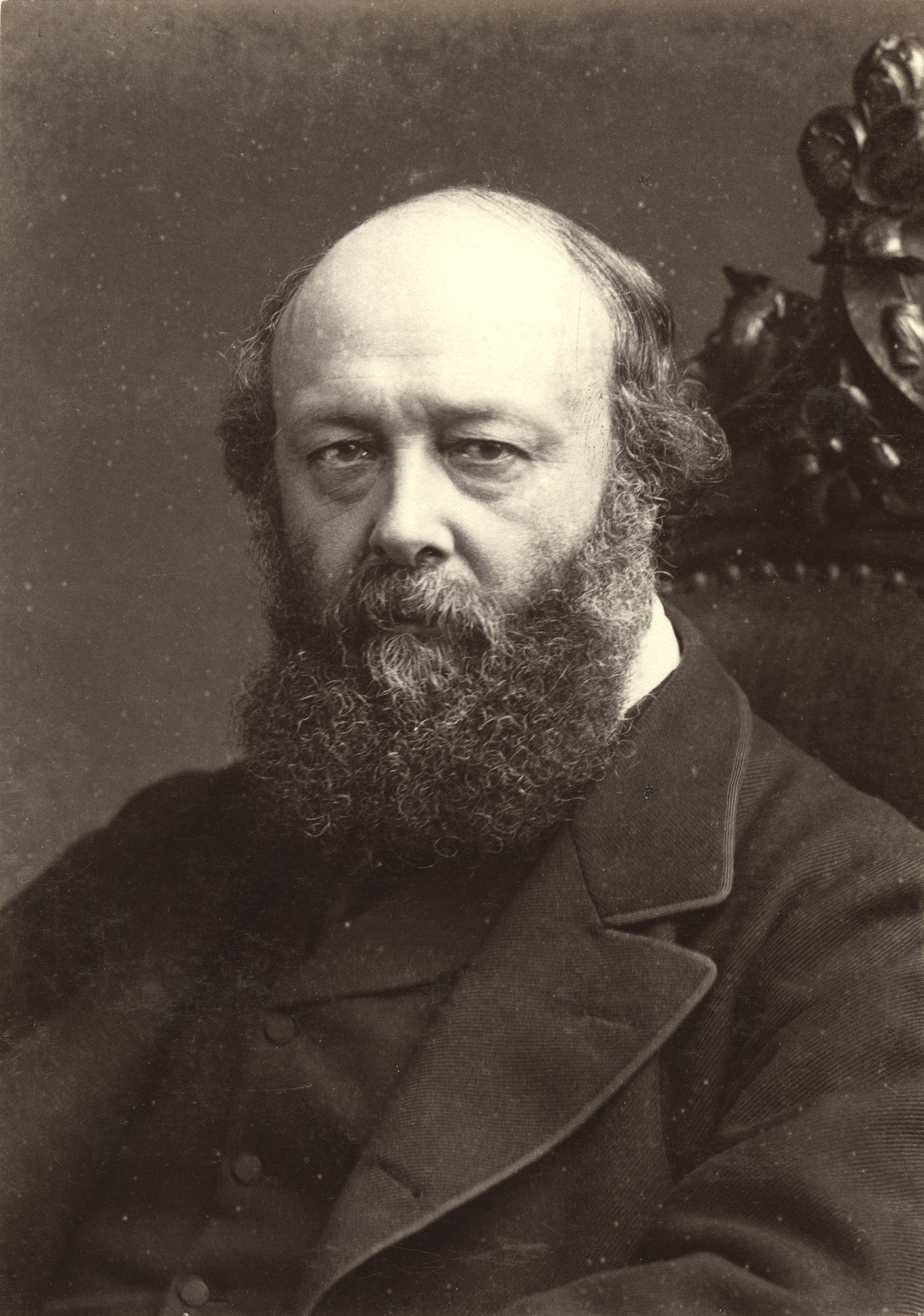

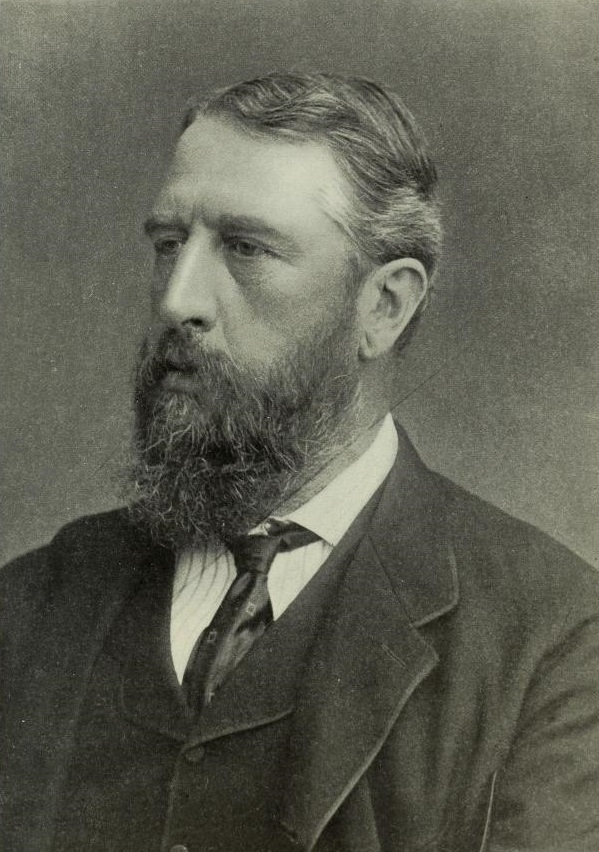

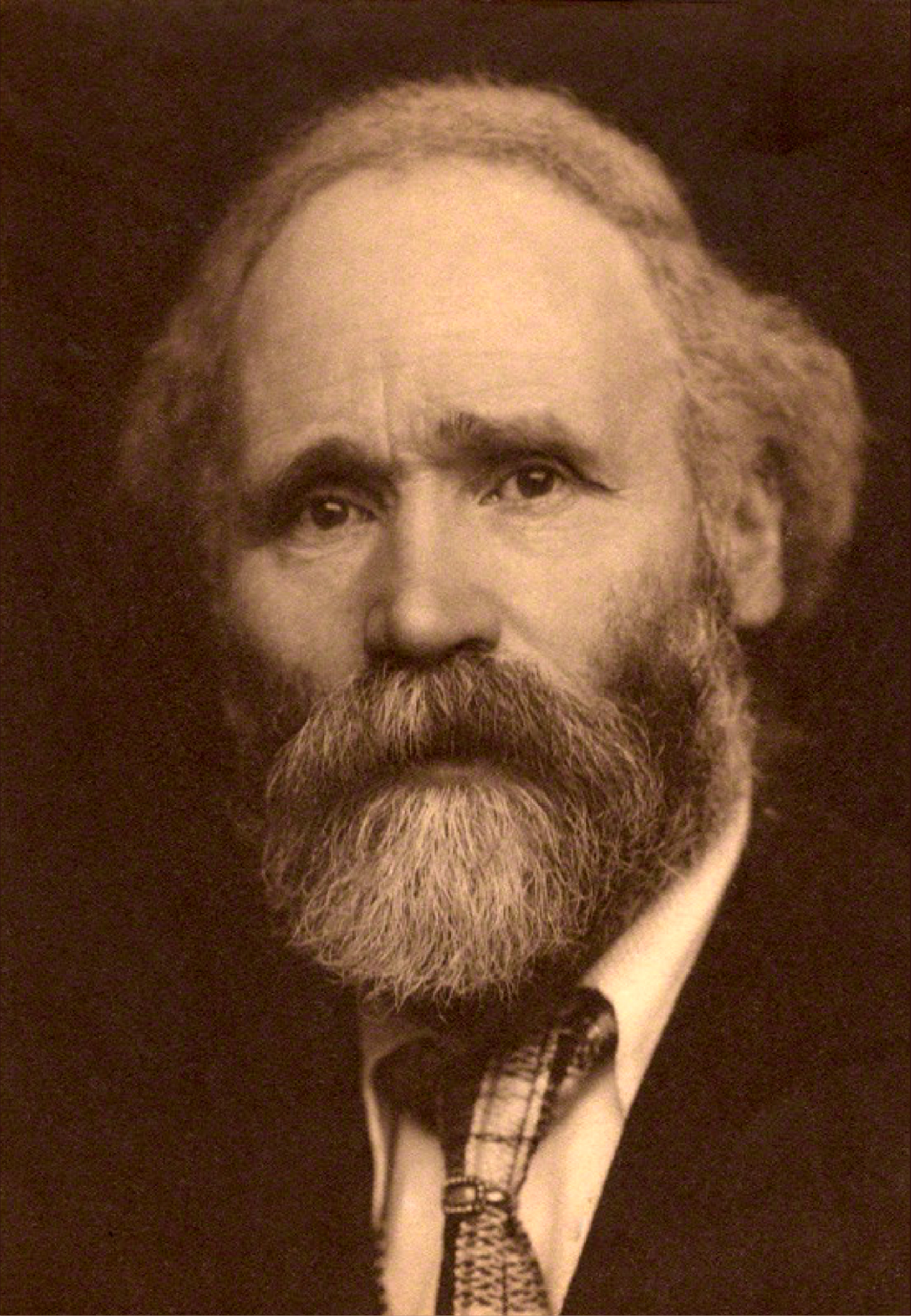
	First party	Second party
Leader	Earl of Rosebery	Marquess of Salisbury
Party	Liberal	Conservative
Alliance	Liberal	Conservative-Liberal Unionist
Leader since	5 March 1894	April 1881
Leader's seat	House of Lords	House of Lords
Last election	50 seats, (Note: Combined results for burgh, county and university seats) 53.9%	11 seats, 22.4%
Seats won	39	19
Seat change	▼11	▲8
Popular vote	236,446 (Note: Total and percentage votes given here are for territorial constituencies only)	118,532
Percentage	51.7%	26.8%
Swing	▼2.2 pp	▲4.4 pp
	Third party	Fourth party
Leader	Duke of Devonshire	Keir Hardie
Party	Liberal Unionist	Ind. Labour Party
Alliance	Conservative-Liberal Unionist
Leader since	1886	1893
Leader's seat	House of Lords	West Ham South (lost seat)
Last election	11 seats, 22.0%	Did not contest
Seats won	14	0
Seat change	▲3	Steady
Popular vote	95,871	4,269
Percentage	20.6%	0.8%
Swing	▼1.4 pp	New party
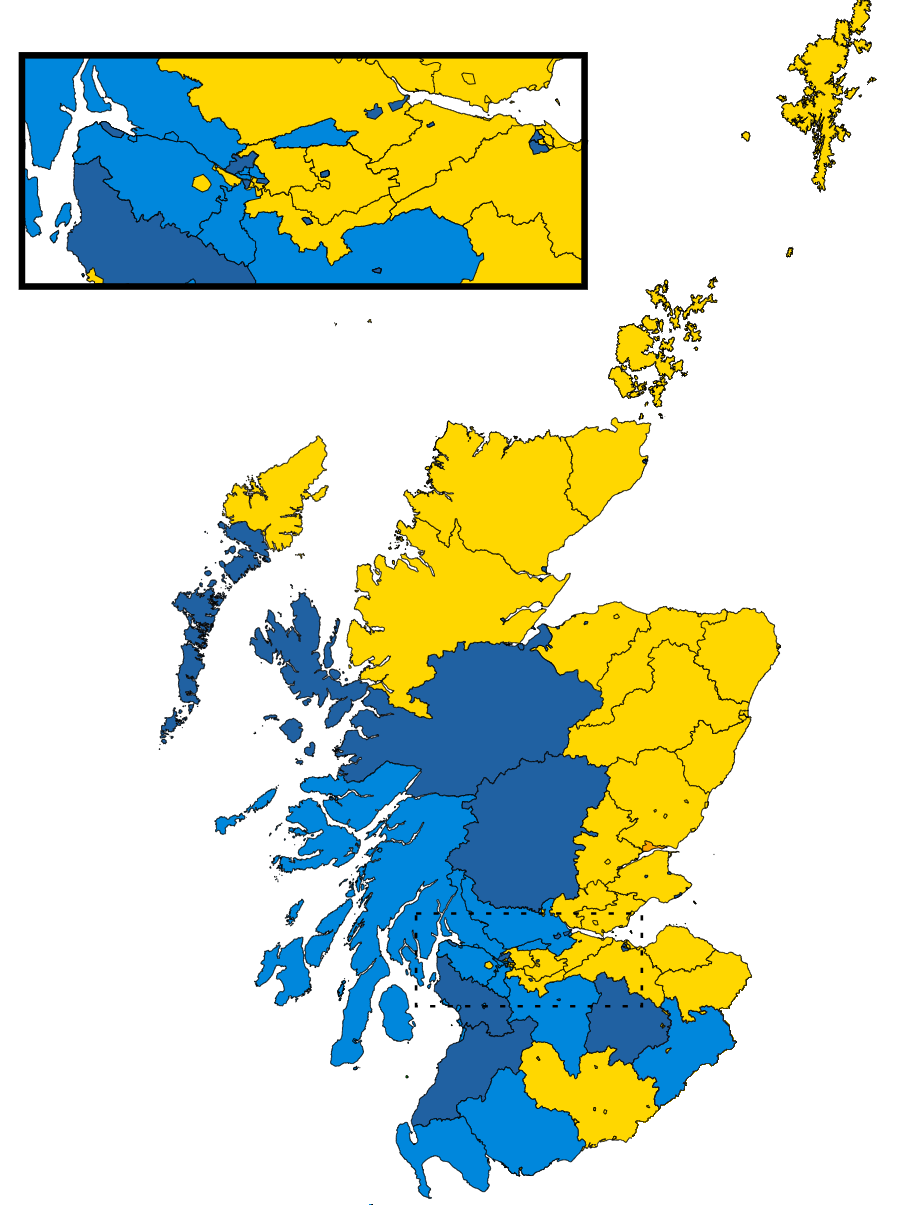
- Results of the 1892 election in Scotland for the county and burgh seats

The 1895 United Kingdom general election was held from 13 July to 7 August 1895, and members were returned for all Scottish seats. Scotland was allocated 72 seats in total, with 70 territorial seats, comprising 32 burgh constituencies and 37 county constituencies. (Note: One burgh seat, Dundee, was represented by two members of parliament.) There were also two university constituencies, Glasgow and Aberdeen Universities and Edinburgh and St Andrews Universities.

William Gladstone had led the Liberals to power three years earlier, however following his retirement in 1894 the Earl of Rosebery had been appointed as prime minister. Rosebery's government found itself largely in a state of paralysis due to a power struggle between him and William Harcourt, the Liberal leader in the Commons. The situation came to a head on 21 June 1895, when Parliament voted to dismiss Secretary of State for War Henry Campbell-Bannerman; Rosebery, realising that the government would likely not survive a motion of no confidence were one to be brought, promptly resigned as prime minister. Conservative leader Lord Salisbury was subsequently re-appointed for a third spell as prime minister, and promptly called a new election. Although the Liberals won a majority of the seats in Scotland, they suffered large losses, and when combined with results from across the United Kingdom the Conservatives/Liberal Unionist alliance achieved a parliamentary majority of 153 for Lord Salisbury.

The Independent Labour Party, having only previously existed as a loose grouping of left-wing politicians, formally organised into a party led by Keir Hardie in 1893 and contested their first election.

== Candidates ==
Below is a table summarising the candidates of the 1895 general election in Scotland, excluding those in the university constituencies.

Affiliation	Candidates
Scottish Liberal Party	66 (Note: Includes Liberal-Labour candidate Alfred Fletcher in Greenock.)
Conservative Party	37
Liberal Unionist Party	31
Independent Labour Party	7
Independent Labour	1 (Note: Candidate John Lincoln Mahon stood in Aberdeen North.)
Total	142

== Analysis ==
=== Liberal Party ===
The Liberal Party saw a very minor 2.2% drop in vote share, taking 51.7% of the votes in Scotland, but thereby maintaining its majority in votes. However, it saw a loss of 14 seats, primarily to the Conservative Party, and some to the Liberal Unionists. It did see 3 gains in exchanges with the latter parties as well. Overall, at 39 seats, it did maintain the majority of seats in Scotland.

A Liberal-Labour candidate, Alfred Fletcher, stood in Greenock for the Liberals under its sponsorship; however, Fletcher was unsuccessful.

=== Conservatives and Liberal Unionists ===
The Conservative Party, which was in an alliance with the Liberal Unionists in Parliament and at the constituency level, saw a rise in seats at the election. With the party standing 37 candidates, it took around 26.8% of the vote, an increase of 4.4% with a rise in seats by 8 seats, from 11 to 19. The party held the university constituency seats of Edinburgh and St Andrews Universities and Glasgow and Aberdeen Universities. It also held the county and borough seats of East Renfrewshire, West Renfrewshire, Buteshire, Glasgow Central, South Lanarkshire, Kirkcudbright Stewartry and Wigtownshire.

It saw several seat changes in its favour from the Liberal Party. The Conservatives won the seats of Inverness-shire, Elginshire and Nairnshire, Stirlingshire, Dunbartonshire, Ayr Burghs, Kilmarnock Burghs, Argyllshire, Glasgow College, Glasgow St Rollox, Roxburghshire from the Liberal Party. Conversely, is lost the seats of Perth and North West Lanarkshire to the Liberals, which the party had in the last election.

The Liberal Unionist Party won around 20.6% of the vote, with the party standing 31 candidates in Scotland, a drop 1.4% in terms of vote share with the party standing fewer than in the 1892 United Kingdom general election in Scotland. It was the first election since its formation it stood fewer candidates than its ally, the Conservative Party. The party retained its seats of Wick Burghs, West Perthshire, St Andrews Burghs, Greenock, North Ayrshire, Glasgow Camlachie, Glasgow Tradeston, Partick, Edinburgh West and Peebles and Selkirk.

The Liberal Unionists also gained Inverness Burghs, Falkirk Burghs, South Ayrshire, Edinburgh South from the Liberal Party. However, it lost Dumfriesshire to the Liberals. Overall, the party saw a rise in seats from 11 at the previous election to 14 seats. Between the alliance of the parties, they held 33 of the 72 seats in Scotland, and held 47.4% of the vote share.

=== Independent Labour ===
The newly-formed Independent Labour Party ran in seats in Scotland as well as in England, with the party standing 7 in Scotland. It stood candidates in Dundee, Glasgow Blackfriars and Hutchesontown, Glasgow Bridgeton, Glasgow Camlachie, Glasgow Govan, Glasgow St Rollox and Glasgow Tradeston. However, the party took 4,269 votes at 0.8% of the vote share in Scotland, and did not win any seats in Scotland or England.

The party not standing at a general election and winning any seats directly (although in support of the future Labour Party) in the 1931 general election.

== Seats summary ==
Below is a table summarising the total number of seats, gains and losses for each party in both the territorial county and burgh constituencies and the university constituencies.

Party	Seats				
Party	Total	Gains	Losses	Net	Of all (%)
Liberal	39	3	14	▼11	54.2
Conservative-Liberal Unionist	33	14	3	▲11	45.8
Conservative	19	10	2	▲8	25.0
Liberal Unionist	14	4	1	▲3	20.8
Total	72				

== County and burgh results ==
Party	Seats					Aggregate votes		
Party	Total	Gains	Losses	Net	Of total (%)	Total	Of total (%) (Note: Adjusted for multi-member constituencies.)	Change (%)
Liberal	39	3	14	▼11	55.7	236,446	51.7	▼2.2
Conservative-Liberal Unionist	31	14	3	▲11	44.3	214,403	47.4	▲3.0
Conservative	17	10	2	▲8	24.3	118,532	26.8	▲4.4
Liberal Unionist	14	4	1	▲3	20.0	95,871	20.6	▼1.4
Ind. Labour Party	0	New			—	4,269	0.8	New
Independent Labour	0	New			—	608	0.1	New
Total	70			0	100.0	455,726	100.0	0.0
Registered voters, and turnout						580,464 (Note: Electorate in contested constituencies. The total electorate was 616,178.)	76.3	▲2.0

=== Popular vote ===
Popular vote
Liberal	51.7%
Conservative	26.8%
Liberal Unionist	20.6%
Ind. Labour Party	0.8%
Ind. Labour	0.1%

Popular vote (alliances)
Liberal	51.7%
Con-LU	47.4%
Ind. Labour Party	0.8%
Ind. Labour	0.1%

=== Parliament seats ===
Parliamentary seats
Liberal	54.2%
Conservative	25.0%
Liberal Unionist	20.8%

Parliamentary seats (alliances)
Liberal	54.2%
Con-LU	45.8%

== University constituency results ==
The two university constituencies each elected an additional member to the house. In this election both seats were uncontested, with the sitting members being returned unopposed.

=== Edinburgh and St Andrews Universities ===
General election 1895: Edinburgh and St Andrews Universities
Party	Candidate	Votes	%	±%
Conservative	Charles Pearson	Unopposed		
Conservative hold				

=== Glasgow and Aberdeen Universities ===
General election 1895: Glasgow and Aberdeen Universities
Party	Candidate	Votes	%	±%
Conservative	James Alexander Campbell	Unopposed		
Conservative hold				

== See also ==
- 1895 United Kingdom general election in England
- 1895 United Kingdom general election in Ireland
- 1895 United Kingdom general election in Wales
- List of United Kingdom Parliament constituencies (1885–1918) by region
