= H. W. Hobart =

Henry William Hobart (11 April 1856 – 18 September 1941) was a British socialist activist and trade unionist.

Born in Walworth, London (11 April 1856), Hobart completed an apprenticeship as a compositor in 1869, and joined the London Society of Compositors. He was elected several times to the executive. He worked in the temperance movement until 1884 and abstained for his entire life. He represented the London Trades Council in the union. He was an active supporter of the new unionism movement, for example, assisting Ben Tillett in the early history of the Dock, Wharf, Riverside and General Labourers' Union, and was an organiser of the London matchgirls strike of 1888.

In 1886, Hobart joined the Social Democratic Federation, and represented it at the International Workers Congresses of Paris, 1889. He stood unsuccessfully for the party in the London School Board election of 1894, in the St Pancras East constituency at the London County Council election, 1889, and in Salford South at the 1895 UK general election. Hobart was a founder of the London Workman's Committee on Housing in 1898. In 1911, he was part of a committee which relaunched the Daily Herald, and he then became a frequent contributor to the paper.

Hobart was an accomplished orator, holding audiences spellbound with stories and SDF polemic. His speaking career was derailed by an ear infection which made public speaking impossible.

By 1925, Hobart had retired. He died suddenly from a heart attack on Thursday 18 September 1941.
