= 1895 United Kingdom general election =

- 13 July – 7 August 1895

All 670 seats in the House of Commons 336 seats needed for a majority
- Registered: 4,597,886 (Note: Electorate in contested constituencies. The total electorate was 6,330,519.)
- Turnout: 3,866,282; 78.4% (▲1.0 pp)
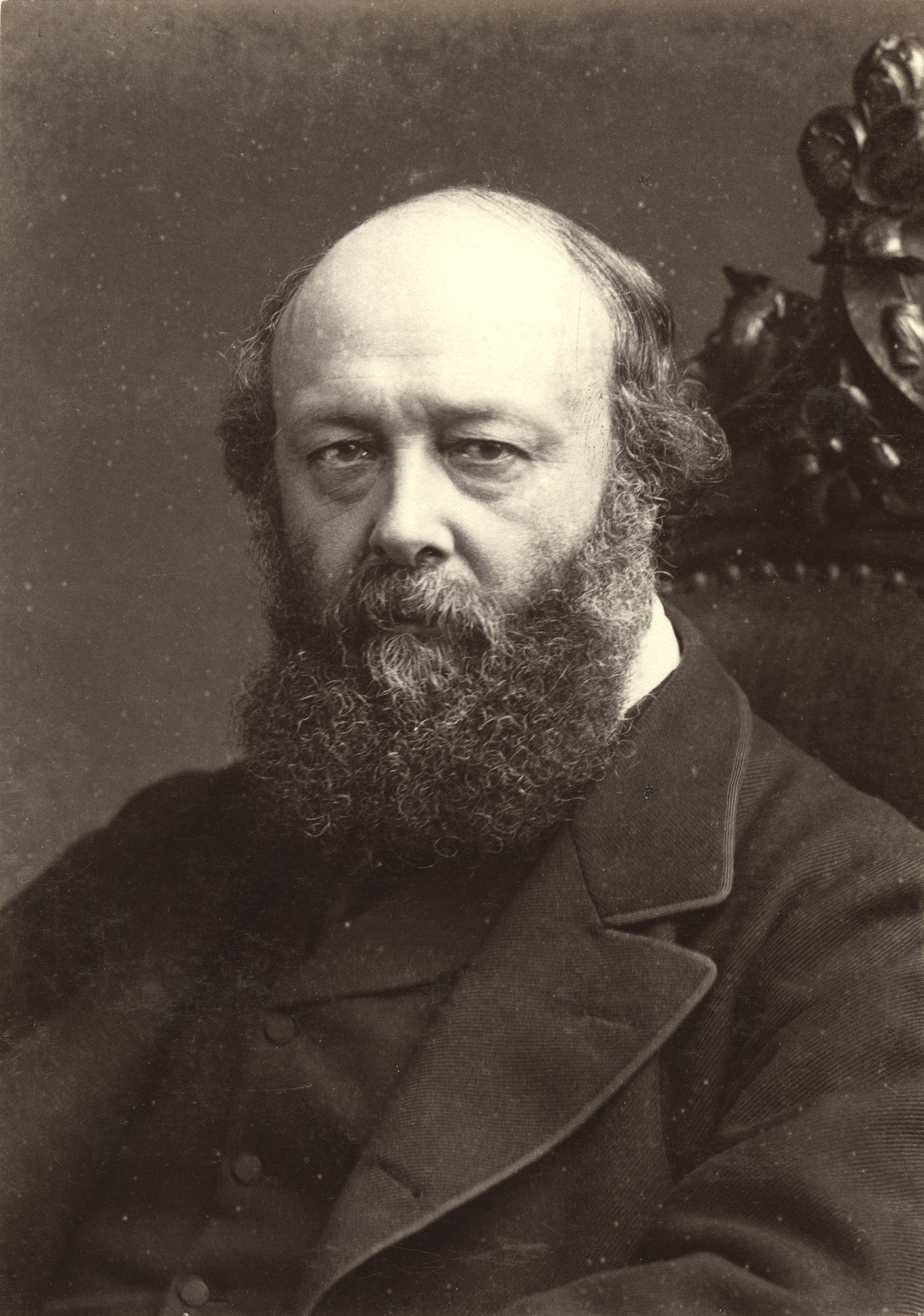

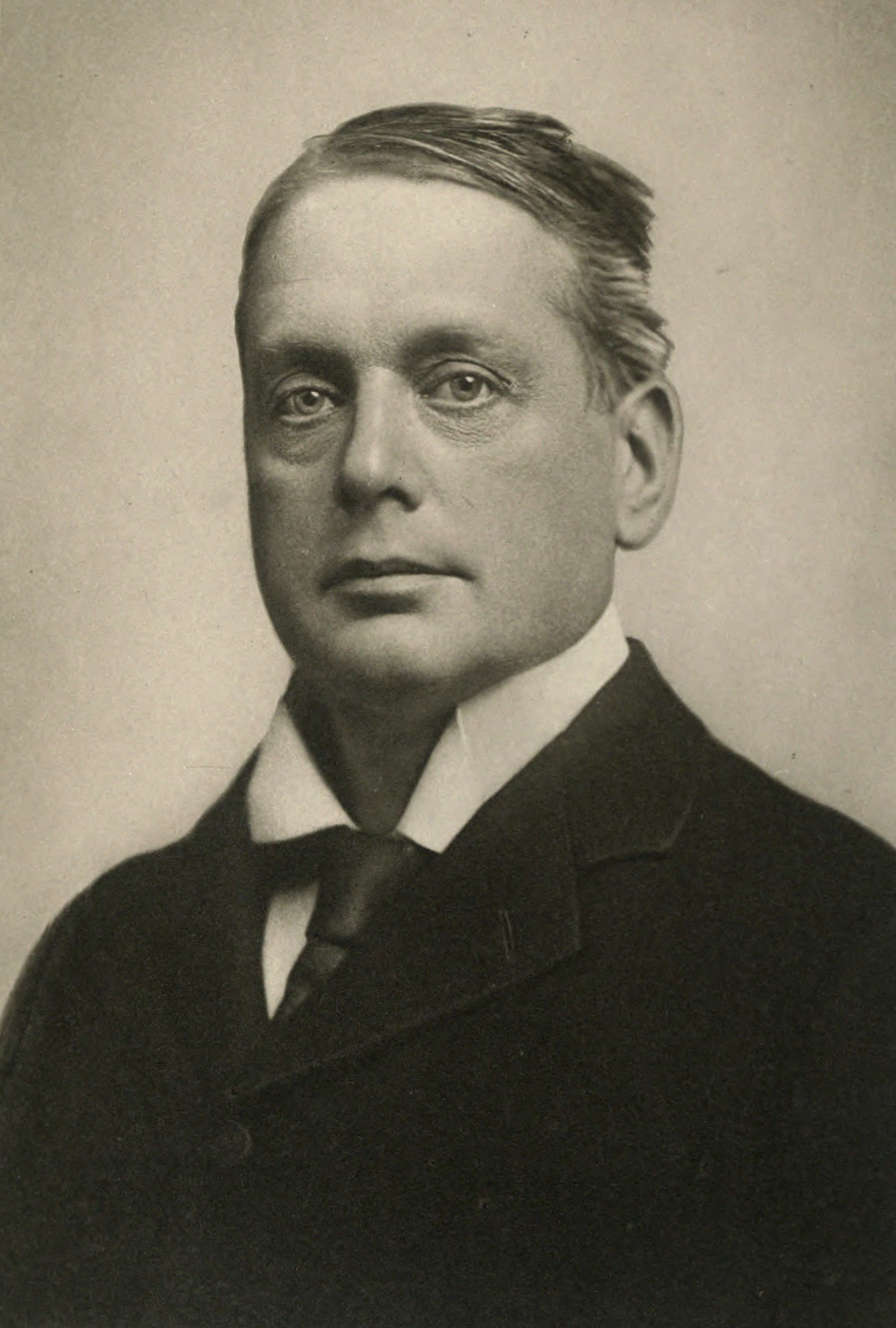

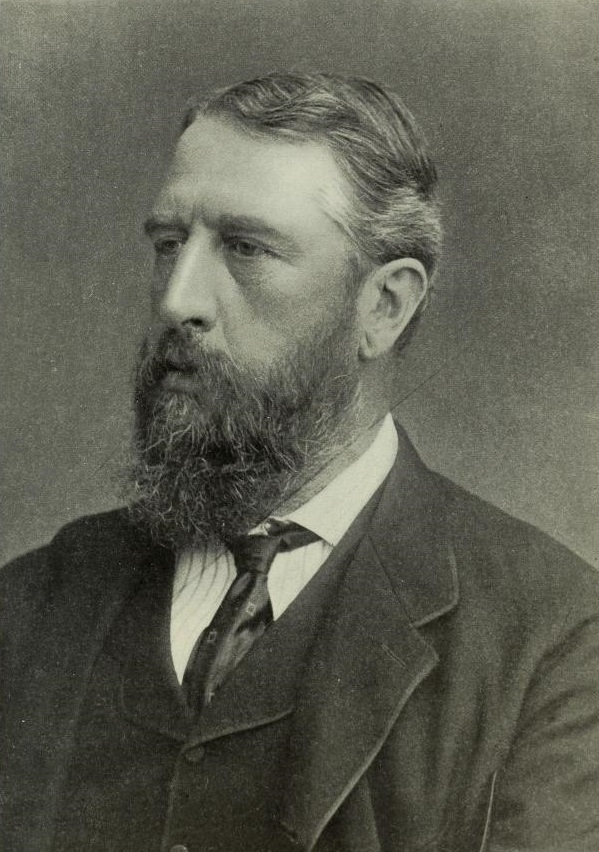

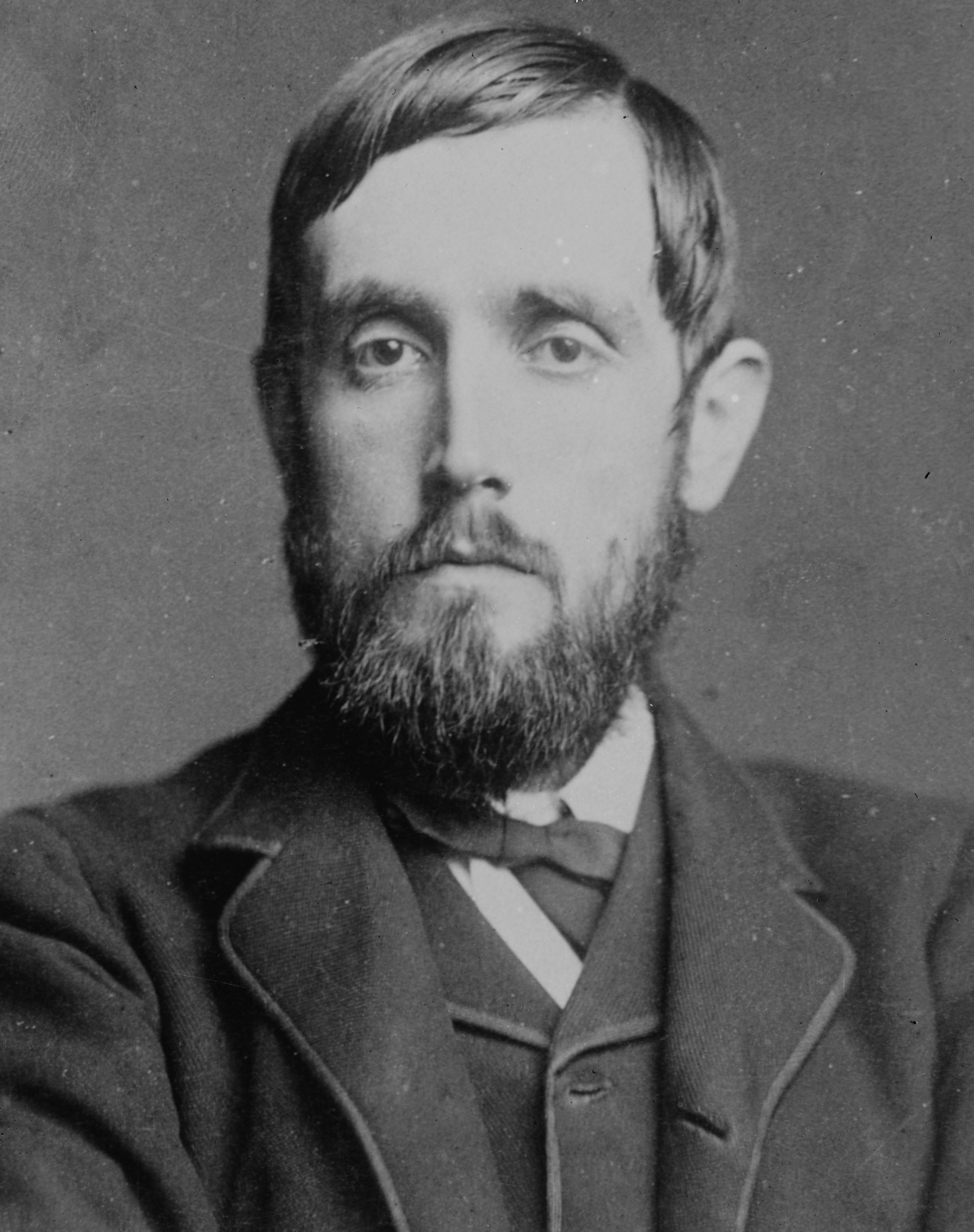

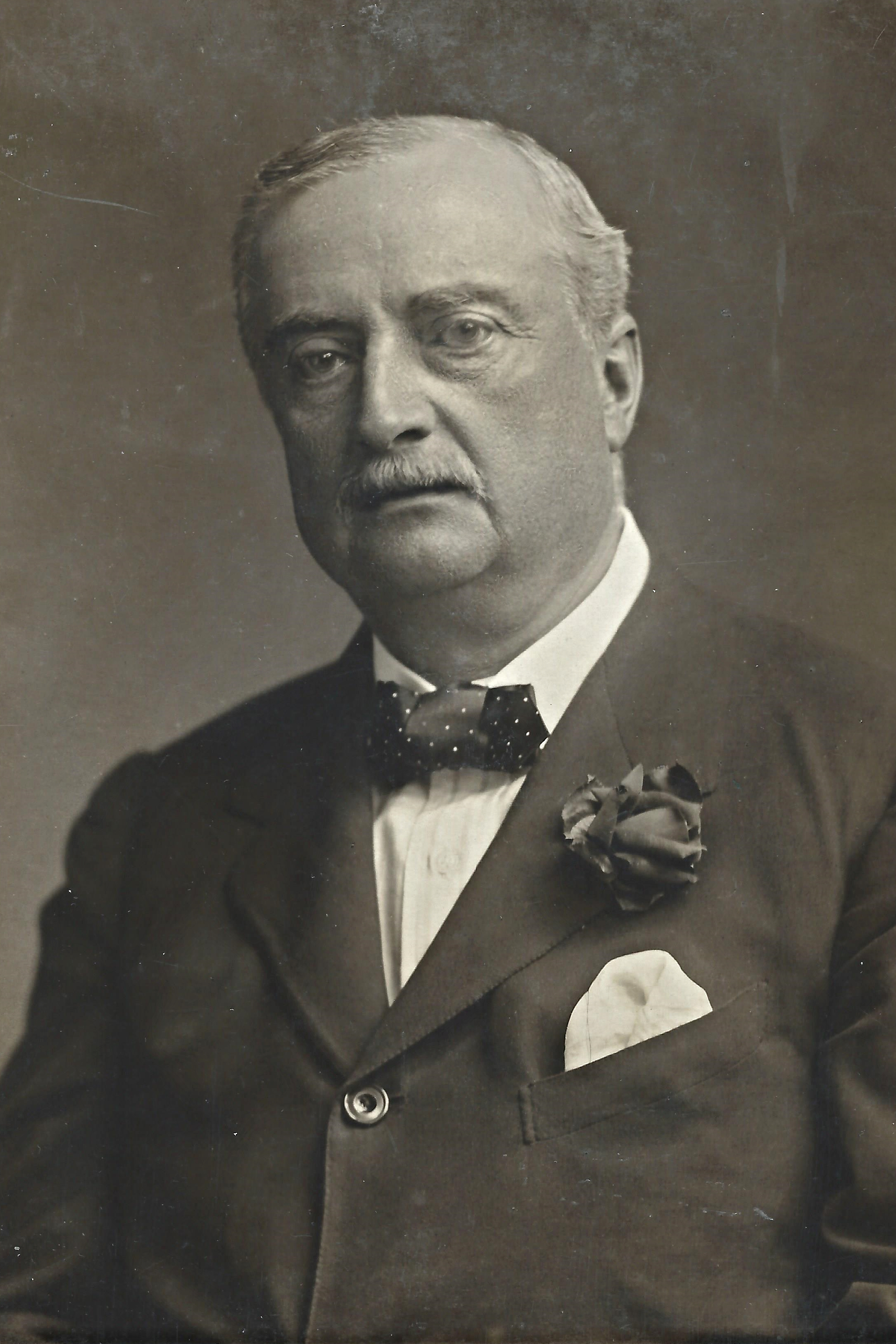

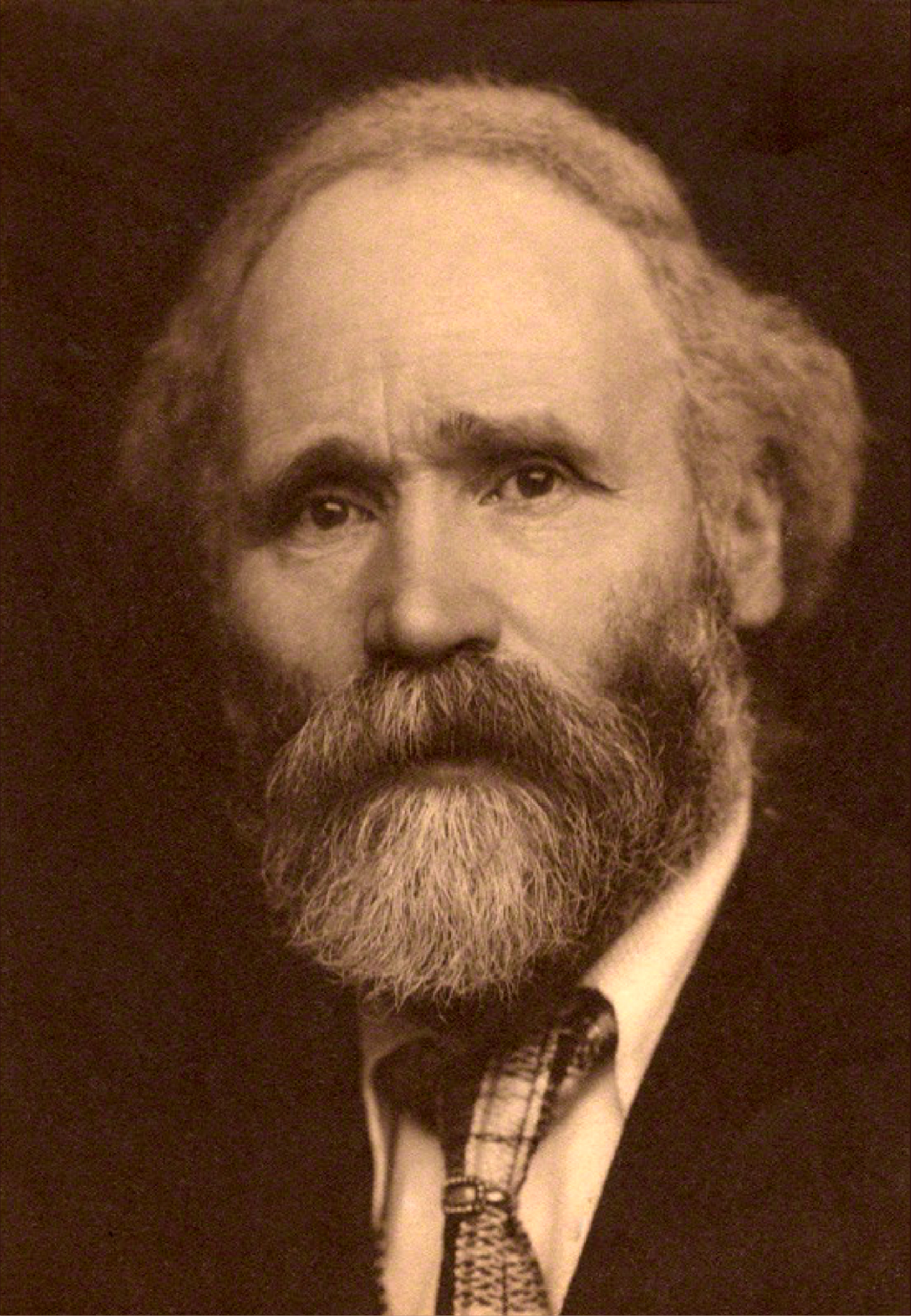
	First party	Second party	Third party
Leader	Marquess of Salisbury	Earl of Rosebery	Duke of Devonshire
Party	Conservative	Liberal	Liberal Unionist
Alliance	Conservative-Liberal Unionist		Conservative-Liberal Unionist
Leader since	April 1881	5 March 1894	1886
Leader's seat	House of Lords	House of Lords	House of Lords
Last election	267 seats, 36.8%	271 seats, 45.4%	48 seats, 10.2%
Seats won	340	177 (Note: Figure includes Speaker of the House of Commons William Court Gully in Carlisle.)	71
Seat change	▲73	▼94	▲23
Popular vote	1,538,194	1,759,814	358,672
Percentage	39.8%	45.6%	9.3%
Swing	▲3.0 pp	▲0.2 pp	▼0.9
	Fourth party	Fifth party	Sixth party
Leader	John Dillon	John Redmond	Keir Hardie
Party	Irish National Federation	Irish National League	Ind. Labour Party
Leader since	1892	October 1891	1893
Leader's seat	East Mayo	Waterford City	West Ham South (lost seat)
Last election	72 seats, 5.2%	9 seats, 1.5%	Did not contest
Seats won	70	12	0
Seat change	▼2	▲3	Steady
Popular vote	97,804	52,678	44,325
Percentage	2.6%	1.3%	1.0%
Swing	▼2.6 pp	▼0.2 pp	New party
- Colours denote the winning party

- Diagram showing the composition of the House of Commons following the election
Prime Minister before election
Marquess of Salisbury
Conservative
Prime Minister after
election
Marquess of Salisbury
Conservative

The 1895 United Kingdom general election was held from 13 July to 7 August 1895. The Conservative Party, in alliance with the Liberal Unionist Party, won a parliamentary majority of 153.

William Gladstone had retired as prime minister in the previous year, and Queen Victoria, disregarding Gladstone's advice to name Lord Spencer as his successor, had appointed the Earl of Rosebery as the new prime minister. Rosebery's government found itself largely in a state of paralysis due to a power struggle between him and William Harcourt, the Liberal Party leader in the Commons. The situation came to a head on 21 June, when Parliament voted to dismiss Secretary of State for War Henry Campbell-Bannerman; Rosebery, realising that the government would likely not survive a motion of no confidence were one to be brought, promptly resigned as prime minister. Conservative leader Lord Salisbury was subsequently re-appointed for a third spell as prime minister, and promptly called a new election.

The Liberal Party, in contrast, went down to what at the time was its worst result since the party's foundation, winning just 177 seats. The Irish Parliamentary Party was split at this time; most of its MPs (the "Anti-Parnellites") followed John Dillon, while a rump (the "Parnellites") followed John Redmond. The Independent Labour Party, having only previously existed as a loose grouping of left-wing politicians, formally organized into a party led by Keir Hardie in 1893 and contested its first election. It earned relatively little attention at this election, winning slightly less than one per cent of the popular vote and no seats, but would enjoy greater success five years later, when it ran under the banner of the Labour Representation Committee.

This was the last United Kingdom general election in which neither the incumbent prime minister nor leader of the main opposition party sat in the House of Commons, with Rosebery and Salisbury both sitting in the House of Lords, and William Harcourt and Arthur Balfour respectively acting as the Commons leaders for the Liberals and Conservatives.

== Candidates ==
Below is a table summarising the candidates of the 1895 general election.

Affiliation	Candidates
Conservative Party	445
Liberal Party	445 (Note: Includes 26 Liberal-Labour candidates.)
Liberal Unionist Party	111
Irish National Federation	77 (Note: Includes T. P. O'Connor stood in Liverpool Scotland.)
Irish Unionist Party	33
Independent Labour Party	28
Irish National League	26
Social Democratic Federation	4 (Note: The candidates that stood were Leader Henry Hyndman in Burnley, Frederick George Jones in Northampton, H. W. Hobart in Salford South and George Lansbury in Walworth.)
Independent Liberal	4 (Note: The candidates that stood were Nelson P. Palmer in Camberwell North, William Wightman in Kennington, J. M. Robertson in Northampton and George Reginald Leeper stood in North Fermanagh.)
Independent Nationalist	2 (Note: The candidates that stood were William Archibald Macdonald in Ossory and Thomas Shillington in South Tyrone.)
Independent Labour	2 (Note: The candidates that stood were Alton William Hillen in Cheltenham and John Lincoln Mahon in Aberdeen North.)
Independent Liberal-Labour	2 (Note: The candidates that stood were Allen Upward in Merthyr Tydfil and Ernest Hall Hedley in Swansea District.)
Independent	1 (Note: Candidate John Leighton stood in St Pancras North.)
Total	1,180

== Outcome ==
=== Liberal Party ===
The Liberal Party saw a drastic fall in seats across the counrty, with the party losing several seats to the Conservative Party and Liberal Unionists. It maintained 45.6% of the vote share, with a minor drop of 0.2% when compared to the previous election.

In England, the party lost 92 seats. However it gained Penryn and Falmouth, Colchester, Prestwich, Stockton-on-Tees, Hexham, Scarborough and Pontefract from the Conservatives. It also gained Nottingham West and Lichfield from the Liberal Unionists. It also gained one of the two seats in two-seated constituencies of Plymouth, Ipswich and Bolton from the Conservatives, with the Conservative Party holding the others.

From others, it gained Battersea from being an Independent Labour seat, with incumbent John Burns retaining it personally, but having joined the Liberal-Labour faction of the Liberal Party, won it for the Liberal Party. Similarly, in Middlesbrough, Havelock Wilson, who was an Independent Labour MP, joined the Liberal-Labour factions under the Liberal sponsorship. His retention was also a gain for the Liberals.

Amongst the Liberal-Labour candidates, they held North West Norfolk, Mid Durham, Morpeth, Wansbeck, Normanton. There was a gain in Leicester with a Liberal-Labour dual candidate, following a by-election in 1904 after both Liberals in the two-member seat resigned from Parliament. Liberal-Labour candidate Henry Broadhurst took one of the two seats in the two-seat by-election, and retained its for the faction at this election as a sitting MP. But the faction also lost Bethnal Green North East, Finsbury East, Haggerston in the County of London, as well as Ince to the Conservative Party. It also lost Shipley to the Liberal Unionists. In Wales, William Abraham held in Rhondda.

In Scotland, the party saw a very minor 2.2% drop in vote share, taking 51.7% of the votes in Scotland, but thereby maintaining its majority in votes. However, it saw a loss of 14 seats, primarily to the Conservative Party, and some to the Liberal Unionists. It did see 3 gains in exchanges with the latter parties as well. Overall, at 39 seats, it did maintain the majority of seats in Scotland.

In Ireland, the Liberals regained direct representation, with the their candidate Charles Hemphill winning North Tyrone from the Irish Unionist Party. The party would retain the seat until its abolition.

=== Conservative Party ===
The Conservative Party saw a slight increase in vote share of around 1.6%, but with a significant increase in seats across England. The party lost only 12 seats, two of which were uncontested exchanges with its ally, the Liberal Unionist Party. Its other losses were to the Liberal party. It otherwise gained 73 seats, primarily from the Liberal Party, but also including two from the Liberal Unionists.

The party retained it 4 seats in the English university constituencies, and an overall 292 seats in the county and borough constituencies, to a total seat count of 296 seats. When combined with the results of the Liberal Unionist Party, they held a combined 343 county and borough seats, as well as all 5 university constituency seats. And, when combined with the results across the United Kingdom, the Conservative Party and its allies the Liberal Unionist Party took a landslide victory over the Liberal Party nationally, forming government once again and Lord Salisbury returning as Prime Minister.

In Scotland, it saw a rise in seats by 8 seats, from 11 to 19. The party held the university constituency seats of Edinburgh and St Andrews Universities and Glasgow and Aberdeen Universities. It also held the county and borough seats of East Renfrewshire, West Renfrewshire, Buteshire, Glasgow Central, South Lanarkshire, Kirkcudbright Stewartry and Wigtownshire.

It saw several seat changes in its favour from the Liberal Party. The Conservatives won the seats of Inverness-shire, Elginshire and Nairnshire, Stirlingshire, Dunbartonshire, Ayr Burghs, Kilmarnock Burghs, Argyllshire, Glasgow College, Glasgow St Rollox, Roxburghshire from the Liberal Party. Conversely, is lost the seats of Perth and North West Lanarkshire to the Liberals, which the party had in the last election.

In Wales, the Conservatives won Radnorshire, Pembroke and Haverfordwest, Cardiff, South Glamorganshire, Swansea Town from the Liberal Party. It otherwise retained Montgomery, Denbigh Boroughs and South Monmouthshire. Finally, in Ireland,

In Ireland, the Irish Unionist Party, which stood under the Whip of the Conservatives party, took 17 seats, a decrease of one seat. This was North Tyrone to the Liberal Party.

=== Liberal Unionist Party ===
The Liberal Unionist Party, led by the Duke of Devonshire (and Joseph Chamberlain in the House of Commons), saw a gain of 20 seats in England.The party retained Bodmin, St Ives, Truro, Totnes, East Somerset, Aylesbury, St Pancras South, South Norfolk, Sudbury, Ludlow, Wellington (Shropshire), Handsworth, West Staffordshire, Wolverhampton South, Ross, Droitwich, East Worcestershire, Warwick and Leamington and West Derbyshire. It retained one of the two seats in Bath, as well as its university constituency seat in London University. It also held its Birmingham provincial borough seats of Birmingham Bordesley, Birmingham Central, Birmingham Edgbaston, Birmingham North, Birmingham South and Birmingham West.

The party won Camborne, Barnstaple, Bristol North, Gloucester, Cricklade, Lambeth North, Biggleswade, Stoke-upon-Trent, North Worcestershire, Lincoln, Spalding, Peterborough, Heywood, Liverpool Exchange, North Lonsdale, Manchester South, Darlington, South East Durham, The Hartlepools, Bradford Central, Shipley and Skipton from the Liberal Party. It also one of the two seats in Southampton also from the Liberals. Additionally, it won Marylebone West from the Conservative Party, with the Conservative incumbent MP retiring from Parliament and not standing a candidate against its ally. William Wentworth-Fitzwilliam also entered Parliament in Wakefield. This was a win from the Conservatives, where the Conservatives again did not stand a candidate.

However, lost Westminster St George's, Hannover Square to the Conservative Party due to incumbent George Goschen joining the Conservative Party and standing as its candidate at this election. It also lost Bury and Hythe to the Conservatives, with the Liberal Unionist incumbent MPs retiring, and the party not standing against the Conservatives. Outside the alliance with the Conservatives, it lost Nottingham West and Lichfield to the Liberal Party. Overall, the Liberal Unionists lost 5 seats but gained 25, an increase of 20 seats at 52 seats total (51 being county and borough MPs, with 1 in the university constituency of London University) in England compared to the last election.

In Scotland, it was the first election since its formation it stood fewer candidates than its ally, the Conservative Party. The party retained its seats of Wick Burghs, West Perthshire, St Andrews Burghs, Greenock, North Ayrshire, Glasgow Camlachie, Glasgow Tradeston, Partick, Edinburgh West and Peebles and Selkirk.

The Liberal Unionists also gained Inverness Burghs, Falkirk Burghs, South Ayrshire, Edinburgh South from the Liberal Party. However, it lost Dumfriesshire to the Liberals. Overall, the party saw a rise in seats from 11 at the previous election to 14 seats. Between the alliance of the parties, they held 33 of the 72 seats in Scotland, and held 47.4% of the vote share.

In Wales, party suffered a large swing against it due largely to the party only having stood two candidates in Wales: John Jones Jenkins in Carmarthen Boroughs and William Joseph Buckley in West Carmarthenshire. Jenkins, who had run in Carmarthen Boroughs in the previous two elections unsuccessfully, won the constituency from the Liberal Party, returning to Parliament in the constituency after having lost his seat in 1886. Buckley was unsuccessful in West Carmarthenshire, but took 42.8% of the vote in the constituency. It was the last election at which the Liberal Unionists would hold elected political representation in Wales, before the party formally merged with the Conservative Party in 1912.

In Ireland the party took 4 seats: Belfast West, South Londonderry, South Tyrone and Dublin St Stephen's Green.

=== Independent Labour Party ===
The newly-formed Independent Labour Party under its leader Keir Hardie stood for the first time at this election, with the party standing candidates in 21 candidates in England and 7 in Scotland. However, the party saw no success, with it not gaining any seats in England or Scotland. Additionally, Hardie himself lost his seat of West Ham South to the Conservative Party, although the gain was technically from Hardie as an Independent Labour MP from the previous election.

The ILP would stand in subsequent elections in smaller numbers, but would not gain seats at any until the 1931 general election, although it was through sponsoring candidates in support of the future Labour Party.

Hardie would go on to return to Parliament in the 1900 United Kingdom general election in Wales, as part of the Labour Representation Committee which he would found following this election.

== Results ==
The following tables are based on the collations of seats and votes collected by F. W. S. Craig for the results in Great Britain, and seats and votes collected by Brian Mercer Walker for Ireland. The distinctions made between the Conservatives, Irish Unionists and Liberal Unionists in alterations to these works are set out according to Wesley Ferris.

=== Summary of seats returned ===
Party	Leader	MPs		Aggregate votes	
Party	Leader		Of total		Of total (Note: Adjusted for multi-member constituencies.)
Conservative-Liberal Unionist	Marquess of Salisbury	411	61.3%	1,894,772	49.2%
Conservative Party	Marquess of Salisbury	323	48.2%	1,502,001	38.9%
Liberal Unionist Party	Duke of Devonshire	71	10.6%	358,672	9.3%
Irish Unionist Party (Note: Stood under the Conservative Party Whip; all figures are attributed to the Conservative Party nationally.)	Edward James Saunderson	17	2.5%	36,193	0.9%
Liberal Party	Lord Rosebery	177 (Note: Includes 9 Liberal-Labour MPs.)	26.4%	1,759,814	45.6%
Irish National Federation	Charles Stewart Parnell	70 (Note: Includes T. P. O'Connor in Liverpool Scotland.)	10.4%	97,804	2.6%
Irish National League	John Redmond	12	1.8%	52,678	1.3%

=== Full results ===

UK General Election 1895
		Candidates						Votes		
Party	Leader	Stood	Elected	Gained	Unseated	Net	% of total	%	No.	Net %
Conservative and Liberal Unionist	Lord Salisbury	589	411	114	17	+97	61.34	49.25	1,759,484	+2.2
Liberal	Lord Rosebery	445	177	18	112	−94	26.42	45.58	1,628,405	+0.2
Irish National Federation	John Dillon	77	70			−2	10.45	2.59	92,556	−2.6
Irish National League	John Redmond	26	12			+3	1.79	1.34	47,698	−0.2
Ind. Labour Party	Keir Hardie	28	0			0	0	0.96	34,433	N/A
Independent Liberal	N/A	3	0			−1	0	0.10	3,733	
Social Democratic Federation	H. M. Hyndman	4	0			0	0	0.09	3,122	+0.1
Independent Lib-Lab	N/A	2	0			0	0	0.07	2,348	
Independent Labour	N/A	1	0			−3	0	0.02	608	
Independent	N/A	2	0	0	0	0	0	0.00	52	

=== Popular vote ===
Popular vote
Liberal	45.6%
Conservative	39.9%
Liberal Unionist	9.3%
Nat. Federation	2.6%
Nat. League	1.3%
Others	0.2%

Popular vote (alliances)
Con-LU	49.2%
Liberal	45.6%
Nat. Federation	2.6%
Nat. League	1.3%
Others	0.2%

=== Parliament seats ===
Parliamentary seats
Conservative	50.7%
Liberal	26.4%
Liberal Unionist	10.6%
Nat. Federation	10.4%
Nat. League	1.8%

Parliamentary seats (alliances)
Con-LU	61.3%
Liberal	26.4%
Nat. Federation	10.4%
Nat. League	1.8%

== See also ==
- 1895 United Kingdom general election in England
- 1895 United Kingdom general election in Ireland
- 1895 United Kingdom general election in Scotland
- 1895 United Kingdom general election in Wales
- List of United Kingdom Parliament constituencies (1885–1918) by region
- List of MPs elected in the 1895 United Kingdom general election
- Parliamentary franchise in the United Kingdom 1885–1918
