= 1895 vote of no confidence in the Rosebery ministry =

British parliamentary motion

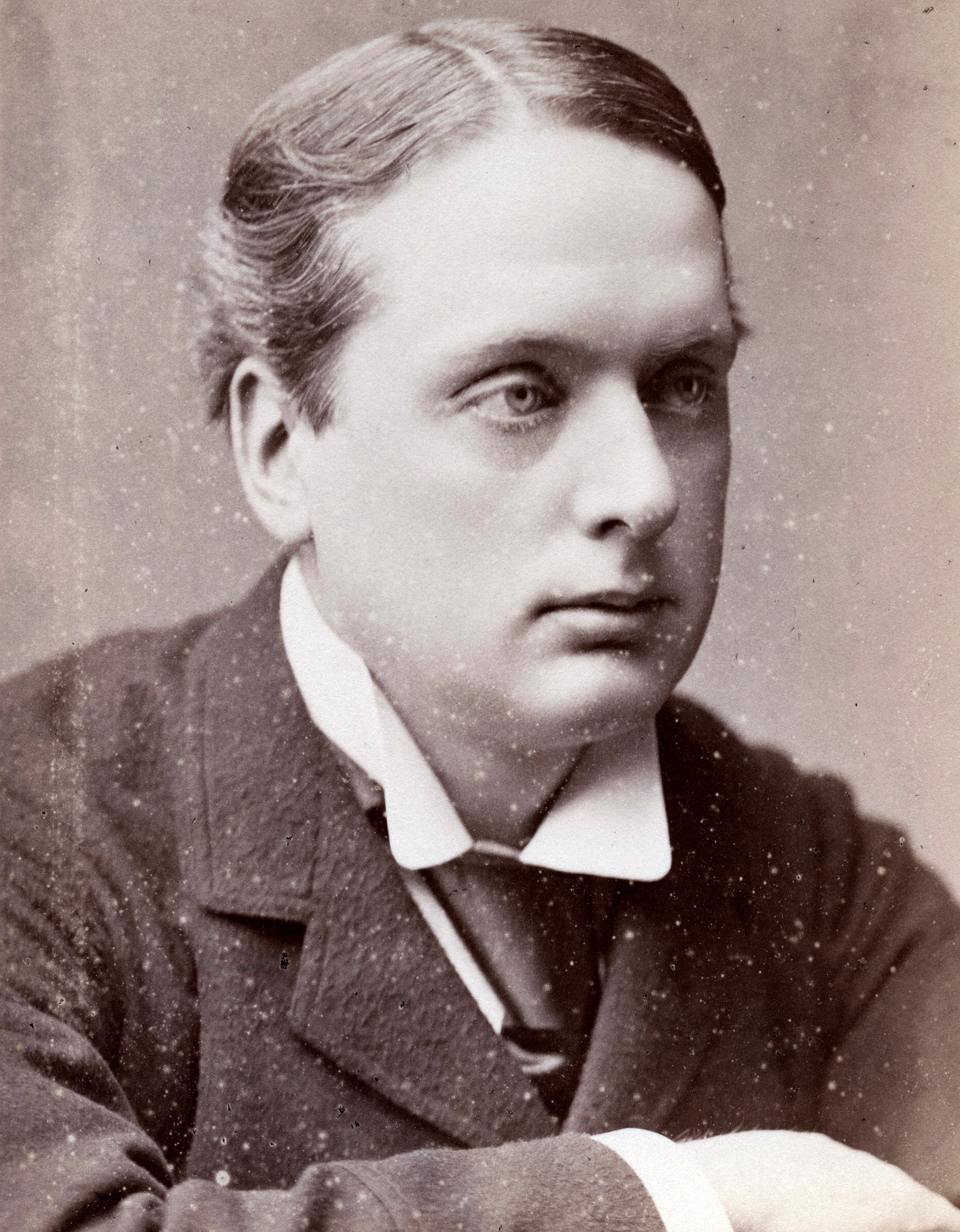
Lord Rosebery lost the vote of no confidence by seven votes.

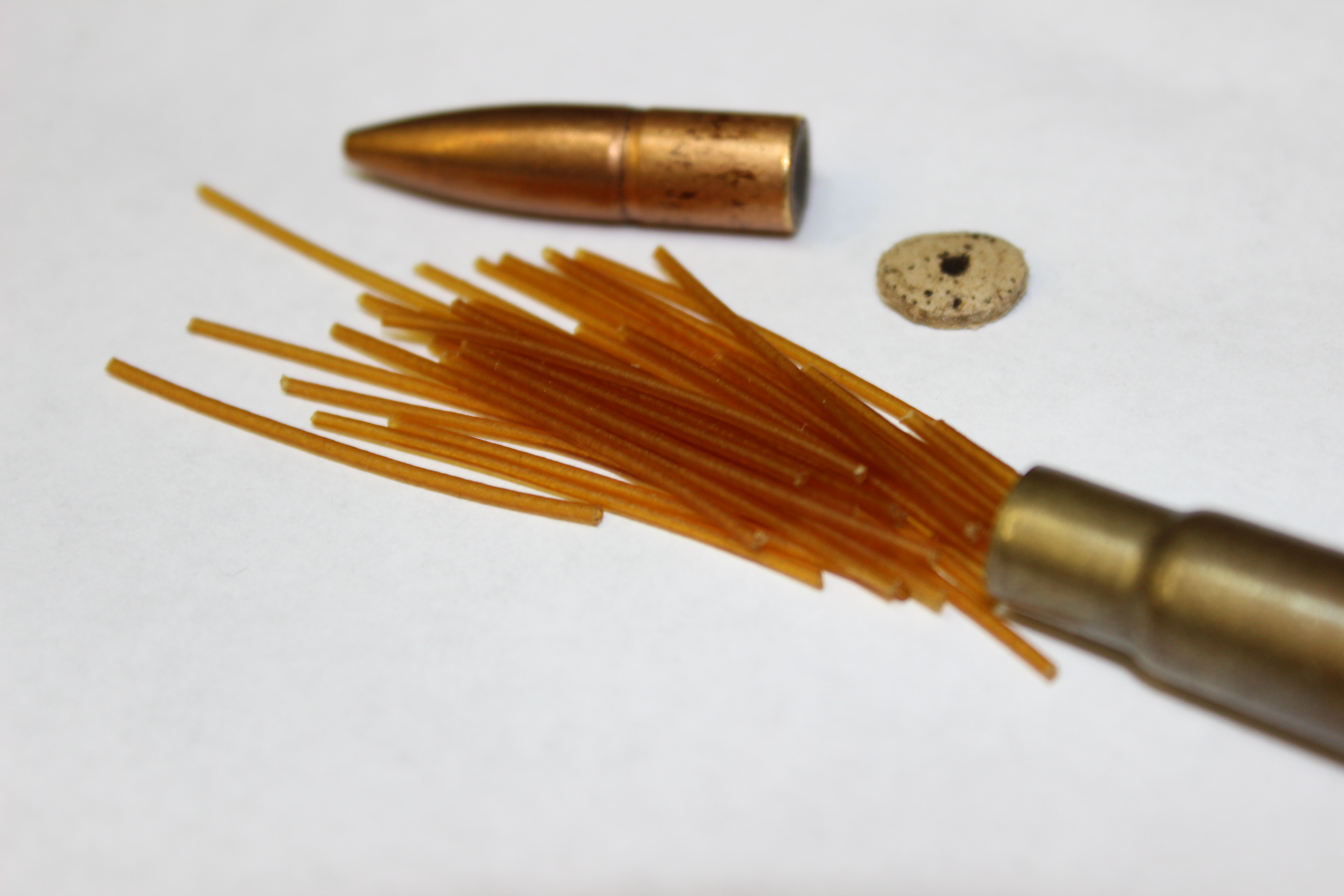
The deficient supply of Cordite (pictured) precipitated the vote.

The vote of no confidence in the Rosebery ministry of 21 June 1895, also known as the Cordite vote, was the occasion on which the Liberal Government of the Earl of Rosebery was defeated in a vote of censure by the House of Commons. The motion was to reduce the salary of the Secretary of State for War as a censure over deficient supply of cordite to the Army. When it was passed, the Secretary of State Henry Campbell-Bannerman offered his resignation. As Campbell-Bannerman was the most popular Minister in a Government which was suffering internal division and whose members had grown tired of office, the Government chose to interpret the issue as one involving confidence in the Government and therefore resigned. The incoming Conservative government soon sought a dissolution of Parliament and won the ensuing general election. The vote is the last time in the History of the British Parliament that a government has been defeated on a confidence motion when it had a workable majority.

== Background ==
Archibald Primrose, 5th Earl of Rosebery had become Prime Minister in March 1894, following William Ewart Gladstone's resignation, being the personal choice of Queen Victoria. Rosebery was told by the Queen's emissary (her physician, Sir James Reid) that he was "the only man of your party she likes and trusts". His choice over several other men with larger followings in the party, particularly Sir William Harcourt and John Morley led to inevitable tension, and Harcourt in particular did nothing to help the Government out of its difficulties. The Government was dependent on the Irish Parliamentary Party for its majority in the House of Commons, but could offer them little towards their goals as Gladstone's Second Home Rule Bill had been defeated by the House of Lords in 1893.

=== Cordite ===
Cordite was a new form of explosive which had only come into use a few years before 1895, and the Army was in the process of equipping with it. In the Army Estimates for 1895, Secretary of State for War Henry Campbell-Bannerman reported that new barrels for the Army's .303 rifles which were suitable for cordite bullets were being fitted, but that "it is unnecessary at present to provide for more than a liberally estimated supply for one year". The Conservative frontbench had been assured privately that there were adequate supplies, and cordite could be manufactured quickly, but the party chose to raise the issue in the House of Commons on 21 June when the Army Estimates came up for debate.

== Motion and Vote ==
The motion was made during committee and so the vote had a low turnout compared with other votes of no confidence. The opposition therefore made a motion that the secretary of war's salary be reduced by £100, effectively removing the confidence of the house from the secretary of state. The motion was passed by 7 votes. While this might have been treated merely as a vote of no confidence in Secretary for War Campbell-Bannerman, Rosebery chose to treat it as a vote of censure on his government. On 22 June, he and his ministers tendered their resignations to the Queen, who invited the Unionist leader, Lord Salisbury, to form a government. The following month, the Unionists won a crushing victory in the 1895 general election, and held power for ten years (1895–1905) under Salisbury and Arthur Balfour.

Yes votes	132
No votes	125
