= Cummings (surname) =

Cummings is a surname.

As an Irish surname, it is anglicised from Irish Gaelic surname Ó Comáin.

== People ==
=== A ===
- Abbott Lowell Cummings (1923–2017), American architectural historian
- Alan C. Cummings, American astrophysicist
- Albert Cummings (born 1968), American guitarist
- Alexander Cummings (territorial governor) (1810–1879), American general and politician
- Alexander B. Cummings Jr. (born 1956), Liberian politician
- Alma Carrie Cummings (1857–1926), American journalist
- Amos J. Cummings (1841–1902), American politician
- Andrew Boyd Cummings (1830–1863), American army officer
- Ann Cummings (born 1946), American businesswoman and politician
- Anne Marie Cummings (born 1967), American actress
- Asa Cummings (1790–1856), American minister and author
- Ashleigh Cummings (born 1992), Australian actress
- Aubrey Cummings (1947–2010), Guyanese musician

=== B ===
- Bart Cummings (1927–2015), Australian racehorse trainer
- Bill Cummings (disambiguation)
- Brian Cummings (disambiguation)
- Bruce Cummings (1927–1991), Canadian football player
- Burtland Cummings (born 1965), Canadian football player
- Burton Cummings (born 1947), Canadian songwriter
- Byron Cummings (1860–1954), American archaeologist

=== C ===
- Candy Cummings (1848–1924), American baseball player
- Carol Cummings (born 1949), Jamaican sprinter
- Chance Cummings (1892–1974), American baseball player
- Charles Cummings (disambiguation)
- Chester Cummings, American politician
- Chris Cummings (born 1975), Canadian singer-songwriter
- Chris A. Cummings (born 1969), Canadian musician
- Clara Eaton Cummings (1855–1906), American botanist
- Clarence Cummings (born 2000), American weightlifter
- Claude Cummings (1917–1965), Australian rules footballer
- Colin Cummings (born 1999), American air hockey player
- Conrad Cummings (born 1948), American composer
- Conrad Cummings (boxer) (born 1991), English boxer
- Constance Cummings (1910–2005), American-British actress

=== D ===
- Damon Cummings (disambiguation)
- Daniel Cummings (born 2006), Scottish footballer
- Danielle Cummings (born 1997), American paratriathlete
- David Cummings (disambiguation), multiple people
- D. C. Cummings (1861–1942), British trade unionist
- Dean Cummings (born 1993), Scottish footballer
- Denis Joseph Cummings (1885–1956), New Zealand policeman
- Dominic Cummings (born 1971), British political strategist
- Don Cummings, American playwright
- Dorothy Smith Cummings (1903–1995), American archer
- Douglas Cummings (1946–2014), British cellist
- Duncan Cummings (born 1958), Australian soccer player

=== E ===
- Ed Cummings (disambiguation)
- Edith Cummings (1899–1984), American socialite
- Edwin Cummings (1885–1951), New Zealand cricketer
- E. E. Cummings (1894–1962), American poet
- Eileen Cummings (born 1943), Australian politician
- Elijah Cummings (1951–2019), American politician
- Elisabeth Cummings (born 1934), Australian artist
- Eliza Cummings (born 1991), English model
- Emerson LeRoy Cummings (1902–1986), American army general
- Emma G. Cummings (1856–1940), American horticulturalist
- Emmanuel Cummings, British politician and colonist
- Eric Douglas Cummings (1896–1979), Australian army pilot
- Erin Cummings (born 1977), American actress
- Eustace Henry Taylor Cummings (1890–1967), British doctor
- Everald Cummings (born 1948), Trinidadian footballer

=== F ===
- Felicia Cummings (born 1968), Trinidadian cricketer
- Foster Cummings (born 1973), Trinidadian politician
- Frank Cummings (1891–1954), Australian rower
- Frank E. Cummings III (born 1938), American professor
- Fred Cummings, American theoretical physicist
- Fred N. Cummings (1864–1952), American politician

=== G ===
- Gaylord G. Cummings (1894–1981), American politician
- George Cummings (disambiguation)
- Glen Cummings (disambiguation)
- Grace Shimm Cummings (1865–1910), American educator

=== H ===
- Harold Cummings (born 1992), Panamanian footballer
- Harry S. Cummings (1866–1917), American lawyer
- Henry J. B. Cummings (1831–1909), American politician
- Herbert Wesley Cummings (1873–1956), American politician
- Homer Stille Cummings (1870–1956), American politician
- Horace H. Cummings (1858–1937), American educator and religious figure

=== I ===
- Ida R. Cummings (1867–1958), American teacher
- Iris Cummings (1920–2025), American aviator and Olympic swimmer
- Irving Cummings (1888–1959), American actor
- Ivor Cummings (1913–1992), British civil servant
- Ivy Cummings (1901–1971), American stock car racing driver

=== J ===
- Jack Cummings (disambiguation)
- Jacob Abbot Cummings (1773–1820), American publisher
- James Cummings (disambiguation)
- Jane Cummings, English nurse
- Jason Cummings (born 1995), Scottish footballer
- Jeanne Cummings, American columnist
- Jeffrey Cummings, American professor
- Jeremiah Cummings (disambiguation)
- Jeremy Cummings (born 1976), American baseball player
- Jim Cummings (born 1952), American voice actor
- Jim Cummings (filmmaker) (born 1986), American filmmaker
- Jo Cummings (born 1998), English footballer
- Joan Cummings (disambiguation)
- Joe Cummings (disambiguation)
- John Cummings (disambiguation)
- Johnna Lee Cummings (born 1971), American pop singer
- Joseph Cummings (1817–1890), American academic administrator
- Joy Cummings (1923–2003), Australian politician
- Joy Cummings (tennis) (born 1962), American tennis player

=== K ===
- Karen Cummings, Guyanese politician
- Kathleen Cummings (born 1961), American tennis player
- Kenwin Cummings (born 1986), American football player
- Keron Cummings (born 1988), Trinidadian footballer
- Kevin Cummings (born 1990), American football coach

=== L ===
- Laurence Cummings (born 1968), British organist
- Leslie Cummings, American politician
- Linda Cummings, British-American applied mathematician
- Louise Duffield Cummings (1870–1947), Canadian-American mathematician

=== M ===
- Mac Cummings (born 1979), American entrepreneur
- Mack Cummings (born 1959), American football player
- Marcus F. Cummings (1836–1905), American architect
- Marian Cummings (1892–1984), American pilot
- Marion Cummings (1876–1926), American philosopher
- Markeith Cummings (born 1988), American basketball player
- Marti Gould Cummings, American drag queen and activist
- Martin Marc Cummings (1920–2011), American professor
- Mary Cummings (1839–1927), American philanthropist
- Maxwell Cummings (1898–2001), Canadian builder
- Maya Rockeymoore Cummings (born 1971), American politician
- Melvin Earl Cummings (1876–1936), American sculptor
- Michael Cummings (1919–1997), English cartoonist
- Michael A. Cummings (born 1945), American artist
- Milton K. Cummings (1911–1973), American business executive
- Midre Cummings (born 1971), American baseball player
- Missy Cummings (born 1966), American professor
- Monette Cummings (1914–1999), American writer

=== N ===
- Nathan Cummings (1896–1985), American architect
- Nicholas Cummings (1924–2020), American psychologist

=== O ===
- Omar Cummings (born 1982), Jamaican footballer
- Osmond Richard Cummings (1923–2013), American historian

=== P ===
- Pat Cummings (disambiguation)
- Paul Cummings (1953–2001), American long-distance runner
- Percy Cummings (born 1946), Australian rules footballer
- Peter Cummings (disambiguation)
- Phil Cummings, Australian author
- Philip Cummings (1906–1991), American public speaker
- Priscilla Cummings (born 1951), American author

=== Q ===
- Quinn Cummings (born 1967), American businesswoman

=== R ===
- Ray Cummings (1887–1957), American writer
- Richard Cummings (disambiguation)
- Robert Cummings (disambiguation)
- Ron Cummings, Canadian litigator
- Roy Thomas Cummings (1930–1976), Canadian politician
- Ruth Cummings (1894–1984), American screenwriter

=== S ===
- Samuel Cummings (1927–1998), American arms dealer
- Samuel Ray Cummings (born 1944), American judge
- Scott Cummings (disambiguation)
- Seán Cummings (born 1968), Canadian playwright
- Shane Jiraiya Cummings (born 1974), Australian author
- Shannon Cummings (born 1971), known professionally as Tiffany Mynx, American pornographic actress
- Shaun Cummings (born 1989), English footballer
- Stephanie Cummings, American politician
- Stephen Cummings (born 1954), Australian singer-songwriter
- Steve Cummings (born 1981), English cyclist
- Steven Cummings (disambiguation)
- Stuart Cummings (born 1960), English rugby union referee
- Susan Cummings (disambiguation)
- Sydney Cummings (born 1999), American-Guyanese footballer

=== T ===
- Taylor Cummings (born 1994), American lacrosse player
- Terry Cummings (born 1961), American basketball player
- Terry Cummings (politician), American politician
- Theodore E. Cummings (1907–1982), American ambassador
- Thomas Cummings (disambiguation)
- Tim Cummings (born 1973), American actor
- T. J. Cummings (born 1981), American basketball player
- Tommy Cummings (1928–2009), English footballer
- Tony Cummings, American magazine editor
- Travis Cummings (born 1972), American politician
- Trent Cummings (born 1973), Australian footballer

=== V ===
- Vera Cummings (1891–1940), New Zealand artist
- Veronica Cummings (born 1973), American swimmer
- Vicki Cummings (1914–1969), American musical comedy actress
- Vicki Cummings (archaeologist), British prehistoric archaeologist
- Vonteego Cummings (born 1976), American basketball player

=== W ===
- Walter J. Cummings Jr. (1916–1999), American politician
- Warren Cummings (born 1980), Scottish footballer
- Whitney Cummings (born 1982), American comedian
- William Cummings (disambiguation)

=== Z ===
- Zak Cummings (born 1984), American mixed martial artist

== See also ==
- Judge Cummings (disambiguation)
- Senator Cummings (disambiguation)
- Cumings (surname)
- Cumming (surname)
- Cummins (surname)
