= Cummins (surname) =

Cummins is a surname.

As an Irish surname, it is anglicised from Irish Gaelic surname Ó Comáin

Notable people with the surname include:

- Albert Baird Cummins (1850–1926), U.S. political figure
- Alva M. Cummins (1869–1946), American lawyer
- Anderson Cummins (born 1966), Canadian international cricketer
- Andrew J. Cummins (1868–1923), U.S. Medal of Honor recipient
- Brendan Cummins (Tipperary hurler) (born 1975), Irish hurling player
- Christopher C. Cummins, an American chemist currently the Henry Dreyfus Professor at Massachusetts Institute of Technology
- Clessie Cummins (1888–1968), U.S. founder of Cummins Engine Co.
- Diane Cummins (born 1974), Canadian athlete
- Francis Cummins (born 1976), English rugby league player
- Frank Cummins (disambiguation)
- George Baker Cummins (1904–2007), American mycologist
- George David Cummins (1822–1876), American bishop and founder of the Reformed Episcopal Church
- Gordon Cummins (1914–1942), English murderer
- Harold Cummins (1893–1976), father of Dermatoglyphics
- Hugh Gordon Cummins (1891–1970), Barbadian politician
- Ida L. Cummins (1853–1918), American women's rights and children's rights activist
- J. David Cummins, American economist
- James Cummins (disambiguation)
- Jeanine Cummins, American author
- Jim Cummins (professor), Canadian academic
- Jim Cummins (ice hockey) (born 1970), retired professional U.S. ice hockey player
- Joel Cummins, American musician
- John Cummins, a number of people including:
  - John Cummins (union organiser) (1948–2006), Australian
  - John Cummins (Canadian politician) (1942–2025), Canadian politician
  - John Adams Cummins (1835–1913), Hawaiian businessman and politician
  - John Stephen Cummins (1928–2024), American prelate of the Roman Catholic Church
- Jonathan Cummins, Canadian musician and record producer
- Judith Cummins, British Labour Party politician, Member of Parliament (MP) for Bradford South since May 2015
- Kenneth Cummins, British veteran of the First World War
- Light Townsend Cummins, educator and historian
- Maria Susanna Cummins (1827–1866), American author
- Martin Cummins, Canadian actor
- Mary S. Cummins, American educator
- Maurice Cummins, Irish politician
- Micky Cummins (born 1978), Irish association football (soccer) player
- Miguel Cummins (born 1990), Barbadian cricketer
- Nick Cummins (born 1987), Australian rugby union player
- Pat Cummins (born 1993), Australian international cricketer
- Patrick Cummins (fighter) (born 1980), American mixed martial artist
- Patrick Cummins (politician) (1921–2009), Irish politician
- Patrick Cummins (piper), Irish piper and tutor
- Paul Cummins, English ceramic artist
- Paul Cummins (basketball) (born 1984), Irish basketball player
- Peggy Cummins (1925–2017), British actress
- Ray Cummins, Irish player of hurling and Gaelic Football
- Ryan Cummins, English cricketer
- Talitha Cummins, Australian journalist
- William Cummins (rugby union), Wales international rugby union player
- William Cummins (Irish politician)
- William Patrick Cummins, Australian politician

== See also ==
- Cummings (surname)
- Commins (surname)
