= John K. Beatty =

Irish uilleann piper

John K. Beatty (born c. 1821), Irish uilleann piper.

A native of Drumrany, Ballymore, County Westmeath, Beatty emigrated to the US in 1839, landing in Brooklyn, New York, where he worked as a bricklayer. By 1860 he had moved to Chicago and was a member of the Illinois militia, being "actively engaged in the commissary department" upon the outbreak of the American Civil War.

"About this time Mr. Beatty commenced his musical studies under the instruction of the veteran piper James Quinn ... A good set of Egan pipes which he owned were laid aside after Billy Taylor of Philadelphia had developed a more powerful instrument. ... With the first returns from a lucrative position, a carte blanche order for a new set of pipes was given Mr. Taylor, and it was on this triumph of the great pipermaker’s art that John K. Beatty so distinguished himself. ... So supreme was he at lilting that on hearing him vocalize a tune in that way, the renowned Taylor said: "Ah, Mr. Beatty, if you could only play it that way you’d be a wonder." But he cou1dn’t. Neither could anyone else, for such rhythmic staccato was beyond their powers of execution."

"Mr. Beatty’s headlong execution on his superb set of pipes was as much of a surprise to Tarlach Mac Suibhne, the "Donegal Piper," as was his lilting. After watching his acrobatic performance on the huge instrument for a time, McSweeney remarked quizzically: "Begor, Mr. Beatty, you have a great shower of fingers." And so he had."

"In the exuberance of his spirits and anxiety to impress his audience with a due sense of his superlative execution, he not infrequently left much to be desired in the way of rhythmic precision, it must be confessed; and if the drones and regulators after a round or two of such strenuosity insisted on disagreeing with the chanter, it must not be regarded as a reflection on the maker, or the conduct of the instrument under milder treatment."

"Like a true bard he composed and sang his own songs, mainly on topical subjects, and had his practice on the pipes been commenced in his youth instead of his manhood, the true spirit of the minstrel so dominant in his character would doubtless have gained him more enduring fame."

By the time Captain O'Neill published his book in 1913, Beatty had grown "enfeebled by age and no longer able to play in the manner described."

== See also ==
- John O’ Gorman
- Denis Delaney
- Patsy Touhey
- Professor John Cummings
