= George Cummings (disambiguation) =

George Cummings (1938–2024) was an American guitarist and songwriter.

George Cummings may also refer to:

- George Cummings (cricketer) (1882–1943), New Zealand cricketer
- George Cummings (footballer) (1913–1987), Scottish footballer
- George Bain Cummings (1890–1974), American architect
- George Gordon Cummings, aka George Gordon (1818–1869), British-American developer and industrialist in early San Francisco

== See also ==
- George Cumming (golfer) (1879–1950), Scottish-Canadian golfer and club maker
- George Cumming (politician) (1752–1834), Scottish politician
- George Cummins (disambiguation), multiple people
