= Ali Shilatifard =

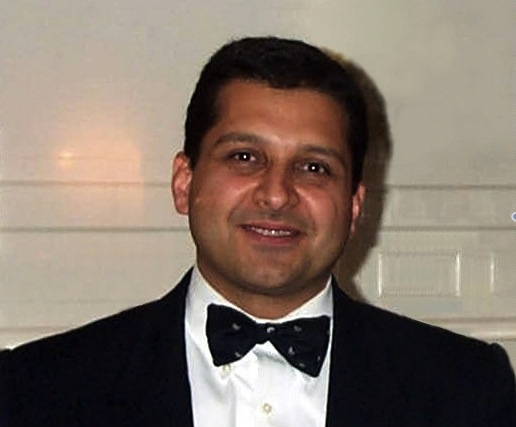
- Citizenship: USA
- Education: University of Georgia, Athens; University of Oklahoma College of Medicine; Kennesaw State University
- Known for: Role of transcription elongation control and epigenetics in gene expression and human diseases
- Spouse: Laura Shilatifard
- Children: 4
- Awards: Elected member of the American Academy of Arts & Sciences (AAA&S) Elected Fellow of the American Association for the Advancement of Science (AAAS) ASBMB-AMGEN Award Elected member of the National Academy of Sciences Elected member of the National Academy of Medicine
- Scientific career
- Fields: Biochemistry/Molecular Genetics
- Workplaces: Northwestern University Feinberg School of Medicine, St. Louis University School of Medicine

Ali Shilatifard is an American biochemist, molecular geneticist is an elected fellow of the American Association for the Advancement of Science (AAAS), elected member of American Academy of Arts & Sciences (AAA&S), elected member of the National Academy of Sciences and elected member of the National Academy of Medicine. He is the Robert Francis Furchgott Professor and chairman of the department of biochemistry and molecular genetics, and the director of the Simpson Query Institute for Epigenetics at the Northwestern University Feinberg School of Medicine. He has served as a member of the Senior Editorial Board for the journal Science. He also served as the founding Deputy Editor and the first academic Editor for Science's open access journal Science Advances between 2014 and 2023. During his tenure as the editor of Science Advances, the journal brought onboard roughly 50 deputy editors and over 350 associate editors managing over 22,000 annual submissions and roughly 2,000 annual publications, reaching an impact factor of 14.98. He has served on the Scientific Advisory Board (SAB) of Keystone Symposia, Max Planck Society, and Genentech and is a member of the jury and the Chairman of the committee for the BBVA Foundation Prize in Medicine.

Research in Shilatifard's lab focuses on the cause of childhood leukemia through chromosomal translocations, the role of ELL in this process, and the discovery of the Super Elongation Complex as being a central complex linking MLL translocations into a diverse number of genes to leukemic pathogenesis.

== Biography ==
Shilatifard has said he developed his love of science as a young boy working with and observing his grandfather, a physician/scientist and professor of medicine of the University of Tehran. Shilatifard moved to the United States in 1984 where he began his study of organic chemistry at Kennesaw State University in Georgia. He began to work on his doctoral degree in biochemistry at the University of Georgia, Athens. Shilatifard completed his Ph.D. from the University of Oklahoma where his mentor, Dr. Richard Cummings, had moved his program. As a Jane Coffin Childs Postdoctoral Fellow at the Oklahoma Medical Research Foundation, Shilatifard identified the first function of any of the MLL translocation partners found in leukemia and proposed that transcriptional elongation control is central to leukemia pathogenesis. Shilatifard began his independent lab in the Edward A. Doisy Department of Biochemistry and Molecular Biology at the St. Louis University School of Medicine, where he identified the first histone H3 lysine 4 (H3K4) methylase in Saccharomyces cerevisiae: which he named Set1/COMPASS; and defined the pathway of histone H3K4 methylation which is highly conserved from yeast to human. Studies from Shilatifard's laboratory linking epigenetic factors and transcription elongation control to malignancies have provided therapeutic approaches for the treatment of these cancers. He also served on the Life Sciences jury for the Infosys Prize in 2017. On April 12, 2019, Shilatifard presented "Childhood Leukemia: On the Edge of Extinction!" at TEDxUofIChicago.
