= Patrick Cummins =

Patrick Cummins may refer to:

- Pat Cummins (born 1993), Australian international cricketer
- Patrick Cummins (fighter) (born 1980), American mixed martial artist
- Patrick Cummins (politician) (1921–2009), Irish politician
- Patrick Cummins (piper), Irish piper and tutor

== See also ==
- Pat Cummings (disambiguation)
