= Frank Cummins =

Frank Cummins may refer to:

- Frank Cummins (Kilkenny hurler) (born 1947), Irish hurler for Kilkenny
- Frank Cummins (Dublin hurler) (1925–1967), Irish hurler for Dublin
- Frank Cummins (cricketer) (1906–1966), Australian cricketer
- Frank Cummins (footballer) (1896–1971), Australian rules footballer

== See also ==
- Francis Cummins (born 1976), English rugby league coach and former player
- Frank Cummings (1891–1954), Australian Olympic rower
