= John Beatty =

John Beatty may refer to:

- John Beatty (New Jersey politician) (1749–1826), American Revolutionary War officer, delegate to Continental Congress, New Jersey congressman
- John Beatty (Ohio politician) (1828–1914), U.S. congressman, Civil War Union general
- John Beatty (philosopher) (born 1951), University of British Columbia philosopher of biology
- John Beatty (illustrator) (born 1961), American comics illustrator
- John Lee Beatty, American scenic designer
- J. W. Beatty (John William Beatty, 1869–1941), Canadian painter
- John Louis Beatty (1922–1975), American writer and professor
- John K. Beatty (c. 1821–?), Irish uilleann piper
- John Beatty Jr.,, American stock car racing driver

== See also ==
- John Beattie (disambiguation)
