= John Cumming =

John Cumming may refer to:

- John Cumming (clergyman) (1807–1881), Scottish clergyman
- John Cumming (Scottish footballer) (1930–2008), Scottish footballer who played for Heart of Midlothian and Scotland
- John Cumming (Australian footballer) (born 1952), Australian footballer for Melbourne

== See also ==
- John Cummins (disambiguation)
- John Cummings (disambiguation)
