= Colin Carlson =

American child prodigy (born 1996)

Colin Carlson (born 1996) is a former child prodigy who won the Harry S. Truman Scholarship at 14, making national headlines.

He is the lead author of the report “Parasite biodiversity faces extinction and redistribution in a changing climate,” which proposes in the journal Science Advances that about a third of all parasite species could go extinct by 2070 due to climate change. This is of concern because the loss of lice, fleas, and worms could breed new parasites with devastating health results, he says in a video interview with Democracy Now!

At age 13 he sued the University of Connecticut for age discrimination, as he was not able to take a course requiring field study abroad in Africa. The New York Times reported that his case "underscores a larger point, the struggle of the many gifted youngsters in this country who try to maneuver in a system that largely ignores them and, at worst, results in situations when many children with great potential flounder because they are not challenged enough." He began working as a postdoctoral fellow at SESYNC in 2018, and has done work on the implications of climate engineering and the spread of disease by mosquitoes due to global warming. He is currently an Assistant Research Professor at the Center for Global Health Science & Security at Georgetown University.
