= Jim Cummins =

Jim Cummins may refer to:

- Jim Cummins (photographer) (born 1944), American photographer
- Jim Cummins (reporter) (1945–2007), American television reporter
- Jim Cummins (ice hockey) (born 1970), professional ice hockey player
- Jim Cummins (professor), instructor at the University of Toronto

== See also ==
- James Cummins (disambiguation)
- James Cummings (disambiguation)
- Jim Cummings (born 1952), American voice actor and singer
