= William Cummins =

William Cummins may refer to:

- William Cummins (rugby union)
- William Cummins (Irish politician)
- William Patrick Cummins, Australian politician

== See also ==
- William Cummings (disambiguation)
