= John Cummings =

John Cummings may refer to:

- John Cummings (Massachusetts banker) (1812–1898), American politician and bank president from Massachusetts
- John Cummings (piper) (1828–post–1913), Irish piper from Athenry
- Jack Cummings (director) (1900–1989), MGM producer
- Jack Cummings (tennis) (1901–1972), Australian player of the 1920s
- Jack Cummings (baseball) (1904–1962), American baseball player
- John Cummings (politician) (1943–2017), English Labour Party Member of Parliament
- John Cummings (footballer) (born 1944), Scottish football player
- Johnny Ramone (John William Cummings, 1948–2004), American guitarist of the rock group The Ramones
- John Cummings (musician), Scottish guitarist of the band Mogwai
- John Cummings (baseball) (born 1969), American Major League Baseball pitcher
- John A. Cummings (1838–1887), mayor of Somerville, Massachusetts
- John W. Cummings (1855–1929), American lawyer and politician in Massachusetts

== See also ==
- Jack Cummings (disambiguation)
- John Cummins (disambiguation)
- John Commins (disambiguation)
- John Cumming (disambiguation)
