= Joe Cummings =

Joe Cummings may refer to:

- Joe Cummings (travel writer) (born 1952), American travel writer
- Joe Cummings (poet) (born 1964), Canadian poet
- Joe Cummings (American football) (born 1974), American football linebacker

== See also ==
- Joseph Cummings (1817–1890), American university president
- Jo Cummings (Joseph Theodore Cummings, born 1998), English footballer
