= James Cummins =

James Cummins may refer to:

- James Cummins (poet), American poet
- James Turner Cummins (1842–1912), British military officer in the Indian Army
- James Robert Cummins (1847–1929), American criminal
- James (Jack) Cummins (1773–1849), Texas farmer, public official and colonist

== See also ==
- Jim Cummins (disambiguation)
- James Cummings (disambiguation)
- Cummins (surname)
