= Jack Beattie (disambiguation) =

Jack Beattie may refer to:

- Jack Beattie (ice hockey) (1906–1981), English ice hockey player
- Jack Beattie (1886–1960), Northern Irish politician
- Jack Beattie (footballer) (1912–1992), Scottish footballer

== See also ==
- John Beattie (disambiguation)
