= Edward Cummings =

Edward Cummings may refer to:

- E. E. Cummings (Edward Estlin Cummings, 1894–1962), American poet, author and painter
- Edward Cummings (minister) (1861–1926), American minister and sociologist, father of E. E. Cummings
- Ed Cummings (American football) (1941–2020), American football linebacker
- Bernie S (born Edward Cummings), computer hacker

== See also ==
- Edward Cummins (1886–1926), American golfer
