= Robert Cummings (disambiguation) =

Robert Cummings (1910–1990) was an American film and television actor.

Bobby or Robert Cummings may also refer to:

== Sportsmen ==
- Robert Cummings (rowing) (1899–1969), Australian champion coxswain at 1924 Summer Olympics
- Bobby Cummings (1935–2008), English footballer who played as centre forward or outside right
- Robert Cummings (footballer) (born 1969), Australian rules footballer
- Terry Cummings (Robert Terrell Cummings, born 1961), American basketball player
- T. J. Cummings (Robert Tyrell Cummings Jr., born 1981), his son, American basketball player

== Others ==
- Robert Cummings (actor, born 1865) (1865–1949), American stage and film actor
- Robert Cummings (politician) (1833–1910), Canadian manufacturer and community leader
- Robert Cummings Neville (born 1939), American systematic philosopher and theologian
- Robert Bartleh Cummings (born 1965), American singer, songwriter, filmmaker and voice actor, legal name Rob Zombie

== See also ==
- Robert Cumming (disambiguation)
