= Damon Cummings =

Damon Cummings may refer to:

- Damon M. Cummings (1910-1942), a United States Navy officer and Navy Cross recipient
- USS Damon Cummings (DE-756), a United States Navy destroyer escort cancelled in 1943
- USS Damon M. Cummings (DE-643), a United States Navy destroyer escort in commission from 1944 to 1947
