= George Cummins =

George Cummins may refer to:

- George Cummins (priest) (died 1872), Archdeacon of Trinidad
- George Cummins (footballer) (1931–2009), Irish footballer
- George Cummins (United Irishmen) (1770–1830), member of the Society of the United Irishmen
- George Cummins (rugby league) (1886–1953), Australian rugby league player
- George Baker Cummins (1904–2007), American mycologist
- George David Cummins (1822–1876), American Anglican bishop

== See also ==
- George Cummings (1938–2024), American guitarist and songwriter
- George Cummings (footballer) (1913–1987), Scottish footballer
- George Cummings (cricketer) (1882–1943), New Zealand cricketer
