= James Cuming =

James Cuming may refer to:

- James Cuming (chemist, born 1835) (1835–1911), Australian chemist
- James Cuming Jr. (1861–1920), Australian chemist, son of James Cuming

== See also ==
- James Cumming (disambiguation)
- James Cummings (disambiguation)
