= John Commins =

John Commins may refer to:

- John Commins (cricketer, born 1941) (1941–2013), South African cricketer
- John Commins (cricketer, born 1965) (born 1965), former South African cricketer
- John Commins (hurler) (born 1966), former Irish hurler

== See also ==
- John Cummins (disambiguation)
- John Cummings (disambiguation)
