= John Beattie =

John Beattie may refer to:

- John Beattie (Australian politician) (1932–2020), Tasmanian politician
- John Beattie (musician), Irish musician
- John Beattie (footballer) (1912–1992), Scottish professional association footballer
- John Beattie (rower) (born 1957), who represented Great Britain at the 1980 Summer Olympics
- Jock Beattie (1907–1977), Scotland international rugby union player
- John Beattie (rugby union) (born 1957), former Scottish international rugby player and commentator
- Johnnie Beattie (born 1985), Scottish international rugby player, son of the above John Beattie
- Sir John Carruthers Beattie (1866–1946), first principal and vice chancellor of the University of Cape Town from 1918 to 1937
- J. M. Beattie (John Maurice Beattie, 1932–2017), British legal historian
- John Watt Beattie (1859–1930), Australian photographer and fellow of the Royal Society of Tasmania
- Johnny Beattie (1927–2020), Scottish actor and comedian
- William John Beattie (1941/2—2025), known as John Beattie, leader of the Canadian Nazi Party in the 1960s

== See also ==
- John Beatty (disambiguation)
- Jack Beattie (disambiguation)
