= William Cumming =

William Cumming may refer to:

- William Cumming (Continental Congress) (1724–1797), American lawyer, Continental Congressman for North Carolina
- William Cumming (colonel) (1786–1863), American soldier and planter from Augusta, Georgia
- William Skeoch Cumming (1864–1929), Scottish watercolourist
- William Cumming (politician) (1886–1951), Australian politician
- William Cumming (artist) (1917–2010), American artist

== See also ==
- William Cumming Henley (1860–1919), English collector and scientist
- William Cuming (1769–1852), Irish painter
- William Cummings (disambiguation)
