= Judge Cummings =

Judge Cummings may refer to:

- Jeffrey Cummings (born 1962), judge of the United States District Court for the Northern District of Illinois
- Samuel Ray Cummings (born 1944), judge of the United States District Court for the Northern District of Texas
- Walter J. Cummings Jr. (1916–1999), judge of the United States Court of Appeals for the Seventh Circuit
