= Susan Cummings =

Susan Cummings may refer to:

- Susan Cummings (heiress) (born 1962), American heiress
- Susan Cummings (actress) (1930–2016), German-born US film and television actress
