= Steven Cummings (disambiguation) =

Steven Cummings is an American comic book artist.

Steven Cummings is also the name of:

- Steve Cummings (born 1981), British cyclist
- Steven Cummings (footballer), Australian rules footballer
- Steve Cummings (baseball) (born 1964), former American professional baseball player
- Stephen Cummings (born 1954), 1980s Australian pop music artist and author
- Steven R. Cummings, American epidemiologist

== See also ==
- Steve Cummins
