= Jane Catherine Cummins =

Canadian artist

Jane Catherine Cummins (ca 1841 – January 20, 1893) was a Canadian artist.

Thought to be the daughter of Captain John Swete Cummins and Catherine Smith, she was born on Amherst Island near Kingston. Cummins studied art in Montreal with Otto Reinhold Jacobi. Her work was included in the Dominion Exhibition Sherbrooke in 1886 and in the Montreal Art Association show in 1891. During the last two years of her life, she travelled to Paris, Rome, London and Munich, where she died in 1893.

Her work is included in the collection of the National Gallery of Canada.
