= Nathan Cummings Foundation =

Coordinates: 40°45′22″N 73°59′54″W

The Nathan Cummings Foundation
- Founded: 1949; 77 years ago
- Founder: Nathan Cummings
- Type: Non-operating private foundation (IRS exemption status): 501(c)(3)
- Purpose: Inequality, climate change
- Location(s): 475 Tenth Avenue; New York, NY
- Method: Donations and grants
- Key people: Sharon Alpert, President & CEO
- Revenue: $16.2 million (2024)
- Expenses: $30.9 million (2024)
- Endowment: US$483 million

The Nathan Cummings Foundation was endowed by Nathan Cummings (1896–1985), founder of Consolidated Foods, later renamed Sara Lee. Cummings was also a prominent art collector and supporter of Jewish causes.

In his lifetime, Cummings made contributions to hospitals, universities, and the arts. His endowment created the Nathan Cummings Arts Center at Stanford University and the Joanne and Nathan Cummings Art Center at Connecticut College in New London. He made major contributions to the National Gallery of Art in Washington DC, to the Metropolitan Museum of Art, New York, and to the Art Institute of Chicago. The foundation received most of his estate (then estimated at $500 million) upon his death in 1985.

== Shareholder activism ==
The Nathan Cummings Foundation is one of eight institutional investors represented by the Shareholder Rights Projects, which worked to present shareholder declassification proposals in S&P 500 annual meetings.

The foundation supports organizations active in the areas of environmental justice, climate justice, economic justice, and racial justice. As of July 2024, the foundation’s portfolio was 90% impact, with 10% of assets in neutral positions (such as cash).
