= Richard Cummings =

Richard Cummings may refer to:

- Richard Cummings (actor) (1858–1938), American silent film actor
- Richard Cummings Jr., American TV actor
- Richard D. Cummings, American biochemist
