= Robert Cumming =

Robert Cumming may refer to:

- Robert Cumming (artist) (1943–2021), American painter, sculptor, photographer, and printmaker
- Robert Cumming (art historian) (born 1945), professor of the history of art at Boston University
- Robert Denoon Cumming (1916–2004), Canadian-American philosopher and historian of philosophy

== See also ==
- Robert Cummings (disambiguation)
