= James Cumming =

James Cumming may refer to:

- James Cumming (chemist) (1777–1861), professor of chemistry at the University of Cambridge
- James Cumming (architect), architect of the Norwood Baptist Church (1869) in Adelaide, South Australia
- James Cumming (New Zealand politician) (1879–1971), member of the New Zealand Legislative Council
- James Cumming (footballer) (1891–?), Scottish footballer
- James Cumming (artist) (1922–1991), Scottish painter and lecturer
- James Cumming (Canadian politician) (born 1961), MP
- James Cumming (Royal Navy officer), British Royal Navy admiral

== See also ==
- James Cuming (disambiguation)
- James Cummings (disambiguation)
