= Jack Cummings =

Jack Cummings may refer to:

- Jack Cummings (director) (1900–1989), American film producer and director
- Jack Cummings (tennis) (1901–1972), Australian tennis player
- Jack Cummings (baseball) (1904–1962), Major League Baseball player

== See also ==
- John Cummings (disambiguation)
