= Gun Country =

2023 book

Gun Country: Gun Capitalism, Culture, and Control in Cold War America
- Author: Andrew C. McKevitt
- Subject: American history, gun culture
- Genre: Nonfiction
- Publisher: University of North Carolina Press
- Publication date: November 14, 2023
- Publication place: United States
- Pages: 320
- ISBN: 9781469677248
- OCLC: 1375538850

Gun Country: Gun Capitalism, Culture, and Control in Cold War America is a 2023 nonfiction book about American gun culture by Andrew C. McKevitt. It covers the development of Samuel Cummings's firearms import business, Interarms.
