= Joan Cummings =

Joan Cummings may refer to:

- Joan Cummings, a character from the US soap Sunset Beach played by Carol Potter (see List of Sunset Beach characters)
- Joan Cummings, a reporter on BBC Midlands Today
