= Nathan Cummings =

Canadian-American businessman (1896–1985)

- Born: Nathan Komiensky; 14 October 1896; Saint John, New Brunswick, Canada
- Died: 19 February 1985 (aged 88); Palm Beach, Florida, U.S.
- Occupation: Businessman
- Known for: Founder of Consolidated Foods
- Spouses: Ruth Lillian Kellert (m. 1919; died 1952) Joanne Ruth Toor (m. 1959; div. 1976)

Nathan Cummings (born Komiensky; 14 October 1896 – 19 February 1985) was a Jewish-Canadian-American businessman, investor and philanthropist. He was the founder of Consolidated Foods, which later became known by one of its product lines, Sara Lee Corporation.

== Early life ==
Nathan Komiensky was born on 14 October 1896 in Saint John, New Brunswick, to David Louis Komiensky (1872–1940) and Elizabeth Beatrice "Bessie" Howe (1868–1900). David Komiensky was born in Minsk, then part of the Russian Empire, and in 1892 left the country to escape the oppressive May Laws that had been enacted following the assassination of Czar Alexander II. Earlier, David's brother Isaac had immigrated to Saint John. Allegedly, Isaac had intended to go to New York but accidentally got off in New Brunswick. Upon leaving Russia, David joined Isaac in Canada. Shortly after arriving in Saint John, David met Bessie Howe, who had recently come to Canada from Lithuania, and soon married.

Following Nathan's birth, David and Bessie had a second son, Maxwell Komiensky (Maxwell Cummings), who was born on 19 April 1898. Bessie became ill after the birth and on 4 February 1900 died at age 32. David soon remarried to Esther Miriam Saxe (1882–1966). David and Esther had five more children: Minnie (1903–1999), Benjamin (1904–1999), Ralph (1906–1970), Pauline (1911–1917), and Harold (1918–1998).

In 1905 the Komienskys moved to Waltham, Massachusetts, setting up a small shoe shop. That same year the family changed its name from Komiensky to Cummings. In 1910 they relocated again to Manchester, New Hampshire. During this time, Nathan enrolled in a dry goods economist training school in New York City and lived in Williamsburg, Brooklyn. In 1911, David moved the family back to Canada and settled in Montreal, while Nathan remained in New York. Shortly thereafter Nathan rejoined his family in Montreal. From the age of fifteen he sold shoes until, at nineteen, he took on the job of traveling salesman for a shoe manufacturer.

== Business career ==
Cummings had established a shoe shop and factory of his own by 1924, but the business foundered during the Depression, and he was forced to declare bankruptcy in 1932. He paid off his debts and started anew.

By the mid-1930s he had invested in McCormicks, a biscuit and candy company in Canada. The success of that business, which he sold to Weston in 1939, prompted an invitation to manage the Baltimore-based coffee, tea and sugar chain, C.D. Kenny Company. Cummings acquired the company in 1941. Its continued prosperity allowed him to expand his holdings to found a business empire.

Over the next decade, Cummings invested within company after company. In 1945 he established his corporate headquarters in Chicago and formed the Consolidated Grocers Corporation as a holding company. Time proclaimed him the "Duke of Groceries."

In 1954 the company name was changed to Consolidated Foods Corporation, which Cummings thought was 'less old-fashioned', and in 1985 the name Sara Lee Corporation was adopted. Sara Lee was the name of one of the company's best known brands, which Cummings had acquired in 1956.

Cummings retired from the company in 1968, but remained honorary chairman and active in company affairs until his death in 1985.

== Marriage/Family ==
Cummings' first wife was Ruth Lillian Kellert, whom he married in 1919. She died in 1952. In 1959, he wed Joanne Toor; the marriage ended in divorce in 1976. Upon his death in 1985, Cummings was survived by three children from his first marriage, Beatrice Cummings Mayer of Chicago [1921-2018], Herbert Cummings of Paradise Valley, Ariz., and Alan H. Cummings of Palm Beach; a sister, Minnie Cummings Abbey and four brothers, Maxwell, Benjamin, Ralph, and Harold, all of Montreal, and nine grandchildren. Cummings was related to MGM's legendary studio boss Louis B. Mayer through marriage. Louis B. Mayer's older sister Ida was married to Louis Komiensky, brother to Nate's father, David Komiensky.

In 1992, a history of the Cummings family entitled David and Bessie Komiensky, Jewish Lithuanian Immigrants: A Brief Family History, was commissioned by friends as a surprise gift for Herbert Kellert Cummings, and published by Brigham Young University in Provo, Utah.

== Art collector ==
As Cummings became increasingly affluent, he began to collect art. His first significant acquisition was made in Paris in 1945, immediately after World War II, when he purchased Camille Pissarro's Bountiful Harvest 1893, which he noticed in the window of an art dealer. He knew nothing of Pissarro, but he was confident in what he liked.

There was little in Nathan Cummings' background to suggest an affinity with art. Later in his life he liked to tell of his first tentative encounter with art: "An advertising man convinced me that I should have a painting made of the view from my window." Cummings liked it so much that he asked the artist to paint the scene a second time - the view at night. His satisfaction with these works sparked an interest in collecting art that was to develop with the passion of the newly converted.

Cummings' collections were diverse, including French Impressionist paintings, modern sculpture, ancient Peruvian ceramics, and works of living artists such as Henry Moore, Pablo Picasso, Marc Chagall, Georges Braque, Giacomo Manzù and Alberto Giacometti, who became members of his social circle. He enjoyed friendships with other celebrities, including Duke and Duchess of Windsor and Bob Hope, a good friend who emerged from a giant cake at Cummings's eightieth birthday.

As a collector, Cummings did not confine himself to the acquisition of blue-chip impressionist and 20th-century master paintings. He enjoyed contemporary art and delighted in new discoveries. He often acquired whole series of works by artists he liked, later distributing the works to friends or scattering them around the workplace. At one time he owned a fishing fleet and ensured that each of the fifteen boats was equipped with its own work of art. He bought and sold without expecting to keep the works forever, allowing old favorites to be replaced by new enthusiasms. Cummings expected that everyone would share his passion for art: as well as giving away works of art as presents, he displayed parts of his collection in the offices of his companies for the enjoyment of the staff.

== Philanthropy ==
Starting in the 1950s Cummings became a major donor to hospitals, universities, arts organizations, and Jewish causes. His endowment created the Nathan Cummings Art Building at Stanford University, and the Joanne and Nathan Cummings Art Center at Connecticut College in New London. (Joanne Toor Cummings was the second wife of Cummings; she died in 1995.) He made major contributions to the National Gallery of Art in Washington DC, to the Metropolitan Museum of Art, New York, and to the Art Institute of Chicago. In 1949 he established the Nathan Cummings Foundation, which received most of his estate (then estimated at $200 million) upon his death. The foundation funds initiatives to build a socially and economically just society.
