= Ron Cummings =

- Born: Ronald G. Cummings; Edmonton, Alberta, Canada
- Education: University of Alberta
- Occupation: Lawyer
- Years active: 1960-2009
- Website: CAM LLP bio

Ron Cummings is a Canadian retired litigator who was a major figure in Canadian law. He argued two of three cases before the Supreme Court of Canada that would eventually be considered a case law trilogy of personal injury cases for Canada. He also negotiated or litigated some of the largest personal injury awards in Canadian history.

== Early life and education ==
Cummings grew up in the Boyle Street district on the east side of Edmonton in Alberta, Canada. He was raised with his father selling iron and steel products and his mother a bookkeeper for lumber companies. The house he lived in was small and he was forced to share a bedroom with his grandfather. Cummings attended the University of Alberta and worked odd jobs to pay his way through law school.

== Career ==
After graduating from law school in 1960, Cummings began working for a large Edmonton law firm. He worked there for a year prior to moving to a smaller firm and eventually joining his partner firm. Cummings joined the law firm of Cummings Andrews Mackay in 1962. During his time with the firm he turned it from a solicitor office into a litigation firm, handling cases throughout the entire country and earning him the nickname "King of Torts." Cummings also took a stance during his career to not represent insurance companies, instead only representing people who have been disabled by acts of negligence.

Early in his career Cummings also specialized in divorce. He argued a case before the Supreme Court of Canada where the judge awarded his client lump sum alimony based on equity in the other party's residence. It was the first decision of its kind and one that is now studied in law schools throughout Canada.

In 1978, Cummings argued two cases of a trilogy before the Supreme Court of Canada that set precedent for personal injury awards in Canada. He argued Andrews v. Grand & Toy Alberta Ltd. and Thornton v. Prince George School Board with the third being Arnold v Teno. Both cases involved large awards which were challenged by the defense. The result of the rulings was the raising of non-monetary damages that could be awarded in such cases. It also reversed 100 years of case law that determined awards based on a lump sum as opposed to itemized awards for pain and suffering and loss of future earnings.

In the 1980-90s, Cummings litigated personal injury cases that became some of the largest structured settlement cases in Canada. Two such cases were the largest in the history of Alberta Court, with awards of $5 million and $2.9 million. Cummings tried a case in 1998 that resulted in the first ruling to use a pay-equity model. The judge awarded $4 million to the plaintiff calculated based on "the same salary level as a man had she not been injured."

Cummings was nominated for the Order of Canada, the second highest honour for merit in the system of orders, decorations, and medals of Canada. He retired from the firm in 2009 but remained on as a consultant.

== Personal life ==
Cummings lives on a 40-acre estate southeast of Edmonton. He has two children and was married to Virginia Cummings until her death in 2007.
