= John Cummins =

John Cummins may refer to:

- John Cummins (Australian politician) (born 1944), former member of the South Australian House of Assembly
- John Cummins (Canadian politician) (1942–2025), Canadian politician
- John Cummins (Gaelic footballer) (born 1948), Irish Gaelic footballer
- John Cummins (Irish politician) (born 1988), Irish Fine Gael senator since 2020
- John Cummins (union organiser) (1948–2006), Australian labour leader
- John Adams Cummins (1835–1913), Hawaiian politician
- John D. Cummins (1791–1849), U.S. Representative from Ohio
- John Stephen Cummins (1928–2024), American prelate of the Roman Catholic Church
- John Swete Cummins (1811–1862), Irish-born municipal politician and writer in Canada
- John William Cummins, American Speaker of the West Virginia House of Delegates (1929–1931)

== See also ==
- John R. Cummins Farmhouse (built 1879–1880), American National Register of Historic Places
- John Cummings (disambiguation)
- John Commins (disambiguation)
- Jonathan Cummins, Canadian musician
