= John Swete Cummins =

Canadian politician

John Swete Cummins (c. 1811 – 1862) was a municipal politician and writer in 19th-century Canada.

The son of Nicholas Marshall Cummins and Martha Swete, he was born in Cork and came to Canada in November 1836 as an agent of Lord Mount Cashel who owned land in Upper Canada near Delaware and on Amherst Island. Cummins was in charge of a militia company during the Upper Canada Rebellion; he was later put in charge of a militia company on Amherst Island. In 1840, he married Catherine Smith in Ireland. Cummins served as chair of the Midland District council in 1844 and 1845. Between 1855 and 1858, he represented Roxton township on Shefford County council in the Eastern Townships. Cummins was also involved in recruiting settlers to Canada East from Ireland and helping settlers establish themselves in Canada.

His novel Altham: A tale of the sea was published in instalments in Barker's Canadian Monthly Magazine but the magazine ceased publication before the final instalment. The novel was published in full in 1849.

Jane Catherine Cummins, believed to be his daughter, was an artist.
