= Joe Cummings (poet) =

Canadian poet

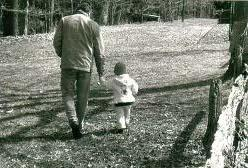
Joe Cummings

Joe Cummings (born Joseph Robert Cummings, September 1, 1964 in Union, Ontario, Canada) is a Canadian poet.

His poetry has been published in Canadian and international publications including, Literary Review of Canada, Adirondack Review and Quills Canadian Poetry Magazine.

His first poetry collection, Threats and Gossip, was published by McArthur & Company Publishing in 2007.

Cummings works at the CBC newsroom as an author and a news narrator.
