= Ed Cummings (American football) =

American football player (1941–2020)

Profile
- Position: Linebacker

Personal information
- Born: June 29, 1941; Anaconda, Montana
- Died: September 25, 2020 (aged 79)

Career information
- High school: Anaconda (Anaconda, Montana)
- College: Stanford
- NFL draft: 1963: undrafted

Career history
- New York Giants (1963)*; New York Jets (1964); Denver Broncos (1965)
- * Offseason or practice squad member only

Awards and highlights
- Third-team All-American (1962); First-team All-Pacific Coast (1962)
- Stats at Pro Football Reference

Edward Arthur Cummings (born June 29, 1941 – September 25, 2020) was an American football linebacker in the American Football League. He played college football at Stanford.

== Collegiate career ==
Cummings was a two-way player for the Stanford Cardinal as a fullback and as a linebacker. He led the Cardinal in tackles in his junior and senior seasons and was named a third-team All-American at fullback as a senior. Cummings was inducted into Stanford's Athletic Hall of Fame in 2005.

== Professional career ==
Cummings was tried out for the New York Giants and was invited to training camp, but was cut before the start of the 1963 season after injuring his shoulder. After being cut he enrolled in the Columbia University School of Social Work and finished his degree in the following offseason. Cummings signed with the New York Jets of the American Football League for the 1964 season after requesting a tryout with the team and became the team's starting linebacker late in the season. Cummings was traded to the Denver Broncos in the offseason and played in all 14 of the team's games in 1965.

== Personal life ==
Cummings son, Joe Cummings, played linebacker in the NFL. Cummings attended The University of Montana School of Law after retiring from football. Cummings died on September 25, 2020.
