= Glen Cummings =

Glen Cummings may refer to:

- Glen Cummings (politician) (born 1944), politician in Manitoba, Canada
- Glen Cummings (musician), American heavy metal guitarist
