= USS Damon M. Cummings =

Buckley-class destroyer escort

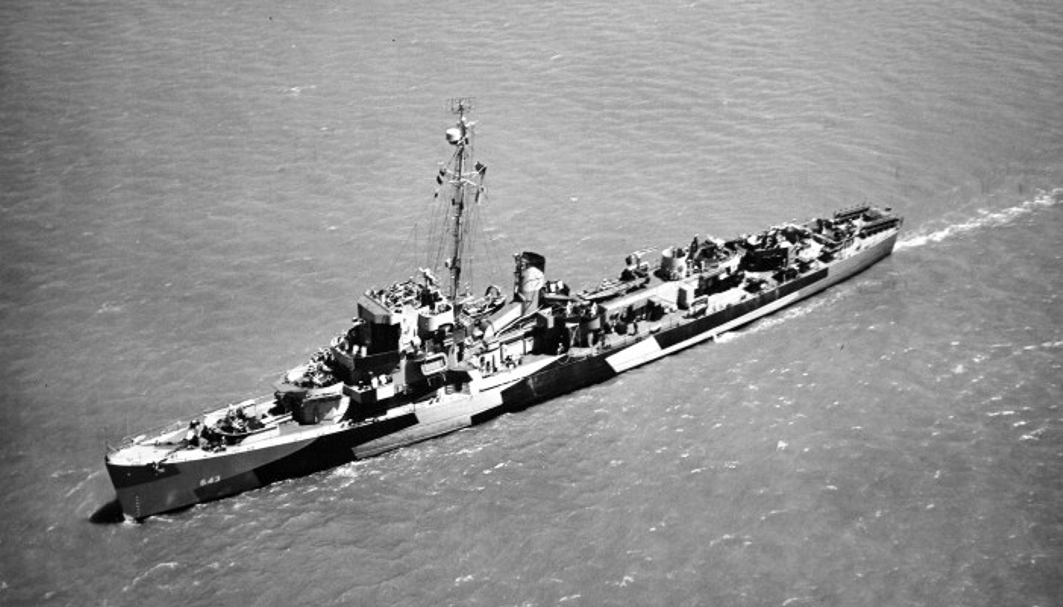

History

United States
- Namesake: Lieutenant Commander Damon M. Cummings (1910-1942), U.S. Navy officer and Navy Cross recipient
- Builder: Bethlehem Steel
- Laid down: 17 October 1943
- Launched: 18 April 1944
- Commissioned: 29 June 1944
- Decommissioned: 3 February 1947
- Stricken: 1 March 1972
- Fate: Sold for scrap, 18 May 1973

General characteristics
- Displacement: 1,740 tons full; 1,400 tons, standard
- Length: 306 ft 0 in (93.27 m)
- Beam: 36 ft 9 in (11.20 m)
- Draft: 13 ft 6 in (4.11 m)
- Propulsion: GE turbo-electric drive, 12,000 shp (8.9 MW); two propellers
- Speed: 24 knots (44 km/h)
- Range: 4,940 nautical miles (9,150 km) at 12 knots (22 km/h)
- Complement: 15 officers, 198 enlisted
- Armament: 3 × 3 in (76 mm) DP guns, 3 × 21 in (53 cm) torpedo tubes, 1 × 1.1 in (28 mm) quad AA gun, 8 × 20 mm cannon, 1 × hedgehog projector, 2 × depth charge tracks, 8 × K-gun depth charge projectors

USS Damon M. Cummings (DE-643) was a Buckley-class destroyer escort in service with the United States Navy from 1944 to 1947. She was scrapped in 1973.

== History ==
Damon M. Cummings was named in honor of Lieutenant Commander Damon M. Cummings (1910–42), who was posthumously awarded the Navy Cross for his heroism on board USS San Francisco during the Naval Battle of Guadalcanal.

Damon M. Cummings was launched on 18 April 1944 by Bethlehem Steel Co., San Francisco, California; sponsored by Mrs. D. M. Cummings; and commissioned on 29 June 1944.

=== Pacific War ===
Clearing San Francisco on 8 September 1944 Damon M. Cummings escorted a convoy to Eniwetok and then sailed on to Port Purvis on Florida Island, in the Solomons, arriving on 15 October. She served in the Solomons until 6 November, and on 19 November she arrived at Funafuti, Ellice Islands, from which she patrolled shipping lanes until 2 January 1945.

Returning to Port Purvis on 18 January 1945, Damon M. Cummings continued escort and patrol duty in the Solomons until 9 March. After repairs to her sound gear at Manus Island, she arrived at Leyte on 19 March to rendezvous with an LST group which she screened to the invasion of Okinawa on 1 April. She remained on patrol off Okinawa until 1 May, then escorted convoys from Ulithi, Saipan, and San Pedro Bay. Leyte, to Okinawa until the end of the war.

Damon M. Cummings remained in the Far East after the war, serving on air-sea rescue stations in the Marianas and visiting Tokyo from 3 to 12 October. On 1 November she cleared Saipan for an overhaul at Bremerton, Washington. She returned to the Western Pacific to provide services to the fleet at Qingdao and Shanghai, China, and off Haiphong and Saigon, Indo-China, between 15 February and 16 September 1946.

=== Decommissioning and fate ===
Damon M. Cummings was placed out of commission in reserve at Long Beach, California (USA) on 3 February 1947. She was stricken from Naval Vessel Register on 1 March 1972 and sold for scrapping on 18 May 1973.

== Awards ==
Damon M. Cummings received one battle star for World War II service.
