= Don Cummings =

American dramatist and author

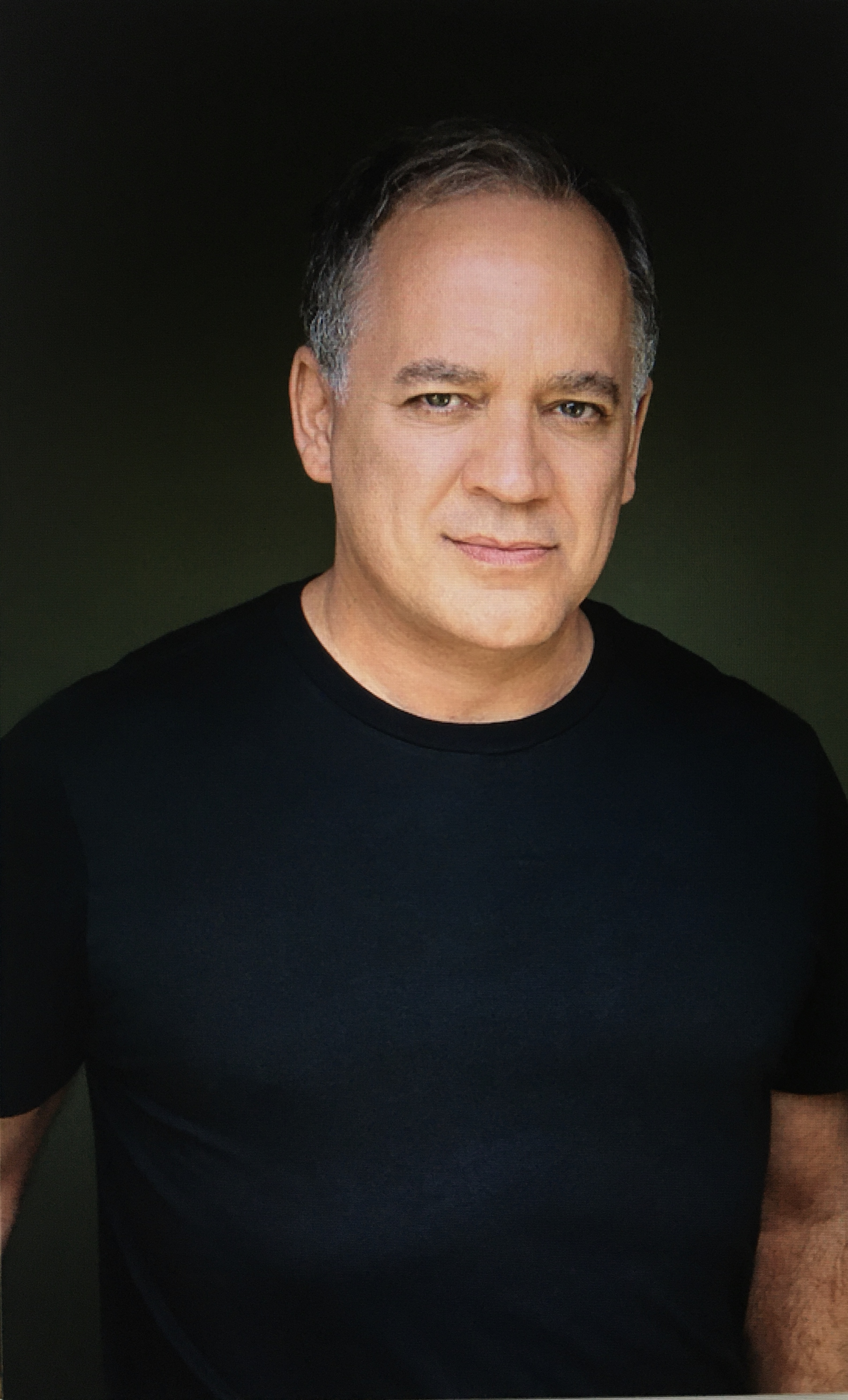
- Cummings in 2019
- Born: Bronxville, New York, US
- Education: Tufts University; Neighborhood Playhouse School of the Theatre
- Spouse: Adam Waring
- Writing career
- Genres: Plays, Films, Memoir

Don Cummings is an American playwright, author, actor, and composer.

== Early life and education ==
Don Cummings was born in Bronxville, New York, and raised in Suffern. After graduating from Tufts University, where he wrote his first play, he took the two-year program of the Neighborhood Playhouse School of the Theatre in New York.

== Career ==
As an actor, Cummings made recurring appearances from 1998 to 2001 on the television series Dharma & Greg as a waiter. His other TV appearances include Mad About You, Lucky, Still Standing, and Half & Half. In film, he had the lead role in the Houston Film Festival winner The Appointment, directed by Todd Wade, and also appeared in Noho, directed by David Schrader. His stage appearances, on both coasts and in regional theaters, included Macbeth in Macbeth, Mr. Bungee in A New Brain, Berenger in Exit the King, Ray in Lone Star, and The Man in Alan Ball's Power Lunch. His one-man show American Air was presented at Theater/Theatre, The HBO Workspace, and The Powerhouse Theatre in Los Angeles, and in part at Soho Repertory Theatre and Ensemble Studio Theatre in New York under the title What Do Men Live By?

Cummings' one-act play Piss Play is About Minorities so It’s Really Important was presented as part of the New York Cringe Festival 2009, where it received the Golden Pineapple for best play. His The Winner, also one act, was produced at West Coast Ensemble and was a finalist for the Heideman Award at Actors Theatre of Louisville; His Live Work Space opened in Los Angeles in 2010.

The Fat of the Land was presented in New York City in 2006 in Ensemble Studio Theatre's Octoberfest directed by Billy Hopkins, featuring Henry Wolfe Gummer, and in Los Angeles by The New Theatre at The Theatre District. It was a finalist for the Kaufman & Hart Prize for New American Comedy awarded by Arkansas Repertory Theatre, and Dan Alemshah received The L.A. Ovation Award for best featured actor in a play for the role of Claudia Vestibule. A Good Smoke, originally produced by The Production Company in Los Angeles, was a semifinalist for the Eugene O'Neill theater conference. It received a reading in 2009 at The Public Theater in New York starring Meryl Streep, Henry Wolfe Gummer, Grace Gummer, Joe Paulik, John Rothman and Debra Monk, directed by Pam MacKinnon, and was optioned for Broadway. Hannah Prichard and Christopher Reiling received Stage Scene LA awards for their performances in Cummings' The Water Tribe in its first performance in Los Angeles in January–February 2020. It is published by Original Works.

Cummings wrote the screenplay for Box, a short film starring Marsha Dietlein Bennett, Lou Liberatore, Dylan Chalfy, Andreas Damm, and Mink Stole that was an official selection in 2013 at The Dam Short Film Festival, the New Film Makers New York Festival, the Twin Rivers Media Festival, and The Toronto Independent film festival. It was picked up for distribution by TVShortsInternational.

As a composer and musician, Cummings was musical director for the 2002 revival of Frank Galati's The Grapes of Wrath at West Coast Ensemble, which received the LA Weekly Award for Best Revival Production. He composed and performed the music for I'm Really Different (Now)! with Karen Kilgariff in Los Angeles.

== Personal life ==
Cummings is married to Adam Waring; they live in Los Angeles. His 2019 memoir, Bent But Not Broken, deals with his experience of Peyronie's disease.

== Works ==
=== Plays ===
- The Water Tribe
- A Good Smoke
- The Fat Of The Land
- The Winner (one act)
- Piss Play Is About Minorities, So It's Really Important (one act)
- American Air (one-man show)
- Stark Raving Mad
- Feed The Children!
- Solid Joints
- Live Work Space
- Exempt
- The Horse Latitudes
- Don't Touch the Orangutan

=== Film scripts ===
- Box (short, 2013)

=== Books ===
Bent But Not Broken, Heliotrope Books, 2019
