= Jim Cummins (photographer) =

American photographer (born 1944)

Jim Cummins (born 1944 in Harlem) is an American photographer known for his work in music (where his work appeared on over 900 album covers), journalism (including for Newsday, the New York Times, Life, Rolling Stone, and Newsweek—where his work earned a National Magazine Award), and sports (where he was a staff photographer for the National Basketball Association).

== Early life ==
Born in 1944 in New York City, Cummins attended New York City's High School of Music & Art and studied art, drawing and painting at the New York City's Museum of Modern Art, at the School of Visual Arts in New York City and at the Art Students League of New York. He served from 1961 through 1965 in the U.S. Marine Corps as a Combat Illustrator before beginning his career in music and sports photojournalism in 1965.

== Photography ==
Cummins began his career as a photojournalist working for Newsweek magazine from 1965 through 1970. He has worked freelance and as a staff photographer for the NBA, Black Enterprise Magazine, New York Times, Newsday , and for the music labels Atlantic Records, Columbia Records, Capitol Records, Mercury Records, Savoy Records, Springboard Records and London Records. He has coauthored four books covering the worlds of sports and music.

== The Music Album Cover years ==
From 1968 to the early 1980s, Cummins worked for Atlantic Records, Columbia Records, Capitol Records, Mercury Records, Savoy Records, Springboard Records and London Records, providing album cover photography for over 900 music album covers.

Among the many music legends of this era who have had one or more of their music album cover photographs shot by Cummins are: Jimi Hendrix, Janis Joplin, Led Zeppelin, Aretha Franklin, B.B. King, Eric Clapton, Buddy Miles, Burt Bacharach, Chuck Berry, Ella Fitzgerald, Duke Ellington, Louis Armstrong, Glen Campbell, Miles Davis, James Brown, Stevie Wonder, The Who, The Temptations, Tina Turner, Vanilla Fudge, Velvet Underground, Wilson Pickett, Rascals, Dusty Springfield, Dr. John, Joe Cocker, Sam & Dave, Nancy Wilson, Roberta Flack, John Sebastian, Jimmy Page and Sly and The Family Stone.

== Books and Teaching ==
Cummins has co-authored and been the photographer for several books including Led Zeppelin II, Led Zeppelin: Good Times, Bad Times, Courtside – The Fans Guide To Pro Basketball and Jimi Hendrix: Voodoo Child of The Aquarian Age. Cummins has taught photojournalism at Seton Hall University and at John Jay College and continues to work in photojournalism.
