= Steven R. Cummings =

American epidemiologist

- Scientific career
- Institutions: University of California San Francisco

Steven R. Cummings is an American epidemiologist and Emeritus Professor of Medicine, Epidemiology and Biostatistics at the University of California San Francisco. He is one of the top highly cited researchers (h>100) according to webometrics.
