= Frank E. Cummings III =

African-American artist and professor of fine arts

Frank E. Cummings III (born 1938) is an artist and professor of fine arts at California State University, Fullerton. Cummings makes wood vessels and furniture using precious materials, inspired by spiritual meanings of objects in Africa.

== Background ==
Cummings was born in Los Angeles, California in 1938. He received his Master of Arts from California State University, Fullerton in 1971. In 1973, Cummings received a grant from the National Endowment for the Arts to spend two months in Ghana exploring similarities between the identity struggles of African Americans and struggles faced in Africa. In 1981, he returned to Africa, exhibiting his work in Gabon, Ghana, Madagascar, and Malawi.

== Work ==
Cummings' first solo museum exhibition, Sensitivity, was at the Long Beach Museum of Art in 1974. His work is still exhibited at the museum.

The Lipton Collection contains wooden vessels made by Cummings. The Museum of Fine Arts, Boston, Minneapolis Institute of Art, and Smithsonian American Art Museum have pieces by Cummings in their collections. His work has been shown in the White House Collection of American Craft.

== Selected collections ==
- Minneapolis Institute of Art, Minneapolis, MN
- Smithsonian American Art Museum, New York, NY
- Museum of Fine Arts, Boston, MA
- Center for Art in Wood, Philadelphia, PA
