= Robert Cummings (rowing) =

Australian rower

Personal information
- Nationality: Australian
- Born: 19 May 1899 Murray Bridge, South Australia
- Died: 26 May 1969 (aged 70) Adelaide, South Australia
- Weight: 51 kg (112 lb)

Sport
- Sport: Rowing
- Club: Murray Bridge Rowing Club

Achievements and titles
- National finals: King's Cup 1920-26

Robert Arthur Cummings (19 May 1899 – 26 May 1969) was an Australian rowing coxswain. He was a three-time national champion who represented Australia in the 1924 Summer Olympics in the stern of the men's eight.

== Club and state rowing ==
Cummings was employed as a Postal Assistant and his senior rowing was from the Murray Bridge Rowing Club. The Murray Bridge Rowing Club men's eight was the dominant Australian club eight of the 1920s. They won the South Australian state championship from 1920 to 1923 and in 1921 by a margin of ten lengths. For the four years from 1920 to 1923 they were selected in-toto as the South Australian men's eight to contest the King's Cup at the Australian Interstate Regatta. Cummings was coxswain in each of those crews and steered the 1920, 1922 and 1923, South Australian eights to victory. In 1921, 1922 and 1923 he was in those crews with his older brother Frank Cummings.

== International representative rowing ==
The South Australian media pushed for the victorious 1920 King's Cup eight to be sent to the 1920 Antwerp Olympics but with the Victorian and New South Wales Rowing Association in control of selections and funding, there wasn't sufficient support for their campaign. By 1924 with South Australia continuing to dominate Australian eights rowing, their claim could not be denied and after winning a test event raced on Port Adelaide in March 1924, Cummings and the South Australian crew including his brother Frank, were selected in-toto to represent Australia as an eight at the 1924 Summer Olympics.

Funding was raised from the Murray Bridge Rowing Club, the South Australian Rowing Association and the general public of South Australia. The crew were nicknamed "the Murray Cods". Unlike the 1912 Olympic eight, the Murray Cods were not invited to race in lead-up at the Henley Royal Regatta and in 2000 Ted Thomas jnr a crew member's son, asserted that this was because the eight was crewed by working class men other than the stroke Bill Sladden It's undisputed that tour funds were scarce and on arrival in France, the crew had to row their shell 60 km to their training base; that on tour a number of the crew (including Cummings) busked as musicians to raise pocket money; and that on race day they first rowed their shell 26 miles from their boatshed to the Olympic course. Their equipment was also sub-par as they rowed with their oars turning in out-rigged poppets rather than in swivelling gates as had become the norm.

In the Olympic regatta, with Cummings in the stern the Australian eight finished second behind Italy in their heat, then finished third in the repechage and didn't advance to the final.

Bob Cummings continued on as a first-class coxswain after the Olympics. He coxed South Australian representative eights in the King's Cup campaigns of 1925 (fourth) and 1926 (second).
