= Milton K. Cummings =

Milton Kyser Cummings
- Born: August 12, 1911; Gadsden, Alabama, United States
- Died: March 7, 1973 (aged 61); Huntsville, Alabama, United States
- Occupation: Cotton broker/space-defense business executive
- Spouse: Vastus Ivy Cummings

Milton Kyser Cummings (August 12, 1911 – March 7, 1973) had a noteworthy career in two highly diverse fields: cotton broker and space-defense industry executive. Sometimes called the "Number One Citizen of Huntsville" and a "Symbol of the New South," he was recognized as a humanitarian, leader in opportunities for minorities and the handicapped, and advisor to government officials and congressmen. The Cummings Research Park, the second largest park of this type in America, was named to honor him.

== Early years ==
Cummings was born in Gadsden, Alabama, where his father, Charles Wesley Cummings, was the superintendent of a cotton gin. The elder Cummings was a second-generation native of Huntsville, Alabama, and soon moved his family back to that city. Afflicted with osteomyelitis, Milton lost a lower leg when he was four years old. He attended school in Huntsville and, coping well with an artificial leg, became an excellent tennis player. While still in school, he worked as an errand runner in the office of a cotton broker where his father was employed. Impressed with Milton's determination, intelligence, and handicap adjustment, the broker offered him a full scholarship to attend college as he finished high school at age 16. Feeling obliged to help support his family, he declined the offer of college but asked for employment in the brokerage firm. His father died a few years later, leaving Milton responsible for the family while still a teenager.

== Cotton broker and investor ==
In his early 20s, Cummings worked in the Shelby Fletcher Brokerage firm and learned the cotton brokering business during the Great Depression. In 1936, Fletcher suddenly died and left $5,000 for Cummings in his will. Using this inheritance, at age 25 he opened a brokerage. Madison and Limestone Counties in northern Alabama were (and still are) two of the largest cotton producers in the state. Cummings soon became well known to the farmers, buying their bailed cotton and selling it to the huge spinning and weaving cotton mills in Huntsville. Respected by all of the people involved as an 'honest broker,' Cummings was soon the most successful cotton merchant in the region.

In 1953, Cummings became dissatisfied with cotton brokering. In his words, “I didn't feel that President Eisenhower, Agriculture Secretary Benson, or even the American farmer really understood the agricultural problems of the day. Their policy showed they favored lower farm prices and uncontrolled production, inviting disaster for cotton, and for farmers in general.” His projection was verified by declining cotton profitability. Cummings became convinced that he should move from cotton brokering to investing. He devoted his financial expertise to managing personal investments in the stock market, setting up his own stock ticker. For the next several years, he paid constant attention to the market and soon amassed a considerable fortune.

== Industry executive ==
In 1957, Cummings was invited to invest in a new stock issue for Brown Engineering Company (BECO), a small industrial firm in Huntsville. Although BECO was almost bankrupt, Cummings recognized its potential of gaining a foothold in the emerging space market. He had become a friend of Wernher von Braun, who at that time was leading the space program development for the Army Ballistic Missile Agency (ABMA) at Redstone Arsenal. Convinced that the space field was where Huntsville business was headed, Cummings immediately made a major investment in BECO stock.

Sputnik I, the first artificial satellite of the Earth, was launched by the Soviet Union on 4 October 1957, energizing America to do likewise. After the failure of their Viking rocket in its first satellite launch attempt, this mission was taken away from the U.S. Naval Research Laboratory and given to the von Braun team at ABMA. On 31 January 1958, America's first satellite, Explorer I, was placed into orbit. BECO had an involvement in this historic effort, providing support in the design and testing of both the vehicle and the payload.

As the Nation watched via live television, Huntsville had an unequaled celebration. This previously unknown community in Alabama was suddenly at the center of the free-world's space race with the Soviet Union. The government laboratories on Redstone Arsenal, together with Huntsville's emerging industries, immediately acquired recognition as a center for high-technology. Cummings then knew that he was right in his business projection.

On 6 May 1958, the BECO Board asked Cummings, then the Board Chairman and largest investor in its stock, to serve 90 days as President. He accepted, but actually remained in that position for eight years. In Cummings' words, "Once I had the opportunity to more closely examine Brown Engineering, I became convinced of its great potential and accepted a permanent position." In a short time, he placed the firm on a sound financial footing. The stock was initially traded as over-the-counter, then, underwritten by Goodbody & Company, 110,000 shares became publicly traded under the symbol "BCO" on the American Stock Exchange in April 1964. At that time, there were about 1,400 stockholders, including almost 500 BECO employees.

Wernher von Braun had suggested to Cummings that Huntsville needed a central research park for the emerging space and defense industries. A large section of former farmland was found on the western edge of Huntsville, adjacent to the developing campus of the University of Alabama Huntsville Graduate Center (later to become the University of Alabama in Huntsville) and near to Redstone Arsenal. Through purchases and options, rights to hundreds of acres of this land was secured by Cummings (primarily to forestall speculators), and the Huntsville City Council was persuaded to designate 3,000 acres (1,200 ha) as the Huntsville Research Park.

BECO became the first occupant in the new park, opening a large complex in early 1962, and was soon followed by Lockheed, Northrop, Boeing, TRW, IBM, and other national firms. In 1973, shortly after Cummings' death, this was renamed the Cummings Research Park; it has now grown to become the second largest research park in America and one of the largest in the world.

Cummings' vision for BECO was that it would be involved in the full spectrum of space and defense activities, from initial research, through engineering development, to final manufacturing and testing. As the new BECO campus in the Research Park was developed, areas devoted to all of these activities were established. Engineering centered on a capability for space vehicle design, but there were also general capabilities in electronics, mechanical, civil, and other engineering disciplines. Manufacturing soon had digital-controlled machines, and was the largest local source for precision parts, printed circuits, and full system fabrication. In-house research was a newcomer to BECO capabilities; the Brown Engineering Research Laboratories had a two-story building devoted to analytical and experimental activities, including optics, propulsion, radar, computers, aerodynamics, and other high-technology areas.

Through adding well-qualified and experienced technical and administrative personnel, Cummings led BECO's growth from about 215 employees when he took over to over 3,700 when he retired in 1966.

=== Space business ===
The NASA Marshall Space Flight Center (MSFC) was formed on 1 July 1960, with a staff of about 4,000 former employees of ABMA and Wernher von Braun as Director. Cummings quickly secured a role for BECO in the development of the Saturn family of booster rockets. In May 1961, President John F. Kennedy proposed the national goal of "landing a man on the Moon and returning him safely to the Earth by the end of the 1960s,” and the Apollo program was underway.

During the first half of the 1960s, there was tremendous growth in the number of contractor firms and their activities at MSFC. In 1965, NASA directed MSFC to simplify the administration and obtain a single prime-support contractor for each of its laboratories. Cummings obtained permission from von Braun for BECO to propose on support to two of these major efforts. The company won the most sought-after efforts, those for the Propulsion & Vehicle Engineering Laboratory and for the Research Projects Laboratory. BECO was also a major subcontractor for two other laboratories.

From the beginning of the Apollo Program in early 1961 through the first human landing on the Moon by Apollo 11 on 20 July 1969, BECO (becoming Teledyne Brown Engineering in 1967) played a major, highly diverse role, providing approximately 20,000,000 man-hours of engineering, scientific, manufacturing, and administrative support. In 1969, Cummings received the NASA Public Service Award for his leadership. The citation reads as follows: "For his outstanding contributions as a key leader of the government-industry team that made possible the exceptional success of the Apollo Program."

=== Defense business ===
While a large part of the former ABMA went to form MSFC, there were still major U.S. Army activities on Redstone Arsenal, and BECO had work in some of these. In May 1962, most of the activities were consolidated to become the U.S. Army Missile Command (AMC). Although Cummings was mainly involved with increasing BECO's work for MSFC, he recognized the potential of business with AMC and established close relationships with many of the leaders. One of these was Colonel (later Brigadier General) Ivy O. Drewry, Manager of the new Anti-Ballistic Missile (ABM) program. In 1967, BECO's Research Laboratories became the support contractor for the emerging Nike-X ABM system. (Starting in the 1970s, the Safeguard Program, descendant of Nike-X, would become one of the company's largest contracted activities.)

Another AMC leader was Carl E. Duckett, at that time Director of the Missile Intelligence Directorate. Duckett and Cummings immediately had a mutual respect; both were from relatively modest backgrounds, neither had a college education, both were “people” oriented, and both had highly successful early careers. BECO's Research Laboratories performed highly classified intelligence studies, and Cummings received the first Top Secret security clearance granted to a Huntsville business executive. Although Duckett left AMC in the mid-1960s for a leading position with the Central Intelligence Agency, their relationship continued until Cummings' death.

=== Maturity and acquisition ===
By 1966, Brown Engineering Company provided services to the space and defense industries. The company held contracts with NASA's Marshall Space Flight Center (MSFC) and was involved in U.S. Army intelligence and missile defense projects. During this period, the company opened offices and subsidiaries in the Southern and Northeastern United States.

To ensure continuing vitality, BECO needed to enter new, more widespread markets. Cummings and his close staff made plans for a major change, gaining a national presence by acquiring, merging, or being acquired. After eight years as CEO, Cummings stepped down and, as Board Chairman, concentrated on BECO's future. In April 1966, the BECO Board elected Joseph C. Moquin, the existing Executive Vice President, to be President.

Late in 1966, Cummings initiated negotiations between BECO and Teledyne, Inc., of Los Angeles concerning the merger of the two companies. This led to BECO's being acquired in April 1967 to become Teledyne Brown Engineering, Inc. (TBE), a wholly owned subsidiary of Teledyne, Inc. A TBE board was maintained, with Cummings remaining Chairman until his death in 1973.

== Personal life ==
Despite his physical disability, as a young man Cummings was a champion tennis player, regularly winning open competitions. During and after World War II, he gave demonstrations to amputees at Army hospitals. He also became an avid golfer, maintaining a handicap of only a few strokes.

Throughout his career, Cummings was a “people” person. While fully at ease with persons on all social strata, he especially identified himself with the working class. At BECO, he frequently visited the manufacturing facilities, where he knew many of the workers by name. He often expressed the belief, “We are our brother's keeper,” and so conducted his personal life as well as his business activities.

For Cummings, a lifelong Democrat, political acumen played an important part in his success. He was a neighbor and close friend of John Sparkman, long-time member of the U.S. Senate and very influential in programs at Redstone Arsenal. Bob Jones of Scottsboro, Alabama, a member of the U.S. House of Representatives, was another of Cummings' Washington friends. At an even higher level, Cummings was a frequent visitor of Lyndon Johnson in the White House. As a result, a number of BECO employees received invitations to Johnson's presidential inauguration in 1963.

He was continually involved with fund-raising drives and campaigns for improving health, education, and employment opportunities in the region. In 1949, Milton founded a nonprofit, Christmas Charities Year Round to help local families after a boll weevil infestation devastated the area cotton crop. Since then, CCYR has been providing for children and their families with basic necessities, to help improve the quality of life throughout our shared community. The Milton K. Cummings Humanitarian Award was established in his name by the Community Action Partnership-Huntsville/Madison and Limestone Counties, Inc.

In 1961, Cummings and Wernher von Braun successfully lobbied the Alabama Legislature for funds to establish in Huntsville the University of Alabama in Huntsville Research Institute. The approved Institute initially occupied space in BECO facilities before construction started on the university's campus in December 1962. Today, that building on The University of Alabama in Huntsville campus is named Von Braun Research Hall in honor of the rocket pioneer.

Cummings set an example for Southern firms in equal opportunity employment, long before it was federally mandated. In 1963, he was a principal founder and first President of the Association of Area Companies (AHAC), a Huntsville organization devoted to ensuring equal opportunity of minorities in employment, education, housing, and community affairs. Huntsville led Alabama in all aspects of race relations.

Cummings was also in the forefront of providing employment opportunities for the handicapped. An article in the company's newsletter describes the contributions being made by 25 physically handicapped employees. Well before any Federal requirements, Cummings had BECO provide full accommodations for these "special resources."

Cummings received recognitions and honors. These included the following: The United States House of Representatives recognized him through a Memorial Tribute being read into its minutes in 1973. Auburn University conferred the degree Doctor of Laws, Honoris Causa, on Cummings in August 1962. Previously noted was Cummings' recognition in 1969 by the National Aeronautics and Space Administration as an industrial leader in the Apollo Program.

Cummings married Nanny Vastus Ivy in 1936. They had three daughters, Jean, Carol Ann, and Nancy, and William Brooks Wilkinson was his step-son. A Christian, Cummings was a deacon for 23 years and then an elder in the Presbyterian Church.
