= Ida R. Cummings =

American teacher and clubwoman (1867-1958)

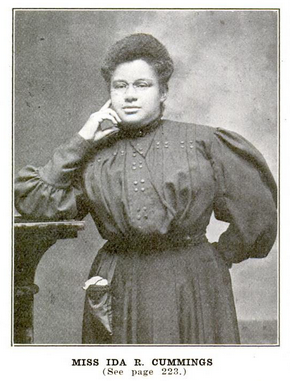
- Ida R. Cummings, from a 1912 issue of The Crisis
- Born: March 17, 1867
- Died: November 1958 (aged 91)
- Education: Morgan College
- Occupation: teacher
- Known for: National Association of Colored Women's Clubs

Ida R. Cummings (March 17, 1867 – November 1958) was an American teacher and clubwoman, based in Baltimore, Maryland. She was an officer of the National Association of Colored Women's Clubs in the 1910s.

== Early life and education ==
Ida Rebecca Cummings was raised in Baltimore, the daughter of Henry and Eliza Jane Davage Cummings. Her father was a chef, and her mother ran a boarding house.

Ida and her siblings were active in Baltimore's public life. Her brother, Harry Sythe Cummings, served on the City Council as its first black councilman; in 1904 he seconded the nomination of Theodore Roosevelt at the Republican National Convention. Their sister Estella married another Baltimore city councilman, Joseph C. Fennell, and another brother, Charles Gilmor Cummings, was a prominent clergyman in the city; Charles's wife was Grace Shimm Cummings, a teacher from another family of teachers.

Ida R. Cummings graduated from Morgan College, and attended the Columbia University Summer School for teachers in 1922. Later she would serve as the first female trustee at Morgan College.

== Career ==
Ida R. Cummings was the first black kindergarten teacher in Baltimore. She was a teacher in the segregated schools of Baltimore County, Maryland, first at Sparrow's Point, and later in the city. In 1902 she was elected to serve on the executive committee of the Colored Teachers' Association of Maryland.

She was elected corresponding secretary of the National Association of Colored Women's Clubs in 1912, and was elected vice president in 1916. She was an officer of the first Farmers' Wives and Rural Women's Conference, which met in Baltimore in 1917.

Ida R. Cummings was also active in church work in Baltimore, as a member of Metropolitan Methodist Episcopal Church and as president of the Colored Empty Stocking and Fresh Air Circle, which gave an annual festival to raise funds for the city's poor black children to have Christmas gifts and a summer trip to a nearby farm. She wrote an essay that was included in Methodism and the Negro (1910).

During World War I, she was appointed chair of the state's Women's Section Council of Defense. In 1938, Ida R. Cummings was appointed by the governor of Maryland to the Board of Managers for the Cheltenham School for Boys.

== Personal life ==
Ida R. Cummings died in 1958, aged 91 years. The collected papers of her brother's granddaughter, Charlene Hodges Byrd, contain some letters regarding or addressed to Ida R. Cummings.
