= Marian Cummings =

First woman in the US to gain a commercial pilot's license

Marian Engle Cummings
- Born: Marian Engle c. 1892
- Died: 1984

Marian Engle Cummings (c. 1892–1984), was the first woman in the US to gain a commercial pilot's license.

== Biography ==
Marian Engle was born circa 1892 to Alice Warbass and Abraham W. Engle of Seattle. She was educated in Westover School graduating in 1910. She went on to marry lawyer Wilbur Love Cummings and moved to Greenwich with her husband.

Cummings got her pilot's license in 1932 having learned to fly in North Beach, now LaGuardia Airport. She worked as a corporate pilot for her husband. The couple had a daughter and son. Both of the children learned to fly, Molly gaining her license at age 18. As a family they performed stunts in their aircraft at fields such as Armonk, Hartford, and Long Island until the Second World War. Cummings joined the Civil Air Patrol where she was a captain and a ferry pilot for the Army Air Corps. Cummings' daughter Molly also joined the Civil Air Patrol and her son Billy joined the Navy Air Corps transporting planes to the UK. Billy was killed in a crash on takeoff.
