= Bill Cummings =

Bill Cummings may refer to:

- Bill Cummings (racing driver) (1906–1939) winner of the 1937 Indianapolis 500
- Bill Cummings (philanthropist), American philanthropist
- Bill Cummings (politician), former state legislator in Georgia
- William Cummings (disambiguation)
