= Gaylord G. Cummings =

American politician (1894–1981)

Member of the New Hampshire House of Representatives from the Grafton 12th district
- In office 1974–1976

Personal details
- Born: December 20, 1894
- Died: February 21, 1981 (aged 86)
- Party: Republican

Gaylord G. Cummings (December 20, 1894 – February 21, 1981) was an American politician. He served as a Republican member for the Grafton 12th district of the New Hampshire House of Representatives.
