= John Cummings (piper) =

Professor John Cummings (c. 1828-after 1913) was an Irish piper.

A son of Patrick Cummins (fl. 1820s), Cummings was raised near Athenry, where his family had performed and taught music for generations. The family name was originally rendered Cummins but the spelling was changed to Cummings in his lifetime. He was given the honorary title of Professor in light of the esteem people held his musical abilities.

Cummings worked in England from about 1850 to 1892, in Liverpool where he worked in building and became friends with the piper/pipemaker Michael Egan, and London, "where he had much to do with the handling and care of horses."

In 1892 he left England for San Francisco, where he lived with his daughter, Mrs. Hogan. Only in 1912, as a result of the Gaelic Revival did he come to a wide audience; previously he performed privately. He was held, despite his age, to be the equal of Patsy Touhey and Barney Delaney.
