= Joe Cummings (American football) =

American football player (born 1974)

No. 51, 99, 52
- Position: Linebacker

Personal information
- Born: June 8, 1974 (age 52); Missoula, Montana, U.S.
- Listed height: 6 ft 2 in (1.88 m)
- Listed weight: 242 lb (110 kg)

Career information
- High school: Stevensville (Stevensville, Montana)
- College: Wyoming
- NFL draft: 1996: undrafted

Career history
- Philadelphia Eagles (1996)*; San Diego Chargers (1996); Green Bay Packers (1997)*; Barcelona Dragons (1998); Buffalo Bills (1998–1999); Orlando Rage (2001)
- * Offseason or practice squad member only

Awards and highlights
- First-team All-WAC (1996)

Career NFL statistics
- Tackles: 28
- Sacks: 1
- Stats at Pro Football Reference

Joe Edward Cummings (born June 8, 1974) is an American former professional football player who was a linebacker in the National Football League (NFL). He played college football for the Wyoming Cowboys.

== Early life ==
Cummings was born in Missoula, Montana and grew up in Stevensville, Montana. He attended Stevensville High School and was named the Montana Gatorade Player of the Year as a senior.

== College career ==
Cummings was a three year starter for the Wyoming Cowboys. As a senior, he recorded eight sacks and 10 tackles for loss and was named first-team All-Western Athletic Conference.

== Professional career ==
Following the 1996 NFL draft, Cummings was signed by the Philadelphia Eagles as an undrafted free agent on April 26, 1996 but was cut during training camp. He was later signed by the San Diego Chargers and played in three games for the team. He was a member of the Green Bay Packers in 1997 during the off season but was cut at the end of training camp. Cummings signed with the Buffalo Bills, who allocated him to the Barcelona Dragons and then spent the 1998 and 1999 seasons with the team. Cummings also played for the Orlando Rage of the XFL in 2001.

== Personal life ==
Cummings father, Ed Cummings, played linebacker in the American Football League for the New York Jets and Denver Broncos.
