= Pat Cummings (disambiguation) =

Pat Cummings (1956–2012) was an American basketball player.

Pat Cummings may also refer to:

- Pat Cummings (illustrator) (born 1950), American illustrator and writer

== See also ==
- Patrick Cumming (1741–1820), Scottish professor
- Pat Cummins (born 1993), Australian international cricketer
- Patrick Cummins (disambiguation)
