= Harry S. Cummings =

American lawyer and politician (1866–1917)

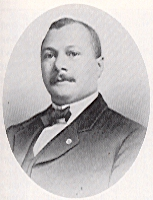
- Born: May 1866
- Died: September 7, 1917

Harry Sythe Cummings (May 19, 1866 – September 7, 1917) was a lawyer, fraternal leader, and the first African American Councilman of Baltimore City. Born to Henry and Eliza Cummings in 1866, he was the second eldest of eight children. Due to the lack of educational opportunities in Baltimore, Cummings attended Lincoln University in Pennsylvania where he received his bachelor's degree . He later attended University of Maryland School of Law where he became one the first African Americans to graduate from the program in 1889. He founded the 1st Manuel Training School for Colored Youth in Baltimore City which at the time was named Colored Polytechnic Institute. An active Republican, in 1904 Cummings delivered a speech at the Republican National Convention endorsing the presidency of Theodore Roosevelt.

Harry S.Cummings was elected to the Baltimore City Council in 1890 from the 17 ward. He was the first black to hold the office. He notably defeated Louis Davenport 288 to 50 in 1907. He secured a scholarship to the Maryland Institute for Harry S. Pratt. He introduced a bill requesting $400,000 for a new school building in his district to alleviate the overcrowding at the high school located at Pennsylvania Avenue and Dolphin Street. While practicing law, he also was recommended by City Councilman Hiram Watty to be on the board of directors of the Colored House of Reformation during a brief period he was not acting as a councilman.

Throughout the life of Harry S. Cummings, he was a man who achieved a lot of great things during his time of living. One important accomplishment was becoming the first African-American City Councilman for Baltimore City. Cummings was considered a very influential person of his time. He was not the only Cummings in his family that had surpassed barriers and achieved astounding accomplishments. His siblings Aaron Cummings and Ida Cummings also exceeded barriers and expectations of African-Americans during this time. Aaron became the first "colored" United States Postal Service in Baltimore City. Ida Cummings became one of the first black kindergarten teachers in Baltimore City. Harry was also a husband and a father. He married Blanche Teresa Conklin and had two children, named Harry Sythe Cummings Jr. And Louise Virginia Cummings Dorcas. Cummings was very active in his career and served as councilman until his death in 1917.

== See also ==
- African American officeholders from the end of the Civil War until before 1900
- Harry Sythe Cummings Manuscript Collection from Enoch Pratt Free Library at Digital Maryland
