= David Cummings =

David Cummings may refer to:

- David Cummings (musician), British musician and scriptwriter
- Dave Cummings (1940–2019), American porn star
- Dave Cummings (entrepreneur), owner and founder of Tradebot and BATS Global Markets
- David Cummings (wrestler) (1948–1985), Canadian Olympic wrestler
- D. C. Cummings (1861–1942), British trade unionist
- David Cummings (athlete) (1894–1987), British athlete
- David C. Cummings Jr. (1861–1913), member of the Virginia Senate
