= Maxwell Cummings =

Canadian real estate builder and philanthropist

- Born: April 19, 1898; Saint John, New Brunswick
- Died: May 23, 2001 (aged 103)
- Known for: real estate builder and philanthropist

Maxwell Cummings (born Komiensky), CM GOQ (April 19, 1898 – May 23, 2001) was a Canadian real estate builder and philanthropist.

Born in Saint John, New Brunswick, the son of David and Beatrice Cummings, he came to Montreal with his family in 1911. His siblings included Harold Cummings (car dealership), Nathan Cummings (Consolidated Foods, which later became Sara Lee Corporation), and Minnie (Abbey). In 1929, he began a career in real estate brokerage and development. He was responsible for Canada's first strip mall, the Norgate shopping centre in Saint-Laurent (now part of Montreal) and was one of the first Canadians to develop low-cost housing (lots of so-called veteran homes all over Montreal).

He was a prominent member of the Montreal Jewish community. His offspring include the late philanthropist and entrepreneur Jack Cummings and businessman Robert Cummings. Jack's children include Steven Cummings, who like his grandfather has received the Order of Canada, Richard Cummings, former Executive Director of Jewish Family and Child Toronto, and Nancy Cummings-Gold, former president of The PACCK Foundation and wife of Senator Marc Gold.

In 1978, Maxwell Cummings was made a Member of the Order of Canada and a Grand officer of the National Order of Quebec in 1990.
