= Grace Shimm Cummings =

Educator

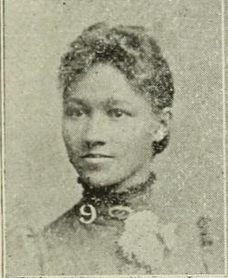
Grace Shimm Cummings in a 1902 publication

Grace Shimm Cummings (1865–1910) was an American educator.

== Early life ==
Grace Ella Shimm was born in Pennsylvania, the elder daughter of William Y. Shimm, a barber, and Sarah A. Thomas Shimm, a teacher and writer. She had a younger sister, Erminie (Minnie). Grace Shimm graduated from Miner Normal School in 1884, as class valedictorian.

== Career ==
Grace and Erminie Shimm both became teachers in the segregated schools of Washington, D.C. Grace also served as an organist at church functions, and wrote poetry for publication.

In 1902 she addressed the Negro Young People's Christian and Educational Congress in Atlanta, with a speech titled "The Public School Teacher and the Religious Forces," in which she declared, "The teacher's calling is no light vocation." That same year she resigned from teaching third grade, to marry.

== Personal life ==
Grace E. Shimm married Charles Gilmore Cummings, a prominent preacher, in 1902. Educator Ida R. Cummings was her sister-in-law. Grace and Charles had one surviving daughter, Joyce Ethel Cummings, born in 1903. Grace E. Shimm died in 1910, aged 45 years. Two years later, Charles remarried, to Rosa Bearden, the grandmother of artist Romare Bearden.

Papers related to Grace Shimm Cummings, including her scrapbook and an autograph book, are in the Charlene Hodges Byrd Collection at the Smithsonian's National Museum of African American History and Culture. Byrd, who was also a teacher, was Cummings' granddaughter.
