= Edwin Cummings =

New Zealand cricketer

Personal information
- Full name: Edwin Moon Cummings
- Born: 29 January 1885; Dunedin, Otago, New Zealand
- Died: 22 November 1951 (aged 66); Christchurch, Canterbury, New Zealand
- Relatives: George Cummings (brother)

Domestic team information
- Years: Team
- 1909/10–1910/11: Otago
- Source: ESPNcricinfo, 8 May 2016

Edwin Moon Cummings (29 January 1885 – 22 November 1951) was a New Zealand cricketer. He played two first-class matches for Otago, one in each of the 1909–10 and 1911–12 seasons.

Cummings was born at Dunedin in 1885. He worked as a timber merchant. His older brother George Cummings played cricket for Otago and Auckland. Cummings made his senior debut for the Otago side in a match against the touring Australians at Carisbrook in March 1910. Opening the bowling, he took the first two Australian wickets to fall in the match. His only other first-class match for the side came later in the same year in a Christmas fixture against Canterbury.

Cummings died at Christchurch in 1951. He was aged 66.
