= Senator Cummings =

Senator Cummings may refer to:

- Ann Cummings (born 1946), Vermont State Senate
- David C. Cummings Jr. (1861–1913), Virginia State Senate
- John W. Cummings (1855–1929), Massachusetts State Senate
- John Cummings (Massachusetts banker) (1812–1898), Massachusetts State Senate
- Thomas L. Cummings Sr. (1891–1968), Tennessee State Senate

== See also ==
- Albert B. Cummins (1850–1926), U.S. Senator from Iowa from 1908 to 1926
