= Emma G. Cummings =

American naturalist, ornithologist and author

Emma Gertrude Cummings (December 2, 1856 – October 12, 1940) was an American horticulturalist and ornithologist.

== Early life and education ==
Cummings was born in Cambridge, Massachusetts, and lived mainly in the town of Brookline. She was educated at Boston Art School.

== Career ==
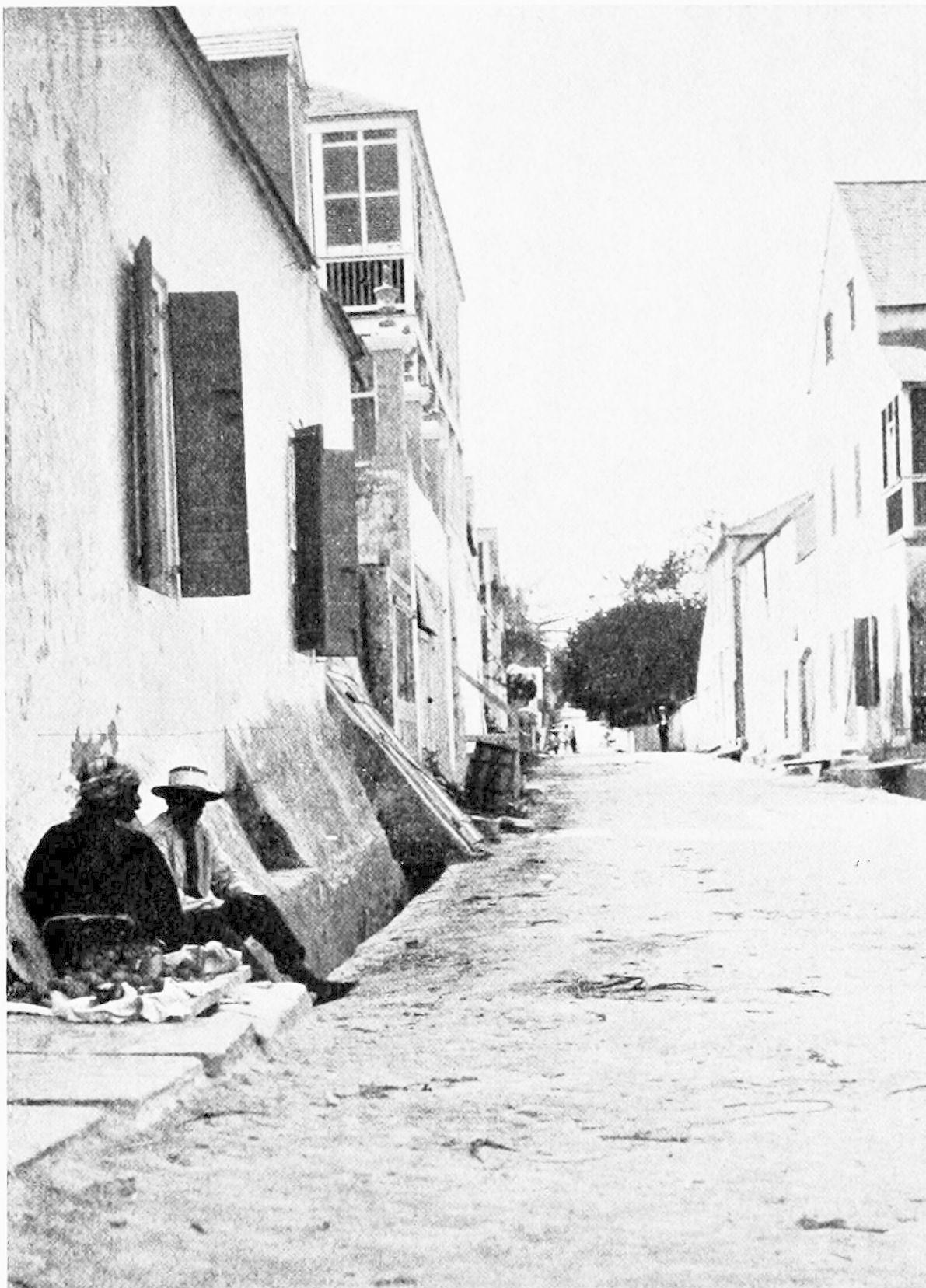
"A street in Nassau" from her 1898 trip to the Bahamas

Cummings was an active participant in Brookline civic life. In 1897 she contributed a chapter on botany to the town's publication Brookline: The History of a Favored Town. The following April she published an account of the people and flora of the Bahamas, "A Spring Visit to Nassau" in Popular Science Monthly.

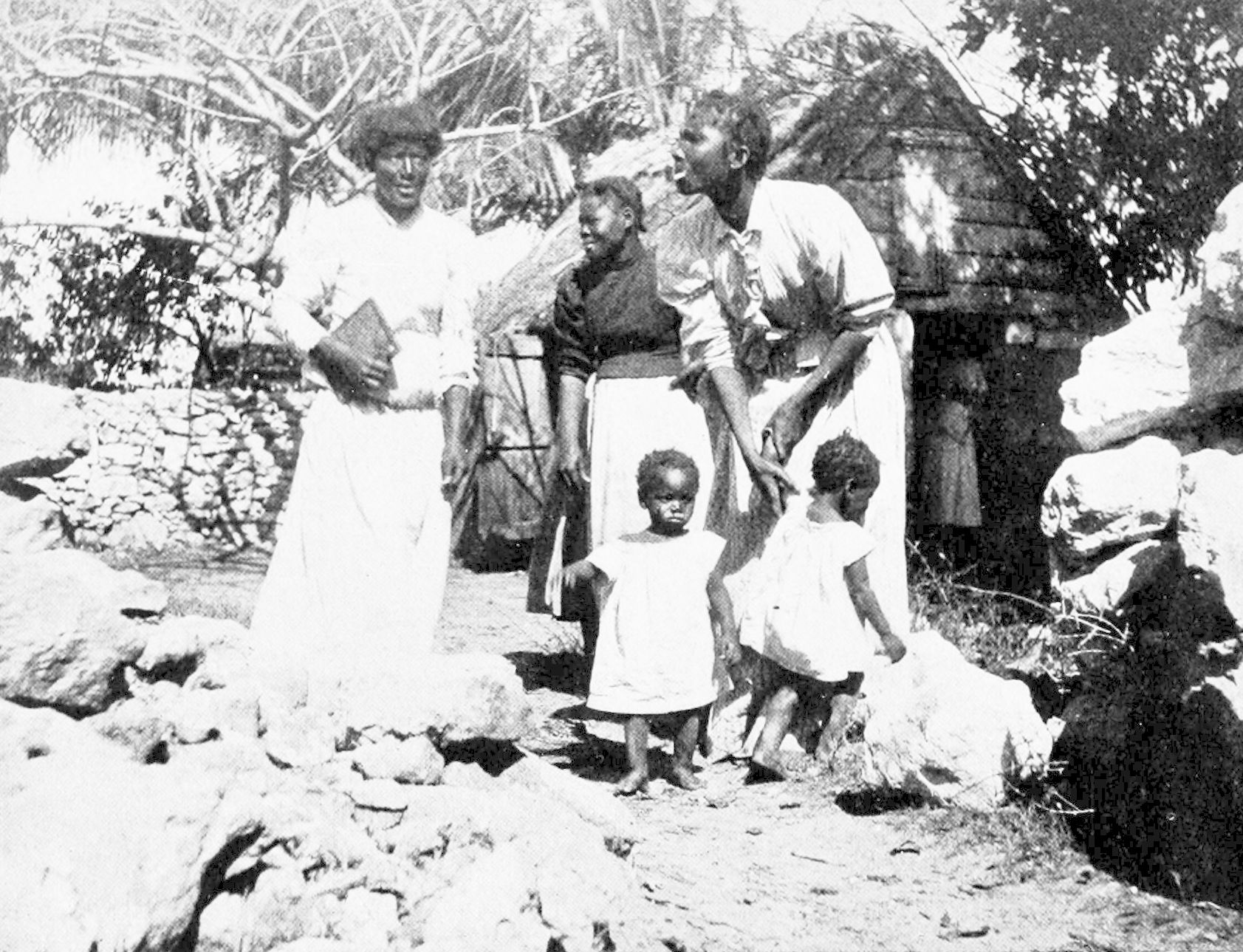
"Native Twins" image from her 1898 trip to the Bahamas

Cummings was the first woman to hold a town office in Brookline, when she was elected a member of the town's tree planting committee, from 1902-1939. Cummings was elected an Associate of the American Ornithologists' Union in 1903. Also in 1903, she gave a lecture to the Massachusetts Horticultural Society about trees in the Southern United States. In 1904 her ornithological pocket guide Baby Pathfinder to the Birds, co-authored with Harriet E. Richards, was described in The Auk as "a convenient and helpful vade mecum", praised in the Journal of Education as a valuable guide that "no beginner or would-be beginner should be without", and cited by the Boston Herald as evidence of Cummings' exemplary status as a "twentieth century woman." She was a member of the tree planting committee from 1902 to 1939, and in 1938 published a book on the committee's history and notable trees of the town. Her book Brookline's Trees was praised by The Boston Globe, and the Boston Herald noted that it was "much used by teachers and in schools." Cummings was also a member of the Brookline Historical Society and gave talks to the membership on her travels, such as to Hawaii in 1923, and she was on the science sub-committee of the Brookline Education Society.

== Personal life ==
Cummings lived with her sister Mabel Cummings, and died in October 1940 in Westfield, Massachusetts.

== Selected works ==
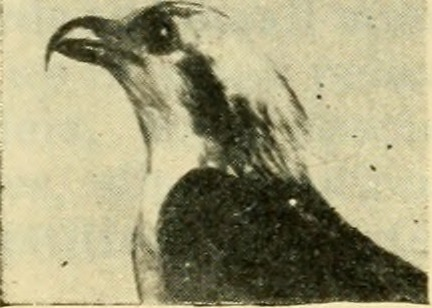
picture from "Baby bird-finder by Harriet E. Richards and Emma G. Cummings

- Brookline's Trees: A History of the Committee for Planting Trees of Brookline, Massachusetts and a Record of Some of Its Trees, 1938
- Baby Pathfinder to the Birds (with Harriet E. Richards), 1904
- Trees in Brookline, Massachusetts: Map and Index (with Frances Prince), 1900
