= Scott Cummings =

Scott Cummings may refer to:

- Scott Cummings (footballer), Australian rules footballer
- Scott Cummings (rugby union), Scottish rugby union player
- Scott Cummings (darts player), Canadian darts player
