= Frank Cummins (footballer) =

Australian rules footballer

Personal information
- Full name: Frank Gerald Cummins
- Born: 26 September 1896; Elmore, Victoria
- Died: 23 May 1971 (aged 74); Elsternwick, Victoria
- Original team: Navy
- Height: 174 cm (5 ft 9 in)

Playing career^{1}
Years	Club	Games (Goals)
1918	South Melbourne	1 (0)
1919	Melbourne	1 (0)
Total		2 (0)
- ^{1} Playing statistics correct to the end of 1919.

Frank Gerald Cummins (26 September 1896 – 23 May 1971) was an Australian rules footballer who played with South Melbourne and Melbourne in the Victorian Football League (VFL).
