= Patrick Cummins (piper) =

Patrick Cummins, a.k.a. Cummings (fl. 1820s) was an Irish piper and tutor.

Cummins was a native of or near Athenry, where his family had kept a 'college' for pipers for generations. He himself taught many pipers, such as Owen Cunnigam, Michael Kenny (piper), Patsy Mullin, Michael Touhey (grandfather of Patsy Touhey), and his own son, Professor John Cummings (1828-after 1913).
