= J. David Cummins =

American business economist

John David Cummins is an American business economist, currently the Joseph E. Boettner Chair Emeritus of Risk Management and Insurance at Temple University, formerly the Harry J. Loman Professor of Business Economics and Public Policy at Wharton School of the University of Pennsylvania and then also formerly President of American Risk and Insurance Association.
