= Cumings (surname) =

Cumings is a surname.

As an Irish surname, it is anglicised from Irish Gaelic surname Ó Comáin

Notable people with the surname include:

- Alison Cumings (born 1961), English squash player
- Bruce Cumings (born 1943), American historian, professor, lecturer, and author
- Eartha Cumings (born 1999), Scottish footballer
- Henry H. Cumings (1840–1913), American politician from Pennsylvania

== See also ==
- Cummings (disambiguation)
