= James Cummings =

James Cummings may refer to:

- James Cummings (academic), Anglo-Canadian academic (born 1971)
- James Cummings (Ontario politician) (1815–1894), Canadian politician
- James Cummings (police officer) (1878–1976), New Zealand policeman and police commissioner
- James H. Cummings (1890–1979), politician from Tennessee
- James G. Cummings, American white supremacist found with material for a dirty bomb
- Jim Cummings (born 1952), American voice actor and singer
- Jim Cummings (filmmaker) (born 1986), American actor and filmmaker
- Jimmy Cummings (born 1968), American actor and CEO of Broadview Entertainment
- Bart Cummings (James Bartholomew Cummings, 1927–2015), Australian racehorse trainer
- Glen Cummings (politician) (James Glen Cummings, born 1944), politician from Manitoba, Canada

== See also ==
- James Cuming (disambiguation)
- James Cumming (disambiguation)
- James Cummins (disambiguation)
- Jim Cummins (disambiguation)
