= Charles Cummings =

Charles Cummings may refer to:

- Charles Amos Cummings (1833–1905), American architect and architectural historian
- Charles A. Cummings, American politician, mayor of Flint, Michigan in 1900–01
- Charles Cummings (actor) (c. 1870–1918), American silent film performer
- Charles Cummings (basketball) (1908–2003), American basketball coach
- Robert Cummings (Charles Clarence Robert Orville Cummings, 1910–1990), American actor

== See also ==
- Charles Cumming (born 1971), Scottish writer of spy fiction
- Charles Atherton Cumming, American painter
