= Science Advances =

American academic journal

- Discipline: Multidisciplinary
- Language: English
- Edited by: Holden Thorp, Ali Shilatifard

Publication details
- History: 2015–present
- Publisher: American Association for the Advancement of Science
- Open access: Yes
- License: CC BY or CC BY-NC
- Impact factor: 13.9 (2025)

Standard abbreviations
- ISO 4: Sci. Adv.

Indexing
- ISSN: 2375-2548
- LCCN: 2014203143
- OCLC no.: 892343396

Links
- Journal homepage; Online archive

Science Advances is a peer-reviewed multidisciplinary open-access scientific journal established in early 2015 and published by the American Association for the Advancement of Science. The journal's scope includes all areas of science.

== History ==
The journal was announced by the American Association for the Advancement of Science in February 2014, and the first articles were published in early 2015. In 2019, Science Advances surpassed Science Magazine in the number of monthly submissions, becoming the largest member in the Science family of journals. It is the only member of that family where all papers are gold open access.

== Editorial structure and journal scope ==
The journal's scope includes all areas of science, including life sciences, public health, neurosciences, physical sciences, social sciences, computer sciences, environmental sciences, and space sciences. Editorial decisions are made by the editorial board. The board is divided into topical areas, each led by a deputy editor and composed of a group of associate editors. Unlike other members of the Science family of journals published by AAAS, editors at Science Advances are working scientists.

== Open access policies ==
All content published in the journal is freely accessible to readers. When the journal was launched, its policy of using a default open license which does not permit commercial usage (CC NC-BY) was criticized by open access advocates, who preferred the less restrictive license that allows any use as long as attribution is provided (CC BY).

== See also ==
- Nature Communications, a journal related to Nature as Science Advances is to Science
