= Peter Cummings =

Peter Cummings may be:

- Peter Cummings (architect) (1879–1957), Russian-English architect
- Peter T. Cummings (born 1954), Australian-American chemical engineer

== See also ==
- Peter Cummins (1931–2024), Australian actor
- Peter Cumming, Australian former politician
