= Samuel Cummings =

American businessman

- Born: Samuel Cummings; February 7, 1927; Philadelphia, Pennsylvania, United States
- Died: April 29, 1998 (aged 71); Monte Carlo, Monaco
- Education: George Washington University
- Occupations: Arms dealer, businessman
- Spouse: Irma Cummings
- Children: Susan Cummings; Diana Cummings

Samuel Cummings (February 7, 1927 – April 29, 1998) was an American small arms dealer. He founded the International Armament Corporation (also known as Interarms or Interarmco) in 1953, a company which came to dominate the free world market in private arms sales. He died on April 29, 1998, in Monaco after a series of strokes.

== Biography ==
Cummings was born in Philadelphia and became interested in weapons after acquiring a Maxim gun from a disused American Legion hall at the age of five. Cummings became a US Army weapons specialist at Fort Lee, Virginia, after World War II. Following his military discharge he attended George Washington University on the GI Bill, where he was recruited in 1950 by the Central Intelligence Agency as a weapons expert.

Cummings then toured Europe, where he bought large quantities of surplus World War II weapons for both Hollywood productions and the Taiwan government These included .45 ACP Ballester-Molina pistols purchased from Argentina for British covert operations. During this time he was also called upon to identify captured weapons in the Korean War.

In 1953 Cummings set up Interarmco in Alexandria, Virginia, with a warehouse in Manchester, England, and other international locations to capitalize on the vast stores of postwar arms and ammunition. He used his contacts and expertise to acquire surplus weapons in large quantities to sell to various private and government buyers throughout the world. Interarmco was owned by the Central Intelligence Agency when Cummings took control, but he bought out the CIA interest and became sole owner in 1958.

In the 1950s and 1960s, Interarmco flooded the American market with military firearms, catering to souvenir-hungry GIs and sportsmen, and drastically undercutting domestic sporting-arms manufacturers. At the same time, Cummings became an export sales agent for various small arms manufacturers. Interarmco was an original exclusive agent for ArmaLite, and Cummings personally demonstrated its revolutionary AR-10 selective-fire rifle to various nations, including Nicaragua and the Dominican Republic. The Nicaraguan demonstration succeeded in what would have been the first-ever AR-10 export sale to the nation of Nicaragua in 1957 (later cancelled). In 1958, Cummings sold 100 ArmaLite AR-10 rifles to Cuban dictator Fulgencio Batista, but in 1959 the entire shipment of AR-10 rifles was captured intact on the Havana docks by the victorious rebel forces of Fidel Castro. Cummings wrote Castro and asked him if he would pay for the rifles or return them, and was invited to visit Cuba in return. Reportedly impressed with the firepower of the AR-10, Castro paid for the rifles and asked for more, but the American arms embargo to Cuba prohibited further sales. Castro later gave the rifles to rebels seeking to overthrow the leader of the Dominican Republic, General Rafael Trujillo. In June 1959, the rebels invaded the Dominican Republic in a combined air/sea operation. Betrayed by local residents, the seaborne rebel forces (led by Cuban officers), were surprised at the water's edge; those dropping via parachute were hunted down in the following days by the Dominican army. Captured AR-10 rifles from Cummings' Batista shipment were found on the bodies of guerrillas killed in firefights with government forces. When Cummings arrived in the Dominican Republic that same month to discuss the subject of arms sales with the nation's arms procurement officer, an enraged Trujillo stormed into the room carrying an AR-10 rifle taken off the body of a dead insurgent, demanding to know why Cummings had supplied guns to his enemies. During this time period, Cummings became a British subject and moved to Monte Carlo, Monaco, while maintaining warehouses worldwide and the company headquarters in Alexandria.

Cummings' arms import business was significantly affected after surplus military firearm imports were greatly restricted by the US Gun Control Act of 1968. Before the act came into effect Cummings imported vast numbers of overseas arms and stockpiled his Alexandria warehouses sufficiently to meet demand for several years.

His daughter Susan Cummings was convicted of voluntary manslaughter in 1998, after shooting her boyfriend Roberto Villegas.

Interarms was later acquired by the High Standard Manufacturing Company.

== In popular culture ==
Samuel Cummings and Interarms appear as relevant subjects in the well known 1974 Italian movie While There's War There's Hope ("Finché c'è guerra c'è speranza") starring and directed by Alberto Sordi. Cummings also appears in Anthony Sampson's 1991 two-part BBC2 documentary about the arms trade, The Two Edged Sword, interviewed at Interarms' Manchester warehouse.

On the history podcast This Guy Sucked, historians Claire E. Aubin and Drew McKevitt suggested that Cummings was at least partially responsible for getting Americans hooked on gun ownership, leading to its crises of mass shootings and violence.

== In academia ==
Interarms is covered by the 2023 book Gun Country: Gun Capitalism, Culture, and Control in Cold War America published by University of North Carolina Press.
