= Jeremiah Cummings =

Jeremiah Cummings may refer to:

- Jeremiah Williams Cummings, Roman Catholic priest in the 19th century
- Jeremiah Cummings (minister), minister previously also a member of the band Harold Melvin & the Blue Notes
