= Martin Marc Cummings =

Martin Marc Cummings, MD (1920-2011), was director of the National Library of Medicine (NLM) from 1964 to 1983, and subsequently Distinguished Professor at Georgetown University School of Medicine . During his two decades at the NLM, it was transformed into a unique international biomedical communications center and one of the most advanced scientific libraries in the world. During this time, NLM was established as a new, civilian entity on the National Institutes of Health campus in Bethesda, Maryland. [it was already a civilian agency, and already on campus, but became an official component of NIH in 1968].

== Early life and education ==
Cummings was born in Camden, New Jersey on September 7, 1920. He received his Bachelor of Arts degree from Bucknell University in 1941 and his doctorate in medicine from Duke University in 1944. His medical research interests included the treatment of sarcoidosis and tuberculosis. In 1946 Cummings completed a U.S. Public Health Service internship and residency at the Boston Marine Hospital, after which he became a commissioned officer in the Public Health Service. In this capacity he received extensive training in bacteriology and tuberculosis at the Michigan State Health Department and the Serum Institute of Denmark. Upon completion of his training he served as Director of the Tuberculosis Evaluation Laboratory at the Communicable Disease Center (now the Centers for Disease Control and Prevention) in Atlanta, Georgia.

== Career ==
In 1949 Cummings joined the U.S. Veterans Administration's Department of Medicine and Surgery. He served from 1949 to 1953 as Chief of the Tuberculosis Section and Director of the Tuberculosis Research Laboratory at the V.A.'s Lawson General Hospital in Chamblee, Georgia. In 1953 he became Director of Research Services at the V.A.'s Central Office in Washington, D.C., serving until 1959.

During his time at the V.A. he also taught at several medical universities. Starting in 1948 he began teaching as an Instructor of Medicine at Emory University School of Medicine in Atlanta, Georgia, rising to the positions of Assistant Professor of Medicine and Associate Professor of Bacteriology by 1953. While at the V.A.'s Central Office he taught at the George Washington School of Medicine, lecturing there in microbiology until 1959. From 1959 to 1961 he was Chairman and Professor of the Department of Microbiology at the University of Oklahoma School of Medicine.

In 1961 Cummings accepted the position of Chief of the Office of International Research at the National Institutes of Health, serving until 1963. Over the next year he served as Associate Director for Research Grants before becoming the Director of the National Library of Medicine in 1964.

Under Cummings' leadership, the National Library of Medicine continued to develop Medical Literature Analysis and Retrieval System, MEDLARS made it practical to produce specialized bibliographies in toxicology and other fields. One early product was the groundbreaking Toxicology Information Program. In 1968, at the suggestion of Cummings and other NLM leaders, Congress authorized the establishment of the Lister Hill Center for Biomedical Communications at NLM, which would conduct research and development of information systems, and develop and demonstrate methods for continuing education of workers in the health professions. The new center developed and tested an online system for MEDLARS—MEDLINE—which allowed users to enter search requests from remote locations over Teletypewriter Exchange lines. The LHC also experimented with medical education via interactive television links and demonstrated how communications satellites could be used for remote consultations and classes. During these years, NLM also began converting all of its catalog records to machine-readable form and refined its Medical Subject Headings (MeSH) indexing system, which was soon adopted by most medical libraries. Cummings also commissioned a history of the library, History of the National Library of Medicine: the nation’s treasury of medical knowledge by Wyndham Miles, published in 1982.

One of Cummings' early successes was the Medical Library Assistance Act (MLAA) of 1965, legislation of vital concern to health sciences librarians. . He enlisted the support of Senator Lister Hill of Alabama and other influential leaders and, in little more than a year, the Act became a reality. Its influence on the medical library profession has been profound: it was the basis for the National Network of Libraries of Medicine (NN/LM), a system of 5,800 libraries in all US states and territories, and the District of Columbia. Through the MLAA, thousands of institutions and individuals have received grant support for library resources, training, research and publications.

Cummings retired as Director on September 30, 1983, but immediately assumed new duties as Director Emeritus. His new responsibilities included organizing and classifying the John Shaw Billings Papers and assisting the Library's International Program activities in the wake of Mary Corning's retirement. In 1984 Cummings acted as a consultant to and member of the Council on Library Resources' Board of Directors, and won the 1984 Miles Conrad Award. He returned to teaching as Distinguished Professor at Georgetown University School of Medicine from 1986 to 1990.

Martin Cummings died September 1, 2011, in Sarasota, Florida.

== Awards and honors ==
Cummings received over thirty awards, fellowships, and honorary degrees. Awards include Rockefeller Public Service Award, Modern Medicine Distinguished Achievement Award, and the Abraham Horowitz Award of the Pan American Health Organization. He was a fellow of the American College of Medical Informatics, the Medical Library Association, and the Royal College of Physicians. In addition, he received honorary degrees from Bucknell University, University of Nebraska, Emory University, Georgetown University, the Karolinska Institute, the Academy of Medicine of Lodz, Poland, and Duke University. .

== Timeline ==
- 1941 B.S., Bucknell University
- 1942-1944 U.S. Army
- 1944 M.D., Duke University
- 1944-1947 Internship and Residency, Boston Marine Hospital
- 1944-1946 Resident, Tuberculosis Grasslands Hospital, Valhalla, NY
- 1946 Received specialized training in bacteriology and tuberculosis, Michigan State Health Department and the State Serum Institute of Denmark
- 1946-1949 Commissioned Officer, U.S. Public Health Service
- 1947-1949 Director, Tuberculosis Evaluation Laboratory, Communicable Disease Center, Atlanta, GA.Treated tuberculosis in veterans, Lawson Veterans Administration Hospital
- 1948-1953 Instructor through Associate Professor of Medicine, Emory University School of Medicine
- 1949-1953 Chief, Tuberculosis Section and Director Tuberculosis Research Laboratory, Veterans Administration Hospital, Atlanta, GA
- 1953-1959 Director, Research Services, Veterans Administration, Washington, D.C.; Lecturer of Microbiology, George Washington University School of Medicine
- 1958-1959 Chairman, Committee on Medical Research, National Tuberculosis Association
- 1958-1960 Chairman, Panel Sarcoidosis National Research Council, National Academy of Sciences
- 1959-1961 Professor and Chairman, Department of Microbiology, University of Oklahoma
- 1961-1963 Chief, Office of International Research, National Institute of Health (NIH)
- 1963-1964 Associate Director for Research Grants, NIH
- 1964-1983 Director, National Library of Medicine, NIH
- 1965 Medical Library Assistance Act
- 1968 Williams & Wilkins Co. v. United States of America
- 1980 Dedication of the Lister Hill National Center for Biomedical Communications
- 1984 Director Emeritus, NIH, National Library of Medicine (NLM)
- 1984 Consultant and Member, Board of Directors, Council on Library Resources
- 1986-1990 Distinguished Professor, Georgetown University School of Medicine
