= Susan Cummings (heiress) =

American heiress (born 1962)

Susan Cummings (born July 21, 1962, in Monte Carlo, Monaco) is an American heiress, best known for killing her boyfriend in 1997. She had been charged with homicide, but subsequently convicted of voluntary manslaughter only. She was released after serving 57 days.

== Biography ==
Cummings and her fraternal twin sister, Diana, are the only children of billionaire arms dealer Samuel Cummings. After the family moved to the United States, Samuel Cummings bought his daughters a lavish estate in Warrenton, Virginia, named Ashland Farms. It was here that Cummings shot Roberto Villegas on September 7, 1997.

Cummings sold the 340-acre (1.4 km^{2}) Ashland Farm estate on the edge of Warrenton in Fauquier County, Virginia for $4.9 million in 2004. She and her twin sister Diana moved to the 450-acre (1.8 km^{2}) LeBaron Farm in Culpeper County, Virginia. Their manor house, designed by the firm of Versaci Neumann Partners, won recognition in the 2006 Washingtonian Residential Design awards.

== Killing ==
Cummings had been in a relationship with Argentine polo player Roberto Villegas, who had emigrated to the U.S. in 1991. It was common for Argentine polo players to be recruited onto teams owned by wealthy landowners. The players would also be supplied with horses and accommodation.

Cummings met Villegas in 1995 and by 1996 the relationship had gotten more intense. He forwent returning to Florida for the polo season to help her on her farm. Cummings never paid Villegas for his work; however, she did pay his rent and costs for the horses he owned that he kept on her farm. Cummings had a lot of control over Villegas due to his not having a real income. By mid 1997, strains on the relationship were starting to show.

On the day of his death, Villegas was to play in a polo tournament representing Argentina. He left his apartment and traveled to Cummings's farm (where he also stored his gear). At 9 in the morning, Cummings shot Villegas four times in the second kitchen of the main house.

She told the 911 dispatcher and police that he had turned abusive towards her, threatening her with a knife. Villegas was found with a knife crossing his arm. Cummings had cuts on her arm, which police suspected were self-inflicted. She was arrested on charges of homicide. She was represented by Blair Howard. Howard's law firm claims he is one of the best ten lawyers in the country.

Cummings was convicted on May 13, 1998, of voluntary manslaughter in the death of Villegas, and was sentenced to 60 days in jail and ordered to pay $2,500. She was released after serving 57 days.

== In film and media ==
In 2002, this case was the focus of an episode of Dominick Dunne's Power, Privilege, and Justice. Entitled "A Scandal in Hunt County," this was the third episode of Season One.

In 2004, Lisa Pulitzer wrote a book on the case called A Woman Scorned.

A Biography Channel program about the case included an interview with a young Tareq Salahi, who was a friend of Roberto Villegas.

April 26, 2017 The Podcast "Small town Murder" Episode 15 "An Heiress & A Brutal Murder in Warrenton, Virginia" was done about the case.

Susan Cummings' case was featured in an episode of Behind Mansion Walls, and on the Investigation Discovery channel program Vanity Fair Confidential, season 2, episode 8, entitled "Love's Deadly Harness".
