= Jack Cummings (baseball) =

American baseball player (1904-1962)

- Catcher and pinch hitter
- Born: April 1, 1904; Pittsburgh, Pennsylvania
- Died: October 5, 1962 (aged 58); West Mifflin, Pennsylvania
- Batted: Right Threw: Right

MLB debut
- September 11, 1926, for the New York Giants

Last MLB appearance
- July 18, 1929, for the Boston Braves

MLB statistics (through 1929)
- Batting average: .341
- Hits: 45
- Runs batted in: 28
- Home runs: 4
- Stats at Baseball Reference

Teams
- New York Giants (1926–1929); Boston Braves (1929)

John William Cummings (April 1, 1904 in Pittsburgh, Pennsylvania – October 5, 1962 in West Mifflin, Pennsylvania), was a Major League Baseball player who played catcher for the Boston Braves and New York Giants from 1926 to 1929.

In 89 games over 4 seasons, Cummings posted a .341 batting average (45-for-132) with 15 runs, 4 home runs and 28 RBI.
