= Richard D. Cummings =

American biochemist

- Education: University of Montevallo, Alabama (B.S.), Johns Hopkins University (Ph.D.)
- Known for: Co-founder of glycomics and glycobiology
- Scientific career
- Fields: Glycoscience
- Institutions: University of Oklahoma, Washington University in St. Louis, Beth Israel Deaconess Medical Center and Harvard Medical School; Emory University School of Medicine

Richard D. Cummings is an American biochemist who is the S. Daniel Abraham Professor of Surgery at Beth Israel Deaconess Medical Center (BIDMC) and Harvard Medical School in Boston, Massachusetts. He is also the chief of the division of surgical sciences within the department of surgery. He is the director of the Harvard Medical School Center for Glycoscience, director of the National Center for Functional Glycomics, and founder of the Glycomics Core at BIDMC. Cummings was previously the William Patterson Timmie Professor and chair of the department of biochemistry at Emory University School of Medicine in Atlanta, Georgia. He is a Fellow of the American Association for the Advancement of Science.

== Education ==
Cummings graduated from Isabella High School near Maplesville, Alabama, and received his B.S. in biology and chemistry from the University of Montevallo in Montevallo, Alabama. He received his Ph.D. in biology (biochemistry) from The Johns Hopkins University in Baltimore, Maryland, where he trained with Stephen A. Roth, and was a postdoctoral fellow in the division of hematology/oncology at Washington University School of Medicine, where he trained with Stuart A. Kornfeld.

== Career and research ==
Cummings was professor of biochemistry and molecular biology at the University of Georgia in Athens from 1983-1992 and associate director of the Complex Carbohydrate Research Center.

Cummings was the Ed Miller Endowed Chair in Molecular Biology, the George Lynn Cross Professor in Biochemistry, and professor of biochemistry and molecular biology at the University of Oklahoma Health Sciences Center, College of Medicine, in Oklahoma City, Oklahoma from 1992 to 2006. He was the founder in 1999 of the Oklahoma Center for Medical Glycobiology.

In 1988, Cummings was a founder of ELA Technologies, Inc. in Athens, Georgia, that specialized in developing uses of bioluminescent proteins in high-sensitivity detection assays.

Cummings was a co-founder in 2002, with Rodger P. McEver and Richard Alvarez, of Selexys Pharmaceuticals Corporation, where he initially served as president and chief scientific officer. Selexys was based in Oklahoma City, Oklahoma and developed treatments for inflammatory disorders. On November 21, 2016, it was announced that Selexys was purchased by Novartis, following receipt of results of a Phase II trial evaluating the use of SelG1, an anti-P-selectin antibody, in the reduction of vaso-occlusive pain crises in patients with sickle cell disease (SCD). Crizanlizumab was approved by the FDA in 2019 to reduce frequency of pain crises in individuals living with sickle cell disease.

Cummings was a co-founder in 2014 of Tetherex Pharmaceuticals, a spinoff of Selexys in Oklahoma City, that is developing novel therapeutics targeting cell adhesion proteins in inflammatory and oncologic diseases. Cummings was a co-founder of GanNA Bio in 2021, which was acquired by ReNAgade Therapeutics in 2024. In 2025, Cummings co-founded VTE Therapeutics, which is developing glycopeptide therapeutics targeting the P-selectin/PSGL-1 pathway for cancer-associated venous thromboembolism.

=== Research ===
Cummings' research, which has been funded by the National Institutes of Health since 1984, has focused on the biochemical and molecular regulation of cellular metabolism and function. His work emphasizes the roles of glycoconjugates in cell adhesion and cell signaling. In his biochemical studies, he is exploring the fundamental pathways of glycoconjugate biosynthesis and alterations in biosynthesis in human and animal diseases. He is also exploring the roles of proteins and lectins that recognize glycans, as well as anti-glycan antibodies, in biological pathways and disease, including inflammation, autoimmunity, infectious diseases, and cancer.

Cummings has over 500 peer-reviewed publications in the field. Among his discoveries are the immunogenic glycans in parasitic helminths, the nature of the sulfated and glycosylated ligand PSGL-1 for selectins, the molecular chaperone COSMC (C1GalT1C1) that regulates T-synthase activity and consequently O-glycosylation pathways, and the roles of glycans in regulating leukocyte trafficking.

== Appointments and awards ==
Cummings has won the Society for Glycobiology's Karl Meyer Award (2008).

Cummings is an elected Fellow of the American Association for the Advancement of Science (2014), and a past president of the Society for Glycobiology (2001).

In 2008, Cummings received the Karl Meyer Award from the Society for Glycobiology and in 2019 he received the IGO Award from the International Glycoconjugate Organization, in recognition of his contributions to glycosciences. In 2025, Cummings received the Tamio Yamakawa Award from the Japan Consortium for Glycobiology and Glycotechnology (JCGG) in recognition of his significant contributions to glycobiology.

Cummings is the chair of the steering committee for the Consortium of Functional Glycomics and the director of the National Center for Functional Glycomics, which relocated in 2015 from Emory to BIDMC/HMS. Cummings is also co-director of the Human Glycome Project, a world-wide effort to identify and functionally characterize the components of the human glycome.

== Publications ==
Cummings is a co-editor of Essentials of Glycobiology, the first textbook in the field of glycobiology. Cummings was also the artwork editor for the textbook and prepared most of the illustrations. Cummings is also a co-editor of Handbook of Glycomics, which provides a comprehensive overview of the emerging field of glycomics, and a co-editor of Galectins: Methods and Protocols. In addition, Cummings currently has 32 US Patents in the field of biotechnology and glycobiology.
