= Jeffrey Cummings =

American judge (born 1962)

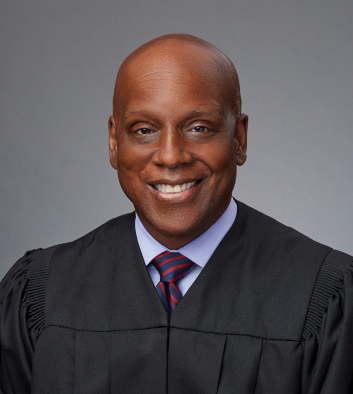

Judge of the United States District Court for the Northern District of Illinois
- Incumbent
- Assumed office October 10, 2023
- Appointed by: Joe Biden
- Preceded by: Seat established

Magistrate Judge of the United States District Court for the Northern District of Illinois
- In office February 1, 2019 – October 10, 2023
- Preceded by: Michael T. Mason
- Succeeded by: Jeannice Williams Appenteng

Personal details
- Born: Jeffrey Irvine Cummings; 1962 (age 63–64) Fort Wayne, Indiana, U.S.
- Education: Michigan State University (BA); Northwestern University (JD)

Jeffrey Irvine Cummings (born 1962) is an American lawyer from Illinois, who has served as a United States district judge of the United States District Court for the Northern District of Illinois since 2023. He previously served as a United States magistrate judge of the same court from 2019 to 2023.

== Education ==
Cummings received a Bachelor of Arts, with high honors, from Michigan State University in 1984. He then received a Juris Doctor from Northwestern University Pritzker School of Law, cum laude, in 1987, and was inducted into the Order of the Coif.

== Career ==
Cummings served as a law clerk for Judge Ann Claire Williams of the United States District Court for the Northern District of Illinois from 1987 to 1989. From 1989 to 2019, he was an associate and ultimately a co-managing partner at Miner, Barnhill & Galland, P.C. in Chicago, Illinois. Cummings served as counsel to Barack Obama from 1996 to his senate election in 2004.

Cummings was sworn in as a magistrate judge on January 29, 2019. He assumed office on February 1, 2019. Cummings is a former board member of Chicago Lawyers' Committee for Civil Rights Under Law.

=== Notable cases ===
In 1995, Cummings, alongside Barack Obama, represented ACORN, a voter registration organization that advocates for low- and moderate-income families in suing the State of Illinois in seeking to have it comply with the National Voter Registration Act of 1993.

In 2009, Cummings secured a $630,000 settlement for a class of black workers with Area Erectors, Inc., who alleged termination based on race.

=== Notable rulings ===
As a magistrate judge in 2020, Cummings ruled that Illinois Governor J. B. Pritzker would not be required to sit for a deposition as part of a discrimination case against his 2018 campaign.

In 2021, Cummings ordered the pretrial release of Jim Bob Elliott, a member of the group the Proud Boys, who was arrested for his participation of the January 6 United States Capitol attack.

=== Federal judicial service ===
In December 2021, Cummings was recommended to the president by Illinois Senators Dick Durbin and Tammy Duckworth. On January 18, 2023, President Joe Biden announced his intent to nominate Cummings to serve as a United States district judge of the United States District Court for the Northern District of Illinois. On January 31, 2023, his nomination was sent to the Senate. President Biden nominated Cummings to a new seat. On February 15, 2023, a hearing on his nomination was held before the Senate Judiciary Committee. On April 20, 2023, his nomination was reported out of committee by a 12–9 vote. On September 12, 2023, the United States Senate invoked cloture on his nomination by a 51–44 vote. Later that day, his nomination was confirmed by a 50–45 vote. He received his judicial commission on October 10, 2023. He was sworn in on October 26, 2023.

== See also ==
- List of African American jurists
- List of African American federal judges

Legal offices
New seat	Judge of the United States District Court for the Northern District of Illinois; 2023–present	Incumbent
