= William Cummings =

William Cummings may refer to:

- William Cummings (Australian politician) (1803–1878), New South Wales politician
- William Hayman Cummings (1831–1915), English musician
- Candy Cummings (William Arthur Cummings, 1848–1924), U.S. baseball player
- William Cummings (athlete) (1858–1919), Scottish athlete
- William Cummings (rugby union) (1889–1955), New Zealand rugby union player
- William Thomas Cummings (1903–1945), Maryknoll mission priest and U.S. military chaplain

== See also ==
- Bill Cummings (disambiguation)
- William Cumming (disambiguation)
