= George Cummings (cricketer) =

New Zealand cricketer

Personal information
- Full name: George Buck Cummings
- Born: 21 September 1882; Dunedin, Otago, New Zealand
- Died: 30 December 1943 (aged 61); Auckland, New Zealand
- Relatives: Edwin Cummings (brother)

Domestic team information
- Years: Team
- 1902/03–1904/05: Otago
- 1907/08–1922/23: Auckland
- Source: ESPNcricinfo, 8 May 2016

George Buck Cummings (21 September 1882 – 30 December 1943) was a New Zealand cricketer. He played first-class cricket for Otago and Auckland between the 1902–03 and 1922–23 seasons.

Cummings was born at Dunedin in 1882 and was the older brother of Edwin Cummings who also played for Otago. He worked as a warehouseman. He made his senior debut for Otago in the Christmas Day fixture against Canterbury in 1902. He played four matches for Otago, including one against a touring English team led by Lord Hawke in February 1903. Between the 1907–08 season and 1922–23 he played occasionally for Auckland, making a total of 10 first-class appearances for the team. He scored a total of 495 runs and took eight wickets in his 14 first-class matches.

Cummings died at Auckland in December 1943. He was aged 61.
