= Frank Cummings =

Australian rower

Personal information
- Nationality: Australian
- Born: Frank Mark Cummings; 31 March 1891 Serviceton, Victoria
- Died: 11 November 1954 (aged 63) Murray Bridge, South Australia

Sport
- Sport: Rowing
- Club: Murray Bridge Rowing Club

Achievements and titles
- National finals: King's Cup 1922-23

Frank Mark Cummings (31 March 1891 – 11 November 1954) was a rower who represented Australia at the 1924 Summer Olympics in Paris.

== War service ==
Pre-war, Cummings was a storeman. He enlisted in the AIF aged 24 in August 1915. He joined the 32 Bttn. in their 3rd reinforcement and embarked from Adelaide on HMAT A28 Militiades in February 1916. On the Western Front, he was promoted to Corporal and he served with the 32nd Bttn Cummings was wounded twice during World War I. In May 1917, surgeons had to remove bomb splinters from his back and legs after he had been sent on patrol to determine whether the Germans were withdrawing from the Hindenburg Line. A year later he suffered severe burns after a mustard gas attack. He returned to Australia in December 1918. Later in life, he would use a wheelchair due to his war wounds.

== Club and state rowing ==
Post-war Cummings was employed as a fireman on the South Australian Railways and in 1920 he joined the Murray Bridge Rowing Club where his brother Robert was the coxswain of the club's senior men's eight. The Murray Bridge Rowing Club men's eight was the dominant Australian club eight of the 1920s. They had won the South Australian state championship from 1920 to 1923 and for the four years from 1920 to 1923, they were selected in-toto as the South Australian men's eight to contest the King's Cup at the Australian Interstate Regatta. Frank Cummings secured the seven seat in the Murray Bridge eight of 1922 and rowed in those South Australian King's Cup victories of 1922 and 1923.

== International representative rowing ==
In 1924 with South Australia continuing to dominate Australian eights rowing, their claim for national Olympic selection could not be denied and after winning a test event raced on Port Adelaide in March 1924, Cummings and the South Australian crew were selected in-toto to represent Australia as an eight at the 1924 Summer Olympics.

Funding was raised from the Murray Bridge Rowing Club, the South Australian Rowing Association and the general public of South Australia. The crew were nicknamed "the Murray Cods". Unlike the 1912 Olympic eight, the Murray Cods were not invited to race in lead-up at the Henley Royal Regatta and in 2000 Ted Thomas jnr a crew member's son, asserted that this was because the eight was crewed by working-class men other than the stroke Bill Sladden It's undisputed that tour funds were scarce and on arrival in France, the crew had to row their shell 60 km to their training base; that on tour some of the crew (including Cummings) busked as musicians to raise pocket money; and that on race day they first rowed their shell 26 miles from their boatshed to the Olympic course. Their equipment was also sub-par as they rowed with their oars turning in out-rigged poppets rather than in swiveling gates as had become the norm by 1924.

In the Olympic regatta, with Cummings in the seven seat, the Australian eight finished second behind Italy in their heat then finished third in the repechage and didn't advance to the final.

Frank Cummings continued on as a first-class oarsman after the Olympics. He was again seated at seven in the South Australian representative eight's King's Cup campaign of 1925 (fourth place).
