= Patsy Touhey =

Irish-American piper

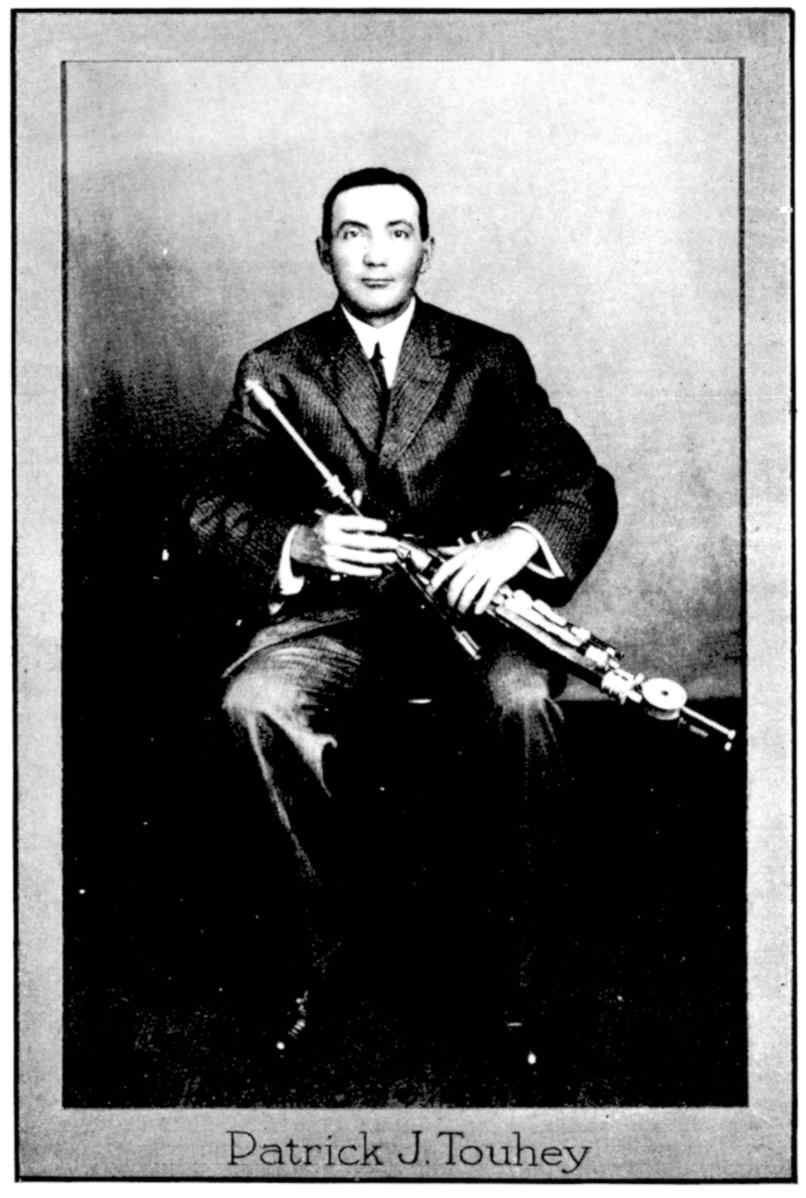
Portrait of Touhey

Patrick J. Touhey (26 February 1865 – 10 January 1923) was a celebrated player of the uilleann pipes. His innovative technique and phrasing, his travels back and forth across America to play on the variety and vaudeville stage, and his recordings made his style influential among Irish-American pipers. He can be seen as the greatest contributor to a distinctive American piping style.

Recordings made of Tuohy in the 1900s have been digitised and made available on the ITMA website as well as the Dunn Family Collection site of the Ward Irish Music Archives.

== Life ==
"Patsy" Touhey was born 26 February 1865, near Loughrea, County Galway, Ireland. According to Captain Francis O'Neill in his seminal work "Irish Minstrels and Musicians" Touhey was the third generation of accomplished pipers stemming from his grandfather, Michael Twohill (the original spelling, b. ca. 1800), his father James (b. 1839) and his uncle Martin, who were considered accomplished players. The family arrived in Boston around 1868, and his father arranged for Touhey's instruction from Bartley Murphy of County Mayo. However at the age of ten Patsy lost his father and awhile later laid the pipes aside.

In his late teens he strayed into a Bowery music hall where John Eagan, the "White Piper" of Galway, was engaged. Enthralled by Eagan's virtuosity he took up the instrument again, and under the instruction of Eagan and Billy Taylor of Philadelphia soon became a master.

Touhey and Eagan toured the northeastern United States with "Harrigan's Double Hibernian Co., Irish and American Tourists" in 1885 and 1886. This was Touhey's apparent introduction to theatrical life. Harrigan's company starred Jerry Cohan, the father of George M. Cohan, later a famous songwriter and showman. Despite a persistent legend, there is no evidence that Touhey played publicly for the step-dancing of George M. Cohan, who would have been seven or eight years old at the time. Between 1886 and 1895 Touhey appeared in several theatre productions including "Inshavogue" and "The Ivy Leaf." At the 1893 World's Columbian Exposition in Chicago he played at the Irish Village, one of two rival Irish pavilions, and was later engaged for the 1904 World's Fair in St. Louis (Louisiana Purchase Exposition). From about 1896 until 1921 he played in vaudeville skits, trading jokes with his wife Mary and their on and off partner Charles Henry Burke. The shows included slapstick, low-brow gags, Irish nostalgia, and a piping finale to which Mary Touhey danced.

Chicago Police Chief Francis O'Neill, the prominent compiler of Irish dance tunes, called him, "the genial wizard of the Irish pipers . . . A stranger to jealousy, his comments are never sarcastic or unkind, neither does he display any tendency to monopolize attention in company when other musicians are present.”

Touhey lived on Bristow Street in the Bronx, New York City, from at least 1900 until 1908. He and Mary lived in rural East Haddam, Connecticut 1908–1919, then in Freeport, New York 1919–1922. In 1922 he moved back to the Bronx. He died on 10 January 1923, and is buried in St. Raymond's Cemetery in the Bronx.

== Playing style ==
Touhey played left-handed, in a mirror image of the typical position. He used concert-pitch instruments made by the Taylor brothers of Philadelphia. In performing dance music, he played fast but deviated from strict tempo to bring out the character of the tune. He used the regulators (three keyed pipes lying under the heel of the hand) not to keep the rhythm, but to emphasise the broader structure of the piece. He combined legato passages with "tight" (staccato) ornaments—runs, triplets and backstitching—as well as crans, all executed with the highest proficiency. However, he did not employ certain ornaments in common use today, such as raising the chanter off the knee to swell a note's volume and intensity. In these ways his style contrasts with the prominent influences on current piping who stayed in Ireland—Willie Clancy, Johnny Doran, Seamus Ennis, John Potts, and Leo Rowsome.

Most uilleann pipes have three drones and three regulators. Touhey's middle drone was replaced by a regulator with a single key that sounded an E-note, which would otherwise have been unavailable. Their current owner, Sean McKiernan, plays them here on YouTube.

Some surviving recordings show how Touhey often switched smoothly from a jig or slow air to a reel. Another unusual performance device was to play as an encore the well-known American piece "Turkey in the Straw", performed in piping style. "He takes the audience by storm," wrote Captain Francis O'Neill, "even when composed of mixed nationalities.”

His music can be heard on three 78 rpm sides recorded by Victor in 1919: two medleys of reels and one of jigs. A fourth medley comprising the Stack of Barley and other hornpipes was recorded but not released. Two of his 78 recordings may be heard on the two-volume CD The Wheels of the World, which focuses on early recordings of Irish-American musicians.

An earlier negotiation with Edison had fallen through over money, but as early as 1901 Touhey advertised a list of 150 tunes and recorded the cylinders one by one at home, filling orders at $10 per dozen. Several dozen of these survive, and more examples of his playing can be heard on cylinders made by Captain O'Neill. The two sources can be differentiated as either Touhey or O'Neill's voice introduces the player and the piece.

It was one of O'Neill's cylinders that prompted the Gaelic scholar Father Richard Henebry to declare, "[Touhey's performance] has the life of a reel and the terrible pathos of a caoine. It represents to me human man climbing the empyrean heights, and when he had almost succeeded, then tumbling, tumbling down to hell, and expressing his sense of eternal failure on the way. The Homeric ballads and the new Brooklyn Bridge are great, but Patsy Touhey's rendering of 'The Shaskeen Reel' is a far bigger achievement.”

Some others, notably Brother Gildas O'Shea of Kerry, disdained Touhey's style as outside the tradition. Asked whether Touhey's recordings had influenced his own playing, Gildas replied, "No, I was learning the pipes at the time." However, generally pipers were in awe of Touhey's playing; Séamus Ennis, writing in the liner notes of Dublin fiddler Tommy Potts's Liffey Banks LP, said that he and his father considered Touhey's playing "hyper-phenomenal," and that he considered Touhey "the best of the men who came before my father."

Touhey left no children but several pupils, including Michael Carney and Michael Morris. His style can be heard in the playing of many others, most of whom were either born in or spent considerable time in the United States, including Michael Gallagher, Paddy Lavin, Tom Busby, Tom Ennis, Hugh McCormick, Eddie Mullaney, Joe Shannon and Andy Conroy. Tom Busby was a student of Carney's and described the style of these pipers in various articles and letters printed in An Píobaire, the newsletter of Na Píobairí Uilleann. This close-fingered way of playing Busby always described as the Connaught style of piping. The late Thomas Standeven studied with Busby, among others, and he in turn passed on his learning to many students, some of whom are well known in piping circles, and who went on to teach others in their turn. The style of these American-based players differs in various ways from that of players recorded in Ireland, but the possibly unique features of an American style are hard to discern now, due to the lack of recorded evidence.

== Discography ==
Solo album

- "The Piping of Patsy Touhey" (2005)

Various artists including Patsy Touhey

- "A New Dawn" (1999)
- "The Wheels of the World Vol 1" (2000)
- "The Wheels of the World Vol 2" (2000)
- "Farewell To Ireland" (2005)
- "The Francis O'Neill Cylinders: Thirty-two Recordings of Irish Traditional Music in America circa 1904" (2010)
