= Cumming (surname) =

Cumming is an Irish surname (Gaelic: Ó Comáin), or Scottish origin akin to Scottish Gaelic: Cuimeinich.

People bearing the surname include:

- Alan Cumming (born 1965), Scottish actor, director, producer, writer and presenter
- Allan Cumming (born 1996), South African hammer thrower
- Alexander Cumming (1733–1814), Scottish watchmaker and inventor
- Alexander Charles Cumming (1880–1940), Australian-born chemist and author
- Alfred Cumming (governor) (1802–1873), Governor of the U.S. Territory of Utah from 1858 to 1861
- Alfred Cumming (general) (1829–1910), Confederate General in American Civil War, nephew of the above
- Allan Cumming (born 1996), South African hammer thrower
- Andrew Cumming (fl. 1967–2004), retired British Army major-general
- Anne Cumming, pen name of British translator, public relations officer, polyamorist and writer Felicity Anne Cumming Mason (1917–1993)
- Arthur Cumming (skater) (1889–1914), British figure skater
- Arthur Cumming (Royal Navy officer) (1817–1893), Royal Navy admiral
- Arthur Edward Cumming (1896–1971), British Army officer and Victoria Cross recipient
- Bobby Cumming (born 1955), Scottish footballer
- Bruce Cumming (1916–1968), South African cricketer
- Catherine Cumming, 21st century Australian politician
- Charles Cumming (born 1971), Scottish writer of spy fiction
- Charlotte Gordon Cumming (born 1958), Scottish singer/songwriter
- Craig Cumming (born 1975), New Zealand cricketer
- David Cumming (1910–1993), Scottish footballer
- David Cumming (footballer, born 1900), Scottish footballer
- David Robert Sime Cumming, Scottish engineer
- Derwas Cumming (1891–1918), Australian rules footballer and soldier
- Donald Cumming (born 1981), American singer and songwriter
- Donigan Cumming (born 1947), American-born Canadian visual artist
- Dorothy Cumming (1894–1983), Australian silent film actress
- Douglas Cumming (born 1970), Canadian financial economist
- Emma Cumming (born 1998), New Zealand racing cyclist
- Eric Cumming (1923–1964), Australian rules footballer and sprinter
- Fiona Cumming (1937–2015), Scottish Dr. Who television director
- George Cumming (politician) (1752–1834), Scottish Member of Parliament
- George Cumming (golfer) (1879–1950), Canadian golfer and golf course architect
- Hanway Robert Cumming (1867–1921), British Army general killed by the IRA in the Clonbanin ambush
- Henry Harford Cumming (1799–1866), American businessman
- Henry John Cumming (1771–1856), British Army general
- Hugh S. Cumming (1869–1948), Surgeon General of the United States
- Isaac Cumming (born 1998), Australian rules footballer
- James Cumming (disambiguation)
- Jamie Cumming (born 1999), English football goalkeeper
- Jennifer Lyn Cumming (born 1970) Edmonton's top escort, Leos list most active listing
- John Cumming (clergyman) (1807–1881), Scottish clergyman
- John Cumming (Australian footballer) (born 1952), Australian footballer
- John Cumming (Scottish footballer) (1930–2008), Scottish footballer
- Joseph Cumming, Scholar of Islamic and Christian thought
- Joseph George Cumming (1812–1868), English geologist and archaeologist
- Kenneth Cumming (1916–1988), Western Australian cricketer
- Laura Cumming, British journalist, editor, writer and art critic
- Peter Cumming (fl. 1994–present), Australian politician
- Peter Hood Ballantine Cumming, mayor of Rumson, New Jersey
- Primrose Cumming (1915–2004), British children's book author
- Robert Cumming (art historian) (born 1945), professor of the history of art
- Robert Cumming (artist) (1943–2021), American painter, sculptor, photographer and printmaker
- Robert Denoon Cumming (1916–2004), Canadian-American philosopher and historian of philosophy
- Ronald Cumming (1900–1982), Scotland international rugby union player
- Rose Cumming (1887–1968), American eccentric interior designer
- Thomas Cumming (1714–1774), American merchant in West Africa
- Thomas W. Cumming (1814 or 1815–1855), American businessman and politician
- William Cumming (disambiguation)

== See also ==
- General Cumming (disambiguation)
- Gordon-Cumming, a list of people with the surname
- Charles Cumming-Bruce (1790–1875), Scottish Conservative politician
- John Graham-Cumming, British computer programmer
- Mansfield Smith-Cumming (1859–1923), British spymaster
- Clan Cumming
- Cummings (surname)
