= 1830 in literature =

This article contains information about the literary events and publications of 1830.

== Events ==
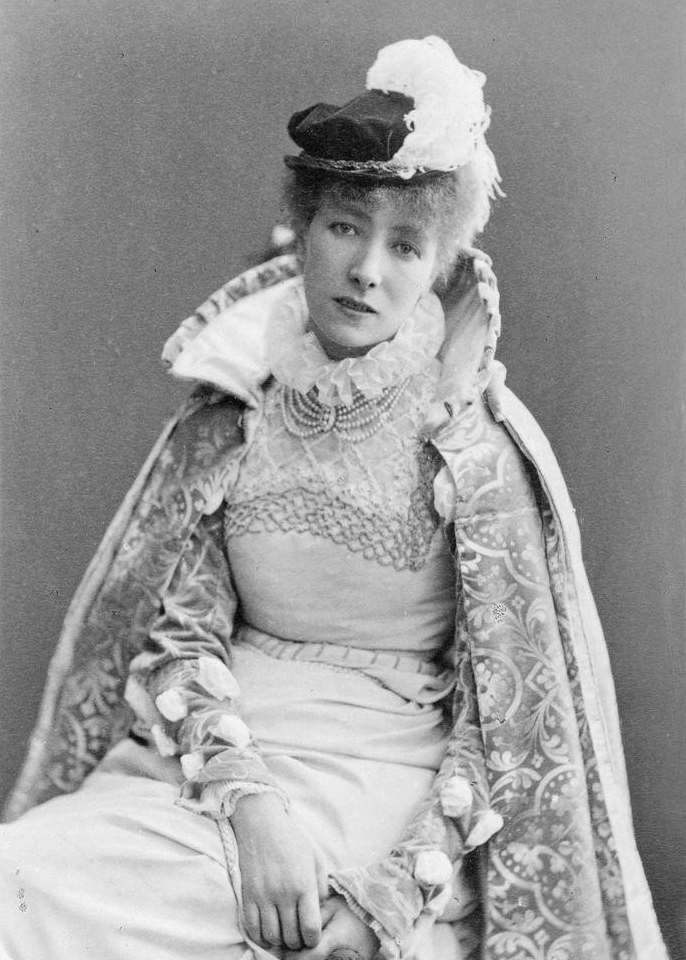
Sarah Bernhardt as Doña Sol in Hernani(1877)

- February – The house of the Danish–German historian Barthold Georg Niebuhr in Bonn burns down, but most of his books and manuscripts are saved. France's July Revolution in the same year was a terrible blow to Niebuhr, and filled him with the most dismal anticipations of the future of Europe.
- February 25 – The première of Victor Hugo's play Hernani in Paris elicits protests from an audience seeing it as an attack on Classicism.
- March 26 – Joseph Smith's Book of Mormon is published in Palmyra, New York. The manuscript of the book was completed in June 1829. The printer E. B. Grandin published the Book of Mormon in Palmyra, New York. It would go on sale in his bookstore on March 26, 1830. Smith said that he returned the book's source, the golden plates, to the angel Moroni upon the publication of the book.
- May 22 – Amos Bronson Alcott marries Abby May at King's Chapel, Boston, Massachusetts.
- May 24 – Sarah Josepha Hale's Poems for Our Children, including "Mary's Lamb", with the verse "Mary Had a Little Lamb", is published by Marsh, Capen & Lyon in Boston, Massachusetts.
- July 1 – Edgar Allan Poe matriculates as a cadet at the United States Military Academy, West Point.
- July 26–29 – July Revolution in France; writer Alexandre Dumas is active for the revolutionaries.
- July or later – Victor Cousin is elected to the Académie française to replace Joseph Fourier.
- August – François-René de Chateaubriand sacrifices his political career by refusing to swear an oath of allegiance to Louis-Philippe, and retires to write his memoirs.
- August 25 – Belgian Revolution breaks out; Flemish novelist Hendrik Conscience takes the side of the revolutionaries.
- December – Elizabeth Vestris becomes the first female actor-manager in the history of London theatre by leasing the Olympic Theatre in Drury Lane where she presents extravaganzas and burlesques.
- unknown dates
  - James Mill becomes head of the London office of the British East India Company.
  - The English publishers Bradbury and Evans are established as printers by William Bradbury and Frederick Mullet Evans.
  - Edward Moxon begins his own publishing business in London.
  - The famous opening line of Edward Bulwer-Lytton's (anonymous) novel, Paul Clifford, published this year, begins: "It was a dark and stormy night; the rain fell in torrents — except at occasional intervals, when it was checked by a violent gust of wind which swept up the streets (for it is in London that our scene lies), rattling along the housetops, and fiercely agitating the scanty flame of the lamps that struggled against the darkness."

== New books ==
=== Fiction ===
- Honoré de Balzac
  - La Maison du chat-qui-pelote
  - La Vendetta
  - Le Bal de Sceaux
  - Gobseck
- Lady Charlotte Bury
  - The Exclusives
  - The Separation
- Edward Bulwer-Lytton – Paul Clifford
- James Fenimore Cooper – The Water-Witch
- Nikolai Gogol – "St. John's Eve" («Вечер накануне Ивана Купала», Večer nakanune Ivana Kupala, short story)
- Catherine Gore – Women as They Are
- Thomas Colley Grattan – The Heiress of Bruges
- Maria Jane Jewsbury – The Three Histories
- John Neal — Authorship, a Tale
- Thomas Love Peacock – Crotchet Castle
- Anna Maria Porter – The Barony
- Catharine Maria Sedgwick – A Tale of Our Times
- Mary Shelley – The Fortunes of Perkin Warbeck
- Horace Smith – Walter Colyton
- Louisa Stanhope – The Corsair's Bride
- Stendhal – The Red and the Black (Le Rouge et le Noir)
- Princess Victoria – The Adventures of Alice Laselles (first published 2015)

=== Children ===
- Frederick Marryat – The King's Own
- Anna Maria Hall – Chronicles of a School-Room

=== Drama ===
- Henrik Hertz – Amor's Strokes of Genius (Amors Genistreger)
- Douglas William Jerrold – The Mutiny at the Nore
- Jovan Sterija Popović – Laža i Paralaža
- Aleksandr Pushkin – Little Tragedies (Маленькие трагедии, Malenkie tragedii)
  - The Stone Guest (Каменный гость, Kamenny gost)
  - Mozart and Salieri (Моцарт и Сальери, Mozart i Salieri)
  - The Miserly Knight (Скупой рыцарь, Skupoy rytsar)
  - A Feast in Time of Plague (Пир во время чумы, Pir vo vremya chumy)
- Sir Walter Scott (published, never performed)
  - Auchindrane
  - The Doom of Devorgoil

=== Poetry ===
- Oliver Wendell Holmes – "Old Ironsides"
- Alphonse de Lamartine – Harmonies poétiques et religieuses
- Richard Lower – Tom Cladpole's Jurney to Lunnon, told by himself, and written in pure Sussex doggerel by his Uncle Tim
- Alfred de Musset – Comtes d'Espagne et d'Italie
- Caroline Norton – The Undying One and Other Poems (includes "The Arab's Farewell to His Horse")
- Charles Augustin Sainte-Beuve – Les Consolations
- Alfred Tennyson – Poems, Chiefly Lyrical

=== Non-fiction ===
- Jeremy Bentham – Constitutional Code for All Nations
- William Cobbett – Rural Rides
- Humphry Davy (posthumous) – Consolations in Travel; or, The Last Days of a Philosopher
- Denis Diderot (posthumous) – La Promenade du sceptique
- Jacob Grimm – Hymnorum veteris ecclesiae XXVI. inter pretatio theodisca
- John Hughes, editor – The Boscobel Tracts
- Samuel Lee – Six Sermons on the Study of the Holy Scriptures, to Which are Annexed Two Dissertations
- Charles Lyell – Principles of Geology, vol. 1
- Thomas Moore – Letters and Journals of Lord Byron, with Notices of his Life
- Hermann, Fürst von Pückler-Muskau – Briefe eines Verstorbenen (4 volumes to 1831, Tour of a German Prince, 4 vols, 1831–32)
- Joseph Smith – The Book of Mormon
- Anonymous – The Seducing Cardinal

== Births ==
- January 2 – Henry Kingsley, English novelist (died 1876)
- January 28 – Martha Foster Crawford, American writer and missionary (died 1909)
- February 28 – James Payn, English novelist (died 1898)
- March 15 – Paul Heyse, German writer and Nobel Prize in Literature winner (died 1914)
- March 18 – Numa Denis Fustel de Coulanges, French historian (died 1889)
- March 25 – Frederick Greenwood, English novelist and man of letters (died 1909)
- April 6 – Eugène Rambert, Swiss poet and writer (died 1886)
- April 21 – Mary A. Brayton Woodbridge, American editor and reformer (died 1894)
- May 17 – Sarah Gibson Humphreys, American author and suffragist (died 1907)
- May 20 – Hector Malot, French writer (died 1907)
- July 22 – Richard Copley Christie, English scholar (died 1902)
- September 8 – Frédéric Mistral, French poet (died 1914)
- September 2 – Josefina Wettergrund, Swedish writer (died 1903)
- September 11 – Frances Freeling Broderip (née Hood), English children's writer (died 1878)
- October 15 – Helen Hunt Jackson, American writer and activist (died 1885)
- October 30 – Eliza Brightwen (née Elder), Scottish naturalist (died 1906)
- December 5 – Christina Rossetti, English poet (died 1894)
- December 10 – Emily Dickinson, American poet (died 1886)
- December 17 – Jules de Goncourt, French founder of Prix Goncourt (died 1870)
- unknown date – Mary Anna Needell (Mrs. J. H. Needell), English novelist (died 1922)

== Deaths ==
- January 17 or 30 – Wilhelm Waiblinger, German Romantic poet (born 1804)
- January 26 – Maria Petronella Woesthoven, Dutch poet (died 1760)
- February 15 – Prince Ioane of Georgia, Georgian encyclopedist (born 1768)
- February 20 – Robert Anderson, Scottish literary editor, biographer and critic (born 1750)
- February 25 – Henrietta Maria Bowdler, English author and expurgator (born 1750)
- March 29 – James Rennell, English historian and oceanographer (born 1742)
- April 16 – József Katona, Hungarian dramatist and poet (born 1791)
- August 6 – David Walker, African-American abolitionist (born 1785)
- August 20 – Vasily Pushkin, Russian poet (born 1766)
- September 18 – William Hazlitt, English essayist (born 1778)
- October 8 – Johann Gottfried Ebel, Prussian-born Swiss travel writer (born 1764)
- By November – Mary Diana Dods, Scottish writer known as "David Lyndsay", later "Walter Sholto Douglas" (born 1790)
- November 20 – Gustav von Ewers, German legal historian (born 1781)
- December 8 – Benjamin Constant, Swiss-born French liberal author (born 1767)
- December 31 – Stéphanie Félicité, comtesse de Genlis, French dramatist and writer on education (born 1746)

== Awards ==
- Newdigate Prize – George Kettilby Rickards

== Sources ==
- Hardy, Grant (2010). Understanding the Book of Mormon: A Reader's Guide. Oxford University Press. ISBN 978-0-19-973170-1. OL 24418834M. Wikidata Q123382112.
- Remini, Robert V. (2002). Joseph Smith. Penguin Lives. Viking Penguin. ISBN 978-0-7862-4375-4 – via Internet Archive.
