= Gordon-Cumming =

Gordon-Cumming is a surname. Notable people with the surname include:

- Catherine Rose Gordon-Cumming, maiden name of Katie Fforde (born 1952), British novelist
- Constance Gordon-Cumming (1837–1924), Scottish travel writer and painter
- Eliza Maria Gordon-Cumming (1795–1821), Scottish scientist
- Roualeyn George Gordon-Cumming (1820–1866), Scottish traveller and sport hunter
- William Gordon-Cumming (disambiguation), one of several people with the name

== See also ==
- Sir Charles Gordon-Cumming-Dunbar, 9th Baronet (1844–1916), Anglican priest
- Charlotte Gordon Cumming (born 1958), Scottish musician
- Gordon (surname)
- Cumming (surname)
