= Dave Cumming =

Dave Cumming may also refer to:

- David Cumming (1910–1993), English association footballer
- David Robert Sime Cumming (fl. 2010s–2020s), Scottish engineer
- Derwas Cumming (1891–1918), Australian rules footballer

== See also ==
- Dave Cummings (1940–2019), American pornographic actor
