= Walter Campbell of Shawfield =

Scottish landowner and advocate (1741–1816)

Rector of the University of Glasgow
- In office 1789–1791
- Preceded by: Adam Smith
- Succeeded by: Thomas Kennedy of Dunure

Sheriff-Depute of Kincardineshire
- In office 1767–1777

Personal details
- Born: 29 December 1741
- Died: 19 October 1816 (aged 74)
- Spouses: Eleanora Kerr (m. 1768; died 1785): Mary Nisbet Hay
- Relations: Daniel Campbell (grandfather); Walter F. Campbell (grandson); Eliza Gordon-Cumming (granddaughter); Francis Wemyss-Charteris, 9th Earl of Wemyss (grandson); Colin Campbell, 1st Baron Clyde (grandson)
- Children: John Campbell
- Parent(s): John Campbell; Lady Henrietta Cunningham

Walter Campbell, 3rd of Shawfield and Islay and 9th of Skipness (29 December 1741 – 19 October 1816) was a Scottish landowner, advocate and Rector of Glasgow University.

== Early life ==
Campbell was born on 29 December 1741 into the Skipness branch of Clan Campbell which descends from the 2nd Earl of Argyll. He was a son of John Campbell of Shawfield (1696–1746) and Lady Henrietta Cunningham, who married in 1735. His father had been previously married, without issue, to Lady Margaret Campbell (a daughter of Hugh Campbell, 3rd Earl of Loudoun and sister of John Campbell, 4th Earl of Loudoun). His older brothers were Daniel Campbell, 2nd of Shawfield (an MP for Lanarkshire who died unmarried in 1777) and John Campbell, 8th of Skipness.

His maternal grandparents were William Cunningham, 12th Earl of Glencairn and Lady Henrietta Stewart (second daughter of Alexander Stewart, 3rd Earl of Galloway and Lady Mary Douglas, a daughter of James Douglas, 2nd Earl of Queensberry). His cousins James and John both became Earls of Glencairn. His paternal grandparents were Margaret (née Leckie) Campbell (the daughter of John Leckie of Newlands) and Daniel Campbell, a follower of the Duke of Argyll who represented Inverary in the Scottish parliament from 1702 until the union (he was one of the commissioners who signed the treaty). He sat in the first Parliament of Great Britain and represented the Glasgow Burghs from 1716 to 1734. In 1711, he built Shawfield Mansion, his residence in Glasgow which became famous in connection with the Shawfield riots in 1725.

== Career ==
His father died in 1746, predeceasing his grandfather, who died in 1753. Therefore, Walter's elder brother Daniel was their grandfather's heir. When Daniel died, unmarried and without issue, in 1777, Walter inherited the estate and became 3rd of Shawfield and Laird of Islay, Scotland.

He qualified as an advocate in 1763 and was Sheriff-Depute of Kincardineshire from 1767 to 1777. He was recognised by Lord Lyon King of Arms, and matriculated his arms at the Lyon Court in 1777.

He was Rector of the University of Glasgow from 1789 to 1791.

== Personal life ==
Campbell was married twice. His marriage was to Eleanor Kerr (d. 1785) on 9 March 1768. She was a daughter of Robert Kerr of Newfield and Eleanora (née Nugent) Kerr. Her grandparents were Lord Charles Kerr (the second son of Robert Kerr, 1st Marquess of Lothian and Lady Jane Campbell, a daughter of Archibald Campbell, 1st Marquess of Argyll) and the former Janet Murray (eldest daughter of Sir David Murray of Stanhope, 2nd Baronet and Lady Anne Bruce, second daughter of Alexander Bruce, 2nd Earl of Kincardine). Together, Eleanor and Walter were the parents of:

- John Campbell, 4th of Islay and of Woodhall (1770–1809), who was an army officer and a Member of Parliament who married Lady Charlotte Bury, a daughter of John Campbell, 5th Duke of Argyll and Elizabeth Hamilton, 1st Baroness Hamilton of Hameldon.
- Agnes Campbell (1770–1800), who married John Macliver (parents of Colin Campbell, 1st Baron Clyde).
- Katherine Campbell (c. 1780–1855), who married Sir Charles Jenkinson, 10th Baronet, a cousin of Lord Liverpool, the Prime Minister from 1812 to 1827.
- Margaret Campbell (c. 1780–1850), who married Francis Douglas, 8th Earl of Wemyss.
- Robert Campbell, 10th of Skipness, who married Eugenia Josephine Wynne, daughter of Richard Wynne, in 1806.
- Colin Campbell of Ardpatrick (1787–1851), an Admiral in the Royal Navy who married Harriet Royds in 1826, a daughter of James Royds of Falinge.
- Walter Campbell (d. 1840), of Sunderland House on Islay, who married Mary Ann King, daughter of John King, in 1814, his daughter Eleanor Anne Campbell, married Sir Charles Trevelyan as his second wife.
- Daniel Campbell, who died young.
- Eleanor Campbell, who died unmarried.
- Harriet Campbell, who married Daniel Hamilton of Gikerscleugh (d. 1823).
- Glencairn Campbell, who married Francis Carter of Edgcott.
- Elizabeth Campbell (d. 1856), who married Stuart Moncrief of Thriepland, advocate general at Bombay.

He married, secondly, Mary (née Nisbet) Hay, the daughter of William Nisbet of Dirleton and Mary (née Hamilton) Nisbet. His wife, the widow of Major William Hay (who was himself the widower of Lady Catherine Hay, a daughter of John Hay, 4th Marquess of Tweeddale), was the sister and heiress of MP William Hamilton Nisbet (father of Mary Nisbet, who married Thomas Bruce, 7th Earl of Elgin). Together, Mary and Walter were the parents of:

- Mary Hamilton Campbell (1789–1885), (Note: Campbell's daughter, Mary Hamilton Campbell (1789–1885) inherited the Pencaitland estates in 1804 from her maternal uncle John Hamilton Nisbet of Pentcaitland; on her death she left these estates to Mary Georgina Constance Nisbet-Hamilton, the grand-daughter of her cousin Mary Hamilton Nisbet of Belhaven and Dirleton, Countess of Elgin and Kincardine.) who married James Ruthven, 7th Lord Ruthven of Freeland.
- Hamilton Campbell (c. 1790–1873), who married Robert Hamilton, 8th Lord Belhaven and Stenton.
- William Campbell (b. 1793), who died unmarried.

Campbell died on 19 October 1816.

=== Descendants ===
Through his son John, he was a grandfather of Walter Frederick Campbell, an MP for Argyllshire who inherited Islay in 1816 upon his grandfather's death. He was also the grandfather of John George Campbell (who married Ellen, a daughter of Sir Fitzwilliam Barrington, 10th Baronet), Eliza Maria Campbell (wife of Sir William Gordon-Cumming, 2nd Baronet) Eleanora Campbell (wife of Henry Paget, 2nd Marquess of Anglesey), Harriet Charlotte Campbell (wife of Charles Bury, 2nd Earl of Charleville), Emma Campbell (wife of William Russell, youngest son of Lord William Russell), Adelaide Campbell (wife of Lord Arthur Lennox), and Julia Campbell (wife of Peter Langford-Brooke, of Mere Hall).

Through his daughter Agnes, he was a grandfather of Colin Campbell, 1st Baron Clyde (born Colin Macliver) who was adopted by his uncle John after his parents death. He served as Commander-in-Chief, India from 1857 to 1861.

Through his daughter Katherine, he was a grandfather of Katherine Jenkinson (wife of Richard Samuel Guinness and mother of Adelaide Maria Guinness, wife of the first Earl of Iveagh) and Eleanor Jenkinson (wife of the 2nd Duc de Montebello).

Through his daughter Margaret, he was a grandfather of eight, including Lady Eleanor Charteris (who married her cousin, Walter Frederick Campbell), Francis Wemyss-Charteris, 9th Earl of Wemyss, and Lady Katherine Charteris Wemyss (who married George Grey, 8th Baron Grey of Groby).

Through his son Robert, he was a grandfather of Col. Walter William Thomas Beaujolois Campbell, 11th of Skipness (1807–1877), who lived at Skipness Castle and married Anna Henrietta Loring, a daughter of Lt.-Col. Robert Loring, in 1838.

Through his son Colin, he was a grandfather of Colin Glencairn Campbell (1812–1889), who married Octavia Helen Workman-Macnaghten, daughter of Sir Edmund Workman-Macnaghten, 2nd Baronet.
