= Constance Gordon-Cumming =

Scottish writer and painter

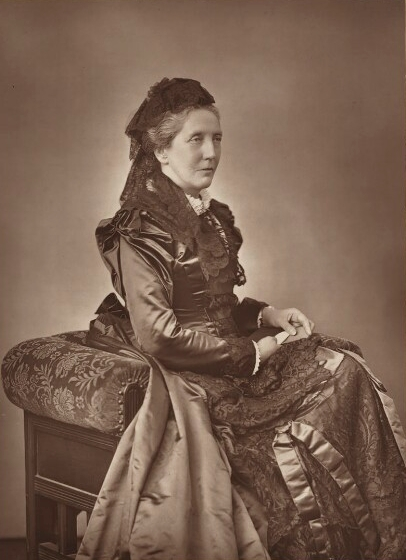
- Constance Frederica Gordon-Cumming (1896)
- Born: May 26, 1837; Altyre, Morayshire, Scotland
- Died: September 4, 1924 (aged 87)
- Resting place: Auchtertyre, near Crieff

Constance Frederica "Eka" Gordon-Cumming (26 May 1837 – 4 September 1924) was a Scottish travel writer and painter. Born into a wealthy family, she traveled around the world. She painted and described scenes and life as she saw them. She was a friend and influence of the travel writers and artists Marianne North and Isabella Bird.

== Family background ==
Constance came from a wealthy and socially well-connected family. Her grandfather, Sir Alexander Cumming, inherited the wealth of his wife.

In 1798 he was confirmed heir of his kinsman, Sir William Gordon and inherited the name and arms of Gordon of Gordonstoun.He also adopted the hyphenated double surname, though this was not consistently used by family members.

Her parents were Sir William Gordon Gordon-Cumming, 2nd Baronet, and Eliza Maria Gordon-Cumming, granddaughter of the Duke of Argyll. Eka was the aunt of Sir William Gordon-Cumming, 4th Baronet.

Her mother was interested in geology and was familiar with the works of Robert Murchison. Many of her family members were travelers, an uncle Charles Cumming-Bruce married the grand-daughter of the Nile explorer James Bruce of Kinnaird. Her brother Alexander had been Canada while another, Roualeyn had been Africa where he had been famous as a big-game hunter. Another brother John was a planter in Ceylon while William was a soldier in India. William wrote about his hunting in "Wild Men and Wild Beasts" (1871) dedicated to Col. Walter Campbell ("The Old Forest Ranger").

== Early life and education ==
Constance Frederica Gordon-Cumming was born 26 May 1837 at Altyre, the family estate near Forres, Scotland as the 12th of 15 children. Shortly after her birth, she was sent to family in Moy to avoid a scarlet fever outbreak at Altyre. The outbreak had recently killed two of her siblings: Walter Frederick and Constance. Her name was derived from the names of these siblings.

Constance remarked her sisters and herself and inherited their mother's artistic abilities and their spent time painting in watercolour and oil paints. Frequent visitors to the house provided additional artistic mentorship, including Sir Edwin Landseer and William Charles Ross.

A Swiss maid, Cherie, taught the children French.

Her mother died in 1842, a month after giving birth to her brother. After this, she went to live with her eldest sister in Northumberland. Her father remarried in 1846. In 1848, she began schooling at Hermitage Lodge near Fulham. She attended the school until 1853. A year after her graduation, her social and travel life began in earnest.

== Travel career ==
Constance's traveling began around 1866 when she was in Loch Ness where her terminally ill brother Roualeyn was being nursed by another sister. In 1868 she went on a painting tour with her half-brother Frederick to the Western Islands. She also took an invitation from her half-sister Emilia Sergison to visit India and after spending a year there she wrote In the Himalayas and on the Indian Plains (1884). This was followed by, twelve years of enchanting travel which followed would never have been dreamt of, for link by link that pleasant chain wove itself, as she described it.

Gordon-Cumming was a prolific travel writer and landscape painter who traveled the world, mostly in Asia and the Pacific. She painted over a thousand watercolors and worked with a motto to ‘never a day without at least one careful-colored sketch’ starting her day at 5 am while in India. Places she visited include Australia, New Zealand, America, China, and Japan. While in New Zealand in 1877, she visited several North Island locations including Kawau Island, the Coromandel Peninsula, Rotorua, Wairoa, and Auckland. She arrived in Hilo, Hawaii in October 1879, and was among the first artists to paint the active volcanoes. Her Hawaii travelogue, Fire Fountains: The Kingdom of Hawaii, was published in Edinburgh in 1883. She had several dangerous moments but her travel ended in 1880 when the Montana that she was on ran into rocks at Holyhead. While most of the passengers took the lifeboat, she stayed on last along with the captain to save her paintings and was rescued many hours later. She returned to live at Crieff with her widowed sister Eleanor and continued to write books.

Her best known books are At Home in Fiji (1881) and A Lady's Cruise on a French Man-of-War (1882). The book on Fiji was based on her travels in 1875, when she traveled to Fiji from England with Sir Arthur Gordon and his wife and spent the next year travelling around the Fijian islands. The latter book resulted from an invitation to join a French ship put into service for the Bishop of Samoa so that he could visit remote parts of his far-flung diocese. During that trip, Gordon-Cumming also visited Tonga and Tahiti.

Miss Gordon-Cumming received much criticism from male writers of the era, perhaps because she did not fit in the traditional Victorian role of women, as she often traveled alone and unaided. Henry Adams said her books are a collection of anecdotes without much interest. In any case, her landscape drawings and watercolors seem to be universally admired.

=== Visit to California ===
Gordon-Cumming arrived in San Francisco at the end of April 1878. Her plan was to depart for Honolulu three weeks later. Within her first few days in the city she encountered old friends from back home.

On April 22nd, she ran into a friend from Sussex, who suggested she visit the Yosemite Valley before departing for Honolulu. She spent the rest of her day touring San Francisco and the surrounding countryside.

Another chance encounter a couple of days later reconnected her with a longtime friend from home in Morayshire. This friend, Mr. David, arrived in San Francisco that day with plans to beginn arranging a trip to Yosemite. The two quickly decided to travel together. They left San Francisco on April 26 and arrived at Clark's Ranch on the 28th. The next day was spent exploring the Mariposa Grove.

Her first glimpse of Yosemite Valley was enough to change her travel plans. She wrote: "The first glimpse of this extraordinary combination of granite crags and stupendous waterfalls showed me plainly enough that it would take me weeks to make acquaintance with them, and that if I fail to do so, I shall regret it all my life." She cancelled her travel to Honolulu and requested her mail be forwarded to Yosemite.

She published her letters back home as Granite Crags in 1884. While in Yosemite Miss Gordon-Cumming also drew watercolor sketches, which she displayed in Yosemite Valley—making it the first art exhibition in Yosemite.

=== Visit to China and end of life ===
In 1879, while visiting Peking, China, Miss Gordon-Cumming met William Hill Murray, a Scottish missionary to China. He had invented the Numeral Type system, through which blind and illiterate Chinese learned to read and write, by assigning numbers to each of the 408 Chinese Mandarin sounds. Gordon-Cumming wrote a book (1899) about the system and supported the school for the rest of her life.

== End of life and legacy ==
She died in Scotland on 4 September 1924, and is buried near Crieff.

Gordon-Cumming displayed her watercolor sketches on the outside of a hotel in Yosemite Valley. This is considered to be the first art exhibit in Yosemite.

The Honolulu Museum of Art, the Oakland Museum of California and the Yosemite Museum are among the public collections holding works by Constance Gordon-Cumming.

== Selected works ==
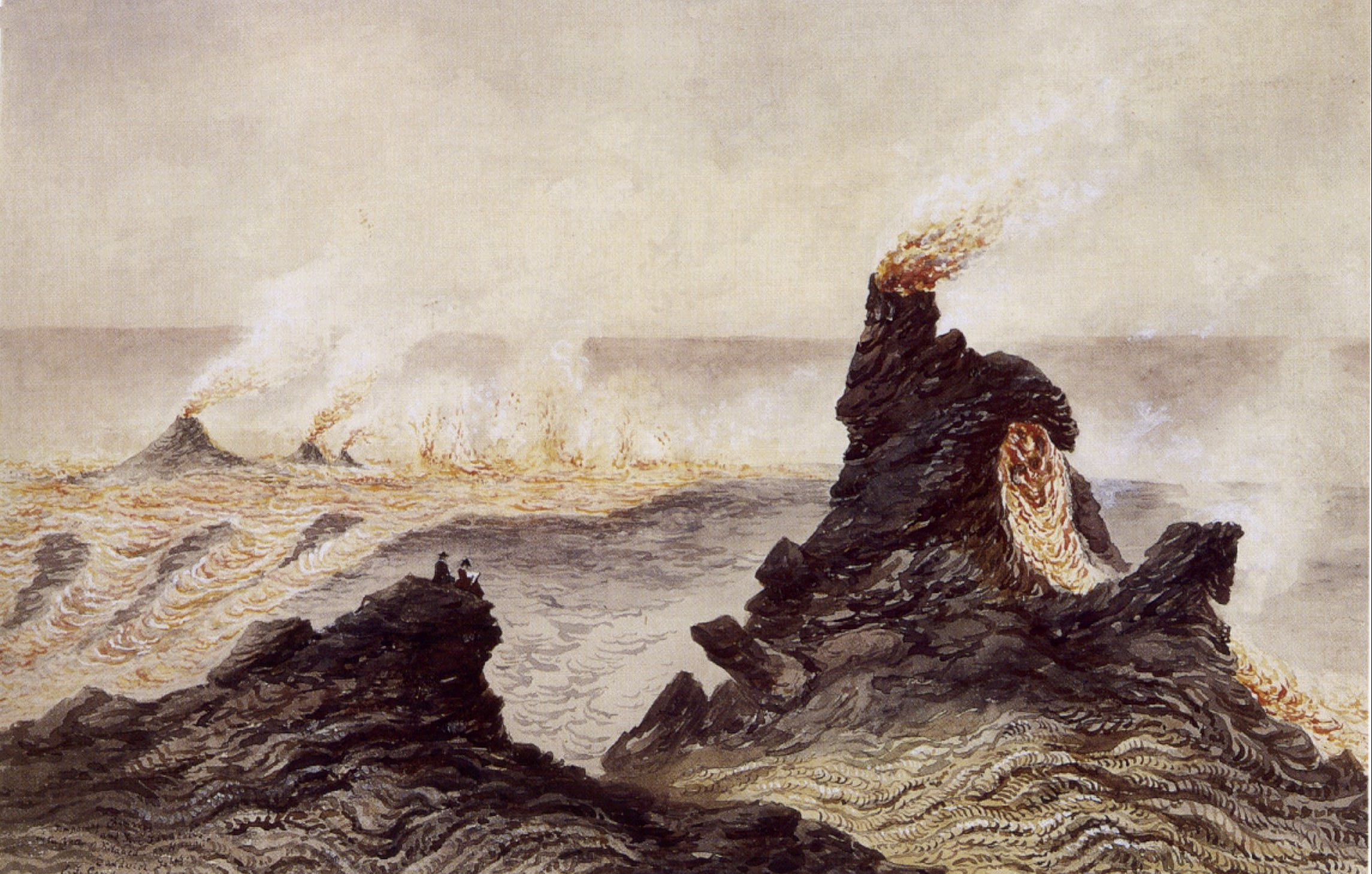
'Temporary Chimneys and Fire Fountains', watercolor by Constance Gordon-Cumming, c. 1880

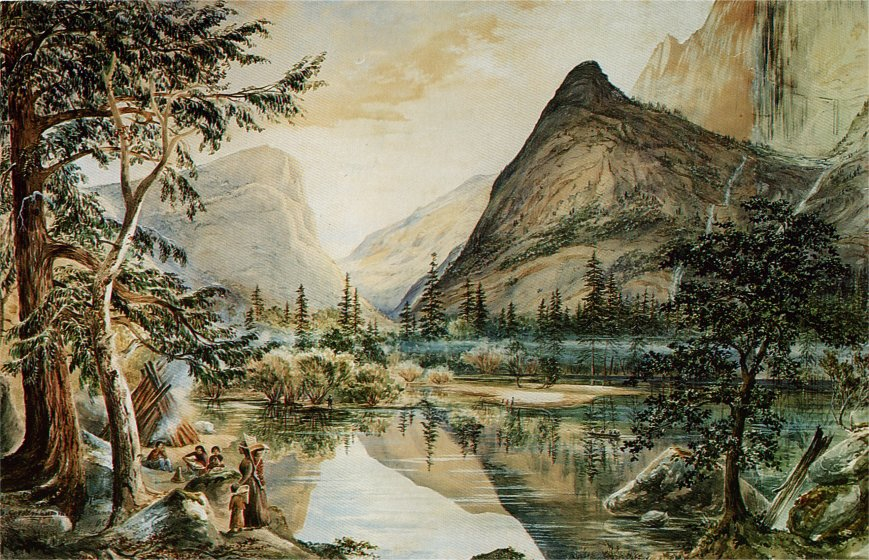
Indian Life at Mirror Lake (1878) by C. F. G.-C.

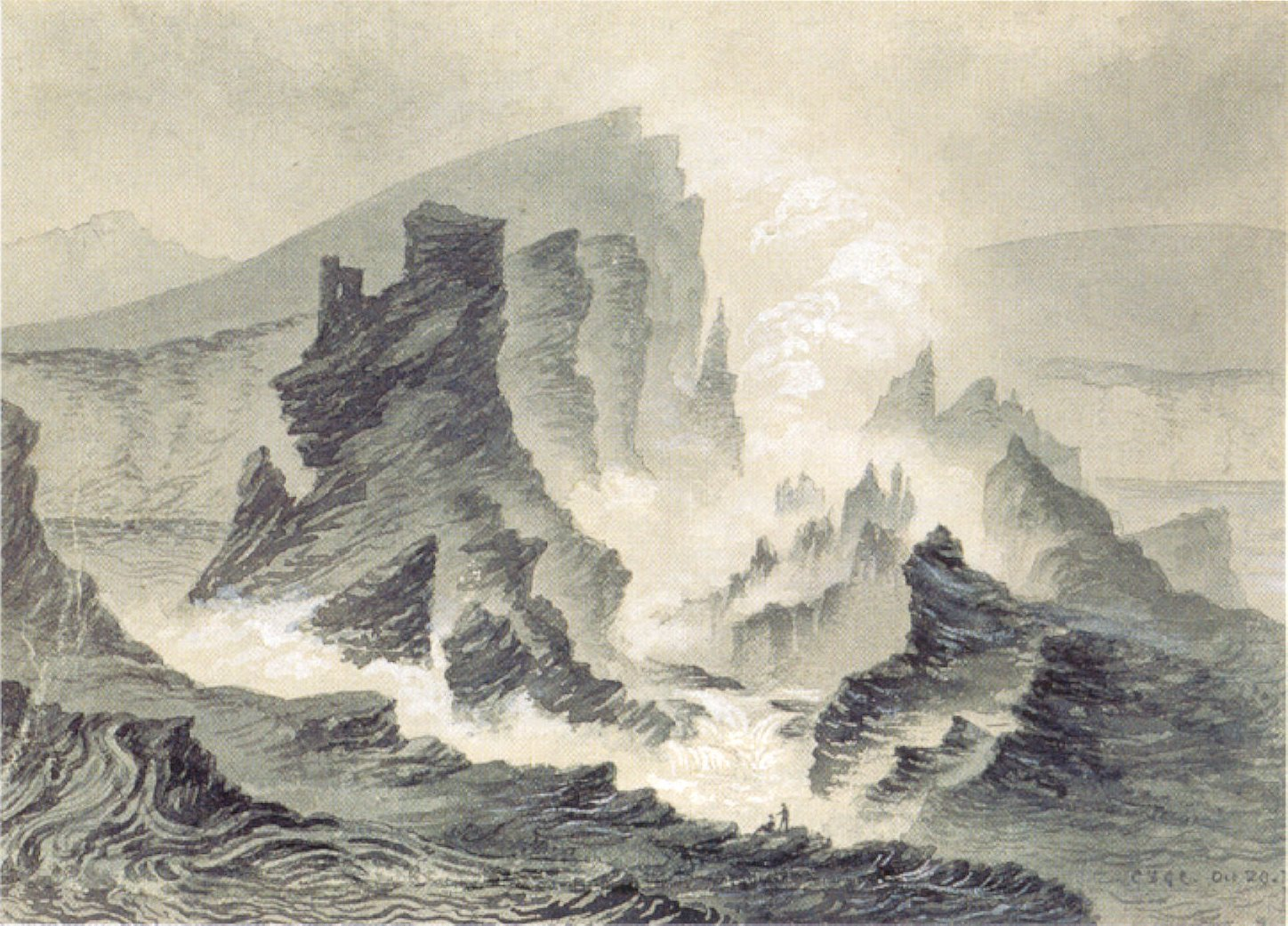
Halemaumau, 1879, ink wash with white heightening over traces of graphite by Constance Gordon-Cumming, 1879, Honolulu Museum of Art

== Publications ==
- From the Hebrides to the Himalayas; a Sketch of Eighteen Months' Wanderings in Western Isles and Eastern Highlands. (1876)
- "The Last King of Tahiti," Contemporary Review, v.41 (1881)
- At Home in Fiji (1881)
- A Lady's Cruise in a French Man-of-War (1882)
- "Gordon Ningpo and the Buddhist Temples," The Century Magazine (Sept.) (1882) (online at Making of America)
- Fire Fountains: The Kingdom of Hawaii (1883)
- In the Hebrides (Edinburgh). Cruising the Scottish Islands. (1883)
- "Fijian Pottery," The Art Journal (1884)
- Granite Crags (1884). (Reprinted in 1886 and 1888 as Granite Crags of California, minus 2 illustrations)
- In the Himalayas and on the Indian Plains (1884)
- "New Zealand in Blooming December," The Century Magazine (Dec.) (1884) (online at Making of America)
- "The Offerings of the Dead," British Quarterly Review (1885)
- Via Cornwell to Egypt (1885)
- Granite crags of California (1886)
- Wanderings in China 2 v. (1886)
- Work for the Blind in China: Showing How Blind Beggars may be transformed into useful Scripture Readers Part I (1887), Part II (Helensburgh, 1892)
- Notes on Ceylon (1889)
- Notes on China and its Missions (1889)
- "Across the Yellow Sea," Blackwood's Magazine (1890)
- Two Happy Years in Ceylon, 4d ed., 2 v. (1892)
- Two Happy Years in Ceylon, (1893)
- The Blind in China (1895)
- The Inventor of the Numeral-type for China, by the use of which Illiterate Chinese both Blind and Sighted can very Quickly be Taught to Read and Write Fluently (1899)
- Wanderings in China (1900)
- Memories. Autobiography (1904)
