= General Cumming =

General Cumming may refer to:

- Alfred Cumming (general) (1829–1910), Confederate States Army brigadier general
- Andrew Cumming (fl. 1960s–2000s), British Army major general
- Hanway Robert Cumming (1867–1921), British Army brigadier general
- Henry John Cumming (1771–1856), British Army general
- Samuel C. Cumming (1895–1983), U.S. Marine Corps major general

== See also ==
- Emerson LeRoy Cummings (1902–1986), U.S. Army lieutenant general
- James Turner Cummins (1843–1912), British Indian Army major general
