= William Gordon-Cumming =

William Gordon-Cumming may refer to:

- Sir William Gordon-Cumming, 2nd Baronet (1787–1854), Scottish Member of Parliament for Elgin Burghs 1831–1832
- Sir William Gordon-Cumming, 4th Baronet (1848–1930), Scottish soldier and adventurer, central figure in the Royal baccarat scandal
- Sir William Gordon-Cumming, 6th Baronet (1928–2002), of the Gordon-Cumming baronets
