= Alexander Cumming-Gordon =

Scottish politician

Sir Alexander Cumming-Gordon, Bt

Member of Parliament for Inverness Burghs
- In office 1802–1803
- Preceded by: Sir Hector Munro
- Succeeded by: George Cumming

Personal details
- Born: Alexander Penrose Cumming; 19 May 1749
- Died: 10 February 1806 (aged 56)
- Spouse: Helen Grant (after 1773)
- Children: 16
- Parent: Alexander Cumming

Sir Alexander Penrose Cumming-Gordon, 1st Baronet (19 May 1749 – 10 February 1806) was a Scottish politician.

== Early life ==
Alexander was born on 19 May 1749 into Clan Cumming. He was the eldest son of Alexander Cumming of Rosehill and Penrose, Cornwall. Among his siblings was brother George Cumming, also MP for Inverness Burghs.

== Career ==
In 1761, he succeeded to his father's estates; in 1775, he succeeded to Altyre, Forres, his great-uncle George Cumming's estate; and in 1795, he then succeeded to Gordonstoun, the estate of his cousin Sir William Gordon, 6th Baronet, after which he took additional surname of Gordon.

Cumming-Gordon sat as member of parliament for Inverness Burghs from 1802 to 1803 after which he was succeeded by his younger brother George Cumming. In 1804 he was created a baronet, of Altyre near Forres.

== Personal life ==
On 9 September 1773, he was married to Helen Grant, a daughter of Sir Ludovick Grant, 7th Baronet, of Castle Grant, and the former Lady Margaret Ogilvy (a daughter of James Ogilvy, 2nd Earl of Seafield). Together, they were the parents of seven sons and nine daughters, including:

- Sir William Gordon Gordon-Cumming, 2nd Baronet (1787–1854), MP for Elgin Burghs, who married Eliza Maria Campbell, eldest daughter of Col. John Campbell. After her death in 1842, he married Jane Eliza Mackintosh, a daughter of William Mackintosh, in 1846.
- Charles Cumming-Bruce (1790–1875), MP for Inverness Burghs and Elginshire and Nairnshire, who married Mary Elizabeth Bruce, the only daughter of James Bruce, in 1820.

Sir Alexander died on 10 February 1806 and was succeeded in the baronetcy by his eldest son, William.

=== Descendants ===
Through his second son Charles, he was a grandfather of Elizabeth Mary Cumming-Bruce, who married James Bruce, 8th Earl of Elgin.

Parliament of the United Kingdom
Preceded by Sir Hector Munro	Member of Parliament for Inverness Burghs; 1802–1803	Succeeded by George Cumming
Baronetage of the United Kingdom
New creation	Baronet (of Altyre); 1804–1806	Succeeded by William Gordon Gordon-Cumming
