= Campbell of Islay =

Campbell of Islay may refer to:

- Walter Frederick Campbell FRSE (1798–1855), Scottish politician
- John Francis Campbell (1821–1885), Scottish author and scholar who specialised in Celtic studies
