= Charles Bury, 2nd Earl of Charleville =

Irish peer, Tory politician and advocate of homeopathy

Charles William Bury
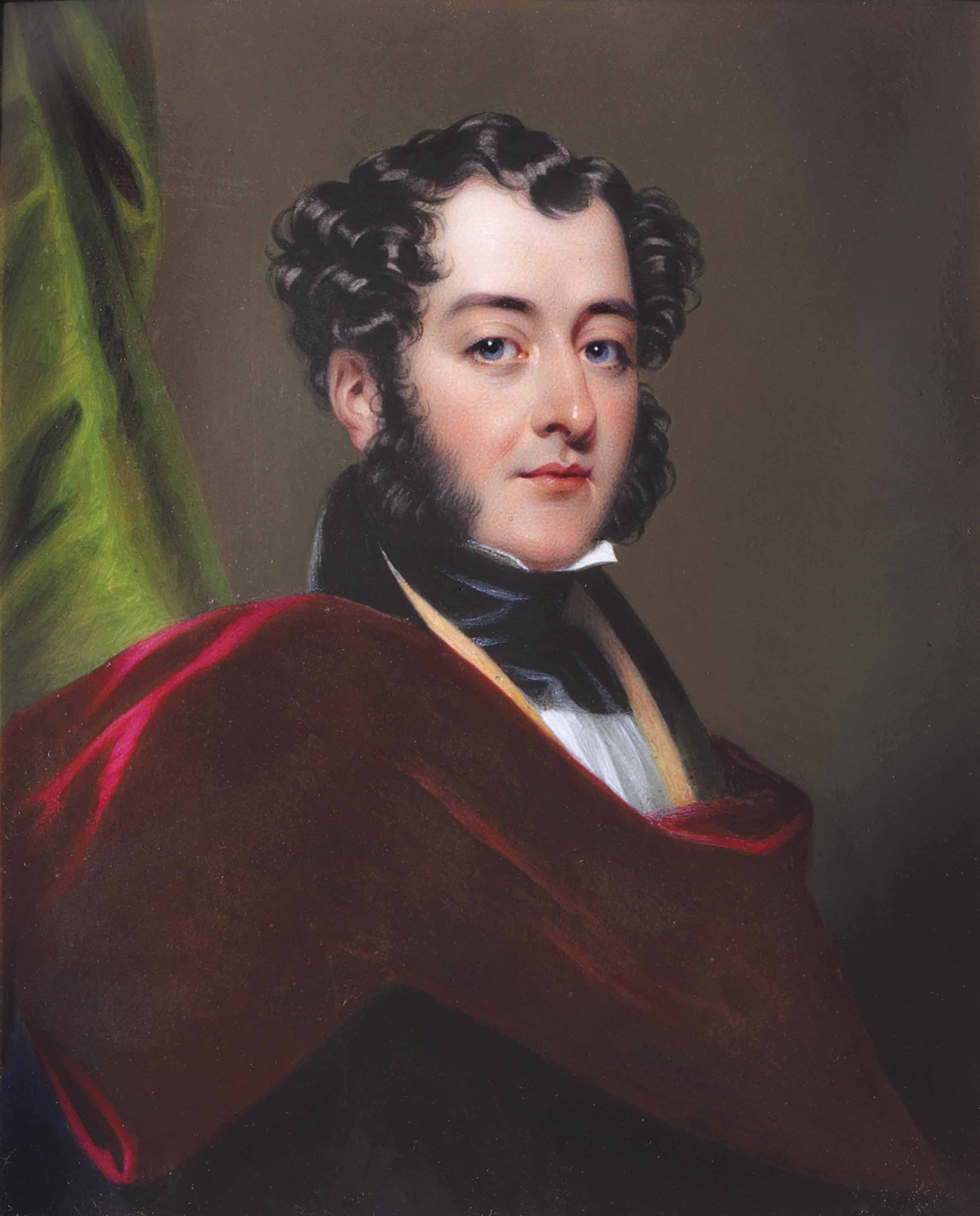

Member of the British Parliament for Carlow
- In office 1826–1832

Member of the British Parliament for Penryn and Falmouth
- In office 1832–1835

2nd Earl of Charleville
- In office 1835–1851

Personal details
- Born: 29 April 1801
- Died: 14 July 1851 (aged 50)

Charles William Bury, 2nd Earl of Charleville (29 April 1801 – 14 July 1851), styled Lord Tullamore between 1806 and 1835, was an Irish peer, Tory politician and advocate of homeopathy.

Bury was the only son of Charles Bury, 1st Earl of Charleville, by Catherine Maria Dawson, daughter of Thomas Townley Dawson. He was educated at Eton and served as High Sheriff of King's County in 1825. In 1826 he was returned to Parliament for Carlow, a seat controlled by the family. The constituency was abolished in the Reform Act 1832 and Bury's father launched an expensive campaign to keep his son in the House of Commons. He failed to be elected for King's County but was returned for Penryn and Falmouth in Cornwall, a seat he held until 1835. From 1834 to 1835 he also served as a Lord of the Bedchamber to King William IV. He succeeded his father in the earldom in 1835. This was an Irish peerage and did not entitle him to an automatic seat in the House of Lords. However, in 1838 he was elected an Irish representative peer. He was Major of the disembodied King's County Royal Rifle Militia from 28 June 1831 until his death.

Lord Charleville was also an advocate of homeopathy. He was a friend of Frederic Hervey Foster Quin, the first homeopathic physician in England, and also of the French artist and dandy Alfred d'Orsay. Charleville came increasingly into debt and was forced to sell off major parts of the family estates during the economic crisis in Ireland in the mid-1840s and eventually settled in Berlin.

In 1821 in Florence, Lord Charleville married Harriet Charlotte Beaujolais Campbell, daughter of Colonel John Campbell of Shawfield and Islay and Lady Charlotte Bury, and sister of Walter Frederick Campbell. They had three sons and a daughter. Lady Charleville was a minor author. She died in Naples in February 1848, aged 46. Lord Charleville died in July 1851, aged 50, and was succeeded by his eldest son, Charles.

Parliament of the United Kingdom
Preceded by Charles Harvey-Saville-Onley	Member of Parliament for Carlow; 1826–1832	Succeeded by Nicholas Aylward Vigors
New constituency	Member of Parliament for Penryn and Falmouth; 1832–1835; With: Sir Robert Rolfe	Succeeded by Sir Robert Rolfe; James William Freshfield
Political offices
Preceded by The Earl of Carrick	Representative peer for Ireland; 1838–1851	Succeeded by The Lord Dunsandle and Clanconal
Peerage of Ireland
Preceded by Charles William Bury	Earl of Charleville; 1835–1851	Succeeded by Charles William George Bury
