= Lady Charlotte Bury =

English novelist (1775–1861)

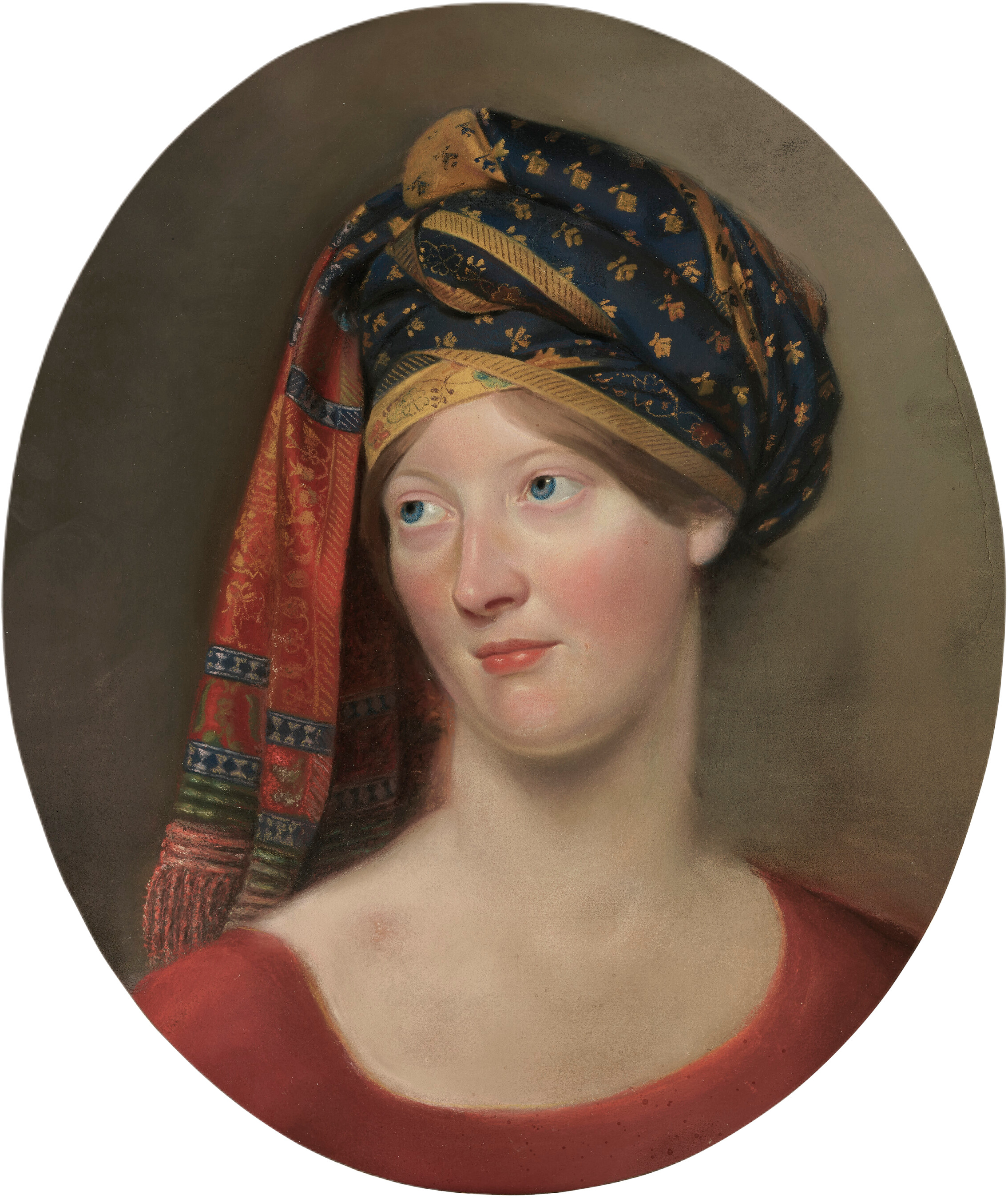
- Lady Charlotte Campbell by Archibald Skirving, 1819
- Born: Charlotte Susan Maria Campbell; 28 January 1775; London, England
- Died: 1 April 1861 (aged 86); London, England
- Occupation: Novelist
- Notable work: Diary illustrative of the Times of George IV (1838)
- Spouses: John Campbell (m. 1796; died 1809) Edward John Bury (m. 1818; died 1832)
- Children: 11, including: Walter Frederick Campbell; Eliza Maria, Lady Gordon-Cumming; Harriet Bury, Countess of Charleville
- Parent(s): John Campbell, 5th Duke of Argyll; Elizabeth Gunning

Lady Charlotte Susan Maria Bury (née Campbell; 28 January 1775 – 1 April 1861) was an English novelist, who is chiefly remembered in connection with a Diary illustrative of the Times of George IV (1838).

== Early life ==
Lady Charlotte Susan Maria Campbell was the daughter and the youngest child of Field Marshal John Campbell, 5th Duke of Argyll, and his wife the former Elizabeth Gunning; Elizabeth was the second daughter of John Gunning, of Castle Coote, County Roscommon, and the widow of James Hamilton, 6th Duke of Hamilton. Lady Charlotte was born at Argyll House, Oxford Street, London.

In her youth she was noted for her personal beauty and charm, which made her one of the most popular persons in society. As a young woman she travelled to Naples, where she was painted by Johann Heinrich Wilhelm Tischbein, in about 1789. He described her as "more perfect than the best artist could have imagined".

She was interested in "belles-lettres", and knew the literary celebrities of the day, including the young Walter Scott. It was at one of her parties that Scott met "Monk" Lewis. At the age of twenty-two she anonymously published a volume of poems.

== Marriage ==
She married on 14 June 1796 Colonel John Campbell (eldest son of Walter Campbell of Shawfield, by his first wife Eleanora Kerr), who, at the time of his decease in Edinburgh on 15 March 1809, was Member of Parliament for the Ayr Burghs. By this marriage she had nine children, of whom, however, only two survived her, Lady A. Lennox and Mrs. William Russell. Lady Charlotte Campbell married secondly, on 17 March 1818, the Reverend Edward John Bury (only son of Edward Bury of Taunton); they had two daughters. Bury received from University College, Oxford, his B.A. in 1811 and M.A. 1817. He assumed the position of rector in Litchfield, Hampshire, in 1814 and died at Ardencaple Castle, Dunbartonshire, in May 1832, aged 42.

== Lady-in-waiting to Caroline of Brunswick ==
After Lady Charlotte had been widowed in 1809, she was appointed a Lady-in-Waiting in the household of Caroline of Brunswick, Princess of Wales. It is believed that she kept a diary, in which she recorded the foibles and failings of the princess and other members of the court. The diary was later published anonymously, and the identity of its author was revealed in the Edinburgh Review by Lord Brougham; Lady Charlotte was rumoured to have received a thousand pounds from the publisher.

== Literary career ==
After her marriage to Bury, she made various contributions to light literature; some of her novels were very popular, although now almost forgotten. When the Diary illustrative of the Times of George IV appeared in two volumes in 1838, with a further two volumes being added in 1839. it was thought to bear evidence of a familiarity with the scenes depicted which could only be attributed to Lady Charlotte. It was reviewed with much severity, and attributed to her ladyship by both the Edinburgh and Quarterly Reviews. The diary was a big success and several editions sold out in a few weeks. The charge of the authorship was not denied, and no one else has claimed to have written the diary, which public libraries began to catalogue under Lady Charlotte's name. Volume 3 of the Diary was discovered by William Michael Rossetti to contain an encounter with William Blake; a rare description of the poet and artist from a contemporary.

== Disputed authorship ==
There are many instances in the diary that call into question the identification of Campbell as the author, chiefly on page 339 of volume one where the diarist writes the paragraph quoted below. "All goes gloomily for the Princess. Lady Charlotte Campbell told me, she regrets not seeing all these curious personages; but, she said, the more the Princess is forsaken, the more happy she is at having offered to attend her at this time. This is very amiable in her and must be gratifying to the Princess." This paragraph clearly indicates that the diarist was a close acquaintance of Lady Charlotte, but not Lady Charlotte herself.

In a paragraph on Page 133 of volume 3 the diarist writes, "Lady C. hints that Mr. Brougham intends to restrict the Princess of Wales to thirty thousand pounds, and to employ the remainder in paying the debts; and that the salaries of all her attendants must be diminished. Lady C. says she told him how herself and Lady C. Campbell were situated, and only desired him to do what he considered to be most just and equitable by all the household." This indicates that Henry Brougham's identification in the Edinburgh Review of Campbell as the author of the Diary Of The Times of George IV was wrong and may have been intentional to disguise the identity of the diarist, whose true identity he surely must have known.

== Death ==
Lady Charlotte died at 91 Sloane Street, Chelsea, on 31 March 1861. She was curiously described in her death certificate at Somerset House as "daughter of a duke and wife of the Rev. E. J. Bury, holding no benefice."

== Works ==
The following is believed to be a complete list of Lady Charlotte's writings; many of them originally appeared without her name, but even at that time there does not seem to have been any secret as to the identity of the writer:

1. Poems on several Occasions, by a Lady 1797
2. Self-indulgence : a tale of the nineteenth century. 1812. 2 volumes.
3. Conduct is fate. 1822. 3 volumes.
4. Alla Giornata, or To the Day anonymous, 1826. 3 volumes.
5. Flirtation anonymous, 1828, which went to three editions. 3 volumes.
6. A Marriage in High Life [By the Hon. Caroline Lucy Lady Scott.]edited by the author of Flirtation, 1828. 2 volumes.
7. The Exclusives 1830. 3 volumes.
8. The Separation by the author of Flirtation, 1830. 3 volumes.
9. Journal of the Heart edited by the author of Flirtation, 1830
10. The three great sanctuaries of Tuscany, Valombrosa, Camaldoli, Laverna: : a poem, with historical and legendary notices, by the Right Honourable Lady Charlotte Bury. 1833
11. The Disinherited and the Ensnared anonymous, 1834
12. Journal of the Heart second series, edited by the author of Flirtation, 1835
13. The Devoted by the author of The Disinherited, 1836
14. Love anonymous, 1837; second edition 1860
15. Memoirs of a Peeress, or the days of Fox by Mrs. C. F. Gore, edited by Lady C. Bury, 1837
16. Ellen Glanville by a Lady of Rank, 1838, 2 vols. Attributed to Bury by the New York Public library, but the basis for the attribution is unclear.
17. Diary illustrative of the Times of George the Fourth anonymous, 1838, 2 vols, 1839, 2 further vols.
18. The Divorced by Lady C. S. M. Bury, 1837; another edition 1858
19. The History Of A Flirt. Related By Herself anonymous 1840 (London) 3 vols.; 1841 (Phila.) 2 vols.
20. Family Records, or the Two Sisters by Lady Charlotte Bury, Philadelphia: Lea & Blanchard, 1841, 2vols.
21. The Manoeuvring Mother. By the author of "the History of a Flirt". 1842. London. 3 volumes.
22. The Wilfulness of Woman. By the authoress of "The History of a Flirt". 1844. London : Henry Colburn. 3 volumes.
23. The Roses. : By the author of "The history of a flirt." 1853. London : Hurst and Blackett, 3 volumes
24. The lady of fashion / by the author of "The history of a flirt". 1856. London : Hurst and Blackett, 3 volumes
25. The Two Baronets a novel of fashionable life, by the late Lady C. S. M. Bury, 1864.

She is also said to have been the writer of two volumes of prayers, Suspirium Sanctorum, which were dedicated to Samuel Goodenough, bishop of Carlisle.

== Children ==
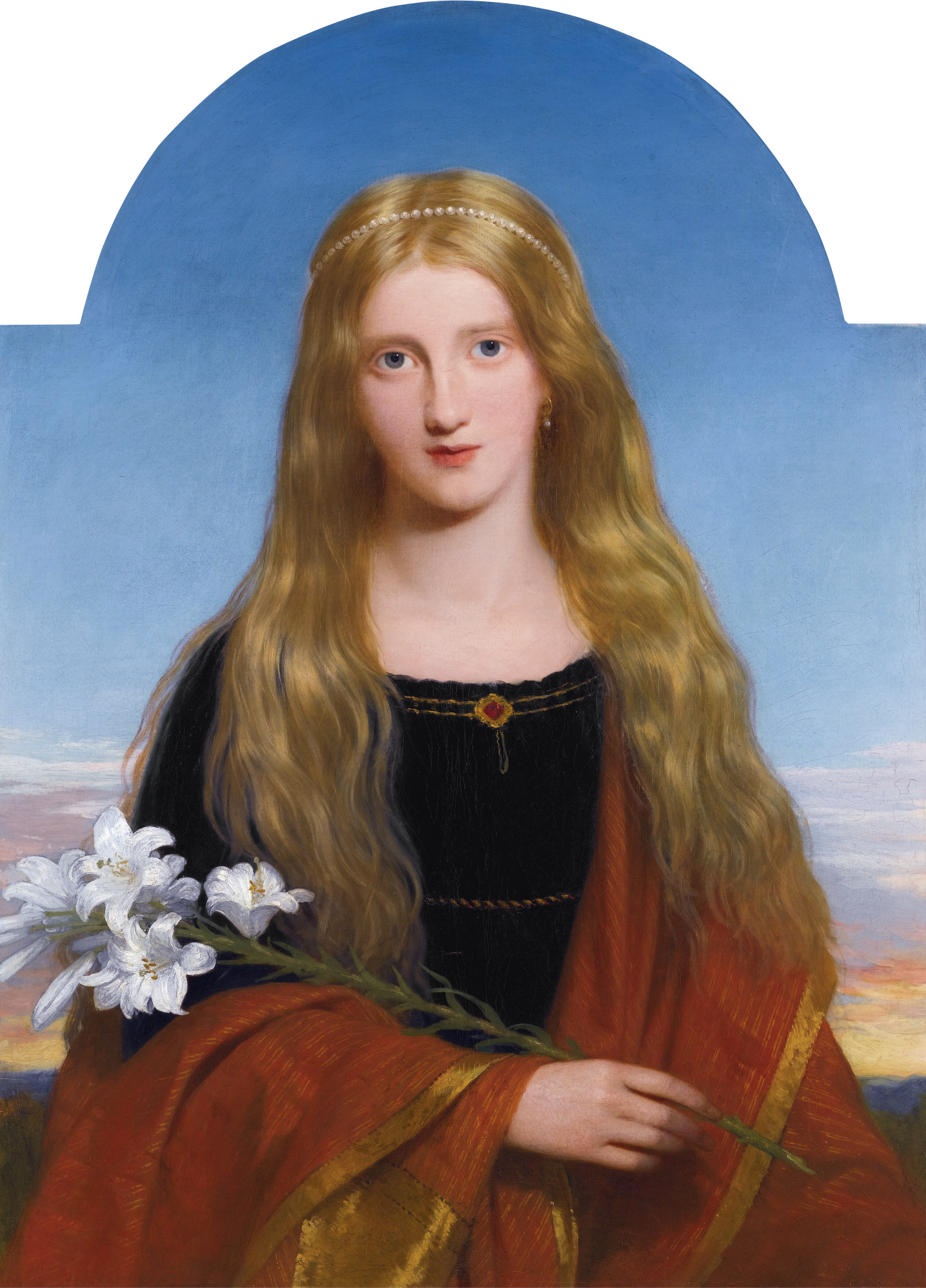
Daughter of Charlotte and Edward John Bury (Charles Lock Eastlake)

Children of Colonel John Campbell and Lady Charlotte:

- Walter Frederick (1798–1855), MP for Argyllshire 1822–32 and 1835–41, and inheritor of the island of Islay
- John George (1800–1830), married Ellen, daughter of Sir Fitzwilliam Barrington, 10th Baronet
- Eliza Maria (1795–1842), palaeontologist, married Sir William Gordon-Cumming, 2nd Baronet
- Eleanora (died 1828), married Henry, Earl of Uxbridge (later (2nd Marquess of Anglesey)
- Harriet Charlotte Beaujolais (August 1801 - February 1848), a minor author, married Charles, Lord Tullamore (later 2nd Earl of Charleville)
- Emma, married William Russell, youngest son of Lord William Russell
- Adelaide, married Lord Arthur Lennox
- Julia, married Peter Langford-Brooke, of Mere Hall in Cheshire
