= Anthony Alexander Forrest =

Australian footballer and soldier

Anthony Forrest

Personal information
- Full name: Anthony Alexander Forrest
- Born: 20 November 1884; Perth, Western Australia
- Died: 15 May 1901 (aged 16) near Carolina, Transvaal
- Original team: The High School
- Positions: Ruckman, ruck-rover

Playing career^{1}
Years	Club	Games (Goals)
1900	Perth	2 (0)
- ^{1} Playing statistics correct to the end of 1900.

Anthony Alexander Forrest (20 November 1884 – 15 May 1901) was an Australian rules footballer and soldier who was killed in the Second Boer War. The son of Alexander Forrest, a politician and twice Mayor of Perth, he attended The High School (now Hale School) in Perth, Western Australia. Aged 15, he also played two games of senior football for the Perth Football Club in what is now the West Australian Football League (WAFL), becoming one of the youngest players to play in that league. Forrest enlisted in the 5th Western Australian Mounted Infantry in 1900, and was killed the following year near Carolina, Transvaal, at the age of 16. He was the first Western Australian footballer to be killed on active duty, and the only Western Australian footballer killed in the Boer War.

== Early life and football career ==
Forrest was born in Perth as one of five children born to Amy Eliza (née Barrett-Lennard) and Alexander Forrest. On his mother's side, he was a descendant of the Barrett-Lennard baronets and the Barons Dacre. His father was an explorer and surveyor who later served as Mayor of Perth, and represented the seat of West Kimberley in the Western Australian Legislative Assembly. His uncles, David and John Forrest, were also politicians, with the latter serving as the first Premier of Western Australia. Growing up, Forrest attended The High School (later Hale School) on St Georges Terrace in the centre of Perth. At school, he was a noted sportsman, and later served as a prefect of the school. Forrest was the bowman for the crew that won the first Head of the River race in 1899 and kept wicket for the school's cricket team. He also played a number of games for the school's football team, and captained the side to victories against Christian Brothers' College and Scotch College.

In a match for The High School against Scotch College, on 25 July 1900, Forrest did "the lion's share of the ruck work", and kicked six goals, which were "all smartly 'snatched' out of the ruck and sent through from various angles with accurate aim". His performance in this game attracted the attention of a Mr. Dixon, who was the secretary of the Perth Football Club in the West Australian Football Association (WAFA), and, according to The West Australian, "on the look out for more recruits". Forrest debuted against the East Fremantle Football Club at the WACA Ground the following weekend, on 4 August, and acquitted himself well, according to the West Australian Sunday Times: "Forrest (a High School boy) played exceedingly well, and merited his inclusion in the team." He also played the following game, against West Perth, which was the last game of the season, for a total of two matches in his senior football career. Forrest was 15 years and 257 days old at the time of his first match, making him, along with Stan Magro, the second-youngest WAFL debutante, and one of only four confirmed people to have played before their sixteenth birthday, along with Magro, Stan Hussey, and Derwas Cumming.

== Military career and death ==
In late 1900, Forrest enlisted in the 5th Western Australian Mounted Infantry, and was assigned to the 5th (Mounted Infantry) Contingent, where he was made a lieutenant. A writer in The Sunday Times suggested that his position had been obtained after influence from family members, comments which Geoffrey Bolton, a biographer of Alexander Forrest, regarded as "unjustified" and "perhaps the most unnecessary and objectionable of all [the] personal attacks on the Forrests". The contingent carrying Forrest left the port of Fremantle on the transport ship Devon on 6 March 1901, arriving in Durban on 28 March. They were assigned to Major-General F. W. Kitchener's column in the eastern Transvaal, operating near the Lydenburg district. The 5th Contingent were involved in several skirmishes in April, and in the following month, May, crossed to Ermelo, under the command of General Bindon Blood. On 15 May, there was a severe firefight at Grobelaar Recht, near Carolina, in which Forrest and five other men were killed, and nine men wounded, one of whom subsequently died. The following day, more skirmishes occurred, with Lieutenant Frederick Bell later receiving the Victoria Cross for his actions on that day.

News of Forrest's death reached Australia later that month. His father, already in ill health, was said to be "shattered" at his son's death, and died barely a month later, and his uncle, Sir John Forrest, at the time federal Minister for Defence, was cabled in Melbourne with the news. Prior to his death, Forrest had been Mentioned in Despatches, but news of this reached Australia at the same time as that of his death. Forrest was the first Western Australian footballer and the first attendee of Hale School to be killed in active service. After his death, a plaque was erected in St George's Cathedral. Forrest's name also features on the Australian War Memorial in Canberra, and the Kings Park War Memorial in Perth.
