= Joseph Cumming =

American scholar of Islamic and Christian thought

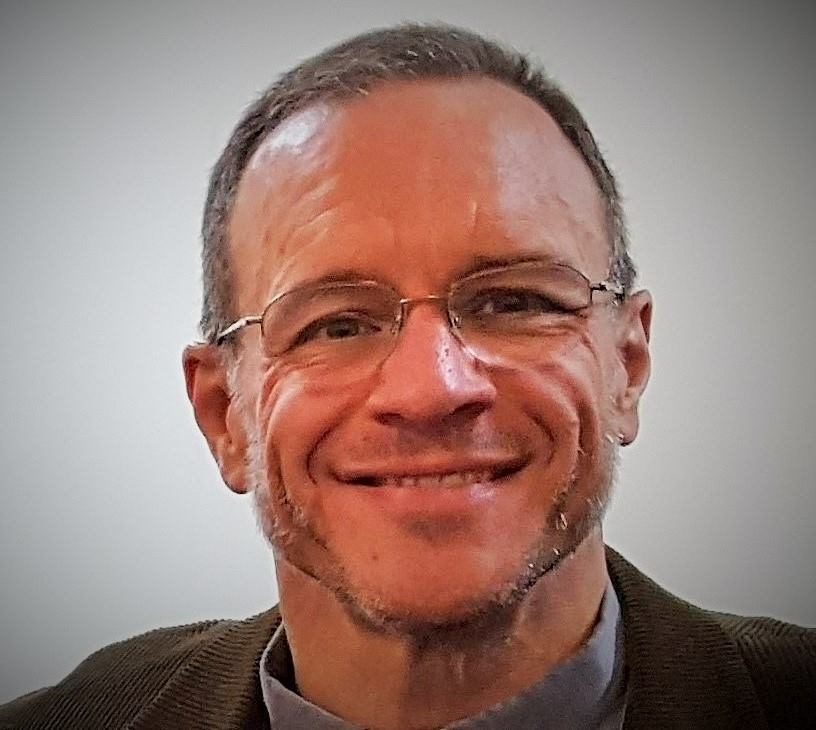
- Born: New York City, United States
- Education: Princeton University (AB); Fuller Theological Seminary (M.Div.); Yale University (Ph.D.)
- Spouse(s): Rev. Dr. Michele Pezdirtz Cumming, DIS (1984–present)
- Website: www.josephcumming.com

Joseph Cumming is an American scholar specializing in Islamic and Christian thought. He serves as International Director of the Woodberry Intercultural Institute and as Research Faculty at Fuller Theological Seminary. He previously worked at Yale University as Director of the Reconciliation Program at the Yale Center for Faith and Culture and taught courses at Yale Divinity School. He later served as Pastor of the International Church at Yale.

Cumming works internationally as a consultant on Muslim–Christian and Muslim–Christian–Jewish relations. He was one of the architects of the "Yale Response" to the Common Word initiative of 138 prominent Muslim leaders and scholars.

As International Director of Doulos Community, he led a humanitarian program for 15 years in the Islamic Republic of Mauritania, where he also served as President of the Federation of NGOs in Mauritania.

Cumming has published numerous articles on issues affecting relations among the Abrahamic faith communities. He has lectured in Arabic at Al-Azhar University and other Islamic institutions and has taught courses at Yale Divinity School, Fuller Theological Seminary, and other Evangelical institutions.

He has been interviewed in Arabic on Al Jazeera and other Arab television networks, and in English on American and Canadian television and radio, and in French and German by European and African news media.
