= James Turner Cummins =

British army officer

Major-General James Turner Cummins CB DSO (12 October 1843 – 24 October 1912) was a British military officer who served in the Indian Army.

He was born in Cork, Ireland, in 1842, the son of Nicholas Cummins. He was educated at Cheltenham College and at Addiscombe Military Seminary. On passing out at Addiscombe in 1861 he was commissioned into the Madras Army. He was promoted to captain in 1873. In 1875, Cummins transferred to the Madras Staff Corps and served in the Second Anglo-Afghan War between 1878 and 1880. He thereafter served in the Anglo-Egyptian War of 1882 and was made a major in 1883. In 1885, he took part in the Suakin Expedition and the Third Anglo-Burmese War, where he was mentioned in dispatches twice. Following this he was appointed assistant adjutant-general to the Madras Force and became a lieutenant colonel in 1887 and colonel in 1894. Between 1895 and 1900 he was placed in command of a 2nd class district. During the Boxer Rebellion in China in 1900 he commanded the 4th Infantry Brigade, which was mentioned in dispatches. He was made a Companion of the Bath in 1901 and in 1903 he retired from service and returned to England. The following year he was appointed the honorary position of colonel of the 30th Lancers (Gordon's Horse). He lived his later years in London, where he died in 1912. He married Louisa Dunman in 1869 and had three sons.
