= George Cumming (politician) =

George Cumming (20 November 1752 – 1 May 1834) was a Scottish politician. He sat in the House of Commons of the United Kingdom for two periods between 1803 and 1826.

A brother of Sir Alexander Cumming-Gordon, he served with the British East India Company before becoming a financial speculator in London.

He was elected at a by-election in 1803 as the Member of Parliament (MP) for the Inverness Burghs, succeeding his brother in the family-controlled seat. He stood down at the 1806 general election in favour of a relative, Francis Grant. However, control of the seat slipped from his family, and he was defeated when he stood again in 1807.

After an agreement between the rival factions, he was re-elected in 1818 and 1820, and held the seat until 1826.

Parliament of the United Kingdom
Preceded by Alexander Cumming-Gordon	Member of Parliament for Inverness Burghs; 1803–1806	Succeeded by Francis William Grant
Preceded by Charles Grant	Member of Parliament for Inverness Burghs; 1818–1826	Succeeded by Robert Grant
