= Harriet Bury, Countess of Charleville =

English noblewoman and author

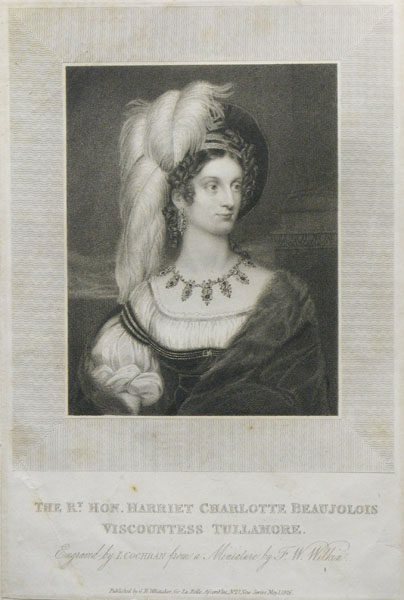
The Viscountess Tullamore, 1826 engraving after Francis William Wilkin

Harriet Bury, Countess of Charleville (August 1801 – 1 February 1848), formerly Harriet Charlotte Beaujolois Campbell, was an English noblewoman and writer.

She was the third daughter of Colonel John Campbell, 4th of Islay and of Woodhall, and his wife, the former Lady Charlotte Susan Maria Campbell, a daughter of John Campbell, 5th Duke of Argyll, and herself a writer. When Harriet's father died, her mother became a lady-in-waiting to the Princess of Wales, Caroline of Brunswick, and later married Rev. Edward John Bury.

She married Charles Bury, MP, Viscount Tullamore, on 26 February 1821, in Florence, Italy, prior to his inheriting his father's earldom of Charleville in the Irish peerage. The couple had four sons and two daughters.

- Charles William George Bury, 3rd Earl of Charleville, who married Arabella Louisa Case and had children
- Henry Walter Bury (1822-1830), who died in childhood
- Lady Beaujolais Eleanora Katherine (died 1903), who married Captain Hastings Dent (son of John Dent, MP)
- Lieutenant John James Bury (1827-1864), who married Charlotte Theresa Austin and had children
- Alfred Bury, 5th Earl of Charleville (1829-1875), who married Emily Frances Wood and had no children
- Julia Bury, who died in infancy

Her A Journey to Florence in 1817, a travel diary written when she was fourteen years old and visited the city with her family, was published in 1951, after a copy was found in a bookshop in London. Among other points of interest in the diary are comments on the activities of Pauline Bonaparte, who was living in Italy at the time, and was visited by her stepfather.

Viscountess Tullamore became a countess in 1835, when her husband inherited the earldom. Her portrait was among those published in 1828 in a collection entitled "Picture Gallery of the Female Nobility", printed in Belle Assemblée: Or, Court and Fashionable Magazine. She died in Naples, Italy, aged 46.
