= Kenneth Cumming =

Australian cricketer

Ken Cumming
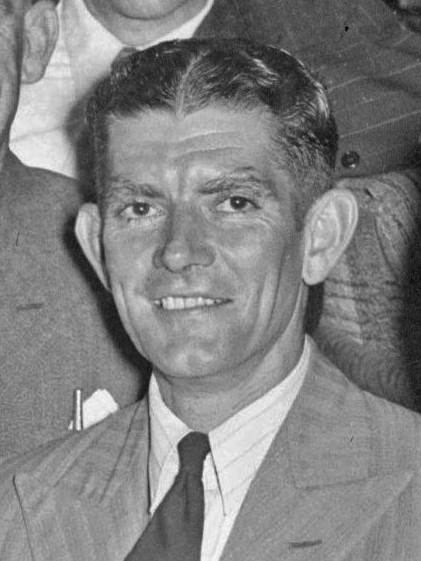
- Cumming in 1948

Personal information
- Full name: Kenneth Roy Cumming
- Born: 12 April 1916; East Coolgardie, Western Australia
- Died: 11 October 1988 (aged 72); Perth, Western Australia
- Batting: Right-handed
- Bowling: Right-arm fast-medium
- Role: Bowler

Domestic team information
- Years: Team
- 1945/46–1947/48: Western Australia

Career statistics
Competition	First-class
Matches	10
Runs scored	48
Batting average	4.80
100s/50s	0/0
Top score	13
Balls bowled	1,894
Wickets	23
Bowling average	28.60
5 wickets in innings	1
10 wickets in match	0
Best bowling	6/62
Catches/stumpings	3/–
- Source: CricketArchive, 25 May 2020

Kenneth Roy Cumming (12 April 1916 – 11 October 1988) was an Australian first-class cricketer who played for Western Australia in the Sheffield Shield. He was also a professional runner as well as an Australian rules footballer with Subiaco in the Western Australian National Football League (WANFL).

Cumming made his first appearance at WANFL club Subiaco in 1938, and two years later was appointed vice-captain.

On 28 October 1940, Cumming enlisted in the Royal Australian Navy. During the war, he served aboard the Australian destroyers Nestor, Stuart, and the sloop Parramatta. Cumming was one of only 24 survivors out of the 162 personnel aboard when Parramatta was torpedoed by the German submarine U-559 on 27 November 1941 in the Mediterranean; abandoning ship and later being rescued by British destroyer HMS Avon Vale.

Cumming, who hailed from the gold mining town of Coolgardie, continued his sporting career when he returned home and began putting in some good performances in first-grade cricket for Subiaco. In a match against Nedlands, he achieved a rare feat by taking five wickets in five balls. An ankle injury kept him off the football field in 1945 but by the end of the year had made it into the state cricket team, playing as a right-arm opening bowler and number 11 batsman.

He made his first-class debut for Western Australia in the 1945/46 season, against the Australian Services and claimed Keith Miller as his maiden wicket. In 1946 he had the greatest victory of his running career when he won the York Gift. The following summer, Cumming made two more first-class appearances, one for a Western Australia Combined XI, but both against the Marylebone Cricket Club. In 1947/48, Western Australia played in the Sheffield Shield for the first time and Cumming took part in all four of their fixtures. Despite it being their first attempt, Western Australia won the Shield, with Cumming contributing 13 wickets at 23.61 during the campaign. Nine of those wickets had come in the same match, against Victoria at the WACA Ground. He took a six wicket haul in the second innings, bowling four of the Victorians and having the other two caught.
