= John Campbell (1770–1809) =

Scottish soldier in the British Army

Colonel John Campbell, of Shawfield and Islay (c. 1770 – 13 March 1809) was a Scottish soldier in the British Army. After his early death, his widow Lady Charlotte Bury achieved fame as a diarist and novelist. He was also briefly a politician.

== Early life ==
Campbell was the oldest son of Walter Campbell of Shawfield and Islay, an advocate who served as Rector of the University of Glasgow from 1789 to 1791, and his first wife Eleanora, daughter of Robert Ker of New Field.

== Career ==
He joined the British Army in 1789 as an ensign in the 3rd Foot Guards. In 1793 he was promoted to lieutenant and then captain. He left the army in about 1799, and was later Colonel of the Argyll and Bute Militia.

In 1796, he married Lady Charlotte Susan Maria Campbell, daughter of the 5th Duke of Argyll. They had at least two sons and six daughters, but only two of the daughters survived their parents. On the death of Walter Campbell in 1816, John's son Walter Frederick Campbell inherited the 240 square mile island of Islay in the Inner Hebrides.

In 1794, he was elected on the interest of his brother-in-law, the 6th Duke of Argyll as the Member of Parliament (MP) for Ayr Burghs. He supported Argyll in opposing the Duke of Portland's ministry, and died two years after his election, aged about 39.

After his death, Lady Charlotte was appointed as a lady-in-waiting in the household of Caroline of Brunswick (then Princess of Wales, later Queen) until 1815, when she married John Bury, who became a Church of England rector. Her first novel was published anonymously in 1812 and followed by a dozen more. She also kept a diary of life in court which was published anonymously in 1838, but widely attributed to her.

== Children ==
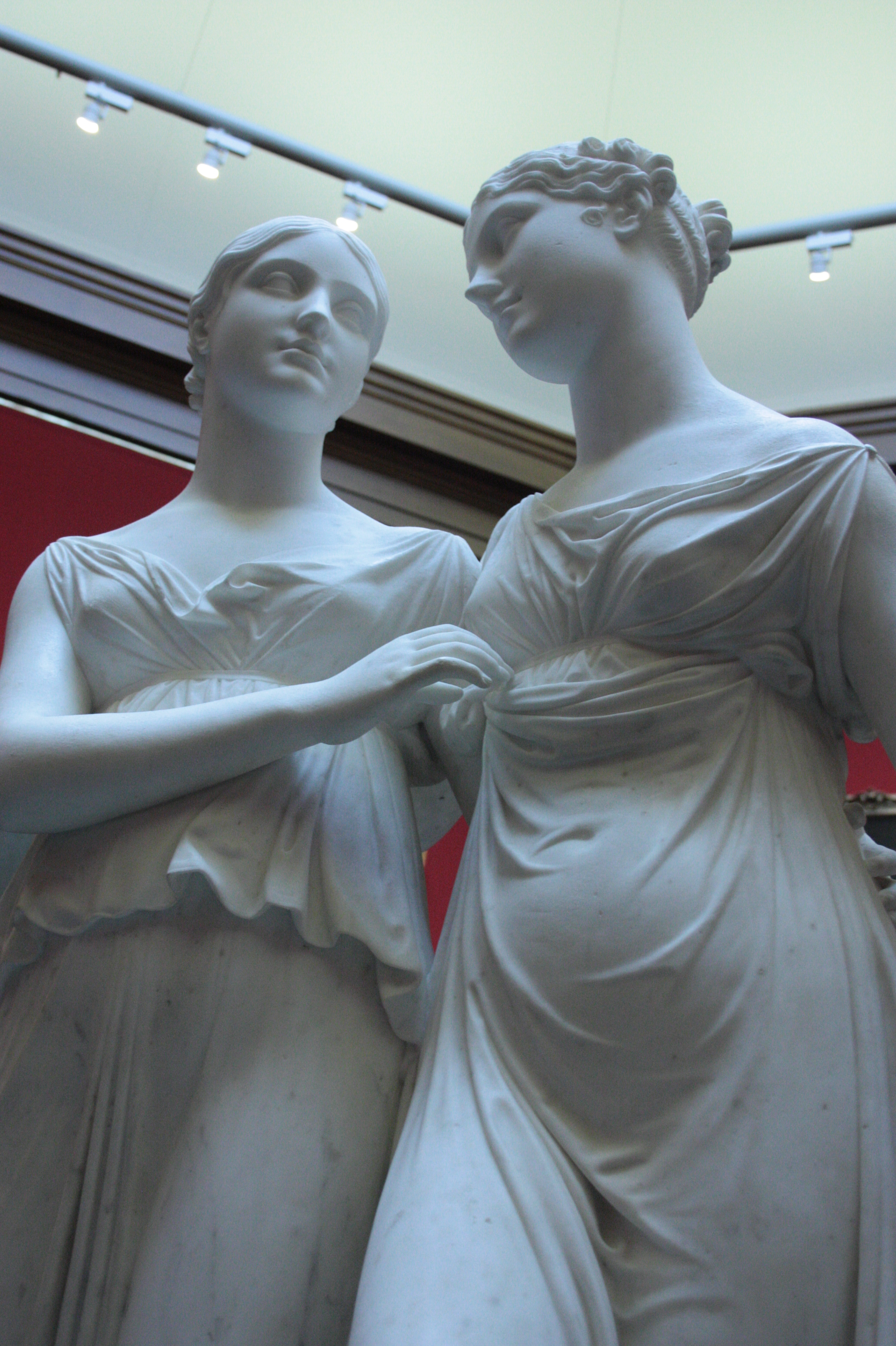
The Campbell Sisters (Emma and Julia) by Lorenzo Bartolino 1822, Scottish National Gallery

Children of Colonel John Campbell and Lady Charlotte:

- Walter Frederick (1798–1855), MP for Argyllshire 1822–32 and 1835–41, and inheritor of the island of Islay
- John George (1800–1830), married Ellen, daughter of Sir Fitzwilliam Barrington, 10th Baronet
- Eliza Maria (1795-1842), palaeontologist, married Sir William Gordon-Cumming, 2nd Baronet
- Eleanora (died 1828), married Henry Paget, 2nd Marquess of Anglesey
- Harriet Charlotte Beaujolois (died in Naples in February 1848), an author, married Charles, Lord Tullamore (later 2nd Earl of Charleville)
- Emma, married William Russell, youngest son of Lord William Russell, who was murdered by his valet.
- Adelaide, married Lord Arthur Lennox, son of the 4th Duke of Richmond
- Julia, married Peter Langford-Brooke, of Mere Hall in Cheshire

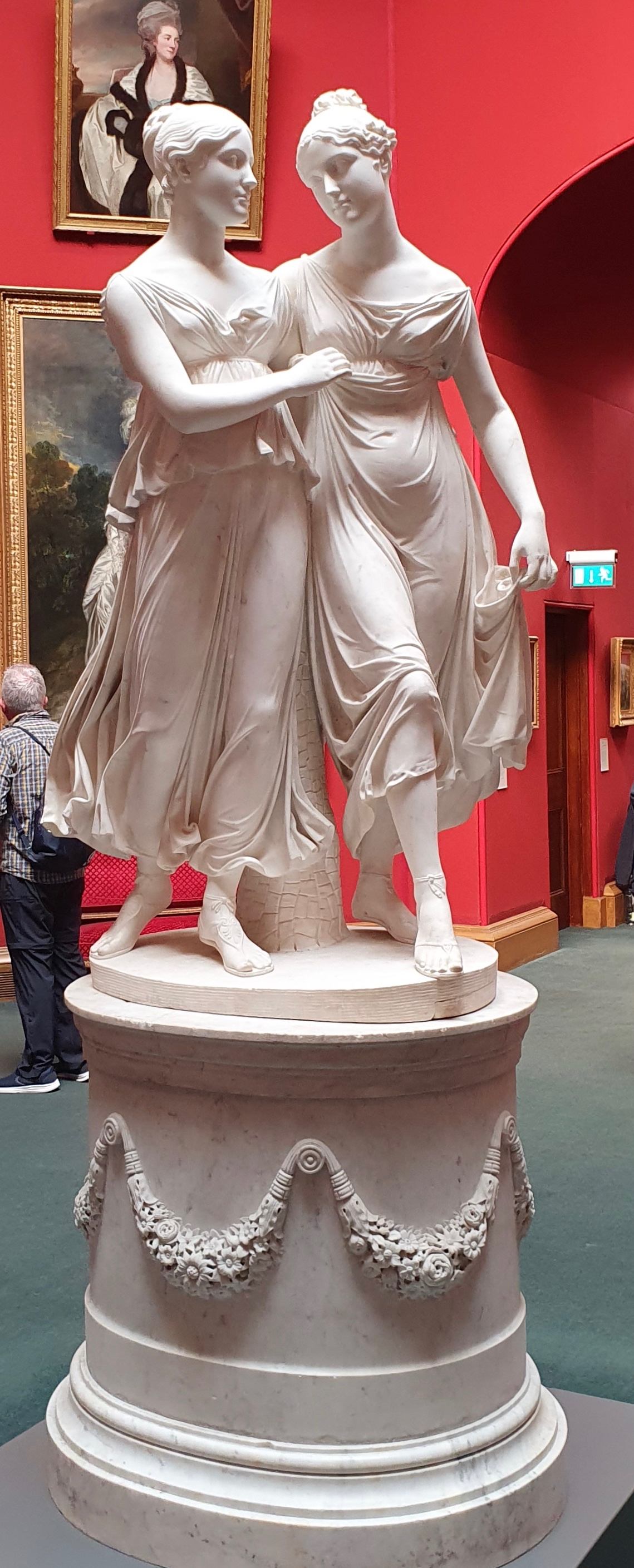
The Campbell Sisters by Lorenzo Bartolini at Scottish National Gallery

After John's death the family commissioned Lorenzo Bartolini to sculpt the youngest daughters, Julia and Emma.

Parliament of the United Kingdom
Preceded by John Campbell	Member of Parliament for Ayr Burghs; 1807–1809	Succeeded by Duncan Campbell
