= The Separation (Bury novel) =

1830 novel

- Author: Lady Charlotte Bury
- Language: English
- Genre: Silver Fork
- Publisher: Colburn and Bentley
- Publication date: 1830
- Publication place: United Kingdom
- Media type: Print

The Separation is an 1830 novel by the British writer Lady Charlotte Bury, published in three volumes. It falls into the tradition of silver fork novels, popular at the time. It was published in New York City by Harper the same year in two rather than three volumes. It was published anonymously, although Bury's authorship was widely known. A reviewer attacked it for recycling the plot entirely from Bury's 1812 novel Self-indulgence, although the resulting publicity seemed to help the novel's sales.

== Synopsis ==
Lord Fitzharris, a London dandy, falls in loves with and marries a penniless Frenchwoman Lenora while travelling on the Continent. Realising that his marriage to a Catholic Frenchwoman will not be appreciated by his family, whose fortunes depend on him marrying a wealthy woman, he abandons Lenora and his young son in England after a failed attempt at persuading a friend to take her on as his mistress. He then commits bigamy by marrying the daughter of a wealthy merchant living in Grosvenor Square. His new wife proves to be a kinder and more moral person than her Fitzharris. After discovering about the now ill Lenora she tends to the Frenchwoman on her deathbed, and then adopts the son as her own. Lord Fitzharris seems to have learned little from the experience, and his repentance is shallow.

== Bibliography ==
- Copeland, Edward. The Silver Fork Novel: Fashionable Fiction in the Age of Reform. Cambridge University Press, 2012.
- Mitchell, Charles & Mitchell, Paul. Landmark Cases in the Law of Restitution. Bloomsbury Publishing, 2006.
