= Walter Frederick Campbell =

British politician (1798–1855)

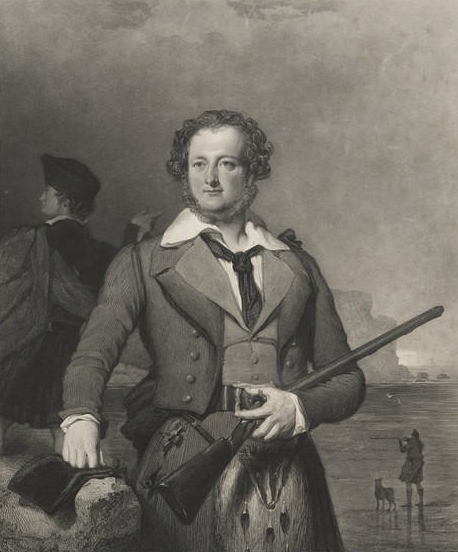
Walter Frederick Campbell

Walter Frederick Campbell of Shawfield (sometimes given "of Islay") FRSE (1798–1855), was a Scottish politician. He served as the MP for Argyllshire, 1822–1832 and 1835–1841.

== Early life and political career ==
He was born on 10 April 1798, the son of John Campbell (1770–1809), and his wife Lady Charlotte Susan Maria Campbell, daughter of John Campbell, 5th Duke of Argyll. His father was the son of Walter Campbell of Shawfield, from whom Walter Frederick inherited the island of Islay. He was educated at Eton College from 1811, and succeeded his grandfather in 1816.

Campbell took over the Argyllshire parliamentary seat of his uncle Lord John Campbell in 1822, based on his Whig sympathies. Initially his attendance in the House of Commons was sporadic. He did not contest his seat in 1832, shortly after his first wife's death; he was returned unopposed in 1835, and remained in parliament to 1841.

Campbell was elected a Fellow of the Royal Society of Edinburgh on 3 June 1822.

== Laird of Islay ==
As the Laird of Islay Campbell contended from 1816 with the agricultural face of the post-Napoleonic depression. He intended to retain the island's population, to avoid mass eviction and to counter voluntary emigration. To that end, he built new villages and improved infrastructure, worked to diversify agriculture and also dictated its reform. Local features were the relative absence, compared with most of the western Scottish Highlands, of tenants with larger sheep farms, and the incidence of land subdivision associated with kelp production.

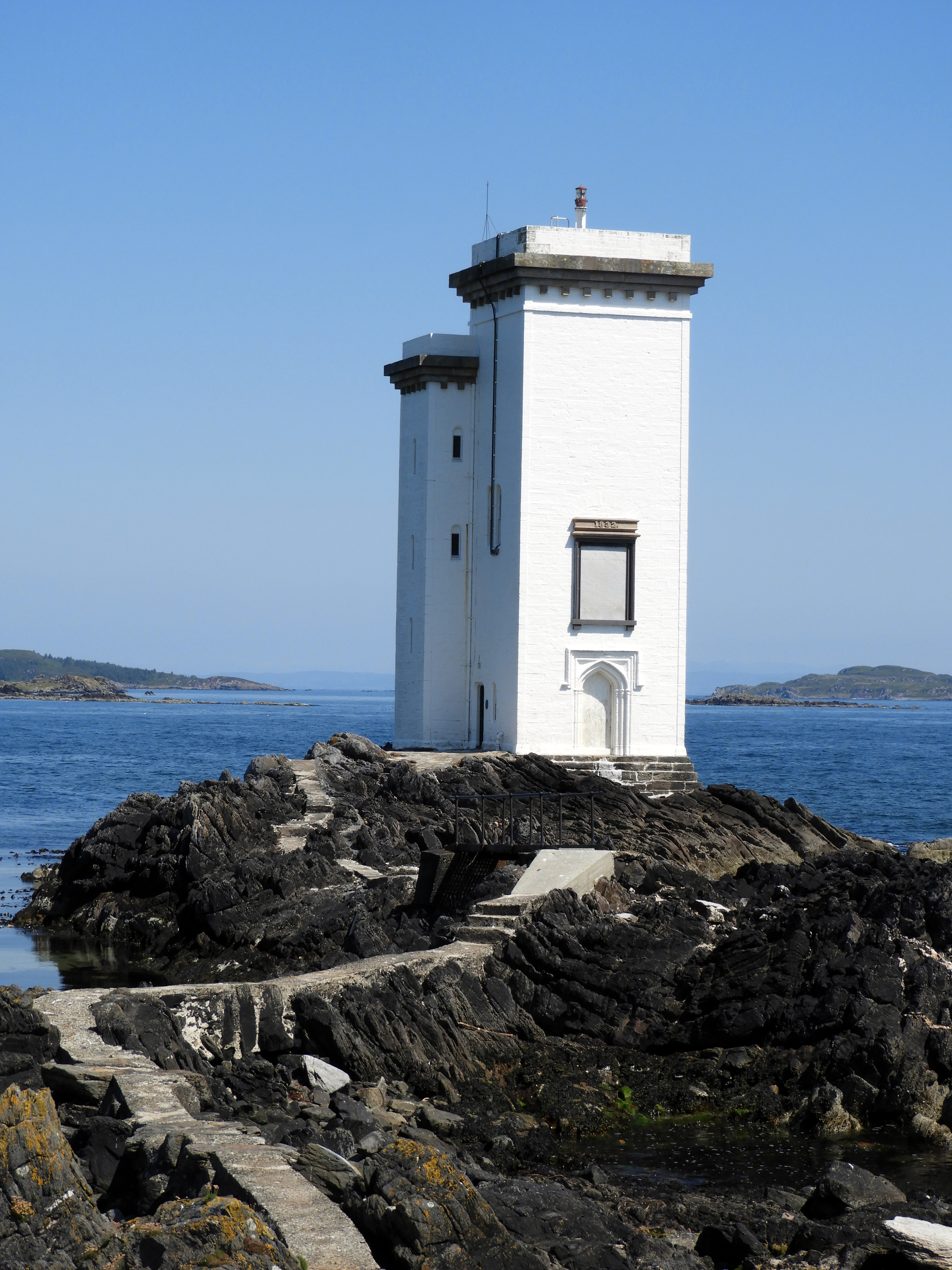
Carraig Fhada Lighthouse, built in 1832 by Walter Frederick Campbell, dedicated to the memory of his first wife

Campbell spent heavily, and a debt of £815,000 lay on the estate. During the 1840s Islay was hit by the agricultural depression and the potato blight associated with the Highland Potato Famine. Campbell suffered bankruptcy in 1847.

Campbell in April 1847 was assuring officials that he would create employment so that men would not be idle: but in writing to Edward Pine Coffin, commissary-general, the Deputy-Commissary-General John Saumarez Dobree voiced a worry that Campbell was weakening his own finances. Joseph Mitchell was a guest of the Campbells at the time, and witnessed Campbell's predicament: a greater concern than the blight was that tenants were not paying rents. Banks ceased to lend. Official policy was to use a Drainage Act for job creation, and for many landlords there was considerable benefit: but in the Islay case a successful application for support by Campbell led to his trustees running the employment schemes that kept tenants solvent.

Creditors moved in at the end of 1847, and the family left Islay. The estate was put into the hands of trustees, from 1848 to 1853 when it was sold to James Morrison. The debt burden stood at £185,000.

== Last years ==
Campbell spent some time with his ailing sister Harriet Bury, Countess of Charleville, in Italy. He then settled in Avranches, Normandy, in reduced circumstances. He died on 8 February 1855 in Avranches, and was buried in the cemetery there.

== Family ==
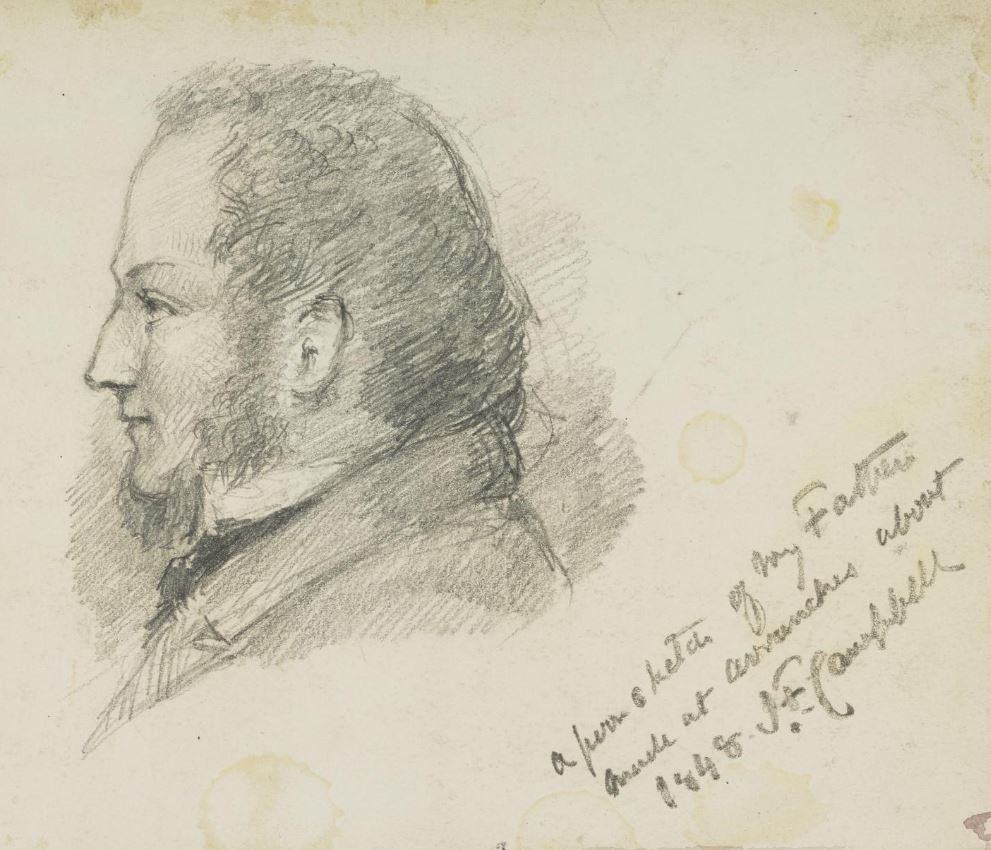
"A poor sketch of my father at Avranches about 1848", J. F. Campbell

Campbell was twice married:

1. Firstly, in 1820, to his cousin, Lady Eleanor Charteris (d. 1832), daughter of Francis Douglas, 8th Earl of Wemyss;
2. Secondly, in 1837, to Katherine Isabella, daughter of Stephen Thomas Cole.

By his first wife, he was the father of John Francis Campbell (1821–1885), born in Islay.

Of the children of the second marriage:

- Walter Douglas Somerset Campbell was an army officer and courtier.
- Augusta Elizabeth married in 1858 William Bromley-Davenport (1821–1884), Member of Parliament.
- Eila Frederika (Frederica) married in 1860 Sir Kenneth Mackenzie, 6th Baronet.
- Violet Katherine married in 1870 Henry Wyndham West.
- Castalia (Castilia) Rosalind married in 1865 Granville Leveson-Gower, 2nd Earl Granville as his second wife.

== Legacy ==
- Port Ellen, was named in 1821 by Walter Frederick Campbell for his wife, Eleanor, as was Port Wemyss near Portnahaven.
- Port Charlotte was named in 1828, Walter Frederick Campbell after his mother, Charlotte.

Parliament of the United Kingdom
Preceded by Lord John Campbell	Member of Parliament for Argyllshire; 1822 – 1832	Succeeded by James Henry Callander
Preceded by James Henry Callander	Member of Parliament for Argyllshire; 1835 – 1841	Succeeded by Alexander Cameron Campbell
