= Bruce Cumming =

South African cricketer

Bruce Leonard Cumming (11 July 1916 – 5 May 1968) was a South African cricketer who played first-class cricket from 1936 to 1938 for Oxford University and Sussex.

Cumming was born in Germiston, Transvaal, and educated at Michaelhouse in Natal before going to Oxford. He appeared in 24 first-class matches as a right-handed batsman. He scored 684 runs with a highest score of 60 and took two wickets with his occasional medium-pace bowling.
