= John Cumming (Australian footballer) =

Australian rules footballer

Personal information
- Full name: John Cumming
- Born: 12 June 1952 (age 74)
- Original team: Oakleigh Fourths
- Height: 178 cm (5 ft 10 in)
- Weight: 68 kg (150 lb)

Playing career^{1}
Years	Club	Games (Goals)
1973	Melbourne	4 (0)
- ^{1} Playing statistics correct to the end of 1973.

John Cumming (born 12 June 1952) is a former Australian rules footballer who played with Melbourne in the Victorian Football League (VFL).
