= The Seducing Cardinal =

Erotic novel (1830)

The Seducing Cardinal, or, Isabella Peto (also catalogued as The Seducing Cardinal's Amours with Isabella Peto and Others, &c.) is an anonymous erotic novel printed at London in 1830. The title page reads: "The Seducing Cardinal, or, Isabella Peto. A Tale founded on Facts. London: Published as the Act directs, By Madame Le Duck, Mortimer Street; and to be had of all Respectable Booksellers. 1830".

== Description ==
12mo. (counts 6); size of letter-press 4 5/8 by 2 7/8 in (117 by 73 mm); pp. 78; on the title-page a graduated and a plain line; five obscene, coloured engravings, differing in style of execution; date correct; published by J. B. Brookes.

== Plot ==
The Seducing Cardinal is "John Peter Carraffa, who was afterwards Pope by the name of Paul the 3d", (Note: According to Henry Spencer Ashbee, "Pope Paul III was a Farnese, not a Caraffa, nor was there a John Peter Caraffa, a personage having probably no existence except in the brain of the author.") and Isabella Peto is an orphan of 18 years "on the point of marriage with Signor Antonio Lucca". Carraffa is smitten with her beauty, and in order to gain possession of her, causes her betrothed to be thrown into the prison of the Inquisition. Isabella is advised by a woman who has passed through the Cardinal's hands, and is in his interest, to apply to him for her lover's release; she does so, and purchases his freedom with her virginity. The young people are united; but a week after the marriage Lucca is ordered to his post in Candia, and the Cardinal renews his intimacy with Isabella. Soon after, Isabella sets sail to join her husband, who however "was killed in an action with the Turks, and she fell into the hands of the Bey of Adrianople, to whose Seraglio she was immediately conveyed." The remainder of the book is devoted to her treatment by her new master, and to several letters between the Bey and Atalide, his favourite slave. Eventually Carraffa visits Constantinople (Istanbul) on the business of the Venetian Republic, obtains the release of Isabella and Atalide, and by his persuasions they both take the veil.

== Sources ==
- Ashbee, Henry Spencer [Pisanus Fraxi] (1885). Catena Librorum Tacendorum. London: privately printed. pp. 130–2.
- Colligan, Colette (2006). "Harems and London's Underground Print Culture". The Traffic in Obscenity from Byron to Beardsley. Palgrave Macmillan. pp. 52–3.
