= Mary Brayton Woodbridge =

American temperance reformer and editor (1830–1894)

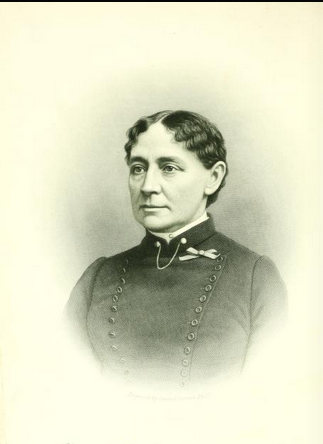
- Photo in A Woman of the Century
- Born: Mary Ann Brayton; April 21, 1830; Nantucket, Massachusetts, U.S.
- Died: October 25, 1894 (aged 64)
- Occupations: temperance reformer, editor
- Spouse: Frederick Wells Woodbridge (m. 1847)
- Relatives: Maria Mitchell
- Writing career
- Literary movement: temperance movement

Signature
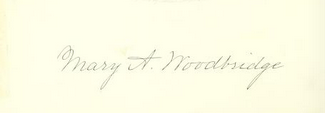

Mary Brayton Woodbridge (April 21, 1830 – October 25, 1894) was an American temperance reformer and editor. She was the first president of the local temperance union of her home town at Ravenna; then for years, president of her state, Ohio; and in 1878, she was chosen recording secretary of the National Woman's Christian Temperance Union (WCTU). Upon the resignation of Judith Ellen Foster at the National WCTU convention in St. Louis, in October, 1884, Woodbridge was unanimously chosen national superintendent of the department of legislation and petitions. In addition to this public effort, and official duties, Woodbridge edited on a weekly basis several columns of the Commonwealth, a temperance paper. She also edited the Amendment Herald, which, under her leadership, attained a weekly circulation of 100,000 copies.

== Early years and education ==
Mary Ann Brayton was born April 21, 1830, in Nantucket, Massachusetts. She was the daughter of Captain Isaac Brayton and his wife, Love Mitchell Brayton. Her mother belonged to the family of Maria Mitchell, the astronomer. Woodbridge was the sixth generation born in the United States, and her ancestry can be traced back in England for a period of 800 years.

Woodbridge received a fair educational training, and in youth, she excelled in mathematics. When she was six years old, Horace Mann, the educator of Massachusetts, passed a day in Nantucket examining the public schools. To his delight, the little girl went through the multiplication table backward and forward up to the twenties. When she had finished, he laid his hand kindly on her head and said: 'Well, my child, if you persevere you will be a noted woman.'

She was nine years old when her family removed to Ravenna, Ohio, from which time she studied either under private instructors or in a private school in Hudson, Ohio. She was converted at the age of 14.

== Career ==
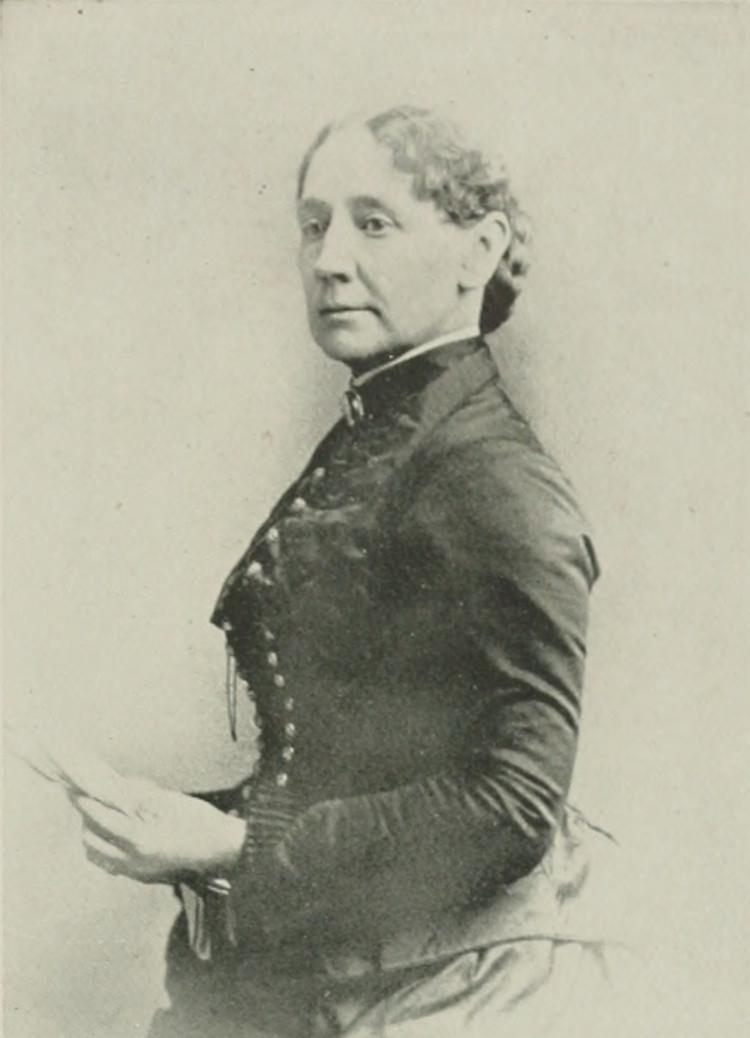
Mary Woodbridge

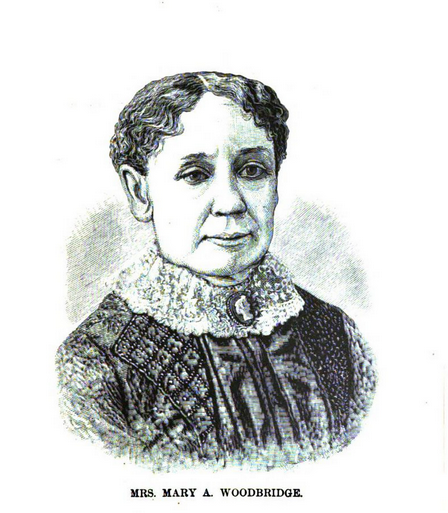
Mary Woodbridge

In 1847, at the age of seventeen, she married Frederick Wells Woodbridge, a merchant, whom she met while living in Ravenna, Ohio. They settled in Cleveland, Ohio. By around the age of 20, she became a mother of three children: Mary Alice, Martha Mitchell, and George Brayton; Frederick W. died at age one. However, Woodbridge never lost her enthusiasm for books or knowledge. She took lessons in German and French, and recited in her own house while holding one of her children on her knee and quieting another at her side. She was at that time presiding over a family of 12, having the entire management of her domestic affairs and performing many of the commonest duties herself.

For the first six years of her married life, Woodbridge lived at Ravenna; then the family moved to Newburgh, which became a part of Cleveland, where for 20 years she lived the life of a cultured Christian matron. She was too busy to do much literary work, but she was interested in everything that tended to elevate society. She was the secretary of a literary club in Cleveland, over which General James A. Garfield presided upon his frequent visits to that city.

She was particularly interested in temperance work and, when the crusade opened, she took a leading part in that movement. She joined the WCTU, and filled many important offices in that organization. She was the first president of the local union of her own home, Ravenna, then for years president of her State, and in 1878 she was chosen recording secretary of the National WCTU.

Around 1882, the Woodbridges returned to Ravenna, where she returned to her previous uneventful life. Then the Women's Crusade came and in common with thousands of other women of Ohio, she felt compelled join the temperance movement. She went to her closet, and there, when alone with her god, heard a voice asking,'Whom shall I send?'. She responded, 'Here am I; I will be or do whatever pleaseth Thee.' Upon the resignation of Judith Ellen Foster, in the St. Louis National WCTU convention, in October, 1884, Woodbridge was unanimously chosen national superintendent of the department of legislation and petitions. Her most important work was done in her conduct of the constitutional amendment campaign. She edited the Amendment Herald, which gained a weekly circulation of 100,000 copies. From 1878, she was annually re-elected recording secretary of the national WCTU. In 1889, she attended the world's convention in England.

Woodbridge died October 25, 1894.
