= Robert Cumming (art historian) =

Art historian

Robert Alexander Cumming (born May 1945) is professor of the history of art at Boston University. He worked for the Tate Gallery, London, before moving to Christie's auction house where he founded the education department. After he retired from Christie's he joined Boston University. Cumming is a prolific author of art history books aimed at young people and beginners. His edited edition of the letters between Bernard Berenson and Kenneth Clark is published by Yale University Press.

== Early life ==
Robert Cumming was born in May 1945. He received his advanced education at Trinity Hall, Cambridge, where he studied law. He qualified as a barrister and began to practice but returned to Trinity Hall to study art history.

== Career ==
Cumming worked in the education department of the Tate Gallery, London, before moving to Christie's auction house in 1978 where he founded Christie's Education which continues to offer graduate programmes in London and New York, and non-degree programmes in London, Paris, New York and Melbourne. He retired from Christie's in 2000, after which he was responsible for the Boston University Study Abroad London Centre from 2004 to 2012 before becoming professor of art history with the university.

== Writing ==
Cumming is a prolific author and is particularly known for his association with Dorling Kindersley for whom he has written many introductory level and explanatory works of art history. First inspired by his interactions with novices and young people during his time at the Tate Gallery. His subsequent experience in teaching adults and students of all ages has resulted in over a dozen books. His books have been translated into over 20 languages, have sold over one million copies, and been awarded literary prizes in the UK, Holland and Italy.

His knowledge of connoisseurship came to the fore in his 2015 edited edition of the correspondence between Bernard Berenson and Kenneth Clark, published by Yale University Press, which was positively reviewed.

== Personal life ==
Cumming lives in Buckinghamshire and is married to Carolyn. The couple have two daughters, Chloe and Phoebe.

== Selected publications ==
- Just look: A book about paintings. Kestrel, Harmondsworth, 1979. ISBN 0722656769
- Just imagine: Ideas in painting. Kestrel, Harmondsworth, 1982. ISBN 0722658230
- Christie's guide to collecting. Phaidon, Oxford, 1984. (Editor) ISBN 071488006X
- Discovering Turner. Tate Publishing, London, 1990. ISBN 1854370391
- Annotated art. Dorling Kindersley, London, 1995. ISBN 0751301582
- Great artists. Dorling Kindersley, London, 1998. ISBN 075130445X
- ART: The no-nonsense guide to art and artists. Everyman, London, 2001. ISBN 1841590444
- Art. Dorling Kindersley, London, 2005. (Eyewitness Companions series) ISBN 1405310545
- Great artists explained. Dorling Kindersley, London, 2007. ISBN 978-0756628703
- Art explained: The world's greatest paintings explored and explained. Dorling Kindersley, London, 2008. ISBN 9781405335263
- Art: A visual history. Dorling Kindersley, 2015. ISBN 978-0241186107
- My Dear BB ...: The letters of Bernard Berenson and Kenneth Clark, 1925-1959. Yale University Press, New Haven, 2015. ISBN 978-0300207378
