= The Exclusives (novel) =

1830 novel

- Author: Lady Charlotte Bury
- Language: English
- Genre: Silver Fork
- Publisher: Colburn and Bentley
- Publication date: 1830
- Publication place: United Kingdom
- Media type: Print

The Exclusives is an 1830 novel by the British writer Lady Charlotte Bury, originally published in three volumes. It is part of the then-popular genre of silver fork novels set in high society. It was also published in New York City by Harper the same year in two rather than three volumes. Although the daughter of a duke herself Bury, writing anonymously, used it as an expose of the manners and behaviour of the elite Ton.

== Synopsis ==
It contains three alternating subplots including that of the politician Lord Glenmore who neglects his wife to concentrate on politics. Inexperienced in high society, she is targeted for seduction by Leslie Winyard. While it seems she has been compromised, she is in fact innocent, and he forgives her and resigns his political post so they can leave fashionable circles and live more happily together in the country.

== Bibliography ==
- Copeland, Edward. The Silver Fork Novel: Fashionable Fiction in the Age of Reform. Cambridge University Press, 2012.
- Wilson, Cheryl A. Fashioning the Silver Fork Novel. Routledge, 6 October 2015.
