= David Robert Sime Cumming =

David Robert Sime Cumming from the University of Glasgow, Glasgow, UK, was named Fellow of the Institute of Electrical and Electronics Engineers (IEEE) in 2013 for contributions to integrated sensors and microsystem technology. He was elected a Fellow of the Royal Academy of Engineering (FREng) in 2017.
