= Gordon-Cumming baronets =

Baronetcy in the Baronetage of the United Kingdom

Coat of Arms of the Cumming of Altyre, Chief of the Name and Arms of Clan Cumming

The Cumming-Gordon, later Gordon-Cumming Baronetcy, of Altyre near Forres, is a title in the Baronetage of the United Kingdom. It was created on 27 May 1804 for Alexander Cumming-Gordon, formerly member of parliament for Inverness Burghs. The Cumyn or Cumming family had been settled in Scotland since the 12th century. One member of the family, John II Comyn, Lord of Badenoch, married Eleanor, sister of King John of Scotland. Their son John III Comyn, Lord of Badenoch, known as the "Red Comyn", was a claimant to the Scottish throne through his mother. A later member of the family, Robert Cumming, 13th of Altyre, married Lucy, daughter of Sir Ludovic Gordon of Gordonstoun. Their great-grandson was the first Baronet, who assumed the additional surname of Gordon on succeeding to the Gordon of Gordonstoun estates. The second Baronet sat as Member of Parliament for Elgin Burghs. He changed the family surname from Cumming-Gordon to Gordon-Cumming. The fourth Baronet is best known as a central figure in the Royal Baccarat Scandal.

Charlotte Gordon Cumming is the daughter of the sixth Baronet. The family seat is Altyre, near Forres, Moray.

== Cumming-Gordon, later Gordon-Cumming baronets, of Altyre (1804) ==
- Sir Alexander Penrose Cumming-Gordon, 1st Baronet (1749–1806)
- Sir William Gordon Gordon-Cumming, 2nd Baronet (1787–1854)
- Sir Alexander Penrose Gordon-Cumming, 3rd Baronet (1816–1866)
- Sir William Gordon Gordon-Cumming, 4th Baronet (1848–1930)
- Sir Alexander Penrose Gordon-Cumming, 5th Baronet (1893–1939)
- Sir William Gordon Gordon-Cumming, 6th Baronet (1928–2002)
- Sir Alexander Penrose Gordon-Cumming, 7th Baronet (born 1954)

The heir apparent is the present holder's son William Gordon-Cumming of Altyre (born 1993).

Baronetage of the United Kingdom
Preceded by Mainwaring baronets	Gordon-Cumming baronets of Altyre; 27 May 1804	Succeeded by Maxwell baronets
