= Derwas Cumming =

Australian rules footballer

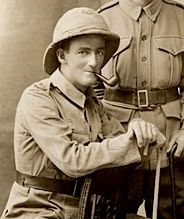

Personal information
- Full name: Derwas Goring Charles Cumming
- Born: 29 September 1891; Millicent, South Australia
- Died: 3 May 1918 (aged 26); Villers-Bretonneux, France
- Original team: Christian Brothers' College
- Position: Forward

Playing career
Years	Club	Games (Goals)
1907–10; 1914	Perth (WAFL)	51 (?)
1911–12	University (VFL)	21 (34)

Derwas Goring Charles "Dave" Cumming MC (29 September 1891 – 3 May 1918) was an Australian rules footballer and soldier who was killed in the First World War.

Born in Millicent, South Australia, Cumming moved to Western Australia with his family at an early age. He made his senior debut for the Perth Football Club in the West Australian Football League (WAFL) at the age of 15, while still a high school student. In 1911, Cumming moved to Melbourne to attend the University of Melbourne, playing two seasons for the University Football Club in the Victorian Football League (VFL). He then returned to Perth and played one final WAFL season in 1914. Cumming enlisted in the Australian Imperial Force the same year, and served in the Gallipoli Campaign and on the Western Front. He was awarded the Military Cross in 1917, and received a bar the following year. He died of wounds after the Second Battle of Villers-Bretonneux.

== Early life ==
=== Family ===
Cumming was born in Millicent, South Australia, on 29 September 1891, the second of five children born to Catherine Frances Henrietta (née Jones), and Charles Walter Cumming. Both his parents were of English origin.

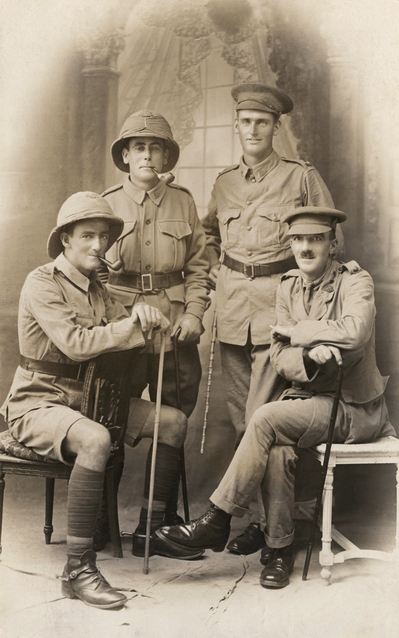
Cumming (far left) and his brother, Lieutenant Redmond Cumming (far right), in 1916, along with two other unidentified Australian soldiers.

Cumming's uncle, Brigadier General Michael Derwas Goring-Jones, CMG, DSO, died as a consequence of poison gas in May 1919.

Cumming's older brother, Redmond Harry Owen Cumming, had been taken as a prisoner of war in April 1917. Unable to cope with his wartime experiences, he poisoned himself in March 1922, two months before the birth of a daughter.

=== Education ===
At a young age, his family returned to Perth, Western Australia (Charles Cumming's hometown). There, he attended the Christian Brothers' College on St Georges Terrace, serving as a prefect in 1909. According to The West Australian, Cumming was "one of the best known and most popular of the boys attending the secondary schools of Western Australia".

At school, he excelled at both cricket and football, captaining the college's cricket team in 1909. The following year, he was named Champion Athlete at the combined athletics carnival of the Public Schools Association, after winning the 100-yard race, 220-yard race, the 440-yard race, the 120-yard hurdles, the high jump, and the long jump.

== Football career ==
=== Perth (WAFL) ===
While playing for the school football team, Cumming caught the eye of recruiters from the Perth Football Club in the West Australian Football League (WAFL), and subsequently made his debut against East Perth on 22 June 1907.

Cumming did not play in Perth's grand final over East Fremantle in September 1907, in which they recorded their first premiership, but did play in the losing grand finals in 1908 and 1909.

He was aged 15 years and 273 days on his debut, making him one of only four people confirmed to have played senior WAFL football before their sixteenth birthday, along with Stan Hussey, Anthony Forrest, and Stan Magro. In 1941, when asked to rank Perth Football Club champion players over the preceding 30 years,

"[club stalwart, Roy] White chose Derwas Cumming as Perth's best half-forward. He was a great footballer at Christian Brothers' College, and while still at school played for Perth. Even at that age he distinguished himself. Unfortunately, he was one who left the playing field for the battle field and was killed." Western Mail, Thursday, 7 August 1941.

=== University (VFL) ===
After graduating from Christian Brothers' College in 1910, he left Western Australia to attend Trinity College at the University of Melbourne. While at the university, Cumming played a number for the University Football Club in the Victorian Football League (VFL), during which time he was generally referred to by his nickname, "Dave".

He played a total of 21 games for the club, kicking 34 goals, before returning to Perth after the completion of his degree. Cumming's best performance for University was five goals against Geelong in the last match of the 1911 season, out of only seven goals for the team. He finished the 1912 season with 17 goals from 10 games, second only to Bert Hartkopf for the club. This included two goals in University's round-three defeat of Richmond, the only win of Cumming's VFL career.

== Military career and death ==
Working for a time at Yalkin, his mother's farm at Doodlakine, Cumming enlisted in the Australian Army in September 1914.

He left Australia on the transport ship Medic in November 1914 as a private in the 1st Divisional Ammunition Column, but transferred to the 16th Battalion in October 1915, where he served in the Gallipoli Campaign. Cumming transferred to the 48th Battalion in March 1916, as a second lieutenant, and was sent to serve on the Western Front with his unit. He was wounded in action at the Battle of Pozières, which necessitated a period of recovery in England, but was promoted to the rank of lieutenant before his return to France.

Cumming was again promoted, to captain, in April 1917, and in June of the same year was awarded the Military Cross for "conspicuous gallantry and ability in handling two companies of his Battalion participating in the attack", which occurred during "operations for capture of objective east of Messines on June 7th to 9th 1917." It was also noted: "[t]his officer's quick appreciation of the situation and prompt and effective action was greatly responsible for the consolidation and final success." He was also recommended for the Distinguished Service Order, but did not receive the award, possibly due to his rank.

In April 1918, Cumming received a Bar to the Military Cross, for "conspicuous gallantry and devotion to duty in command of a flank company". He had "repeatedly repulsed" the enemy, then "protected the left, bringing very heavy fire onto the enemy", fighting a "brilliant rear guard action until the battalion was established in fresh positions."

Cumming died of wounds after the Second Battle of Villers-Bretonneux, on 3 May 1918. It was originally believed he was buried at the Australian-British Cemetery, but in 1923 it was discovered the site supposed to be his grave was marked with a military cross, rather than a grave marker. However, his name is included on the Villers–Bretonneux Australian National Memorial.

== See also ==
- List of Victorian Football League players who died on active service
