= David Cumming =

Scottish footballer

Personal information
- Full name: David Scott Cumming
- Date of birth: 6 May 1910
- Place of birth: Aberdeen, Scotland
- Date of death: 18 April 1993 (aged 82)
- Place of death: Kirriemuir, Scotland
- Position: Goalkeeper

Youth career
- Hall Russells

Senior career*
Years	Team	Apps	(Gls)
1930–1934	Aberdeen	13	(0)
1934–1936	Arbroath	81	(0)
1936–1947	Middlesbrough	135	(0)

International career
1938	Scotland	1	(0)
1944	Scotland (wartime)	1	(0)
- * Club domestic league appearances and goals

David Scott Cumming (6 May 1910 – 18 April 1993) was a Scottish footballer, who played as a goalkeeper for Aberdeen, Arbroath and Middlesbrough. Cumming represented Scotland once, in a 1–0 victory against England at Wembley in 1938.

Middlesbrough signed Cumming from Scottish club Arbroath for £3,000 in 1936. His career was interrupted by the Second World War, but he returned to play for Middlesbrough during the 1946–47 season. During that season he was sent off in a game against Arsenal for punching Leslie Compton. Cumming was forced to retire at the end of the 1946–47 season after operations failed to cure a knee injury.
