= Eliza Maria Gordon-Cumming =

Scottish aristocrat, horticulturalist, palaeontologist (1795-1842)

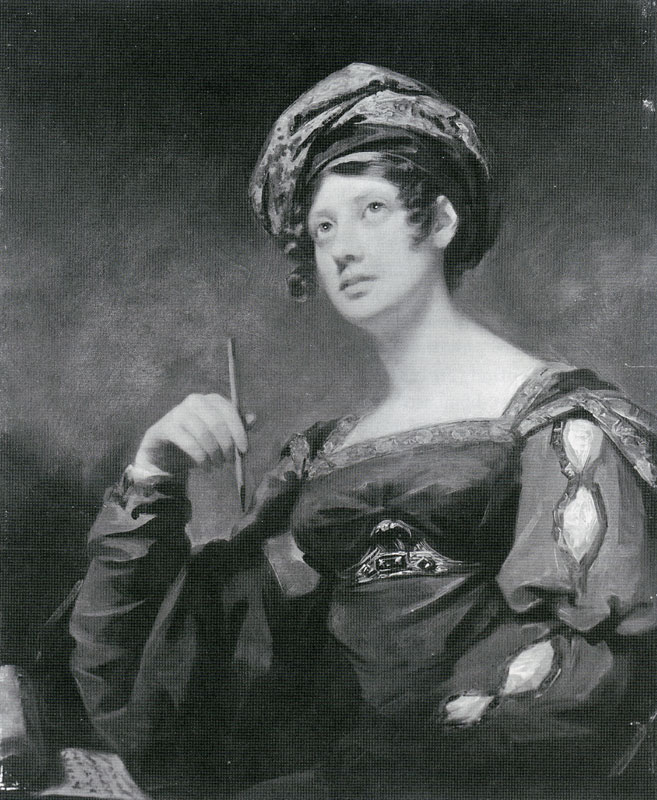
- Portrait by Henry Raeburn, between 1815 and 1823
- Born: Eliza Maria Campbell; 1795; Inveraray, Scotland
- Died: 21 April 1842 (aged 46–47); Altyre, near Inverness, Scotland
- Spouse: Sir William Gordon-Cumming, 2nd Baronet
- Children: 13, including Roualeyn and Constance
- Scientific career
- Fields: Paleontology, scientific illustration

Eliza Maria, Lady Gordon-Cumming (née Campbell; 1795 – 21 April 1842) was a Scottish aristocrat, horticulturalist, palaeontologist and scientific illustrator. Lady Gordon-Cumming collected and studied Devonian fish fossils from the Old Red Sandstone of Morayshire, Scotland. She amassed a large and well-known collection which she illustrated, along with her daughter Lady Anne Seymour. Lady Gordon-Cumming worked with other palaeontologists and geologists of the time including Louis Agassiz, William Buckland and Roderick Murchison.

== Biography ==
=== Early life ===
Lady Gordon-Cumming was born Eliza Maria Campbell in 1795 in Inveraray to Lady Charlotte Campbell (later Lady Charlotte Bury) and Colonel John Campbell. Her mother was a diarist and novelist and father a soldier and politician.

=== Palaeontological research ===
Lady Gordon-Cumming was a skilled painter and keen horticulturalist who took up the study of the fossils on her Altyre estate near the Moray Firth around 1839. She collected fossils and instructed workers in the quarries on the estate to bring her any they found. She collected a large number of specimens of fossil fish from the Devonian period and began a correspondence with the most famous geologists of the time; Louis Agassiz, William Buckland and Roderick Murchison all visited her collection in Scotland. She sent illustrations, letters and specimens around Europe, and intended to publish her illustrations and theories on how these fish would have appeared in life. Some of these illustrations survive in the archives of the Geological Society. Some of her ideas about how the fossil remains should be interpreted were later discredited as more fossil evidence came to light, but her illustrations were highly respected. Her work was praised by Hugh Miller, and

...collected these remains and distributed them amongst geologists with the greatest liberality. Lady Cumming had studied the remains with great care, and prepared a series of drawings of all the most perfect specimens with a precision of detail and artistic talent, which few naturalists can hope to attain"

After his visit to Altyre, Agassiz named a species Cheirolepis cummingae (also sometimes spelled cummingii) in honour of Cumming. This species name was later discovered to be a synonym of Cheirolepis trialli. Many of the fossils in Cumming's collection were personally identified by Agassiz, and the collection is now held by the National Museum of Scotland, the Natural History Museum, London, and the University of Neuchatel.

=== Marriage and children ===
Lady Gordon-Cumming married Sir William Gordon Gordon-Cumming of Altyre, 2nd Baronet in 1815. They had 13 children including

- Sir Alexander Penrose Gordon-Cumming, 3rd Baronet (1816–1866)
- Roualeyn George Gordon-Cumming (15 March 1820 – 24 March 1866) traveller, sportsman and lion hunter
- Francis Hastings Toone Gordon-Cumming (1842–1883)
- Anne Seymour Conway Baker Cresswell (d. 1858)
- Mary Elizabeth Gordon-Cumming
- Henry Gordon-Cumming (b. 1822)
- John Randolph Gordon-Cumming (1826–1866)
- William Gordon Gordon-Cumming (1829–1898)
- Adelaide Eliza Gordon-Cumming (d.1870)
- Alice Henrietta Gordon-Cumming (d. 1859)
- Constance Frederica “Eka” Gordon-Cumming (26 May 1837 – 4 September 1924) travel writer and painter
- Eleanora Gordon-Cumming (b. 1842 d. 1889)

=== Death ===
During her 13th pregnancy Gordon-Cumming was impatient to get back to her studies, writing to Roderick Murchison "I am breathless to be at work again." However, she died on 21 April 1842 due to complications following the birth.

== See also ==
- Timeline of women in science
