= Andrew Cumming =

British Army general

Major General Andrew Cumming CBE
- Military career
- Allegiance: United Kingdom
- Branch: British Army
- Service years: 1967–2004
- Rank: Major General
- Commands: Colonel, Queen's Royal Lancers
- Conflicts: Kosovo War
- Awards: Commander of the Order of the British Empire
- Other work: Controller, SSAFA Forces Help

Major General Andrew Alexander John Rennie Cumming CBE is a retired British Army officer who served in the Balkans as part of the NATO-led Kosovo Force (KFOR). After leaving the Army in 2004, Cumming took up the position of Controller at SSAFA Forces Help, a volunteer organisation set up to help serving and former British service personnel.

== Military career ==
Cumming attended the Royal Military Academy Sandhurst and was commissioned on 15 December 1967 as a second lieutenant in the 17th/21st Lancers before promotion to lieutenant on 15 June 1969. He was promoted to captain on 15 December 1973, major on 30 September 1981, lieutenant colonel on 30 June 1987, colonel on 30 June 1991 and brigadier on 31 December 1991 with seniority from 30 June 1991. He deployed to the Balkans in 1992 as the commander of the first British contingent of troops serving in Croatia under UN auspices and was appointed Commander of the Most Excellent Order of the British Empire on 12 June 1993 "in recognition of service during operations in the former Republic of Yugoslavia". He went on to serve as Commander of Recruit Training in 1996 and was promoted to the substantive rank of major general on 5 September 2002. Cumming was given the honorary appointment of Colonel, Queen's Royal Lancers on 14 May 2006.

Cumming retired from active service on 8 June 2004 and was appointed to the Reserve of Officers at the rank of major general.

== SSAFA Forces Help ==
After retirement from the British Army, Cumming took up the position of Controller at the Soldiers, Sailors, Airmen and Families Association, a charity which supports serving and former British servicemen and their families, in April 2004. Cumming was invited to apply for the position while serving in the Balkans, negotiating the demilitarisation of the Kosovo Liberation Army. Speaking in November 2004, Cumming explained that "the end of my first life, my military life, was approaching. I was delighted to be asked to tender my abilities to SSAFA - Forces Help. More importantly, I was thrilled to be told I had got the job."
