= Sir William Gordon-Cumming, 2nd Baronet =

British Member of Parliament

Sir William Gordon Gordon-Cumming, 2nd Baronet of Altyre and Gordonstoun FRSE (20 July 1787 – 25 November 1854), was a British Member of Parliament. Gordon-Cumming was member of parliament (MP) for Elgin Burghs from 1831 to 1832.

== Life ==
He was born on 20 July 1787, the son of Alexander Penrose Cumming, 1st baronet of Altyre, and his wife, Helen Grant.

In 1828 Gordon-Cumming was elected a Fellow of the Royal Society of Edinburgh, his proposer being Sir John Hay. Gordon-Cumming resigned in 1832.

== Family ==
He married twice, first in 1815 to Eliza Maria Campbell (died 1842), the oldest daughter of Colonel John Campbell of Shawfield and Islay, with whom he had seven sons and six daughters.

He remarried in 1846 to Jane Eliza Mackintosh (died 1897), daughter of William Mackintosh of Geddes, Nairn, with whom he had one son and two daughters.

Parliament of the United Kingdom
| Preceded by Alexander Duff | Member of Parliament for Elgin Burghs; 1831–1832 | Succeeded by Sir Andrew Leith Hay |
Baronetage of the United Kingdom
| Preceded by Alexander Penrose Cumming-Gordon | Baronet (of Altyre); 1806–1854 | Succeeded by Alexander Penrose Gordon-Cumming |
