= General Colville =

General Colville may refer to:

- Charles Colville (1770–1843), British Army general
- Edward Colville (1905–1982), British Army major general

== See also ==
- Henry Edward Colvile (1852–1907), British Army major general
