= Viscount Younger of Leckie =

Viscountcy in the Peerage of the United Kingdom

Viscount Younger of Leckie, of Alloa in the County of Clackmannan, is a title in the Peerage of the United Kingdom. It was created on 20 February 1923 for the Unionist politician Sir George Younger, 1st Baronet. He had already been created a Baronet, of Leckie in the County of Clackmannan, in the Baronetage of the United Kingdom, on 12 July 1911. His grandson, the third Viscount, served as Lord Lieutenant of Stirlingshire (renamed Stirling and Falkirk in 1975) from 1964 to 1979, whilst the third Viscount's brother was Labour MP Kenneth Younger. His son, the fourth Viscount, was a prominent Conservative politician. In 1992, five years before he succeeded his father, he was created a life peer as Baron Younger of Prestwick, of Ayr in the District of Kyle and Carrick.

As of 2026, the titles are held by his son, the fifth Viscount, who succeeded in 2003 and joined the House of Lords as an elected hereditary peer in 2010.

The family seat is Leckie House, near Gargunnock, Stirlingshire.

== Viscount Younger of Leckie (1923) ==
- George Younger, 1st Viscount Younger of Leckie (1851–1929)
- James Younger, 2nd Viscount Younger of Leckie (1880–1946)
- Edward George Younger, 3rd Viscount Younger of Leckie (1906–1997)
- George Kenneth Hotson Younger, 4th Viscount Younger of Leckie (1931–2003)
- James Edward George Younger, 5th Viscount Younger of Leckie (born 1955)

The heir apparent is the present holder's son, the Hon. Alexander William George Younger (born 1993).

== Line of succession ==
- George Younger, 1st Viscount Younger of Leckie (1851–1929)
  - James Younger, 2nd Viscount Younger of Leckie (1880–1946)
    - Edward George Younger, 3rd Viscount Younger of Leckie (1906–1997)
      - George Kenneth Hotson Younger, 4th Viscount Younger of Leckie, Baron Younger of Prestwick (1931–2003)
        - James Edward George Younger, 5th Viscount Younger of Leckie (born 1955)
          - (1) Hon. Alexander William George Younger (born 1993)
        - (2) Hon. Charles Gerald Alexander Younger (born 1959)
          - (3) Geordie Charles Kenneth Younger (born 1997)
        - (4) Hon. Andrew Seymour Robert Younger (born 1962)
      - Hon. Alexander James Younger (1933–2016)
        - (5) Nicholas Gerald Gilmour Younger (born 1963)
        - (6) Rupert Edward Alexander Younger (born 1966)
          - (7) Alec Gilmour Younger (born 1998)
      - Hon. Robert Edward Gilmour Younger (1940–2012)
        - (8) Fergus Robert Younger (born 1975)
    - Hon. Kenneth Gilmour Younger (1908–1976)
      - (9) (James) Samuel Younger (born 1951)
        - (10) Edward Kenneth Spencer Younger (born 1986)

== Arms ==
Coat of arms of Viscount Younger of Leckie
Crest An Armed Leg couped at the thigh proper garnished and spurred Or. Escutcheon Parted per saltire Or and Gules a Rose counterchanged in base Martlet Sable on a Chief Azure three Covered Cups Or. Supporters Dexter a Lion rampant Sable, Sinister a Wolf Argent, both armed and langued Gules. Motto Labentibus Junior Annis (Younger as the years go by).

Baronetage of the United Kingdom
Preceded by Osler baronets	Younger baronets of Leckie; 12 July 1911	Succeeded by Lambart baronets
