= Edward Younger, 3rd Viscount Younger of Leckie =

Scottish nobleman

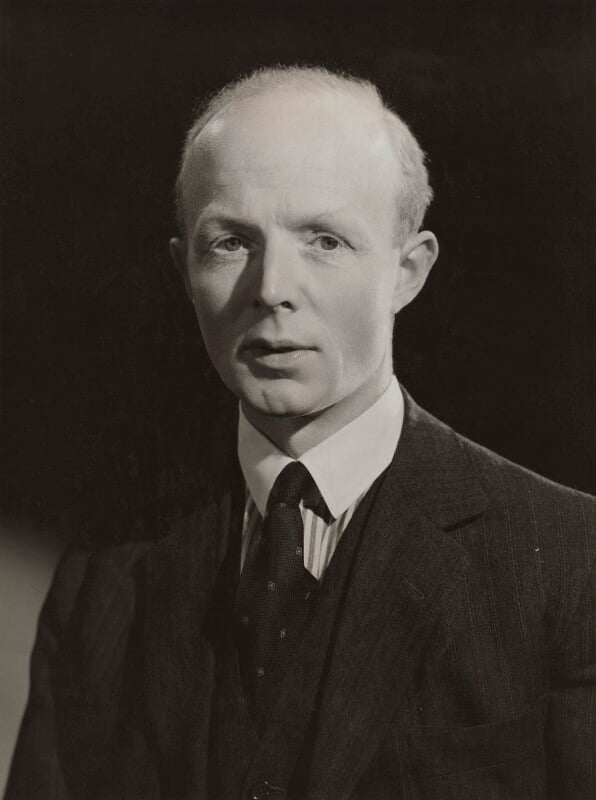
Younger in 1947

Edward George Younger, 3rd Viscount Younger of Leckie (21 November 1906 – 25 June 1997) was a Scottish nobleman.

== Family background ==
Lord Younger of Leckie came from a Scottish family which had been making money from brewing since the 18th century, and which entered the aristocracy in the early years of the 20th century. His great-great-great-great-grandfather, George Younger (baptised 1722), was the founder of the family's brewing business, George Younger and Son. This George Younger's great-great-grandson, also named George Younger (1851-1929), entered politics, and was created Viscount Younger of Leckie in 1923. This peerage has passed in an unbroken line from father to son ever since.

== Birth and early life ==
Younger was the elder son of James Younger, 2nd Viscount Younger of Leckie (1880–1946) by his wife Maud Gilmour (daughter of Sir John Gilmour, 1st Baronet). He was educated at Winchester College and New College, Oxford.

His brother Sir Kenneth Younger was the Labour Member of Parliament for Grimsby 1945–1959.

Honorary titles
Preceded by Sir Ian Bolton	Lord Lieutenant of Stirlingshire; 1964–1975	Office abolished
New title	Lord Lieutenant of Stirling and Falkirk; 1975–1979	Succeeded by Frederick Graham
Peerage of the United Kingdom
Preceded by James Younger	Viscount Younger of Leckie; 1946–1997	Succeeded by George Younger
