= 1888 Ayr Burghs by-election =

1888 British election

The 1888 Ayr Burghs by-election was a parliamentary by-election held for the British House of Commons constituency of Ayr Burghs on 15 June 1888. The seat had become vacant when the sitting Liberal Unionist Member of Parliament, Richard Frederick Fotheringham Campbell, died.

The Liberal candidate, John Sinclair, won the seat in a straight fight with his Liberal Unionist opponent, the Hon Evelyn Ashley.

== Result ==
Ayr Burghs By-election 1888
Party	Candidate	Votes	%	±%
Liberal	John Sinclair	2,321	50.6	+14.7
Liberal Unionist	Hon. Evelyn Ashley	2,268	49.4	−14.7
Majority		53	1.2	N/A
Turnout		4,589	84.1	+7.6
Liberal gain from Liberal Unionist		Swing	+14.7	

== See also ==
- List of United Kingdom by-elections (1885–1900)
