= 1904 Ayr Burghs by-election =

UK parliamentary by-election

- 29 January 1904

Candidate	Dobbie	Younger
Party	Liberal	Conservative
Popular vote	3,221	3,177
Percentage	50.3%	49.7%
MP before election
Charles Orr-Ewing
Conservative
Subsequent MP
George Younger
Conservative

The 1904 Ayr Burghs by-election was a Parliamentary by-election held on 30 January 1904. The constituency returned one Member of Parliament (MP) to the House of Commons of the United Kingdom, elected by the first past the post voting system.

The constituency included the Ayrshire burghs of Ayr and Irvine and the Argyllshire burghs of Campbeltown, Inverary and Oban.

== Vacancy ==
Charles Orr-Ewing had been Unionist MP for the seat of Ayr Burghs since the 1895 general election. He died of heart failure on 24 December 1903 at the age of 43.

== Electoral history ==
The seat had been Unionist since they gained it in 1895. They easily held the seat at the last election, with an increased majority:

General election January 1900
Party	Candidate	Votes	%	±%
Conservative	Charles Orr-Ewing	3,101	55.3	+2.4
Liberal	Edmond Charles Browne	2,511	44.7	−2.4
Majority		590	10.6	+4.8
Turnout		5,612	82.3	−6.6
Conservative hold		Swing	+2.4	

== Candidates ==
The local Unionist Association selected 53-year-old George Younger as their candidate to defend the seat. He was educated at Edinburgh Academy. In 1897, he became chairman of George Younger and Son, the family brewing business.

The local Liberal Association selected 42-year-old Joseph Dobbie as their candidate to gain the seat. He was educated at the Ayr Academy and the University of Edinburgh and was in favour of social reform.

== Campaign ==
Polling day was fixed for 29 January 1904, 36 days after the previous MP died.

The most prominent issue of the day was the campaign that leading Unionist, Joseph Chamberlain was running to get his government to introduce protectionist trade measures. His Tariff Reform League made a habit of taking their message to each by-election that occurred. However, the Unionist candidate, George Younger, was a committed supporter of Free Trade rather than Tariff Reform. The league nevertheless set up operations in the constituency to promote the issue which made the Unionist message in the campaign confusing. Younger, unhappy with their presence, got the Unionist Association Chairman to contact Unionist HQ in London to complain. As a result, the Tariff Reform League ceased campaigning and left the constituency.

== Result ==
The Liberals gained the seat from the Unionists:

Ayr Burghs by-election, 1904
Party	Candidate	Votes	%	±%
Liberal	Joseph Dobbie	3,221	50.3	+5.6
Conservative	George Younger	3,177	49.7	−5.6
Majority		44	0.6	N/A
Turnout		6,398	88.4	+6.1
Liberal gain from Conservative		Swing	+5.6	

The Unionist supporting Spectator magazine concluded that "Whichever way we look at the election, it is impossible to dial cover any evidence of Scotland's conversion to Protection."

== Aftermath ==
At the following general election the Unionists re-gained the seat. The result was:

General election January 1906
Party	Candidate	Votes	%	±%
Conservative	George Younger	3,766	51.8	+2.1
Liberal	Joseph Dobbie	3,505	48.2	−2.1
Majority		261	3.6	N/A
Turnout		7,271	90.5	+2.1
Conservative gain from Liberal		Swing	+2.1	
