= 1890 Ayr Burghs by-election =

1890 British election

The 1890 Ayr Burghs by-election was a parliamentary by-election held for the British House of Commons constituency of Ayr Burghs in 1890. The seat had become vacant when the sitting Liberal Party Member of Parliament John Sinclair retired.

The Conservative candidate, James Somervell won the seat.

== Result ==
By-election, 1890: Ayr Burghs
Party	Candidate	Votes	%	±%
Conservative	James Somervell	2,610	51.3	−12.8
Liberal	E. Routledge	2,480	48.7	+12.8
Majority		130	2.6	N/A
Turnout		5,090	87.8	+11.3
Registered electors		5,798		
Conservative gain from Liberal		Swing	−12.8	

== See also ==
- List of United Kingdom by-elections (1885–1900)
