= Frederick Graham (British Army officer) =

British Army general

Major-General Frederick Graham CB DSO
- Born: 14 December 1908
- Died: 9 May 1988 (aged 79)
- Military career
- Allegiance: United Kingdom
- Branch: British Army
- Rank: Major-General
- Service number: 41133
- Commands: 61st Lorried Infantry Brigade; 51st (Highland) Division
- Conflicts: Second World War
- Awards: Companion of the Order of the Bath; Distinguished Service Order

Major-General Frederick Clarence Campbell Graham, CB, DSO (14 December 1908 – 9 May 1988) was a senior British Army officer.

== Military career ==
Born the son of Sir (John) Frederick Noble Graham, 2nd Baronet and Irene Maud Campbell, Graham was educated at Eton College and the Royal Military College, Sandhurst. He commissioned into the Argyll and Sutherland Highlanders on 2 February 1929. He served in the Second World War for which he was appointed a Companion of the Distinguished Service Order.

After the war he became commander of the 61st Lorried Infantry Brigade in January 1951, assistant commandant of the Royal Military Academy Sandhurst in August 1953 and deputy commander of the Land Forces in Hong Kong in 1956. He went on to be General Officer Commanding 51st (Highland) Division in March 1959 before retiring in March 1962.

He served as Colonel of the Argyll and Sutherland Highlanders from 1958 to 1972 and as Lord Lieutenant of Stirling and Falkirk from 1979 to 1983.

== Works ==
- Graham, Frederick Clarence Campbell (1948), History of the Argyll & Sutherland Highlanders, 1st Battalion (Princess Louise's) 1939–1945, T. Nelson & Sons

== Family ==
In 1936 he married Phyllis Mary MacMahon; they had three sons.

Military offices
Preceded by Edward Colville	GOC 51st (Highland) Division; 1959–1962	Succeeded by Derek Lang
Honorary titles
Preceded by The Viscount Younger of Leckie	Lord Lieutenant of Stirling and Falkirk; 1979–1983	Succeeded by James Stirling
