= Joseph Dobbie =

Joseph Dobbie

Sir Joseph Dobbie (1862 – 18 May 1943) was a British Liberal Party politician.

== Biography ==
He was a son of James Dobbie. He was educated at the Ayr Academy and the University of Edinburgh

He was a Liberal in favour of social reform. He gained a parliamentary seat from the Unionists at the Ayr Burghs by-election of 1904.

He was a Member of the Departmental Committee on Housing in 1908. He was Chairman of the Royal Scots Recruiting Committee from 1914 to 1916. He attempted a return to parliament after a 12-year break, without success, when he contested Edinburgh Central at the 1918 general election.

He sat as Liberal MP for Ayr Burghs from 1904 to 1906, but lost the seat back to the Unionist at the January 1906 general election.

He did not stand for parliament again. Dobbie was knighted in the 1920 Birthday Honours for public and local services in Edinburgh. He was Head of Dalgleish, Dobbie & Co., SSC, Edinburgh. He was a Justice of the Peace in the City of Edinburgh. He was a Legal Member of the Edinburgh Military Tribunal. He was President of the Scottish Vernacular Association.

== Election results ==
1904 Ayr Burghs by-election
Party	Candidate	Votes	%	±%
Liberal	Joseph Dobbie	3,221	50.3	+5.6
Unionist	George Younger	3,177	49.7	−5.6
Turnout			88.4	+2.1
Majority		44	0.6	11.2
Liberal gain from Unionist		Swing	+5.6	

General election January 1906
Party	Candidate	Votes	%	±%
Unionist	George Younger	3,766	51.8	+2.1
Liberal	Joseph Dobbie	3,505	48.2	−2.1
Turnout			90.5	+2.1
Majority		261	3.6	4.2
Unionist gain from Liberal		Swing	+2.1	

General election 1918: Edinburgh Central
Party	Candidate	Votes	%	±%
Labour	William Graham	7,159	51.3	
Liberal	Joseph Dobbie	6,795	48.7	
Turnout				
Majority		364	2.6	
Labour gain from Liberal		Swing		

== Sources ==
- Who Was Who
- British parliamentary election results 1885–1918, Craig, F. W. S.

Parliament of the United Kingdom
Preceded by Charles Lindsay Orr-Ewing	Member of Parliament for Ayr Burghs; 1904–1906	Succeeded by George Younger
