= Richard Campbell (Liberal MP) =

Richard Frederick Fotheringham Campbell (September 1831 – 27 May 1888) was a British army officer and Liberal Party (later Liberal Unionist) politician who sat in the House of Commons from 1880 to 1888.

== Biography ==
Campbell was the son of James Campbell of Craigie, Ayrshire and his wife Grace Elizabeth Hay, daughter of General Archibald Hay, K.C.B. His family was said to be descended from the Campbell of Auchinbreck. He was educated at Rugby School and served as a captain in the 8th Madras Cavalry. He was Vice-Lieutenant of Ayrshire and Lieutenant-colonel in the Ayrshire Yeomanry Cavalry.

In the 1880 general election, Campbell was elected as the Member of Parliament (MP) for the Ayr Burghs. He was re-elected in 1885, but when the Liberals split over Irish Home Rule, he joined the breakaway Liberal Unionist Party. He was re-elected for the unionists at the 1886 election, and held the seat until his death at the age of 56 in 1888.

In 1869 Campbell married Arabella Jane Hay, widow of Charles Parker Tennent and daughter of Archibald Argyll Hay. Their son James Archibald Campbell was born 30 July 1872, succeeded his father in 1888 and served as a JP and DL.

Parliament of the United Kingdom
Preceded by William Montgomery-Cuninghame	Member of Parliament for Ayr Burghs; 1880–1888	Succeeded by John Sinclair
