= Charles Younger (cricketer) =

Scottish cricketer and British Army officer (1885–1917)

Personal information
- Full name: Charles Frearson Younger
- Born: 9 September 1885; Tillicoultry, Clackmannanshire, Scotland
- Died: 21 March 1917 (aged 31); Aveluy, Somme, France
- Batting: Unknown
- Bowling: Left-arm medium

Domestic team information
- Years: Team
- 1907: Oxford University
- 1912: Scotland

Career statistics
Competition	First-class
Matches	2
Runs scored	42
Batting average	21.00
100s/50s	–/–
Top score	27
Balls bowled	204
Wickets	4
Bowling average	18.75
5 wickets in innings	–
10 wickets in match	–
Best bowling	2/18
Catches/stumpings	3/–
- Source: Cricinfo, 29 March 2021

Charles Frearson Younger (9 September 1885 – 21 March 1917) was a Scottish first-class cricketer and British Army officer.

The son of the brewer and politician Sir George Younger, and his wife, Lucy, he was born in Tillicoultry, Clackmannanshire. He was educated in England at Cheam School, before attending Winchester College. He was a member of the Winchester cricket team and was considered a bowler of good length. Younger then studied at New College, Oxford. He made a single appearance in first-class cricket for Oxford University against the Marylebone Cricket Club in 1907, taking two wickets in the match and scoring 27 runs. He was absent on the first day of the match, leaving Oxford a man short in their first innings. Younger made no further appearances for Oxford and failed to gain a blue.

After graduating from Oxford, he entered into his father's brewing business in Alloa, George Younger and Son, assisting with its management. Younger was commissioned as a second lieutenant in the Lothians and Border Horse in December 1909. A member of the Clackmannanshire county cricket team, he was selected to play for Scotland in a first-class match against the touring South Africans at Glasgow in 1912. He scored 15 runs in the match and took two wickets with his left-arm medium pace.

Younger was commissioned as an army officer and served in the First World War, during which he was promoted to lieutenant in August 1914. Younger was seriously wounded in action at Saint-Léger on 20 March 1917, rendering him unconscious. He succumbed to his wounds the following day, having been evacuated to Aveluy. He was buried at the Aveluy Communal Cemetery. Younger was survived by his wife, Marjory, whom he had married in 1913.
