= 1925 Ayr Burghs by-election =

UK Parliamentary by-election

The 1925 Ayr Burghs by-election was held on 12 June 1925. The by-election was held due to the appointment of the incumbent Conservative MP, John Baird, as the Governor-General of Australia.

== Previous election ==
General election 1924: Ayr Burghs Electorate
| Party | Candidate | Votes | % | ±% |
|---|---|---|---|---|
| Unionist | John Baird | 16,153 | 62.3 | +20.5 |
| Labour | J. M. Airlie | 9,787 | 37.7 | +6.0 |
| Majority | | 6,366 | 24.6 | +14.5 |
| Turnout | | 25,940 | 73.5 | +3.5 |
| Unionist hold | | Swing | | |

== Result ==
It was won by the Unionist candidate Thomas Moore.

William Pringle

1925 Ayr Burghs by-election Electorate
| Party | Candidate | Votes | % | ±% |
|---|---|---|---|---|
| Unionist | Thomas Moore | 11,601 | 44.5 | −17.8 |
| Labour | Patrick Dollan | 9,787 | 37.6 | −0.1 |
| Liberal | William Pringle | 4,656 | 17.9 | New |
| Majority | | 1,814 | 6.9 | −17.7 |
| Turnout | | 26,044 | | |
| Unionist hold | | Swing | | |
