= 227th Infantry Brigade (United Kingdom) =

227th (Mixed) Brigade 227th Independent Infantry Brigade (Home) 227th (Highland) Infantry Brigade
- Active: 1917–1919; 1941–1946
- Country: United Kingdom
- Branch: British Army
- Type: Infantry
- Size: Brigade
- Part of: First World War: Home Forces; Second World War: 15th (Scottish) Infantry Division
- Engagements: Battle of Normandy; Operation Epsom; Hill 112; Operation Bluecoat

227th Brigade was an infantry formation of the British Army formed for Home Service under various short-lived titles in the First and the Second World Wars. Later it was upgraded to a field formation composed of Scottish troops, and saw heavy fighting in the Normandy and North West Europe Campaign.

== First World War ==
On the outbreak of the First World War, the Territorial Force (TF) immediately mobilised for home defence, but shortly afterwards (31 August 1914), its units were authorised to raise 2nd battalions formed from those men who had not volunteered for, or were not fit for, overseas service, together with new volunteers, while the 1st Line went overseas to supplement the Regulars. Early in 1915 the 2nd Line TF battalions were raised to full strength to form new divisions, and began to form Reserve (3rd Line) units to supply drafts. The remaining Home Service men were separated out in May 1915 to form brigades of Coast Defence Battalions (termed Provisional Battalions from June 1915).

=== 10th Provisional Brigade ===
10th Provisional Brigade was formed with the following composition:

- 10th Provisional Cyclist Company formed in July 1915 from the home service details of 2/1st Northern Cyclist Battalion
- 21st Provisional Battalion formed on 26 May 1915 at Long Benton, Northumberland, as Northern Coast Defence Battalion from home service details of the 4th and 7th Battalions of the Northumberland Fusiliers. Name changed to 21st Provisional Battalion on 10 June 1915.
- 84th Provisional Battalion formed in June 1915 from home service details of the 4th, 5th, 6th, 7th and 8th Battalions, Hampshire Regiment
- 85th Provisional Battalion formed at Yeovil in April 1915 from home service details of the South Western Brigade (4th and 5th Battalions, Somerset Light Infantry, 4th Battalion Devonshire Regiment and 4th Battalion Wiltshire Regiment).
- 86th Provisional Battalion formed in August 1915 from home service details of the 5th and 8th Battalions, Duke of Cornwall's Light Infantry and 4th, 5th (Prince of Wales's) and 6th Battalions, Devonshire Regiment.
- 4th Northern Home Battery, Royal Field Artillery, became 10th Provisional Battery RFA in May 1915.
- 10th Provisional Field Company Royal Engineers.
- 10th Provisional Field Ambulance Royal Army Medical Corps, formed from home service details of 3rd Lowland Field Ambulance.
- 839 Horse Transport Company Army Service Corps, formed at Herne Bay, Kent, 23 April 1916, provided the 10th Provisional Brigade Train.

By July 1916 the brigade was at Herne Bay under the control of Southern Army of Central Force.

=== 227th Mixed Brigade ===
The Military Service Act 1916 swept away the Home/Foreign service distinction, and all TF soldiers became liable for overseas service, if medically fit. The Provisional Brigades thus became anomalous, and at the end of 1916 their units became numbered battalions of their parent units. Part of their role was physical conditioning to render men fit for drafting overseas. 10th Provisional Brigade became 227th Mixed Brigade at Herne Bay in December 1916, with its units redesignated as follows:

- 10th Provisional Battery became 1212th (West Riding) Battery, RFA.
- 10th Provisional Field Company became 649th (West Riding) Field Company, RE.
- 21st Provisional Battalion became 35th Battalion, Northumberland Fusiliers on 1 January 1917.
- 84th Provisional Battalion became 17th Battalion, Hampshire Regiment on 1 January 1917.
- 85th Provisional Battalion became 11th Battalion, Somerset Light Infantry on 1 January 1917.
- 86th Provisional Battalion became 15th Battalion, Devonshire Regiment on 1 January 1917.
- 10th Provisional Field Ambulance became 335th Lowland Field Ambulance RAMC.
- 839 HT Company ASC constituted 227 Mixed Brigade Train.

On 26 November 1917, 1212th (WR) Bty transferred to XLIII Brigade, RFA, which was reforming in 67th (2nd Home Counties) Division.

By early 1918 the brigade had moved from Kent to Suffolk, with its HQ at Saxmundham, and was attached to 67th (2nd HC) Division. Here it was joined by the following units:

- 2/25th (Cyclist) Battalion, London Regiment in March 1918.
- 2/1st Welsh (Carnarvonshire) Heavy Battery, Royal Garrison Artillery, joined from 68th (2nd Welsh) Division in May 1918.

In May 1918 each of the Mixed Brigades was called upon to provide a battalion (redesignated a Garrison Guard battalion) to reconstitute the 59th (2nd North Midland) Division, which had been virtually destroyed during the German spring offensive. 227th Mixed Brigade supplied 11th Somerset Light Infantry and immediately raised a new 13th (Home Service) Battalion, Somerset Light Infantry to take over its coast defence duties. The brigade remained with this composition until the end of the war, after which it was demobilised in June 1919.

== Second World War ==
In the Second World War, the brigade number was reactivated for 227th Independent Infantry Brigade (Home). formed within Scottish Command on 15 February 1941, initially for service in the United Kingdom (the suffix '(Home)' was dropped on 1 December 1941). The brigade was always composed of Scottish regiments.

=== Order of Battle ===
The brigade had the following units:

- 7th Battalion, Queen's Own Cameron Highlanders (left 13 October 1941)
- 9th Battalion, Seaforth Highlanders (left 30 November 1942)
- 12th Battalion, Cameronians (Scottish Rifles) (24 February 1941 – 7 May 1942)
- 10th Battalion, Black Watch (Royal Highland Regiment) (4 March 1941 – 18 November 1942)
- 6th Battalion, Highland Light Infantry (7 May 1942 – 18 August 1842)
- Lovat Scouts (30 September 1942 – 9 July 1943)
- 2nd Battalion, Royal Scots (18 November 1942 – 15 March 1943)
- 10th Battalion, Highland Light Infantry (joined 3 December 1942)
- 13th Battalion, Highland Light Infantry (20 January–9 July 1943)
- 4th Battalion, Black Watch (Royal Highland Regiment) (20 June–9 July 1943)
- 2nd Battalion, Argyll and Sutherland Highlanders (previously 15th Battalion, redesignated after 2nd Battalion captured at the fall of Singapore; joined 15 July 1943)
- 2nd Battalion, Gordon Highlanders (previously 15th Battalion, redesignated after 2nd Battalion captured at Singapore; joined 31 July 1943)

During July 1943 three of the brigade's Territorial Army and hostilities-only battalions were replaced by two reconstituted Regular battalions of Highland regiments serving in Orkney, the brigade was redesignated 227th (Highland) Infantry Brigade and assigned to 15th (Scottish) Infantry Division.

=== Commanders ===
The brigade had the following commanders:

- Brigadier G.P. Miller
- Brigadier J.R. Mackintosh-Walker (from 29 July 1942; killed 15 July 1944)
- Brigadier Edward Colville (from 16 July 1944)

=== 'Scottish Corridor' ===
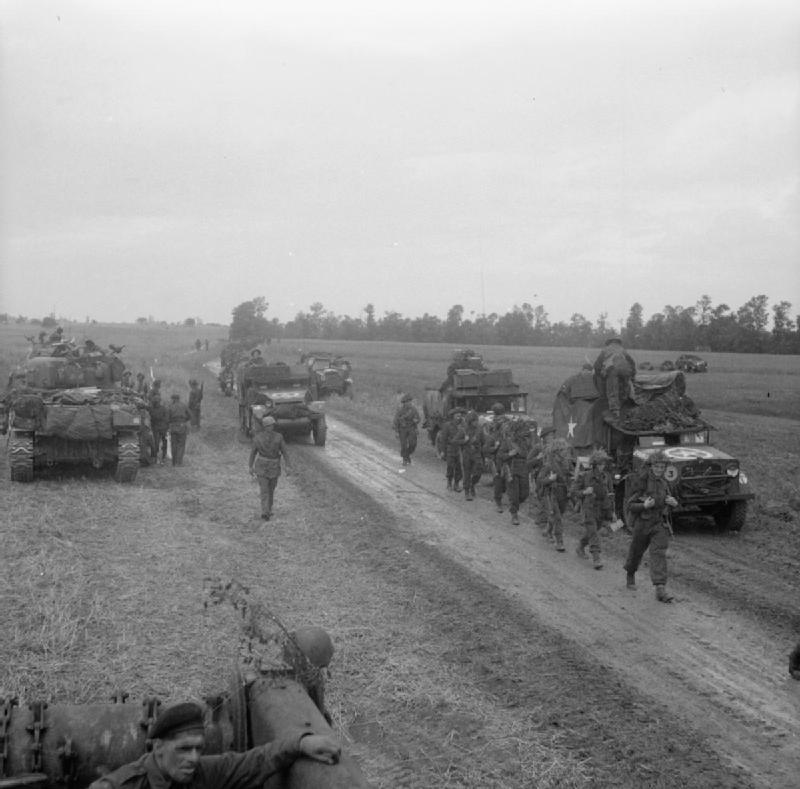
Men of the 10th Battalion, Highland Light Infantry advance past vehicles of 15th (Scottish) Division during Operation 'Epsom', 26 June 1944. On the left are two Sherman Crab flail tanks.

The 227th (Highland) Brigade landed in Normandy on 18 June 1944 with 10th Highland Light Infantry (10 HLI), 2nd Argyll & Sutherland Highlanders (2 A&SH) and 2nd Gordon Highlanders (2 Gordons). It was soon thrown into action in Operation Epsom on 26 June, when 15th (Scottish) Division was given the task of advancing five miles to capture the bridges over the Odon, thereby creating what became known as 'Scottish Corridor' to allow 11th Armoured Division to cross and push on to the Orne and the high ground south of Caen. 227 Brigade was in divisional reserve for this operation. The leading brigades lost heavily during close fighting, and the armour was held up. At 18.00, 15th (Scottish) was ordered to resume the advance, and 227th Brigade moved up. The Official History records that 'The brigade's leading battalions started ... in torrential rain. On the eastern road the advanced guard reached the outskirts of Colleville but the main body was held up near the Salbey stream, about a mile south of Cheux, and got no further that night; on the western road only the ground skirting Cheux was reached, when the infantry and supporting tanks were embroiled in confused fighting, there and round le Haut du Bosq. In the fading light and blinding downpour there was not enough time left to oust the enemy from their strong hold of the ridge'.

227th Brigade renewed the attack early the next morning. 10th HLI were held up by tanks of 12th SS Panzer Division Hitlerjugend, but 2nd Argylls made rapid progress against light opposition, taking the last two miles to the Tourmauville Bridge at a run and seizing a bridgehead for the Sherman tanks of 23rd Hussars from 11th Armoured to cross over. The following day (28 June) 2nd Argylls were ordered to move upstream towards the Odon bridges at Gavrus. Patrols found them undefended, and the battalions seized these as well. But while still isolated, they were counter-attacked by tanks and infantry of the newly arrived 10th SS Panzer Division Frundsberg. However, they held on to the bridges until reinforcements arrived.

=== Bluecoat ===
In the early part of July 1944, 15th (Scottish) took part in the fighting round Caen, then at the end of the month it moved west to the Caumont sector, where it was to join in VIII Corps's break-out southwards from the Normandy bridgehead (Operation Bluecoat). Its attack on 30 July was led by 227th Brigade advancing alongside 11th Armoured on the right and 43rd (Wessex) Division on the left. 227 Brigade was organised as a brigade group, with an additional infantry battalion, supported by 4th Tank Battalion, Grenadier Guards from 6th Guards Tank Brigade (Churchill tanks) and accompanied by flail tanks to deal with the mines sown thickly by both sides during the previous two months of stalemate. They began their advance a few minutes before 07.00. First the Highlanders had to clear two village strongpoints within a mile of Caumont and then capture les Logues and Point 226 (or Quarry Hill) a few miles further south. 'As soon as the leading troops showed themselves on the forward slopes of the Caumont ridge they ran into heavy defensive fire, and seven of the Churchills and two flail tanks were put out of action by mines'. However, the surviving flails made passages, the tanks caught up with the infantry and the first objectives were taken by 10.00. While the infantry carried on mopping-up, the tanks drove on to Point 226. 43rd (Wessex) had been held up, so 6th Guards Tank Brigade took Point 306 on the left as well, and then had to hold on until 18.00 when the first infantry caught up. Now they came under heavy shelling followed by an attack from Jagdpanthers of 654 schwere Panzerjäger-Abteilung (654th Heavy Anti-Tank Battalion), which drove over Point 226. However, with the arrival of more of 227th Brigade's infantry, the position on Point 226 was consolidated, the tanks remaining all night while the infantry continued mopping up. Over succeeding days VIII Corps advanced towards Mont Pincon, beginning the process of closing the Falaise 'Pocket'.

=== Crossing the Seine ===
In late August 1944, 15th (Scottish) was transferred to XII Corps and chosen to seize a bridgehead over the Seine for that corps. On 27 August 227th Brigade began crossing the 300-yard wide river at two points. At le Mesnil Andé, D Company of the 2nd Gordons in the lead suffered heavy casualties from machine gun fire directed against the vulnerable storm boats, and all those who got across were captured. 2nd Gordons' attack was halted, but at St Pierre du Vauvray, two miles downstream, 10th HLI had crossed without opposition, and the brigade was ferried over in DUKWs. Before midnight on 28 August the engineers had bridges open and XII Corps began to pass through the Scottish bridgehead.

=== Market Garden ===
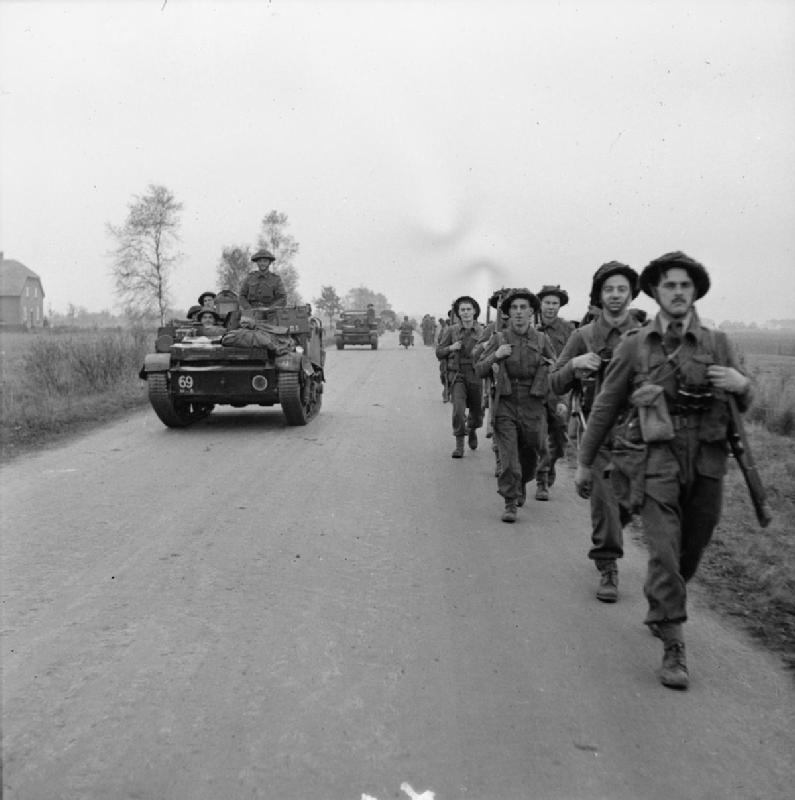
Universal Carriers and infantry of the 2nd Battalion, Argyll and Sutherland Highlanders move up for the attack on Tilburg, Netherlands, 27 October 1944.

During Operation Market Garden, XII Corps played a subsidiary role securing the left flank of XXX Corps' main thrust, but 15th (Scottish) had five days' hard fighting in securing the town of Best, just beyond the Wilhelmina Canal.

=== Veritable ===
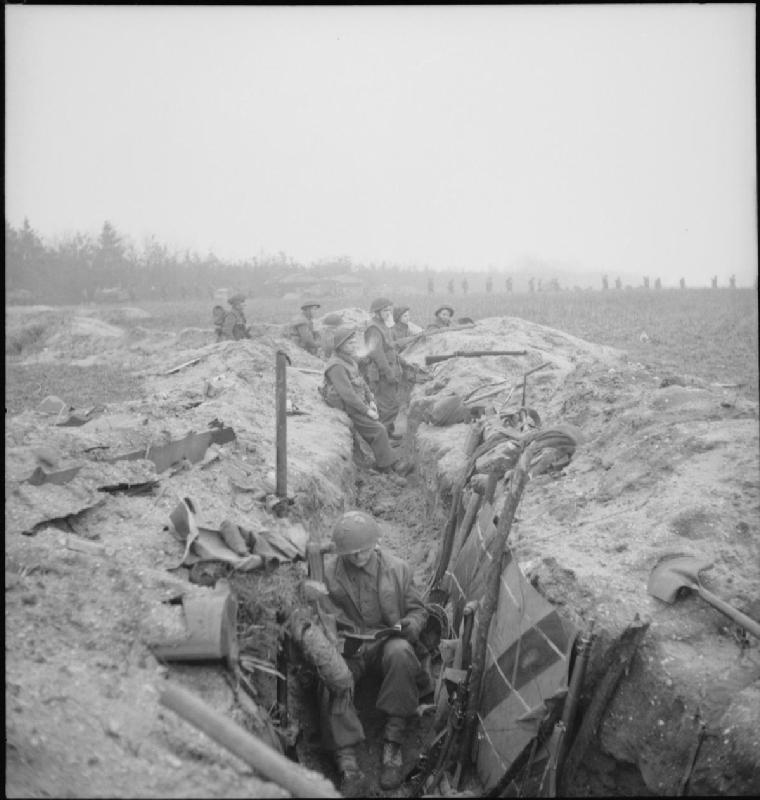
Men of the 2nd Battalion, Argyll and Sutherland Highlanders in captured German trenches, 8 February 1945.

In the opening of Operation VERITABLE (8 February 1945), 15th (Scottish), operating as part of Lieutenant-General Brian Horrocks' XXX Corps, had the task of breaching the northern extension of the Siegfried Line, consisting of anti-tank ditches, minefields, concrete emplacements and barbed-wire entanglements, and then seizing the key ground around Cleve. The division led with 46th (Highland) Brigade on the right and 227th (Highland) on the left. The opening phase went well, the troops having more difficulties with mud and mines than with the enemy. By dark, 227th Brigade had captured Kranenburg. But the follow-up attack by 44th (Lowland) Brigade, carried on tanks and in Kangaroo APCs, and preceded by flail and bridging tanks, was held up on the rough tracks. However, Horrocks heard that the Scots were entering Cleve, so he launched 43rd (Wessex) Division to pass through 15th (Scottish). He afterwards referred to this as "one of the worst mistakes I made in the war..." 15th (Scottish) had not got as far as reported, and the arrival of 43rd caused "one of the worst traffic jams of the whole war ... The language heard that night has seldom if ever been equalled."

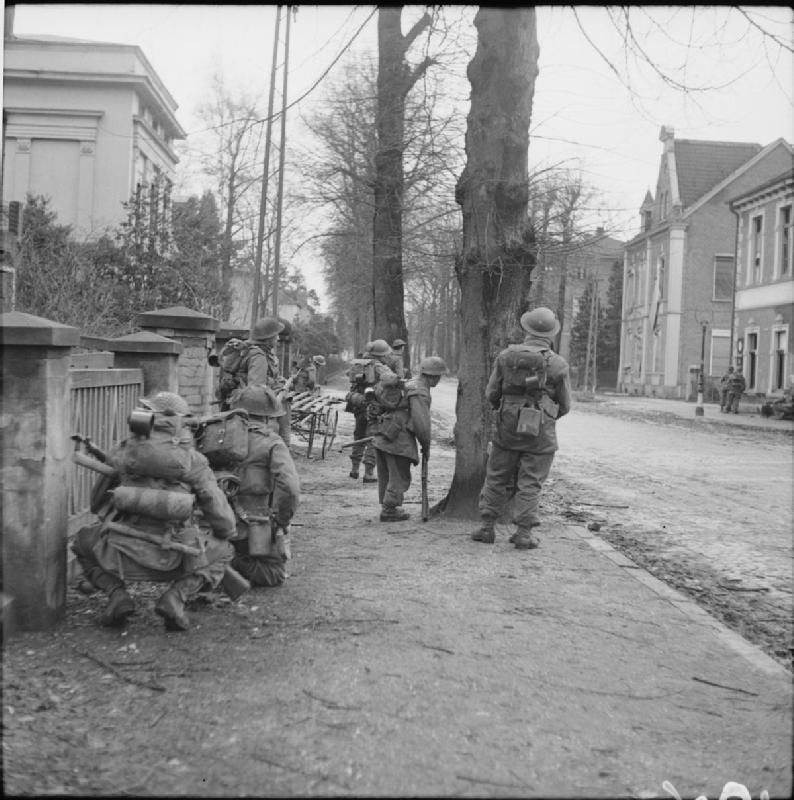
Infantrymen of the 2nd Battalion, Gordon Highlanders clearing snipers in Kleve, Germany, 11 February 1945.

The battle then turned into (in Horrocks's words) "a slogging match". 15th (Scottish) finally took Cleve on 11 February, and then had to face a counter-attack by XLVII Panzer Corps the following day. During the second phase of VERITABLE on 22 February, 15th (Scottish) again faced heavy opposition, from Panzer Lehr Division, as well as mines, mud, and an anti-tank ditch, but pushed the front to within two miles of Weeze and took many prisoners. They were then relieved by British 3rd Infantry Division.

=== Torchlight ===
15th (Scottish) Division had returned to XII Corps by the time of the Rhine crossing ('Operation Plunder'), and it was chosen for the Corps' main assault crossing opposite Xanten, codenamed 'Operation Torchlight'. 227 and 44 Brigades were extensively trained for this operation, with two practice crossings of the Maas ('Exercise Buffalo') on 14 and 15 March 1945 to rehearse with the Buffalo amphibious vehicles that would carry them. The attack went in at 02.00 on 24 March, five hours after 51st (Highland) Division began crossing a few miles downstream. Brigadier Edward Colville planned 227 Brigade's attack, codenamed 'Nap', to assault with 10 HLI on the right and 2 A&SH on the left, aiming to seize the villages of Overkamp and Lohr respectively. 2 Gordons would then cross and relieve the other two battalions.

Although 44th Brigade's assault went well against weak opposition, 227th Brigade's crossing did not go well. For one thing the Buffaloes (crewed by the East Riding Yeomanry) had difficulty climbing the far bank of the river, and secondly the opposition (from the German 7th Parachute Division) was tougher. The leading companies of 10 HLI crossed without casualties, but were landed several hundred yards to the right of their objective, leaving a gap between the assaulting battalions. They then found the dyke strongly held and suffered numerous casualties. The second 'flight' of Buffaloes also went astray, battalion HQ ended up in no-man's-land, and the Observation Post of 131st (Lowland – City of Glasgow) Field Regiment, Royal Artillery, was wiped out, delaying supporting fire. However, by dawn 10 HLI was secure in the outskirts of Overkamp.

2 A&SH had similar difficulties: the Buffaloes carrying D Company fund it impossible to land on the Eastern side of an inlet and had to land on the western side and march round it. They lost surprise and got into a tough fight with German paratroops. By first light they were joined by C company and together the companies cleared Hübsch, though with heavy casualties. Meanwhile, A and B companies had pushed north towards their objective ('Area X'). However, an attempt to capture Roperhof failed, and daylight revealed it to be a strongpoint occupied by paratroops.

At 06.15, A Company of 2 Gordons began to cross the river in stormboats, expecting to support 10 HLI, but drifting down to 2 A&SH's landing place, losing men to snipers along the riverbank. B Company, due to follow, suffered mortar fire at their launching place and abandoned the attempt. The rest of 2 Gordons crossed at 10.30 and joined 2 A&SH in clearing Lohr, which was complete by 13.30. During the morning the divisional reserve, 46th Brigade, began landing on 227's right with Buffaloes and Sherman DD amphibious tanks of 44th Royal Tank Regiment. Beginning at 17.15, 9th Cameronians and A Squadron of 44 RTR attacked Haffen from the SE, while 2 Gordons attacked from the West. By 23.00 15th (Scottish) was in a firm position on the East bank of the Rhine, though the holdups to 227th Brigade meant that not all the objectives had been reached. The division had also made contact with the US 17th Airborne Division, which had dropped beyond the river that morning as part of Operation Varsity.

Over following days, 15th (Scottish) continued to advance northwards against stubborn resistance and repeated counter-attacks until on 26 March it made contact with XXX Corps and secured a bridgehead over the River Issel, which it expanded next day. The division had suffered 824 casualties over the four days of the battle.

=== Drive to the Elbe ===
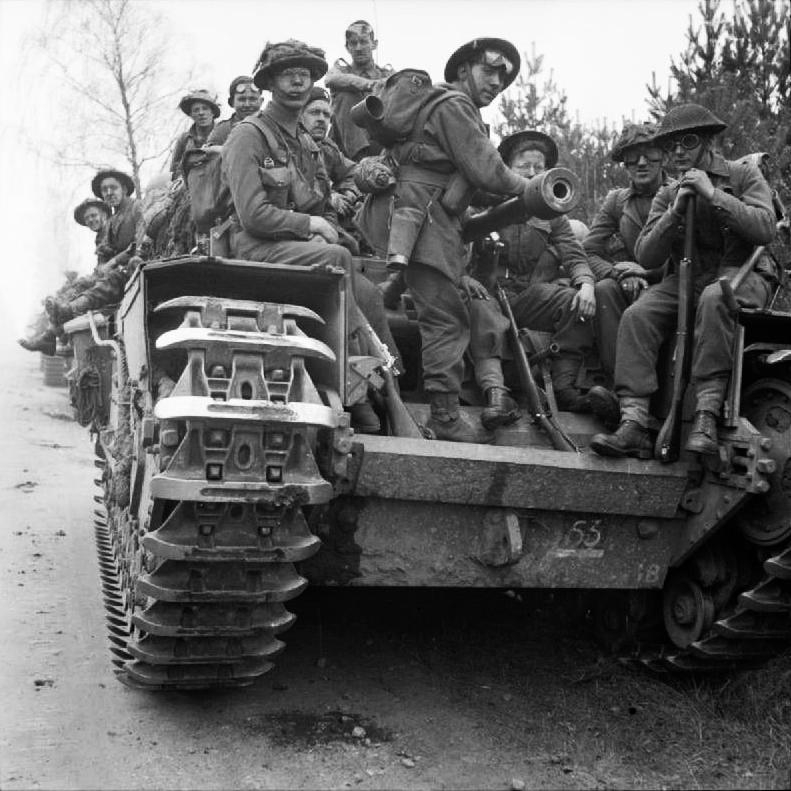
Churchill tanks of the 2nd (Armoured) Battalion, Scots Guards, 6th Guards Tank Brigade, carrying men of the 10th Battalion, Highland Light Infantry, 227th Brigade, during the advance to the River Elbe, 13 April 1945.

15th (Scottish) joined VIII Corps for the final drive on to the River Elbe. On 11 April 1945 the division led the corps advance on the Celle–Uelzen axis, with 11th Armoured Division using minor roads on its left. The division reached Celle against patchy opposition on 12 April, where it had to bridge the Aller. Switching to minor roads to avoid demolitions on the main road, the Scots made rapid progress during the night of 13–14 April, and by dawn were almost into Uelzen. There they ran into an advancing German force from Panzer Division Clausewitz and 233rd Reserve Panzer Division. There was bitter fighting that day and night, but on 15 April the Scots closed in on the town, while 11th Armoured and 6th Airborne Divisions bypassed it to north and south respectively to hem in the garrison. Although a group of Clausewitz Division got away during the night of 17 April, the town was captured the following day.

On 29 April, 15th (Scottish) made one last assault crossing with Buffaloes, stormboats and Sherman DD tanks, to get over the Elbe. With overwhelming artillery and tactical air support, opposition was limited. Three days later negotiations began for the surrender of all German forces in North Germany.
