= Duncan Campbell (British Army officer, died 1837) =

British Army officer and politician

General Duncan Campbell
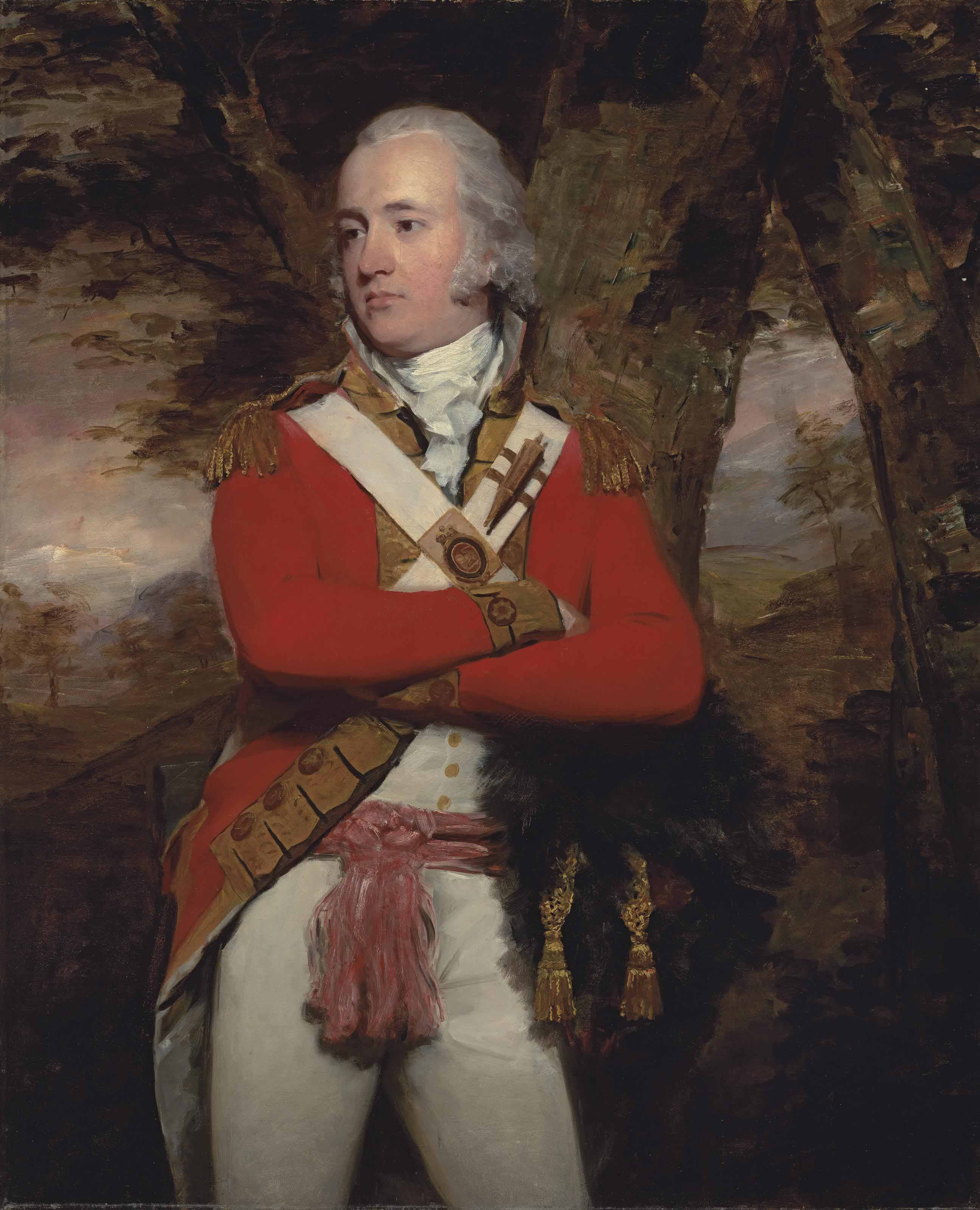
- Portrait by Sir Henry Raeburn
- Born: 29 June 1763
- Died: 9 April 1837 (aged 73)
- Burial place: Greyfriars Churchyard, Edinburgh
- Military career
- Allegiance: Great Britain; United Kingdom
- Branch: British Army
- Service years: –1837
- Rank: General

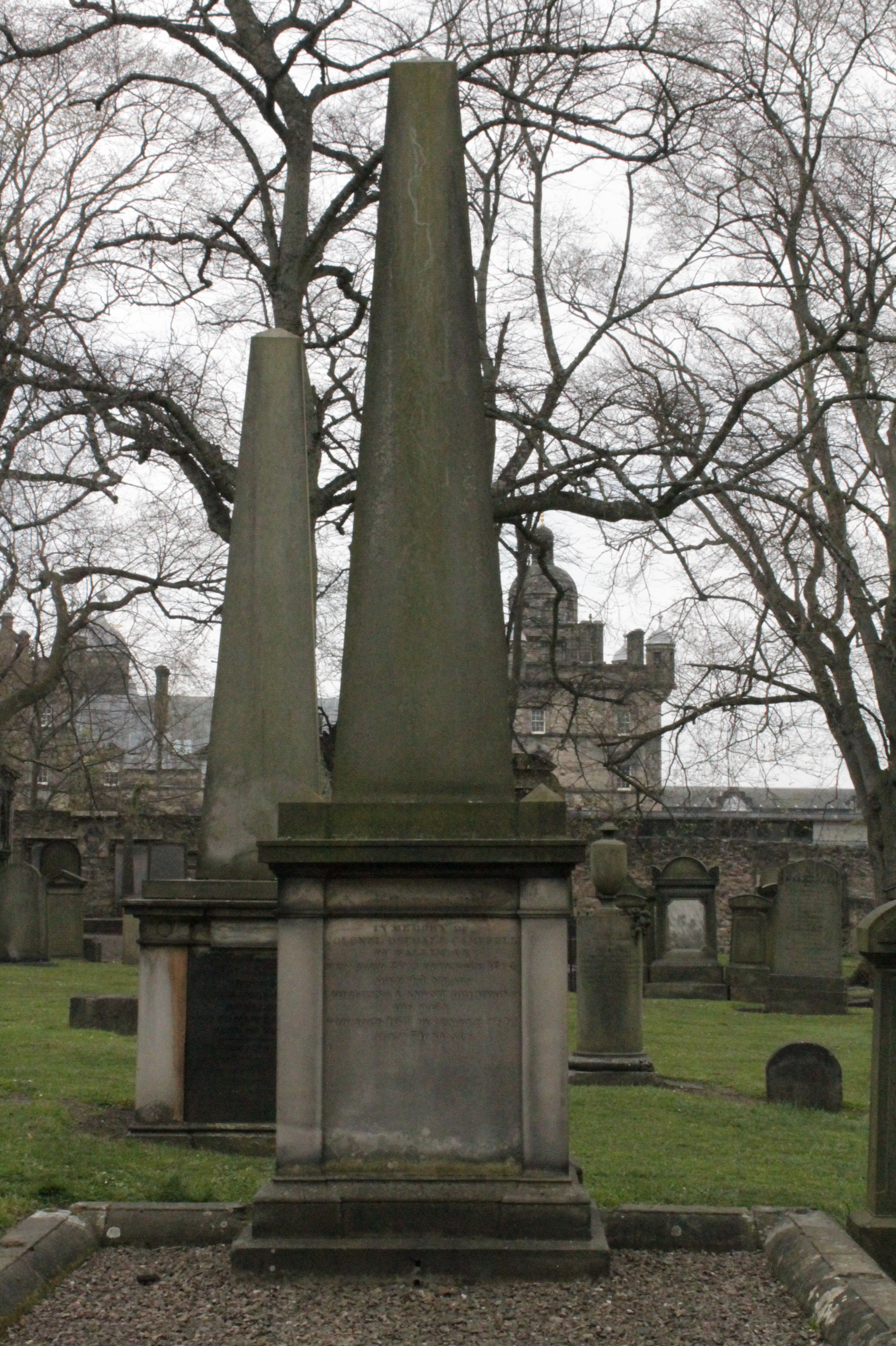
The grave of General Duncan Campbell of Lochnell, Greyfriars Kirkyard

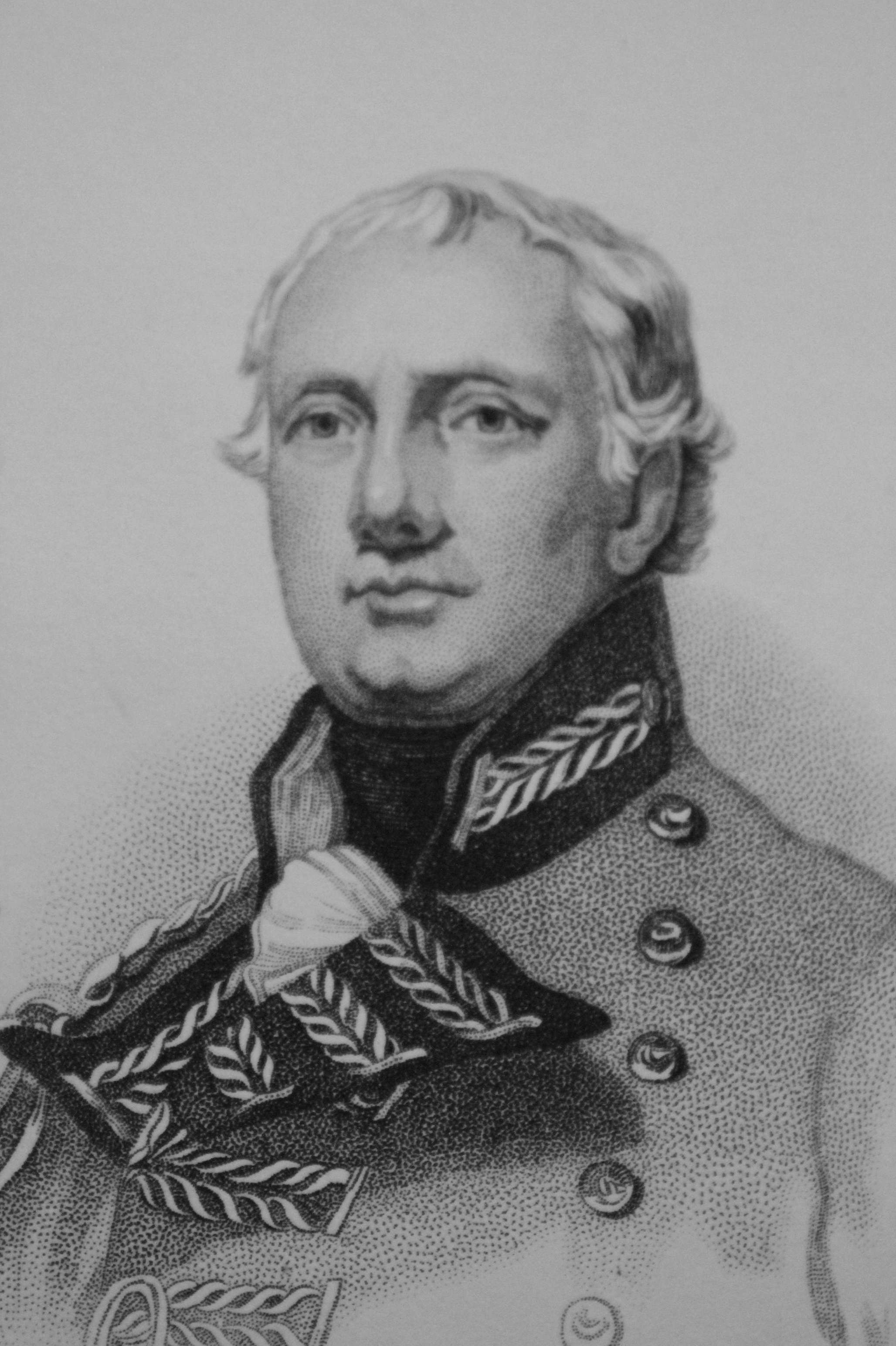
Duncan Campbell of Lochnell (1763-1837)

General Duncan Campbell of Lochnell (29 June 1763 – 9 April 1837) was a British Army officer and Whig politician. An officer in the 91st Regiment of Foot, he sat in the House of Commons for nine years in the interest of George Campbell, 6th Duke of Argyll.

== Life ==
Campbell was the youngest son of Colonel Dougald Campbell of Ballimore (1720-1764). His mother Christian Lamont Drummond (1734-1810) was the daughter of George Drummond, several times Lord Provost of Edinburgh. Her brother (Duncan Campbell's uncle) was Alexander Drummond, consul at Aleppo, and the widow of David Campbell of Dunloskin.

He was educated at Glasgow University.

Campbell was a captain in the 1st Foot (Royal Scots) in 1780, colonel commandant of the 98th Foot in 1794, and full colonel in 1796. He was subsequently promoted major-general in 1802, lieutenant general in 1808, and full general in 1819.

He served as Regimental Colonel of the 91st (Argyllshire Highlanders) Regiment of Foot from 1796 to his death in 1837.

He retired to Edinburgh living at 135 George Street in the New Town.

He died in Edinburgh on 9 April 1837. He is buried with his parents in Greyfriars Kirkyard. The grave is marked by a large monument and stands in the centre of the section south of the church.

== Family ==
He married twice.

In 1792 he married the Hon Eleanor Fraser, daughter of George Fraser, 14th Baron Saltoun, and widow of Sir George Ramsay, 6th Baronet of Banff. They divorced in 1808. He then married Augusta Murray, daughter of Sir William Murray, 5th Baronet of Ochtertyre and sister of George Murray, a fellow army officer.

He had no children by either marriage.

== Politics ==
Campbell was elected unopposed as the Member of Parliament (MP) for Ayr Burghs at a by-election in 1809. At this time, elections in the Ayr Burghs were determined by an alliance between Duke of Argyll and his ally the Earl of Bute, who between them controlled three of the five Burghs; the other two burghs, being outnumbered, acquiesced in the choices of Argyll and Bute.

The 1809 vacancy had been caused by the death aged 39 of the previous MP John Campbell of Shawfield and Islay, and Whig leaders had taken the opportunity to press Argyll to support a candidate of their choice. The Earl of Lauderdale proposed Sir William Cunynghame, 4th Baronet, but Argyll preferred a clansman, even though Duncan Campbell was not a close relative.

Campbell voted reliably as a Whig, but reportedly did not enjoy the Commons. Nonetheless, when Argyll was persuaded at the 1818 general election to support Bute's candidate Thomas Francis Kennedy, Campbell stood aside in the Ayr Burghs, but did not retire voluntarily. Instead he contested Berwick upon Tweed, where he was defeated by a margin of more than 2:1.

Parliament of the United Kingdom
Preceded by John Campbell of Shawfield and Islay	Member of Parliament for Ayr Burghs; 1809 – 1818	Succeeded by Thomas Francis Kennedy
