= Ayr Burghs =

Parliamentary constituency in the United Kingdom, 1801–1950

- Former district of Burghs constituency for the House of Commons
- Subdivisions of Scotland: Ayrshire, Argyllshire

1708–1950
- Seats: 1
- Created from: Ayr, Campbeltown, Inveraray, Irvine, Rothesay
- Replaced by: Ayr, Central Ayrshire, Bute and Northern Ayrshire

Ayr Burghs was a district of burghs constituency of the House of Commons of the Parliament of Great Britain from 1708 to 1800 and of the House of Commons of the Parliament of the United Kingdom from 1801 to 1950. It elected one Member of Parliament (MP), using the first-past-the-post voting system.

== Creation ==
The British parliamentary constituency was created in 1708 following the Acts of Union 1707 and replaced the former Parliament of Scotland burgh constituencies of Ayr, Campbeltown, Inveraray, Irvine and Rothesay.

== Boundaries ==
The list of parliamentary burghs represented by the constituency changed in 1832 and again in 1918:

- 1708 to 1832: the Ayrshire burghs of Ayr and Irvine, the Argyllshire burghs of Campbeltown and Inveraray and the Buteshire burgh of Rothesay
- 1832 to 1918: the Ayrshire burghs of Ayr and Irvine and the Argyllshire burghs of Campbeltown, Inveraray and Oban
- 1918 to 1950: the Ayrshire burghs of Ardrossan, Ayr, Irvine, Prestwick, Saltcoats and Troon

When the Ayr Burghs constituency was abolished in 1950, the Ayr and Prestwick burghs were merged into the county constituency of Ayr. Ardrossan and Saltcoats were merged into Bute and Northern Ayrshire and Irvine and Troon were merged into Central Ayrshire.

== Members of Parliament ==
Election	Member	Party
1708	Hon. James Campbell	
1710	Charles Oliphant	
1720 by-election	Thomas Kennedy	Tory
1721 by-election	Duncan Forbes	Whig
1722	William Steuart	
1734	James Stuart	
1741	The Earl of Granard	
1747	Charles Erskine	
1749 by-election	Sir Henry Erskine	
1754	James Stuart-Mackenzie	
1761	Lord Frederick Campbell	
1761 by-election	Alexander Wedderburn	
1768	James Stuart	
1774	Sir George Macartney	
1776 by-election	Frederick Stuart	
1780	Archibald Edmonstone	Tory
1790	Charles Stuart	
1794 by-election	John Campbell of Liston Hall	
1807	John Campbell of Shawfield and Islay	
1809 by-election	Duncan Campbell	Whig
1818	Thomas Francis Kennedy	Whig
1834 by-election	Lord Patrick Crichton-Stuart	Whig
1852	Edward Craufurd	Radical
1859	Edward Craufurd	Liberal
1874	Sir William Montgomery-Cuninghame	Conservative
1880	Richard Campbell	Liberal
1886	Richard Campbell	Liberal Unionist
1888 by-election	John Sinclair	Liberal
1890 by-election	James Somervell	Conservative
1892	William Birkmyre	Liberal
1895	Charles Lindsay Orr-Ewing	Conservative
1904 by-election	Joseph Dobbie	Liberal
1906	Sir George Younger	Conservative
1922	Sir John Baird	Conservative
1925	Thomas Moore	Conservative
1950	constituency abolished	

Sir Thomas was elected, in 1950, as the first MP for the then new constituency of Ayr

== Elections ==
Decades:	1840s; 1850s; 1860s; 1870s; 1880s; 1890s; 1900s; 1910s; 1920s; 1930s; 1940s

=== Elections in the 1830s ===
General election 1830: Ayr Burghs
Party	Candidate	Votes	%
Whig	Thomas Francis Kennedy	Unopposed	
Whig hold			

General election 1831: Ayr Burghs
Party	Candidate	Votes	%
Whig	Thomas Francis Kennedy	Unopposed	
Whig hold			

Kennedy was appointed as a Lord Commissioner of the Treasury, requiring a by-election.

By-election, 5 March 1832: Ayr Burghs
Party	Candidate	Votes	%
Whig	Thomas Francis Kennedy	Unopposed	
Whig hold			

General election 1832: Ayr Burghs
Party	Candidate	Votes	%
Whig	Thomas Francis Kennedy	375	65.6
Radical	John Taylor	164	28.7
Tory	James Cruickshanks	33	5.8
Majority		211	36.9
Turnout		572	90.6
Registered electors		631	
Whig hold			

Kennedy resigned, causing a by-election.

By-election, 3 March 1834: Ayr Burghs
Party	Candidate	Votes	%	±%
Whig	Patrick Crichton-Stuart	305	58.9	−6.7
Radical	John Taylor	213	41.1	+12.4
Majority		92	17.8	−19.1
Turnout		518	73.9	−16.7
Registered electors		701		
Whig hold		Swing	−9.6	

General election 1835: Ayr Burghs
Party	Candidate	Votes	%	±%
Whig	Patrick Crichton-Stuart	339	51.2	−14.4
Radical	Alexander Johnstone	323	48.8	+20.1
Majority		16	2.4	−34.5
Turnout		662	78.1	−12.5
Registered electors		848		
Whig hold		Swing	−17.3	

General election 1837: Ayr Burghs
Party	Candidate	Votes	%	±%
Whig	Patrick Crichton-Stuart	368	50.9	−0.3
Radical	Alexander Johnstone	355	49.1	+0.3
Majority		13	1.8	−0.6
Turnout		723	70.2	−7.9
Registered electors		1,030		
Whig hold		Swing	−0.3	

=== Elections in the 1840s ===
General election 1841: Ayr Burghs
Party	Candidate	Votes	%	±%
Whig	Patrick Crichton-Stuart	Unopposed		
Registered electors		1,097		
Whig hold				

General election 1847: Ayr Burghs
Party	Candidate	Votes	%	±%
Whig	Patrick Crichton-Stuart	Unopposed		
Registered electors		1,051		
Whig hold				

=== Elections in the 1850s ===
General election 1852: Ayr Burghs
Party	Candidate	Votes	%	±%
Radical	Edward Craufurd	338	50.7	N/A
Conservative	Archibald Thomas Boyle	329	49.3	New
Majority		9	1.4	N/A
Turnout		667	64.2	N/A
Registered electors		1,039		
Radical gain from Whig		Swing	N/A	

General election 1857: Ayr Burghs
Party	Candidate	Votes	%	±%
Radical	Edward Craufurd	Unopposed		
Registered electors		1,136		
Radical hold				

General election 1859: Ayr Burghs
Party	Candidate	Votes	%	±%
Liberal	Edward Craufurd	Unopposed		
Registered electors		1,203		
Liberal hold				

Back to Elections

=== Elections in the 1860s ===
General election 1865: Ayr Burghs
Party	Candidate	Votes	%	±%
Liberal	Edward Craufurd	567	53.1	N/A
Liberal	Alexander Haldane Oswald	501	46.9	N/A
Majority		66	6.2	N/A
Turnout		1,068	79.7	N/A
Registered electors		1,340		
Liberal hold		Swing	N/A	

General election 1868: Ayr Burghs
Party	Candidate	Votes	%	±%
Liberal	Edward Craufurd	1,116	52.1	−1.0
Liberal	James Anderson	1,025	47.9	+1.0
Majority		91	4.2	−2.0
Turnout		2,141	83.5	+3.8
Registered electors		2,565		
Liberal hold		Swing	−1.0	

Back to Elections

=== Elections in the 1870s ===
General election 1874: Ayr Burghs
Party	Candidate	Votes	%	±%
Conservative	William Montgomery-Cuninghame	1,697	50.2	New
Liberal	Edward Craufurd	1,683	49.8	−2.3
Majority		14	0.4	N/A
Turnout		3,380	82.6	−0.9
Registered electors		4,092		
Conservative gain from Liberal		Swing	N/A	

Back to Elections

=== Elections in the 1880s ===
General election 1880: Ayr Burghs
Party	Candidate	Votes	%	±%
Liberal	Richard Campbell	2,303	61.9	+12.1
Conservative	William Montgomery-Cuninghame	1,420	38.1	−12.1
Majority		883	23.8	N/A
Turnout		3,723	86.6	+4.0
Registered electors		4,297		
Liberal gain from Conservative		Swing	+12.1	

General election 1885: Ayr Burghs
Party	Candidate	Votes	%	±%
Liberal	Richard Campbell	2,460	53.7	−8.2
Conservative	Malcolm Low	2,118	46.3	+8.2
Majority		342	7.4	−16.4
Turnout		4,578	84.0	−2.6
Registered electors		5,449		
Liberal hold		Swing	−8.2	

General election 1886: Ayr Burghs
Party	Candidate	Votes	%	±%
Liberal Unionist	Richard Campbell	2,673	64.1	+17.8
Liberal	John Sinclair	1,498	35.9	−17.8
Majority		1,175	28.2	N/A
Turnout		4,171	76.5	−7.5
Registered electors		5,449		
Liberal Unionist gain from Liberal		Swing	+17.8	

Campbell's death caused a by-election.

By-election, 15 Jun 1888: Ayr Burghs
Party	Candidate	Votes	%	±%
Liberal	John Sinclair	2,321	50.6	+14.7
Liberal Unionist	Evelyn Ashley	2,268	49.4	−14.7
Majority		53	1.2	N/A
Turnout		4,589	84.1	+7.6
Registered electors		5,458		
Liberal gain from Liberal Unionist		Swing	+14.7	

Back to Elections

=== Elections in the 1890s ===
By-election, 1890: Ayr Burghs
Party	Candidate	Votes	%	±%
Conservative	James Somervell	2,610	51.3	−12.8
Liberal	E. Routledge	2,480	48.7	+12.8
Majority		130	2.6	−25.6
Turnout		5,090	87.8	+11.3
Registered electors		5,798		
Conservative hold		Swing	−12.8	

General election 1892: Ayr Burghs
Party	Candidate	Votes	%	±%
Liberal	William Birkmyre	2,760	50.1	+14.2
Conservative	James Somervell	2,753	49.9	−14.2
Majority		7	0.2	N/A
Turnout		5,513	88.3	+11.8
Registered electors		6,245		
Liberal gain from Liberal Unionist		Swing	+14.2	

General election 1895: Ayr Burghs
Party	Candidate	Votes	%	±%
Conservative	Charles Orr-Ewing	3,057	52.9	+3.0
Liberal	William Birkmyre	2,722	47.1	−3.0
Majority		335	5.8	N/A
Turnout		5,779	88.9	+0.6
Registered electors		6,498		
Conservative gain from Liberal		Swing	+3.0	

Back to Elections

=== Elections in the 1900s ===
General election 1900: Ayr Burghs
Party	Candidate	Votes	%	±%
Conservative	Charles Orr-Ewing	3,101	55.3	+2.4
Liberal	Edmond Charles Browne	2,511	44.7	−2.4
Majority		590	10.6	+4.8
Turnout		5,612	82.3	−6.6
Registered electors		6,819		
Conservative hold		Swing	+2.4	

Dobbie

1904 Ayr Burghs by-election
Party	Candidate	Votes	%	±%
Liberal	Joseph Dobbie	3,221	50.3	+5.6
Conservative	George Younger	3,177	49.7	−5.6
Majority		44	0.6	N/A
Turnout		6,398	88.4	+6.1
Registered electors		7,240		
Liberal gain from Conservative		Swing	+5.6	

Younger

General election 1906: Ayr Burghs
Party	Candidate	Votes	%	±%
Conservative	George Younger	3,766	51.8	−3.5
Liberal	Joseph Dobbie	3,505	48.2	+3.5
Majority		261	3.6	−7.0
Turnout		7,271	90.5	+8.2
Registered electors		8,031		
Conservative hold		Swing	−3.5	

Back to Elections

=== Elections in the 1910s ===
General election January 1910: Ayr Burghs
Party	Candidate	Votes	%	±%
Conservative	George Younger	3,647	50.4	−1.4
Liberal	William Robertson	3,594	49.6	+1.4
Majority		53	0.8	−2.8
Turnout		7,241	89.8	−0.7
Registered electors		8,067		
Conservative hold		Swing	−1.4	

General election December 1910: Ayr Burghs
Party	Candidate	Votes	%	±%
Conservative	George Younger	3,852	51.6	+1.2
Liberal	William Robertson	3,620	48.4	−1.2
Majority		232	3.2	+2.4
Turnout		7,472	90.7	+0.9
Registered electors		8,236		
Conservative hold		Swing	+1.2	

General election 1918: Ayr Burghs
Party		Candidate	Votes	%	±%
C	Unionist	George Younger	9,565	49.1	−2.5
	Liberal	Murdoch McKenzie Wood	5,410	27.7	−20.7
	Labour	Campbell Stephen	4,534	23.2	New
Majority			4,155	21.4	+18.2
Turnout			19,509	62.2	−28.5
	Unionist hold		Swing	+9.0	
C indicates candidate endorsed by the coalition government.

Back to Elections

=== Elections in the 1920s ===
General election 1922: Ayr Burghs
Party	Candidate	Votes	%	±%
Unionist	John Baird	11,179	44.5	−4.6
Liberal	Peter Raffan	7,402	29.5	+1.8
Labour	John McDiarmid Airlie	6,533	26.0	+2.8
Majority		3,777	15.0	−6.4
Turnout		25,114	71.1	+8.9
Unionist hold		Swing	−3.2	

General election 1923: Ayr Burghs
Party	Candidate	Votes	%	±%
Unionist	John Baird	10,206	41.8	−2.7
Labour	John McDiarmid Airlie	7,732	31.7	+5.7
Liberal	William Pringle	6,467	26.5	−3.0
Majority		2,474	10.1	−4.9
Turnout		24,405	70.0	−1.1
Unionist hold		Swing	−4.2	

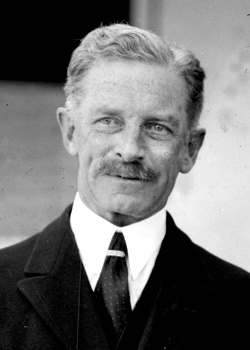
Sir John Baird

General election 1924: Ayr Burghs
Party	Candidate	Votes	%	±%
Unionist	John Baird	16,153	62.3	+20.5
Labour	John McDiarmid Airlie	9,787	37.7	+6.0
Majority		6,366	24.6	+14.5
Turnout		25,940	73.5	+3.5
Unionist hold		Swing		

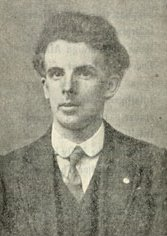
Patrick Dollan

William Pringle

1925 Ayr Burghs by-election
Party	Candidate	Votes	%	±%
Unionist	Thomas Moore	11,601	46.2	−16.1
Labour	Patrick Dollan	8,813	35.2	−2.5
Liberal	William Pringle	4,656	18.6	New
Majority		2,788	11.0	−13.6
Turnout		25,070	71.0	−2.5
Unionist hold		Swing		

General election 1929: Ayr Burghs
Party	Candidate	Votes	%	±%
Unionist	Thomas Moore	16,874	45.9	−16.3
Labour	Clarice Shaw	13,429	36.5	−1.2
Liberal	Robert Lorimer	6,479	17.6	N/A
Majority		3,445	9.4	−15.2
Turnout		36,782	74.8	+1.3
Unionist hold		Swing		

Back to Elections

=== Elections in the 1930s ===
General election 1931: Ayr Burghs
Party	Candidate	Votes	%	±%
Unionist	Thomas Moore	28,256	73.9	+28.0
Labour	Clarice Shaw	9,974	26.1	−10.4
Majority		18,282	47.8	+38.4
Turnout		38,230	76.9	+2.1
Unionist hold		Swing		

General election 1935: Ayr Burghs
Party	Candidate	Votes	%	±%
Unionist	Thomas Moore	25,893	66.1	−7.8
Labour	Arthur Brady	13,274	33.9	+7.8
Majority		12,619	32.2	−15.6
Turnout		39,167	73.0	−3.9
Unionist hold		Swing		

Back to Elections

=== Elections in the 1940s ===
General election 1945: Ayr Burghs
Party	Candidate	Votes	%	±%
Unionist	Thomas Moore	22,593	50.8	−15.3
Labour	William Ross	21,865	49.2	+15.3
Majority		728	1.6	−30.6
Turnout		44,458	71.5	−1.5
Unionist hold		Swing		

Back to Top

== See also ==
- List of former Parliamentary constituencies in the United Kingdom
