= Thomas Francis Kennedy (politician) =

British politician (1788–1879)

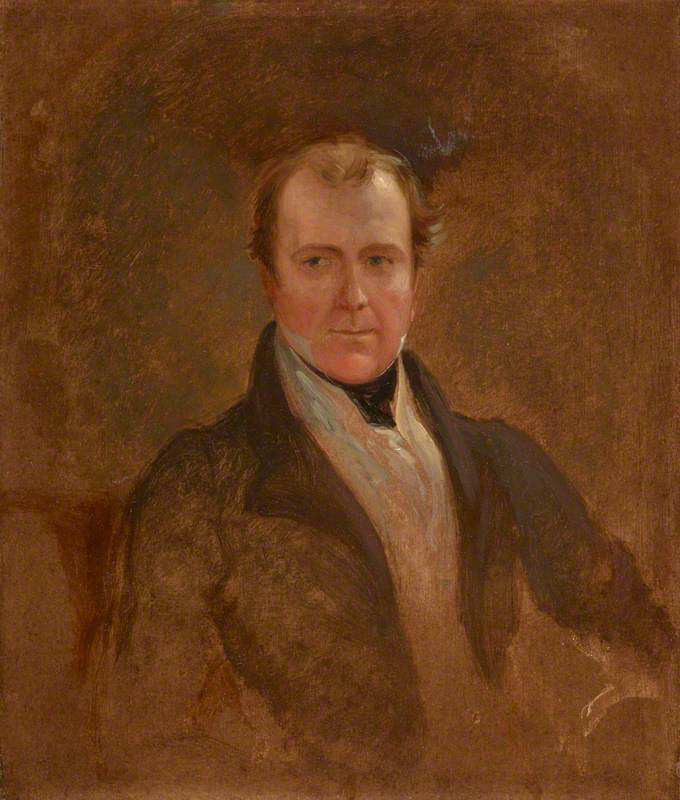
Portrait by George Hayter, 1838

Thomas Francis Kennedy (11 November 1788 – 1 April 1879) was a Scottish politician, born near Ayr in 1788. He studied for the bar and became advocate in 1811. Having been elected Member of Parliament for the Ayr Burghs in 1818, he devoted the greater part of his life to the promotion of liberal reforms.

In 1820 he married the only daughter of Sir Samuel Romilly. He was greatly assisted by Lord Cockburn, then Mr. Henry Cockburn, and a volume of correspondence published by Kennedy in 1874 forms a curious and interesting record of the consultations of the two friends on measures which they regarded as requisite for the political regeneration of their native country. One of the first measures to which he directed his attention was the withdrawal of the power of nominating juries from the judges, and the imparting of a right of peremptory challenge to prisoners. Among other subjects were the improvement of the parish schools, of pauper administration, and of several of the corrupt forms of legal procedure which then prevailed.

Kennedy took a prominent part in the construction of the Scottish Reform Act 1832; indeed he and Lord Cockburn may almost be regarded as its authors. After the accession of the Whigs to office in 1832 he held office in the ministry as Clerk of the Ordnance in 1832 and as a Junior Lord of the Treasury from 1832 to 1834, and most of the measures of reform for Scotland, such as burgh reform, the improvements in the law of entail, and the reform of the sheriff courts, owed much to his sagacity and energy. In 1837 he went to Ireland as pay master of civil services, and set himself to the promotion of various measures of reform. Kennedy retired from office in 1854, but continued to take keen interest in political affairs and up to his death in 1879 took a great part in both county and parish business. He had a stern love of justice, and a determined hatred of everything savouring of corruption or dishonesty.

Parliament of the United Kingdom
Preceded by Duncan Campbell	Member of Parliament for Ayr Burghs; 1818–1834	Succeeded by Lord Patrick Crichton-Stuart
Military offices
Preceded by Charles Tennyson	Clerk of the Ordnance; 1832	Succeeded by William Leader Maberly
