= Charles Lindsay Orr-Ewing =

British politician

Member of Parliament for Ayr Burghs
- In office 13 July 1895 – 24 December 1903
- Monarch: Victoria
- Preceded by: William Birkmyre
- Succeeded by: Joseph Dobbie

Personal details
- Born: Bonhill, Dunbartonshire, Scotland; 8 September 1860
- Died: 24 December 1903 (aged 42–43) Wigtown, Wigtownshire, Scotland
- Party: Conservative
- Relations: Sir Archibald Orr-Ewing (father)

Military service
- Allegiance: United Kingdom
- Branch/service: British Army
- Rank: Captain
- Unit: Argyll and Sutherland Highlanders

Charles Lindsay Orr-Ewing (8 September 1860 – 24 December 1903) was a Scottish Tory politician.

The youngest son of Sir Archibald Orr-Ewing and Elizabeth Lindsay Reid; he was educated at Harrow School. After travel in the East, he was commissioned as a captain in the 3rd Argyll and Sutherland Highlanders. He was Member of Parliament for Ayr Burghs from 1895, until he died of heart failure in 1903 aged 43.

Orr-Ewing married first in 1888 Hon. Beatrice Mary Leslie Hore-Ruthven (born 4 June 1871, died 24 March 1930), daughter of Walter Hore-Ruthven, 9th Lord Ruthven of Freeland. They were divorced in 1894, and she later re-married Major Charles Malcolm. There were two children:

- Janet Beatrix Orr-Ewing (1890–1943), who married in 1909 Captain George Culme-Seymour.
- Sir Ian Leslie Orr-Ewing (1893–1958).

He married secondly on 28 April 1898 Lady Augusta Helen Elizabeth Boyle (born 25 August 1876, died 12 May 1967), daughter of David Boyle, 7th Earl of Glasgow. After her husband′s death, Lady Augusta re-married in 1914 Thomas Walker Hobart Inskip, a Conservative politician who was in 1939 created Viscount Caldecote. They had three children:

- Lieutenant Edward Lindsay Orr-Ewing, MC (1899–1930).
- Captain David Orr-Ewing, DSO (1900–1964), Royal Navy officer.
- Barbara Dorothea Orr-Ewing (1902–1993), who married in 1931 Lieut.-Commander William Edmund Halsey, and left children.

Parliament of the United Kingdom
Preceded by William Birkmyre	Member of Parliament for Ayr Burghs; 1895–1904	Succeeded by Joseph Dobbie
