= 91st (Argyllshire Highlanders) Regiment of Foot =

91st Regiment of Foot
- Active: 1794–1881
- Country: Kingdom of Great Britain (1794–1800); United Kingdom (1801–1881)
- Branch: British Army
- Type: Line Infantry
- Size: One battalion (two battalions 1804–1815)
- Motto: Ne Obliviscaris (Do not forget)
- Colours: Yellow facings
- Engagements: French Revolutionary Wars; Napoleonic Wars

The 91st (Argyllshire Highlanders) Regiment of Foot was a Line Regiment of the British Army, raised in 1794. Under the Childers Reforms it amalgamated with the 93rd (Sutherland Highlanders) Regiment of Foot to form the Argyll and Sutherland Highlanders in 1881.

== History ==
=== Formation ===
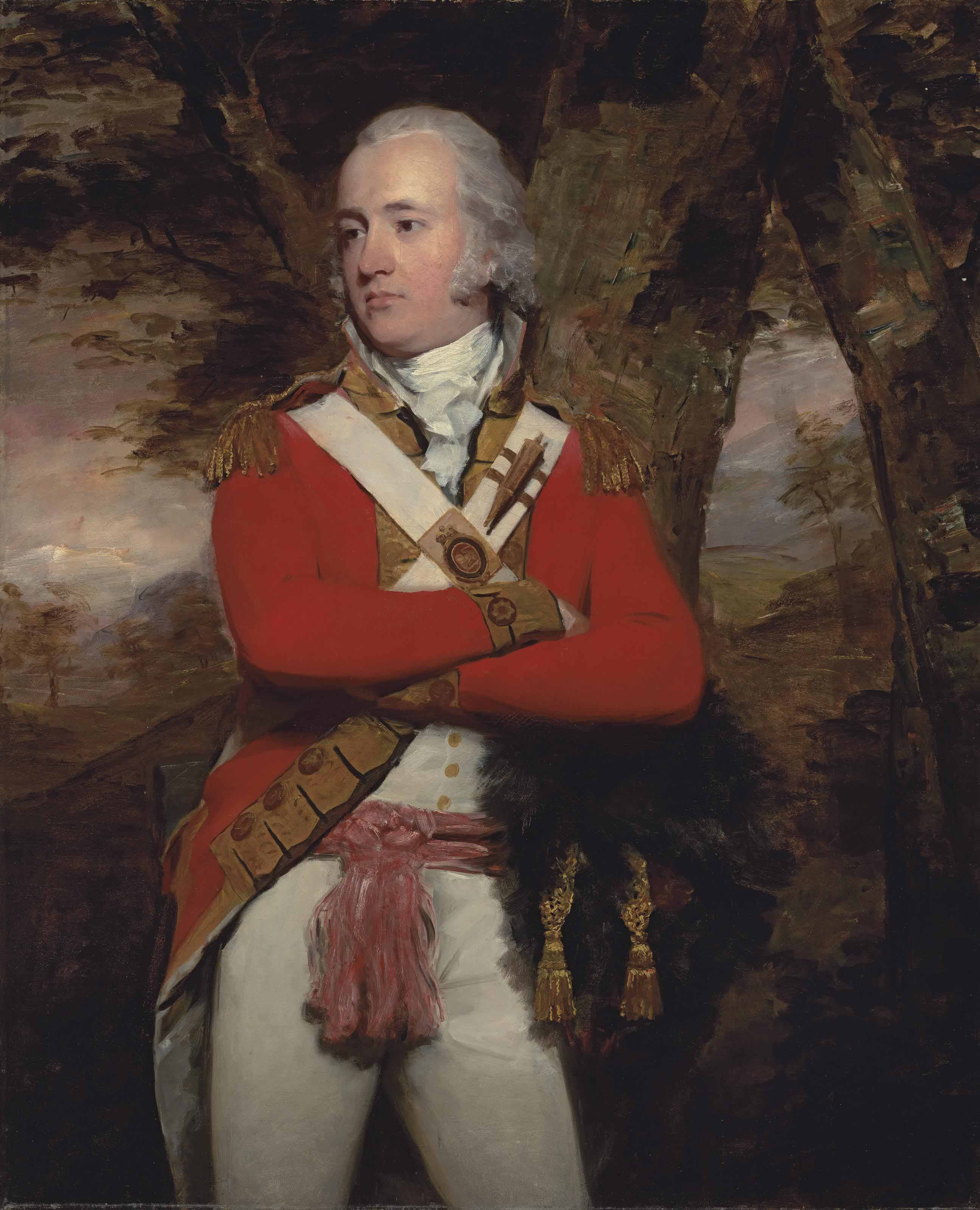
Duncan Campbell, the regiment's founder

The regiment was raised in Argyll by General Duncan Campbell of Lochnell for John Campbell, 5th Duke of Argyll as the 98th (Argyllshire Highlanders) Regiment of Foot, in response to the threat posed by the French Revolution, on 10 February 1794. The regiment was sent to the Dutch Cape Colony as part in the British invasion of the Cape Colony in June 1795 and witnessed the surrender of the colony in September 1795. The regiment was re-ranked as the 91st (Argyllshire Highlanders) Regiment of Foot in May 1796 before embarking for England in January 1803.

=== Napoleonic Wars ===
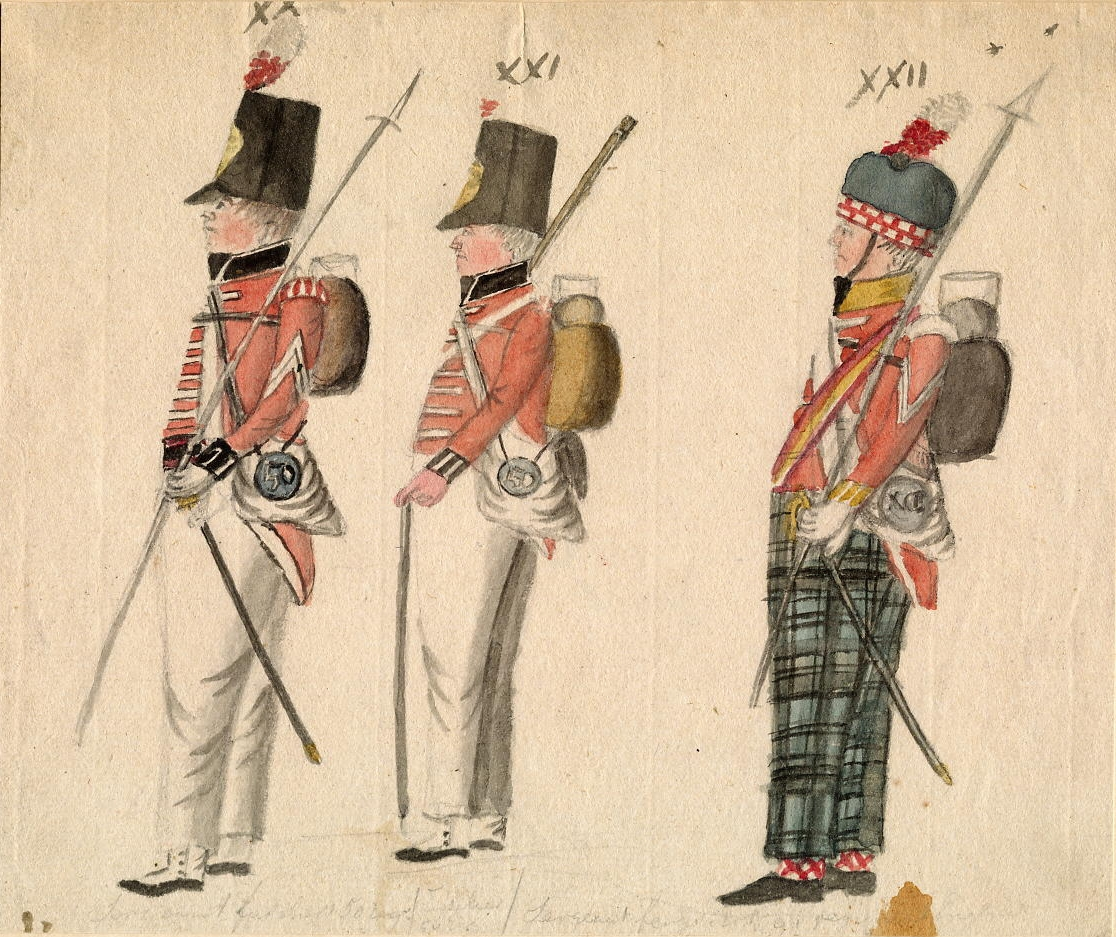
1809 illustration of a regimental sergeant (right)

A second battalion was raised in Perth in August 1804. The 1st Battalion embarked as part of the Hanover Expedition in December 1805 and, after service in Germany, returned to England in February 1806. The battalion embarked for Portugal in June 1808 for service in the Peninsular War. It took part in the Battle of Roliça in August 1808 and the Battle of Vimeiro later that month before fighting under Lieutenant-General Sir John Moore at the Battle of Corunna in January 1809 and then taking part in the subsequent evacuation from the Peninsula. The regiment lost its territorial designation being renamed the 91st Regiment of Foot in April 1809. This change saw their uniform no longer include the kilt, which did not return until 1881. The 1st Battalion took part in the disastrous Walcheren Campaign in autumn 1809.

The 1st Battalion returned to the Peninsula in September 1812 and saw action at the Battle of Vitoria in June 1813 and the Battle of Sorauren in July 1813. It then pursued the French Army into France and fought at the Battle of the Nive in November 1813, the Battle of Nivelle in December 1813 and the Battle of Orthez in February 1814 as well as the Battle of Toulouse in April 1814.

The 1st Battalion embarked for Ostend in April 1815 and, under the command of Lieutenant Colonel William Douglas, undertook the important task of covering the road to Brussels while the Battle of Waterloo was taking place in June 1815. The battalion formed part of the 6th Brigade under Major General George Johnstone which in turn formed part of the 4th Division under Sir Charles Colville's. The battalion also formed one of the columns that stormed the fortress town of Cambrai later that month. It returned to England in November 1818.

Meanwhile, the 2nd Battalion embarked for Germany in July 1813 and took part in the unsuccessful attack on Bergen op Zoom in March 1814 before returning home in September 1814. It was disbanded at Perth in December 1815.

=== The Victorian era ===
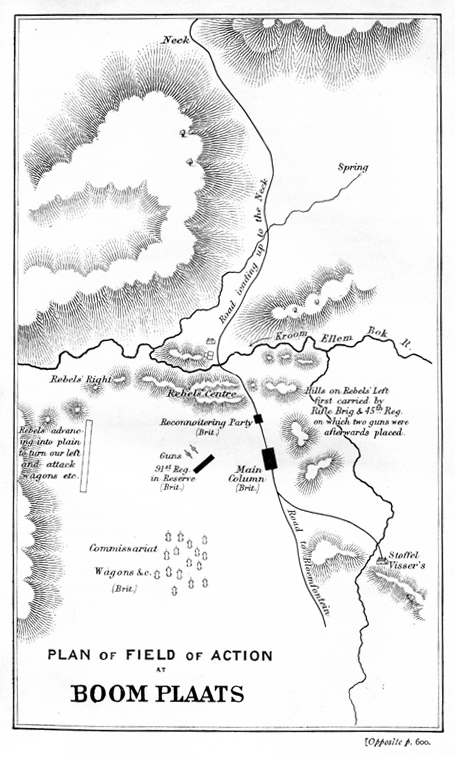
The Battle of Boomplaats, August 1848

The regiment regained its territorial designation being renamed the 91st (or Argyllshire) Regiment of Foot in November 1820. It embarked for the West Indies in June 1821 and was garrisoned in Jamaica before returning to England in 1831. Three companies were deployed to Saint Helena in November 1835 and with the exception of one detachment, then sailed on to South Africa in June 1839. The detachment that remained in Saint Helena was tasked with disinterring the body of the late Emperor Napoleon and transferring it with ceremony to the French contingent on the wharf.

In April 1842 the regiment formed a reserve battalion. The 1st Battalion took part in various actions in the 7th Xhosa War during 1846 and left South Africa for home in January 1848. Meanwhile, the Reserve Battalion also took part in the 7th Xhosa War during 1846, then saw action against the Boers at the Battle of Boomplaats in August 1848 and went on to fight in the 8th Xhosa War during 1850. The Reserve Battalion left South Africa in July 1855 and continued life in the form of a series of depot companies until being formally disbanded in March 1857.

The 1st Battalion embarked for Malta in December 1854 and for Greece in February 1855 before travelling on to the Ionian Islands in February 1857. It embarked for Alexandria in September 1858 and took the overground route to India to help suppress the Indian Rebellion. It was renamed the 91st (the Argyllshire Highlanders) Regiment of Foot in May 1864 and embarked for England in October 1868. Following the marriage between Princess Louise and John Campbell, Marquis of Lorne at St George's Chapel, Windsor Castle in March 1871, at which the regiment formed a guard of honour, the regiment was renamed the 91st (Princess Louise's Argyllshire Highlanders) Regiment of Foot in August 1872. It was then dispatched to South Africa in February 1879 for service in the Anglo-Zulu war and fought at the Battle of Gingindlovu in April 1879 before lifting the Siege of Eshowe later that month.

As part of the Cardwell Reforms of the 1870s, where single-battalion regiments were linked together to share a single depot and recruiting district in the United Kingdom, the 91st was linked with the 72nd Regiment, Duke of Albany's Own Highlanders, and assigned to district no. 58 at Stirling Castle. On 1 July 1881 the Childers Reforms came into effect and the regiment amalgamated with the 93rd (Sutherland Highlanders) Regiment of Foot to form the Argyll and Sutherland Highlanders.

== Battle honours ==
Battle honours won by the regiment were:

- Peninsular War: Rolica, Vimiera, Corunna, Pyrenees, Nive, Nivelle, Orthes, Toulouse, Peninsula

== Colonels of the Regiment ==
Colonels of the Regiment were:

91st (Argyllshire Highlanders) Regiment of Foot

- 1796–1837: Gen. Duncan Campbell of Lochnell

91st (Argyllshire) Regiment of Foot – (1820)

- 1837–1855: Gen. Gabriel Gordon
- 1855–1861: Gen. Hon. Sir Charles Stephen Gore, GCB, KH
- 1861–1864: Lt-Gen. Charles Murray Hay

91st (the Argyllshire Highlanders) Regiment of Foot – (1864)

- 1864–1870: Gen. Charles George James Arbuthnot

91st (Princess Louise's Argyllshire Highlanders) Regiment of Foot – (1872)

- 1870–1881: Gen. James Robertson Craufurd

== Sources ==
- Goff, Gerald Lionel Joseph (1891). Historical records of the 91st Argyllshire Highlanders, now the 1st Battalion Princess Louise's Argyll and Sutherland Highlanders, containing an account of the Regiment in 1794, and of its subsequent services to 1881. London: R. Bentley.
- Carman, W. Y. (1985), Richard Simkin's Uniforms of the British Army: The Infantry Regiments, Great Britain: Webb and Bower Publishers, ISBN 0-86350-031-5
