= James Stirling of Garden =

British army officer and Lord Lieutenant of Stirling and Falkirk from 1983 to 2005

Sir James Stirling of Garden, KCVO CBE GCStJ (8 September 1930 – 22 July 2024) was a British army officer and chartered surveyor, who served as Lord Lieutenant of Stirling and Falkirk from 1983 to 2005.

== Biography ==
The son of a colonel and a scion of the Garden branch of Clan Stirling, Stirling attended Rugby School and Trinity College, Cambridge. He was commissioned into the Army, commanded the Argyll and Sutherland Highlanders and served in the Korean War; after leaving active service, he held commands in the Territorial Army in the 1960s and was honorary colonel of the 3rd Battalion of the 51st Highland Volunteers (1979–86). In the meantime, he also practised as a chartered surveyor and became a partner in K. Ryden and Partners in 1962. He left the company in 1989. He also sat on the boards of Woolwich Building Society and the Scottish Widows and Life Insurance Fund.

By this time, he had already taken an active role in local affairs. He was appointed a deputy lieutenant for Stirling in 1970 and served as vice-lieutenant between 1979 and 1983, when he became lord lieutenant. Stirling was appointed a Commander of the Order of the British Empire (CBE) in the 1987 Birthday Honours, and a Knight Commander of the Royal Victorian Order (KCVO) in the 2006 New Year Honours, the year after he retired as lord lieutenant. He was also awarded an honorary degree by the University of Stirling in 2004, and the following year was made a Bailiff Grand Cross of the Order Saint John (GCStJ); he was Prior of the Order in Scotland between 1995 and 2009. He also received the Service Medal of the Order of St John for his long service to the order of St John.

Stirling died of a chest infection on 22 July 2024, at the age of 93.

Honorary titles
Preceded by Frederick Graham	Lord Lieutenant of Stirling and Falkirk; 1983–2005	Succeeded by Marjory McLachlan
