= William Douglas of Balgillo =

British Army officer

Colonel Sir William Douglas (c. 1778 – 25 August 1818) K.C.B., was a British Army officer during the Napoleonic Wars.

== Biography ==
He was the son of William Douglas of Brigton (died 1814), and his wife Elizabeth Graham, daughter of Robert Graham, 11th of Fintry. He served at the Cape of Good Hope in 1795. He was promoted to major in 74th Foot on 4 December 1796. He joined the 91st Foot in 1798. He was promoted a brevet Lieutenant-Colonel 1 January 1800.

He served on the Hanover expedition in 1805 and fought in the Peninsular War from August 1808 to June 1809. While in theatre he was promoted to Lieutenant-Colonel of 91st Foot on 25 November 1808 and commanded the 1st Battalion from 1808 to 1818. He served in the Walcheren expedition of 1809; again in Iberia and then France under Wellington from January 1813 to April 1814. He obtained the rank of brevet Colonel on 4 June 1814. He served in Waterloo Campaign of 1815, during which he led one of the columns that stormed Cambray on 24 June 1815. He was awarded the Army Gold Cross (one of only 163 so honoured). He died in August 1818 at Valenciennes in France.
