= Sorn Castle =

Castle in East Ayrshire, Scotland

Coordinates: 55.514289°N 4.301046°W

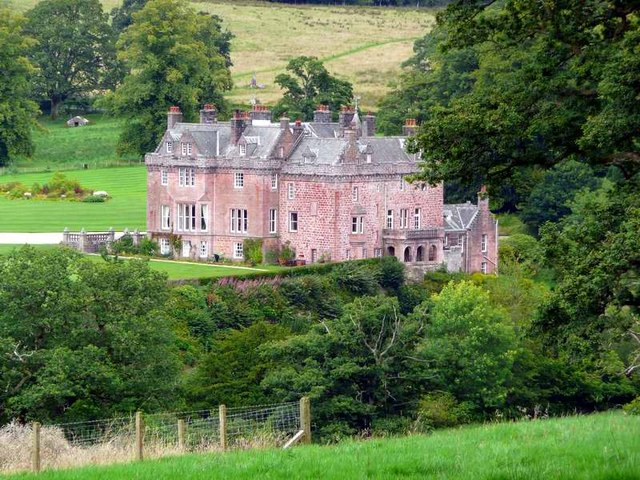
Sorn Castle

Sorn Castle is located by the River Ayr just outside the village of Sorn in East Ayrshire, Scotland. The castle comprises a medieval tower house, which was extended over the years, and remodelled in the Scots Baronial style by David Bryce in the 1860s. The castle is protected as a category A listed building.

== History ==
A tablet on the castle wall states "Extant AD 1409, Added to AD 1783, Restored AD 1865, Enlarged AD 1909".

The original three-storey tower house is located at the south-west of the present building, and was constructed in the 15th century, or possibly earlier. This tower was extended westwards in the 16th century. Additions were made in the late 18th century in a castellated style. In the 1860s the Somervell family owned the castle, and commissioned David Bryce to remodel the building. Sorn Castle was bought in 1908 by Thomas W. McIntyre, who commissioned a new entrance from architect Henry Edward Clifford and carried out internal remodelling.

=== Royal visits ===
In September 1598 the wedding of Ludovic Stewart, 2nd Duke of Lennox and Jean Campbell, a great-granddaughter of James IV of Scotland, was celebrated with a banquet at Sorn attended by James VI, who stayed two nights. At Fenwick, the "King's Stable" and the "King's Well" were said to be named from a visit of James VI or his grandfather James V to Sorn and the area.

== Notable residents ==
- James Somervell
- James Gordon McIntyre, Lord Sorn
