= George Younger, 4th Viscount Younger of Leckie =

British politician and banker (1931-2003)

The Right Honourable The Viscount Younger of Leckie KT KCVO TD PC FRSGS
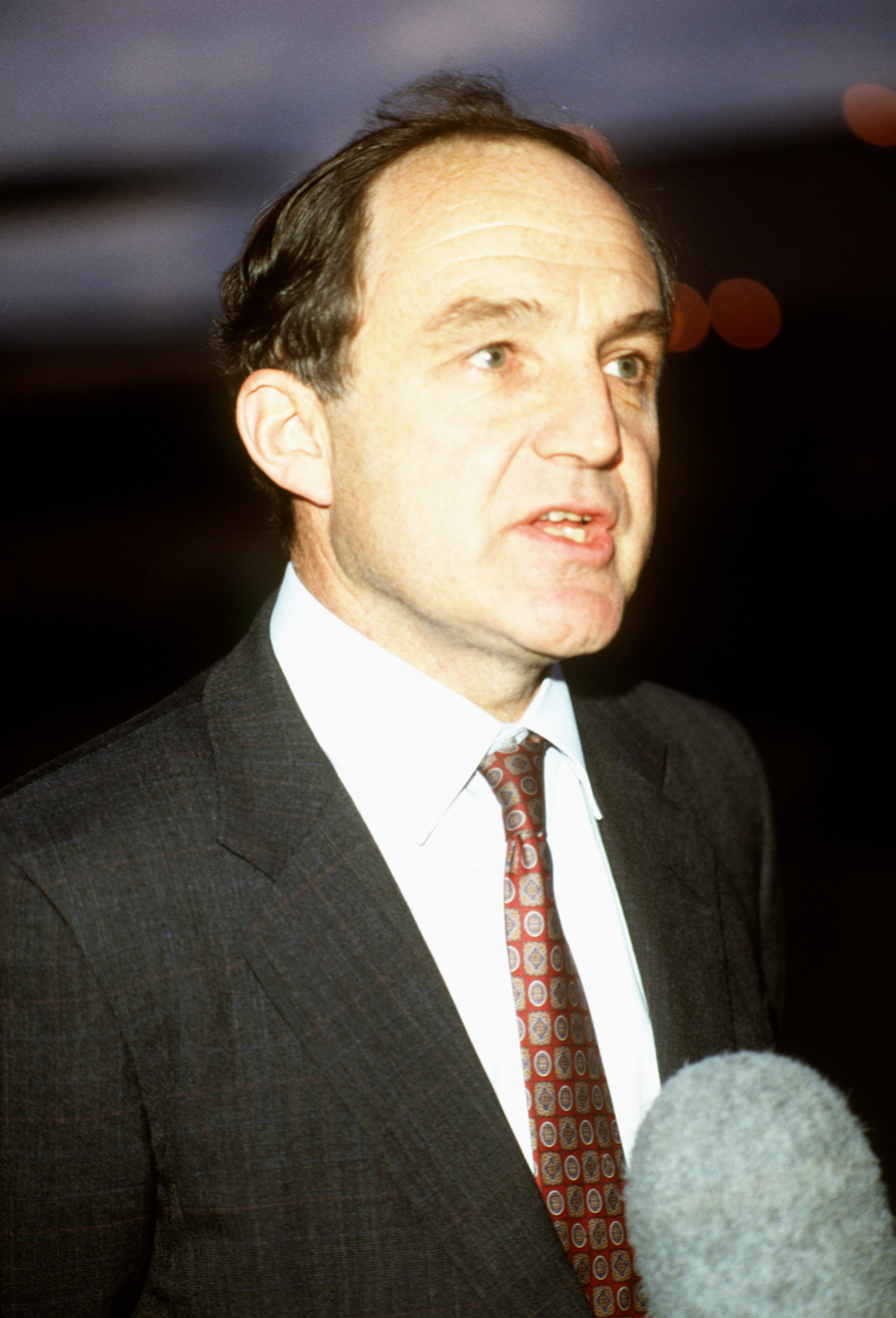
- Younger in 1987

Secretary of State for Defence
- In office 9 January 1986 – 24 July 1989
- Prime Minister: Margaret Thatcher
- Preceded by: Michael Heseltine
- Succeeded by: Tom King

Secretary of State for Scotland
- In office 4 May 1979 – 9 January 1986
- Prime Minister: Margaret Thatcher
- Preceded by: Bruce Millan
- Succeeded by: Malcolm Rifkind

Shadow Secretary of State for Defence
- In office 18 February 1975 – 15 January 1976
- Leader: Margaret Thatcher
- Preceded by: Peter Walker
- Succeeded by: Ian Gilmour

Minister of State for Defence
- In office 8 January 1974 – 4 March 1974
- Prime Minister: Edward Heath
- Preceded by: Ian Gilmour
- Succeeded by: William Rodgers

Parliamentary Under-Secretary of State for Scotland
- In office 24 June 1970 – 8 January 1974
- Prime Minister: Edward Heath
- Preceded by: Bruce Millan
- Succeeded by: Teddy Taylor

Member of the House of Lords
- Lord Temporal
- Hereditary peerage 25 June 1997 – 11 November 1999
- Preceded by: The 3rd Viscount Younger of Leckie
- Succeeded by: Seat abolished
- Life peerage 7 July 1992 – 26 January 2003

Member of Parliament for Ayr
- In office 15 October 1964 – 16 March 1992
- Preceded by: Thomas Moore
- Succeeded by: Phil Gallie

Personal details
- Born: George Kenneth Hotson Younger; 22 September 1931 Stirling, Scotland
- Died: 26 January 2003 (aged 71) Gargunnock, Scotland
- Party: Conservative (1965–2003)
- Other political affiliations: Unionist (until 1965)
- Spouse: Diana Tuck (m. 1954)
- Children: 4, including James
- Education: New College, Oxford

Military service
- Allegiance: United Kingdom
- Branch/service: British Army
- Unit: Argyll and Sutherland Highlanders
- Battles/wars: Korean War

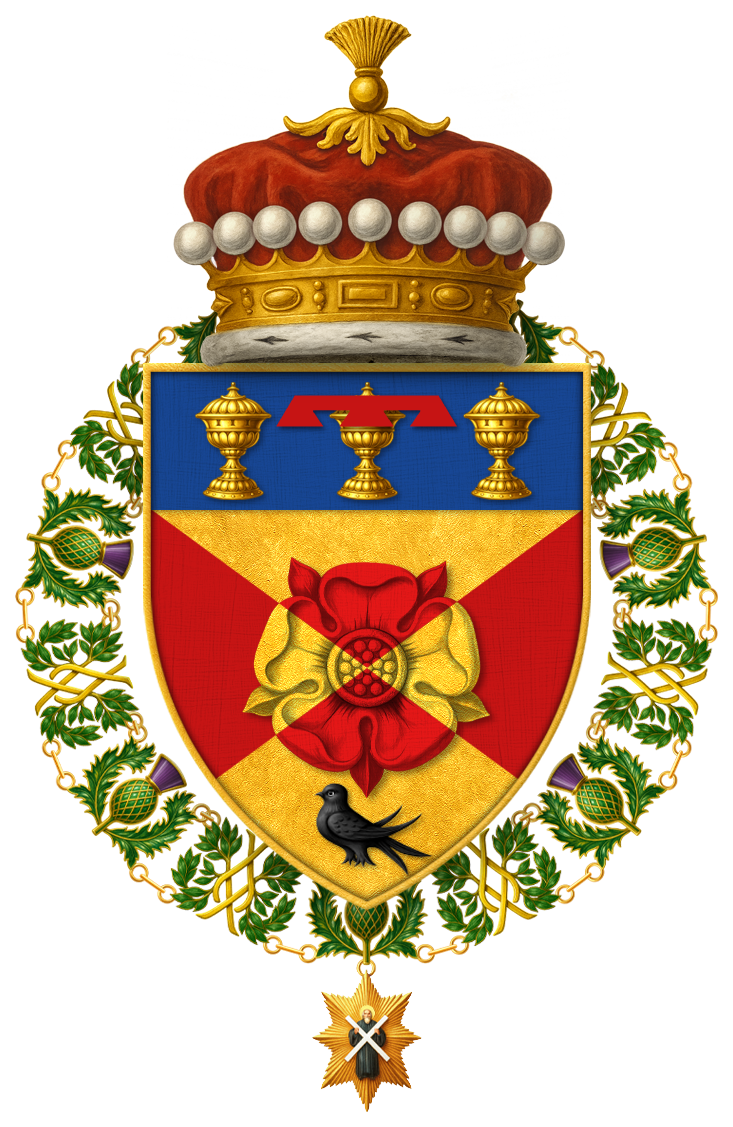
Shield of Arms of George Kenneth Hotson Younger, 4th Viscount Younger of Leckie, KT, KCVO, TD, PC, FRSGS

George Kenneth Hotson Younger, 4th Viscount Younger of Leckie, Baron Younger of Prestwick (22 September 1931 – 26 January 2003), was a British Conservative Party politician and banker. He was the Member of Parliament (MP) for Ayr from 1964 to 1992. During the premiership of Margaret Thatcher, Younger served as Secretary of State for Scotland from 1979 to 1986, and as Secretary of State for Defence from 1986 to 1989.

== Early life and career ==
Younger's forebear, George Younger (baptised 1722), was the founder of George Younger and Son of Alloa, the family's brewing business (not to be confused with Younger's of Edinburgh). Younger's great-grandfather, George Younger, was created Viscount Younger of Leckie in 1923. Younger was the eldest of the three sons of Edward Younger, 3rd Viscount Younger of Leckie.

He was born in Stirling in 1931 and educated at Cargilfield Preparatory School, Winchester College, and New College, Oxford, where he obtained a Master's degree. Joining the British Army, he served in the Korean War with the Argyll & Sutherland Highlanders. On 7 August 1954, he married Diana Tuck, daughter of a Royal Navy captain. They had four children, including James Younger, who succeeded his father to the Viscountcy.

== Political career ==
He first stood for Parliament, unsuccessfully, in North Lanarkshire in the 1959 general election. Subsequently, he was initially selected to stand for the Kinross and West Perthshire seat in a by-election in late 1963, but agreed to stand aside to allow the new Prime Minister Alec Douglas-Home the chance to enter the House of Commons. He was viewed as a one-nation conservative.

Following in the footsteps of his great-grandfather the 1st Viscount, Younger became Member of Parliament for Ayr in 1964 and served as Margaret Thatcher's Secretary of State for Scotland for seven years. He subsequently succeeded Michael Heseltine as Secretary of State for Defence in 1986 when Heseltine resigned from the cabinet over a dispute about helicopters known as the Westland affair. In the 1987 general election, as part of a considerable swing away from the Conservatives in Scotland, he retained his seat after three recounts, by a majority of just 182 votes (having been almost 8,000 votes in 1983). Incidentally, it was held by his successor Phil Gallie by an even smaller majority of 85 votes in 1992.

== After parliament ==
Younger quit the cabinet in 1989, and joined the Royal Bank of Scotland, becoming its chairman in 1992. He was created a life peer as Baron Younger of Prestwick, of Ayr in the District of Kyle and Carrick, on 7 July 1992, five years before succeeding to the viscountcy. As such, he continued to sit in the House of Lords after the passage of the House of Lords Act 1999 which expelled most of the hereditary peers. In 1995, the Queen appointed him a knight of the Order of the Thistle. Younger became Chancellor of Edinburgh's Napier University in 1993, and was Commissioner to the General Assembly of the Church of Scotland for 2001 and 2002.

Younger died from cancer at his home in Gargunnock on 26 January 2003, at the age of 71.

== Sources ==
- Torrance, David, The Scottish Secretaries (Birlinn 2006)
- Burke's Peerage & Baronetage (106th edition, 1999). Editor-in-chief: Charles Mosley; publisher: Burke's Peerage (Genealogical Books) Ltd.

Parliament of the United Kingdom
Preceded by Thomas Moore	Member of Parliament for Ayr; 1964–1992	Succeeded by Phil Gallie
Political offices
Preceded by Peter Walker	Shadow Secretary of State for Defence; 1975–1976	Succeeded by Ian Gilmour
Preceded by Bruce Millan	Secretary of State for Scotland; 1979–1986	Succeeded by Malcolm Rifkind
Preceded by Michael Heseltine	Secretary of State for Defence; 1986–1989	Succeeded by Tom King
Peerage of the United Kingdom
Preceded by Edward Younger	Viscount Younger of Leckie; 1997–2003	Succeeded by James Younger
