= Edward Craufurd =

Scottish politician

Edward Henry John Craufurd (9 December 1816 – 29 August 1887) was a Scottish Radical politician.

He was the eldest son of John Craufurd of Auchenames and Kerse in the counties of Renfrewshire and Ayr, Treasurer General of the Ionian Islands, and Sophia Marianne Churchill, daughter of Major General Churchill and great-granddaughter of Sir Robert Walpole.

He was educated at Trinity College, Cambridge, where he obtained a scholarship in 1840 and graduated as 12th senior optime. He was called to the bar at the Inner Temple in 1845 and practised on the Home Circuit and attended the Surrey Sessions. He was editor of The Legal Examiner

In 1860 he married Frances, daughter of the Rev William Molesworth, Rector of St Breock, Cornwall, and sister of the Rev Sir Paul William Molesworth, 10th Baronet of Pencarrow and niece of James Wentworth Buller, MP for North Devon.

He was a Deputy Lieutenant and Justice of the Peace for Buteshire and a DL and JP for Ayrshire. He was a member of the English Law Amendment Society and the Scottish Society for promoting the Amendment of the Law. He promoted the Scotch Affirmation Act, the Jurors Affirmation Act and the Judgments Extension Act 1868.

He was Member of Parliament for Ayr Burghs from 1852 until 1874.

== Sources ==
- Debrett's House of Commons, 1870
- Clan Crawford Association

Parliament of the United Kingdom
Preceded by Lord Patrick Crichton-Stuart	Member of Parliament for Ayr Burghs; 1852 – 1874	Succeeded by Sir William Montgomery-Cuninghame, Bt
