= James Somervell =

British politician (1845–1924)

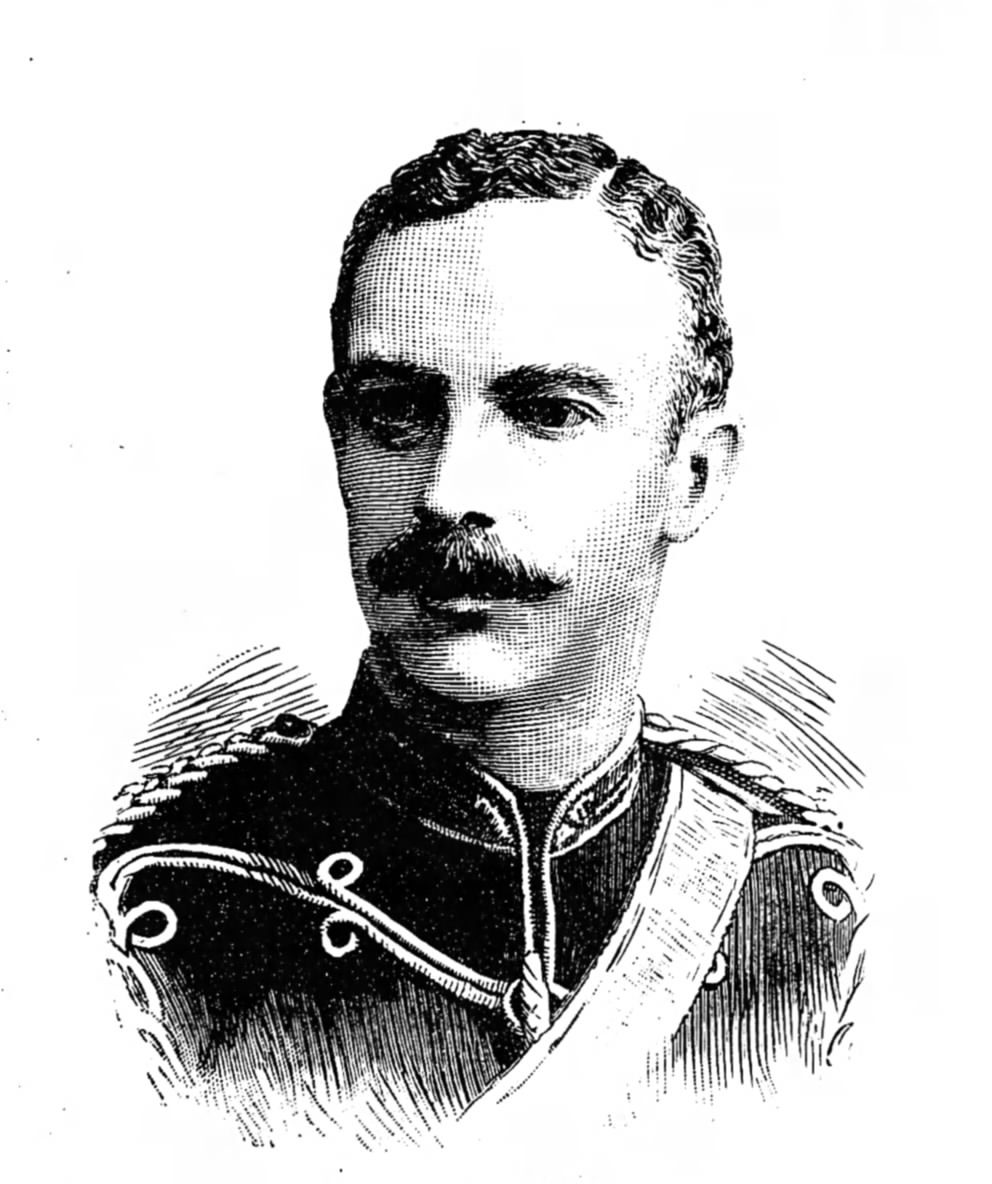

Member of Parliament for Ayr Burghs
- In office 25 March 1890 – 28 June 1892
- Preceded by: John Sinclair
- Succeeded by: William Birkmyre
- Majority: 130

Personal details
- Born: 1845
- Died: 1924
- Party: Conservative
- Spouse: Kathleen Emilie Maclaine
- Education: University of Oxford

Military service
- Branch/service: British Army
- Rank: Captain

James Somervell (1845–1924) was Conservative MP for Ayr Burghs. He won a by-election in 1890, but he lost his seat to William Birkmyre, the Liberal candidate, in the 1892 general election. He had earlier contested the 1885 general election for the Conservatives, but lost to the Scottish Liberal Party candidate Archibald Corbett.

Somervell inherited Sorn Castle and its estate from his father Graham Somervell (born Graham Russell) in 1881, but sold it to the McIntyre family in 1907.

Somervell studied at Harrow School and University of Oxford and was called to the bar in 1870. In 1884 he set up the company Sorn Dairy Supply which sold dairy products from the estate in Sorn through a number of premises in Glasgow. The Glasgow International Exhibition (1901) included a working model dairy farm run by Somervell.

Somervell married Kathleen Emilie Maclaine in 1892 and they had four children (one died at a very young age), but after his wife discovered he was having an affair with the children's former nurse that produced a child, she sought a divorce that was granted in 1900.

In 1904 Somervell stood trial in the High Court in Edinburgh on a charge of assaulting and firing a gun at the accountant Francis More who administered the Sorn Castle estate. More claimed that Somervell threatened to shoot him and the gun went off during a subsequent struggle, while Somervell claimed that More "rushed" him after noticing the gun in his pocket and it was then discharged during the struggle. Somervell was acquitted by the jury.

Parliament of the United Kingdom
Preceded by John Sinclair	Member of Parliament for Ayr Burghs; 1890 – 1892	Succeeded by William Birkmyre
