= Sir Thomas Moore, 1st Baronet =

Scottish Unionist Party politician

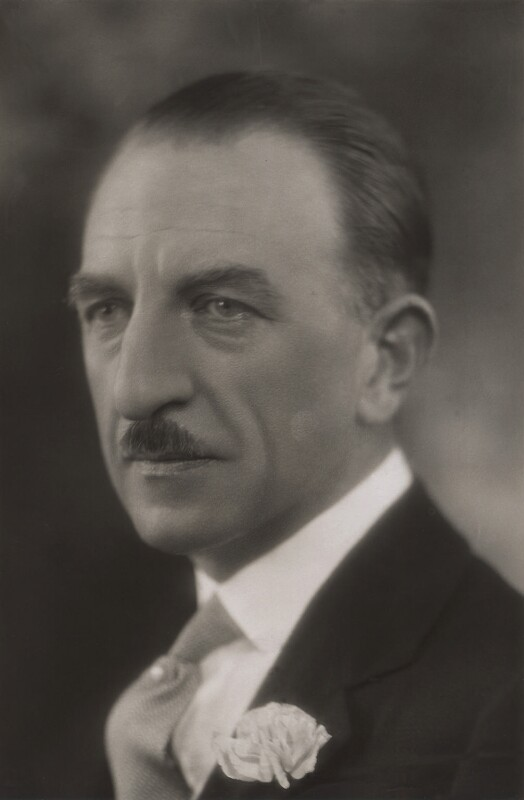
Moore in 1928

Sir Thomas Cecil Russell Moore, 1st Baronet, CBE (16 September 1886 – 9 April 1971) was a long-serving Scottish Unionist Party politician. He was elected Member of Parliament (MP) for Ayr Burghs in a 1925 by-election, and served until his retirement in 1964, when he was succeeded by George Younger. Moore was created a Baronet, of Kyleburn in the County of Ayr, in 1956. He died in April 1971, aged 84, when the baronetcy became extinct. In the mid-1930s Moore, a Colonel in the British Army, wrote widely in the UK press in support of Adolf Hitler and the policies of Nazism.

Parliament of the United Kingdom
Preceded by Sir John Baird	Member of Parliament for Ayr Burghs; 1925–1950	constituency abolished
New constituency	Member of Parliament for Ayr; 1950–1964	Succeeded by George Younger
Baronetage of the United Kingdom
New creation	Baronet (of Kyleburn); 1956–1971	Extinct
