= William Birkmyre =

British politician

William Birkmyre (1838 – 19 April 1900) was Liberal Member of Parliament (MP) for Ayr Burghs from 1892 to 1895.

The son of William Birkmyre, sometime Provost of Port Glasgow, he was a member of the town council there, before going to Calcutta to work on the family's jute mills. After returning to the United Kingdom, he entered Parliament in 1892, serving one term.

He died at Marseilles in 1900 while visiting France.

Parliament of the United Kingdom
Preceded by James Somervell	Member of Parliament for Ayr Burghs; 1892 – 1895	Succeeded by Charles Lindsay Orr-Ewing
