= Edward Colville =

British Army general (1905–1982)

Major-General Edward Colville CB DSO & Bar DL
- Born: 1 September 1905; St George Hanover Square, London, England
- Died: 10 January 1982 (aged 76); Stoughton, West Sussex, England
- Spouse: Barbara Joan Denny (m. 1934)
- Military career
- Allegiance: United Kingdom
- Branch: British Army
- Service years: 1925–1959
- Rank: Major-General
- Service number: 33658
- Unit: Gordon Highlanders
- Commands: 2nd Battalion, Gordon Highlanders; 227th Infantry Brigade; 128th Infantry Brigade; 51st (Highland) Infantry Division
- Conflicts: Second World War; North West Europe; Malayan Emergency
- Awards: Companion of the Order of the Bath; Distinguished Service Order & Bar; Mentioned in dispatches

Major-General Edward Charles Colville CB DSO & Bar DL (1 September 1905 – 10 January 1982) was a senior British Army officer. He commanded a brigade during Operation Plunder, the crossing of the Rhine, in March 1945 during the Second World War. He both planned and executed his brigade's successful attack. After serving as Chief of Staff at Headquarters Far East Land Forces in June 1954 during the Malayan Emergency, he spent three years as General Officer Commanding 51st (Highland) Division in a home defence role.

== Military career ==
Born the son of Admiral Sir Stanley Colville and Adelaide Jane Meade, Colville was educated at Marlborough College and commissioned into the Gordon Highlanders on 3 September 1925.

Colville served for two years from 1932 to 1934 as aide-de-camp to Vere Ponsonby, 9th Earl of Bessborough who was at that time officiating as Governor-General of Canada. In July 1934, towards the end of his tour in Canada, Colville spent nine days on an Atlantic salmon fishing trip with four other Canadian officials, including the governor-general, on the Jupiter River on Anticosti Island, in the Minganie Regional County Municipality of Quebec. He later contributed to a book that the five officials wrote and published about their experiences on the river. (Note: The five officials on the trip were Bessborough, Alan Lascelles, Viscount Duncannon, Lieutenant-Colonel Eric Dighton Mackenzie, and Edward Colville. They wrote and published under the collective pen name "Baldemec", taken from their initials.)

Colville was then appointed adjutant of the Gordons on 18 November 1937. Participating in the Second World War, Colville was promoted from captain to major on 3 September 1942. He became commanding officer of the 2nd Battalion, Gordon Highlanders, in September 1943. Part of the 227th Infantry Brigade, he led the battalion ashore on 18 June 1944 to fight in the Normandy Campaign.

Colville assumed command of the 227th Brigade, as a temporary brigadier, when on 15 July 1944 Brigadier John Mackintosh-Walker was killed in an attack on his scout car; on 19 October Colville was appointed a Companion of the Distinguished Service Order (DSO) for his actions with the Gordon Highlanders in the campaign.

Colville was closely involved in Operation Plunder, the crossing of the Rhine, near Xanten in March 1945. He planned the 227th Brigade's attack, codenamed "Operation Nap", to assault with 10th Battalion, Highland Light Infantry on the right and 2nd Battalion, Argyll and Sutherland Highlanders on the left, aiming to seize the villages of Overkamp and Lohr respectively. The 2nd Battalion Gordon Highlanders would then cross and relieve the other two battalions, which would in turn advance to take the villages of Bellinguoven and Wisshof. Colville led the brigade during the subsequent chaotic (Note: Some of Colville's tracked landing vehicles became stuck in the mud on the far side, and his troops came under heavy fire leading to many casualties. His forward observation post was wiped out and one his battalions suffered over 100 casualties.) but completely successful river crossing, which was crucial for the Allied advance into Germany. It has been described by Warfare History Network as the "Greatest Assault River Crossing of All Time".

Towards the end of the campaign, on 30 April, Colville negotiated the surrender of the German city of Geesthacht, including a store of V-1 flying bomb fuel and poison gas. For his command of the brigade he received a bar to the DSO on 10 May and was mentioned in despatches on 4 April 1946.

After the war Colville became Defence adviser in Canada in December 1946, was promoted to colonel on 31 March 1949, and in November was appointed commander of the 128th Infantry Brigade, moving to become Assistant Chief of Staff (Operations) at British Army of the Rhine in June 1952. Promoted to substantive brigadier on 1 September 1953, he was further advanced to temporary major-general on 29 June 1954, and appointed to serve as Chief of Staff at Headquarters Far East Land Forces during the Malayan Emergency. Promoted to substantive major-general on 7 July 1955, for his services in the Far East Colville was appointed a Companion of the Order of the Bath on 25 October. He relinquished his post in Malaya on 15 January 1956, and in March received his final posting as General Officer Commanding 51st (Highland) Division, which was a Territorial Army unit in a home defence role. He retired on 12 April 1959.

In retirement Colville served as a deputy lieutenant of West Sussex but also had a home at Balformo House near Scone in Perthshire.

Colville died in January 1982, aged 76.

== Family ==
In 1934, Colville married Barbara Joan Denny; they had one son and two daughters.

== Works ==
- Baldemec (1934). A Week On The Jupiter River Anticosti Island. Privately published. (Colville was one of the five authors who contributed to the book under the collective pen name "Baldemec".)

== Bibliography ==
- Martin, H. G. (1948). The History of the Fifteenth Scottish Division 1939–1945. London: William Blackwood & Sons. OCLC 1401785744.
- Saunders, Tim (2006). Operation Plunder : the British & Canadian Operations. Havertown: Pen & Sword Military. ISBN 978-1-78346-079-3. OCLC 854974757.

Military offices
Preceded by James Scott-Elliot	GOC 51st (Highland) Infantry Division; 1956–1959	Succeeded by Frederick Graham
