= Lord Lieutenant of Stirling and Falkirk =

Ceremonial officer in Stirling and Falkirk, Scotland

This is a list of people who have served as Lord Lieutenant of Stirling and Falkirk. This office replaced the Lord Lieutenant of Stirlingshire in 1975.

- Edward Younger, 3rd Viscount Younger of Leckie 1975–1979 (previously Lord Lieutenant of Stirlingshire)
- Maj-Gen. Frederick Graham 26 September 1979 – 1983
- Lt-Col. James Stirling of Garden 30 November 1983 – 2005
- Marjory McLachlan 28 November 2005 – 15 February 2017
- Alan Simpson 28 February 2017
- Colonel Charles Wallace 26 March 2025
