= George Younger, 1st Viscount Younger of Leckie =

British politician (1851–1929)

The Right Honourable The Viscount Younger of Leckie
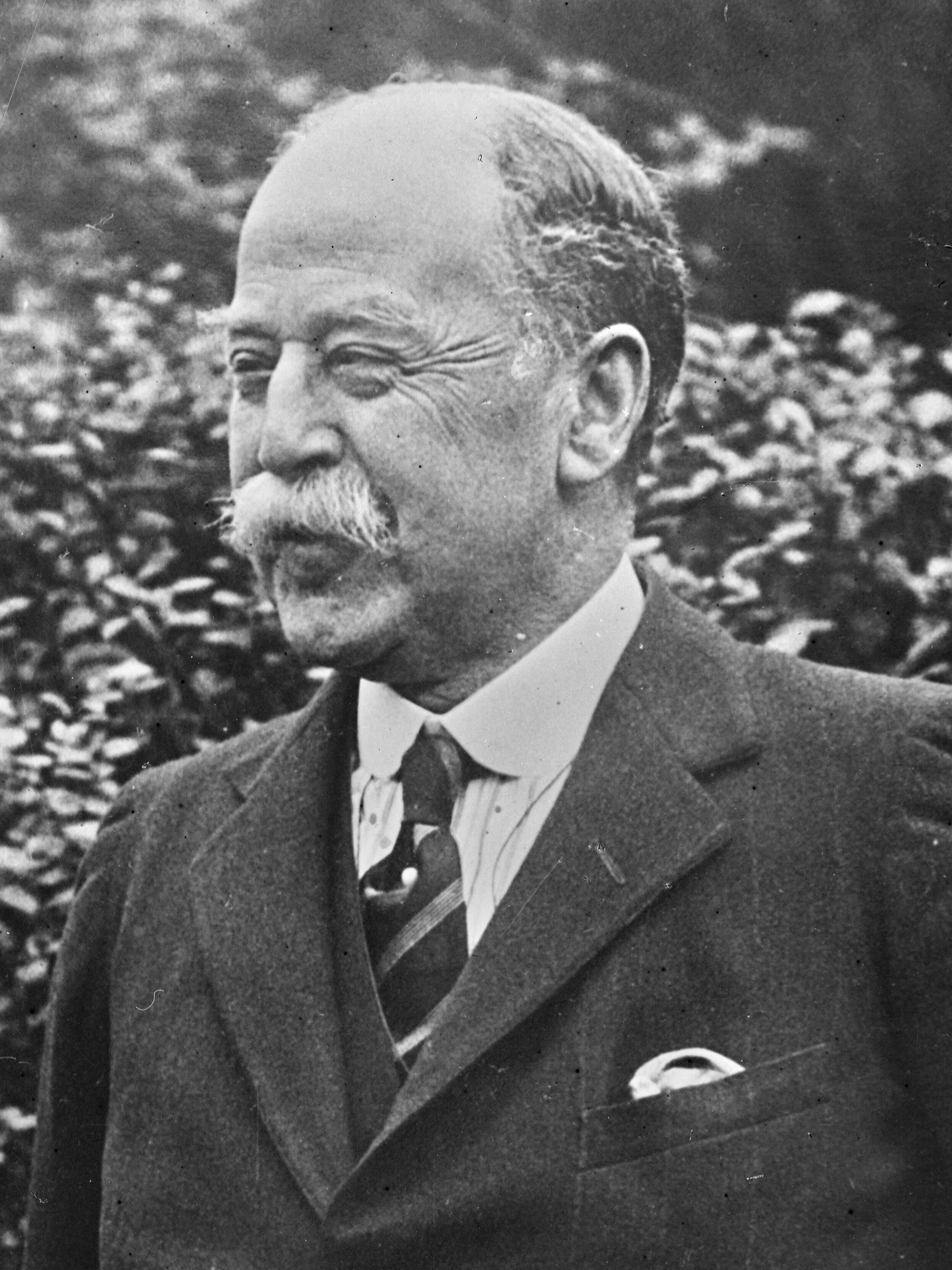
- Younger in 1923
- Born: 13 October 1851
- Died: 29 April 1929 (aged 77)
- Education: Edinburgh Academy
- Occupations: Businessman, politician
- Political party: Conservative Party

George Younger, 1st Viscount Younger of Leckie (13 October 1851 – 29 April 1929), known as Sir George Younger, 1st Baronet between 1911 and 1923, was a British politician.

== Early life ==
George Younger was born on 13 October 1851. He was educated at Edinburgh Academy.

== Career ==
Younger left college at the age of 17 on his father's death to run the family brewery of George Younger and Son, the business founded by his great-grandfather, George Younger (baptised 17 February 1722), of Alloa, Clackmannanshire. He became chairman in 1897.

Younger was a deputy lieutenant of Clackmannanshire from November 1901, and Unionist Party member of parliament for Ayr Burghs from 1906 until 1922. He was also chairman of the Unionist Party Organisation from 1916 to 1923, and treasurer of the Unionist Party in 1923. He was created a baronet on 12 July 1911, and later Viscount Younger of Leckie on 20 February 1923.

== Death and legacy ==
Younger died on 29 April 1929. One of his great-grandsons was the Conservative politician George Younger, 4th Viscount Younger of Leckie (1931–2003), who held ministerial office as Secretary of State for Scotland from 1979 to 1986, and Secretary of State for Defence from 1986 to 1989.

== Family ==
His son, Charles, was a first-class cricketer who was killed in the First World War.

Parliament of the United Kingdom
Preceded by Joseph Dobbie	Member of Parliament for Ayr Burghs; 1906–1922	Succeeded by Sir John Lawrence Baird
Honorary titles
Preceded by The Duke of Montrose	Lord Lieutenant of Stirlingshire; 1925–1929	Succeeded by William Laurence Pullar
Party political offices
Preceded by Arthur Steel-Maitland	Chairman of the Conservative Party; 1916–1923	Succeeded by Stanley Jackson
Peerage of the United Kingdom
New creation	Viscount Younger of Leckie; 1923–1929	Succeeded by James Younger
Baronetage of the United Kingdom
New creation	Baronet (of Leckie); 1911–1929	Succeeded by James Younger
