= John Sinclair (Ayr Burghs MP) =

Rev John Sinclair (1842–1892) was a Liberal Party politician in the United Kingdom. He was elected as a Member of Parliament for Ayr Burghs, in Scotland, in 1888, resigning in 1890 by becoming Steward of the Manor of Northstead.

== Life ==
He was born on 6 November 1842 in Latheron, Caithness the son of Rev John Sinclair, and his wife, Dorothea Wilson. He was baptised into the Church of Scotland on 21 November 1842.

He was educated at the High School in Edinburgh, which was then on Calton Hill. He studied Divinity at New College, Edinburgh from 1863 to 1867. His loyalties lay with the Free Church of Scotland and he was ordained in that church at Grangemouth in 1869. In 1878 he moved to the prestigious Barony Church in Glasgow. In 1880 he was translated to St Bernards Free Church in Stockbridge, Edinburgh. He was then living at 2 Learmonth Terrace in Edinburgh's West End.

He resigned from the ministry in 1884 and moved into politics. In 1888 he became MP to Ayr Burghs.

He died at home, Canal Street in Grangemouth, on 7 January 1892.

St Bernards Free Church was on Henderson Row in Edinburgh. It was demolished in the 1980s and replaced by sheltered housing.

== Publications ==
- Heather Bells
- Sabbath Lessons from Westminster
- Tales From the North
- The Church on the Sea
- Scenes and Stories of the North of Scotland (1890)

== Family ==
In October 1871 he married Elizabeth Greig Mackay (1851-1934), daughter of George Grey Mackay, a coalmaster in Grangemouth. They had a daughter Elizabeth Ann Sinclair (b.1873).

Parliament of the United Kingdom
Preceded by Richard Campbell	Member of Parliament for Ayr Burghs; 1888–1890	Succeeded by James Somervell
