= Cuming =

Cuming may refer to:

== People with the surname ==
- Sir Alexander Cuming (1691–1775), Scottish adventurer, chief of the Cherokees
- Fortescue Cuming (1762–1828), Irish-born traveler and author
- Frederick Cuming (cricketer), English cricketer
- Frederick Cuming (artist), British painter
- Geoffrey Cuming (1917–1988), English priest, liturgist, and historian
- Hugh Cuming (1791 – 1865), English collector
- Robert Stevenson Dalton Cuming, British admiral
- Thomas B. Cuming, American politician
- Walter Comyn, Lord of Badenoch, also known as Walter Cuming

== Places ==
- Cuming County, Nebraska
- Cuming Inlet, Nunavut, Canada
- Cuming Museum, within the London Borough of Southwark
- Cuming Township, Cuming County, Nebraska
- Cuming Township, Dodge County, Nebraska

== Other uses ==
- Slang term for ejaculation

== See also ==
- Cumings, Texas
- Cumming (disambiguation)
- Cummings (disambiguation)
- Cumin
