= Cummings =

Cummings may refer to:

== Places ==
=== Canada ===
- Cummings, Saskatchewan, an unincorporated hamlet

=== United States ===
- Cummings, Mendocino County, California, an unincorporated community
- Cummings, Kansas
- Cummings, North Dakota, an unincorporated community
- Cummings Research Park, Huntsville, Alabama
- Cummings Township, Lycoming County, Pennsylvania
- Cummings Mountain (disambiguation)

== Other uses ==
- Cummings (surname)
- USS Cummings, two United States Navy destroyers
- Cummings Jewish Centre for Seniors, in Montreal, Quebec, Canada
- Walt Cummings, a fictional character in the TV series 24
- Cummings, a character in The Diary of a Nobody by George and Weedon Grossmith

== See also ==
- Cummings House (disambiguation)
- Cumming (disambiguation)
- Cummins (disambiguation)
