= Cumming =

Cumming may refer to:

== Places in the United States ==
- Cumming, Georgia, a city
- Cumming, Iowa, a city
- Cumming Township, Michigan

== People ==
- Cumming (surname)
- Clan Cumming, a Scottish clan from the central Highlands

== Other uses ==
- Ejaculation, in males
- Orgasm, in either males or females
- Cumming baronets, a title in the Baronetage of Nova Scotia, Canada
- Cumming Corporation, an American project management firm
- Cumming School of Medicine, Calgary, Alberta, Canada
- Cumming metro station, Santiago, Chile

== See also ==
- Cuming (disambiguation)
- Cummings (disambiguation)
- Cummins (disambiguation)
