= Cummins (disambiguation) =

Cummins is a manufacturer of diesel and natural gas engines.

Cummins may also refer to:

== Places ==
- Cummins, South Australia, a town on the Eyre Peninsula in South Australia
- Cummins Creek Wilderness, on the Oregon coast, US
- Cummins House (disambiguation):
  - Cummins House, Adelaide, South Australia
  - John R. Cummins Farmhouse, Eden Prairie, Minnesota, US
  - David Cummins Octagon House, Conneaut, Ohio, US
- Cummins Memorial Theological Seminary, Summerville, South Carolina, US
- Cummins Unit, in Arkansas, US, formerly Cummins prison farm

== People ==
- Cummins (surname)
- Cummins Jackson (1802–1849), Virginia miller who raised his nephew, General Stonewall Jackson

== Other uses ==
- Cummins UK, the Cummins US distributor for the UK and Ireland
- Clan Cumming

== See also ==
- Cummings (disambiguation)
- Cummin
