= USS Cummings (DD-44) =

Cassin-class destroyer

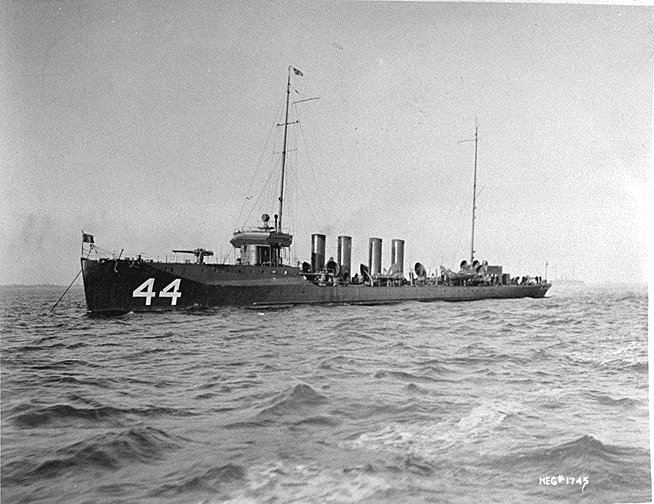
- USS Cummings (DD-44) at anchor, circa 1916.

History

United States
- Name: Cummings
- Namesake: Lieutenant commander Andrew Boyd Cummings
- Builder: Bath Iron Works, Bath, Maine
- Cost: $776,910.48
- Laid down: 21 May 1912
- Launched: 6 August 1913
- Sponsored by: Mrs. H. Beates, Jr., niece of Lieutenant Commander Cummings
- Commissioned: 19 September 1913
- Decommissioned: 23 June 1922
- Stricken: 5 July 1934
- Identification: Hull symbol: DD-44; Code letters: NIL
- Fate: Transferred to the United States Coast Guard, 7 June 1924; Sold for scrapping, 22 August 1934
- Notes: Cummings lost her name to new construction 1 July 1933

United States
- Name: Cummings
- Acquired: 6 June 1924
- Commissioned: 15 May 1925
- Decommissioned: 30 April 1932
- Identification: Hull symbol: CG-3
- Fate: Transferred back to the United States Navy, 23 May 1932

General characteristics
- Class & type: Cassin-class destroyer
- Displacement: 1,020 long tons (1,040 t)
- Length: 305 ft 3 in (93.04 m)
- Beam: 31 ft 2 in (9.50 m)
- Draft: 9 ft 3 in (2.82 m) (mean)
- Installed power: Oil fired boilers; 16,000 ihp (12,000 kW)
- Propulsion: 2 × Direct Drive Turbines With Triple Expansion Cruising Engines; 2 × shafts
- Speed: 29.5 kn (33.9 mph; 54.6 km/h); 30.57 kn (35.18 mph; 56.62 km/h) (Speed on Trial)
- Complement: 5 officers 96 enlisted (USN); 6 officers, 82 enlisted (USCG)
- Armament: USN: 4 × 4 in (100 mm)/50 caliber guns; 8 × 18 inch (450 mm) torpedo tubes (4 × 2); USCG: 3 × 4 in (100 mm)/50 cal guns; 1 × 1-pdr

The first USS Cummings (DD-44) was a Cassin-class destroyer built for the United States Navy prior to the American entry into World War I. The ship was the first U.S. Navy vessel named in honor of Lieutenant Commander Andrew Boyd Cummings, a naval officer who served during the American Civil War. She served in the Atlantic Fleet during World War I, conducting anti-submarine warfare patrols and escort missions. Later transferred to the United States Coast Guard, she served as CG-3 as part of the Rum Patrol during the Prohibition era.

== Construction and commissioning ==
Cummings was laid down at the Bath Iron Works shipyard in Bath, Maine, on 21 May 1912. She was launched on 6 August 1913, sponsored by Mrs. H. Beates Jr., the niece of her namesake. The destroyer was commissioned into the U.S. Navy on 19 September 1913 at a total cost of $776,910.48.

== Pre-World War I service ==
After commissioning, Cummings departed Boston in November 1913 to begin operations with the Atlantic Fleet. She spent the following months conducting training exercises and fleet maneuvers along the eastern seaboard of the United States and in the Caribbean Sea. In June 1914, as tensions rose in Europe at the outbreak of World War I, Cummings was assigned to the Neutrality Patrol. She operated along the Atlantic coast monitoring maritime traffic and enforcing U.S. neutrality until the American entry into the war in April 1917.

== World War I service ==
On 12 May 1917, Cummings arrived at the New York Navy Yard for outfitting as an escort vessel. Under the command of future Admiral Henry Kent Hewitt, she sailed for Europe on 15 May, arriving at the U.S. destroyer base in Queenstown, Ireland, on 26 May. Operating under Commander, U.S. Naval Forces in European Waters, her primary missions included escorting trans-Atlantic convoys through the war zone and conducting anti-submarine patrols off the southern coast of Ireland. During her wartime service, Cummings engaged German U-boats in 14 separate encounters.

Following the Armistice of 11 November 1918, Cummings continued escort operations off the French coast. In December 1918, she formed part of the honor escort for the ocean liner George Washington, carrying President Woodrow Wilson to the Paris Peace Conference at Brest, France. The destroyer departed European waters on 16 December 1918 for her return to the United States.

== Inter-war service ==
Upon returning to the Western Hemisphere, Cummings participated in fleet exercises, including destroyer maneuvers and gunnery drills at Guántanamo Bay, Cuba, from 6–9 April 1919. She operated off Newport, Rhode Island, during July and August 1919 before entering reserve status at the Philadelphia Naval Shipyard in August 1919. She returned to active service along the U.S. East Coast from March 1921 until her decommissioning at Philadelphia on 23 June 1922.

On 7 June 1924, Cummings was transferred to the Treasury Department for service with the United States Coast Guard as part of the Rum Patrol to enforce Prohibition laws. Designated CG-3, she was commissioned into the Coast Guard on 15 May 1925. Initially based in New London, Connecticut, she was later transferred to Stapleton, New York, in 1931. Her armament was reduced to three 4-inch guns and one 1-pounder during Coast Guard service.

== Decommissioning and fate ==
Cummings was decommissioned by the Coast Guard on 30 April 1932 and returned to the Navy on 23 May 1932. Under the terms of the London Naval Treaty, she was struck from the Naval Vessel Register on 5 July 1934. Her name was officially transferred to the new destroyer USS Cummings (DD-365) on 1 July 1933. The former Cummings (DD-44) was sold for scrapping on 22 August 1934.
