= Alexander Mitchell House =

Alexander Mitchell House may refer to:

- Alexander Mitchell House (Salt Lake City, Utah), listed on the National Register of Historic Places (NRHP) in Salt Lake County
- Alexander Mitchell House (Milwaukee, Wisconsin), listed on the National Register of Historic Places in Milwaukee County
