= Cummins House =

Cummins House may refer to:

Australia

- Cummins House, Adelaide, South Australia, built 1842 for Sir John Morphett

United States

- David J. Cummins House, Smyrna, Delaware, listed on the National Register of Historic Places (NRHP) in Kent County, Delaware
- Timothy Cummins House, Smyrna, Delaware, listed on the NRHP in Kent County, Delaware
- Albert Baird Cummins House, Des Moines, Iowa, listed on the NRHP in Polk County, Iowa
- John R. Cummins Farmhouse, Eden Prairie, Minnesota, NRHP-listed
- David Cummins Octagon House, Conneaut, Ohio, NRHP-listed

== See also ==
- Cummings House (disambiguation)
