= Henry Kent Hewitt =

United States Navy officer (1887–1972)

- Admiral H. Kent Hewitt c. 1945
- Born: February 11, 1887; Hackensack, New Jersey, U.S.
- Died: September 15, 1972 (aged 85); Middlebury, Vermont, U.S.
- Burial place: United States Naval Academy Cemetery (Section 2 Lot 209)
- Military career
- Allegiance: United States
- Branch: United States Navy
- Service years: 1906–1949
- Rank: Admiral
- Commands: United States Naval Forces Europe; United States Eighth Fleet; Amphibious Force, Atlantic Fleet; Special Service Squadron; USS Indianapolis; USS Cummings; USS Eagle
- Conflicts: World War I; Battle of the Atlantic; World War II; Battle of the Atlantic; Battle of Casablanca; Battle of Gela; Battle of Salerno; Operation Dragoon
- Awards: Navy Cross (2); Navy Distinguished Service Medal (2); Army Distinguished Service Medal (2)

Henry Kent Hewitt (February 11, 1887 – September 15, 1972) was the United States Navy commander of amphibious operations in North Africa and southern Europe through World War II. He was born in Hackensack, New Jersey and graduated from the United States Naval Academy in 1907. His classmates included Patrick N. L. Bellinger, Willis W. Bradley, Robert C. Giffen, Jonas H. Ingram, George M. Courts, Claud A. Jones, and Raymond A. Spruance.

== Early career ==
Hewitt served aboard USS Missouri in the Great White Fleet's circumnavigation of the globe from 1907–1909. His sea duty continued as a division officer aboard USS Connecticut and executive officer of the destroyer USS Flusser. In 1913 he was promoted to lieutenant, married Floride Louise Hunt (1887–1973), and began three years of shore duty as a Naval Academy mathematics instructor. He returned to sea in 1916 commanding the yacht Eagle in the Caribbean. Hewitt was awarded the Navy Cross commanding the destroyer USS Cummings escorting Atlantic convoys during World War I. His citation reads:

The President of the United States of America takes pleasure in presenting the Navy Cross to Commander Henry Kent Hewitt, United States Navy, for distinguished service in the line of his profession as Commanding Officer of the U.S.S. CUMMINGS, engaged in the important, exacting and hazardous duty of patrolling the waters infested with enemy submarines and mines, in escorting and protecting vitally important convoys of troops and supplies through these waters, and in offensive and defensive action, vigorously and unremittingly prosecuted against all forms of enemy naval activity during World War I.

Hewitt was an instructor of electrical engineering and physics at the Naval Academy from 1919 to 1921 before returning to sea as gunnery officer aboard USS Pennsylvania. After spending three years at the Naval War College in Newport, Rhode Island, he commanded Destroyer Division Twelve with the battle fleet from 1931 to 1933. He then chaired the Naval Academy mathematics department for three years while the Naval Academy developed the Keuffel & Esser Log Log Trig slide rule. He returned to sea commanding the cruiser USS Indianapolis and transported President Franklin D. Roosevelt to the Pan-American Conference at Buenos Aires following the 1936 elections.

== Flag rank during World War II ==
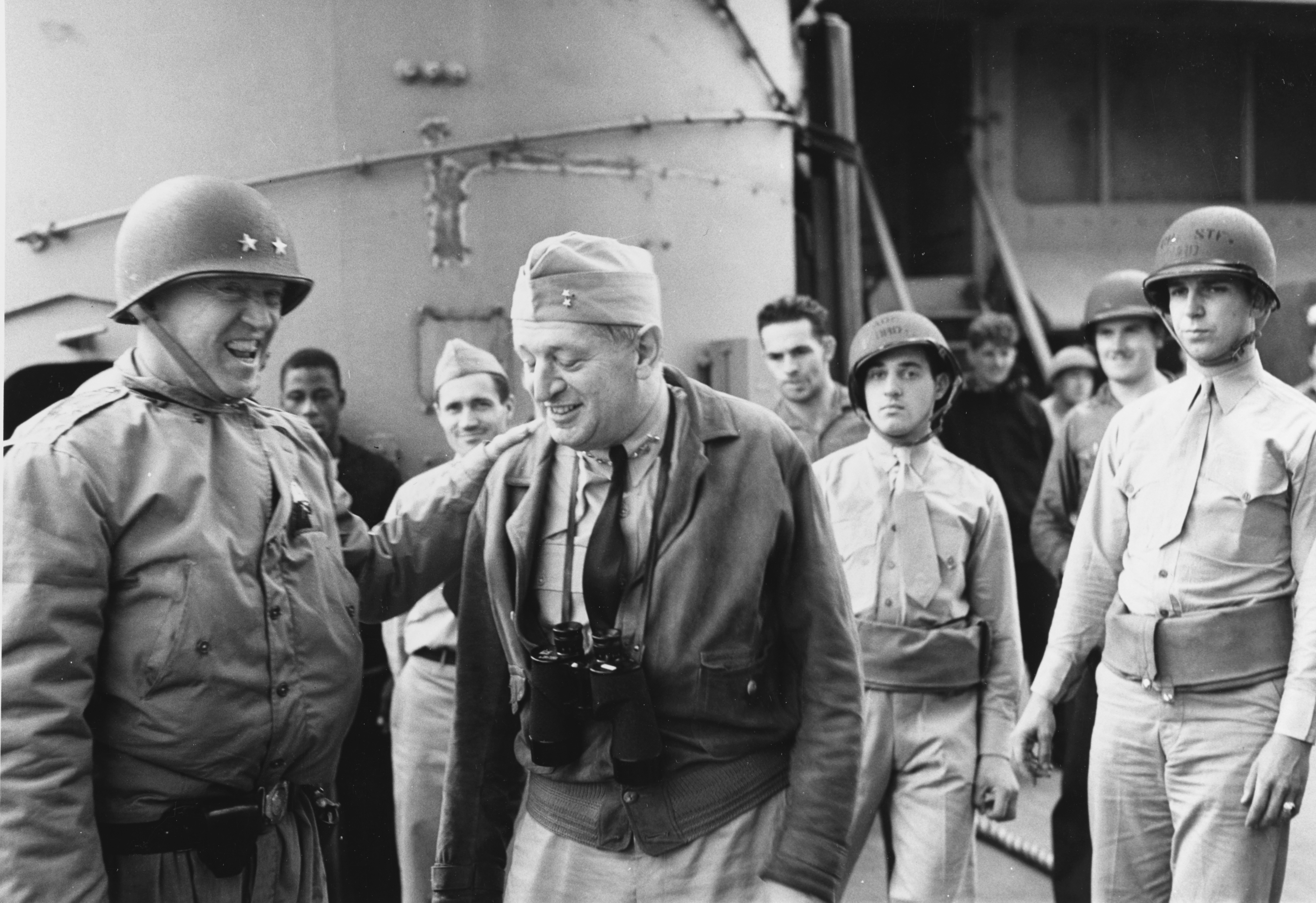
Major General George Patton with Rear Admiral Hewitt aboard USS Augusta, off the coast of North Africa, November 1942.

Hewitt was promoted to rear admiral in 1939, and commanded Atlantic Fleet Task Groups in neutrality patrols and convoys from 1941 until becoming Commander, Amphibious Force, Atlantic Fleet, in April 1942. This force, also called Task Force 34, became the U.S. component of the Operation Torch landings in November 1942. Hewitt was then assigned as Commander, U.S. Naval Forces, Northwest Africa Waters or COMNAVNAW. His flagships included USS Augusta while he commanded American naval forces at the Naval Battle of Casablanca, Monrovia while he commanded the western task force during the invasion of Sicily, and Ancon while he commanded all Allied amphibious forces during the invasion of Italy and later Anzio landings and invasion of southern France.

Hewitt was awarded both the Army and Navy Distinguished Service Medals for his part in the invasion of North Africa. The Navy Distinguished Service Medal citation reads:

The President of the United States of America, authorized by Act of Congress, July 9, 1918, takes pleasure in presenting the Navy Distinguished Service Medal to Rear Admiral Henry Kent Hewitt (NSN: 0–5819), United States Navy, for exceptionally meritorious and distinguished services to the Government of the United States, in a duty of great responsibility, as Commander of the United States Naval Forces which escorted and supported the United States Army Forces in successful landings and occupation of certain objectives in French Morocco from 7 November 1942 to 15 November 1942. By his careful and exhaustive planning and his able and efficient conduct of escort and coverage of United States Army landing forces, Rear Admiral Hewitt contributed greatly to the successful accomplishment of one of three major objectives in the occupation of North Africa.

The Army Distinguished Service Medal citation reads:

The President of the United States of America, authorized by Act of Congress, July 9, 1918, takes pleasure in presenting the Army Distinguished Service Medal to Rear Admiral Henry Kent Hewitt (NSN: 0–5819), United States Navy, for exceptionally meritorious and distinguished services to the Government of the United States, in a duty of great responsibility. Admiral Hewitt, in his capacity as Commander of the Amphibious Force Atlantic Fleet, and of Naval Task Force No. THIRTY-FOUR (34), with the highest type of skill and leadership, conducted his large fleet from the United States to the shores of French Morocco, through waters infested with hostile submarines, without loss. Through his care, foresight, and leadership, the forces he transported were landed 8 November 1942 on a hostile and unknown shore, during hours of darkness, in a heavy sea, at the proper time and places. In subsequent tactical action he handled his forces so as to prevent interference by hostile naval units with the landing of our forces as planned. His services contributed in marked degree to the success of the enterprise.

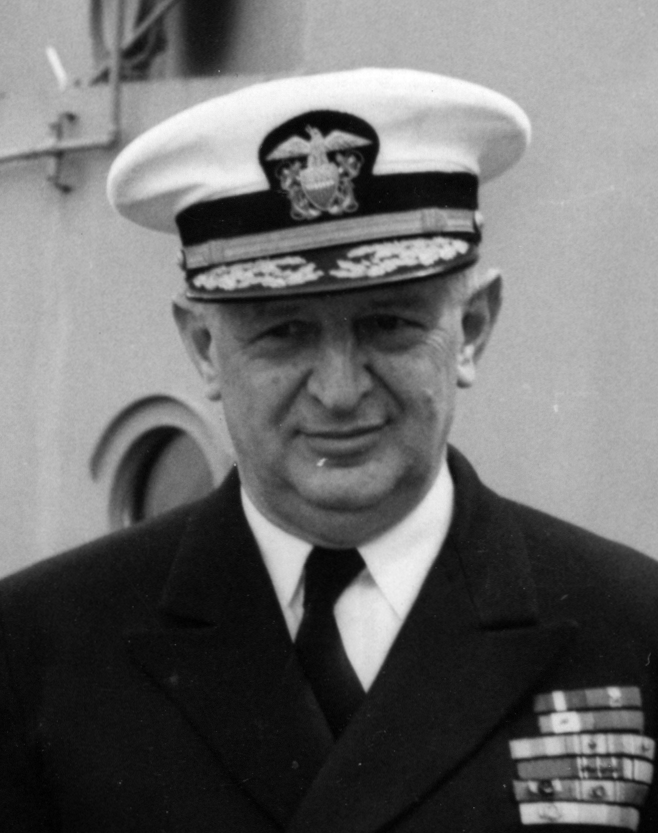
Henry Kent Hewitt, photographed while USS Missouri was visiting Piraeus, Greece, circa 10–14 April 1946.

Hewitt was awarded a second Navy Cross for his part in the invasion of Italy. The citation reads:

The President of the United States of America, authorized by Act of Congress, July 9, 1918, takes pleasure in presenting a Gold Star in lieu of a Second Award of the Navy Cross to Admiral [then Vice Admiral] Henry Kent Hewitt (NSN: 0–5819), United States Navy, for extraordinary heroism and distinguished service in the line of his profession as Commander, Western Naval Task Force, in action against enemy German forces during the invasion of Salerno, in September 1943. In command of more than 600 Allied Men-O'-War, ships and large landing craft responsible for the safe sea borne movements of the Allied FIFTH Army to the Gulf of Salerno, Admiral Hewitt brought them skillfully through mined approach courses and developed a sea frontier length of approximately fifty miles despite limited maneuvering space. As the second wave of our landing boats reached the shore, strong German armored elements, deployed along selected beaches, launched heavy counterattacks. They raked the sands where our troops were trying to dig in, tanks rolled out of the valley and charged; hostile artillery continually shelled ships in the anchorage; enemy air forces attacked with high and low-level bombings, dive-bombing and strafing, and with radio-controlled and rocket-glider bombs. The entire operation was in jeopardy. Aware of the narrow margin of success, Admiral Hewitt went ashore. He made a personal reconnaissance of the situation and learned of the peril in flat coastal plains where Allied formations were enveloped in two small detached areas pounded by artillery fire from rugged high ground inland, and requested immediate air and sea reinforcements. With his Flagship marked for destruction by the German Command and pursued as a vital target, he shifted his Flag to a less important unit. His long-range Naval guns blasted enemy formations without respite. German penetration was sealed off and rendered an immobile target for heavy strikes by Allied bombers, thus insuring the success of the Salerno Campaign. By his courage, initiative and inspiring leadership under fire, Admiral Hewitt upheld the finest traditions of the United States Naval Service.

Hewitt was awarded a second Army Distinguished Service Medal for his part in the invasion of southern France. The citation reads:

The President of the United States of America, authorized by Act of Congress, July 9, 1918, takes pleasure in presenting a Bronze Oak Leaf Cluster in lieu of a Second Award of the Army Distinguished Service Medal to Vice Admiral Henry Kent Hewitt (NSN: 0–5819), United States Navy, for exceptionally meritorious and distinguished services to the Government of the United States, in a duty of great responsibility. As Naval Commander, Western Naval Task Force, from 13 August to 27 September 1944, Admiral Hewitt was responsible for all Naval activities in connection with the invasion of southern France. Displaying great technical skill, efficiency and a broad knowledge of the tremendous task entrusted to him, he coordinated all Naval activities of both United States and Allied Forces involved in the operation. His wide professional experience, sound judgment and energy were of the greatest service in executing combined operations. His forces engaged in amphibious offensive operations with marked effectiveness and made an invaluable contribution to the success of the invasion of southern France. His initiative and tact enlisted the enthusiastic cooperation of all forces under his command.

Hewitt was awarded a second Navy Distinguished Service Medal as commander of the United States Eighth Fleet for the last two years of the war. The citation reads:

The President of the United States of America, authorized by Act of Congress, July 9, 1918, takes pleasure in presenting a Gold Star in lieu of a Second Award of the Navy Distinguished Service Medal to Vice Admiral Henry Kent Hewitt (NSN: 0–5819), United States Navy, for exceptionally meritorious and distinguished services to the Government of the United States, in a duty of great responsibility as Commander of the EIGHTH Fleet during the period from 1943 to 1945. Operating jointly with the forces of the United States Army, the forces under Vice Admiral Hewitt's command executed a successful landing on hostile shores. The meticulous planning and sound tactical knowledge which were essential to the accomplishment of a particularly strategic mission reflect great credit upon Vice Admiral Hewitt and the United States Naval Service.

== Post-war ==
Hewitt remained in this post until 1945, when he chaired a Pearl Harbor investigation. Following World War II, he commanded U.S. Naval Forces Europe, advised the Naval War College, and served as a Navy representative to the United Nations. Hewitt retired from active duty to Orwell, Vermont in 1949. and died at Middlebury, Vermont in 1972. USS Hewitt was named in his honor.

== Personal life ==
His paternal grandfather was a brother of Abram Hewitt, the ironmaking industrialist and former mayor of New York City. He was therefore a first cousin of Eleanor Margaret Green, Princess Viggo of Denmark, a connection noted when Hewitt visited Denmark during a post-Second World War victory tour.

Hewitt was married to the former Floride Hunt until his death. They had two daughters.

== Honors and awards ==
Navy Cross with one gold award star
Navy Distinguished Service Medal with one gold award star
Army Distinguished Service Medal with one oak leaf cluster
Navy Expeditionary Medal
Dominican Campaign Medal
World War I Victory Medal with one bronze service star
American Defense Service Medal with Atlantic "A" device
American Campaign Medal
European-African-Middle Eastern Campaign Medal with four bronze service stars
World War II Victory Medal
Knight Commander of the Order of the Bath (United Kingdom)
Legion of Honor, rank of Grand Officer (France)
Croix de Guerre, 1939–45 with one bronze Palm device (France)
Order of the Southern Cross, degree of Commander (Brazil)
Grand Cross of the Order of Orange-Nassau (Netherlands)
Order of Kutuzov (1st class) (Soviet Union)

There is a display of Admiral Hewitt's orders, decorations and medals at the United States Naval War College Museum in Newport, Rhode Island.
