= USS Hewitt =

Spruance-class destroyer

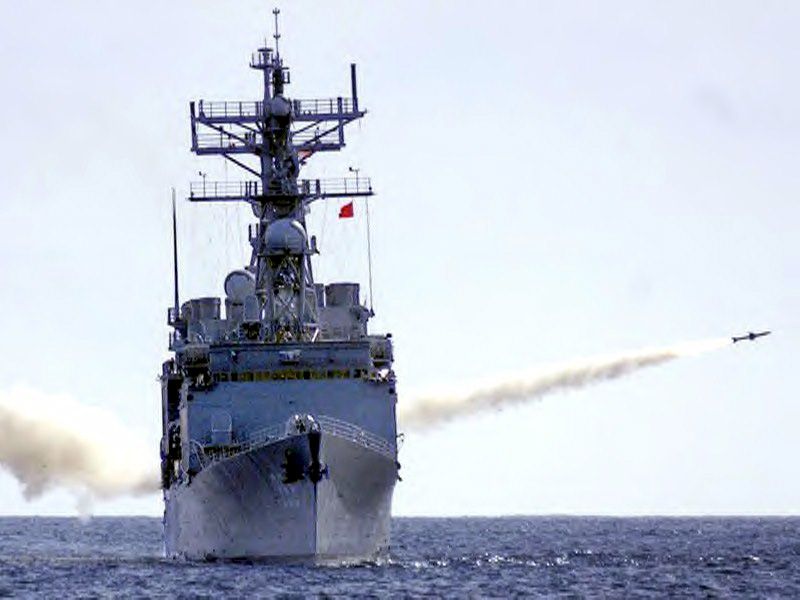
- USS Hewitt fires a Sea Sparrow on 23 March 2000

History

United States
- Name: Hewitt
- Namesake: H. Kent Hewitt
- Ordered: 1 January 1971
- Builder: Ingalls Shipbuilding
- Laid down: 23 July 1973
- Launched: 24 August 1974
- Acquired: 1 September 1976
- Commissioned: 25 September 1976
- Decommissioned: 19 July 2001
- Stricken: 5 June 2002
- Identification: Callsign: NDDW; Hull number: DDG-966
- Motto: Be Just and Fear Not
- Fate: Scrapped, 9 August 2001
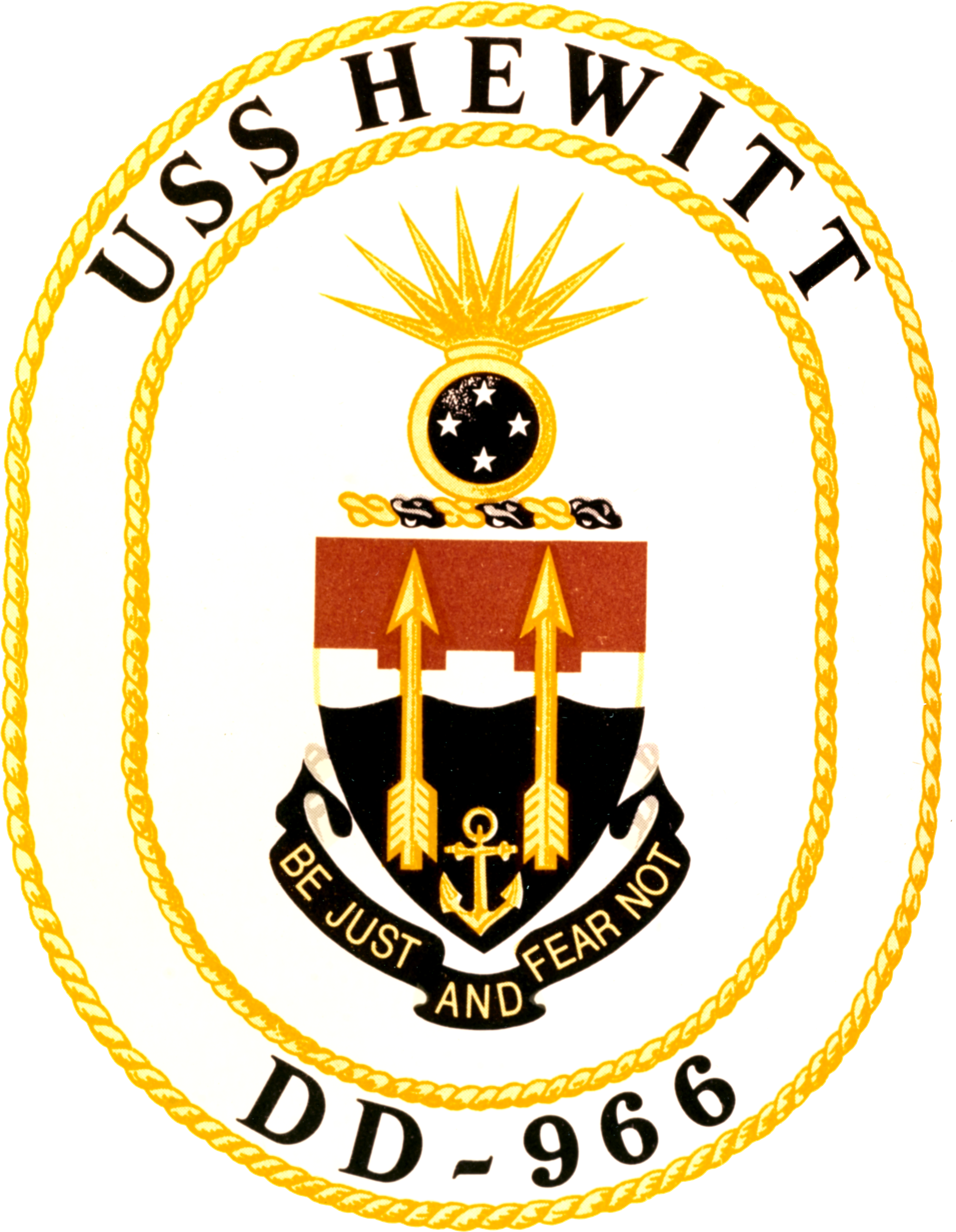
- Badge

General characteristics
- Class & type: Spruance-class destroyer
- Displacement: 8,040 long tons (8,170 t) full load
- Length: 529 ft (161 m) waterline; 563 ft (172 m) overall
- Beam: 55 ft (17 m)
- Draft: 29 ft (8.8 m)
- Installed power: 3 × 501-K17 generator sets (2,000 kW (2,700 hp) each)
- Propulsion: 4 × General Electric LM2500 gas turbines, 2 shafts, 80,000 shp (60 MW)
- Speed: 32.5 knots (60.2 km/h; 37.4 mph)
- Range: 6,000 nmi (11,000 km; 6,900 mi) at 20 knots (37 km/h; 23 mph)
- Complement: 19 officers, 315 enlisted
- Sensors & processing systems: AN/SPS-40 air search radar; AN/SPG-60 fire control radar; AN/SPS-55 surface search radar; AN/SPQ-9 gun fire control radar; Mark 23 TAS automatic detection and tracking radar; AN/SPS-65 missile fire control radar; AN/SQS-53 bow-mounted active sonar; AN/SQR-19 TACTAS towed array passive sonar; Naval Tactical Data System
- Electronic warfare & decoys: AN/SLQ-32 electronic warfare system; AN/SLQ-25 Nixie torpedo countermeasures; Mark 36 SRBOC decoy launching system; AN/SLQ-49 inflatable decoys
- Armament: 2 × 5 in (127 mm) 54 caliber Mark 45 dual purpose guns; 2 × 20 mm Phalanx CIWS Mark 15 guns; 1 × 8 cell ASROC launcher (removed); 1 × 8 cell NATO Sea Sparrow Mark 29 missile launcher; 2 × quadruple Harpoon missile canisters; 2 × Mark 32 triple 12.75 in (324 mm) torpedo tubes (Mk 46 torpedoes); 1 × 61 cell Mk 41 VLS launcher for Tomahawk missiles
- Aircraft carried: 2 × Sikorsky SH-60 Seahawk LAMPS III helicopters
- Aviation facilities: Flight deck and enclosed hangar for up to two medium-lift helicopters

USS Hewitt (DD-966), named for Admiral H. Kent Hewitt USN (1887–1972), was a Spruance-class destroyer built by the Ingalls Shipbuilding Division of Litton Industries at Pascagoula, Mississippi and launched on 14 September 1974 by Mrs. Leroy Hewitt Taylor and Mrs. Gerald Hewitt Norton, daughters of Admiral Hewitt.

== History ==
Hewitt was the fourth of the Spruance-class destroyers. Known as the "Greyhounds of the fleet" for their speed, versatility and reliability, they were the largest general purpose destroyers ever to fly the flag of the United States.

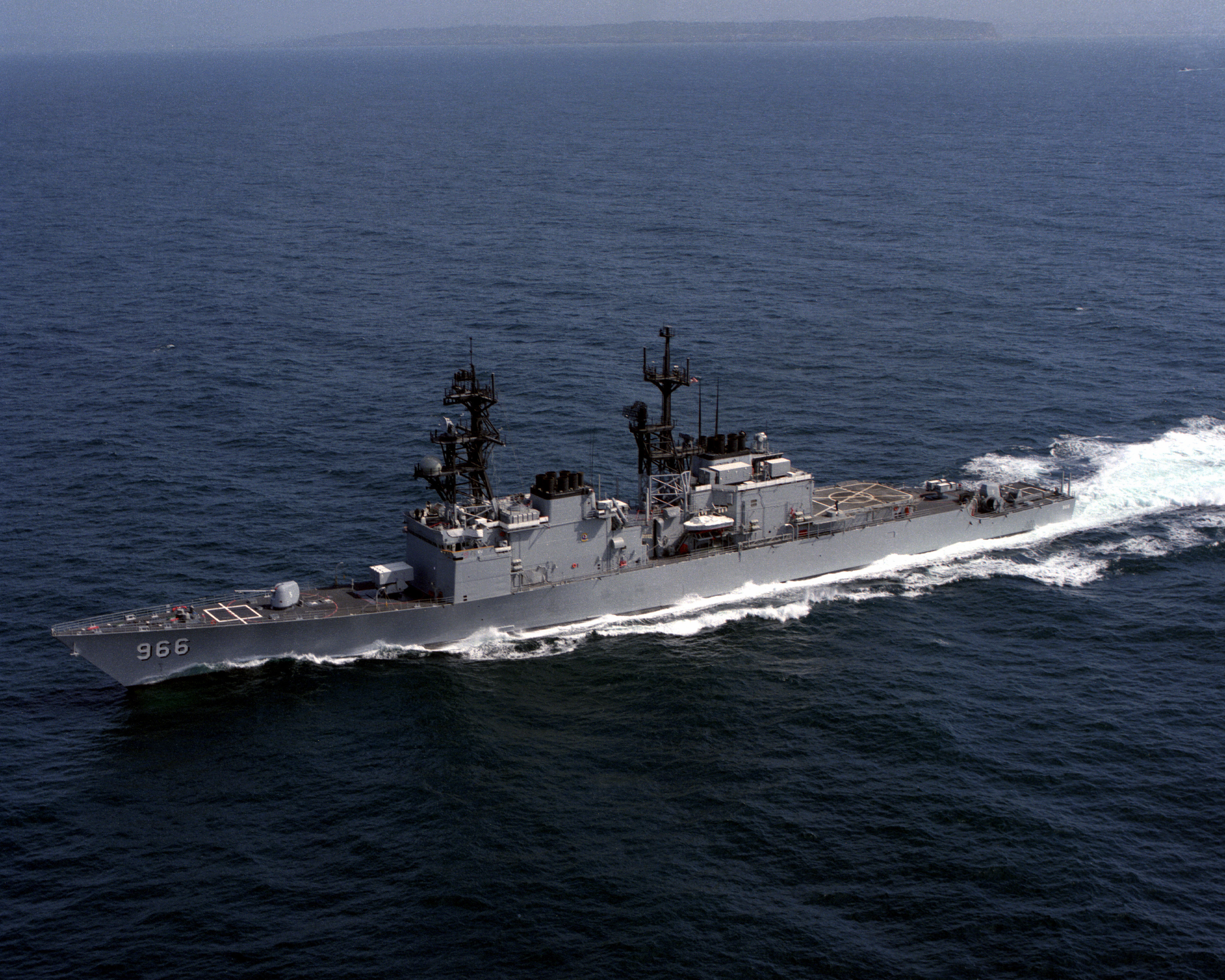
Hewitt, 1986.

Hewitt was commissioned on 25 September 1976. After an intensive period of initial training, Hewitt deployed to the Western Pacific in September 1978 and was assigned to the U.S. 7th Fleet. In addition to serving as a front line unit, Hewitt also acted as a good will ambassador with port visits to Australia, New Zealand, Fiji and Hong Kong. Hewitt returned to San Diego in April 1979. In preparation for her next deployment, Hewitt participated in a multinational Rim-of-the-Pacific (RIMPAC) battle group exercise in February and March 1980.

She departed on her second overseas deployment on 15 May 1980. During that deployment, Hewitt and other members of Battle Group Charlie operated in the Indian Ocean to show U.S. resolve to protect free world access to Middle East petroleum resources, and to help obtain the release of 52 Americans held hostage in Iran. Hewitt earned the Navy Expeditionary Medal for her contributions. During the latter part of the deployment, Hewitt also earned the Humanitarian Service Medal for rescuing a group of Vietnamese boat refugees adrift in the South China Sea. For her superior performance, Hewitt was awarded the Battle "E" as the most outstanding ship in Destroyer Squadron 21 (DesRon 21) from 1979 to 1980.

Hewitt entered the Long Beach Naval Shipyard on 19 May 1981 for its first regular overhaul. Extensive modifications were performed to improve survivability, and new combat systems capabilities were added to improve quick reaction to missile attacks. After a rigorous re-qualification and retraining period, Hewitt departed on 21 March 1983 for its third deployment. Highlights included a three aircraft carrier fleet exercise with Midway, Coral Sea and Carl Vinson, and independent operations in the South China Sea.

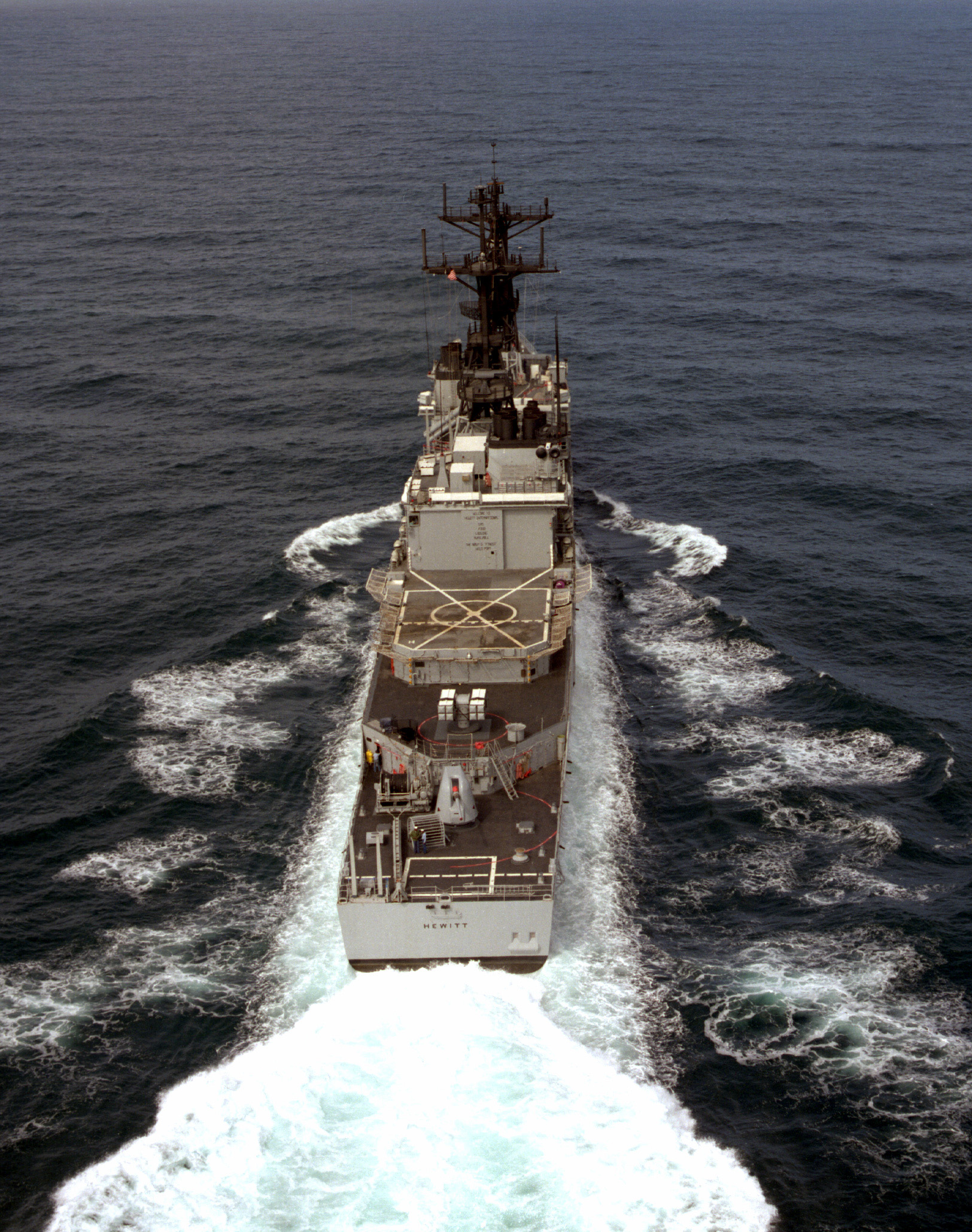
Hewitt c.1986.

Hewitt departed on her fourth deployment on 18 October 1984. Once again a member of Battle Group Charlie, she spent seven highly successful months in the Western Pacific and Indian Oceans. In January 1985, Hewitt set a record at the Tabones Firing Range in the Philippines by earning the highest score ever recorded at the range for Naval Gunfire Support (NGFS) exercise. From February to April 1985, Hewitt operated in the North Arabian Sea and Gulf of Oman. For its achievements during the deployment, Hewitt received the Meritorious Unit Commendation. Hewitt returned home to San Diego on 24 May 1985.

On 1 September 1985, Hewitt and other members of Destroyer Squadron 31 became the first Pacific Fleet Anti-Submarine Warfare Squadron. The squadron's basic mission was to locate and track submarines in the Eastern Pacific, to develop USW tactics and training, and to serve as a ready response force under Commander, U.S. 3rd Fleet. From September 1985 to April 1987, Hewitt and the other ships in DesRon 31 set new standards of excellence in USW.

During Hewitt's second overhaul (May 1987 to November 1988) at National Steel and Shipbuilding Company Shipyard in San Diego, California, she underwent a modernization which included installation of the Vertical Launch System, the Tomahawk Missile System, the Close-In Weapons System (CIWS), LAMPS MK III, and the SQQ-89 Sonar System. After a brief but extensive training and inspection cycle, Hewitt joined DesRon 21 and once again deployed to the Persian Gulf on 18 September 1989. Hewitt's fifth Western Pacific deployment ended on 16 March 1990. Five months later, Hewitt was underway to her new homeport at Yokosuka, Japan.

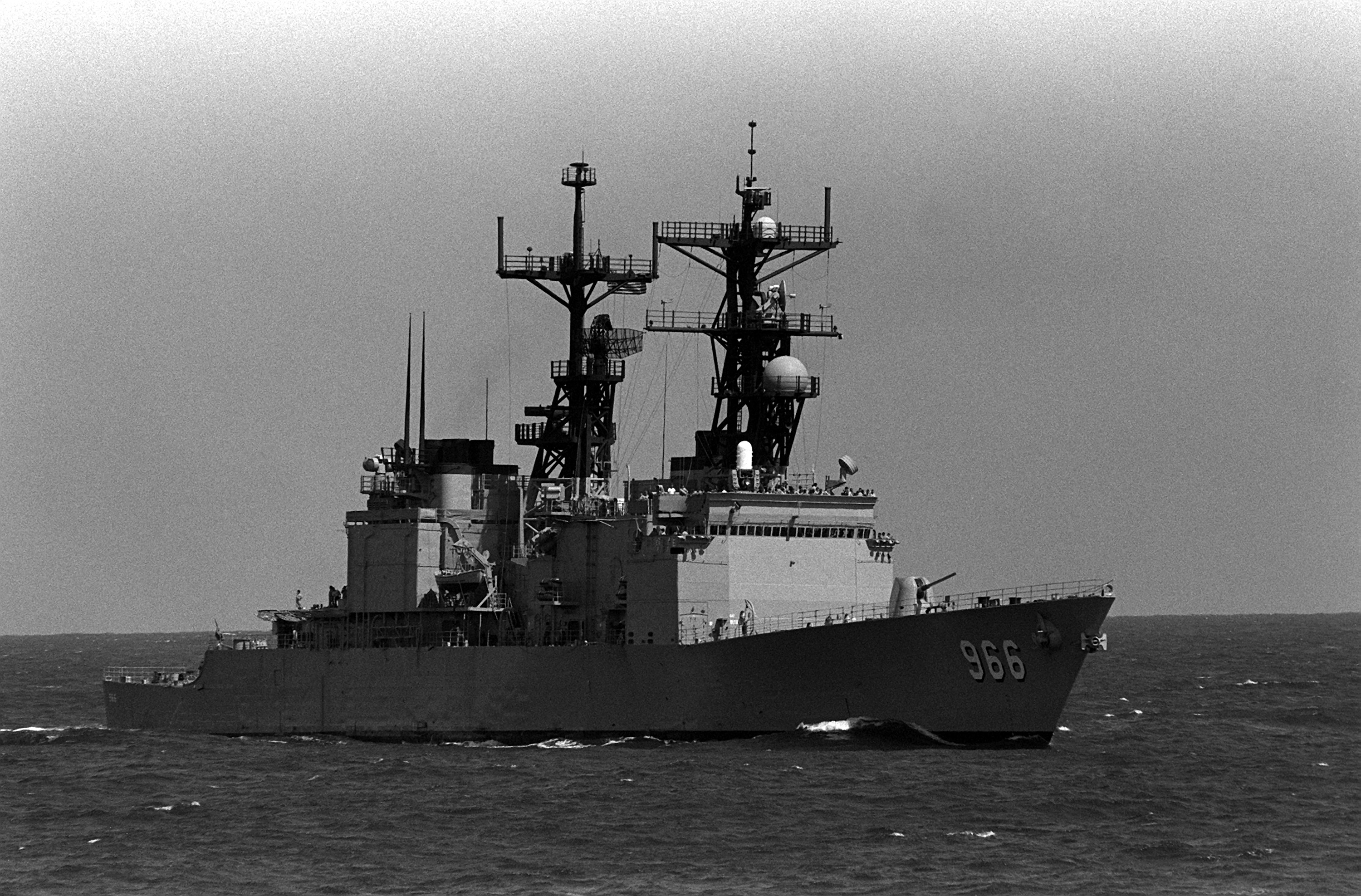
Hewitt during FLEETEX '89.

Hewitt joined Destroyer Squadron 15 on 25 August 1990. In Yokosuka, she operated with numerous multi-national forces, including the Japanese Maritime Self-Defense Force, and the South Korean, Bruneian, Greek, French, Spanish, Australian, Saudi Arabian, Russian, British, and Singaporean navies. Hewitt participated as flagship for Maritime Interception Force (MIF) Commander Red Sea for Boarding Operations in support of Operation Desert Storm in 1991 as part of United Nations sanctions against Iraq. Hewitt concluded an intensive six-month deployment to the Persian Gulf in April 1993. Her seventh deployment was highlighted by a Tomahawk strike against Iraq and combined operations with numerous navies, the Russian destroyer Admiral Tributs. Hewitt also served as Maritime Action Group (MAG) Commander in October 1993, helping to develop the new MAG warfare concept. Hewitt was awarded the Meritorious Unit Commendation for the 1992–1993 Persian Gulf deployment and the U.S. 7th Fleet's USW Excellence Award for 1993.

Following a brief maintenance availability in early 1994. Hewitt participated in RIMPAC '94. Directly following the exercise, Hewitt conducted live missile firings near Barking Sands, Kauai, Hawaii which included a successful NATO Sea Sparrow engagement and the first fleet firing of the Penguin anti-ship missile with HSL 51 Detachment 6 on 25 June 1994. Hewitt again deployed to the Persian Gulf on 5 September 1994 as a primary component of the multinational Middle East peacekeeping unit, enforcing United Nations sanctions against Iraq. Hewitt returned to Yokosuka, Japan 10 January 1995 and received U.S. 7th Fleet's Surface Warfare Award for 1994.

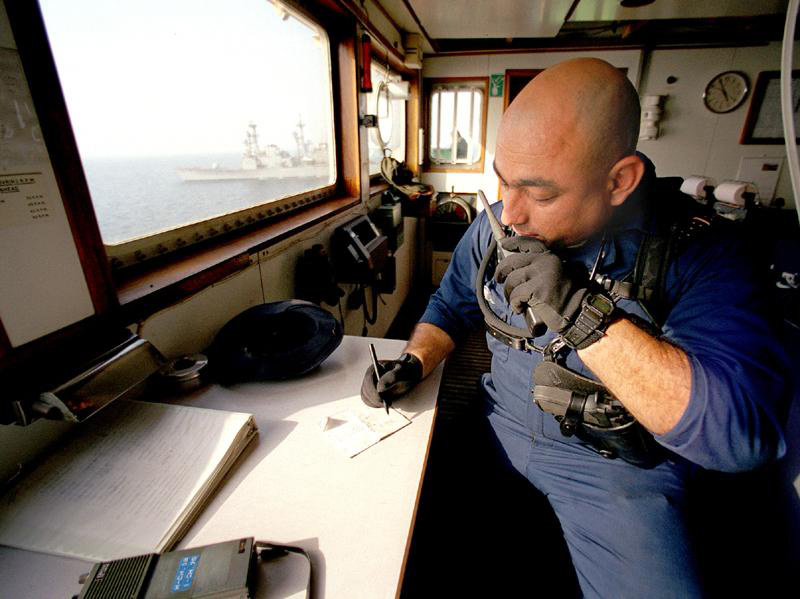
Hewitt waits in the background while a boarding team member stands on the bridge of the merchant ship Ibn Abdoon.

On 17 March 1995, Hewitt entered the yards for an extended availability period which ended 5 September 1995. Afterwards, Hewitt participated in several multinational USW exercises and was awarded the Battle "E" for her performance in 1995. On 3 June 1996, Hewitt deployed to the Persian Gulf for Middle East Force deployment (MEF) 96–2. While supporting U.S. 5th Fleet operations, Hewitt participated in Operation Desert Strike and launched two Tomahawk missiles on 4 September 1996 against Iraq. Hewitt received a Meritorious Unit Commendation for her actions during the deployment and returned home to Yokosuka, Japan on 30 October 1996.

In March 1997, Hewitt conducted battle group exercises with Independence and in April Destroyer Squadron 15 for the Sharem 120B exercise in the Yellow Sea conducted with the Republic of Korea Navy. In May Hewitt entered an availability and received the women at-sea modification to berth the first females permanently assigned to the ship. The first female Sailors reported on board in July. On 24 August 1997, Hewitt departed Yokosuka, Japan for a homeport change to NS San Diego, California. Hewitt joined Destroyer Squadron 23 on 29 August 1997 during her transit to San Diego.

On 27 January 1999, Hewitt deployed to the Persian Gulf for Middle East Force Deployment (MEF) 99–1. In support of U.N. Sanctions against Iraq. Hewitt conducted visit, board, search and seizure of merchants in the area. Hewitt returned to San Diego on 26 July 1999 followed by a two-month Selected Restricted Availability which ended 7 November 1999.

Hewitt was decommissioned 19 July 2001; she was sold for scrap to International Shipbreaking, Incorporated, of Brownsville, Texas on 9 August 2001. She was stricken from the Naval Vessel Register 5 June 2002.

== Awards ==
- Navy Meritorious Unit Commendation – (Nov 1984-May 1985, Sep 1985-Dec 1986, Aug-Dec 1994, Dec 2000-Mar 2001)
- Battle "E" – (1979, 1987, 1995)
- Navy Expeditionary Medal – (Jun-Aug 1980)
- National Defense Service Medal (1990)
- Southwest Asia Service Medal – (In support of Desert Storm and MIF Red Sea Ops Jun-Sep 1991 with bronze star; and Persian Gulf Sep -Dec 1994)
- Humanitarian Service Medal – (3 September 1980)
- Sea Service Deployment Ribbon (multiple)
- Kuwait Liberation Medal (Kuwait) (1991)
- Communications Green C/E Command and Control Excellence Award [Signalman and Communications Departments] (Consecutive: 1991, 1992, 1993, 1994 and 1995).

== Gallery ==
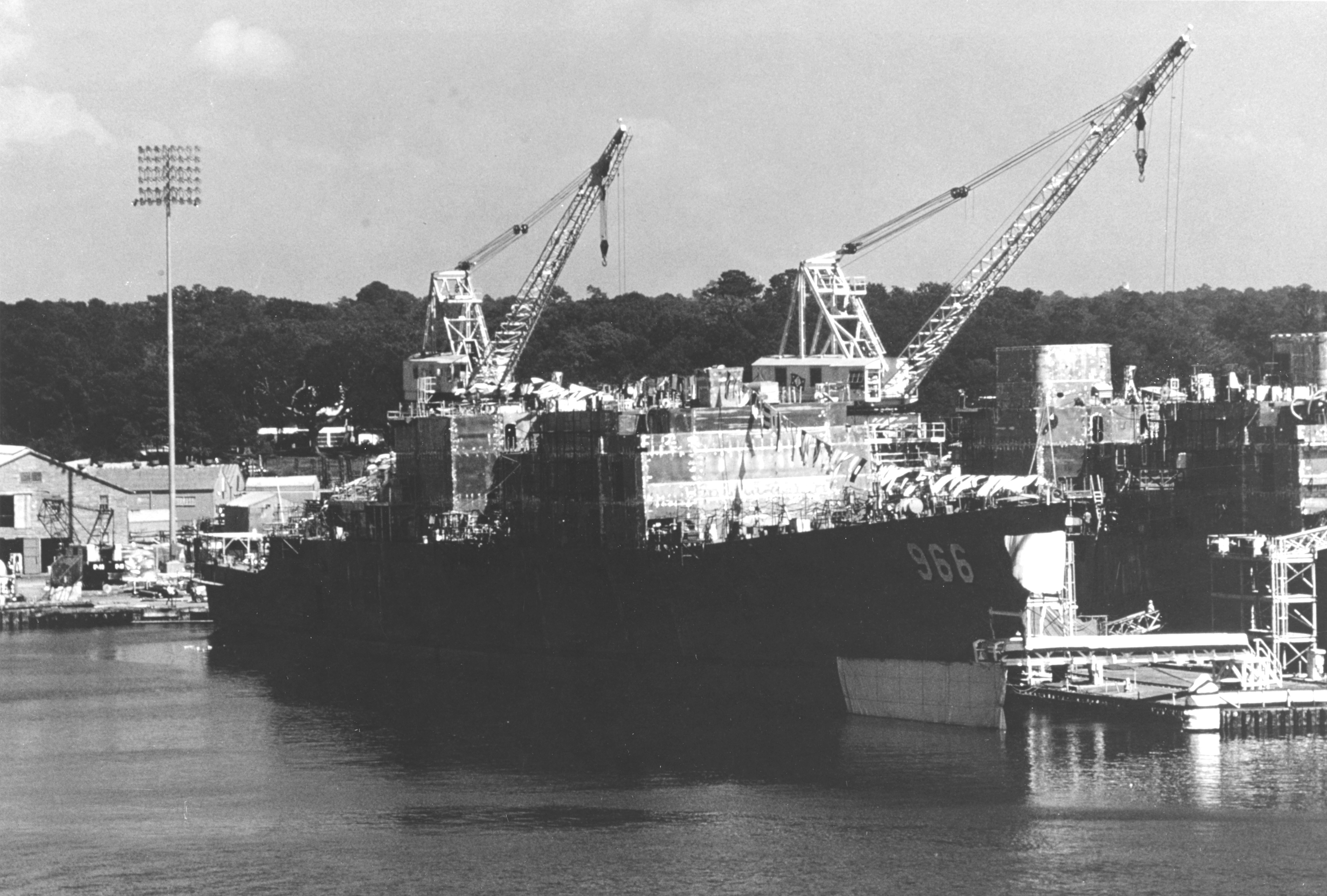
USS Hewitt under construction in September 1974

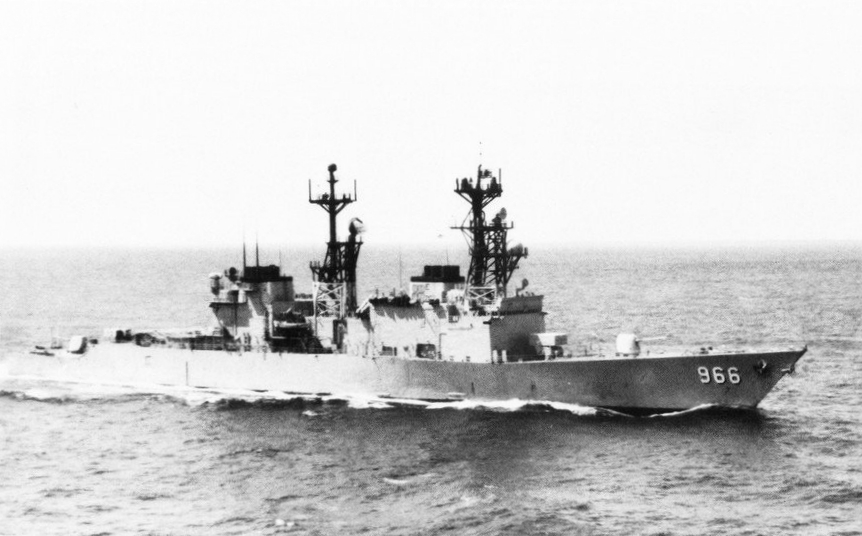
USS Hewitt in 1980

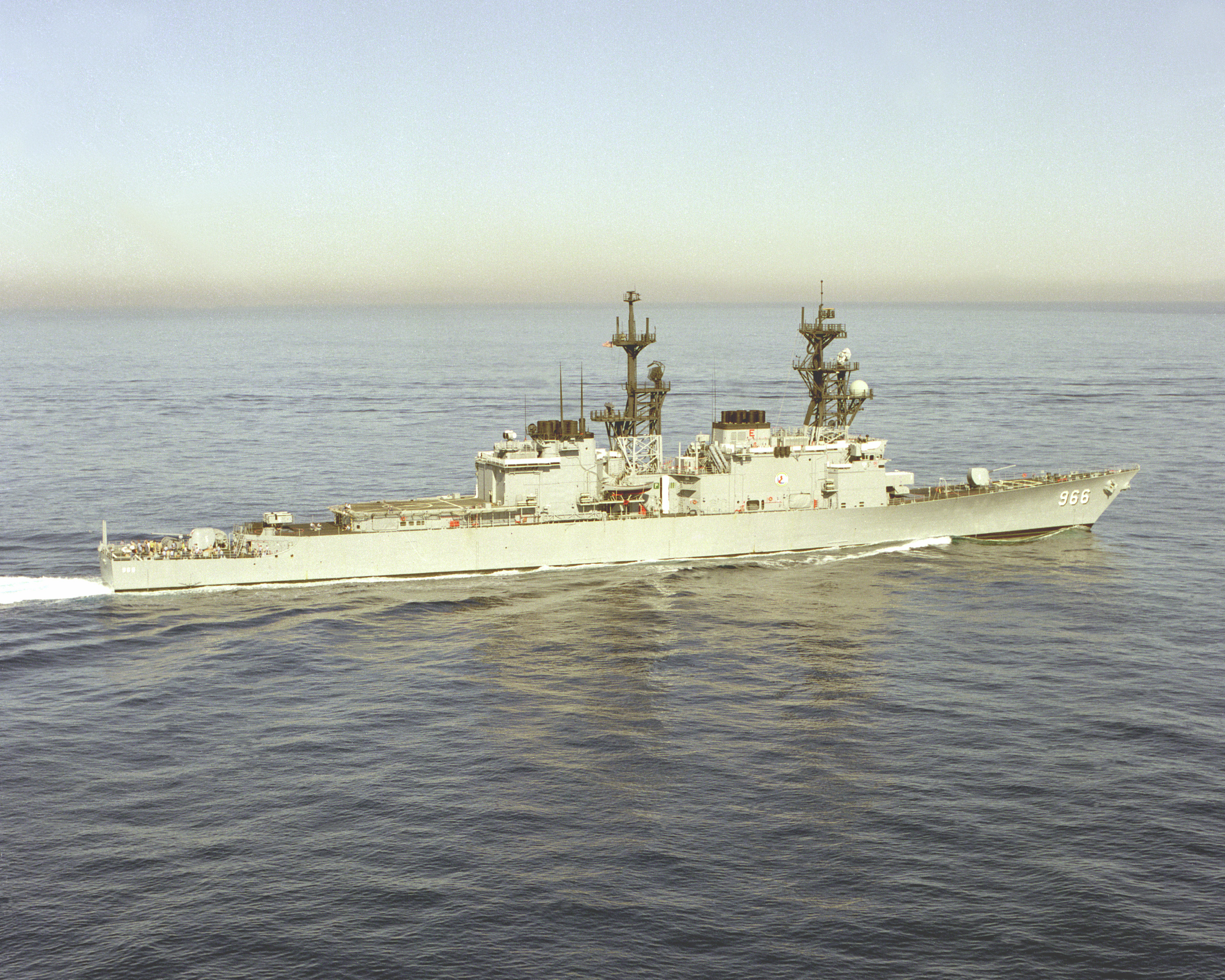
USS Hewitt off San Diego 1981

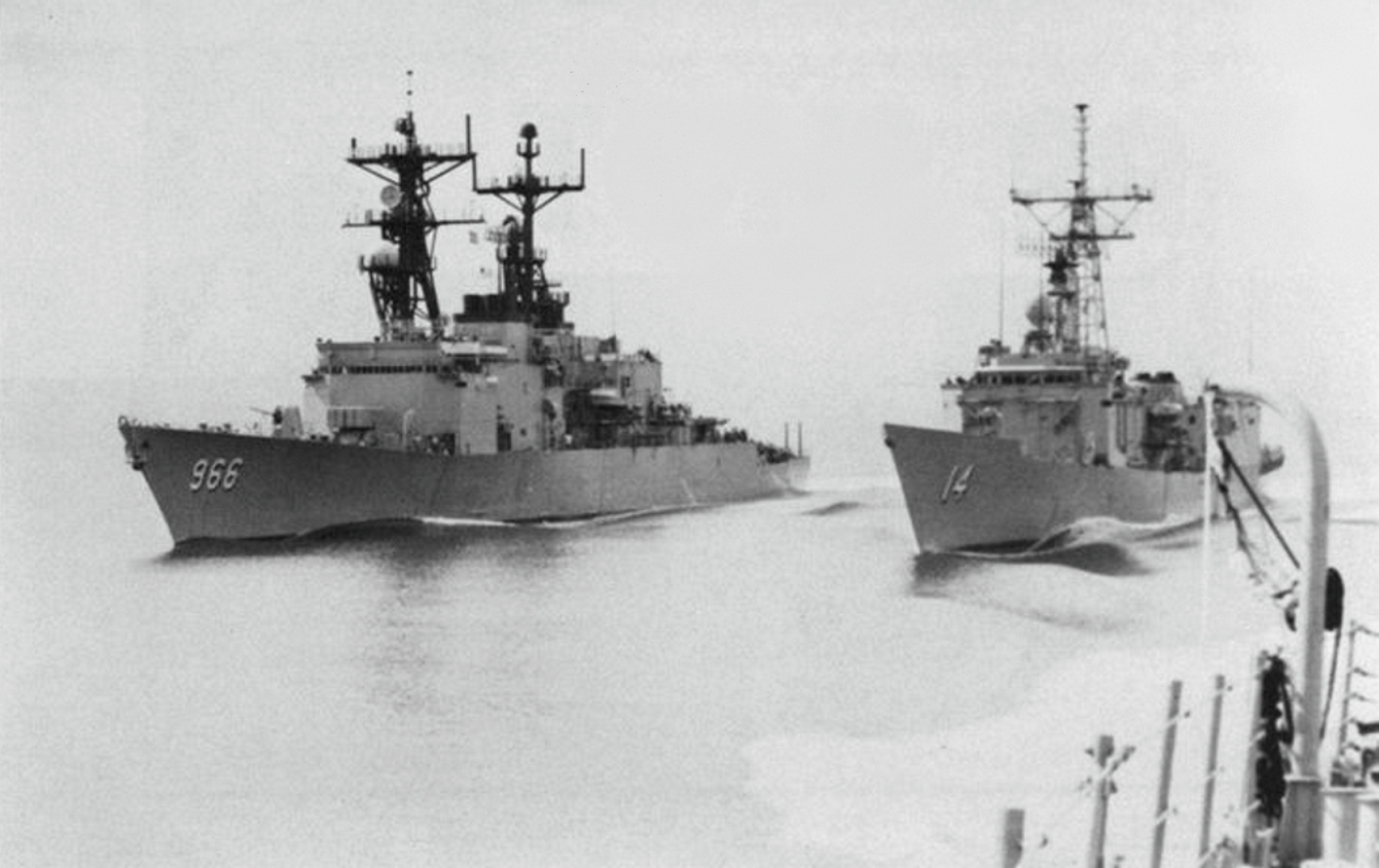
USS Hewitt alongside USS Sides in 1984

== See also ==
- List of United States Navy destroyers

== Bibliography ==
- Friedman, Norman (1995). "United Kingdom". In Chumbley, Stephen (ed.). Conway's All The World's Fighting Ships 1947–1995. Annapolis, Maryland: Naval Institute Press. pp. 544–634. ISBN 1-55750-132-7.
