= Flying Cloud Airport =

- FAA airport diagram
- IATA: FCM; ICAO: KFCM; FAA LID: FCM

Summary
- Airport type: Public
- Owner: Metropolitan Airports Commission
- Operator: Metropolitan Airports Commission
- Serves: Minneapolis–Saint Paul
- Location: Eden Prairie, Minnesota
- Elevation AMSL: 906 ft (276 m)
- Coordinates: 44°49′38″N 93°27′26″W

Map
- Location of airport in Minnesota / United States FCM (the United States)

Runways
| Direction | Length | | Surface |
| Direction | ft | m | Surface |
|---|---|---|---|
| 10R/28L | 5,001 | 1,524 | Asphalt |
| 10L/28R | 3,901 | 1,189 | Asphalt |
| 18/36 | 2,690 | 820 | Asphalt |

Statistics (2022)
- Aircraft operations: 122,281
- Based aircraft: 324
- Source: Federal Aviation Administration

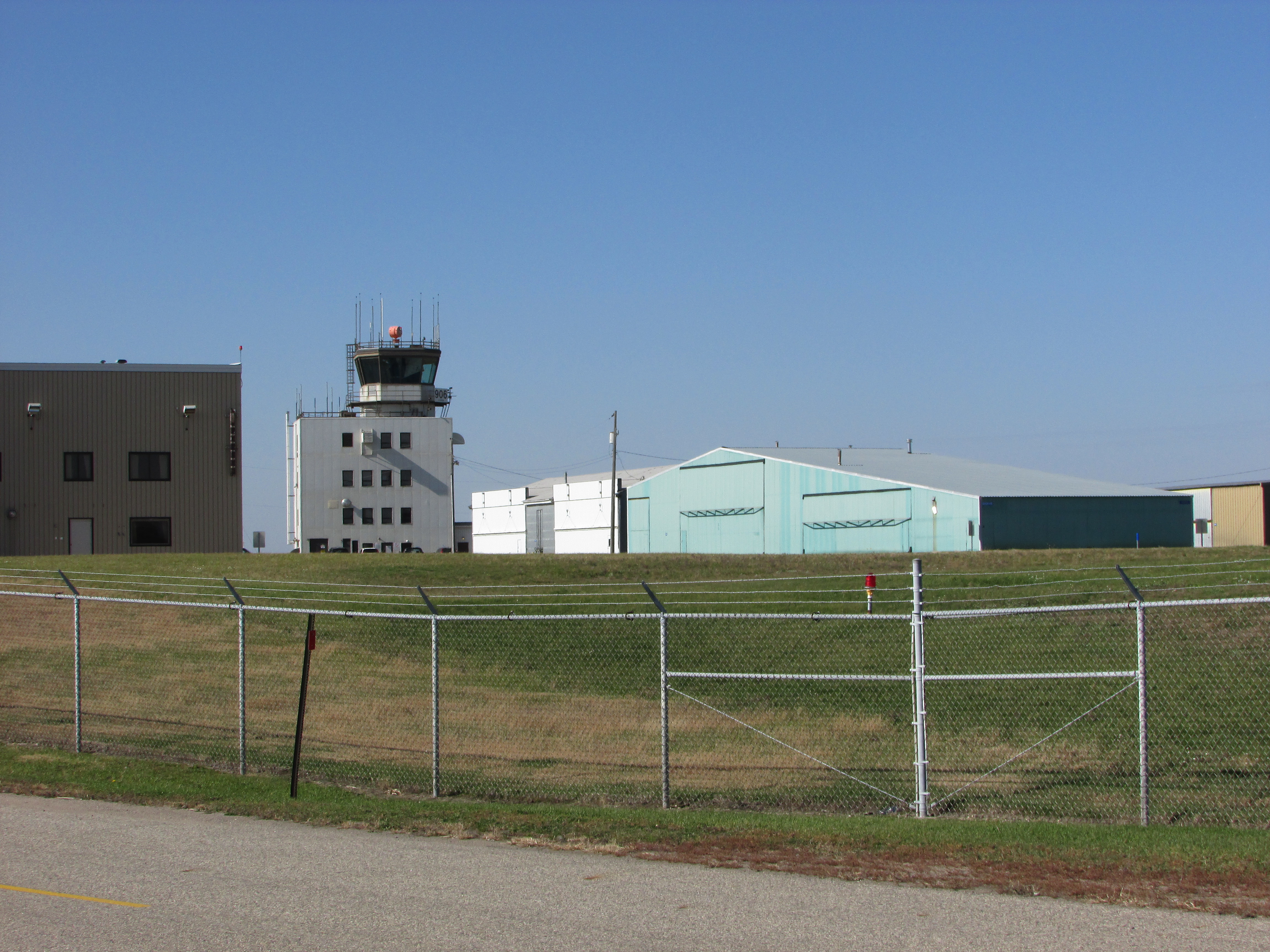
Control tower at Flying Cloud Airport

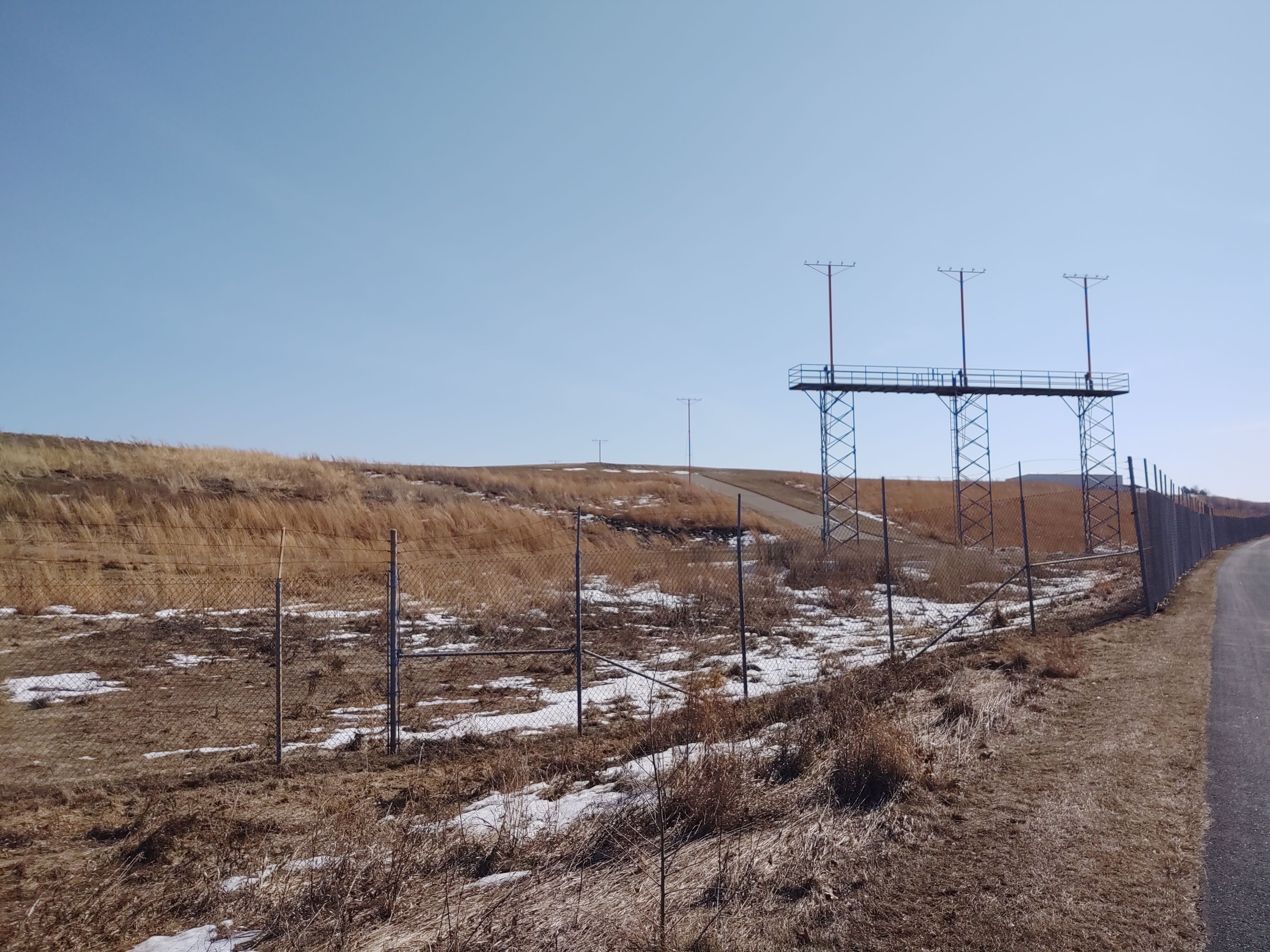
ALS for runway 10R, looking east

Flying Cloud Airport (IATA: FCM, ICAO: KFCM, FAA LID: FCM) is a public airport located in the city of Eden Prairie in Hennepin County, Minnesota, United States, about 11 miles (18 km) southwest of the central business district (CBD) of Minneapolis.

== History ==
The airport was created in 1941 when the United States Navy was training pilots for World War II. The Navy made arrangements with a local farmer, Martin "Pappy" Grill, to use a grass landing strip. Pilots flying from Wold-Chamberlain Field, now Minneapolis-St. Paul International Airport, would use this field for practicing approaches. After the war, Grill sold the field and some adjoining land to American Aviation, Inc. John Stuber named the field "Flying Cloud Airport" to reflect local Indian lore and flying. The Metropolitan Airports Commission bought the airport in 1948 and paved the runway. The MAC built a control tower in 1963. By 1966, it was ranked the second-busiest airport in the central United States, behind Chicago-O'Hare International Airport. In 1968, with 446,198 takeoffs and landings, it was the ninth-busiest airport in the United States. Today it is designated by the FAA as a reliever airport and aircraft are restricted to 60,000 pounds (27 t) or less, except in an emergency situation or when operated by the U.S. Government.

Because of the airport's proximity to the Valleyfair amusement park, the park's rides are restricted in height by FAA regulations.

In 2020 the airport received a $157,000 CARES Act award.

== Facilities and aircraft ==
Flying Cloud Airport covers an area of 543 acres (220 ha) at an elevation of 906 feet (276 m) above mean sea level. It has three asphalt paved runways.

For the 12-month period ending December 31, 2022, the airport had 122,281 aircraft operations, an average of 335 per day: 96% general aviation, 3% air taxi, <1% commercial, and <1% military. At that time, there were 324 aircraft based at this airport: 259 single-engine, 34 multi-engine, 29 jet and 2 helicopter.

On April 30, 2020 an FAA Airport Improvement Program Grant of $722,222 was awarded to rehabilitate taxiways at the airport.

Viking Composite Squadron is a Civil Air Patrol squadron that has its airplane hangar at Flying Cloud Airport.

== See also ==
- List of airports in Minnesota
