= Cummings House =

Cummings House may refer to:

- Cummings House (Palatka, Florida), listed on the NRHP in Florida
- Cummings' Guest House, Old Orchard Beach, Maine, listed on the NRHP in Maine
- Holt-Cummings-Davis House, Andover, Massachusetts, listed on the NRHP in Massachusetts
- E.E. Cummings House, Cambridge, Massachusetts, listed on the NRHP in Massachusetts
- E. B. Cummings House, Southbridge, Massachusetts, listed on the NRHP in Massachusetts
- Wilson S. Cummings House, Fredericktown, Ohio, listed on the NRHP in Ohio
- Judge Will Cummings House, Chattanooga, Tennessee, listed on the NRHP in Tennessee
- Cummings House (Houston, Texas), listed on the NRHP in Texas
- Byron Cummings House, Salt Lake City, Utah, listed on the NRHP in Utah

== See also ==
- Cummins House (disambiguation)
