= Tyler Onyedim =

American football player (born 2003)

No. 98 – Denver Broncos
- Position: Defensive end
- Roster status: Active

Personal information
- Born: May 14, 2003 (age 23); Houston, Texas, U.S.
- Listed height: 6 ft 3 in (1.91 m)
- Listed weight: 292 lb (132 kg)

Career information
- High school: Foster (Richmond, Texas)
- College: Iowa State (2021–2024); Texas A&M (2025)
- NFL draft: 2026: 3rd round, 66th overall pick

Career history
- Denver Broncos (2026–present)

Career NFL statistics as of Week 9, 2026
- Tackles: 1
- Forced fumbles: 1
- Stats at Pro Football Reference

Tyler Onyedim (OWN-yeh-dihm; born May 14, 2003) is an American professional football defensive end for the Denver Broncos of the National Football League (NFL). He played college football for the Iowa State Cyclones and Texas A&M Aggies. Onyedim was selected by the Broncos in the third round of the 2026 NFL draft.

== Early life ==
Onyedim is from Richmond, Texas. He attended John and Randolph Foster High School in Texas where he competed in football as a defensive tackle and also played basketball. He won three letters for the football team and totaled 63 tackles, 21 tackles-for-loss (TFLs) and 12 sacks as a senior, earning all-district honors. A three-star recruit, Onyedim was ranked one of the top-80 defensive tackle recruits nationally and committed to play college football for the Iowa State Cyclones. The Cyclones had been among only three schools in power conferences to give an offer to him.

== College career ==
Onyedim redshirted as a true freshman at Iowa State in 2021 and tallied four tackles. The following season, he appeared in 12 games, posting 11 tackles, three TFLs, a sack and an interception. In 2023, he was named honorable mention All-Big 12 Conference after posting 42 tackles, 6.5 TFLs and two sacks. In 2024, Onyedim helped the Cyclones to the Big 12 Championship Game where they lost to the Arizona State Sun Devils. He started eight games and recorded 33 tackles, 2.5 TFLs and recovered a fumble while Iowa State also won the 2024 Pop-Tarts Bowl and finished with 11 wins, the best in school history. Across his four years at Iowa State, Onyedim appeared in 40 games and posted 90 tackles with 13 TFLs and three sacks. He transferred to the Texas A&M Aggies for his final season in 2025. Onyedim tallied 48 tackles and 2.5 sacks in his lone year with the Aggies.

== Professional career ==
Pre-draft measurables
Height	Weight	Arm length	Hand span	Wingspan	40-yard dash	10-yard split	20-yard split	20-yard shuttle	Three-cone drill	Vertical jump	Broad jump	Bench press
6 ft 3 1/2 in (1.92 m)	292 lb (132 kg)	34 1/8 in (0.87 m)	10 1/8 in (0.26 m)	6 ft 9 3/8 in (2.07 m)	5.07 s	1.69 s	2.83 s	4.65 s	7.96 s	32.0 in (0.81 m)	9 ft 3 in (2.82 m)	24 reps
All values from NFL Combine/Pro Day

Onyedim was selected by the Denver Broncos in the third round (66th overall) of the 2026 NFL draft. On June 22, 2026, Onyedim officially signed his four-year rookie contract.

== Personal life ==
Both of Onyedim's parents moved to the United States from Nigeria in the 1990s.
