= Sir Alexander Cumming, 1st Baronet =

Scottish landowner and politician

Arms of Alexander Cumming, 1st Baronet of Culter (d.1725): "Azure, three garbs within a bordure or."

Sir Alexander Cumming, 1st Baronet (c.1670–1725) of Culter, Aberdeen, was a Scottish landowner and Tory politician who sat in the House of Commons from 1709 to 1722.

Cumming was the eldest son of Alexander Cumming of Culter and his wife Helen Allardice, daughter of James Allardice of Allardice, Kincardine. He married, in about 1690, Elizabeth Swinton, daughter of Sir Alexander Swinton, Lord Mersington, known as the fanatical judge, and entered the faculty of advocates in 1691. He went to study in Holland. He was created a Baronet in the Baronetage of Nova Scotia on 28 February 1695. He qualified at Leyden on 30 December 1695, aged 25 and returned to Scotland and attracted prominent clients to his practice. He was Commissioner of Justiciary for the Highlands in 1701 and 1703 and captain of foot in the Earl of Mar's regiment from 1702 to 1704. From 1705 to 1711 he was conservator of Scottish privileges in the Low Countries. His wife Elizabeth died in 1709 and he married as his second wife Elizabeth Dennis, daughter of William Dennis of Pucklechurch, Gloucestershire on 10 September 1710

Cumming was elected Member of Parliament for Aberdeenshire at a by-election on 18 January 1709. Initially he voted with the Administration on the naturalization of the Palatines, but as an Episcopalian moved to the Tories, and voted against the impeachment of Dr Sacheverell. He was elected again at the 1710 British general election and took part in attacks on the old ministry, being included in the list of ‘worthy patriots’ who had helped to detect their mismanagement. On a Scottish matter, he voted in February 1711 against Mungo Graham over the disputed Kinross-shire election, and became a member of an informal ‘steering committee’ of Scottish episcopalian MPs. He was returned again in 1713 and 1715. He did not stand in 1722.

Cumming died on 7 February 1725, in debt as a result of the South Sea Bubble. By his first wife he had a son and two daughters, and by his second wife a son (James Cumming of Breda) and five daughters. His son Alexander by his first wife succeeded him in the baronetcy.

Parliament of Great Britain
Preceded by Lord Haddo	Member of Parliament for Aberdeenshire; 1709–1722	Succeeded by Sir Archibald Grant, Bt
Baronetage of Nova Scotia
New creation	Baronet (of Culter); 1695-1725	Succeeded by Alexander Cumming
