= USS Cummings =

USS Cummings has been the name of more than one United States Navy ship, and may refer to:

- USS Cummings (DD-44), a Cassin-class destroyer in commission from 1913 to 1934
- USS Cummings (DD-365), a Mahan-class destroyer in commission from 1935 to 1947

== See also ==
- USS Damon Cummings (DE-756), a Cannon-class destroyer escort cancelled in 1943
- USS Damon M. Cummings (DE-643), a Buckley-class destroyer escort in commission from 1944 to 1947
