= Cummings Mountain =

Mountains named Cummings Mountain or variations.

== United States ==
In the United States, according to USGS GNIS:

| Name | USGS link | State | County | Coordinates |
|---|---|---|---|---|
| Cummings Mountain | | California | Kern | 35°02′30″N 118°34′17″W |
| Cummings Mountain | | Maine | Oxford | 44°17′30″N 70°44′30″W |
| Cummings Mountain | | New Hampshire | Coos | 44°36′45″N 71°17′17″W |
