= Andrew Boyd Cummings =

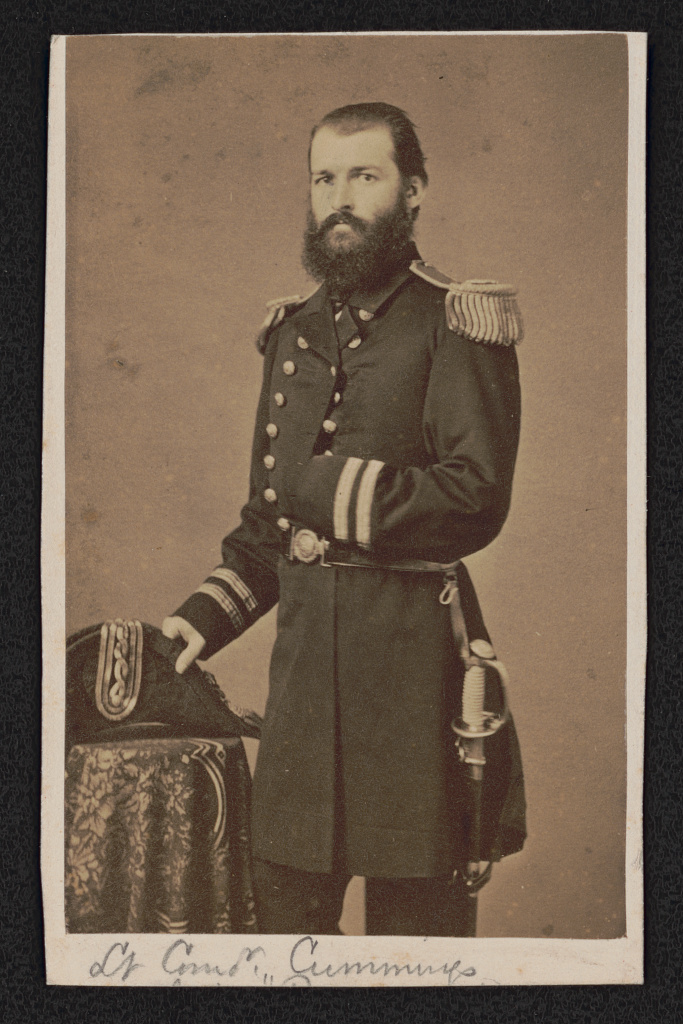
- Born: June 22, 1830; Philadelphia, Pennsylvania, US
- Died: March 18, 1863 (aged 32); New Orleans, Louisiana, US
- Burial place: Laurel Hill Cemetery, Philadelphia, Pennsylvania, US
- Military career
- Allegiance: United States of America
- Branch: U.S. Navy (Union)
- Unit: Admiral David Farragut's West Gulf Blockading Squadron
- Conflicts: American Civil War
- Awards: Two naval ships, USS Cummings named in his honor

Andrew Boyd Cummings (22 June 1830 – 18 March 1863) was an officer in the United States Navy during the American Civil War who was killed in action off the coast of Louisiana. Two naval ships, USS Cummings, have been named in his honor.

== Biography ==
Born in Philadelphia, Pennsylvania, Cummings was appointed midshipman in 1846 after graduation from Central High School of Philadelphia, but was detached from the Naval Academy the next year for active duty in Brandywine, returning to school in 1852.

During the Civil War, he served with distinction in Admiral David Farragut's West Gulf Blockading Squadron as the Executive Officer of Richmond, participating in the action at Forts Jackson and Saint Philip, Louisiana. He showed conspicuous gallantry as the squadron passed the batteries of Port Hudson, Louisiana, March 14–15, 1863, and died of wounds received in that action, in New Orleans, March 18, 1863. He was interred in his family's plot in Laurel Hill Cemetery, Philadelphia, Pennsylvania.
