= Cumings, Texas =

- Census-designated place
- Coordinates: 29°34′25″N 95°48′12″W
- Country: United States
- State: Texas
- County: Fort Bend

Area
  - Total: 2.92 sq mi (7.57 km^{2})
  - Land: 2.80 sq mi (7.24 km^{2})
  - Water: 0.12 sq mi (0.32 km^{2})
- Elevation: 85 ft (26 m)

Population (2020)
  - Total: 2,207
  - Density: 790/sq mi (305/km^{2})
- Time zone: UTC-6 (Central (CST))
  - Summer (DST): UTC-5 (CDT)
- FIPS code: 48-18134
- GNIS feature ID: 1852696

Cumings is an unincorporated community and census-designated place (CDP) in Fort Bend County, Texas, United States. The population was 2,207 at the 2020 census, significantly up from 981 at the 2010 census.

== History ==
The town was established in the early 1990s.

== Geography ==
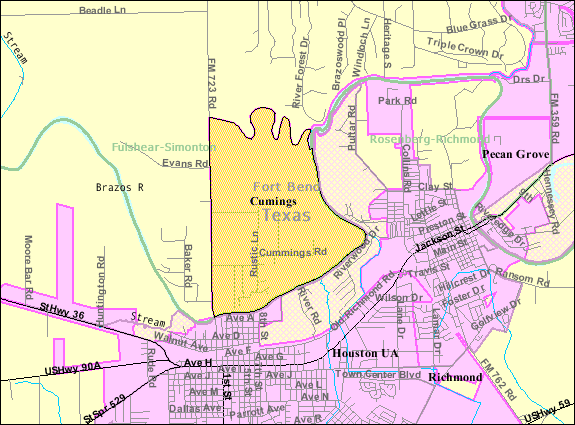
Map of Cumings

Cumings is located north of the center of Fort Bend County at 29°34′25″N 95°48′12″W (29.573483, -95.803286). It is bordered to the south and west by the city of Rosenberg. The southern and eastern edge of Cumings is the Brazos River.

According to the United States Census Bureau, the CDP has a total area of 2.9 square miles (7.6 km^{2}), of which 2.8 square miles (7.2 km^{2}) and 0.1 square miles (0.3 km^{2}), or 4.25%, is water.

== Demographics ==
Historical population
Census	Pop.	Note	%±
2000	683		—
2010	981		43.6%
2020	2,207		125.0%
U.S. Decennial Census; 1850–1900 1910; 1920 1930 1940; 1950 1960 1970; 1980 1990 2000; 2010 2020

=== 2020 census ===
Cumings CDP, Texas – Racial and ethnic composition Note: the US Census treats Hispanic/Latino as an ethnic category. This table excludes Latinos from the racial categories and assigns them to a separate category. Hispanics/Latinos may be of any race.
Race / Ethnicity (NH = Non-Hispanic)	Pop 2000	Pop 2010	Pop 2020	% 2000	% 2010	% 2020
White alone (NH)	55	225	840	8.05%	22.94%	38.06%
Black or African American alone (NH)	0	66	264	0.00%	6.73%	11.96%
Native American or Alaska Native alone (NH)	0	8	12	0.00%	0.82%	0.54%
Asian alone (NH)	1	6	58	0.15%	0.61%	2.63%
Native Hawaiian or Pacific Islander alone (NH)	0	0	2	0.00%	0.00%	0.09%
Other race alone (NH)	0	0	5	0.00%	0.00%	0.23%
Mixed race or Multiracial (NH)	1	2	62	0.15%	0.20%	2.81%
Hispanic or Latino (any race)	626	674	964	91.65%	68.71%	43.68%
Total	683	981	2,207	100.00%	100.00%	100.00%

=== 2000 census ===
As of the census of 2000, there were 683 people, 172 households, and 156 families residing in the CDP. The population density was 225.6 inhabitants per square mile (87.1/km^{2}). There were 186 housing units at an average density of 61.4 per square mile (23.7/km^{2}). The racial makeup of the CDP was 60.76% White, 0.29% Asian, 35.43% from other races, and 3.51% from two or more races. Hispanic or Latino of any race were 91.65% of the population.

There were 172 households, out of which 50.6% had children under the age of 18 living with them, 70.9% were married couples living together, 13.4% had a female householder with no husband present, and 9.3% were non-families. 8.1% of all households were made up of individuals, and 2.9% had someone living alone who was 65 years of age or older. The average household size was 3.97 and the average family size was 4.16.

In the CDP, the population was spread out, with 34.8% under the age of 18, 13.0% from 18 to 24, 29.6% from 25 to 44, 16.7% from 45 to 64, and 5.9% who were 65 years of age or older. The median age was 27 years. For every 100 females, there were 98.5 males. For every 100 females age 18 and over, there were 99.6 males.

The median income for a household in the CDP was $36,316, and the median income for a family was $36,776. Males had a median income of $25,847 versus $16,641 for females. The per capita income for the CDP was $10,399. About 24.0% of families and 20.5% of the population were below the poverty line, including 14.7% of those under age 18 and 56.8% of those age 65 or over.

== Education ==
Cumings is within the Lamar Consolidated Independent School District.

Zoned schools include:

- Jackson Elementary School
- Briscoe Junior High School
- Foster High School

The designated community college for LCISD is Wharton County Junior College.
