= USS Cummings (DD-365) =

Mahan-class destroyer

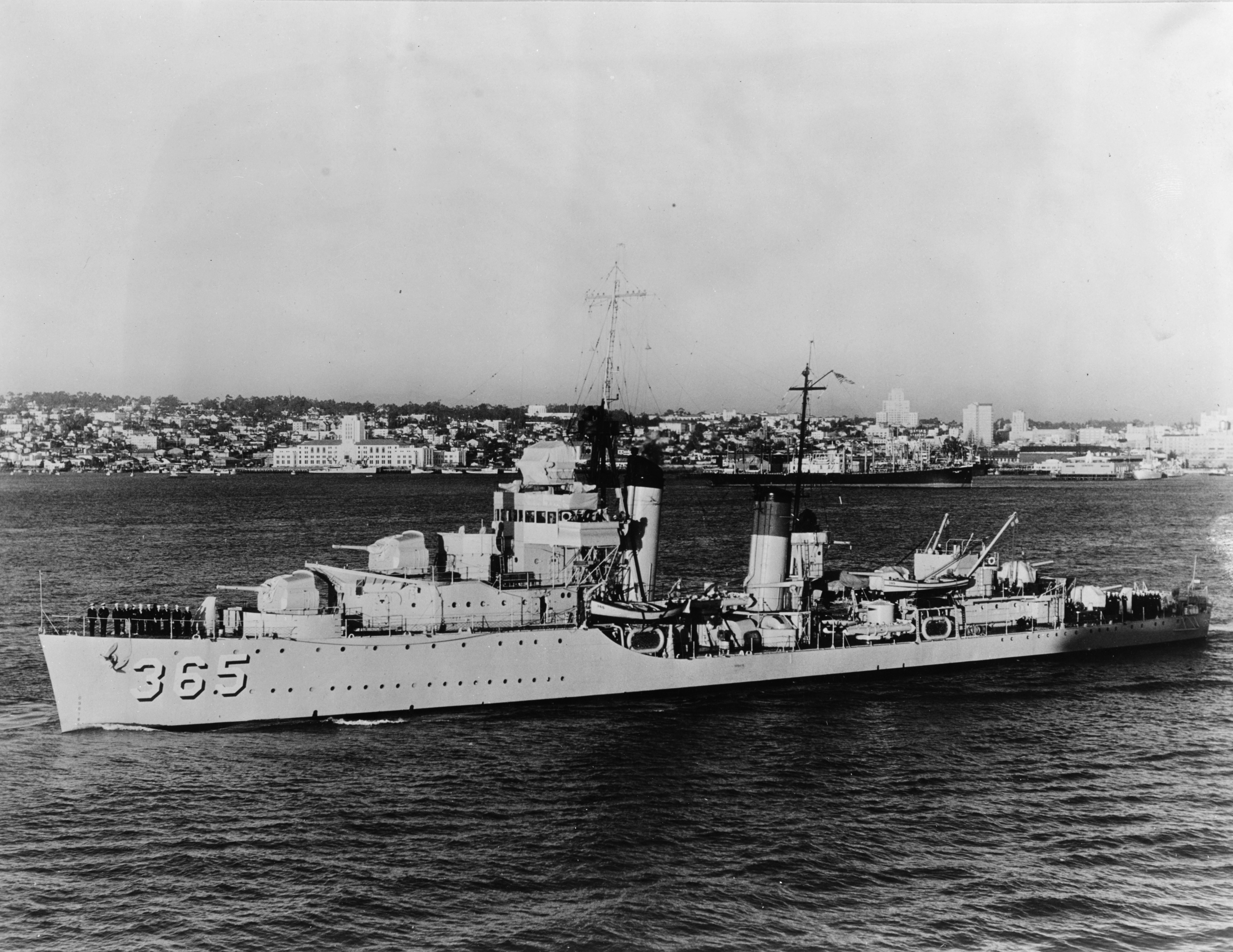
- USS Cummings (DD-365)

History

United States
- Name: Cummings
- Namesake: Andrew Boyd Cummings
- Builder: United Shipyards, Incorporated, Staten Island, New York
- Laid down: 26 June 1934
- Launched: 11 December 1935
- Commissioned: 25 November 1936
- Decommissioned: 14 December 1945
- Stricken: 28 January 1947
- Fate: Sold, 17 July 1947

General characteristics as built
- Class & type: Mahan-class destroyer
- Displacement: 1,500 tons
- Length: 341 ft 4 in (104.04 m)
- Beam: 35 ft (11 m)
- Draft: 9 ft 10 in (3.00 m)
- Propulsion: Steam turbine
- Speed: 36 knots (67 km/h; 41 mph)
- Complement: 158 officers and crew
- Armament: 1 × Gun director above bridge; 5 × single 5 in (130 mm)/38 cal. DP; 3 × quad 21 in (530 mm) torpedo tubes; 4 × single .50 cal (12.7 mm) AA machine guns; 2 × depth charge stern racks

The second USS Cummings (DD-365) was a Mahan-class destroyer in the United States Navy, named for Andrew Boyd Cummings. She was a Pacific-based vessel, performing patrol and escort duties before and during World War II. The ship was present during the Attack on Pearl Harbor by the Japanese on 7 December 1941, though she escaped major damage or casualties. Cummings was decommissioned in 1945 and sold for scrap in 1947.

== History ==
Cummings was launched 11 December 1935 at the United Shipyards, Inc., New York. The ship was sponsored by Mrs. W. W. Mills, niece of Lieutenant Commander Cummings, and commissioned 25 November 1936.

Departing New York 29 September 1937, Cummings arrived at San Diego 28 October to join the Battle Force. She participated in the fleet problem in Hawaiian waters in April 1938, and a Presidential Fleet Review at San Francisco in July. In 1939, the exercises were held in the Panama Canal Zone and the Caribbean from January to April. Returning to San Diego 12 May 1939, Cummings participated in flotilla and fleet training, and served as plane guard for the carriers Yorktown (CV-5) and Lexington (CV-2). When the security patrol was begun on the west coast in 1940, Cummings served on it, intermittently, while continuing to conduct exercises in anti-aircraft and submarine tactics and target practice.

Cummings was based in Pearl Harbor on 26 April 1940. Except for a west coast overhaul and cruises to Tutuila, Samoa, Auckland, New Zealand, and Tahiti between 4 March and 3 April 1941, she remained in Hawaiian waters conducting patrols and constantly exercising and drilling. When the Japanese attacked Pearl Harbor on 7 December 1941, Cummings weathered the bombs that fell ahead and astern, receiving only minor casualties from fragments, and sortied on patrol almost immediately. From 19 December 1941 to 4 May 1942, Cummings escorted convoys between Pearl Harbor and San Francisco. Then sailed between Suva, Fiji Islands, and Auckland, New Zealand, from 9 June to 13 August on similar duty.

After overhaul in San Francisco, Cummings escorted a convoy to Noumea and Wellington, New Zealand, in November 1942. The ship began patrol and escort missions for the Guadalcanal operation from bases at Espiritu Santo and Nouméa until 17 May 1943, and then sailed to Auckland, New Zealand, for a brief overhaul. Cummings Returned to Nouméa 4 June and screened transports to Auckland in July, and served at Efate from 5 August until 4 September.

Overhauled on the west coast again, Cummings joined TF 94 to patrol off Adak, Alaska, between 1 and 16 December, before she returned to Pearl Harbor 21 December.

=== 1944 ===
Assigned to the 5th Fleet, Cummings sortied on 19 January 1944 for operations in the Marshall Islands, accompanying carriers for air strikes on Wotje and Eniwetok until 21 February. She sailed from Majuro 4 March for Trincomalee, Ceylon, where she rendezvoused 31 March with British ships for exercises. Cummings sailed with British Force 70 to screen during air strikes on Sabang, Sumatra, on 19 April. She returned to Ceylon until 6 May and then cleared for Exmouth Gulf, Australia. With British Force 66, Cummings sortied 15 May for air strikes on Soerabaja, Java, then she left the British forces and returned to Pearl Harbor via Sydney.

Arriving at San Francisco 7 July 1944, Cummings sailed 21 July, escorting President Franklin D. Roosevelt aboard Baltimore (CA-68) to Pearl Harbor, Adak, and Juneau. The President and his staff came aboard Cummings 8 August for transportation to Seattle and upon arrival 12 August, President Roosevelt broadcast a nationwide address from the forecastle of Cummings.

Departing Seattle 13 August 1944, Cummings joined TG 12.5 at Pearl Harbor for an air strike and shore bombardment of Wake Island on 3 September. With the 3d Fleet, Cummings joined the bombardment of Marcus Island on 9 October. Then she screened the escort carriers that launched the supporting air strikes on Luzon, Cebu, Leyte, Samar, Negros, and engaged the Japanese in the decisive Battle of Leyte Gulf. Cummings took part in the bombardment of Iwo Jima on 11 and 12 November, and she then returned to Saipan 21 November for local duty.

Cummings interrupted this duty to join the repeated strikes on Iwo Jima from 8 December 1944 to 19 March 1945, supplying fire support for the invading troops. She was stationed off Iwo Jima and, occasionally, escorted convoys to Saipan and Guam until the end of the war. Cummings duties included local convoy escort and control duty, and the air-sea rescue work that accompanied the intensified strikes on Okinawa and the Japanese home islands. She supervised the occupation of Haha Jima on 9 September, then the ship sailed from Iwo Jima 19 September for San Pedro, California, Tampa, Florida, and Norfolk, Virginia. Cummings was decommissioned 14 December 1945 and sold 17 July 1947.

== Honors ==
Cummings received seven battle stars for service during World War II.
