= Cumming baronets =

Baronetcy in the Baronetage of Nova Scotia

The Cumming Baronetcy was a title in the Baronetage of Nova Scotia. It was created for Sir Alexander Cumming, 1st Baronet on 28 February 1695.

== Cumming baronets of Culter, Scotland (1695) ==
- Sir Alexander Cumming, 1st Baronet (c.1670–1725)
- Sir Alexander Cumming, 2nd Baronet (1691–1775)
- Sir Alexander Cumming, 3rd Baronet (c.1737–c.1793)
