= Alexander Cuming =

Scottish adventurer to North America

Sir Alexander Cuming, 2nd Baronet (1691–1775) was a Scottish adventurer to North America; he returned to Britain with a delegation of Cherokee chiefs. He later spent many years in a debtors' prison.

== Early life ==
Coat of Arms of Alexander Cuming

Cuming was born (according to his manuscript autobiography) in Edinburgh on 18 December 1691. He was the only son of Sir Alexander Cuming, M.P. (c.1670–1725), the first baronet of Culter, Aberdeenshire, by his first wife, Elizabeth; she was the second daughter of the second wife of Sir Alexander Swinton, a Scottish judge. (He had several sisters and a half-brother, James Cuming of Breda, by his father's second wife)

In 1714 he was called to the Scottish bar, and also held a captain's commission in the Russian army. From his manuscripts, it seems that Cuming was induced to quit the legal profession by a pension of £300 a year being granted to him by the government at Christmas 1718, and that it was discontinued at Christmas 1721 at the instance, he suggests, of Sir Robert Walpole, who bore a grudge against his father for opposing him in parliament. It is more probable that he was found to be of a too flighty disposition to fulfil the services expected of him.

== Voyage to America; the Cherokee delegation ==
In 1729 Cuming was led, supposedly by a dream of his wife's, to undertake a voyage to America, with the object of visiting the Cherokee mountains on the borders of South Carolina and Virginia. Leaving England on 13 September, he arrived at Charlestown on 5 December, and on 11 March following he began his journey to the Cherokee Indian country. It was on 3 April 1730 that "by the unanimous consent of the people he was made lawgiver, commander, leader, and chief of the Cherokee nation, and witness of the power of God, at a general meeting at Nequisee, in the Cherokee mountains". Extracts from his journal, giving an account of his transactions with the Indians and his explorations in the Cherokee mountains, were published in the London Daily Journal of 8 October 1730.

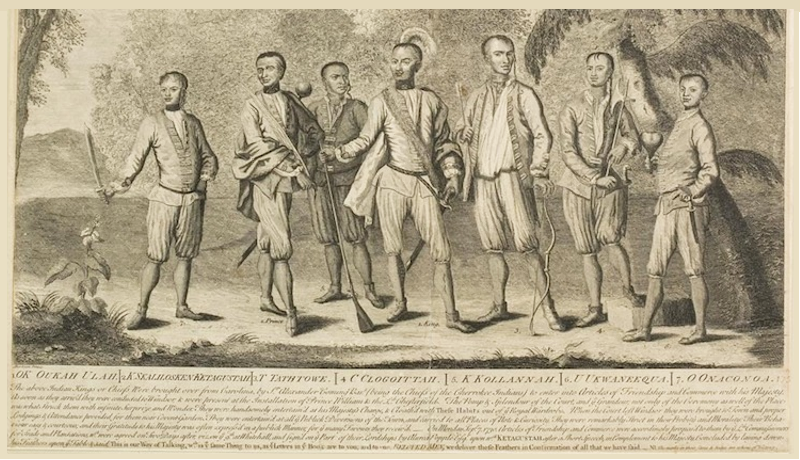
The Cherokee delegation to England. Engraving by Isaac Basire.

He returned to Charlestown on 13 April 1730, accompanied by seven chiefs of the Cherokee nation, including Attakullakulla. They sailed with him to England, and on 5 June arrived at Dover in the man-of-war Fox. On 18 June he was allowed to present the chiefs to George II in the royal chapel at Windsor. Four days later laid his crown at the feet of the king, when the chiefs laid also their four scalps to show their superiority over their enemies, and five eagle tails as emblems of victory. The proceedings of the chiefs while in England excited great interest. Shortly before they returned to their country, an "Agreement of Peace and Friendship", was signed with them on 29 September, in the name of the British nation, and with the approval of the Board of Trade: the Cherokees recognized Britain as a sole trading nation, in return for supplies of guns and gunpowder. This agreement was probably the means of keeping the Cherokees as firm allies of Britain in subsequent wars.

By this time some reports seriously affecting Cuming's character had reached England. In a letter from South Carolina, bearing the date 12 June 1730, an extract from which is given in the Edinburgh Weekly Journal for 16 September, he is directly accused of having defrauded the settlers of large sums of money and other property by means of fictitious promissory notes. He does not seem to have made any answer to these charges, which, if true, would explain his subsequent ill-success and poverty. The government turned a deaf ear to all his proposals, which included schemes for paying off eighty millions of the national debt by settling three million Jewish families in the Cherokee mountains to cultivate the land, and for relieving Britain's American colonies from taxation by establishing numerous banks and a local currency.

== Imprisonment ==
Being now deeply in debt, Cuming turned to alchemy, and attempted experiments on the transmutation of metals. In 1737 he was confined within the limits of the Fleet Prison, but having a rule of court. He remained there until 1765, when, on 30 December of that year, he was nominated a poor brother of the London Charterhouse by Archbishop Secker, and took up residence in the hospital on 3 January 1766. He died there nearly ten years afterwards, and was buried in the church of East Barnet on 28 August 1775. He had been elected a fellow of the Royal Society in 1720, but, neglecting to pay the annual fee, was expelled in 1757.

== Family ==
Cuming married Amy, daughter of Lancelot Whitehall, a member of an old Shropshire family, and a commissioner in the customs for Scotland. They had a son, Alexander, born about 1737, and a daughter, Elizabeth, who predeceased him. Amy died during Cuming's imprisonment, and was buried in East Barnet on 22 October 1743. Their son, who succeeded to the title, was a captain in the army, but became mentally ill, and died some time before 1796 in poverty, in the neighbourhood of Red Lion Street, Whitechapel.

Baronetage of Nova Scotia
Preceded by Alexander Cumming	Baronet (of Culter); 1725–1775	Succeeded by Alexander Cumming
