= Robert Stevenson Dalton Cuming =

Royal Navy Admiral (1852–1940)

Admiral Robert Stevenson Dalton Cuming, CBE, DSO (10 September 1852 – 22 February 1940) was a Royal Navy officer. Born Robert Stevenson Dalton Cuming, he changed his surname to Cuming by deed poll in 1913.

He entered the Royal Navy as a cadet in 1866, became lieutenant in 1877, commander in 1890, and captain in 1897. He was promoted to rear-admiral in 1907, retired the same year, was promoted to vice-admiral on the Retired List in 1911, and admiral on the Retired List in 1915.

During the First World War, he served in the Royal Naval Reserve. He was appointed a DSO in 1917 and CBE in 1919 for his war services.

In retirement he was active in the Royal British Legion.
