= John R. Cummins Farmhouse =

Historic house in Minnesota, United States

- U.S. National Register of Historic Places
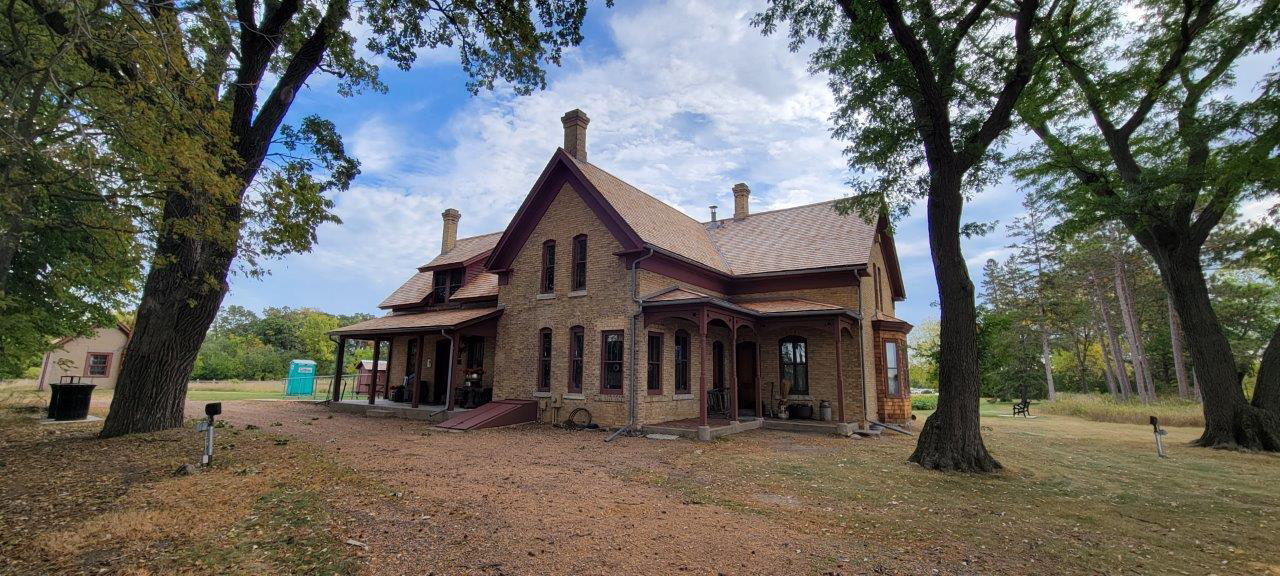
- The John R. Cummins Farmhouse from the southwest

- Location within Minnesota Location within the United States
- Location: 13600 Pioneer Trail, Eden Prairie, Minnesota
- Coordinates: 44°49′48.8″N 93°26′56.5″W
- Area: 3.45 acres (1.40 ha)
- Built: 1879, 1910
- Architect: John R. Cummins
- Architectural style: Greek Revival, Italianate
- NRHP reference No.: 82002957
- Added to NRHP: September 2, 1982

The John R. Cummins House is a historic house in Eden Prairie, Minnesota, United States, a suburb southwest of Minneapolis. The house is listed on the National Register of Historic Places.

== History ==
Cummins and his wife, Martha "Mattie" Cummins, established a farmstead on the property in 1856. They built the house in 1879-1880 and lived there until 1908. Cummins was a horticulturist who helped to establish the Minnesota Horticultural Society. During his horticultural experiments, Cummins corresponded with other horticulturalists in the area, including Peter Gideon, Jonathan Taylor Grimes, Henry Lyman, William Macintosh, E.R. Pond, and others. Cummins primarily grew wheat as a farm crop.

In 1908, Edwin and Harriet Sprague Phipps bought the farm and lived there until 1934. The Phipps family raised grain, vegetables, and flowers, and Edwin earned the title "Asparagus King of Hennepin County" for the vegetables he sold at a stand on nearby U.S. Route 212 (Flying Cloud Drive). Harriet Phipps planted a large bed of peonies in about 1920. The peony bed exists to this day. Her daughter, Mildred Grill, remarked, "The peony bed has been there for over 60 years. Mother put in 500 plants. There wasn't another bed like it in the county. She sold flowers in season." Their son-in-law and daughter, Martin and Mildred Grill, owned the house from 1934 through 1976. Martin, nicknamed "Pappy", built an airplane landing strip on the property in 1937. In 1941, the United States Navy arranged to use the landing strip for student pilots from Wold-Chamberlain Airport (now Minneapolis-St. Paul International Airport) to make practice approaches. After World War II was over, Grill sold the landing strip and some additional land to American Aviation, Inc. The field is now known as Flying Cloud Airport.

== Cummins-Phipps-Grill House Museum ==
The Grill family sold the house and surrounding farmland to the city of Eden Prairie in 1976 for parkland. The house was listed on the National Register of Historic Places in 1982. The house itself has elements of the Greek Revival style, in the wide trim on the gable end, and elements of the Italianate style with the use of brick and the segmental arches over the windows. It has a gable front with a wing on the west side, along with an L-shaped front porch. The main floor contains a parlor, a bedroom, a bathroom, the living room, and the kitchen. The second floor contains four bedrooms. In addition to the main house, there are four wooden outbuildings and a milk house on the property. The Eden Prairie Historical Society acquired stewardship of the house itself through a lease agreement in May 2010. The Society operates the house now called the "Cummins-Phipps-Grill House" and uses the house for events, tours, programming, and restoration efforts.

== Notable events ==
At 11:38am on Wednesday, August 12, 2009, an extensively modified and privately owned Beechcraft Model 18 aircraft lost power in one of its two engines shortly after takeoff from Flying Cloud and crashed on the front lawn of the farmstead, just a few feet southeast of the front door. The two occupants aboard were fatally injured in the fiery crash, which also damaged some of the original trees on the property. No one was at the farmstead at the time of the crash, and the house was not damaged, yet sections of debris landed on the front porch.

== See also ==
- List of museums in Minnesota
