= Perkins Addition =

Historic housing development in Salt Lake City, Utah, U.S.

The Perkins Addition was a 13-house development in Salt Lake City, Utah. Ten of its houses survived in 1983 and nine were each individually listed on the National Register of Historic Places.

== History ==
The Perkins Addition was a "streetcar subdivision" development of 13 brick houses, all built in 1891 by a Denver investment company, ten of which survived in 1983 and nine of which were listed on the National Register.

The nine NRHP-listed ones are each covered in a section below. The one not NRHP-listed is the Elgin S. Yankee House, at 955 E. 1700 South.

== John Vaughan ==
John Vaughan was an architect who designed many homes.

== W.S. Burhaus ==
W.S. Burhaus was a contractor who built many of them.

== Alexander Mitchell House ==
- Alexander Mitchell House
- U.S. National Register of Historic Places
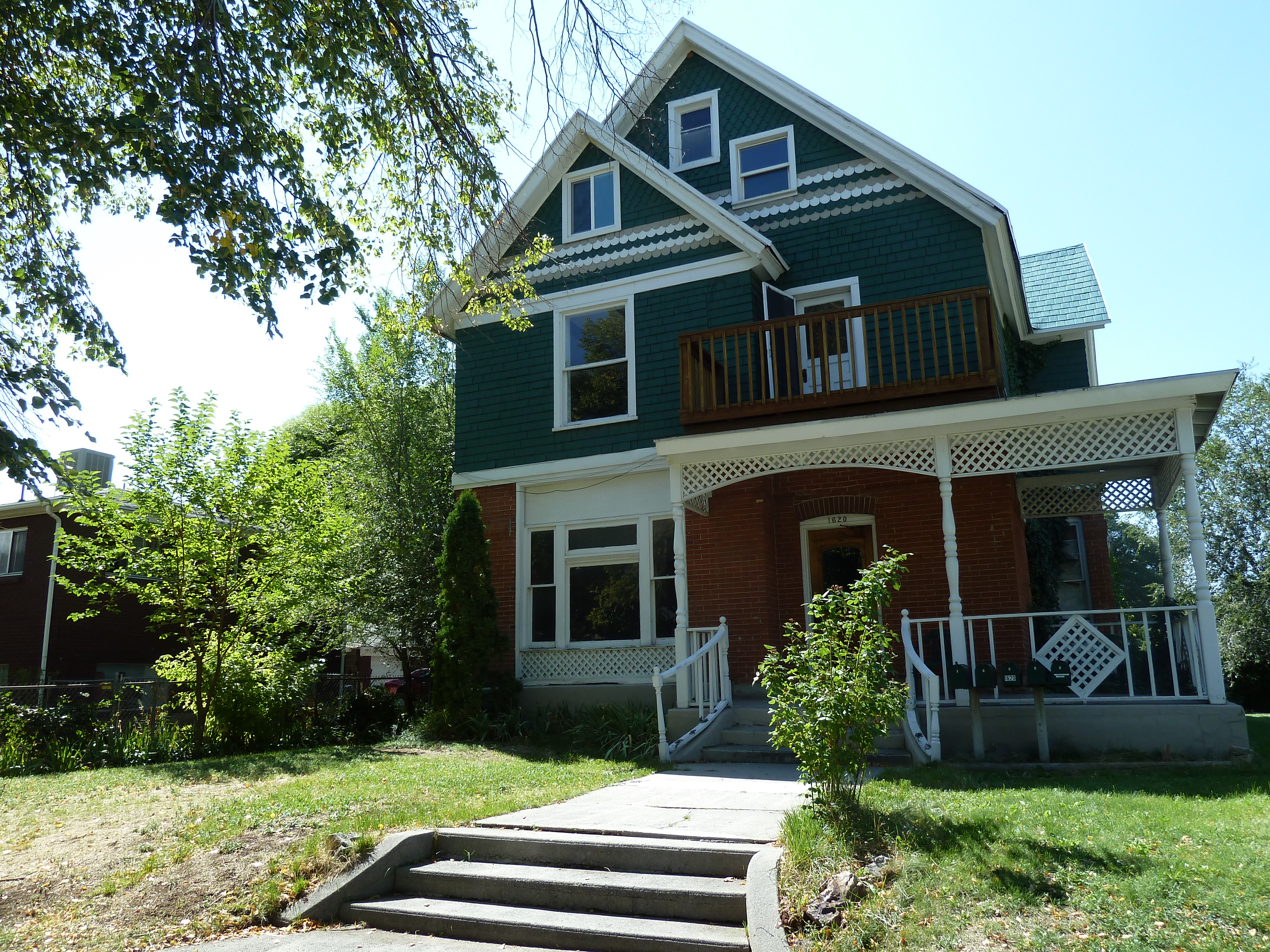

- Location within Utah Location within the United States
- Location: 1620 S. 1000 East, Salt Lake City, Utah
- Coordinates: 40°44′3″N 111°51′43″W
- Area: less than one acre
- Built: 1891
- Built by: W.S. Burhaus
- Architect: John Vaughan
- Architectural style: Late Victorian, Victorian Eclectic
- MPS: Perkins Addition Streetcar Suburb TR
- NRHP reference No.: 83003955
- Added to NRHP: October 13, 1983

The Alexander Mitchell House at 1620 S. 1000 East, in Salt Lake City, Utah, was built in 1891. It was listed on the National Register of Historic Places in 1983 for its architecture, which is Victorian Eclectic, Late Victorian, and other.

The Mitchell House is one of three buildings in the NRHP listing of Perkins Addition houses that are not built from the pattern-book design shared by seven others. It includes similar elements: a prominent gable in its front facade, and the use of fishscale shingles in gabled areas.

== Byron Cummings House ==
- Byron Cummings House
- U.S. National Register of Historic Places
- Location within Utah Location within the United States
- Location: 936 E. 1700 South, Salt Lake City, Utah
- Coordinates: 40°44′0″N 111°51′49″W
- Area: less than one acre
- Built: 1891
- Built by: W.S. Burhouse
- Architect: John Vaughan
- Architectural style: Victorian Eclectic, Late Victorian
- MPS: Perkins Addition Streetcar Suburb TR
- NRHP reference No.: 83003949
- Added to NRHP: October 13, 1983

The Byron Cummings House at 936 E. 1700 South, in Salt Lake City, Utah, was built in 1891. It was listed on the National Register of Historic Places in 1983.

It is significant in part for association with Byron Cummings, known as "the father of athletics" at University of Utah.

It is one of seven identical-plan buildings in the Perkins Addition, built from the same pattern-book design. The Perkins Addition was a "streetcar subdivision" development of 13 brick houses, all built in 1891 by a Denver investment company, ten of which survived in 1983.

== Harper J. Dininny House ==
925 E. Logan Avenue, NRHP-listed

== Charles H. Weeks House ==
935 E. Logan Avenue, NRHP-listed

== Thomas Yardley House ==
955 E. Logan Avenue, NRHP-listed

== John W. Judd House ==
918 E. Logan Avenue, NRHP-listed

== Clifford R. Pearsall House ==
950 E. Logan Avenue, NRHP-listed

== Henry Luce House ==
921 E. 1700 South, NRHP-listed

== Mabry-Van Pelt House ==
946 E. 1700 South, NRHP-listed
